= David Byrne discography =

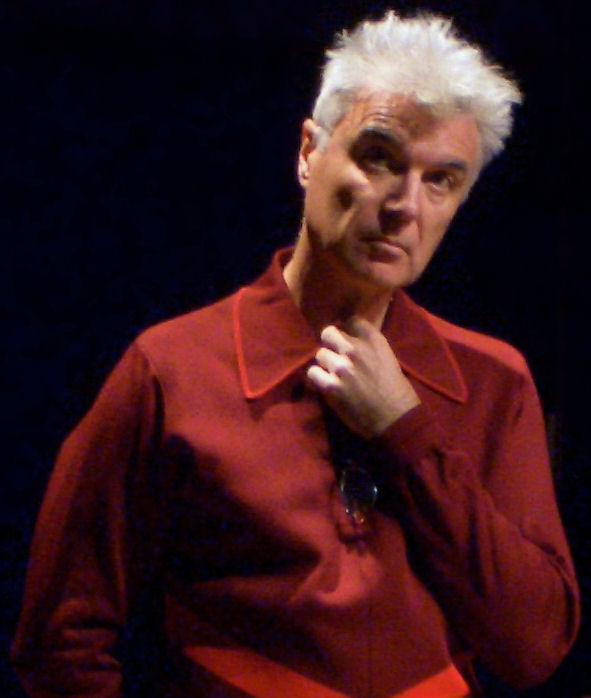
- David Byrne speaking at the 2006 Future of Music Policy Summit hosted by the McGill University Schulich School of Music in Montreal, Quebec, Canada
- Studio albums: 10
- Soundtrack albums: 12
- Live albums: 5
- Singles: 14
- Remix albums: 1

This article catalogs the ongoing discography of American musician, writer, visual artist, and filmmaker David Byrne, principal songwriter, lead vocalist, and guitarist of the rock band Talking Heads.

== Albums ==
=== Studio albums ===
Title	Album details	Peak chart positions							
Title	Album details	US	AUS	BEL (Fl.)	ITA	NLD	NZ	SWE	UK
My Life in the Bush of Ghosts (with Brian Eno)	Released: February 1981; Rereleased: March 27, 2006; Label: Sire	44	47	62	29	—	8	—	29
Rei Momo	Released: October 3, 1989; Label: Luaka Bop, Sire	71	96	—	—	88	—	28	52
Uh-Oh	Released: March 3, 1992; Label: Luaka Bop, Warner Bros.	125	67	—	—	52	39	26	26
David Byrne	Released: May 24, 1994; Label: Luaka Bop, Warner Bros.	139	—	—	—	—	—	20	43
Feelings	Released: June 17, 1997; Label: Luaka Bop, Warner Bros.	155	—	—	—	—	—	42	91
Look into the Eyeball	Released: May 8, 2001; Label: Virgin	120	—	—	15	—	—	—	58
Grown Backwards	Released: March 16, 2004; Label: Nonesuch, Warner Bros.	178	—	55	29	—	—	—	88
Everything That Happens Will Happen Today (with Brian Eno)	Released: August 18, 2008; Label: Todo Mundo	174	66	58	—	—	31	—	—
Love This Giant (with St. Vincent)	Released: September 10, 2012; Label: 4AD, Todo Mundo	23	—	51	52	83	—	—	40
American Utopia	Released: March 9, 2018; Label: Nonesuch	3	82	19	32	43	—	—	16
Who Is the Sky? (with Ghost Train Orchestra)	Released: September 5, 2025; Label: Matador	172	18	7	—	17	17	—	34
"—" denotes a recording that did not chart or was not released in that territory.

=== Soundtracks and music for theater ===
Title	Album details	Peak chart positions					
Title	Album details	US	BEL (Fl.)	NLD	NZ	SWE	UK
The Catherine Wheel	Released: December 1981; Label: Sire	104	—	—	32	40	—
Music for "The Knee Plays"	Released: May 1985; Label: ECM	141	—	—	—	—	—
Sounds from True Stories	Released: 1986; Label: Sire	—	—	—	—	—	—
The Last Emperor (with Ryuichi Sakamoto and Cong Su)	Released: 1987; Label: Virgin	152	—	—	—	—	—
The Forest	Released: June, 1991; Luaka Bop	—	—	—	—	—	—
Your Action World (Note: Music for Byrne's art presentation of the same name.)	Released: January 1, 1999; Self-released	—	—	—	—	—	—
In Spite of Wishing and Wanting	Released: 1999; Self-released	—	—	—	—	—	—
E.E.E.I. (Envisioning Emotional Epistemological Information) (Note: Music for Byrne's speaking tour and PowerPoint presentation of the same name.)	Released: July 2, 2003; Self-released	—	—	—	—	—	—
Lead Us Not into Temptation	Released: September 30, 2003; Label: Thrill Jockey	—	—	—	—	—	—
Big Love: Hymnal	Released: August 19, 2008; Label: Todo Mundo, HBO, Play Tone	—	—	—	—	—	—
Here Lies Love (with Fatboy Slim)	Released: April 6, 2010; Label: Todomundo, Nonesuch	96	96	83	—	—	76
American Utopia on Broadway Original Cast Recording	Released: October 25, 2019; Label: Nonesuch	—	—	—	—	—	—
"—" denotes a recording that did not chart or was not released in that territory.

In addition to the scores and soundtracks that Byrne recorded have been released as albums, Byrne has written music for several other productions:

- Dead End Kids: A Story of Nuclear Power by Joanne Akalaitis
- Main title theme for Alive from Off Center season 1 (1984)
- Something Wild by Jonathan Demme: "Loco de Amor" song co-written with Johnny Pacheco; sung with Celia Cruz backed by Ray Barretto's band (1986)
- Married to the Mob by Jonathan Demme (1988)
- A Young Man's Dream and a Woman's Secret by Philip Haas (1990)
- The Giant Woman and the Lightning Man by Philip Haas (1990)

=== Live albums ===
Title	Album details	Peak chart positions	
Title	Album details	US World	PRT
Between the Teeth	Released: 1993; Format: VHS	—	—
David Byrne Live at Union Chapel	Released: October 26, 2004; Label: Nonesuch; Format: DVD	—	—
Live from Austin, Texas	Released: October 2, 2007; Label: New West; Format: CD, DVD	—	—
Everything That Happens Will Happen on This Tour – David Byrne on Tour: Songs of David Byrne and Brian Eno	Released: May 11, 2009; Label: Todo Mundo; Format: CD, digital download	—	—
Live at Carnegie Hall (with Caetano Veloso)	Released: March 12, 2012; Label: Nonesuch	8	28
"...The Best Live Show of All Time" —NME	Released: December 11, 2018; Label: Nonesuch, Todo Mundo	—	—
"—" denotes a recording that did not chart or was not released in that territory.

=== Remix albums ===
Title	Album details
The Visible Man	Released: 1998; Label: Luaka Bop

== Singles ==
List of singles as lead artist, with selected chart positions and certifications, showing year released and album name
Title	Year	Peak chart positions				Album
Title	Year	MEX	US Alt.	US AAA	US Rock and Airplay	Album
"Regiment" b/w "America Is Waiting" (with Brian Eno)	1981	—	—	—	—	My Life In the Bush of Ghosts
"Regiment" b/w "America Is Waiting" (with Brian Eno)	1981	—	—	—	—	My Life In the Bush of Ghosts
"The Jezebel Spirit" (with Brian Eno)	1981	—	—	—	—	My Life In the Bush of Ghosts
"Big Blue Plymouth (Eyes Wide Open)"	1981	—	—	—	—	My Life In the Bush of Ghosts
"The Last Emperor" (with Ryuichi Sakamoto)	1987	—	—	—	—	The Last Emperor
"Loco De Amor" (feat. Celia Cruz)	1987	—	—	—	—	Rei Momo
"Make Believe Mambo" (feat. Kirsty MacColl and Willie Colón)	1989	—	11	—	—	Rei Momo
"Dirty Old Town"	1989	—	8	—	—	Rei Momo
"Independence Day" (feat. Kirsty MacColl)	1990	—	—	—	—	Rei Momo
"The Forestry"	1991	—	—	—	—	The Forest
"Hanging Upside Down"	1992	—	—	—	—	Uh-Oh
"She's Mad"	1992	—	3	—	—	Uh-Oh
"Girls on My Mind"	1992	—	—	—	—	Uh-Oh
"Angels"	1994	—	24	—	—	David Byrne
"Back in the Box"	1994	—	—	—	—	David Byrne
"Sad Song"	1994	—	—	—	—	David Byrne
"Lillies of the Valley"	1994	—	—	—	—	David Byrne
"Dance on Vaseline"	1997	—	—	—	—	Feelings
"Miss America"	1997	—	—	—	—	Feelings
"Like Humans Do"	2001	—	—	18	—	Look Into the Eyeball
"U.B. Jesus"	2001	—	—	—	—	Look Into the Eyeball
"Desconocido Soy"	2001	—	—	—	—	Look Into the Eyeball
"Strange Overtones" (with Brian Eno)	2008	36	—	14	—	Everything That Happens Will Happen Today
"One Fine Day"	2009	—	—	—	—	Everything That Happens Will Happen Today
"Who" (with St. Vincent)	2012	—	—	—	—	Love This Giant
"I Should Watch TV"	2012	39	—	—	—	Love This Giant
"Everybody's Coming to My House"	2018	41	—	5	49	American Utopia
"This Is That"	2018	—	—	—	—	American Utopia
"David Byrne Does Hard Times"	2024	—	—	—	—	Non-album single
"Everybody Laughs" (with Ghost Train Orchestra)	2025	—	—	2	32	Who Is the Sky
"She Explains Things To Me" (with Ghost Train Orchestra)	2025	—	—	—	—	Who Is the Sky
"The Avant Garde" (with Ghost Train Orchestra)	2025	—	—	—	—	Who Is the Sky
"What Is the Reason For It?" (with Ghost Train Orchestra) (feat. Hayley Williams)	2025	—	—	26	—	Who Is the Sky
"T Shirt"	2025	—	—	—	—	Non-album single
"drivers license" (Olivia Rodrigo cover)	2026	—	—	—	—	Non-album single

=== Compilation appearances ===
Year	Release	Track(s)
1989	Like a Girl I Want You to Keep Coming	"Song for the Trees (or) I Know Sometimes the World Is Wrong"
1990	Red Hot + Blue	"Don't Fence Me In"
1993	Caged/Uncaged: A Rock/Experimental Homage to John Cage	"Cage and the Long Island Expressway" and "Enlightened Whistler"
1994	Beat the Retreat: Songs by Richard Thompson	"Just the Motion", originally by Richard Thompson
1995	Afro-Peruvian Classics: The Soul of Black Peru	"Maria Lando"
1996	Red Hot + Rio	"Waters of March" with Marisa Monte
1996	Offbeat: A Red Hot Soundtrip	"It Goes Back"
1997	Red Hot + Latin	"Yolonda Niguas" with Café Tacuba
1998	Red Hot + Lisbon	"Dreamworld: Marco de Canavezes" with Caetano Veloso
2000	Mantra Mix	"Ain't Got So Far to Go"
2002	The Only Blip Hop Record You Will Ever Need, Vol. 1	"Pocket Monster"
2004	The Wired CD	"My Fair Lady"
2007	Plum	"Ex-Guru", originally by The Fiery Furnaces
2007	The Simpsons: Testify	"Everybody Hates Ned Flanders" medley
2009	Dark Was the Night	"Knotty Pine", with Dirty Projectors
2022	Ocean Child: Songs of Yoko Ono	"Who Has Seen the Wind?"

== Session work ==
=== As musician ===
Year	Artist	Release	Notes
1978	Dinosaur	"Kiss Me Again" single	Guitar
1980	Love of Life Orchestra	"Extended Nicities" single	Guitar
1980	Robert Fripp	God Save the Queen/Under Heavy Manners	Vocals on "Under Heavy Manners"; credited as Absalam el Habib
1984	The Staple Singers	"Slippery People" single	Guitar, Talking Heads cover version
1986	Philip Glass	Song from Liquid Days	Lyrics on "Liquid Days" and "Open the Kingdom"
1988	Tom Tom Club	Boom Boom Chi Boom Boom	Vocals on "Femme Fatale"
1988	Tom Tom Club	"Femme Fatale" (Marshall Jefferson remix)	Vocals
1990	Margareth Menezes	Elegibô	Vocals and production on "Canto pra Subir" and "Abra a Boca"
1990	Bernie Worrell	Funk of Ages	Co-writing and vocals on "Sing"
1992	Richard Thompson	An Acoustic Evening	Recorded live at St. Ann & The Holy Trinity, Brooklyn Heights, March 24, 1992. (Red Phantom: RPCD 1100)
1992	Balanescu Quartet	Byrne/Moran/Lurie/Torke	Composition on "High Life for Strings"
1992	Tom Zé	Brazil Classics, Vol. 5: The Hips of Tradition	Vocals and guitar on "Jingle do Disco", released on Luaka Bop
1994	Ryuichi Sakamoto	Sweet Revenge	Lyrics on "Psychedelic Afternoon"
1995	Selena	Dreaming of You	Vocals, co-writing, and production on "God's Child (Baila Conmigo)"
1996	Café Tacuba	Avalanche de Exitos	Vocals on "No Controles"
1996	John Cale	Walking on Locusts	Guitar on "Crazy Egypt"
2000	Peret and Carol C	Tributo a Peret	Vocals on "Si Fulano"
2001	Vinicius Cantuária	Vinicius	Lyrics and vocals on "Rio"
2002	X-Press 2	Muzikizum	Co-writing and vocals on "Lazy", later rearranged and released on Grown Backwards
2004	10,000 Maniacs	Campfire Songs: The Popular, Obscure and Unknown Recordings	Vocals "Let the Mystery Be", originally recorded for 1993's MTV Unplugged, along with cover versions of "Dallas" and "Jolene"
2004	Thievery Corporation	The Cosmic Game	Lyrics and vocals on "The Heart's a Lonely Hunter"
2005	Fischerspooner	Odyssey	Lyrics on "Get Confused"
2006	Forro in the Dark	Bonfires of São João	Vocals on "Asa Branca" and "I Wish (Bundle of Contradictions)"
2006	La Portuaria	La Portuaria	Lyrics and vocals on "Hoy no le temo a la muerte"
2007	Baby Elephant	Turn My Teeth Up!	Vocals on "How Does the Brainwave?"
2007	Marisa Monte	Universo Ao Meu Redor	Vocals on "State of Liberty"
2007	David Shrigley	Worried Noodles	Vocals on "For You"
2007	Paul Van Dyk	In Between	Vocals on "Fall with Me"
2008	The BPA and Dizzee Rascal	I Think We're Gonna Need a Bigger Boat	Vocals on "Toe Jam"
2009	N.A.S.A.	The Spirit of Apollo	Vocals on "The People Tree" and "Money"
2009	Brazilian Girls	"I'm Losing Myself"	Vocals
2010	If By Yes	"Salt on Sea Glass"	Vocals on "Eliza"
2010	Maximum Balloon	Maximum Balloon	Vocals on "Apartment Wrestling"
2011	Arcade Fire	The Suburbs (Deluxe Edition)	Vocals on "Speaking in Tongues"
2013	Jun Miyake	Lost Memory Theatre - act-1	Vocals on "A Dream Is a Wish Your Heart Makes"
2013	Ryuichi Sakamoto	"Psychedelic Afternoon"	Re-recording of a 1994 collaboration; new lyrics and vocals
2014	Anna Calvi	Strange Weather	Vocals on "I'm the Man, That Will Find You (Connan Mockasin)" and "Strange Weather (Keren Ann)"
2016	De La Soul	And the Anonymous Nobody...	Co-writing and vocals on "Snoopies"
2022	Montaigne	"Always Be You" single	Vocals
2022	Montaigne	"Gravity" single	Vocals
2022	Son Lux	Everything Everywhere All At Once soundtrack	Co-writing and vocals on "This Is a Life"

=== As producer ===
Year	Artist	Release	Notes
1982	The B-52's	Mesopotamia	Also played fretless bass, synthesizer, guitar, percussion
1983	Fun Boy Three	Waiting	Also played guitar
1986	Various artists	Something Wild	Co-produced, also co-write and sang on "Loco de Amor"
1990	Margareth Menezes	Elegibô	"Canto pra Subir" and "Abra a Boca" also performs vocals
1995	Selena	Dreaming of You	"God's Child (Baila Conmigo)" also performs vocals and co-wrote

== Compositions ==
- The Forest (1991) – orchestral music for the 1988 Robert Wilson theatre piece of the same name, released as an album.
- "We're Not Like Ev'ryone Else", "Lullaby" (performed by Natalie Portman), "The Problem Is You", and "Open the Door" (with Hayley Williams) for the soundtrack of the 2025 film The Twits.

== Other projects ==
Byrne has released a handful of books, including Arboretum, a collection of sketches of some of his favorite trees, and The New Sins, a work about sin in the 21st century. He has also made several public art installations, speaking engagements on art and technology, and PowerPoint presentations. In addition to a recording career as a solo artist, he also founded the record Label Luaka Bop and Todo Mundo.
