= Live from Austin, TX (David Byrne album) =

Live from Austin, Texas

Live album by David Byrne
- Released: October 2, 2007
- Recorded: November 28, 2001
- Genre: Alternative rock
- Label: New West
- Producer: Cameron Strang; Gary Briggs; Jay Woods

David Byrne chronology
David Byrne Live at Union Chapel (2004)	Live from Austin, Texas (2007)	The Knee Plays (2007)

Professional ratings
Review scores
Source	Rating
AllMusic	link
Pitchfork Media	link

Live from Austin, Texas is a live album released by American rock musician David Byrne, released on New West Records on October 2, 2007 on CD and DVD. The songs were recorded during Byrne's 2001 tour in support of Look into the Eyeball at a date for the KLRU television show Austin City Limits. Except for the first 4 songs the quartet was accompanied by the Austin-based tango string sextet Tosca.

The album not only includes songs from his solo work, but also several Talking Heads songs and a Whitney Houston cover, "I Wanna Dance with Somebody (Who Loves Me)."

== Track listing ==
All tracks written by David Byrne except as indicated.

1. "(Nothing But) Flowers" (David Byrne, Chris Frantz, Jerry Harrison, Tina Weymouth) – 4:50
2. "God's Child (Come Dance with Me)" – 4:35
3. "And She Was" (Byrne, Frantz, Harrison, Weymouth) – 3:39
4. "Once in a Lifetime" (Byrne, Brian Eno, Frantz, Harrison, Weymouth) – 7:14
5. "The Great Intoxication" – 4:10
6. "Marching Through the Wilderness" (Byrne, John Pacheco) – 4:19
7. "The Revolution" – 2:24
8. "This Must Be the Place (Naive Melody)" – 5:50
9. "What a Day That Was" – 6:51
10. "Desconocido soy" – 2:56
11. "Like Humans Do" – 4:15
12. "Life During Wartime" (Byrne, Frantz, Harrison, Weymouth) – 6:30
13. "I Wanna Dance with Somebody (Who Loves Me)" (George Merrill, Shannon Rubicam) – 5:07

== Personnel ==
- David Byrne – Vocals and guitar
- Paul Frazier – bass guitar and vocals
- Mauro Refosco – percussion, percussion programming, and mallets
- David Hilliard – drums
- String sextet Tosca (tracks 5–13)
  - Leigh Mahoney – violin
  - Lara Hicks – violin
  - Jamie Desautels – violin
  - Stephanie Ames Asbell – viola and vocals
  - Ben Westney – cello
  - Sara Nelson – cello

== Release history ==
Region	Date	Label	Format	Catalog
Worldwide	October 2, 2007	New West	CD	6125
Worldwide	October 2, 2007	New West	DVD	8045
