= The Catherine Wheel (album) =

Soundtrack album by David Byrne
- Released: November 23, 1981
- Studio: Celestial Sound (New York); Olympic (London)
- Genre: Art rock; worldbeat; funk
- Length: 40:45 (LP); 68:41 (cassette, CD)
- Label: Sire
- Producer: David Byrne

David Byrne chronology
My Life in the Bush of Ghosts (1981)	The Catherine Wheel (1981)	Music for "The Knee Plays" (1985)

Singles from The Catherine Wheel
- 1. "Big Blue Plymouth (Eyes Wide Open) / Leg Bells" Released: 1981 (UK and Netherlands); 2. "Big Business / My Big Hands / Big Blue Plymouth" Released: 1981 (US and Canada); 3. "His Wife Refused / My Big Hands" Released: 1982 (Italy)

Professional ratings
Review scores
Source	Rating
AllMusic	4.5/5 stars
Robert Christgau	A−

The Catherine Wheel is an album by American musician David Byrne, released on November 23, 1981, by Sire Records. It contains Byrne's musical score for choreographer Twyla Tharp's dance project of the same name. The Catherine Wheel premiered September 22, 1981, at the Winter Garden Theatre in New York City.

The tracks "Big Blue Plymouth", "My Big Hands", "Big Business", and "What a Day That Was" were performed live by Talking Heads in 1983. The latter two tracks appear in their film Stop Making Sense (1984) — "What a Day That Was" appears on the original version of the soundtrack; "Big Business" was later included in the 2023 expanded edition.

Byrne has also performed several of these tracks in his solo tours, including "What a Day That Was", which appeared on his DVDs Live at Union Chapel (2004) and Live from Austin, TX (2007).

The complete score was reissued on double vinyl for Record Store Day 2023.

== Track listing ==
All songs written by David Byrne, except where noted.

=== LP ===
Side one

1. "His Wife Refused" – 4:26
2. "Two Soldiers" (Music: Byrne, Brian Eno) – 4:45
3. "The Red House" – 3:17
4. "My Big Hands (Fall Through the Cracks)" – 2:45
5. "Big Business" (Lyrics: Byrne; Music: Byrne, John Chernoff) – 5:16

Side two

1. "Eggs in a Briar Patch" – 3:31
2. "Poison" – 2:38
3. "Cloud Chamber" – 2:42
4. "What a Day That Was" – 5:32
5. "Big Blue Plymouth (Eyes Wide Open)" – 4:45
6. "Light Bath" – 1:08

=== Cassette/CD ===
1. "Light Bath" – 1:09
2. "His Wife Refused" – 4:31
3. "Ade" (Music: Byrne, Eno) – 3:22
4. "Walking" (Music: Byrne, Chernoff) – 0:52
5. "Two Soldiers" (Music: Byrne, Eno) – 3:31
6. "Under the Mountain" – 0:53
7. "Dinosaur" – 2:36
8. "The Red House" – 3:17
9. "Wheezing" – 3:12
10. "Eggs in a Briar Patch" – 3:31
11. "Poison" – 2:31
12. "Cloud Chamber" – 2:50
13. "Black Flag" – 2:29
14. "My Big Hands (Fall Through the Cracks)" – 2:46
15. "Combat" (Music: Byrne, Chernoff) – 2:45
16. "Leg Bells" (Lyrics: Byrne; Music: Byrne, Chernoff) – 2:40
17. "The Blue Flame" – 3:25
18. "Big Business" (Lyrics: Byrne; Music: Byrne, Chernoff) – 5:06
19. "Dense Beasts" – 3:11
20. "Five Golden Sections" – 2:53
21. "What a Day That Was" – 5:30
22. "Big Blue Plymouth (Eyes Wide Open)" – 4:43
23. "Light Bath" – 1:10

== Personnel ==
Musicians

- John Chernoff – percussion (tracks 1, 4, 7, 22), gung gong (tracks 2, 10, 20), congas (tracks 3, 5), piano (track 15), galloping guitar (track 18)
- David Byrne – triggered flutes (tracks 1, 23), vocals (tracks 2, 11, 14, 16–17, 21), bass guitar (tracks 2, 4–5, 8–9, 11, 13–15, 17–20), guitars (track 2–5, 7–11, 13–15, 19–21), Oberheim OB-X (track 5), Primetime (track 5), deep synthesizer (track 6), clarinet (track 7), piano (tracks 7, 16, 19), Prophet (track 7–9, 14–15), horses (track 10), mini synthesizer (track 11), Prophet strings (track 11), kitchen metals (track 12), triggered calliope (tracks 13, 20), vibes (tracks 13, 20), percussion (tracks 14, 17, 19), floating guitars (track 16), fierce and high guitars (track 17), beasts (track 19), Prophet bells (track 18), second organ (track 19), synthesizer (track 21)
- Yogi Horton – drums (tracks 2, 5–6, 9–10, 14–15, 18–19, 21), concert toms (track 22)
- Bernie Worrell – Mini Moog (track 2), piano (tracks 2, 15), clavinet (track 18)
- Adrian Belew – steel drum guitar (track 2), guitars (track 5), beasts (track 6), end guitars (track 9), floating guitars (track 10)
- Brian Eno – bass guitar (tracks 3, 5, 10), guitar (track 3), piano (track 5), vibes (track 10), Prophet scream (track 17)
- Jerry Harrison – clavinet (track 10), large drum (track 12), first organ (track 19)
- Dolette McDonald – vocals (track 11)
- Twyla Tharp – water pot (track 12)
- Richard Horowitz – nez (track 17)
- Douglas Gray – double belled euphonium (track 20)
- John Cooksey – drums (track 21)
- Steve Scales – congas (track 21)
- Sue Halloran – vocals (track 22)

Technical

- David Byrne – producer, cover photo
- Julie Last – engineer
- Cheryl Smith – assistant engineer
- Doug Bennett – engineer
- Bill Gill – assistant engineer
- Butch Jones – mixing
- Greg Calbi – mastering
- Jim Feldman – design

== Charts ==
Year	Chart	Position
1982	Billboard 200	104

== Release history ==
Region	Date	Label	Format	Catalog
Worldwide	1981	Warner Bros.	LP	3645
Worldwide	1981	Sire	Cassette tape	M5S-3645
Worldwide	1987	Luaka Bop	CD	3645
Worldwide	1990	Warner Bros.	Cassette tape	3645
Worldwide	1990	Warner Bros.	CD	3645
