= Bicycle Diaries =

2009 book by David Byrne

- Author: David Byrne
- Publication date: 2009
- Media type: Book
- Preceded by: Arboretum
- Followed by: How Music Works

Bicycle Diaries is a 2009 book written by American musician David Byrne. Byrne is known for his activism in support of increased cycling and for having used a bike as his main means of transport throughout his life, especially cycling around New York. The book describes Byrne's life and travels through the view of his cycling in cities such as New York, Berlin, Istanbul, Buenos Aires, Manila, Sydney and London.

== Critical reception ==
One reviewer for The Guardian described the book as "This is an engaging book: part diary, part manifesto."
