= Steve Jordan (accordionist) =

Esteban Jordan
- Born: February 23, 1939; Elsa, Texas, U.S.
- Died: August 13, 2010 (aged 71) Texas, U.S.
- Genres: Conjunto; Tejano; jazz; rock; blues
- Instrument: Accordion

Esteban "Steve" Jordan (February 23, 1939 – August 13, 2010) was a jazz, rock, blues, conjunto and Tejano musician from the United States. He was also known as "El Parche", "The Jimi Hendrix of the accordion", and "the accordion wizard". An accomplished musician, he played 35 different instruments.

== Life ==
Born in Elsa, Texas to migrant farm workers and partially blinded as an infant, Jordan was unable to work in the fields. Left at home, he found friendship and guidance among the elderly. At a very young age he was introduced to music, especially the accordion. At the time, the musician Valerio Longoria followed the community of migrant farm workers and played for them in the labor camps. These circumstances brought the two together and the young Esteban mastered the instrument quickly. While he remained close to his traditional conjunto roots, he never limited himself musically. More than any other accordionist, Jordan pushed the diatonic accordion to its limits, both musically and physically, playing traditional conjunto, rock, jazz, salsa, zydeco and more.

Jordan kept abreast of technological developments, using devices such as phase shifters, fuzzboxes, Echoplexes, for which he named a song, "La Polka Plex", and synthesizers, and was one of the few conjunto musicians to weave styles such as fusion jazz and rock into his music. He had also recorded country, western and mambo numbers. Members of his family frequently backed him up, including his sons Esteban Jr., Esteban III, and Ricardo. Esteban III (guitar) and Ricardo (bass) accompanied Esteban on-stage and in studio recording. Esteban established his own record label "Jordan Records, Inc." on his birthday Feb. 23, 2010. He released one of his nine albums named Carta Espiritual (a spiritual letter), on which he had spent over 15 years recording new music, still yet to be released on his recording label. His sons Esteban Jr., Esteban III, and Ricardo continue his musical legacy. His sons go by "El Rio Jordan de Esteban Jordan" Rio Jordan, the band name given by their father.

In 1988 while performing The Berlin Jazz Festival '88, Hohner invited Steve to the Hohner factory in Trossingen, Germany. The Hohner company and Steve collaborated in making a new accordion with Steve's specifications that included his own tuning, octaves, and tuning arrangement changes to the accidentals. It would enable Steve to do the music patterns he is famous for. In 2009, Hohner USA in recognition of Steve's contribution and accomplishments to the music world, Hohner launched the Steve Jordan "Rockordeon", a signature series accordion reissued in his honor.

Jordan played with guitar legend Carlos Santana a number of times.

New wave polka bands such as Brave Combo have cited Jordan's influence. In 1987 he was nominated for a Grammy, but lost out to his old friend Flaco Jiménez. His bid for mainstream presence continued in 1986 when he was asked to do the soundtrack for the Cheech Marin film Born in East L.A.

He appeared in the film Texas Conjunto: Música de la gente, a documentary about Texas conjunto music, and in True Stories, an American musical film directed by and starring musician David Byrne. He did the music and appeared as an accordion street player in the film Born in East L.A. starring Cheech Marin.

Esteban was inducted to the South Texas Conjunto Music Hall Of Fame on May 27, 2001. Also the National Hispanic Music Hall Of Fame in 2003.

Esteban had cancer for four years and died of complications from liver cancer on August 13, 2010. He was 71.

== Discography ==
| Album | Label | Notes | Year |
|---|---|---|---|
| Las Coronelas | RyN Discart | | 1971 |
| La Camelia | Freddie Records | LP 1038 | 1975 |
| Steve Jordan | Freddie Records | FR-1058 | 1976 |
| That's My Boy! | Omega Records | | 1977 |
| Que Te Parece | Freddie Records | LP-1063 | 1977 |
| Esteban Jordan Y Pura Jalea - Canto Al Pueblo | El Parche Records | | 1978 |
| Soy De Tejas | Hacienda Records | LP-7905 | 1979 |
| Ahorita | Hacienda Records | LP 7901 | 1979 |
| Con Una Sonrisa | Hacienda Records | LP-7917 | 1980 |
| Mirada Que Facina | Freddie Records | LP-1291 | 1984 |
| My Toot Toot | RCA International | IL6-7412 | 1985 |
| Turn Me Loose | RCA International | IL6-7498 | 1986 |
| El Huracan | Rounder Records | | 1989 |
| El Temblor de San Francisco | Hacienda Records | LP-7225 | 1990 |
| Porque Sera | Hacienda Records | HAC-7516 | 2000 |
