= Life During Wartime (song) =

1979 song by Talking Heads

- UK vinyl single

Single by Talking Heads

from the album Fear of Music and The Name of This Band Is Talking Heads
- B-side: "Electric Guitar" (1979)
- Released: October 14, 1979; 1984 (live)
- Genre: New wave; post-punk; funk; dance-punk
- Length: 3:41; 5:52 (live)
- Label: Sire
- Songwriters: David Byrne; Chris Frantz; Jerry Harrison; Tina Weymouth (Note: The original LP issue credited the song solely to Byrne, after complaints from other band members, Frantz, Harrison, and Weymouth were credited on later CD issues.)
- Producers: Brian Eno; Talking Heads; Gary Goetzman (live)

Talking Heads singles chronology
| "Take Me to the River" (1978) | "Life During Wartime" (1979) | "I Zimbra" (1980) |
| "Houses in Motion" (alternate mix) (1981) | "Life During Wartime" (live) (1982) | "Burning Down the House" (1983) |

Official audio
- "Life During Wartime" on YouTube

Alternative release
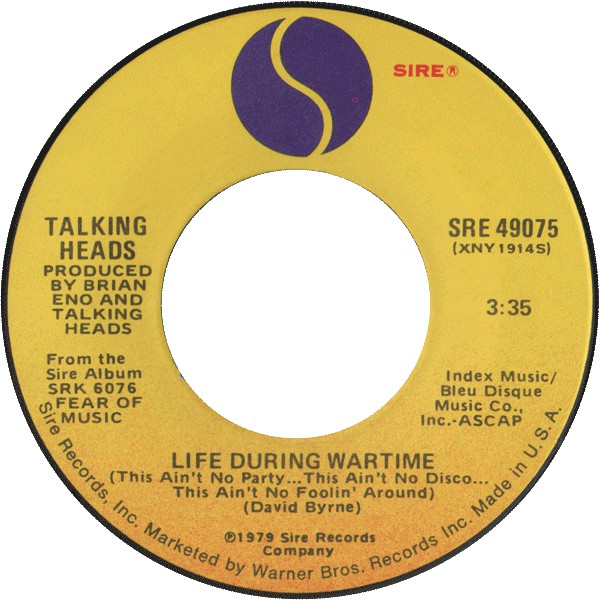
- U.S. vinyl single

"Life During Wartime" is a song by the American rock band Talking Heads, released on October 14, 1979, by Sire Records as the first single from their third studio album Fear of Music (1979). It entered the U.S. Billboard Pop Singles Chart on November 3, 1979, and peaked at No. 80, spending a total of five weeks on the chart.

The song is also performed in the film Stop Making Sense (1984), which depicts a Talking Heads concert. The performance featured in the film prominently features aerobic exercising and jogging by David Byrne and the backing vocalists. The Stop Making Sense live version of the track is featured in the film's accompanying soundtrack album. Its official title as a single, "Life During Wartime (This Ain't No Party... This Ain't No Disco... This Ain't No Foolin' Around)", makes it one of the longest-titled singles.

The song is included in The Rock and Roll Hall of Fame's 500 Songs that Shaped Rock and Roll.

== Origin ==
In David Bowman's book This Must Be the Place: The Adventures of Talking Heads in the Twentieth Century (2001), Byrne is quoted as describing the genesis of the song:

David wrote nine of the album's eleven tracks. Two numbers came out of jamming. The first would be called "Life During Wartime." David's lyrics describe a Walker Percy-ish post-apocalyptic landscape where a revolutionary hides out in a deserted cemetery, surviving on peanut butter. "I wrote this in my loft on Seventh and Avenue A," David later said, "I was thinking about Baader-Meinhof. Patty Hearst. Tompkins Square. This is a song about living in Alphabet City."

Record World called it "a brilliant futuristic treatise on urban guerilla warfare."

AllMusic's Bill Janowitz reviewed the song, calling attention to its nearness to funk, saying that it is a "sort of apocalyptic punk/funk merge" comparable to Prince's later hit single "1999". In 2012, The New Yorker described "Life During Wartime" as, "an apocalyptic swamp-funk transmission in four-four time," adding "[it] is the band’s pinnacle, and the song is still a hell of a thing to hear."

== Lyrics ==
The lyrics are told from the point of view of someone involved in clandestine activities in the U.S. (the cities Houston, Detroit, and Pittsburgh are mentioned) during some sort of civil unrest or dystopian environment.

The line "This ain't no Mudd Club or CBGB" refers to two New York music venues at which the band performed in the 1970s.

"The line 'This ain't no disco' sure stuck!" remarks Byrne in the liner notes of Once in a Lifetime: The Best of Talking Heads (1992). "Remember when they would build bonfires of Donna Summer records? Well, we liked some disco music! It's called 'dance music' now. Some of it was radical, camp, silly, transcendent and disposable. So it was funny that we were sometimes seen as the flag-bearers of the anti-disco movement."

== Critical reception ==
"Life During Wartime" is widely regarded as one of the band's best songs. In 2023, American Songwriter ranked the song No. 9 on their list of the 10 greatest Talking Heads songs, and in 2024, Paste ranked the song No. 4 on their list of the 30 greatest Talking Heads songs.

== Personnel ==
Talking Heads

- David Byrne – vocals, guitar
- Jerry Harrison – synthesizers
- Tina Weymouth – bass guitar
- Chris Frantz – drums

Additional musicians

- Gene Wilder – congas
- Ari – congas

== Charts ==
| Chart (1979) | Peak position |
|---|---|
| U.S. Billboard Hot 100 | 80 |

== Certifications ==
| Region | Certification | Certified units/sales |
|---|---|---|
| United States (RIAA) | Gold | 500,000^{‡} |
^{‡} Sales+streaming figures based on certification alone.

== Other versions ==
An alternative mix of the song, featuring prominent guitar playing by Robert Fripp of King Crimson, was released on the box set Talking Heads (2005) and the 2005 expanded CD reissue of Fear of Music. At 4:07 this version of the song is longer and does not fade out as early, with extra verses that are not heard in the original.

=== Live versions ===
- 1980 Remain in Light tour version, appeared on the 1982 live compilation album The Name Of This Band Is Talking Heads
- 1983 Stop Making Sense tour version, appeared on the album and film of the same name.
- 1992 David Byrne solo version, from the film Between the Teeth.
- 2001 David Byrne solo version appeared on the 2007 album and film Live from Austin, TX
- 2003 David Byrne solo version appeared on the Live at Union Chapel film.
- 2004 David Byrne and Caetano Veloso version, featured on the 2012 album Live at Carnegie Hall
- 2009 David Byrne solo version, featuring in the 2010 film Ride, Rise, Roar

=== Cover versions ===
- The Staple Singers covered this song on their eponymous 1985 album.
- Firewater released a cover of this song as a single in 2026.
