= Sounds from True Stories =

Soundtrack album by David Byrne / Various
- Released: 1986
- Studio: Russian Hill Studios, San Francisco, California; Caldwell Studios, Lubbock, Texas; Studio Southwest, Sunnyvale, Texas; Prodigal Sound, Denton, Texas
- Genre: Rock; Tejano
- Length: 40:17
- Label: Sire
- Producer: David Byrne

David Byrne chronology
Music for "The Knee Plays" (1985)	Sounds from True Stories (1986)	The Last Emperor (1987)

Professional ratings
Review scores
Source	Rating
AllMusic	3/5 stars

Sounds from True Stories, subtitled Music for Activities Freaks, is the soundtrack to American musician David Byrne's satirical musical comedy film True Stories (1986). It was initially released on vinyl and cassette, but was given a CD and 2×LP release in 2018.

The album is not a complete soundtrack recording, featuring only a couple of the vocal songs heard in the film, with the rest being instrumental music. Byrne's band Talking Heads released the album True Stories, which contained versions of the other songs in the film.

In 2018 the Criterion Collection Blu-ray release of the film includes a soundtrack CD that is listed as "containing the film’s complete soundtrack, compiled here for the first time".

== Track listing ==
Side one
No.	Title	Writer(s)	Performing artist	Length
1.	"Cocktail Desperado"	Terry Allen	Terry Allen and the Panhandle Mystery Band	2:58
2.	"Road Song"	Monk	Meredith Monk	3:25
3.	"Freeway Son"	David Byrne	David Byrne	3:05
4.	"Brownie's Theme"	David Byrne	David Byrne	2:24
5.	"Building a Highway"	Carl Finch	Carl Finch	1:45
6.	"Puppy Polka"	Carl Finch	Carl Finch	1:28
7.	"Party Girls"	Carl Finch	Carl Finch	2:16
8.	"Dinner Music"	Byrne/Bright	Kronos Quartet	3:30

Side two
No.	Title	Writer(s)	Performing artist	Length
9.	"Disco Hits!"	David Byrne	David Byrne	2:02
10.	"City of Steel"	David Byrne	David Byrne	3:33
11.	"Love Theme from True Stories"	David Byrne	David Byrne	1:26
12.	"Festa Para Um Rei Negro"	Zuzuca	Banda Eclipse	2:18
13.	"Buster's Theme"	Carl Finch	Carl Finch	2:33
14.	"Soy de Tejas"	Esteban Jordan	Esteban Jordan	2:45
15.	"I Love Metal Buildings"	David Byrne	David Byrne	2:18
16.	"Glass Operator"	David Byrne	David Byrne	2:31
Total length:				40:17

Complete Soundtrack
No.	Title	Performing artist	Length
1.	"Road Song"	David Byrne & Meredith Monk
2.	"Freeway Son"	David Byrne
3.	"Disco Hits!"	David Byrne
4.	"Cocktail Desperado"	Terry Allen and the Panhandle Mystery Band
5.	"Wild Wild Life"	Talking Heads
6.	"City of Steel"	Talking Heads, featuring Tommy Morrell
7.	"Mall Muzak"	Carl Finch
8.	"Dream Operator"	Talking Heads, featuring Annie McEnroe
9.	"Love Theme from True Stories"	David Byrne
10.	"Brownie's Theme"	David Byrne
11.	"Dinner Music"	Kronos Quartet
12.	"Puzzlin' Evidence"	Talking Heads, featuring John Ingle and the Bert Cross Choir
13.	"Glass Operator"	David Byrne
14.	"Hey Now"	Talking Heads, featuring St. Thomas Aquinas Elementary School Choir
15.	"I Love Metal Buildings"	David Byrne
16.	"Love for Sale"	Talking Heads
17.	"Soy De Tejas"	Esteban Jordan
18.	"Buster's Theme"	Carl Finch
19.	"Festa Para Um Rei Negro"	Banda Eclipse
20.	"Radio Head"	Talking Heads, featuring Tito Larriva, Esteban Jordan With Los Vampiros
21.	"Papa Legba"	Talking Heads, featuring Pops Staples
22.	"People Like Us"	Talking Heads, featuring John Goodman
23.	"City of Dreams"	Talking Heads

"Glass Operator" is an orchestral rendition of "Dream Operator" featuring a glass harmonica; "City of Steel" is a steel guitar version of "City of Dreams", which, along with "Dream Operator", appears on Talking Heads' True Stories.

== Personnel ==
- David Byrne: vocals, guitars, bass guitar on "Disco Hits!" and "I Love Metal Buildings"

Additional musicians

- Drums – Prairie Prince ("Disco Hits!" and "I Love Metal Buildings"), Steve Mitchell ("Freeway Son" and "Brownie's Theme"), Chris Frantz ("City of Steel"), Steve Jordan Jr. ("Soy de Tejas")
- Bass guitar – Rich Girard ("Freeway Son" and "Brownie's Theme"), Tina Weymouth ("City of Steel"), Steve Jordan ("Soy de Tejas")
- Guitar – Steve Erquiaga ("Freeway Son" and "Brownie's Theme"), Steve Jordan ("Soy de Tejas")
- Piano – Phil Aaberg ("Freeway Son" and "Brownie's Theme"), Jerry Harrison ("City of Steel"), Charles Judge ("I Love Metal Buildings")
- Pedal steel guitar – Joe Goldmark ("Freeway Son" and "I Love Metal Buildings"), Tommy Morrell ("City Of Steel")
- Violin – Dick Bright ("Freeway Son" and "Glass Operator"), David Harrington and John Sherba ("Dinner Music")
- Percussion – Michael Spiro ("Freeway Son" and "Disco Hits!")
- Cello – Joan Jeanrenaud ("Dinner Music"), Charles Judge ("Glass Operator")
- Harp – Marcella De Cray ("Dinner Music" and "Love Theme from True Stories")
- Keyboards – Charles Judge ("Disco Hits!"), Michael McClain ("Soy de Tejas")
- Accordion – Carl Finch ("Buster's Theme"), Steve Jordan ("Soy de Tejas")
- Bassoon – Greg Barber ("Road Song")
- Clarinet and bass clarinet – Jim Pukey ("Road Song")
- Flute, piccolo flute and alto flute – Charlie McCarthy ("Road Song")
- Oboe – Robin May ("Road Song")
- Viola – Hank Dutt ("Dinner Music")
- Concertinas – Paul Groff ("Love Theme from True Stories")
- Pan flutes – Fernando Torres ("Love Theme from True Stories")
- Glass harmonica – Terry Hinely ("Glass Operator")

Technical

- Engineers – Jack Leahy (tracks 2–4, 8–9, 11, 15–16), Michael McClain (tracks 5–7, 10, 12, 14), Don Caldwell ("Cocktail Desperado") and David Rosenblad ("Buster's Theme")
- Assistant engineers – Gary Clayton, Jeff Kliment, Mark Roule and Sam Lehmer
- Mastered by Roy Halee and Jack Skinner
- Mixed by Roy Halee

Artwork

- Art direction – Concept Arts and Lucinda Cowell
- Design – David Byrne and Michael Hodgson
- Front cover photograph – Annie Liebowitz
- Back cover photograph – David Byrne, Christina Patoski, Mark Lipson
