= Live at Carnegie Hall (David Byrne and Caetano Veloso album) =

Live album by Caetano Veloso and David Byrne
- Released: March 12, 2012
- Recorded: April 17, 2004
- Venue: Carnegie Hall (New York City)
- Genres: Alternative rock; Música popular brasileira; tropicália
- Length: 70:23
- Languages: English, Portuguese
- Label: Nonesuch
- Producers: Caetano Veloso; David Byrne

David Byrne chronology
Here Lies Love (2010)	Live at Carnegie Hall (2012)	Love This Giant (2012)

Caetano Veloso chronology
Zii e Zie (2009)	Live at Carnegie Hall (2012)	Abraçaço (2012)

Professional ratings
Aggregate scores
Source	Rating
Metacritic	70/100
Review scores
Source	Rating
Chicago Tribune	2.5/4 stars
The Guardian	4/5 stars
Herald Scotland	Mixed
Los Angeles Times	Positive
MusicOMH	3/5 stars
New York Daily News	Positive
The Observer	4/5 stars
The Seattle Times	Positive

Live at Carnegie Hall is a 2012 collaborative album recorded by Brazilian singer-songwriter Caetano Veloso and American musician David Byrne at New York City's Carnegie Hall as a part of their 2004 Perspectives series. Veloso was invited to curate a performance and he invited Byrne, who in turn performed a solo set of his own as well as collaborative work between them. The album was released on Nonesuch Records on March 12, 2012.

== Track listing ==
Caetano Veloso

1. "Desde Que o Samba é Samba" (Caetano Veloso) – 4:47
2. "Você é Linda" (Veloso) – 4:09
3. "Sampa" (Veloso) – 3:53
4. "O Leãozinho" (Veloso) – 3:05
5. "Coração Vagabundo" (Veloso) – 2:55
6. "Manhatã" (Veloso) – 4:10

David Byrne

7. "The Revolution" (David Byrne) – 2:31
8. "Everyone's in Love with You" (Byrne) – 1:51
9. "And She Was" (Byrne) – 3:57
10. "She Only Sleeps" (Byrne) – 3:22
11. "Life During Wartime" (Byrne, Chris Frantz, Jerry Harrison, and Tina Weymouth) – 4:20
12. "God's Child" (Byrne) – 4:27
13. "Road to Nowhere" (Byrne) – 3:44

Byrne and Veloso

14. "Dreamworld: Marco de Canaveses" (Byrne and Veloso) – 4:55
15. "Um Canto de Afoxé para o Bloco de Ilê" (Caetano Veloso and Moreno Veloso) – 3:35
16. "(Nothing But) Flowers" (Byrne, Frantz, Harrison, Yves N'Jock, and Weymouth) – 4:59
17. "Terra" (Veloso) – 5:54
18. "Heaven" (Byrne) – 3:56

== Personnel ==
- David Byrne – vocals and acoustic guitar
- Caetano Veloso – vocals and acoustic guitar

Additional musicians

- Jaques Morelenbaum – cello
- Mauro Refosco – percussion

Technical personnel

- Caetano Veloso and David Byrne – production
- Robert Hurwitz – executive producer
- Tom Lazarus – recording and mixing
- Robert Ludwig at Gateway Mastering Studios, Portland, Maine, United States – mastering
- John Gall – design
- Chris Lee – photography
