= Zii e Zie =

Studio album by Caetano Veloso
- Released: 14 April 2009
- Genre: MPB, alternative rock
- Label: Universal Records
- Producer: Caetano Veloso and BandaCê

Caetano Veloso chronology
Cê ao vivo (2005)	Zii e Zie (2009)	Live at Carnegie Hall (2012)

Zii e Zie is an album by Brazilian singer, songwriter, and guitarist Caetano Veloso, released on 14 April 2009 on Universal Records. The album won the 2009 Latin Grammy Award of Best Singer-Songwriter Album and the song "A Cor Amarela" was nominated for Latin Grammy Award for Best Brazilian Song in the same year. The album was also featured on the list of best 2009 Brazilian albums of Rolling Stone Brasil and the song "Incompatibilidade de Gênios" was also elected by the magazine as the 13th best Brazilian song of the same year.

Zii e Zie is Italian for "Uncles and Aunts". The songs were labeled as "transsambas", because the album is samba-driven. Veloso and his band paid a tribute to Rio de Janeiro. Veloso described the album as "very clear and dense, with melodic phrases". Zii e Zie was based on many shows by the band of their "Obra em Progresso" (work in progress), which has an official blog. registering the creative process of the album.

== Track listing ==
1. "Perdeu" - 6:49
2. "Sem Cais" - 2:36
3. "Por Quem?" - 5:43
4. "Lobão Tem Razão" - 4:05
5. "A Cor Amarela" - 2:16
6. "A Base de Guantánamo" - 4:25
7. "Falso Leblon" - 2:42
8. "Incompatibilidade de Gênios" - 5:24
9. "Tarado ni Você" - 4:30
10. "Menina da Ria" - 2:19
11. "Ingenuidade" - 3:54
12. "Lapa" - 4:39
13. "Diferentemente" - 2:43

== Personnel ==
- Caetano Veloso – lead vocals, acoustic guitar, handclaps
- Pedro Sá – electric guitar, backing vocals, handclaps
- Ricardo Dias Gomes – bass, backing vocals, Fender Rhodes electric piano, handclaps
- Marcelo Callado – drums, backing vocals, handclaps

== Charts ==
Chart (2009)	Peak position
Portuguese Albums (AFP)	22
