= The Visible Man (album) =

Remix album by David Byrne
- Released: 1997
- Genre: Experimental; rock
- Length: 47:28
- Label: Luaka Bop

David Byrne chronology
Feelings (1997)	The Visible Man (1997)	In Spite of Wishing and Wanting (1999)

Professional ratings
Review scores
Source	Rating
AllMusic	2.5/5 stars

The Visible Man is a remix album by American musician David Byrne, released in 1997 by Luaka Bop. It includes nine remixes of six songs from his previous studio album, Feelings. In his AllMusic review Christian Huey said, "A few bright spots manage to shine through this otherwise standard remix album."

== Track listing ==
1. "Fuzzy Freaky" – 6:53 (remixed by DJ Food)
2. "Fuzzy Freaky" – 2:50 (remixed by Mark Walk & Ruby)
3. "Wicked Little Doll" – 4:11 (remixed by New Kingdom)
4. "Dance on Vaseline" – 5:50 (remixed by Thievery Corp.)
5. "You Don't Know Me" – 5:50 (remixed by B-boy 3000)
6. "You Don't Know Me" – 5:00 (remixed by Lloop)
7. "Miss America" – 5:40 (remixed by Cecco Music)
8. "Miss America" – 5:54 (remixed by Mark Saunders & DB)
9. "Amnesia" – 5:20 (remixed by Rea Mochiach)
