= In Spite of Wishing and Wanting =

Soundtrack album by David Byrne
- Released: 1999
- Length: 55:04
- Label: Luaka Bop
- Producer: David Byrne

David Byrne chronology
The Visible Man (1997)	In Spite of Wishing and Wanting (1999)	Look into the Eyeball (2001)

In Spite of Wishing and Wanting is a 1999 soundtrack by American musician David Byrne for the performance of the same name by the Ultima Vez dance company. It features original compositions as well as two remixes from Byrne's previous studio album Feelings (1997). Byrne sold the album through his web site and live performances for a limited time.

As indicated in the liner notes, Byrne first saw Ultima Vez in Seattle in 1991 and kept in contact for several years before deciding to write the music for a show based on the fiction of Julio Cortázar.

== Critical reception ==
Writing for The New York Times, Anna Kissingoff explored the live performance and when reviewing Byrne's soundtrack, she wrote that it "includes the sound effects he calls ambient sound, offers a strong pulse, and its vocal fragments seem to lure the listener into a wind tunnel. It serves its purpose."

== Track listing ==
All tracks composed by David Byrne, except where noted

1. "Horses" – 4:31
2. "Sleeping Up" – 12:13
3. "Speech" – 5:26
4. "Saïd & the Ants" – 4:18
5. "Fear" – 2:32
6. "Fuzzy Freaky" (DJ Food Mix) (Byrne, Danielle Fossatti) – 6:19
7. "Danceonvaselinesuperextendedremix" – 19:45

== Personnel ==
- David Byrne – vocals, guitar, bass guitar, programming, sampling, production
- Ad Cominotto – accordion, organ
- Paul De Clerck – viola
- François Deppe – cello
- DJ Food – remixing on "Fuzzy Freaky" (DJ Food Mix)
- Didier Fontaine – drums, percussion
- Morcheeba Productions – production on "Danceonvaselinesuperextendedremix"
- Eric Sleichim – baritone saxophone
- Pierre Vervloesem – bass guitar
