= Grown Backwards =

2004 album by David Byrne

Studio album by David Byrne
- Released: March 16, 2004
- Recorded: Kampo Studios, New York City; strings recorded at Tequila Mockingbird, Austin, Texas and several other locations
- Genres: Art pop; chamber pop; orchestral pop; baroque pop; opera
- Length: 57:46
- Languages: English, French ("Au fond du Temple Saint"), Italian ("Un Dì, Felice, Eterea")
- Labels: Nonesuch; Warner Bros.
- Producers: David Byrne; Patrick Dillett

David Byrne chronology
Lead Us Not into Temptation (2003)	Grown Backwards (2004)	David Byrne Live at Union Chapel (2004)

Grown Backwards is the seventh studio album by the American musician David Byrne, released on March 16, 2004.

== Critical reception ==
Professional ratings
Aggregate scores
Source	Rating
Metacritic	78/100
Review scores
Source	Rating
AllMusic	4/5 stars
Cokemachineglow	80%
E!	B+
Entertainment Weekly	B+
The Guardian	4/5 stars
Mojo	4/5 stars
Pitchfork	7.6/10
Q	3.5/5 stars
Rolling Stone	3/5 stars
Uncut	7/10

According to the review aggregator Metacritic, Grown Backwards received "generally favorable reviews" based on a weighted average score of 78 out of 100 from 17 critic scores.

In 2010, Byrne wrote in his book How Music Works it has sold 127,000 physical albums, 8,000 digital albums and 53,000 digital singles (overall 140,000 units sold of albums). The album peaked at #178 and #88 in the US and UK respectively. The album was released on vinyl for the first time on March 15, 2019.

== Track listing ==
All tracks written by David Byrne, except where noted.

1. "Glass, Concrete & Stone" – 4:13
2. "The Man Who Loved Beer" (Donald Charles Book and Kurt Wagner of Lambchop) – 2:41
3. "Au fond du temple saint" (From Les pêcheurs de perles) – 4:49
4. "Empire" – 4:12
5. "Tiny Apocalypse" – 4:03
6. "She Only Sleeps" – 2:57
7. "Dialog Box" – 3:30
8. "The Other Side of this Life" – 4:00
9. "Why" – 2:54
10. "Pirates" – 3:52
11. "Civilization" – 3:17
12. "Astronaut" – 2:55
13. "Glad" – 1:58
14. "Un Dì, Felice, Eterea" (Giuseppe Verdi, from La Traviata) – 2:51
15. "Lazy" (bonus track) (Byrne/X-Press 2) – 9:35

== Personnel ==
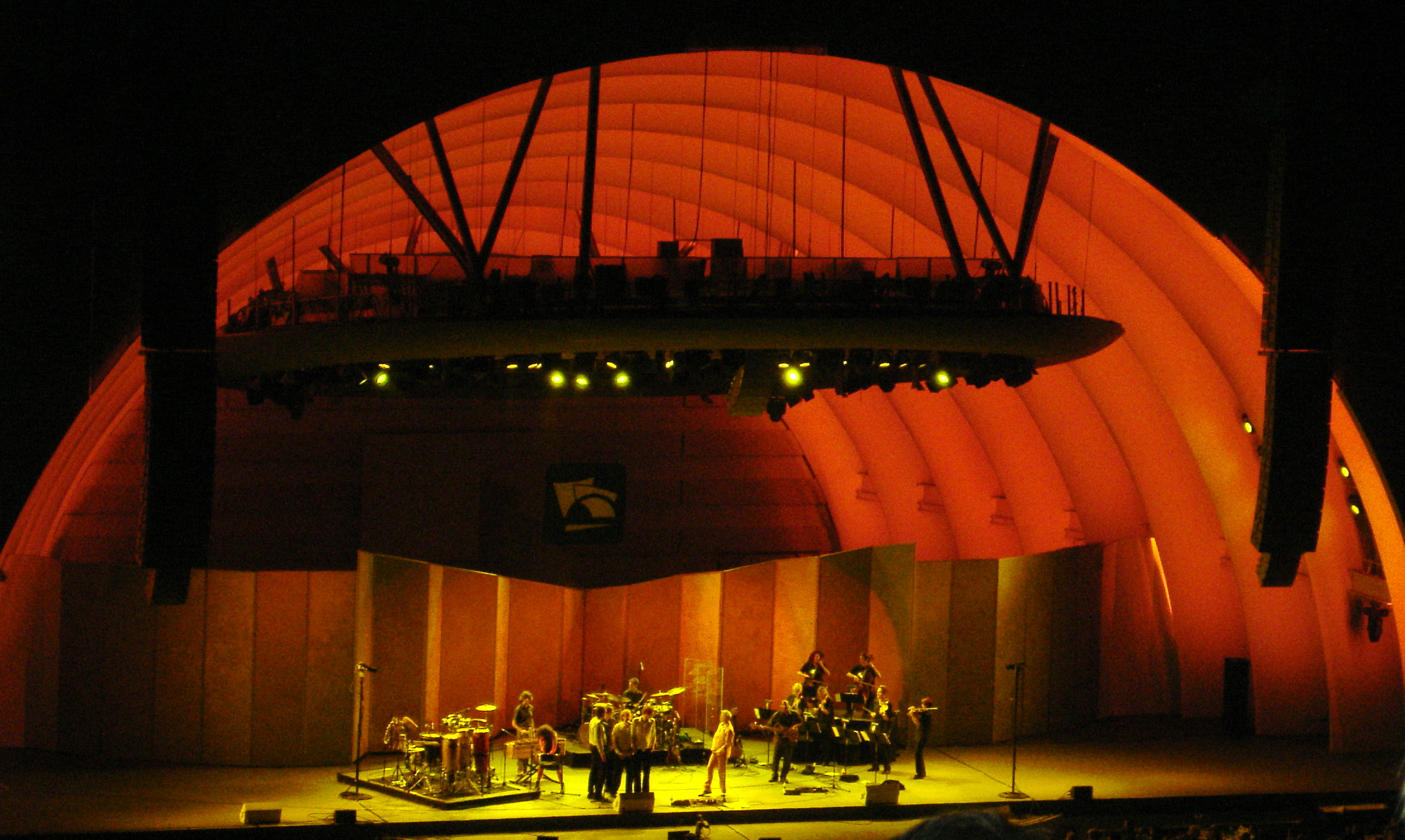
Byrne on the My Backwards Life tour with Tosca Strings

"Glass, Concrete & Stone"

- David Byrne – vocals, nylon-string guitar
- David Hilliard – hi-hat
- Mauro Refosco – marimba, percussion
- Jane Scarpantoni – cello

Recorded at Loveshack Studio, New York City

"The Man Who Loved Beer"

- Elaine Barber – harp
- David Byrne – vocals, electric guitar
- Paul Frazier – bass guitar
- Mike Maddox – accordion
- Freddie Mendoza – trombone, euphonium
- John Mills – clarinet, bass clarinet, flute
- Mauro Refosco – percussion
- The Tosca Strings:

- Ames Asbell – viola
- Jamie Desautels – violin
- Douglas Harvey – cello
- Leigh Mahoney – violin
- Sara Nelson – cello
- Tracy Seeger – violin

Recorded at Avatar, New York City

"Au Fond du Temple Saint"

- Elaine Barber – harp
- Stephen Barber – prepared piano
- Tom Burritt – marimba, tympani
- David Byrne – vocals
- Pamelia Kurstin – theremin
- Mike Maddox – accordion
- Freddie Mendoza – trombone, euphonium
- John Mills – clarinet, bass clarinet, flute
- The Tosca Strings
- Rufus Wainwright – vocals

"Empire"

- Ray Anderson – trombone
- David Byrne – vocals, dobro
- Alex Foster – tenor saxophone
- Earl Gardner – trumpet
- Vincent Herring – alto saxophone
- Karen Mantler – organ
- Keith O'Quinn – trombone
- Bob Routch – French horn
- Gary Smulyan – baritone saxophone
- Lew Soloff – trumpet
- Bob Stewart – tuba
- Steve Swallow – bass guitar

Recorded RPM Studio, New York City

"Tiny Apocalypse"

- Lisa Aferiat – violin
- Georgia Boyd – viola
- Barry Burns – spacey guitar, Rhodes
- David Byrne – vocals, Rhodes
- Donald Gillan – cello
- Robert Irvine – cello
- Greg Lawson – violin
- Una McGlone – bass
- Johnny Quinn – drum kit
- Fiona Stephen – violin

Recorded at CaVa Sound Workshops, Glasgow

"She Only Sleeps"

- David Byrne – vocals, electric guitar
- Joe Cooper – percussion
- Paul Godfrey – sequencing
- Ross Godfrey – keyboards
- Andy Waterworth – bass guitar

Recorded at Cheeba Central, London Produced by Morcheeba Productions

"Dialog Box"

- Jon Blondell – trombone
- David Byrne – vocals, electric guitars
- Paul Frazier – bass guitar
- John Mills – baritone sax
- Mauro Refosco – percussion
- Steve Williams – drum kit

Recorded at Avatar, New York City, horns recorded at Congress House Studio, Austin, Texas

"The Other Side of This Life"

- Elaine Barber – harp
- David Byrne – vocals, semi-nylon guitar
- Paul Frazier – bass guitar
- Mauro Refosco – percussion, samples, kitchen implements
- The Tosca Strings
- Steve Williams – drum kit, cowbell

Recorded at Avatar, New York City

"Why"

- David Byrne – vocals, electric guitar, programming
- Paul Frazier – bass guitar
- Mauro Refosco – percussion
- Jon Spurney – keyboards
- The Tosca Strings
- Kenny Wollesen – drum kit

Drums recorded at Skyline, New York City

"Pirates"

- Jon Blondell – trombone
- David Byrne – vocals, acoustic guitar
- Paul Frazier – bass
- John Mills – baritone sax
- Mauro Refosco – percussion
- The Tosca Strings
- Kenny Wollesen – drum kit

Drums recorded at Skyline, New York City, horns recorded at Congress House Studio

"Civilization"

- David Byrne – vocals, acoustic guitar
- Paul Frazier – bass
- Alan Ford – vacuum cleaner
- John Linnell – accordion
- Mauro Refosco – percussion
- Kenny Wollesen – drum kit, slit drum

Drums recorded at Skyline, New York City

"Astronaut"

- David Byrne – vocals, electric guitar
- Paul Frazier – bass guitar
- Pamelia Kurstin – theremin
- Mauro Refosco – percussion
- Steve Williams – percussion

"Glad"

- Jon Blondell – trombone
- David Byrne – vocals, nylon-string guitar
- Paul Frazier – bass
- John Mills – clarinet, bass clarinet
- Mauro Refosco – percussion
- The Tosca Strings
- Steve Williams – spaghetti percussion

Horns recorded at Congress House Studio

"Un di Felice, Eterea"

- David Byrne – vocals
- David Creswell – viola
- Katherine Fong – violin
- Soo Hyun Kwon – violin
- Dawn Hannay – viola
- Philip Myers – French horn
- Mark Nuccio – clarinet
- Sandra Park – violin
- John Patitucci – bass guitar
- Alan Stepansky – cellos
- Jeremy Turner – cellos
- Jon Vercesi – Rhodes
- Shelly Woodworth – oboe, English horn
- Sharon Yamada – violin

Recorded at Sound on Sound, New York City

"Lazy"

- David Byrne – vocals, electric guitar, keyboards, drum programming
- Patrick Dillett – background vocals
- Paul Frazier – bass
- Mauro Refosco – percussion
- The Tosca Strings
- Steve Williams – drum triggers
