= Lead Us Not into Temptation =

Soundtrack album by David Byrne
- Released: September 30, 2003
- Recorded: CaVa Sound Workshops (Glasgow)
- Genre: Score
- Length: 51:02 (CD), 40:50 (LP)
- Label: Thrill Jockey
- Producer: David Byrne

David Byrne chronology
Look into the Eyeball (2001)	Lead Us Not into Temptation (2003)	Grown Backwards (2004)

Professional ratings
Aggregate scores
Source	Rating
Metacritic	79/100
Review scores
Source	Rating
AllMusic	4/5 stars
Entertainment Weekly	B+
Filter	85%
Mojo	3.5/5 stars
Pitchfork	7.9/10
Q	4/5 stars
Uncut	8/10

Lead Us Not into Temptation is an album by American musician David Byrne, released in 2003 for the movie Young Adam, a film directed by David Mackenzie.

== Track listing ==
All songs written by David Byrne except where noted.

CD tracklist
No.	Title	Length
1.	"Body in a River"	2:53
2.	"Mnemonic Discordance"	2:43
3.	"Seaside Smokes"	3:08
4.	"Canal Life"	2:28
5.	"Locks & Barges"	2:00
6.	"Haitian Fight Song" (Charles Mingus)	2:50
7.	"Sex on the Docks"	4:25
8.	"Inexorable"	2:20
9.	"Warm Sheets"	3:01
10.	"Dirty Hair"	4:48
11.	"Bastard"	2:57
12.	"The Lodger"	4:16
13.	"Ineluctable"	4:20
14.	"Speechless"	4:04
15.	"The Great Western Road"	4:44

LP tracklist
No.	Title	Length
1.	"Body in a River"	2:53
2.	"Mnemonic Discordance"	2:43
3.	"Seaside Smokes"	3:08
4.	"Canal Life"	2:28
5.	"Locks & Barges"	2:00
6.	"Sex on the Docks"	4:25
7.	"Warm Sheets"	3:01
8.	"Inexorable"	2:20
9.	"Dirty Hair"	4:48
10.	"The Lodger"	4:16
11.	"Speechless"	4:04
12.	"The Great Western Road"	4:44

"Haitian Fight Song," "Bastard" and "Ineluctable" were not included on the vinyl edition.

== Personnel ==
- Lisa Aferiat – violin
- Caroline Barber – cello
- Georgia Boyd – viola
- Barry Burns – keyboards, piano, guitar, Hammond organ, Rhodes
- David Byrne: vocals and guitar
- Richard Colburn – percussion, Drum kit on "Speechless"
- Donald Gillan – cello
- Hung Drawn Quartet on "Haitian Fight Song"
- Allon Beauvoisin: baritone saxophone
- Stuart Brown: drums
- Keith Edwards: alto saxophone
- George Lyle: bass guitar
- Raymond MacDonald: alto saxophone
- Graeme Wilson: tenor saxophone
- Robert Irvine – cello
- Greg Lawson – violin
- Una McGlone – bass guitar
- Gregor Philp – samples
- Johnny Quinn – drum kit, percussion on "Bastard", and tympani on "Inexorable"
- Alasdair Roberts – hurdy-gurdy on "Sex on the Docks"
- John Somerville – accordion
- Fiona Stephen – violin
- Malcolm Lindsay & David Byrne - string arrangements

== Release history ==
Region	Date	Label	Format	Catalog
Worldwide	2003-09-30	Thrill Jockey	CD	133
Worldwide	2003-09-30	Thrill Jockey	LP	133
