= Like Humans Do =

Single by David Byrne

Single by David Byrne

from the album Look into the Eyeball
- A-side: "Like Humans Do"
- B-side: "All Over Me"; "Princess"
- Released: September 18, 2001
- Genre: Alternative rock; folk rock; art rock
- Length: 3:32
- Label: Virgin; Luaka Bop
- Songwriter: David Byrne
- Producer: Michael Mangini

David Byrne singles chronology
"Miss America" (1997)	"Like Humans Do" (2001)	"U.B. Jesus" (2001)

Official audio
- "Like Humans Do" on YouTube

"Like Humans Do" is the fourth track from American musician David Byrne's sixth studio album Look into the Eyeball and was also released as a single in 2001. Most notably, the radio edit version of the song (which omits the line referring to cannabis) was selected by Microsoft as the sample music for Windows XP to demonstrate the version 8 of Windows Media Player, though it was only included in early releases of the operating system. It was also included as a sample track on the Rio Karma media player.

The song was also featured on Byrne's 2007 live album Live from Austin, Texas and 2004's Live at Union Chapel. In the latter film, he explains that the song is about trying to love human beings despite their failings, by taking a "Martian's perspective" on humanity and trying to accept them for what they are.

== Track listing ==
1. "Like Humans Do" (Radio Edit)
2. "All Over Me"
3. "Princess"

Notes

- The B-sides were later appended to a re-release of Look into the Eyeball.

== Personnel ==
The song was written by David Byrne and arranged by Thom Bell, with string and horn contracting by Sandra Park.

- David Byrne – vocals, guitar
- Nick Cords – viola
- Bruno Eicher – violin
- Paul Frazier – bass guitar
- Dawn Hannay – viola
- Vivek Kamath – viola
- Lisa Kim – violin
- Eileen Moon – cello
- Suzanne Ornstein – violin
- Sandra Park – violin
- Dan Reed – violin
- Robert Rinehart – viola
- Laura Seaton – violin
- Fiona Simon – violin
- Alan Stepanksy – cello
- Sharon Yamada – violin
- Herb Besson – trombone
- Bob Carlisle – French horn
- Michael Davis – trombone
- Jim Hayes – trumpet
- Rodd Kadleck – trumpet
- Stewart Rose – French horn
- Karen Griffin – piccolo
- Roger Rosenberg – baritone saxophone
- Shawn Pelton – drums
- Mauro Refosco – percussion

== Release history ==
Region	Date	Label	Format	Catalog
United States	September 18, 2001	EMI Records	Compact Disc	897529
