= The Forest (album) =

Soundtrack album by David Byrne
- Released: June 1991
- Recorded: 1990–91
- Genre: Classical
- Length: 61:34
- Labels: Luaka Bop; Warner Bros.

David Byrne chronology
Rei Momo (1989)	The Forest (1991)	Uh-Oh (1992)

The Forest is a mostly instrumental album by the American musician David Byrne, released in June 1991, inspired by the Epic of Gilgamesh and set during the later Industrial Revolution. Some of the music from this orchestral album was originally used in a Robert Wilson directed theatre piece with the same name. The Forest premiered at the Theater der Freien Volksbühne, West Berlin in 1988.

Professional ratings
Review scores
Source	Rating
AllMusic	link
NME	5/10

== Track listing ==
All tracks composed by David Byrne

No.	Title	Length
1.	"Ur"	13:08
2.	"Kish"	5:47
3.	"Dura Europus"	3:27
4.	"Samara"	5:40
5.	"Nineveh"	3:34
6.	"Ava"	12:14
7.	"Machu Picchu"	3:14
8.	"Tula"	4:20
9.	"Teotihuacan"	2:37
10.	"Asuka"	7:33

== Release history ==
Region	Date	Label	Format	Catalog
Worldwide	1991	Luaka Bop/Warner Bros.	LP	7599-26584
Worldwide	1991	Luaka Bop/Warner Bros.	CD	26584
Worldwide	1991	Luaka Bop/Warner Bros.	Cassette tape	4-26584
Worldwide	2005	Sire	CD	?

== "Forestry" ==
"Forestry" is a maxi-single by David Byrne containing dance and industrial remixes of pieces from The Forest by Jack Dangers, Rudy Tambala, and Anthony Capel.

- Art direction by Robin Lynch and David Byrne.
- Design by Robin Lynch.
- Front cover, "Feed Pump Pipework, Hinkley Point" by Douglass Allen.
- Back cover, "Fodermaschinist" Deutsches Bergbau-Museum Bochum.
- Inside, "The Forest" by David Byrne.

Track listing

1. "Ava" – Nu Wage Remix – Jack Dangers
2. "Nineveh" – Industrial Mix – Jack Dangers
3. "Ava" – Less Space Dance Mix Edit – Rudy Tambala / Anthony Capel
4. "Ava" – Space Dance Mix – Rudy Tambala / Anthony Capel
5. "Machu Picchu" – Album Version
