= Uh-Oh (David Byrne album) =

Studio album by David Byrne
- Released: March 3, 1992
- Recorded: April 1991–October 1991
- Genre: Art rock; alternative rock; worldbeat
- Length: 52:47
- Label: Luaka Bop; Warner Bros.
- Producer: Nick Launay

David Byrne chronology
The Forest (1991)	Uh-Oh (1992)	David Byrne (1994)

Singles from Uh-Oh
- 1. "Hanging Upside Down" Released: 1992; 2. "She's Mad" Released: 1992; 3. "Girls On My Mind" Released: 1992

Professional ratings
Review scores
Source	Rating
AllMusic	3/5 stars
Chicago Tribune	2/4 stars
Robert Christgau	(dud)
The Encyclopedia of Popular Music	3/5 stars
Entertainment Weekly	A-
MusicHound Rock: The Essential Album Guide	4/5 stars
NME	6/10
The Rolling Stone Album Guide	3/5 stars
Spin Alternative Record Guide	5/10

Uh-Oh is the second studio album by American musician David Byrne, released in 1992.

The album peaked at No. 125 on the Billboard 200. The single "She's Mad" reached No. 3 on the U.S. Modern Rock Tracks chart.

== Production ==
The album was produced by Nick Launay. The cover portrays angels gathered around a cartoon dog (god spelled backward).

== Critical reception ==
The New York Times wrote that "Byrne has finally figured out how to make the wacky Pan-American dance album he's been after since the mid-1980's." The Guardian deemed Uh-Oh "the most Talking-Heads-esque of Byrne’s solo albums, albeit with a Latin-American influence." The Washington Post thought that Byrne's "yelps, which range from intentionally comic to comically arty, rarely dominate their rhythmically dense, albeit melodically bland, settings." The Orlando Sentinel wrote that the "Afro-Brazilian influences are more fully integrated now than on 1989's Rei Momo."

The track "A Million Miles Away" was used as the theme song of the TV show Flying Blind.

== Track listing ==
All tracks composed by David Byrne; except where indicated

No.	Title	Length
1.	"Now I'm Your Mom" (Byrne, Angel Fernandez)	4:43
2.	"Girls on My Mind"	3:52
3.	"Something Ain't Right" (Byrne, Terry Allen)	3:37
4.	"She's Mad"	5:20
5.	"Hanging Upside Down" (Byrne, Fernandez)	4:31
6.	"A Walk in the Dark"	4:21
7.	"Twistin' in the Wind"	4:14
8.	"The Cowboy Mambo (Hey Lookit Me Now)"	3:37
9.	"Monkey Man"	4:07
10.	"A Million Miles Away"	4:24
11.	"Tiny Town" (Byrne, Fernandez)	5:03
12.	"Somebody"	4:59

== Personnel ==
- David Byrne – Vocals and guitar
- Nona Hendryx – Background vocals
- Dolette McDonald – Background vocals
- Joyce Bowden - Background vocals
- George Porter Jr. – Bass guitar
- Angel Fernandez – Trumpet
- Tom Zé – Percussion instruments
- Arranged By – Angel Fernandez (tracks: 6, 11, 12), David Byrne (tracks: 6, 11, 12)
- Arranged By [Horns, Woodwinds & Strings], Conductor [Horns, Woodwinds & Strings] – Angel Fernandez (tracks: 1, 2, 4 to 12)
- Artwork [Drawings] – Mr. Chick, Scott Stowell
- Backing Vocals – Billy Cliff (tracks: 3, 7, 12), Dolette McDonald (tracks: 1, 3, 7, 9, 10, 12), John James (5) (tracks: 3, 7, 12), Joyce L. Bowden (tracks: 1, 9, 10), Nicky Holland (tracks: 4, 8, 11), Nona Hendryx (tracks: 3, 7, 12)
- Bata – Milton Cardona (tracks: 4)
- Bongos, Percussion [Blocks], Bells [Bell], Agogô [Ago-go], Tamborim, Surdo [Surdu] – Café
- Clarinet [Bass] – Ronnie Cuber (tracks: 1, 6, 11)
- Congas, Maracas, Triangle, Percussion [Tambora] – Hector Rosado
- Drums, Timbales, Cowbell, Percussion [Woodblock], Surdo [Surdu], Bells [Bell], Shaker [Shakere] – Oscar Salas
- Flugelhorn – Angel Fernandez (tracks: 1, 11)
- Flute, Clarinet – Steve Sacks (tracks: 1, 11)
- French Horn – Fred Griffen (tracks: 1, 11), John Clark (2) (tracks: 1, 11)
- Oboe – Melanie Feld (tracks: 1, 11)
- Saxophone [Alto] – Dick Oatts (tracks: 3, 9, 12), Steve Sacks (tracks: 3, 5, 8)
- Saxophone [Baritone] – Ronnie Cuber (tracks: 5, 8, 9, 12)
- Saxophone [Tenor] – Ken Hitchcock (tracks: 9, 12), Lawrence Feldman (tracks: 5, 8)
- Synthesizer, Clavinet, Vibraphone [Vibes] – Ashley Cadell
- Trombone – Christopher Washburne (tracks: 5, 8, 9, 12), Gerald Chamberlain (tracks: 4, 12)
- Trombone [Tenor] – Christopher Washburne (tracks: 3, 11)
- Trumpet – Ite Jerez* (tracks: 4, 5, 8, 9, 12), Angel Fernandez (tracks: 4, 5, 8, 9, 12), Charlie Sepulveda (tracks: 3, 11), Joe Shepley (tracks: 3, 4, 9, 12)
- Vocals, Acoustic Guitar, Electric Guitar, Effects [Prepared Pens], Whistle – David Byrne
- Written-By – Angel Fernandez (tracks: 1, 5, 11), David Byrne, Terry Allen (tracks: 3)
- Engineer [Assistant At Electric Lady] – Michael White
- Engineer [Assistant At Platinum Island] – Axel Niehaus
- Engineer [Assistant At Power Station] – Dan Gellart
- Engineer [Assistant At Sigma Sound] – Brian Kinkead, Michael Scalcione
- Engineer [Assistant At The Hit Factory] – Michael Gilbert
- Mastered By – Bob Ludwig
- Producer, Recorded By, Mixed By – Nick Launay
- Painting [Cover Painting] – Brian Dewan
- Photography By [Band Photos] – David Byrne
- Photography By [David Byrne Photo] – Chris Nofzinger

== Release history ==
Region	Date	Label	Format	Catalog
Worldwide	1991	Luaka Bop/Warner Bros.	CD	26799
Worldwide	1991	Luaka Bop/Warner Bros.	Cassette tape	4-26799
Worldwide	1992	Luaka Bop/Warner Bros.	CD	926799
Worldwide	1992	Luaka Bop/Warner Bros.	CD	26799
Worldwide	1995	Luaka Bop/Warner Bros.	CD	7599-26799
