= David Byrne (album) =

Studio album by David Byrne
- Released: May 24, 1994
- Recorded: November–December 1993
- Genres: Alternative rock; art rock
- Length: 51:06
- Labels: Luaka Bop; Warner Bros.
- Producers: Arto Lindsay; David Byrne; Susan Rogers

David Byrne chronology
Uh-Oh (1992)	David Byrne (1994)	Feelings (1997)

Singles from David Byrne
- 1. "Angels" Released: 1994; 2. "Back in the Box" Released: 1994; 3. "Sad Song" Released: 1994 (Germany and Spain); 4. "Lilies of the Valley" Released: 1994

Professional ratings
Review scores
Source	Rating
AllMusic	2/5 stars

David Byrne is the fourth studio album by American musician David Byrne, released on May 24, 1994. "Angels" and "Back in the Box" were the two main singles released from the album. The first one entered the U.S. Modern Rock Tracks chart, reaching No. 24. The album spent six weeks on the Billboard 200 chart.

Part of the song "Lilies of the Valley" can be heard sampled on Talib Kweli's "Right About Now", the leadoff track from his 2006 Right About Now: The Official Sucka Free Mix CD.

The music video for "Angels" appeared in an episode of Beavis and Butt-Head.

== Track listing ==
All tracks written by David Byrne.

No.	Title	Length
1.	"A Long Time Ago"	3:27
2.	"Angels"	4:43
3.	"Crash"	4:28
4.	"A Self-made Man"	3:51
5.	"Back in the Box"	4:24
6.	"Sad Song"	3:03
7.	"Nothing at All"	4:51
8.	"My Love Is You"	2:01
9.	"Lilies of the Valley"	4:28
10.	"You & Eye"	5:08
11.	"Strange Ritual"	6:51
12.	"Buck Naked"	3:51

== Personnel ==
- David Byrne – vocals, guitar, synthesizer (1), clavinet (10), bells (2), balafon (2), lap steel guitar (4)
- Mark Edwards – drones
- Bebel Gilberto – background vocals
- Sue Hadjopoulos – percussion
- Bashiri Johnson – percussion, bongos, chimes, conga, shaker
- Arto Lindsay – guitar
- Dolette McDonald – background vocals
- John Medeski – organ, synthesizer, Farfisa
- Valerie Naranjo – drums, percussion, marimba, shaker, talking drum, percussion sampling
- Marcus Rojas – tuba
- Paul Socolow – bass
- Todd Turkisher – drums, percussion, surdo, sampling, doumbek, roto toms, frame drum, trash cans
- Bill Ware – marimba, vibraphone

== Release history ==
Region	Date	Label	Format	Catalog
Worldwide	1994	Luaka Bop/Warner Bros.	CD	45558
Worldwide	1994	Luaka Bop/Warner Bros.	Cassette tape	45558
Worldwide	1994	Luaka Bop/Warner Bros.	CD	45666
Worldwide	1995	Luaka Bop/Warner Bros.	CD	9362-45666
Worldwide	2006	Sire	CD	?
