= David Byrne Live at Union Chapel =

Live album by David Byrne
- Released: October 26, 2004
- Genre: Alternative rock
- Length: c. 87:00
- Label: Nonesuch; BBC; Warner
- Producer: Alison Howe; Marc Cooper (BBC series)

David Byrne chronology
Grown Backwards (2004)	David Byrne Live at Union Chapel (2004)	Everything That Happens Will Happen Today (2008)

Professional ratings
Review scores
Source	Rating
AllMusic	4/5 stars

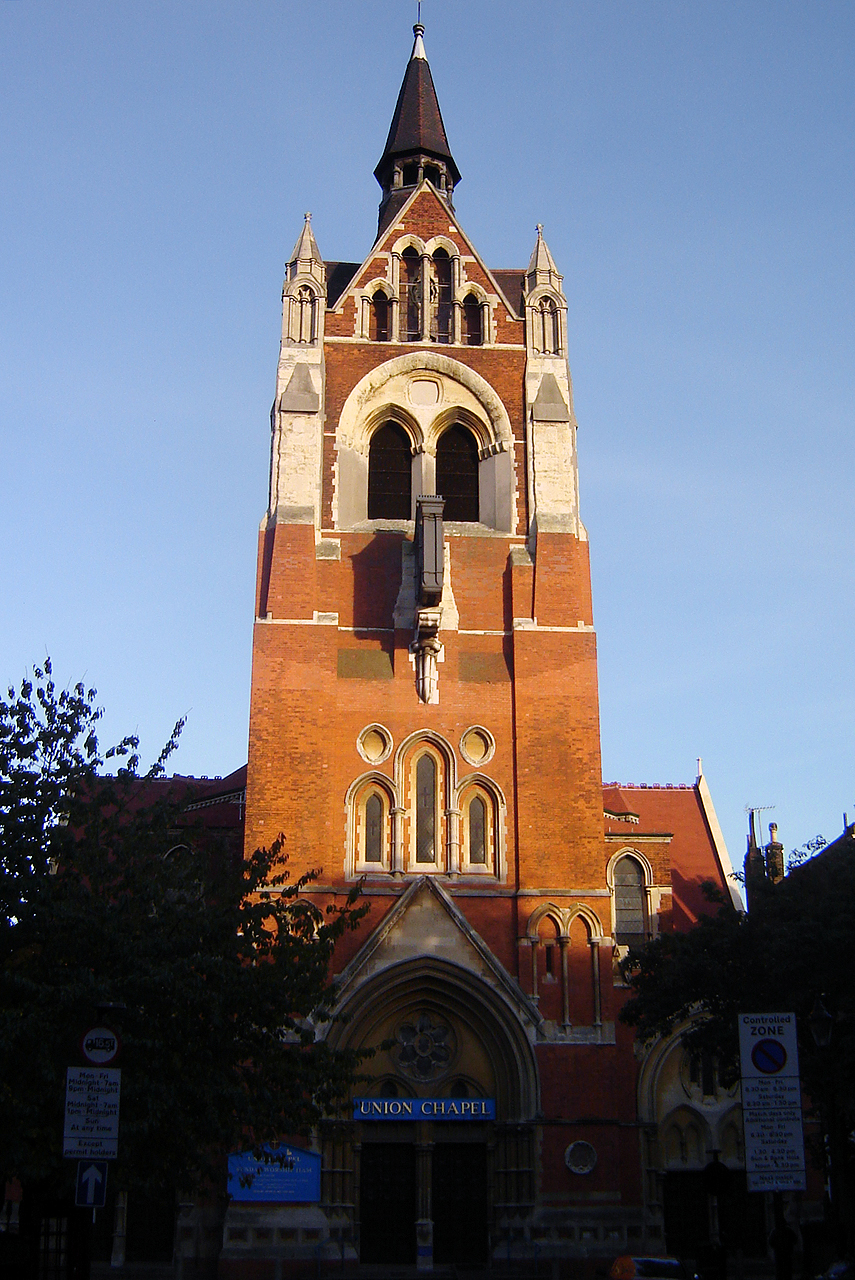
Union Chapel in Islington is a fully functional church and music venue

David Byrne Live at Union Chapel is a DVD of a live performance at Union Chapel, Islington by American musician David Byrne, released on October 26, 2004.

== Track listing ==
All songs written by David Byrne, except where noted:

1. "(Nothing But) Flowers" (Byrne, Chris Frantz, Jerry Harrison, Tina Weymouth)
2. "And She Was"
3. "Once in a Lifetime" (Byrne, Brian Eno, Frantz, Harrison, Weymouth)
4. "God's Child"
5. "The Great Intoxication"
6. "Un di felice" (Giuseppe Verdi)
7. "The Revolution"
8. "Sax and Violins" (Byrne, Frantz, Harrison, Weymouth)
9. "This Must Be the Place (Naive Melody)" (Byrne, Frantz, Harrison, Weymouth)
10. "What a Day That Was"
11. "Like Humans Do"
12. "U.B. Jesus"
13. "Life During Wartime" (Byrne, Frantz, Harrison, Weymouth)
14. "Lazy" (Byrne, X-Press 2)
15. "I Wanna Dance with Somebody (Who Loves Me)" (George Merrill, Shannon Rubicam)
16. "Ausencia" (Goran Bregović, Teofilo Chantre)
17. "The Accident"
18. "Road to Nowhere" (Byrne, Frantz, Harrison, Weymouth)

== Personnel ==
- David Byrne – vocals, guitar
- Paul Frazier – bass
- David Hilliard – drums
- Mauro Refosco – percussion
- The Tosca Strings:
  - Jamie Desautels – violin
  - Tracy Seeger – violin
  - Leigh Mahoney – violin
  - Ames Asbell – viola
  - Doug Harvey – cello
  - Sara Nelson – cello

== Release history ==
Region	Date	Label	Format	Catalog
Worldwide	October 26, 2004	Nonesuch	DVD	
