= Big Love: Hymnal =

Soundtrack album by David Byrne
- Released: August 19, 2008
- Recorded: 2008
- Studio: Kampo (New York City)
- Genre: Hymn; soundtrack
- Length: 40:20
- Label: Todo Mundo; HBO; Play Tone
- Producer: David Byrne

David Byrne chronology
Everything That Happens Will Happen Today (2008)	Big Love: Hymnal (2008)	Everything That Happens Will Happen on This Tour – David Byrne on Tour: Songs of David Byrne and Brian Eno (2009)

Big Love: Hymnal – Music Written for the HBO Series Plus Other Recent Compositions is a soundtrack album by American musician David Byrne including music composed for the HBO television drama Big Love released on August 19, 2008. Byrne has written on his journal that it is not "a pop record by any stretch," but a soundtrack featuring lush instrumentation, including horns and strings, with minimal percussion. The album features instrumentals with the exception of the final track, a cover of "Blue Hawaii", which is originally from 1937. It is the first release by Byrne's independent record label Todo Mundo, although Everything That Happens Will Happen Today was released in digital format one day prior to Big Love: Hymnal.

== Composition ==
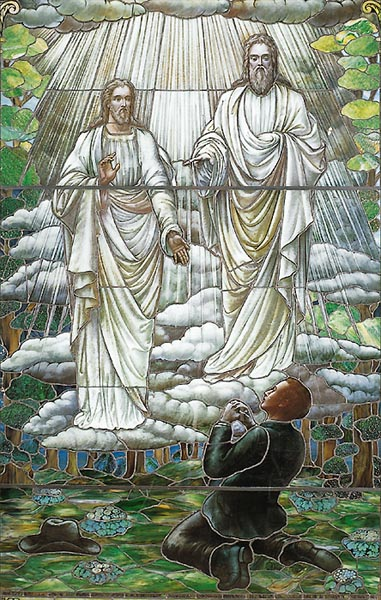
Byrne was inspired by Mormon folk culture and art, such as this stained glass representation of Joseph Smith's first visitation

Byrne initially started writing music for the series in fall, 2006. He found himself attracted to the moral fascination of Big Love and identified with the characters in the series and decided to compose half a dozen hymns that would "imply that [the characters are] always aware of the religious underpinnings that they see as supporting their lifestyle and how they behave." To that end, he sought out Mormon hymnals, recordings of sacred music, and read up on the history of Mormonism. He was also inspired by the soundtrack work of Bernard Herrmann and Nino Rota. He visited the Los Angeles set of the series in early 2007 to talk with the producers about the second season's arc and returned to New York City to continue composing and recording based on what he had seen and the video the producers sent him. The episodes themselves aired from June through August that year and Byrne continued scoring and uploading his music via FTP, finishing on August 3, 2007. In preparing to release the album the following year, Byrne expanded some musical cues and added several hymns that were not included in the series itself.

== Critical reception ==
Professional ratings
Review scores
Source	Rating
AllMusic	3/5 stars
The Independent	4/5 stars
Los Angeles Times	3/4 stars
Tiny Mix Tapes	4/5 stars

The album has received overall positive reviews. Reviewers have found the album too esoteric, such as Chris Barrett, writing for the Metro Pulse, who concludes his review writing "Recommended. But, as mentioned, probably not for everybody." Thom Jurek of AllMusic gave the album three out of five stars, calling it "pleasant for a while, but lightweight" noting that buyers would have to be "Byrne enthusiast[s]... to find this set of compositions engaging in its own right, or addicted to very specifically themed cinematically inspired music, to truly appreciate what's on offer here." Some reviewers have noted the emotional sweep of the music, with John Constine of Tiny Mix Tapes calling it "a wide breadth of emotions... at times pensive and ominous, at others curious and wistful." In addition, the spiritual themes have been compared to Sufjan Stevens by several commentators as well as Byrne's other 2008 album, the Brian Eno collaboration Everything That Happens Will Happen Today.

== Track listing ==
All songs written by David Byrne, except "Blue Hawaii" by Leo Robin and Ralph Rainger.

1. "Art Thou Greater Than He?" – 2:04
2. "Exquisite Whiteness" – 2:04
3. "A Hill in Ontario County" – 1:25
4. "Written on Golden Plates" – 2:12
5. "Deep Water" – 2:06
6. "A Building in the Air" – 1:14
7. "Great Desolations" – 2:36
8. "A House on Sand" – 3:13
9. "The Mouth of Malachi" – 1:38
10. "Cumorah!" – 1:14
11. "The Angel Moroni" – 1:56
12. "Murmur Not" – 1:14
13. "The Pearl of Great Price" – 1:25
14. "Language Confounded" – 2:12
15. "Unclean Spirits" – 2:13
16. "A Persecution Followed" – 2:01
17. "The Breastplate of Righteousness" – 1:32
18. "A Conduit to Heaven" – 2:37
19. "A Cloud of Light" – 1:25
20. "The Burden of the Word" – 2:34
21. "Blue Hawaii" – 1:25

== Personnel ==
- David Byrne – composition, arrangement, production, guitar, vocals, engineering, mixing, and art design
- Cyrus Beroukhim – viola
- Greg Calbi – mastering
- Patrick Dillett – engineering and mixing
- Kenn Finn – baritone horn
- Tony Finno – arrangement on tracks 1, 2, 4, 11, 13, 17, 18 and 20
- Pauline Kim – violin
- Amy Kimball – violin
- Theodore Primis – French horn
- Andre Ribuoli – cover art embroidery
- Ronald Shepard – flugelhorn
- Chad Yarbough – French horn
- Garo Yellin – cello
