= Music for "The Knee Plays" =

Album by David Byrne

Soundtrack album by David Byrne
- Released: May 1985
- Recorded: 1984
- Studios: One on One Studio and Studio Sound Recorders (North Hollywood)
- Length: 56:53
- Labels: ECM (Original US release); EMI/Regal Zonophone (Original international release); Nonesuch (2007 reissue)
- Producer: David Byrne

David Byrne chronology
| The Catherine Wheel (1981) | Music for "The Knee Plays" (1985) | Sounds from True Stories (1986) |

Music for "The Knee Plays" (1985) is an album by American musician David Byrne composed for Robert Wilson's opera the CIVIL warS. The album was released on vinyl; a remastered and expanded CD version was released in November 2007 under the title The Knee Plays and it includes eight previously unreleased bonus tracks and a DVD of the music set to a slideshow of 400 black and white photographs.

Professional ratings
Review scores
| Source | Rating |
|---|---|
| Robert Christgau | A− |

The Knee Plays

Soundtrack album by David Byrne
- Released: 6 November 2007
- Recorded: 1983 at JAK Recording Studio, Tokyo; 1984 at One on One Studio and Studio Sound Recorders, North Hollywood
- Length: 79:42
- Label: Nonesuch
- Producer: David Byrne

David Byrne chronology
| Live from Austin, Texas (2004) | The Knee Plays (2007) | Everything That Happens Will Happen Today (2008) |

Professional ratings
Review scores
| Source | Rating |
|---|---|
| AllMusic | 3/5 stars |
| The Guardian | 4/5 stars |
| Pitchfork Media | 7.5/10 |

== Track listing ==
All tracks written by David Byrne except where noted.

| No. | Title | Length |
|---|---|---|
| 1. | "Tree (Today Is An Important Occasion)" | 4:02 |
| 2. | "In the Upper Room" (Traditional, arranged by the Baptist Methodist Choir Church of God, Byrne & David Blumberg) | 3:35 |
| 3. | "The Sound of Business" | 6:15 |
| 4. | "Social Studies" | 4:52 |
| 5. | "(The Gift of Sound) Where the Sun Never Goes Down" (Trad., arr. Clara Hudman "The Georgia Peach", Byrne & Blumberg) | 2:34 |
| 6. | "Theadora is Dozing" (Trad, arr. Ensemble of the Bulgarian Republic, Byrne, Blumberg) | 2:59 |
| 7. | "Admiral Perry" | 5:32 |
| 8. | "I Bid You Goodnight" (Trad., arr the Pindar Family, Byrne & Blumberg) | 2:51 |
| 9. | "I've Tried" (Trad., arr Swan's Silvertone Singers, Byrne, Blumberg) | 3:24 |
| 10. | "Winter" | 6:11 |
| 11. | "Jungle Book" | 3:38 |
| 12. | "In the Future" | 6:35 |

2007 re-release bonus tracks
| No. | Title | Length |
|---|---|---|
| 13. | "Tree (Reprise)" | 2:36 |
| 14. | "(I've Tried) Things to Do" | 3:28 |
| 15. | "Tic Toc 2 (In the Future)" | 5:36 |
| 16. | "Whisper" | 3:17 |
| 17. | "Misterias" | 2:42 |
| 18. | "Faust Dance" | 2:18 |
| 19. | "Ghost" | 3:24 |
| 20. | "Super Natural" | 2:56 |

=== DVD track listing ===
| No. | Title | Length |
|---|---|---|
| 1. | "Tree (Today Is An Important Occasion)" | 4:07 |
| 2. | "In the Upper Room" | 3:40 |
| 3. | "The Sound of Business" | 6:20 |
| 4. | "Social Studies" | 4:59 |
| 5. | "(The Gift of Sound) Where the Sun Never Goes Down" | 2:37 |
| 6. | "Theadora is Dozing" | 3:04 |
| 7. | "Admiral Perry" | 5:32 |
| 8. | "I Bid You Goodnight" | 2:55 |
| 9. | "Things to Do (I've Tried)" | 3:27 |
| 10. | "Winter" | 6:26 |
| 11. | "Jungle Book" | 3:43 |
| 12. | "In the Future" | 6:35 |
| 13. | "Tree (Reprise)" | 2:36 |

== Personnel ==
- Garnett Brown - trombone
- Ray Brown - trumpet on tracks 1–5, 10–12
- David Byrne - vocals
- Pete Christlieb - saxophone on tracks 1–5, 10–12
- Rich Cooper - trumpet on tracks 1–5, 10–12
- Ernie Fields Jr. - baritone saxophone
- Chuck Findley - trumpet on tracks 1–4, 11
- Bill Green - baritone saxophone
- Bobbye Hall - percussion
- Dana Hughes - trombone
- Paul Humphrey - drums
- Jackie Kelso - saxophone on tracks 5–10, 12
- Harry Kim - trumpet on tracks 5–10, 12
- Don Myrick - saxophone on tracks 1–4, 11
- Nolan Smith - trumpet on tracks 1–5, 10–12
- David Stout - trombone
- Phil Teil - trombone
- Ernie Watts - saxophone on tracks 1–4, 11
- Fred Wesley - trombone

== Release history ==
| Region | Date | Label | Format | Catalog |
|---|---|---|---|---|
| Worldwide | 1985 | Regal Zonophone | LP | 2403811 |
| Worldwide | 1985 | ECM | LP | 25022 |
| Worldwide | 2007 | Nonesuch | CD | 303228 |
