= Feelings (David Byrne album) =

Studio album by David Byrne
- Released: June 17, 1997
- Genres: Art rock; alternative rock
- Length: 48:50
- Labels: Luaka Bop; Warner Bros.
- Producers: David Byrne; Black Cat Orchestra; Gerald Casale; Camus Celli; Joe Galdo; Lori Goldston; Andres Levin; Mark Mothersbaugh; Hahn Rowe; Mark Saunders; Morcheeba production (Paul Godfrey, Ross Godfrey, and Pete Norris)

David Byrne chronology
David Byrne (1994)	Feelings (1997)	The Visible Man (1998)

Singles from Feelings
- 1. "Dance On Vaseline" Released: 1996 (US and Europe); 2. "Miss America" Released: 1997

Professional ratings
Review scores
Source	Rating
AllMusic	3/5 stars
The New York Times	(favorable)
NME	7/10
Rolling Stone	(favorable)
Uncut	2/5 stars

Feelings is the fifth studio album by American musician David Byrne, released on June 17, 1997. The album is noted for Byrne's collaboration with the English electronic band Morcheeba.

The album's cover art was made by Stefan Sagmeister. The initial 50,000 copies of Feelings featured die-cut packaging.

== Track listing ==
All songs written by David Byrne and produced by Morcheeba Productions and Byrne, except where noted.

No.	Title	Producer(s)	Length
1.	"Fuzzy Freaky" (Byrne, Daniele Fossati, Cristiano De André)		4:59
2.	"Miss America" (Byrne, Joe Galdo)	Galdo, Byrne	4:20
3.	"A Soft Seduction"	Hahn Rowe, Byrne	3:01
4.	"Dance on Vaseline"		5:08
5.	"The Gates of Paradise"		3:31
6.	"Amnesia"		3:26
7.	"You Don't Know Me"	Mark Saunders, Byrne	2:30
8.	"Daddy Go Down"		4:07
9.	"Finite=Alright"	Andres Levin, Camus Celli, Byrne	2:24
10.	"Wicked Little Doll"	Mark Mothersbaugh, Gerald V. Casale, Byrne	2:55
11.	"Burnt by the Sun"		4:21
12.	"The Civil Wars"	Levin, Celli, Byrne	3:40
13.	Untitled		0:22
14.	"They Are in Love"	Lori Goldston, Black Cat Orchestra, Byrne	4:09
Total length:			48:50

== Personnel ==
=== Musicians ===
- Carlos Baptiste – violin
- Black Cat Orchestra – Lori Goldston, Russ Meltzer, Don Crevie, Scott Granlund, Kyle Hanson, Matthew Sperry, Joseph Zajonc, Ed Pias
- David Byrne – vocals, guitar, dobro, synthesizer, loops
- Ed Calle – saxophone
- Lester Mendez - Keyboards & Programming on "Miss America"
- Gerald Casale – bass and background vocals on "Wicked Little Doll"
- Greg Cohen – bass guitar
- Paula Cole – background vocals
- Sterling Campbell - drums
- Joe Galdo – drums, percussion
- Juliet Haffner – viola
- Nicholas Holland – cello
- Ashley D. Horne – violin
- Pierre La Roux – fiddle
- Morcheeba: Skye Edwards, Paul Godfrey, and Ross Godfrey
- Mark Mothersbaugh – synthesizer and samples on "Wicked Little Doll"
- Hahn Rowe – keyboards
- Mark Saunders – keyboards
- Dana Teboe – trombone
- Betty Wright – background vocals

=== Technicians ===
- Michael Daube & Adele Lutz – Doll clothing
- Kat Egan & Veronica Gonzales – Production coordination
- Ted Jensen – Mastering
- Stefan Sagmeister – Design
- Tom Schierlitz – Photography
- Yuji Yoshimoto – Model design and construction

== Release history ==
Region	Date	Label	Format	Catalog
Worldwide	1997	Luaka Bop/Warner Bros.	CD	46605
Worldwide	1997	Luaka Bop/Warner Bros.	Cassette tape	46605
