= How Music Works =

Book by David Byrne

- Author: David Byrne
- Language: English
- Subject: Memoir / music theory
- Published: September 12, 2012
- Publisher: McSweeney's
- Publication place: United States
- Pages: 352
- ISBN: 1936365537

How Music Works is a non-fiction book by David Byrne, an American musician, composer, and writer best known for his work with the group Talking Heads. He discusses the form and influence of music in a non-linear narrative fashion, using a variety of experiences from his career to create something part autobiography and part music theory. The book was published through McSweeney's on September 12, 2012, and was named as one of Amazon.com's "Best Books of the Month" in that same month. It has received mainly positive reviews.

== Contents ==
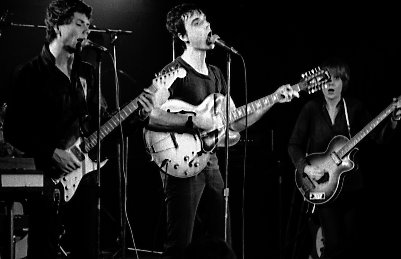
Talking Heads performing at Horseshoe Tavern in Toronto in 1978.

The book, despite being non-fiction, has a highly non-linear structure with manual-like information, elements of Byrne's autobiography, and anthropological data on music theory all intermixed, each chapter able to stand alone. Byrne looks at the influence of music, even in such subtle forms as birdsongs, from a rational perspective that eschews romanticism. Overall, he writes that no music "is aimed exclusively at either the body or the head", with complex human beings interacting with it on different levels.

He discusses his career with Talking Heads, detailing many points of background for their music. He describes how the lyrics to the 1980 song "Once in a Lifetime" drew inspiration from a recording of a preacher, as well as how the oversize suits worn in their concert film Stop Making Sense drew inspiration from ancient Japanese theatre. Byrne avoids bringing back up the personality conflicts leading to the band's demise, and he instead goes through their history, album by album, to detail his views on performances versus recordings as well as the effects of money and fame. In particular, he spends a chapter on the CBGB nightclub and the underlying conditions that supported the development of new, avant-garde artists such as Patti Smith, the Ramones, Blondie, and others besides his own band.

Byrne writes,

"I’ve made money, and I’ve been ripped off... I’ve had creative freedom, and I’ve been pressured to make hits. I have dealt with diva behavior from crazy musicians, and I have seen genius records by wonderful artists get completely ignored... If you think success in the world of music is determined by the number of records sold, or the size of your house or bank account, then I’m not the expert for you. I am more interested in how people can manage a whole lifetime in music."

In 2017, a revised edition of the book was reprinted on Three Rivers Press with an additional chapter on the digital curation of music.

== Reception ==
A supportive review ran in The Daily Telegraph, with Oliver Keens stating that "David Byrne deserves great praise". Keens referred to the book as "as accessible as pop yet able to posit deep and startlingly original thoughts and discoveries in almost every paragraph", and he added that "this book will make you hear music differently." He remarked as well that "Talking Heads fans will find much to savour", and that "Byrne shows not just how music works, but how music publishing should work too."

The A.V. Club also published a positive review. Critic Jason Heller remarked that "joy—of singing and playing, of thinking and dancing, of listening and wondering—renders almost every page a song." In addition, he wrote, "Byrne’s knack for paradox and passion carries his erratic narrative."

The Washington Post critic Tim Page commented, "This is a decidedly generous book—welcoming, informal, digressive, full of ideas and intelligence—and one has the pleasant sense that Byrne is speaking directly to the reader, sharing a few confidences he has picked up over the years." Stating that "Byrne has plenty of smart things to say about pop music", Page lauded the "ambitious" work. Kirkus Reviews praised the book as "a supremely intelligent, superbly written dissection of music as an art form and way of life." The magazine stated in addition that "anyone at all interested in music will learn a lot from this book."

On the other hand, for The New York Times critic Dwight Garner, the book is "a roll of mental wallpaper, a textbook for a survey course you didn’t mean to sign up for. It drifts between music history, sonic anthropology, mild biographical asides, broad pop theory and grandfatherly financial and artistic advice. It’s all the things Mr. Byrne’s twitchy and alienated music with Talking Heads never was: genial, well-meaning, as forgettable as a real estate agent’s handshake."

== See also ==
- 2012 in literature
- Music theory
- Talking Heads
