= And She Was =

1985 single by Talking Heads

Single by Talking Heads

from the album Little Creatures
- Released: September 1985
- Studio: Sigma Sound (New York City)
- Length: 3:36 (album version); 3:26 (single mix)
- Label: Sire; EMI
- Songwriter: David Byrne
- Producer: Talking Heads

Talking Heads singles chronology
"Road to Nowhere" (1985)	"And She Was" (1985)	"Once in a Lifetime" (live) (1986)

Music video
- "And She Was" on YouTube

"And She Was" is a song by the American rock band Talking Heads from their sixth studio album Little Creatures (1985). The song was written by David Byrne, who also provides the lead vocals. It reached No. 54 on the U.S. Billboard Hot 100 and No. 17 on the UK singles chart. The accompanying music video was directed by avant-garde filmmaker Jim Blashfield, who cites the style of Terry Gilliam as one of his major influences.

== Background ==
"I used to know a blissed-out hippie-chick in Baltimore," recalled Byrne in the liner notes of Once in a Lifetime: The Best of Talking Heads (1992). "She once told me that she used to do acid (the drug, not music) and lay down on the field by the Yoo-hoo chocolate soda factory. Flying out of her body, etc etc. It seemed like such a tacky kind of transcendence… but it was real! A new kind of religion being born out of heaps of rusted cars and fast food joints. And this girl was flying above it all, but in it too."

Talking Heads' drummer Chris Frantz said of the song, "It's a story about a woman who has the power to levitate above the ground and to check out all her neighbors from a kind of bird's eye view. And the guy who's writing the song is in love with her and he kinda wishes she would just be more normal and, like, come on back down to the ground [Laughs], but she doesn't. She goes floating over the backyard and past the buildings and the schools and stuff and is absolutely [upside-down] to him in every way." This theme was also featured in the stop motion music video for the song.

== Critical reception ==
Cashbox said that the song "displays David Byrne's discreet pop ingenuity and Talking Heads' inimitable rhythmic pump" and has "a strangely surrealistic lyric and a singalong chorus." John Leland at Spin praised the extended mix, saying, "Talking Heads overhaul the already brilliant "And She Was" and turn it into the vibrantly upbeat pop party record the B-52s have spent a lifetime trying to make."

== Charts ==
=== Weekly charts ===
Weekly chart performance for "And She Was"
Chart (1985–1986)	Peak position
Australia (Kent Music Report)	10
Belgium (Ultratop 50 Flanders)	23
Europe (European Hot 100 Singles)	13
Ireland (IRMA)	9
Netherlands (Dutch Top 40)	25
Netherlands (Single Top 100)	31
New Zealand (Recorded Music NZ)	16
UK Singles (Official Charts)	17
US Billboard Hot 100	54
US Dance Club Songs (Billboard) Remix with "Television Man" (remix)	33
US Dance Singles Sales (Billboard) Remix with "Television Man" (remix)	38
US Mainstream Rock Airplay (Billboard)	11
West Germany (GfK)	53

=== Year-end charts ===
Year-end chart performance for "And She Was"
Chart (1986)	Position
Australia (Kent Music Report)	90

== Personnel ==
Talking Heads

- David Byrne - vocals, guitars
- Jerry Harrison - keyboards, guitars, piano, backing vocals
- Tina Weymouth - bass guitar, backing vocals
- Chris Frantz - drums

additional musicians

- Gordon Grody – backing vocals
- Lani Groves – backing vocals
- Kurt Yahjian – backing vocals
- Lenny Pickett - saxophone
- Steve Scales – percussion

== Certifications ==
Region	Certification	Certified units/sales
New Zealand (RMNZ)	Platinum	30,000^{‡}
^{‡} Sales+streaming figures based on certification alone.
