= Look into the Eyeball =

Studio album by David Byrne
- Released: May 8, 2001
- Studios: The Cutting Room Studio and Sound on Sound Studio (New York City)
- Genres: Art rock; alternative rock; folk rock; worldbeat
- Length: 38:46
- Label: Virgin
- Producer: Michael Mangini

David Byrne chronology
In Spite of Wishing and Wanting (1999)	Look into the Eyeball (2001)	Lead Us Not into Temptation (2003)

Singles from Look into the Eyeball
- 1. "Like Humans Do" Released: September 18, 2001; 2. "U.B. Jesus" Released: 2001; 3. "Desconocido Soy" Released: 2001 (Europe and Spain)

Professional ratings
Aggregate scores
Source	Rating
Metacritic	68/100
Review scores
Source	Rating
AllMusic	3/5 stars
Alternative Press	2/5 stars
Blender	3/5 stars
Dotmusic	3/5 stars
Entertainment Weekly	A−
The Guardian	4/5 stars
Mojo	4.5/5 stars
Now	3/5 stars
Pitchfork	8.0/10
Uncut	7/10

Look into the Eyeball is the sixth studio album by American musician David Byrne, released on May 8, 2001 by Virgin Records. The single "Like Humans Do" was supplied with the Windows XP operating system to showcase version 8 of Microsoft's Windows Media Player.

"Desconocido Soy" is a Spanish-language song, performed with Nrü (a.k.a. Rubén Albarrán) from Café Tacuba. The title means "I Am Unknown" in English.

As of August 2001 the album has sold 63,000 copies in United States according to Nielsen SoundScan.

== Track listing ==
All songs written and arranged by David Byrne

No.	Title	Length
1.	"U.B. Jesus"	3:49
2.	"The Revolution"	2:15
3.	"The Great Intoxication"	2:36
4.	"Like Humans Do"	3:32
5.	"Broken Things"	4:29
6.	"The Accident"	2:34
7.	"Desconocido Soy"	2:38
8.	"Neighborhood"	4:32
9.	"Smile"	3:33
10.	"The Moment of Conception"	2:55
11.	"Walk on Water"	3:26
12.	"Everyone's in Love with You"	2:27

Special edition bonus tracks
No.	Title	Length
13.	"All Over Me"	5:18
14.	"Princess"	3:56

== Personnel ==
- David Byrne – vocals and guitar, keyboards on "Walk on the Water", Mellotron on "Everyone's in Love with You", and timpani on "The Accident"

Additional musicians

- Thom Bell – Rhodes on "Neighborhood"
- Herb Besson – trombone
- Virgil Blackwell – clarinet on "Smile"
- Kysia Bostic – back-up vocals
- Paulo Braga – percussion on "The Great Intoxication"
- Vinicius Cantuária – percussion on "The Great Intoxication"
- Bob Carlisle – French horn
- Tara Chambers – cello
- Vivian Cherry – back-up vocals
- Greg Cohen – upright bass
- Imani Coppola – back-up vocals on "Everyone's in Love with You"
- Nick Cords – viola
- Michael Davis – trombone
- Larry Etkin – flugelhorn and trumpet on "Broken Things"
- Bruno Eicher – violin
- Arlen Fast – bassoon on "The Accident""
- Paul Frazier – bass guitar
- Robert Funk – trombone on "Broken Things"
- Karen Griffin – piccolo
- Dawn Hannay – viola
- Jim Hayes – trumpet on "Like Humans Do"
- Birch Johnson – trombone on "Broken Things"
- Bradley Jones – bass on "The Revolution", baby bass on "Everyone's in Love with You"
- Rodd Kadleck – trumpet
- Vivek Kamath – viola
- Lisa Kim – violin
- Judy Leclair – bassoon on "The Accident""
- Ken Lewis – bass and keyboards
- Eileen Moon – cello
- Kristina Mosso – violin
- Maxim Moston – violin
- Nrü (a.k.a. Rubén Isaac Albarrán Ortega) – vocals on "Desconocido Soy"
- Suzanne Ornstein – violin
- Sandra Park – violin
- Rajnhidur Pejursdottir – violin
- Shawn Pelton – drum kit and percussion
- Susan Pray – viola
- Dan Reed – violin
- Mauro Refosco – percussion
- Robert Rinehart – viola
- Stewart Rose – French horn
- Roger Rosenberg – baritone saxophone
- Marlon Saunders – back-up vocals
- Laura Seaton – violin
- Sarah Seiver – cello
- Fiona Simon – violin
- Alan Stepansky – cello
- John Vercesi – Rhodes on "The Revolution"
- Shelley Woodworth – English horn on "The Great Intoxication"
- Sharon Yamada – violin

Production

- David Byrne – photography
- Greg Calbi – mastering
- Danny Clinch – photography
- Stephen Doyle – photography
- Ken Lewis – engineering, mixing (tracks 2 to 12)
- Michael Mangini – producer
- Doyle Partners – artwork

== Release history ==
Region	Date	Label	Format	Catalog
Worldwide	2001-05-08	Virgin	CD	50924
