= David Byrne =

American musician (born 1952)

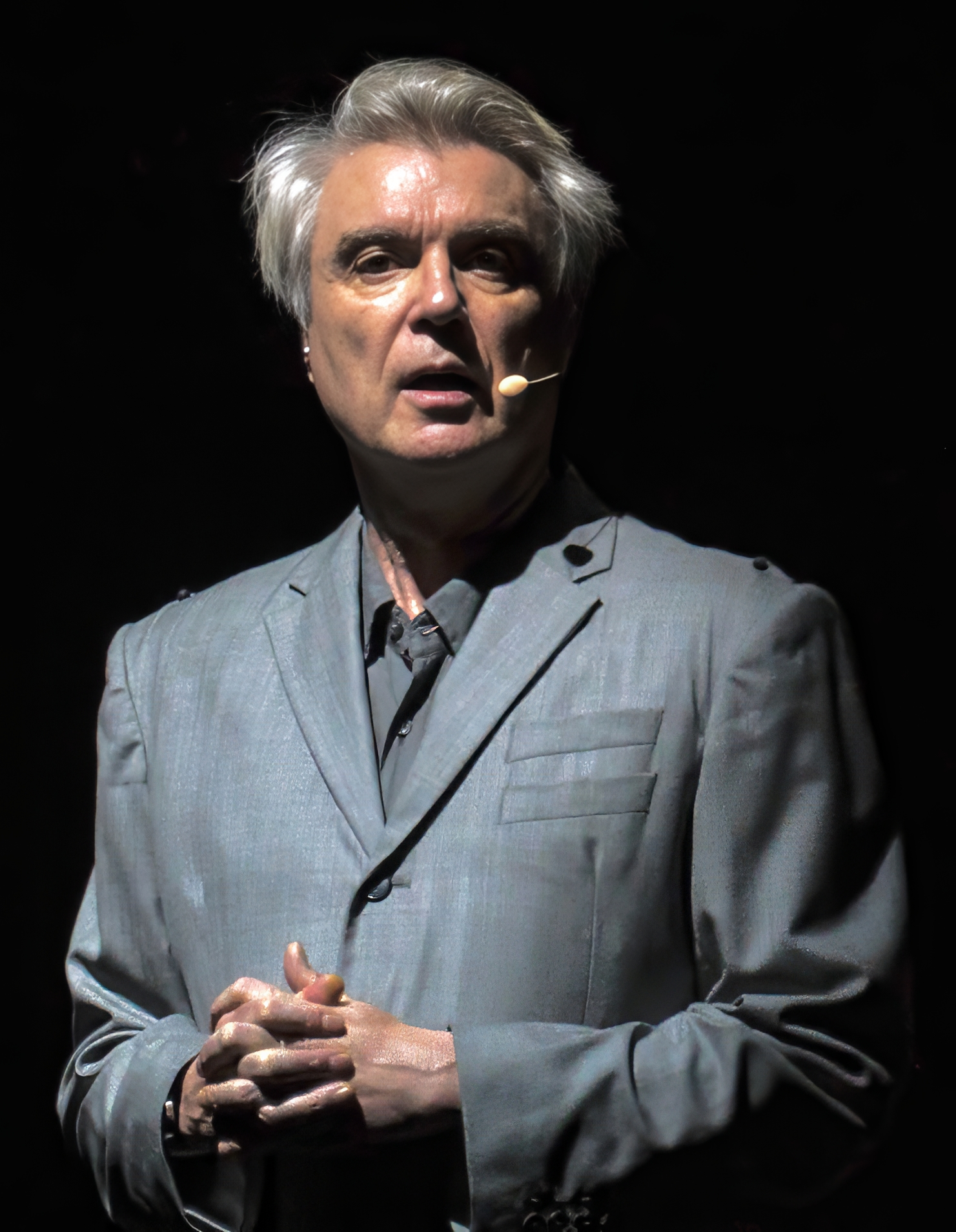
- Byrne in 2018
- Born: May 14, 1952 (age 74); Dumbarton, Scotland
- Citizenship: United Kingdom; United States; Ireland
- Occupations: Singer; songwriter; musician; record producer; music theorist; visual artist; actor; writer; filmmaker
- Years active: 1971–present
- Spouses: Adelle Lutz (m. 1987; div. 2004) Mala Gaonkar (m. 2025)
- Children: 1
- Musical career
- Origin: Arbutus, Maryland, U.S.
- Genres: Rock; new wave; post-punk; avant-funk; art pop; worldbeat
- Instruments: Vocals; guitar; keyboards
- Works: Solo; with Talking Heads
- Labels: Matador; Todo Mundo; Luaka Bop; Nonesuch; Thrill Jockey; Sire; Warner Bros.
- Formerly of: Talking Heads
- Website: davidbyrne.com

David Byrne (/bɜːrn/; born May 14, 1952) is an American musician, writer, visual artist, and filmmaker. He was a founding member and the principal songwriter, lead vocalist, and guitarist of the rock band Talking Heads.

Byrne was born in Dumbarton, Scotland, and moved to the United States with his family as a child. He co-founded Talking Heads in 1975 in New York City. After releasing eight studio albums, including seven certified gold or platinum, Talking Heads disbanded in 1991. He made his directorial debut with True Stories (1986).

Byrne has released solo recordings and worked with media including film, photography, opera, fiction, and non-fiction. He has collaborated with artists including Brian Eno, Fatboy Slim, X-Press 2, Ryuichi Sakamoto of Yellow Magic Orchestra, and St. Vincent. Byrne has received an Academy Award, a Grammy Award, a Special Tony Award, and a Golden Globe Award, and was inducted to the Rock and Roll Hall of Fame as part of Talking Heads.

== Early life and education ==
David Byrne was born on May 14, 1952, in Dumbarton, Dunbartonshire, Scotland. Two years after his birth, the family moved to Canada, settling in Hamilton, Ontario. When Byrne was eight or nine years old they moved to Arbutus Maryland, where his father worked as an electronics engineer at Westinghouse Electric Corporation and his mother later became a teacher. Byrne grew up speaking with a Scottish accent but adopted an American one to fit in at school. His father was an amateur painter.

From a young age, Byrne had a strong interest in music. His parents said that he would constantly play his phonograph from age three and he learned how to play the harmonica at age five. He was rejected from his middle school's choir because he was "off-key and too withdrawn". A formative song was the Byrds's cover of Bob Dylan's "Mr. Tambourine Man": "From the opening sound, I thought, 'Wow, this is really different.'" By high school, Byrne knew how to play the guitar, accordion, and violin. His father used his electronic engineering skills to modify a reel-to-reel tape recorder so that Byrne could make multitrack recordings.

Byrne graduated from Lansdowne High School in southwest Baltimore County, Maryland. He attended the Rhode Island School of Design (RISD) in Providence, Rhode Island, during the 1970–71 term and the Maryland Institute College of Art in Baltimore during the 1971–72 term before dropping out. He was told not to return to his high school choir.

== Career ==
=== Early career: 1971–1974 ===
Byrne started his musical career in a high school band called Revelation. Between 1971 and 1972, he was one half of a duo named Bizadi with Marc Kehoe. Their repertoire consisted mostly of songs such as "April Showers", "96 Tears", "Dancing on the Ceiling" and Frank Sinatra songs. He returned to Providence in 1973 and formed a band called the Artistics with fellow RISD student Chris Frantz. The band dissolved in 1974. Byrne moved to New York City in May that year, and in September of that year, Frantz and his girlfriend Tina Weymouth followed suit. After Byrne and Frantz were unable to find a bass guitar player in New York for nearly two years, Weymouth learned to play the instrument. While working day jobs in late 1974, they were contemplating a band.

=== Talking Heads: 1975–1991 ===
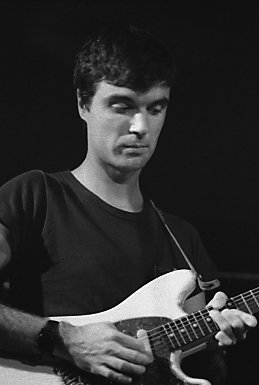
Byrne performing with Talking Heads at the Horseshoe Tavern in Toronto, Canada, 1978

By January 1975, Talking Heads were practicing and playing together, while working normal day jobs. They played their first gig in June at CBGB, opening for the Ramones.

In May 1976, Byrne quit his day job, and the three-piece band signed to Sire Records in November of that year. Byrne was the youngest member of the band. Multi-instrumentalist Jerry Harrison, previously of the Modern Lovers, joined the band in 1977. The band released eight studio albums to acclaim and commercial success. Four albums achieved gold status (exceeding 500,000 in sales) and two others were certified double-platinum (exceeding two million in sales). Talking Heads were pioneers of the new wave music scene in the late 1970s and early 1980s with popular and creative music videos in regular rotation on MTV.

In 1988 the band went on hiatus during which Byrne launched a solo career and the other members pursued their own projects. Talking Heads reunited in 1991 to record the single "Sax and Violins" and officially broke up in December 1991. In 2002, Talking Heads was inducted into the Rock and Roll Hall of Fame, where they reunited to play four tracks: "Psycho Killer", "Burning Down the House", "Life During Wartime", and their cover version of Al Green's 1974 song "Take Me to the River".

=== Solo album career: 1979–1981, 1989–present ===
During his time in the band, Byrne took on outside projects, collaborating with Brian Eno during 1979 and 1981 on the studio album My Life in the Bush of Ghosts, which attracted acclaim for its early use of sampling and found sounds. Following this record, Byrne focused his attention on Talking Heads. My Life in the Bush of Ghosts was re-released for its 25th anniversary in early 2006, with new bonus tracks. In keeping with the spirit of the original album, stems for two of the songs' component tracks were released under Creative Commons licenses and a remix contest website was launched.

Rei Momo (1989) was the second solo studio album by Byrne (the first after leaving Talking Heads), and features mainly Afro-Cuban, Afro-Hispanic, and Brazilian song styles, including popular dances such as merengue, son cubano, samba, mambo, cumbia, cha-cha-chá, bomba and charanga. His third solo studio album, Uh-Oh (1992), featured a brass section and was driven by tracks such as "Girls On My Mind" and "The Cowboy Mambo (Hey Lookit Me Now)". His fourth solo studio album, David Byrne (1994), was a more proper rock record, with Byrne playing most of the instruments, leaving percussion for session musicians. "Angels" and "Back in the Box" were the two main singles released from the album. The first one entered the U.S. Modern Rock Tracks chart, reaching No. 24. For his fifth studio effort, the emotional Feelings (1997), Byrne employed a brass orchestra called Black Cat Orchestra. His sixth, Look into the Eyeball (2001), continued the same musical exploration of Feelings, but was compiled of more upbeat tracks, like those found on Uh-Oh. The album cover and packaging for Feelings was designed by Stefan Sagmeister.

Grown Backwards (2004), released by Nonesuch Records, used orchestral string arrangements, and includes two operatic arias as well as a rework of X-Press 2 collaboration "Lazy". He also launched a North American and Australian tour with the Tosca Strings. This tour ended with Los Angeles, San Diego and New York shows in August 2005. He also collaborated with Selena on her fifth and final studio album Dreaming of You (1995), with "God's Child (Baila Conmigo)".

Byrne and Eno reunited for their second collaborative studio album Everything That Happens Will Happen Today (2008). He assembled a band to tour worldwide for the album for a six-month period from late 2008 through early 2009 on the Songs of David Byrne and Brian Eno Tour. In 2012, he released a collaborative album with American singer-songwriter St. Vincent called Love This Giant. The album featured both Byrne and St. Vincent on vocals and guitar, backed by a brass section. To promote the album, both artists travelled throughout North America, Europe, and Australia on the Love This Giant Tour in 2012 and 2013, with each performing pieces from their career in the album's distinctive brass band style alongside those composed for the album.

In January 2018, Byrne announced his first solo studio album in fourteen years. American Utopia was released in March through Todo Mundo and Nonesuch Records. He also released the album's first single, "Everybody's Coming to My House", which he co-wrote with Eno. The subsequent tour – which showcased songs from American Utopia alongside highlights from his Talking Heads and solo career to date – was described by NME as being perhaps "the most ambitious and impressive live show of all time", blurring the lines "between gig and theatre, poetry and dance".

In June 2025, Byrne released a new lead single "Everybody Laughs" and announced his next solo album Who Is the Sky?, with all songs being arranged by Ghost Train Orchestra. The album was released the following September via Matador, with the Who Is the Sky? Tour starting the same month. The album also features St. Vincent, Hayley Williams of Paramore, and Tom Skinner of the Smile.

=== Work in theatre, film, and television: 1981–present ===
In 1981, Byrne partnered with choreographer Twyla Tharp, scoring music he wrote that appeared on his album The Catherine Wheel for a ballet with the same name, prominently featuring unusual rhythms and lyrics. Productions of The Catherine Wheel appeared on Broadway that same year. He was chiefly responsible for the stage design and choreography of the concert film Stop Making Sense (1984), which was re-released in theatres by A24 in 2023. Byrne wrote the Dirty Dozen Brass Band-inspired score Music for "The Knee Plays", released in 1985, for Robert Wilson's vast five-act opera The Civil Wars: A Tree Is Best Measured When It Is Down.

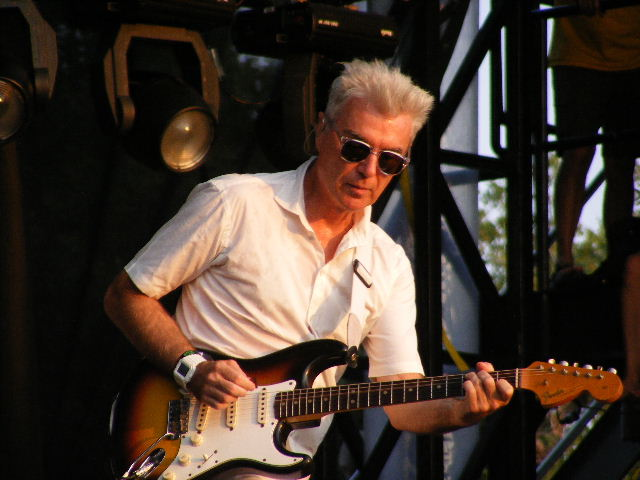
Byrne performing at Austin City Limits in Austin, Texas, 2008

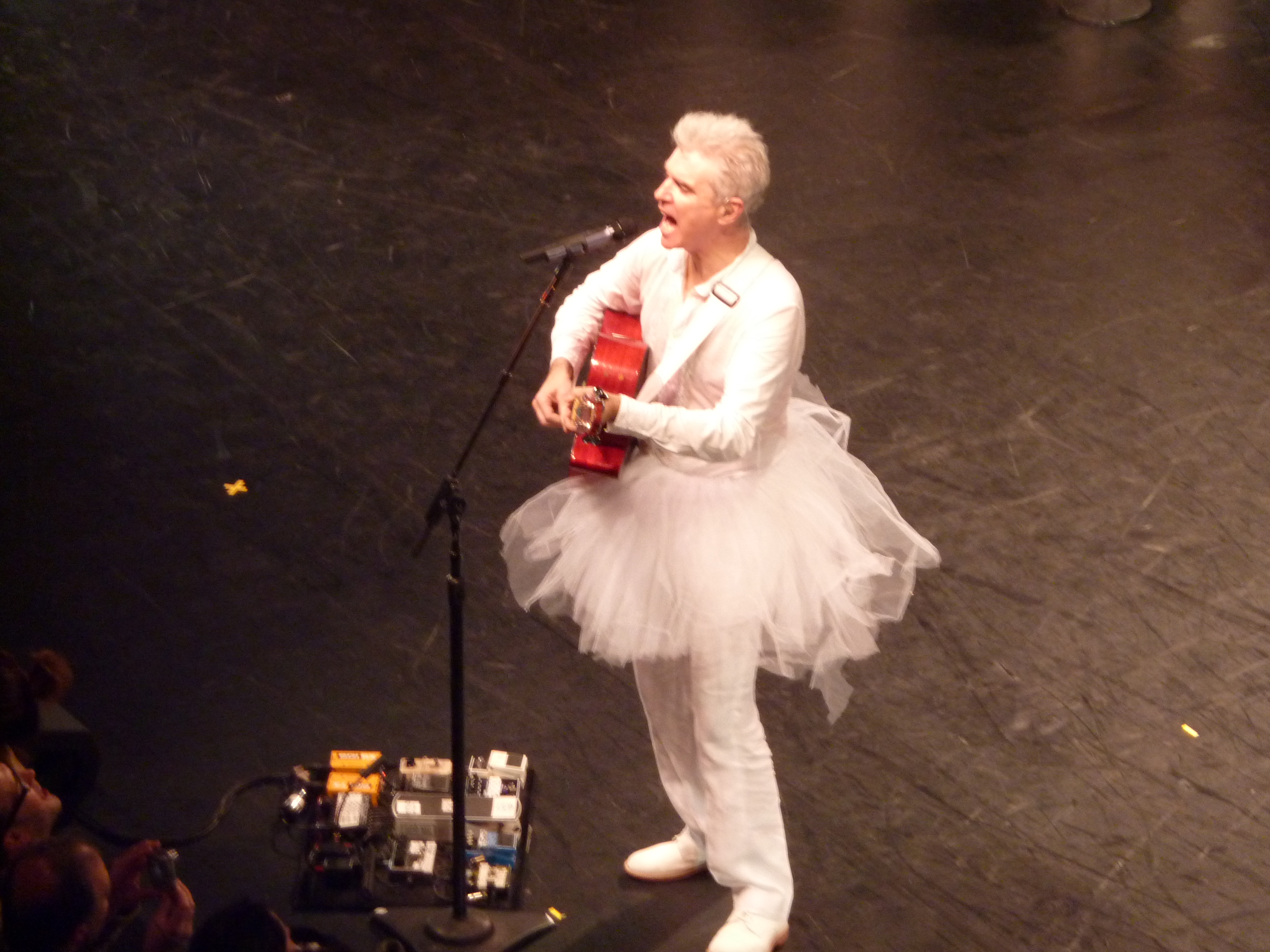
Byrne at the Royal Festival Hall in London, England, 2009

Byrne wrote, directed, and starred in True Stories (1986), a musical collage of discordant Americana for which he also produced most of the film's music. He was impressed by the experimental theatre that he saw in New York City in the 1970s and collaborated with several of its best-known representatives. He worked with Robert Wilson on "The Knee Plays" and "The Forest", and invited Spalding Gray of the Wooster Group to act in True Stories, while Meredith Monk provided a portion of the film's soundtrack. Byrne also provided a soundtrack for JoAnne Akalaitis' film Dead End Kids (1986), made after a Mabou Mines theatre production. Byrne's artistic outlook has a great deal in common with the work of these artists. The same year he also added "Loco de Amor" with Celia Cruz to Jonathan Demme's film Something Wild (1986).

His work has been extensively used in film soundtracks, most notably in collaboration with Ryuichi Sakamoto and Cong Su on Bernardo Bertolucci's The Last Emperor (1987), which won an Academy Award for Best Original Score. Some of the music from Byrne's orchestral album The Forest was originally used in a Robert Wilson–directed theatre piece titled The Forest. The play premiered at the Theater der Freien Volksbühne, Berlin, in 1988. It received its New York premiere in December 1988 at the Brooklyn Academy of Music (BAM). The "Forestry" maxi single contained dance and industrial remixes of pieces from The Forest by Jack Dangers, Rudy Tambala, and Anthony Capel. Byrne released his soundtrack album in 1991. Byrne also directed the documentary Île Aiye (1989) and the concert film of his 1992 Latin-tinged tour titled Between the Teeth (1994).

In Spite of Wishing and Wanting is a soundscape Byrne produced in 1999 for Belgian choreographer Wim Vandekeybus's dance company Ultima Vez. In 2003, Byrne guest starred as himself on a season 14 episode of the animated sitcom, The Simpsons. Released the same year, Lead Us Not into Temptation included tracks and musical experiments from his score to film Young Adam (2003). In late 2005, Byrne and Fatboy Slim began work on Here Lies Love, a disco opera or song cycle about the life of Imelda Marcos, the controversial former First Lady of the Philippines. Some music from this piece was debuted at the Adelaide Festival in Australia in February 2006 and the following year at Carnegie Hall in Manhattan on February 3, 2007.

In 2008, Byrne released Big Love: Hymnal – his soundtrack to season two of Big Love, which aired in 2007. These two albums constituted the first releases on his independent record label Todo Mundo. Byrne and Brian Eno provided the soundtrack for the film Wall Street: Money Never Sleeps (2010). In 2015, he organized Contemporary Color, two arena concerts in Brooklyn and Toronto, for which he brought in ten musical acts who teamed up with ten color guard groups. The concerts were made into a 2016 documentary film, directed by the Ross brothers, and produced by Byrne. He collaborated with businesswoman Mala Gaonkar in 2016 to co-create Neurosociety, a guided immersive theater performance.

In October 2019, his American Utopia opened at the Hudson Theatre on Broadway. Byrne appeared in comedian John Mulaney's children's musical comedy special John Mulaney & the Sack Lunch Bunch (2019), where he performed the song "Pay Attention!" His song "Tiny Apocalypse" was also featured as the special's end credits song. On February 29, 2020, after a 30-year absence, Byrne performed as the musical guest on Saturday Night Live (SNL) with John Mulaney as host. Byrne performed "Once in a Lifetime" and "Toe Jam" with the cast of the Broadway show American Utopia and appears in the "Airport Sushi" sketch singing a parody of "Road to Nowhere". This was Byrne's third appearance on Saturday Night Live. He previously served as the musical guest as part of Talking Heads in 1979, and as a solo musical guest in 1989. In 2022, Byrne again collaborated with Mala Gaonkar on another immersive theater production based on his life, "Theater of the Mind" transforming a 15,000 square-foot warehouse in Denver, Colorado.

Byrne appeared on the final week of The Late Show with Stephen Colbert in May 2026 to perform "Burning Down the House" with the Why is the Sky? band and host Stephen Colbert. In October 2026 Byrne released a single, Let Me Sell You a Dream, in collaboration with English composer Daniel Pemberton, to be used in director Alex Gibney's documentary on Elon Musk, titled MUSK.

=== Other contributions ===
==== 1990–2010 ====
Byrne has contributed songs to five AIDS benefit compilation albums produced by the Red Hot Organization: Red Hot + Blue (1990), Red Hot + Rio (1996), Silencio=Muerte: Red Hot + Latin (1997), Onda Sonora: Red Hot + Lisbon (1998), and Offbeat: A Red Hot Soundtrip (1996). He appeared as a guest vocalist guitarist for alternative rock band 10,000 Maniacs during their MTV Unplugged concert, though the songs in which he is featured were cut from the following album. One of them, "Let the Mystery Be", appeared as the fourth track on 10,000 Maniacs' CD single "Few and Far Between".

On March 24, 1992, he performed with Richard Thompson at St. Ann & the Holy Trinity Church in Brooklyn Heights, New York. The concert was recorded and released as An Acoustic Evening. Byrne worked with Latin superstar Selena in March 1995; writing, producing and singing a bilingual duet titled "God's Child (Baila Conmigo)". This became the last song Selena recorded before she was murdered on March 31, 1995. The song was included on Selena's fifth and final studio album Dreaming of You. In 1997, Byrne was the host of Sessions at West 54th during its second of three seasons and collaborated with members of Devo and Morcheeba to record the album Feelings. In 2001, a version of Byrne's single "Like Humans Do", edited to remove its reference to cannabis, was selected by Microsoft as the sample music for Windows XP to demonstrate Windows Media Player.

In 2002, Byrne co-wrote and provided vocals for "Lazy" by the English house duo X-Press 2, which reached No. 2 on the UK singles chart and number one on the US Dance Chart. Byrne released an orchestral version on his 2004 album Grown Backwards. In September 2004, Byrne co-authored a CD collection and performed with Gilberto Gil at a benefit concert promoting the Creative Commons (CC) license. In 2006, his vocals were featured on "The Heart's a Lonely Hunter" on The Cosmic Game by electronic music duo Thievery Corporation. In 2007, he provided a cover version of the Fiery Furnaces' song "Ex-Guru" for a compilation to celebrate the 15th anniversary of the founding of Thrill Jockey, a Chicago-based record label.

In April 2008, Byrne took part in the Paul Simon retrospective concert series at Brooklyn Academy of Music (BAM) performing "You Can Call Me Al" and "I Know What I Know" from Simon's seventh solo studio album Graceland (1986). Later that year, Byrne and his production team turned the Battery Maritime Building, a 99-year-old ferry terminal in Manhattan, into a playable musical instrument. The structure was connected electronically to a pipe organ and made playable for a piece called Playing the Building. This project was previously installed in Stockholm, Sweden, in 2005, and later at the Roundhouse in London in 2009. Byrne says that the point of the project was to allow people to experience art first hand, by creating music with the organ, rather than simply looking at it. Also in 2008, he collaborated with the Brighton Port Authority, composing the music and singing the lyrics for "Toe Jam".

Byrne is featured on the tracks "Money" and "The People Tree", on N.A.S.A.'s debut and sole studio album The Spirit of Apollo (2009). In 2009, he also appeared on HIV/AIDS charity album Dark Was the Night for Red Hot Organization. He collaborated with indie rock band Dirty Projectors on their song "Knotty Pine". In the same year, Byrne performed at Bonnaroo in Manchester, Tennessee. He also was a signator of a letter protesting the decision of the Toronto International Film Festival to choose Tel Aviv, Israel as the subject of its inaugural City-to-City Spotlight strand.

==== 2011–present ====
In May 2011, Byrne contributed backing vocals to the Arcade Fire track "Speaking in Tongues" which appeared on the deluxe edition of their third studio album The Suburbs (2010). Composer Jherek Bischoff's second studio album Composed (2012) features Byrne on the track "Eyes". The same year, he also released a concert recorded with Brazilian singer-songwriter Caetano Veloso in 2004 at New York City's Carnegie Hall (Live at Carnegie Hall). In March 2013, he debuted a fully staged production of his 2010 concept album Here Lies Love at The Public Theater in New York, directed by the Tony Award nominee Alex Timbers following its premiere at MoCA earlier in the year. That same month, he and Sakamoto released a re-recording of their 1994 collaboration "Psychedelic Afternoon" to raise money and awareness for children impacted by the 2011 Tōhoku earthquake and tsunami.

In May 2014, Byrne announced his involvement with Anna Calvi's extended play (EP), Strange Weather, collaborating with her on two songs: a cover version of Keren Ann's "Strange Weather" and Connan Mockasin's "I'm the Man, That Will Find You". In August 2016, he was featured on "Snoopies" on the Kickstarter-funded album, And the Anonymous Nobody... by hip-hop group De La Soul. In 2022, he co-wrote and provided vocals on the song "This Is a Life" for the original soundtrack to the 2022 film Everything Everywhere All at Once, alongside the film's composers Son Lux and American singer Mitski. Byrne performed the song with Son Lux at the 95th Academy Awards, with Stephanie Hsu providing vocals in place of Mitski.

On July 20, 2023, the stage version of Here Lies Love made its Broadway debut. In the leadup to the premiere, Broadway's musicians' union criticized the show for planning to use a pre-recorded soundtrack and no live musicians. Local 802 of the American Federation of Musicians (AFM) criticized this choice as "a direct attack on Broadway audiences—and live music". Statements from the creative team claiming that the decision was inspired by karaoke and that the show "does not believe in artistic gatekeepers" attracted further criticism from union members, who accused Byrne of "denigrating" and "tossing aside" live musicians and likened his remarks to union busting. Following this, the creative team for Here Lies Love announced that the show would employ twelve live musicians, including three actor-musicians. At the 77th Tony Awards in June 2024, Byrne and Fatboy Slim were nominated for the Tony Award for Best Original Score for Here Lies Love.

On April 19, 2024, Byrne released a cover version of Paramore's Talking Heads-inspired 2017 song "Hard Times". This came after Paramore themselves contributed a cover version of "Burning Down the House" to the Talking Heads tribute album Everyone's Getting Involved earlier that year. Both covers were released as A-side and B-side respectively on a limited edition twelve-inch single for Record Store Day 2024, for which Paramore were ambassadors. For the September 2025 deluxe edition of Miley Cyrus's ninth studio album Something Beautiful, he collaborated with Cyrus on the 13-minute experimental track "Lockdown".

Byrne released a January 2026 cover version of Olivia Rodrigo's 2021 song "Drivers License", marking the song's five-year anniversary: Byrne's cover version being the first in a series celebrating the anniversary of Rodrigo's debut studio album Sour. He appeared in the October 2026 music video for Rodrigo's song "Expectations" featuring Chappell Roan.

== Other work ==
David Byrne co-founded the world music record label Luaka Bop with Yale Evelev in 1990. It was originally created to release Latin American compilations, but it has grown to include music from Cuba, Africa, the Far East and beyond, releasing the work of artists such as Cornershop, Os Mutantes, Los de Abajo, Jim White, Zap Mama, Tom Zé, Los Amigos Invisibles, and King Changó. In 2005, Byrne initiated his own Internet radio station, Radio David Byrne. Each month, he posts a playlist of music he likes, linked by themes or genres. Byrne's playlists have included African popular music, country music classics, vox humana, classical opera and film scores from Italian movies.

Byrne serves on the board of directors of SoundExchange, an organization designated by the United States Congress to collect and distribute digital performance royalties for sound recordings. In 2006, Byrne released Arboretum, a sketchbook facsimile of his Tree Drawings, published by McSweeney's. Byrne is a visual artist whose work has been shown in contemporary art galleries and museums around since the 1990s. He is represented by the Pace/MacGill Gallery in New York. In 2010, his original artwork was in the exhibition The Record: Contemporary Art and Vinyl at the Nasher Museum of Art at Duke University in Durham, North Carolina.

=== TED ===
David Byrne has been a speaker at the TED conferences. In June 2010, he spoke at the TED conference about the effects of architecture on music. Later in October 2010, he performed a song from Talking Heads' eighth and final studio album Naked (1988), "(Nothing But) Flowers", along with English musician Thomas Dolby and the string quartet Ethel, who together made up the TED2010 house band.

== Personal life ==
Byrne lives in New York City. His father, Thomas, died in October 2013. His mother, Emma, died in June 2014. Although a resident of the United States since childhood, Byrne was solely a British citizen until 2012, when he became a dual citizen of the United Kingdom and the United States. He has also held Irish citizenship since 2020. Speaking of his Scottish origins in a 2014 interview with the Evening Standard, Byrne said: "I have lived in the States pretty much my whole life, but from my parents and everything, there's still an affinity to maybe a Scottish sense of humour, and some of the attitudes that go with that." During the 2014 Scottish independence referendum, Byrne expressed his preference for Scotland to remain part of the United Kingdom.

Byrne describes himself as having autism but has not been professionally diagnosed. In a 2020 interview on Amy Schumer's podcast 3 Girls, 1 Keith, he said that he felt that his condition was a superpower as it allows him to hyperfocus on his creative pursuits. In 2012, he said that he felt that music was his way of communicating when he could not do it face to face because of his autism. He is an avid reader. On Desert Island Discs, his book choice was Oliver Sacks's The River of Consciousness.

=== Relationships ===
Byrne had a brief relationship with Toni Basil in 1981, and he dated Twyla Tharp between 1981 and 1982. While visiting Japan in 1982, Byrne met costume designer Adelle Lutz, and they married in 1987. They have a daughter, born in 1989, and two grandsons, born in 2018 and 2025. Byrne and Lutz divorced in 2004. After his divorce, he became romantically involved with the art curator and Gagosian Gallery sales director Louise Neri. He also had a relationship with the artist Cindy Sherman from 2007 to 2011. In late August 2025, Byrne revealed he was engaged to businesswoman Mala Gaonkar, and on September 3, 2025, he said they would be married that week.

=== Cycling ===
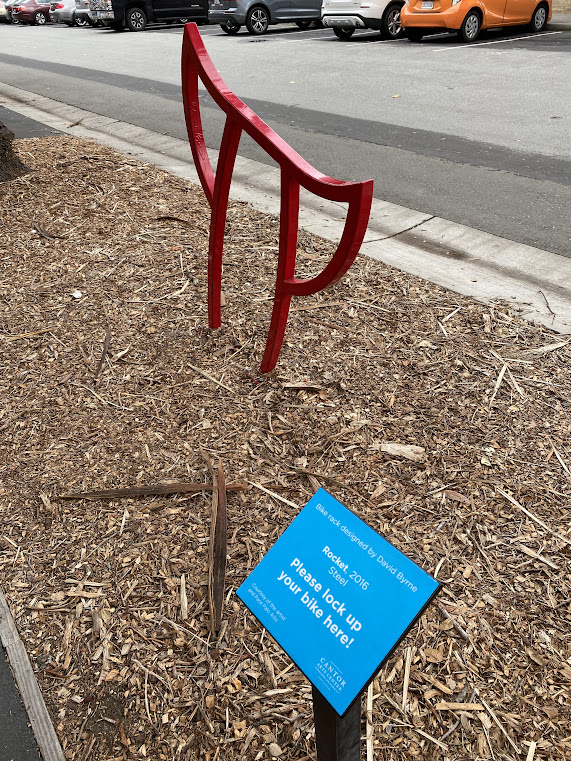
A bike rack designed by Byrne outside the Cantor Arts Center at Stanford University in Stanford, California

Byrne is known for his activism in support of increased cycling and for having used a bike as his main means of transport throughout his life, especially cycling around New York. In Los Angeles, Byrne drives a vintage Citroën DS, but in New York, he does not drive a car. Byrne says that he began cycling while he was in high school and returned to it as an adult in the late 1970s. He likes the freedom and exhilaration cycling gives him. He has written widely on cycling, including a 2009 book, Bicycle Diaries. In August 2009, Byrne auctioned his Montague folding bike to raise money for the London Cycling Campaign (LCC).

In 2008, Byrne designed a series of bicycle parking racks in the form of image outlines corresponding to the areas in which they were located, such as a dollar sign for Wall Street and an electric guitar in Williamsburg, Brooklyn. Byrne worked with a manufacturer who constructed the racks in exchange for the right to sell them later as art. The racks remained on the streets for about a year. Two bike racks constructed from the Byrne Bike Rack Alphabet, a system of modular letter segments that can be combined to form various words, remain installed at the Brooklyn Academy of Music (BAM). In 2023, he arrived at the Met Gala on a Budnitz single-speed bicycle.

== Discography and other works ==
=== Studio albums with Talking Heads ===
- Talking Heads: 77 (1977)
- More Songs About Buildings and Food (1978)
- Fear of Music (1979)
- Remain in Light (1980)
- Speaking in Tongues (1983)
- Little Creatures (1985)
- True Stories (1986)
- Naked (1988)

=== Solo studio albums and collaborations ===
- My Life in the Bush of Ghosts (1981) (with Brian Eno)
- Rei Momo (1989)
- Uh-Oh (1992)
- David Byrne (1994)
- Feelings (1997)
- Look into the Eyeball (2001)
- Grown Backwards (2004)
- Everything That Happens Will Happen Today (2008) (with Brian Eno)
- Here Lies Love (2010) (with Fatboy Slim)
- Love This Giant (2012) (with St. Vincent)
- American Utopia (2018)
- Who Is the Sky? (2025) (with Ghost Train Orchestra)

=== Soundtracks and music for theater ===
Year	Album details	Peak chart positions		Notes
Year	Album details	US	UK	Notes
1981	The Catherine Wheel: Released: November 1981; Labels: Sire	104	—	Music for the 1981 Twyla Tharp dance production The Catherine Wheel.
1985	Music for "The Knee Plays": Released: May 1985; Labels: ECM	141	—	Music for Philip Glass and Robert Wilson's opera The Civil Wars: A Tree Is Best Measured When It Is Down (1984). Re-released as The Knee Plays in 2007.
1986	Sounds from True Stories: Released: 1986; Labels: Sire	—	—	Soundtrack to the film True Stories.
1987	The Last Emperor: Released: 1987; Labels: Virgin	152	—	Score to the film The Last Emperor, composed with Ryuichi Sakamoto and Cong Su.
1991	The Forest: Released: June 1991; Labels: Luaka Bop; Warner Bros.	—	—	Music for the 1988 Robert Wilson theatre piece The Forest.
1999	Your Action World: Released: January 1, 1999; Labels: Self-released	—	—	Music for Byrne's art presentation of Your Action World.
1999	In Spite of Wishing and Wanting: Released: 1999; Labels: Self-released	—	—	Music for the Wim Vandekeybus dance production In Spite of Wishing and Wanting.
2003	E.E.E.I. (Envisioning Emotional Epistemological Information): Released: July 2, 2003; Labels: Self-released	—	—	Music for Byrne's speaking tour and PowerPoint presentation.
2003	Lead Us Not into Temptation: Released: September 30, 2003; Labels: Thrill Jockey	—	—	Soundtrack to the film Young Adam.
2008	Big Love: Hymnal: Released: August 19, 2008; Labels: Todo Mundo; HBO; Playtone	—	—	Soundtrack to the second season of Big Love.
2010	Here Lies Love: Released: April 6, 2010; Labels: Todo Mundo/Nonesuch	96	76	With Fatboy Slim. A disco song cycle occasionally given staged performances.
2019	American Utopia on Broadway Original Cast Recording: Released: October 25, 2019; Labels: Nonesuch	—	—	Original cast recording of the Broadway production of American Utopia.

- "—" denotes albums that were released but did not chart, albums not released in a particular territory, or chart information is not available.

=== Film and television ===
Concert films

Year	Title	Role	Notes
1984	Stop Making Sense	Himself	Concert film from Talking Heads tour; also composer
1992	Between the Teeth – Live	Himself	VHS release; also composer
2004	David Byrne Live at Union Chapel	Himself	
2010	Ride, Rise, Roar	Himself	Concert documentary
2020	American Utopia	Himself	

Other film and television

Year	Title	Role	Notes
1979	Saturday Night Live	Himself	Episode: "Cicely Tyson/Talking Heads"
1986	True Stories	The Narrator	Feature film; also director, writer, composer
1987	The Last Emperor	—	Feature film; composer
1988	Married to the Mob	—	Feature film; composer
1989	Heavy Petting	—	Documentary; interviewed subject
1989	Ile Aiye (The House of Life)	—	Documentary; composer
1989	Saturday Night Live	Himself	Episode: "Woody Harrelson/David Byrne"
1995	Space Ghost Coast to Coast	Himself	Episode: "Fire Drill"
2003	Young Adam	—	Feature film; composer
2003, 2012	The Simpsons	Himself (voice)	Episodes: "Dude, Where's My Ranch?", "How I Wet Your Mother"
2007	Big Love	—	12 episodes; composer
2011	This Must Be the Place	Himself	Feature film
2016	Contemporary Color	—	Feature film; composer
2019	John Mulaney & the Sack Lunch Bunch	Himself	Children's musical comedy special
2020	Saturday Night Live	Himself	Episode: "John Mulaney/David Byrne"
2025	Étoile	Himself	(S01:E05) "The Rat"

== Tours ==
- Rei Momo Tour (1989–1990)
- Uh-Oh Tour (1992)
- David Byrne Tour (1994)
- Feelings Tour (1997–1998)
- Look into the Eyeball Tour (2001–2002)
- Grown Backwards Tour (2004–2005)
- Songs of David Byrne and Brian Eno Tour (2008–2009) (with Brian Eno)
- Love This Giant Tour (2012–2013) (with St. Vincent)
- American Utopia Tour (2018)
- Who Is the Sky? Tour (2025–2026)

== Bibliography ==
Sources:

- True Stories (1986)
- Preface for Occupied Territory by Lynne Cohen, Aperture Foundation (1987)
- Strange Ritual, Chronicle Books (1995)
- Your Action World (1999)
- The New Sins (Los Nuevos Pecados) (2001)
- David Byrne Asks You: What Is It? Smart Art Press (2002)
- Envisioning Emotional Epistemological Information with DVD (2003)
- Arboretum (2006)
- Bicycle Diaries (2009)
- How Music Works (2012)
- American Utopia (2020)
- A History of the World (in Dingbats): Drawings & Words (2022)
- Sleeping Beauties: Why Good Ideas Go Dormant and How They Wake Up (2026)
