= Songs of David Byrne and Brian Eno Tour =

2008–09 concert tour by David Byrne

- Promotional tour by David Byrne
- Promotional poster for Byrne's tour
- Location: North America (first leg); Europe, Asia, and Oceania (second leg); Europe (third leg); United States (fourth leg); Europe (fifth leg)
- Associated album: Everything That Happens Will Happen Today
- Start date: September 16, 2008
- End date: August 9, 2009
- Legs: Five
- No. of shows: 51 (first leg); 20 (second leg); 36 (third leg); 17 (fourth leg); 24 (fifth leg); 148 (total)
- Website: www.davidbyrne.com/tours/history.php

David Byrne concert chronology
- My Backwards Life Tour (2004–2005); Songs of David Byrne and Brian Eno Tour (2008–2009); Cities, Bicycles, and the Future of Getting Around (2009–2011)

The Songs of David Byrne and Brian Eno Tour is a 2008–2009 concert tour by David Byrne, performing music written by Byrne and Brian Eno. It promoted Byrne and Eno's album Everything That Happens Will Happen Today. The musical performers were accompanied by dancers who were choreographed to several songs. Performances were held across the world and later documented on a tour EP and a concert film.

== Material ==
Byrne assembled a band to tour for the album, performing music throughout the latter half of 2008 and early 2009 across North America, Europe, and Australasia. He hired more singers than he had on previous tours to reproduce the complex vocal harmonies of the album and was inspired to bring along dancers after seeing Sufjan Stevens promote the album Illinois as well as the Japanese films Funky Forest and The Taste of Tea. Byrne was initially uninvolved in the choreography, but made more suggestions as the tour went on and after he saw a live performance by Deerhoof that incorporated dancing with instruments. He began booking tour dates before the album was completed and continued writing his book The Bicycle Diaries throughout the tour.

In planning the set lists for the tour, Byrne initially considered only promoting this album, but decided to assemble songs this album as well as their previous collaborations, including the Talking Heads albums More Songs About Buildings and Food, Fear of Music, and Remain in Light and Byrne's The Catherine Wheel soundtrack. By playing music from all of their collaborations, Byrne hoped to "draw a line linking this new material with what we did 30 years ago" with the goal of clarifying the connection between all of the duo's previous work. In reviewing the music, he found that "[t]here might be more continuity than I imagined, which I hope is going to work in my favor." Although he was invited to participate and early reports indicated that would, Eno chose to not tour, letting Byrne decide how to present this music live.

A month after releasing the album, Byrne was skeptical of market saturation, claiming "I sense that a lot of people don't know we have a record out" and hoped to counterbalance that ignorance with this tour. At the same time, the main goal of the performance was not promotion but the show itself.

=== Set lists ===
The set list for the first night:

Set

1. "Strange Overtones" (originally from Everything That Happens Will Happen Today)
2. "I Zimbra" (Fear of Music)
3. "One Fine Day" (Everything That Happens Will Happen Today)
4. "Help Me Somebody" (My Life in the Bush of Ghosts)
5. "Houses in Motion" (Remain in Light)
6. "My Big Nurse" (Everything That Happens Will Happen Today)
7. "My Big Hands (Fall Through the Cracks)" (The Catherine Wheel)
8. "Heaven" (Fear of Music)
9. "Home" (Everything That Happens Will Happen Today)
10. "The River" (Everything That Happens Will Happen Today)
11. "Crosseyed and Painless" (Remain in Light)
12. "Life Is Long" (Everything That Happens Will Happen Today)
13. "Once In a Lifetime" (Remain in Light)
14. "Life During Wartime" (Fear of Music)
15. "I Feel My Stuff" (Everything That Happens Will Happen Today)

Encore

16. "Take Me to the River" (More Songs About Buildings and Food)
17. "The Great Curve" (Remain in Light)

Second encore

18. "Everything That Happens" (Everything That Happens Will Happen Today)

By the time he reached St. Louis in mid-October, the following set was played:

Set

1. "Strange Overtones"
2. "I Zimbra"
3. "One Fine Day"
4. "Help Me Somebody"
5. "Houses in Motion"
6. "My Big Nurse"
7. "My Big Hands (Fall Through the Cracks)"
8. "Heaven"
9. "Never Thought" (originally from the deluxe edition of Everything That Happens Will Happen Today)
10. "The River"
11. "Crosseyed and Painless"
12. "Life Is Long"
13. "Once In a Lifetime"
14. "Life During Wartime"
15. "I Feel My Stuff"

Encore

16. "Take Me to the River"
17. "The Great Curve"

Second encore

18. "Air" (Fear of Music)
19. "Burning Down the House" (Speaking in Tongues)
20. "Everything That Happens"

Midway through this leg, Byrne expanded some shows to have three encores, such as Omaha, Indianapolis, Toronto, and Raleigh. The first was as listed above, the second was "Don't Worry About the Government" and "Burning Down the House", and the third was "Everything That Happens". He also played this extended encore at the Hong Kong and Sydney shows. Byrne expanded his February 28, 2009, show to contain four two-song encores.

== Musicians and technical personnel ==
=== Performers ===
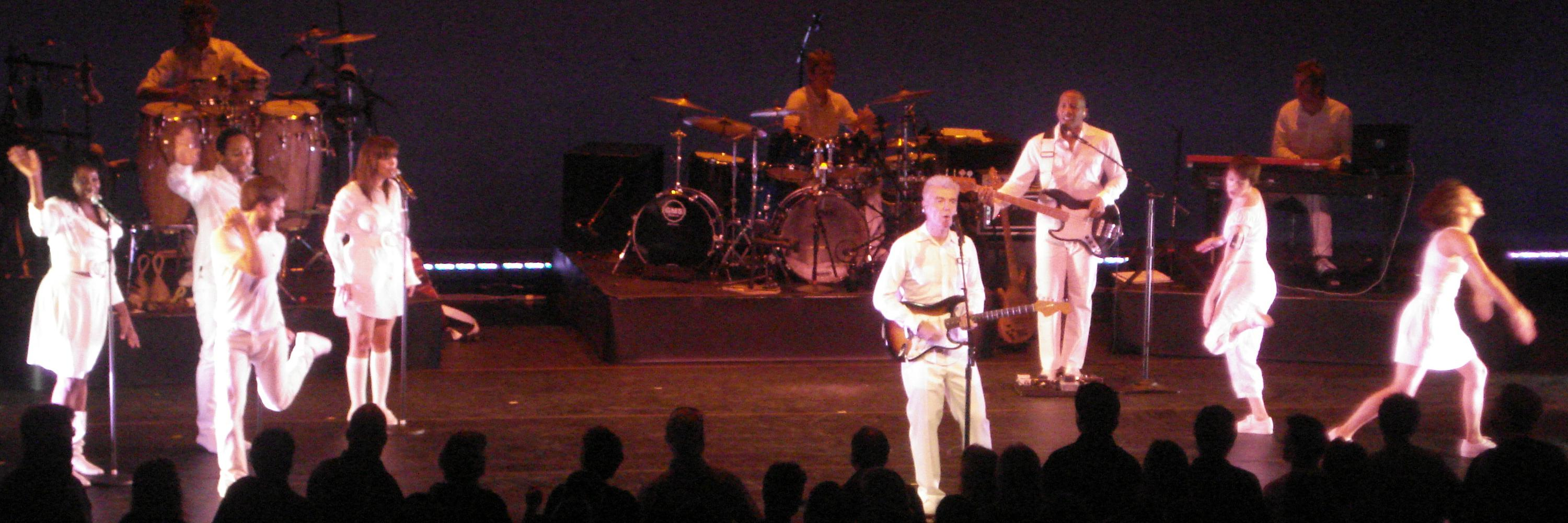
Performers from the Songs of David Byrne and Brian Eno Tour on the opening night—September 16, 2008—at the Zoellner Arts Center - Baker Hall in Bethlehem, Pennsylvania. (Left to right): Back: Refosco, Hawthorne, and De Gli Antoni Middle: Kaïssa, R. Frazier, Muldaur and P. Frazier Front: Reker, Byrne, Kuhn, and Baldwin

Byrne has assembled the following musicians and dancers to accompany him:

- David Byrne – voice and guitar
- Mark De Gli Antoni – keyboards
- Paul Frazier – bass guitar
- Graham Hawthorne – drums
- Mauro Refosco – percussion
- Redray Frazier – background vocals
- Kaïssa – background vocals
- Jenni Muldaur – background vocals
- Lily Baldwin – dancing
- Natalie Kuhn – dancing
- Steven Reker – dancing

Refosco previously toured with Byrne's My Backwards Life band in support of Grown Backwards; like bassist Paul Frazier he also appears on Look into the Eyeball, Grown Backwards, Live from Austin, Texas, and Everything That Happens Will Happen Today. The performers started rehearsals the day that the album was released and continued to rehearse more for this tour than is typical for other Byrne presentations. All performers dress alike in cream-colored jumpsuits and overalls. The dancers have choreographed for seven songs and the entire ensemble performed together for the first time on September 9.

=== Technical crew ===
- Mark Edwards – production manager
- Keith Anderson – tour manager
- Bruce Knight – Front of House
- Mike Lafferty – stage and keyboard technician
- Victor Muñoz – guitar technician
- Don FitzSimmonds – drum technician
- Jeremy Bolton and Michael Conners – PA technicians
- Bob Lewis – monitors
- Jon Pollak – lighting designer/director
- Martin Garnish – lighting
- Abi Lester – wardrobe

The equipment was engineered by Clair Global and included gear from Lab.gruppen, TC Electronic, and Yamaha.

=== Choreographers ===
- Noémie Lafrance
- Annie-B Parson
- Sonya Robbins and Layla Childs aka Robbinschilds Dance

== Supporting acts ==
There were only a handful of dates that included other performers and no opening act was scheduled throughout the tour. Ani DiFranco opened on June 2, 2009, and Byrne played a double bill with Marianne Faithfull opening on July 30, 2009. The Extra Action Marching Band guested on "Burning Down the House" and "Road to Nowhere" on the October 7, 2008, and June 23, 24, and 26, 2009, dates. DeVotchka opened on some 2009 dates.

== Tour dates ==
The tour was expected to run six months into spring 2009, including dates in Australia and Europe before finally concluding after 11 months with five legs worldwide:

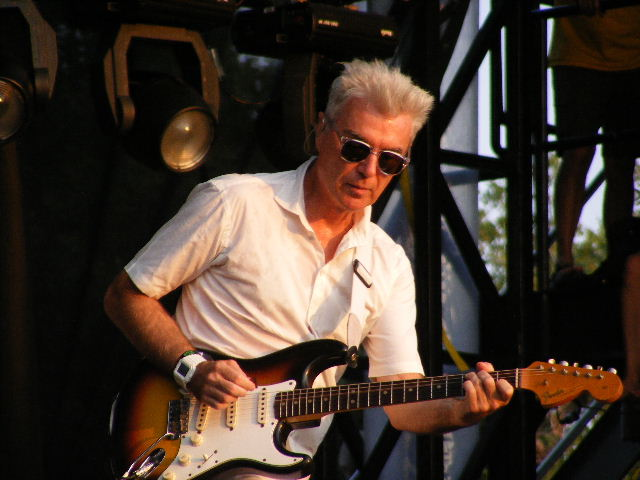
Byrne performed at Austin City Limits during the tour

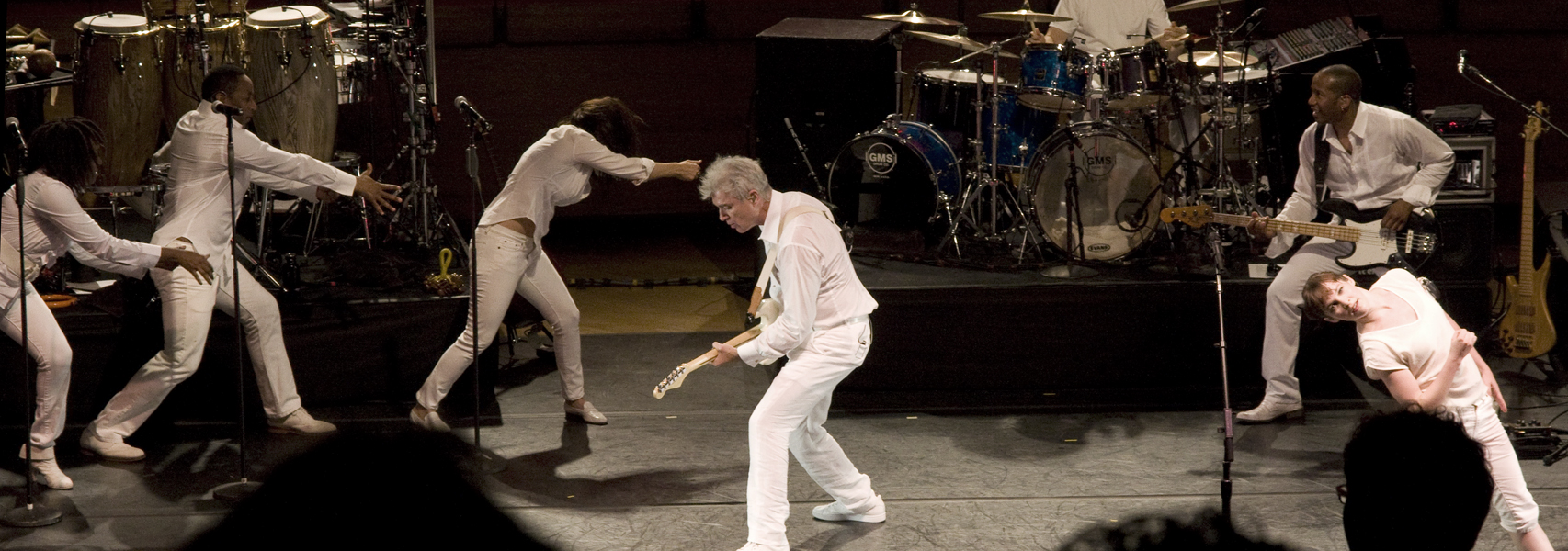
The Songs of David Byrne and Brian Eno Tour sought to integrate pop musical performance with modern dance

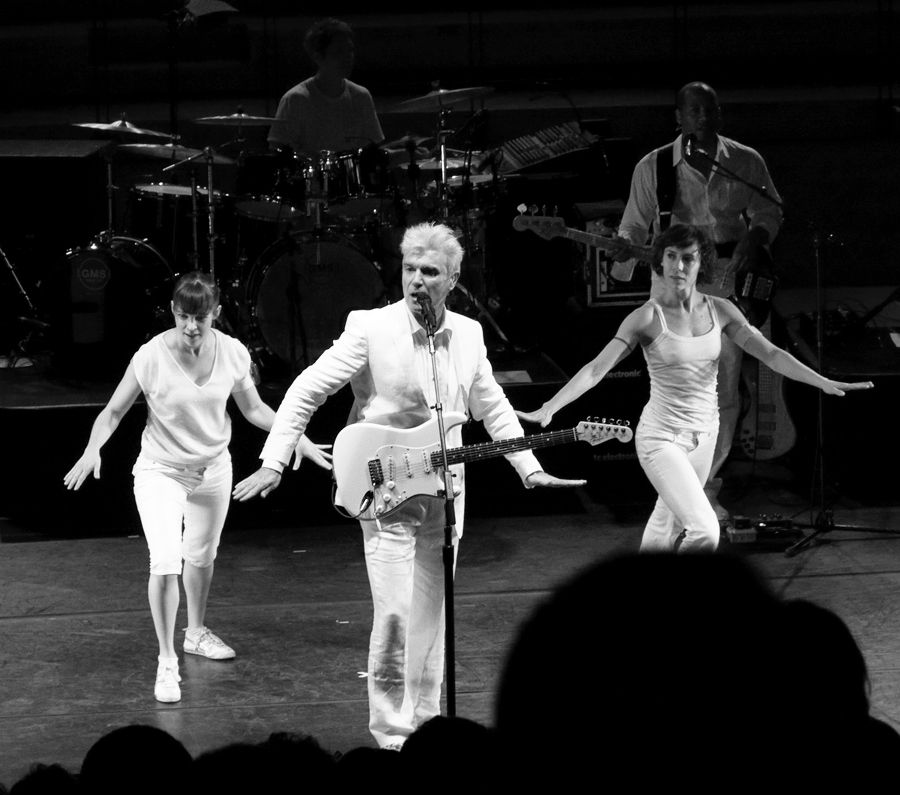
Byrne both performed music and danced with the performers

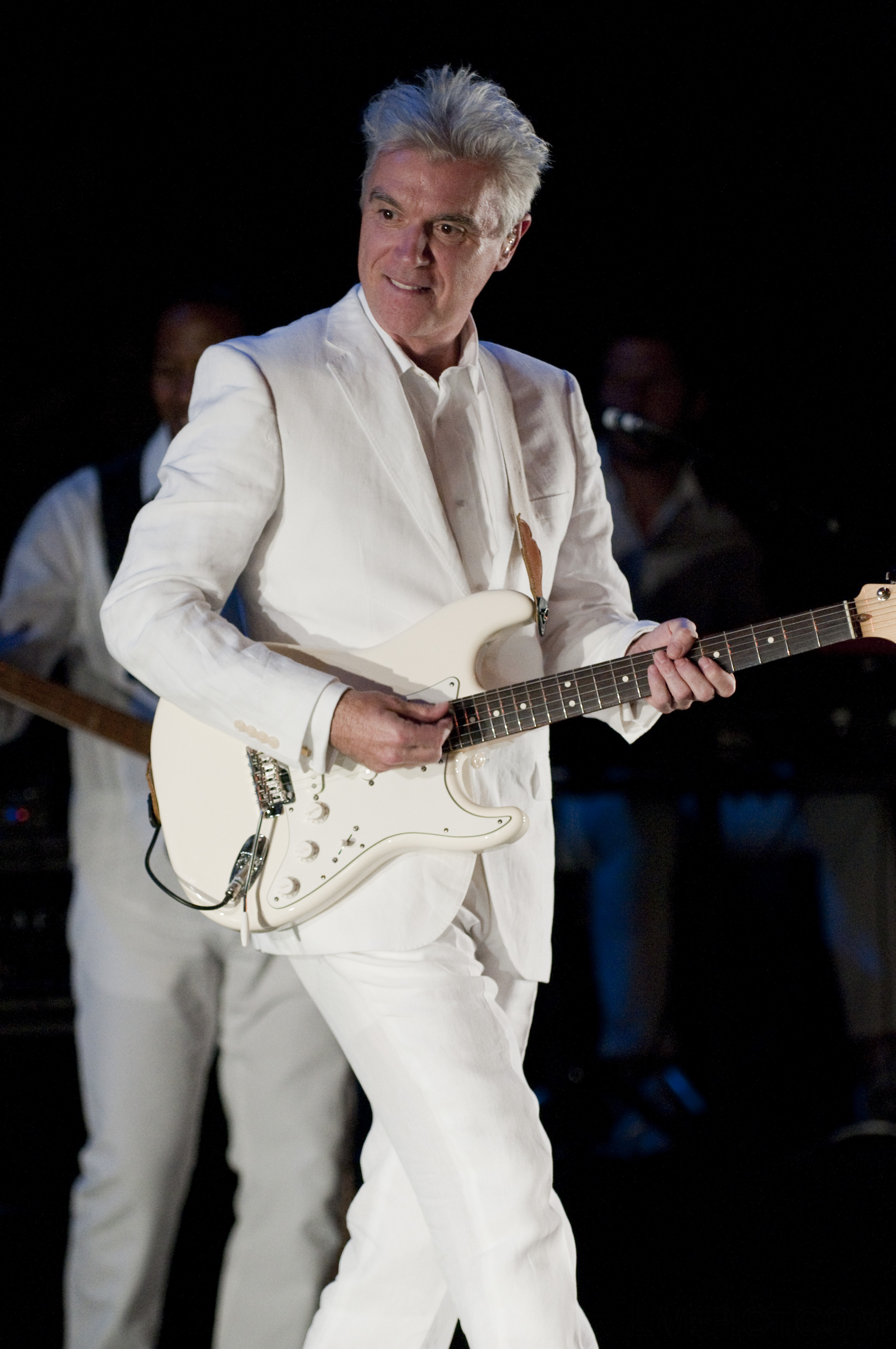
The white suits were a staple of the performances

Date	City	Country	Venue
First leg – North America, fall 2008
16 September 2008	Bethlehem	United States	Zoellner Arts Center – Baker Hall
17 September 2008	Baltimore	United States	Lyric Opera House
18 September 2008	Newport News	United States	Ferguson Center for the Arts
20 September 2008	Atlanta	United States	Chastain Park Amphitheater
21 September 2008	Asheville	United States	Thomas Wolfe Auditorium
22 September 2008	Nashville	United States	Ryman Auditorium
23 September 2008	Memphis	United States	Orpheum Theatre
25 September 2008	Austin	United States	The Paramount Theatre
26 September 2008	Austin	United States	Austin City Limits Music Festival at Zilker Park
28 September 2008	Albuquerque	United States	Kiva Auditorium
30 September 2008	Phoenix	United States	Orpheum Theatre
2 October 2008	San Diego	United States	Humphreys
3 October 2008	Los Angeles	United States	Greek Theatre
4 October 2008	Santa Barbara	United States	Arlington Theater
6 October 2008	San Francisco	United States	Louise M. Davies Symphony Hall
7 October 2008	San Francisco	United States	Louise M. Davies Symphony Hall
8 October 2008	Santa Rosa	United States	Wells Fargo Center for the Arts
~~9 October 2008~~	~~Saratoga~~	United States	~~Mountain Winery~~†
11 October 2008	Park City	United States	Eccles Center for the Performing Arts
12 October 2008	Denver	United States	Buell Theater
14 October 2008	Minneapolis	United States	State Theatre
15 October 2008	Milwaukee	United States	Pabst Theater
17 October 2008	Omaha	United States	Kiewit Concert Hall
18 October 2008	St. Louis	United States	Fox Theatre
19 October 2008	Kansas City	United States	Uptown Theater
21 October 2008	Louisville	United States	The Louisville Palace
23 October 2008	Cleveland	United States	Allen Theatre
24 October 2008	Ann Arbor	United States	Michigan Theater
25 October 2008	Indianapolis	United States	Clowes Memorial Hall
26 October 2008	Chicago	United States	Civic Opera House
29 October 2008	Toronto	Canada	Massey Hall
30 October 2008	Montreal	Canada	Métropolis
31 October 2008	Boston	United States	Citi Performing Arts Center
1 November 2008	Atlantic City	United States	The Borgata
3 November 2008	Red Bank	United States	Count Basie Theatre
5 November 2008	Albany	United States	Empire State Plaza
7 November 2008	Pittsburgh	United States	Carnegie Music Hall
8 November 2008	Upper Darby Township Township	United States	Tower Theater
9 November 2008	Washington, D.C.	United States	Warner Theatre
28 November 2008	Buffalo	United States	UB Center for the Arts
29 November 2008	Syracuse	United States	Landmark Theatre
30 November 2008	New Bedford	United States	Zeiterion Theatre
2 December 2008	Northampton	United States	Calvin Theatre
3 December 2008	Wilmington	United States	Grand Opera House
4 December 2008	York	United States	Strand–Capitol Performing Arts
5 December 2008	Ledyard	United States	Foxwoods Resort Casino
7 December 2008	Knoxville	United States	Tennessee Theatre
8 December 2008	Raleigh	United States	Meymandi Concert Hall
9 December 2008	North Charleston	United States	North Charleston Performing Arts Center
10 December 2008	Charlotte	United States	Ovens Auditorium
12 December 2008	Tampa	United States	Tampa Theatre
13 December 2008	Miami Beach	United States	Fillmore Miami Beach at Jackie Gleason Theater
Second leg – Winter 2009
19 January 2009	Hong Kong	China	Hong Kong Convention and Exhibition Centre
21 January 2009	Singapore	Singapore	Suntec City Concert Hall
23 January 2009	Osaka	Japan	Osaka Hatch
27 January 2009	Tokyo	Japan	Shibuya-AX
28 January 2009	Tokyo	Japan	Shibuya-AX
1 February 2009	Sydney	Australia	Sydney Opera House
2 February 2009	Sydney	Australia	Sydney Opera House
4 February 2009	South Perth	Australia	Perth Zoo
7 February 2009	Brisbane	Australia	Brisbane Convention & Exhibition Centre
9 February 2009	Melbourne	Australia	Hamer Hall
10 February 2009	Melbourne	Australia	Hamer Hall
13 February 2009	Wellington	New Zealand	Michael Fowler Centre
14 February 2009	Auckland	New Zealand	ASB Theatre
18 February 2009	Seattle	United States	Benaroya Hall
19 February 2009	Spokane	United States	Martin Woldson Theater at the Fox
20 February 2009	Vancouver	Canada	Queen Elizabeth Theatre
22 February 2009	Edmonton	Canada	Northern Alberta Jubilee Auditorium
23 February 2009	Calgary	Canada	Jack Singer Concert Hall
27 February 2009	New York City	United States	Radio City Music Hall
28 February 2009	New York City	United States	Radio City Music Hall
Third leg – Europe, spring 2009
9 March 2009	Düsseldorf	Germany	Tonhalle Düsseldorf
10 March 2009	Antwerp	Belgium	Koningin Elisabethzaal
12 March 2009	Hamburg	Germany	Congress Centrum
14 March 2009	Frankfurt	Germany	Alte Oper
16 March 2009	Copenhagen	Denmark	Falkoner Theatre
17 March 2009	Stockholm	Sweden	Cirkus
19 March 2009	Oslo	Norway	Sentrum
20 March 2009	Malmö	Norway	Concert House
22 March 2009	Hanover	Germany	Theater am Aegi
23 March 2009	Berlin	Germany	Tempodrom
24 March 2009	Utrecht	Netherlands	MC Vredenburg
25 March 2009	Paris	France	Olympia
27 March 2009	Bristol	United Kingdom	Colston Hall
29 March 2009	Birmingham	United Kingdom	Symphony Hall
30 March 2009	Manchester	United Kingdom	Bridgewater Hall
31 March 2009	Glasgow	United Kingdom	Glasgow Royal Concert Hall
1 April 2009	Gateshead	United Kingdom	The Sage Gateshead
3 April 2009	Liverpool	United Kingdom	Philharmonic Hall
4 April 2009	Sheffield	United Kingdom	City Hall
6 April 2009	Dublin	Ireland	National Concert Hall
7 April 2009	Belfast	United Kingdom	Waterfront Hall
9 April 2009	Oxford	United Kingdom	New Theatre Oxford
11 April 2009	Nottingham	United Kingdom	Royal Centre
12 April 2009	London	United Kingdom	Royal Festival Hall
13 April 2009	London	United Kingdom	Royal Festival Hall
14 April 2009	Brighton	United Kingdom	Brighton Dome
16 April 2009	Stuttgart	Germany	Hegelsaal
17 April 2009	Zürich	Switzerland	Volkshaus
19 April 2009	Senigallia	Italy	La Fenice
20 April 2009	Verona	Italy	Teatro Filarmonico
21 April 2009	Milan	Italy	Teatro Dal Verme
22 April 2009	Modena	Italy	Teatro Comunale Modena
24 April 2009	Barcelona	Spain	Palau de la Música Catalana
26 April 2009	Oviedo	Spain	Auditorio Príncipe Felipe
27 April 2009	Madrid	Spain	Lope de Vega Theatre
28 April 2009	Lisbon	Portugal	Coliseo
Fourth leg – North America, summer 2009
1 June 2009	Shelburne	United States	The Green at Shelburne Museum
2 June 2009	Hopewell	United States	Constellation Brands – Marvin Sands Performing Arts Center
3 June 2009	Montclair	United States	Wellmont Theatre
5 June 2009	Philadelphia	United States	Mann Center for the Performing Arts
6 June 2009	Vienna	United States	Filene Center
8 June 2009	New York City	United States	Prospect Park Bandshell
10 June 2009	Charlottesville	United States	Charlottesville Pavilion
12 June 2009	Manchester	United States	Bonnaroo Music Festival
14 June 2009	Dallas	United States	Majestic Theatre
15 June 2009	Houston	United States	Jones Hall
17 June 2009	Santa Fe	United States	Lensic Theater
18 June 2009	Telluride	United States	Telluride Bluegrass Festival
20 June 2009	Morrison	United States	Red Rocks Amphitheatre
21 June 2009	Salt Lake City	United States	Red Butte Garden Amphitheatre
23 June 2009	Portland	United States	Arlene Schnitzer Concert Hall
24 June 2009	Seattle	United States	Paramount Theatre
26 June 2009	Berkeley	United States	Hearst Greek Theatre
Fifth leg – Europe, summer 2009
6 July 2009	Athens	Greece	Badminton Theatre
7 July 2009	Skopje	Macedonia	Universal Hall
8 July 2009	Belgrade	Serbia	Sava Centar
10 July 2009	Ljubljana	Slovenia	Križanke
11 July 2009	Vienna	Austria	Open Air Arena
12 July 2009	Ostrava	Czech Republic	Colours Festival
13 July 2009	Warsaw	Poland	Stodola
15 July 2009	Budapest	Hungary	Millenáris Sporttelep
16 July 2009	Graz	Austria	Kasematten
17 July 2009-	Grado	Italy	Diga Nazario Sauro
18 July 2009	Fiesole	Italy	Festival Teatro Romano
20 July 2009	Rome	Italy	Parco della Musica
22 July 2009	Ferrara	Italy	Piazza Castello
23 July 2009	Naples	Italy	Castel Sant'Elmo
24 July 2009	Locorotondo	Italy	Locus Festival, Cantina Sociale
27 July 2009	Cagliari	Italy	Anfiteatro Romano
29 July 2009	Turin	Italy	Real Festival, Palace of Venaria
30 July 2009	Lyon	France	Grand Théâtre Romain de Fourvière
1 August 2009	Lokeren	Belgium	Lokerse Feesten
2 August 2009	Amsterdam	Netherlands	Melkweg
3 August 2009	London	United Kingdom	Barbican Centre
4 August 2009	Southampton	United Kingdom	Southampton Guildhall
8 August 2009	Edinburgh	United Kingdom	Edinburgh Playhouse
9 August 2009	Ledbury	United Kingdom	The Big Chill

†Date scheduled and later canceled

== Everything That Happens Will Happen on This Tour ==
Everything That Happens Will Happen on This Tour – David Byrne on Tour: Songs of David Byrne and Brian Eno

EP (live) by David Byrne
- Released: May 11, 2009
- Recorded: December 4, 2008
- Venues: Strand–Capitol Performing Arts Center, York, Pennsylvania, U.S.
- Genres: Alternative rock; world
- Length: 19:28
- Label: Todo Mundo
- Producer: David Byrne

David Byrne chronology
Big Love: Hymnal (2008)	Everything That Happens Will Happen on This Tour – David Byrne on Tour: Songs of David Byrne and Brian Eno (2009)	Here Lies Love (2010)

David Byrne live chronology
Live from Austin, Texas (2007)	Everything That Happens Will Happen on This Tour – David Byrne on Tour: Songs of David Byrne and Brian Eno (2009)	Live at Carnegie Hall (2012)

Everything That Happens Will Happen on This Tour – David Byrne on Tour: Songs of David Byrne and Brian Eno is a 2009 live EP released by David Byrne recorded during the Songs of David Byrne and Brian Eno Tour. The album is composed of live recordings of three songs from the 2009 Byrne/Eno collaboration Everything That Happens Will Happen Today and one—"Help Me Somebody"—from their 1981 album My Life in the Bush of Ghosts.

=== Recording and release ===
Byrne was approached by Amnesty International to get involved in his tour. For years, Byrne had performed one date on his tours as a benefit and decided to record this EP with proceeds from sales benefiting the organization.

Byrne's band performed with an audio system that could professionally record every show based around Pro Tools. Byrne had these recordings mixed by Patrick Dillett—who was also responsible for engineering on Everything That Happens Will Happen Today.

The album was made available digitally in the form of DRM-free 320 kbit/s MP3s with the option of a FLAC as well. Like Everything That Happens Will Happen Today, the EP was marketed with Internet startup Topspin Media.

The album received a positive review from The Village Voice, calling it "cheerful" and "lovely."

=== Track listing ===
All songs written by David Byrne and Brian Eno; "Strange Overtones" co-written by Leo Abrahams.

1. "Strange Overtones" – 4:37
2. "Help Me Somebody" – 3:28
3. "One Fine Day" – 4:34
4. "I Feel My Stuff" – 6:29

=== Personnel ===
- David Byrne – vocals and guitar
- Mark De Gli Antoni – keyboards
- Paul Frazier – bass guitar
- Redray Frazier – background vocals
- Graham Hawthorne – drums
- Kaïssa – background vocals
- Jenni Muldaur – background vocals
- Mauro Refosco – percussion

== Ride, Rise, Roar ==
On February 11, 2010, it was announced that a documentary film entitled Ride, Rise, Roar chronicling the tour would be released to the 2010 film festival circuit. The debut will be at South by Southwest on March 15, 2010, where it will be screened in all three media categories—film, interactive, and music. The film was the feature-length directorial debut by Hillman Curtis—who also worked on the short film that accompanies the deluxe edition of Everything That Happens Will Happen Today. The film includes concert footage, footage of the planning and rehearsals for the tour, and exclusive interviews with Byrne, Eno, and the supporting musicians and dancers. Curtis was initially contacted to document the tour with no clear objective for the film and decided to focus on the collaboration between Byrne and his tour mates as well as the unique challenge of combining popular music with modern dance.

== Stalking incident ==
While on tour, dancer Lily Baldwin started receiving letters from a stalker following the show in Europe. She turned her experience into the 2017 film Glass and began a website offering resources for those who are being stalked.

== See also ==
- Ballet
- Modern dance
