= Ride, Rise, Roar =

2010 David Byrne concert film directed by Hillman Curtis

- A film poster for Ride, Rise, Roar
- Directed by: Hillman Curtis
- Produced by: Will Schluter; Ben Wolf (co-producer)
- Starring: David Byrne
- Cinematography: Ben Wolf
- Edited by: Matt Boyd; Hillman Curtis
- Music by: David Byrne; Brian Eno
- Production company: Hillmancurtis Films
- Distributed by: A-Film (Benelux); Kaleidoscope (UK and Ireland); Umbrella Entertainment (Australia); Uplink (Japan)
- Release date: March 15, 2010 (SXSW)
- Running time: 87:00
- Country: United States
- Language: English

Ride, Rise, Roar is a documentary film chronicling the Songs of David Byrne and Brian Eno Tour conducted by American musician David Byrne in 2008–2009. The film includes concert footage, footage of the planning and rehearsals for the tour, and exclusive interviews with Byrne, Eno, and the supporting musicians and dancers.

== Production ==
Curtis initially proposed documenting the tour with no clear objective for the film and decided to focus on the collaboration between Byrne and his tour mates as well as the unique challenge of combining popular music with modern dance. Byrne wanted the film to display what it takes to put on a concert.

== Release ==
The film was released to the 2010 film festival circuit, with the debut at South by Southwest on March 15, 2010, where it was screened in all three media categories—film, interactive, and music. Following this, it was displayed by the Seattle International Film Festival and Silverdocs. The film is the feature-length directorial debut by Hillman Curtis—who also worked on the short film that accompanies the deluxe edition of the Byrne–Eno album Everything That Happens Will Happen Today. Byrne attended some British screenings for question and answer sessions.

== Reception ==
On review aggregator Rotten Tomatoes the film has an approval rating of 78% based on reviews from 9 critics. Most positive reviews were restrained: for instance, The Quietus called the film "handsome albeit conventional"; writing for The Guardian, Andrew Pulver noted that it was a "pretty straightforward concert movie" and gave the film three out of five stars, but criticized Curtis' direction for using bland shots. A negative review from The Stranger's Christopher Frizzelle advised potential viewers to "run in the other direction" due to the poor choreography and dull interviews. The Independent's Anthony Quinn found the choreography unacceptable as well as Byrne's arrangement and song selection. Other reviews—such as Empire's Phil de Semlyen—preferred the emphasis on dance and found the choreography enjoyable. A complaint of several reviewers was the lack of uninterrupted musical performances, with interview clips cutting short the live footage.

Comparisons with the 1984 Talking Heads documentary Stop Making Sense were inevitable—The Seattle Times even dubbed this a "sequel"—and reviews universally found the former film to be stronger. For instance, View London considers Ride, Rise, Roar entertaining, but "not on the level of classica rockumentaries", whereas Stop Making Sense is "generally reckoned to be one of the best concert movies ever made." Time Out Chicago's assessment of Hillman Curtis acknowledges the "challenging position" that he was in by being compared to Jonathan Demme's direction, but sums up the review by calling the film "a very satisfying experience."

== Songs ==
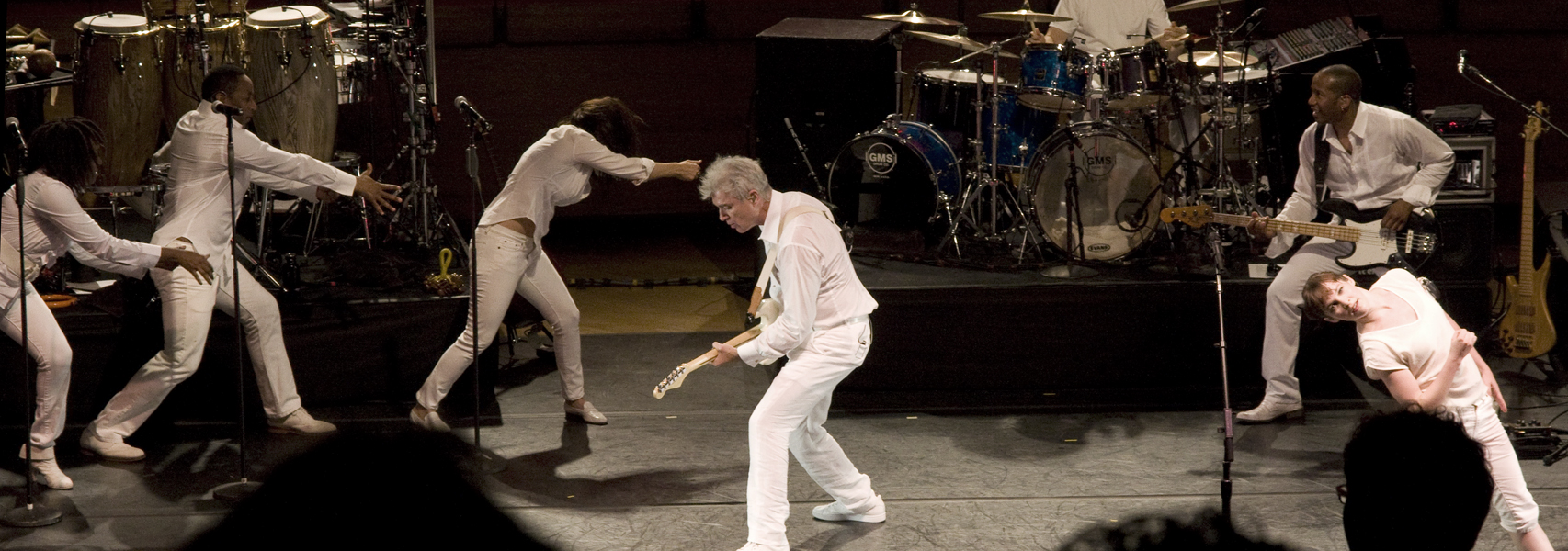
Byrne onstage during the Songs of David Byrne and Brian Eno tour.

The movie includes performances of the following songs:

- "Once in a Lifetime" (David Byrne, Brian Eno, Chris Frantz, Jerry Harrison, and Tina Weymouth)
- "Life Is Long" (Byrne and Eno)
- "I Zimbra" (Byrne, Eno, and Hugo Ball)
- "Road to Nowhere" (Byrne)
- "One Fine Day" (Byrne and Eno)
- "The Great Curve" (Byrne, Eno, Frantz, Harrison, and Weymouth)
- "My Big Nurse" (Byrne and Eno)
- "Burning Down the House" (Byrne, Frantz, Harrison, and Weymouth)
- "Houses in Motion" (Byrne, Eno, Frantz, Harrison, and Weymouth)
- "Air" (Byrne)
- "Life During Wartime" (Byrne, Frantz, Harrison, and Weymouth)
- "Heaven" (Byrne and Harrison)
- "I Feel My Stuff" (Byrne and Eno)
- "Everything That Happens" (Byrne and Eno)

== Personnel ==
- David Byrne – voice and guitar
- Mark De Gli Antoni – keyboards
- Paul Frazier – bass guitar
- Graham Hawthorne – drums
- Mauro Refosco – percussion, acoustic guitar
- Redray Frazier – background vocals, acoustic guitar
- Kaïssa – background vocals
- Jenni Muldaur – background vocals
- Lily Baldwin – dancing
- Natalie Kuhn – dancing
- Steven Reker – dancing

Additional appearances as interviewees (not on stage)

- David Whitehead – David Byrne's manager
- Annie-B. Parson – choreography ("I Zimbra")
- Sonya Robbins and Layla Childs a.k.a. Robbinschilds Dance – choreography ("The Great Curve")
- Noémie Lafrance – choreography ("I Feel My Stuff")
- Brian Eno – co-composer

== See also ==
- Everything That Happens Will Happen Today
- Songs of David Byrne and Brian Eno Tour
- Everything That Happens Will Happen on This Tour – David Byrne on Tour: Songs of David Byrne and Brian Eno
