= Strange Overtones =

David Byrne and Brian Eno single from 2008

Single by David Byrne and Brian Eno

from the album Everything That Happens Will Happen Today
- Released: August 4, 2008
- Recorded: Demoed in Eno's London home studio (2006), finished by Byrne and Leo Abrahams in New York City (2008)
- Genre: Art rock; gospel; electronic
- Length: 4:17
- Label: Todo Mundo
- Songwriters: David Byrne; Brian Eno; Leo Abrahams
- Producers: David Byrne; Brian Eno; Leo Abrahams (additional production)

David Byrne and Brian Eno singles chronology
"The Jezebel Spirit" (1981)	"Strange Overtones" (2008)	"One Fine Day" (2009)

David Byrne singles chronology
"U.B. Jesus" (2001)	"Strange Overtones" (2008)	"Please Don't" (2009)

Brian Eno singles chronology
"Baby's on Fire" (2007)	"Strange Overtones" (2008)	"One Fine Day" (2009)

"Strange Overtones" is a song recorded by musicians David Byrne and Brian Eno, written by the duo with Leo Abrahams. It was released on August 4, 2008 by means of free download as the lead single from Byrne's and Eno's second collaborative studio album Everything That Happens Will Happen Today (2008). "Strange Overtones" is an uptempo electronic gospel song, and its lyrics explore the themes of humanity overcoming technology that are central to the album. "Strange Overtones" was well received by critics, and was downloaded 40,000 times in its first three days of release.

== Recording and release ==
While discussing the 2006 remix of My Life in the Bush of Ghosts at a dinner party, Eno suggested finishing some songs that he had written but that did not have lyrics. Byrne visited Eno's studio to listen to the demos and the two decided to collaborate to finish writing the songs. They continued working on the tracks in New York City and London, with regular e-mail correspondence to finish the composition. Multi-instrumentalist and previous Eno collaborator Leo Abrahams performed guitar, percussion instruments, and piano in his London home studio and played guitar with Byrne on one occasion. Abrahams would continue working on the tracks in his home studio through May 2008, with all collaborations being carried on via e-mail.

"Strange Overtones" is the first single off the album Everything That Happens Will Happen Today. The track was released for free on August 4, 2008, as a DRM-free MP3 available only through the album's website. This is part of the unorthodox Internet-based marketing scheme the two used to promote the album, inspired by the success of Radiohead's 2007 album In Rainbows and the self-promotional strategies of Nine Inch Nails for the albums Year Zero, Ghosts I–IV, and The Slip. In September 2008, YouTube user dogonaut created a music video for the song featuring paintings by Eno, using the short film "Beauty" by Jon Yeo.

A live recording of the song also appeared on Everything That Happens Will Happen on This Tour – David Byrne on Tour: Songs of David Byrne and Brian Eno, released on May 11, 2009. The song was also featured on the soundtrack album to Wall Street: Money Never Sleeps, along with several other David Byrne compositions.

In 2020, the song was covered by the indie rock group Whitney on their covers album, Candid.

== Composition ==
"Strange Overtones"
The final chorus of "Strange Overtones" discusses the themes of humanity and technology, illustrating the "electronic Gospel" genre of the album.

Eno has also said the album is about "paint[ing] a picture of the human trying to survive in an increasingly digital world;" themes that are explored in this song. "Strange Overtones" has been described as "a song about writing a song"—the subject of the song struggles to write innovative music, but is overheard by a neighbor using beats that are "twenty years old." In terms of the genre of music, both Byrne and Eno have called it "electronic Gospel"—the backing tracks are the kind of electronic music for which Eno is known, paired with hopeful and inspiring lyrics from Byrne— this song in particular features an uptempo backing track. Eno had been thinking about Gospel for several years, but couldn't write lyrics to hopeful songs.

Eno considers the album "[S]omething that combines something very human and fallible and personal, with something very electronic and mathematical sometimes." And they tried to "make that picture of the human still trying to survive in an increasingly complicated digital world... It's quite easy to make just digital music and it's quite easy to make just human music, but to try and make a combination is sort of, exciting, I think." Byrne considered his job as lyricist to "bring more humanity" to Eno's instrumentals, which can be "cold and academic."

== Reception ==
The song was downloaded over 40,000 times in its first three days of availability. One of the earliest reviews for "Strange Overtones" was on the August 11, 2008, episode of NPR's All Songs Considered. The Los Angeles Times called the track "intimate" and Stereogum echoed this by labeling it "warm"; it also received a positive review from Rolling Stone.

Pitchfork Media gave the song several adulations, including a positive review in their discussion of Everything That Happens Will Happen Today and naming the song number 11 track of 2008—including appearances on eight editors' end of the year lists—and placing number 297 on the Top 500 Tracks of the 2000s. Pitchfork also solicited the opinions of musicians for their favorite albums and songs of the year and The Watson Twins proclaimed "Strange Overtones" one of the best songs of 2008. KCMP's Top 89 of 2009 featured the song on two editor's lists. Mark Wheat of NPR named it one of the top 10 songs of 2009.

Ranking 60th for the year, this song was one of several from Everything That Happens Will Happen Today which appeared on The Village Voice's Pazz & Jop singles poll for 2008—"Life Is Long" placed 337, "My Big Nurse" was 350, "Everything That Happens" ended up at 748, and "I Feel My Stuff" reached 942. In addition, a vote was cast for "Strange Undertones".

== Personnel ==
- Leo Abrahams – guitars, bass guitar, Dubreq Stylophone, programming, co-production
- David Byrne – vocals, rhythm guitar, production, composition
- Brian Eno – backing vocals, organ solo, Omnichord piano, keyboards, programming, production, composition
- Steve Jones – delay guitar
- Mauro Refosco – bongo, conga, tambourine
- Seb Rochford – live drums
- Robert Wyatt – frame drum solo

== Chart performance ==
Chart (2008)	Peak position
US Adult Alternative Airplay (Billboard)	14

== See also ==
- Songs of David Byrne and Brian Eno Tour
- Ride, Rise, Roar
