= Everything That Happens Will Happen Today =

2008 studio album by David Byrne and Brian Eno

- Cover to the Compact Disc, digital, and vinyl versions of the album

Studio album by David Byrne and Brian Eno
- Released: August 18, 2008
- Recorded: Demoed by Eno in his London home studio through 2006, finished by Byrne and Leo Abrahams in their New York City and London home studios through 2008; additional instrumentation recorded at Cafe Music Studios and at Harder Sound in New York City.
- Genres: Electronic; art pop; folktronica; gospel
- Length: 47:16
- Label: Todo Mundo
- Producers: David Byrne; Brian Eno; Leo Abrahams (additional production)

David Byrne and Brian Eno chronology
| My Life in the Bush of Ghosts (1981) | Everything That Happens Will Happen Today (2008) |

David Byrne chronology
| David Byrne Live at Union Chapel (2004) | Everything That Happens Will Happen Today (2008) | Big Love: Hymnal (2008) |

Brian Eno chronology
| Beyond Even (1992–2006) (2008) | Everything That Happens Will Happen Today (2008) | Making Space (2010) |

Singles from Everything That Happens Will Happen Today
- 1. "Strange Overtones" Released: August 4, 2008; 2. "One Fine Day" Released: May 11, 2009

Everything That Happens Will Happen Today is the second collaborative album by David Byrne and Brian Eno, released on August 18, 2008, by Todo Mundo. It explores themes of humanity versus technology and optimism in spite of bleak circumstance through the blending of electronic and gospel music. Critical reception was largely positive and the album received awards for both the musical content as well as the packaging and technical production.

This album is the first joint effort between the two musicians since 1981's My Life in the Bush of Ghosts and Eno's work producing and co-writing with Talking Heads. Byrne and Eno worked on the tracks in their home studios throughout 2007 and early 2008 and sent digital copies of the recordings to one another over email. The single "Strange Overtones" was released free to promote the album and Byrne toured through 2008 and 2009, performing songs from this release as well as the duo's previous collaborations. This tour was documented with the live EP Everything That Happens Will Happen on This Tour – David Byrne on Tour: Songs of David Byrne and Brian Eno and the concert film Ride, Rise, Roar.

Everything That Happens Will Happen Today was released with a marketing strategy that involved Byrne creating the vanity label Todo Mundo and hiring Internet startup company Topspin Media to promote the album online using word-of-mouth and Internet sales to market the music. Several formats were created to allow users to have options on how to listen to the music—from free streaming audio to a deluxe package housed in a tin.

== Background ==
In December 2007, David Byrne announced on the BBC Radio music show The Weekender that he was working with his former collaborator Brian Eno on a brand new album of "proper songs", describing it as a "completely different" from the experimental My Life in the Bush of Ghosts. While the two were discussing the 2006 re-release of that album at a dinner party, Eno suggested adding lyrics and vocals to some of his unfinished songs, some of which were eight years old. The duo did not initially plan on making an entire album, but eventually felt confident enough to finish a full collection of songs. Although the two had discussed making an album together for several years, this was their first sincere effort since the early 1980s.

Byrne visited Eno's London studio to listen to the demos and the two decided to collaborate to finish writing the songs, leaving Eno and Peter Chilvers to convert a variety of digital music formats into MIDI, thereby stripping out extraneous information and making them suitable for Byrne to embellish. (Chilvers would be thanked in the liner notes for "Digital Archaeology".) The two continued to work on this and other musical projects for several months and agreed that if the project was not enjoyable, they would abandon it. The duo decided to not announce their new collaboration for fear that they may not complete an album's worth of new material, or that they would end up re-treading their previous collaborations and decide against releasing the new songs.

=== Composition ===
Eno had several musical compositions, but could not write lyrics to accompany them, whereas Byrne had several lyrics with no accompaniment. Eno wanted to make the vocals the "central event" of the music by pairing gospel singing with unexpected electronic music that also included elements of West African music. The songwriting's emphasis on vocals was partially inspired by Phillip Bimstein. In late 2007, Byrne took a compact disc of stereo mixes of the demos from Eno and spent a year trying to write lyrics to finish the songs, attempting to balance the simple chords that Eno had written with the more complex ones Byrne prefers. Although it was uncharacteristic for Eno, many of the songs were written on acoustic guitar, with the help of Steinberg Cubase. The musicians exchanged Eno's demos with the lyrics and vocal melodies completed by Byrne over e-mail and by June 2008, 14 songs had been recorded. Eno initially gave positive feedback, which encouraged Byrne to continue writing and only became critical as the project was finishing. Toward the end of the recording, Eno sent increasingly challenging tracks to see if Byrne could complete them—the final two ended up on the album as "I Feel My Stuff" and "Poor Boy".

At the outset, Byrne was hesitant to add lyrics to the tracks because they sounded too much like folk music. He characterized the process as very slow and full of trepidation, in part because of expectations from their previous collaboration and also due to the strict division of labor they had between writing instrumentation and vocalization. Eno only provided a few vocal demos and suggested simple changes like adding an extra verse. Byrne made minimal changes to the instrumentation on several tracks and avoided changing chords in the melody to suit his singing style. The duo only worked in the studio together on two occasions, including one full week and a weekend on another occasion and neither partner got a veto in the process of track selection or production. According to Byrne, the main challenge in this writing technique "was more emotional than technical: to write simple heartfelt tunes without drawing on cliché."

He later explained, "In a nutshell, Brian wrote most of the music, and I composed most of the vocal melodies and lyrics, and then sang them." If Byrne's vocal harmonies were radical enough, Eno would revise the instrumentation to accompany it, but Byrne avoided writing instrumentation and chose to adapt to the instrumentals as written. Using a style similar to the Talking Heads album Speaking in Tongues, Byrne scatted and murmured some lyrics before they were completed, due to Byrne's preference for the sonic quality of lyrics rather than their literal meaning and his method of writing lyrics using free association. In composing lyrics for the album, Byrne attempted to write keeping in mind what would please Eno as his collaborator. He also attempted to write harmonies for Eno, who decided against singing any lead vocals on the album. Eno does perform backing vocals throughout the album, which he credits on one track as "inhuman piano"

Both musicians continued to work on their own projects during the composition of Everything That Happens Will Happen Today. Byrne wrote the score for the second season of Big Love and completed his collaborations with Fatboy Slim on the album and musical Here Lies Love and the single "Toe Jam". Eno produced Coldplay's Viva la Vida or Death and All His Friends and U2's No Line on the Horizon. Byrne and Eno discussed the former's collaboration with Fatboy Slim and Chris Martin of Coldplay wrote lyrics to the instrumental track for "One Fine Day", but acquiesced when he heard Byrne's version (the band would also adapt another one of Eno's instrumental compositions that Byrne did not finish into a track on Viva la Vida). Once Byrne's version of "One Fine Day" was finished, the two began in earnest writing the rest of the tracks. Byrne initially had a long delay in writing material, but as the project progressed, he began working several hours a day on the album and put his collaboration with Fatboy Slim on hold to finish the songs in the early part of 2008. Since the two did not work together face-to-face as they had in the past, it was harder for them to complete material quickly, and they had to rush to finish two of the tracks at the end of the sessions. He later described the process as easy once details were sorted out and summed up this method as "pure joy" and declared writing collaboratively to be easier than writing solo. He even credited the time between their last collaboration and the transatlantic distance as a strength, since it allowed the two to keep their own schedules. Eno agreed, as it gave him time to focus on a small piece of music without holding up Byrne's progress. Byrne later used a similar approach through 2010 and 2011 in collaborations with St. Vincent (Love This Giant) and Will Oldham (the soundtrack to This Must Be the Place).

=== Themes ===
"Life Is Long" and electronic gospel
"Life Is Long"
The penultimate chorus of "Life Is Long" discusses spiritual themes and uses a gospel-style harmony along with electronic music composed and performed by Eno.

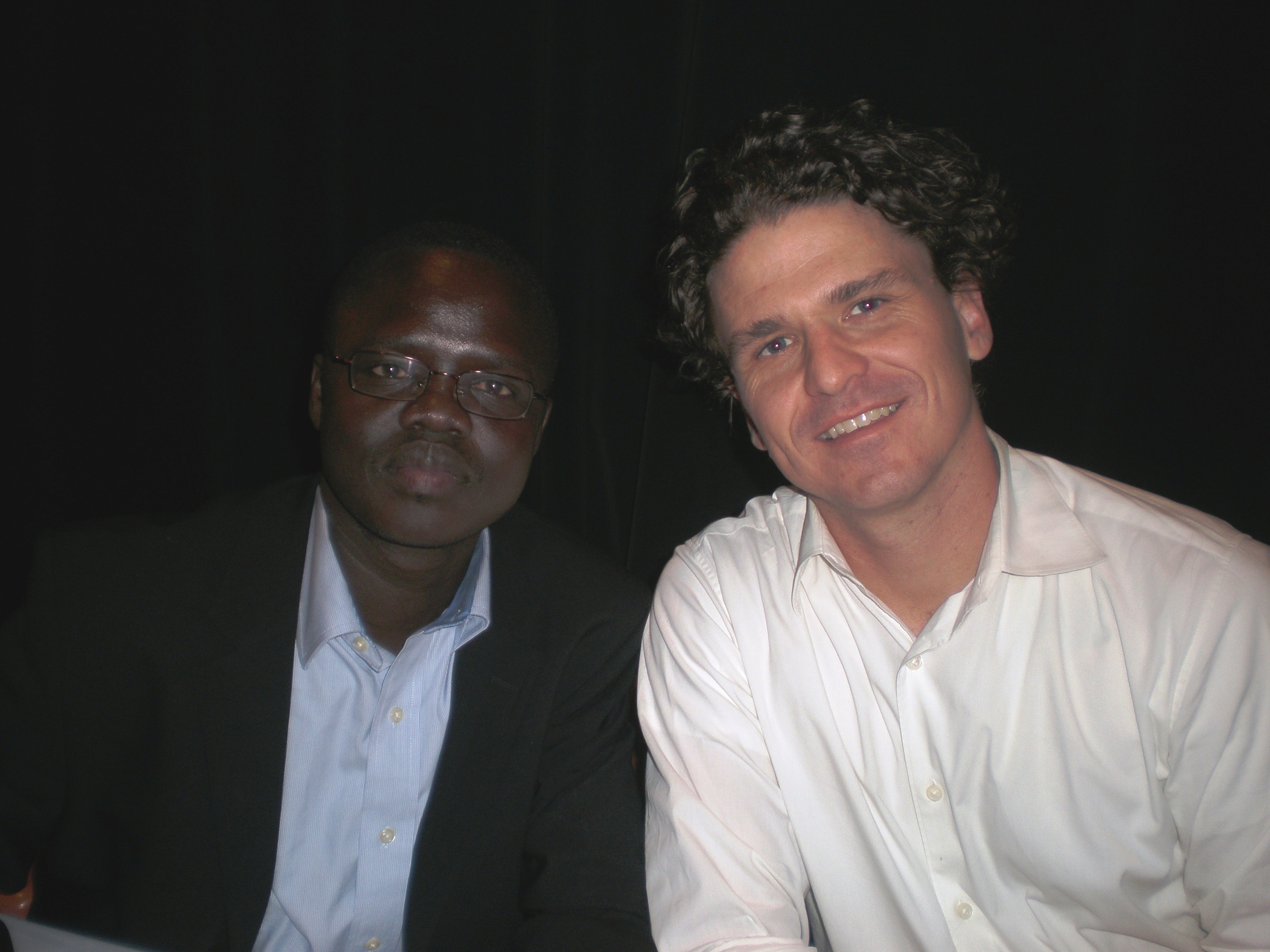
The story of Valentino Achak Deng (left)—as told by Dave Eggers (right) in the 2006 novel What Is the What: The Autobiography of Valentino Achak Deng—inspired Byrne to write hopeful lyrics.

The two were inspired by gospel music and both have described their music as "electronic gospel"—in particular the tracks "Life Is Long" and "One Fine Day". In addition to subtle Biblical themes in the lyrics, Eno was influenced by gospel musicality, which he initially discovered through Talking Heads while working on More Songs About Buildings and Food by listening to "Surrender to His Will" by Reverend Maceo Woods and The Christian Tabernacle Choir. For several years leading up to this project, Eno had primarily listened to gospel music—even joining a gospel choir—and was attracted to the music's unrestrained vocals and lack of pessimism as well as its inclusive nature. Eno had been thinking about gospel for several years, but could not write lyrics to hopeful songs.

While Byrne considers the music "[un]like any contemporary gospel record that you would hear out there," it is "informed by that feeling and those kind of lyrics, which allude to hope in the face of despair." Eno also considers the album "something that combines something very human and fallible and personal, with something very electronic and mathematical sometimes." The music combines electronic and gospel influences to "make that picture of the human still trying to survive in an increasingly complicated digital world... It's quite easy to make just digital music and it's quite easy to make just human music, but to try and make a combination is sort of, exciting, I think." Tracks such as "My Big Nurse" combine apocalypticism and comfort, blending hopefulness and despair.

The instrumental demos were primarily written in major chords, which Byrne considered slightly "ominous" and surprising from Eno. In spite of this, Byrne's lyrics ended up being hopeful and spiritual, with themes of redemption—what he considers "optimism in spite of the dread." The tension between optimism and pessimism and the spiritual themes quickly emerged over the course of a year in which Byrne was writing lyrics, which he has speculated might be an antidote to being "completely pessimistic and cynical about politics and the state of the world;" for instance, "The River" is about the effects of Hurricane Katrina. He has also cited the political climate of the Iraq War, the beginning of the late-2000s recession, the policies of the George W. Bush administration, and his 2004 divorce from Adelle Lutz as factors that inspired him to create uplifting music. As he explained, "I was surprised that's what came out... The tracks are very different from what I would have done myself. I lean toward things that are more complicated." Eno also thinks the album is much better than the songs he imagined when composing them solo.

Eno has also said the album is about "paint[ing] a picture of the human trying to survive in an increasingly digital world" and Byrne considered his job as lyricist to "bring more humanity" to Eno's instrumentals, which can be "cold and academic." Themes of humanity struggling with technology are apparent on several tracks and Byrne has characterized the "overall vibe" of the album as "We're going to get through this. Humanity will prevail." The lyrical content includes "a sinister inflection" but "many songs feel fairly uplifting and the overall tone is hopeful." Byrne focused on mundane events and attempted to write in a style that was "simple but not corny, basic but heartfelt." His inspiration in writing lyrics for "One Fine Day" was the story of Valentino Achak Deng as told in Dave Eggers' What Is the What—the two are thanked in the liner notes and Byrne had previously performed at a fundraiser for Eggers' 826 Valencia. The story of the Lost Boys of Sudan is emblematic of the spiritual themes of the album as they go through "all kinds of unrelenting horrors, but [are] eternally hopeful and even cheerful, in a way that defies all logic." The music on this album also expresses homesickness—a lyrical trend that is apparent in Byrne's work with Talking Heads.

=== Production ===
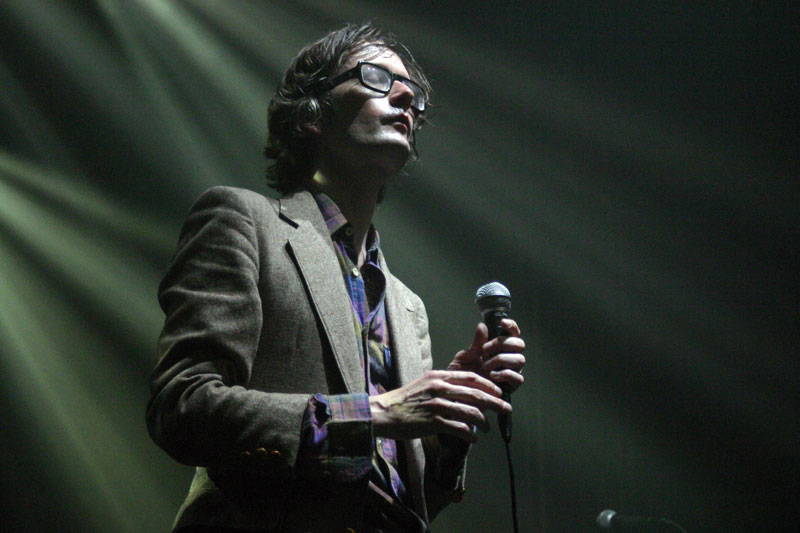
Jarvis Cocker—pictured here performing in 2008—was brought in to play uncredited guitar on Everything That Happens Will Happen Today.

By March 2008, the duo had recruited Seb Rochford to play drums with Byrne in New York City. Later that month, multi-instrumentalist and previous Eno collaborator Leo Abrahams was enlisted to perform guitar, percussion instruments, and piano in his London home studio. Abrahams and Rochford would continue working on the tracks in Abrahams' studio through May and their work was e-mailed to other collaborators—Byrne attended one session to play guitar. Other musicians worked with Byrne in New York City and Eno in London, such as frequent Byrne collaborator Mauro Refosco, Eno's daughters Darla and Irial, and Jarvis Cocker of Pulp, who added uncredited guitar in London. The duo attempted to record as much of the music from home studios as possible and played almost all instrumentation themselves, saving the drums and percussion for the studio. In addition to the tracks that were released, the musicians had some other instrumentals that Byrne did not complete.

Speaking at an April 2008 event in New York, Byrne confirmed the release of a new album, calling it a "record of sung songs" in contrast to the experimental music from My Life in the Bush of Ghosts and later told the New York Daily News that "Brian had written a lot of music, but needed some words, which I know how to do. What's it sound like? Electronic gospel. That's all I'm saying." Eno also explained the differences between this album and their previous one saying, "[T]his is quite different from My Life in that the intention of that album was to not use our voices at all, but instead to find voices and stick them on to the music. This new one is different—these are songs written and sung by David... They go from electronic folk gospel to quite indefinable areas of music."

Throughout the middle of the year, Abrahams recorded drums at his home studio and Cherif Hashizume recorded more at Cafe Music Studios, while Robert Harder at Harder Sound recorded the drums on "My Big Nurse", "Never Thought", "The Painting", and "Life Is Long". Abrahams collected all of the recordings to have them mixed and Byrne booked tour dates in anticipation of completing the album. Mixing continued through June 2008 in New York by previous Byrne collaborator Patrick Dillett at Kampo Studios, who recorded brass and percussion. They e-mailed the mixes to Eno for final approval and sent the finalized audio to Greg Calbi at Sterling Sound for mastering. On July 28, 2008, details of the album became public knowledge when Byrne posted on his blog that he and Eno had finished the new album and it would be released on August 18. The album website was launched on the same day, with a promotional video of Byrne introducing the new album.

=== Design ===
Designer Stefan Sagmeister was inspired by the music to create a domestic scene with a "dark edge", such as this roof with a discarded condom wrapper in the gutter.

The physical releases of the album came with graphics and packaging designed by Stefan Sagmeister with Richard The, Joe Shouldice, and Jared Stone; illustration by Stephan Walter; and production by Gamil Design. Sagmeister had earlier received a Best Boxed or Special Limited Edition Package Grammy in 2005 for art direction on the Talking Heads' Once in a Lifetime box set and also designed the cover to Byrne's Feelings. This album would also win a Grammy in 2010 for Best Record Packaging and was additionally recognized by Creative Review.

His inspiration for the packaging was based on the song "Home" and the artwork reflects an urban scene of a house by a roadside; the liner notes provide closeups on the home and the artwork on the Compact Disc is the grass from the lawn. Sagmeister proceeded to create not only an image for the cover, but an entire three-dimensional model for the house, which was later released as the deluxe edition packaging. Upon repeated listenings to the album, he became convinced that there was a sinister element to the setting and provided clues to the "dark edge" of the scene, such as a discarded condom wrapper in the gutter, a man looking out the window with binoculars, and a gasoline canteen in the kitchen.

The deluxe package comes in a tin with a microchip that plays a sound of someone walking down a hallway in the house and slamming a door when the package is opened. The urban themes of the packaging are expanded in this edition, with the album entitled "Stick" and the bonus content "Rock"; discs are designed to look like they are covered in grass. This design of a pixelated, dimetric projection domestic scene has been compared to The Sims.

== Release ==
The album was self-released on August 18, 2008, exclusively through the album's website. It was made available there free for streaming and for purchase as a download of DRM-free MP3s. The duo released the album from other online digital music services starting the following month, including 7digital, Amazon MP3, eMusic, the iTunes Store, Napster, and the Zune Marketplace. No record label was involved in releasing the digital format and independent distributors were allowed to handle the physical product, which was released on November 25 as an enhanced CD and a deluxe-packaged CD in a tin.

"Strange Overtones" and themes of humanity versus technology
"Strange Overtones"
The final chorus of "Strange Overtones" discusses the themes of humanity and technology, illustrating the "electronic gospel" genre of the album with its lyrics about the strength of the heart.

=== Formats and release history ===
Initially, three distinct versions of the album were released:

- Digital only – as 320 kbit/s MP3s, with a 17-page PDF digital booklet designed by Stefan Sagmeister.
- Digital album with CD – everything included above as well as an Enhanced CD; initial orders were mailed to customers by November 30, 2008.
- Deluxe CD – everything from both packages above as well as a bonus disc with four exclusive songs, a short film about the album directed by Hillman Curtis, and a screensaver. The discs were housed in a three-dimensional version of the packaging that also contained expanded liner notes, a die with obscure phrases such as "A Dirty Bird" and "The Human Brain" printed on it, and a red and white capsule fit for human consumption. Delays caused this version to be shipped in December 2008.

In addition, buyers were entitled to lossless FLAC versions of the album at no extra cost. By mid-December 2008, 12 percent of customers chose to download the FLAC option.

This album is catalogued as the second release from Byrne's vanity label Todo Mundo after Big Love: Hymnal; copies of the CD were marked CD-TODO-002. The CD was released in Japan with a bonus track—"Poor Boy" (Eno & Leo Abrahams Remix)—and obi strip in November 2008 through Beat Records with catalogue number BRC-218. On February 17, 2009, the album was released on 180-gram vinyl LP as LP-TODO-002.

=== Singles ===
The first single off the album—"Strange Overtones"—was released on August 4, 2008, as a free digital download available only through the album's website. The track has been described as "a song about writing a song" and features thematic elements of humanity versus technology that are explored throughout the album. It was downloaded over 40,000 times within the first three days it was available. In September 2008, Jon Yeo created a music video for the track featuring the paintings of Brian Eno. In May 2009, the song was replaced by "One Fine Day" as a free download to promote the EP Everything That Happens Will Happen on This Tour – David Byrne on Tour: Songs of David Byrne and Brian Eno.

== Reception ==
Professional ratings
Aggregate scores
| Source | Rating |
|---|---|
| Metacritic | 75/100 |
Review scores
| Source | Rating |
| The A.V. Club | B+ |
| AllMusic | 3.5/5 stars |
| Entertainment Weekly | A− |
| Paste | 75/100 |
| Pitchfork | 7.6/10 |
| PopMatters | 8/10 |
| Rolling Stone | 4/5 stars |
| Spin | 3/5 stars |
| The Times | 3/5 stars |

According to the review aggregator Metacritic, Everything That Happens Will Happen Today received "generally favorable reviews" based on a weighted average score of 75 out of 100 from 24 critic scores. Positive reviews have emphasized the pop songcraft on the album, calling it "exceedingly pleasant" (Billboard) and "vibrant" (Tucson Weekly). Writing for the BBC, Chris Jones summed up the album by saying that it would not break any musical boundaries, but listeners will find music that was "intriguingly and, sometimes, maddeningly infectious."

The music has been compared to the tone of alternative rock bands such as Radiohead, the Flaming Lips, and R.E.M.'s 1998 album Up. Furthermore, Barry Walters of Spin has compared the music to former Eno collaborators U2 and several reviewers have compared the musicality to Paul Simon—especially his 2006 Eno collaboration Surprise. The vocals have been declared similar to Neil Young; and the arrangement has been compared to The Beach Boys. Although the music was informed by gospel and digital music, comparisons have been made with genres as diverse as country due to the vocal delivery and old school hip hop. One weakness addressed by several reviewers is the unoriginality of the music, especially in comparison to the duo's previous collaborations.

Contrasting Everything That Happens Will Happen Today with My Life in the Bush of Ghosts, some have found a connection between the two. Reviewers have found similarities in Eno's solo album Another Green World and the Eno-produced Talking Heads albums Fear of Music and Remain in Light, as well as Little Creatures, which was produced by the band. This is partly due to the unique use of technology in the creation of all of the albums associated with Eno. Other commentators have emphasized the differences between the two projects. For instance, The Age's Bernard Zuel considers these expectations built by the earlier work to be "unfair... and inaccurate." The Observer review by Kitty Empire labels this album "conservative" and John Doran of The Quietus calls it "less exciting"—Erie Times-News reviewer Dr. Rock goes as far as to call it an "antithesis" to Bush of Ghosts. In particular, the experimental nature of the former has been contrasted with the pop music style of this album and the lack of African beats and world music. Audra Schroeder of The Austin Chronicle noted "Thirty years after first collaborating on the Talking Heads, these two don't have to mine the past since there's nothing that remarkable about Everything." Francis Jones summed up his review for Hot Press by concluding "No boundaries were harmed in its making but ETHWHT is an album of unquestionably great songs" and Louise Gray of New Internationalist declared that, "it's not got the edgy, funky bricolage that characterized the earlier album and nor does it seek that." At the same time, other reviewers have found the break with the experimental nature of My Life in the Bush of Ghosts to be positive. Jim DeRogatis from the Chicago Sun-Times observed:

"[E]ven 27 years ago, there was nothing all that original or appealing about an ethnologically-minded mix of various world rhythms and random vocal snippets captured via shortwave radio. Anyone who claims these boys invented sampling clearly never heard Can or musique concrete. Right off the bat, Everything That Happens Will Happen Today is a much more accessible, enjoyable and arguably better album than My Life in the Bush of Ghosts--at least if you care about conventional pop/rock songcraft."

Reviews have emphasized the contrast between optimism and foreboding on the album, as well as the struggle of humanity against technology. In addition, several reviewers have noted parallels between this album and Byrne's Big Love: Hymnal, particularly their common spiritual themes and atmospheric moods. Resident Advisor's review also notes the shift in Eno's recordings toward more gospel vocals. Steve Matteo of Crawdaddy! wrote that Eno's production dominates the album, whereas Filter's Ken Scrudato considers the album primarily a David Byrne venture. Consequence of Sound's review notes continuity between this album and Byrne's 2004 release Grown Backwards, while The Village Voice has declared this album "more expansive and adventurous" than anything else Byrne has released in decades and Greg Kot of The Chicago Tribune wrote that the album features "one of the strongest vocal performances of Byrne's career."

=== Awards ===
The album was nominated for three Grammy Awards—Best Alternative Music Album, Best Recording Package, and Best Boxed or Special Limited Edition Package—on December 2, 2008. On February 8, 2009, designer Stefan Sagmeister won the award for Best Recording Package at the 51st Annual Grammy Awards. The deluxe edition packaging was given a bronze medal by the Art Directors Club of New York. The album was nominated for a Technical Excellence & Creativity Award in the Record Production/Album category.

Several year-end lists included the album amongst the best releases of 2008:

Year-end accolades for Everything That Happens Will Happen Today
| Publisher | Accolade | Year | Rank |
|---|---|---|---|
| ABC News | The 50 Best Albums of 2008 | 2009 | 46 |
| AllMusic | AllMusic's Favorite Rock Albums of 2008 | 2008 | Unranked, out of 25 |
| Amazon.com editors' picks | Amazon Music: Best of 2008 | 2009 | 62 |
| The Buffalo News | Best Albums (2000–2010) | 2010 | Honorable mention |
| Chicago Sun-Times (Jim DeRogatis) | The Best Albums of 2008 | 2008 | 2 |
| Chicago Tribune (Greg Kot) | Top Albums of 2008 | 2008 | 10 |
| Magnet | Magnet's Top 25 Albums of 2008 | 2008 | 25 |
| No Ripcord | Top 50 Albums of 2008 | 2008 | 38 |
| Pitchfork Media | The 50 Best Albums of 2008 | 2008 | 41 |
| Rolling Stone | Best Albums of 2008 | 2008 | 42 |
| Rough Trade | Albums of the Year | 2008 | 37 |
| Seattle Weekly | What We Listened to in 2009 | 2009 | Unranked, out of 13 artists |
| Uncut | Top 50 of 2008 | 2008 | 48 |
| The Village Voice | Pazz & Jop 2008 Albums | 2008 | 29 |
| The Word | Top Albums of 2008 | 2009 | 10 |

DeRogatis' and Kot's reviews were featured on Sound Opinions and the album was also placed on two individual writers' lists for No Ripcord's best of the year. Two contributors to No Depression included the album on their best-of lists for 2008. The A.V. Club commissioned celebrities to give their picks for album of the year and Tim Heidecker chose this album, describing it as "the most interesting and listenable pop record of the year, in my book." The Fader's 2008 year in review named this one of the "Top Twelve Albums That We Thought Would Have a Bigger Impact On Our Lives", but later declared the album "career-defining." The publication dedicated their annual icon issue to Byrne in 2009 in part due to the success of this album.

Several songs from this album appeared on The Village Voice's Pazz & Jop singles poll for 2008—"Strange Overtones" came in at 60, "Life Is Long" placed 337, "My Big Nurse" was 350, "Everything That Happens" ended up at 748, and "I Feel My Stuff" reached 942. In addition, a vote was cast for "Strange Undertones".

=== Sales figures and chart performance ===
Although the artists have not released sales figures, they have indicated that the album was purchased across the globe during the first 24 hours it was available and that the servers hosting the album delivered "several terabytes" by September 6. A report in late December asserted that they had sold "nearly 20,000 downloads." In March 2009, Ian C. Rogers of Topspin Media explained that 20 percent of those who listened to the album streaming chose to purchase it and 30 percent of them included a physical copy of the CD; trends that would hold through September of that year. By October 2008, Byrne explained that they had recouped their losses on the album and that sales had "paid back the recording costs and costs for building the Web site." He would later explain that this business model worked well for established acts as well as smaller bands, due to minimal production and distribution costs. Their business model also allowed them to self-release and plan a tour immediately after finishing the music production, rather than wait months for record label advancement.

The album did not chart until it was physically released—a development which surprised Byrne. In the first week of December, Everything That Happens Will Happen Today reached the top spot on the College Music Journal AAA charts and third on the CMJ Radio 200. The album entered the Billboard 200 for the week of January 17, 2009, debuting at 182 with 4,008 copies sold. It peaked the following week at 174 before dropping off the charts. It was on the Independent Albums chart for 10 weeks, reaching 18.

Byrne's 2012 book How Music Works gives a more thorough breakdown of the album's sales and distribution. By the time of publication, he claims to have sold 160,000 copies of the album, making a little over $300,000 in sales:

The $59,850 cost of making this record was only part of what it cost to prepare it for market. All told, the total costs to self-release the album were $315,000—building the website, paying for servers, design fees, promotion, manufacturing, etc. That's a lot more than any indie band could ever afford. We wound up generating $964,000 in total income. So minus the $315,000 in expenses, that left us with $649,000, 50 percent of which went to Eno, leaving me with $324,500. Since we were the record company, we paid our own mechanicals out of our profit. I was elated. Here, finally, was the future. I made $324,500 on this "self-distributed" record, compared to the $58,000 I made on the standard royalty-deal record Grown Backwards—and the two sold nearly the same number of copies: 140,000 for Grown Backwards, and 160,000 for Everything That Happens. Wow, the writing is on the wall here! Well, that enthusiasm might be justified if you can afford the $315,000 that we paid to assemble the apparatus needed to make, sell, and market a record. (It should be pointed out that some of those costs were start-up, learning-as-you go costs. Presumably they wouldn't be as high down the road, as the infrastructure has been built.)

2008 sales chart performance for Everything That Happens Will Happen Today
| Region | Sales charts (2008) | Peak position |
|---|---|---|
| France | Syndicat National de l'Édition Phonographique | 127 |
| United Kingdom | UK Albums Chart | 153 |

2009 sales chart performance for Everything That Happens Will Happen Today
| Region | Sales charts (2009) | Peak position |
|---|---|---|
| Australia | ARIA Albums Chart | 66 |
| Belgium | Belgian (Wallonian) Albums Chart | 58 |
| New Zealand | Official New Zealand Music Chart | 31 |
| United States | US Billboard 200 | 174 |

== Promotion ==
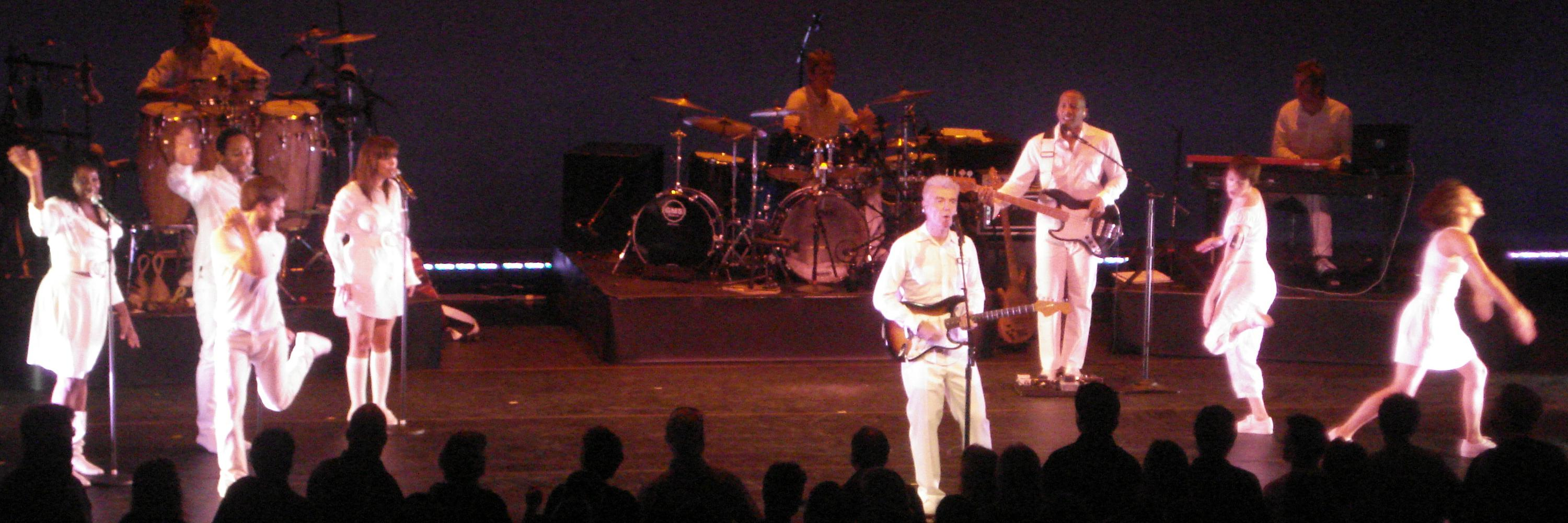
Performers from the Songs of David Byrne and Brian Eno Tour on the opening night—September 16, 2008—at the Zoellner Arts Center–Baker Hall in Bethlehem, Pennsylvania. (Left to right): Back: Mauro Refosco (percussion), Graham Hawthorne (drums), and Mark De Gli Antoni (keyboards) Middle: Kaïssa (background vocals), Redray Frazier (background vocals), Jenni Muldaur (background vocals), and Paul Frazier (bass guitar) Front: Steven Reker (dancing), Byrne (vocals and guitar), Natalie Kuhn (dancing), and Lily Baldwin (dancing)

While Byrne and Eno did a few interviews for the album and subsequent tour, the two attempted to market the album via word-of-mouth and Internet hype rather than a traditional marketing scheme. Eno was convinced in part because of his own preferences for digital music from the iTunes Store rather than CDs as well as the success of Radiohead's 2007 album In Rainbows and the self-promotional strategies of Nine Inch Nails for the albums Year Zero, Ghosts I–IV, and The Slip. Byrne was also impressed by Radiohead's release strategy as a means of valuing music. The duo carefully avoided Internet leaks by not giving out promotional copies of the album to journalists, but Byrne did preview the song "One Fine Day" prior to the release by performing it with a choir of senior citizens and Eno invited Mark Coles for the BBC World Service program The Beat to his home to listen to the songs on Eno's laptop. In 2017, Byrne revealed that he and Eno had collaborated again on Byrne's next solo album.

In 2010, several of the songs from this album—"Home", "I Feel My Stuff", "Life Is Long", "My Big Nurse", and "Strange Overtones"—were included in the Todo Mundo soundtrack album to the film Wall Street: Money Never Sleeps along with other David Byrne songs.

=== Marketing ===
Byrne and Eno have both expressed their displeasure with the music industry and traditional models of marketing music, with Eno calling the music business an "exciting mess" and saying:

"The music industry... were selling [physical products, such as CDs] quite expensively actually, that fostered a generally quite lazy attitude within record companies... Suddenly now we have a quite different situation which it seems to me, artists understand much better than record companies do... [Y]oung artists are very comfortable with starting their careers on Facebook or MySpace or something like that—and they're way ahead of the record companies in some respects."

Byrne has written for Wired, outlining the relative merits of different distribution models with this one reflecting his "self-distribution model" in which "the artist stands to receive the largest percentage of income from sales per unit—sales of anything. A larger percentage of fewer sales, most likely, but not always. Artists doing it for themselves can actually make more money than the massive pop star, even though the sales numbers may seem minuscule by comparison." The motivation for creating and marketing this album directly came in part from the very article Byrne wrote as well as Eno's belief that music fans want more than just the music on an album and prefer collectible deluxe editions as well as the live performances that promote them. A month after releasing the album, Byrne was skeptical of market saturation claiming "I sense that a lot of people don't know we have a record out" and hoped to counterbalance that ignorance with his tour. He also described the digital music market as "so infinite [that] it's easy for music to get lost out there" and has noted that this business model would not work for performers who are not already established.

The duo enlisted a music marketing startup company—Topspin Media—to design their site, delivery options for the digital music, and promotional web widgets. Like the entirety of the recording process, the marketing was self-financed and controlled by the artists, with Topspin taking a portion of the money made from digital sales. This allowed the artists to control creative aspects of producing music as well as the overhead costs associated with marketing an album. The company used viral marketing techniques to collect potential customers' e-mail addresses and encourage them to post the album streaming on their blogs. By early November, the collected e-mail addresses amounted to 37 percent of the album sales. Topspin has also created a Flickr pool encouraging users to upload screenshots of the widget posted to web sites. No advertisements were taken out for the album.

Byrne and Eno were praised by Fast Company for their innovative use of Internet marketing and distribution for this album as well as several other releases and the promotion of this album has been lauded as a way of undermining copyright infringement. Key to their success was the software that Topspin Media developed and later commercially released as a bundle for other companies and artists to use, explaining that "In the first eight weeks following the launch of the David Byrne and Brian Eno self-released record, Everything That Happens Will Happen Today, the Topspin platform helped us generate Direct-to-Fan revenue at the very least the equivalent to what we would have expected from a label advance," that went directly to Byrne and Eno. Based in part on the success of marketing this album, representatives of Topspin were invited to teach a course on music marketing at Berklee College of Music in September 2009 and Ian C. Rogers led a panel discussion at South by Southwest on options for independent music artists. The album's multiple formats have been praised as a method of incentivizing buying physical copies of albums.

=== Songs of David Byrne and Brian Eno Tour ===
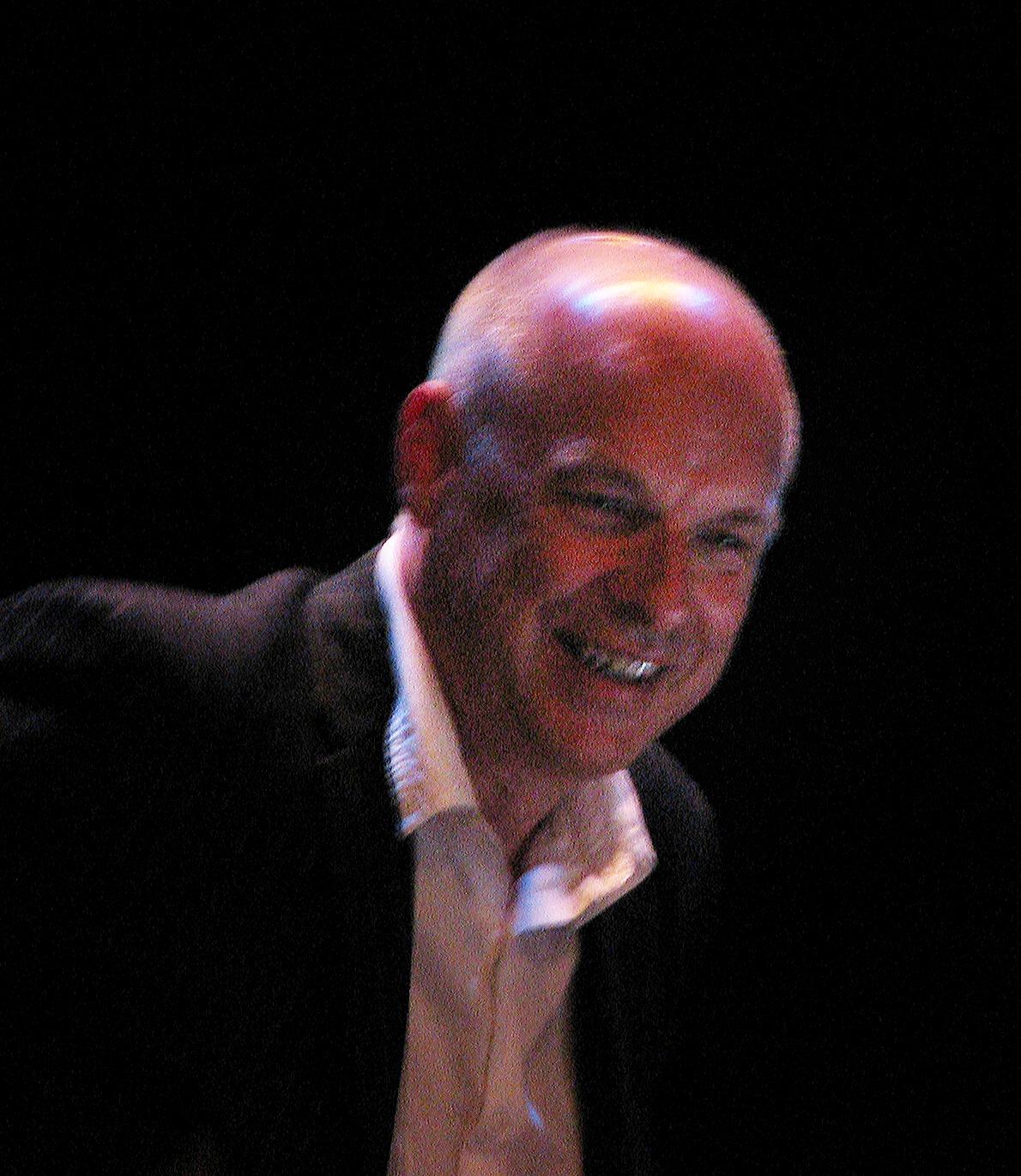
Eno was rumored to participate in the Songs of David Byrne and Brian Eno Tour, but only appeared onstage once for a brief cameo.

Byrne assembled a band to tour for the album, performing music throughout the latter half of 2008 and early 2009 across North America, Europe, and Australasia. He hired more singers than he had on previous tours to reproduce the complex vocal harmonies of the album and was inspired to bring along dancers after seeing Sufjan Stevens promote the album Illinois as well as the Japanese films Funky Forest and The Taste of Tea. Byrne was initially uninvolved in the choreography, but made more suggestions as the tour went on and after he saw a live performance by Deerhoof that incorporated dancing with instruments. He began booking tour dates before the album was completed and continued writing his book The Bicycle Diaries throughout the tour.

In planning the set lists for the tour, Byrne initially considered only promoting this album but decided to include songs from his previous collaborations with Eno as well, including the Talking Heads albums More Songs About Buildings and Food, Fear of Music, and Remain in Light and Byrne's The Catherine Wheel soundtrack. By playing music from all of their collaborations, Byrne hoped to "draw a line linking this new material with what we did 30 years ago" with the goal of clarifying the connection between all of the duo's previous work. In reviewing their past music, he found that "[t]here might be more continuity than I imagined, which I hope is going to work in my favor." Although Eno was invited to participate and early reports indicated that he would, Eno ultimately chose not to tour with Byrne, letting Byrne decide how to present this music live.

=== Everything That Happens Will Happen on This Tour ===
On May 11, 2009, the live EP Everything That Happens Will Happen on This Tour – David Byrne on Tour: Songs of David Byrne and Brian Eno was released digitally through Todo Mundo to benefit Amnesty International. The album features four songs recorded in December 2008 on the tour. Topspin Media offered the same digital download options to purchase the EP and the company created a second embeddable media player to promote the album.

=== Ride, Rise, Roar ===
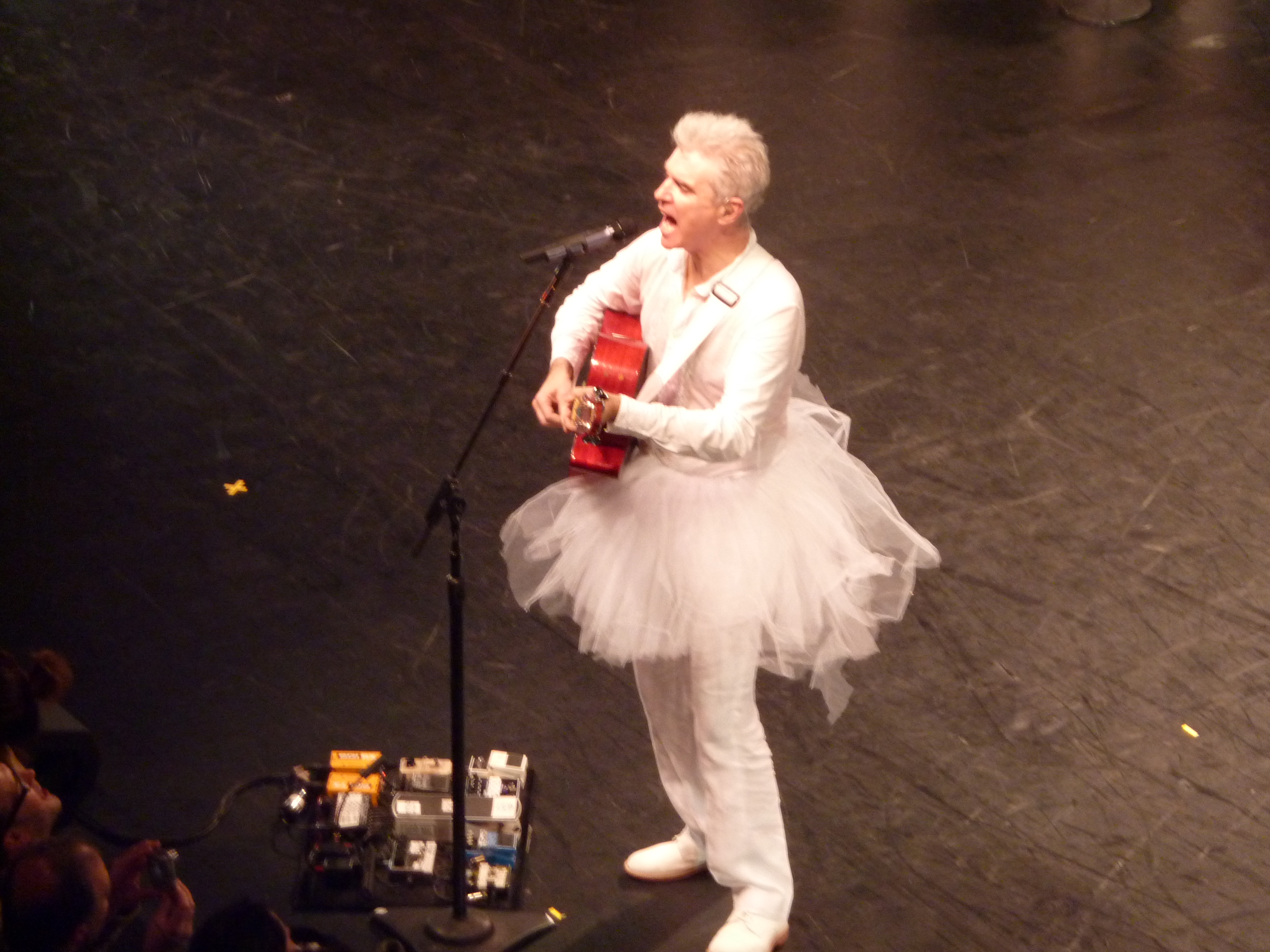
The performances on the Songs of David Byrne and Brian Eno Tour included matching costumes, such as the white jumpsuit and tutu that Byrne is wearing here.

On February 11, 2010, it was announced that a documentary film entitled Ride, Rise, Roar chronicling the tour would be released to the 2010 film festival circuit. The debut was at South by Southwest on March 15, 2010, where it was screened in all three media categories—film, interactive, and music. Byrne attended some British screenings for question and answer sessions.

Ride, Rise, Roar is the feature-length directorial debut by Hillman Curtis—Byrne approached him after his satisfaction with the short film that accompanies the deluxe edition of Everything That Happens Will Happen Today. The documentary includes concert footage, film of the planning and rehearsals for the tour, and exclusive interviews with Byrne, Eno, and the supporting musicians and dancers. Curtis was initially contacted to document the tour with no clear objective for the film and decided to focus on the collaboration between Byrne and his tour mates as well as the unique challenge of combining popular music with modern dance.

== Track listing ==
All lyrics written by David Byrne; all music by Byrne (vocal melodies) and Brian Eno (instrumentation), except "Strange Overtones" co-written by Leo Abrahams.

1. "Home" – 5:06
2. "My Big Nurse" – 3:21
3. "I Feel My Stuff" – 6:25
4. "Everything That Happens" – 3:46
5. "Life Is Long" – 3:45
6. "The River" – 2:30
7. "Strange Overtones" – 4:17
8. "Wanted for Life" – 5:06
9. "One Fine Day" – 4:55
10. "Poor Boy" – 4:19
11. "The Lighthouse" – 3:46

Japanese release

12. "Poor Boy" (Eno & Leo Abrahams Remix) – 3:51

Deluxe Edition bonus tracks

1. "Never Thought" – 4:08
2. "Walking Along the River" – 4:38
3. "The Eyes" – 3:29
4. "The Painting" – 4:33

== Personnel ==
"Home"

- Leo Abrahams – acoustic guitars, percussion
- David Byrne – vocals, guitar solo
- Brian Eno – bass guitar, backing vocals, electric drums, Kaoss Pad, keyboards, guitars
- Seb Rochford – live drums

"My Big Nurse"

- Leo Abrahams – acoustic and electric guitar, piano, percussion
- David Byrne – vocals
- Brian Eno – guitar, organ, Steinberg virtual guitar, electric guitar
- Steve Jones (musician) – fast pulls guitar
- Seb Rochford – live drums

"I Feel My Stuff"

- Leo Abrahams – guitar, solo guitar
- David Byrne – vocals
- Brian Eno – bass guitars, electric drums, "inhuman piano" vocalizations, guitar, keyboards, brass, backing vocals, traps
- Tim Harries – melody bass
- Phil Manzanera – drone guitar
- Seb Rochford – live drums

"Everything That Happens"

- Leo Abrahams – piano, coin guitar
- David Byrne – vocals
- Brian Eno – bass guitar, keyboards, water guitars, stellar voice

"Life Is Long"

- Leo Abrahams – guitar, upright piano, percussion
- David Byrne – vocals
- Barry Danielian – brass
- Brian Eno – bass guitar, backing vocals, strings, programming, Omnichord piano, guitar
- Steve Jones – rhythm guitar
- Dan Levine – brass and arrangement
- Dave Mann – brass
- Paul Shapiro – brass

"The River"

- Leo Abrahams – hurdy-gurdy, baritone guitar
- David Byrne – vocals
- Brian Eno – guitars, bass guitar, keyboards, backing vocals
- Mauro Refosco – murky pandeiro, cricket shaker, reco reco, peddler's rattle

"Strange Overtones"

- Leo Abrahams – guitars, bass guitar, Dubreq Stylophone, programming
- David Byrne – vocals, rhythm guitar
- Brian Eno – backing vocals, organ solo, Omnichord piano, keyboards, programming
- Steve Jones – delay guitar
- Mauro Refosco – bongo, conga, tambourine
- Seb Rochford – live drums
- Robert Wyatt – frame drum solo

"Wanted for Life"

- Leo Abrahams – guitars, bass guitar, backing vocals, percussion
- David Byrne – vocals
- Barry Danielian – treated brass
- Brian Eno – bass guitar, backing vocals, snout keyboard, guitar, electric drums
- Dan Levine – treated brass
- Dave Mann – treated brass
- Seb Rochford – live drums
- Paul Shapiro – treated brass

"One Fine Day"

- Leo Abrahams – acoustic guitar, bass guitar
- David Byrne – vocals
- Brian Eno – bass guitar, backing vocals, Steinberg virtual guitar, electric guitars, programming
- Steve Jones – melody guitar
- Mauro Refosco – zabumba, cahon, tamborim, conga, shaker
- Seb Rochford – live drums

"Poor Boy"

- Leo Abrahams – high bass
- David Byrne – vocals, guitars
- Brian Eno – bass guitar, electric drums, programming, guitars, keyboards, brass
- Seb Rochford – live drums

"The Lighthouse"

- Leo Abrahams – bass guitar, thunder guitar
- David Byrne – vocals, guitars, ebow guitars, clavinet, piano, surdu, percussion
- Brian Eno – bass guitar, guitar treatments, keys, programming
- Seb Rochford – live drums

"Never Thought"

- Leo Abrahams – ebow, acoustic guitar, piano, percussion
- David Byrne – vocals, ebow guitars
- Brian Eno – bass guitar, lead and rhythm guitars, programming, "inhuman piano" vocalizations, backing vocals
- Melanie Hall QC – female backing vocals
- Robert Wyatt – Handsonic drum

"Walking Along the River"

- David Byrne – vocals, piano
- Brian Eno – bass guitar, electric guitars, keyboards, electric drums, Omnichord piano, percussion, backing vocals
- Darla Eno – vocals
- Irial Eno – vocals
- Seb Rochford – live drums

"The Eyes"

- Leo Abrahams – reverse guitars, bass guitar
- David Byrne – vocals
- Brian Eno – guitars, keys, Omnichord piano, piano, backing vocals

"The Painting"

- Leo Abrahams – guitars, bass guitar, glockenspiel, solo guitar
- David Byrne – vocals
- Brian Eno – guitar, shakers, programming, keys
- Mauro Refosco – zabumba, timbal
- Seb Rochford – live drums

Other

- Greg Calbi – mastering at Sterling Sound, New York City
- Jarvis Cocker – guitar
- Patrick Dillett – mixing, live brass and percussion recording at Kampo Studios, New York City
- Robert Harder – live drum recording at Harder Sound
- Cherif Hashizume – live drum recording at Cafe Music Studios
- Sagmeister, Inc. – design
- Stephan Walter – illustration

== See also ==
- 2008 in music
- More Songs About Buildings and Food (1978)
- Fear of Music (1979)
- Remain in Light (1980)
- My Life in the Bush of Ghosts (1981)
- The Catherine Wheel (1981)
