= Hillman Curtis =

American designer, musician and filmmaker (1961–2012)

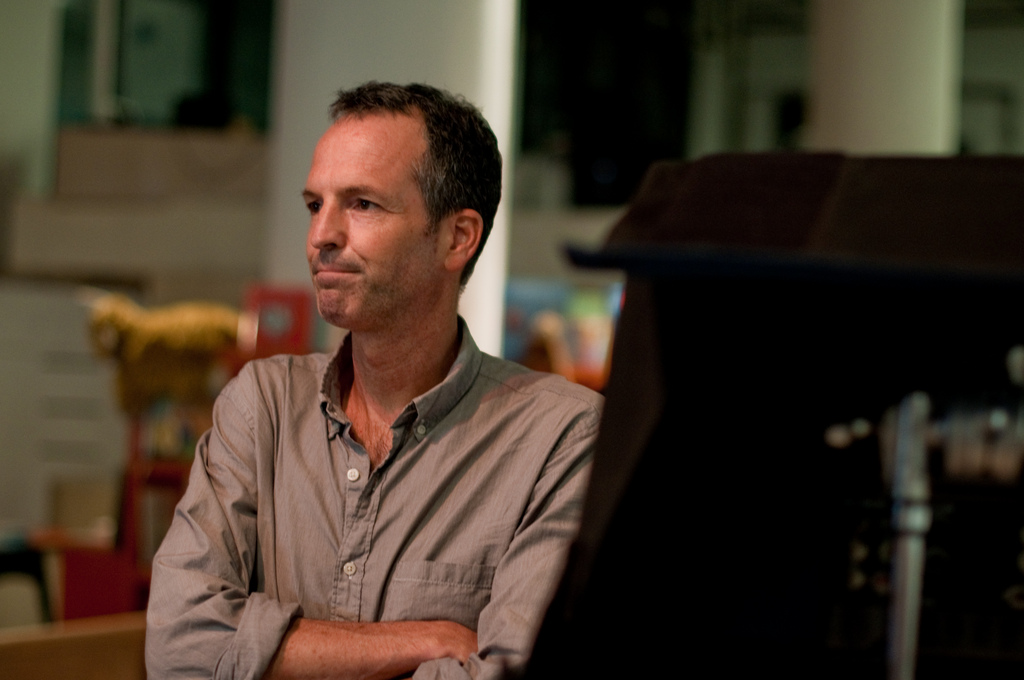
- Born: David Hillman Curtis; February 24, 1961; La Jolla, California, U.S.
- Died: April 18, 2012 (aged 51); Brooklyn, New York, U.S.

David Hillman Curtis (February 24, 1961 – April 18, 2012) was an American new media designer, author, musician and filmmaker. Curtis was the Principal and Chief Creative Officer of hillmancurtis.com, inc., a digital design and film production firm in New York City. Curtis was successful in several creative disciplines; he started as a rock musician, became a pioneer in Web Design and interactive design with Flash and finally made short films and advertising commercials.

== Early life and education ==
Curtis was born in La Jolla, San Diego, California, where he grew up with his two sisters and his mother Susan (née Hillman, sister of the musician Chris Hillman), and stepfather, Paul Zimmerman, both of whom were high school teachers. After schooling he studied creative writing and film theory at San Francisco State University.

== Career ==
=== Music ===
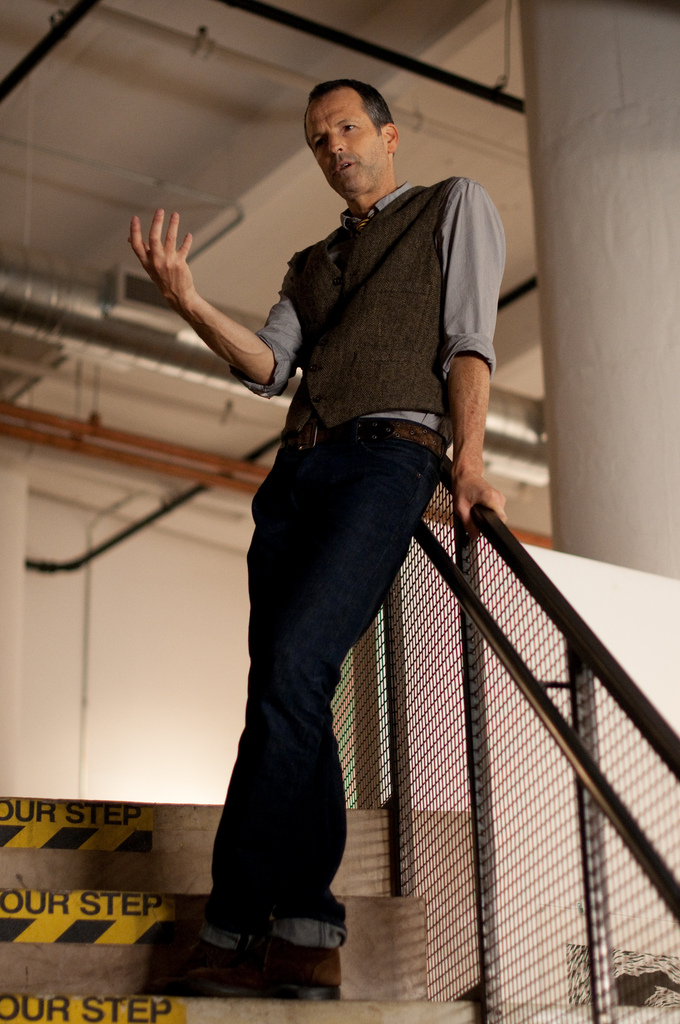
Hillman Curtis

While studying at the San Francisco State University, Curtis formed a rock group, which was later called 'Green Things'. In the coming decade, the band toured and even recorded an album with MCA Records, before disbanding. Curtis first came to prominence as one of the principal songwriters and bassists for the new wave group "Mrs. Green", formed while Curtis was attending San Francisco State University. The group recorded one album and toured the U.K. They toured briefly with the New Zealand band The Chills, and member of a Beatles revival cover band. Curtis later split off from the band and formed a new group called Green Things. Although Green Things signed a recording contract with [MCA Records] an album was never released.

=== Design ===
Curtis started studying art to design posters and fliers for his band. After the band broke up, Curtis now in his 30s started taking night classes on Photoshop. This led to a few part-time designing jobs, and eventually an entry-level job at Macromedia. Gradually, he went on to become a design director at Macromedia. While there in 1996 he designed the first web site using new technology, a browser plug-in Flash Player, which became a milestone in web designing.

In 1997, Curtis founded hillmancurtis, Inc, a design firm based in New York city which focused on web design and later film production. Then in 2000, he published a how to guide, Flash Web Design, which sold over 100,000 copies and remains a standard text for online design. In all, he published four books on new media design which have sold over 150 thousand copies and been translated into 14 languages. He designed sites for Yahoo, Adobe Systems, Metropolitan Opera and others.

=== Film ===
Curtis received acclaim for his online "Artist Series", a series of short documentaries on designers and artists, Milton Glaser, Paula Scher, David Carson, Lawrence Weiner, Stefan Sagmeister, James Victore, Pentagram, and the filmmaker Mark Romanek. He also has made short dramatic films as well as national commercials for IBM and BlackBerry, as well as web content for brands like Sprint, Bobbi Brown Cosmetics, SVA, and Rolling Stone.

In 2008, Curtis made a short documentary for the David Byrne and Brian Eno album Everything That Happens Will Happen Today and later directed the feature-length documentary Ride, Rise, Roar which chronicled the Songs of David Byrne and Brian Eno Tour.

He co-directed The Happy Film (2016) alongside Stefan Sagmeister and Ben Nabors. The documentary follows Sagmeister’s self-experiments with meditation, therapy, and pharmaceuticals to explore happiness, combining personal narrative with creative visual storytelling.

== Personal life ==
Curtis continued to actively manage Hillmancurtis until his death on April 18, 2012, at his Brooklyn home after a prolonged battle with colon cancer, at the age of 51. He was married and had two children.

== Filmography ==
- Soldiers (2008)
- Things I Have Learned in My Life So Far: Stefan Sagmeister (2008)
- Lawrence Weiner (2008)
- Embrace (2008)
- Bridge (2008)
- Ride, Rise, Roar (2010)
- Powerhouse Books (2011)

== Bibliography ==
- Hillman Curtis on Creating Short Films for the Web, (New Riders Publishing: August 2005)
- MTIV: Process, Inspiration and Practice for the New Media Designer, (New Riders Publishing: May 2002)
- Flash Web Design: The V5 Remix, (New Riders Publishing: March 2001)
- Flash Web Design: The Art of Motion Graphics, (New Riders Publishing: March 2000)
