= Wall Street: Money Never Sleeps =

2010 film by Oliver Stone

- Theatrical release poster
- Directed by: Oliver Stone
- Written by: Allan Loeb; Stephen Schiff
- Based on: Characters by Stanley Weiser and Oliver Stone
- Produced by: Edward R. Pressman; Eric Kopeloff
- Starring: Michael Douglas; Shia LaBeouf; Josh Brolin; Carey Mulligan; Eli Wallach; Susan Sarandon; Frank Langella
- Cinematography: Rodrigo Prieto
- Edited by: Julie Monroe; David Brenner
- Music by: Craig Armstrong
- Production companies: Edward R. Pressman Productions; Ixtlan Production; Dune Entertainment
- Distributed by: 20th Century Fox
- Release dates: May 14, 2010 (Cannes); September 24, 2010 (United States)
- Running time: 133 minutes
- Country: United States
- Language: English
- Budget: $70 million
- Box office: $134.7 million

Wall Street: Money Never Sleeps (also known as Wall Street 2 or Wall Street 2: Money Never Sleeps) is a 2010 American drama film directed by Oliver Stone, a sequel to Wall Street (1987). It stars Michael Douglas, Shia LaBeouf, Josh Brolin, Carey Mulligan, Frank Langella, Susan Sarandon and Eli Wallach.

The film takes place in New York City, 23 years after the original, and revolves around the 2008 financial crisis. Its plot centers on a supposedly reformed Gordon Gekko, played by Douglas, and follows his attempts to repair his relationship with his daughter Winnie (Mulligan), with the help of her fiancé, Jacob Moore (LaBeouf).

Principal photography took place in New York City between September and November 2009. After having its release date moved twice, Money Never Sleeps was released theatrically worldwide on September 24, 2010, by 20th Century Fox. Prior to its official release, many journalists connected to the financial industry were reportedly shown advance screenings of the film.

Despite opening to positive reception at the 2010 Cannes Film Festival, Money Never Sleeps received mixed reviews from critics. Though failing to meet its critical expectations, the film was successful at the box office, topping the United States's ranking during its opening weekend, and earning a worldwide total of $134 million in ticket sales, and more than $15 million on DVD.

== Plot ==
In 2008, seven years after former corporate raider Gordon Gekko was released from prison after serving time for insider trading and securities fraud, Gekko is promoting his new book Is Greed Good?, warning about a possible 2008 financial crisis. His estranged daughter, Winnie, runs a small, non-profit news blog and is dating Jacob "Jake" Moore, a top prop trader at Keller Zabel Investments (KZI). Jake, a protégé of KZI managing director Louis Zabel, has been raising money for Dr. Masters and a fusion research project which promises abundant clean energy. Jake also supports his mother Sylvia, who quit nursing to speculate in residential real estate.

In the early stages of the downturn predicted by Gekko, KZI's stock loses more than half its value. Louis Zabel's attempt to secure a bailout for KZI from other Wall Street banks is blocked by Bretton James, head of rival firm Churchill Schwartz (Church). KZI had refused to help Church during the dot-com bubble years earlier. Zabel kills himself by jumping in front of a subway train and Winnie accepts Jake's marriage proposal. Jake introduces himself to Gekko at a lecture. Gekko tells him that KZI collapses when James spread rumours of it having toxic debt. Jake agrees to reconcile Winnie and Gekko's relationship if Gekko can supply evidence of James' actions against KZI.

Jake spreads rumors about nationalization of an oil field in Equatorial Guinea, which Church has invested in. Church loses $120 million to this market manipulation. James is impressed by Jake's initiative and hires him, and Jake convinces Chinese investors to invest in Church's fusion project. Jake arranges for Gekko and Winnie to meet at a fundraiser. When Gekko confronts James about providing evidence against him in 2001, and his more recent actions against KZI, James tells Gekko he's no longer relevant. Gekko also encounters Bud Fox, who turned Bluestar Airlines into a huge success after his release from jail, then sold it for millions, and retired. Winnie confronts Gekko about their failed relationship, his affairs and her brother Rudy's suicide. When Gekko explains he obtained successful therapists in prison, and paid off a drug dealer to stop selling to Rudy, Winnie forgives him.

As the 2008 financial crisis accelerates, James and Church's chairman, Julius Steinhardt, advise federal regulators to buy their multi-billion-dollar subprime loans. When the real estate market collapses, Jake helps Sylvia with his own money. Winnie informs Jake she's expecting their first child. Jake learns James is diverting funds earmarked for the Chinese investment into underperforming solar panels, which pose far less threat to his fossil fuel investments. Gekko tells Jake that James had secretly made huge profits betting against subprime loans, yet still accepted massive bailout from the federal government.

Gekko surrenders a $100 million trust account he hid in Switzerland in the 1980s so Winnie can fund the fusion research. She signs the money over to Jake, and he entrusts it back to Gekko to complete the investment. Gekko leaves the country with the money, and Winnie breaks up with Jake. Gekko establishes a successful investment company in London with the money. Jake proposes that if Gekko gives Winnie the money back, he'll be allowed to participate in his grandchild's life. Gekko refuses.

Jake provides Winnie with the details of James's dealings, including KZI's collapse and the fraudulent government bailout. When Winnie posts the story to her website and James, under intense government scrutiny, is fired by his company which turns to Gekko's successful firm for a partnership. Gekko apologizes to Jake and tells him and Winnie that he's deposited $100 million into the fusion research account. She agrees to give Gekko and Jake each another chance. A year later, Gekko helps celebrate the first birthday of Jake and Winnie's son.

== Cast ==
- Michael Douglas as Gordon Gekko
- Shia LaBeouf as Jacob "Jake" Moore
- Josh Brolin as Bretton James
- Carey Mulligan as Winnie Gekko
- Susan Sarandon as Sylvia Moore
- Eli Wallach as Julius "Julie" Steinhardt
- Frank Langella as Louis "Lou" Zabel
- Austin Pendleton as Dr. Masters
- Sylvia Miles as Dolores, The Realtor
- Vanessa Ferlito as Audrey
- John Buffalo Mailer as Robby
- Jason Clarke as New York Fed Chief
- Oliver Stone as Investor
- Charlie Sheen as Bud "Buddy" Fox
- Donald Trump as himself (deleted scene)
- Anthony Scaramucci as himself
- Maria Bartiromo as herself, Newscaster Cameo
- Becky Quick as herself, Squawk Box Host Cameo
- Jim Cramer as Cameo Appearance
- Ali Velshi as Cameo Appearance
- Waltrudis Buck as Annica

== Characters ==
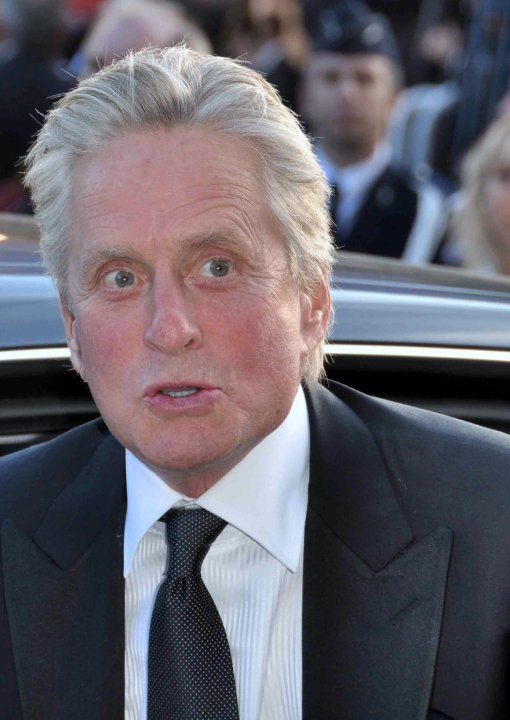
Douglas at the film's premiere at the 2010 Cannes Film Festival

Michael Douglas reprises his role as Gordon Gekko from Wall Street, which won him an Academy Award for Best Actor. Gekko has recently been released from prison and, after a failed attempt to warn business leaders of the imminent economic downturn, he decides to try to rebuild a relationship with his estranged daughter Winnie.

Shia LaBeouf portrays Jacob "Jake" Moore, an ambitious, young proprietary trader who works for Keller Zabel Investments, and is in a relationship with Winnie Gekko. LaBeouf's role in the film has been said to be a role similar to that of Charlie Sheen's in the original. The young actor said he was able to relate to his character's background and found similarities in their motivations. Initially the actor was intimidated by the idea of working on a film that was going to stretch his dramatic abilities and came to the film set with a different approach, which was that if he disappointed his fans twice, his career was finished after making two recently panned sequels.

LaBeouf stated that, during his first meeting with Stone, the director was "really expedient about killing any ego or conceit on my part", saying not to worry because Tom Cruise "was not an actor" when he first worked with him either, which LaBeouf considered "a knife to [his] heart". LaBeouf said that he did not know what a credit derivative is or what a CP, LP, or LVC were, commenting "You gotta know ticker names." To prepare for the film he traded with different firms, playing with up to $1 million, and became so interested in trading that he began studying for the Series 7 Exam.

Josh Brolin plays Bretton James, head of the Churchill Schwartz investment bank, whom Jacob blames for the death of his mentor. Bretton has been described as being a villain. Bretton is presented as a "new style" version of Gekko in the film. Javier Bardem was in final talks to play the character; in July 2009 it was confirmed that he had turned down the project in favor of a film adaptation of the book Eat, Pray, Love, with Julia Roberts. The actor, acknowledging that every character had both good and bad in them, viewed Bretton as being on a "higher level," adding that he liked the ambition his character had and that he was an opportunist.

Carey Mulligan was cast as Winnie Gekko, Gordon's estranged daughter and Jacob's fiancée. Winnie has not spoken to her father since his imprisonment; she blames Gordon for the suicide of her drugged-out brother, Rudy. The character has been said to be the "moral center of the story" and described as being liberal, and to some extent passive. Mulligan is British and had to speak with an American accent for her role. Wall Street: Money Never Sleeps was her first major studio film. When she first met Stone for the role she explained that she did not want her character to be a "token girlfriend"; both agreed to work to make sure that would not happen. During the same encounter Stone learned that she had short hair, and he initially discussed having her wear a wig, but Mulligan said she did not feel like herself when wearing the hairpiece. Stone trusted her and made an exception. According to Mulligan, Stone cast her in the Wall Street sequel based on her performance in An Education (2009).

Frank Langella was cast as Louis Zabel. His death "ultimately leads the characters to discover the shady practices" of James's bank. Susan Sarandon portrays Sylvia Moore, Jacob's real-estate agent mother who is just as consumed by greed as Gekko is, but in a different sense. Audrey, a "tough, intelligent trader in the Wall Street trenches", is portrayed by Vanessa Ferlito. John Buffalo Mailer plays Jacob's Long Island financier friend, Robby and Eli Wallach plays the part of Jules Steinhardt, a Churchill Schwartz top executive and Wall Street patriarch who considers the current economic climate to be like the 1929 stock market crash. Edward R. Pressman deemed the actor's role as the "crier of doom," who, "reveals just how much more devastating things can be today." Charlie Sheen reprised his role of Bud Fox, Gekko's former protégé, whom he meets briefly at a cocktail party. Sylvia Miles reprised her role as real estate agent Dolores from the first film.

Television actress Natalie Morales, economist Nouriel Roubini, journalist and producer Graydon Carter, financier Warren Buffett and director Stone's mother Jacqueline have minor roles in the film. Jim Cramer also makes a brief appearance after Stone cast him because he was a former hedge fund manager. Stone, who had a cameo in the first film, plays a similarly brief role in Wall Street: Money Never Sleeps. He wanted to give the young LaBeouf "some older connections" that would "give it weight" in the movie. Donald Trump played a minor part, but Trump's scene was cut from the final version (it is instead available on the DVD). Stone said the scene was too "distracting" for the ending. Program host Neil Cavuto appears in the sequel for several seconds. A longer scene that involved him was cut; a representative for Stone clarified that his decision was an aesthetic, not political, choice. Roger Hendricks Simon, a director-actor, landed a part acting as a thinly veiled version of former AIG CEO Hank Greenberg. Like Trump's part, his scenes were not included but are in the film's DVD version.

== Production ==
=== Development ===
In early 2007, The New York Times reported that a sequel to Wall Street, then tentatively titled Money Never Sleeps, had entered pre-production and was in the early stages of development with a screenplay by Stephen Schiff of The New Yorker. Shortly after the film was confirmed, Michael Douglas was reported to be interested in reprising his role as Gordon Gekko, depending on the script. In October 2008, 20th Century Fox announced that it had officially green-lit the film and would serve as a distributor. In the same month it was announced that Allan Loeb had been approached to write a script that was being referred to as a "page one rewrite", meaning that he would be starting "from scratch". Shortly after the film had entered pre-production it was announced that both Charlie Sheen and Daryl Hannah would not be involved with the sequel for unknown reasons. Despite stating that Sheen was not going to return, Oliver Stone confirmed he would briefly reprise his role as Bud, which would be worked into the script.

Around May 2007, The New York Times reported that Stone had turned down the opportunity to direct the film, even after months of being pressured to do so by Douglas, among others. However, in April 2009 Fox confirmed that Stone would be returning as both director and producer, alongside Douglas and Edward R. Pressman. Stone stated that he reconsidered passing on directing the film after the stock market crash. The film was co-produced by Eric Kopeloff with Alessandro Camon and Celia D. Costas serving as executive producers. In addition to screenwriter Loeb, the film's overall writer is Schiff. Bryan Burrough received credit as a consultant, and may have done uncredited work on the story.

At the time of the film's announcement the plot details were kept under wraps, but Loeb later confirmed that its plot would primarily focus on Gekko, recently released from prison and re-entering a much more "chaotic" financial world than the one he once oversaw from the previous film. Its budget was reported to be between $60 million ($50 million with the tax credits) and $70 million. Money Never Sleeps was being used as the film's working title before being renamed Wall Street 2 at the director's request and finally changed to Wall Street: Money Never Sleeps. As part of research for the film, Douglas and Stone had a dinner meeting with Samuel D. Waksal, the founder of the bio-pharmaceutical company ImClone Systems, who spent five years in federal prison for securities fraud. LaBeouf, along with Stone, discussed the financial collapse with multiple hedge fund managers.

Early in mid-2009, Stone took LaBeouf to a party organized by Nouriel Roubini, a New York University economics professor and chairman of his own consulting firm. There, Stone and LaBeouf discussed the financial collapse with Roubini and also discussed hedge fund managers who were clients of Roubini's firm. Roubini said that "in this financial crisis it was the traditional banks and the investment banks that had a larger role in doing stupid and silly things than the hedge funds." Stone also said that he had conversations with Jim Chanos, a prominent hedge fund manager who had urged him to focus less on hedge funds and more on the banking system. Chanos said, "there was a much more important story, a bigger story, in what happened with the system."

=== Writing ===
In October 2008, 20th Century Fox confirmed that Allan Loeb, who is a licensed stock broker, had been selected to re-write the script. Stanley Weiser had worked on a treatment for a sequel set in the present with Gekko being released from jail; the second part would be set in China. The studio felt that the material was dated, and put the project in turnaround. Stone had a falling out with Pressman, the producer, and began work on W. with Weiser. Weiser's treatment for Wall Street Two was discarded and the film began taking shape from an original script by Stephen Schiff. It was reported that Aaron Sorkin had turned down the opportunity to work on the film's script.

During December 2008, while still in the process of drafting, Loeb said that he had been riveted by the Bernie Madoff headlines and showed interest in referencing him in the film, noting: "the thing that is so crazy about this story is that Ponzi schemes seem to be the simplest low-class scam," and "but this was carried out in the highest echelon of high finance. You couldn't even get in to see this guy unless you had $2 million to invest." Stone clarified that Madoff will not be mentioned in the film, commenting that he considered Madoff's actions to be "a crook running a Ponzi scheme" which is "legal robbery." The filmmaker returned to the project in April on the strength of this script, feeling Loeb's draft was "so great" that he did not feel the need to touch it, although he did have the option.

Sometime in early June, Loeb reportedly handed in his second draft of the film to Fox, and in July, was finalizing the screenplay. Wall Street: Money Never Sleeps is based in four locations; New York, London, the United Arab Emirates, and an Asian country. One of the character consultants to the new film will be billionaire Vincent Tchenguiz. Pressman said that Tchenguiz had modeled Gekko but did admit that Gekko was "partly Milken" and that Gekko will be a more outwardly altruistic figure but, admits, "a leopard doesn't change its spots, despite appearances." Pressman said of the origin of the film's subtitle: "Wall Street was New York-centric. Today the markets are much more global, hence the title of the new film, Money Never Sleeps." He described Gekko's involvement in the film as being "larger than life".

It was reported that Loeb had taken advice from a "number of real Wall Street movers and shakers" to ensure "horrifying accuracy" for the film's script. Of the re-writes done to script, Stone said: "We sort of started over with the story of a young man who is at the center of it, and how he needs Gordon Gekko's help to navigate those waters." In a reference to the GEICO Gecko commercial, which was suggested by New York Governor David Paterson, Gekko says "even a caveman could do it" in the movie. At the request of Mulligan and LaBeouf, the filmmaker cut some dialogue from their characters' break-up scenes, which he at first was initially hesitant to do.

Stone said that the film will provide more of a social commentary and admitted that he had never expected high finance to "serve again as a tableau for his storytelling". He also added that its plot will showcase the unemployment rate at an all-time high and the "our national debt ever climbing." Discussing the difference between Wall Street and its sequel, the director explained, "In the other movie, Charlie Sheen is corrupt at the beginning and he finds a path to integrity. In this movie, it starts out the other way. Shia and Carey are idealists. And their idealism is being threatened." A writer for USA Today believed that the film's story line "attempts to put the complicated financial schemes that led to the worldwide economic collapse on a human scale."

=== Filming ===
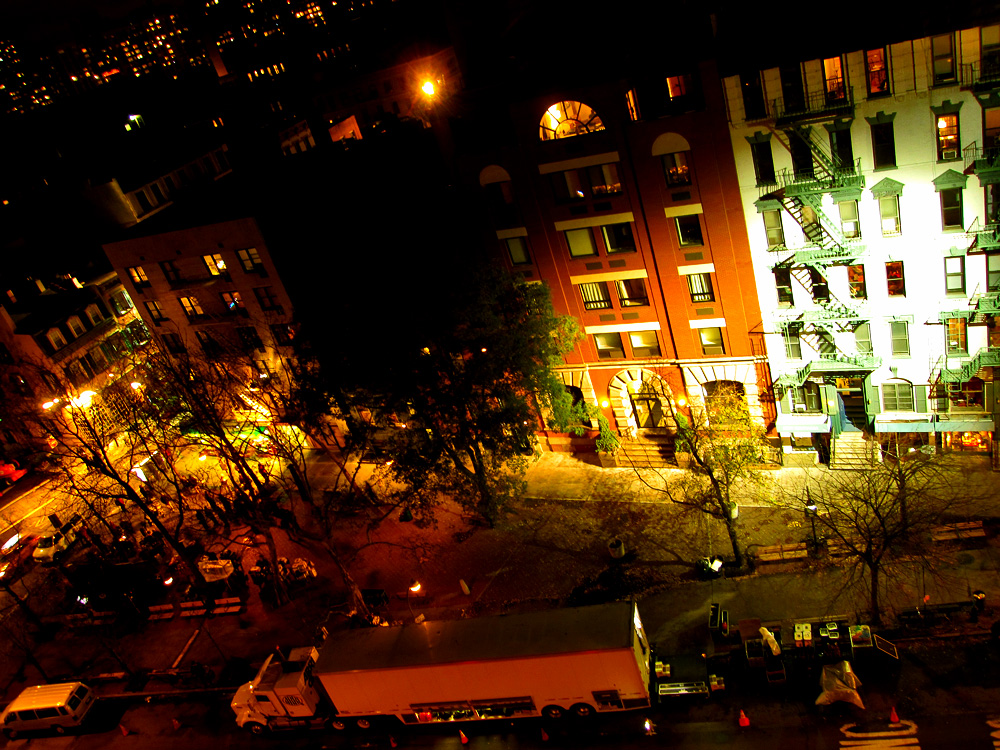
Wall Street: Money Never Sleeps being filmed on New York's 6th Avenue in November 2009

A shift in location in the sequel reflected some of the changes in the world since then: while the New York Stock Exchange and its trading floor had featured heavily in the first film, they are less prominent in the second. Instead, more time is spent at the Federal Reserve Building, reflecting its new position as a "bulwark of the system" according to Stone. The location provided a link to the contemporary crisis the film examines, since September 2008 it has been an important site for meeting on the crisis.

Although August 10 was reportedly the start date, principal photography began on September 9. The filmmaker continued to make additions to the script and meet with financial consultants about the project whilst filming. Mulligan was able to film all of her scenes in 15 days. Stone said that the filming on location process was similar to the first film. While filming, LaBeouf said that Douglas was an "opened wound on the set" due to his oldest son Cameron's arrest in July for drug trafficking, adding that Stone filmed a "struggling" Douglas.

Charlie Sheen was able to shoot his scene in one day and described being on set with the director and Douglas as strange, with Stone adding that it was difficult for the actor. Sheen reportedly had trouble remembering his lines and required some prodding to remember his cue during the party scene in which Gekko encounters Fox. Although eager to meet him, LaBeouf did not interact with Sheen on set per request. Regarding working with the director, who has a reputation for being demanding on his cast, Douglas described him as being mellow, but acknowledged that "it's still always a workout with him." "Everyone was very friendly, but the scene work felt dangerous," LaBeouf recalls of the on-set atmosphere. "These guys aren't going to coddle you. Douglas was the one who comforted me. And I've never gone deeper with a director than Oliver. He's the Easter Bunny and Orson Welles in one man." The young actor further discussed Stone's work ethic on-set with him, saying:

We'd be on the street [filming], and Oliver would just say, "Go to that bar, get fucked-up, and come back." I'd walk over, get smashed, and go back to work. He would really fuck with me when I was smashed. I get aggressive when I'm smashed, and he'd film that. He would just open you up completely, make you fucking naked – and then call, "Action!"

Douglas filmed the opening scene, which is Gekko being released from Sing Sing maximum-security prison, in Ossining, Westchester County, on September 18. Stone felt that the prison scene was a "key plot element" because there is no one there to meet Gekko, who returns to society as an outsider. Regarding there being no scenes that show Gekko adjusting to the modern world, the director clarified that there is "very little space to do those kind of tricks in this movie" because of how modern the world is becoming on a monthly basis. Filming took place in Fordham University for the classroom scenes on October 10 and 11. Brolin and Stone found extras simply by asking workers, at places like RdV, if they would like to be a part of the sequel.

== Soundtrack ==
Wall Street: Money Never Sleeps

Studio album by Various artists
- Released: September 21, 2010
- Genre: Soundtracks
- Label: Todo Mundo
- Producer: Budd Carr

The soundtrack to the film was released on September 21, 2010, through Todo Mundo. The album features numerous songs by David Byrne, including several tracks from his 2008 collaboration with Brian Eno, Everything That Happens Will Happen Today.

=== Track listing ===
1. "Prison" (Craig Armstrong)
2. "Home" (David Byrne and Brian Eno)
3. "Life Is Long" (David Byrne and Brian Eno)
4. "Sleeping Up" (David Byrne)
5. "Strange Overtones" (David Byrne and Brian Eno)
6. "Money" (Craig Armstrong)
7. "My Big Nurse" (David Byrne and Brian Eno)
8. "Helicopter Reveal" (Craig Armstrong)
9. "Tiny Apocalypse" (David Byrne)
10. "Lazy" (David Byrne)
11. "I Feel My Stuff" (David Byrne and Brian Eno)
12. "This Must Be the Place (Naive Melody)" (Talking Heads)
13. "Dekha" (ft. song by Ali Zafar)

== Release ==
=== Marketing ===
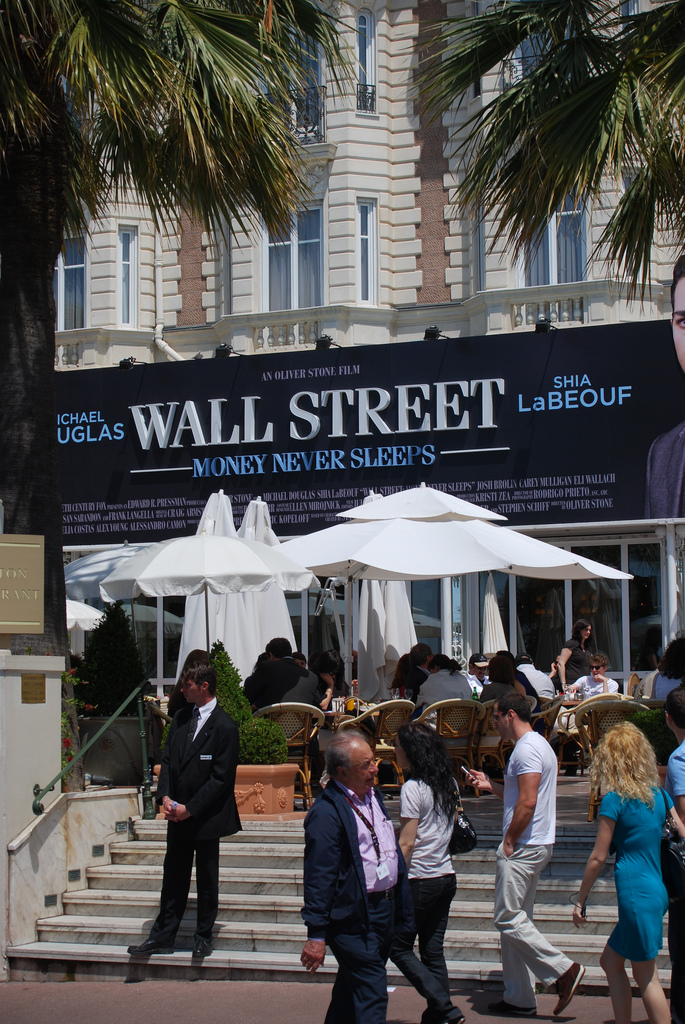
An advertisement for Wall Street: Money Never Sleeps at the 2010 Cannes Film Festival

The film was screened out of competition during May 2010 at the 2010 Cannes Film Festival in France. Pressman thought that Cannes would be the "perfect platform to launch a film that speaks of today's economic dilemma". It was met with positive reviews from film critics at the festival, although numerous reviewers "objected to an ending deemed somewhat pat". A spokesperson for Fox said that Stone had changed the ending since its screening at Cannes. Wall Street: Money Never Sleeps opened the Ischia Global Film & Music Festival, held during July 11–18. Michael Corkery of The Wall Street Journal reported that numerous journalists involved in the financial industry had been invited to see advance screenings of the film. To promote Wall Street: Money Never Sleeps, several cast members visited the NASDAQ Market site in Times Square, on September 20 and presided over the NASDAQ Opening Bell.

Also on September 20, the movie's New York premiere was held at the Ziegfeld Theater in Midtown Manhattan. According to Deadline Hollywood the film originally had a February 2010 release date, but it was later given an April 23, 2010, release. In March 2010, the film's release date was pushed back to September 24. Brolin stated that he hoped that audiences would wonder about the ethics of the banking industry, asking "How much is enough?," he concluded, "There used to be a ceiling. Now there's no ceiling". Surveys indicated that the main audience for the movie would be older adults who remembered the first film.

=== Box office ===
Money Never Sleeps opened at a total of 3,597 theaters in the United States, earning $6.9 million on its first day and $19 million in its opening weekend in the US, averaging $5,330 per theatre and becoming the number one movie at the box office, although falling short of studio estimates. Nonetheless, it still marked one of the best openings for a Stone film. Despite an increase of screens for its second weekend, Money Never Sleeps saw a 47% decrease on its earnings, falling to third place at the box office and making slightly over $10 million for the weekend.

During the October 8–10 weekend it had a further decrease, falling almost 55%, earning over $4 million and dropping to seventh place at the box office. In its fourth week of domestic release it fell under the top ten at the box office with a revenue of more than $1 million, after suffering a 48% decrease. Domestically, the film made $52.4 million, and has grossed over $134.7 million worldwide.

=== Home media ===
Wall Street: Money Never Sleeps was released on DVD and Blu-ray on December 21, 2010, in the US. Since then it has made more than $15.5 million in DVD sales revenue, selling more than 983,000 units.

== Reception ==
=== Critical response ===
The film's reception was mixed. Review tallying website Rotten Tomatoes reported an approval rating of 54%, based on a sample of 234 reviews, with an average rating of 5.97/10. The website's critical consensus reads, "It's more entertaining than many sequels, but with Oliver Stone directing, a terrific cast, and a timely storyline that picks up where the original left off, Wall Street: Money Never Sleeps should be better." By comparison, Wall Street (1987) had achieved a 79% positive rating. On Metacritic, the film has a weighted average score of 59 out of 100, based on 39 critics, indicating "mixed or average reviews". Audiences polled by CinemaScore gave the film an average grade of "B−" on an A+ to F scale.

Joe Neumaier of the New York Daily News awarded it five out of five stars saying that it is a sharp sequel that is worthy of its investment. He also saluted the cast's performance and noted that Douglas gives Gekko "uncounted layers as he fakes, deals and fuels fire". Matthew Toomey of Australia's 612 ABC Radio Brisbane gave it a B-rating and said that Douglas is the film's "biggest positive", finding LaBeouf to be unconvincing in his role. Christy Lemire, in The Canadian Press, claimed that the film ultimately "goes soft and loses its way" and described the contrast in its final scenes as being "laughable". Furthermore, the subplot between LaBeouf and Mulligan's characters was criticized as unneeded and pointed out that their relationship leads viewers to wonder why Winnie, who despises Gekko, would be involved with a man who does exactly the same thing as him, which she condemns; however, Lemire acknowledged that the movie is an uncommon sequel that seems to be both relevant and necessary and said that it proves that "greed can still be good". Film critic Colin Newton of the Brisbane Sunday Mail felt that the plot lacked the enthusiasm of the first film. Along the same lines, Village Voice contributor Nick Pinkerton pointed out that the Wall Street sequel did not have the "clean, fable-like arc" formula of its predecessor.

Kirk Honeycutt of The Hollywood Reporter said that the film succeeded in being one of the better sequels in a while, but that Stone "gets too fancy here and there", the film's "heavy reliance on multiple screens, graphics and digital tricks makes it feel like one is watching CNN with all its computer-screen busyness." Roger Ebert, reviewing the movie in the Chicago Sun-Times, noted that it ended with a better conclusion when Stone had edited the film after its Cannes viewing, but still felt it was a little too long. He considered the film to be sophisticated and said its photography was aesthetically pleasing but stated he wanted it to be "outraged." In The Guardian, Peter Bradshaw gave the film two out of five stars, commenting that "despite the pious waffle about market craziness being like cancer, no one is ever shown enduring the actual misery of losing money." Writing for Time magazine, Richard Corliss stated that the film has the "drive, luxe and sarcastic wit of the snazziest Hollywood movies." David Edelstein, writing in New York Magazine, described the film as being "full of promise, with minuscule returns." He concluded that, like Stone's other recent work, it is difficult to distinguish what the project's focus is supposed to be.

Joe Morgenstern from The Wall Street Journal wrote that the movie manages to keep a hold on its audience's attention. He thought that Douglas measured up to Gekko's standards in the film, believing that he was the only actor to sustain a "sense of nasty fun", and felt that LaBeouf's effectiveness was within the range of the film-maker's direction, but was unimpressed with Brolin's portrayal of James. He concluded that the script takes an unconvincing jab at Gekko's "spiritual regeneration," which was due to a scene that he considered to be "inherently illogical and emotionally inert." The Daily Telegraph's David Gritten said that Wall Street: Money Never Sleeps lacked the "punch" of the original film and was annoyed by the number of cameos throughout the film. Wall Street: Money Never Sleeps received three out of five stars from Stephen Lambrechts of IGN Australia. Lambrechts felt that Stone's growth as a film director might mirror Gekko's as a person; having had used time to calm down over the years and settle into a more relaxed state of being. He concluded that the film's final result is not "quite the incendiary attack that it could have been, but it still has plenty to say while also managing to be an entertaining crowd pleaser."

In contrast to the film's detractors, BoxOffice journalist Pete Hammond said the film was "brilliantly cast" and labeled it a "crackerjack powerhouse of a movie that shines a light on the financial machinations". He stated that Douglas does not lose any of the substance of Gekko and LaBeouf is firm as Jacob. The writer predicted the Wall Street sequel's box office performance would be brisk, while the prospects were assured on DVD. Andrew O'Hehir's of Salon.com reviewed the film from Cannes, calling it an "ambitious, uneven, surprisingly talky melodrama, which mixes a quasi-documentary approach to the crash of 2008 with the story." O'Hehir's considered the film to express a more "personal, intimate sense of moral hazard". Marshall Fine, writing in the Huffington Post, viewed the film as an "overstuffed blend of agitprop and melodrama" that contains a cautionary story pertaining to unchecked capitalism. He considered Stone to be proclaiming a message of the "cancerous effects of greed". Bill Goodykoontz of Arizona Republic admitted that he was not surprised to see that the sequel is not as effective as its predecessor, though it was an engaging film at the top of its game when it is hostile, and less satisfying during romantic parts. He ended by saying that it is not a "great movie", but explained that it is an "effective commentary on what greed cost" everyone. CEO of Tullett Prebon, Terry Smith, one of the largest inter-dealer money brokers in the world, reviewed the movie for Today on BBC Radio 4. He gave it three out of five saying that, although it was "a little bit corny in some respects", it puts the events of the credit crunch into context and that "it rings reasonably true," capturing some of the activities, the moods and the individuals quite well."

=== Accolades ===
Award	Date of ceremony	Category	Recipient(s)	Result
Palm Springs International Film Festival	January 8, 2011	Breakthrough Performance Award (Also for Never Let Me Go)	Carey Mulligan	Won
68th Golden Globe Awards	January 16, 2011	Best Actor in a Supporting Role	Michael Douglas	Nominated
13th Costume Designers Guild Awards	February 22, 2011	Excellence in Contemporary Film	Ellen Mirojnick	Nominated
2011 Teen Choice Awards	August 7, 2011	Choice Movie: Actor Drama	Shia LaBeouf	Nominated

== See also ==
- 2010 in film
- Cinema of the United States
- List of American films of 2010
