= Topspin Media =

US marketing platform, 2007 to 2020

- Website type: E-Commerce and Web Marketing
- Website: TopspinMedia.com
- Commercial: Yes
- Launched: June 2007
- Current status: inactive

Topspin Media (or Topspin) was a technology company that provides direct-to-consumer retail and marketing software for musicians, filmmakers, artists, authors, and other content creators.

== History ==
Topspin was founded in 2007 by Peter Gotcher (co-creator of Pro Tools) and Shamal Ranasinghe. In its early stages, Topspin's software was accessible to artists through invitation only. The company gradually expanded by testing new features through direct-to-consumer campaigns for notable artists such as David Byrne and Brian Eno. In recognition of this approach, Billboard magazine named Topspin the Indie Visionary of the Year in 2008.

In 2010, Topspin introduced a new ticketing system, which facilitated the sold-out success of two fan-exclusive Pixies shows at The Troxy in London, England. CEO Ian Rogers, in February 2011, announced the company's decision to open its previously private software to the general public. On March 16, 2011, the Topspin platform became accessible to everyone. The company promoted this public launch during the South By Southwest music festival, where they hosted a three-day software demonstration and awarded a $5,000 "Direct-to-Fan Grant" to the artist with the most compelling direct-to-fan marketing plan.

Topspin has consistently maintained a presence at industry conferences such as MIDEM and South By Southwest. In October 2011, Topspin was among the first four partners selected for integration into YouTube's Merch Store. In March 2012, it was announced that Topspin's e-commerce and marketing technology would power MTV Networks' Artists initiative, set to launch in the summer of that year.

Topspin Media is headquartered in Santa Monica, California, and operates satellite offices in New York, Nashville, and London, England. The company was acquired by Beats Music in 2014.

Beats Music sold TopSpin to Transform Capital a few months later and the company began to collapse. The website went offline in 2020.

== Features ==
Topspin is a web-based application structured into six primary sections or tabs for users: Dashboard, Products, Promote, Fans, Sell, and Fulfill. As users log in, they are directed to the account Dashboard, providing an overview of recent sales and marketing data. The additional sections are:

- Products. Users can create, bundle, and manage assets within their catalog.
- Promote. Offers tools for online promotion and acquiring fans.
- Fans. Allows users to manage and organize their acquired fan base.
- Sell. Users can create e-commerce "offers" to sell items from their Products catalog. Offers are made available through an artist's integrated Topspin Store (Spinshop) or embedded directly on any website.
- Fulfill. Primarily serves as an orders management interface for receiving and processing customer orders.

Topspin can bundle multiple products together for sale as a unified package. For example, a single package can include a CD, T-shirt, concert ticket, album download, and other items. CEO Ian Rogers has referred to this strategy of combining physical and digital goods as "rebuilding." In February 2012, Rogers noted that Topspin sells roughly equal numbers of physical and digital units; however, the majority (75%) of revenue generated by Topspin artists comes from the sale of physical merchandise.

The Topspin application offers integrated tools for e-commerce, fan relationship management, marketing, and the fulfillment of both digital and physical goods.

Other notable features of the Topspin platform include:

- Topspin Store (or "Spinshop") – a customizable, hosted, embeddable store available to all users.
- Email for Media Widget – an embeddable tool collecting fan email addresses in exchange for free downloads.
- Redemption Codes – randomized or vanity-style codes for secure free download campaigns.
- Membership – allows users to limit store offers to fan club members only.
- Automated Digital Preorders – users specify future digital delivery dates and instant gratification products for specific offers.
- Digital Ticketing – tickets are scanned with Topspin's accompanying iPhone app.
- Product Bundling – the ability to package multiple products together for sale as bundles.
- Topspin Fulfillment – an integrated worldwide fulfillment solution available to all Topspin users.

== Clients and users ==
At the time of Topspin's public launch in March 2011, the company's artist roster numbered between three and four thousand. By March 2012, one year after its public launch, Topspin's roster approached 20,000. Notable artists include:

- Alexz Johnson
- Paul McCartney
- Linkin Park
- Eminem
- Beastie Boys
- Arcade Fire
- Trent Reznor
- The Smashing Pumpkins
- Noel Gallagher
- Kanye West
- Kevin Smith
- Pixies
- Sigur Rós
- Daughtry
- DJ Shadow
- Dead Can Dance
- Universal Music Group artists
- Tyler, The Creator
- Atlantic Records artists
- Maroon 5
- David Byrne with Brian Eno (Everything That Happens Will Happen Today) and St. Vincent (Love This Giant)
