= Noémie Lafrance =

Canadian choreographer

- Born: November 22, 1973 (age 52)
- Occupation: Choreographer
- Known for: Founder and artistic director of Sens Production

Noémie Lafrance (born November 22, 1973) is a Canadian-born choreographer living and working in New York since 1994. She is known for making large-scale site-specific dance performances that use the architecture of the city as the setting for her work. She is the founder and artistic director of Sens Production—a not-for-profit dance production company based in Brooklyn founded in 2001. She has received a Bessie Award and an MVPA award for her work. The Feist music video1234 that she choreographed was nominated for a Grammy.

== Career ==
Lafrance's piece Descent was performed in a twelve-story stairwell designed by legendary architect Stanford White in Lower Manhattan. The performance ran more than 80 times to a total audience of over 5000 people in 2001, 2002, and 2003. Noir, a piece staged in a parking garage and viewed by the audience through the windshield of their cars, was presented as a part of the Whitney Biennial and was co-produced by Danspace Project in 2004. Lafrance was commissioned by the Neuberger Museum of Art to create Unseen: Landscapes, a performance inspired by April Gornik's paintings and performed by the MFA students at Purchase College SUNY in the fall of 2004.

She was named one of "25 to Watch" in 2004 by Dance Magazine.

Her work Migrations was commissioned by the Whitney Museum at Altria and was performed as part of the 2005 Performance on 42nd Street, score by Janek Schaefer. Agora, followed by its second version, Agora II, were produced and presented by Sens Production in the abandoned McCarren Park Pool site in Brooklyn in 2005 and 2006. The performance reopened the abandoned site to the public for the first time in 20 years, was seen by more than 15,000 people, and was performed more than 30 times. She choreographed Invasion[6] as part of Dance Charettes produced by Dancing in the Streets at Governor's Island. In 2008, Lafrance was commissioned to create Rapture using the architecture of the Frank Gehry-designed The Richard B. Fisher Center for the Performing Arts at Bard College in the Hudson Valley, NY, score by Janek Schaefer. Lafrance has since started a series of performances sponsored by Tiffany & Co., staging other Gehry designs worldwide. In 2009, she choreographed and performed a solo work called Home, using her body as the site for the performance. Her work Melt, initially created in 2003 in the Black and White Gallery's courtyard in Brooklyn, features dancers covered in bee's wax and lanolin performing on seats attached to a wall. Melt toured the Festival TransAmerique, in Montreal, Mellemrum in Copenhagen, and SESC in São Paulo, Brazil, in 2008.

Noémie Lafrance has worked in film, video, and TV commercials since 2007. The Feist video 1234, which she choreographed, was featured on the Apple iPod Nano commercial and aired internationally. She recently choreographed the viral commercial Daffy's Dance for the clothing retailer Daffy's in 2009. She has collaborated with director Patrick Daughters on several videos and commercials and with visual artist Doug Aitken on his film installation Sleepwalking, commissioned by MOMA in winter 2007. She worked with David Byrne on the choreography of one of his world tours, launching his new album with Brian Eno in September 2008. Ms. Lafrance was commissioned to choreograph the Opera King Rogers and Ballet Harnasie for twelve dancers and fifty chorus singers directed by Lech Majeski in the summer of 2008 at the Fisher Center for the Performing Arts. In 2011, Lafrance choreographed two music videos for Snow Patrol, Called Out In The Dark and In The End.

Lafrance made her debut as a film director with Rapture, a black and white short film featuring elements of her performance staging the architecture of Frank Gehry in 2008. In 2009 she directed a short film, her first site-specific choreography for the camera, entitled Eyes Nose Mouth. She directed and choreographed Melt in 2010, a short dance film inspired by the Melt live performance work.

== Works ==
Her choreography works include:

- Descent (2001–2003)
- Melt Tour (2003–2010)
- Noir (2004)
- Agora (2005)
- Agora II (2006)
- Rapture (2008)
- Home (2009)
- Melt (2010)
- The White Box Project (2011)
- Songs of David Byrne and Brian Eno Tour (2009–2010)

Her Film works include:

- Descent (2003)
- Rapture (2008)
- Eyes nose mouth (2009)
- Melt (2010)
