= Kaïssa =

Cameroonian musician

- Origin: Cameroon
- Genres: World Music
- Years active: 1988–present
- Website: www.kaissa.com

Kaïssa is a Cameroon born world musician. She moved to Paris with her family at thirteen and to New York City in 1996. Kaissa worked on stage and in studio with Salif Keita, Manu Dibango, Kofi Olomide, Papa Wemba, Cesária Évora, Martha Wash, Diana Ross, Paul Simon and others. Her first solo album was Looking There.

In 2008, she joined David Byrne on the Songs of David Byrne and Brian Eno Tour.
