= ECA =

ECA, Eca or Eça may refer to:

== Companies ==
- ECA International, a consulting firm
- ECA Records, a record label based in New York City
- Encana, a Canadian independent petroleum company that existed from 2002 to 2020
- Eurocypria Airlines, a Cypriot charter airline that operated from 1992 to 2010
- European Coastal Airlines, a Croatian seaplane operator that existed from 2000 to 2016

== Education ==
- ACES Educational Center for the Arts, in New Haven, Connecticut, United States
- Edinburgh College of Art, in Scotland
- Education Corporation of America, a company running schools in southern American states
- Emmanuel Christian Academy (Ohio), in Springfield, Ohio
- Escuela Campo Alegre, an American international school in Caracas, Venezuela
- Evangel Christian Academy, in Shreveport, Louisiana
- Evangelical Christian Academy (Madrid, Spain)
- School of Communications and Arts, University of São Paulo (Portuguese: Escola de Comunicações e Artes), in Brazil

== Government ==
- Bureau of Educational and Cultural Affairs, of the United States Department of State
- Economic Commission for Africa, a United Nations commission for encouraging economic cooperation among nations of the African continent)
- Economic Cooperation Administration, a former United States government agency
- Electronic Components Assemblies, a division of the Electronic Industries Alliance
- European Court of Auditors, an institution of the European Union
- Executive Council of Alberta, the Canadian province's executive branch
- Export credit agency, a private or quasi-governmental institution that acts as an intermediary between national governments and exporters
- United Nations Economic Commission for Africa, a commission to encourage economic cooperation among African countries

== Law ==
- Electoral Count Act, of the United States
- Essential Commodities Act, of the Parliament of India
- European Chips Act, a legislative package to encourage semiconductor production in the European Union
- European Communities Act 1972 (Ireland), of the Oireachtas (Irish Parliament)
- European Communities Act 1972 (UK), of the Parliament of the United Kingdom

== Medicine and anatomy ==
- ECA stack, a combination of ephedrine, caffeine, and aspirin
- Emergency care assistant, in the United Kingdom
- External carotid artery
- External control arm clinical trial

== People ==
- António Eça de Queiroz (1891 - 1968), a Portuguese monarchist politician and agitator
- António Júlio da Costa Pereira de Eça (1852 - 1917), a general of the Portuguese Army, a colonial administrator and minister of War
- Duarte de Eça (born c. 1480), 3rd Captain-major of Portuguese Ceylon
- Eça de Queiroz (1845 - 1900), one of the greatest Portuguese writers in the realist style
- Ferdinand of Portugal, Lord of Eça (c. 1378 - c. 1460), the son of Portuguese Infant John, Duke of Valencia de Campos
- Filipa de Eça (c. 1480 - 1551), a 16th-century Portuguese nun
- Joana de Eça (1480 - 1572), a Portuguese courtier and royal favorite
- Luiz Eça (1936 - 1992), Brazilian pianist

== Science and technology ==
- Elementary cellular automaton
- Engineering Critical Assessment
- Enterobacterial common antigen
- Enterprise Collaboration Architecture, a standard of the Object Management Group
- Ethyl cyanoacrylate
- European Crystallographic Association, an independent scientific organisation, representing both national crystallographic associations in Europe as well as individual members
- Event condition action, a principle to define triggers in a database

== Sports ==
- Euroleague Commercial Assets, a private company that runs and operates the top continental-wide basketball men's professional sports club competitions in Europe
- European Canoe Association, the umbrella organization for canoeing sport in Europe
- European Club Association, an association of European football clubs

== Other uses ==
- Easington Catchment Area, a group of natural gas fields in the North Sea
- Ecologically Critical Area, in Bangladesh
- Electrical Contractors' Association, a British industry association
- Emission Control Area, sea areas with regulated sulfur and nitrous oxides emission caps
- Entertainment Consumers Association, an American consumer advocacy organization
- Europe and Central Asia, an abbreviation used by the World Bank
- European Cockpit Association, a trade union
- European Compliance Academy, a leading European not-for-profit organization for promoting harmonization of GMP and regulatory guidelines within the EU pharmaceutical industry
- European Communist Action, a coalition of political parties
- Evangelical Church Alliance
