= My Life in the Bush of Ghosts =

My Life in the Bush of Ghosts may refer to:

- My Life in the Bush of Ghosts (novel), 1954 novel by Amos Tutuola
- My Life in the Bush of Ghosts (album), 1981 album by Brian Eno and David Byrne, titled after Tutuola's novel
