= Kathryn Kuhlman =

American evangelist (1907–1976)

Kathryn Johanna Kuhlman
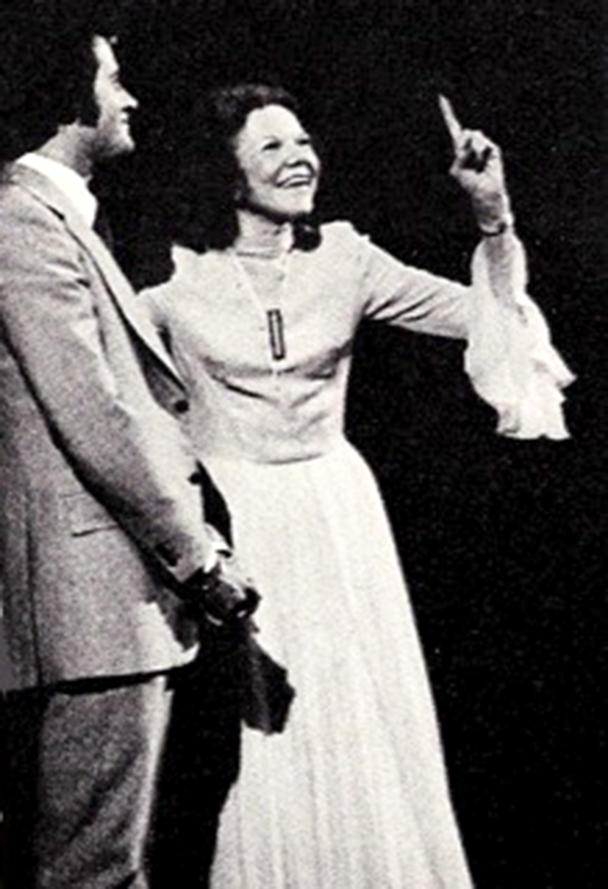
- Richard Roberts and Kathryn Kuhlman in 1975.
- Born: May 9, 1907; Johnson County, Missouri, U.S.
- Died: February 20, 1976 (aged 68); Tulsa, Oklahoma, U.S.
- Occupation: Evangelist
- Spouse(s): Burroughs Allen Waltrip, October 18, 1938– ? 1948 (divorced)

Kathryn Kuhlman (May 9, 1907 – February 20, 1976) was an American Christian evangelist, preacher and minister who was referred to by the press as a faith healer.

== Early life ==
Kathryn Johanna Kuhlman was born on May 9, 1907 in Concordia, Missouri, where her father was mayor. She was one of four children of German-American parents, Joseph Adolph Kuhlman and Emma Walkenhorst. One report states that Kuhlman's father was Baptist and her mother was Methodist, and the latter as having been "an excellent Bible teacher".

As a teenager, Kuhlman had a "deep spiritual experience", otherwise referred to as her being "converted" at age 14 "at an evangelistic meeting... in a small Methodist church". Her New York Times obituary states that she began preaching at age of 16, a matter otherwise stated as her having begun "sharing her testimony" at that age, in a ministry involving the Parrotts—her older sister, Myrtle, and brother-in-law and "itinerant evangelist, Everett B. Parrott".

== Career ==
According to one source, at an evangelistic meeting much later than her sixteenth year, in 1928, her sister "Myrtle and Kathryn preached to cover for [Myrtle's husband] Everette",

Everette [having] missed a meeting in Boise, Idaho. The pastor of the [host] church encouraged Kathryn to step out on her own. Helen [the Parrott ministry pianist] agreed to join her. Her [Kuhlman's] first sermon was in a run-down pool hall in Boise, Idaho[,]

a sequence of events that has Kuhlman's independent ministry beginning in that year. In a 1970 write-up in the Pasadena Star-News, it was suggested she had no theological training. At some point, she is said to have "stud[ied] the Bible on her own for two years", after which she sought and received ordination from the fundamentalist Evangelical Church Alliance.

Kuhlman had a weekly TV program in the 1960s and 1970s called I Believe In Miracles, which aired nationally. She also had a 30-minute nationwide radio program, which featured sermons and frequent excerpts from her faith healing services in music and message. Her foundation was established in 1954, and its Canadian branch in 1970. Late in her life she was supportive of the nascent Jesus movement.

By 1970, she had moved to Los Angeles, conducting services for thousands of people hoping to be healed, and was often compared to Aimee Semple McPherson.

She was friendly with Christian television evangelist Pat Robertson, and made guest appearances at his Christian Broadcasting Network (CBN) and on the network's flagship program The 700 Club.

=== Employee lawsuits ===
In 1975, Kuhlman was sued by Paul Bartholomew, her personal administrator, who said that she kept $1 million in jewelry and $1 million in fine art hidden away and sued her for $430,500 for breach of contract. Two former associates accused her in the lawsuit of diverting funds and of illegally removing records, which she denied and said the records were not private. According to Kuhlman, the lawsuit was settled prior to trial.

=== Controversies regarding faith healing ===
A retrospective in Tulsa World in 2016 estimated that two million people had reported that they had been healed in her meetings over the years she was active. In the 1970s, physician William A. Nolen conducted a case study in Philadelphia of 23 people (following his 1967 medical fellowship), individuals who has said, during one of her services, that they had been cured of some malady. Nolen's long term follow-ups concluded that there were no cures in those cases. One woman who was said to have been cured of spinal cancer threw away her brace and ran across the stage at Kuhlman's command; her spine collapsed the next day and she died four months later.

Nolen's analysis of Kuhlman came in for criticism from believers. Lawrence Althouse, a physician, said that Nolen had attended only one of Kuhlman's services and did not follow up with all of those who said they had been healed there. Richard Casdorph produced a book of evidence in support of miraculous healings by Kuhlman. Hendrik van der Breggen, a Christian philosophy professor, argued in favor of the claims. New Testament Scholar Craig Keener concluded, "No one claims that everyone was healed, but it is also difficult to dispute that significant recoveries occurred, apparently in conjunction with prayer. One may associate these with Kathryn Kuhlman's faith or that of the supplicants, or, as in some of Kuhlman's teaching, to no one's faith at all; but the evidence suggests that some people were healed, even in extraordinary ways.". Kuhlman's New York Times obituary noted that "Richard Owellen, a member of [a] cancer‐research department of the Johns Hopkins Hospital who appeared frequently at Miss Kuhlman's services, testified to various healings that he said he had investigated". However, independent verification of an individual by that name holding a position at Johns Hopkins Hospital has proven difficult, and no records of such an affiliation appear in publicly available Johns Hopkins directories. A similarly named researcher, Richard J. Owellen, has published work in pharmacology, though no connection to Johns Hopkins Hospital or to the investigation of faith healings has been established in reliable sources.

== Personal life ==
Kuhlman met the married Texas evangelist Burroughs Waltrip (b. 1903), in 1935, when he was a guest speaker at Kuhlman's Denver Revival Tabernacle, and the two began a romantic relationship. After it began, Kuhlman's friends tried to encourage her to not marry Waltrip, friends whom she told that she could not "find the will of God in the matter"; however, she is said to have reasoned that Waltrip's wife had left him, rather than he leaving her, a matter about which available sources are unclear.

Eventually, Waltrip divorced his first wife and left his family, and moved to Mason City, Iowa. On October 18, 1938, she secretly married "Mister," as she called him, in Mason City. The two started a revival center called Radio Chapel, with Kuhlman helping Waltrip raise funds for the new venture. The marriage is said to have brought Kuhlman no peace, and they eventually separated, childless, in 1944, and divorced in 1948. Regarding the marriage, Kuhlman stated in a 1952 Denver Post interview that Waltrip "charged—correctly—that I refused to live with him. And I haven't seen him in eight years."

Kuhlman expressed remorse on many occasions for her part in the pain caused by the breakup of Waltrip's marriage, citing his children's heartbreak as particularly troubling to her, and claiming it to be the single greatest regret of her life.

== Death ==
In July 1975, a doctor diagnosed Kuhlman with a minor heart flare-up; in November, she had a relapse. As a result, Kuhlman underwent open-heart surgery in Tulsa, Oklahoma, during which she died on February 20, 1976.

Kathryn Kuhlman was buried in the Forest Lawn Memorial Park Cemetery in Glendale, California. A plaque in her honor is in the main city park in Concordia, Missouri, a town in central Missouri on Interstate Highway 70.

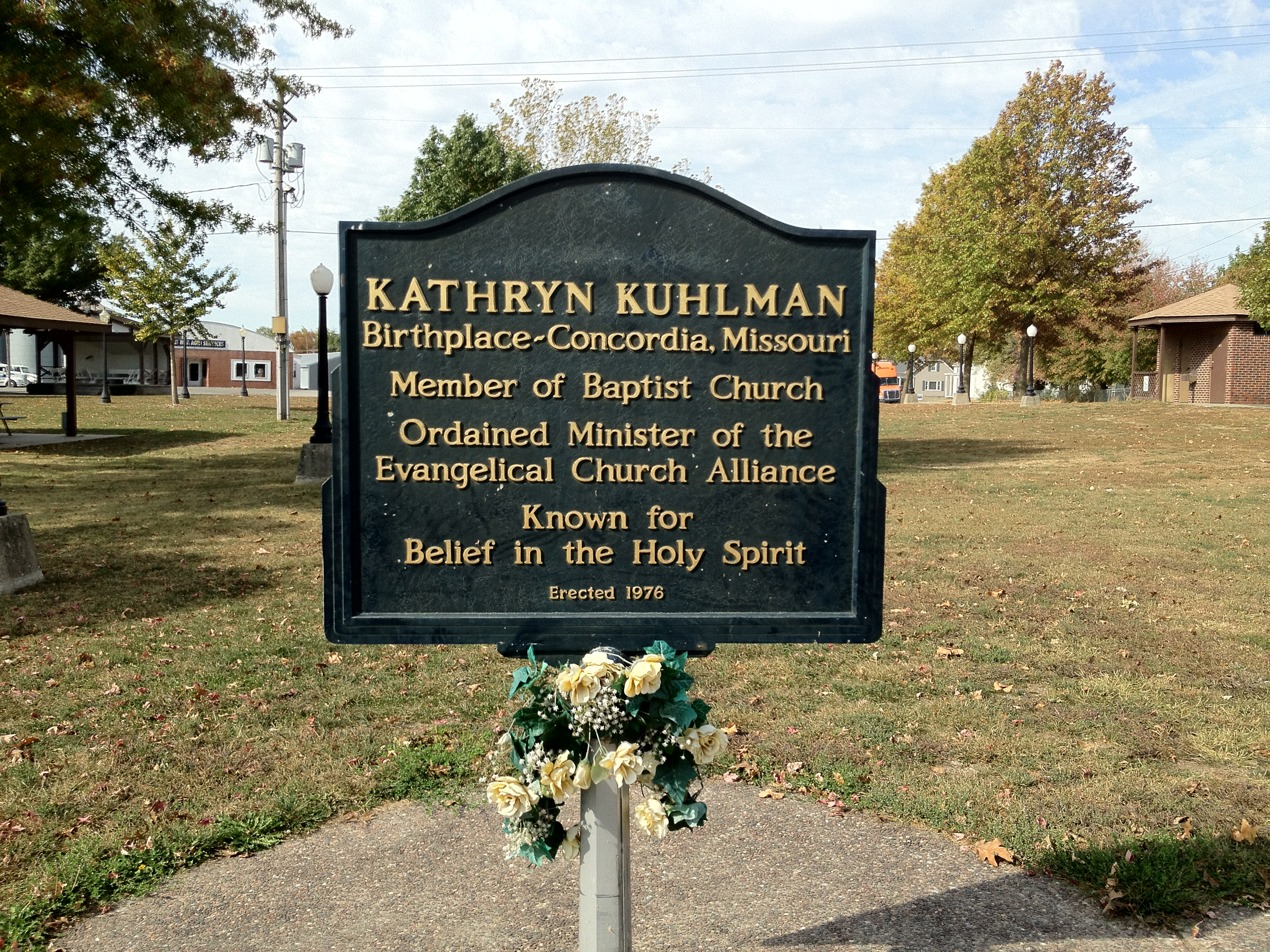
Kathryn Kuhlman Plaque, Concordia, MO

== Legacy ==
The Kathryn Kuhlman Foundation continued, but due to lack of funding, it terminated its nationwide radio broadcast in 1982. The foundation shut down altogether in April 2016. After Kuhlman died, her will led to controversy. She left $267,500, the bulk of her estate, to three members of her family and twenty of her employees. Smaller bequests were given to 19 other employees. According to the Independent Press-Telegram, her employees were disappointed when they learned that "she did not leave most of her estate to the foundation as she had done under a previous 1974 will."

Hank Hanegraaff, writing in Counterfeit Revival, has suggested that Kuhlman might be viewed as an important forerunner to the present-day charismatic movement. She influenced faith healers Benny Hinn and Billy Burke. Hinn has adopted some of her techniques and he also wrote a book about Kuhlman, as he frequently attended her preaching services. Burke did meet her and was counseled by her, having claimed a miracle healing in her service as a young boy.

As a child, minister-turned-moviemaker Richard Rossi was fascinated with Kuhlman. A 2005 article mentioned Kuhlman as an influence on a young Rossi, that led him for a time to conduct similar faith-healing services. On May 7, 2026, Charisma (magazine) reported Rossi was producing a film about his childhood recollections of Kuhlman, starring actress-evangelist Gemma Wenger in the role of Kuhlman.

In 1981, David Byrne and Brian Eno sampled one of Kuhlman's sermons for a track which they created during sessions for their collaborative album My Life in the Bush of Ghosts. After failing to clear the license to Kuhlman's voice from her estate, the track was reworked to use audio from an unidentified exorcism, with this modified version being released as "The Jezebel Spirit". The Kuhlman version was later included on the 1992 bootleg recording Ghosts, titled "Into the Spirit Womb".

== Published works ==
The following is a list of some of Kathryn Kuhlman's published works.

- Kuhlman, Kathryn (1962). I Believe in Miracles. Carmel, NY: Guideposts Associates.

Also published as/by:
- —— (1964). I Believe in Miracles. Hoboken, NJ: Prentice-Hall.

- God Can Do It Again. 1969.
- Nothing Is Impossible With God. Bridge-Logos Publishers. 1974.
- Never Too Late. Bridge-Logos Publishers. 1975.
- A Glimpse into Glory: A Spirit-Filled Classic. Bridge-Logos Publishers 1979.
- Twilight and Dawn: The Great Physician's Second Opinion. Bridge-Logos Publishers. 1979.
- The Greatest Power in the World: A Spirit-Filled Classic. Bridge-Logos Publishers. 2008.
- Victory in Jesus and the Lord's Healing Touch. Leopold Classic Library. 2015.
- Gifts of the Holy Spirit. Publisher - Kathryn Kuhlman. 2022.

== See also ==
- Benny Hinn
- Aimee Semple McPherson
- John G. Lake
- A.A. Allen
- Sid Roth's It's Supernatural

== Works cited ==
- Buckingham, Jamie (1976). Daughter of Destiny: Kathryn Kuhlman... Her Story. Bridge-Logos Foundation. p. nos. unstated. ISBN 0882703188.
