= Emmanuel Christian Academy =

Emmanuel Christian Academy may refer to:

In the United States

- Emmanuel Christian Academy (Connecticut) — Newington, Connecticut
- Emmanuel Christian Academy (North Carolina) — Leland, North Carolina
- Emmanuel Christian Academy (Ohio) — Springfield, Ohio

Elsewhere

- Emmanuel Christian Academy, Jamaica
