= ECAS =

ECAS may refer to:

- ECAS Theater, in Providence, Rhode Island
- Edmonton Contemporary Artists' Society
- Eight-Color Asteroid Survey
- Emergency Committee of Atomic Scientists
- European Citizen Advice Service
- European Cardiac Arrhythmia Society

== See also ==
- ECA (disambiguation)
