= Tabitha Wa Thuku =

Kenyan visual artist

- Born: 31 October 1963 (age 62); Kiambu District now Kiambu County
- Citizenship: Kenya
- Education: Gitare/Ngewe Primary Schools (1973–1981) Ngara Girls High School (1986–1987) Textiles and Clothing Technology at Kenya Polytechnic (1990–1992) Diploma from Buruburu Institute of Fine Arts (1996–1999)
- Occupation: Visual Artist
- Notable work: Seasons within a Season, Circle Art Gallery, Nairobi, 19 June – 20 July 2024. A Retrospective of Three Artists, Circle Art Gallery, Nairobi, 26 January – 26 February 2022. Art Residence, Fontys Academy, Netherlands. Solo Exhibition, Italy.

Tabitha Wa Thuku (born 31 October 1963) is a Kenyan self-taught visual artist known for her use of acrylics to explore themes of land, belonging, and identity. She often incorporates East African motifs such as animals and landscapes in her work, reflecting her connection to Kenya and her personal experiences of navigating cultural expectations. Beyond her art, she is committed to mentoring emerging artists and supporting cultural development in rural communities

== Early life ==
Wa Thuku was born in Kiambu District (now Kiambu County). She grew up in Gitare, Kiambu County, in the Mt. Kenya region, as the fourth of eight siblings. Her father, a coffee plantation worker and farmer, encouraged her artistic interests, allowing her to use tools from his shed to create art. In contrast, her mother held traditional views, believing that girls should focus on domestic roles rather than pursue art. She attended Gitare/Ngewe Primary Schools (1973–1981), Loreto Limuru Girls High School (1982–1985), and Ngara Girls High School (1986–1987), later studying textiles and Clothing Technology at Kenya Polytechnic (1990–1992) and earning a diploma from Buruburu Institute of Fine Arts (1996–1999).

== Artistic career ==
In 1985, Tabitha wa Thuku was introduced to artist Rosemary Karuga through her sister-in-law, who later connected her with Gallery Watatu. The gallery manager provided quality painting materials and later gave her a task to come with anew aiting the next day. Tabitha, instead delivered a sculpture titled Dwarf, that became her first earnings from art.

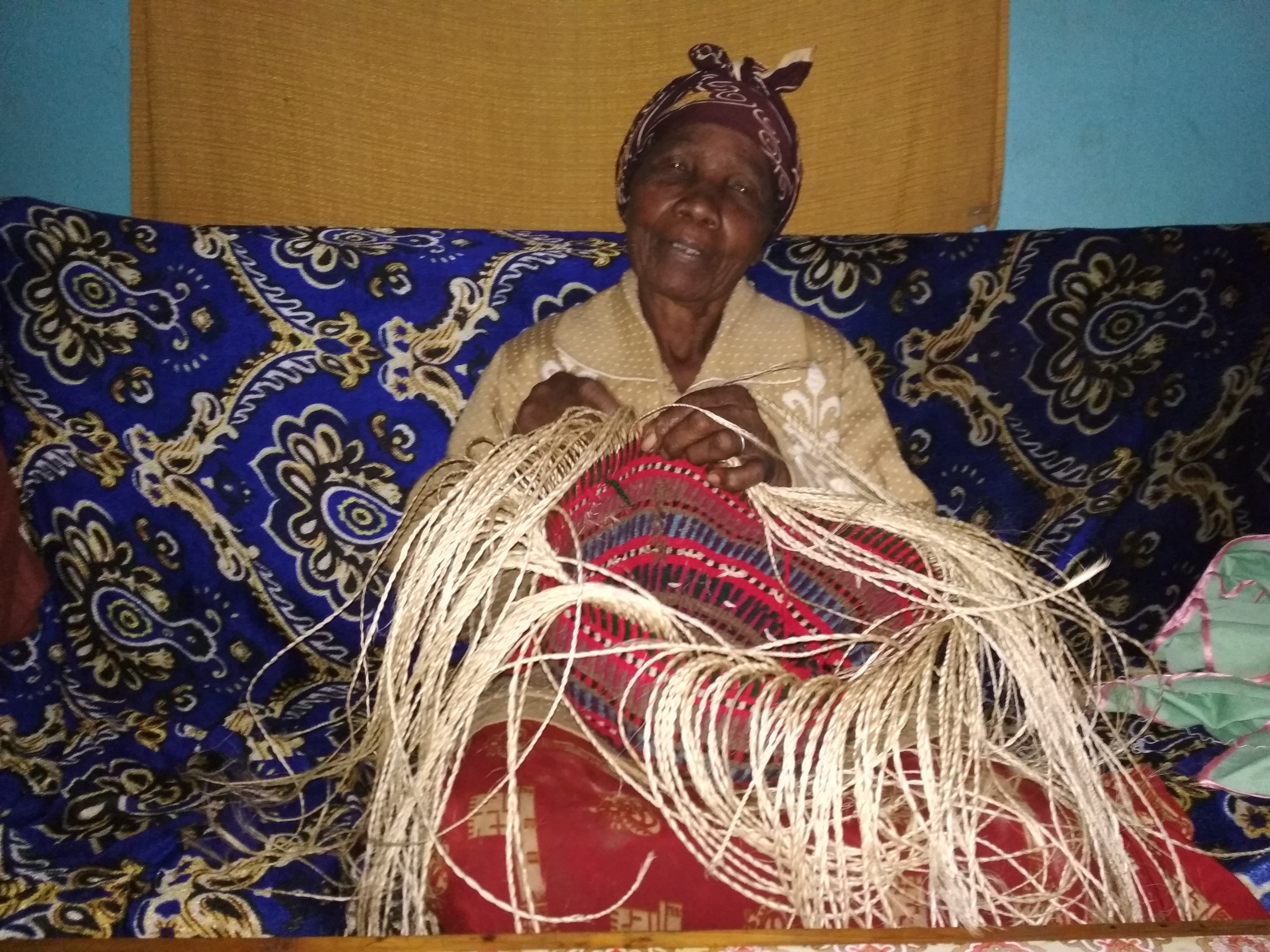
An old woman weaving kiondo bag

In Gallery watatu, Wa Thuku described working in a male-dominated field as both challenging and rewarding. She later met artist Annabel Wanjiku, who provided inspiration. A Catholic priest from the Komboni Missionaries invited wa Thuku to teach vulnerable women in Korogocho slums to craft kiondos (traditional woven bags) and necklaces for skill development and cultural expression.

Wa Thuku developed her practice over three decades, beginning by stitching clothes by hand as a child. Her work features earthy brown tones and diverse techniques emphasizing message over aesthetic beauty, reflecting her resilience as a single mother. She reinvests earnings into her studio and maintains separation between artistry and business.

== Selected exhibitions ==
- Seasons within a Season, Circle Art Gallery, Nairobi, 19 June – 20 July 2024
- A Retrospective of Three Artists, Circle Art Gallery, Nairobi, 26 January – 26 February 2022
- Art Residence, Fontys Academy, Netherlands
- Solo Exhibition, Italy
- Greece: Art Olympics billboards, 2004

== Collections ==
- National Museum of Kenya
- Prime Minister of the Netherlands (2002)
