= RFFC =

RFFC may refer to:

- Redbridge Forest F.C.
- DTDP-4-amino-4,6-dideoxy-D-galactose acyltransferase, an enzyme
