= Amos Tutuola =

Nigerian writer (1920–1997)

Amos Olatubosun Tutuola
- Born: Amos Olatubosun Tutuola Odegbami; 20 June 1920; Abeokuta, Nigeria
- Died: 8 June 1997 (aged 76); Ibadan, Nigeria
- Known for: Author
- Notable work: The Palm-Wine Drinkard; My Life in the Bush of Ghosts
- Spouse: Victoria Alake
- Children: 8

Amos Tutuola (Yoruba: Ámósì Tutùọlá; 20 June 1920 – 8 June 1997) was a Nigerian writer who wrote books based in part on Yoruba folk-tales.

== Early history ==
Amos Olatubosun Tutuola Odegbami was born on 20 June 1920, in Wasinmi, a village just a few miles outside of Abeokuta, Nigeria, where his parents, Charles Tutuola Odegbami and Esther Aina Odegbami, who were Yoruba Christian cocoa farmers, lived. Wasinmi was a small farming village founded between the years 1845 and 1880 by constituents of the Egba subethnic group from Abeokuta. Tutuola's father and grandfather belonged to this subethnic group.

Amos was the youngest son of his father; his mother was his father's third wife. His grandfather the Odafin of Egbaland, Chief Odegbami (c. 1842–1936), patriarch of the Odegbami clan, was a chieftain of the Egba people and a traditional worshipper of the Yoruba religion. His title, "Odafin" (literally "the establisher of laws" or "lawgiver" in Yoruba), signified that he had an administrative position within the traditional administration of Egbaland, and that he was one of the Iwarefa of the Ogboni.

When Amos was seven years old, in 1927, he became a servant to F. O. Monu, an Igbo man, who sent him to the Salvation Army primary school in lieu of wages. At age 12, he attended the Anglican Central School in Abeokuta. His brief education was limited to six years (from 1934 to 1939). After his grandfather's death in 1936, most members of the chief's family decided to adopt the European style of naming and take his name, Odegbami, as their last name. However, several other family members, including Amos, decided to take their father's name, Tutuola, instead. When his father died in 1939, Tutuola left school to train as a blacksmith, the trade he practised from 1942 to 1945 for the Royal Air Force in Nigeria during WWII. He subsequently tried a number of other vocations, including selling bread and acting as messenger for the Nigerian Department of Labour. In 1947, he married Victoria Alake, with whom he had four sons and four daughters; he would also marry 3 other wives. He is the uncle of the Nigerian footballers Segun Odegbami and Wole Odegbami.

== Writing ==
Despite his short formal education, Tutuola wrote his novels in English. In 1956, after he had written his first three books and become internationally famous, he joined the Nigerian Broadcasting Corporation in Ibadan, Western Nigeria as a storekeeper. Tutuola also became one of the founders of the Mbari Club, the writers' and publishers' organization. In 1979, he held a visiting research fellowship at the University of Ife (now Obafemi Awolowo University) at Ile-Ife, Nigeria, and in 1983 he was an associate of the International Writing Program at the University of Iowa. In retirement he divided his time between residences Ibadan and Ago-Odo.

Tutuola died at the age of 76 on 8 June 1997 from hypertension and diabetes.

Many of his papers, letters, and holographic manuscripts have been collected at the Harry Ransom Humanities Research Center at the University of Texas, Austin.

Tutuola's works have been translated into 11 languages, including French, German, Russian, and Polish. Some translators, notably Raymond Queneau (French) and Ernestyna Skurjat (Polish), deliberately adjusted the grammar and syntax of the translations to reflect the occasionally atypical language of Tutuola's original prose.

=== The Palm Wine Drinkard ===
Tutuola's most famous novel, The Palm-Wine Drinkard and his Dead Palm-Wine Tapster in the Deads' Town was first published in 1952 in London by Faber and Faber, then translated and published in Paris as L'Ivrogne dans la brousse by Raymond Queneau in 1953. Poet Dylan Thomas brought it to wide attention, calling it "brief, thronged, grisly and bewitching". Although the book was praised in England and the United States, it faced severe criticism in Tutuola's native Nigeria. Part of this criticism was due to his use of "broken English" and "primitive" style, which supposedly promoted the Western stereotype of "African backwardness". This line of criticism has, however, lost steam. In the opinion of Taban Lo Liyong:

Now, in all that he has done, Amos Tutuola is not sui generis. Is he ungrammatical? Yes. But James Joyce is more ungrammatical than Tutuola. Ezekiel Mphahlele has often said and written that African writers are doing violence to English. Violence? Has Joyce not done more violence to the English Language? Mark Twain's Huckleberry Finn is written in seven dialects, he tells us. It is acknowledged a classic. We accept it, forget that it has no "grammar", and go ahead to learn his "grammar" and what he has to tell us. Let Tutuola write "no grammar" and the hyenas and jackals whine and growl. Let Gabriel Okara write a "no grammar" Okolo. They are mum. Why? Education drives out of the mind superstition, daydreaming, building of castles in the air, cultivation of yarns, and replaces them with a rational practical mind, almost devoid of imagination. Some of these minds having failed to write imaginative stories, turn to that aristocratic type of criticism which magnifies trivialities beyond their real size. They fail to touch other virtues in a work because they do not have the imagination to perceive these mysteries. Art is arbitrary. Anybody can begin his own style. Having begun it arbitrarily, if he persists to produce in that particular mode, he can enlarge and elevate it to something permanent, to something other artists will come to learn and copy, to something the critics will catch up with and appreciate.

Omolara Ogundipe-Leslie in her own reassessment wrote in The Journal of Commonwealth Studies:

What commands acclaim is Tutuola's use of his materials, chosen from all and sundry, and minted to make something beautiful, new and undeniably his own. He has handled his material with all of the skill of the good story teller and he has been able to endow it with the qualities of a "well-told-tale". His denigrators who think it devastating to name him a mere folktale-teller must realize that not all folktale-tellers are necessarily good. In The Palm-Wine Drinkard, Tutuola has infused the life of his hybrid with the energies of a well-wrought tale. There is the urgency in the telling, the rapidity, indispensable to the Quest-motif, with which life unrolls itself; the fertility of incidents; the successful maintenance of our interest through the varying scenes. And the good-story teller is ever present in The Palm-Wine Drinkard, speaking to us in warm human tones, genial, good-natured and unpretentious.

O. R. Dathorne additionally said:

Tutuola deserves to be considered seriously because his work represents an intentional attempt to fuse folklore with modern life. In this way he is unique, not only in Africa, where the sophisticated African writer is incapable of this tenuous and yet controlled connection, but in Europe as well, where this kind of writing is impossible.

Wole Soyinka wrote in 1963:

Of all his novels, The Palm-Wine Drinkard remains his best and the least impeachable. This book, apart from the work of D. O. Fagunwa, who writes in Yoruba, is the earliest instance of the new Nigerian writer gathering multifarious experience under, if you like, the two cultures, and exploiting them in one extravagant, confident whole.

The Palm-Wine Drinkard was followed by My Life in the Bush of Ghosts in 1954 and then several other books in which Tutuola continued to explore Yoruba traditions and folklore, although none of the subsequent works managed to match the success of The Palm Wine Drinkard. His 1958 work, The Brave African Huntress, was illustrated by Ben Enwonwu.

In 1988/89 The Kenyan artist Rosemary Karuga Illustrate several Tutuola's novel, it resulted 24 large artworks shown in France beside a theatre play inspired by "The palm-wine drinkard". This Play/Exhibition has been produced by Theatre Ecalate Cie directed by Gilles Zaepffel

== Selected bibliography ==
- The Palm-Wine Drinkard (1952)
- My Life in the Bush of Ghosts (1954)
- Simbi and the Satyr of the Dark Jungle (1955)
- The Brave African Huntress (1958)
- Feather Woman of the Jungle (1962)
- Ajaiyi and his Inherited Poverty (1967)
- The Witch-Herbalist of the Remote Town (1981)
- The Wild Hunter in the Bush of the Ghosts (1982)
- Yoruba Folktales (1986)
- Pauper, Brawler and Slanderer (1987)
- The Village Witch Doctor and Other Stories (1990)

== Tributes ==
Brian Eno and David Byrne named their 1981 album My Life in the Bush of Ghosts after Tutuola's second novel.

In 2015, the Society of Young Nigerian Writers, under the leadership of Wole Adedoyin, founded the Amos Tutuola Literary Society, aimed at promoting and reading Tutuola's works.

In 2021, Will Alexander published a long poem – 'Based on the Bush of Ghosts' – in honour of Tutuola Refractive Africa, the collection of which this was part, was subsequently listed as a finalist for the Pulitzer Prize for Poetry.

In 2021, Aderemi Adegbite, the Nigerian contemporary artist-curator and poet, inaugurated the Tutuola Institute - The Yoruba Cultural Institute, an artistic and cultural intervention legally recognized in Nigeria as a Limited by Guarantee Charity.
