= Xiong Yan (dissident) =

Chinese-American human rights activist, military officer and Protestant chaplain

- 熊焱
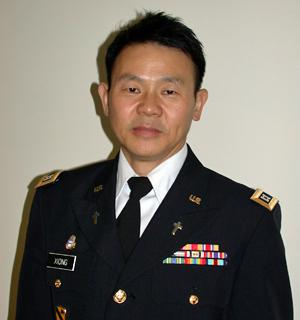
- Xiong in Army Service Uniform
- Born: 1 September 1964 (age 62); Shuangfeng, Hunan, China
- Education: Peking University; Gordon-Conwell Theological Seminary; University of North Carolina; Covenant Theological Seminary; Trinity Evangelical Divinity School
- Military career
- Allegiance: United States
- Branch: United States Army
- Service years: 1994–1996; 1996–2003 (Reserve); 2003–2021
- Rank: Major
- Units: Fort Bliss; Warrant Officer Career College, Fort Rucker; 1st Cavalry Division
- Conflicts: Operation Iraqi Freedom
- Other work: Student protest leader

Xiong Yan (Chinese: 熊焱; born 1 September 1964) is a Chinese-American human rights activist, military officer, and Protestant chaplain. He was a dissident involved in 1989 Tiananmen Square protests. Xiong Yan studied at Peking University Law School from 1986 to 1989. He came to the United States of America as a political refugee in 1992, and later became a chaplain in U.S. Army, serving in Iraq. Xiong Yan is the author of three books, and has earned six degrees. He ran for Congress in New York's 10th congressional district in 2022, and his campaign was reportedly attacked by agents of China's Ministry of State Security.

== Dissident ==
Growing up in Hunan, Xiong moved to Beijing to pursue graduate level studies in law at Peking University. He was a probationary member of the Chinese Communist Party. While at Peking University, he was a member of Caodi Salon, which Liu Gang had organized.

Xiong was a student leader during the 1989 Tiananmen Square protests and massacre. At one point, he called himself "general commander". After the military crackdown and massacre at Tiananmen Square, he was placed on China's most wanted list. Captured in late June 1989 at Datong, he was returned to Beijing under armed guard of hundreds of soldiers. Afterwards, he was detained for 19 months at maximum security Qincheng Prison without being charged with a crime.

After his release, Yan's academic credentials were stripped from him, and he was unable to obtain identification. During this period he converted to Christianity. He fled mainland China in May 1992. (Note: Xiong was encouraged by an English individual not to seek asylum in the United Kingdom, as doing so might upset China-United Kingdom relations.) After being granted political asylum he moved to the United States in June 1992, initially moving to the Los Angeles area. He remains a fugitive of the People's Republic of China.

== After leaving China ==
Moving to Boston, Xiong studied English at Harvard University and was accepted into its divinity school but declined its admission. He later attended Gordon–Conwell Theological Seminary; eventually he earned a D.Min. degree from the same seminary in 2009. He is active in the overseas China democracy movement. In 2009, he made a trip to Hong Kong to attend a candlelight vigil on the June 4 anniversary of the Tiananmen crackdown. It was estimated that 150,000 people attended the vigil. This was the first time, within a 17-year time span, for Xiong to return to China since 1992.

In 2010, Chai Ling and he were panel members at a discussion on China's One-child policy held at Rayburn House Office Building.

In 2015, after receiving word that his mother's health was failing, Xiong appealed to mainland China to be allowed to return to see her before she dies. He was detained when trying to cross into China from Hong Kong, and was unable to see her before she died. In 2017 Xiong agreed with the account of a declassified United Kingdom diplomatic cable, which estimated about 10,000 civilians were killed in the 1989 massacre.

Xiong Yan was listed as a member of the preparatory committee of the Wang Dan's June 4 Memorial Museum; in February 2022, he published a statement protesting against the inclusion of his name in the committee. Later on in that same month, Xiong Yan participated in an event organized by an overseas Chinese group against the June 4th Memorial Museum; Xiong later said that he was "duped" to appear to oppose the creation of the museum by a saboteur with ties to mainland China.

=== Military service ===
Xiong went on to join the United States Army while working on a second bachelor's degree, studying at the University of North Carolina. He graduated with a B.A. in English literature in 1998. By 1999, he was a sergeant in the Army Reserve. He went on to earn an M.A. degree from the Covenant Theological Seminary in 2001 and a Master of Arts in religion (M.A.R.) degree from Trinity Evangelical Divinity School in 2002. Serving eight years in the Army Reserve, he was commissioned as an officer in 2003. He serves as a Protestant chaplain of the Evangelical Church Alliance denomination. In 2010, he was a chaplain at the Warrant Officer Career College on Fort Rucker. In 2014, Xiong was stationed at Fort Bliss.

Xiong served two tours in Iraq. In 2017, Xiong was stationed in Hawaii. By 2021, Xiong had retired from the United States Army.

=== Congressional campaigns ===
In 2022, Xiong ran for Congress in New York's 10th congressional district as a Democrat. He lost the primary to Dan Goldman. The United States Department of Justice has reported that his campaign was attacked by agents of China's Ministry of State Security, including surveillance, and discussion of possible smear campaigns, honey trapping and physical attacks.

Xiong filed in June 2025 to run for Congress in New York's 6th Congressional district, to challenge incumbent Grace Meng in the 2026 election. As of the end of 2025, his campaign had received no financial contributions, as reported to the Federal Election Commission.

== Personal life ==
Xiong is married to Qian Liyun. She was arrested along with Shen Tong due to activity relating to the Democracy for China Fund in 1992; they were released and sent to the United States. In the United States, Qian also joined the Army.

== See also ==
- Human Rights in China
- Laogai
