= Wasinmi, Nigeria =

Wasinmi Wasinmi Wasimi
- Rural area
- Nicknames: Wasinmi Ọlọ́ṣẹ, Wasinmi Orile, Wasinmi Igbó
- Location in Nigeria
- Coordinates: 6°59′N 3°13′E
- Country: Nigeria
- State: Ogun
- LGA: Ewekoro

Government
  - Oniwasinmi of Wasinmi: Oba Emmanuel Bàbátunde Ọṣuntogun
- Time zone: UTC+1 (WAT)
- Climate: Tropical savanna climate (Aw)
- Website: http://www.ogunstate.gov.ng/

Wasinmi or Wasimi (Yoruba: Wasinmi) is an Egba town located on the Lagos-Abeokuta Expressway in Ewekoro LGA of Ogun State. It is a few miles from Abeokuta. It is home to one of the oldest churches in the area, St. Michael's Anglican Church, and home to Odegbami International College and Sports Academy.

== History ==
The name Wasinmi comes from the phrase in the Yoruba language, wá sinmi, which means come and rest. It was shortened to Wasinmi, and it was founded between the years 1845-1880. It started as a small farming settlement for mostly Egba people of Abeokuta. When the town of Abeokuta was founded in 1830, there were many waves of migrants from all over Yorubaland that arrived in Abeokuta. This included Owu refugees from the Owu-Ibadan Wars, Saros from Sierra Leone that returned after being kidnapped and taken into slavery, and Christian missionaries. Though the area was occupied by Egba Alake people from Abeokuta already from Egba Erunbe, Igbore, Ijeun, Igbein etc populating several villages and nearby farmsteads, Wasinmi served them all as a market place due to its geographical centrality and a meeting point for all Egba stock than a permanent place of residence. As the market grew in size, it became a major attraction for farmers everywhere, including Ijebu and Ijesha farmers and traders who later settled down in nearby villages for ease of transportation of goods and trade. Many men then sought to settle famimlies and establish plantations and farms nearby, these consisted several ethnics including Egbado, Gbagura, Owu and Oke-Ona stock of the Egba ethnics. Wasinmi equally served as a cheaper produce market to Abeokuta and environs as Abeokuta became increasingly urbane. Such produce that were unavailable in the mostly urban town of Abeokuta were available in affordable prices at Wasinmi. As the migrations continued the market grew into a burstling town and the need for religious divergence also manifested. Early Christians facing persecution and seeking newlands to practice their faiths found Wasinmi a place of choice, though the influence of the powerful Ogboni groups persisted under the superintendence of the Iledi at Ijumo Ologboni, which served as the custodian of tradition across the length and breath of the vastlands on the outskirts of Abeokuta extending far out into Iro, Ifo and Isheri. Certain groups of people, who also included Muslims and Christians seeking a separate place to practice their faith, planted churches and mosques. The Catholic Church, the African Church etc all sought to minister to the usual market crowds and the inhabitants of the fastly developing and fledgling town. The foundation of the new town, Wasinmi, was therefore laid. The multi-ethnics of the Egba Alake, Gbagura, Owu, and Oke-Ona continued to rule the town rotationally till date. Wasinmi is immediately bounded by four villages, namely; Sodeji, Village, Erunbe Village, Arigbajo Village and part of Wasinmi Olose Village.

Administrative Style: The first Baale of Wasinmi was installed around 1892 by a joint administrative style similar to what existed in Abeokuta. The founding fathers agreed to a rotational governance and administrative style which unanimously united all the villages and gave them hope. In recent history, about 10 decades ago and under the rotational administration, the Egba Alake stock provided Baale Epeolu, succeeded by Baale Oshola also of Egba Alake stock, he was succeeded by an Ijesha man, who was then the oldest man in the town, his tenure was succeeded by Baale Akintunde of the Owu stock, followed by Baale Adeaga, also of Owu stock. Baale Abiola was the first Egba Oke-Ona to administer the town and was succeeded by Baale Babatunde Osuntogun of Egba Gbagura, through whom the Baaleship was upgraded to a coronet monarchical system under the Part 2 Obaship of Ogun State. Oba Babatunde Osuntogun, the Oniwasinmi of Wasinmi joined his ancestors on Monday, the 13th day of December, 2021. Wasinmi continues to thrive and has become an economic and trading post, holding immensely potentialities for the good people of Ogun State. Agriculture however remains the mainstay of the economy of the town.

In the early 1900s, the British administration built a train station in the village, which was a major site of the Adubi War in 1918, also known as the Egba Uprising. St. Michael's Anglican Church was the first church built in the village by newly converted natives, most likely in c. 1920.

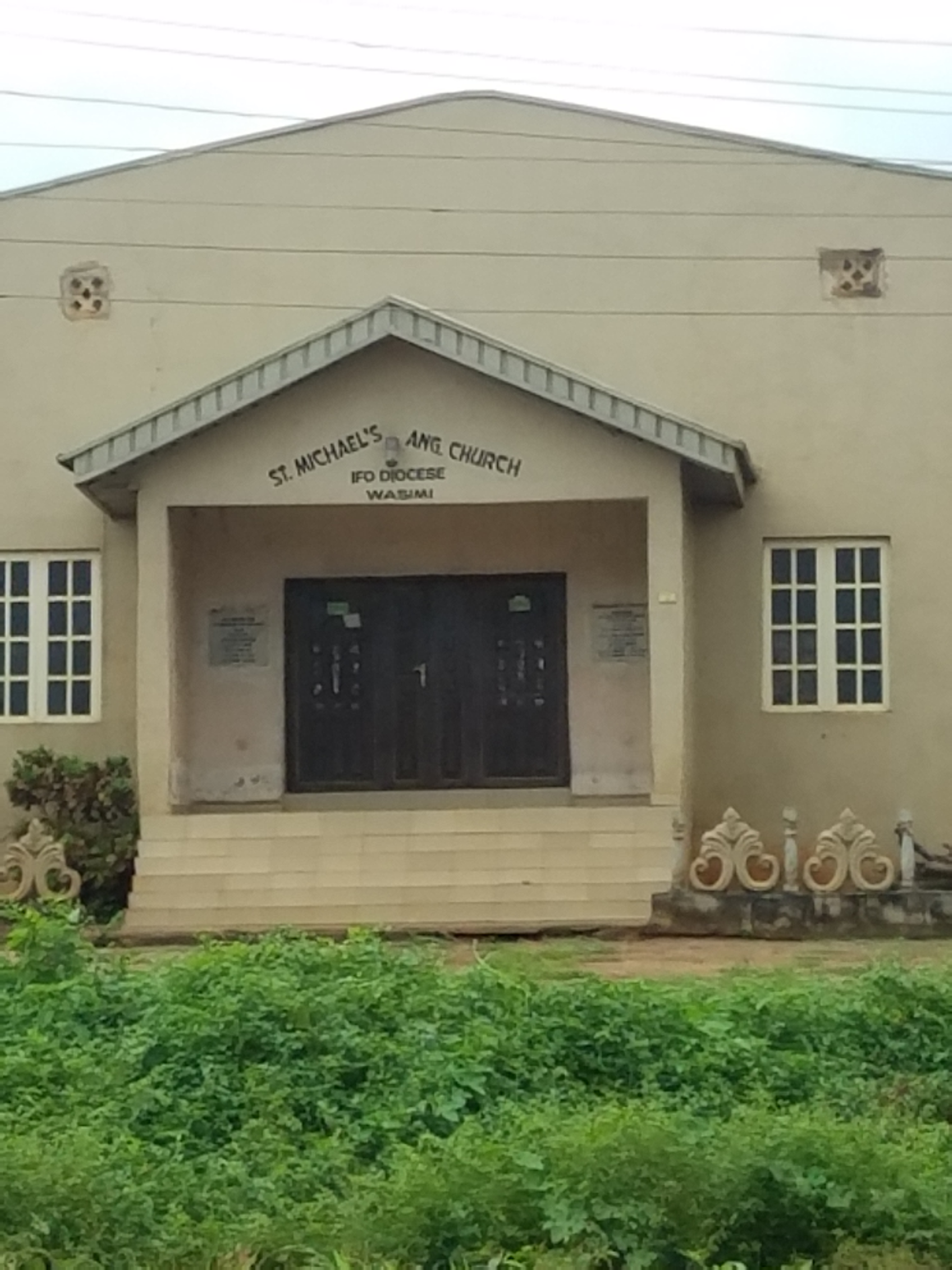
St. Michael's Anglican Church, one of the oldest Anglican churches in Wasimi.

Odegbami, the Odofin of Ago-Odo, an Egba-Oke-Ona township, is the ancestor of Amos Tutuola, and the Odegbami family (including Segun Odegbami and Wole Odegbami), a very prominent and influential family in Wasinmi. Odegbami was a religious leader and appointed administrator as detailed in Tutuola's book The Palm Wine Drinkard. Other notable and influential families include the family of Chief James Ifayanran Enitan, the Oluawo of Iledi Ogboni which administers traditional religion and governance over several villages and towns including Ijumo Ologboni, Gbangba, Tepona, Jibode, Ilaho, Onibontuje, Ajade, Loti, and several surrounding villages. He was the father of Elijah Olumide Enitan and ancestor to Olukayode Enitan (Senior Advocate of Nigeria). Wasinmi is gradually growing into a mix use commercial precinct with industries and factories cropping up across the land. An integrated farm, TeeHigh Farms is located in Wasinmi.

== Sections ==
Each small group of clans in Wasinmi has their own section, each with a unique name. Four of these sections are Wasinmi Igbó, Wasinmi Oríle, Wasinmi Alaafia, and Wasinmi Ọlọṣẹ.

== Future ==
The Ogun State government has started construction to build an international airport in Wasimi. The airport was meant to be finished in March 2019, but President Buhari has continued to commission the former governor's projects. Many local Wasinmi farmers were angry at the confiscation of land and were given monetary compensations.

== Notable people ==
- Amos Tutuola
- Segun Odegbami
- Wole Odegbami
- May7ven
