= Engineering Critical Assessment =

Engineering Critical Assessment (ECA) is a procedure by which the safety of a welded structure with defects or flaws can be determined. ECAs utilize the material properties and expected stress history to determine a flaw acceptance criteria which will ensure that welds will not fail during the construction or service life of the welded structure. The assessment can be used before the structure is in use, or during in-service inspection, to determine whether a given weld is in need of repair. ECAs are used throughout the energy, manufacturing, and infrastructure industries. ECAs are based heavily upon fracture mechanics principles, and reflect an improvement over traditional methods of weld quality assurance, which can be arbitrary or overly conservative.

== Background ==
During welding, defects or flaws can develop. In some cases, these flaws could potentially affect the integrity of the weld, resulting in failure by fatigue, creep, brittle fracture, or yielding. Therefore, codes to determine weld quality must be developed. Traditionally, welding codes have been based on workmanship criteria. These criteria are determined empirically, typically by estimating the level of weld quality expected from a skilled welder. While these criteria have been reliable historically, improvements made in welding technology and materials science are not taken into account. As a result, over time, workmanship criteria have become increasingly conservative. This conservatism results in unnecessary repairs, which can increase construction costs and can yield undesirable residual stresses at the location of the repair weld.

Beginning in the late 1970s to early 1980s, engineering critical assessments began to emerge as an alternative to traditional workmanship criteria. These ECAs relied heavily on recent developments in the field of fracture mechanics. Where workmanship criteria were developed with a limited understanding of material characteristics, and considered only the length of a given weld flaw, these ECA-based flaw acceptance criteria considered additional factors such as:

- The stress history of the weld, including all cyclic and static stresses expected throughout the life cycle of the welded structure
- The strength of the base metal and weld material
- The fracture toughness (measured via Crack tip opening displacement testing or Charpy impact testing) of the base metal and the weld material
- The flaw orientation (e.g., measurement of flaw length and flaw height, as opposed to flaw length only)

Together, these additional factors allow for more generous flaw acceptance criteria, resulting in fewer unnecessarily repaired welds.

To comply with the flaw acceptance criteria developed during ECA, non-destructive examination must be utilized. Ultrasonic testing is typically used due to its high accuracy, ability to identify flaw size and orientation, and its ability to provide feedback instantly.

== ECA for oil and gas pipelines ==
ECA-based flaw acceptance criteria are commonly used in the oil and gas industry, particularly with regard to qualification of girth welds on cross-country oil and gas transmission pipelines. This is because girth welds are typically uniform from weld to weld, allowing construction contractors to utilize mechanized welding. Mechanized welding increases productivity over manual welding techniques by allowing for better, more uniform control over weld characteristics. ECA-based flaw acceptance criteria are able to take advantage of the high strength and toughness of the welds produced to develop more generous flaw acceptance criteria. In addition, the flaws created during mechanized welding are typically oriented differently than flaws developed from manual welding. ECA-based flaw acceptance criteria more effectively assess these flaws, by considering flaw orientation, rather than just flaw length.

=== Standards ===
Several standards specific to ECAs for oil and gas pipelines have been developed. The most commonly used of these are API 1104 Appendix A, API 579, CSA Z662 Annex K, and BS 7910. The standard used depends primarily on the location of the pipeline being installed. The standards differ in methodology and in extreme cases, can result in significantly different flaw acceptance criteria. However, for typical operating conditions, the criteria are easy enough to follow that practical differences between the standards are small.
