= Africa General Service Medal =

Campaign medal of the United Kingdom

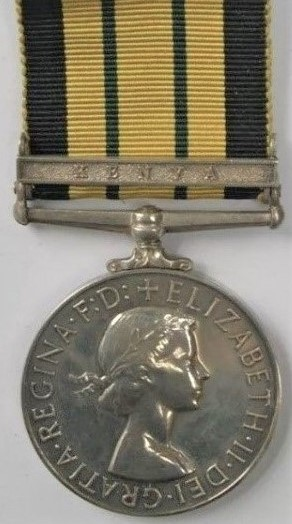
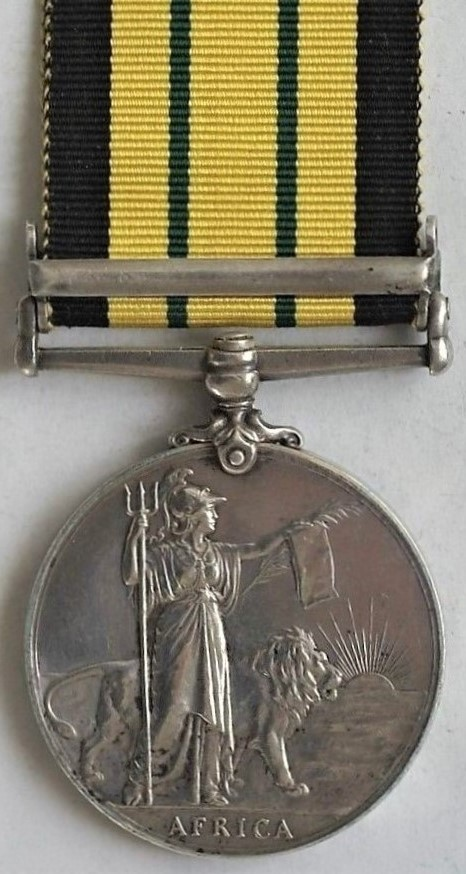
- Obverse and reverse of the medal
- Type: Campaign medal
- Awarded for: Campaign service
- Presented by: UK and Commonwealth
- Eligibility: British and African forces
- Campaign: Africa
- Clasps: 45 awarded
- Established: 1902
- Ribbon bar

The Africa General Service Medal, established in 1902, was a campaign medal of the United Kingdom. It was awarded for minor campaigns that took place in tropical Africa between 1900 and 1956, with a total of forty five clasps issued. The medal is never seen without a clasp and some are very rare. Most medals were granted to British Colonial Auxiliary Forces units, including the King's African Rifles and the West African Frontier Force. The only campaigns where European personnel were present in any numbers were the various Somaliland campaigns, (including to the Royal Navy), and in Kenya.

== Description ==
- The medal is 36 millimetres (1.4 in) in diameter and in silver, although the King Edward VII version was also awarded in bronze to native carriers who supported a number of the campaigns.
- The obverse bears the uncrowned head, name and title of the reigning monarch.
- The reverse shows a symbolic design depicting Britannia standing with a lion and offering peace and law to Africa as a new day breaks, with the word AFRICA below. Save for the wording, the reverse design is the same as for the East and Central Africa Medal. The designer was George de Saulles
- The number, name and regiment of the recipient are inscribed on the rim of the medal in various styles.
- The 32 millimetres (1.3 in) wide ribbon is yellow with black edges and two narrow green stripes towards the centre.
- From 1920 a bronze oak leaf emblem is worn on the medal ribbon to signify a mention in dispatches for a campaign for which the medal was awarded.

=== Obverse variations ===
The medal was awarded with one of three obverse designs.

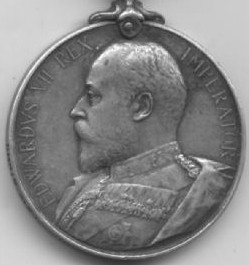
Edward VII (Campaigns of 1901–10)

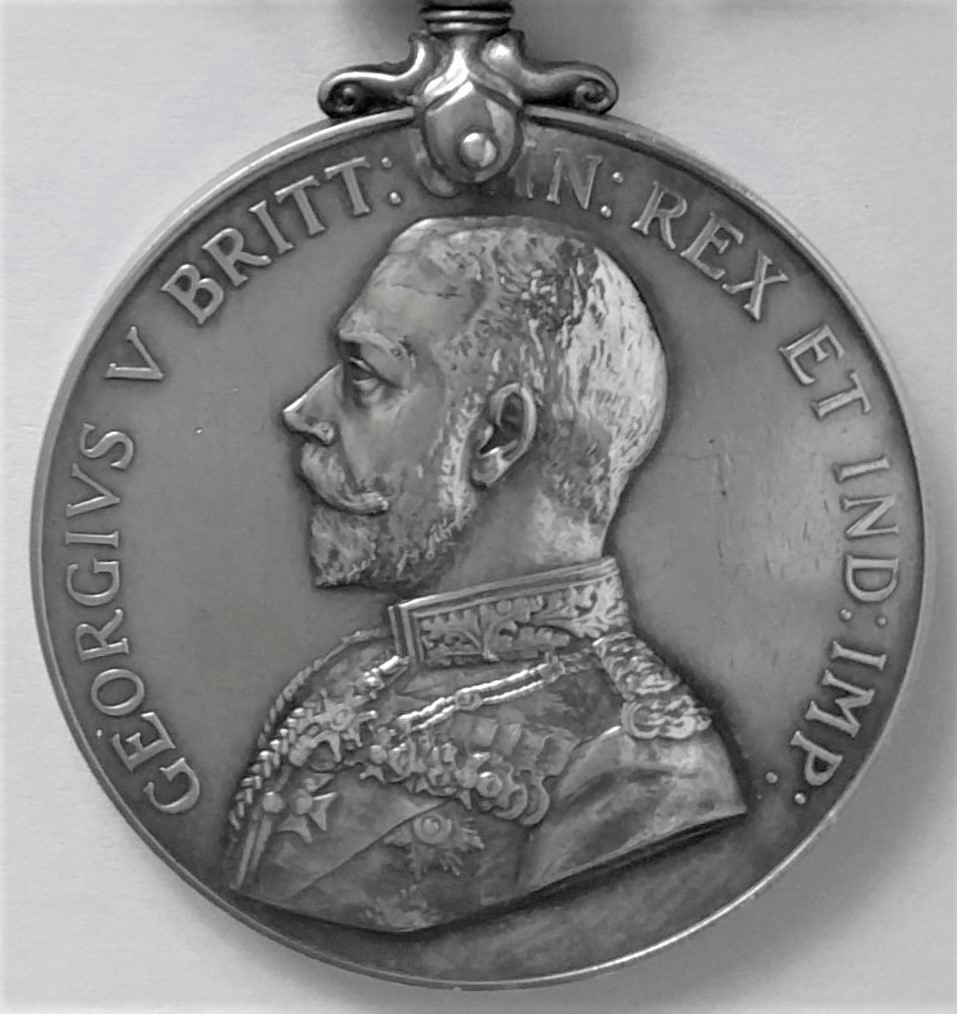
George V (Campaigns of 1913–20)

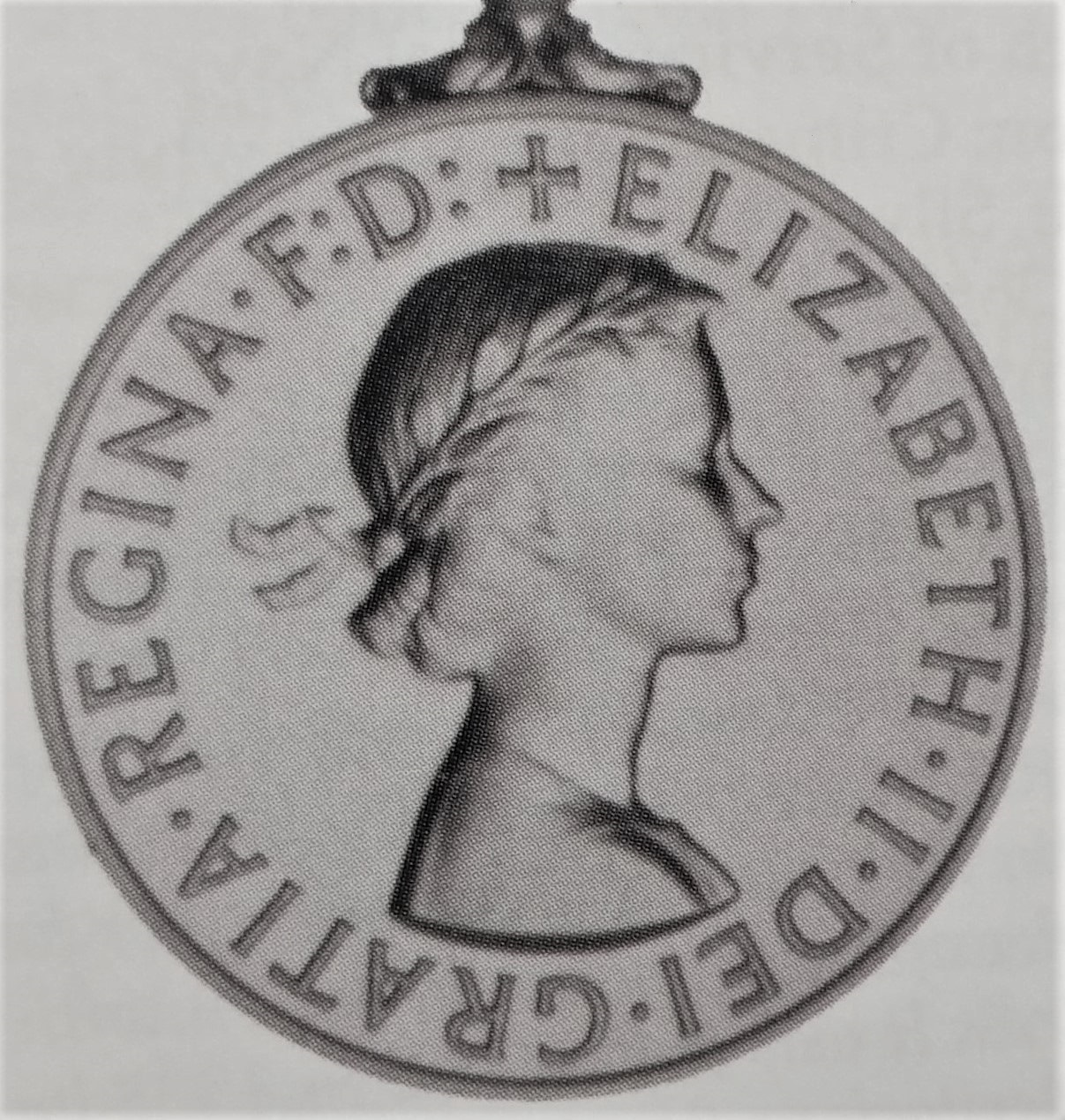
Elizabeth II (Kenya, 1952–56)

== Clasps ==
The medal was never awarded without a clasp. While the majority of medals were awarded with one clasp, as many as seven clasps were earned by some African recipients.
The forty five clasps authorised are listed below.

Clasp	Notes
Edward VII obverse	
N. Nigeria (July 1900 – Sept 1901); N. Nigeria 1902; N. Nigeria 1903; N Nigeria 1903–04; N Nigeria 1904; N Nigeria 1906; S. Nigeria (March – May 1901); S. Nigeria 1902; S. Nigeria 1902–03; S. Nigeria 1903; S. Nigeria 1903–04; S. Nigeria 1904; S. Nigeria 1904–05; S. Nigeria 1905; S. Nigeria 1905–06; East Africa 1902; East Africa 1904; East Africa 1905; East Africa 1906; West Africa 1906; West Africa 1908; West Africa 1909–10; Uganda 1900	For minor operations against lawless tribes with, in most cases, one clasp covering more than one operation. Given the small scale of expeditions, the number of each clasp awarded was small, varying from under 100 to about 1,000. Locally recruited troops were employed in all cases, led by British officers and senior NCOs, with no British Army units present. A number of British civilians also received the medal, including doctors and political officers. Recipients of the West Africa 1908 clasp included 43 German colonial troops from neighbouring Cameroon, who assisted in the operation. About 400 medals for Nigeria 1903–04 were awarded in bronze to native carriers who accompanied the expedition.
Somaliland 1901; Somaliland 1902–04; Jidballi (10 January 1904); Somaliland 1908–10	For participation in a number of Somaliland campaigns against rebels led by Mohammed Abdullah Hassan, nicknamed the 'Mad Mullah' by the British. As well as locally raised forces and the King's African Rifles, participants included British and Indian army units and the Royal and Indian Navies. The Jidballi clasp, awarded to those involved in the defeat of Hassan on 10 January 1904, was always given with the Somaliland 1902–04 clasp. The three dated clasps were also awarded in bronze to non-combatant native levies and carriers.
B.C.A. 1899–1900	A number of small operations in British Central Africa involving King's African Rifles, Indian and locally raised troops.
Jubaland (Nov 1900 – April 1901)	For operations in what is now south Somalia involving the Royal Navy, as well as Indian and local African troops. A number of awards were made in bronze.
Gambia (Jan – March 1901)	Awarded to King's African Rifles and the West India Regiment, as well as a number to the Royal Navy.
Aro 1901–1902	This expedition in South Nigeria consisted mainly of Nigerian troop as well as a small number from the Royal Navy.
Lango 1901	Awarded to the King's African Rifles for a small expedition against Sudanese mutineers in what is now Uganda.
Kissi 1905	Most awards were to the West African Frontier Force in a dispute with the Kissi people in Sierra Leone.
Nandi 1905–06	For members of the King's African Rifles and the East Africa Police involved in a conflict with the Nandi people in what is now Kenya.
George V obverse	Those already in possession of the King Edward medal received the new clasp only.
Shimber Berris, 1914–15	For two brief British Somaliland campaigns in November 1914 and February 1915, involving the Somaliland Camel Corps, King's African Rifles and Indian Army.
Nyasaland 1915	Granted mainly to the King's African Rifles and local volunteers for service during the Chilembwe uprising in the Shire Highlands.
East Africa 1913; East Africa 1913–14; East Africa 1914; East Africa 1915	For minor operations against lawless tribes in what are now Uganda and Kenya. The small scale of operations meant that only a few hundred of each clasp were awarded, mainly to the King's African Rifles and the East Africa Police, with no British Army units involved. Operations against German forces from 1914 were rewarded with the appropriate World War I campaign medals.
Jubaland 1917–18	Awarded in silver to the King's African Rifles, and in bronze to porters, for operations against the Aulihan tribe along the Jubba River in what is now South Somalia.
East Africa 1918	For local forces employed in operations against the Turkana and other tribes near the South Sudan border.
Nigeria 1918	Granted to Nigerian troops engaged during a revolt by the Egba people in South Nigeria known as the Adubi War.
Somaliland 1920	Last of the campaigns against Mohammed Abdullah Hassan, awarded to local forces, the King's African Rifles, Indian Army troops, the Royal Navy and the RAF.
Elizabeth II obverse	
Kenya	For 90 days service between 21 October 1952 and 17 November 1956 during the Mau Mau Uprising by the Kikuyu people. A large number of British regiments, Royal Air Force squadrons and locally recruited forces received the medal with this clasp, which is by far the most common for this medal.
