= Adubi War =

Conflict in the British Colony and Protectorate of Nigeria

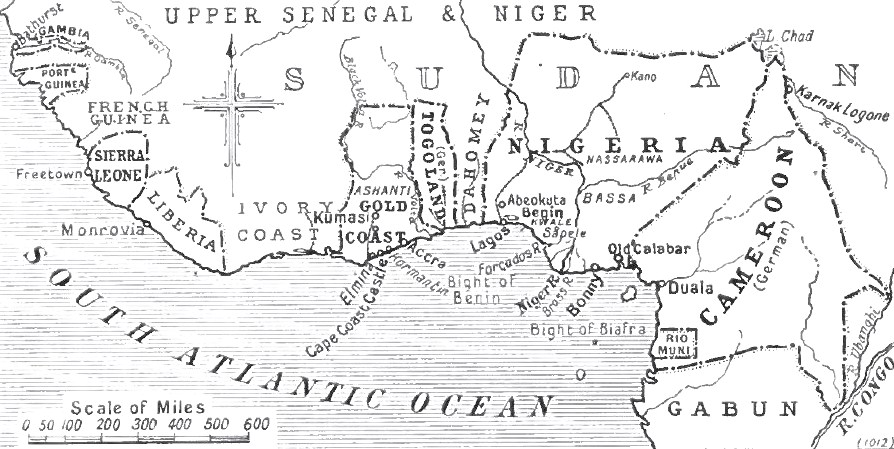
- Map of West Africa in 1914
Date	June 13, 1918 – July 1918
Location	Colony and Protectorate of Nigeria
Result	British victory

Belligerents
(United Kingdom of Great Britain and Ireland) British Empire: British Nigeria	Egba rebels

Commanders and leaders
(United Kingdom of Great Britain and Ireland) Unknown (Nigeria) Unknown	Unknown

Strength
Unknown	30,000

Casualties and losses
2 killed	598 killed 70 Egba chiefs arrested

The Adubi War (known locally as Ogun Adubi or Egba Uprising) was a conflict in June and July 1918 in the British Colony and Protectorate of Nigeria ostensibly because of the imposition of colonial taxation. Direct taxes were introduced by the colonial government along with existing forced labour obligations and fees. On 7 June, the British arrested 70 Egba chiefs and issued an ultimatum that resisters should lay down their arms, pay the taxes and obey the local leadership.

== The War ==
On 11 June, a party of soldiers, recently returned from East Africa, was brought in to help police in the area to keep the peace. On 13 June, Egba rebels pulled up railway lines at Agbesi and derailed a train. Other rebels demolished the train station at Wasinmi and murdered the British agent, the Oba Osile, David Sokunbi Karunwi II, the African leader of the north-eastern Egba district. Hostilities between the 30,000 rebels and colonial troops continued for about three weeks at Otite, Tappona, Mokoloki and Lalako but by 10 July, the rebellion had been put down and the leaders were killed or arrested.

== Aftermath ==
About 600 people were killed, including the British agent and the Oba Osile, although this may have been due to a land dispute and unconnected to the uprising. The incident led to the abolition of Abeokutan independence in 1918 and the introduction of forced labour in the region; imposition of the direct taxes was postponed until 1925. Military personnel who suppressed the revolt received the Africa General Service Medal.
