= Rosemary Karuga =

Kenyan visual artist (1928–2021)

Rosemary Namuli Karuga
- Born: 19 June 1928; Meru, Kenya
- Died: February 9, 2021 (aged 92); Dublin, Ireland
- Occupations: Visual artist, teacher

Rosemary Namuli Karuga (19 June 1928 – 9 February 2021) was a Kenyan visual artist. In 2017, she was named Artist of the Month by the National Museums of Kenya. She is known to be the first woman artist to have studied at Makerere University.

== Early life and education ==
Karuga was born on 19 June 1928 in Meru, Kenya to a Ugandan father and a Kenyan mother, the youngest of two daughters. As a young child her love of art led her to draw on the walls of the house in charcoal, which was not met with approval by her parents. Her father worked as a driver and was a strong believer in the benefits of education and encouraged his children in their studies. She attended St. Theresa Primary School in Eastleigh, Nairobi, where the Irish nuns recognised her artistic talent and encouraged her to study further. She excelled at geography and nature studies and trained as a teacher after completing her school education.

Age 21, Karuga attended the Margaret Trowell School of Industrial and Fine Arts, Makerere University in Kampala, Uganda where she studied design, painting and sculpture between 1950 and 1952. She was the first female graduate of the university. She specialised in sculpture whilst at university. One of her tutors was Gregory Maloba. Karuga worked in commercial art for a short period before returning to Kenya.

== Career ==
Karuga moved back to Kenya and worked as an art teacher. In 1965, she was part of an artists’ workshop organised by Elimo Njau and his Kibo Art Gallery in Marangu, Tanzania, but was not able to pursue her art in a significant way during her teaching career. One of her students went on to be a leading Kenyan British ceramicist, Magdalene Odundo.

She retired from teaching in the 1980s to pursue arts professionally, encouraged by one of her daughters who had visited from her home in London. She created collage arts using the paper packaging from Rexona soap, European language newspapers, glossy magazines and Unga flour. She started using these materials due to the unaffordability of more formal art materials that she had been trained to use at university. She discovered the potential of the recycled paper materials, and from it created captivating Byzantine-inspired collages. When brushes were scarce or too expensive, she made her own using feathers. Karuga took her inspiration from rural life, and her works depict pastoral and domestic scenes.

In 1987, she became an Artist in Residence at the Paa ya Paa Arts Centre in Nairobi.

In 1988 Karuga was commissioned to illustrate a theatrical adaptation of Amos Tutuola’s magical book, The Palm Wine Drinkard by French directors Gilles Zaepffel and Paule Kingleur. The shows took place in the Théâtre Écarlate in Limoges in 1988 and in Épinal in 1989. This drew considerable attention and interest to her work.

During the 1990s, her collage ‘illustrations’ were exhibited in Paris, at the Commonwealth Institute in London and in the Studio Museum in Harlem, USA. Karuga visited Paris for her exhibition and was impressed by the respect afforded to artists there.

Karuga was the only woman in Studio Museum Harlem’s exhibition Contemporary African Artists: Changing Tradition (1990), and received a lifetime achievement award from the African Voice newspaper. Her work lives on in several collections, including the Red Hill Gallery, National Museums of Kenya, Murumbi Trust, and the Watatu Foundation.

== Personal life ==
Karuga married in 1953, having three children with her husband, and a number of grandchildren and great grandchildren. She lived in a small house in Nairobi. As well as teaching she was a subsistence farmer. Her husband only started to appreciate her art when it started to sell.

In 2006 Karuga moved to Ireland to live with family and to receive medical attention due to her failing health. She died on 9 February 2021 at the age of ninety-three at the Amberley Nursing Home in Fermoy, Ireland where she lived with her daughter.
