= Enterprise Distributed Object Computing =

The UML profile for Enterprise Distributed Object Computing (EDOC) is a standard of the Object Management Group in support of open distributed computing using model-driven architecture and service-oriented architecture. Its aim is to simplify the development of component based (EDOC) systems by providing a UML-based modeling framework conforming to the MDA of the OMG.

The basis of EDOC is the Enterprise Collaboration Architecture, ECA, meta model that defines how roles interact within communities in the performance of collaborative business processes.

== The seven EDOC specifications ==
EDOC is composed of seven specifications:

1. The Enterprise Collaboration Architecture, ECA
2. The Metamodel and UML Profile for Java and EJB
3. The Flow Composition Model, FCM
4. The UML Profile for Patterns
5. The UML Profile for ECA
6. The UML Profile for Meta Object Facility
7. The UML Profile for Relationships

== See also ==
- Model Driven Engineering (MDE)
- Model-driven architecture (MDA)
- Meta-model
- Meta-modeling
- Meta-Object Facility (MOF)
- Unified Modeling Language (UML)
