= The Jezebel Spirit =

1981 single by David Byrne and Brian Eno

Single by David Byrne and Brian Eno

from the album My Life in the Bush of Ghosts
- B-side: "Regiment" "Very, Very Hungry"
- Released: May 29, 1981
- Length: 3:34
- Label: E.G.; Polydor
- Songwriters: Byrne; Eno

"The Jezebel Spirit" is the fifth song from the first collaborative studio album My Life in the Bush of Ghosts by David Byrne and Brian Eno (1981). It was released as a single the same year.

== Content ==
The song includes a "found sound"—an exorcism performed by an anonymous exorcist—over Afrobeat music similar to that Byrne and Eno had used in the Talking Heads album Remain in Light. The exorcism was to have been a recording of Kathryn Kuhlman, but her estate prohibited the use of her voice. The phrase Jezebel spirit is referencing the woman Jezebel in the Book of Kings in the Hebrew Bible. Based on stories in that chapter, Jezebel has become associated with prostitution.

== Critical reception ==
While the album was generally well received by critics, the song attracted negative criticism. Jon Pareles wrote in Rolling Stone magazine that Byrne and Eno had used the exorcism for their own purposes and "trivialized the event".
