= My Life in the Bush of Ghosts (novel) =

1954 novel by Amos Tutuola

- First edition (UK)
- Author: Amos Tutuola
- Language: English
- Genre: Fairy Tale, Fantasy
- Publisher: Faber and Faber (UK) Grove Press (US)
- Publication date: 1954
- Publication place: Nigeria
- Pages: 174
- Preceded by: The Palm-Wine Drinkard
- Followed by: Simbi and the Satyr of the Dark Jungle

My Life in the Bush of Ghosts is a novel by Nigerian writer Amos Tutuola, published in 1954. It tells the story of a young West African boy who becomes lost in the wilderness, known as the bush, after fleeing from slave traders with his elder brother. The novel is presented as a collection of related narratives, although not always in chronological order, which adds to its surreal and dreamlike quality.

The protagonist, who remains unnamed throughout the book, is portrayed as young and inexperienced, unaware of the dangers that lurk in the bush, including ghosts and spirits that pose great peril to mortals. As he navigates through this strange and mysterious place, he encounters a series of bizarre and often nightmarish beings and experiences. Tutuola's use of English, from the perspective of a naive and youthful narrator, creates a unique and authentic voice that adds to the novel's charm and intrigue.

Like Tutuola's earlier work, The Palm-Wine Drinkard, My Life in the Bush of Ghosts is heavily metaphorical and autobiographical. Tutuola draws on his own experiences and African folklore to craft a tale that explores themes of identity, culture, and the human condition. The novel's disjointed narrative structure and fantastical elements, reminiscent of Grimms' Fairy Tales, lend it a sense of otherworldliness and make it a captivating read that challenges traditional notions of storytelling.

== Critical reception ==
Time magazine selected My Life in the Bush of Ghosts as one of its "100 Best Fantasy Books of All Time".

The title was Nominee for narrative Strainers in 1984 by Premio Grinzane Cavour.

== Tributes ==
The title of the 1981 album My Life in the Bush of Ghosts by David Byrne and Brian Eno was taken from this novel.

== Scholarly articles ==
- Kalliney, Peter J. (September 2013). "Developing Fictions: Amos Tutuola at Faber and Faber". Commonwealth of Letters: British Literary Culture and the Emergence of Postcolonial Aesthetics. Oxford University Press. doi:10.1093/acprof:oso/9780199977970.003.0005. ISBN 9780199977970.
- Lynn, Thomas Jay (2016). "'Redemption Song': Slavery's Disruption in Amos Tutuola's My Life in the Bush of Ghosts". English Studies in Africa. 59 (2): 54–63. doi:10.1080/00138398.2016.1239418. S2CID 218499241.
- Mbembe, Achille; Mitsch, R. H. (2003). "Life, Sovereignty, and Terror in the Fiction of Amos Tutuola". Research in African Literatures. 34 (4): 1–26. doi:10.2979/RAL.2003.34.4.1. JSTOR 4618325. S2CID 145359045.
