= BS 7910 =

British Standard in metallurgy

BS 7910, guide to methods for assessing the acceptability of flaws in metallic structures, is a British Standard code of practice for the assessment of flaws (weld defects in particular) using fracture mechanics principles. The technique is also referred to as an engineering critical assessment (ECA) or damage tolerance, and is complementary to other methods of weld quality assurance.

The standard was first introduced in 1980 as a fracture and fatigue assessment procedure, when it was known as PD 6493. Its name was changed to BS 7910 following a revision in 1999. The standard has undergone numerous subsequent revisions, the most recent being in December 2019.

Flaws (such as fabrication cracks, fatigue cracks, creep cracks and corrosion damage) can arise during the manufacture and use of metallic components. For safety-critical items such as aircraft, pipelines and pressure vessels, the failure of a single component due to the presence of a flaw can threaten human life, as well as having severe economic and environmental consequences. Other flaws may be harmless, as they will not lead to failure during the lifetime of the component. Replacement or repair of such flaws is economically wasteful. A fitness-for-service procedure such as BS 7910 allows flaws to be evaluated consistently and objectively, using fracture mechanics principles.
