= Gemma Wenger =

Producer, program host, singer, and author

Pastor Gemma Wenger
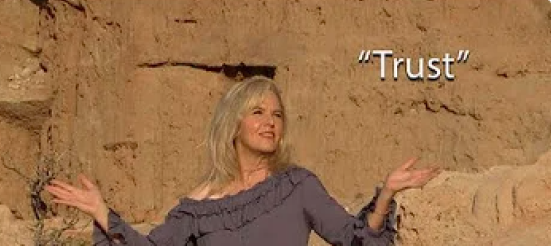
- Gemma Wenger singing "Trust" in music video filmed in the Mojave Desert.

Personal life
- Citizenship: United States
- Notable work: Interviews for her broadcast series "Beauty for Ashes".
- Education: B.A. in Education from UCLA
- Occupation: Christian Minister; Interview Show Host/Producer; Singer and Songwriter; Author

Religious life
- Religion: Christian

Gemma Wenger is a Christian pastor, interview show producer/host, singer/songwriter, and author. She is the producer/host for Gemma Wenger's Hollywood and Beauty for Ashes which were Official Selections in the 2021 International Christian Film & Music Festival. She is the songwriter for "Trust". as well having been a contributing author to multiple books.

== Interviews ==
For her shows, she has interviewed:

- The Pointer Sisters (Anita and Bonnie)
- Terry Moore
- Lydia Cornell of "Too Close for Comfort"
- Shirley Jones and her husband Marty Ingels
- As well as interviews with celebrities on the red carpet for various events in the entertainment industry, including "Night of 100 Stars".

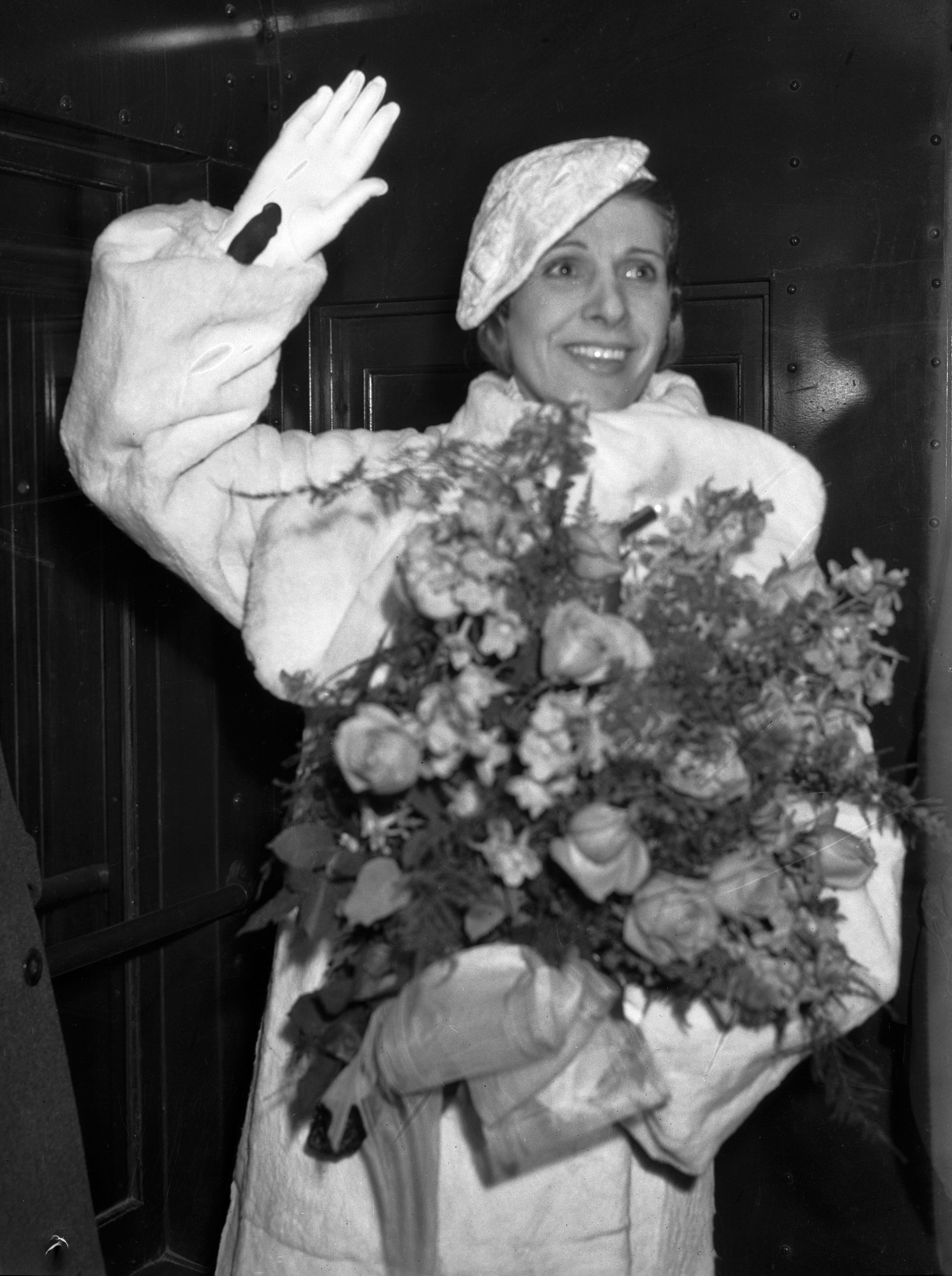
Aimee Semple McPherson (1934). Gemma Wenger was in the documentary Saving Sister Aimee (2001) about the legendary evangelist of the 1920s and 1930s.

== Film, television, and radio ==
Along with the production and hosting of her shows, Gemma Wenger is a religious minister and was interviewed in the documentary film about Aimee Semple McPherson, Saving Sister Aimee (Short Film, 2001). She has also appeared on TBN and The Cross TV. She has a radio program on KKLA Radio.Charisma Magazine reported she is working with director Richard Rossi on a film about Kathryn Kuhlman.

== Singer/songwriter ==
In 2019, Gemma Wenger was the singer/songwriter for "Trust" as well was also the creator of the sound recording

== Contributing author ==
She was the contributing author for:

- Redeeming the Screens: Living Stories of Media Ministers Bringing the Message of Jesus Christ to the Entertainment Industry
- Berkeley Street Theatre
- She wrote one chapter in Jesus Among the Homeless
- Empowering English Language Learners
- She was quoted in the book Creative Ways to Build a Community

== U.S. copyrights ==
"Trust" (song): Music and soundtrack copyrighted in 2019.

== Gallery of celebrities interviewed ==
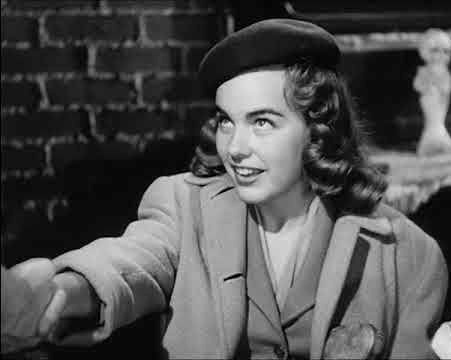
Terry Moore in image from The Great Rupert (1950)

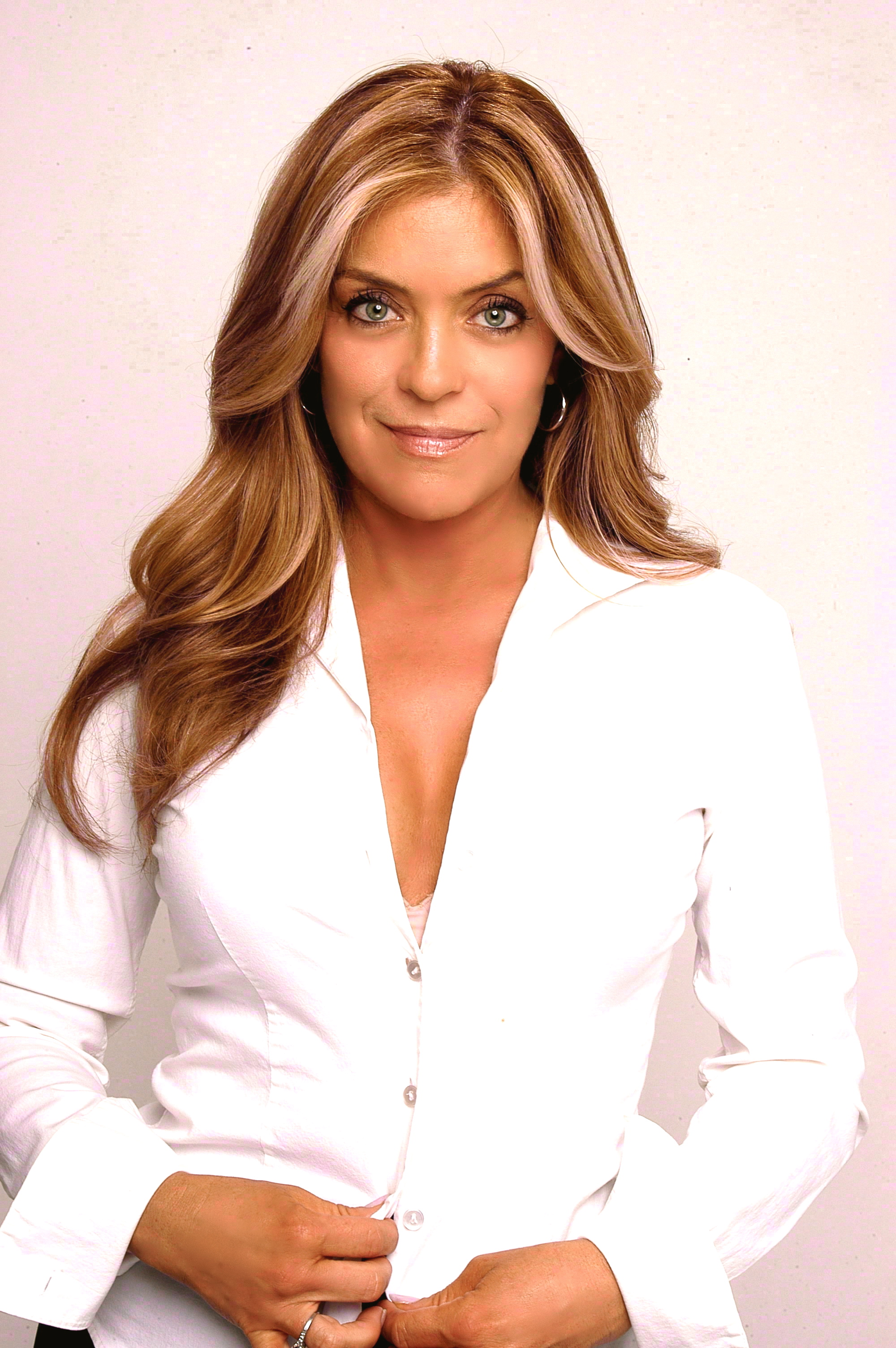
Lydia Cornell (2007)

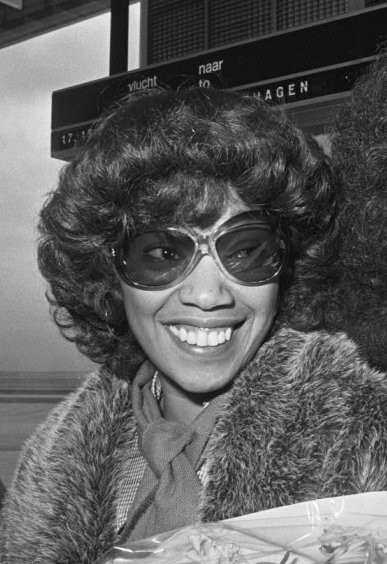
Anita Pointer in image from 1974

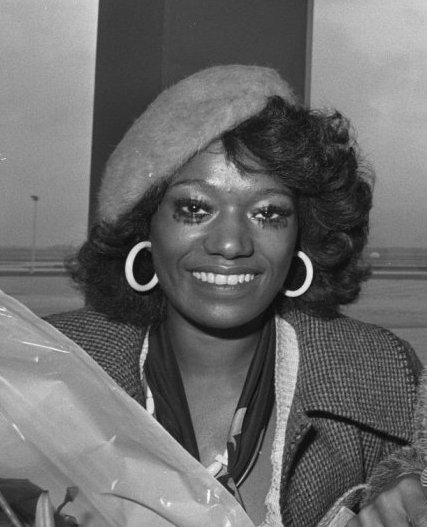
Bonnie Pointer in image from 1974

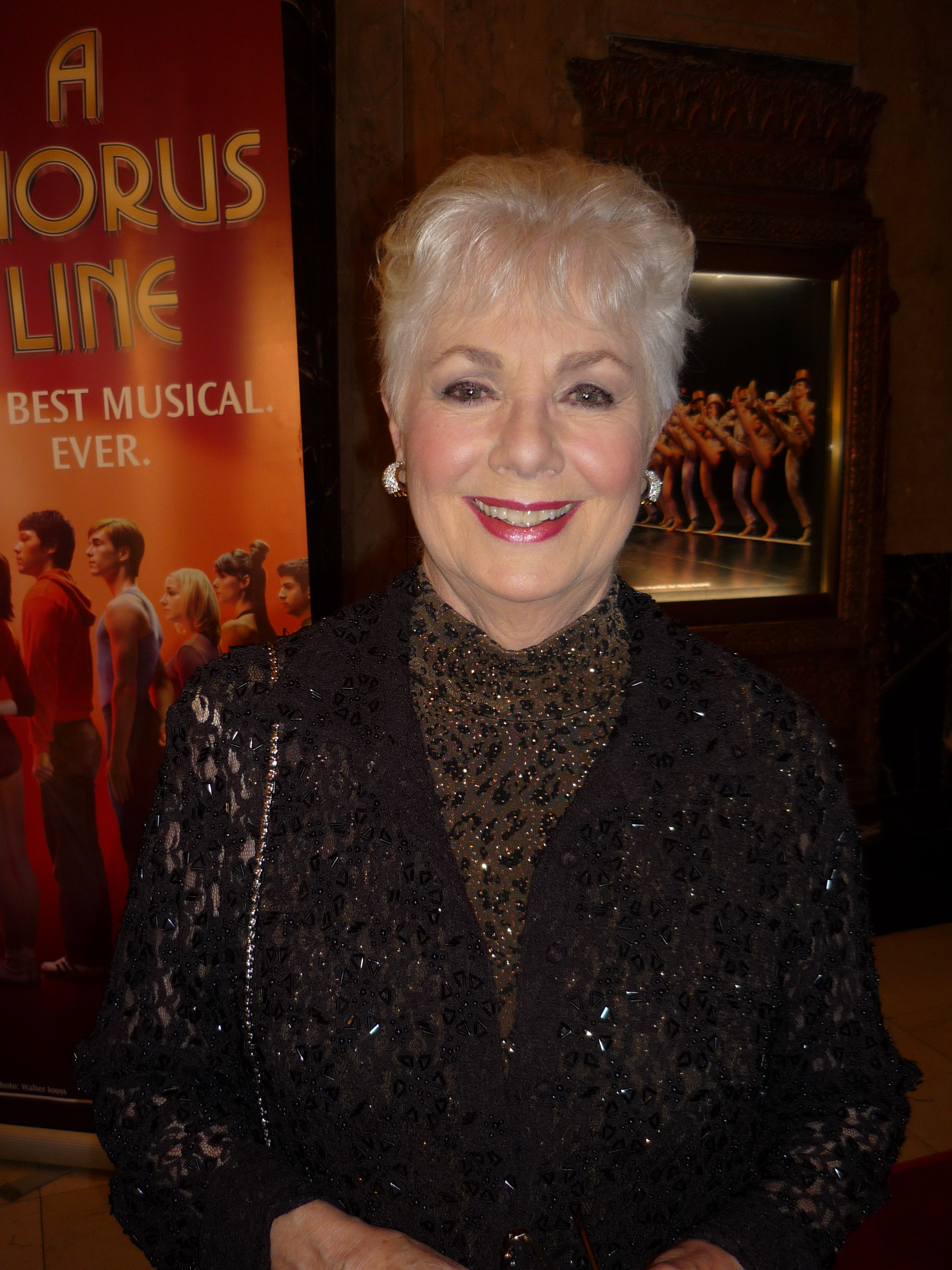
Shirley Jones (2010)

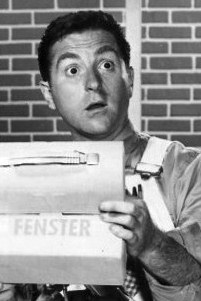
Marty Ingels in image from 1962
