= My Life in the Bush of Ghosts (album) =

1981 album by Brian Eno and David Byrne

Studio album by Brian Eno and David Byrne
- Released: February 25, 1981
- Recorded: 1979–1980
- Studios: R.P.M., New York City; Blue Rock, New York City; Eldorado Recording, Burbank, California; Different Fur, San Francisco, California; Sigma Sound, New York City
- Genres: Avant-funk; worldbeat; sampledelia; funk rock; experimental rock; Afro rock
- Length: 39:40
- Languages: English, Arabic
- Labels: Sire; E.G.
- Producers: Brian Eno; David Byrne

Brian Eno and David Byrne chronology
My Life in the Bush of Ghosts (1981)	Everything That Happens Will Happen Today (2008)

David Byrne chronology
My Life in the Bush of Ghosts (1981)	The Catherine Wheel (1981)

Brian Eno chronology
Ambient 3: Day of Radiance (1980)	My Life in the Bush of Ghosts (1981)	Ambient 4: On Land (1982)

2006 reissue cover

Singles from My Life in the Bush of Ghosts
- 1. "The Jezebel Spirit" Released: 29 May 1981

My Life in the Bush of Ghosts is the first collaborative studio album by Brian Eno and David Byrne, released on February 25, 1981. It was Byrne's first album without his band Talking Heads. The album integrates sampled vocals and found sounds, African and Middle Eastern rhythms, and electronic music techniques. It was recorded before Eno and Byrne's work on Talking Heads' fourth studio album Remain in Light (1980), but problems clearing samples delayed its release by several months.

The album title is derived from Nigerian writer Amos Tutuola's novel My Life in the Bush of Ghosts (1954). According to Byrne's 2006 liner notes, neither he nor Eno had read the novel, but they felt the title "seemed to encapsulate what this record was about".

The extensive sampling on the album is considered innovative, though its influence on later sample-based music genres is debated. Pitchfork named it the 21st-best album of the 1980s, while Slant Magazine named it the 83rd.

== Recording ==
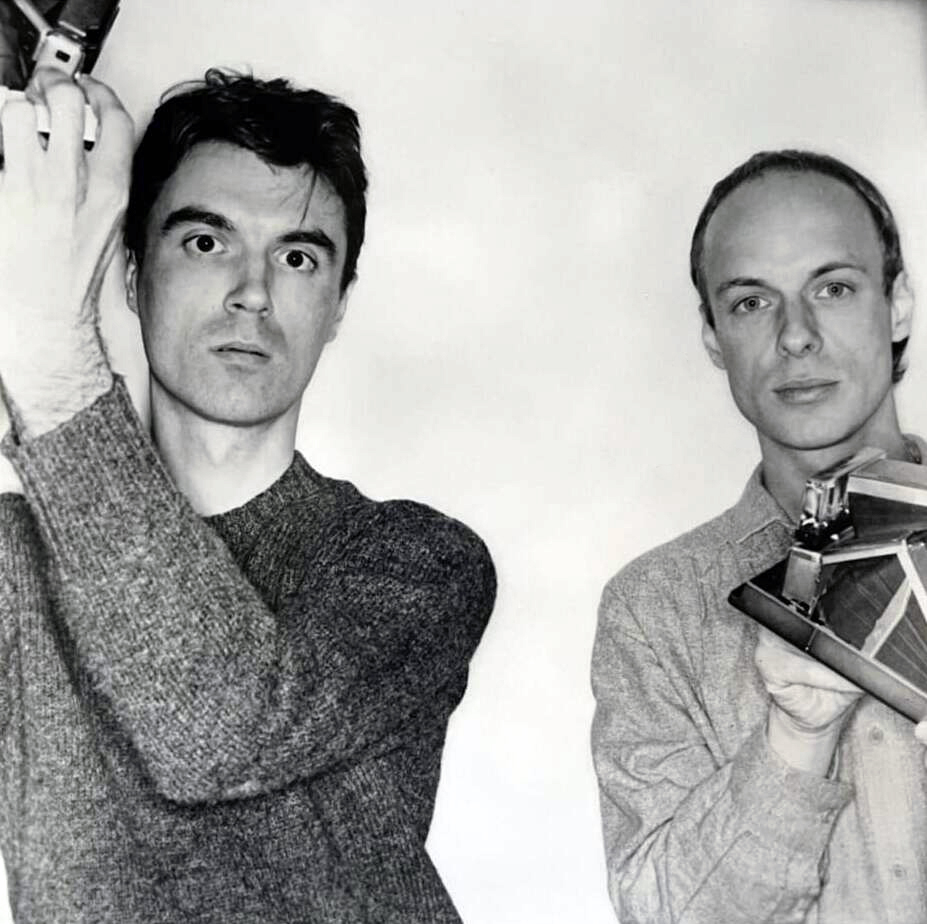
Promotional photo of David Byrne and Brian Eno. Eno (right) devised the album's sample-centric approach.

Eno moved from London to New York City in 1978. He was shocked by American radio, with "these completely cranky, right-wing Klan members hosting their own radio shows. I was amazed at how I could sit in my apartment and just listen to all these ghosts in the air, all this madness that was America." He began recording parts with no intention of using them on a record. He said "I had this idea of music being a net which traps things that happen to be passing through at the time".

Eno and Byrne first worked together on More Songs About Buildings and Food, the 1978 album by Byrne's band Talking Heads. My Life in the Bush of Ghosts was primarily recorded during a break between the Talking Heads albums Fear of Music (1979) and Remain in Light (1980), both produced by Eno. Eno had also recently recorded Fourth World, Vol. 1: Possible Musics with Jon Hassell, who intended to collaborate with Eno and Byrne on the album, but could not afford to fly to California for the recording sessions. Upon hearing the tapes, Hassell felt "outraged" at what he felt was an appropriation of his music.

Eno described My Life as a "vision of a psychedelic Africa". Rather than conventional pop or rock singing, most of the vocals are sampled from other sources, such as commercial recordings of Arabic singers, radio disc jockeys, and an exorcist. Musicians had previously used similar sampling techniques, but, according to Guardian writer Dave Simpson, sampling had never before been used "to such cataclysmic effect". The release was delayed while legal rights were sought for the large number of samples used on the album. A sample of evangelist Kathryn Kuhlman performing an exorcism intended for "The Jezebel Spirit" was refused by her estate as they objected to the context it was to be used in.

In 2001, Eno cited Holger Czukay's experiments with dictaphones and shortwave radios as earlier examples of sampling. He felt that the "difference was, I suppose, that I decided to make [sampling] the lead vocal". According to the Talking Heads bassist, Tina Weymouth, Czukay showed her and Eno an unfinished record composed of tape loops taken from media sources in 1979. Weymouth said, "I think Holger was a little bit upset about [My Life in the Bush of Ghosts] ... It was a good idea, but it was somebody else's idea first, and [Eno] should've left Holger do it first because it was his idea at first, although maybe some other people had done it before, but it was the first time in the rock context."

== Release ==
Soon after My Life in the Bush of Ghosts was released, the Islamic Council of Great Britain objected to the use of samples of Qur'anic recital in the track "Qu'ran", considering it blasphemy. Byrne and Eno removed the track from later pressings. In 2006, Byrne said:

We thought, "Okay, in deference to somebody's religion, we'll take it off." You could probably argue for and against monkeying with something like that. But I think we were certainly feeling very cautious about this whole thing. We made a big effort to try and clear all the voices, and make sure everybody was okay with everything ... So I think in that sense we reacted maybe with more caution than we had to.

"Regiment" and "The Carrier" sample the voice of Lebanese singer Dunya Younes (credited in the album's liner notes as Dunya Yusin). Although Byrne and Eno took care to clear the samples with the label that released the album from which her vocals had been sampled, as well as paid for the sampling accordingly, Younes was unaware of the use of her voice on the album until 2017. Both songs were taken down from streaming services after a family representative contacted the duo a year later, and the songs were later reinstated when the issue was settled amicably out of court; Younes ultimately expressed flattery with her recording's inclusion, crediting it with helping expose Lebanese culture to a wider audience.

Music videos for "America Is Waiting" and "Mea Culpa" were created by the collage filmmaker Bruce Conner.

=== Samples ===
The following notes are adapted from the album's liner notes and indicate the voices sampled.

Side one

1. "America Is Waiting" – Ray Taliaferro of KGO Newstalk AM 810 (unidentified in the liner notes); San Francisco, April 1980.
2. "Mea Culpa" – inflamed caller and smooth politician replying, both unidentified; radio call-in show, New York, July 1979.
3. "Regiment" – Dunya Younes, Lebanese mountain singer; from "Abu Zeluf" on Music in the World of Islam, Volume One: The Human Voice (Tangent TGS 131).
4. "Help Me Somebody" – Reverend Paul Morton; broadcast sermon, New Orleans, June 1980.
5. "The Jezebel Spirit" – unidentified exorcist; New York, September 1980.

Side two

6. "Qu'ran" – Algerian Muslims chanting the Qur'an; from "Recitation of Verses of the Qu'ran" on Music in the World of Islam, Volume One: The Human Voice (Tangent TGS 131).
7. "Moonlight in Glory" – The Moving Star Hall Singers (from Johns Island, South Carolina); from Sea Island Folk Festival (Folkways FS 3841), produced by Guy Carawan.
8. "The Carrier" – Dunya Younes (same source as track 3)
9. "A Secret Life" – Samira Tewfik, Lebanese popular singer; from Les Plus Grands Artistes du Monde Arabe (EMI).
10. "Come with Us" – unidentified radio evangelist; San Francisco, April 1980.

== Packaging ==
The original package design was created by Peter Saville. The cover image was created by pasting small cutout humanoid shapes onto a monitor and pointing a camera at it to create video feedback, infinitely multiplying the shapes. Byrne said of the process: "Somehow, despite it being very techie, these techniques also seemed analogous to what we were doing on the record. It was funky as well as being techie. Extremely lo-tech, actually, and not what you were supposed to do with a TV set."

== Critical reception and legacy ==
Retrospective professional ratings
Review scores
Source	Rating
AllMusic	5/5 stars
Entertainment Weekly	A−
The Guardian	5/5 stars
The Independent	5/5 stars
Mojo	5/5 stars
The Observer	4/5 stars
Pitchfork	8.5/10
Q	4/5 stars
The Rolling Stone Album Guide	3.5/5 stars
Uncut	5/5 stars

Though it came to be seen as groundbreaking, My Life in the Bush of Ghost initially received weak reviews, disappointing Eno and leading him further from song-based music. According to the journalist Simon Reynolds, many initial reviews dismissed it as "an eggheads-in-the-soundlab experimental exercise." In Rolling Stone, Jon Pareles praised it as "an undeniably awesome feat of tape editing and rhythmic ingenuity" that generally avoids "exoticism or cuteness" by "complementing the [speech] sources without absorbing them". Village Voice critic Robert Christgau gave it "C+" and found it "as cluttered and undistinguished as the MOR fusion and prog-rock it brings to the mind's ear" while lacking "the songful sweep of Remain in Light or the austere weirdness of Jon Hassell".

My Life was influential in its use and treatment of sampled source material. AllMusic critic John Bush describes it as a "pioneering work for countless styles connected to electronics, ambience and Third World music". The Independent's Andy Gill found it groundbreaking in its recontextualisation of sampling in a less overtly avant-garde context, with its sampled sounds instead being "marshalled by funk rhythms into repetitive hooks". In The Observer, Jason Cowley wrote that its immediate influence was felt "in the work of young artists of ambition, from David Sylvian to Kate Bush", and later in the work of electronic artists such as Massive Attack, Moby, and Thievery Corporation. Andy Fyfe of Mojo characterized it in 2006 as a "disturbingly funky exotic stew" that "was mind-bending in its day and remains so now ... It isn't really overstating the case to say that without this album western music would not sound like it does today." Chris Dahlen of Pitchfork felt that while its sampled vocals had lost some of their revolutionary impact, the album mostly lives up to its reputation "as a near-masterpiece, a milestone of sampled music, and a peace summit in the continual West-meets-rest struggle".

Responding to accusations of cultural appropriation, Eno said: "We weren't trying to do African music. We were trying to use some of the things we thought we'd learn from that in making a newer version of our own music." In another interview, he said: "I'd say that anything I'm doing is simply my misunderstanding of black music."

In a 1985 interview, Kate Bush said that My Life had "left a very big mark on popular music". The Pink Floyd keyboardist, Richard Wright, said it "knocked me sideways when I first heard it – full of drum loops, samples and soundscapes. Stuff that we really take for granted now, but which was unheard of in all but the most progressive musical circles at the time... The way the sounds were mixed in was so fresh, it was amazing." Hank Shocklee of hip hop production collective the Bomb Squad cited the album as an influence on their sample-driven production work for Public Enemy. Pitchfork named it the 21st-best album of the 1980s, while Slant Magazine named it the 83rd.

== Reissue ==
My Life in the Bush of Ghosts was reissued on 27 March 2006 in the United Kingdom and on 11 April 2006 in the United States, remastered and with seven extra tracks. The multitracks for "Help Me Somebody" and "A Secret Life" were made available to download. Under the Creative Commons license, members of the public are able to download the multitracks and use them for their own remixes.

== Track listing ==
All music is composed by Brian Eno and David Byrne, except "Regiment" by Eno, Byrne, and Michael "Busta Cherry" Jones.

Side A
No.	Title	Length
1.	"America Is Waiting"	3:36
2.	"Mea Culpa"	3:35
3.	"Regiment"	3:56
4.	"Help Me Somebody"	4:18
5.	"The Jezebel Spirit"	4:55

Side B
No.	Title	Length
1.	"Qu'ran"	3:46
2.	"Moonlight in Glory"	4:19
3.	"The Carrier"	3:30
4.	"A Secret Life"	2:20
5.	"Come with Us"	2:38
6.	"Mountain of Needles"	2:35

For the 1981 second edition, the track "Qu'ran" was removed at the request of the Islamic Council of Great Britain. In its place "Very, Very Hungry" (length: 3:21), previously released as the B-side of "The Jezebel Spirit" 12" single, was substituted. The first edition of the CD (1986) included both tracks, with "Very, Very Hungry" being a bonus track. Later editions (1990 and later) followed the revised LP track order without "Qu'ran".

== Personnel ==
Credits are adapted from the liner notes for the album's 2006 reissue.

- David Byrne and Brian Eno – guitars, bass guitars, synthesizers, drums, percussion, found objects (Eno plays the synthesizer solo on "Regiment")
- John Cooksey – drums on "Help Me Somebody" and "Qu'ran"
- Chris Frantz – drums on "Regiment"
- Robert Fripp – Frippertronics on "Regiment"
- Michael "Busta Cherry" Jones – bass guitar on "Regiment"
- Dennis Keeley – bodhrán on "Mea Culpa"
- Bill Laswell – bass guitar on "America Is Waiting"
- Mingo Lewis – batá, sticks on "The Jezebel Spirit" and "The Carrier"
- Prairie Prince – can, bass drum on "The Jezebel Spirit" and "The Carrier"
- José Rossy – congas, agong-gong on "Moonlight in Glory"
- Steve Scales – congas, metals on "Help Me Somebody"
- David Van Tieghem – drums, percussion (scrap metal, found objects) on "America Is Waiting" and "Regiment"
- Tim Wright – click bass on "America Is Waiting"
- Rooks on "Help Me Somebody" courtesy of April Potts, recorded at Eglingham Hall

== Charts ==
Chart (1981)	Peak position
Australian Albums (Kent Music Report)	47
New Zealand Albums (RMNZ)	8
UK Albums (Official Charts)	29
US Billboard 200	44

Chart (2006–2012)	Peak position
Belgian Albums (Ultratop Flanders)	62
Italian Albums (FIMI)	29

== Certifications ==
Region	Certification	Certified units/sales
United Kingdom (BPI) 2006 release	Silver	60,000^{‡}
^{‡} Sales+streaming figures based on certification alone.

== Release history ==
Region	Date	Label	Format	Catalog
Worldwide	1981	Sire	LP	1-6093
Worldwide	1981	Sire	CD	2-6093
Worldwide	1981	E.G.	CD	48
Worldwide	1988	Sire	CD	2-6093
Worldwide	1988	Sire	Cassette tape	4-6093
Worldwide	1990	Sire	CD	2-45374
Worldwide	1991	Sire	LP	1-45374
Worldwide	1991	Sire	Cassette tape	4-45374
Worldwide	1999	EMI	CD	0777 7 86473 2 4
Worldwide	1999	Sire	CD	45374
Worldwide	2006	Nonesuch	CD	79894
