= Oscar Dathorne =

Guyanese educator, novelist, poet and critic (1934–2007)

- Born: Oscar Ronald Dathorne; 19 November 1934; Georgetown, Guyana
- Died: 18 December 2007 (aged 73)
- Other name: O. R. Dathorne
- Education: Queen's College
- Alma mater: University of Sheffield
- Occupations: Educator, novelist, poet and critic
- Known for: Founder of the Association of Caribbean Studies and the Journal of Caribbean Studies
- Spouse: Hilde Dathorne

Oscar Ronald Dathorne (19 November 1934 – 18 December 2007) was a Guyanese educator, novelist, poet and critic. He was the founder of the Association of Caribbean Studies and the Journal of Caribbean Studies.

== Biography ==
Born in Georgetown, Guyana, Dathorne attended Queen's College, prior to his parents moving the family to England in 1953. He attended the University of Sheffield in 1955, obtaining his BA English degree in 1958 and subsequently completing his MA in 1960 and his PhD, English, in 1966.

However, having completed his studies, Dathorne found that few English universities were willing to offer him anything other than junior positions. He therefore sought job opportunities abroad and successfully applied for a teaching post at the University of Ibadan in Nigeria. He remained in West Africa for six years, completing his stay while holding a full professorship at the University of Sierra Leone as head of the English department. With his use of African literature as a basis for many English classes and the increased recognition that African literature be defined as written by Africans rather than about Africans, in 1969 he was invited to the United States as a guest lecturer at Yale University.

With the continuing changes in the black American psyche, African culture and heritage were viewed as a past in which to take great pride. As a result, universities throughout the US were becoming interested in forming African and African-American study departments. Having specialist knowledge within this area, Dathorne became professor of African studies at Howard University in Washington, D.C.

He taught African-American studies at the University of Wisconsin–Madison, and then spent 15 years working at Ohio State and the University of Miami, establishing and directing African, Caribbean, and African-American study programs. In 1987, he left the University of Miami to take up a post as a professor in the English department at the University of Kentucky until 2000.

In 1979, he became the founding editor of the Journal of Caribbean Studies.

Dathorne was the author of novels, poetry and non-fiction works, as well as having edited the anthologies Caribbean Narrative (London: Heinemann, 1966) and Caribbean Verse (Heinemann, 1967).

He died on 8 December 2007, survived by his wife Hilde.

== Selected writings ==
- The Black Mind: A History of African Literature, 1974
- African Literature in the Twentieth Century, 1976
- Dark Ancestor: The Literature of the Black Man in the Caribbean, 1981
- In Europe's Image: The Need for American Multiculturalism, 1994
- Imagining the World: Mythical Belief Versus Reality in Global Encounters, 1994
- Asian Voyages: Two Thousand Years of Constructing the Other, 1996
- Worlds Apart: Race in the Modern Periods, 2001

== Novels ==
- Dumplings in the Soup, 1963
- The Scholar-Man, 1964
- Dele's Child, 1986

== Poetry ==
- Songs for a New World, 1988
