= Joana de Eça =

Portuguese courtier (1480–1572)

Joana de Eça (1480–1572) was a Portuguese courtier and royal favorite. She served as camareira-mor (Mistress of the Robes) to Catherine of Austria, Queen of Portugal.

She was born to João Fogaça and D. Maria de Eça and married Pedro Gonçalves da Câmara. She served as principal lady-in-waiting to queen regent Catherine, and was reputed to have had influence over the affairs of state as a royal favorite during the minor regency of Sebastian of Portugal, which made her a controversial public figure.
