= The Palm-Wine Drinkard =

1952 novel by Nigerian writer Amos Tutuola

- First edition (UK)
- Author: Amos Tutuola
- Language: English
- Publisher: Faber and Faber (UK); Grove Press (US)
- Publication date: 1952 (UK); 1953 (US)
- Publication place: Nigeria
- Pages: 125
- ISBN: 0-571-04996-6
- Followed by: My Life in the Bush of Ghosts

The Palm-Wine Drinkard (subtitled "and His Dead Palm-Wine Tapster in the Dead's Town") is a novel published in 1952 by the Nigerian author Amos Tutuola. The first African novel published in English outside of Africa, this quest tale based on Yoruba folktales is written in a modified English or Pidgin English. In it, a man follows his brewer into the land of the dead, encountering many spirits and adventures. The novel has always been controversial, inspiring both admiration and contempt among Western and Nigerian critics, but has emerged as one of the most important texts in the African literary canon, translated into more than a dozen languages.

== Plot ==
The Palm-Wine Drinkard, told in the first person, is about a god and juju-man who refers to himself as the “Father of gods who could do anything in this world.” His life is centered around an overconsumption of palm wine, which is made from the fermented sap of the palm tree and used in ceremonies all over West Africa. As the son of a rich man, the narrator can afford his own tapster (a man who taps the palm tree for sap and then prepares the wine). When the tapster falls from a palm-tree and dies, cutting off his supply, the desperate narrator searches for another but finds that none can match the competence of the deceased tapster. He sets off on a journey to find out where his dead tapster went and uses his cunning to overcome many trials from supernatural entities along the way.

The narrator meets an old man who is actually a god seven months after departing from his hometown who promises to provide answers if he brings Death from his house with a magical net. The old man expects Death to kill the narrator but he returns with Death causing the old man to run away in fear without providing the promised whereabouts of the dead tapster.

Five months after leaving the town of the old man, the narrator arrives at another town and is received as a guest by the head of the town. After the narrator reveals his omnipotence, the town head offers to give him the whereabouts of the dead tapster if he saves his daughter from a creature–later revealed to be the Complete Gentleman–who had abducted her from the market. The narrator saves the lady and takes her as his wife but the town head does not tell him where the dead tapster is knowing that he would immediately depart if he knew. The narrator’s wife gives birth to his child, “Zurrjir,” who terrorizes the town and must be dealt with by the narrator. After this incident, the town head tells the narrator that the deceased tapster is living at the Dead’s town and the narrator, accompanied by his wife, departs for this location.

With a destination now in mind, the narrator and his wife travel through supernatural forests and towns meeting various entities along the way, some of whom are malicious and others who are hospitable. They help each other overcome various challenges along the way. Once they reach the Dead’s town, it is revealed that the tapster is unable to leave. However, the tapster gives the narrator an egg that could grant him anything he wished. The narrator journeys back home and uses the egg to provide infinite food and palm wine to his town and surrounding areas during a famine. However, the people accidentally smash the egg as they play around it in jubilation and quickly turn on the narrator, scorning him as they realize no more food can be produced. The story ends with the narrator gluing the egg back together, using it to enact vengeance upon these people, and then performing a ceremony to end the famine.

== Criticism ==
The Palm-Wine Drinkard was widely reviewed in Western publications when it was published by Faber and Faber. In 1975, the Africanist literary critic Bernth Lindfors produced an anthology of all the reviews of Tutuola's work published to date. The first review was an enthusiastic one from Dylan Thomas, who felt it was "simply and carefully described" in "young English"; his lyrical 500-word review drew attention to Tutuola's work and set the tone for succeeding criticism.

The early reviewers after Thomas described the book as "primitive", "primeval", "naïve", "un-willed", "lazy", and "barbaric" or "barbarous". The New York Times Book Review was typical in describing Tutuola as "a true primitive" whose world had "no connection at all with the European rational and Christian traditions," adding that Tutuola was "not a revolutionist of the word, …not a surrealist" but an author with an "un-willed style" whose text had "nothing to do with the author's intentions". The New Yorker took this criticism to its logical ends, stating that Tutuola was "being taken a great deal too seriously" as he is just a "natural storyteller" with a "lack of inhibition" and an "uncorrupted innocence" whose text was not new to anyone who had been raised on "old-fashioned nursery literature". The reviewer concluded that American authors should not imitate Tutuola, as "it would be fatal for a writer with a richer literary inheritance". In The Spectator, Kingsley Amis called the book an "unfathomable African myth" but credited it with a "unique grotesque humour" that is a "severe test" for the reader.

Given these Western reviews, it is not surprising that African intellectuals of the time saw the book as bad for Africa, believing that the story showed Nigerians as illiterate and superstitious drunks. They worried that the novel confirmed Europeans' racist "fantastic" concepts of Africa, "a continent of which they are profoundly ignorant". Some criticized the novel as unoriginal, labeling it as little more than a retelling of Yoruba tales heard in the village square and Tutuola as "merely" a story teller who embellished stories for a given audience. Some insisted that Tutuola's "strange lingo" was related to neither Yoruba nor West African Pidgin English.

It was only later that the novel began to rise in the general estimation. Critics began to value Tutuola's literary style as a unique exploration of the possibilities of African folklore instead of the more typical realist imitation of European novels in African novels. One of the contributions Tutuola made was to "kill forever any idea that Africans are copyists of the cultures of other races". Tutuola was seen as a "pioneer of a new literary form, based on an ancient verbal style". Rather than seeing the book as mere pastiche, critics began to note that Tutuola had done a great deal "to impose an extraordinary unity upon his apparently random collection of traditional material" and that what may have started as "fragments of folklore, ritual and belief" had "all passed through the transmuting fire of an individual imagination". The Nigerian critic E. N. Obiechina argued that the narrator's "cosmopolitanism" enables him "to move freely through the rigidly partitioned world of the traditional folk-tale". In contrast to the works of an author like Kafka, he added, in which human beings are the impotent victims of inexorable fate, the narrator of The Palm Wine Drinkard "is the proud possessor of great magical powers with which he defies even Fate itself". The lack of resolution in the novel was also seen as more authentic, meant to enable group discussion in the same way that African riddles, proverbs and folktales did. Tutuola was no more ungrammatical than James Joyce or Mark Twain, whose use of dialect was more violent, others argued. The Nigerian novelist Chinua Achebe also defended Tutuola's work, stating that it could be read as a moral commentary on Western consumerism.

Well aware of the criticism, Tutuola has stated that he had no regrets, "Probably if I had more education, that might change my writing or improve it or change it to another thing people would not admire. Well, I cannot say. Perhaps with higher education, I might not be as popular a writer. I might not write folktales. I might not take it as anything important. I would take it as superstition and not write in that line". He also added "I wrote The Palm-Wine Drinkard for the people of the other countries to read the Yoruba folklores. ... My purpose of writing is to make other people to understand more about Yoruba people and in fact they have already understood more than ever before".

== Legacy ==
The Palm-Wine Drinkard was included on the "Big Jubilee Read" list of 70 books selected by a panel of experts, and announced by the BBC and The Reading Agency in April 2022, to celebrate Queen Elizabeth II's platinum jubilee in June 2022. It was also included on Time's list of 100 Best Fantasy Books of All Times.

== Works cited ==
- Abiechina, E. N. (1968). "Amos Tutuola and the Oral Tradition". Présence Africaine. 65: 85–106. doi:10.3917/presa.065.0085.
- Lindfors, Bernth (1975). Critical Perspectives on Amos Tutuola. Washington, DC: Three Continents Press. ISBN 9780914478058. OCLC 1583879.
- Lindfors, Bernth (1999). The Blind Men and the Elephant and Other Essays in Biographical Criticism. Africa World Press. ISBN 9780865437289.
- Lo Liyong, Taban (1968). "Tutuola, Son of Zinjanthropus". Busara.
- Palmer, Eustace (1978). "Twenty-five years of Amos Tutuola". The International Fiction Review. 5 (1).
- Rodman, Selden (20 September 1953). "Book Review of Palm-Wine Drinkard". The New York Times Book Review.
- Staff Writer (1 May 1954). "Portrait: A Life in the Bush of Ghosts". West Africa.
- Thomas, Dylan (6 July 1952). "Blithe Spirits". The Observer.
- West, Anthony (5 December 1953). "Book Review of Palm-Wine Drinkard". The New Yorker.
