= Emmanuel Christian Academy (Ohio) =

Location
- 2177 Emmanuel Way; Springfield, (Clark County), Ohio 45502; United States
- Coordinates: 39°58′12″N 83°45′44″W

Information
- Type: Private, Coeducational High School
- Religious affiliation: Christian
- Opened: 1997
- Superintendent: John Essig
- Principal: Dan Moore
- Teaching staff: 27.1 (on an FTE basis)
- Grades: K-12
- Enrollment: 286 (2019–20)
- Average class size: 15
- Student to teacher ratio: 10.6
- Colors: Purple and Gold
- Athletics conference: Metro Buckeye Conference
- Sports: Basketball
- Mascot: Lions
- Team name: Lions
- Accreditation: North Central Association of Colleges and Schools
- Website: http://www.ecaoh.com

Emmanuel Christian Academy (ECA) is a private Christian school located in Springfield, Ohio that has a total enrollment of 260-300 students in pre-kindergarten through 12th grade. Most of the students are from Champaign County, Ohio and Clark County, Ohio.

Emmanuel teaches conservative Bible education classes at all grade levels and holds weekly chapel services for students.

The school's motto is "Preparing Leaders to Impact the World".
