= Enterobacterial common antigen =

The enterobacterial common antigen (ECA) is a carbohydrate antigen found in the outer membrane of many Enterobacterales species. The antigen is unanimously absent from other gram-negative and gram-positive bacteria. Aeromonas hydrophila 209A is the only organism outside of Enterobacterales that expresses the ECA. More studies are needed to explain the presence of the antigen in this species as no other strains of this species express the antigen. The ECA is a polysaccharide made of repeating units of trisaccharides. The functions of these units have very few proven functions. Some evidence indicates role in pathogenicity in the bacteria that present the ECA. There are three separate types of ECA these include ECA_{PG}, ECA_{LPS}, and ECA_{CYC,} each have different lengths. The synthesis of the ECA is controlled by the wec operon and has a 12-step synthesis which is described below. Due to the lack of proven function of the ECA, any clinical significance is hard to define however, some evidence suggests that human serum has antibodies against ECA.

== History ==
The ECA was first described in 1962 in a paper written by Calvin M. Kunin and colleagues. When documenting strains of E. coli responsible for urinary tract infections, Kunin exposed these E. coli strains to rabbit antisera and various other E. coli strains (102 homologous and heterologous strains). Using passive agglutination, Kunin detected the O-antigen found in the lipopolysaccharide (LPS) of E. coli. During the experiments, Kunin noticed that there was cross-reactivity between the rabbit antisera and many of the E. coli strains. One of the sera, O14, reacted to an antigen found in a large range of E. coli strains. Notably, the antigen was not attached to the O-antigen of the LPS. The team noted that this antigen was observed in several other enteric (gram negative) bacteria strains and absent in many gram-positive strains. Kunin wanted to name the antigen the Common Antigen (CA) but his team convinced him to reconsider as to avoid confusion with the abbreviation for cancer. Thus, with a more specific name, the antigen was named the Enterobacterial Common Antigen (ECA). However, the ECA is not necessarily expressed in all enteric species. Many endosymbionts from Enterobacterales have lost the genes necessary for ECA synthesis. Additionally, Aeromonas hydrophila 209A is the only organism outside of Enterobacterales that expresses the ECA. Yet, more studies are needed to explain the presence of the antigen in this species as no other strains of this species express the antigen. Research on the ECA continues to develop.

== Gene ==
The genes the regulate and control the synthesis of the ECA are located within on operon called the wec operon. The operon starts at 85.4 centisomes on the Escherichia coli K-12 chromosome. In regards to ECA, the wec operon has multiple genes that play important parts in inhibition as well as assembly of the ECA; these include but are not limited to wecB, wecC, wecD, wecE, wecA, and wecG.

== Structure ==
The polysaccharide of the enterobacterial common antigen (ECA) is composed of repeating units of a trisaccharide. This trisaccharide is made of N-acetylglucosamine (GlcNAc), N-Acetyl-D-Mannosaminuronic Acid (ManNAcA), and 4-acetamido-4,6-dideoxy-D-galactose (Fuc4NAc). GlcNAc is connected to ManNAcA via an alpha 1,4 linkage. ManNAcA is connected to Fuc4NAc via a beta 1,4 linkage. Each full trisaccharide unit is connected to each other by an alpha 1,3 linkage from Fuc4NAc to GlcNAc.

There are three types of fully formed ECA: ECA_{PG}, ECA_{LPS}, and ECA_{CYC}. Regardless of the length, the polysaccharide is attached to a diacylglycerol with a phosphodiester bond and sits on the outer membrane of the bacterium. Like the ECA_{PG}, the ECA_{LPS} sits on the outer membrane of the bacterium and is attached to a lipid. The ECA_{LPS} is not only attached to a lipid but also an LPS core. The final type of ECA is ECA_{CYC}, which is different from the other two types in that it is found only in the cytoplasm, and is composed of the polysaccharide bound in a ring. Another distinguishing characteristic of ECA_{CYC} is the total length of the trisaccharide chain; ECA_{CYC} is usually 4 to 6 units long, while ECA_{LPS} and ECA_{PG} range from 1 to 14 units long.

== Synthesis ==
The three types of ECA have different qualities, but altogether share some basic features, the most important is the synthesis of the ECA unit. The synthesis of a unit of ECA is carried out by multiple enzymes. Each monosaccharide that makes up a unit is carried by an undecaprenyl phosphate (UDP) to a lipid carrier made of approximately 55 isoprenoid units in the inner membrane. Each monosaccharide is added to the lipid carrier to make a trisaccharide attached to a lipid. The enzymes that catalyze the group transfers of the monosaccharides from undecaprenyl phosphate to the forming ECA trisaccharide unit are Wec enzymes. The details of the synthesis are as follows:

Step 1: WecA takes GlcNAc from UDP-GlcNAc and attaches GlcNAc-1-phosphate to an isoprenoid carrier. The product is called Lipid I_{ECA}.

Step 2: WecB takes UDP-GlcNAc and epimerizes it at carbon 2. This makes UDP-N-acetylmannosamine.

Step 3: WecC forms UDP-ManNAcA from the UDP-N-acetylmannosamine (from step 2) by reducing NAD+ to NADH.

Step 4: WecG takes the ManNAcA from UDP-ManNAcA (from step 3) and adds it to Lipid I_{ECA} (From step 1). The product of this group transfer is Lipid II_{ECA}. At this point, 2 of the 3 carbohydrates that make the repeating unit of ECA are connected. The next steps (steps 5–8) prepare the final monosaccharide to be transferred to Lipid II_{ECA} to make Lipid III_{ECA}, which has one full ECA trisaccharide unit.

Step 5: Glucose-1-phosphate, dTTP, and a H+ combine in a reaction catalyzed by RmIA_{ECA} to make dTDP-glucose.

Step 6: NAD+ acts as a cofactor for the enzyme RmIB_{ECA} to convert dTDP-glucose (from step 5) into dTDP-4-keto-6-deoxy-D-glucose. This happens through a series of redox reactions and a dehydration reaction.

Step 7: WecE adds an amino group from a glutamate residue to dTDP-4-keto-6-deoxy-D-glucose (from step 6) to make dTDP-4-amino-4,6-dideoxy-a-D-galactose (dTDP-Fuc4N)

Step 8: Acetyl-CoA acts as a cofactor for the enzyme WecD, which makes dTDP-Fuc4NAc acetylating dTDP-Fuc4N (from step 7).

Step 9: WecF takes Fuc4NAc from dTDP-Fuc4NAc (from step 8) and adds it to Lipid II (ECA), to make Lipid III_{ECA}. At this point, the complete trisaccharide unit is on the cytoplasmic side of the inner membrane attached to a lipid carrier (Lipid III_{ECA}). The final synthesis step, polymerization, occurs on the periplasmic side of the inner membrane.

Step 10: WzxE, a flippase, flips Lipid III from the cytoplasmic side of the inner membrane to the periplasmic side of the inner membrane.

Step 11: WzyE polymerizes the ECA trisaccharides by taking the ECA unit from the lipid carrier and WzxE. The lipid carrier is returned to the cytoplasmic side of the membrane to create another ECA trisaccharide unit.

Step 12: The growing ECA chain is stopped at the correct length by WzzE through an unknown mechanism. The product of these 12 steps is a long chain of ECA units attached to an isoprenoid lipid carrier. From here, the ECA polysaccharide is specialized into the type of completed ECA it will be.

To make ECA_{PG}, the ECA polysaccharide is taken from the isoprenoid lipid carrier and given to a different, unknown lipid. The final product, ECA_{PG}, is an ECA polymer linked by a phosphodiester bond to a diacylglycerol.

To make ECA_{LPS}, WaaL, takes the ECA polysaccharide from the isoprenoid carrier and gives it to the core oligosaccharide of LPS. The synthesis of ECA in general shares many steps for the synthesis of LPS. The most significant overlap is the use of the WzxE and the WzzE proteins.

The mechanism by which ECA_{CYC} is made is largely unknown. It has been previously established that ECA_{CYC} is synthesized in the periplasm and that this mechanism involves WzzE. From there, ECA_{CYC} is transported back across the inner membrane to the cytoplasm by a mechanism that has not yet been determined.

== Function ==
Due to the close association of ECA biosynthesis and other processes like O-antigen and peptidoglycan synthesis, it is difficult to define specific functions of the ECA in different species. Enterobacterales species that have been cultured for prolonged periods show a significant reduction in O-chain synthesis while maintaining ECA stability. Several gene-knockout experiments show that upon altering genes participating in the synthesis of ECA, new sensitivities are observed. It is accepted that the ECA plays a role in pathogenicity.

== Clinical significance ==
The ECA occurs across all Enterobacterales species but very few species have antibodies to the antigen. This indicates that while all strains possess antigenic ECA, very few strains produce immunogenic ECA.

Many studies reported low concentrations of ECA antibodies present in human serum occurred before ECA knockout strains were available. The reported values are a combined titer of the ECA antibodies as well as the antibodies that are bound to protein antigens that are shared among Enterobacterales. ECA antibodies have been detected in human serum after infection by E. coli, Yersinia enterocolitica O3 strains, or Proteus mirabilis-associated arthritis patients.

Several studies have sought to identify how significant a role the ECA plays in pathogenicity, even under experimental conditions, the protection offered by an antibody response was slight and temporary in both active and passive immunization.
