= Evangelical Church Alliance =

The Evangelical Church Alliance International ("ECA") is an inter-denominational association of Christian ministers based in the United States.

Its official website asserts that it provides credentials to "pastors, teachers, para church leaders, missionaries, evangelists, speakers, youth workers, professors, military chaplains, and fire, industrial, hospice, police, and prison chaplains, to name a few".

The ECA is associated with the National Association of Evangelicals and the Evangelical Council for Financial Accountability.

== History ==
The ECA was established in 1887 by C.S. Hanley in Shenadoah, Iowa, as the World's Faith Missionary Association (WFMA). At his death in 1925 there were nearly 400 members throughout the United States.

As with similar organizations of such an age, the ECA has scant documentary history. However, a letter from C.S. Hanley's wife Minnie still exists, which provides some evidence of the initial vision of the organisation.

"My darling husband truly had a world vision of bringing Christian leadership into harmonious relation to each other. . . The World's Faith Missionary Association was organized and equipped for this purpose."

Soon after the death of C.S. Hanley, a decision was made by the board of WFMA to divest the organisation. However, the WFMA was re-established in two locations by separate groups within the organization. Each claimed the support of Mrs. Hanley.

Rev. C.S. Osterhus organized the WFMA in Robbinsdale, Minnesota, while another portion of membership under the leadership of Dr. Montgomery organized in Webster Groves, Missouri. In the case of the latter, the name "Fundamental Ministerial Association" was chosen in 1931 to reflect the organization's basis of unity and to distinguish the organization from the WFMA in Minnesota.

On July 21, 1958, during the annual convention at Trinity Seminary and Bible College in Chicago, Illinois, a more comprehensive constitution was created and the name was changed to The Evangelical Church Alliance.

The ECA's membership includes over 1,600+ constituents. One of the largest groupings of constituents in the ECA are military chaplains. Chaplains in the military represent more than 200 different denominations. The ECA is one of the most active (more than 100, both active and reserve) with 174 chaplains. Today the ECA's motto continues to be, "In things essential, unity; in things nonessential, liberty; and in all things, charity", and remains committed to the Word of God and to its members who minister throughout the world.

== Current leadership ==
Rev., Dr. Robert H. Turrill, President and CEO, Rev., Elmon R. Krupnik, Ph.D., Military Chaplain Commission Chairman

== See also ==
- Evangelicalism
- Parachurch organization
- Interdenominational
