= Who is William Onyeabor? =

Compilation album by William Onyeabor
- Released: October 29, 2013
- Length: 72:59
- Label: Luaka Bop
- Producer: Yale Evelev (executive producer)
- Compiler: Uchenna Ikonne

Who is William Onyeabor? is a 2013 compilation album by William Onyeabor released by Luaka Bop. The music was compiled by Uchenna Ikonne and was the first official re-issue of his music. Metacritic described the album as receiving "Universal acclaim" with Pitchfork citing it as one of the "best reissues" and NPR listing it as one of the best albums of 2013.

== Background ==
The music label Luaka Bop had previously released the album World Psychedelic Classics 3: Love's a Real Thing – The Funky Fuzzy Sounds of West Africa in 2005 while Strut Records released Nigeria 70 in the early 2000s, albums which Pitchfork described as helping "spur a revival in African music from the continent’s “Golden Age,”". Following the release of their first albums, Luaka Bop attempted to find musician William Onyeabor whose song "Better Change Your Mind" appeared on both Nigeria 70 and Love's a Real Thing.

Information ranged about Onyeabor with the only confirmed information being that he had self-released eight albums between 1977 and 1985 before disavowing music for Christianity. Nigerian blogger Uchenna Ikonne contacted the musician in 2009, describing it as the "toughest ordeal I had ever endured in my life" and got him signed to a contract with Luaka Bop.

== Release ==
Who Is William Onyeabor? was released by Luaka Bop on October 29, 2013. Who Is William Onyeabor? is the first legitimate reissue of his music. Onyeabor's music has been bootlegged while original copies can go for upwards of $500 online.

== Reception ==
Professional ratings
Review scores
Source	Rating
AllMusic	4.5/5 stars
Fact	4/5
Pitchfork	8.6/10
Rolling Stone	3.5/5 stars

On Metacritic, Who Is William Onyeabor? received an average score of 82 based on eight reviews.

The album received several nominations at the 2014 A2IM Libera Awards, a not-for-profit trade organization representing the independent music business. The nominations included "Independent Album of the Year", "Video of the Year", "Breakthrough Artist of the Year" and the Light Bulb Award.

== Track listing ==
No.	Title	Original album	Length
1.	"Body and Soul"	Body and Soul	10:08
2.	"Atomic Bomb"	Atomic Bomb	7:51
3.	"Good Name"	Good Name	10:08
4.	"Something You'll Never Forget"	Crashes in Love (1977 Version)	10:07
5.	"Why Go to War"	Tomorrow	9:06
6.	"Love Is Blind"	Great Lover	7:57
7.	"Heaven and Hell"	Crashes in Love (1977 Version)	4:03
8.	"Let's Fall in Love"	Good Name	7:23
9.	"Fantastic Man"	Tomorrow	6:27

Deluxe edition bonus tracks
No.	Title	Original album	Length
10.	"The Way to Win Your Love"	Body And Soul	7:24
11.	"Love Me Now"	Tomorrow	7:12
12.	"Jungle Gods"	Crashes in Love (1977 Version)	4:03
13.	"When the Going Is Smooth & Good"	Anything You Sow	12:53
