= Kompleksi =

Finnish musical group

Kompleksi ("complex" in Finnish) is an electro act from Tampere, Finland. It was formed in 2002, consisting of Mike Not (best known from his Noise Production solo project) and pHinn (best known as the Webmaster of pHinnWeb music and culture site). Their approach is eclectic, combining influences from electro, electropop, techno music and synthpop to psychedelic and experimental music.

Kompleksi has created collaboration tracks with Citizen Omega, Club Telex Noise Ensemble, Maxx Klaxon, Polytron, Tuomas Rantanen and Unidentified Sound Objects. Officially published so far are the 7" single (I Ain't No) Lovechild/Moscow 1980, the longplay album Sister Longlegs Dances In The Disco, plus appearances on the compilations of pHinnMilk Recordings (Finland), Mate Recordings (UK), Bunker Records (NL), White Label Music (UK) and 267 lattajjaa (FIN).

American duo Javelin included in 2010 a cover version of Kompleksi's track 'Moscow 1980' on their debut album No Más. The same track was also covered in 2013 by Finnish band Sans Parade on Solina Records.

== Singles discography ==
- (I Ain't No) Lovechild/Moscow 1980 (7", Lal Lal Lal, 2005)

== Albums discography ==
- Sister Longlegs Dances In The Disco (digital download, pHinnMilk Recordings, 2007 / limited edition vinyl LP, Verdura Records, 2008)

== Compilations discography ==
- track 'The Only Star In My Sky' on CTNERMX (CDR, pHinnMilk Recordings, 2003)
- track 'The Only Star In My Sky (Tampere Mix)' on Music Is Better: Volume 1 (CD, Mate Recordings, 2004)
- track '(I Ain't No) Lovechild' on Electronic Bible 2 (CD, White Label Music, 2006)
- track 'Porno Tampere' (with Polytron) on Artists Anonymous (12", Bunker Records, 2006)
- track 'Love Missile F1-11' on F2-67, a tribute to Sigue Sigue Sputnik (CD, 267 lattajjaa, 2006)
- track 'Kompleksi' on Lal Lal Lal Festival (C-cassette, Lal Lal Lal, 2008)
- track '(e)motions' on "EurNoVision" (CD/download, Soft Bodies Records, 2015)

== Videography ==
- Sara Pain (directed by Tina Ulevik / Spul Films Australia, 2007)
