= Grand Opening (album) =

Studio album by Geggy Tah
- Released: May 10, 1994
- Recorded: 1993–1994
- Genre: Alternative rock, funk rock, experimental music
- Length: 51:44
- Label: Warner/WEA; Luaka Bop
- Producer: Greg Kurstin; Susan Rogers; Tommy Jordan; David Byrne (exec.); Yale Evelev (exec.)

Geggy Tah chronology
Grand Opening (1994)	Sacred Cow (1996)

Singles from Grand Opening
- 1. "Go" Released: 1994

Grand Opening is the critically acclaimed debut album by Geggy Tah, released in 1994. The band toured with Toad the Wet Sprocket in support of the album.

== Critical reception ==
Professional ratings
Review scores
Source	Rating
AllMusic	3/5 stars
Rolling Stone	3.5/5 stars
Stafford Post	9/10 stars

Grand Opening was widely praised by music critics and scholars. Rolling Stone's review of Grand Opening stated that "The duo's classical and jazz backgrounds prop up songs whose structural inventiveness rewards saturation listening after the first delightful surprise…a debut that creates its own aural planet. Positively surreal." Billboard music critic Timothy White was similarly effusive: "...the beguiling music is wiser than the accumulation of its quasi-whimsical ingredients. The material gleams with a wacky-brilliant tenderness, appreciative of the subtle human tension between observation and impulse. And no matter how haphazard they might seem, each of the 15 tracks on Grand Opening has a sleek, pointy groove, hitching the melody to one's psyche with the keen handiness of a hat pin...Grand Opening...defies every structural statute in the rock bylaws, doling out precise harmonies, static-stuttered atonal bleats, old-school hip-hop time signatures and square-dancing breakdowns, plus jazz-pop bouquets of soda bottle trumpets, dulcimers, steel drums, pounded tabletops, and non-sequitur background discussions." Jon Pareles in the New York Times noted that "the band uses the repetition that's at the core of funk, but its songs free-associate with the capriciousness of dreams. The riffs migrate among instruments as the songs mutate from style to style: slow and midtempo funk, hard rock, Brazilian pop and Congolese-pygmy vocal hoots and syncopations."

== Track listing ==
All lyrics written by Tommy Jordan, except as noted, and all music written by Tommy Jordan & Greg Kurstin.

1. "Last Word (The One for Her)" – 4:32
2. "Go" – 5:00
3. "L.A. Lujah" – 3:39
4. "Giddy Up" – 3:09
5. "P. Sluff" – 4:07
6. "Tucked In" – 2:51
7. "Fasterthan..." – 1:32
8. "Who's in a Hurry?" – 3:06
9. "Intro" – 1:20
10. "Ovary Z's" – 4:12
11. "Bomb Fishing" – 3:26
12. "Crack of Dawn" – 3:59
13. "(Ghost of P. Sluff)" – 3:21
14. "Welcome into the World (Birthday Song)" (lyrics by Jordan & Kurstin) – 4:14
