= Sacred Cow (album) =

Studio album by Geggy Tah
- Released: April 23, 1996
- Recorded: 1995
- Genre: Alternative rock, funk rock
- Length: 50:16
- Label: Warner/WEA; Luaka Bop
- Producer: Greg Kurstin; Susan Rogers; Tommy Jordan; David Byrne (exec.); Yale Evelev (exec.)

Geggy Tah chronology
Grand Opening (1994)	Sacred Cow (1996)	Into the Oh (2001)

Singles from Sacred Cow
- 1. "Whoever You Are" Released: 1996; 2. "Lotta Stuff" Released: 1996

Professional ratings
Review scores
Source	Rating
AllMusic	3/5 stars
The Encyclopedia of Popular Music	3/5 stars
Entertainment Weekly	B

Sacred Cow is an album by Geggy Tah, released in 1996. It contains "Whoever You Are," a number-16 hit on the US Billboard Modern Rock Tracks chart. The band toured with Sting, Soul Coughing, and Barenaked Ladies in support of the album.

== Critical reception ==
Entertainment Weekly called the album "another fine, goofunky mess, chockful of weird hooks and dance-feverish energy." The Nation wrote that the band "is carving out a place devoted to fey weirdness, edgy grooves, and realityskewing lyrics." Trouser Press wrote: "Sacred Cow continues the duo’s tactful progression towards a modern version of Steely Dan-dom." The Boston Globe noted that the album "seems to take its strength from a core of fluid, funky jazz-rock fusion. It sounds as if Donald Fagen of Steely Dan were recruited to join the Presidents of the United States of America."

== Track listing ==
All songs written by Tommy Jordan & Greg Kurstin, except as noted.

1. "Granddad's Opening Address" (Granddaddy Giordano Jordan) – 0:29
2. "Whoever You Are" – 4:33
3. "Lotta Stuff" (Tommy Jordan) – 3:10
4. "Century Plant 2000" – 6:17
5. "Sacred Cow" (Tommy Jordan) – 5:02
6. "House of Usher (Inside)" (Tommy Jordan) – 3:58
7. "Don't Close the Door" – 4:10
8. "Such a Beautiful Night" (Tommy Jordan) – 3:53
9. "She Withers" – 4:09
10. "Las Vegas with the Lights Out" – 3:27
11. "Mem" (Tommy Jordan) – 4:39
12. "Shed" (Tommy Jordan) – 3:45
13. "Gina" – 2:45
