= CTNE =

CTNE may refer to:

- Compañía Telefónica Nacional de España, a Spanish multinational telecommunications company
- Club Telex Noise Ensemble, a project of Finnish musician pHinn
