= A Society in Which No Tear Is Shed Is Inconceivably Mediocre =

Studio album by Yoñlu
- Released: April 14, 2009
- Genre: Electronic
- Length: 40:55
- Label: Luaka Bop

Professional ratings
Review scores
Source	Rating
AllMusic	4/5 stars
The Guardian	4/5 stars
The Telegraph	3/5 stars
Robert Christgau	3/5 stars

A Society in Which No Tear Is Shed Is Inconceivably Mediocre, released in 2009 by Luaka Bop, is a posthumous album by Yoñlu. His father, Luis, discovered the tracks and, deciding that they should be heard, sent an album's worth of material to a small Brazilian label.

== Critical reception ==
Thom Jurek of AllMusic writes, "This may be the only recording we ever get to hear from Yonlu, but as such, it is a treasure trove of complexity, mystery, and redemptive art. Indeed, this is bedsit music elevated to the realm of high art."

Will Hodgkinson of The Guardian concludes his review with, "Sophisticated and suffused with a precocious wisdom, Yonlu's sole album is filled not with teenage angst but reflection: even the prophetic Suicide has an air of tender resignation to it."

Derek Emery of Treblezine wrote, "Even through his songs Vinicius Marques was unable to overcome the pain that he felt defined his existence, although he certainly recognized and admired the expressive power of music."

Mark Hudson of The Telegraph writes, "If nothing among these posthumous fragments quite coheres into a great song, there are enough delightful moments to suggest the loss of a major talent."

Robert Christgau gives the album 3 stars and says, "16-year-old Brazilian lo-fi adept explains why he's about to kill himself and demonstrates why he shouldn't have--conclusively, I hope ("Estrela, Estrela," "Katie Don't Be Depressed")."

== Track listing ==
All tracks are written by Yoñlu, except "Estrela, Estrela" by Vitor Ramil and "Little Kids" by Kings Of Convenience

No.	Title	Length
1.	"I Know What It’s Like"	3:03
2.	"A Boy and a Tiger"	5:45
3.	"Humiliation"	1:58
4.	"Polyalphabetic Cipher"	3:58
5.	"Qtip"	3:34
6.	"Little Kids"	1:21
7.	"Katie Don't Be Depressed"	3:43
8.	"Deskjet" (Remix with Sabrepulse)	1:18
9.	"Estrela, Estrela"	3:21
10.	"Olhe Por Nós"	1:55
11.	"Suicide"	2:00
12.	"Luana (Mecânica Celeste Aplicada)"	3:35
13.	"Phrygian"	1:30
14.	"Waterfall"	3:54
Total length:		40:55

- Track information and credits adapted from the Discogs and AllMusic.
