= Eco de Sombras =

Studio album by Susana Baca
- Released: 2000
- Genre: Afro-Peruvian music
- Label: Luaka Bop
- Producer: Craig Street

Susana Baca chronology
Susana Baca (1997)	Eco de Sombras (2000)	Lamento Negro (2001)

Eco de Sombras is an album by the Peruvian musician Susana Baca, released in 2000. Baca sang in Spanish; the album title translates to "echo of shadows". The album peaked at No. 7 on Billboard's World Albums chart.

== Production ==
The album was produced by Craig Street. It was in part recorded over six weeks at Baca's house, in Lima, Peru. Baca would often record at night, and then make a meal for the musicians. The album made use of cajones and checos. "Poema" is a Carlos Oquendo de Amat poem set to music. "Golpe E' Tierra" was inspired by the Marinera.

Marc Ribot, Greg Cohen, Greg Leisz, and John Medeski were among the musicians who contributed to Eco de Sombras. Label head David Byrne played the charango.

== Critical reception ==
Professional ratings
Review scores
Source	Rating
AllMusic	4/5 stars
The Encyclopedia of Popular Music	3/5 stars
Los Angeles Daily News	3.5/4 stars
Orlando Sentinel	4.5/5 stars
Rolling Stone	3.5/5 stars

The Austin Chronicle called the album "a natural-sounding collection of mostly mid-tempo, smoldering, and sinewy songs, replete with fun little melodic explorations like the long instrumental outro of closer 'Xanahari'." The Chicago Reader wrote that "Baca's longtime quartet makes the songs sound simultaneously timeless and contemporary, elasticizing the spare percussive grooves–played on traditional instruments ... and filling the space between them with billowy, hypnotic bass and acoustic guitar figures." The Independent concluded that "it's a revelation, happily played at the quietest of volumes, when Baca's voice sounds like a siren's whisper."

The Boston Globe stated that "poems of love, sorrow, and nostalgia refer to the black experience both in colonial and present-day Peru." The Wall Street Journal determined that "Baca's suave, fervent singing is supported at the core by David Pinto's bass, Raphael Munoz's guitar, and a variety of percussion instruments." The Chicago Tribune opined that, "unlike the Brazilian Virginia Rodrigues or Cape Verde's Cesaria Evora, Baca's instrument is not so much celestial as an earthly delight." The Windsor Star listed it as the fifth best album of 2000.

AllMusic wrote that "Baca's voice is smooth, her songs and world darkly sinister... Yet another worthy effort from a woman who refuses to pander to the nouveau hippie crowd."

== Track listing ==
No.	Title	Length
1.	"De los Amores"
2.	"Valentin"
3.	"Poema"
4.	"Los Amantes"
5.	"El Mayoral"
6.	"La Macorina"
7.	"Golpe e' Tierra"
8.	"Panalivio/Zancudito"
9.	"Reina Mortal"
10.	"Xanaharí"
