= Mingering Mike =

American artist (born 1950)

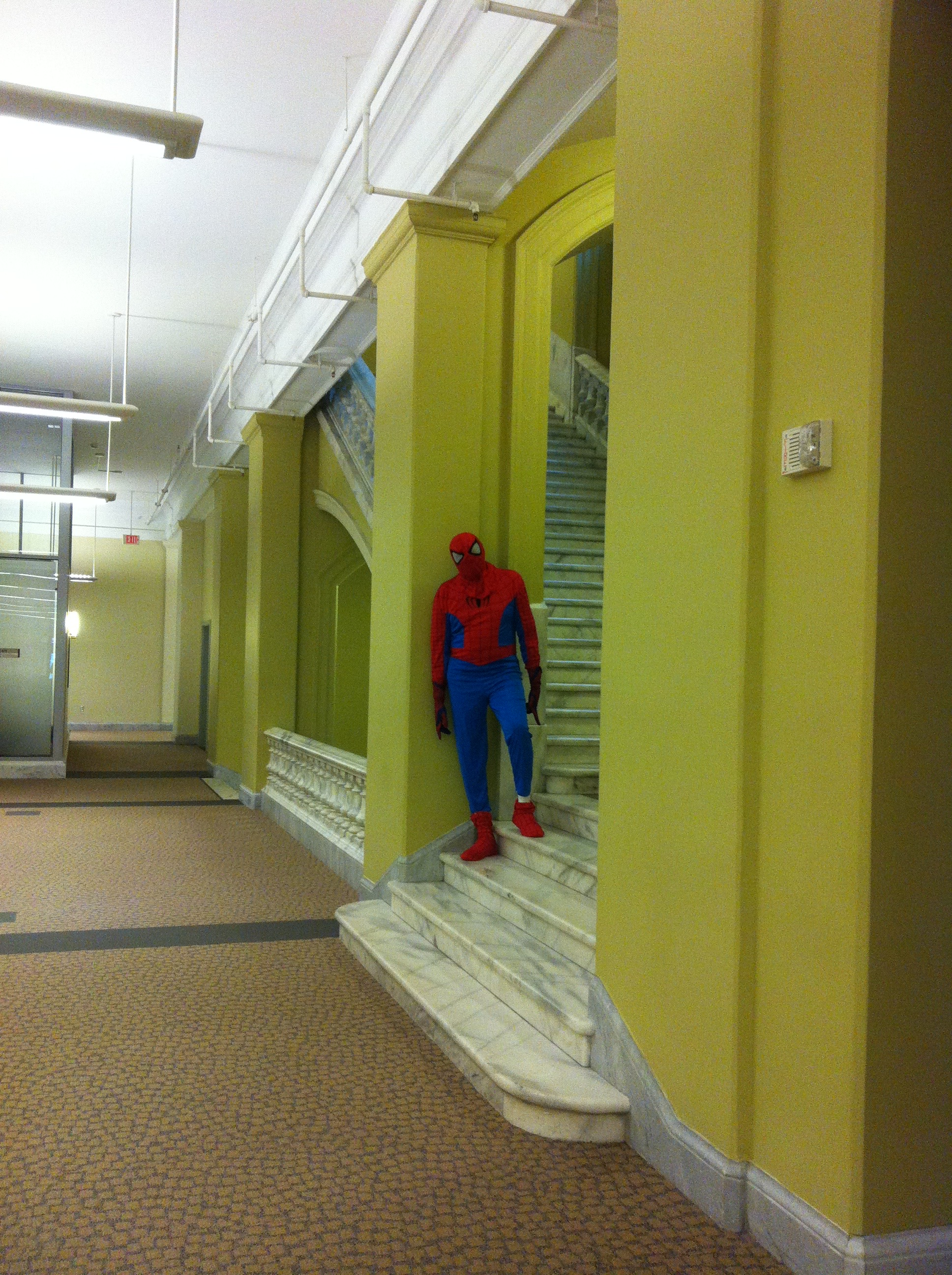
- Mike in 2013
- Born: 1950 (age 75–76); Washington, D.C., U.S.
- Education: Self-taught
- Known for: Fictional album covers
- Website: www.mingeringmike.com

Mingering Mike (born 1950) is a pseudonymous American outsider artist known for his imaginary music career in the 1960s and 1970s. During this time, he wrote over four thousand songs and produced hundreds of fictional record albums, complete with illustrated sleeves and handwritten labels.

His creations were discovered at a flea market in 2003, garnering international attention. His work has been exhibited at a number of museums, including the Smithsonian. Mike has chosen to remain anonymous throughout his career, attending public events and exhibitions in disguise.

== Early life and education ==
Mingering Mike was born in Washington, D.C. in 1950, the youngest of seven children. When he was five years old, his mother died and his father "disappeared". His older brothers, Roland and Carl, both enlisted to serve in the army, leaving him in the custody of his older sister Cathy and her alcoholic husband.

He attended Lasalle-Backus Elementary School in D.C. and later went to McKinley Technology High School "for a month" before dropping out. In 1968, he took night classes at Spingarn High School. By this time, he had lived in 13 different neighborhoods. He has cited Dean Martin, Sammy Davis Jr., Tony Bennett, and Bing Crosby as early inspiration for his imaginary career.

As a teenager, he created and wrote real songs with the help of his family members. Relatives would provide percussion for Mike's songs, with one cousin occasionally rolling up a piece of paper and blowing through it to replicate trumpet noises. Mike attributed his love of drawing to his mother, with whom he shared few memories.

== Fictional music career ==
One of Mike's fictional album covers, titled 3 Footsteps Away From the Altar and featuring another fictional artist named The Big "D". Both the obverse and reverse show track listings of fictional songs, as well as credits for studio and production company.

Mike was active between 1968 and 1977, during which time he wrote over 4,000 songs and drew hundreds of fictional labels and album covers. Most of his work consisted of hand-drawn record sleeves and cardboard "vinyl" records that imitate the format of commercial releases. His creations included illustrated album covers, handwritten track lists and fictional record labels and featuring artists. The name Mingering Mike comes from the street sign "merging traffic". Mike stated that he "twisted the word in his head" to create 'mingering'.

Mike's early works focused on love, heartbreak and relationships. In 1969, he was drafted to serve in the Vietnam War. After completing basic training the following year, he was instructed to report to Seattle for duty. While on travel leave, he did not report returned home to Washington and into a quiet hiding, keeping a low profile. During this period, Mike spent much of his time creating fictional albums, focusing heavily on the Vietnam War as well as poverty, drug abuse, and the civil rights movement. In 1977, Mike and other draft dodgers were pardoned by President Jimmy Carter, and he stopped creating album covers and writing songs.

After being pardoned, Mike was able to work again and became an administrative assistant, a building maintenance engineer and a security guard. His creations were put into storage, and were later unintentionally forfeited after missed payments.

=== Discovery in 2003 ===
Mingering Mike's work remained unknown to the public for several decades. In 2003, record collector and dealer Dori Hadar purchased a large set of Mike's handmade record sleeves at a flea market in Washington, D.C. After realizing that the records were hand-constructed hoaxes, Hadar posted photos of his purchases on an online record forum, where they gained traction. He began researching their origin and noticed that on one of Mike's earliest creations, he had put down his actual name. Hadar continued to investigate, looking through court records until he discovered Mike's last known address, leading him to the man behind Mingering Mike, who has chosen to remain anonymous.

Since his works were discovered, Mike has made a number of public appearances in disguises, having notably accepted an award from the D.C. City Council in a Spider-Man suit. At a Smithsonian panel discussion, Mike wore surgical scrubs and a mask and jokingly offered to perform colonoscopies.

== Later work ==
=== Musical career ===
In 2007, Vanguard Records issued a vinyl single titled There's Nothing Wrong With You Baby, recorded 38 years prior by Mingering Mike and his cousin. The vinyls were delivered inside a picture sleeve with custom color labels designed by Mike. 1000 limited edition records were created as part of the release, each coming with a hand-written message from Mike.

In 2008, Mike performed at South by Southwest, where he also hosted a musical showcase for Ubiquity Records.

=== Artworks ===
In 2010, the soul band Kings Go Forth released the album The Outsiders Are Back, titled after Mike's 1971 fictional creation of the same name. The album cover was created by Mike.

In 2013, Mike released a collection of portraits depicting D.C. councilmembers. Council chair Anita Bonds described his portrayals as "spot-on". Many of the councilmembers were reportedly satisfied with their depictions, though councilmember Yvette Alexander told the Washington City Paper that her portrait was an inaccurate depiction of her, and that she would have to purchase it "to get it off the street".

In 2017, Mike released The HUGE Breaking of America, a fictional LP record album criticizing Donald Trump. The album's single was titled Clueless.

As part of a 2023 exhibition of his work, Mike sketched a depiction of the album cover of Funkadelic's Maggot Brain.

== Exhibitions ==
Hadar's discovery led to exhibitions and publications documenting Mingering Mike's works. He held his first gallery opening in 2007 in Washington, D.C. with the help of George Hemphill. In 2013, the Smithsonian American Art Museum acquired Mike's entire record collection, which was displayed two years later in an exhibition titled Mingering Mike's Supersonic Greatest Hits. Some of his pieces remain in the museum permanently.

In 2010, the Nasher Museum of Art at Duke University launched a traveling exhibition titled The Record, Contemporary ART and VINYL. The exhibition included 27 of Mingering Mike's creations. In 2023, the Martin Luther King Jr. Memorial Library displayed thirteen albums as well as a number of cabaret posters created by Mike.

== In literature and film ==
In 2007, Hadar published a book documenting the collection and the story behind its discovery titled Mingering Mike: The Amazing Career of an Imaginary Soul Superstar. British journalist Jon Ronson wrote about Hadar and Mike in his 2012 book Lost at Sea.

In 2016, documentarian Jeff Feuerzeig stated that he was working on a new film, Mingering Mike, covering Mike's life story and fictional career but the documentary was never made.
