= Make Believe Mambo =

Single by David Byrne

from the album Rei Momo
- B-side: "Lie to Me"
- Released: 1989
- Genre: Latin; worldbeat
- Length: 5:23; 6:18 (12" version); 4:04 (video version)
- Label: Luaka Bop; Warner Bros.; Sire
- Songwriter: David Byrne
- Producers: David Byrne; Steve Lillywhite

David Byrne singles chronology
"The Last Emperor" (1987)	"Make Believe Mambo" (1989)	"Dirty Old Town" (1989)

Music video
- "Make Believe Mambo" on YouTube

"Make Believe Mambo" is a song by American rock musician David Byrne from his debut solo studio album Rei Momo (1989). The single peaked at No. 11 on the U.S. Modern Rock Tracks chart. The song features Kirsty MacColl and Willie Colón. Its music video features Byrne and two dancers in black-and-white and contains a shorter mix of the song.

== Track listing ==
12" release

1. "Make Believe Mambo" (extended version)
2. "Lie to Me"

7" release

1. "Make Believe Mambo"
2. "Lie to Me"
