= Lijadu Sisters =

Nigerian musical duo (b. 1948)

- Born: Kehinde Lijadu; 22 October 1948; Ibadan, Colonial Nigeria Taiwo Lijadu; 22 October 1948 (age 78); Ibadan, Colonial Nigeria
- Origin: Nigeria
- Died: Kehinde Lijadu; 9 November 2019 (aged 71); New York City, United States
- Genres: Afrobeat; reggae; rock; pop
- Occupations: Singers, songwriters
- Years active: 1965–90, 2014–19
- Labels: Knitting Factory Records; Decca Records; Afrodisia; Shanachie; Numero Group
- Past members: Kehinde Lijadu; Taiwo Lijadu
- Website: thelijadusisters.com

Kehinde Lijadu (22 October 1948 – 9 November 2019) and Taiwo Lijadu (born 22 October 1948) were identical twin sisters from Nigeria who performed as the Lijadu Sisters from the mid-1960s to the 1980s. They achieved success in Nigeria, and also had a more modest success in the United States and Europe. Described as an influential dynamic who mixed Afrobeat sounds with jazz and disco, the sisters retired from the music scene in the late 1980s, reforming and performing sporadically during the 2010s up until Kehinde's death in 2019. They were the cousins of the popular Nigerian musician Fela Kuti.

== Career ==
The twins grew up in the Nigerian city of Ibadan, and were inspired musically by various artists including Aretha Franklin, Victor Olaiya and Miriam Makeba. They had guidance from music producer Lemmy Jackson who is credited with helping them with their early successes. Their music was a mix of Jazz, Afrobeat, Reggae and Waka. Sometimes they sang in English and other times in their native language, Yoruba. One of their first songs was arranged with assistance from jazz saxophone player Orlando Julius. They released their first album Iya Mi Jowo in 1969 after winning a record contract with Decca Records. They worked with the late Biddy Wright on their third album Danger (1976). American rapper Nas sampled "Life's Gone Down Low", a track in the Danger album, as "Life's Gone Low" on his 2006 Mixtape without crediting the duo. The Lijadu Sisters recorded Sunshine in 1978 and Horizon Unlimited in 1979.

The sisters were top stars in Nigeria during the 1970s and 1980s. During these years, they branched out to America and Europe and found modest success. They performed with drummer Ginger Baker's band Salt at the 1972 Munich Olympic Games in Munich at the World Music Festival. The New York Times reported that the sisters were "smiling free spirits" who mixed "sisterly banter and flirtatiousness" in their performances which featured positive messages such as the benefit of returning home. Their reggae number Reincarnation insisted that if reincarnation were a reality, then they would like to be reincarnated again into the home where they grew up. Some of their song lyrics were politically themed. Their harmonies were described as "ethereal".

In 1984 Shanachie Records released Double Trouble in the US which was a compilation of their previously recorded material from their albums Horizon Unlimited and Danger. Their song "Orere Elejigbo" was included on a double CD entitled Nigeria 70, Africa 100, and was added to the Roots & Wings playlist in 1997.

During the 1980s, the sisters moved to Brooklyn, New York. They performed in various venues including the lower Manhattan club Wetlands and in Harlem with King Sunny Adé's African Beats as their backing band. They performed with the Philadelphia-based band Philly Gumbo. They were featured in the music documentary Konkombé by English director Jeremy Marre, and their music was featured in the Nigerian installment of the 14-episode world music series entitled Beats of the Heart which aired on PBS during the late 1980s.

On 1 April 2014, they appeared live at an all-star tribute, the Atomic Bomb! Band, for reclusive Nigerian musician William Onyeabor at the Barbican Centre in London. They sang some of their own tracks including "Danger", as well as providing backing and lead vocals on William Onyeabor material. They also performed with the Atomic Bomb! Band on The Tonight Show Starring Jimmy Fallon and on tour dates in New York, San Francisco and Los Angeles in May 2014.

On 9 November 2019, Kehinde suffered a stroke and died on the same day, at the age of 71.

In July 2024, The Numero Group announced they would be remastering and reissuing the duo's discography, with plans to include vinyl, CD and streaming platforms. Horizon Unlimited was released in late 2024, and Danger was released June 27, 2025.

== Reviews ==
- The New York Times music critic Jon Pareles described their music as "a West African parallel to the Pointer Sisters" with a mix of Nigerian Afro-beat, reggae, South African pop with elements of disco and "Memphis soul". Critic Peter Watrous described the sisters sound as "riveting".
- Reviewer Myles Boisen in All Music Guide wrote that they were "a rarity in the African music scene" and added that they were "liberated twin sisters who share the spotlight on smooth close harmonies and command a sharp, inventive backing band."

== Discography ==
Lijadu Sisters
Title	Year	Label	Type	Band	Notes
Iya Mi Jowo / Jikele – Maweni	1969	Decca	album	Lijadu Sisters	title means "Mother, please"
Danger	1976	Decca, Afrodisia	album (LP)	Lijadu Sisters	Ade Jolaoso (bass), Johny Shittu (keyboards), Biddy Wright (guitar, saxophone, drums)
Mother Africa	1977	Afrodisia, Decca	album (LP)	Lijadu Sisters	
Sunshine	1978	Afrodisia	album (LP)	Lijadu Sisters	Biddy Wright (producer, various instruments), Candido Obajimi (drums), Gboyega Adelaja (keyboards), Jerry Ihejeto (bass)
Horizon Unlimited	1979	Afrodisia	album (LP)	Lijadu Sisters	two versions available; second source says 1983 release Musicians: Friday Jumbo on cleffs and ekwe, Buttley Moore, Nelly Uchendu on drums.
Double Trouble	1984		album	Lijadu Sisters	
"Orere Eligjigbo"	1997	Shanachie	single	Lijadu Sisters	
