= Afro-Peruvian Classics: The Soul of Black Peru =

Compilation album by Various artists
- Released: May 30, 1995
- Recorded: Various Times
- Genre: Música criolla
- Label: Luaka Bop
- Compiler: David Byrne

Afro-Peruvian Classics: The Soul of Black Peru is a 1995 album. The album was compiled by American musician David Byrne (of the band Talking Heads), and was one of the first international releases of Afro-Peruvian music.

== Track listing ==
| No. | Title | Artist | Length |
|---|---|---|---|
| 1. | "Maria Lando" | Susana Baca |
| 2. | "Yo No Soy Jaqui" | Manuel Donayre |
| 3. | "Canterurias" | Cecilia Barraza |
| 4. | "Samba Malato" | Lucila Campos |
| 5. | "Enciendete Candela" | Conjunto Gente Morena & Roberto Rivas |
| 6. | "Azucar de Caña" | Eva Ayllon |
| 7. | "Prendeme la Vela" | Abelardo Vasquez & Cumanana |
| 8. | "Landó" | Chabuca Granda |
| 9. | "Toro Mata" | Lucila Campos |
| 10. | "Son de los Diablos" | Peru Negro |
| 11. | "No Me Cumben" | Nicomedes Santa Cruz |
| 12. | "Una Larga Noche" | Chabuca Granda |
| 13. | "Lando" | Perú Negro |
| 14. | "Maria Lando" | David Byrne |
| 15. | "Zapateo en Menor" (Hidden track) | Vicente Vásquez |

== See also ==
- Música criolla
