= Pretaluz =

Studio album by Waldemar Bastos
- Released: 1998
- Genre: Angolan music
- Label: Luaka Bop
- Producer: Arto Lindsay

Waldemar Bastos chronology
Pitanga Madura (1992)	Pretaluz (1998)	Renascence (2004)

Pretaluz is an album by the Angolan musician Waldemar Bastos, released in 1998. The lyrics are in Portuguese; album title translates to "Blacklight". It incorporated elements of zouk, morna, semba, and fado. Pretaluz was banned from Angolan radio.

== Production ==
Recorded in New York City, the album was produced by Arto Lindsay. "Rainha Ginga" is about the Angolan queen Nzinga of Ndongo and Matamba. Other songs are about the Angolan Civil War.

== Critical reception ==
Professional ratings
Review scores
Source	Rating
AllMusic	4/5 stars
Robert Christgau	(3-star Honorable Mention)
MusicHound World: The Essential Album Guide	4/5 stars
Orlando Sentinel	4/5 stars

The New York Times called Pretaluz "one of the great, overlooked records of 1998," writing that, "with his dramatic pauses and dynamic vibrato rising above subtle rhythms picked out on nylon-string guitars, everything Mr. Bastos sings emerges as a lament of enormous sadness." The Chicago Reader wrote that "the saudade and semba are there, but also traces of Afro-Cuban rhythms (a significant Cuban force came to Angola to help fight UNITA in 1975) and Brazilian pop."

Robert Christgau praised "Morro do Kussava" and "Kuribôta", noting the "crystalline vision of pan-African bliss." The Orlando Sentinel stated that "the exile's longing comes through in songs such as 'Sofrimento' and 'Querida Angola', even without the translations from the Portuguese found in the liner notes." The Independent declared: "The most sublime release in some time from David Byrne's world-music label, Pretaluz ... is a masterpiece of restrained flamboyance, a blend of spry African styles which invoke the personal as the political, the whole imbued with a generosity of spirit." The Dallas Morning News listed the album as the second best of 1998.

AllMusic wrote that "few artists of any nation have created such a passionate and human statement on political themes as Waldemar Bastos, while at the same time, expertly explores musical styles from across the African continent."

== Track listing ==
No.	Title	Length
1.	"Sofrimento"
2.	"Rainha Ginga"
3.	"Muxima"
4.	"Kuribôta"
5.	"Morro do Kussava"
6.	"Minha Familia"
7.	"Menina"
8.	"Querida Angola"
9.	"Kanguru"
