= Los de Abajo (band) =

Mexican band

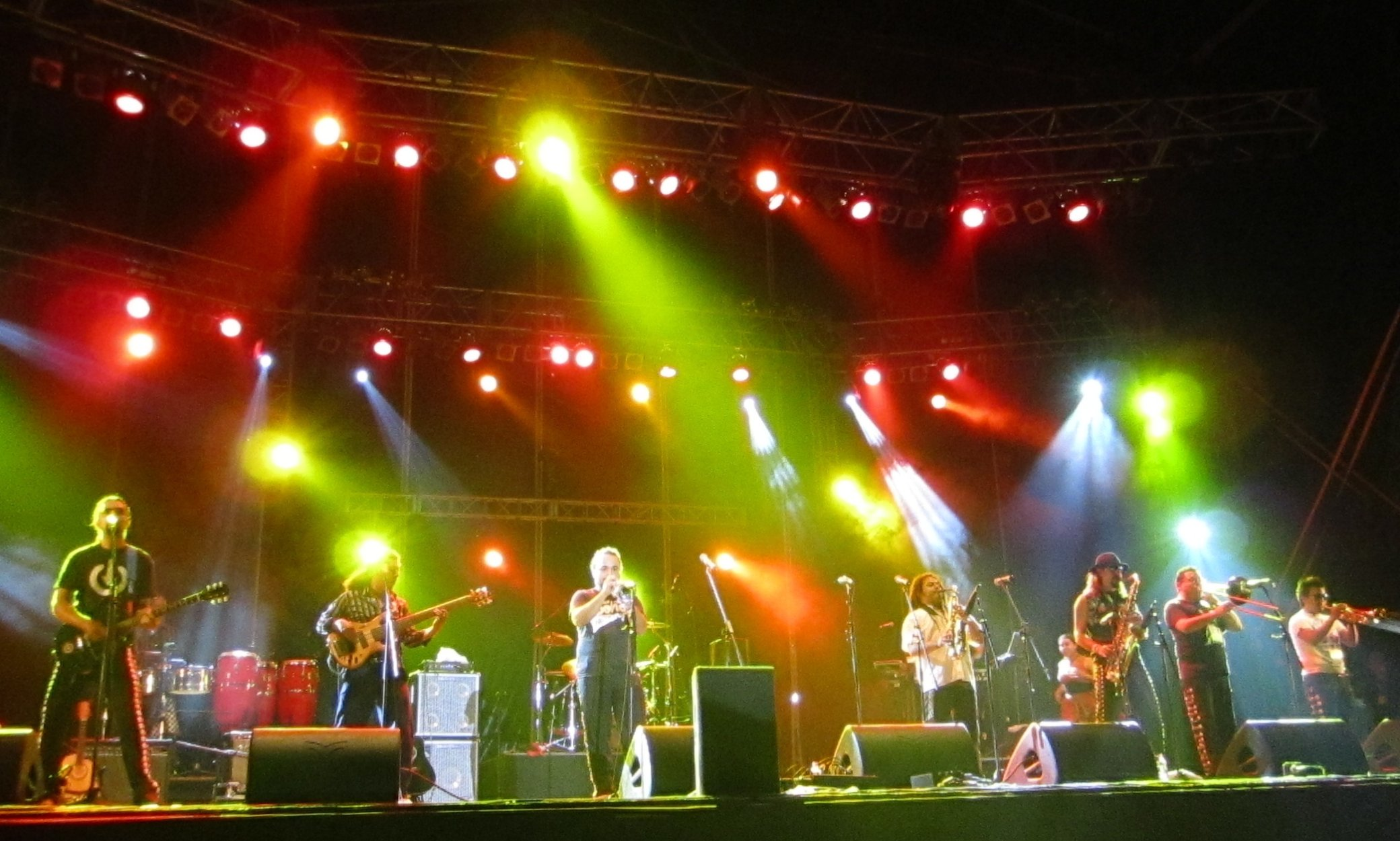
Los De Abajo at Sziget Festival in 2010.

Los de Abajo are a band from Mexico City founded in 1992 as a Latin ska four-piece. Since then they have expanded to eight members and widened their musical influences to include rock, salsa, reggae, ska, cumbia, Son Jarocho and banda sinaloense. Founder member Liber Terán is the main vocalist and writes many of the songs, although all band members receive equal pay for their contributions.

The band was unable to secure a record deal in Mexico, as their music was considered to be insufficiently commercial, and ended up releasing their first album Latin Ska Force independently. However, in 1999 they secured a deal with David Byrne's Luaka Bop record label to release their international debut, Los de Abajo.

The four founding members of the band were Carlos Cuevas (piano, manubrium organ, synthesizer and accordion, composer), Liber Terán (vocals and guitars and composer), Vladimir Garnica (guitar, tres, jarana, requinto, and Spanish guitar), and Yocupitzio Arrellano (drums and producer). Later they were joined by Luis Robles "Gori" (electric bass), Mariano "El Ché Pereira" (saxophones), Gabriel Elias (percussion), Daniel Vallejo (saxophones), Canek Cabrera (trumpet) and Carlos Alberto Cortez Ortega (El COCA, his initials) (bassist).

The follow-up Cybertropic Chilango Power was released in 2002 and won BBC Radio 3's World Music Award for the Americas. 2006's LDA v The Lunatics saw them continue to absorb influences from around the world and included a Spanish-language version of The Fun Boy Three song "The Lunatics (Have Taken Over The Asylum)", featuring Neville Staples.

The band are supporters of the Zapatista Army of National Liberation and have played benefit shows for the revolutionary group. The Zapatistas' Comandante Esther features on "Resistencia", the first track on LDA v The Lunatics.

== Discography ==
- Los de Abajo (1998, Luaka Bop)
- Cybertropic Chilango Power (2002, Luaka Bop)
- Latin Ska Force (2002, PP Lobo)
- Complete & Live '04 (2004, Kufala)
- LDA v The Lunatics (2005, RealWorld Records)
- No Borrarán (2006, Independiente)
- Actitud Calle (2010, Pentagrama)
- Mariachi Beat (2014)
