= Susana Baca =

Peruvian singer, songwriter and politician (born 1944)

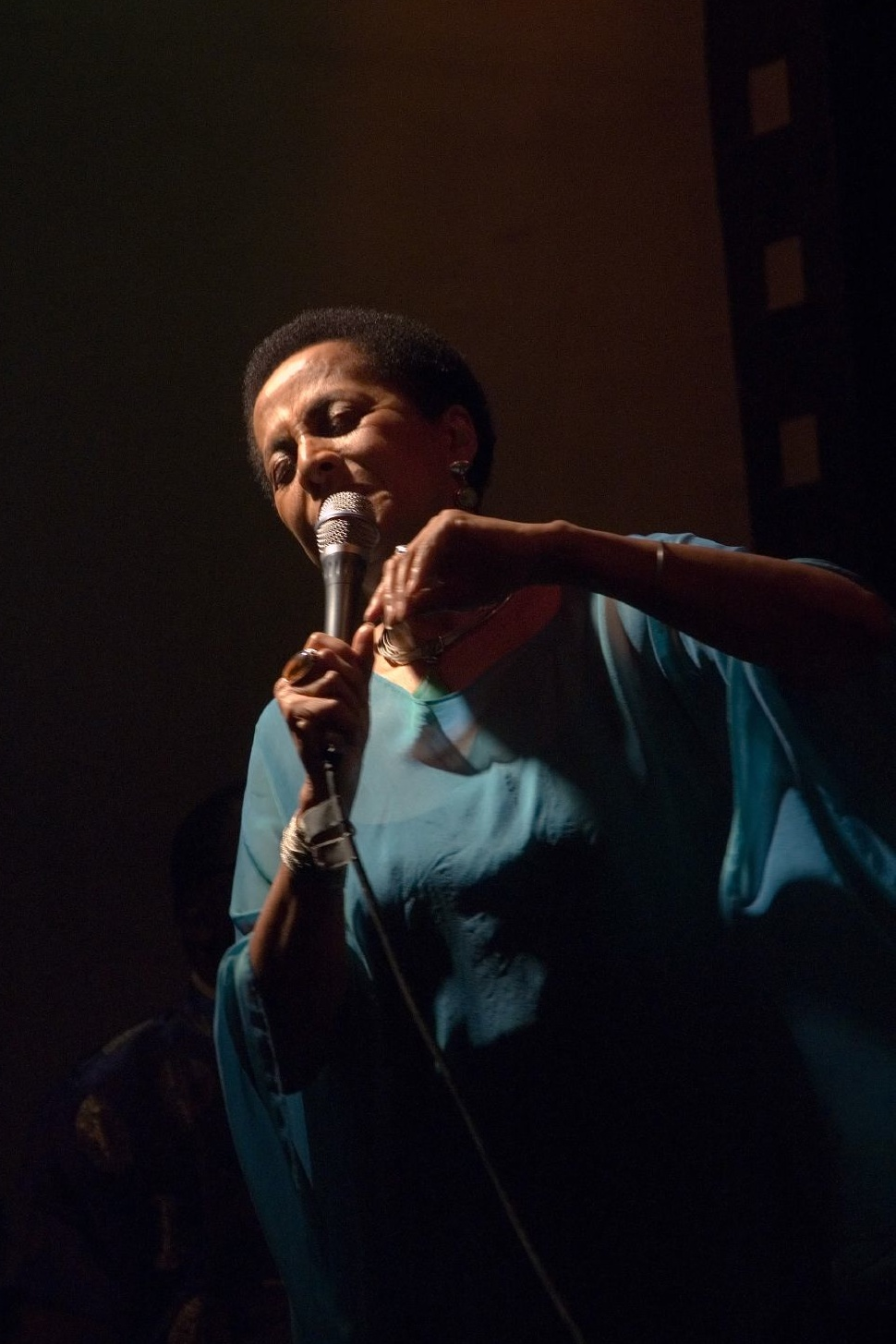
- Baca in Santa Cruz, 17 April 2010

2nd Minister of Culture
- In office 28 July 2011 – 10 December 2011
- President: Ollanta Humala
- Preceded by: Juan Ossio Acuña
- Succeeded by: Luis Peirano Falconí

Personal details
- Born: 24 May 1944 (age 82) Chorrillos, Lima Province, Peru
- Occupation: Singer-singer, songwriter, educator and politician

Susana Esther Baca de la Colina (Spanish pronunciation: [suˈsana ˈβaka]; born 24 May 1944) is a prominent Peruvian singer-songwriter, school teacher, folklorist, ethnomusicologist and three-time Latin Grammy Award winner. She has been a key figure in the revival of Afro-Peruvian music.

In July 2011, she was named Peru's Minister of Culture in the Ollanta Humala government, becoming the second Afro-Peruvian cabinet minister in the history of independent Peru.

In November 2011, Baca was elected to the Organization of American States (OAS) as the President of the Commission of Culture for the period 2011–13.

== Career ==
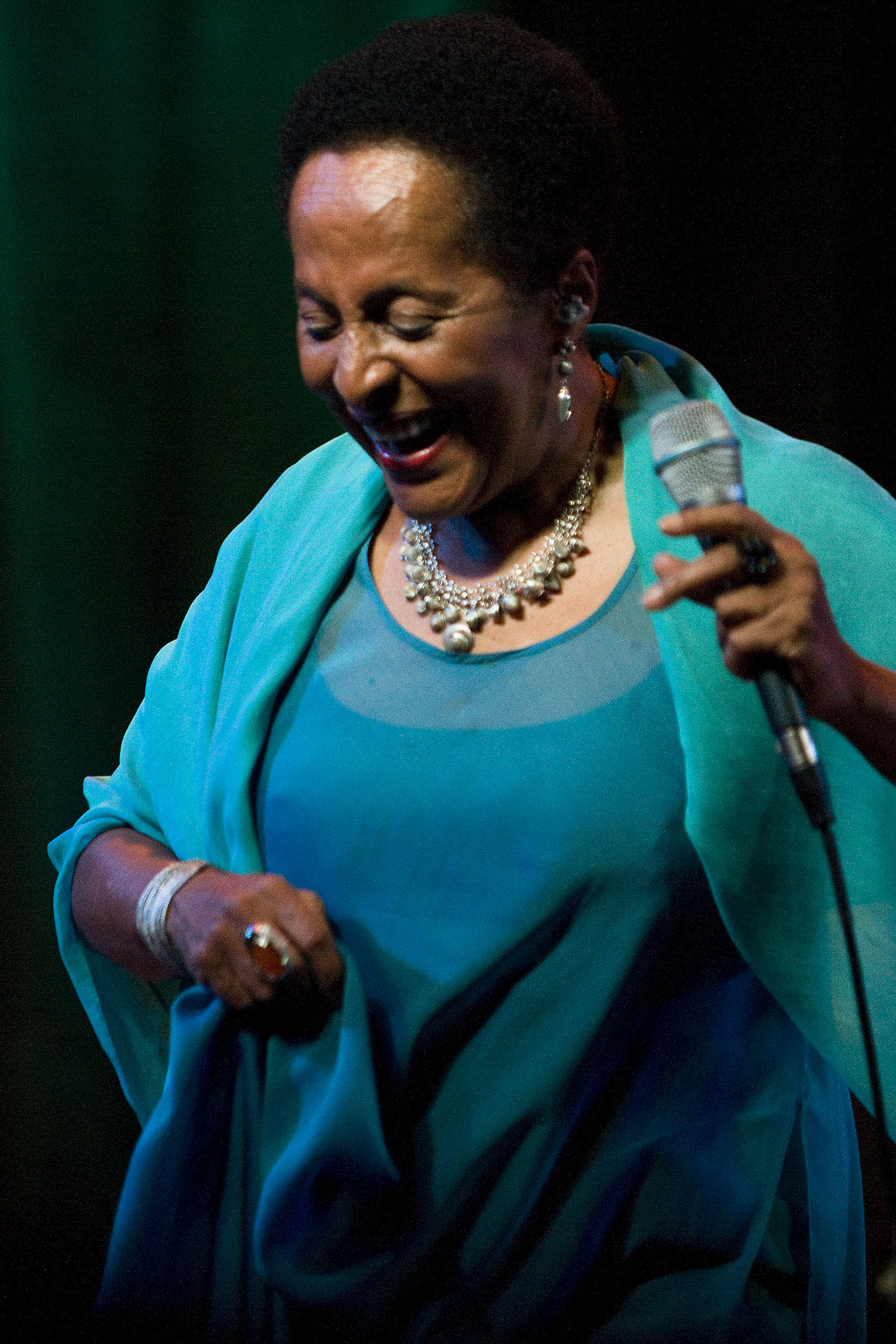
Baca performing in 2006

Susana Baca was born and grew up in a coastal fishing village, Chorrillos, a district of the Lima Province of Peru, and part of greater Lima. Her music is a mixture of traditional and contemporary. Her backing band features indigenous Peruvian instruments such as the cajón ("wooden box", whose origins lie in an upturned fruit crate), udu (clay pot), and quijada (jawbone of a burro) cheko a dried gourd, as well as acoustic guitar and electric upright baby bass. Although many of her songs are based on traditional forms such as the landó or vals, she also incorporates elements of Cuban and Brazilian music. Her debut album for the label Luaka Bop, produced by Greg Landau, brought her to the attention of World Music audiences worldwide.

Baca is an important figure in the revival of Afro-Peruvian music within Peru (see, for example, dancers from the Perú Negro troupe, as well as "Festejo" music), which, like the culture that produced it, had previously been little recognized, but which is now regarded as an important part of Peruvian culture. Baca has contributed much to its international popularity, which began in 1995 with the release of the compilation CD Afro-Peruvian Classics: The Soul of Black Peru. The album, featuring the Baca song "Maria Lando", was released by the Luaka Bop record label, which belongs to ex-Talking Heads frontman David Byrne.

== Reviews ==
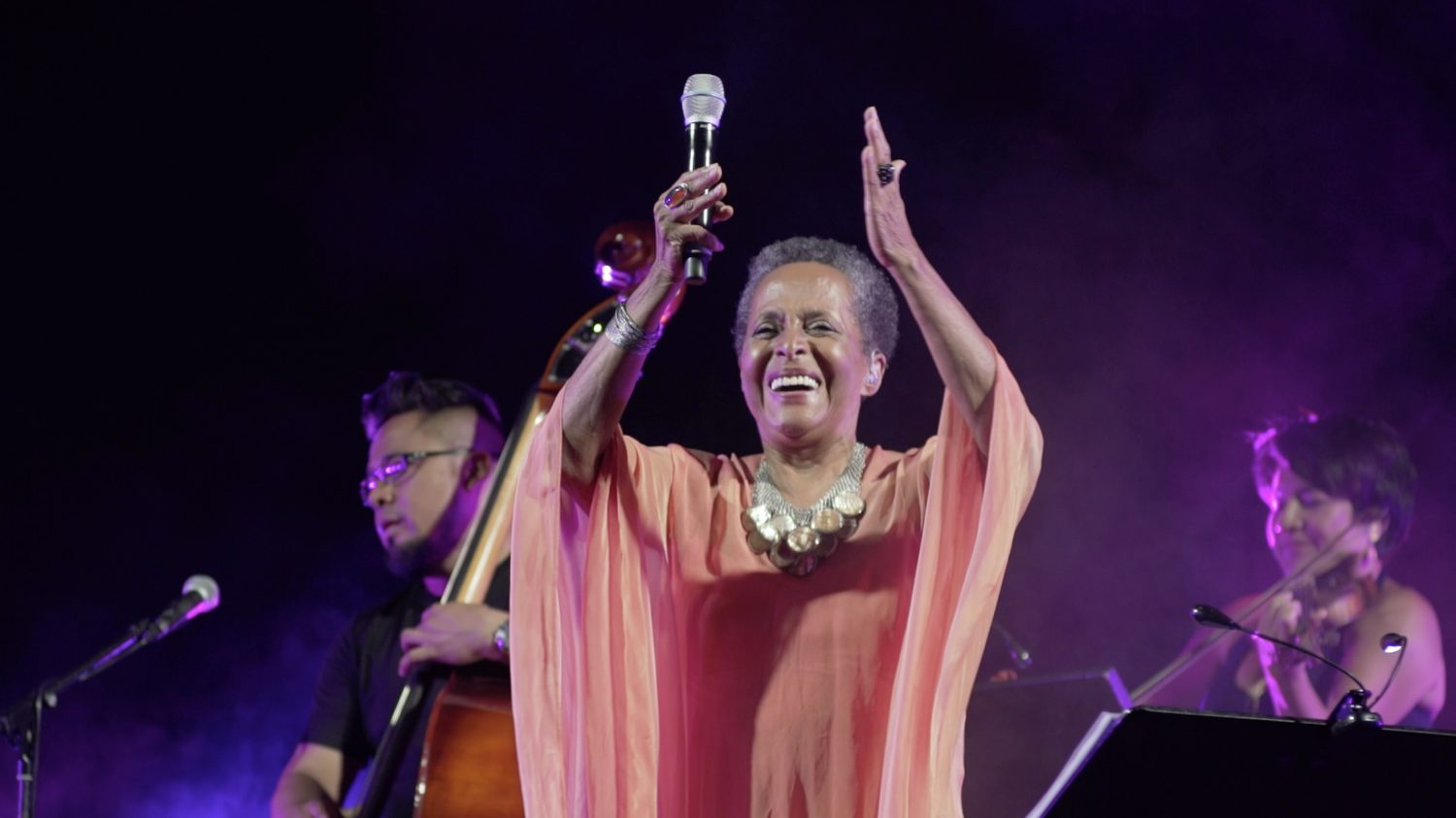
Baca performing in 2017

Baca's work has received praise from various critics for its musicality as well as cultural impact. Michael Heumann from Stylus Magazine has said: "Maria Lando put Susana Baca on the world music map. Since then, she has released a number of very popular albums, most on Luaka Bop, and all of incredibly high quality."

Timothy G. Merello from PopMatters said of her performance in Old Town School of Folk Music, Chicago: "Susana Baca, more than just a singer, is a poet, a historian, a spelunker and explorer of Afro-Peruvian folklore and music [...] she and her band entertain, educate and entrance a sold out crowd with a musical melange of rhythms, melodies, beats, and dance."

While Deanne Sole, also from PopMatters, says of Baca's 2009 album Seis Poemas (Six Poems): "After watching Peruvian singer Susana Baca perform on an open stage in burning heat with malfunctioning equipment, one can't help but respect Baca not only as a voice but as a performer, as a person [...] Seis Poemas, a small album but a charming one."

Baca founded the Instituto Negrocontinuo (Black Continuum Institute) in her seafront home in Chorrillos, to foster the collection, preservation and creation of Afro-Peruvian culture, music and dance.

== Awards ==
In 2001, Baca received a nomination for the Grammy Award for "Best Traditional Tropical Latin Album" for her album Canto.

In 2002, she won the Latin Grammy Award for Best Folk Album, for her album Lamento Negro.

In November 2011, she won the second Latin Grammy of her career for her collaboration with urban group Calle 13 on the song "Latinoamérica", which was recorded in Peru, also featuring Brazilian singer-songwriter Maria Rita and Colombian recording artist Totó la Momposina.

In 2017, she received Peru's National Culture Award.

Baca's 2020 album A Capella was nominated for Best Folk Album at the 21st Annual Latin Grammy Awards. She ended up winning the award and said she dedicated it to the Peruvian youth, specially those who work on building Perú higher every day.

== Political career ==
In July 2011, the newly elected President of Peru, Ollanta Humala, announced that Baca would become his Minister of Culture. On 28 July, she was sworn in, becoming the second Afro-Peruvian cabinet minister in the history of independent Peru. She resigned due to a cabinet reshuffle on 11 December 2011.

In November 2011, she was elected to the Organization of American States (OAS) as President of the Commission of Culture for the period 2011–13.

== Discography ==
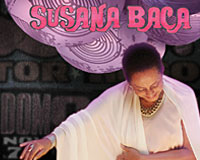
Afrodiaspora, 2011, album cover by Grimanesa Amorós.

Albums

- 1987 - Poesía y Canto Negro
- 1991 - Vestida de Vida, Canto Negro de las Américas! (Kardum, Iris)
- 1992 - Fuego y Agua (Elephant, Tonga)
- 1997 - Susana Baca (Luaka Bop)
- 2000 - Eco de Sombras (Luaka Bop)
- 2001 - Lamento Negro (Tumi Music)
- 2002 - Espíritu Vivo (Luaka Bop)
- 2002 - A Viva Voz (Empresa Editora El Comercio, compilation)
- 2004 - The Best of Susana Baca (Luaka Bop compilation)
- 2006 - Travesías (Luaka Bop)
- 2009 - Seis Poemas (Luaka Bop)
- 2010 - Mama (Editora Pregón)
- 2010 - Cantos de Adoración
- 2011 - Afrodiaspora (Luaka Bop)
- 2020 - A Capella: Grabado en Casa Durante la Cuarentena
- 2021 - Palabras Urgentes (Real World)
- 2025 – Conjuros (Pregón Producciones)

Contributing artist

- 1996 - The Rough Guide to the Music of the Andes (World Music Network)
- 2011 - Collaborated with Puerto Rican urban group Calle 13 on the song "Latinoamérica"
- 2013 - Sang "Gracias a la Vida" with Puerto Rican singer Chucho Avellanet in the Especial del Banco Popular: Música en Tiempos
- 2016 - Sang "Molino Molero" with Charlie Hunter and "Fuego y Agua" on Family Dinner – Volume 2 by Snarky Puppy

== Films ==
- 2003 - Susana Baca: Memoria Viva. Directed by Marc Dixon.
- 2013 - Sigo Siendo. Directed by Javier Corcuera.
- 2011 - Música afroperuana: tras la larga noche. Directed by Patricia Ferreira. Documentary made for TV. RTVE, series "Todo el mundo es música".

== See also ==
- List of Afro-Latinos
