= More Shine =

Studio album by Si*Sé
- Released: 27 September 2005
- Genre: Downtempo, electronic, Latin
- Label: Fuerte Records
- Producer: Cliff Cristofaro & Carol C.

Si*Sé chronology
Si*Sé (2001)	More Shine (2005)

Professional ratings
Review scores
Source	Rating
antiMUSIC	4/5 stars

More Shine is New York band Si*Sé's second album, released on 27 September 2005.

== Track listing ==
1. "Sometimes" - 4:53
2. "The Truth" - 3:54
3. "More Shine" - 5:26
4. "A la Bahia" - 1:39
5. "Amiga" - 4:20
6. "Agua" - 4:31
7. "Brazillion" - 1:47
8. "Changes" - 4:54
9. "Wanna Know" - 4:48
10. "Mariposa En Havana" - 4:36
11. "Karma" - 4:59
12. "Noche Azul" - 2:39
