= Everything Is Possible: The Best of Os Mutantes =

Everything Is Possible: the Best of Os Mutantes

Greatest hits album by Os Mutantes
- Released: 1999
- Recorded: 1968–1971
- Genre: Tropicalia, psychedelic rock
- Length: 49:18
- Label: Luaka Bop
- Compiler: David Byrne

Professional ratings
Review scores
Source	Rating
AllMusic	4.5/5 stars
Entertainment Weekly	A−
NME	4/5 stars
Pitchfork	8.9/10

Everything is Possible: The Best of Os Mutantes is a best of compilation by the Brazilian tropicalia band Os Mutantes. Compiled by David Byrne of Talking Heads, it was released by his world music record label Luaka Bop in 1999. Aimed towards an English-speaking market, its track selection differs much from other Mutantes compilations. It includes an abridged version of "Ando Meio Desligado."

== Track listing ==
No.	Title	Original album	Length
1.	"Ando Meio Desligado" (Arnaldo Baptista, Sérgio Dias & Rita Lee)	A Divina Comédia ou Ando Meio Desligado	3:03
2.	"Ave, Lúcifer" (Baptitsa and Lee)	A Divina Comédia ou Ando Meio Desligado	2:19
3.	"Dia 36" (Dandurand, Baptista, Lee & Dias)	Mutantes	4:02
4.	"Baby [1971]" (Caetano Veloso)	Jardim Elétrico	3:40
5.	"Fuga No. II" (Baptista, Lee & Dias)	Mutantes	3:41
6.	"Cantor de Mambo" (Baptista & Lee)	Mutantes E Seus Cometas No País Do Baurets	4:38
7.	"Adeus Maria Fulô" (Teixeira)	Os Mutantes	3:06
8.	"Desculpe, Babe" (Baptista & Lee)	A Divina Comédia ou Ando Meio Desligado	2:51
9.	"El Justiciero" (Baptista & Lee)	Jardim Elétrico	3:54
10.	"Panis et Circenses" (Gilberto Gil & Veloso)	Os Mutantes	3:38
11.	"A Minha Menina" (Jorge Ben)	Os Mutantes	4:41
12.	"Bat Macumba" (Gil & Veloso)	Os Mutantes	3:09
13.	"Le Premier Bonheur du Jour" (Gerald & Renard)	Os Mutantes	3:36
14.	"Baby [1968]" (Veloso)	Os Mutantes	3:00
