= Si*Sé =

American downtempo/electronic group

Si*Sé is a downtempo and electronic group from New York City. The main members of the band are Carol C (vocals, DJ) and Cliff Cristofaro (producer). Other members of the band include Ryan Farley (drums), Neil Ochoa (percussion) and Morgan Phillips (Bass). Jeannie Oliver was the viola player during the first two albums, but left the band in 2005. Olivia Martinez (viola) and Tarrah Reynolds (violin) have also played in place of Jeannie over the years. They rose to prominence in 2001, on a worldwide tour with David Byrne. They have also performed with Norah Jones, Kinky, Kraftwerk, Los Amigos Invisibles, Gotan Project, James Brown, Julieta Venegas, Cesária Évora, and Natacha Atlas.

== In popular culture ==
Their song "Steppin' Out" was featured in Kelly Slater's Pro Surfer. They composed "Si*Sé Melange", the music for designer Jillian Lewis for the season finale of Project Runway Season 4. Their song "The Truth" was featured in an episode of One Tree Hill and a CSI trailer. Their track "My Sol" was featured in an episode of Six Feet Under as well as on MTV's Road Rules. Lead singer Carol C's song "Cleopatra in New York" was featured in an episode of Sex and the City. Carol C's cover of Duran Duran's "Come Undone" was featured in an episode of NBC's Lipstick Jungle. Si*Sé was featured and performed their song "Amiga" live in an episode of VH1's Love Monkey.

== Discography ==
- Si*Sé (2001, Luaka Bop Records)
- More Shine (2005, Fuerte Records)
- Gold - EP (2010, Si*Sé Records)

=== Other contributions ===
- "Tributo a The Cure: Porque No Puedo Ser Tu" (1999, Warner) - "Just Like Heaven"
- Hear Music Volume 7: Waking (2002, Hear Music) - "Slip Away"
- Putumayo Presents: Sahara Lounge (2004, Putumayo Music) - "Cleopatra in New York"
- Hotel Costes (2007, Wagram) - "Cleopatra in New York"
- Soul Sessions (2002, Giant Step) - "Mariposa"
- Man Ray (2004, Milan) - "Mariposa"
- Putumayo Presents: Latin Lounge (2005, Putumayo Music) - "Mariposa en Havana"
- Hear Music: Songs of the Siren (2008, Hear Music) - "Sometimes"
