= Into the Oh =

Studio album by Geggy Tah
- Released: 2001
- Label: Luaka Bop/Virgin

Geggy Tah chronology
Sacred Cow (1996)	Into the Oh (2001)

Into the Oh is the third album by the American band Geggy Tah, released in 2001. It was the band's final album. Geggy Tah supported it by playing shows with labelmate Shuggie Otis.

== Production ==
Geggy Tah started work on the album in 1997; due to personal issues and label trouble, the album was delayed for four years. James Gadson played drums on three of the album's tracks. Laurie Anderson appears on "Aliens Somewhere," reading "a postcard from a strange cloud." The album was mixed by Michael Patterson.

== Critical reception ==
Professional ratings
Review scores
Source	Rating
AllMusic	4/5 stars
The Philadelphia Inquirer	3/4 stars
The Press of Atlantic City	3/4 stars
The Tampa Tribune	2/4 stars

The Philadelphia Inquirer called the album a collection of "silky smooth and gorgeously appointed meditations on love." The Boston Phoenix determined that "amiable hippie rock doesn’t get better than this." The Chattanooga Times Free Press noted that Into the Oh "employs contemplative, but odd lyrics, trippy melodies and unique instruments that create a surreal, multilayered effect."

The Toronto Sun praised "Holly Oak", likening it to a "nimble amalgam [that] sounds like nothing so much as Tim Buckley, or perhaps a very young Paul Simon, trying to play Steely Dan's 'Only a Fool Would Say That'." Steve Slosarek, of The Indianapolis Star, listed the album as the fifth best of 2001, praising the "soothing ... funk-jazz-experimental rock music." The Tampa Tribune concluded that the band "has largely dispensed with the power pop that peppered past efforts, and instead concentrates on creating dance grooves and throwing in odd instrumental choices." David Byrne stated that the album has "the most beautiful and unexpected songs" and that listening to it made him "personally envious."

The Orange County Register included Into the Oh on its list of the 10 best "overlooked" albums of 2001. The State considered it the 16th best album of 2001.

== Track listing ==
All songs written by Tommy Jordan & Greg Kurstin, except as noted.

1. "Goodnight to the Machine" (Granddaddy Giordano Jordan) – 0:57
2. "One Zero" (Tommy Jordan) – 3:10
3. "Dumb Submarine" (Tommy Jordan) – 3:54
4. "Sweat" – 4:36
5. "Holly Oak" (Tommy Jordan) – 3:00
6. "Space Heater" – 4:01
7. "Love Is Alone" – 4:44
8. "Special Someone" – 3:51
9. "I Forgot" (Tommy Jordan) – 4:05
10. "Aliens Somewhere" (Tommy Jordan) – 4:10
11. "I'll Find My Way" – 4:03
12. "Love Is in Love" (Tommy Jordan) – 4:13
