= Javelin (band) =

American electronic duo

- Origin: Providence, Rhode Island, United States
- Genres: Electronic, hip hop, R&B
- Years active: 2005–present
- Labels: Luaka Bop; Thrill Jockey; Dollar Bins Of The Future
- Members: Tom Van Buskirk; George Langford
- Website: dollarbinsofthefuture.com

Javelin is a production duo based in Brooklyn, New York City. Cousins George Langford and Tom Van Buskirk started making music together in Providence, RI in 2005, although their earliest tape experiments date back to childhood. Each member is a multi-instrumentalist. George plays the guitar, bass guitar, drums, and mandolin, while Tom plays the cello and piano. The duo has been described as "obsessed with old school hip-hop of an ‘80s vintage". While creating mostly mellow electro-pop/80s-synth style music, the band's music is very eclectic and they have even produced a country music album.

For years, Javelin used colorfully painted boomboxes on stage to color their sound like a guitar amp. The signal from the show was broadcast via FM transmitter, fostering audience participation (B.Y.O. Boombox) or fueling battery-powered, mobile parties. The band has played over 200 events including Lollapalooza in 2010.

In 2009 Javelin was identified a "Rising" artist by Pitchfork Media, tagged Best New Music Pitchfork's and was given honorable mention for Pitchfork's "Albums of the Year" for their breakout release JAMZ N JEMZ. Before forming Javelin, Langford regularly collaborated with the funk band Addison Groove Project.

== Discography ==
- Oh! Centra – 7 inch record – Lal Lal Lal (2006)
- Jamz n Jemz – Self-Released – (2008)
- Andean Ocean – Tape – Stenze Quo (2009)
- Javelin – 12 inch record – Thrill Jockey (2009)
- 2 – 12 inch record – Thrill Jockey (2010)
- No Más – CD, LP – Luaka Bop (2010)
- Canyon Candy – 10 inch vinyl Luaka Bop (2011)
- Hi Beams – Luaka Bop (2013)
