= Sinkane =

Sudanese-American musician

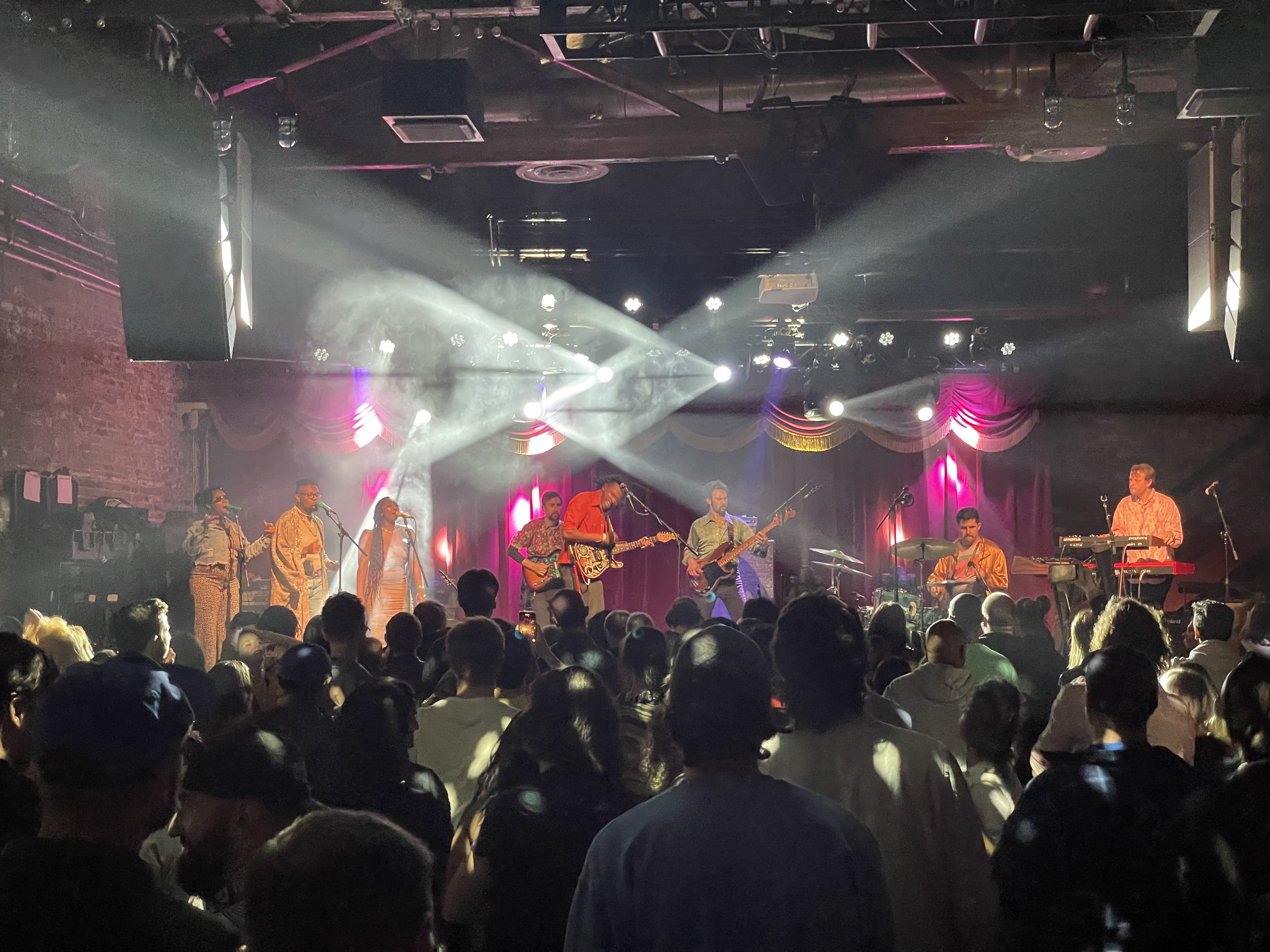
- Sinkane in 2022 at Brooklyn Bowl

Background information
- Also known as: Sinkane
- Born: Ahmed Abdullahi Gallab; London, England
- Origin: Omdurman, Sudan
- Genres: Rock, krautrock, trip hop, reggae fusion, worldbeat
- Occupations: Musician, music producer
- Instruments: Drums, guitar, bass, synthesizer, electronics
- Labels: City Slang, DFA, Emergency Umbrella
- Website: www.sinkane.com

Sinkane (born Ahmed Abdullahi Gallab c. 1983) is a Sudanese-American musician who blends krautrock, prog rock, electronica, free jazz and funk rock with Sudanese pop. He is signed to City Slang Records.

Born to college professors in London, he lived in Sudan, then moved to the US when he was five, and lived for some time in Provo, Utah, before moving to Kent, Ohio, in 8th grade and graduating from Theodore Roosevelt High School in Kent in 2002. He then moved to Columbus to attend The Ohio State University. Prior to embarking on his solo career, he worked with Eleanor Friedberger, Caribou, of Montreal, Born Ruffians, and Yeasayer as a session musician.

Ahmed Gallab is the vocalist and music director of the Atomic Bomb! Band which plays the music of Nigerian funk musician William Onyeabor. The group includes David Byrne (of Talking Heads), Money Mark (of the Beastie Boys), Damon Albarn (of Blur and Gorillaz), Dev Hynes (aka Blood Orange and Lightspeed Champion), Alexis Taylor (of Hot Chip), Charles Lloyd, Amadou and Mariam, Jamie Lidell, Pharoah Sanders, Joshua Redman, among many many others.

Gallab composed the music for the musical adaptation of Roald Dahl's book "The Enormous Crocodile". It debuted at Leeds Playhouse in Leeds, UK in December 2023 and made its London debut at Regent's Park Open Air Theatre on May 22, 2024. Gallab was nominated for Best Composer, Lyricist or Book Writer by the Stage Debut Awards for his work on this production.

On 10 February 2017 Sinkane released their sixth album Life & Livin' It on City Slang.

On 18 December 2008 Sinkane made their late-night television debut on David Letterman, playing drums with of Montreal. On 6 March 2017 they made their television network debut as a solo artist on Conan.

On 16 September 2019 Sinkane made their aquatic network debut on FishCenter Live.

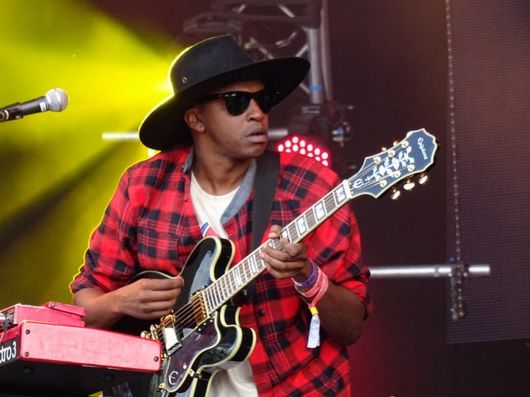
Sinkane, 2015

== Discography ==
- Sinisterals (2007)
- Color Voice (2008) (Emergency Umbrella)
- Sinkane (2009) (Emergency Umbrella)
- Mars (2012) (DFA, City Slang) Engineered and Mixed by Albert Di Fiore
- Mean Love (DFA, City Slang, 2014) Engineered and Mixed by Albert Di Fiore
- Life & Livin' It (City Slang, February 10, 2017)
- Dépaysé (City Slang, May 31, 2019)
- Gettin' Weird (Alive at Spacebomb Studios) (Spacebomb Records, Oct 25, 2019)
- We Belong (City Slang, April 5, 2024)
