= World Psychedelic Classics, Vol. 3: Love's a Real Thing =

Compilation album by Various Artists
- Released: March 8, 2005
- Genre: Afro-Beat, Soukous, Jùjú, Psychedelic
- Label: Luaka Bop; Stones Throw; V2
- Producer: David Byrne; Yale Evelev

Stones Throw Records chronology
The Third Unheard: Connecticut Hip Hop 1979-1983 Instrumentals (2004)	World Psychedelic Classics, Vol. 3: Love's a Real Thing (2005)	Stones Throw Records 2005 Sampler (2005)

Professional ratings
Review scores
Source	Rating
Allmusic	4/5 stars
Okayplayer.com	4.5/5 stars
Prefix Magazine	3/5 stars
Robert Christgau	A−

World Psychedelic Classics, Vol. 3: Love's a Real Thing is a compilation of West African music from the seventies. The album was released on compact disc by Luaka Bop Records while the vinyl record was released later by Stones Throw with a slightly different track listing which omitted two songs.

The album appeared at number 49 on the Pazz & Jop list of 2005.

== Track listing ==
=== CD ===
No.	Title	Artist	Length
1.	"Minsato Le, Mi Dayihome"	Orchestre Poly-Rythmo de Cotonou Dahomey	3:19
2.	"Love's a Real Thing"	Super Eagles	2:59
3.	"Keleya"	Moussa Doumbia	6:42
4.	"Ceddo End Title"	Manu Dibango	5:09
5.	"Porry"	Sorry Bamba	8:17
6.	"Guajira Van"	No. 1 De No. 1	5:12
7.	"Better Change Your Mind"	William Onyeabor	8:23
8.	"Allah Wakbarr"	Ofo & The Black Company	3:30
9.	"Awon-Ojise-Oluwa"	Gasper Lawal	6:23
10.	"Zinabu"	Bunzu Sounds	3:20
11.	"Ifa"	Tunji Oyelana & The Benders	4:59
12.	"Sanjina"	Orchestre Regional de Kayes	8:32

=== Vinyl ===
Side 1
No.	Title	Artist	Length
1.	"Minsato Le, Mi Dayihome"	Orchestre Poly-Rythmo de Cotonou Dahomey	3:19
2.	"Love's a Real Thing"	Super Eagles	2:59
3.	"Keleya"	Moussa Doumbia	6:42

Side 2
No.	Title	Artist	Length
4.	"Porry"	Sorry Bamba	8:17
5.	"Guajira Van"	No. 1 De No. 1	5:12

Side 3
No.	Title	Artist	Length
6.	"Better Change Your Mind"	William Onyeabor	8:23
7.	"Allah Wakbarr"	Ofo & The Black Company	3:30

Side 4
No.	Title	Artist	Length
8.	"Zinabu"	Bunzu Sounds	3:20
9.	"Ifa"	Oyelana, Tunji & The Blenders	4:59
10.	"Sanjina"	Orchestre Regional de Kayes	8:32
