= The Outsiders Are Back =

Studio album by Kings Go Forth
- Released: April 20, 2010
- Genre: Soul
- Length: 43:33
- Label: Luaka Bop
- Producer: Andy Noble; Dave Cusma

Professional ratings
Review scores
Source	Rating
Allmusic	3.5/5 stars
Spin	8/10 stars
Pitchfork	(7.8/10)
BBC Music	(?)

The Outsiders Are Back is the only full-length album by the Milwaukee, Wisconsin-based soul band Kings Go Forth. It was released in April 2010 on the Luaka Bop label. The album consists of ten original songs written by band members Andy Noble and Black Wolf. The album received positive reviews. The album's cover and title based on a fictional album cover designed by "imaginary soul superstar" Mingering Mike.

== Track listing ==
All songs written by Andy Noble and Black Wolf

1. One Day – 4:14
2. I Don't Love You No More – 4:20
3. You're the One – 4:08
4. Fight with Love – 3:40
5. High on Your Love – 4:15
6. Paradise Lost – 5:31
7. Don't Take My Shadow – 6:09
8. Now We're Gone – 4:02
9. 1000 Songs – 4:34
10. Get a Feeling – 2:38

== Personnel ==
=== Musicians ===
- Black Wolf - vocals
- Danny Fernandez - vocals
- Matt Norberg - vocals, guitar
- Dan Flynn - lead guitar
- Andy Noble - bass
- Dave Wake - keyboards
- Jeremy Kuzniar - drums
- Dave Cusma - trombone, trumpet
- Jed Groser - trumpet
- Cecilio Negron, Jr, - congas, percussion, background vocals
- Eric Jacobson - trumpet
- Aaron Gardner - flute, tenor saxophone

=== Production ===
- Andy Noble and Dave Cusma - producers
- Andy Noble - arranger
- Andy Noble and Jeremy Kuzniar - mixing
- Jeremy Kuzniar and Danny Zelonky - engineering
- Tom Moulton - mixing
- Glenn Meadows - mastering
