= Tuomas Rantanen =

Musician

Tuomas Rantanen (born 1 January 1972) from Tampere, Finland is a musician creating hard, monotonous and percussive techno music. Outside music, Tuomas Rantanen is specialized in the philosophy of Martin Heidegger.

== 12" discography ==
- Access Denied EP (Template Records)
- Kaotic EP (KK Traxx)
- Scapes (Definition Records)
- Alliance 1 (Audio Assault)
- Emergence Six (Emergence Records)
- Rocket Bay (Fak Records)
- Shamanalogue (KK Traxx)
- Disyllabic (Maracas Records)

== Compilation appearances discography ==
- Imaginary Fields Pt. 1 - Collection Of Short-Circuited Traxx (Oikosulku Records)
- Solid Players (12") (Definition Records)
- Solid Players Part II (12") (Definition Records)
- CTNERMX (by Club Telex Noise Ensemble vs various artists) (pHinnMilk Recordings)
- Components III EP (12") (Electracom Records)
- Remix Poison (12") (Definition Records)
- Element EP Part 2 (12") (Unknown Forces Records)
- Submissions 9 (12") (Submissions Records)

== Official link ==
- Tuomas Rantanen

== Unofficial links ==
- Tuomas Rantanen @ Discogs.Com
