= Rei Momo =

Studio album by David Byrne
- Released: October 3, 1989
- Genre: Latin; worldbeat
- Length: 63:37
- Label: Luaka Bop; Sire
- Producer: David Byrne; Steve Lillywhite

David Byrne chronology
The Last Emperor (1987)	Rei Momo (1989)	The Forest (1991)

Singles from Rei Momo
- 1. "Loco De Amor" Released: 1987; 2. "Make Believe Mambo" Released: 1989; 3. "Dirty Old Town" Released: 1989 (US and Spain); 4. "Independence Day" Released: 1990 (Europe and Spain)

Rei Momo is the debut solo studio album by the American musician David Byrne and his second overall studio album (after the 1981 collaborative album My Life in the Bush of Ghosts), released on October 3, 1989. The album reached number 54 on the UK Albums Chart and number 71 on the Billboard chart.

The album consists of diverse Latin music styles from Cuba (rumba, mozambique, mambo, chachachá, bolero), the Dominican Republic (merengue), Puerto Rico (bomba), Colombia (cumbia, mapeyé) and Brazil (samba, pagode). The album is mostly sung in English and features guest appearances by Kirsty MacColl, Willie Colón and Celia Cruz, among others.

== Release and promotion ==
The album was co-released by Luaka Bop and Sire on 3 October 1989. Three songs, "Loco de Amor", "Good and Evil", and "Office Cowboy" are excluded from the LP. All songs are present on the cassette and compact disc editions. David Byrne performed "Dirty Old Town" and "Loco de Amor" on Saturday Night Live's Thanksgiving show in 1989.

== Critical reception ==
Professional ratings
Review scores
Source	Rating
AllMusic	4.5/5 stars
Los Angeles Times	3.5 stars
New Musical Express	6/10
Rolling Stone	4/5 stars

The album was well-received by critics. In a retrospective review for The Guardian, Alexis Petridis wrote "Byrne’s first post–Talking-Heads solo album is a cut above [the multitude of late 80s pop albums dabbling in world music] and an underrated joy".

== Track listing ==
All tracks composed by David Byrne; except where indicated.

No.	Title	Writer(s)	Length
1.	"Independence Day" (feat. Kirsty MacColl)		5:45
2.	"Make Believe Mambo" (feat. Kirsty MacColl & Willie Colón)		5:23
3.	"The Call of the Wild"	Byrne, Johnny Pacheco	4:55
4.	"Dirty Old Town"		4:12
5.	"The Rose Tattoo"	Byrne, Willie Colón	3:50
6.	"Loco de Amor" (feat. Celia Cruz)	Byrne, Pacheco	3:51
7.	"The Dream Police" (feat. Kirsty MacColl)		3:00
8.	"Don't Want to Be Part of Your World" (feat. Kirsty MacColl)		4:55
9.	"Marching Through the Wilderness" (feat. Milton Cardona)	Byrne, Pacheco	4:30
10.	"Good and Evil"		4:35
11.	"Lie to Me" (feat. Kirsty MacColl)		3:40
12.	"Office Cowboy" (feat. Herbert Vianna)	Byrne, Arto Lindsay	3:40
13.	"Women vs Men"		4:06
14.	"Carnival Eyes" (feat. Milton Cardona)		4:04
15.	"I Know Sometimes a Man Is Wrong"		3:11

== Release history ==
Region	Date	Label	Format	Catalog
Worldwide	1989	Luaka Bop/Sire	CD	25990
Worldwide	1989	Luaka Bop/Sire	LP	25990
Worldwide	1989	Luaka Bop/Sire	Cassette tape	4-25990
Worldwide	1995	Luaka Bop/Sire	CD	7599-25990-2
