= Si*Sé (album) =

Studio album by Si*Sé
- Released: 21 October 2001
- Recorded: 2001
- Genre: Downtempo, electronica, Latin jazz
- Length: 54:06
- Label: Luaka Bop Records
- Producer: David Byrne

Si*Sé chronology
| Si*Sé (2001) | More Shine (2005) |

Professional ratings
Review scores
| Source | Rating |
|---|---|
| AllMusic | 3.5/5 stars |

Si*Sé is the self-titled debut album by Si*Sé.

== Track listing ==
1. "Slip Away" - 4:16
2. "The Rain (Where do I begin)" - 4:33 (Cover of "Rain" by Oran "Juice" Jones )
3. "My Sol" - 3:18
4. "Bizcocho Amargo" - 4:19
5. "Steppin' Out" - 3:20
6. "Burbuja" - 3:43
7. "Aire" - 6:13
8. "Beyond Outside" - 4:47
9. "Dolemite" - 5:33
10. "Cuando" - 4:30
11. "Sonrisa" - 4:40
12. "I Want You To..." - 6:03
13. "Lullaby" - 0:35

== Production notes ==
- Carol C.: Vocals & Lyrics
- U.F. Low: Keys & Programming
- Ryan Farley: Drums
- Morgan Phillips: Bass
- Jeannie Oliver: Strings
- Mike Tuosto, Mike Mangini and Zeb (The Spy from Cairo): Guitars
- Gordon "Nappy G" Clay: Percussion
- Produced by U.F. Low & Carol C
- Recorded by Mike Mangini & Mike Tuosto
- Engineered by Mike Mangini
- Illustrations by Kimou Meyer
