= Yoñlu =

Brazilian musician

- Yoñlu circa 2004 or 2006

Background information
- Born: Vinícius Gageiro Marques; September 1, 1989; Porto Alegre, Rio Grande do Sul, Brazil
- Died: July 26, 2006 (aged 16) Porto Alegre, Rio Grande do Sul, Brazil
- Genres: indie folk, lo-fi, experimental, MPB, electronic
- Occupations: Musician, singer-songwriter, photographer
- Instruments: Vocals, guitar, keyboards, percussion
- Years active: 2004–2006
- Labels: Luaka Bop, Allegro

Vinícius Gageiro Marques (September 1, 1989 – July 26, 2006), better known by his internet alias Yoñlu, was a Brazilian singer-songwriter noted for the posthumous release of his work after his suicide at the age of sixteen.

== Biography ==
=== Early life ===
Vinícius Gageiro Marques was born on September 1, 1989, in Porto Alegre, Rio Grande do Sul, Brazil, to Ana Maria Gageiro, a psychoanalyst and college professor, and Luiz Marques, also a college professor, and former Rio Grande do Sul Secretary of Culture. Marques' family moved to France when he was three, where he started learning French, but they moved back to Brazil when he was seven. He rapidly developed his English language skills through watching television, reading on the internet and listening to music. Sometime after, he taught himself to speak Welsh and to read Spanish. At age nine, Marques started therapy due to what his father called a "chemical imbalance".

Marques's musical interest was evident from an early age. At age 4, he experimented playing the drums for the first time, and soon after took up the piano and guitar.

=== Teenage years ===
During his teenage years, Marques was depressed and felt out of place at school and at home; he had a frequent presence on the Internet. At age 13, he started capturing his daily life via a camera. On July 26, 2004, he signed up for gaming forum RLLMUK, where he would eventually become a regular. He also made a blog via Blogspot, and over the course of his teenage years, he collaborated with others in music, photographic projects, and drawings, including a collaboration with Sabrepulse He expressed admiration for such musicians as MPB singer-songwriters Gilberto Gil and Caetano Veloso, and was shown to have been influenced by Toquinho and Antônio Carlos Jobim. Other influences included Leonard Cohen, John Frusciante, Neutral Milk Hotel, Grandaddy, and Gorky's Zygotic Mynci. He was an avid reader of Franz Kafka.

Marques was first shown to be suicidal in May 2006, when he posted on RLLMUK stating "Quick, someone say something really nice about my songs before I decide to KILL MYSELF." However, after the supporting response this post received, he decided to postpone his suicide; he frequently mentioned killing himself online and whilst sharing his songs with others up until his death.

At around this time, his mother found the lyrics to his song "Suicide" on his bed, and confronted him about it; she eventually found evidence of his suicidal ideation online and got him into therapy again. In therapy, Marques seemed to be improving.

== Death ==
On the afternoon on July 26, 2006, Marques told his parents that he would be having friends over for a barbecue, and had them leave the apartment for the day since he wanted to impress a girl. However, he had made plans to commit suicide through smoke inhalation by locking himself in his bathroom with two barbecue grills, and had posted on a forum asking for help killing himself. While some people in the thread pleaded him to stop, others gave him the advice he wanted; after Marques reported he couldn't stand the heat inside the bathroom, a retired firefighter told Marques what to do to make the suicide attempt more bearable. His last post was at 3:02 pm GMT-3.

A Canadian online friend of Marques's learned of the suicide attempt and called the Porto Alegre police, giving them Marques' address. Although the police and paramedics were able to enter the apartment and clear the smoke, Marques was pronounced dead by suicide via carbon monoxide poisoning at approximately 3:30 pm, after multiple attempts at resuscitation.

Marques left a CD-R with some of his music and a suicide note addressed to his parents, which cleared them from any responsibility over his death, and thanked them for their support.

== Legacy ==
After Marques' death, his father looked through his computer and found more of his recorded music. In 2008, the album Yoñlu was released in Brazil on the Allegro label. However, in 2009, Luaka Bop internationally released A Society in Which No Tear Is Shed Is Inconceivably Mediocre after former Talking Heads frontman David Byrne, the label's founder, took an interest in Yoñlu's story. The album was well-received by critics, although few reviewed it.

A film based on Marques' life, titled Yonlu, was released in 2017. It was directed by Brazilian director Hique Motanari and starred Thalles Cabral in the title role. The film was released in 2018.

== Discography ==
=== Albums ===
- Yoñlu (2008)
- A Society in Which No Tear is Shed is Inconceivably Mediocre (2009)
- You Know What It’s Like (2024)

=== EPs ===
- Three Inches of Music (2008)
- Deskjet (2023)
