= Waldemar Bastos =

Angolan musician (1954–2020)

- Birth name: Waldemar dos Santos Alonso de Almeida Bastos
- Born: January 4, 1954; São Salvador do Congo, Portuguese Angola
- Origin: Angola
- Died: August 10, 2020 (aged 66); Lisbon
- Genres: Fado, Afropop
- Occupation: Musician
- Instrument: Guitar
- Years active: 1982–2020

Waldemar dos Santos Alonso de Almeida Bastos (January 4, 1954 – August 10, 2020) was an Angolan musician who combined Afropop, Portuguese (fado), and Brazilian influences.

== History ==
He was born in the Portuguese Overseas Province of Angola's town of São Salvador do Congo (now M'banza-Kongo) from black parents who were both nurses. He started singing at a very early age using his father's instruments. After the independence of Angola in 1975 due to the events of the Carnation Revolution in Lisbon, at the age of 28 (in 1982) he fled the People's Republic of Angola for Portugal. He emigrated to Portugal in order to escape the civil war between the Marxist Popular Movement for the Liberation of Angola regime and the Western-backed National Union for Total Independence of Angola.

Waldemar Bastos died on August 9, 2020, in Lisbon, victim of cancer, at the age of 66, said a source from the communication office of the Ministry of Culture, Tourism and Environment of Angola.

== Discography ==
- Estamos Juntos (EMI Records Ltd., 1982)
- Angola Minha Namorada (EMI Portugal, 1989)
- Pitanga Madura (EMI Portugal, 1992)
- Pretaluz [blacklight] (Luaka Bop, 1997)
- Renascence (World Connection, 2004)
- Love Is Blindness (2008) (1 song on the compilation 'In The Name Of Love Africa Celebrates U2')
- Classics of my Soul (WB Music, 2010)
