= Atomic Bomb! Band =

Afrobeat and funk supergroup

- Genres: Funk, Afrobeat
- Years active: 2014–present
- Label: Luaka Bop
- Members: David Byrne; Alexis Taylor; Pat Mahoney; Lijadu Sisters; Joshua Redman; Money Mark; Ahmed Gallab; Jason Trammell; Ish Montgomery; Jonny Lam; Jas Walton

The Atomic Bomb! Band are a touring supergroup who play the music of Nigerian funk musician William Onyeabor. The core group is music director Ahmed Gallab and his band Sinkane (composed of Jason Trammell on drums, Ish Montgomery on bass and Jonny Lam on guitar), Alexis Taylor (of Hot Chip), Pat Mahoney (of LCD Soundsystem), Money Mark (of the Beastie Boys) Lekan Babalola and Jas Walton (of Antibalas).

== Style ==
William Onyeabor took the classical HighLife style of West Africa into a more electronic and individualised approach, merging it with the approach to music to be found in groups like Yes, Focus, Kraftwerk and Simple Minds, while retaining the aspects of style which informed early hip-hop and rap. To a great extent Atomic Bomb! returns the style to a more instrumental band-based approach, as the use of a huge backing choir and the combination of several bands using a wider range of instruments shows, although the more folk-ethnic approach of Hi-Life in the 1950s and 60s has largely disappeared.

The project has some similarities to other quasi-symphonic theme-based projects generally classified as Concept Album work in the 1970s, of the type more commonly associate with groups like Yes and Genesis, which were dismissed as excessive by the music industry in the mid 1970s. The work therefore bridges that gap and presents a new, or rather resuscitated, path forwards in an industry which is looking for direction.

== Featured guests ==
The group has also featured special guests including David Byrne (of Talking Heads), Damon Albarn (of Blur and Gorillaz), the Lijadu Sisters, Pharoah Sanders, Jamie Lidell, Joshua Redman, Kele Okereke (of Bloc Party), Luke Jenner (of The Rapture), Ghostpoet, Dev Hynes (aka Blood Orange / Lightspeed Champion), Wally DeBacker (Gotye), Young Fathers, Mahotella Queens, Andrew Ashong, Zap Mama, Charles Lloyd, Cheikh Lô, Peaking Lights, David Murray, Para One, Mike Floss, Moses Sumney, Sarah Jones, Green Gartside and Amadou and Mariam.

== First release ==
The band released their first recorded material with a limited six-track LP on Record Store Day, 22 April 2017.
