= No Más (album) =

Studio album by Javelin
- Released: April 6, 2010
- Genre: Experimental pop; chillwave
- Length: 43:49
- Label: Luaka Bop

Javelin chronology
2 (2010)	No Más (2010)	Canyon Candy (2011)

No Más is the debut studio album by American production duo Javelin, consisting of cousins George Langford and Tom Van Buskirk. It was released on April 6, 2010, by Luaka Bop.

== Development ==
Formed in 2005, Javelin had previously independently released a demo album, Jamz n Jemz, as well two limited 12-inches on the label Thrill Jockey, Javelin and Number Two. Having 100 tracks they had previously made for years, all varying in styles and how they were recorded, the challenge of making No Mas was in how the duo would choose what songs would be on the album, and how those songs would fit together on the record. Langford explained, "we were mainly just aiming to just occupy a sonic space that was sort of warm and inviting. An album is almost like an imagined space, it’s like where does this take place, where does this sound bring you? And so we basically just tried to make a cohesive album with those things in mind."

Keyboards, live percussion, guitars, bass guitars and drums were used in the making of No Mas. The duo studio-recorded real drums for a few cuts, and then added samples of an older drum kit from years ago into those recordings. They making that producing the songs are "basically like these tracks are like our children that we totally put out into the world ourselves", saying that only one song was mixed on the album. Scotty "Scotty Hard" Harding was credited on the release as handling the recording and mixing, and the duo enjoyed working with him in the studio, although at first they were a bit nervous, as they were dictators regarding how their songs would be re-adjusted.

== Composition ==
With the summer feel of Neon Indian's "Deadbeat Summer" and the overall presence of samplers, strings, drum machines, live drums, guitars, horns and homemade mbiras instrumentally, No Más is a MGMT-inspired experimental pop and chillwave album recreating the peak of every well-known genre, examples including chicago soul, psychedelic pop and 1970s instrumental film soundtracks. As Langford puts it, "I love making music that has flaws and human fingerprints all over it. There's also that grey area where you can't tell what's a sample, although it leaves you wanting to say, 'Hey, I did that!'" The sound was described by Pitchfork Media's Rob Mitchum as "Less turntablism, more an FM tuner shoulder-jostling between low-watt stations playing electro, funk, world music, and early hip-hop."

About one third of No Más is a revised version of Javelin's demo album Jamz n Jemz. The schoolyard funk song "Intervales Theme", with its arcade game sounds, doubles its length from its original demo counterpart and adds a smooth jazz piano, an artificial baritone sax, percussion and guitar to the mix that is on No Más. The previously instrumental Stephin Merritt-style "pitch-perfect pop" of "Mossy Woodland", was described by Allmusic's Rick Anderson as an odd case of synthesized children's vocals singing serious lyrics. The song, as well as the cinematic, psychedelic "Shadow Heart" that has soul claps, resonant drums and a Blue Beat Records-style Farfisa soul organ in its instrumentation, borrow Hal Blaine's drum intro that he did for the song "Be My Baby".

New material on No Más includes the low-weight electro-funk opener "Vibrationz", which, with its handclaps, vocal samples, house-influenced piano and analog synths, is similar to an old half-remembered summer hit. The "8-bit B-Boy hip-hop" song "Oh! Centra" involves a chipmunk voice rapping over Sonic The Hedgehog-style keyboards, a NES-like beat, a flute-driven melody and a sample of Salt-N-Pepa's "Push It", and was described by Marisa Brown of URB as Madlib's animated alter ego Quasimoto trying to do a 1980s' sex rap song. The twisted 1980s-style electro new wave disco track "On It On It" involves Buskirk doing a falsettoed Prince impression backed by shaking beats and twirling synth riffs. Flutes and skitty drums are on The Big Chill-esque easy listening song "We Ah Wi".

The Sharon Jones & The Dap-Kings-style "roller-rink disco" funk song "Tell Me What Will I Be?", borrows the sound of De La Soul's music released during their "D.A.I.S.Y. Age" and Jean-Jacques Perrey's work he made around the time Charles de Gaulle was president of France, with wobbly surf guitar strums, 1960s funk keys and a pounding beat included in its instrumentation. musicOMH writer Michael Cragg described it as a theme for a lost Blacksploitation movie. The synth disco song "Moscow 1980" (a cover version of a track by Finland's Kompleksi) has vocal harmonies in the style of The Beach Boys, and "The Merkin Jerk", a song similar to a 1970s montage sequence, has the goofiness of "Psyché Rock" by composers Pierre Henry and Michel Colombier. The glitch-hop funk track "Susie Cues" has a chopped-and-sliced piano. The cheesy Tipsy-influenced trip hop cut "C Town" is followed by what Alex Young of Consequence of Sound noted to be its vocalized counterpart, "Off My Mind". "Dep", an abstract R&B soul song, is followed by the closer "Goal/Wide", which has very shattered vocals, soft acoustic guitar and glockenspiel that the song the most mature on the entire release, as Anderson opined.

== Reception ==
Professional ratings
Aggregate scores
Source	Rating
Metacritic	76/100
Review scores
Source	Rating
Allmusic	4/5 stars
The A.V. Club	B+
The Boston Phoenix	2.5/4 stars
Drowned in Sound	7/10
Pitchfork Media	7.2/10
Popmatters	7/10 stars
Spin	2.5/5 stars
Tiny Mix Tapes	2.5/5 marks
URB	4/5 stars
XLR8R	8/10

No Más enjoyed positive reviews upon its release. The album received a weighted mean of 76 out of 100 from the aggregate on Metacritic based on 14 critical reviews, and on AnyDecentMusic?, it earned a 6.3 out of ten, also a weighted average. Erik Adams of The A.V. Club graded the record a B+, and assumed that it'll be most recalled for as "a treasure trove for future crate-diggers to pilfer." In his review for The Boston Phoenix, Carrie Battan called the album a series of fun, well-crafted chillwave tunes. In more mixed reviews, a Tiny Mix Tapes critic was dismissive towards No Más for being underdeveloped, disliking the record's alternations of songs that were on Javelin's previous demo release.

== Track listing ==
All tracks are written by George Langford and Tom Van Buskirk.

No.	Title	Length
1.	"Vibrationz"	3:08
2.	"Mossy Woodland"	1:52
3.	"Oh! Centra"	3:43
4.	"On It on It"	3:23
5.	"Intervales Theme"	3:38
6.	"We Ah Wi"	3:00
7.	"Tell Me What Will It Be?"	3:42
8.	"Moscow 1980"	3:04
9.	"The Merkin Jerk"	1:38
10.	"C Town"	3:22
11.	"Off My Mind"	3:02
12.	"Susie Cues"	1:54
13.	"Shadow Heart"	2:42
14.	"Dep"	4:21
15.	"Goal/Wide"	1:16
