= Cecilia Barraza =

- Born: Cecilia Augusta Barraza Hora; 5 November 1952 (age 73); Lima, Peru
- Genres: música criolla
- Occupation: Singer

Cecilia Augusta Barraza Hora (Lima, Peru, 5 November 1952) is a popular Peruvian singer of música criolla.

== Biography ==
Barraza was born into an artistic family. Her older brothers were Carlos Barraza, a lawyer and poet, and Miguel "Chato" Barraza, a well-known Peruvian comedian.

Her career as a vocal artist began in April 1971, after she appeared on the television program "Trampoline to Fame," where she was awarded a prize for the best cover song. In this contest, she covered a song by Alicia Maguiña, "Everything is telling me about you." Chabuca Granda was dazzled by her sweet voice and proposed bringing Barraza to Mexico to tour with the pop group Perú Negro. Barraza accepted, and thus began her path to becoming an important figure in Peruvian music.

== Discography ==
- Cecilia Barraza (1971)
- Cecilia Barraza Ahora
- Cecilia Barraza Vol. II
- Cecilia Barraza Vol. III (1977)
- Yo, Cecilia Barraza (1981)
- Alborotando (1997)
- Canta y Encanta (2000)
- Con Candela (2001)
