= Kings Go Forth (band) =

American soul band from Wisconsin

- Origin: Milwaukee, Wisconsin
- Genres: Soul
- Years active: 2007–2011
- Members: Andy Noble; Dan Flynn; Jeremy Kuzniar; Dave Cusma; Jed Groser; Dave Wake; Cecilio Negron, Jr. Danny Fernandez; Matt Norberg
- Past members: Black Wolf (deceased)

Kings Go Forth are a ten-piece American soul band from Milwaukee, Wisconsin. Their sound is rooted in 1970s soul, and the group employs production and recording techniques common in that era.

The group was founded by Andy Noble, the founder of the now defunct Milwaukee record store Lotus Land Records, in 2007. He then opened vinyl specialty shop We Buy Records in Milwaukee, WI (2018) and We Buy Records Chicago in Westchester, IL (2020).

The group's songs are written largely by Noble and vocalist Black Wolf. They released several 7" singles before signing to Luaka Bop; their debut full-length, The Outsiders Are Back, was released in 2010. Jesse "Black Wolf" Bilal died on May 21, 2023, in a house fire.

== Members ==
- Andy Noble (bass)
- Dan Flynn (guitar)
- Jeremy Kuzniar (drums)
- Dave Cusma (trombone)
- Jed Groser (trumpet)
- Dave Wake (keyboards)
- Cecilio Negron Jr. (percussion)
- Danny Fernandez (vocals)
- Matt Norberg (vocals)
- Black Wolf (vocals)
