= Bubu music =

Traditional style of music from Sierra Leone

Bubu music is traditional music played by the Temne people in Sierra Leone. The music was originally used in Temne animist ceremonies, but later it turned into a popular religious processional style played during Ramadan. In its folk form, the music is played by blowing on bamboo cane flutes and on metal pipes -often repurposed auto parts.

During the Sierra Leone Civil War, Ahmed Janka Nabay became the first musician to record Bubu music. He modernized the sound by adding electric studio instrumentation. With songs like "Sabanoh" (We Own Here), Nabay asserted what he established as the underlying message of Bubu—peace, good governance and the empowerment of women or "ponchus". Most of his music emphasized finding one’s inner soul or “squang”, and sharing love or “flampus en elangus bubu” - spreading the fire of your heart. According to an NPR interview aired on August 22, 2012, Nabay's music became popular across the war-torn nation in the 1990s, particularly among young rebels trying to overthrow the government, which forced Nabay to flee the country.

In 2010, Nabay released the first-ever international Bubu record, BUBU KING on True Panther Records in New York City. He subsequently formed the first-ever international Bubu band, Janka Nabay and the Bubu Gang, from local musicians in Brooklyn.

In 2018, Janka Nabay, the first musician to record Bubu Music, died.
