= Geggy Tah =

American alternative rock band

- Origin: Pomona, California, U.S.
- Genres: Alternative rock, experimental music
- Years active: 1994–2001
- Labels: Luaka Bop, Virgin
- Members: Greg Kurstin; Tommy Jordan; Daren Hahn
- Website: geggytah.com

Geggy Tah is a band initially composed of singer/bassist Tommy Jordan and keyboard/guitarist Greg Kurstin. The band was known for its eclectic and playful live shows that featured both Jordan and Kurstin playing a wide array of instruments. David Byrne said that "Geggy Tah are so postmodern they've come out the other side...They incorporate so many disparate elements into their sound that one senses a new sensibility afoot, an inclusionary wave...like nothing I've heard before."

== History ==
=== CoCu (late 1980s to early 1990s) ===
In about 1987, Jordan formed the ten-member band CoCu (short for Collaborating Cultures or Combating Cultures), a melding of several highly trained musicians, including Jordan, John McKnight, and Danny Moynahan, and five non-musicians. Kurstin auditioned and joined CoCu in 1988, introduced to Jordan by McKnight. CoCu was experimental and playful, described by Jordan as "more of a workshop than a band," with a focus on audience involvement, and quickly became a favorite in the Los Angeles club scene. CoCu ultimately established residencies at two exclusive Los Angeles clubs, Flaming Colossus and Vertigo, where they caught the attention of Steven Spielberg, who hired CoCu to play his birthday party, and U2's Bono, who bought CoCu three weeks of studio time and requested that Jordan send him the resulting recording. CoCu was also the inspiration for U2’s song “Tryin’ to Throw Your Arms Around the World” as their Flaming Colossus performances would sometimes feature Jordan playfully interacting with club goers while wearing long false arms.

=== Formation of Geggy Tah (1988) and signing with Luaka Bop (early 1990s) ===
Jordan and Kurstin began experimenting as a duo in mid-1988 and after CoCu disbanded in the early 1990s, their focus turned to this partnership. The name Geggy Tah was derived from their first names. Both men have a sister who was unable to pronounce her brother's name when very young; "Geggy" and "Tah", "Greg" and "Tommy." And Tommy's sister Amy Jordan sang vocals on all three records.

Their demo tape made its way into the hands of David Byrne who had in 1988 founded the record label Luaka Bop, intended to showcase music from outside the United States. Though Geggy Tah as an American band was not strictly in line with the profile of musicians Byrne intended to include on the label, he was so taken with their unique sound that he signed them, describing their demo tape as "one of the weirdest, most surprising things we'd ever heard. It was truly like nothing else." He elsewhere described Geggy Tah as "a cross between Ween and Prince, but with deeper and more articulate lyrics. To someone not in the business, I'd say it's the whole, very contemporary and un-nihilistic kit and kaboodle in one optimistic pot."

=== Grand Opening (1994) ===
Geggy Tah's first release, Grand Opening, was co-produced by Jordan and Kurstin with famed producer Susan Rogers, whose credits include Prince, The Jacksons, David Byrne, Barenaked Ladies, and Edie Brickell. Though Rogers typically produced higher profile musicians, she like Byrne was so taken with Geggy Tah's demo tape that she accepted a much lower fee in order to work with them, stating that the experience changed her life and boosted her career by teaching her to think differently about what music was and could be.

Though not a commercial success, Grand Opening was a hit with music critics and scholars. Rolling Stone’s review of Grand Opening stated that “The duo’s classical and jazz backgrounds prop up songs whose structural inventiveness rewards saturation listening after the first delightful surprise…a debut that creates its own aural planet. Positively surreal." Billboard music critic Timothy White was similarly effusive: "...the beguiling music is wiser than the accumulation of its quasi-whimsical ingredients. The material gleams with a wacky-brilliant tenderness, appreciative of the subtle human tension between observation and impulse. And no matter how haphazard they might seem, each of the 15 tracks on Grand Opening has a sleek, pointy groove, hitching the melody to one's psyche with the keen handiness of a hat pin...Grand Opening...defies every structural statute in the rock bylaws, doling out precise harmonies, static-stuttered atonal bleats, old-school hip-hop time signatures and square-dancing breakdowns, plus jazz-pop bouquets of soda bottle trumpets, dulcimers, steel drums, pounded tabletops, and non-sequitur background discussions."

=== Sacred Cow (1996) ===
For their 1996 release Sacred Cow, Geggy Tah added drummer Daren Hahn to the lineup. Also on Luaka Bop, the album spawned the hit single "Whoever You Are" which peaked at #16 on the Billboard Modern Rock Tracks chart (the song would also appear in a Mercedes-Benz commercial circa 2001). The tune and refrain of "Whoever You Are" had been written by Jordan as a child, as a way of thanking thoughtful drivers and cheering up his father, who would sometimes become irate in traffic. The track's hit music video featured Jordan, Kurstin, and Hahn playing the song while driving, their antics playfully woven into scenes from an old driving safety film.

=== Into the Oh (2001) ===
In 1999, the band announced a new album entitled Music Inspired by the Fragrance, and released two songs ("Space Heater" and "Sweat") on the web in mp3 format. However, in part because of Luaka Bop's move from Warner Bros. to Virgin Records, the album went unreleased until 2001, by which point it had acquired a new title: Into the Oh. Into the Oh was released on Luaka Bop / Virgin with new band members including Los Angeles session percussionist and composer "Lavey" Bruce Millstein.

In 2000, Tommy Jordan played the steel drums track for Jack Johnson's song "Flake" on Brushfire Fairytales. Ben Harper has called Jordan "one of the most creative and versatile multi-instrumentalists of our generation." In the 1990s, T Bone Burnett said that Jordan was one of the five most creative people working in the music business.

In 2006, Kurstin formed a new band, The Bird and the Bee. In 2010, Kurstin was nominated for a Grammy Award in the Best Producer, Non-Classical division for his work on Lily Allen's It's Not Me, It's You.

== Discography ==
=== Albums ===
- Grand Opening (1994, Luaka Bop)
- Sacred Cow (1996, Luaka Bop)
- Into the Oh (2001, Luaka Bop/Virgin)

=== Singles ===
List of singles, with selected chart positions
Title	Year	Peak chart positions		Album
Title	Year	AUS	US Alt	Album
"Whoever You Are"	1996	63	67	Sacred Cow
