= Yale Evelev =

Company president

Yale Evelev is the president of Luaka Bop Records. A 2013 article at NPR.org described Evelev as someone who "digs up information about great-but-forgotten musicians for a living."

He was raised in Philadelphia, and attended the School of the Museum of Fine Arts in Boston. In the 1970s he worked at Soho Music Gallery in New York, and in 1980 took a job as promotions director at the New Music Distribution Service, which specialized in independent music releases. He later went to work for the Brooklyn Academy of Music, where he served as Director of their New Music America series from 1988 to 1990. Among the performers he booked was Talking Heads frontman David Byrne, with whom he became friends.

In 1988 Byrne founded Luaka Bop, and in 1990 hired Evelev to run the label. Under Evelev, Luaka Bop has been in the forefront of issuing new and overlooked vintage African music, indigenous Latin music, and other World musics. About issuing these artistic discoveries on his US-based label, Evelev said in a 2011 interview, "This happens a lot, when people who don't value their culture suddenly see it being appreciated outside and say, 'Hey, people are paying for this, maybe we ought to take a closer look.'"

Evelev has produced albums by John Zorn, Scott Johnson, Malombo, Tom Zé, Geggy Tah, Daniel Lentz, Shuggie Otis, Zap Mama, William Onyeabor, and others. He has produced albums for the labels Icon (which he founded), Nonesuch, Luaka Bop, Aoede, Warner Bros., and Manteca.
