= Ahmed Janka Nabay =

Sierra Leonean musician (1964–2018)

- Born: January 5, 1964; Sierra Leone
- Died: April 2, 2018 (aged 54)
- Occupation: Musician

Ahmed Janka Nabay (5 January 1964 – 2 April 2018) was a Sierra Leonean musician and a major figure in Bubu Music, a traditionally Temne music which is played by up to 20 musicians blowing into bamboo pipes of different sizes. He first earned attention after performing for an audition of SuperSound.

He recorded his album in Forensic Studios in Freetown during the Sierra Leonean Civil War. Since moving to Washington, D.C. in 2003, he continued to play bubu music, including a performance at the CMJ College Music Marathon in New York in 2009 and 2010.

In June 2010, he formed a full band, Janka Nabay and the Bubu Gang, with members of four Brooklyn indie rock groups Skeletons, Gang Gang Dance, and Starring.

In 2012, his band announced that they had signed a three-album record deal with David Byrne's record label, Luaka Bop.

== Personal life and death ==
Janka Nabay was of Mandingo and Temne descent, two of the ethnic groups within Sierra Leone.

It was reported on April 2, 2018 that Janka Nabay had died of a stomach ailment. He was 54 years old.

Nabay's bandmate Michael Gallope wrote about the band's creative process and Nabay's "often dehumanizing" experiences as an exile attempting to make a living out of music.

== Discography ==
Disarm, Recorded at Island Studio Freetown, Side A: 1) Dis-Arm, 2) Dance to the Bu-Bu 3) Lek You Culture 4) Some Body. Side B: 1) Yay Su Tan Tan, 2) On the Bu-Bu 3) Dance to the Bu-Bu, 4) Dis-Arm
Bubu King, True Panther Sounds, 2010.
An Letah, True Panther Sounds/Luaka Bop, 2012.
En Yay Sah, Luaka Bop, 2012
Build Music, Luaka Bop, 2017
