= Lal Lal Lal =

Finnish record label

Lal Lal Lal is a Finnish record label run by Roope Eronen, Arttu Partinen and Kevin Regan, specialized in psychedelic folk and similar genres, and has gained a cult reputation around the world. The Wire magazine has given their releases favourable reviews.

== Discography ==
1. Avarus: Possum Ekor Kait Dataran
2. Avarus: Horuksen keskimmäisen silmän mysteerikoulu
3. Kemialliset Ystävät: Varisevien tanssi / Silmujen marssi
4. Neil Campbell: Sol Powr
5. Sipriina: Pianon äärellä
6. V/A: Kuolleena haudattuja
7. The Anaksimandros: Camels running through life
8. Toni Laakso
9. Munuaissymposium 1960 / Maniacs Dream
10. Kukkiva Poliisi / Avarus: Maximum Highway Lifestyle
11. keijo
12. Master Qsh
13. Maniacs Dream
14. Rauhan Orkesteri
15. The Demars: Veriläiskiä
16. Avarus: Kimi on Tintti
17. Avarus: Jättiläisrotta
18. Hall of Fame: Cannibal / Superstring Theory
19. Kompleksi: (I Ain't No) Lovechild / Moscow 1980
20. Paavi
21. Fricara Pacchu: Waydom
22. MWM / Maryfist
23. The Skaters: Crowned Purple Gowns
24. Buffle : Constrictor
25. The Ray Pacino Ensemble : Be My Lonely Night
26. Armas Huutamo: Aurinko on kaunis Asia
27. Javelin: Oh Centra. Album art by Joe Grillo of the art collective Dearraindrop
28. Avarus: Vesikansi
29. Fricara Pacchu: Space Puppet
30. Maniacs Dream: Zanzibar
31. Renegade Scanners: Hands on Future
32. The Ray Pacino Ensemble: Be My Lonely Night / Golden Greats
33. Nuslux
34. V/A: Lal Lal Lal Festival
35. Semimuumio : Vamos
36. Maniacs Dream : Turku Hold'Em
37. Howlin' Magic : The Dreaming
38. Fricara Pacchu : Midnight pyre
39. V/A: Feeling strong!
40. V/A: Lal Lal Lal Festival 2
41. Good Band
42. Puke Eaters : Hello Valhalla
43. V/A : Lal Lal Lal Festival 3
44. V/A : Lal Lal Lal Festival 4
45. Avarus : Live
46. V/A : Tour tape 2011
