= PHinn =

Finnish musician

pHinn (a.k.a. Erkki Rautio) of Tampere, Finland is the founder and Webmaster of pHinnWeb, a WWW site dedicated to Finnish electronic music, techno music, avantgarde, experimental music, rave culture and underground culture. pHinn also works as a DJ, occasionally as a freelance writer, is an outsider artist creating surrealism/pop art-influenced collage art, and is alongside Mike Not the member of electro music act Kompleksi where he sings, writes lyrics and music. pHinn's earlier musical project was Club Telex Noise Ensemble in 2001.

pHinn has been one of the founder members and organisers of Tampere's Club Telex (with Mikko "mini" Niemelä of Polytron) and Eclectro Lounge (with Mike Not) nights for electro music and other electronic sounds. He has also a run a small CD-R label called pHinnMilk Recordings (2001-). In 1999 German De:Bug techno magazine featured pHinn in its "E-Mail Legends" series. The City magazine of Tampere chose pHinn in 2001 as "The Best Underground Man of Tampere" and in 2007 Aamulehti chose pHinn as "The Best DJ of Tampere".

pHinn has also written and co-directed, with musician Janne Perttula (Heroin and Your Veins, UltraNoir), a film noir-inspired short movie called Kirje ("The Letter", 2015).

== pHinnWeb ==
pHinnWeb is a Finnish website that was started in April 1996 by pHinn. Its purpose is to spread information on electronic music, techno music, avantgarde, experimental music and independent music in Finland; of artists, record labels, clubs and so on. The peculiar spelling of pHinnWeb's name is a reference to acid house culture where "f" was often spelled as "ph" or "pH". pHinnWeb is also concerned with underground culture and arts in Finland and around the world. Among some of the non-Finnish artists featured at pHinnWeb one might mention, for example, Chicks on Speed and Jonathan Saul Kane. As part of its activities, pHinnWeb runs an English-language electronic mailing list on Yahoo! Groups.

== pHinnMilk Recordings ==
pHinnMilk Recordings, a small record label publishing CD-Rs, was founded in 2001 in Tampere, Finland as the publishing outlet of pHinnWeb.

=== Discography ===
- Club Telex Noise Ensemble: Just To Disturb You A Little Bit CD-R (phnnmlk-0, June 2001)
- Virtalähde: Virka- ja väkivalta CD-R (phnnmlk-1, March 2002)
- Kohinatuotanto (a.k.a. Noise Production): Äänikemia CD-R (phnnmlk-2, May 2002)
- Club Telex Noise Ensemble vs various artists: CTNERMX CD-R (phnnmlk-3, March 2003)
- Unidentified Sound Objects: Richard D. Anderson Album CD-R (phnnmlk-4, January 2005)
- Kompleksi: Sister Longlegs Dances In The Disco digital download (phnnmlk-5, August 2007)

=== Filmography ===
- Kirje. A short film, co-directed with Janne Perttula (February 2015)

== Official links ==
- pHinnWeb
- pHinnMilk Recordings
