= William Onyeabor =

Nigerian funk musician (1946–2017)

Background information
- Born: 26 March 1946
- Origin: Enugu, Nigeria
- Died: 16 January 2017 (aged 70)
- Genres: Afro-funk; electro-funk; psychedelic funk; reggae; disco
- Occupation: Singer-songwriter
- Instruments: Vocals; synthesizer
- Years active: 1977–1985
- Labels: Wilfilms; Luaka Bop
- Website: williamonyeabor.com

William Ezechukwu Onyeabor // (/ɒnˈjɑːbɔː/, on-YAH-baw; 26 March 1946 – 16 January 2017) was a Nigerian funk musician and businessman. His music was widely heard in Nigeria in the late 1970s and early 1980s. Despite his success, he remained an enigmatic, private, and reclusive figure.

== Overview ==
Onyeabor's songs are often heavily rhythmic and synthesized, occasionally epic in scope, with lyrics decrying war. Onyeabor himself and female backing singers provided vocals. In the 2010s, some of his songs appeared on various compilations, most frequently his biggest hit, "Better Change Your Mind", which appeared on Africa 100, World Psychedelic Classics 3: Love's a Real Thing – The Funky Fuzzy Sounds of West Africa on Luaka Bop, and Nigeria 70: The Definitive Story of 1970's Funky Lagos on Strut Records.

== Biography ==
Onyeabor was born into a poor family, but became financially successful enough to travel to Europe to study record manufacturing. Some biographies claim that he studied cinematography in Russia, returning to Nigeria in the 1970s to start his own Wilfilms music label and to set up a recording and production studio. He was later crowned a High Chief in Enugu, where he lived as a businessman working on government contracts and running his own semolina flour mill. His business successes saw him named West African Industrialist of the Year in 1987.

According to the Luaka Bop record label, Onyeabor "self-released eight albums between 1977 and 1985 and then became a born-again Christian, refusing to ever speak about himself or his music again." The label reported that through attempting to speak with Onyeabor himself, and by talking to people who seem to have firsthand knowledge, it tried to construct an accurate biography of him for 18 months, without success.

In 2014, the music website Noisey, affiliated to Vice magazine, released a 31-minute documentary entitled Fantastic Man that documents Onyeabor's history and legacy as well as Noisey's attempt to track him down for an interview. 2014 also saw a touring supergroup called the Atomic Bomb! Band come together to play Onyeabor's music at a series of concerts and festivals around the world. The group is led by musical director Ahmed Gallab and his band Sinkane and includes David Byrne, Money Mark, Damon Albarn, Pat Mahoney, Dev Hynes, Alexis Taylor, Charles Lloyd and Amadou and Mariam. Other admirers of Onyeabor's work include Dan Snaith, Four Tet and Tune-Yards. His song "Fantastic Man" was featured in a television commercial for Apple's iPhone 7 Plus in 2017, as well as in a 2023 commercial for H&M, and a 2025 Casamigos commercial. In December 2014, Onyeabor made his debut radio broadcast on the Lauren Laverne Show on BBC 6 Music, where he stated "I only create music that will help the world," and announced that he had plans to release new material.

Onyeabor had four children. One of his children, Charles Onyeabor, is also a musician.

Following a brief illness, on 16 January 2017 Onyeabor died at his home in Enugu, Ezechukwu Palace. He was buried nearby on 26 May.

== Discography ==
- Crashes in Love (1977)
- Atomic Bomb (1978)
- Tomorrow (1979)
- Body & Soul (1980)
- Great Lover (1981)
- Hypertension (1982)
- Crashes in Love – Version 2 (1982)
- Good Name (1983)
- Anything You Sow (1985)
- Who is William Onyeabor? (compilation) (2013)
- What?! (Covers and remixes) (2014)
