= Luaka Bop =

American record label

- Founded: 1988
- Founder: David Byrne
- Distributor: Warner Bros. Records (1988–2000); Narada/Virgin/EMI Records (2000–2005); V2/BMG Records (2005–2006); The Orchard/!K7 (2006–present); Self (2006–present)
- Genre: Rock, pop, jazz, bubu, soul, funk, folk, psychedelic, world music
- Country of origin: United States
- Location: New York City
- Official website: luakabop.com

Luaka Bop is a New York–based record label founded by musician David Byrne, former lead singer and guitarist for the art rock–new wave band Talking Heads. What began with Byrne making cassettes of his favorite Tropicália tracks for his friends became a full-fledged record label in 1988 after Byrne received a solo artist deal from Warner Bros.

Since then, Luaka Bop has developed into a label known for bringing eclectic music to new audiences. Though initially affiliated with Warner Bros, Luaka Bop has been wholly independent since 2006. Often categorized as a “world music” label, Luaka Bop considers its own music to be mostly contemporary pop.

Luaka Bop has released full-length albums, EPs, and singles from artists such as Alice Coltrane, Tom Zé, William Onyeabor, Tim Maia, and Floating Points, as well as compilations covering a wide range of musical movements and styles. The label's maiden release eventually became the seven-album Brazil Classics series, which surveys genres from samba to Tropicália, as well as individual artists. This was the first of a number of region- or genre-specific compilation series released by Luaka Bop.

Luaka Bop's releases have frequently been well received by critics, with both compilations and releases of individual artists regularly featuring in best-of-year lists. The label has been highlighted for its “singular ability to (re)discover, celebrate, and legitimize the otherwise low-profile work of some of the world’s more eccentric musical figures.”

== Name and logo ==
Byrne took the phrase "Luaka Bop" from the inner packaging of a specialty tea which is sold in England. Luaka is the name of a tea importer. Their "Broken Orange Pekoe" is packaged in a silver foil block; when the sleeve is removed, it reveals a white label that reads "Luaka BOP". Byrne found the phrase to be “strange, but musical”, a combination he liked.

The Luaka Bop logo design was conceived by David Byrne and illustrated by Tibor Kalman. According to Byrne:

The logo, whose use is granted through an agreement that is subject to certain conditions, is a rather obscure Masonic symbol linked at various times to the Trinity of the Illuminati and to the Egyptian Knights of Templar. … The eye of the Luaka Bop logo is the eye of Vilaç Trismegistes, the Balkan alchemist who gave his eyes to his work, and who was the first to uncover the secrets of the Egyptian Knights.

== Musical philosophy ==
While often described as a “world music” label, Luaka Bop has no explicit musical focus. Asked about the original concept for the label, Byrne says “the initial concept was no concept”, going on to say “I’ve never had an artistic plan with this label—there are no guidelines as far as what we’re going to do or what kind of music it might be”.

In fact, the label has often tried to avoid the “world music” moniker and the changed perceptions that come with it. On Luaka Bop's website, Byrne details this tension through the example of Zap Mama, who debuted on Luaka Bop as part of the Adventures in Afropea series:

Overall, we think of the music we work with as contemporary pop music, and we try to present it as such. While something like Zap Mama’s first record could be, and sometimes was, perceived as an ‘ethnic’ record, we did our damnedest to alter that perception. The CD covers go a long way, in my opinion, to creating this attitude. We don’t do covers that look like folkloric records or like academic records of obscure material of interest only to musicologists and a few weird fringe types… we work with the designers to come up with a graphic statement that says ‘this music is as relevant to your life and is as contemporary as Prodigy, Fiona Apple, or Cornershop.’ … So gradually, although Zap Mama might have initially been thought of as an ‘ethnic-folkloric’ ensemble, they are now thought of just as a cool group.

Tibor Kalman designed the first two Brazil Classics albums, and several other designers from Kalman's M&Co. design firm have provided the label with distinctive album art.

== Compilation series ==
=== Brazil Classics ===
The Brazil Classics series began with Luaka Bop's first-ever release, and has garnered both critical acclaim and commercial success. The series has grown to consist of the following records:

- Brazil Classics 1: Beleza Tropical (1989)
- Brazil Classics 2: O Samba (1989)
- Brazil Classics 3: Forro etc.: Music of the Brazilian Northeast (1991)
- Brazil Classics 4: The Best of Tom Zé (1990)
- Brazil Classics 5: The Return of Tom Zé: The Hips of Tradition (1992)
- Brazil Classics 6: Beleza Tropical 2: Novo! Mais! Melhor! (1998)
- Brazil Classics 7: In Pernambuco: New Sounds of the Brazilian Northeast (2008)

Luaka Bop has also released music by Brazilian artists outside of the Brazil Classics series, such as Tim Maia, Os Mutantes and Moreno Veloso.

=== Cuba Classics ===
- Cuba Classics 1: The Best of Silvio Rodriguez (1991)
- Cuba Classics 2: Dancing with the Enemy (1991)
- ¡Cuba Classics 3: Diablo al Infierno! (1992)

=== Asia Classics ===
- Asia Classics 1: The South Indian Film Music of Vijaya Anand: Dance Raja Dance (1992)
- Asia Classics 2: The Best of Shoukichi Kina: Peppermint Tea House (1994)

=== Adventures in Afropea ===
The Adventures in Afropea series signaled a slight shift, as the music here is grouped by a broad stylistic criterion (a fusion of African and European influences) as opposed to a purely geographic one.

- Adventures in Afropea 1: Zap Mama (1993)
- Adventures in Afropea 2: The Best of Djur Djura: Voice of Silence (1993)
- Adventures in Afropea 3: Telling Stories to the Sea (1995)

=== Afro-Peruvian Classics ===
The Afro-Peruvian Classics series continued the label's shift towards more stylistically specific compilation albums, focusing on a single subgroup of Peruvian music.

- Afro-Peruvian Classics 1: The Soul of Black Peru (1995)

While the series still has only one entry, that record saw Luaka Bop begin its work with Susana Baca, who has since released six albums with the label.

=== World Psychedelic Classics ===
The World Psychedelic Classics series was the first from Luaka Bop to have no geographic aspect to it. The five entries in the series span decades and continents.

- World Psychedelic Classics 1: Everything Is Possible: The Best of Os Mutantes (1999)
- World Psychedelic Classics 2: California Soul: Inspiration Information (2001) (rework and reissue of Shuggie Otis’ 1974 album)
- World Psychedelic Classics 3: Love's a Real Thing: The Funky Fuzzy Sounds of West Africa (2004)
- World Psychedelic Classics 4: Nobody Can Live Forever: The Existential Soul of Tim Maia (2012)
- World Psychedelic Classics 5: Who Is William Onyeabor? (2013)

World Psychedelic Classics 3 helped “inspire an industrious coterie of crate diggers and lead to an explosion of ‘70s funk from Nigeria and Ghana”, with other labels crediting it with influencing the look and sound of their later releases. It also featured the song “Better Change Your Mind” by William Onyeabor, which eventually led to the release of World Psychedelic Classics 5: Who Is William Onyeabor?

The popularity of Onyeabor's music in these compilations led to an eventual Luaka Bop reissue of Onyeabor's entire discography and the formation of the Atomic Bomb! Band, a “supergroup” dedicated to performing his music live. This was the first time Onyeabor's music was played live, as he never performed himself.

=== World Spirituality Classics ===
- World Spirituality Classics 1: The Ecstatic Music of Alice Coltrane Turiyasangitananda (2017)
- World Spirituality Classics 2: The Time for Peace Is Now: Gospel Music About Us (2019)
- World Spirituality Classics 3: The Muslim Highlife of Alhaji Waziri Oshomah (2022)

== Artists ==
Notable artists who have had individual releases on the label include:

- The +2s
- Alice Coltrane
- AR Kane
- Bloque
- Bremer/McCoy
- Bright Moments
- Clinton
- Cornershop
- David Byrne
- Delicate Steve
- Djur Djura
- Domenico Lancellotti
- Doug Hream Blunt
- Floating Points
- Geggy Tah
- Janka Nabay and the Bubu Gang
- Javelin
- Jim White
- John Panduranga Henderson
- Kassin
- King Changó
- Kings Go Forth
- Leenalchi
- Los Amigos Invisibles
- Los de Abajo
- Márcio Local
- Mimi Goese
- Moreno Veloso
- Nouvelle Vague
- Os Mutantes
- Paulo Bragança
- Pharoah Sanders
- Preacherman
- Shoukichi Kina
- Shuggie Otis
- Si*Sé
- Silvio Rodríguez
- Susana Baca
- The Terror Pigeon Dance Revolt!
- Tim Maia
- Tom Zé
- Vijaya Anand
- Waldemar Bastos
- William Onyeabor
- Yoñlu
- Zap Mama

== Discography ==
Artist	Title	Year
David Byrne	Rei Momo	1989
Various Artists	Brazil Classics 1: Beleza Tropical	1989
Various Artists	Brazil Classics 2: O Samba	1989
Tom Zé	Brazil Classics, Vol. 4: The Best of Tom Zé – Massive Hits	1990
Various Artists	Brazil Classics 3: Forro etc.: Music of the Brazilian Northeast	1991
Silvio Rodríguez	Cuba Classics 1: The Best of Silvio Rodríguez	1991
Various Artists	Cuba Classics 2: Dancing With the Enemy	1991
Various Artists	To Scratch That Itch - A Luaka Bop Compilation	1991
David Byrne	The Forest	1991
David Byrne	Uh-Oh	1992
A.R. Kane	Americana	1992
Vijaya Anand	Asia Classics 1: The South Indian Film Music of Viajaya Anand: Dance Raja Dance	1992
Various Artists	Asia Classics: Dancing is Beautiful (Remixes of tracks from "Asia Classics 1")	1992
Various Artists	Cuba Classics 3: Diablo al Infierno	1992
Tom Zé	Brazil Classics, Vol. 5: The Hips of Tradition	1992
Balanescu Quartet	Balanescu Quartet Play Byrne/Moran/Lurie/Torke	1992
Zap Mama	Adventures in Afropea 1	1993
Djur Djura	Adventures in Afropea 2: The Best of Djur Djura: Voice of Silence	1993
Shoukichi Kina	Asia Classics 2: The Best of Shoukichi Kina: Peppermint Tea House	1994
Zapa Mama	Sabsylma	1994
David Byrne	David Byrne	1994
Geggy Tah	Grand Opening	1994
A.R. Kane	New Clear Child	1994
Various Artists	Afro-Peruvian Classics: The Soul of Black Peru	1995
Various Artists	Blue In The Face - Music From The Miramax Motion Picture	1995
Cornershop	Woman's Gotta Have It	1995
Cornershop	W.O.G. – The U.S Western Oriental mixes	1995
Various Artists	Adventures in Afropea 3: Telling Stories to the Sea	1995
King Changó	King Changó	1995
Geggy Tah	Sacred Cow	1996
Paulo Bragança	Amai	1996
Jim White	Wrong-Eyed Jesus	1996
Zap Mama	Seven	1997
David Byrne	Feelings	1997
Susana Baca	Susana Baca	1997
Cornershop	When I Was Born for the 7th Time	1997
Waldemar Bastos	Pretaluz	1998
Los Amigos Invisibles	The New Sound of the Venezuelan Gozadera	1998
Mimi Goese	Soak	1998
Los de Abajo	Los de Abajo	1998
Bloque	Bloque	1998
Various Artists	Beleza Tropical 2: Novo! Mais! Melhor! (Brazil Classics 6)	1998
Tom Zé	Fabrication Defect	1998
Tom Zé	Postmodern Platos (EP)	1999
Os Mutantes	World Psychedelic Classics 1: Everything is Possible: The Best of Os Mutantes	1999
Zap Mama	A Ma Zone	1999
King Changó	Return of El Santo	2000
Various Artists	Luaka Bop 10th Anniversary: Zero Accidents on the Job	2000
Clinton	Disco and the Halfway to Discontent	2000
Los Amigos Invisibles	Arepa 3000	2000
Susana Baca	Eco do Sombras	2000
Jim White	No Such Place	2001
Jim White	Gimme Five	2001
David Byrne	Look into the Eyeball	2001
Geggy Tah	Into the Oh	2001
Shuggie Otis	World Psychedelic Classics 2: California Soul: Inspiration Information	2001
Los de Abajo	Cybertropic Chilango Power	2001
Si*Sé	Si*Sé	2001
Si*Sé	The Rain (Where Do I Begin?) (EP)	2001
Susana Baca	Espiritu Vivo	2002
Moreno + Two	Music Typewriter	2002
Various Artists	The Only Blip Hop Record You’ll Ever Need, Vol. 1	2002
Various Artists	Cuisine Non-Stop: Introduction to The French Nouvelle Generation	2002
Various Artists	World Psychedelic Classics, Vol. 3: Love's a Real Thing	2004
Domenico + Two	Sincerely Hot	2004
Los Amigos Invisibles	The Venezuelan Zinga Son, Vol. 1	2004
Zap Mama	Ancestry in Progress	2004
Jim White	Drill a Hole in That Substrate and Tell Me What You See	2004
Jim White	Music from Searching For the Wrong-Eyed Jesus	2005
Zap Mama	Push It To The Max (EP)	2006
Tom Zé	Estudande O Pagode: Na Opereta Segregamulher E Amor	2006
Various Artists	Luaka Bop Remix	2006
Susana Baca	Travesías	2006
Os Mutantes	Mutantes Ao Vivo – Barbican Theatre, Londres 2006	2007
Kassin +2	Futurismo	2008
Various Artists	Brazil Classics at 20: Anti-Aging Secret	2008
Various Artists	Brazil Classics 7: What's Happening In Pernambuco: New Sounds of the Brazilian Northeast	2008
Jim White	Transnormal Skiperoo	2008
Jim White	A Funny Little Cross To Bear	2009
Susana Baca	Seis Poemas	2009
Yoñlu	A Society In Which No Tear Is Shed Is Inconceivably Mediocre	2009
Marcio Local	Says Don Day Don Dree Don Don: Adventures In Samba Soul	2009
Various Artists	Luaka Bop: Twenty First Century, Twenty First Year	2009
The Terror Pigeon Dance Revolt!	I Love You I Love You I Love You and I’m In Love With You! Have an Awesome Day!	2009
Kings Go Forth	The Outsiders Are Back	2010
Kings Go Forth	Don't Take My Shadow: The Tom Moulton Mixes	2010
Tom Zé	Studies of Tom Zé: Explaining Things So I Can Confuse You (Compilation)	2010
Tom Zé	Estudando A Bossa (Nordeste Plaza)	2010
Javelin	No Mas	2010
Javelin	"Coleridge" b/w "Colleagues"	2011
Javelin	Canyon Candy	2011
Susana Baca	Afrodiaspora	2011
Delicate Steve	Wondervisions	2011
Delicate Steve	Positive Force	2012
Bright Moments	Natives	2012
Janka Nabay & The Bubu Gang	En Yay Sah	2012
Tim Maia	World Psychedelic Classics 4: Nobody Can Live Forever – The Existential Soul of Tim Maia	2012
Javelin	EP 1 & EP 2	2012
Javelin	Hi Beams	2013
Various Artists	Adventures in Afropea 3: Telling Stories to the Sea	2013
William Onyeabor	World Psychedelic Classics 5: Who is William Onyeabor?	2013
Moreno Veloso	Coisa Boa	2014
William Onyeabor	Box Set 1	2014
William Onyeabor	Box Set 2	2014
William Onyeabor	What?! (Remixes and covers)	2014
William Onyeabor	Body & Soul	2015
William Onyeabor	Crashes in Love (Original Version)	2015
William Onyeabor	Crashes in Love (2nd Version)	2015
William Onyeabor	Good Name	2015
William Onyeabor	Tomorrow	2015
William Onyeabor	Body & Soul	2015
William Onyeabor	Great Lover	2015
William Onyeabor	Hypertension	2015
William Onyeabor	Anything You Sow	2015
Doug Hream Blunt	My Name Is Doug Hream Blunt	2015
Floating Points	Elaenia	2015
Floating Points	Kuiper	2016
William Onyeabor	Atomic Bomb	2016
Janka Nabay & The Bubu Gang	Build Music	2017
Floating Points	Reflections: Mojave Desert	2017
Alice Coltrane	World Spirituality Classics 1: The Ecstatic Music of Alice Coltrane Turiyasangitananda	2017
Kassin	Relax	2018
Domenico Lancellotti	The Good Is a Big God	2018
Panduranga John Henderson	Ocean Of Love	2018
Preacherman	Universal Philosophy: Preacherman Plays T.J. Hustler's Greatest Hits	2018
Various Artists	World Spirituality Classics 2: The Time for Peace Is Now: Gospel Music About Us	2019
Bremer/McCoy	Utopia	2019
Bremer/McCoy	Natten	2021
Floating Points, Pharoah Sanders & the London Symphony Orchestra	Promises	2021
Pastor Champion	I Just Want to be a Good Man	2022
Alhaji Waziri Oshomah	World Spirituality Classics 3: The Muslim Highlife Of Alhaji Waziri Oshomah	2022
Alhaji Waziri Oshomah	Vol. 1-5 (1978-1984)	2022
Staples Jr. Singers	When Do We Get Paid	2022
Staples Jr. Singers	Tell Heaven (EP)	2023
Pharoah Sanders	Pharoah	2023
Staples Jr. Singers	Searching	2024
Bremer/McCoy	Kosmos	2024
Annie & The Caldwells	Can't Lose My (Soul)	2025
Leenalchi	Here Comes That Crow (EP)	2026
