= Live discography =

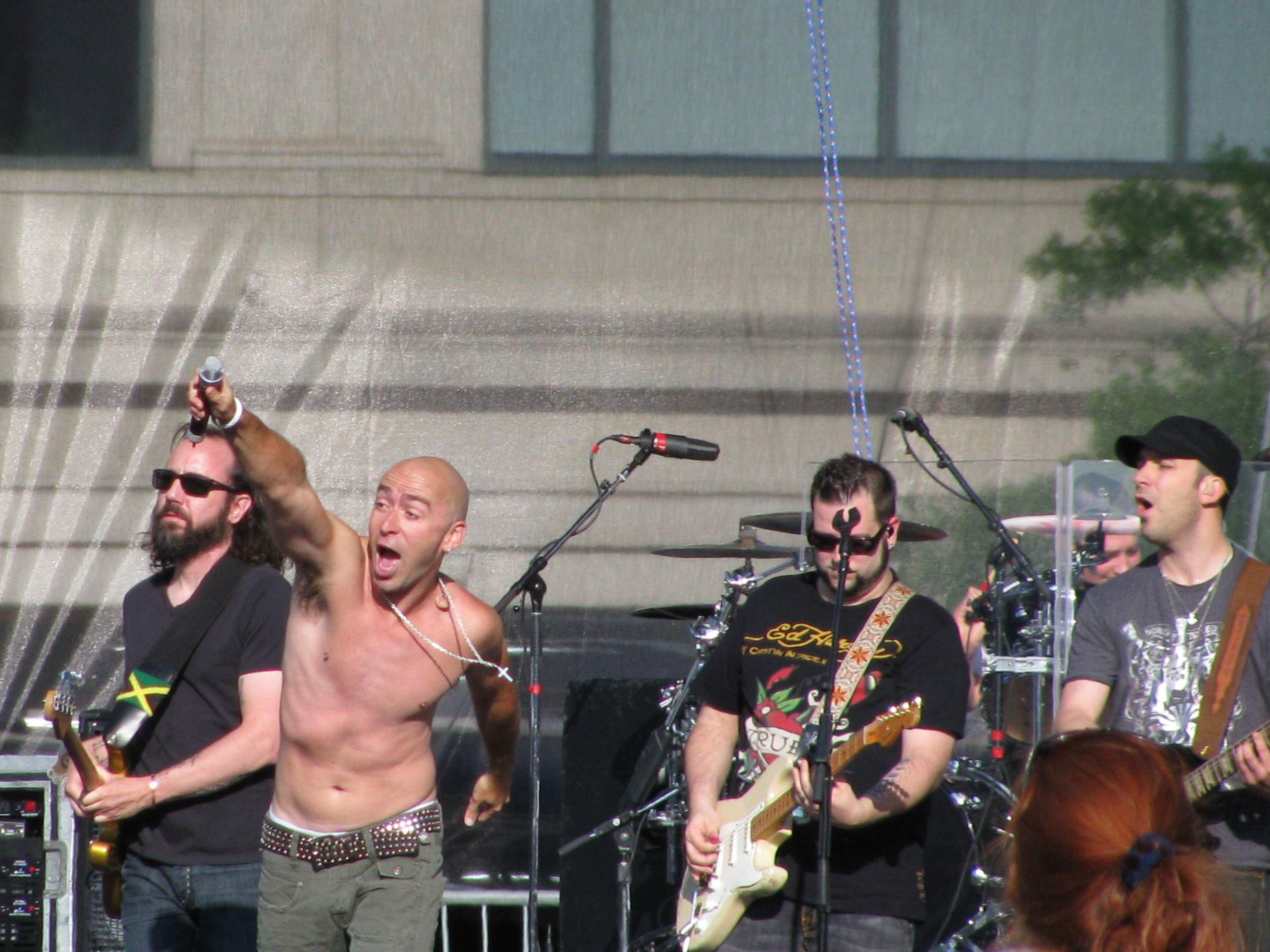
- Studio albums: 9
- Extended plays: 3
- Live albums: 1
- Compilation albums: 2
- Singles: 28
- Music videos: 26

The discography of the American rock band Live consists of nine studio albums (including The Death of a Dictionary, recorded when the band was known as Public Affection), one live album, two compilation albums, three extended plays, twenty-eight singles and twenty-six music videos. After initially self-releasing a full-length album and an EP under the name Public Affection, their first studio album as Live, 1991's Mental Jewelry, peaked at number 73 on the Billboard 200. The single "Operation Spirit (The Tyranny of Tradition)" peaked at number nine on the Alternative Songs chart.

Live achieved commercial success with their next album, 1994's Throwing Copper. Helped by the singles "Selling the Drama", "I Alone", "Lightning Crashes", and "All Over You", the album reached number one on the music charts in the United States, Australia, New Zealand, and Canada. It went platinum eight times in the US and seven times in Canada. Throwing Copper is Live's best-selling album. "Selling the Drama" and "Lightning Crashes" both reached number one on the Alternative Songs chart.

The band's fourth album, Secret Samadhi, was released in 1997. It peaked at number one in the US, New Zealand, and Canada, and it went platinum twice in both the US and Canada. One single from the album, "Lakini's Juice", peaked at number one on the Alternative Songs chart.

In 1999, Live's fifth album, The Distance to Here, was released. It went to number one on the Australia and Canada charts and was certified platinum in the US and Canada. The band then released the studio albums V and Birds of Pray in 2001 and 2003, respectively, before releasing their first compilation album, Awake: The Best of Live, in 2004. Songs from Black Mountain, their seventh studio album, was released in 2006. The band has sold over 20 million albums worldwide.

== Albums ==
=== Studio albums ===
Studio albums by Live
Title	Album details	Chart positions										Certifications
Title	Album details	US	AUS	BEL	CAN	GER	NLD	NZ	SWE	SWI	UK	Certifications
The Death of a Dictionary (as Public Affection)	Released: August 17, 1989; Label: Action Front Records; Format: CS	—	—	—	—	—	—	—	—	—	—	
Mental Jewelry	Released: December 31, 1991; Label: Radioactive; Format: CD, CS	73	137	—	—	—	—	—	—	—	—	RIAA: Platinum; MC: Gold; NVPI: Gold
Throwing Copper	Released: April 26, 1994; Label: Radioactive; Format: CD, CS	1	1	8	1	28	5	1	11	—	37	RIAA: 8× Platinum; ARIA: 10× Platinum; BPI: Gold; BRMA: Gold; IFPI SWE: Gold; MC: 7× Platinum; NVPI: Platinum; RMNZ: 6× Platinum
Secret Samadhi	Released: February 18, 1997; Label: Radioactive; Format: CD, CS, LP	1	2	3	1	23	4	1	8	17	31	RIAA: 2× Platinum; ARIA: 2× Platinum; MC: 2× Platinum; NVPI: Platinum; RMNZ: Platinum
The Distance to Here	Released: October 5, 1999; Label: Radioactive; Format: CD, CS	4	1	1	1	13	2	2	6	47	56	RIAA: Platinum; ARIA: 2× Platinum; BRMA: Gold; MC: Platinum; NVPI: 2× Platinum; RMNZ: Platinum
V	Released: September 18, 2001; Label: Radioactive; Format: CD, CS	22	1	2	5	17	1	1	6	37	80	ARIA: Gold; BRMA: Gold; NVPI: Gold; RMNZ: Gold
Birds of Pray	Released: May 20, 2003; Label: Radioactive; Format: CD	28	3	4	73	43	1	10	13	71	199	ARIA: Platinum; NVPI: Gold; RMNZ: Gold
Songs from Black Mountain	Released: June 6, 2006; Label: Epic; Format: CD	52	4	14	21	73	1	6	14	73	172	ARIA: Gold
The Turn	Released: October 28, 2014; Label: Think Loud Recordings; Format: CD	133	—	139	—	—	—	—	—	—	—	
"—" denotes releases that did not chart.

=== Compilation albums ===
Compilation albums by Live
Title	Album details	Peak chart positions								Certifications
Title	Album details	US	AUS	BEL	CAN	NLD	NOR	NZL	SWE	Certifications
Awake: The Best of Live	Released: November 2, 2004; Label: Radioactive Records	65	4	14	55	3	2	1	45	ARIA: Platinum; RMNZ: 2× Platinum
Radiant Sea: A Collection of Bootleg Rarities and Two New Songs	Released: September 14, 2007; Label: Action Front Records	—	—	—	—	—	—	—	—	
"—" denotes releases that did not chart.

In addition, live acoustic versions of "Lightning Crashes" and "Run to the Water" were included on the compilation album Cold Live at the Chapel (later known as Cold Live at the Chapel Volume 1). These were recordings from the Australian television music show Live at the Chapel in 2000.

=== Live albums ===
Live albums by Live
Title	Album details	Peak chart positions		
Title	Album details	AUS	BEL	NLD
Live at the Paradiso – Amsterdam	Released: November 11, 2008; Label: Vanguard	63	46	2

== EPs ==
- Divided Mind, Divided Planet (1990)
- Four Songs (1991)
- Local 717 (2018)

== Singles ==
Singles by Live
Year	Title	Peak chart positions										Certifications	Album
Year	Title	US	US Alt.	AUS	BEL (FL)	CAN	CAN Alt.	GER	NLD	NZL	UK	Certifications	Album
1991	"Operation Spirit (The Tyranny of Tradition)"	—	9	—	—	—	—	—	—	—	—		Mental Jewelry
1992	"Pain Lies on the Riverside"	—	24	142	—	—	—	—	—	—	—		Mental Jewelry
1992	"The Beauty of Gray"	—	—	—	—	—	—	—	—	—	—		Mental Jewelry
1994	"Selling the Drama"	43	1	49	—	41	—	89	15	—	30		Throwing Copper
1994	"I Alone"	— (Note: "I Alone" did not enter the Billboard Hot 100, but peaked at number 38 on the Hot 100 Airplay chart.)	6	97	—	—	—	—	20	—	48		Throwing Copper
1995	"Lightning Crashes"	— (Note: "Lightning Crashes" did not enter the Billboard Hot 100, but peaked at number 12 on the Hot 100 Airplay chart.)	1	13	—	3	—	—	—	—	33	RMNZ: 3× Platinum	Throwing Copper
1995	"All Over You"	— (Note: "All Over You" did not enter the Billboard Hot 100, but peaked at number 33 on the Hot 100 Airplay chart.)	4	52	—	18	3	—	—	—	48		Throwing Copper
1995	"White, Discussion"	— (Note: "White, Discussion" did not enter the Billboard Hot 100, but peaked at number 71 on the Hot 100 Airplay chart.)	15	—	—	—	—	—	—	—	—		Throwing Copper
1997	"Lakini's Juice"	— (Note: "Lakini's Juice" did not enter the Billboard Hot 100, but peaked at number 35 on the Hot 100 Airplay chart.)	1	21	—	20	1	—	69	37	29		Secret Samadhi
1997	"Freaks"	— (Note: "Freaks" did not enter the Billboard Hot 100, but peaked at number 73 on the Hot 100 Airplay chart.)	13	36	—	56	13	—	80	—	60		Secret Samadhi
1997	"Turn My Head"	— (Note: "Turn My Head" did not enter the Billboard Hot 100, but peaked at number 45 on the Hot 100 Airplay chart.)	3	47	69	16	4	—	67	—	—		Secret Samadhi
1997	"Rattlesnake"	—	18	—	—	—	13	—	—	—	—		Secret Samadhi
1999	"The Dolphin's Cry"	78	3	25	7	—	1	—	10	48	62	ARIA: Gold; RMNZ: Gold	The Distance to Here
2000	"Run to the Water"	—	14	34	57	—	10	—	49	44	—		The Distance to Here
2000	"They Stood Up for Love"	—	31	88	1	—	—	—	44	—	—		The Distance to Here
2001	"Simple Creed" (featuring Tricky)	—	18	43	54	—	—	—	18	—	—		V
2001	"Overcome"	—	30	68	2	—	—	—	3	—	—		V
2002	"Forever May Not Be Long Enough"	—	—	—	68	—	—	—	59	—	—		V
2003	"Heaven"	59	33	19	56	—	—	—	30	16	—		Birds of Pray
2003	"Run Away"	—	—	—	—	—	—	—	41	—	—		Birds of Pray
2003	"Sweet Release"	—	—	61	—	—	—	—	—	—	—		Birds of Pray
2004	"We Deal in Dreams"	—	—	—	—	—	—	—	47	—	—		Awake: The Best of Live
2006	"The River"	—	—	33	49	—	—	—	15	—	—		Songs from Black Mountain
2006	"Mystery"	—	—	—	—	—	—	—	—	—	—		Songs from Black Mountain
2006	"Wings"	—	—	—	—	—	—	—	—	—	—		Songs from Black Mountain
2009	"Forever"	—	—	—	—	—	—	—	—	25	—		Live at the Paradiso
2014	"The Way Around Is Through"	—	— (Note: "The Way Around Is Through" did not enter the Alternative Airplay chart, but peaked at number 30 on the Mainstream Rock chart.)	—	—	—	—	—	—	—	—		The Turn
2018	"Love Lounge"	—	—	—	—	—	—	—	—	—	—		Local 717
2018	"Be a Giver, Man"	—	—	—	—	—	—	—	—	—	—		Local 717
2024	"Lady Bhang (She Got Me Rolling)" (featuring Dean DeLeo)	—	—	—	—	—	—	—	—	—	—		Non-album single
"—" denotes a release that did not chart.

== Music videos ==
Music videos by Live
Year	Song	Director(s)
1991	"Operation Spirit (The Tyranny of Tradition)"	George Seminara
1991	"Pain Lies on the Riverside"	Ron Keith
1994	"Selling the Drama"	Julia Heyward, Phyllis Famiglietti
1994	"I Alone"	Tim Pope
1994	"Lightning Crashes"	Jake Scott
1995	"White, Discussion" (Version 1)	Tom Giovarell
1995	"White, Discussion" (Version 2)	Josh Taft
1997	"Lakini's Juice"	Gavin Bowden
1997	"Freaks"	Paul Cunningham
1997	"Turn My Head"	Mary Lambert
1997	"Turn My Head" (John Register Version)	Jake Scott
1997	"Ghost"	Mark Neale
1999	"The Dolphin's Cry"	Martin Weisz
2000	"Run to the Water"	Martin Weisz
2000	"They Stood Up for Love"	Kai Sehr
2001	"Forever May Not Be Long Enough"	Mary Lambert
2001	"Simple Creed"	Marc Webb
2001	"Overcome"	Mary Lambert
2001	"Overcome" (with Ground Zero Footage)	Steven Rosenbaum
2002	"Like a Soldier"	Matt Bass
2003	"Heaven" (Version 1)	Arni & Kinski
2003	"Heaven" (Version 2)	Peter Van Eyndt
2004	"Run Away"	Mary Lambert
2006	"The River"	Nathan Cox
2014	"The Way Around Is Through"	
2018	"Love Lounge"	Clay Patrick McBride

== Live songs in film ==
- "The Dam at Otter Creek" – In the Army Now (1994)
- "White, Discussion (Sever & Reynolds Remix)" – Virtuosity (1995)
- "The Dolphin's Cry" – Urban Legends: Final Cut (2000)*
- "Forever May Not Be Long Enough" – The Mummy Returns (2001)
- "Deep Enough" (Remix) – The Fast and the Furious (2001)*
- "Hold Me Up" – Zack and Miri Make a Porno (2008)*
- "Lightning Crashes" – Kodachrome (2017)

* indicates that the track does not appear on the film's soundtrack album.
