= Live at the Paradiso – Amsterdam =

Live album by Live
- Released: November 11, 2008
- Recorded: June 30 – July 1, 2008, Paradiso, Amsterdam, Netherlands
- Genre: Alternative rock; post-grunge; hard rock
- Length: 70:01
- Label: Vanguard

Live chronology
Radiant Sea: A Collection of Bootleg Rarities and Two New Songs (2007)	Live at the Paradiso – Amsterdam (2008)	The Turn (2014)

Singles from Live at the Paradiso – Amsterdam
- 1. "Forever" Released: 2008

Live at the Paradiso – Amsterdam is the first live concert album and DVD from the American rock band Live.

== History ==
The DVD and CD were recorded over two nights at the Paradiso in Amsterdam. Two studio recordings, "Forever" and "Purifier" are included on the album. Singer Ed Kowalczyk said of them, "Both songs kind of have this urgency about them, where we almost missed our deadlines. You can feel the urgency and the energy of the session in the songs".

Despite the fact that the band was on the verge of breaking up, guitarist Chad Taylor was pleased with the DVD. "When I saw the magic that was on camera, I was overcome by emotion. We had documented the energy and efforts of a 20-year career together." However, the long-standing tensions between lead singer Ed Kowalczyk and the other three band members were boiling over. "When the album artwork showed up with Chad, Patrick and I in black and white and Ed in color it shot pain through my veins."

Taylor also revealed that Kowalczyk was unhappy with his playing during the tour which included the Paradiso concerts, "For some reason on that tour Ed would complain about the tuning of my guitar each and every night in the dressing room following the show. He would call Patrick at all hours of the night asking if we sounded okay. I had long talks with the techs. I begged someone to give me anything tangible that I could work on or fix. The board tapes sounded fine but the constant complaining was driving me mad. It was sucking the life out of me on stage."

== Track listing ==
Compact Disc

1. "Simple Creed" – 4:03
2. "All Over You" – 3:53
3. "The River" – 3:12
4. "The Dolphin's Cry" – 4:37
5. "I Walk the Line" (Johnny Cash) – 3:20
6. "Selling the Drama" – 3:28
7. "Lightning Crashes" – 5:44
8. "Turn My Head" – 4:09
9. "I Alone" – 6:14
10. "Heaven" – 4:07
11. "Lakini's Juice" – 6:00
12. "Overcome" – 4:38
13. "Operation Spirit" – 3:49
14. "Dance with You" – 5:34
15. "Forever" – 3:54
16. "Purifier" – 3:19

iTunes Store bonus track

17. "They Stood Up for Love" – 5:22

DVD

1. "Simple Creed"
2. "All Over You"
3. "Mirror Song"
4. "The River"
5. "The Dolphin's Cry"
6. "I Walk the Line"
7. "Selling the Drama"
8. "They Stood Up for Love"
9. "Lightning Crashes"
10. "Turn My Head"
11. "Wings"
12. "I Alone"
13. "Heaven"
14. "Lakini's Juice"
15. "Overcome"
16. "Operation Spirit"
17. "Dance with You"

== Personnel ==
Live

- Ed Kowalczyk – lead vocals, acoustic guitar
- Chad Taylor – lead guitar, backing vocals
- Patrick Dahlheimer – bass
- Chad Gracey – drums

Additional musicians

- Christian Matthew Cullen – keyboards on "Purifier"
- Adam Kowalczyk – rhythm guitar, backing vocals

== Charts ==
=== Weekly charts ===
Weekly chart performance for Live at the Paradiso – Amsterdam
Chart (2008)	Peak position
Australian Albums (ARIA)	63
Belgian Albums (Ultratop Flanders)	46
Dutch Albums (Album Top 100)	2

=== Year-end charts ===
Year-end chart performance for Live at the Paradiso – Amsterdam
Chart (2008)	Position
Dutch Albums (Album Top 100)	70

=== Singles ===
- "Forever" (#25 New Zealand)

== Certifications ==
Certifications for Live at the Paradiso – Amsterdam
Region	Certification	Certified units/sales
Australia (ARIA)	Platinum	15,000^{^}
^{^} Shipments figures based on certification alone.
