= Awake: The Best of Live =

Greatest hits album by Live
- Released: November 2, 2004
- Recorded: 1990–2004
- Genre: Alternative rock; post-grunge; hard rock
- Length: 77:49
- Label: Radioactive
- Producer: Jerry Harrison, Live, Jay Healy, Michael Railo, Alain Johannes, and Jim Wirt

Live chronology
| Birds of Pray (2003) | Awake: The Best of Live (2004) | Songs from Black Mountain (2006) |

Singles from Awake: The Best of Live
- 1. "We Deal in Dreams" Released: October 29, 2004

Professional ratings
Review scores
| Source | Rating |
|---|---|
| AllMusic | 4.5/5 stars |

Awake: The Best of Live is a greatest hits album by the American rock band Live, released in 2004. The 19-track compilation includes songs from Live's first six studio albums as well as "We Deal in Dreams", an unreleased track from the Throwing Copper sessions, and a cover of "I Walk the Line" by Johnny Cash, recorded for the 2001 compilation Good Rockin' Tonight – The Legacy of Sun Records. The deluxe edition includes a DVD containing 22 music videos and a 30-minute interview with lead singer Ed Kowalczyk. The liner notes were written by Kowalczyk and Ken Wilber and the cover features a still from the video for the song "Lightning Crashes".

== Track listing ==
Compact Disc

1. "Operation Spirit (The Tyranny of Tradition)" – 3:18
2. "Pain Lies on the Riverside" (new edit) – 4:32
3. "The Beauty of Gray" – 4:12
4. "Selling the Drama" – 3:25
5. "I Alone" (new edit) – 3:40
6. "Lightning Crashes" – 5:24
7. "All Over You" – 3:57
8. "Pillar of Davidson" (new edit) – 4:23
9. "We Deal in Dreams" – 3:55
10. "Lakini's Juice" (new edit) – 4:49
11. "Turn My Head" – 3:55
12. "The Dolphin's Cry" (new edit) – 4:19
13. "Run to the Water" – 4:26
14. "Dance with You" – 4:36
15. "Overcome" – 4:15
16. "Nobody Knows" – 4:27
17. "Heaven" – 3:46
18. "Run Away" (with Shelby Lynne) – 3:27
19. "I Walk the Line" (Johnny Cash cover) – 3:03

The European release of Awake does not feature "Pain Lies on the Riverside" or "Pillar of Davidson", but instead contains "They Stood Up for Love" (acoustic version) and "The Distance".

The Australian release also omits "Pain Lies on the Riverside" and "Pillar of Davidson" but includes "Rattlesnake" and "They Stood Up for Love".

DVD

1. "Operation Spirit"
2. "Operation Spirit" (live performance)
3. "Pain Lies on the Riverside"
4. "Pain Lies on the Riverside" (live performance)
5. "Selling the Drama"
6. "I Alone"
7. "Lightning Crashes"
8. "White, Discussion"
9. "Lakini's Juice"
10. "Freaks"
11. "Turn My Head" (directed by Jake Scott)
12. "Turn My Head" (directed by Mary Lambert)
13. "Ghost"
14. "The Dolphin's Cry"
15. "Run to the Water"
16. "They Stood Up for Love"
17. "Overcome"
18. "Simple Creed"
19. "Like a Soldier"
20. "Heaven" (live at Vorst National, Brussels)
21. "Heaven" (concept version)
22. "Run Away" (with Shelby Lynne)
23. Interview with Ed Kowalczyk

== Chart performance ==
=== Weekly charts ===
| Chart (2004) | Peak position |
|---|---|
| Australian Albums (ARIA) | 4 |
| Belgian Albums (Ultratop Flanders) | 14 |
| Dutch Albums (Album Top 100) | 3 |
| New Zealand Albums (RMNZ) | 1 |
| Norwegian Albums (VG-lista) | 2 |
| Swedish Albums (Sverigetopplistan) | 45 |
| US Billboard 200 | 65 |

=== Year-end charts ===
| Chart (2004) | Position |
|---|---|
| Australian Albums (ARIA) | 52 |
| Dutch Albums (Album Top 100) | 57 |
| Chart (2005) | Position |
| Australian Albums (ARIA) | 81 |
| New Zealand Albums (RMNZ) | 30 |

=== Singles ===
- "We Deal in Dreams" (#47 Netherlands)

== Certifications ==
| Region | Certification | Certified units/sales |
|---|---|---|
| Australia (ARIA) | Platinum | 70,000^{^} |
| New Zealand (RMNZ) | 2× Platinum | 30,000^{^} |
^{^} Shipments figures based on certification alone.
