= The Turn (Live album) =

Studio album by Live
- Released: October 28, 2014
- Genres: Alternative rock; post-grunge; hard rock
- Length: 49:10
- Label: Think Loud Recordings
- Producers: Jerry Harrison, Live

Live chronology
Live at the Paradiso – Amsterdam (2008)	The Turn (2014)	Local 717 (2018)

Singles from The Turn
- 1. "The Way Around Is Through" Released: September 16, 2014

Professional ratings
Review scores
Source	Rating
Allmusic	3/5 stars
Classic Rock	3.5/5 stars
Laut.de	2/5 stars
Plattentests.de	6/10
Rock Hard	8.5/10

The Turn is the eighth studio album by the American rock band Live, released on October 28, 2014. It is their only release with lead singer Chris Shinn and is their final LP to feature guitarist Chad Taylor, bassist Patrick Dahlheimer, and drummer Chad Gracey, who were all fired from the band in 2022.

== History ==
The band announced that they would be taking a two-year hiatus in June 2009, but in November, guitarist Chad Taylor revealed that lead singer Ed Kowalczyk had left the band. Kowalczyk (who has since rejoined Live) released a solo album Alive in June 2010, while the remaining three members of Live formed a new band, The Gracious Few, with singer Kevin Martin and guitarist Sean Hennesy, both of Candlebox. Their self-titled album was released in September 2010.

On March 12, 2012 Chris Shinn, former lead singer of the band Unified Theory, was revealed to have joined Live when he played with them at a show at the Strand-Capitol Performing Arts Center in York. Live's first major tour with Shinn was as part of the Summerland Tour 2013, playing 35 shows across the US.

The first single from The Turn, "The Way Around Is Through" was released on September 16, 2014. Live have also released full versions of the tracks "Siren's Call", "We Open the Door", "Natural Born Killers" and "Don't Run to Wait" via YouTube, each with an introduction by Chad Taylor.

The music on The Turn is jointly credited to all four members of Live, however none of the three remaining original band members receives a lyric writing credit. Shinn is credited as lyricist on all songs, with producer Jerry Harrison receiving a co-writing credit on seven tracks, his daughter Aishlin on three and songwriter Bruce Wallace on five.

As of Ed Kowalczyk's return to the band in 2016, The Turn has been removed from all streaming services and is no longer mentioned on the band's official website.

== Track listing ==
No.	Title	Lyrics	Music	Length
1.	"Siren's Call"	J Harrison, C Shinn, A Harrison, B Wallace	Live	4:10
2.	"Don't Run to Wait"	J. Harrison, Shinn	Live	3:47
3.	"Natural Born Killers"	Shinn, J. Harrison, A. Harrison	Live	4:36
4.	"6310 Rodgerton Dr."	J. Harrison, Shinn	Live	4:09
5.	"By Design"	Shinn, Wallace	Live	4:20
6.	"The Way Around Is Through"	Shinn, J. Harrison	Live	4:52
7.	"Need Tonight"	Shinn, Wallace	Live	4:11
8.	"The Strength to Hold On"	Shinn, Wallace	Live	5:32
9.	"We Open the Door"	Shinn, Wallace	Live	4:52
10.	"He Could Teach the Devil Tricks"	J. Harrison, Shinn	Live	4:09
11.	"Till You Came Around"	J. Harrison, Shinn, A. Harrison	Live	4:42

== Personnel ==
Live

- Chris Shinn – vocals, rhythm guitar
- Chad Taylor – lead guitar
- Patrick Dahlheimer – bass
- Chad Gracey – drums

Additional personnel

- Dana Alexandra – backing vocals
- Aishlin Harrison – backing vocals
- Jerry Harrison – production
- Alexander LeFever – backing vocals

== Charts ==
=== Album ===
Chart	Peak
Belgium (Flanders) Albums Chart	139
US Billboard 200	133

=== Singles ===
Song	Peak chart positions
Song	US Main.
"The Way Around Is Through"	30
