= Songs from Black Mountain =

Studio album by Live
- Released: April 10, 2006
- Recorded: May 2005
- Genre: Alternative rock; post-grunge; hard rock
- Length: 42:23
- Label: Epic
- Producer: Jim Wirt

Live chronology
Awake: The Best of Live (2004)	Songs from Black Mountain (2006)	Radiant Sea: A Collection of Bootleg Rarities and Two New Songs (2007)

Singles from Songs from Black Mountain
- 1. "The River" Released: March 21, 2006; 2. "Mystery" Released: 2006; 3. "Wings" Released: 2006

Professional ratings
Aggregate scores
Source	Rating
Metacritic	50/100
Review scores
Source	Rating
AllMusic	4/5 stars
Alternative Addiction	4.5/5 stars
Billboard	unfavorable
Entertainment Weekly	B−
musicOMH	1/5 stars
Paste	1/10
Rolling Stone	2/5 stars
Slant Magazine	1.5/5 stars

Songs from Black Mountain is the seventh studio album by the American rock band Live. It was released in most countries on April 10, 2006, but was released on May 9 in Canada, May 29 in the UK and June 6 in the US. It was their only release through Epic Records. The first single, "The River", was released on March 21, 2006. It is the last album to feature lead vocalist Ed Kowalczyk before his departure from the band in 2009. It is also the final studio album to feature the original lineup (Kowalczyk, Chad Taylor, Patrick Dahlheimer, Chad Gracey). Kowalcyzk rejoined in 2016, but Taylor, Dahlheimer, and Gracey were all fired from the band by the end of 2022.

Although the album had some international success, including reaching number 1 in the Netherlands, it had the lowest US sales of any of Live's studio albums since their first album, Mental Jewelry, peaking at number 52 on the Billboard 200.

== Background ==
Live signed with Epic Records in 2005, having left Radioactive after the release of their 2003 album, Birds of Pray. Singer Ed Kowalczyk explained that Songs from Black Mountain is in the same vein as Birds of Pray: "The album itself kind of took its lead from where we were with Birds of Pray, which was just a really basic, stripped [approach]...It's just amazing. It's just a great album and the excitement level of [Epic] and the band, everybody is just really pretty blown away by it."

== Track listing ==
All tracks are written by Ed Kowalczyk.

Songs from Black Mountain track listing
No.	Title	Length
1.	"The River"	2:58
2.	"Mystery"	3:45
3.	"Get Ready"	3:32
4.	"Show"	3:24
5.	"Wings"	3:51
6.	"Sofia"	3:54
7.	"Love Shines (A Song for My Daughters About God)"	3:21
8.	"Where Do We Go from Here?"	3:46
9.	"Home"	3:23
10.	"All I Need"	3:13
11.	"You Are Not Alone"	3:43
12.	"Night of Nights"	3:33
Total length:		42:23

== Personnel ==
Live

- Patrick Dahlheimer – bass guitar
- Chad Gracey – drums
- Ed Kowalczyk – lead vocals, rhythm guitar, executive production
- Chad Taylor – lead guitar

Additional personnel

- Charlie Bisharat – violin on "Mystery"
- Dom Camardella – Hammond organ on "Get Ready", "Love Shines (A Song for My Daughters About God)", and "Home", additional engineering
- David Campbell – string arrangement on "Mystery", conducting on "Mystery"
- David Coleman – art direction
- Larry Corbett – cello on "Mystery"
- Brian Dembow – viola on "Mystery"
- Andrew Duckles – viola on "Mystery"
- C. J. Eiriksson – engineering
- Laurence Greenfield – violin on "Mystery"
- Julian Hallmark – violin on "Mystery"
- Gerardo Hilera – violin on "Mystery"
- Ted Jensen – mastering
- Phil Kaffel – additional engineering
- Suzie Katayama – cello on "Mystery"
- Gary Kurfirst – executive production
- Timothy Landauer – cello on "Mystery"
- Adam Olmstead – assistant mixing
- Alyssa Park – violin on "Mystery"
- Readymade99 – artwork, design
- Myriam Santos-Kayda – photography
- Haim Shtrum – violin on "Mystery"
- David Thoener – mixing
- Philip Vaiman – violin on "Mystery"
- Jim Wirt – engineering, production

== Charts ==
=== Weekly charts ===
Chart (2006)	Peak position
Australian Albums (ARIA)	4
Austrian Albums (Ö3 Austria)	66
Belgian Albums (Ultratop Flanders)	14
Dutch Albums (Album Top 100)	1
German Albums (Offizielle Top 100)	73
New Zealand Albums (RMNZ)	6
Norwegian Albums (VG-lista)	4
Swedish Albums (Sverigetopplistan)	14
Swiss Albums (Schweizer Hitparade)	73
US Billboard 200	52
US Top Rock Albums (Billboard)	18

=== Year-end charts ===
Chart (2006)	Position
Dutch Albums (Album Top 100)	65

=== Singles ===
Song	Peak chart positions		
Song	AUS	BEL (FL)	NED
"The River"	33	49	15
"Mystery"	—	—	—
"Wings"	—	—	—
"—" denotes releases that did not chart

== Certifications ==
Region	Certification	Certified units/sales
Australia (ARIA)	Gold	35,000^{^}
^{^} Shipments figures based on certification alone.
