= Birds of Pray =

Studio album by Live
- Released: May 20, 2003
- Recorded: The Village, Los Angeles, CA; 4th Street Recording, Santa Monica, CA
- Genre: Alternative rock, post-grunge, hard rock
- Length: 44:20
- Label: Radioactive
- Producer: Jim Wirt

Live chronology
V (2001)	Birds of Pray (2003)	Awake: The Best of Live (2004)

Singles from Birds of Pray
- 1. "Heaven" Released: April 7, 2003; 2. "Run Away" Released: September 29, 2003; 3. "Sweet Release" Released: October 6, 2003

Birds of Pray is the sixth studio album by Live, released in 2003. The first single, "Heaven" became the band's most successful single in several years, reaching number 59 on the Billboard Hot 100. Birds of Pray was Live's final release on Radioactive/MCA. They signed with Epic in 2005.

== Background ==
Ed Kowalczyk's lyrics on this album return to the spiritual territory of The Distance to Here. Guitarist Chad Taylor explained that the tensions between Kowalczyk and the other three members that eventually caused the band to split from him surfaced in 1999, and had grown worse during the album's recording sessions. "I wasn't sure how our rocker fanbase would feel about the lyrics." He expressed his frustration with the album by adding, "Jim Wirt (producer) worked really hard to fashion a contemporary album, but it never felt like the Live I loved."

== Reception ==
Professional ratings
Aggregate scores
Source	Rating
Metacritic	50/100
Review scores
Source	Rating
AllMusic	3/5 stars
Alternative Addiction	4/5 stars
Blender	2/5 stars
Entertainment Weekly	C
Q	3.5/5 stars
Rolling Stone	2/5 stars
Stylus Magazine	F

Birds of Pray debuted at number 28 on the Billboard 200, selling over 37,000 copies in its first week of release. By August 2005 it had sold 273,000 copies in the US. The album failed to reach gold status in the US, although it outsold 2001's V. The album received mixed reviews from critics and has a rating of 50 out of 100 on Metacritic.

AllMusic disliked Kowalczyk's lyrics, claiming they were "Either too literal or bewilderingly obtuse" and said that the album was, "Still recognizably Live...big, big guitars, sweeping anthemic choruses, earnest ballads, mildly histrionic vocals...but it's a little more subdued and a little more serious and quite streamlined...The biggest problem with the record is that the eye is on the big picture...to the extent that the individual moments aren't all that memorable, clearly lacking singles as forceful as those that fueled Throwing Copper." AllMusic concluded by claiming that, "Live is growing up and settling down, turning into a solid thirty-something rock band."

== Track listing ==
All songs written by Ed Kowalczyk except where noted.

1. "Heaven" – 3:49
2. "She" – 2:40
3. "The Sanctity of Dreams" – 3:33
4. "Run Away" – 3:53
5. "Life Marches On" – 2:53
6. "Like I Do" (Kowalczyk, Patrick Dahlheimer, Chad Taylor) – 4:14
7. "Sweet Release" – 3:02
8. "Everytime I See Your Face" – 3:16
9. "Lighthouse" (Kowalczyk, Taylor) – 3:08
10. "River Town" – 4:09
11. "Out to Dry" – 3:20
12. "Bring the People Together" – 3:02
13. "What Are We Fighting For?" – 3:21

British bonus tracks

14. "Forever May Not Be Long Enough" (Egyptian Dreams Remix) – 4:07
15. "Overcome" (Live from Philadelphia) – 4:23

Special edition bonus DVD
Live tracks recorded during the 2002 Pinkpop Festival in the Netherlands.

1. "Selling the Drama"
2. "Voodoo Lady"
3. "Nobody Knows"
4. "White Discussion"

== Personnel ==
Live

- Ed Kowalczyk – lead vocals, rhythm guitar, backing vocals
- Chad Taylor – lead guitar, backing vocals
- Patrick Dahlheimer – bass
- Chad Gracey – drums

Additional musicians

- Paul Buckmaster – conductor, string arrangements
- Larry Corbett – cello
- Joel Derouin – violin
- Bruce Dukov – violin
- Suzie Katayama – orchestra manager
- Patrick Warren – chamberlin
- Evan Wilson – viola

Technical personnel

- Michael Attardi – assistant engineering
- Neil Couser – assistant engineering
- CJ Eiriksson – digital editing
- Femio Hernández – assistant engineering
- John Ikuma – assistant engineer
- Ted Jensen – mastering
- Phil Kaffel – engineering
- Okhee Kim – assistant engineering
- Tom Lord-Alge – mixing
- Jeff Robinette – assistant engineering
- P.J. Smith – assistant engineering
- Michael Wilson – photography
- Jim Wirt – production, engineering
- Jesse Wright – design

== Charts ==
=== Weekly charts ===
Chart (2003)	Peak position
Australian Albums (ARIA)	3
Austrian Albums (Ö3 Austria)	27
Belgian Albums (Ultratop Flanders)	4
Belgian Albums (Ultratop Wallonia)	33
Canada Albums (Nielsen Soundscan)	73
Danish Albums (Hitlisten)	20
Dutch Albums (Album Top 100)	1
German Albums (Offizielle Top 100)	43
New Zealand Albums (RMNZ)	10
Norwegian Albums (VG-lista)	5
Swedish Albums (Sverigetopplistan)	13
Swiss Albums (Schweizer Hitparade)	71
UK Albums (OCC)	199
US Billboard 200	28

=== Year-end charts ===
Chart (2003)	Position
Australian Albums (ARIA)	59
Dutch Albums (Album Top 100)	40

=== Singles ===
Song	Peak chart positions					
Song	US	US Mod.	AUS	BEL (FL)	NED	NZ
"Heaven"	59	33	19	—^{[A]}	30	16
"Sweet Release"	—	—	—	—	—	—
"Run Away"	—	—	—	—	41	—
"—" denotes releases that did not chart

- A: "Heaven" did not chart on the Flemish Ultratop 50, but peaked at number 6 on the Ultratip chart.

== Certifications ==
Region	Certification	Certified units/sales
Australia (ARIA)	Platinum	70,000^{^}
Netherlands (NVPI)	Gold	40,000^{^}
New Zealand (RMNZ)	Gold	7,500^{^}
^{^} Shipments figures based on certification alone.
