= List of people from York, Pennsylvania =

The following people were all born in, residents of, or otherwise closely associated with York, Pennsylvania.

- John Adlum (1759–1836), pioneer viticulturist
- Dominick Argento (1927–2019), music composer
- Bruce Arians (born 1952), executive and former head coach for the NFL's Tampa Bay Buccaneers
- Charles Augustus Barnitz (1780–1850), politician
- Will Beatty (born 1985), offensive tackle, New York Giants (2009–16), Super Bowl XLVI champion
- J. Michael Bishop (1936–2026), Nobel Prize-winning virologist, part of the team who first identified an oncogene sequence
- Florence Brillinger (1891–1984), abstract artist
- Andrew R. Brodbeck (1860–1937), politician
- Edward Schroeder Brooks (1867–1957), politician
- Omar Brown (born 1975), gridiron football player
- John Hull Campbell (1800–1868), U.S. congressman for Pennsylvania's 3rd congressional district, 1845–1847
- Blaine Capatch (born 1965), comedian
- Chad Chronister (born 1967/1968), law enforcement officer
- Loretta Claiborne (born c. 1953), Special Olympics World Games multi-gold medalist and recipient of the 1996 ESPY Arthur Ashe Courage Award
- Herbert B. Cohen (1900–1970), Pennsylvania Supreme Court justice
- Nathaniel N. Craley, Jr. (1927–2006), politician
- Patrick Dahlheimer (born 1971), bass guitarist
- Sheila Darcy (1914–2004), actress
- Phineas Davis (1792–1835), clockmaker and inventor
- John A. Dempwolf (1848–1926), architect
- Jacob L. Devers (1887–1979), World War II U.S. Army general
- Neal Dodson (born 1978), award-winning feature film producer of All Is Lost; Broadway actor
- Chris Doleman (1961–2020), NFL defensive end
- William P. Doyle, commissioner of the Federal Maritime Commission
- John Durang (1768–1822), dancer and musician
- Luther P. Eisenhart (1876–1965), mathematician
- Stephen Etnier (1903–1984), artist
- James Ewing (1736–1806), Pennsylvania statesman
- Arthur Briggs Farquhar (1838–1925), businessman and writer
- William Henry Farquhar (1813–1887), developmental influencer of Montgomery County, Maryland
- William B. Franklin (1823–1903), American Civil War general
- Sam Freed (born 1948), actor
- James Gerry (1896–1973), politician
- Ernest Thomas Gilliard (1912–1965), ornithologist and museum curator
- Hugh Glasgow (1769–1818), politician, judge
- Glenalvin Goodridge (1829–1867), photographer and teacher
- William C. Goodridge (1805–1873), barber, merchant, Underground Railroad activist
- Chad Gracey (born 1971), drummer
- Halestorm (formed 1997), hard rock band
- Mahlon Haines (1875–1962), businessman and philanthropist
- Granville O. Haller (1819–1897), Civil War officer who led the defense of Adams and York counties during the Gettysburg campaign and later became a leading Seattle millionaire
- Mike Hawthorne (born 1975/1976), comic book and graphic novel illustrator
- Bob Hoffman (1898–1985), founder of York Barbell; considered the "father of American weightlifting"
- David Holmes (1769–1832), politician
- Jerry Howarth (born 1946), MLB announcer, voice of the Toronto Blue Jays
- Lois Hunt (1925–2009), soprano opera singer who toured for decades with baritone Earl Wrightson
- Carolina Isakson Proctor (1930–2012), First Lady of Colombia
- Woody Jackson (born 1970), musician
- Kevin Jones (born 1967), BMX rider
- Brian Keene (born 1967), best-selling novelist and comic book writer
- James Kelly (1760–1819), U.S. representative
- Matthew Knisely (born 1974), TV photojournalist
- Jeff Koons (born 1955), artist
- Tina Kotek (born 1966), governor of Oregon
- Ed Kowalczyk (born 1971), musician, lead singer of the band Live
- John Kuhn (born 1982), NFL fullback
- George M. Leader (1918–2013), 36th governor of Pennsylvania
- Ernest W. Lefever (1919–2009), foreign affairs expert
- Samuel S. Lewis (1874–1959), former Pennsylvania lieutenant governor
- Sylvia Lewis (born 1931), dancer and actress
- Live (1988–2009; re-formed 2011), alternative rock band
- Ken Ludwig (born 1950), playwright and theatre director
- Brian Lukacher, art historian
- Martie Maguire (born 1969), member of the country band Dixie Chicks
- Sarah J. Mahler (born 1959), author and cultural anthropologist
- Frances Lee McCain (born 1944), actress (Gremlins, Footloose, Back to the Future)
- Del McCoury (born 1939), bluegrass musician
- Whitney Metzler (born 1978), former competitive swimmer
- DeWolfe Miller III (born 1960), vice admiral and commander, Naval Air Forces
- Gary Miller (born 1946), conductor and gay activist
- Lewis Miller (1796–1882), artist and chronicler of early 19th-century life in York
- Cameron Mitchell (1918–1994), actor
- Eric Newcomer (born 1989), journalist
- Walt Partymiller (1912–1991), cartoonist
- Todd Platts (born 1962), politician
- The Quin-Tones (1957–1960; 1986–1990s), doo-wop group
- Ken Raffensberger (1917–2002), winning pitcher of 1944 Major League Baseball All-Star Game
- Charles H. Robertson (1934–2017), politician
- Chris Roupas (born 1957), Greek-American former basketball player
- Wayne Schafer (born 1963), pitmaster
- Harry E. Seyler (1908–1994), politician and educator
- Evan Sharp (born 1982), co-founder of Pinterest, graduated York Suburban High School 2001
- Craig Sheffer (born 1960), actor, Nightbreed (1990), A River Runs Through It (1992) and The Program (1993)
- Edgar Fahs Smith (1854–1928), scientist, chemist, historian
- James Smith (1719–1806), signer of the Declaration of Independence; lived on South George Street and is buried in York
- Frank Spellman (1922–2017), Olympic champion weightlifter
- George Stibitz (1904–1995), Bell Labs researcher and digital pioneer
- Chad Taylor (born 1970), guitarist
- John Terpak (1912–1993), champion weightlifter, York Barbell executive
- Charlie Thomas (1937–2023), R&B singer with The Drifters, lived in York in the 1990s
- Tim Warfield (born 1965), jazz musician
- Vic Wertz (1925–1983), professional baseball player
- Rebecca Wisocky (born 1971), television and stage actress
- Tom Wolf (born 1948), 47th governor of Pennsylvania
- Butch Wynegar (born 1956), major league baseball player
- Stanley Zeigler, politician
