= Four Songs (Live EP) =

EP by Live
- Released: September 24, 1991
- Genre: Rock
- Length: 16:13
- Label: Radioactive
- Producer: Jerry Harrison

Live chronology
| Divided Mind, Divided Planet (1990) | Four Songs (1991) | Mental Jewelry (1991) |

Professional ratings
Review scores
| Source | Rating |
|---|---|
| Allmusic | 3/5 stars |

Four Songs is an EP by Live, released in 1991.

It is the band's first release under the name Live. They previously released an album titled The Death of a Dictionary and an EP titled Divided Mind, Divided Planet under the name Public Affection.

Two songs from this EP, "Operation Spirit" and "Good Pain" later appeared on their album Mental Jewelry. The two other songs would later appear as b-sides to the European CD single for "Operation Spirit".

In 1994, Live released their second album, Throwing Copper. Both Europe and Australia released 2-CD set editions of the album with Four Songs as the second disc. The Australian issue of the EP, as part of this set, was labeled as a promotional copy although released in that country in 1991 as a stand-alone EP.

The EP was also released on 12-inch vinyl. Both green and black editions exist.

== Track listing ==
| No. | Title | Length |
|---|---|---|
| 1. | "Operation Spirit" | 3:19 |
| 2. | "Good Pain" | 5:39 |
| 3. | "Heaven Wore a Shirt" | 3:38 |
| 4. | "Negation" | 3:37 |

== Personnel ==
Live

- Ed Kowalczyk – lead vocals, rhythm guitar
- Chad Taylor – lead guitar, backing vocals
- Patrick Dahlheimer – bass
- Chad Gracey – drums
