= The Death of a Dictionary =

Studio album by Public Affection
- Released: August 17, 1989
- Recorded: 1989
- Genre: Alternative rock
- Length: 34:56
- Label: Action Front
- Producer: Benjy King

Public Affection chronology
The Death of a Dictionary (1989)	Divided Mind, Divided Planet (1990)

Professional ratings
Review scores
Source	Rating
AllMusic	2/5 stars

The Death of a Dictionary is the debut album by alternative rock band Public Affection, before they changed their name to Live. An EP titled Divided Mind, Divided Planet followed before the band changed their name.

== History ==
The album was released in June 1989, when the band members graduated from high school, via their own label, Action Front Records. Just 1,000 copies of the album were made, all on cassette, and it is long out of print. The track "Good Pain" was eventually reworked for inclusion on the first Live EP, Four Songs, and their debut album Mental Jewelry. Aside from "Good Pain", the remainder of the songs are still only officially available on this cassette, although the album is widely available on the internet via download.

== Track listing ==
No.	Title	Length
1.	"Saviour for a Day"	4:24
2.	"Who Put the Fear in Here?"	2:53
3.	"Good Pain"	4:38
4.	"Morning Humor"	3:42
5.	"Paper Flowers"	3:48
6.	"The Hands of a Teacher"	3:55
7.	"Sister"	2:55
8.	"Raising a Man"	4:15
9.	"Libra"	2:15
10.	"Ball and Chain"	2:11

== Personnel ==
- Ed Kowalczyk (credited as "Zedd" on the cassette's inlay) – lead vocals, rhythm guitar
- Chad Taylor – lead guitar, backing vocals
- Patrick Dahlheimer – bass
- Chad Gracey – drums
