= Radiant Sea: A Collection of Bootleg Rarities and Two New Songs =

Compilation album by Live
- Released: September 14, 2007
- Genre: Post-grunge
- Length: 49:17
- Label: Action Front Records

Live chronology
Songs from Black Mountain (2006)	Radiant Sea: A Collection of Bootleg Rarities and Two New Songs (2007)	Live at the Paradiso – Amsterdam (2008)

Radiant Sea: A Collection of Bootleg Rarities and Two New Songs is a compilation album from the band Live. Released in 2007, the album features ten live concert recordings of previously released songs, and two studio-recorded songs that were previously unreleased. The disc was only available at Live concerts or from the band's online store at their official website.

== Track listing ==
1. "The Beauty of Gray" – 4:48
2. "Pillar of Davidson" – 6:25
3. "Shit Towne" – 4:26
4. "I Alone" – 6:45
5. "Lakini's Juice" – 5:19
6. "The Distance" – 7:32
7. "The Dolphin's Cry" – 4:40
8. "Nobody Knows" – 4:46
9. "Sweet Release" – 3:14
10. "Overcome" – 4:20
11. "Beautiful Invisible"* – 3:22
12. "Radiant Sea"* – 3:40
