= White, Discussion =

- Dutch commercial single

Single by Live

from the album Throwing Copper
- Released: 1995
- Length: 6:08 (album version); 4:41 (radio edit)
- Label: Radioactive Records
- Songwriter: Live
- Producers: Jerry Harrison; Live

Live singles chronology
"All Over You" (1994)	"White, Discussion" (1995)	"Lakini's Juice" (1997)

"White, Discussion" is a song by the rock group Live, which was released as the fifth and final single from their 1994 album, Throwing Copper.

== Background ==
The 100 Best Selling Albums of the 90s described "White, Discussion" as a "bilious, rage-fueled vision of an apocalyptic dying Earth." The Arizona Republic regarded the lyric as a "compelling torrent of rage against politically correct, do-nothing activism."

In a 1995 interview with the Live e-mail fanzine Straight Outta York, Ed Kowalczyk said that the preacher's voice sampled in the song ("I warned you, I prepared you") was recorded from a shortwave radio station in Colorado.

== Release and reception ==
The song was released as a single in the United States and reached No. 71 on the Billboard Hot 100 Airplay chart, No. 15 on the Modern Rock Tracks chart and No. 12 on the Mainstream Rock Tracks chart. In Canada, "White, Discussion" reached #12 on the RPM Alternative chart.

Billboard called "White, Discussion" an "apocalyptic tale with a killer kiss-off line."

== Track listings ==
All songs written by Live:

Italian single

1. "White, Discussion" (Album Version) – 6:08
2. "Lightning Crashes" (Live) – 6:03
3. "I Alone" (Live) – 4:17
4. "Pain Lies on the Riverside" – 5:11
5. "Operation Spirit (The Tyranny of Tradition)" (Live) – 3:47
6. "The Beauty of Gray" (Live) – 4:30

Australian single

1. "White, Discussion" – 4:41
2. "I Alone" (Acoustic) – 3:48

Netherlands single

1. "White, Discussion" (Sam Sever Remix) – 4:23
2. "White, Discussion" (Live at Glastonbury) – 5:34
3. "White, Discussion" (Album Version) – 6:08

== Charts ==
Chart (1995)	Peak position
Canada Rock/Alternative (RPM)	12
US Radio Songs (Billboard)	71
US Alternative Airplay (Billboard)	15
US Mainstream Rock (Billboard)	12
