= All Over You =

All Over You may refer to:

- All Over You (album), a 1972 album by Chilliwack
- "All Over You" (Level 42 song), 1994
- "All Over You" (Live song), 1994
- "All Over You" (The Spill Canvas song)
