= Run Away (Live song) =

Single by Live

from the album Birds of Pray
- Released: September 29, 2003
- Length: 3:53 (album version); 3:28 (Version with Shelby Lynne)
- Label: Radioactive
- Songwriter: Ed Kowalczyk
- Producer: Jim Wirt

Live singles chronology
"Sweet Release" (2003)	"Run Away" (2003)	"We Deal in Dreams" (2004)

"Run Away" is a song by alternative rock group Live, which was released as a single from their 2003 album, Birds of Pray.

The American release, which was issued only as a single-track radio promo, is a re-recorded version of the song with country music artist Shelby Lynne sharing lead vocals with Ed Kowalczyk. This version was released on Live's greatest hits album Awake: The Best of Live (2004). The other worldwide releases contain the original version of the song.

== Track listings ==
All songs by Ed Kowalczyk, except as noted:

=== Australian and European CD single ===
1. "Run Away" – 3:53
2. "Like I Do" (Live at Vorst Nationaal) (Lyrics: Kowalczyk, Music: Kowalczyk, Dahlheimer, Taylor) – 4:39
3. "They Stood Up for Love" (Live at Vorst Nationaal) – 5:03
4. "Heaven" (Video) – 4:03

=== European CD single 2 ===

1. "Run Away" – 3:53
2. "Run Away" (Tuppin Remix) – 4:01

=== European CD single 3 ===

1. "Run Away" – 3:52
2. "Lighthouse" (Live at Vorst Nationaal) – 3:06
3. "The Beauty of Gray" (Live at Vorst Nationaal) – 4:25
4. "The Beauty of Gray" (Live at Vorst Nationaal) (Video) – 4:31
