= We Deal in Dreams =

Single by Live

from the album Awake: The Best of Live
- Released: October 29, 2004
- Recorded: 1993
- Length: 3:23 (Radio Edit)
- Label: Radioactive Records
- Songwriters: Ed Kowalczyk, Live
- Producers: Jerry Harrison, Live

Live singles chronology
"Run Away" (2004)	"We Deal in Dreams" (2004)	"The River" (2006)

"We Deal in Dreams" is a song by alternative rock group Live, which was released as the only single from their 2004 greatest hits album, Awake: The Best of Live.

The song, while released in 2004, was actually recorded during the sessions for the band's Throwing Copper album, but it did not make the cut and instead was used to promote the Awake: The Best of Live collection.

It was released to radio, but not as a commercial single in the United States and Australia. The commercially purchasable single was released only in Europe.

== Track listing ==
1. "We Deal in Dreams" [Radio Edit] – 3:23
2. "The Dolphin's Cry" (Jet Studio Session) – 5:17
