= Radio Iodine =

American rock band

- Origin: St. Louis, Missouri, U.S.
- Genre: Alternative rock
- Years active: 1993–1998
- Label: Radioactive

Radio Iodine was an American alternative rock band from St. Louis, Missouri. It was formed in 1993 as 9 Days Wonder by Tony Persyn and his wife, Ellen and Drummer Steven “Stitch” Held. After another band threatened to sue over the name, the band changed its name to Radio Iodine. It signed to Radioactive Records, which released a self-titled EP in 1996. Radioactive Records chairman Gary Kurfirst moved the band to his new subsidiary label Radiouniverse, and the band's 1997 album Tiny Warnings was the label's inaugural release.

A midwest tour took the band through the summer of 1997. In the fall of 1997, Tom Bramer quit the band and was replaced by guitarist Mike Speckhard. The band performed its final show at Mississippi Nights in St. Louis on December 12, 1998.

Tony Persyn died on January 12, 2020.

== Former members ==
- Ellen Bledsoe – lead vocals (1993–1998)
- Tony Persyn – bass, programming (1993–1998); died 2020
- Anna DiPiazza – keyboards, backing vocals (1993–1998)
- Tom Bramer – guitars (1993–1997)
- Steven "Stitch" Held – drums (1993–1996)
- Greg Miller – drums (1996–1998)
- Mike Speckhard – guitars (1997–1998)

== Discography ==
Year	Title	Label
1994	Garden of Black Roses (as 9 Days Wonder)	
1996	Radio Iodine (EP)	Radioactive
1997	Tiny Warnings	Radiouniverse/Universal
