= Mental Jewelry =

Studio album by Live
- Released: December 31, 1991
- Recorded: 1991 at D.V. Perversion Room, Milwaukee, Wisconsin
- Genres: Alternative rock, funk rock
- Length: 51:36
- Label: Radioactive
- Producer: Jerry Harrison

Live chronology
| Four Songs (1991) | Mental Jewelry (1991) | Throwing Copper (1994) |

Singles from Mental Jewelry
- 1. "Operation Spirit (The Tyranny of Tradition)" Released: 1992; 2. "Pain Lies on the Riverside" Released: 1992; 3. "The Beauty of Gray" Released: 1992; 4. "Mirror Song" Released: 1992

Professional ratings
Review scores
| Source | Rating |
|---|---|
| AllMusic | 3.5/5 stars |
| The Rolling Stone Album Guide | 2/5 stars |
| Spin Alternative Record Guide | 6/10 |

Mental Jewelry is the second studio album by the band Live—and their first under this name; they had previously released the album The Death of a Dictionary under the name Public Affection, under which they also released the EP Divided Mind, Divided Planet. Released on December 31, 1991, it is also the band's major label debut.

Many of the songs on Mental Jewelry are based on the writings of Indian philosopher Jiddu Krishnamurti. It also showcases their early funk rock leanings, particularly through Patrick Dahlheimer's slap bass playing on songs like "Pain Lies on the Riverside", "Operation Spirit (The Tyranny of Tradition)", and "Waterboy". The album's title comes from a lyric in the track "Mirror Song".

A music video was filmed for "Operation Spirit". The video was filmed when the band were still calling themselves Public Affection.

On June 30, 2017, Live announced a reissue of Mental Jewelry as a two-CD set, with the first CD containing the original album and the three outtakes and the second CD containing a full concert. Cassette and vinyl reissues were also announced.

== Track listing ==
All lyrics are written by Ed Kowalczyk; all music is composed by Live.

| No. | Title | Length |
|---|---|---|
| 1. | "Pain Lies on the Riverside" | 5:11 |
| 2. | "Operation Spirit (The Tyranny of Tradition)" | 3:18 |
| 3. | "The Beauty of Gray" | 4:14 |
| 4. | "Brothers Unaware" | 4:45 |
| 5. | "Tired of 'Me'" | 3:26 |
| 6. | "Mirror Song" | 3:38 |
| 7. | "Waterboy" | 3:07 |
| 8. | "Take My Anthem" | 4:37 |
| 9. | "You Are the World" | 4:23 |
| 10. | "Good Pain" | 5:39 |
| 11. | "Mother Earth Is a Vicious Crowd" | 4:10 |
| 12. | "10,000 Years (Peace Is Now)" | 5:08 |

A track named "Susquehanna" was written during these sessions and often played live during the first few years of Live's career under that name, but not recorded until 1993, during the sessions for the follow-up, Throwing Copper. That version would not be released until the 25th Anniversary reissue edition of that album in 2019, however.

== Personnel ==
Adapted credits from the liner notes of Mental Jewelry.

Live

- Ed Kowalczyk – lead vocals, acoustic guitar
- Chad Taylor – guitar, backing vocals
- Patrick Dahlheimer – bass, backing vocals
- Chad Gracey – drums, percussion, backing vocals

Technical personnel

- Jerry Harrison – producer, mixing
- David Vartanian – engineer, mixing
- Doug McKean – assistant engineer
- Tom Lord-Alge – mixing on "Pain Lies on the Riverside"
- Ted Jensen – mastering
- Gary Kurfirst – executive producer
- Phil Schuster – production coordinator
- Vartan Kurjian and Jonas C. Livingston – art direction
- Julie Carter – sleeve design
- Ron Keith – photography

== Charts ==
=== Album ===
| Chart (1992) | Peak position |
|---|---|
| Australian Albums (ARIA) | 137 |
| US Billboard 200 | 73 |

=== Singles ===
| Single | US Modern Rock (1992) |
|---|---|
| "Operation Spirit (The Tyranny of Tradition)" | 9 |
| "Pain Lies on the Riverside" | 24 |

== Certifications ==
| Region | Certification | Certified units/sales |
|---|---|---|
| Canada (Music Canada) | Gold | 50,000^{^} |
| Netherlands (NVPI) | Gold | 50,000^{^} |
| United States (RIAA) | Platinum | 1,000,000^{^} |
^{^} Shipments figures based on certification alone.
