= Selling the Drama =

1994 single by Live

- US commercial cassette single

Single by Live

from the album Throwing Copper
- B-side: "The Dam at Otter Creek"; "Shit Towne"; "Lightning Crashes"
- Released: May 1994
- Length: 3:27
- Label: Radioactive
- Songwriter: Live
- Producers: Jerry Harrison, Live

Live singles chronology
"Mirror Song" (1992)	"Selling the Drama" (1994)	"I Alone" (1994)

Music videos
- "Selling the Drama" on YouTube

"Selling the Drama" is the first single from American rock band Live's second album, Throwing Copper (1994). It reached number one on the US Billboard Modern Rock Tracks chart, becoming their first of three singles to reach the top of this chart. The song also reached numbers 34 and 43 on the US Cash Box Top 100 and Billboard Hot 100 charts, number 49 in Australia, number 41 in Canada and number 30 in the United Kingdom. It achieved its highest peak in the Netherlands, peaking at number 15 on both the Dutch Top 40 and Single Top 100 charts. Live's performance of "Selling the Drama" at Woodstock '94 was their featured song on the Woodstock 94 double album.

== Background ==
Singer Ed Kowalczyk said the lyrics were initially about "the state of the leader and led", or the ways that political and religious leaders control the public. However, after recording, he realized it also applied to the band's platform to reach audiences through music. Kowalczyk and drummer Chad Gracey both said the song came out very naturally, in about an hour.

== Music video ==
The music video for "Selling the Drama" is set in a wooded area and filmed in both black and white and in color, showing the band playing the song and lead singer Ed Kowalczyk tearing pages out of a book. The video is notable for one of the last appearances of Kowalczyk's long hair, which he shaved off around the time that "I Alone" was released as a single.

== Track listings ==
All songs were written by Live.

US cassette

1. "Selling the Drama" – 3:26
2. "Lightning Crashes" – 5:25

Australian CD

1. "Selling the Drama" – 3:26
2. "The Dam at Otter Creek" – 4:40
3. "Shit Towne" – 3:48

UK CD and cassette

1. "Selling the Drama" – 3:27
2. "Selling the Drama" (acoustic) – 3:40
3. "White, Discussion" – 4:39

UK CD

1. "Selling the Drama" – 3:26
2. "I Alone" (bootleg) – 4:23
3. "Operation Spirit (The Tyranny of Tradition)" (bootleg) – 4:53

UK and European CD

1. "Selling the Drama" – 3:26
2. "The Dam at Otter Creek" (bootleg) – 5:35
3. "Selling the Drama" (bootleg) – 3:35

UK cassette

1. "Selling the Drama" – 3:25
2. "The Dam at Otter Creek" (Bootleg) – 3:35

French CD

1. "Selling the Drama" – 3:27
2. "Selling the Drama" (acoustic) – 3:38

German CD (RAD 31974)

1. "Selling the Drama" – 3:27
2. "Selling the Drama" (acoustic) – 3:40
3. "White, Discussion" (special radio edit) – 4:40

German CD (RAD 32228)

1. "Selling the Drama" – 3:27
2. "Selling the Drama" (acoustic) – 3:38

== Charts ==
=== Weekly charts ===
Chart (1994–1995)	Peak position
Australia (ARIA)	49
Canada Top Singles (RPM)	41
Europe (Eurochart Hot 100)	80
Germany (GfK)	89
Iceland (Íslenski Listinn Topp 40)	22
Netherlands (Dutch Top 40)	15
Netherlands (Single Top 100)	15
Scottish Singles Sales (Official Charts)	30
UK Singles (Official Charts)	30
US Billboard Hot 100	43
US Alternative Airplay (Billboard)	1
US Mainstream Rock Airplay (Billboard)	4
US Pop Airplay (Billboard)	34
US Cash Box Top 100	34

Chart (2025)	Peak position
Russia Streaming (TopHit)	96

=== Monthly charts ===
Chart (2025)	Peak position
Russia Streaming (TopHit)	100

=== Year-end charts ===
Chart (1994)	Position
US Album Rock Tracks (Billboard)	21
US Modern Rock Tracks (Billboard)	6

== Release history ==
Region	Date	Format(s)	Label(s)	Ref.
United States	May 1994	Cassette	Radioactive	
Australia	July 25, 1994	CD; cassette	Radioactive	
United Kingdom	September 26, 1994	CD; cassette	Radioactive	
United Kingdom (re-release)	June 19, 1995	CD; cassette	Radioactive	
