= Alive (Ed Kowalczyk album) =

2010 studio album

Studio album by Ed Kowalczyk
- Released: June 6, 2010
- Recorded: Wire Recording Studios, Austin, Texas
- Genre: Alternative rock, post-grunge hard rock, Christian rock
- Label: Soul Whisper Records / Sony RED Distribution (North America); V2 Records (Europe); Sony Music (Australia / New Zealand)
- Producer: CJ Eiriksson (tracks 1–2, 5–11); Gregg Wattenberg (tracks 3–4)

Ed Kowalczyk chronology
Alive (2010)	The Flood and the Mercy (2013)

Singles from Alive
- 1. "Grace" Released: 2010; 2. "Stand" Released: 2010

Alive is the debut solo album by Ed Kowalczyk, lead singer of the band Live.

== History ==
Kowalczyk entered the studio in early 2010 to record material that he began writing in 2008. He wrote songs for Alive with an acoustic guitar, as he had when he wrote for Live.

The lyrics on Alive feature much religious and spiritual imagery. Kowalczyk's acknowledgement of his faith is much more explicit on this album than it was on his work with Live. The album entered Billboard's Christian albums chart at number six.

The album entered the charts in the Netherlands, debuting at number four on the Dutch albums chart. It has also charted in the United States, Belgium, and Australia.

== Track listing ==
All songs written by Ed Kowalczyk, except where noted

1. "Drive"
2. "The Great Beyond"
3. "Grace" (Kowalczyk, Gregg Wattenberg)
4. "Stand" (Kowalczyk, Wattenberg)
5. "Drink (Everlasting Love)" (Kowalczyk, Chris Daughtry)
6. "Zion"
7. "In Your Light"
8. "Just in Time"
9. "Rome"
10. "Soul Whispers"
11. "Fire on the Mountain"
12. "Eat Your Love" (Dutch bonus track)
13. "A New World" (Dutch bonus track)

== Personnel ==
- Ed Kowalczyk – lead vocals, rhythm guitar
- James Gabbie – lead guitar
- Chris Heerlein – bass
- Ramy Antoun – drums
- Andy Dollerson – keyboards
- Gregg Wattenberg – rhythm guitar on "Grace"

== Reception ==
Professional ratings
Review scores
Source	Rating
About.com	2/5 stars
Allmusic	3/5 stars
The Border Mail	3.5/5 stars
Decoy Music	2/5 stars
Lazyrocker.com	81%
PopMatters	2/10 stars

Alive garnered mixed reviews. Allmusic was positive, giving the album three out of five and saying that Alive features, "The biggest, boldest music he’s made since Throwing Copper, lacking the overheated hard rock poses of Live’s albums immediately following that blockbuster." They conclude that Kowalczyk's, "Unfettered passion and sincerity...burn brighter now that he’s on his own." Decoy Music was less favorable, claiming that the album lacks character, "Each song sounds like he hired some run of the mill group of musicians to come in and play...There's nothing exemplary about the writing, in music or lyrics." They conclude by saying that listeners would only appreciate this album if, "You find yourself happy to take whatever the modern pop-rock stations feed you." Lazyrocker.com gave the album 81 out of 100, describing the album's tracks as, "Energetic, melodic alternative rock songs about faith, love, children and the elements of nature." They conclude a very positive review by saying that, "Ed Kowalczyk made a damn good first solo record, full with new classic rock songs." The Border Mail summarized the album as passionate and asserted that Kowalczyk "doesn’t stray too far from his former band’s signature sound."

Pop Matters was highly critical of the album, claiming that Alive was "an album that deals in a calculated sort of emotional manipulation that comes up short of its targets in every conceivable way." About.com said that the album is, "Filled with lumbering, spiritual-themed songs" and "so unremittingly bombastic that...anyone who isn’t already a sucker for Live’s pseudo-uplifting songs will easily resist Kowalczyk’s barrel-chested fervor." With regard to Kowalczyk's spiritual lyrics, the website bemoans that, "Alive is so relentless in its metaphorical content that it feels like a crutch. Great artists...have made great music about their spiritual struggles, but Kowalczyk can’t seem to express himself without resorting to cliches that fail to dramatize his personal journey of faith."

== Chart performance ==
Chart	Peak
Australian albums chart	42
Dutch albums chart	4
Belgium Flanders albums chart	27
US Billboard 200	166
