= Lightning Crashes =

1994 single by Live

- Artwork for European retail releases

Single by Live

from the album Throwing Copper
- Released: June 26, 1995
- Genre: Alternative rock; post-grunge; pop rock
- Length: 5:25 (album version); 4:24 (edit)
- Label: Radioactive
- Songwriter: Live
- Producers: Jerry Harrison; Live

Live singles chronology
"I Alone" (1994)	"Lightning Crashes" (1995)	"All Over You" (1995)

Music videos
- "Lightning Crashes" on YouTube

"Lightning Crashes" is a song by the American rock band Live. It was serviced to US radio in January 1995 as the third single from their second studio album, Throwing Copper. Although the track was not released as a single in the United States, it received enough radio airplay to peak at No. 12 on the Billboard Hot 100 Airplay chart in 1995. The song also topped the Billboard Album Rock Tracks chart for 10 weeks and the Modern Rock Tracks chart for nine weeks. Internationally, the song reached No. 3 in Canada, No. 8 in Iceland, and No. 13 in Australia.

In 2021, Billboard ranked "Lightning Crashes" as the 70th-biggest hit in the history of the Mainstream Rock chart; the same publication ranked the song as the 22nd-biggest hit in the history of Alternative Airplay two years later.

== Song meaning ==
The band dedicated the song to a high-school friend, Barbara Lewis, who was killed by a drunk driver in 1993. Lead singer Ed Kowalczyk said, "I wrote 'Lightning Crashes' on an acoustic guitar in my brother's bedroom shortly before I had moved out of my parents' house and gotten my first place of my own." Kowalczyk says that the video for "Lightning Crashes" has caused misinterpretations of the song's intent.

While the clip is shot in a home environment, I envisioned it taking place in a hospital, where all these simultaneous deaths and births are going on, one family mourning the loss of a woman while a screaming baby emerges from a young mother in another room. Nobody's dying in the act of childbirth, as some viewers think. What you're seeing is actually a happy ending based on a kind of transference of life.

New York magazine described the band as "deeply mystical" and claimed that the song was, "The story of a...connection between an old lady dying and a new mother at the moment of giving birth." Just a few years before, Kowalczyk discovered the writings of Indian spiritualist Jiddu Krishnamurti, whose philosophy of living life from a place of selflessness and humility influenced the singer's songwriting process, as well as the band's creative philosophy.

== Composition ==
The song is written in the key of B major. The identity of the female backing vocalist remains unknown.

== Track listings ==
All songs were written by Live.

Australian CD single

1. "Lightning Crashes" (edit) – 4:24
2. "The Dam at Otter Creek" (bootleg) – 5:35
3. "Selling the Drama" (bootleg) – 3:35

European CD single

1. "Lightning Crashes" (edit) – 4:26
2. "Lightning Crashes" (live at Glastonbury '95) – 5:21

European maxi-CD single

1. "Lightning Crashes" (edit) – 4:26
2. "Lightning Crashes" (live at Glastonbury '95) – 5:21
3. "The Beauty of Gray" (bootleg, live on tour in late 1994) – 4:43

UK CD1

1. "Lightning Crashes" – 5:25
2. "The Beauty of Gray" (bootleg version, live on tour in late 1994) – 4:44
3. "T.B.D." (acoustic version) – 3:49

UK CD2

1. "Lightning Crashes" – 5:25
2. "Lightning Crashes" (live at Glastonbury '95) – 5:16
3. "White, Discussion" (live at Glastonbury '95) – 5:22

UK cassette single

1. "Lightning Crashes" – 5:25
2. "Lightning Crashes" (live at Glastonbury '95) – 5:16

== Charts ==
=== Weekly charts ===
Weekly chart performance for "Lightning Crashes"
Chart (1994–1995)	Peak position
Australia (ARIA)	13
Canada Top Singles (RPM)	3
Iceland (Íslenski Listinn Topp 40)	8
Netherlands (Dutch Top 40 Tipparade)	13
Quebec Airplay (ADISQ)	45
Scottish Singles Sales (Official Charts)	39
UK Singles (Official Charts)	33
US Radio Songs (Billboard)	12
US Alternative Airplay (Billboard)	1
US Mainstream Rock (Billboard)	1
US Pop Airplay (Billboard)	6

=== Year-end charts ===
Year-end chart performance for "Lightning Crashes"
Chart (1995)	Position
Australia (ARIA)	72
Canada Top Singles (RPM)	31
Iceland (Íslenski Listinn Topp 40)	64
US Hot 100 Airplay (Billboard)	30
US Album Rock Tracks (Billboard)	2
US Modern Rock Tracks (Billboard)	6
US Top 40/Mainstream (Billboard)	22

== Certifications ==
Certifications for "Lightning Crashes"
Region	Certification	Certified units/sales
New Zealand (RMNZ)	3× Platinum	90,000^{‡}
^{‡} Sales+streaming figures based on certification alone.

== Release history ==
Release dates and formats for "Lightning Crashes"
Region	Date	Format(s)	Label(s)	Ref.
United States	January 1995	Radio	Radioactive	
Australia	June 26, 1995	CD	Radioactive	
Europe	June 26, 1995	CD; maxi-CD	Radioactive	
United Kingdom	January 2, 1996	CD	Radioactive	

== In popular culture ==
"Lightning Crashes" was used at the end of episode 3 of Strange Luck, "Last Chance". It was also used at the beginning of the season 4 finale of One Tree Hill, as well as the Yellowjackets episode "Burial". It was featured in the 2017 film Kodachrome and is included as a track on its soundtrack album. The song is also sung by Noah Reid in the second season of Outer Range. In 2023 it was sung by Katie Robertson as Vanessa Latham at her husband's funeral in episode 2 of Australian crime comedy Deadloch.
