= Sarah J. Mahler =

American author and cultural anthropologist

- Born: September 8, 1959 (age 67); York, Pennsylvania
- Occupations: Author, cultural anthropologist
- Known for: Books, cultural anthropology, expert on immigration and transnational migration issues

Sarah J. Mahler (born 1959) is an American author and cultural anthropologist. She was part of a group of anthropologists attempting to change migration studies to a more comprehensive way to understand how migrants crossing international borders remain tied to their homelands and how cultural practices and identities reflect influences from past and present contexts, called "transnational migration."

== Background ==
Sarah J. Mahler was born in York, Pennsylvania but spent most of her formative years in rural upstate New York in the western Catskill Mountains. She earned a bachelor's degree in Liberal Arts from Amherst College in 1982, a year later than her graduating class because after her sophomore year, she took a year leave, moved to Colombia, and immersed herself in a different culture and language.

Upon graduating, she worked in Manhattan for several years before continuing her education at Columbia University, earning a master's degree in Anthropology in 1989, and a Ph.D. in 1992. While in school and living predominantly in Latin American neighborhoods in New York City, she taught English as a second language for free, and became trained in immigration law. During those years she also worked with refugees fleeing violent wars in Central America.

== Career ==
After graduation, Mahler taught at the University of Vermont from 1992 to 1997 in the Anthropology department, and Florida International University from 1997, where she continues to teach courses in the interdisciplinary department of Global and Sociocultural Studies. Her academic expertise is in cultural anthropology and international migration from Latin America and the Caribbean to the United States. She joined a group of anthropologists and other scholars seeking to shift migration studies from just examining immigrants’ lives in their new country to a more comprehensive approach called transnational migration which researches how people who migrate across international borders nonetheless retain ties to their homelands, and how their cultural practices and identities reflect influence from previous and present contexts. Mahler's contributions to this paradigm shift in migration studies have focused on how migrants’ gender relations typically shift, even for family members who themselves do not migrate.

In 2004, Mahler served as director of her department's graduate studies program and in that year she oversaw a major shift in the graduate curriculum. In 2005 she was promoted to Director of the Center for Transnational and Comparative Studies at Florida International University. She served in that capacity in charge of numerous international study programs until 2008 when the center was closed for budgetary reasons. She then embarked on a major shift in her research, returning to an early passion for how people learn the culture that she had wanted to pursue since her daughter Sophia was born.

Since 2008 she has dedicated herself wholly to studying the wide-ranging interdisciplinary literature on the brain and how infants and children learn in general, and how they learn culture in particular. The results of this research are being published (see below).

== Honors and achievements ==
As Central Americans’ story had not been told during the very difficult years of civil wars in the 1980s and early 1990s, Mahler decided to focus her dissertation on highlighting their plight; this was eventually published in two books. The first, American Dreaming: Immigrant Life on the Margins (Princeton 1995) was reviewed by The New York Times, has been used by scores of faculty teaching courses on area studies, and has helped a train a generation of new researchers on immigration. It remains an academic best seller despite being published almost two decades ago.

In 1994, she was awarded a prestigious research fellowship at the Russell Sage Foundation in New York City, one of the country's premier social science fellowships. During her residency, Mahler finished American Dreaming and wrote her second book, Salvadorans in Suburbia: Symbiosis and Conflict.

Due to her work with immigrants and refugees, in 1996 she was honored by the Central American Refugee Center for years of advocacy in defense of human rights.

In 2011, Mahler was awarded the first Provost Award for Graduate Student Mentorship conferred by FIU's Graduate School.

Mahler's next book, Culture as Comfort: The Many Things You Already Know [but might not realize] About Culture, was due to be published by Pearson Education in the summer of 2012. The book is the first step in a larger project aimed at shifting people's everyday understandings of culture toward focusing on how creative and positive we can be culturally, instead of divisive and destructive.

== Personal ==
With her husband, Miguel Marante, Mahler lives a peripatetic life from their RV. Her daughter, Sophia Dominguez-Mahler, is in college. Mahler also has three stepchildren and seven step-grandchildren.

== Selected works ==
=== Peer-reviewed articles and chapters ===
- “So Close and Yet So Far Away: Comparing Leadership Cultivation in Two Cuban Congregations in Miami.” In Stepick, Rey and Mahler, Eds. Churches and Charity in the Immigrant City: Religion, Immigration, and Civic Engagement in Miami. p. 41-71. 2009. Rutgers University Press.
- “Religion, Immigration, and Civic Engagement” Co-authored introduction to Stepick, Rey and Mahler, Eds. Churches and Charity in the Immigrant City: Religion, Immigration, and Civic Engagement in Miami. p. 1-38. 2009. Rutgers University Press.
- “Conclusions: Religious Leadership and Civic Social Capital” Co-authored conclusion to Stepick, Rey and Mahler, Eds. Churches and Charity in the Immigrant City: Religion, Immigration, and Civic Engagement in Miami. p. 250-272. 2009. Rutgers University Press.
- Mahler, Sarah J. and Patricia R. Pessar. “Gender Matters: Ethnographers Bring Gender from the Periphery Toward the Core of Migration Studies.” International Migration Review Vol. 40(1): 28–63. 2006.
- “Toward a Transnationalism of the Middle: How Transnational Religious Practices Help Bridge the Divides Between Cuba and Miami.” Latin American Perspectives Volume 32(1):121-146. 2005.
- “Integrating Technology into a Two Continent Consortium: Lessons Learned.” Peer-Reviewed chapter in Integrating Technology in Higher Education edited by M.O. Thirunarayanan & Aixa Pérez-Prado. University Press of America. 2005.
- Pessar, Patricia and Sarah J. Mahler. “Transnational Migration: Bringing Gender In.” International Migration Review 37(3): 812–846. 2003.
- “Transnational Relationships: The Struggle to Communicate Across Borders,” Identities: Global Studies in Culture and Power 7(4): 583–619. 2001
- Mahler, Sarah J. and Patricia Pessar. “Gendered Geographies of Power: Analyzing Gender across Transnational Spaces,” Introduction to special volume with same title edited with Patricia Pessar for Identities: Global Studies in Culture and Power 7(4):441-459. 2001.
- “Suburban Transmigrants: Long Island’s Salvadorans.” In Hector Cordero-Guzman, Ramon Grosfoguel and Robert Smith, Eds. Migration, Transnationalization, and Ethnic and Racial Dynamics in a Changing New York. Temple University Press. p. 109-130. 2001
- “Constructing International Relations: The Role of Transnational Migrants and Other Non-State Actors.” Identities: Global Studies in Culture and Power Vol. 7:197-232. 2000.
- “Engendering Transnational Migration: A Case Study of Salvadorans.” American Behavioral Scientist 42(4):690-719, January 1999. Reprinted in Gender and Contemporary Immigration edited by Belinda Lum and Pierrette Hondagneu-Sotelo, University of California Press. 2003
- “Vested in Migration: Salvadorans Challenge Restrictionist policies.” In Max Castro, Ed. Free Markets, Open Societies, Closed Borders? Trends in International Migration and Immigration Policy in the Americas. pp. 157–173. Miami: North-South Center Press. 1999
- “Theoretical and Empirical Contributions Toward a Research Agenda for Transnationalism.” In Michael Peter Smith and Luis E. Guarnizo, Eds., Transnationalism from Below. Transaction Publishers. 1998.
- Paul, Shuva, Sarah J. Mahler and Michael Schwartz. “Mass Action and Social Structure”. Political Power and Social Theory 11: 45–99. 1997. Edited Journal Volumes

=== Edited journal volumes ===
- Mahler, Sarah J.; Siemiatycki, Myer (2011). "Diverse Pathways to Immigrant Political Incorporation". American Behavioral Scientist. 55 (9): 1123–1130. doi:10.1177/0002764211407837.
- Identities: Global Studies in Culture and Power 7(4):2001. Co-edited with Patricia Pessar

=== Articles and book chapters ===
- “Team-Based Learning in Social Science Research Methods Classes” in Michaelsen, Larry and Michael S. Sweet Team-Based Learning in the Social Sciences and Humanities Stylus. 2011.
- “Volume Introduction” to Diverse Pathways to Immigrant Political Incorporation: Comparative Canadian and U.S. Perspectives. Special Volume of American Behavioral Scientist. Co-Edited with Myer Siemiatycki; 2011.
- Mahler, Sarah J. “Transnational Migration Comes of Age.” In Ajaya Kumar Sahoo and Brij Maharaj, Eds. Sociology of Diaspora: A Reader Vol. 1: 194–226. 2007
- Mahler, Sarah J. and Dusan Ugrina. “Central America: Crossroads of the Americas.” Feature article in The Migration Information Source. Washington, DC: Migration Policy Institute. ht . 2006.
- Mahler, Sarah J. “Gender Matters [to Remittances].” ID21 Insights Institute of Development Studies, University of Sussex.
- Mahler, Sarah J. and Katrin Hansing. “Myths and Mysticism: How Bringing a Transnational Religious Lens to the Examination of Cuba and the Cuban Diaspora Exposes and Ruptures the Fallacy of Isolation” Chapter in Damián Fernández, ed. Cuba Transnational, University Press of Florida. 2005.
- Hansing, Katrin and Sarah J. Mahler. “God Knows No Borders: Transnational Religious Ties Linking Miami and Cuba”. In Religion, Culture, and Society: The Case of Cuba, edited by M. E. Crahan, pp. 123–130. Woodrow Wilson International Center for Scholars, Washington, DC. 2003
- “Migration and Transnational Issues: Recent Trends and Prospects for 2020.” Report prepared for the Central America 2020 initiative, funded by USAID and the European Union, and administered by the Inter-American Dialogue, Latin American and Caribbean Center at Florida International University, and the Institute for Iberamerican Studies (Hamburg Germany). 2000.
- “La Industria de Remesas Salvadoreña.” In Gail Mummert, Ed., Fronteras Fragmentadas.
- “Teaching Multiculturalism Anthropologically.” In Multicultural Education: A Transdisciplinary Approach. Howard Ball, Mbulelo Mzamane and Steven Berkowitz, Eds. New Jersey: Lawrence Erlbaum Associates. 1998.
- “The Dysfunctions of Transnationalism.” Working Paper #73, Russell Sage Foundation. June 1995.
- “Alternative Enumeration of Undocumented Salvadorans on Long Island.” Final Report to the U.S. Bureau of the Census, Upper Marlboro, MD, January 1993.
- “Dominican Migration to the United States and United States Immigration Policy: A Changing History.” Chapter 1 in Dominicanos Ausentes: Cifras, Politicas, Condiciones Sociales, Santo Domingo, Dominican Republic, 1989
- “The Dynamics of Legalization in New York: A Focus on Dominicans.” Chapter 5 in Dominicanos Ausentes: Cifras, Politicas, Condiciones Sociales, Santo Domingo, Dominican Republic, 1989

== Sources ==
- New York Times Sunday Book Review, American Dreaming: Immigrant Life on the Margins
- Culture as Comfort: The Many Things You Already Know [but might not realize] About Culture . 2012. Pearson Publishing
- Churches and Charity in the Immigrant City: Religion, Immigration, and Civic Engagement in Miami. 2009. Rutgers University Press (co-edited and authored with Alex Stepick and Terry Rey).
- Salvadorans in Suburbia: Symbiosis and Conflict. 1996. Allyn & Bacon (part of New Immigrant Series edited by Nancy Foner).
- American Dreaming: Immigrant Life on the Margins. 1995. Princeton University Press.
