= Lakini's Juice =

1997 single by Live

Single by Live

from the album Secret Samadhi
- B-side: "Supernatural"
- Released: January 20, 1997
- Genre: Alternative rock; post-grunge
- Length: 4:59
- Label: Radioactive
- Songwriter: Live
- Producers: Jay Healy; Live

Live singles chronology
"White, Discussion" (1995)	"Lakini's Juice" (1997)	"Freaks" (1997)

Music video
- "Lakini's Juice" on YouTube

"Lakini's Juice" is a song by alternative rock group Live, which was released as the first single from their 1997 album, Secret Samadhi. The song opens with abrasive staccato guitar and features an orchestra towards the end. There is a constant dissonance running throughout the track. The B-side track "Supernatural" is a live recording, made at "The Academy" in New York City on November 19, 1994; although this particular version was previously unreleased, a different performance of the same song, from the band's appearance on MTV Unplugged, previously appeared on the Vic Chesnutt tribute album Sweet Relief II: Gravity of the Situation in 1996.

"Lakini's Juice" was not released as a single in the United States, but it reached number 35 on the Billboard Hot 100 Airplay chart, number one on the Billboard Modern Rock Tracks chart and number two on the Mainstream Rock Tracks chart. The song also reached number 29 on the UK Singles Chart, the band's highest UK chart position, and became a top-forty hit in Australia, Canada and New Zealand. The music video for the song was directed by Gavin Bowden.

In 2006, Ian Cohen of Stylus Magazine ranked it second in a list of the top ten "momentum-killing follow-up singles to breakthrough post-grunge albums", adding: "While their previous hits relied on collegial strum & jangle, Chad Taylor put on his dunce cap and came up with a blockhead chord riff that never sounds right. Caught up in the 'rock' moment, Ed Kowalczyk's tries to conquer atonalism with volume. And to top it off, the video likens sexual conquest to the deli line."

== Track listings ==
All songs were written by Live except "Supernatural", written by Vic Chesnutt.

European CD single

1. "Lakini's Juice" – 5:02
2. "Pain Lies on the Riverside" (club mix) – 6:01
3. "Selling the Drama" (acoustic) – 3:38

European limited-edition 7-inch single

Individually numbered and pressed on silver vinyl

1. "Lakini's Juice" – 5:02
2. "Supernatural" (live) – 3:26

Netherlands CD single

1. "Lakini's Juice" – 5:01
2. "White, Discussion" (Sam Sever remix) – 4:23

Australian single

1. "Lakini's Juice" – 5:02
2. "White, Discussion" (Sam Sever remix) – 4:23
3. "Supernatural" (live) – 3:26

== Charts ==
=== Weekly charts ===
Chart (1997)	Peak position
Australia (ARIA)	21
Canada Top Singles (RPM)	20
Canada Rock/Alternative (RPM)	1
Netherlands (Dutch Top 40 Tipparade)	8
Netherlands (Single Top 100)	69
New Zealand (Recorded Music NZ)	37
Scottish Singles Sales (Official Charts)	20
UK Singles (Official Charts)	29
UK Rock & Metal (Official Charts)	1
US Radio Songs (Billboard)	35
US Alternative Airplay (Billboard)	1
US Mainstream Rock (Billboard)	2

=== Year-end charts ===
Chart (1997)	Position
Canada Rock/Alternative (RPM)	9
US Mainstream Rock Tracks (Billboard)	6
US Modern Rock Tracks (Billboard)	16

== Release history ==
Region	Date	Format(s)	Label(s)	Ref.
United States	January 20, 1997	Alternative radio	Radioactive	
Europe	January 27, 1997	CD	Radioactive	
Japan	February 21, 1997	CD	Radioactive	
United Kingdom	March 3, 1997	7-inch vinyl; CD	Radioactive	
