= I Alone =

1994 single by Live

Single by Live

from the album Throwing Copper
- B-side: "Pain Lies on the Riverside"; "Selling the Drama" (acoustic)
- Released: December 1994
- Genre: Post-grunge
- Length: 3:48
- Label: Radioactive
- Songwriter: Live
- Producers: Jerry Harrison; Live

Live singles chronology
"Selling the Drama" (1994)	"I Alone" (1994)	"Lightning Crashes" (1994)

Music videos
- "I Alone" on YouTube

"I Alone" is the second single from the American rock band Live's third studio album, Throwing Copper (1994). The single was serviced to radio stations in Canada and the United States in August 1994 but was only released commercially overseas in December. "I Alone" reached No. 6 on the US Billboard Modern Rock Tracks chart and number 59 on the US Cash Box Top 100. In 2007, it was ranked 62nd-best song of the 1990s by VH1. Live performed "I Alone" at the Woodstock '99 festival on July 23, 1999, in Rome, New York.

== Composition ==
"I Alone" is written in the key of G major (recorded a half step lower in G♭ major). Kowalczyk's vocal range spans from C♯^{3}-G^{4}. Lead singer Ed Kowalczyk said of the song's lyrics, "People think 'I Alone' is a love song but it really wasn't. The lyrics were more abstract, encompassing a much larger message." He explained the line, "The greatest of teachers won't hesitate to leave you there by yourself chained to fate," by saying that a profound lesson he derived from studying spiritual teachings was that religion and truth must be found for oneself and practiced, rather than just accepting the word of others.

== Track listings ==
All songs were written by Live.

Australian release

1. "I Alone"
2. "Pain Lies on the Riverside"
3. "Selling the Drama" (acoustic)

UK and German releases

1. "I Alone" – 3:51
2. "I Alone" (acoustic) – 3:47
3. "Pain Lies on the Riverside" – 5:10

== Charts ==
=== Weekly charts ===
Chart (1994–1995)	Peak position
Australia (ARIA)	97
Iceland (Íslenski Listinn Topp 40)	15
Netherlands (Dutch Top 40)	22
Netherlands (Single Top 100)	20
Scottish Singles Sales (Official Charts)	42
UK Singles (Official Charts)	48
UK Rock & Metal (Official Charts)	8
US Radio Songs (Billboard)	38
US Alternative Airplay (Billboard)	6
US Mainstream Rock Airplay (Billboard)	6
US Cash Box Top 100	59

=== Year-end charts ===
Chart (1994)	Position
US Modern Rock Tracks (Billboard)	26

Chart (1995)	Position
US Album Rock Tracks (Billboard)	39

== Release history ==
Region	Date	Format(s)	Label(s)	Ref.
United States	August 1994	Radio	Radioactive	
Europe	December 1994	CD	Radioactive	
United Kingdom	February 6, 1995	7-inch vinyl; CD; cassette	Radioactive	
