= All Over You (Live song) =

Single by Live

from the album Throwing Copper
- Released: September 18, 1995
- Length: 4:01
- Label: Radioactive
- Songwriter: Live
- Producers: Jerry Harrison, Live

Live singles chronology
"Lightning Crashes" (1994)	"All Over You" (1995)	"White, Discussion" (1995)

Alternative covers
- UK CD2

"All Over You" is a song by American rock band Live, from their 1994 album Throwing Copper.

The song was never released as a single in the US, but it reached No. 33 on the Billboard Hot 100 Airplay chart and No. 1 on Billboard's Recurrent Airplay chart. It also charted at No. 4 on the Billboard Modern Rock Tracks and No. 2 on the Mainstream Rock Tracks chart.

The live B-sides were recorded at the 1995 Glastonbury Festival, with the exception of "Waitress", which was recorded at the Swedish Broadcasting Corporation in Stockholm on June 9, 1995. "All Over You" appeared in "Syzygy", the episode of The X-Files that aired January 26, 1996.

== Composition ==
The song "All Over You" was composed in the key of C-sharp major with recommended tempo of 125 bpm.

== Charts ==
=== Weekly charts ===
Weekly chart performance for "All Over You"
Chart (1995–1996)	Peak position
Australia (ARIA)	52
Canada Top Singles (RPM)	18
Canada Rock/Alternative (RPM)	3
Iceland (Íslenski Listinn Topp 40)	7
Netherlands (Dutch Top 40 Tipparade)	11
Scottish Singles Sales (Official Charts)	46
UK Singles (Official Charts)	48
US Radio Songs (Billboard)	33
US Alternative Airplay (Billboard)	4
US Mainstream Rock (Billboard)	2

=== Year-end charts ===
Year-end chart performance for "All Over You"
Chart (1995)	Rank
Canada Rock/Alternative (RPM)	9
Iceland (Íslenski Listinn Topp 40)	69
US Hot 100 Airplay (Billboard)	66
US Album Rock Tracks (Billboard)	7
US Modern Rock Tracks (Billboard)	9

== Track listings ==
All songs written by Live:

=== Australian and European single ===
1. "All Over You" – 4:01
2. "Shit Towne" (Live Version) – 4:34
3. "Iris" (Live Version) – 4:04
4. "All Over You" (Live Version) – 4:14

=== UK CD single 1 (RAXTD 20) ===
1. "All Over You" – 4:01
2. "Shit Towne" (Live Version) – 4:34
3. "All Over You" (Live Version) – 4:14

=== UK CD single 2 (RAXXD 20) ===
1. "All Over You" – 4:01
2. "Waitress" (Live Version) – 4:12
3. "Iris" (Live Version) – 4:04

=== UK cassette single ===
1. "All Over You" – 4:01
2. "Shit Towne" (Live Version) – 4:28
