= Live (band) =

American rock band

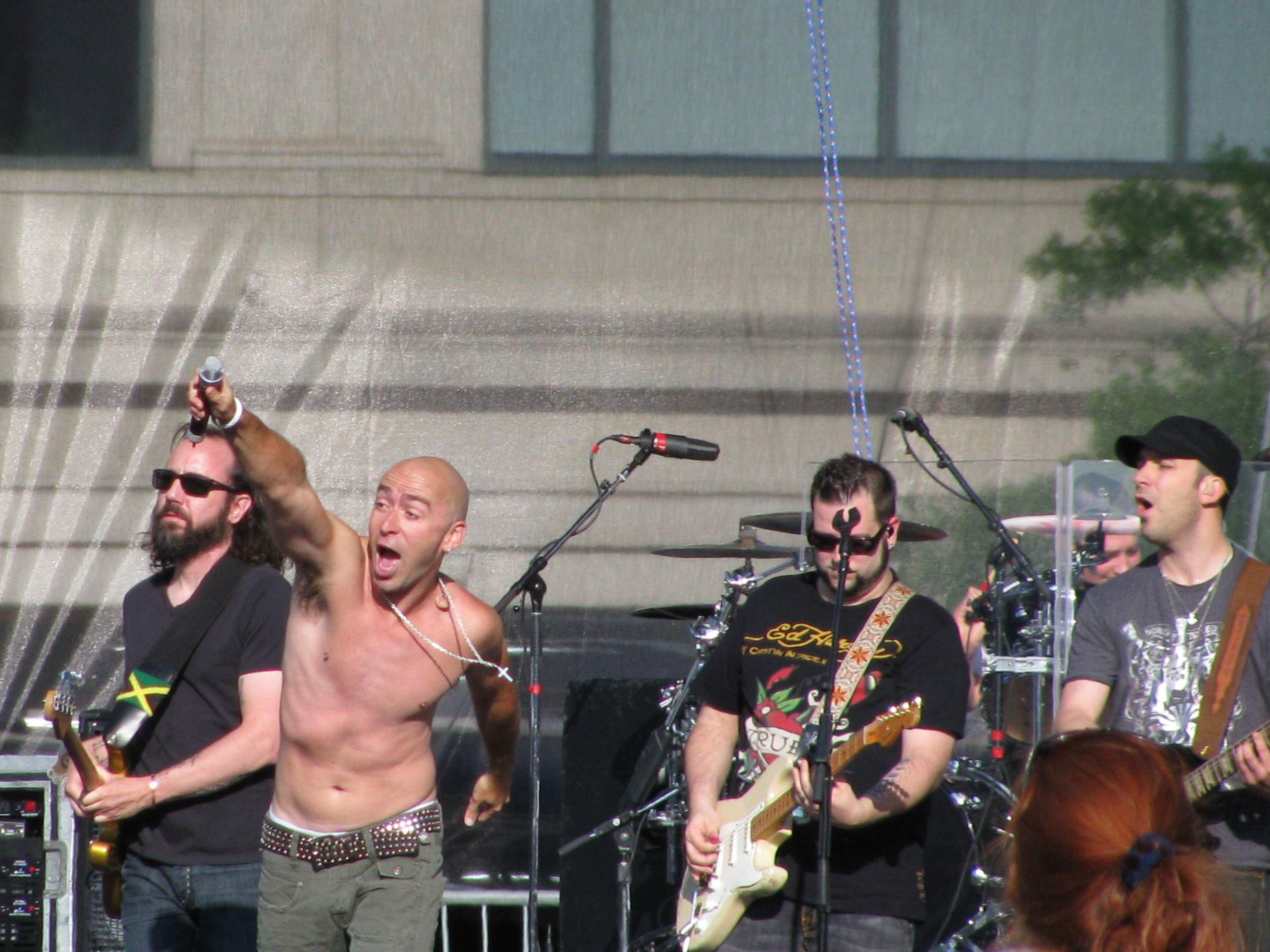
- Live performing in 2008. L–R: Patrick Dahlheimer, Ed Kowalczyk, Chad Taylor, Chad Gracey (in background), and Adam Kowalczyk

Background information
- Also known as: Public Affection (1987–1991) +LIVE+ (2026)
- Origin: York, Pennsylvania, U.S.
- Genres: Alternative rock; post-grunge; hard rock
- Years active: 1984–2009; 2012–present
- Labels: Sony BMG; Epic; Radioactive
- Spinoffs: The Gracious Few
- Members: Ed Kowalczyk
- Past members: Chris Shinn; Chad Taylor; Patrick Dahlheimer; Chad Gracey
- Website: livetheband.com

Live /laɪv/, often typeset as Līve, LĪVE, or +LĪVE+, is an American rock band formed in York, Pennsylvania, in 1984 by Ed Kowalczyk (lead vocals, guitars), Patrick Dahlheimer (bass), Chad Gracey (drums), and Chad Taylor (guitars).

Live earned early fame for their single "Operation Spirit (The Tyranny of Tradition)", whose video received airtime on MTV. Their second album, Mental Jewelry, released in 1991, enjoyed modest sales. Their biggest success came in 1994 with their third album, Throwing Copper, which sold eight million copies in the U.S. The band had a string of hit singles in the mid-1990s, including "Lightning Crashes", which stayed at the top of the Billboard Hot Mainstream Rock Tracks chart for ten consecutive weeks and the Modern Rock Tracks (now Alternative Songs) chart for nine weeks from February 25 to April 22, 1995. The band has sold over twenty million albums worldwide.

When touring, Live has used additional musicians, including Kowalczyk's younger brother Adam, British keyboardist Michael "Railo" Railton, rhythm guitarist Christopher Thorn of Blind Melon, and guitarist Zak Loy of Alpha Rev.

In 2009, Kowalczyk left the band; he was replaced by singer Chris Shinn and the band released the album The Turn in October 2014. Kowalczyk rejoined Live in December 2016 and in 2018, they released a new EP, Local 717. In June 2022, Kowalczyk fired Taylor after taking majority control of the band. Gracey and Dahlheimer were also let go shortly after. Kowalczyk is the only remaining member of the original lineup and has been performing and recording as Live with other musicians as of October 2022. In November 2022, it was reported that Gracey filed a lawsuit against Taylor and Dahlheimer as managers of their company, ThinkLoud. In February 2026, Taylor and Gracey issued a cease and desist letter to Kowalczyk, asserting that he no longer had rights to use the band's trademarks and demanding that he stop using them for touring and other commercial activities. Kowalczyk has continued performing since the revocation, re-branding the act as +LIVE+, while his attorney has disputed the claims and stated that they will be addressed in court.

== History ==
=== The Death of a Dictionary and Mental Jewelry: 1984–1992 ===
Live started in the early 1980s under the name First Aid, as a trio of Taylor, Dahlheimer, and Gracey. Kowalczyk joined in 1984, when the group lost a talent show. They went through various different names, including Action Front, Paisley Blues, and Club Fungus, before settling on Public Affection in January 1987. Gracey picked the name based on a comment by his girlfriend at the time. When the band graduated from high school, they recorded a self-released cassette of original songs, titled The Death of a Dictionary, in 1989. In 1990, they released an EP of demos produced by Jay Healy, titled Divided Mind, Divided Planet, via their "Black Coffee" mailing list. They played regular concerts at CBGB in New York City, which helped earn them a contract with Radioactive Records in 1991. In June of that year, the band changed its name to Live.

Under the new name, the band entered the studio with producer Jerry Harrison (of Talking Heads) and recorded the EP Four Songs. The single "Operation Spirit (The Tyranny of Tradition)" reached number nine on the Modern Rock chart and was followed by their debut album, 1991's Mental Jewelry, which Harrison again produced. Pat Dalheimer said, "So important to have somebody else in the room to help us, especially with arrangements. I mean, we were still learning how to write songs...Jerry just seemed to know everything...this guy's a wizard!" Some of the album's lyrics, written by Kowalczyk, were inspired by Indian philosopher and writer Jiddu Krishnamurti.

=== Throwing Copper: 1993–1996 ===
After appearances on the MTV 120 Minutes tour, at Woodstock '94, and on Peter Gabriel's WOMAD tour, the band's third album, Throwing Copper, achieved mainstream success. The record featured the singles "I Alone", "All Over You", and the number-one US Modern Rock hits "Selling the Drama" and "Lightning Crashes". "Lightning Crashes" also stayed at the top of the Billboard Hot Mainstream Rock Tracks chart for ten consecutive weeks. The band appeared on NBC's Saturday Night Live, where they played "I Alone" and "Selling the Drama", and they performed for the first time in the UK, on The Word.

The success of these singles eventually gained Throwing Copper the number one position on the Billboard 200 album chart on May 6, 1995, its 52nd week on the chart. It was the third longest gap between an album first charting and reaching number one, behind Fleetwood Mac's eponymous album in 1976 (58 weeks) and Paula Abdul's Forever Your Girl in 1989 (64 weeks). It is Live's best-selling album to date, having sold eight million copies in the US alone.

=== Secret Samadhi and The Distance to Here: 1997–2000 ===
Ed Kowalczyk discussing The Distance to Here in 2000

The success of Throwing Copper helped 1997's Secret Samadhi (co-produced by the band and Jay Healy) to reach the number one position in its debut on the US album chart. It took its name from Samadhi, a state of Hindu meditation. The album contained four Modern Rock hit singles, but failed to match its predecessor's success, with sales reaching two million. The band performed "Lakini's Juice" and "Heropsychodreamer" from the album on Saturday Night Live.

Jerry Harrison returned as co-producer for 1999's The Distance to Here, which entered the US album chart at number four and featured the hit single "The Dolphin's Cry". In 2000, Live embarked on a co-headlining tour with Counting Crows. On that tour, Counting Crows' lead singer, Adam Duritz, often joined Live for their performance of "The Dolphin's Cry", while Kowalczyk sang a verse of "Hanginaround" with Counting Crows.

=== V, Birds of Pray, and Awake: The Best of Live: 2001–2004 ===
On September 18, 2001, the experimental V (originally to be called Ecstatic Fanatic) was released to mixed reviews. The first single was "Simple Creed", which featured a rap by Tricky, but the events of 9/11, which occurred a week before V was released, meant that the melancholic "Overcome" received significant airplay and became the album's selling point. V reached number 22 in the US. Also in 2001, Live contributed a live version of the song "I Alone" to the charity album Live in the X Lounge IV.

In May 2003, the band released the Jim Wirt-produced Birds of Pray, which reached number 28 on the US album chart, boosted by the unexpected success of the single "Heaven", Live's first U.S. Hot 100 hit single since "The Dolphin's Cry".

In November 2004, Live released a greatest hits compilation, Awake: The Best of Live. Awake included "We Deal in Dreams", a previously unreleased song from the Throwing Copper sessions, a cover version of Johnny Cash's "I Walk the Line", and a new version of their song "Run Away", with Shelby Lynne sharing lead vocals with Kowalczyk. A deluxe version of the album included a DVD with 22 music videos and an interview with Kowalczyk.

=== Songs from Black Mountain, Radiant Sea, and live DVD: 2005–2008 ===
In 2005, Live signed to Sony BMG Music Entertainment's Epic label. They released the album Songs from Black Mountain in June 2006. The record peaked at number 52 on the Billboard 200 album chart, and reached number three on the Billboard Independent album chart. The first single was "The River".

On season five of American Idol, finalist Chris Daughtry was accused of performing Live's version of Johnny Cash's "I Walk the Line" and claiming it as his own interpretation. A week later, Daughtry acknowledged this was true and said that Live was one of his favorite bands. In May 2006, Live appeared on The Howard Stern Show to address this issue. On August 2, 2008, Daughtry and Live performed the band's interpretation of "I Walk the Line" together at the Toms River Fest in Toms River, New Jersey.

On September 14, 2007, Live released Radiant Sea: A Collection of Bootleg Rarities and Two New Songs, their first album since 1989 on their own Action Front Records label. The new songs were "Beautiful Invisible" and "Radiant Sea". Live recorded their first concert DVD in the Netherlands during two shows at the Paradiso on June 30 and July 1, 2008. Live at the Paradiso – Amsterdam was released on November 11, 2008, on DVD and CD. Also in 2008, the band headlined a US tour that also featured Blues Traveler and Collective Soul.

A previously unreleased Live song, "Hold Me Up", features in the 2008 Kevin Smith film Zack and Miri Make a Porno. Smith said, "I first heard (the song) in '95 when we were putting together the Mallrats soundtrack. It was actually in the film for the first test screening, but Live decided they wanted to hold onto it as a potential single off their next album ... When I was editing Jay and Silent Bob Strike Back ... I put in a request for it...again, I was denied. Third time, apparently, was the charm. Needed a song for that sequence in Zack and Miri and remembered the Live track. This time, the band signed off on us using the track. Took 13 years, but was worth the wait!" In spite of Smith's endorsement, the song does not appear on the movie's soundtrack album.

=== Kowalczyk's departure, the Gracious Few, and The Turn: 2009–2015 ===
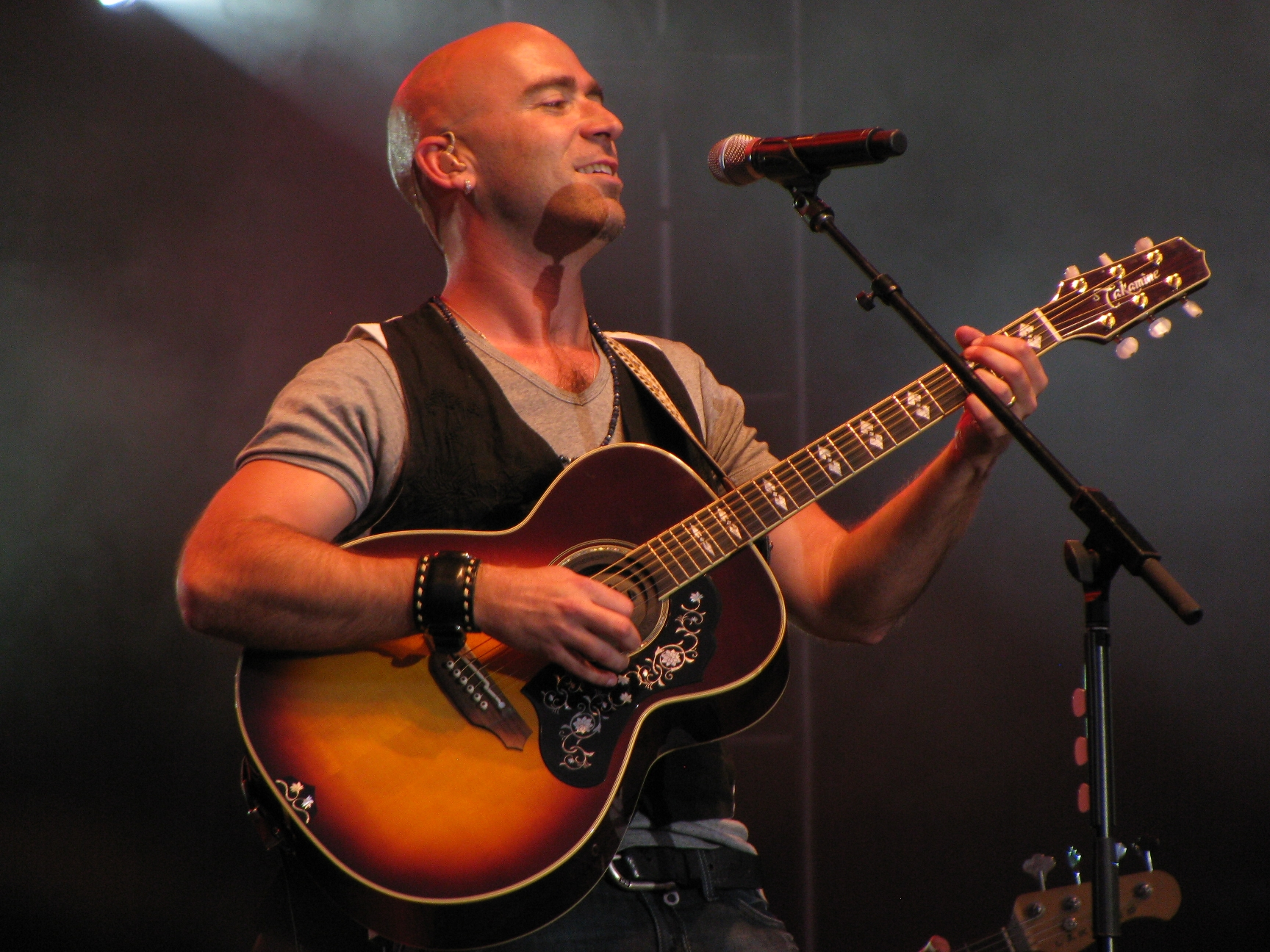
Ed Kowalczyk in 2009

After a concert in July 2009, Live announced that the band would take a two-year hiatus to work on other projects. Kowalczyk recorded his solo album Alive, and the other band members formed a group with Kevin Martin and Sean Hennesy of Candlebox, called The Gracious Few. That band proceeded to record a self-titled debut album in California for release in September 2010. On November 30, 2009, Taylor revealed in a blog post that the "hiatus" could become a permanent split, and if the band were to reunite, Kowalczyk would not be included; he and the other members of Live accused Kowalczyk of unreasonable demands in contract and salary negotiations.

On June 8, 2011, Taylor revealed that he, Dahlheimer, and Gracey would restart the band without Kowalczyk. He made no mention of any new lead singer, but said, "We'll have to begin addressing the hole left by our singer's departure". He added that, "I need to feel Live once again without the constraints that were placed on it over the last few years. Chad [Gracey], Patrick, and I invested most of our lives to writing, recording, and performing the songs of Live. We deserve a chance to reconnect with the fans to say goodbye to the old era and hello to the new." Kowalczyk disapproved of their decision. He complained that "they obfuscate that it's not the real band. They don't say that it's not the original lineup. They just kind of go out and surprise people, and it's really sort of lame".

On January 24, 2012, Taylor, Dahlheimer, and Gracey announced that they were leading members in a project to renovate a four-story building at 210 York Street in York. The building housed a technology company, creating sixty new jobs. It also included a brand new recording studio.

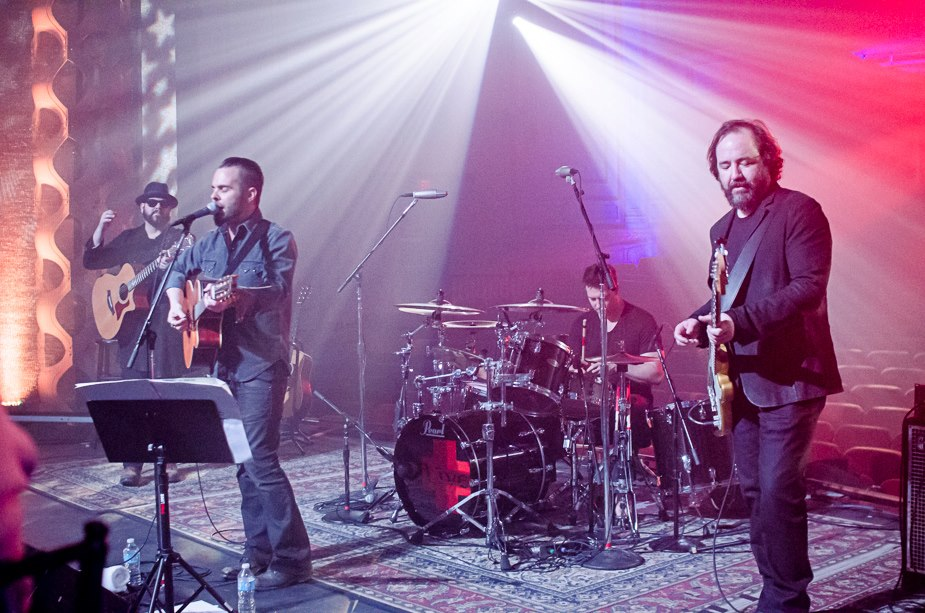
Live with Chris Shinn in 2013

Live returned from their nearly three-year hiatus on March 12, 2012, with Chris Shinn, formerly of Unified Theory, as their new lead singer. The new lineup performed before an invited audience at the Strand-Capitol Performing Arts Center in York. They performed with new touring members, including Gracious Few bandmate Sean Hennesy on rhythm guitar and Alexander Lefever on keyboards. In July 2012, Action Front Unlimited, Inc., a company co-founded by Taylor, Gracey, and Dahlheimer to handle Live's trademarks and intellectual property, commenced more legal proceedings against Kowalczyk for misuse of the band's name while promoting his live performances. Live's first major tour with Shinn was as part of the Summerland Tour 2013, playing 35 shows across the US. Other featured bands were Everclear, Filter, and Sponge.

Live's first album to feature Shinn, The Turn, was released on October 28, 2014. The record's first single, "The Way Around Is Through", was uploaded to YouTube on September 10, 2014, and officially released on September 16.

During 2014–2015, Kowalczyk embarked on a worldwide tour, playing acoustic "unplugged" shows celebrating the twentieth anniversary of the release of Throwing Copper. Zak Loy accompanied Kowalczyk on this tour, playing guitar, mandolin, pedal steel, and singing backing vocals.

=== Kowalczyk's return and takeover; dispute over name ownership: 2016–present ===
On October 24, 2016, Chad Taylor and Ed Kowalczyk, along with singer Zoe LaBelle, took part in an interview for WVYC. Although the primary reason for the interview was to promote new music by LaBelle that Taylor had worked on, it marked the first time that the two former bandmates had publicly appeared together since 2009. Fueling speculation over a possible reunion, the Live Facebook page returned on November 16, 2016, with an early picture of the band's original lineup and a new logo. On the same day, Ed Kowalczyk's Facebook page was also updated with a new profile picture and cover photo, both displaying the same logo from the band's page. Despite the changes on Facebook, Live's website remained black until December 9, when a countdown was posted suggesting new information would be released on December 12. Later that day, Live's Twitter and Facebook pages announced that the band's original lineup had reunited with tour dates in 2017. In autumn 2018, they released the singles "Love Lounge" and "Be a Giver, Man". On October 12, they released the EP Local 717.

On June 21, 2022, Kowalczyk announced that Chad Taylor had been fired from the band the day before. Gracey tweeted: "For anyone interested...Ed is not the problem in this band...and it's not this Chad...and he doesn't play bass. We have among us a person that stirs and then, no pun intended, sells drama."

In September 2022, Kowalczyk announced that he would be touring as Live without Dahlheimer or Gracey. In a November 2022 interview with Rolling Stone magazine, former lead singer Chris Shinn confirmed that Dahlheimer and Gracey had been let go as well, leaving Kowalczyk as the only original member left in the band.

In November 2022, it was reported that Gracey filed a lawsuit against Taylor and Dahlheimer as managers of their company, ThinkLoud. Gracey cited counts of breach of fiduciary duty and breach of contract. Also that month, former business partner Bill Hynes filed a civil lawsuit against Taylor, Gracey, and Dahlheimer, seeking hundreds of thousands of dollars he had allegedly loaned to each of them. This latter suit was settled in July 2025.

In February 2023, Rolling Stone released a detailed article on the discord within the band, mostly focusing on the issues between Chad Taylor and Hynes. Immediately after the article's publication, Hynes sued Taylor for defamation. In August 2023, the Pennsylvania State Police charged Hynes with two felonies involving theft of nearly $4.4 million from the band's business and its primary investor, though Hynes and the investor's attorney claim that a settlement had been reached over such issues in August 2022. Taylor and Hynes settled their lawsuit in March 2025, under undisclosed terms. In a March 2025 affidavit, Taylor stated, "Many of the implications and quotations contained in this article were based on my limited knowledge at that time, and I have subsequently learned through discovery that many of my impressions were not complete."

In September 2023, Live announced a co-headlining tour of Australia with Incubus for April 2024, marking the first time the two bands have toured together. On August 16, 2024, the band released the song "Lady Bhang (She Got Me Rollin)", which also features a guest appearance by Dean DeLeo of Stone Temple Pilots.

In February 2026, Taylor and Gracey issued a cease and desist letter to Kowalczyk, asserting that his rights to use the band's name had been revoked by Action Front Unlimited, Inc. and demanding he stop using it for touring and other commercial activities. Kowalczyk disputed the claims, with his attorney stating they are "without merit" and indicating the matter would be resolved through legal action. Despite the cease and desist, Kowalczyk proceeded with a previously planned Canadian tour under the rebranded name +LIVE+.

== Band members ==
Current members

- Ed Kowalczyk – lead vocals, rhythm guitar (1989–2009, 2016–present)

Touring musicians

- Zak Loy – lead guitar, backing vocals (2022–present), rhythm guitar (2016–2022)
- Chris Heerlein – bass (2022–present)
- Johnny Radelat – drums (2024–present)
- Nick Jay – keyboards (2024–present)

Past members

- Chad Taylor – lead guitar, backing vocals (1989–2009, 2012–2022)
- Patrick Dahlheimer – bass (1989–2009, 2012–2022)
- Chad Gracey – drums (1989–2009, 2012–2022)
- Chris Shinn – lead vocals, rhythm guitar (2012–2016)

Past touring musicians

- Christopher Thorn – rhythm guitar (1998)
- Adam Kowalczyk – rhythm guitar, backing vocals (1999–2009)
- Michael "Railo" Railton – keyboards (1999–2002, 2008)
- Sean Hennesy – rhythm guitar (2012)
- Alexander Lefever – keyboards (2012)
- Clint Simmons – percussion (2019–2022)
- Robin Diaz – drums (2017–2019, 2022–2024)

Timeline

== Discography ==
- The Death of a Dictionary (1989) (Note: Released under the name Public Affection)
- Mental Jewelry (1991)
- Throwing Copper (1994)
- Secret Samadhi (1997)
- The Distance to Here (1999)
- V (2001)
- Birds of Pray (2003)
- Songs from Black Mountain (2006)
- The Turn (2014)

== See also ==
- List of alternative rock artists
- List of artists who reached number one on the U.S. alternative rock chart
- List of artists who reached number one on the U.S. Mainstream Rock chart
- List of Epic Records artists
- List of hard rock musicians
- List of post-grunge bands
