= Throwing Copper =

1994 album by Live

Studio album by Live
- Released: April 26, 1994
- Recorded: July–September 1993
- Studio: Pachyderm (Cannon Falls, Minnesota)
- Genres: Alternative rock; post-grunge
- Length: 59:32
- Label: Radioactive
- Producers: Jerry Harrison; Live

Live chronology
| Mental Jewelry (1991) | Throwing Copper (1994) | Secret Samadhi (1997) |

Singles from Throwing Copper
- 1. "Selling the Drama" Released: May 1994; 2. "I Alone" Released: December 1994; 3. "Lightning Crashes" Released: June 1995; 4. "All Over You" Released: September 1995; 5. "White, Discussion" Released: 1995

Throwing Copper is the second studio album by American alternative rock band Live, released on April 26, 1994, on former MCA Records subsidiary Radioactive Records. It was produced by Jerry Harrison of Talking Heads and was recorded at Pachyderm Recording Studio. Throwing Copper has generally been regarded as Live's best album, and is also their most commercially successful having sold over 8 million copies and certified 8× platinum by the Recording Industry Association of America.

== Cover art ==
The cover art is a painting by Scottish artist Peter Howson titled Sisters of Mercy. On September 23, 2005, it was sold for $186,000 by Christie's in New York. The painting is oil on canvas and measures 243 by 182 centimetres (7.97 ft × 5.97 ft).

== 25th anniversary reissue ==
In May 2019, the band announced a 25th-anniversary reissue of Throwing Copper, which was released on July 19. The reissue contains three bonus tracks: "Hold Me Up", which was recorded during the original Throwing Copper sessions and later heard in the 2008 comedy Zack and Miri Make a Porno but was not officially released; "We Deal in Dreams", which had been released as a single off the band's 2004 compilation album Awake: The Best of Live; and "Susquehanna", another previously unreleased track originally recorded in 1993, though it had been written during recording sessions for the band's first studio album, Mental Jewelry.

== Critical reception ==
Professional ratings
Review scores
| Source | Rating |
|---|---|
| AllMusic | 4.5/5 stars |
| Classic Rock | 4/5 stars |
| The Encyclopedia of Popular Music | 4/5 stars |
| The Great Rock Discography | 7/10 |
| MusicHound Rock | 4/5 stars |
| Q | 4/5 stars |
| Rolling Stone | 4/5 stars |
| The Rolling Stone Album Guide | 4/5 stars |
| Spin Alternative Record Guide | 7/10 |
| The Village Voice | C+ |

Throwing Copper has typically been regarded as Live's strongest album. A Rolling Stone review stated that the band "strive for an epic sound" and successfully execute on that goal; retrospective reviews have been similarly positive, with the Jakarta Post describing the album as "a solid beast from front to back" and uDiscoverMusic characterizing it as "challenging, yet commendably powerful". The instrumentation on the album has been generally praised: Rolling Stone considered the musicians to be "expert players [who] drop musical smart bombs with unerring precision", and the Jakarta Post referred to the music as "absolutely dynamic and catchy". Singer Ed Kowalczyk was applauded for his vocal performance as well, with a retrospective Stereogum review noting his ability to "raise his voice from a plaintive hush to a clenched roar".

The lyrics of the album received more mixed reviews. The Jakarta Post felt that Throwing Copper "managed to push earnestness and wild esotericism as far as it could go without feeling resoundingly cheesy", but Gina Boldman of AllMusic was more negative, stating that the album's "melodrama [is] a bit much". Stereogum described Kowalczyk's lyrics as "mystic gibberish" that nevertheless featured "memorably inscrutable turns of phrase".

A 2024 review by Paolo Ragusa of Consequence of Sound credits this album with starting post-grunge and shifting rock music to a new direction after the death of Kurt Cobain by combining some harder rock influences with clearer vocals, softer guitar melodies, and the production of Jerry Harrison to make a distinct sound.

== Track listing ==
All lyrics are written by Ed Kowalczyk; all music is composed by Live.

Original compact disc issue
| No. | Title | Length |
|---|---|---|
| 1. | "The Dam at Otter Creek" | 4:43 |
| 2. | "Selling the Drama" | 3:26 |
| 3. | "I Alone" | 3:50 |
| 4. | "Iris" | 3:59 |
| 5. | "Lightning Crashes" | 5:25 |
| 6. | "Top" | 2:42 |
| 7. | "All Over You" | 3:59 |
| 8. | "Shit Towne" | 3:48 |
| 9. | "T.B.D." | 4:28 |
| 10. | "Stage" | 3:08 |
| 11. | "Waitress" | 2:49 |
| 12. | "Pillar of Davidson" ( (Note: "Pillar of Davidson" was not included on the original 1994 vinyl version.)) | 6:46 |
| 13. | "White, Discussion" | 6:08 |
| 14. | "Horse" (unlisted track (Note: "Horse" was an unlisted track on the 1994 releases. It was not included on the original 1994 vinyl version, but the 2012 reissue added "Horse" as a listed track on the D-side.)) | 4:16 |

Europe and Australia Two CD set Four Songs
| No. | Title | Length |
|---|---|---|
| 1. | "Operation Spirit" | 3:19 |
| 2. | "Good Pain" | 5:39 |
| 3. | "Heaven Wore a Shirt" | 3:38 |
| 4. | "Negation" | 3:37 |

25th anniversary reissue bonus tracks
| No. | Title | Length |
|---|---|---|
| 15. | "Hold Me Up" (from the film Zack and Miri Make a Porno, previously unreleased) |
| 16. | "We Deal in Dreams" (previously released on Awake: The Best of Live) |
| 17. | "Susquehanna" (previously unreleased) |

25th anniversary reissue bonus disc: Live at Woodstock '94
| No. | Title | Length |
|---|---|---|
| 1. | "Iris" |
| 2. | "Top" |
| 3. | "The Beauty of Gray" |
| 4. | "Selling the Drama" |
| 5. | "Shit Towne" |
| 6. | "Lightning Crashes" |
| 7. | "I Alone" |
| 8. | "Operation Spirit (The Tyranny of Tradition)" |
| 9. | "White, Discussion" |

== Personnel ==
Adapted credits from the liner notes of Throwing Copper.

Live

- Ed Kowalczyk – lead vocals, rhythm guitar
- Chad Taylor – lead guitar, backing vocals
- Patrick Dahlheimer – bass
- Chad Gracey – drums, backing vocals

Technical personnel

- Jerry Harrison – production
- Lou Giordano – engineering, recording
- Ted Jensen – mastering
- Gary Kurfirst – executive production
- Tom Lord-Alge – mixing

== Charts ==
=== Weekly charts ===
Weekly chart performance for Throwing Copper
| Chart (1994–97) | Peak position |
|---|---|
| Australian Albums (ARIA) | 1 |
| Austrian Albums (Ö3 Austria) | 11 |
| Belgian Albums (Ultratop Flanders) | 8 |
| Belgian Albums (Ultratop Wallonia) | 38 |
| Canada Top Albums/CDs (RPM) | 1 |
| Dutch Albums (Album Top 100) | 5 |
| European Albums (European Top 100 Albums) | 26 |
| Finnish Albums (Suomen virallinen lista) | 38 |
| German Albums (Offizielle Top 100) | 28 |
| New Zealand Albums (RMNZ) | 1 |
| Norwegian Albums (VG-lista) | 24 |
| Swedish Albums (Sverigetopplistan) | 11 |
| UK Albums (Official Charts) | 37 |
| US Billboard 200 | 1 |

=== Year-end charts ===
1995 year-end chart performance for Throwing Copper
| Chart (1995) | Position |
|---|---|
| Australian Albums (ARIA) | 8 |
| Austrian Albums (Ö3 Austria) | 40 |
| Belgian Albums (Ultratop Flanders) | 17 |
| Dutch Albums (Album Top 100) | 21 |
| European Albums (European Top 100 Albums) | 100 |
| German Albums (Offizielle Top 100) | 68 |
| New Zealand Albums (RMNZ) | 7 |
| Swedish Albums & Compilations (Sverigetopplistan) | 100 |
| US Billboard 200 | 8 |

1996 year-end chart performance for Throwing Copper
| Chart (1996) | Position |
|---|---|
| Australian Albums (ARIA) | 8 |
| New Zealand Albums (RMNZ) | 21 |
| US Billboard 200 | 95 |

1997 year-end chart performance for Throwing Copper
| Chart (1997) | Position |
|---|---|
| Australian Albums (ARIA) | 55 |

2002 year-end chart performance for Throwing Copper
| Chart (2002) | Position |
|---|---|
| Canadian Alternative Albums (Nielsen SoundScan) | 150 |

=== Decade-end charts ===
Decade-end chart performance for Throwing Copper
| Chart (1990–1999) | Position |
|---|---|
| US Billboard 200 | 60 |

== Certifications ==
Certifications for Throwing Copper
| Region | Certification | Certified units/sales |
|---|---|---|
| Australia (ARIA) | 10× Platinum | 700,000^{‡} |
| Belgium (BRMA) | Gold | 25,000^{*} |
| Canada (Music Canada) | 7× Platinum | 700,000^{^} |
| Netherlands (NVPI) | 2× Platinum | 200,000^{^} |
| New Zealand (RMNZ) | 6× Platinum | 90,000^{^} |
| Sweden (GLF) | Gold | 50,000^{^} |
| United Kingdom (BPI) | Gold | 100,000^{^} |
| United States (RIAA) | 8× Platinum | 8,000,000^{^} |
^{*} Sales figures based on certification alone.^{^} Shipments figures based on certification alone.^{‡} Sales+streaming figures based on certification alone.
