= Chad Taylor (guitarist) =

American musician (born 1970)

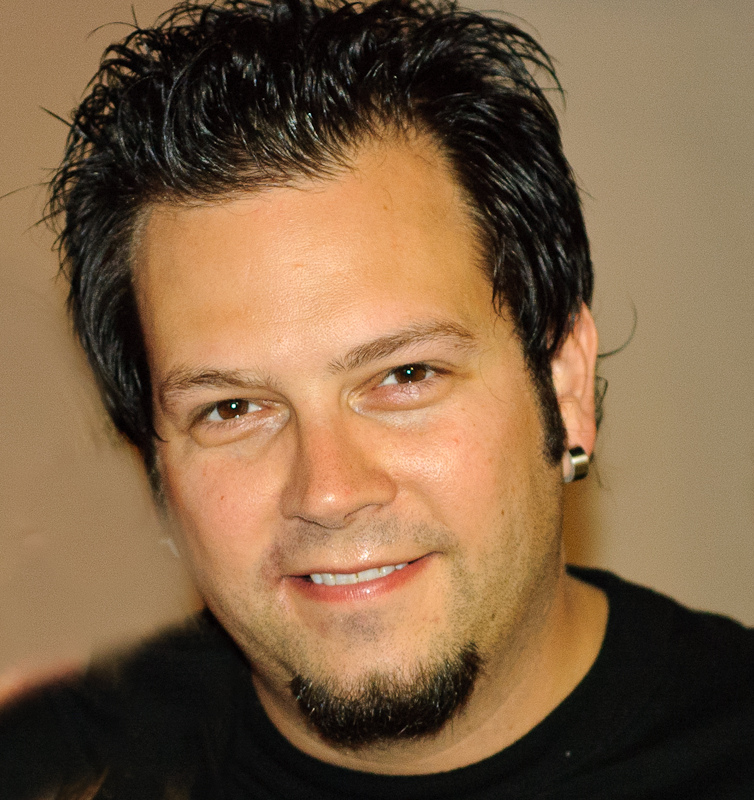
- Taylor in 2011

Background information
- Born: 1970 or 1971 (age 54–55); Baltimore, Maryland, U.S.
- Origin: York, Pennsylvania, U.S.
- Genres: Alternative rock, post-grunge, hard rock, pop rock
- Occupation: Musician
- Instrument: Guitar
- Years active: 1980s–present
- Labels: Radioactive Records; Epic Records; Questionable Entertainment
- Member of: Chad Taylor and Friends
- Formerly of: Live; The Gracious Few

Chad Taylor (born 1970 or 1971) is an American guitarist and backing vocalist for the band The Gracious Few and former guitarist for the band Live. Live have sold over 20 million records, including the 8× platinum album Throwing Copper.

== Career ==
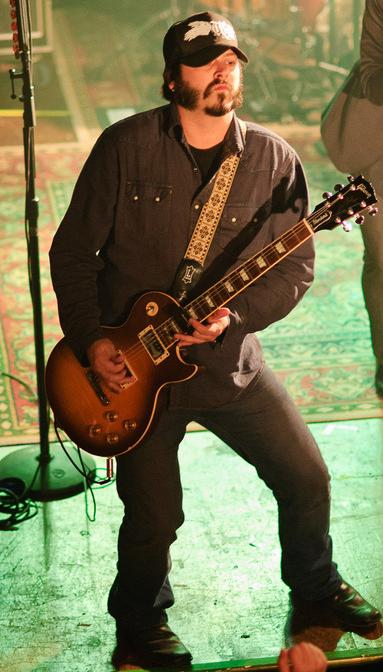
Taylor playing with The Gracious Few in October 2010

Taylor was the lead guitarist and backing vocalist of the band Live and had appeared on all their albums to June 2022. He met his Live bandmates aged 13 in middle school in York, Pennsylvania. When vocalist Ed Kowalczyk left the band in 2009, Taylor formed the band The Gracious Few along with Live bandmates Patrick Dahlheimer and Chad Gracey and Kevin Martin and Sean Hennesy from Candlebox. They released their debut album The Gracious Few in 2010. In 2011, he announced that Live would reform without Kowalczyk. In 2012, Live reformed with new lead singer Chris Shinn. In June 2022, Live lead singer Ed Kowalczyk announced that Taylor had been fired from the band.

Taylor has produced records for other artists, including the 1996 album Happily Ever After by Solution A.D. and Play the Piano Drunk, the debut EP of his brother Adam Taylor.

In November 2022, Taylor was sued by a former business associate for fraudulent misrepresentations and failing to pay alleged debts. The lawsuit contained detailed allegations and documents demonstrating that Taylor had grossly inflated his net worth before and during the transaction. In response to the suit, former bandmate Chad Gracey stated "unfortunately for my former band mate who tends to deny the truth no matter what, the note is real and the supporting information in the claim seems irrefutable." In February 2023, Rolling Stone published an article on the discord within Live, mostly focusing on the issues involving Taylor, after which the same business associate filed a defamation suit against Taylor. In March 2025, the defamation lawsuit was settled with undisclosed terms after Taylor provided a sworn affidavit to "correct and clarify" past statements he had made. The debt lawsuit was settled in July 2025.

In May 2023, Taylor accepted a friend's invitation to sing and play guitar at a small brewpub in Wrightsville, Pennsylvania. This led to his forming a band called Chad Taylor and Friends, with performances at a downtown Lancaster venue in October and November 2023. Their 2024 performances included Philadelphia in January, Pianos in New York in February, and Wilmington, Delaware, in March and June. The band was part of the Lancaster Roots & Blues Festival in September 2024.

== Personal life ==
Taylor is married to Lisa, a yoga practitioner. They have three children, Ruby Lou, Scarlett and Delilah. They live in Lancaster, Pennsylvania.

Taylor runs a guitar shop named Tone Tailors in northern Lancaster County within an industrial park named Rock Lititz.

== Discography ==
For Taylor's history with the band Live through 2022, see the Live discography.

=== With The Gracious Few ===
- The Gracious Few (2010)

== Equipment used ==
Taylor's equipment was listed in a September 2010 interview with Guitar Edge magazine.

- Guitars: Two Gibson 1959 Les Paul Reissues.
- Amps and Cabinets: Early 1960s Marshall JMP, Marshall 4x12 cabinet with Celestion 30-watt Greenbacks, Orange AD30HTC.

== See also ==
- List of alternative-rock artists
- List of guitarists
- List of people from Lancaster County, Pennsylvania
- List of people from York, Pennsylvania
