= Chad Gracey =

American drummer

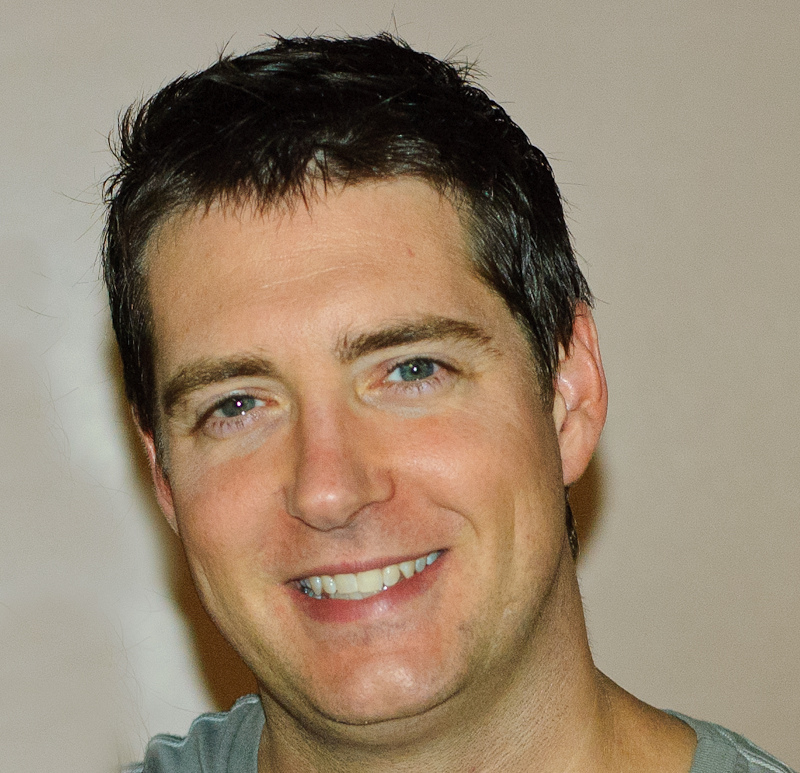

Background information
- Origin: York, Pennsylvania, U.S.
- Genres: Alternative rock, post-grunge, hard rock
- Instrument: Drums
- Years active: 1980s–present
- Formerly of: Live; The Gracious Few

Chad Gracey is an American drummer known for his former membership in the bands Live and The Gracious Few. Live have sold over 20 million records, including the 8× platinum album Throwing Copper.

== Biography ==
Gracey is a founding member of the band Live and has appeared on all their albums to date. He met his future Live bandmates in middle school in York. When vocalist Ed Kowalczyk left the band in 2009, Gracey formed the band The Gracious Few along with Patrick Dahlheimer and Chad Taylor of Live and Kevin Martin and Sean Hennesy from the band Candlebox. They released their debut album The Gracious Few in 2010. In 2011, Live announced their intention to record new material. They began recording with new lead singer Chris Shinn in 2012. In 2016, it was announced that Kowalczyk had rejoined the band, with plans to go on tour in 2017. Gracey left Live in 2022 and filed a suit against former member Chad Taylor.

== Discography ==
=== With Live ===
- all albums (1989–2014)

=== With The Gracious Few ===
- The Gracious Few (2010)
