= Patrick Dahlheimer =

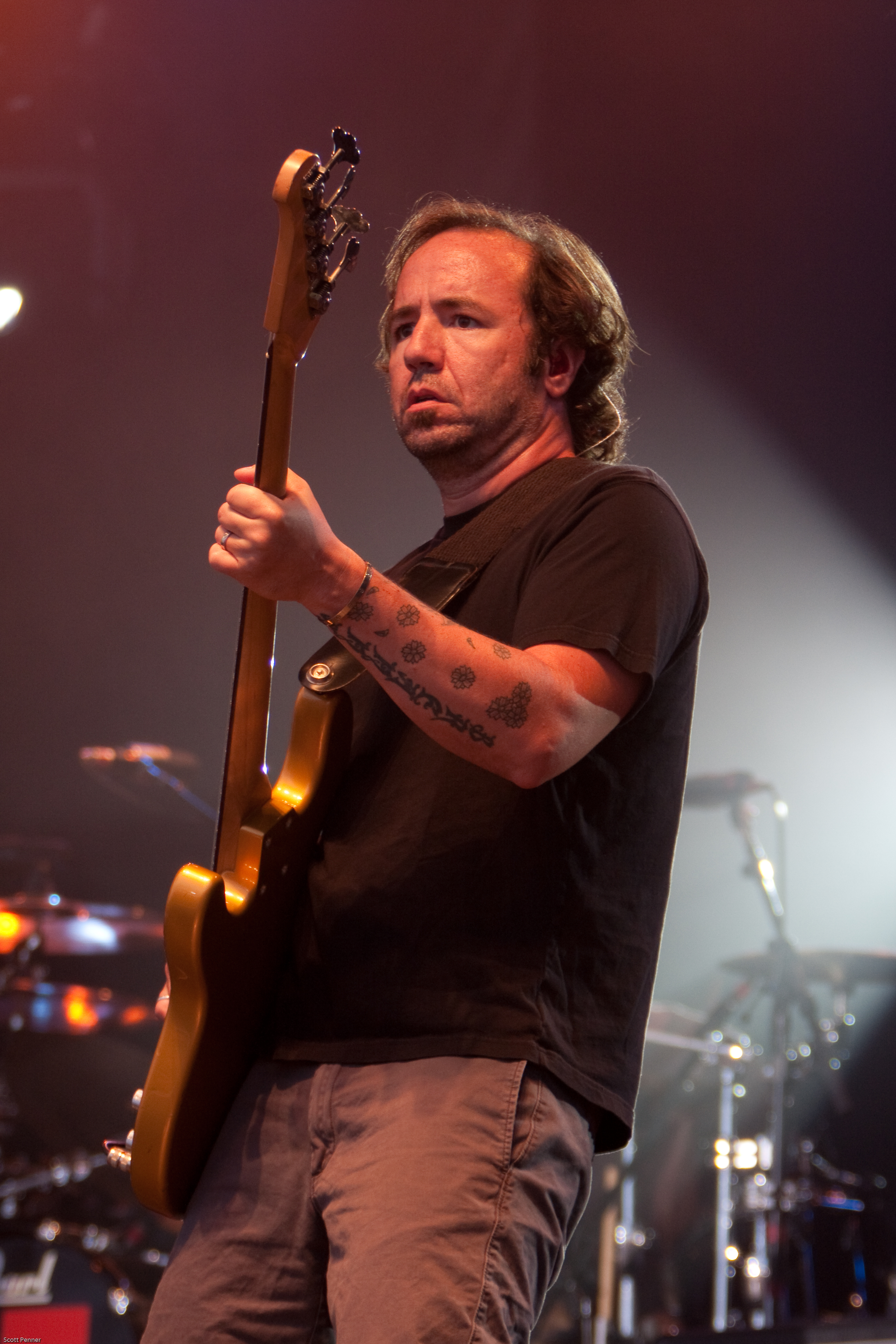
- Pat playing with Live in July 2009

Background information
- Origin: York, Pennsylvania, U.S.
- Genres: Alternative rock, post-grunge, hard rock
- Instrument: Bass guitar
- Years active: 1980s–present
- Labels: Radioactive Records; Epic Records; Questionable Entertainment
- Formerly of: Live; The Gracious Few

Patrick Dahlheimer is the former bassist for Live and bassist for The Gracious Few. Live have sold over 20 million records, including the 8× platinum album Throwing Copper.

== Biography ==
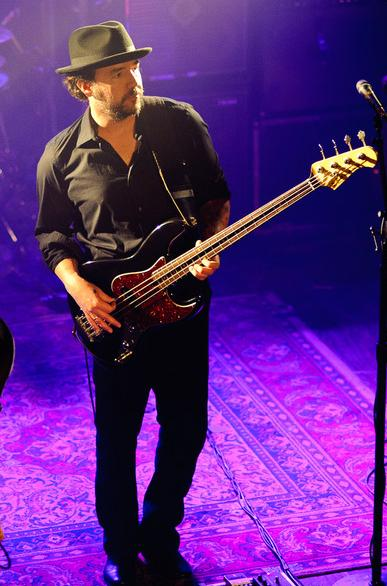
Dahlheimer playing with The Gracious Few in October 2010

Dahlheimer is a founding member of the band Live and has appeared on all their albums to date. He met his future Live bandmates at middle school in York, Pennsylvania. When vocalist Ed Kowalczyk left the band in 2009, Dahlheimer formed the band The Gracious Few along with Chad Taylor and Chad Gracey of Live and Kevin Martin and Sean Hennesy from the band Candlebox. They released their debut album The Gracious Few in 2010. In 2011, Live announced their intention to record new material and Chris Shinn was brought in as the new lead singer in 2012.

== Discography ==
=== With Live ===
- all albums to date

=== With The Gracious Few ===
- The Gracious Few (2010)
