= Ed Kowalczyk =

American musician (born 1971)

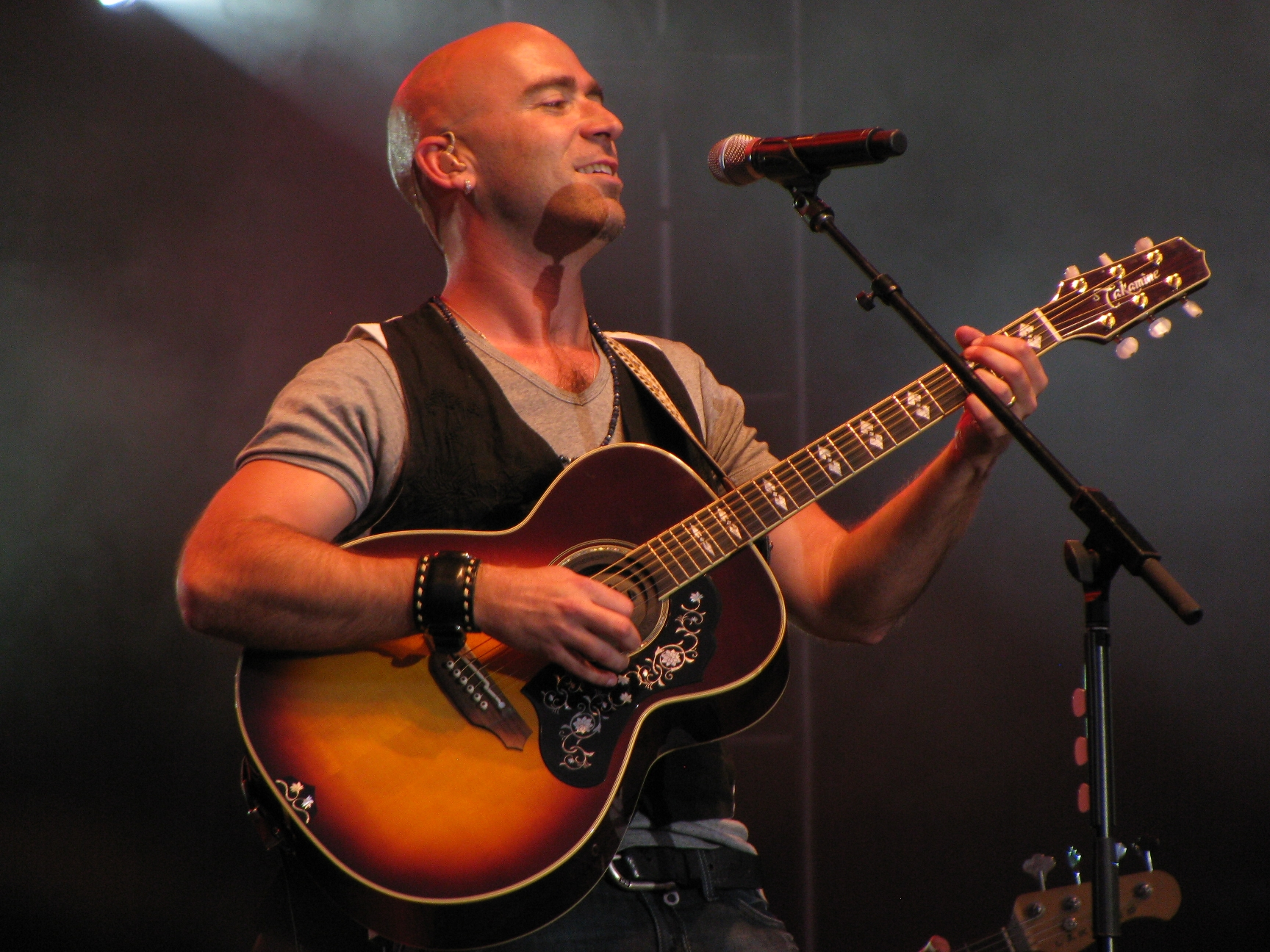
- Kowalczyk performing in 2009

Background information
- Born: July 16, 1971 (age 55)
- Origin: York, Pennsylvania, U.S.
- Genres: Alternative rock; post-grunge; hard rock
- Occupations: Musician; songwriter
- Instruments: Vocals; guitar
- Years active: 1984–present
- Labels: Radioactive; Epic; Sony; V2
- Member of: Live
- Website: www.edkowalczyk.com

Ed Kowalczyk (born July 16, 1971) is an American singer, songwriter, musician who is the lead singer of the rock band Live. He launched a solo career after leaving Live in 2009, releasing his first album, Alive, in 2010. He rejoined Live in December 2016, and is currently the band's only official member.

== Early life ==
Kowalczyk was born on July 16, 1971. He grew up in York, Pennsylvania, and was raised in the Roman Catholic faith. He graduated from William Penn High School in 1989 where he met his bandmates Chad Taylor, Chad Gracey and Patrick Dahlheimer.

== Career ==
Ed Kowalczyk was the lead singer, lyricist, and main songwriter for the band Live from its formation until 2009. When he left the band, the other three members issued a statement detailing what they felt were inappropriate actions by Kowalczyk in regards to contract and salary negotiations. Kowalczyk was sued by the band, seeking damages and an injunction against using the name "Live". Kowalczyk rejoined the band in December 2016 after months of rumors. In June 2022, Kowalczyk took a 55% controlling ownership of the band, immediately firing founding guitarist Chad Taylor from the band. In October 2022, Kowalczyk and three new touring musicians began performing as Live without Patrick Dahlheimer and Chad Gracey, leaving Kowalczyk as the sole remaining founding member of the band.

Kowalczyk discussing The Distance to Here in 2000

Following his departure from Live, Kowalczyk recorded his first solo album, Alive, which was released in 2010. In 2012, he recorded The Garden and in 2013 The Flood and the Mercy. In 2014-2016 he embarked on an extensive tour celebrating the 20th anniversary of Throwing Copper, playing acoustic concerts across the U.S., Europe and Australia.

Kowalczyk has worked with musicians Stuart Davis and Glen Ballard and singers Anouk, Neneh Cherry, Adam Duritz of Counting Crows, Red Wanting Blue, and Shelby Lynne. He featured on the song "Evolution Revolution Love," from the 2001 Tricky album Blowback. He collaborated with Chris Frantz, Jerry Harrison and Tina Weymouth (ex-Talking Heads, then performing as The Heads) on the song "Indie Hair" from their 1996 album No Talking, Just Head.

He appeared in the David Fincher film Fight Club as a waiter, his only film acting credit to date.

== Political activities ==
Kowalczyk performed John Lennon's "Imagine" with Slash in 2003 at "Peace on the Beach," a rally to protest the coming Iraq War.

Kowalczyk is a member of Canadian charity Artists Against Racism and has worked with them on awareness campaigns.

== Personal life ==
Kowalczyk is married and has 4 children. He moved to Ridgefield, Connecticut in 2013 after having lived in Los Angeles, California.

== Discography ==
=== Studio albums ===
Year	Album details	Peak chart positions			
Year	Album details	US	AUS	BEL (FL)	NLD
2010	Alive: Released: July 6, 2010; Label: Soul Whisper; Format: CD	166	42	27	4
2013	The Flood and the Mercy: Released: October 29, 2013; Label: Soul Whisper; Format: CD	—	—	136	—

=== EPs ===
Year	EP details
2012	The Garden: Released: November 2012; Label: Harbour; Format: Download

=== Singles ===
Year	Single	Peak chart positions			Album
Year	Single	US Alt.	AUS	NLD	Album
2001	"Evolution Revolution Love" (Tricky featuring Ed Kowalczyk & Hawkman)	35	—	79	Blowback
2010	"Grace"	—	100	—	Alive
2010	"Stand"	—	—	—	Alive
2013	"Seven"	—	—	—	The Flood and the Mercy

== Songs in TV ==
- "Evolution Revolution Love" (Tricky featuring Ed Kowalczyk) was used in the NBC series The West Wing in the episode "Manchester (Part 1)".
- "The Great Beyond" was included on the soundtrack of the 2011 film Killing Bono.
