= Radioactive Records =

Defunct American record label

Radioactive Records J.V.
- Parent company: Universal Music Group
- Founded: 1990
- Founder: Gary Kurfirst
- Status: Defunct
- Distributor(s): MCA Records (originally); Geffen Records/UMe (Reissues)
- Genre: Various
- Country of origin: United States
- Official website: radioactive.com

Radioactive Records was an American record label. It was formed as a joint venture between talent manager Gary Kurfirst (who managed such acts as the Ramones, Big Audio Dynamite, Deee-Lite and Deborah Harry) and MCA Records, and it is now out of business. Its catalogue is now owned by Geffen Records and licensed through Universal Music Enterprises.

Acts on the label included Live, Black Grape, the Ramones, Big Audio Dynamite, Traci Lords, and Angelfish (Shirley Manson—Manson joined Garbage courtesy of Gary Kurfirst). The band Pray TV from Melbourne, Australia, and British group Cooler Than Jesus (featuring Simon White, who later played in Brit-pop band Menswear) were also signed by the label in the early 1990s.

Radioactive released the original soundtrack album for the nineteenth James Bond film, The World Is Not Enough, as well as the single of the title track, which was a massive hit throughout Europe.

In 1997, Kurfirst formed a related label, Radiouniverse, as a joint venture with Universal Music Group's Universal Records. It debuted with albums from Radio Iodine and Dig, bands that were formerly signed to Radioactive. Other acts signed to the label included The Devlins and Tyzle Fly.

The Ramones catalogue, which was distributed by EMI's Chrysalis Records around the world except US and Canada, is owned by Parlophone (division of Warner Music Group) except US and Canada, where it is owned by Geffen and UMe.

== See also ==
- Lists of record labels
