= Florence Miller Pierce =

American painter (1918–2007)

Florence Melva Miller Pierce
- Born: July 27, 1918; Washington, D.C., U.S.
- Died: October 25, 2007 (aged 89)
- Education: Corcoran School of Art, Emil Bisttram School of Art
- Known for: Resin relief paintings, Transcendental Painting Group
- Style: Minimalism, monochrome painting
- Movement: Transcendental Painting Group
- Spouse: Horace Pierce
- Children: Christopher Miller Pierce

Florence Melva Pierce née Miller (July 27, 1918 – October 25, 2007) was an American artist best known for her innovative resin relief paintings. Her work has often been linked with monochrome painting and minimalism.

== Early life and education ==
Florence Melva Miller was born on July 27, 1918. She grew up in Washington, D.C. where her parents owned and managed a large boarding school named the Countryside School. As a child traveling to New Mexico to visit her mother's family in Albuquerque and Santa Fe, Miller became familiar with the landscape which would later become her home. At fifteen Miller began to study art with a private tutor, May Ashton. It was Ashton who introduced Miller to the Phillips Collection, considered to be the first museum of Modern Art in the United States. It was a rare opportunity for the young girl to develop an appreciation of some of modern art's greatest masters. Miller spent considerable time at the museum and began to take classes at the Studio School there in 1935.

Following her graduation from high school, she wished to continue her study of art. Having learned of noted artist Emil Bisttram's School of Art in Taos, New Mexico, Miller convinced her parents to allow her to attend by arranging a meeting with Bisttram while he was visiting Washington, D.C. mounting a mural exhibition. The following summer, at only eighteen, Miller traveled alone to the remote village of Taos to study with Bisttram. While in Taos that summer, she and the other students painted mostly traditional Southwest landscapes, still lifes, and portraits.

Following her return home to Washington, D.C., Miller studied briefly at the Corcoran School of Art. During this time she met Theosophists Auriel Bessemer and his wife. The couple had studied with Annie Besant, who was herself a student of Theosophical Society co-founder Helena Blavatsky. This meeting would prove to be a connection to ideas Miller encountered later in the Transcendental Painting Group. Bessemer offered Miller a scholarship to his school, but she decided to return to Taos. She arrived back in Taos in January in the middle of a snowstorm.

Miller found that the winter program at The Bisttram School of Art was very different from what she had experienced in the summer. With fewer students the dynamic was much more intense and the focus was entirely on abstraction rather than on figurative painting. It was also hard work. The students were responsible for keeping the studio's woodstove alight and were required to work eight hours a day. During this period she met fellow art student Horace Pierce. The two began a friendship which eventually became a romance. They were married in 1938.

Of her years studying at the Bisttram School Miller later said, "It wasn't so much an education as an initiation into art." Before founding his own school in Taos, Bisttram had taught at the Nikolai Roerich Museum School in New York. The Russian mystic painter, Roerich, felt that art had the ability to change world consciousness and promote peace and brotherhood. Bisttram had brought these spiritual values with him to Taos, where in addition to rigorous exercises in composition and color theory, he expected his students to read books on Transcendentalism and Theosophy, including works by Emerson, Nietzsche, Jung, and Kandinsky's Concerning the Spiritual in Art.

== Career ==
In 1938 Bisttram invited Miller and her husband Horace Pierce to join the Transcendental Painting Group, which he co-founded with artist Raymond Jonson. Miller was one of only two women (along with Agnes Pelton) to belong to the group and, at only 19, she was certainly the youngest member.

Although Miller and her husband only attended two meetings of the Transcendental Painting Group there are elements of the group's philosophy that remain apparent in her mature work. The definition of Transcendental as "beyond common thought or experience" suggests an exploration of new forms and new visions. The idea, as Miller Pierce said, was “not to paint the world literally ... what one sees, but to create new emotional forms through the psyche.” Light was very important in transcendental painting as a vehicle for expressing color, form, and rhythm. As attested to by the titles of numerous essays written about Miller (for example: "Traveling Light", "A light-filled domain", "In Touch with Light") – light would become fundamental to Miller's work, particularly in her resin reliefs.

Much of the work that Miller produced during this period is now lost. When she and her husband left New Mexico for New York City, she left most of her paintings behind in Taos. Bisttram eventually painted over them (possibly because he'd run out of money and needed the canvases). However, as Miller said, they were "student works ... terrible and insincere," so she never regretted the loss very keenly.

The Pierces had moved to New York City to seek funding for a film project Horace was working on. Although he was given an exhibition at the new Museum of Modern Art in 1940, the impending war made finding real backing for the film difficult. The couple ended up being forced to make scented candles to make ends meet. Miller stopped painting during this period. The couple had lost a son just before leaving for New York, and Miller gave birth to a second son, Christopher Miller Pierce, during their early months in the city.

In 1942 the couple moved to Los Angeles, encouraged by artists they knew who lived and worked in L.A. in the film industry. There were also a number of their old Taos acquaintances who had relocated there. Los Angeles proved to be an artistically fruitful place for Miller. Economically secure for the first time in their marriage, Miller was able to draw and paint again for the first time since Taos. She studied Chinese paintings and began to draw with graphite. The resulting pieces usually contained a single biomorphic form within a softly shaded field. Most of the forms were flower or shell-like. Precise and delicate, a few of the paintings from this period survived and were later shown in the Southwest.

Following the onset of health issues and economic setbacks Horace Pierce decided the family should move back to New Mexico in 1946. The period was relatively fallow for Miller. While Pierce found work as a technical illustrator, Miller frequently worked at her mother's new school in Albuquerque. Though the couple met with former members of the Transcendental Painting Group, the fact that the couple were not painting created a barrier. As Miller said, "We didn't have an answer. We had to make a living. And Raymond would cross you off his list if you weren’t painting." In the later 1950s Miller began working on sumi brush drawings on rice paper. Black on white, the sumi pieces are spontaneous and abstract, but with the suggestion of an organic origin beneath. Her work on these paintings stopped in 1958 when Horace died of a cerebral hemorrhage.

At the time of her marriage, Miller had kept her maiden name, but after her husband's death she took on the name Pierce. For several years following her husband's death, Pierce did not paint or make art. However, by the late 1960s she began to work again, this time not with paintings but sculpture. She began carving in a variety of materials including polyurethane, Styrofoam, balsa wood cement, and stone. The new medium reinvigorated her, providing "a sense of risk and adventure that is totally necessary to my creative life."

The first time Pierce wanted to experiment with sandblasting, she went to a shop where headstones were carved. Pierce asked to be allowed to use the machines for her art. The men told her she'd have to come back "with her man," before they'd let her use the equipment. Going outside she hired a passing stranger to come back inside with her as her requisite male accompaniment. The resultant wood and foam carvings, which she called "Totems", made by the use of the stencils, are often intricate. On the stones and foam pieces appear some of the basic geometric forms from both early paintings and later resin works (circles, triangles, crescents) but also at times textured grains and amorphous forms that suggest fossils emerging from stone or a forgotten glyphic language. Later works on Styrofoam slabs were painted over with a mixture of sand and latex. These pieces, with their sandstone-like skins, were called Earth Skins. She began to show these in the early 1970s.

The origin of the resin works, which Pierce would go on to explore, refine, and create for the rest of her artistic life, is well known. In 1969 while working on a foam piece Pierce accidentally spilled some resin onto a piece of aluminum foil. She held the foil to the light and the effect of the mirror surface reflecting light up through the resin entranced her. In the beginning, Pierce poured the resin onto mirrored glass, but the resin did not bond well with the surface. Eventually she began to use Plexiglas mirrors (Mirrorplex) which allowed the resin to stick. Art critic Julie Sasse writes of these pieces, "Whereas her earlier easel paintings relied on color and light, these new works created their own emanating glow ..."

Pierce's experimentation with the physically arduous process of pouring resin continued. Layer upon layer of transparent resin was poured over the mirrored surface, which allowed for a depth and play of light to work through the color (or absence of color such as in her white or black pieces) within the resin. In some of the pieces she added milled fiberglass to the resin to increase its opacity. She later discovered ways to lay vellum over the surface of the resin in order to modulate the surface. She created a variety of effects, from smooth or matte finishes to delicate crumples or fabric-like folds, all of which subtly and sensually change the way a viewer might experience the color and light of the piece.

Pierce also continued to experiment with forms, and though hung from the wall like paintings, these works retained a sense of sculpture. The pieces themselves were often shaped into triangles, lozenges, fan-shapes, or circles, and sometimes Pierce would create forms within forms, including a colored square within a white opaque triangle, for example. In the colored pieces the effect is a breath-taking purity and range of color that shifts from dense to pale, from dark to bright. It is hard to imagine bluer blues or more skull-piercing oranges or more mysterious reds than those Pierce achieved. However, it is in the later white pieces that Pierce perhaps attains her most refined and understated moments. A distillation of years of practice as an artist and the exploration of the philosophies she had been introduced to as a young girl, Pierce said of them, "The whites are my favorite, because I feel I've done the most with the least ... My works are contemplative. They're about stilling the mind."

== Critical commentary ==
Lucy Lippard
"I can't think of Pierce’s work without visualizing that unique glow—sometimes faint behind a stronger color, sometimes trapped as an undertone subtly giving way to a new chromatics, sometimes all-pervasive, sometimes blotchy, sometimes smoky, foggy, icy .... Her monochrome resin squares create their own weather."

Timothy Robert Rodgers
"In a recent series of paintings titled Clouds, she has created her most luminous work that literally seems to transcend the bounds of earth and exist somewhere between the light and the ground. Such earthly transcendence might be, for her, the path to perfection."

W. Jackson Rushing
"Pierce's work paradoxically reifies the ineffable: Precious, seductive, talismanic, and transcendent, it makes an inner reality tangibly present."

Julia Sasse
"Pierce herself has likened her work to the surrender one gives to love. And in surrendering to her art, she has shared with her audience the greatest gift an artist makes—works of beauty and timeless depth."

== Works ==
=== Selected solo exhibitions ===
- 1974 Raymond Jonson Gallery, University of New Mexico, Albuquerque, NM
- 1985 Raymond Jonson Gallery, University of New Mexico, Albuquerque, NM
- 1987 Graham Gallery, Albuquerque, NM
- 1988 LewAllen-Butler Gallery, Santa Fe, NM
- 1991 Graham Gallery, Albuquerque, NM
- 1992 Boritzer/Gray Gallery, Santa Monica, CA
- 1994 Charlotte Jackson Fine Art, Santa Fe, NM
- 1995 The Amarillo Art Museum, Amarillo, TX
- 1996 Charlotte Jackson Fine Art, Santa Fe, NM
- 1997 Charlotte Jackson Fine Art, Santa Fe, NM
- 1998 Charlotte Jackson Fine Art, Santa Fe, NM
- 1999 Charlotte Jackson Fine Art, Santa Fe, NM
- 2000 Charlotte Jackson Fine Art, Santa Fe, NM
- 2001 Charlotte Jackson Fine Art, Santa Fe, NM
- 2002 Charlotte Jackson Fine Art, Santa Fe, NM
- 2003 Charlotte Jackson Fine Art, Santa Fe, NM
- 2004 Charlotte Jackson Fine Art, Santa Fe, NM
- 2005 Tucson Museum of Art, Tucson, Arizona
- 2006 Charlotte Jackson Fine Art, Santa Fe, NM
- 2010 Charlotte Jackson Fine Art, Santa Fe, NM

=== Selected group exhibitions ===
- 1971 Los Angeles County Fine Arts Fair, Los Angeles, CA
- 1973 The Fine Arts Museum of New Mexico Biennial, The Fine Arts Museum, Santa Fe, NM
- 1975 The Fine Arts Museum of New Mexico Biennial, The Fine Arts Museum, Santa Fe, NM
- 1982 Invitational, Meridian Gallery, Albuquerque, NM
- 1983 Daily Bread: Art from the Female Experience, Public Library of Albuquerque, Albuquerque, NM
- 1984 Invitational, Roswell Museum Art Center, Roswell, NM
- 1985 On the Wall/Off the Wall (invitational), Center for Contemporary Arts, Santa Fe, NM
- 1989 Albuquerque 50's, University of New Mexico Art Museum, Albuquerque, NM
- 1990 The Art of Albuquerque, Albuquerque Community Foundation and the Museum of Albuquerque, Albuquerque, NM
- 1990–91 Alcove Show Invitational, Fine Arts Museum of New Mexico, Santa Fe, NM
- 1992 Kandinsky and the American Avant-Garde: 1912–1950, Dayton Art Institute, Dayton, OH; traveled to: The Phillips Collection, Washington, D.C; Terra Museum of American Art, Chicago, IL; Amon Carter Museum of Western Art, Fort Worth, TX;
- 1991–92 “The Second Wave: American Abstraction of the 19302 and 1940s – Selections from The Penny and Elton Yosuna Collection,” The Worcester Art Museum, MA; traveled to: Samuel P Harn Museum, University of Florida, Gainesville; Delaware Art Museum, Wilmington
- 1993 Three Women – Mala Breuer, Agnes Martin, Florence Pierce, Charlotte Jackson Fine Art, Santa Fe, NM
- 1994 Charlotte Jackson Fine Art, Santa Fe, NM
- 1995 Recent Acquisitions from Florence Miller Pierce, Jonson Gallery, University of N M, Albuquerque, NM
- 1995 Award Recipient Exhibition – SITE Santa Fe Honors New Mexico Artists, SITE Santa Fe, Santa Fe, NM
- 1998 The City Series, Cedar Rapids Museum, Cedar Rapids, IA
- 1999 Postmark: An Abstract Effect, Site Santa Fe, Santa Fe, NM
- 2001 Originals: New Mexico Women Artists, organized by the New Mexico Committee of the National Museum of Women in the Arts, Harwood Museum, Taos, NM
- 2003 Recipients of Governor's Award, Governor's Gallery, Santa Fe, NM
- 2004–05 In Pursuit of Perfection: The Work of Agnes Martin, Maria Martinez and Florence Pierce, Museum of Fine Arts, Museum of New Mexico, Santa Fe, NM
- 2009 Illumination: Georgia O'Keeffe, Agnes Pelton, Agnes Martin, and Florence Miller Pierce
- 2010 Emil Bisttram and the Taos School of Art, Roswell Museum and Art Center, Roswell, NM
- 2012 The Transcendental Painting Group, David Findlay Jr. Gallery, New York, NY, 2012
- 2013–14 American Abstraction 1930–1945, Michael Rosenfeld Gallery, New York, NY

=== Selected public collections ===
- Albright-Knox Art Gallery, Buffalo, NY
- Albuquerque Museum, Albuquerque, NM
- City of Albuquerque Public Art Program
- Contemporary Museum, Honolulu, HI
- Amarillo Museum of Art, Amarillo, TX
- Henry Art Museum, University of Washington, Seattle, WA
- Jonson Gallery, University of New Mexico, Albuquerque, NM
- Lannan Foundation, Santa Fe, NM
- Liquid Paper Company, Houston, TX
- The Marion Koogler McNay Art Museum, San Antonio, TX
- New Mexico Museum of Art, Santa Fe, NM
- Rockefeller University, New York, NY
- Rust Tractor Company, Albuquerque, NM
- Sasebo Museum, Sasebo, Japan

=== Selected books and catalogs ===
- 1982 The Transcendental Painting Group of New Mexico, 1938–1941, the Albuquerque Museum.
- 1982 Daily Bread: Art from the Female Experience, New Mexico Arts Division, National Endowment for the Arts.
- 1983 Kathryn Gabriel. Transcendental Paintings Inspired by the Landscape and Mind, Quantum, University of New Mexico.
- 1988 Betty Ann Brown, Arlene Raven, and Kenna Love. Exposures: Women and their Art, Newsage Press.
- 1991 Susan E. Strickler and Elaine D. Gustafson. The Second Wave: American Abstraction of 1930s and 1940s, Worcester Art Museum.
- 1992 Gail Levine and Marianne Lorenz. Theme and Improvisation: Kandinsky and the American Avant-Garde 1912–1950, Dayton Art Institute.
- 1994 Stuart Shedletsky, Editor. Still Working, The Corcoran Gallery, Washington, D.C., Parsons School of Design in association with the University of Washington Press.
- 1995 Patricia Trenton, Editor. Independent Spirits – Women Painters of the American West, 1890 – 1945. Autry Museum of American Heritage in conjunction with the University of California Press.
- 1998 American Abstract Art of 1930s and 1940s: The J. Donald Nichols Collection. Harry Abrams Press.
- 1998 Lucy Lippard, Florence Pierce: In Touch With Light. Palace Press International.
- 1999 The Transcendental Painting Group: Major Paintings, Michael Rosenfeld Gallery, New York.
- 2004 Lucy Lippard, in In Pursuit of Perfection – The Art of Agnes Martin, Maria Martinez, and Florence Pierce. Museum of Fine Arts, Santa Fe.
- 2005 Julie Sasse. Florence Pierce: A Light-filled Domain, Tucson Museum of Art.
- 2009 Timothy Robert Rodgers, Sharyn R. Udall, Michael Zakian, and Karen Moss. Illuminations: The Paintings of Georgia O’Keeffe, Agnes Pelton, Agnes Martin, and Florence Pierce. Merrell Press.

=== Television and film ===
- 1943 Meshes of the Afternoon. Short film. Directed by Maya Deren.
- 1990 "The Art of Growing Older," KNME-TV, Los Colores, NM, February 14, 1990
- 1994 "Still Working," CBS, The Sunday Morning Show, June 26, 1994
