= Angeline Rivas =

American contemporary painter (born 1981)

- Born: 1981 (age 44–45); Kansas City, Missouri, U.S.
- Education: BFA, Otis College of Art and Design (2005); MFA, ArtCenter College of Design (2022)
- Known for: Painting
- Movement: Contemporary art

Angeline Rivas (born 1981) is an American painter based in Los Angeles whose airbrushed compositions merge mysticism, color theory, and California counterculture.

== Career and work ==
Rivas works primarily with airbrush on wood panel and canvas, creating layered compositions in fluorescent gradients of color. Her paintings often combine smooth, glowing atmospheres with abrupt interruptions—marks of tape, hand-drawn graffiti, or faint residue from previous layers—revealing the physical process beneath their polished surfaces. These traces introduce a tension between illusion and materiality, evoking both visionary experience and human fallibility.

Her imagery draws upon a broad range of references, including Californian new-age philosophies, cosmic symbolism, and apocalyptic imagination. The work explores how spiritual or transcendental ideals can mutate into aesthetic experience, using light and color to visualize states of energy, faith, and collapse. Critics have associated her practice with the transcendental abstraction of Agnes Pelton, the feminist exuberance of Judy Chicago, and the pop cosmologies of Kenny Scharf, while noting her distinct synthesis of mysticism and material critique.

== Selected press ==
- "Best in Show: Artillery 2023 Top Ten," Artillery, 2023.
- "The Best Booths at Felix LA 2024," ARTnews, 2024.
- "Stars Aligning: When Art Meets Astrology," Art Basel News, 2023.
