= Rattlesnake (Live song) =

- Cover of Swedish promo

Promotional single by Live

from the album Secret Samadhi
- Released: 1997
- Genre: Alternative rock; post-grunge; hard rock
- Length: 4:51
- Label: Radioactive
- Songwriter: Live
- Producers: Jay Healy; Live

Live singles chronology
"Turn My Head" (1997)	"Rattlesnake" (1997)	"The Dolphin's Cry" (1999)

"Rattlesnake" is a song by the American rock band Live. It was released as a promotional single from their fourth studio album, Secret Samadhi (1997).

== Chart performance ==
In the US, the song peaked at No. 18 on the Billboard Modern Rock Tracks chart and No. 15 on the Mainstream Rock Tracks chart. In Canada, "Rattlesnake" reached No. 13 on the RPM Alternative chart.

== Track listing ==
=== USA Promo CD single (RAR3P-90090) ===
- Tracks 2,3,4 and 5 recorded in Melbourne, Australia in May 1997, mixed by Jay Healy.
1. "Rattlesnake" (LP version) - 4:51
2. "Rattlesnake" (Live version) - 4:55
3. "Lakini's Juice" (Live version) - 4:55
4. "Freaks" (Live version) - 5:08
5. "Turn My Head" (Live version) - 4:08
