= John Register =

American painter

- Born: John Sherman Register; February 1, 1939; New York City, US
- Died: 9 April 1996 (aged 57); Malibu, California, US
- Known for: Painting
- Movement: Realism

John Register (1939–1996) was an American realist artist noted for his paintings and drawings, which were notably often minimalist, spare depictions of hotels, cafés, and empty chairs.

== Background ==
Register was born in 1939 in New York City to Dorothy Deming (née Pratt) Register Barrett, (1909-1998) and Samuel Croft Register. Siblings included: Samuel Croft Register Jr., Barbara Register, Eliot Steven Barrett, and Woodward Heard Register.

When he was 3, his parents divorced, and his mother married William G. Barrett, an Army psychiatrist. In 1942, they moved to the Los Angeles area. When he was 11, his father died.

Register graduated from the Lawrenceville School in New Jersey. After graduating from the University of California, Berkeley, with B.A. in Literature in 1961, he met his wife Catherine Richards in a photography class at Pasadena Art Center where he studied commercial art. Register also studied painting for a semester at the Académie Julian in Paris, and later studied at the California School of Fine Arts in San Francisco.

In 1964 the two moved to New York, where Register studied design and television at the Pratt Institute (founded by his great-grandfather, Charles Pratt). They were engaged in late 1963 and married on February 6, 1964, ultimately having three children. While living in New York, Register pursued a successful career as an advertising art director at Young & Rubicam and later McCaffrey and McCall — and lived in a Fifth Avenue apartment.

In 1972, just after his 33rd birthday, and unhappy with his work, Register excused himself from an important client meeting saying he had a dental appointment. He wrote a note to his boss and never returned. He subsequently became a full-time painter, spent a year in New York painting every day, and studied briefly at the Art Students League — before moving with his family to California. His interests included racing cars and ice-boats, photography, tennis, running, competitive chess, letter writing, reading, backpacking, fishing, and surfing.

Register was born with a genetic kidney disease and suffered kidney failure 15 years before his death. He received a kidney transplant from his sister in 1981 and, when that failed, received another transplant in 1985. In September 1994, he was told he had four to six weeks to live. He lived instead for 18 months, battling cancer (caused by anti-rejection medication) until his death in 1996 at the age of 57, in Malibu, California.

At the time, Register was survived by his wife, Catherine R. Register, (Catherine R. Murff); his mother, Dorothy Pratt Register Barrett (1909-1998) (then remarried) of Hillsborough, California; his sister, Barbara Pratt Register of Rolling Hills, California; his half-brother, Eliot Steven Barrett (1943-2013) of St. Helena, California; and his three children, Peter Eliot Register, David Croft Register and Kathryn (Kate) Sisson Register; and a grandson, John Sherman Register II. He has six grandchildren who were born after his death: Emma Jayne Register, Samuel Henry Register, Finn Alexander Register, Noah John Hoffmann, Sophie Caitlin Register and Elisabeth Catherine Hoffmann.

== Work ==
"It just happens that these old-time places in Venice are what I’m used to, and they are being torn down,...There’s a fragility to the urban fabric in L.A. that people aren’t aware of. I’m attracted to places where real life has taken place....For me, painting is less rendering and more distillation. I try to reduce an image to its essence,...It’s not beautiful furniture, it’s all very ordinary,...It’s as ordinary a chair as I could find. It’s as ordinary a table as I could find. It’s not that the ordinary chair is beautiful but that in its ordinariness it becomes the essence of a chair, or the essence of a table." - John Register

Register said: "I look for offbeat beauty. I don't know what I'm looking for until I find it. There are things so ugly that I can't paint them. Sometimes I get depressed by that city, and by other cities I visit. But I like the patina of things that have been battered by life".

In his 1989 biography of Register, John Register Persistent Observer, Barnaby Conrad, wrote that Register's "vision of isolated streets, empty coffee shops, long shadows, old hotels, and bus stations represent a haunting stillness tinged with regret and hope."

Register studied with the portrait painter Raymond Kinstler and landscape painter Lennart Anderson. He had his first show in Los Angeles in 1975 and received the Francis J. Greenburger Foundation Award from the Guggenheim Museum.

He has shown at the Modernism Gallery in San Francisco, David Stuart Gallery in Los Angeles, the Earl McGrath Gallery in Santa Monica, and the Laguna Art Museum. With his work often compared to Edward Hopper's, a show of drawings by Mr. Register and Edward Hopper took place in 1996. The San Jose Museum of Art hosted a major retrospective show of Mr. Register's work in the fall of 1997. The exhibit John Register: Persistent Observer took place at the Frederick R. Weisman Museum of Art at Pepperdine University, Malibu, CA, in 2000, subsequently traveling to his alma mater, the Lawrenceville School, Lawrenceville, NJ, and later to the West Valley Art Museum, Sun City, Arizona.

Register's work was used, and credited, as the inspiration for the video for "Turn My Head" by the band Live in 1997. His paintings were also featured in the movie In Her Shoes, (2005), the director, Curtis Hanson using the paintings to suggest "loneliness."

== See also ==
- Edward Hopper
