= Cady Wells =

American painter

- Born: Henry Cady Wells; November 15, 1904; Southbridge, Massachusetts
- Died: November 5, 1954 (aged 49); Santa Fe, New Mexico
- Education: Andrew Dasburg
- Alma mater: Harvard University; University of Arizona
- Known for: Painting
- Movement: Rio Grande Painters

Cady Wells (November 15, 1904 – November 5, 1954) was a painter and patron of the arts who settled in New Mexico the 1930s. He has been the subject of numerous solo exhibitions, during his life and posthumously.

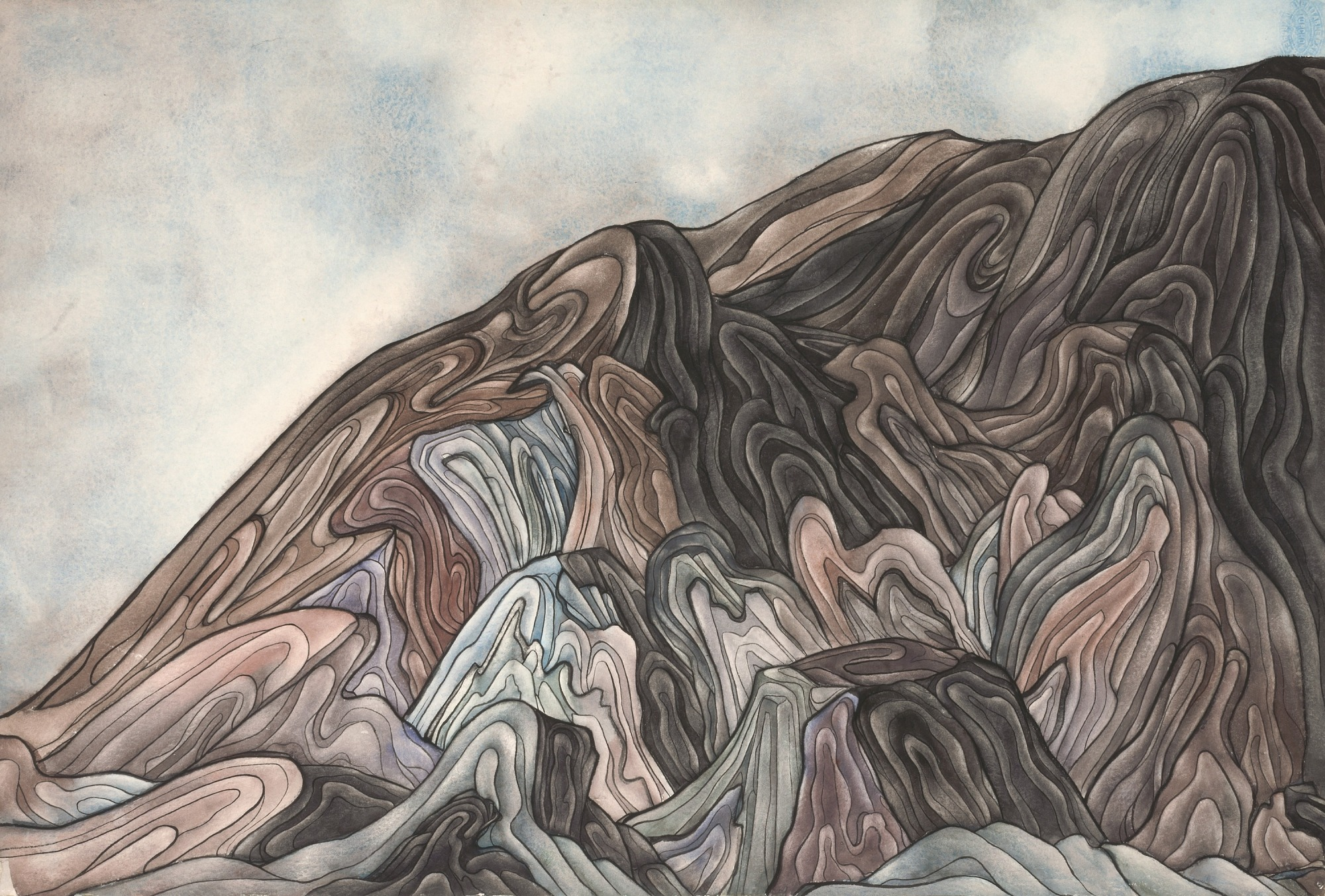
Death Valley ca. 1936

== Biography ==
Henry Cady Wells was born in 1904 in Southbridge, Massachusetts, the son of Channing McGregory Wells, President of the American Optical Company and founder of Old Sturbridge Village. As a young man, he had years of classical training in music, literature and the arts. At first, his interests led him to study music, training to become a concert pianist. Then he shifted to stage design, studying with Joseph Urban, and Norman Bel Geddes. He was afforded all the cultural and educational advantages that a child of a wealthy first generation New England Family could receive. Wells, who was homosexual, was the family rebel. He dropped out of five boarding schools and refused to fit into the plans of his conservative family. He discovered the Southwest when his father sent him to Evans Ranch School in Arizona in 1922. Wells fell in love with the desert and mountain landscapes and began painting them.

In 1932, Wells recognized that his talent lay in the area of painting, which would become his career. He accepted an invitation from artist E Boyd and her husband Eugene Van Cleave to come to Santa Fe, New Mexico. There he began portraying the southwest landscapes in watercolors. He soon became a serious painter, working alongside Andrew Dasburg. He learned the landforms by walking and studying the mountains, mesas, and driftwood, and collecting river rocks.

Japanese and Chinese philosophies and aesthetics deeply influenced Wells while he was in Japan (1935).

His exhibitions were sometimes alongside the work of better known artists such as Mark Tobey, Morris Graves, Adolph Gottlieb, and Jackson Pollock. In addition to Dasburg, he was influenced by Raymond Jonson, and Georgia O'Keeffe.

His art career was interrupted when he entered into the United States Army in 1941, where he worked with topographic maps. He did not paint again until he returned to New Mexico in 1945.

While living in Taos, Wells restored an old Spanish home at Jacona, approximately 20 miles north of Santa Fe. He became known locally for hosting gatherings at the residence and for providing assistance to individuals during the post-Depression and war years, including instances of anonymous support. He developed a wide social network and was active in the social life of Taos and Santa Fe.

Wells was known for his love and contributions to Santa Fe. He served on the board of directors of Santa Fe's School for Advanced Research and helped found the Jonson Gallery in Albuquerque. He gave his collection of some 200 santos to the Museum of New Mexico in 1951, with the condition that a separate department be established for Spanish colonial art. He recommended his friend E Boyd for the job of curator.

Wells died of a stroke in a Santa Fe hospital on November 5, 1954, a few days before his fiftieth birthday.

== Notable exhibitions ==
- 1935-49: Art Institute of Chicago
- 1936: California Palace of the Legion of Honor, San Francisco, CA
- 1939: New Mexico State Fair
- 1956: solo traveling exhibition organized by Museum of New Mexico
- 1967: retrospective exhibition organized by University of New Mexico Art Museum, traveled to Roswell Museum and Art Center, Amon Carter Museum of American Art, Utah Museum of Fine Arts
- 2011: Harwood Museum of Art
