= Frederick R. Weisman Museum of Art =

There are two art museums named after Frederick R. Weisman:

- Frederick R. Weisman Art Museum, Minneapolis, part of the University of Minnesota, Twin Cities
- Frederick R. Weisman Museum of Art, California, part of Pepperdine University

== See also ==
- Frederick R. Weisman Art Foundation in Los Angeles, California
