= Spiritual Moderns: Twentieth-Century American Artists and Religion =

Book by art historian Erika Doss

- Cover
- Author: Erika Doss
- Language: English
- Subject: Art history, religion, American modernism, American religious history, art theory
- Publisher: University of Chicago Press
- Publication date: May 3, 2023
- Media type: Print, e-book
- Pages: 352
- ISBN: 9780226820910

Spiritual Moderns: Twentieth-Century American Artists and Religion is a 2023 book by art historian and American studies scholar Erika Doss, published by the University of Chicago Press. Doss studies the relationship between religion and American modern art through case studies of four twentieth-century American artists—Joseph Cornell, Mark Tobey, Agnes Pelton, and Andy Warhol. Each artist's religious beliefs influenced their modern artistic practices: Cornell with Christian Science, Tobey with the Bahá’í Faith, Pelton with metaphysical movements such as Theosophy, and Warhol with Catholicism. The book analyzes how religious ideas shaped modern art in America and addresses the often overlooked role of spirituality within American modernism. The book was shortlisted for the 2024 Religion and the Arts Book Award from the American Academy of Religion, and was listed one of the best art books of 2023 by Hyperallergic.

== Summary ==
Doss investigates the intersection of religion and modernism in American art by studying the lives and works of four significant twentieth-century American artists—Joseph Cornell, Mark Tobey, Agnes Pelton, and Andy Warhol. Doss argues that each artist exemplifies how religious beliefs and spiritual practices significantly influenced their artistic output, challenging therefore the commonly held assumption that modern art is inherently secular.

The book is organized into focused studies of four artists: Joseph Cornell, known for his assemblage art and association with Christian Science; Mark Tobey, an Abstract Expressionist influenced by the Bahá’í Faith; Agnes Pelton, a Symbolist painter engaged with metaphysical spiritualities such as Theosophy and New Thought; and Andy Warhol, a Pop artist deeply connected to Catholicism. Doss contends that these artists integrated their religious beliefs and practices into their distinct styles, creating spiritually resonant modern art that reflected their personal faith, spiritual exploration, and the social contexts of their times.

By highlighting religion as a significant yet historically overlooked influence on twentieth-century American artists, the author challenges the conventional separation of modern art from spiritual concerns. She situates the artists within broader discussions of American culture, including evolving notions of individual spirituality, religious pluralism, and the cultural controversies that have shaped public responses to religious art.

== Reviews ==
American art historian Elizabeth L. Langhorne considered the book a "convincing challenge to the prevailing omission of religion" in narratives of twentieth-century American modernist art. Langhorne lauded Doss's effectiveness in revealing how understanding artists' spiritual beliefs profoundly enriches interpretations of their art. She considered the work "an exemplary model" for future scholarship examining the intersection of spirituality and American modern art.

William J. Schultz praised the work for thoughtfully revealing how religion had been unjustly erased from the history of modern art. Schultz valued Doss's detailed research of surprising connections between individual artists' spiritual beliefs and their artistic innovations.

Tessa Mediano commended the balanced exploration of faith, artistic movements, and biographical detail, and stressed the author's skillful interplay among these themes. Mediano considered the book a valuable "concise, yet thorough, overview" suitable for library collections.

Brett Esaki appreciated the author's careful use of primary sources and her inquiry on how religion influenced modern art, particularly through marginalized artists who challenged prevailing ideals in the art world. However, Esaki raised concerns regarding Doss's narrow selection of artists and her definition of religion, and suggested that this might limit the broader applicability of her concept of "spiritual moderns." He also critiqued the book for overlooking questions of race, noting the absence of artists of color, which he argued unintentionally conflated "American" identity with whiteness. Esaki said that expanding the selection to include racially diverse artists could have offered richer insights into the intersections of race, religion, and modern art.

Daniel Larkin commended Doss for boldly challenging established narratives by drawing attention to the significant yet often overlooked influence of religion in modern art. Larkin noted that previous accounts had "buried the lead, glossed it over, or outright ignored" this influence, and he appreciated the author's efforts to correct that historical oversight. Larkin criticized the introductory chapters for adopting an overly diplomatic stance on defining modernism and religion, which he felt diluted the potential for a more forceful critique. He said that the analysis effectively exposed entrenched biases in art historiography while inviting further methodological debate.

Teddy Hamstra commended the work for its rigorous recovery of religion's role in modern art, and said that it portrayed modern art as "spiritually affective, embodying wonder, awe, and mystery". Hamstra found the case studies valuable, especially for revealing both the integrative and critical dimensions of artists' religious influences, with particular admiration for the analysis of Agnes Pelton. However, he criticized the treatment of Andy Warhol as overly generous in interpreting his work, which he argued left certain interpretative tensions unresolved.

Daniel Kraft praised Doss for challenging the canonical view that modern art was inherently irreligious by demonstrating that religious traditions deeply informed the aesthetic practices of key modern artists. Kraft said that the analyses showed how an attunement to religious traditions "can deepen the power and meaning of even ostensibly secular art," particularly through detailed case studies of figures such as Warhol and Tobey. However, he observed that the author's insistence on a rigid distinction between "religious artists" and modern artists who were religious raised unresolved tensions, and he concluded that this definitional ambiguity left significant questions for further inquiry.
