= They Stood Up for Love =

2000 single by Live

Single by Live

from the album The Distance to Here
- Released: June 26, 2000
- Studio: The Site (San Rafael, California); Village Recorder (West Los Angeles); A&M (Hollywood, California); The Plant (Sausalito, California)
- Length: 4:17
- Label: Radioactive
- Songwriters: Ed Kowalczyk; Patrick Dahlheimer; Chad Taylor
- Producers: Jerry Harrison; Live

Live singles chronology
| "Run to the Water" (2000) | "They Stood Up for Love" (2000) | "Simple Creed" (2001) |

Music video
- "They Stood Up for Love" on YouTube

"They Stood Up for Love" is a song by American alternative rock group Live, which was released as the third and final single from their 1999 album, The Distance to Here. The song was released in the United States on June 26, 2000, and reached number 31 on the Billboard Modern Rock Tracks chart and number 24 on the Billboard Mainstream Rock Tracks chart.

The European single releases of "They Stood Up for Love" include an acoustic version of the song recorded at Jet Studios in Brussels, Belgium, in April 2000. This version was successful in the Flanders region of Belgium, reaching number one for two weeks, and it also peaked at number 19 in the Netherlands. It was Flanders' fourth-highest-selling single of 2000.

== Music video ==
The video for "They Stood Up for Love" was directed by Kai Sehr and features the band performing the song in a recording studio. This footage is interspersed with film of young people partying. The two strands come together as the people from the increasingly wild party join the band in the studio.

== Track listings ==
Australian CD single

1. "They Stood Up for Love" (radio mix)
2. "Run to the Water" (acoustic version)
3. "The Distance" (acoustic version) – 4:39
4. "The Dolphin's Cry" (acoustic version) – 5:15
5. "I Alone" (acoustic version) – 4:00
6. "They Stood Up for Love" (acoustic version) – 4:17

European CD single 1

1. "They Stood Up for Love" (acoustic version, recorded at Jet Studios, Brussels, Belgium) – 4:02
2. "They Stood Up for Love" (radio mix) – 4:13

European CD single 2

1. "They Stood Up for Love" (radio mix)
2. "I Alone" (acoustic version)
3. "The Dolphin's Cry" (acoustic version)
4. "They Stood Up for Love" (acoustic version)

European maxi-CD single

1. "They Stood Up for Love" (radio mix)
2. "Run to the Water" (acoustic version)
3. "The Distance" (acoustic version)
4. "They Stood Up for Love" (acoustic version)

== Credits and personnel ==
Credits are lifted from the US promo CD liner notes and The Distance to Here album booklet.

Studios

- Recorded at The Site (San Rafael, California), Village Recorder (West Los Angeles), A&M Studios (Hollywood, California), and The Plant (Sausalito, California)
- Mixed at South Beach Studios (Miami Beach, Florida) and Encore Studios (Burbank, California)
- Mastered at Sterling Sound (New York City)

Live

- Ed Kowalczyk – writing, vocals, guitar
- Patrick Dahlheimer – writing, bass
- Chad Taylor – writing, lead guitars
- Chad Gracey – drums
- Live – production

Other personnel

- Jerry Harrison – production
- Gary Kurfirst – executive production
- Tom Lord-Alge – mixing
- Karl Derfler – engineering
- Doug McKean – additional engineering
- Ted Jensen – mastering

== Charts ==
=== Weekly charts ===
| Chart (2000) | Peak position |
|---|---|
| Australia (ARIA) | 88 |
| Belgium (Ultratop 50 Flanders) | 1 |
| Netherlands (Dutch Top 40) | 19 |
| Netherlands (Single Top 100) | 44 |
| US Alternative Airplay (Billboard) | 31 |
| US Mainstream Rock (Billboard) | 24 |

=== Year-end charts ===
| Chart (2000) | Position |
|---|---|
| Belgium (Ultratop 50 Flanders) | 4 |

== Certifications ==
| Region | Certification | Certified units/sales |
|---|---|---|
| Belgium (BRMA) | Gold | 25,000^{*} |
^{*} Sales figures based on certification alone.
