= Jonson Gallery =

- Jonson Gallery and House
- U.S. National Register of Historic Places
- NM State Register of Cultural Properties
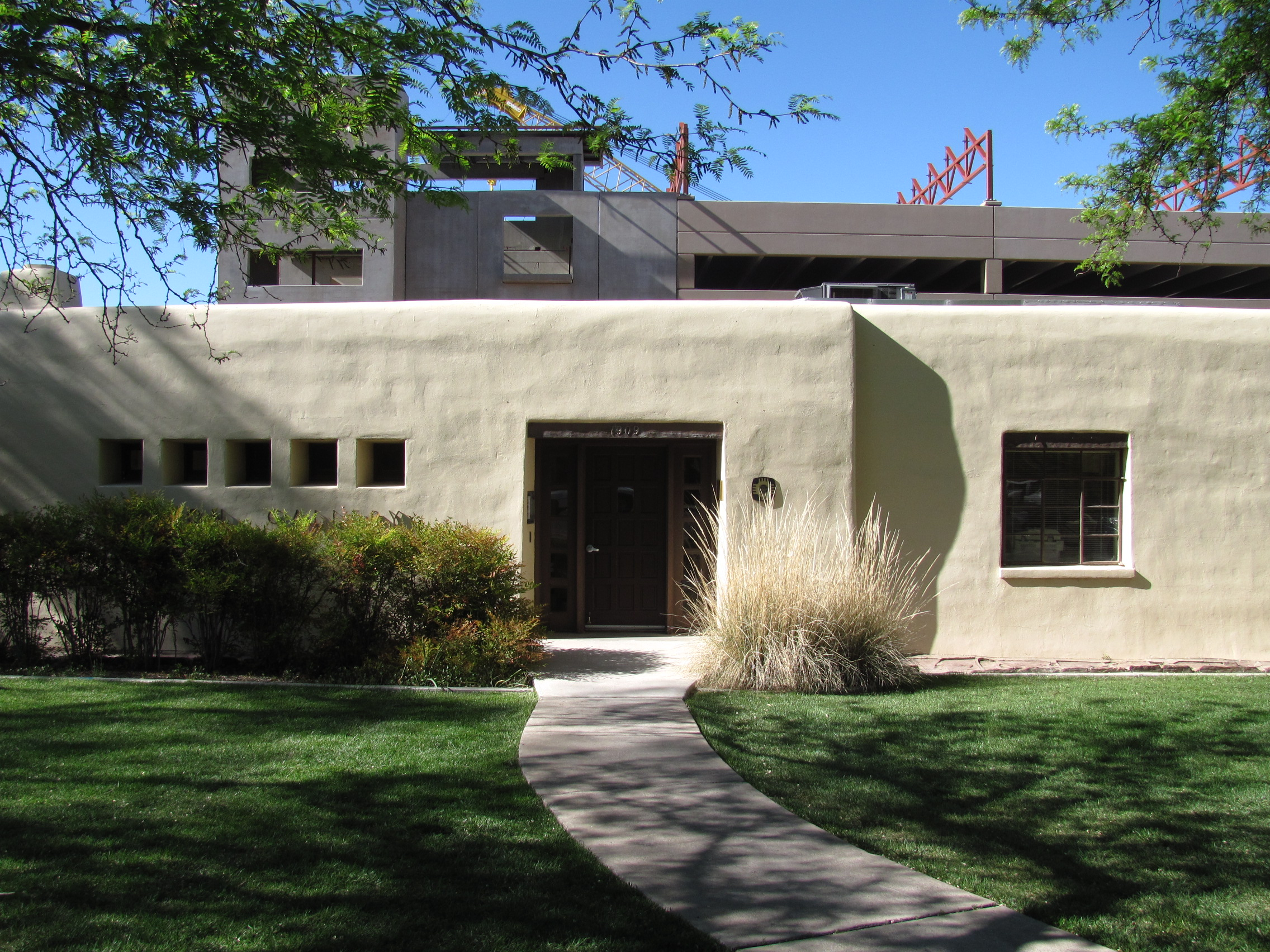
- Jonson Gallery in 2010

- Location within New Mexico Location within the United States
- Location: 1909 Las Lomas Rd. NE, Albuquerque, New Mexico
- Coordinates: 35°05′13″N 106°37′15″W
- Built: 1950
- Architect: John Gaw Meem
- Architectural style: Pueblo Revival
- NRHP reference No.: 02000050
- NMSRCP No.: 1805

Significant dates
- Added to NRHP: February 22, 2002
- Designated NMSRCP: November 30, 2001

The Jonson Gallery is a historic building on the campus of the University of New Mexico in Albuquerque, New Mexico, which was completed in 1950 as a combination home and gallery for the modernist painter Raymond Jonson. During Jonson's lifetime and afterwards, the gallery was a center for modern and abstract art in New Mexico, as well as housing a large collection of Jonson's own works. In 2009, the gallery's collections were absorbed into the University of New Mexico Art Museum and the former gallery building was converted to office space.

The Jonson Gallery is a relatively sparse Pueblo Revival style building designed by John Gaw Meem, who also designed several other buildings on the university campus. It sits on a hillside with one story above grade in the front and two in the back. The front elevation consists of a main horizontal volume, with a centered front entrance flanked by asymmetrical windows, and a lower wing projecting to the west. Steel casement windows with concrete sills are used throughout. The upper floor housed Jonson's residence, while the gallery space was on the lower floor. Multiple additions were constructed at the rear of the building over the years.
