= The Fort (Morrison, Colorado) =

Coordinates: 39°37′44.17″N 105°11′33.09″W

- U.S. National Register of Historic Places
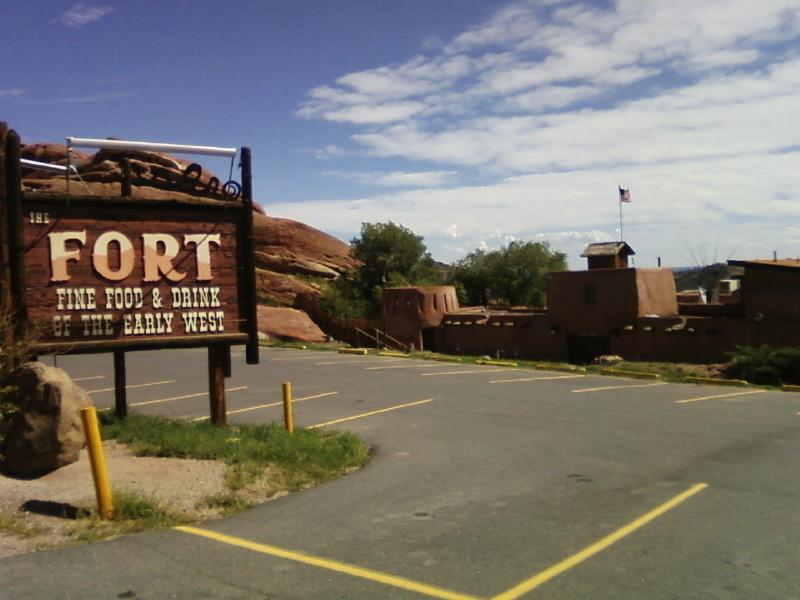
- Location: 19192 CO 8, Morrison, Colorado
- Architect: William Lumpkins
- Architectural style: Pueblo Revival Style architecture
- NRHP reference No.: 06000585 (original); 100005379 (increase)

Significant dates
- Added to NRHP: July 14, 2006
- Boundary increase: July 27, 2020

The Fort is a historic restaurant in Morrison, Colorado. Construction of the structure started in 1961 and was inspired by Bent's Fort.

== History ==
The adobe structure was built between 1961 and 1963 for Denver advertising executive Sam Arnold. A replica of Bent's Fort, the structure incorporates over 80,000 handmade adobe bricks and beams hewn with drawknives, foot adzes and hand planes. Originally planned as a living history museum that would also be a home for the Arnold family, the Arnolds pivoted to finishing the first floor as a restaurant to secure Small Business Administration funding to complete the interior of the building.

The 300-seat, Western-themed restaurant opened in the building's first floor on February 1, 1963. Arnold developed menu items based on ingredients available in Colorado at the time of Bent's Fort and promoted frontier cookery with the public television series Frying Pans West. After marrying for the second time, Arnold sold the restaurant in 1973. The restaurant was returned to him in foreclosure in 1986. The restaurant hosted President Bill Clinton’s state dinner for the 23rd G8 summit in 1997.

Following the death of his second wife in 1998, Arnold's daughter Holly Arnold Kinney purchased 49% of the operating business in partnership with her father, who owned 51% in December 1999. Ms. Kinney downsized her media company, Arnold Media Services, Inc., to become the full manager/operator of The Fort to run the restaurant with him until his death in 2006. Kinney purchased the real property out of his estate in 2006, and became the sole owner/operator of the restaurant and property. She also founded the Tesoro Cultural Center, in 1999, a nonprofit that sponsors an Indian Market and Powwow and other cultural events at the Fort, until it was dissolved in 2025, due to Ms. Kinney's retirement. Dedicated to historic preservation, Ms. Kinney had The Fort listed on the National Registry of Historic Places, in 2006, and had a voluntary historic easement placed on the property held by the Colorado Historical Foundation in 2025. In January 6, 2026, Ms. Kinney retired and sold the restaurant and property to Revesco Properties and City Street Investors.

== Cuisine ==
The Fort's menu features local ingredients and regional game, particularly bison, elk, and quail. Recipes are inspired by a 3,000-volume rare and historic cookbook library amassed by Sam Arnold, with additions made through a semi-annual process that considers new ideas from the restaurant's kitchen staff.

== See also ==
- National Register of Historic Places listings in Jefferson County, Colorado
