= Erika Doss =

American educator

Erika Lee Doss is an American educator and author. She is the EODIAH Distinguished Chair in Art History at the Edith O'Donnell Institute of Art History of the University of Texas at Dallas. Formerly, she was a professor at the University of Colorado Boulder and the University of Notre Dame.

Doss received her Ph.D. from the University of Minnesota in 1983, and "has held fellowships at the Stanford Humanities Center, Georgia O'Keeffe Museum Research Center, Smithsonian American Art Museum, Rockwell Center for American Visual Studies, and Crystal Bridges Museum of American Art".

In her 1999 book, Elvis Culture: Fans, Faith, and Image, Doss examines the enduring popularity of singer Elvis Presley. Spiritual Moderns: Twentieth-Century American Artists and Religion (University of Chicago Press, 2023) was listed as one of the top 20 art books of 2023 by Hyperallergic.
