= Transcendental Painting Group =

Artist collective established in 1938

The Transcendental Painting Group (TPG) was an artist collective, established in 1938 in Taos, New Mexico. The group's goal was to provide an alternative to the prevailing currents of social realism and regionalism that dominated art in the 1930s United States. Under the leadership of Raymond Jonson and Emil Bisttram, the artist group consisted of Agnes Pelton, Lawren Harris, Florence Miller Pierce, Horace Pierce, Robert Gribbroek, William Lumpkins, and Dane Rudhyar. Most of the members lived and worked in New Mexico, with the exception of Agnes Pelton, who was active in Southern California.

== Goals and aesthetics ==
The group sought to produce artwork that would go beyond the superficial physical world. Their manifesto formulated their intention "… to carry painting beyond the appearance of the physical world, through new concepts of space, color, light and design, to imaginative realms that are idealistic and spiritual." Stylistically they were strongly inspired by theosophy, the ethereal art of Wassily Kandinsky and the mysticism of Nicolas Roerich. They frequently employed geometric compositions resembling constructivism and Bauhaus, but combined with vibrant colours and musical rhythms. The work of the TPG often had synesthetic qualities in an attempt to convey a transcendent, cosmic experience. The group understood their art as an expression of a spiritual appreciation of reality.

== Manifesto ==
The Transcendental Painting Group was established with the aim to present and encourage a pure abstract art style, brimming with spiritual intent. The following is the group's manifesto, which was published in 1997 by the Jonson Gallery, University of New Mexico, with the title Vision and Spirit, The Transcendental Painting Group:

The Transcendental Painting Group is composed of artists who are concerned with the development and presentation of various types of non-representational painting; painting that finds its source in the creative imagination and does not depend upon the objective approach.

The word "transcendental" has been chosen as the name for the group because it best expresses the aims, which are; to carry painting beyond the appearance of the physical world, through new concepts of space, color, light and design, upon planes that are termed idealistic and spiritual. The work of the group does not concern itself with political, economic or other materialistic problems. Methods may vary. Some will approach transcendental problems by a scientific balancing of the elements involved; others will rely upon the initial emotion produced by the creative urge itself; still others will be impelled by a metaphysical motivation. Doubtless as the group grows other methods will appear.

The Transcendental Painting Group is no coterie, no accidental group of friends. The members are convinced that a focal point is necessary if a type of art transcending the objective and expressing the cultural development of the human race in this century is to be adequately presented.

The present activity of the group will be toward arranging exhibitions of work and acquainting the public with the aims of the group through articles and statements in magazines and newspapers: to make known this aspect of painting which, developed in its various phases, will serve to widen the horizon of art.

The group remained active until 1942 and gained only modest recognition in its time. Recently, however, it has been reappraised, through exhibitions such as Another World: The Transcendental Painting Group, 1938–1945, arranged by the Crocker Art Museum in Sacramento. This exhibition, which has also been shown at the Los Angeles County Museum of Art (LACMA) and other venues, introduced the public to the visionary and spiritual aspects of the TPG's art.

== Bibliography ==
- Michael Duncan et al.: Another World: The Transcendental Painting Group, 1938–1945, Albuquerque Museum, 2022.
