= Overcome (Live song) =

2001 single by Live

Single by Live

from the album V
- Released: December 3, 2001
- Genre: Acoustic rock
- Length: 4:16
- Label: Radioactive
- Songwriter: Ed Kowalczyk
- Producer: Live

Live singles chronology
| "Simple Creed" (2001) | "Overcome" (2001) | "Forever May Not Be Long Enough" (2002) |

"Overcome" is a song by the American rock band Live that was released as the second single from their 2001 album, V. In the United States, the September 11 attacks were a catalyst for the song's addition to radio despite not receiving an official release there. The song peaked at number 30 on the US Billboard Modern Rock Tracks chart and became a top-three hit in the Netherlands and the Flanders region of Belgium.

== Background ==
The song became associated with the September 11 attacks on the United States. Proceeds from the sales of the single were donated to charities to benefit the victims of the attack.

== Chart performance ==
The song was a hit in Flanders and the Netherlands, peaking at number three in both regions. It was not released as a single in the US but reached number 30 on the Billboard Modern Rock Tracks chart. Its charting in the United States is due to a RealAudio remix of the song featuring actualities from the September 11 attacks gaining attention online, which resulted in rock radio stations adding "Overcome" to their playlists in late September 2001. In Australia, the song peaked at number 68 in January 2002.

== Music videos ==
The song spawned three music videos.

The first version was created by Steven Rosenbaum, founder and CEO of production company CameraPlanet, and consists of footage Rosenbaum's seven camera crews had shot around Ground Zero on September 11, 2001. During that day, Rosenbaum had heard "Overcome" on the radio—the song had been picked up by several stations in the wake of the attacks—and in the evening he started editing the footage to the song. On September 13, after a total of seven hours of editing, he showed the finished video to a friend at VH1 which put it into rotation within an hour. It was subsequently also picked up by VH1's sister station MTV and both channels played it, along with only a handful of other videos, for close to a week.

After having seen the video, of whose existence they had no prior knowledge, on TV, the band decided to create their own version. They enlisted director Mary Lambert (who worked pro bono) to film singer Ed Kowalczyk performing the song under falling water in a Los Angeles studio on September 18. This material was then intercut with footage of world leaders and children from all over the world as well as clips of the aftermath of the September 11 attacks and other world events along with famous quotations such as "Imagine World Peace" and "The Only Thing We Have to Fear Is Fear Itself".

Being informed, on September 19, by the band's manager, Chris Harden, of the studio shoot, Rosenbaum objected: "[I]f you're gonna make a video, it has to feel honest, and putting something from the studio over those pictures is just wrong." Kowalczyk agreed, flew to New York the same day, and that evening Rosenbaum and his wife filmed him visiting Ground Zero, a fire station and various memorials. An a cappella version was recorded in front of the smoking remains of the WTC. Clips of that footage were then interspersed into Rosenbaum's original video. Only this video was released on the Awake: The Best of Live DVD.

== Track listings ==
=== Australian and German CD singles ===
1. "Overcome" – 4:16
2. "Overcome" (Acoustic Version) – 3:01
3. "Simple Creed" (Acoustic Version) – 3:22
4. "Overcome" (Video)

=== European CD single ===
1. "Overcome" – 4:16
2. "Overcome" (Acoustic Version) – 3:00

== Charts ==
=== Weekly charts ===
| Chart (2001–2002) | Peak position |
|---|---|
| Australia (ARIA) | 68 |
| Belgium (Ultratop 50 Flanders) | 2 |
| Dutch Airplay (Aircheck Nederland) | 1 |
| Netherlands (Dutch Top 40) | 2 |
| Netherlands (Single Top 100) | 3 |
| US Alternative Airplay (Billboard) | 30 |

=== Year-end charts ===
| Chart (2001) | Position |
|---|---|
| Belgium (Ultratop 50 Flanders) | 38 |
| Netherlands (Dutch Top 40) | 35 |
| Netherlands (Single Top 100) | 22 |

=== Decade-end charts ===
| Chart (2000–2009) | Position |
|---|---|
| Netherlands (Single Top 100) | 82 |

== Use in film and television ==
- "Overcome" was used in the FX TV show The Shield, featuring in the season 2 finale, "Dominoes Falling."
- "Overcome" was used in the opening minutes of E:60 Presents - Comeback Season: Sports After 9/11.
