= Simple Creed =

2001 single by Live

Single by Live featuring Tricky

from the album V
- B-side: "Shit Towne" (live); "Sparkle" (live)
- Released: July 24, 2001
- Length: 3:26
- Label: Radioactive
- Songwriters: Ed Kowalczyk; Tricky

Live featuring Tricky singles chronology
"They Stood Up for Love" (2000)	"Simple Creed" (2001)	"Overcome" (2001)

"Simple Creed" is a song by American alternative rock group Live, released as the first single from their fifth studio album, V. The song features vocals by English rapper Tricky.

== Chart performance ==
In the United States, "Simple Creed" peaked at No. 18 on the Billboard Modern Rock Tracks chart and No. 11 on the Mainstream Rock Tracks chart. The song also reached No. 18 in the Netherlands and No. 43 in Australia.

== Music video ==
The music video for "Simple Creed" was directed by Marc Webb. It features the band performing the song outdoors, cut with footage of two men fighting as they are urged on by a crowd of onlookers. The fight ends as one of the combatants appears to see the error of his ways. He begins walking and is followed by a large group of young people. When the rap section begins, the video cuts to a young man in his living room watching Tricky perform his section of the song on TV. The band finish performing the song as the sun sets. The final shot is of the now very large group of young people standing behind the band members in a suburban street.

== Track listings ==
Australian and German CD single

1. "Simple Creed" – 3:26
2. "Shit Towne" (live version) – 4:40
3. "Sparkle" (live version) – 5:26

Dutch CD single

1. "Simple Creed" – 3:26
2. "Shit Towne" (live version) – 4:37

== Charts ==
=== Weekly charts ===
Weekly chart performance for "Simple Creed"
Chart (2001)	Peak position
Australia (ARIA)	43
Belgium (Ultratip Bubbling Under Flanders)	4
Netherlands (Dutch Top 40)	8
Netherlands (Single Top 100)	18
US Mainstream Rock Tracks (Billboard)	11
US Modern Rock Tracks (Billboard)	18

=== Year-end charts ===
Year-end chart performance for "Simple Creed"
Chart (2001)	Position
US Modern Rock Tracks (Billboard)	85

== Release history ==
Release dates and formats for "Simple Creed"
Region	Date	Format(s)	Label(s)	Ref.
United States	July 24, 2001	Mainstream rock; active rock radio	Radioactive	
Australia	August 27, 2001	CD	Radioactive	
