= Sweet Release =

Single by Live

from the album Birds of Pray
- Released: October 6, 2003
- Length: 3:04
- Label: Radioactive Records
- Songwriter: Ed Kowalczyk
- Producer: Jim Wirt

Live singles chronology
"Heaven" (2003)	"Sweet Release" (2003)	"Run Away" (2004)

"Sweet Release" is a song by alternative rock group Live, which was released as the second single from their 2003 album, Birds of Pray. It was only released in Australia, where it peaked at #61 and spent 11 weeks in the ARIA top 100 singles chart.

== Track listings ==
All songs by Ed Kowalczyk, except where noted:

=== Australian CD single ===
1. "Sweet Release" – 3:04
2. "Lighthouse" (Live at Vorst Nationaal) (Kowalczyk, Chad Taylor) – 3:06
3. "The Beauty of Gray" (Live at Vorst Nationaal) – 4:24
4. "They Stood Up for Love" (Live at Vorst Nationaal) (Kowalczyk, Patrick Dahlheimer, Taylor)– 5:03
5. "Heaven" (Live at Vorst National) (Video) – 4:31

== Charts ==
Chart (2003)	Peak position
Australia (ARIA)	61
