= Turn My Head =

Single by Live

from the album Secret Samadhi
- Released: August 1997
- Length: 3:45
- Label: Radioactive
- Songwriter: Live
- Producers: Jay Healy; Live

Live singles chronology
| "Freaks" (1997) | "Turn My Head" (1997) | "Rattlesnake" (1997) |

"Turn My Head" is a song by alternative rock group Live, which was released as a single from their 1997 album, Secret Samadhi. In contrast to the hard rock of most of the album, the song is slower-paced and features a string section.

The song was not released as single in the US, but it still received significant airplay, reaching No. 45 on the Billboard Hot 100 Airplay chart, and No. 3 on both the Modern Rock Tracks and Mainstream Rock Tracks charts.

== Track listings ==
Lyrics by Ed Kowalczyk, music by Live:

=== Australian CD single ===
1. "Turn My Head" (Radio Edit) – 3:45
2. "Rattlesnake" (Live) – 5:04
3. "Freaks" (Labor, Labor, Labor Remix) – 6:48

=== European CD single ===
1. "Turn My Head" (Radio Edit) – 3:45
2. "Turn My Head" (Live) – 4:10

=== German CD single ===
1. "Turn My Head" (Radio Edit) – 3:45
2. "Lakini's Juice" (Remix) – 7:41
3. "Turn My Head" (Live) – 4:08

== Music videos ==
Two official music videos were created for the song. The first featured the band performing the song and was directed by Mary Lambert. The second video was directed by Jake Scott and was inspired by the paintings of John Register. Both videos were included on the DVD release of Live's compilation, Awake: The Best of Live.

== Chart positions ==
"Turn My Head" reached N0. 16 in Canada, No. 36 in Austria, No. 47 in Australia and No. 67 in the Netherlands.
