= William Lumpkins =

American artist and architect (1909–2000)

William T. Lumpkins
- Born: April 8, 1909; Rabbit Ears Ranch, New Mexico
- Died: March 20, 2000 (aged 90); Santa Fe, New Mexico
- Education: University of Southern California, University of New Mexico
- Known for: Painting, architecture
- Style: abstract, abstract expressionist
- Movement: Transcendental Painting Group

William Lumpkins (1909–2000) was an American artist and architect best known for his abstract watercolors and pioneering solar adobe architecture. He was a founding member of the Transcendental Painting Group and cofounder of the Santa Fe Art Institute with Pony Ault.

== Early life and education ==
William Thomas Lumpkins was born on April 8, 1909, at Rabbit Ears Ranch in Territorial New Mexico, one of five children born to Julia and William Lumpkins. In 1929 he graduated from Roswell High School, where he had met and befriended artist Peter Hurd. He studied art at the University of New Mexico and architecture at University of Southern California.

== Architecture career ==
Bill Lumpkins was an early proponent of passive solar design, having built his first passive solar house in Capitan, NM in 1935. The former residence of solar scientist Dr. J. Douglas Balcomb in Santa Fe, designed by Lumpkins with his company Sun Mountain Design, is considered by many the "quintessential solar adobe house." Lumpkins' adobe building designs were featured in the 1982 exhibition "Des Architecture de Terre" held at the Centre Georges Pompidou and were the subject of a book, Pueblo Architecture and Modern Adobes : The Residential Designs of William Lumpkins.

Lumpkins' architectural work also included many restoration projects in New Mexico, including Santa Fe's Santuario de Guadalupe and hotel La Fonda.

Other buildings Lumpkins designed include:

- William Black House
- Athenaeum Music & Arts Library
- The Fort

== Painting career ==
Lumpkins started exhibiting his paintings in 1932, most of which were watercolors. He met artist Raymond Jonson in Santa Fe in 1935, and exhibited with Jonson and other members of the Transcendental Painting Group from 1938 to 1942. Lumpkins was one of the earlier Abstract Expressionists, having employed the style about a decade before other American artists popularized it . His work has been exhibited at commercial art galleries, California Palace of the Legion of Honor, 1939 New York World's Fair, and New Mexico Museum of Art

== Public collections ==
- Museum of Fine Arts Boston
- New Mexico Museum of Art
- Museum of Contemporary Art San Diego
- Roswell Museum and Art Center
- The Albuquerque Museum

== Writings ==
Lumpkins wrote three books about Southwestern architecture :

- Modern Spanish-Pueblo Homes. OCLC 5258577.
- La Casa Adobe. OCLC 3254674. and
- Casa del Sol. OCLC 8078645.

== Legacy ==
In 1985 Lumpkins was awarded the New Mexico Governor's Award for Excellence in the Arts for both art and architecture. The Lumpkins Ballroom at the La Fonda hotel in Santa Fe was named after him.
