= Secret Samadhi =

Studio album by Live
- Released: February 18, 1997
- Recorded: 1996
- Studio: The Hit Factory (New York City): South Beach (Miami); The Record Plant (Los Angeles)
- Genre: Alternative rock, post-grunge, hard rock
- Length: 53:18
- Label: Radioactive
- Producer: Jay Healy, Live

Live chronology
Throwing Copper (1994)	Secret Samadhi (1997)	The Distance to Here (1999)

Singles from Secret Samadhi
- 1. "Lakini's Juice" Released: January 20, 1997; 2. "Freaks" Released: May 5, 1997; 3. "Turn My Head" Released: August 1997

Professional ratings
Review scores
Source	Rating
AllMusic	2.5/5 stars
The Encyclopedia of Popular Music	3/5 stars
Entertainment Weekly	C+
Kerrang!	4/5 stars
Metal Hammer	4/5 stars
Pitchfork	7.5/10
Rolling Stone	3/5 stars
The Rolling Stone Album Guide	2.5/5 stars
Spin	6/10
Wall of Sound	83/100

Secret Samadhi is the third studio album by American alternative rock band Live. It debuted at number 1 on the Billboard 200 upon its release on February 18, 1997. It includes the singles "Lakini's Juice", "Turn My Head" and "Freaks". The album was certified 2× Platinum by the RIAA on July 8, 1999.

This is the first Live recording to be produced by Jay Healy since their 1990 cassette EP Divided Mind, Divided Planet.

The US release uses HDCD encoding, but the package is not labeled as HDCD.

== Track listing ==
All lyrics are written by Ed Kowalczyk; all music is composed by Live.

No.	Title	Length
1.	"Rattlesnake"	4:51
2.	"Lakini's Juice"	4:59
3.	"Graze"	5:39
4.	"Century"	3:22
5.	"Ghost"	6:19
6.	"Unsheathed"	3:36
7.	"Insomnia and the Hole in the Universe"	4:01
8.	"Turn My Head"	3:57
9.	"Heropsychodreamer"	2:48
10.	"Freaks"	4:50
11.	"Merica"	3:21
12.	"Gas Hed Goes West"	5:35

== Personnel ==
Live

- Ed Kowalczyk – lead vocals, rhythm guitar
- Chad Taylor – lead guitar, backing vocals
- Patrick Dahlheimer – bass
- Chad Gracey – drums

Additional musicians

- Tim Bauber – engineering
- Jon Carin – keyboards
- Jennifer Charles – vocals on "Ghost"
- Jay Healy – engineering, production
- Femio Hernandez – engineering, production
- Ted Jensen – mastering
- Doug Katsaros – string arrangements on "Lakini's Juice" and "Turn My Head"
- Gerardo Lopez – engineering, production
- Tom Lord-Alge – mixing
- Greg Thompson – engineering, production

== Charts ==
=== Weekly charts ===
Chart (1997)	Peak position
Australian Albums (ARIA)	2
Austrian Albums (Ö3 Austria)	10
Belgian Albums (Ultratop Flanders)	3
Belgian Albums (Ultratop Wallonia)	27
Canadian Albums (Billboard)	1
Dutch Albums (Album Top 100)	4
Finnish Albums (Suomen virallinen lista)	15
German Albums (Offizielle Top 100)	23
New Zealand Albums (RMNZ)	1
Norwegian Albums (VG-lista)	5
Scottish Albums (Official Charts)	27
Swedish Albums (Sverigetopplistan)	8
Swiss Albums (Schweizer Hitparade)	17
UK Albums (Official Charts)	31
US Billboard 200	1

=== Year-end charts ===
Chart (1997)	Position
Australian Albums (ARIA)	12
Belgian Albums (Ultratop Flanders)	49
Canadian Albums (Nielsen Soundscan)	29
Dutch Albums (Album Top 100)	14
New Zealand Albums (RMNZ)	12
US Billboard 200	42

=== Singles ===
Song	Peak chart positions					
Song	US Mod.	AUS	AUT	NED	NZ	UK
"Lakini's Juice"	1	21	—	69	37	29
"Freaks"	13	36	—	80	—	60
"Turn My Head"	3	47	36	67	—	—
"Rattlesnake"	18	—	—	—	—	—
"—" denotes releases that did not chart

== Certifications ==
Region	Certification	Certified units/sales
Australia (ARIA)	2× Platinum	140,000^{^}
Canada (Music Canada)	2× Platinum	200,000^{^}
Netherlands (NVPI)	Platinum	100,000^{^}
New Zealand (RMNZ)	Platinum	15,000^{^}
United States (RIAA)	2× Platinum	2,000,000^{^}
^{^} Shipments figures based on certification alone.
