= V (Live album) =

Studio album by Live
- Released: September 18, 2001
- Recorded: 11 AD Studios, Hollywood, CA
- Genres: Alternative rock; post-grunge; hard rock
- Length: 52:31
- Label: Radioactive
- Producers: Live, Michael Railo, Alain Johannes

Live chronology
The Distance to Here (1999)	V (2001)	Birds of Pray (2003)

Singles from V
- 1. "Simple Creed" Released: September 25, 2001; 2. "Overcome" Released: December 11, 2001; 3. "Forever May Not Be Long Enough" Released: 2002

Professional ratings
Aggregate scores
Source	Rating
Metacritic	60/100
Review scores
Source	Rating
AllMusic	4/5 stars
Blender	2/5 stars
Entertainment Weekly	C+
Q	2/5 stars
Rolling Stone	3.5/5 stars
The Rolling Stone Album Guide	3.5/5 stars
Spin	(5/10)

V is the fifth studio album by the American rock band Live, released in 2001. It featured the singles "Simple Creed" and "Overcome", the latter of which received significant exposure following the September 11 attacks.

== History ==
The collection of songs that became V was never intended to be released as an album. Guitarist Chad Taylor said, "The goal was to prepare songs for the next studio session. MCA got a hold of the material and pushed us to call it an album." The songs were originally going to be released free to fans as a collection called Ecstatic Fanatic. The tracks included two songs featured in films released prior to the release of V, "Forever May Not Be Long Enough", written for the closing credits of The Mummy Returns, and "Deep Enough", which appears in the opening of The Fast and the Furious because director Rob Cohen was a fan of Live. Taylor would later express dismay at the label's disinterest in promoting those two songs, particularly in light of the box office success of both films. V only reached number 22 on the album chart in the US and failed to attain gold status, despite reasonably positive reviews.

== Track listing ==
All tracks are written by Ed Kowalczyk, except where noted.

V
No.	Title	Length
1.	"Intro"	0:37
2.	"Simple Creed" (Kowalczyk, Tricky)	3:24
3.	"Deep Enough"	3:19
4.	"Like a Soldier"	3:12
5.	"People Like You"	3:17
6.	"Transmit Your Love"	4:35
7.	"Forever May Not Be Long Enough" (Kowalczyk, Glen Ballard)	3:49
8.	"Call Me a Fool"	2:38
9.	"Flow"	3:30
10.	"The Ride"	3:54
11.	"Nobody Knows"	4:26
12.	"OK?"	3:11
13.	"Overcome"	4:16
14.	"Hero of Love"	5:12
15.	"Deep Enough" (remix, bonus track, unlisted)	3:11
Total length:		49:23

== Personnel ==
Live

- Ed Kowalczyk – lead vocals, rhythm guitar
- Chad Taylor – lead guitar, backing vocals
- Patrick Dahlheimer – bass
- Chad Gracey – drums

Additional personnel

- Adam Duritz – backing vocals on "Flow"
- Alain Johannes – "Intro" concept, sitar on "The Ride"
- Adam Kowalczyk – rhythm guitar, backing vocals
- Michael "Railo" Railton – keyboards, backing vocals
- Natasha Schneider – backing vocals on "People Like You"
- Tricky – vocals on "Simple Creed"
- Shawn Williams – bass on "Flow"
- Michael “Railo” Railton – string arrangements on “Nobody Knows”, “Overcome”, and “Hero Of Love”.

== Charts ==
=== Weekly charts ===
Chart (2001)	Peak position
Australian Albums (ARIA)	1
Austrian Albums (Ö3 Austria)	24
Belgian Albums (Ultratop Flanders)	2
Canadian Albums (Billboard)	5
Danish Albums (Hitlisten)	22
Dutch Albums (Album Top 100)	1
Finnish Albums (Suomen virallinen lista)	23
German Albums (Offizielle Top 100)	17
New Zealand Albums (RMNZ)	1
Norwegian Albums (VG-lista)	1
Scottish Albums (Official Charts)	75
Swedish Albums (Sverigetopplistan)	6
Swiss Albums (Schweizer Hitparade)	37
UK Albums (Official Charts)	80
US Billboard 200	22

=== Year-end charts ===
Year-end chart performance for V by Live
Chart (2001)	Position
Australian Albums (ARIA)	53
Belgian Albums (Ultratop Flanders)	32
Canadian Albums (Nielsen SoundScan)	184
Dutch Albums (Album Top 100)	8

=== Singles ===
Song	Peak chart positions			
Song	US Mod.	AUS	BEL (FL)	NED
"Simple Creed"	18	43	—^{[A]}	18
"Overcome"	30	—	2	3
"Forever May Not Be Long Enough"	—	—	—^{[B]}	59
"—" denotes releases that did not chart

- A: "Simple Creed" did not chart on the Flemish Ultratop 50, but peaked at number 4 on the Ultratip chart.
- B: "Forever May Not Be Long Enough" did not chart on the Flemish Ultratop 50, but peaked at number 18 on the Ultratip chart.

== Certifications ==
Region	Certification	Certified units/sales
Australia (ARIA)	Gold	35,000^{^}
Belgium (BRMA)	Gold	25,000^{*}
Netherlands (NVPI)	Platinum	80,000^{^}
New Zealand (RMNZ)	Gold	7,500^{^}
^{*} Sales figures based on certification alone.^{^} Shipments figures based on certification alone.
