= The Distance to Here =

Studio album by Live
- Released: October 5, 1999
- Recorded: At the Site, Village Recorder, A&M Studios and the Plant
- Genres: Hard rock, post-grunge
- Length: 56:04
- Label: Radioactive
- Producers: Jerry Harrison, Live

Live chronology
Secret Samadhi (1997)	The Distance to Here (1999)	V (2001)

Singles from The Distance to Here
- 1. "The Dolphin's Cry" Released: August 24, 1999; 2. "Run to the Water" Released: January 11, 2000; 3. "They Stood Up for Love" Released: June 26, 2000

Professional ratings
Review scores
Source	Rating
AllMusic	3/5 stars
Entertainment Weekly	C+
Rolling Stone	3.5/5 stars
The Rolling Stone Album Guide	2/5 stars

Ed Kowalczyk discussing The Distance to Here in 2000

The Distance to Here is the fourth studio album by the band Live, released in 1999. It debuted at #4 on the Billboard 200, selling 138,000 copies in its first week and was certified Platinum by the RIAA on November 19, 1999.

== Track listing ==
All tracks are written by Ed Kowalczyk, except where noted.

The Distance to Here track listing
No.	Title	Length
1.	"The Dolphin's Cry"	4:24
2.	"The Distance"	3:51
3.	"Sparkle"	4:33
4.	"Run to the Water" (Kowalczyk, Patrick Dahlheimer)	4:28
5.	"Sun"	3:32
6.	"Voodoo Lady" (Kowalczyk, Chad Taylor)	4:19
7.	"Where Fishes Go" (Kowalczyk, Taylor)	4:22
8.	"Face and Ghost (The Children's Song)"	4:30
9.	"Feel the Quiet River Rage"	4:36
10.	"Meltdown"	3:55
11.	"They Stood Up for Love" (Kowalczyk, Dahlheimer, Taylor)	4:35
12.	"We Walk in the Dream"	4:22
13.	"Dance with You"	4:37
Total length:		56:04

== Personnel ==
Live

- Ed Kowalczyk – lead vocals, rhythm guitar
- Chad Taylor – lead guitar, backing vocals
- Patrick Dahlheimer – bass
- Chad Gracey – drums

Additional musicians

- Jerry Harrison – keyboards
- Adam Kowalczyk – rhythm guitar
- Michael "Railo" Railton – keyboards
- Christopher Thorn – rhythm guitar, slide guitar on "Face and Ghost" and "Dance with You"

== Charts ==
=== Weekly charts ===
Chart (1999–2000)	Peak position
Australian Albums (ARIA)	1
Austrian Albums (Ö3 Austria)	11
Belgian Albums (Ultratop Flanders)	1
Belgian Albums (Ultratop Wallonia)	47
Canadian Albums (Billboard)	1
Dutch Albums (Album Top 100)	2
Europe (European Top 100 Albums)	8
Finnish Albums (Suomen virallinen lista)	24
German Albums (Offizielle Top 100)	13
New Zealand Albums (RMNZ)	2
Norwegian Albums (VG-lista)	2
Scottish Albums (Official Charts)	48
Swedish Albums (Sverigetopplistan)	6
Swiss Albums (Schweizer Hitparade)	47
UK Albums (Official Charts)	56
US Billboard 200	4

=== Year-end charts ===
Chart (1999)	Position
Australian Albums (ARIA)	36
Belgian Albums (Ultratop Flanders)	20
Dutch Albums (Album Top 100)	22
US Billboard 200	192

Chart (2000)	Position
Australian Albums (ARIA)	34
Belgian Albums (Ultratop Flanders)	1
Canadian Albums (Nielsen SoundScan)	137
Dutch Albums (Album Top 100)	8

=== Singles ===
Song	Peak chart positions							
Song	US	US Mod.	AUS	BEL (FL)	FIN	NED	NZ	UK
"The Dolphin's Cry"	78	3	25	7	—	10	48	62
"Run to the Water"	—	14	34	—^{[A]}	15	49	44	—
"They Stood Up for Love"	—	31	—	1	—	44	—	—
"—" denotes releases that did not chart

- A: "Run to the Water" did not chart on the Flemish Ultratop 50, but peaked at number 17 on the Ultratip chart.

== Certifications ==
Region	Certification	Certified units/sales
Australia (ARIA)	2× Platinum	140,000^{^}
Belgium (BRMA)	Gold	25,000^{*}
Canada (Music Canada)	Platinum	100,000^{^}
Netherlands (NVPI)	Platinum	100,000^{^}
New Zealand (RMNZ)	Platinum	15,000^{^}
United States (RIAA)	Platinum	1,000,000^{^}
^{*} Sales figures based on certification alone.^{^} Shipments figures based on certification alone.
