= Run to the Water =

2000 single by Live

Single by Live

from the album The Distance to Here
- Released: January 11, 2000
- Studio: The Site (San Rafael, California); Village Recorder (West Los Angeles); A&M (Hollywood, California); The Plant (Sausalito, California)
- Length: 4:27
- Label: Radioactive
- Composers: Ed Kowalczyk; Patrick Dahlheimer
- Lyricist: Ed Kowalczyk
- Producers: Jerry Harrison; Live

Live singles chronology
"The Dolphin's Cry" (1999)	"Run to the Water" (2000)	"They Stood Up for Love" (2000)

Music video
- "Run to the Water" on YouTube

"Run to the Water" is a song by alternative rock group Live, released on January 11, 2000, as the second single from their fifth studio album, The Distance to Here (1999). It became a moderate hit in early 2000, reaching the top 40 in Australia, Finland, and the Netherlands as well as on the American and Canadian rock charts. In Iceland, the song topped the chart for three weeks, becoming Live's second consecutive number-one single.

== Chart performance ==
The song was not released as a single in the United States but reached at number 14 on the Billboard Modern Rock Tracks chart and number 17 on the Billboard Mainstream Rock Tracks chart. In Canada, "Run to the Water" reached number 10 on the RPM Top 30 Rock Report. The single also charted at number 15 in Finland, number 25 in the Netherlands, number 34 in Australia, and number 44 in New Zealand. It peaked at number one in Iceland for three weeks, from April 28 to May 12, 2000, and became the band's second consecutive number-one single.

== Music video ==
The official music video for the song was directed by Martin Weisz. In the video, Ed Kowalczyk sings the song in a dilapidated bathroom, while the people in the street below, including the other band members, are harassed by the police. Kowalczk descends to the street where he and the other band members stand facing the riot police. Conflict seems inevitable until it begins to rain and the tension is released. Soon after, a bomb, thrown by the police, explodes and the water turns to fire, into which the band members jump. Kowalczyk wakes with a start to discover that he has been dreaming and smiles ecstatically as he washes his face in the sink. There is also a second version of that video where, at the end, Kowalczyk comes out a pond on another plane of dimension, giving the story her full meaning.

== Track listings ==
European CD single

1. "Run to the Water" – 4:27
2. "The Dolphin's Cry" (acoustic) – 5:09

European maxi-CD single

1. "Run to the Water" (album version) – 4:27
2. "The Dolphin's Cry" (acoustic version) – 5:09
3. "I Alone" (recorded live for Y100) – 5:06
4. "The Dolphin's Cry" (radio mix) – 4:01

Australian CD single

1. "Run to the Water" (album version)
2. "The Dolphin's Cry" (acoustic version)
3. "I Alone" (recorded live for Y100)
4. "The Dolphin's Cry" (radio mix)
5. "Turn My Head" (recorded live in Melbourne, Australia, May 1997)
- This single was included as a bonus disc on the Australian release of The Distance to Here.

== Credits and personnel ==
Credits are lifted from the US promo CD liner notes and The Distance to Here album booklet.

Studios

- Recorded at The Site (San Rafael, California), Village Recorder (West Los Angeles), A&M Studios (Hollywood, California), and The Plant (Sausalito, California)
- Mixed at South Beach Studios (Miami Beach, Florida) and Encore Studios (Burbank, California)
- Mastered at Sterling Sound (New York City)

Live

- Ed Kowalczyk – lyrics, vocals, guitar
- Patrick Dahlheimer – lyrics, music, bass
- Chad Taylor – lead guitars
- Chad Gracey – drums
- Live – production

Other personnel

- Jerry Harrison – production
- Gary Kurfirst – executive production
- Tom Lord-Alge – mixing
- Karl Derfler – engineering
- Doug McKean – additional engineering
- Ted Jensen – mastering

== Charts ==
=== Weekly charts ===
Chart (2000)	Peak position
Australia (ARIA)	34
Belgium (Ultratip Bubbling Under Flanders)	7
Canada Rock/Alternative (RPM)	10
Finland (Suomen virallinen lista)	15
Iceland (Íslenski Listinn Topp 40)	1
Netherlands (Dutch Top 40)	25
Netherlands (Single Top 100)	49
New Zealand (Recorded Music NZ)	44
US Alternative Airplay (Billboard)	14
US Mainstream Rock (Billboard)	17

=== Year-end charts ===
Chart (2000)	Position
Iceland (Íslenski Listinn Topp 40)	10
US Mainstream Rock Tracks (Billboard)	68
US Modern Rock Tracks (Billboard)	76

== Release history ==
Region	Date	Format(s)	Label(s)	Ref.
United States	January 11, 2000	Mainstream rock; active rock radio	Radioactive	
United States	January 25, 2000	Contemporary hit radio	Radioactive	
United States	April 3, 2000	Hot adult contemporary radio	Radioactive	
