= Forever May Not Be Long Enough =

Single by Live

from the album The Mummy Returns and V
- Released: 2001
- Length: 4:16
- Label: Radioactive Records
- Songwriters: Ed Kowalczyk, Glen Ballard
- Producer: Glen Ballard

Live singles chronology
"Overcome" (2001)	"Forever May Not Be Long Enough" (2001)	"Heaven" (2003)

"Forever May Not Be Long Enough" is a song by alternative rock group Live, released in 2001. Originally written by frontman Ed Kowalczyk and producer Glen Ballard for the film The Mummy Returns, the song was eventually included in the band's album V. Radioactive Records had no intent of making a single out of "Forever May Not Be Long Enough", at most recording a music video featuring the band performing the song in an ancient Egyptian setting, interspersed with footage from The Mummy Returns. It still wound up receiving a CD single in Europe, charting in Belgium (#18) and The Netherlands (#59). The song was also included in the trailer for the PlayStation 2 game of the same name.

== Music video ==
The music video for the single shows the band performing on a platform in front of an Egyptian stone temple with female dancers wearing Egyptian model attire. Other locations include the band members on a flat landscape around Egypt. The video also features clips from the movie itself.

== Track listing ==
=== European CD single ===
1. "Forever May Not Be Long Enough" (Ed Kowalczyk, Glen Ballard) – 3:49
2. "Overcome" (Live from Philadelphia) (Kowalczyk) – 4:23
