= Audrey Geisel University House =

Historic house in California, United States

- William Black House--SDM-W-12 Locus A (CA-SDI-4669)
- U.S. National Register of Historic Places
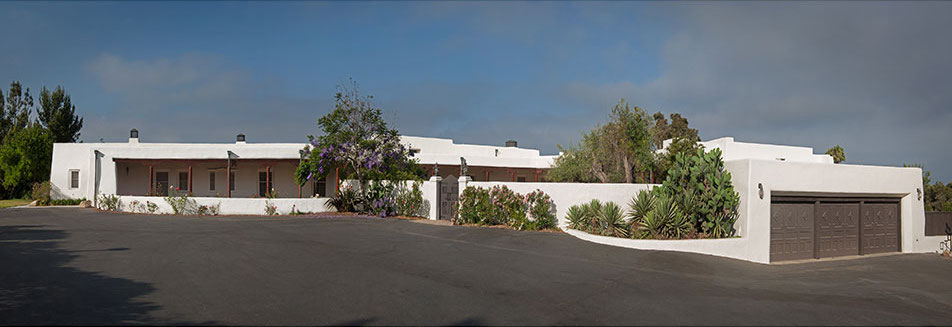

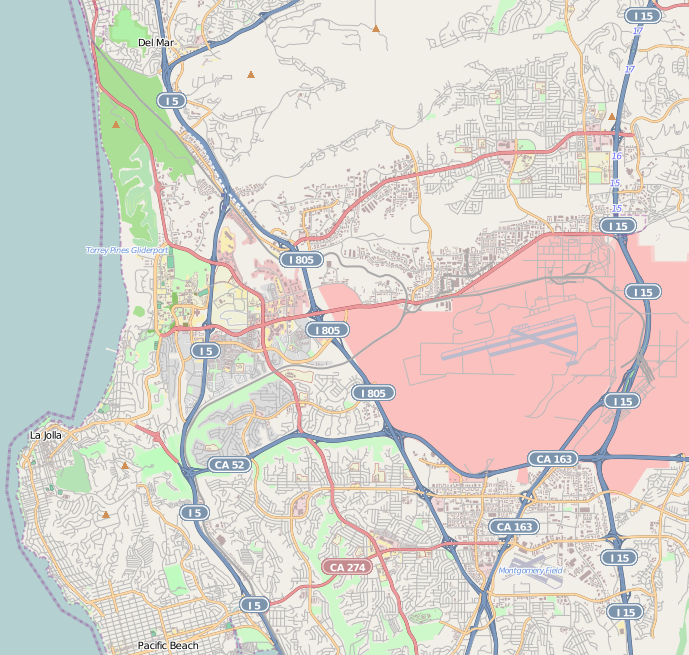
- Location within Northwestern San Diego Location within San Diego County, California Location within California Location within the United States
- Location: 9630 La Jolla Farms Road, La Jolla, California
- Coordinates: 32.87944°N 117.2486°W
- Area: 6.9 acres (2.8 ha)
- Built: 1950-52
- Built by: Stein, Howard
- Architect: Lumpkin, William
- Architectural style: Pueblo
- NRHP reference No.: 08000343
- Added to NRHP: May 2, 2008

The Audrey Geisel University House, historically known as the William Black House, is the private residence of the chancellor of the University of California, San Diego. Located in La Jolla, San Diego, California, it is a historic site that is listed on the National Register of Historic Places. It is located at 9630 La Jolla Farms Road and overlooks Black's Beach, the Scripps Coastal Reserve, and the Pacific Ocean.

The house was designed by architect William Lumpkins of the adobe revival movement of Santa Fe, New Mexico. It was the first house built in the La Jolla Farms area, and was designed for William H. and Ruth Black who lived there during 1952–67 in what is termed Pueblo Revival architecture style. It was then sold to the Regents of the University of California and used by UC San Diego chancellors during 1967–2004. In 2004, the house was deemed structurally unsound and subsequently vacated.

Between 2004 and 2012, the house was the subject of numerous controversies stemming from the university's attempts to demolish, sell, and renovate the property. La Jolla residents objected to the sale of what they saw as an important historical artifact. The site is also significant as a location of a prehistoric Native American village; it is "sacred ground to Kumeyaay people." Between 1929 and 2008, the remains of 29 Kumeyaay were found and removed from the site, at least 17 of which were subsequently housed in the San Diego Museum of Man. In 2010, a historically sensitive remodel design by architect Ione R. Stiegler was approved. The renovation included a seismic retrofit and structural, electrical, and plumbing repairs, while avoiding compromising any of the sacred land or ocean views near the original house. The $10 million remodel was completed in 2013 and funded by external gifts, including a $3 million donation by La Jolla resident Audrey Geisel, the widow of Theodor Seuss Geisel. In recognition of her gift, the completed house was renamed the Audrey Geisel University House. Since 2014, the house has served as the official residence of Pradeep K. Khosla, the eighth chancellor of UC San Diego. It is also used for hosting special events and formal university functions.

The property was listed on the National Register of Historic Places in 2008 as William Black House—SDM-W-12 Locus A (CA-SDI-4669). The site includes a house built during 1950-52 and a cemetery and the site of a pre-historic village. The listing included one contributing building and one contributing site on 6.9 acres (2.8 ha).
