= Agnes Lawrence Pelton =

German American painter

Agnes Pelton
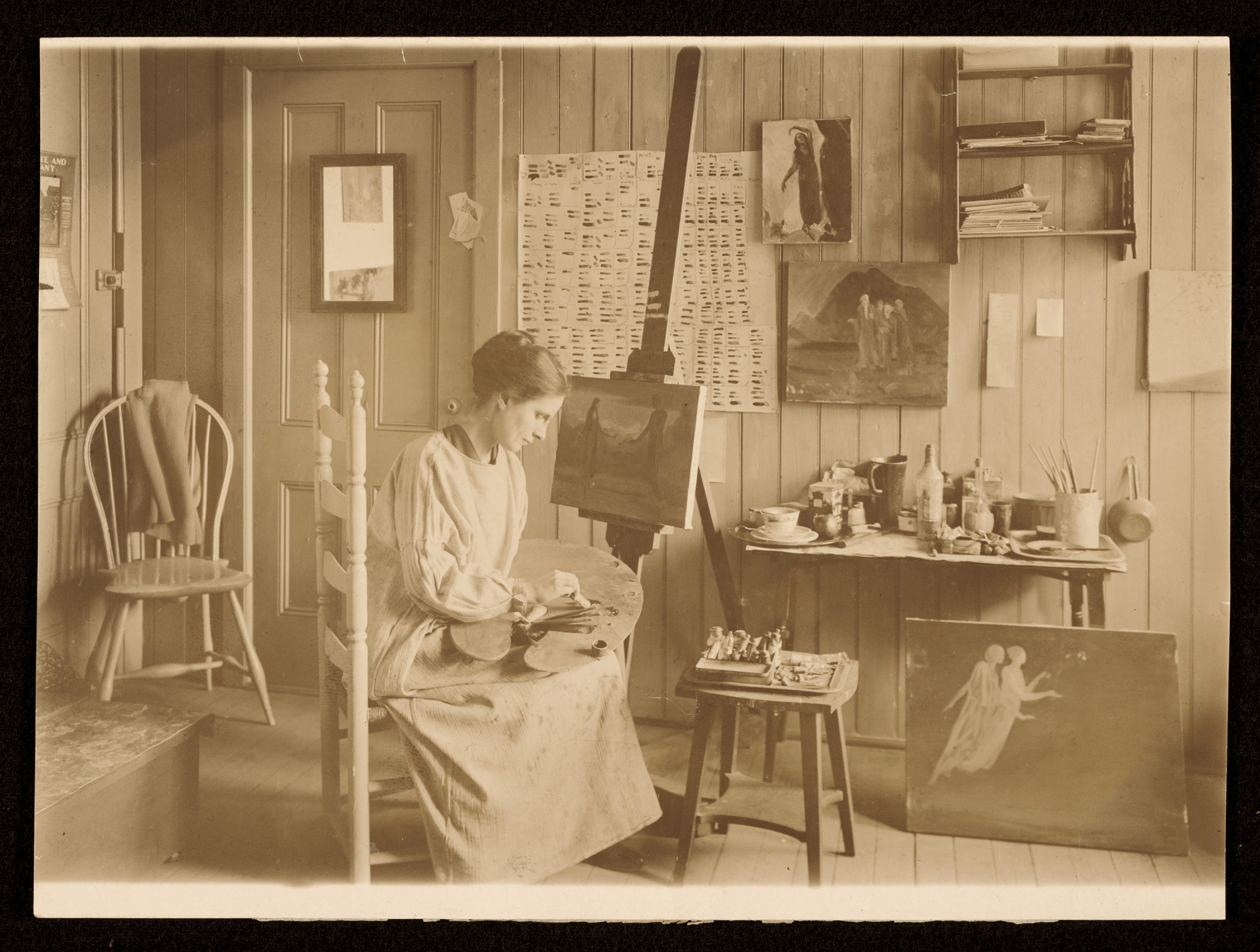
- Agnes Pelton in the studio, estimate 1910s
- Born: Agnes Lawrence Pelton; August 22, 1881; Stuttgart, German Empire
- Died: March 13, 1961 (aged 79); Cathedral City, California, U.S.
- Resting place: San Jacinto Mountains
- Education: Pratt Institute
- Known for: Painting
- Style: Abstract
- Movement: Transcendental Painting Group
- Website: http://www.agnespeltonsociety.com

Agnes Lawrence Pelton (August 22, 1881 – March 13, 1961) was a modernist painter who was born in Germany and moved to the United States as a child. She studied art in the United States and Europe. She made portraits of Pueblo Native Americans, desert landscapes and still lifes. Pelton's work evolved through at least three distinct themes: her early "Imaginative Paintings," art of the American Southwest people and landscape, and abstract art that reflected her spiritual beliefs. She was a first cousin of American sculptor Laura Gardin Fraser.

== Early life ==
Agnes Lawrence Pelton was born in Stuttgart, Germany to American parents, William and Florence Pelton. She lived in Rotterdam, the Netherlands from 1882 to 1884 and in Basel, Switzerland from 1884 to 1888. In 1888, when Agnes was about 7 years old, she and her mother moved to Elizabeth Tilton's home in Brooklyn, New York, located at 1403 Pacific Street. Agnes' father died of a morphine overdose May 23, 1891, at his brother's home in Louisiana. Florence Pelton studied music at the Stuttgart Conservatory of Music and operated the Pelton School of Music, from the family home in Brooklyn, for 30 years. She also gave lessons in French and German. Due to her poor health, Agnes was educated at home and her mother and Arthur Whiting taught her piano.

== Education ==
Pelton studied at the Pratt Institute from 1895 to 1900, graduating with fellow Modernist artist Max Weber. She continued her studies with one of her instructors, Arthur Wesley Dow, in Ipswich, Massachusetts. She studied landscape and was Dow's assistant at his summer school, where he taught Modernism, inspired by Chinese and Japanese art. Biographer Tiska Blankenship said that "Dow emphasized structure, spirit, imagination, creation, and the nonnaturalistic use of color, a technique he taught using Japanese prints to demonstrate space relations and the appropriate use of light and dark masses... Dow's influence was critical to Pelton's development of abstractions based on interior, spiritual values." Dow also taught Georgia O'Keeffe. Pelton took summer classes from William Langson Lathrop in 1907. Pelton studied in Italy in 1910 and 1911, taking life drawing lessons and studying Italian painters at the British Academy in Rome, and also studied with Hamilton Easter Field, who was another of her Pratt instructors.

== Career ==
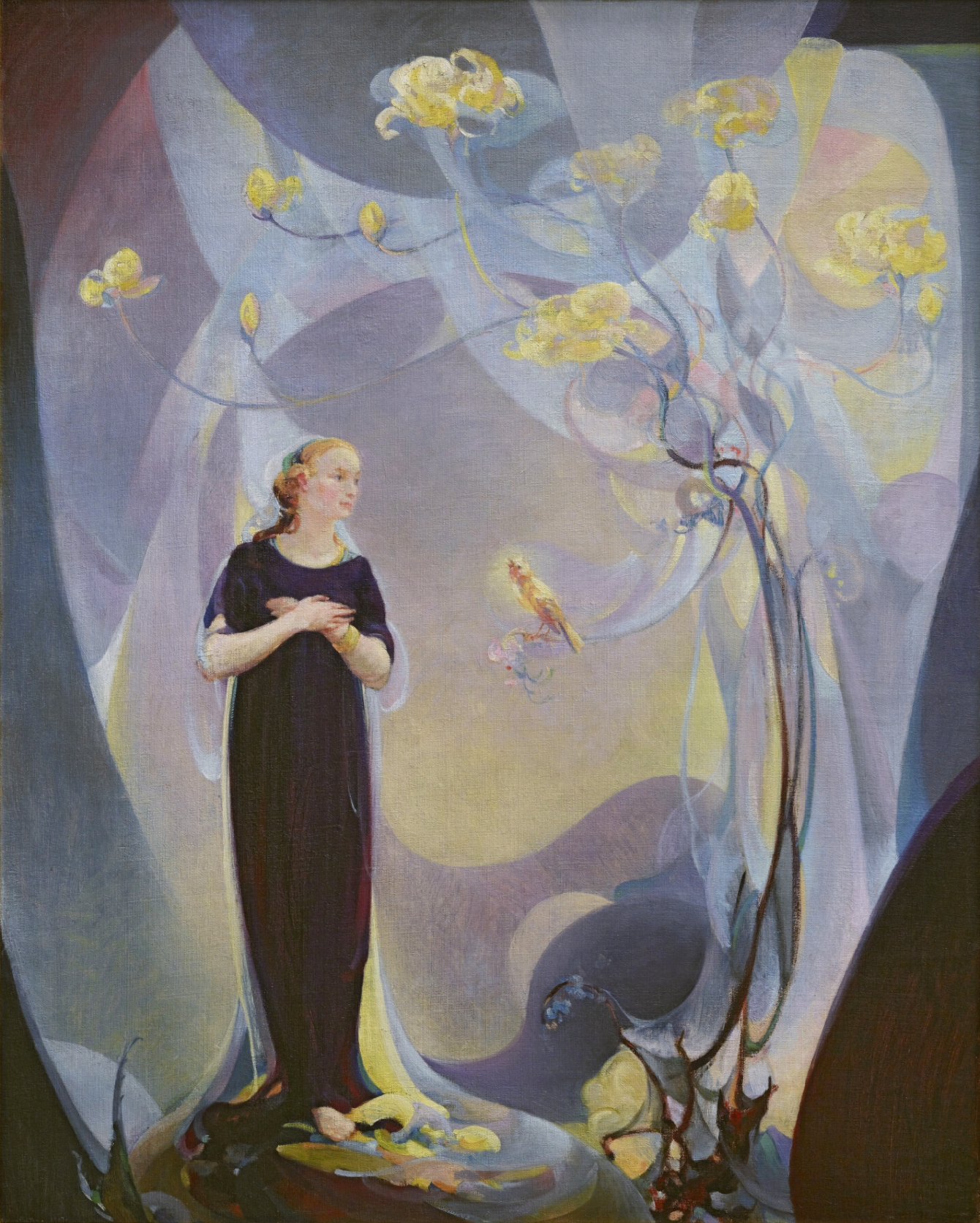
Room Decoration in Purple and Gray, 1917

Her work was exhibited in Ogunquit, Maine at Field's studio in 1912. Based upon her work at that show, Walt Kuhn invited her to participate in the 1913 Armory Show, where two of her paintings, Stone Age and Vine Wood were exhibited. What Pelton called "Imaginative Paintings" were influenced by the work of Arthur B. Davies and depicted the effect of natural light. She made these paintings from 1911 to 1917.

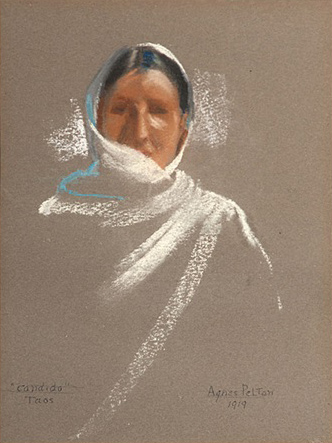
Candido, Taos, 1919

Pelton's work changed significantly following a visit to Mabel Dodge Luhan in Taos, New Mexico in 1919. She painted in oil and used pastels to create realistic portraits and desert landscapes and her works were exhibited in Santa Fe at the School of American Research. Pelton visited Pueblo Native Americans in the American southwest.

Pelton had her studios in Greenwich Village in New York City until 1921 when her mother died. She moved to Long Island and lived in a Hayground windmill that had been converted to a house. She also traveled to Hawaii, Beirut, Syria, Georgia and California.

She painted portraits and still lifes in Hawaii in 1923 and 1924. She created abstract works of art beginning 1926, which were exhibited in New York at the Argent Galleries and the Museum of New Mexico. By 1926, she had exhibited in 20 group exhibitions and 14 solo exhibitions.

She settled in Cathedral City, California in late 1931. Pelton originally intended to just visit the area, but lived there for nearly 30 years. She wrote:

The vibration of this light, the spaciousness of these skies enthralled me. I knew there was a spirit in nature as in everything else, but here in the desert it was an especially bright spirit.

Pelton recorded her spiritual and philosophical thoughts, had an "intense interest" in Agni Yoga, which influenced her work. Seven of her paintings, like Fires of Spring and White Fire, represented the fire symbol of Agni Yoga. She had a close friendship with modern transpersonal astrology pioneer Dane Rudhyar and Modernist Southwest painter Raymond Jonson. In 1938, she was a co-founder, first president, and the oldest member of the Transcendental Painting Group. Pelton died in Cathedral City in 1961 and was cremated. Her ashes were buried in the San Jacinto Mountains.

== Posthumous exhibitions and legacy ==
"Agnes Pelton, Poet of Nature", a 1995-1996 retrospective exhibition of her work, brought national attention to her work. Curator Michael Zakian wrote:

Pelton's works were poetic celebrations of nature that explored the vital forces animating the physical world. Interested in themes of creation, growth, and radiance, Pelton translated favorite subjects—a glowing star, an opening flower—into life-affirming images of rare beauty and resonance. In many ways, her paintings resemble the art of her contemporary Georgia O'Keeffe, only more colorful, more spiritual, and more imaginative.

In 2009, her work was exhibited with those of three other Modernist artists: Georgia O'Keeffe, Florence Miller Pierce, and Agnes Martin. A 192-page catalog accompanied the exhibition. From March to September 2019, the Phoenix Art Museum held an exhibition featuring over 40 of Pelton's works. From March 13 to June 28, 2020, Whitney Museum of American Art held an exhibit organized by the Phoenix Art Museum, "Agnes Pelton: The Desert Transcendentalist".

The Agnes Pelton Society was founded in 2013 to promote Pelton's life and legacy.

== Collections ==
- Honolulu Museum of Art, Hawaii
- The Raymond Jonson Collection, University of New Mexico Art Museum, Albuquerque
- New Mexico Museum of Art
- Oakland Museum of California
- Palm Springs Art Museum, California
- Palladino/Den Historic Home of Agnes Pelton, Cathedral City Cove, California
- Parrish Art Museum, Southampton, New York
- Phoenix Art Museum, Arizona: Messengers, 1932; Day, 1935
- San Diego Museum of Art, California: The Primal Wing, 1933
- Santa Barbara Museum of Art, California
- Sussman Staying Visible Collection, Foothill DeAnza Community College District, Cupertino, California.
- Whitney Museum of American Art, New York: Untitled abstract, 1931
- Crystal Bridges Museum, Arkansas: Divinity Lotus, 1929

== Sources ==
- Blankenship, Tiska. "Agnes Pelton and Florence Miller Pierce: The Two Women Artists in the Transcendental Painting Group". Women Artists of the American West. College of Liberal Arts, Purdue University. Archived from the original on September 18, 2012.
- Severson, Don R. Finding Paradise: Island Art in Private Collections, University of Hawaii Press, 2002, p. 120. ISBN 978-0-937426-55-5.
