= Heaven (Live song) =

Single by Live

from the album Birds of Pray
- Released: April 7, 2003
- Length: 3:52
- Label: Radioactive Records
- Songwriter: Ed Kowalczyk
- Producer: Jim Wirt

Live singles chronology
"Forever May Not Be Long Enough" (2002)	"Heaven" (2003)	"Sweet Release" (2003)

"Heaven" is a song by alternative rock group Live, which was released as the first single from their 2003 album, Birds of Pray.

== Background ==
The song was not released as a commercial CD single in the United States, but was made available as a purchasable digital download. The song reached #59 on the Billboard Hot 100 chart. The song also reached #56 on Billboard's Hot 100 Airplay chart, and peaked at #33 on both the Billboard Modern Rock Tracks and Mainstream Rock Tracks charts. It was also a hit in Australia, Brazil, New Zealand, The Netherlands and Belgium.

The video depicts a young girl and a boy at the opposite sides of a river who want to cross it, so they can be together. They plan to meet in a place where the boy thinks he can swim to the other side, but he is taken by the stream and carried away. The girl swims to him, they realize they are heading to the waterfalls. The video was shot in Iceland.

After the song became a success in the United States, the original video was replaced in most rotations by a new video. Shot at Voorst National in Brussels, Belgium, this version was a high intensity performance of the song, featuring all four principal band members.

== Track listings ==
=== Australian and European CD single ===
1. "Heaven" – 3:52
2. "Life Marches On" – 2:55
3. "Forever May Not Be Long Enough" (Egyptian Dreams Remix) – 4:06
4. "Overcome" (Live) – 4:25

=== Canadian CD single ===
1. "Heaven" – 3:52
2. "Forever May Not Be Long Enough" (Egyptian Dreams Remix) – 4:06

=== European 7" picture disc and CD single 2 ===
1. "Heaven" – 3:52
2. "Forever May Not Be Long Enough" (Egyptian Dreams Remix) – 4:06

=== European "Special Tour Edition" CD single ===

1. "Heaven" – 3:50
2. "Heaven" (Acoustic Version) – 3:28
3. "Operation Spirit (The Tyranny of Tradition)" (Live) – 4:23
4. "Heaven" (Video)

=== U.S. digital download single ===

1. "Heaven" – 3:50
2. "Heaven" (Acoustic Version) – 3:28

== Charts ==
=== Weekly charts ===
Chart (2003)	Peak position
Australia (ARIA)	19
Belgium (Ultratip Bubbling Under Flanders)	6
Netherlands (Dutch Top 40)	21
Netherlands (Single Top 100)	30
New Zealand (Recorded Music NZ)	16
US Billboard Hot 100	59
US Adult Pop Airplay (Billboard)	4
US Pop Airplay (Billboard)	36
US Mainstream Rock (Billboard)	33

=== Year-end charts ===
Chart (2003)	Position
New Zealand (Recorded Music NZ)	45
US Adult Top 40 (Billboard)	16
