= E Boyd =

American painter (1903–1974)

- Born: Elizabeth Boyd White; September 23, 1903; Philadelphia, Pennsylvania, U.S.
- Died: September 30, 1974 (aged 71); Santa Fe, New Mexico, U.S.
- Education: Pennsylvania Academy for Fine Art; Academie de la Grande Chaumiere
- Known for: Painting, writing
- Movement: Rio Grande Painters

E Boyd (September 23, 1903—September 30, 1974) was a painter, museum employee and scholar on the Spanish colonial art of New Mexico.

== Biography ==
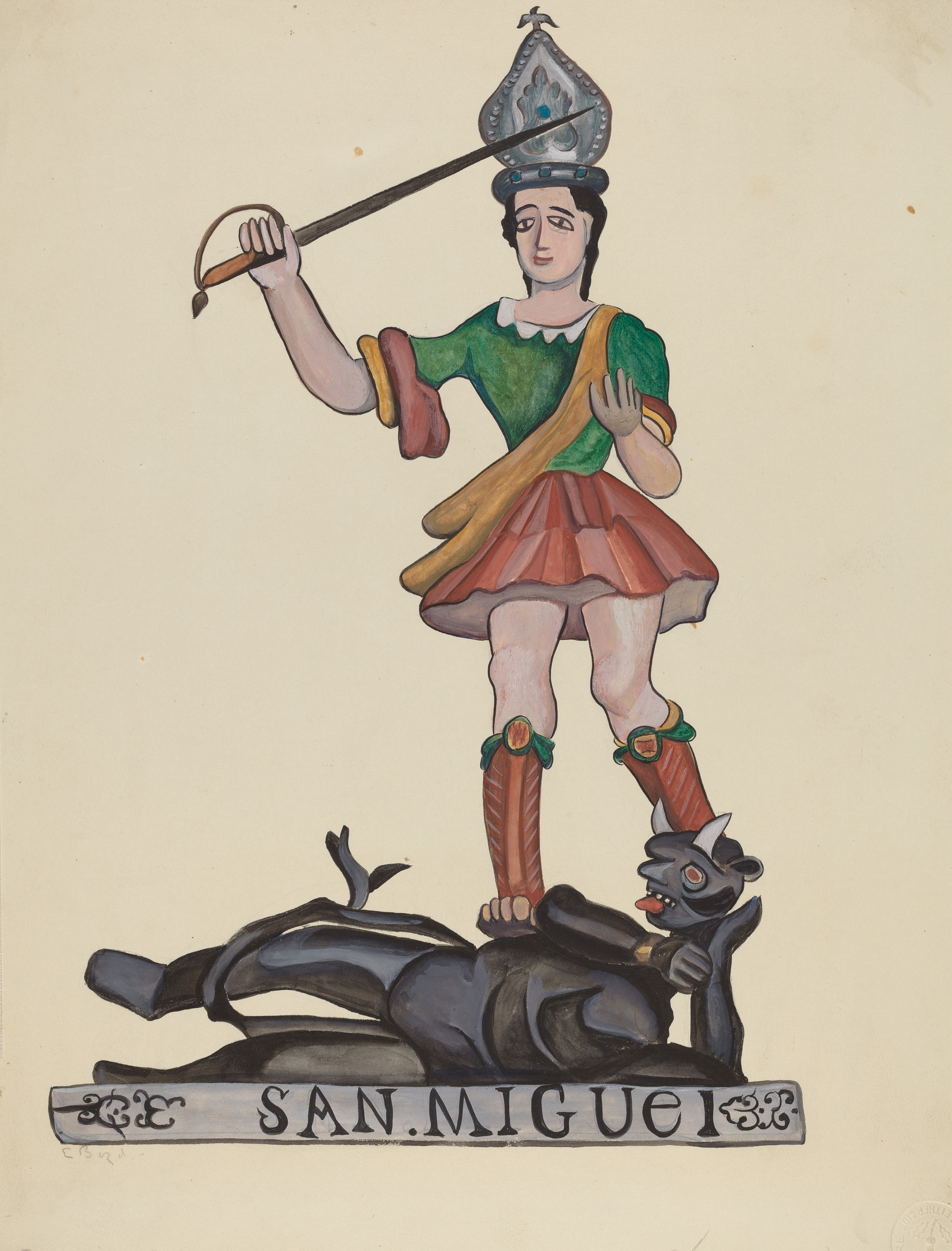
Depiction of a bulto of Saint Michael and the Devil, produced for the Index of American Design, c. 1936.

Born in Philadelphia, Pennsylvania, as Elizabeth Boyd White, she preferred to be called by the gender-neutral "E Boyd". Boyd studied embroidery, interior design and painting at the Pennsylvania Academy of the Fine Arts before attending the Academie de la Grande Chaumiere in Paris. She moved to Santa Fe, New Mexico, in the fall of 1929 and began exhibiting her paintings locally soon after. In 1933 she co-founded and began exhibiting with the Rio Grande Painters, a group that included Charles Barrows, Eleanor Cowles, Anne Stockton, James Stovall Morris, Gina Schnaufer, Paul Lantz, and Cady Wells. As secretary of the group she was responsible for organizing exhibitions.

After the Rio Grande Painters disbanded in 1936, Boyd received funding from the Fine Arts Program of the U.S. General Services Administration to complete watercolors and conduct research documenting designs from 18th and 19th century artifacts in New Mexico. These watercolors were used by Manville Chapman to create woodblocks that were then hand-colored by numerous individuals and reproduced in 1938 in the Portfolio of Spanish Colonial Design in New Mexico. The Portfolio was a forerunner of and contributor to the national Index of American Design.

Boyd's first book, Saint and Saint Makers, was published in 1946. It was considered the first truly scholarly and well-researched book on the subject of santos. From 1945 to 1951 Boyd primarily lived in Los Angeles. She worked at the Los Angeles County Museum of Art from 1949 to 1951 first as a Librarian and then as Registrar. When her friend, Cady Wells, donated his collection of santos to the Museum of New Mexico in 1951, he recommended her as the collection's curator. Boyd and the collection were initially housed in the New Mexico Museum of Art before they were moved to the Museum of International Folk Art. The culmination of her life's research on the subject was the publication in 1968 of the book Popular Arts of Colonial New Mexico. In honor of her work for the state, Boyd was awarded the New Mexico's Governor's Award for Excellence in the Arts in 1974.
