= Freaks (Live song) =

Single by Live

from the album Secret Samadhi
- B-side: "Love My Way"
- Released: May 5, 1997
- Length: 4:53
- Label: Radioactive
- Songwriter: Live
- Producers: Jay Healy; Live

Live singles chronology
| "Lakini's Juice" (1997) | "Freaks" (1997) | "Turn My Head" (1997) |

Alternative covers
- UK CD2

"Freaks" is a song by alternative rock group Live, which was released as the second single from their 1997 album, Secret Samadhi.

The song was not released as a single in the US, but still reached number 5 on the Billboard Mainstream Rock Tracks chart and number 13 on the Modern Rock Tracks chart. The single was included as a bonus disc on some copies of the album Secret Samadhi in Australia.

== Music video ==
The cover art for the single is from the song's music video, which was directed by Paul Cunningham. The video stars British actor Peter Guinness and features Live, dressed in red shirts and tuxedos, performing the song in a club, where the only drink served appears to be milk. Guinness plays a newcomer to the bar who sits drinking black coffee and refuses the attempts of another patron to get him to try the milk. After a scuffle the newcomer tries to leave but is subdued by the other patrons who force him to drink the milk from a champagne bottle.

== Chart positions ==
The song reached number 60 on the UK Singles Chart, number 80 in the Netherlands and number 36 in Australia.

== Track listings ==
All songs written by Live:

=== Australian CD single ===
1. "Freaks" (Radio Edit) – 4:53
2. "Lakini's Juice" (Live) – 5:04
3. "Freaks" (Live) – 4:56
4. "Love My Way" (Live) – 4:22
5. "Lakini's Juice" (Full On Mix) – 5:11

=== European 7" single ===
1. "Freaks" (Radio Edit) – 4:53
2. "Love My Way" (Live) – 4:20

=== European CD single ===
1. "Freaks" (Radio Edit) – 4:53
2. "Lakini's Juice" (Live) – 5:03
3. "Freaks" (Live) – 4:58
4. "Love My Way" (Live) – 4:20

=== Netherlands CD single ===
1. "Freaks" (Radio Edit) – 4:53
2. "Love My Way" (Live) – 4:20

=== UK CD single 1 ===
1. "Freaks" (Album Version) – 4:53
2. "Lakini's Juice" (Live) – 5:03
3. "Freaks" (Live)" – 4:58

=== UK CD single 2 ===
1. "Freaks" (Album Version) – 4:53
2. "Freaks" (Labor, Labor, Labor Remix) – 6:48
3. "Love My Way" (Live) – 4:18
