= The Dolphin's Cry =

1999 single by Live

Single by Live

from the album The Distance to Here
- Released: August 24, 1999
- Studio: The Site (San Rafael, California); Village Recorder (West Los Angeles); A&M (Hollywood, California); The Plant (Sausalito, California)
- Length: 4:25 (album version); 4:02 (radio edit)
- Label: Radioactive
- Songwriter: Ed Kowalczyk
- Producers: Jerry Harrison; Live

Live singles chronology
"Rattlesnake" (1997)	"The Dolphin's Cry" (1999)	"Run to the Water" (2000)

Music video
- "The Dolphin's Cry" on YouTube

"The Dolphin's Cry" is a song by American alternative rock band Live, released on August 24, 1999, as the lead single from their fifth studio album, The Distance to Here. Written by lead singer Ed Kowalczyk, the song was co-produced by the band and Jerry Harrison of Talking Heads. "The Dolphin's Cry" reached number one on the Canadian RPM Top 30 Rock Report and number two on the US Billboard Mainstream Rock Tracks chart. Internationally, "The Dolphin's Cry" peaked at number one in Iceland, number seven in Flanders, and number 10 in the Netherlands.

== Chart performance ==
In the United States "The Dolphin's Cry" reached number 78 on the Billboard Hot 100, number two on the Billboard Mainstream Rock chart and number three on the Billboard Modern Rock Tracks chart. In Canada, the song topped the RPM Top 30 Rock Report. The single also reached number one in Iceland, number seven the Flanders region of Belgium, number 10 in the Netherlands, number 25 in Australia, number 48 in New Zealand, and number 62 in the United Kingdom. In the latter country, it topped the UK Rock Chart. In Australia, the single earned a Gold certification for shipments in excess of 35,000.

== Music video ==
The music video, directed by Martin Weisz, features the band playing in an alley as successively larger waves of water flow towards them. The other people in the alley grow more panicked as the waves get larger. Towards the end of the song, the largest wave sweeps through the alley and knocks the band down, but they get back up and resume playing.

== Track listings ==
UK CD1

1. "The Dolphin's Cry"
2. "Vine Street"
3. "Lakini's Juice" (Sippin on Lakini's Juice remix)

UK CD2

1. "The Dolphin's Cry" (album version)
2. "Sun" (loop version)
3. "Turn My Head" (recorded live in Melbourne, Australia 1997)
4. "The Dolphin's Cry" (video)

European CD single

1. "The Dolphin's Cry" (radio edit)
2. "Vine Street"

Australian and South African CD single

1. "The Dolphin's Cry" (radio edit)
2. "Vine Street"
3. "Sun" (loop version)

== Credits and personnel ==
Credits are lifted from the US promo CD liner notes and The Distance to Here album booklet.

Studios

- Recorded at The Site (San Rafael, California), Village Recorder (West Los Angeles), A&M Studios (Hollywood, California), and The Plant (Sausalito, California)
- Mixed at South Beach Studios (Miami Beach, Florida) and Encore Studios (Burbank, California)
- Mastered at Sterling Sound (New York City)

Live

- Ed Kowalczyk – lyrics, music, lead vocals, guitar
- Chad Taylor – lead guitar
- Patrick Dahlheimer – bass
- Chad Gracey – drums
- Live – production

Other personnel

- Jerry Harrison – production
- Gary Kurfirst – executive production
- Tom Lord-Alge – mixing
- Karl Derfler – engineering
- Doug McKean – additional engineering
- Ted Jensen – mastering
- Sagmeister Inc. – art direction
- Motoko Hada – artwork design and illustration

== Charts ==
=== Weekly charts ===
Chart (1999–2000)	Peak position
Australia (ARIA)	25
Belgium (Ultratop 50 Flanders)	7
Canada Rock/Alternative (RPM)	1
Iceland (Íslenski Listinn Topp 40)	1
Netherlands (Dutch Top 40)	13
Netherlands (Single Top 100)	10
New Zealand (Recorded Music NZ)	48
Scottish Singles Sales (Official Charts)	65
UK Singles (Official Charts)	62
UK Rock & Metal (Official Charts)	1
US Billboard Hot 100	78
US Adult Alternative Airplay (Billboard)	18
US Alternative Airplay (Billboard)	3
US Mainstream Rock (Billboard)	2

=== Year-end charts ===
Chart (1999)	Position
Belgium (Ultratop 50 Flanders)	85
Iceland (Íslenski Listinn Topp 40)	4
Netherlands (Dutch Top 40)	58
Netherlands (Single Top 100)	94
US Mainstream Rock Tracks (Billboard)	25
US Modern Rock Tracks (Billboard)	31

Chart (2000)	Position
US Mainstream Rock Tracks (Billboard)	38
US Modern Rock Tracks (Billboard)	51

== Certifications ==
Region	Certification	Certified units/sales
Australia (ARIA)	Gold	35,000^{^}
^{^} Shipments figures based on certification alone.

== Release history ==
Region	Date	Format(s)	Label(s)	Ref.
United States	August 24, 1999	Mainstream rock; active rock; alternative radio	Radioactive	
United Kingdom	January 24, 2000	CD	Radioactive	

== In popular culture ==
This song was featured in The Sopranos episode University when Caitlin Rucker interrupts Meadow Soprano and Noah Tannenbaum kissing and was also used in the film Urban Legends: Final Cut.
