= Emil Bisttram =

American painter

Emil J. Bisttram
- Born: April 7, 1895; Nagylak, Kingdom of Hungary (today Nădlac, Romania)
- Died: February 26, 1976 (aged 80); Taos, New Mexico
- Education: New York School of Fine and Applied Art; National Academy of Design; Cooper Union; The Art Student's League
- Known for: Painting
- Style: Dynamic symmetry
- Movement: Transcendental Painting Group; Taos Art Association

Emil Bisttram (1895–1976) was an American artist who lived in New York and Taos, New Mexico, who is known for his modernist work.

== Life and works ==
Oil painting "Contemporary Justice and Woman," first floor lobby, Department of Justice, Washington, D.C LCCN2010720193

Emil Bisttram was born in Nagylak, Hungary in 1895 (today Nădlac, Romania). When he was 11 years old, he immigrated with his family to New York City, where they settled on the Lower East Side of Manhattan. He was a talented artist, and after a few years began his schooling at the National Academy of Art and Design, then Cooper Union, Parsons, and The Art Student's League. He began teaching soon after completing school, first at the New York School of Fine and Applied Arts, and then at the Master Institute of the Roerich Museum.

Bisttram first visited Taos in the summer of 1930. He later fell in love with the scenery and moved there. In 1931 he won a Guggenheim Fellowship to study mural painting. The fellowship enabled Bisttram to travel to Mexico where he studied mural painting with the world famous muralist Diego Rivera. During the Great Depression he completed numerous federally supported mural commissions, including at the Robert F. Kennedy Building in Washington D.C., The Taos County Courthouse, New Mexico, and the Federal Courthouse in Roswell, New Mexico. After returning to Taos in 1932, Bistrram started the Heptagon Gallery and the Taos School of Art. In 1938, Bisttram founded the Transcendental Painting Group with Raymond Jonson and several other Santa Fe artists.

In 1952, Bisttram co-founded the Taos Art Association, and later in 1959 won the Grand Prize for painting at the New Mexico State Fair.

In 1970, Emil Bisttram served as a judge and monitor for a statewide arts grant competition for art to be placed in the newly constructed County Courthouse building, designed by architect Bill Menningbach of Taos. Ken Drew, a local sculptor, won the competition. Bisttram oversaw the project for the next two years, and in June 1972 Drew completed the installation. Then-Senator Joseph Montoya and other dignitaries from Santa Fe officiated at the dedication ceremonies. In 1975, his birthday, April 7, was declared "Emil Bisttram Day," a New Mexico state holiday.

== Public collections ==
His work can be found in the following public collections:

- New Mexico Museum of Art
- Albuquerque Museum
- Philadelphia Museum of Art
- Phoenix Art Museum
- Smithsonian American Art Museum
- Los Angeles County Museum of Art
- Metropolitan Museum of Art
- Nora Eccles Harrison Museum of Art - Utah State University
- Portland Museum of Art
- Denver Art Museum

== Sources ==
- Pintores Press; 1st edition (1988). The transcendental art of Emil Bisttram by Emil Bisttram . ISBN 978-0-934116-07-7
