= Raymond Jonson =

American painter (1891–1982)

C. Raymond Jonson
- Born: Carl Raymond Johnson; July 18, 1891; Chariton, Iowa, U.S.
- Died: May 10, 1982 (aged 90); Albuquerque, New Mexico
- Movement: Transcendental Painting Group

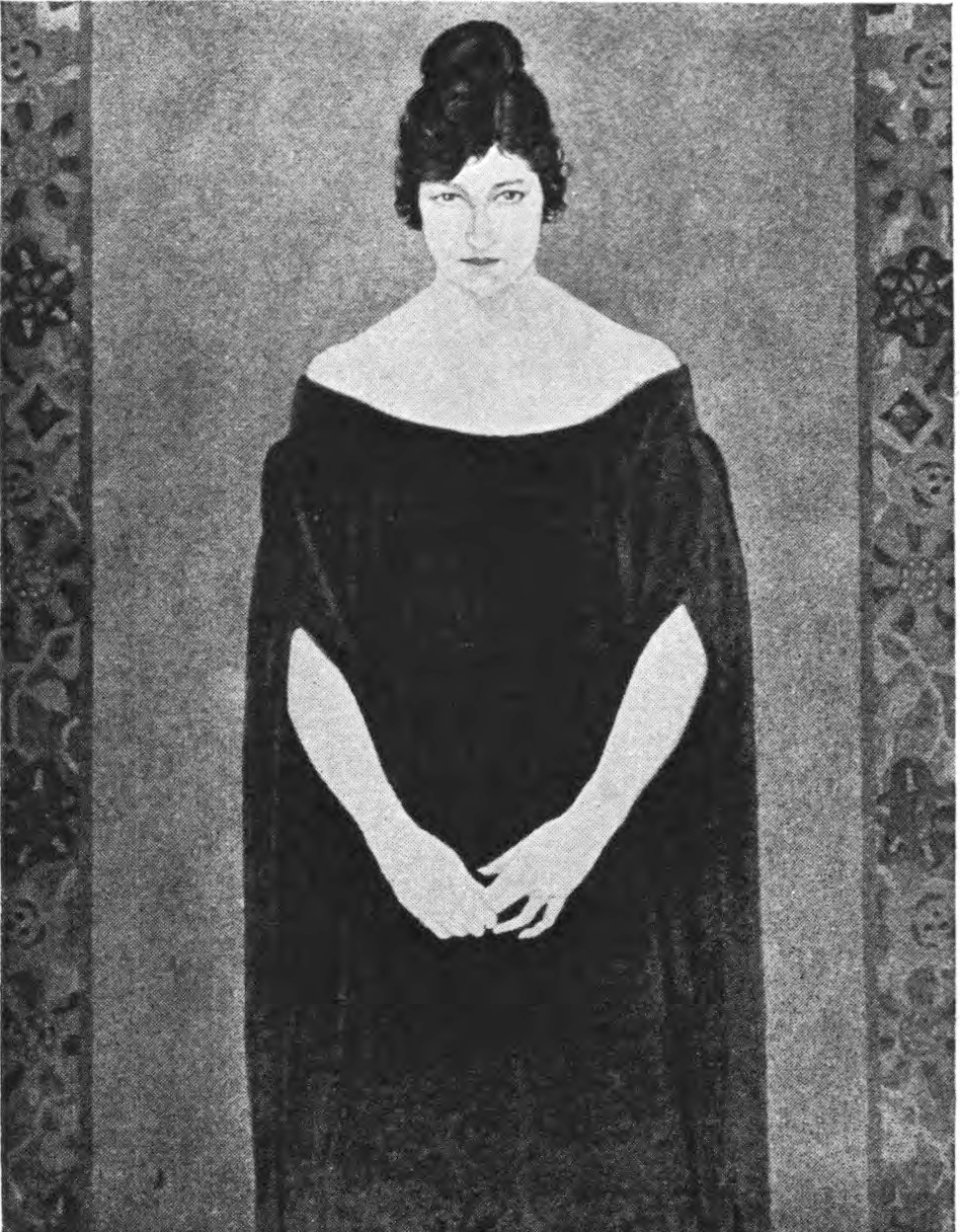
A Lady Blue and Mauve, C. Raymond Johnson (b&w reproduction, 1920)

Raymond Jonson (July 18, 1891 – May 10, 1982), was an American-born Modernist painter known for his paintings of the American Southwest. Born Carl Raymond Johnson, he originally signed his paintings C. Raymond Johnson, but later used Raymond Jonson, dropping the first initial and reverting to a more traditional spelling of his last name.

Jonson organized modernist exhibitions at the Museum of New Mexico. He established the Atalaya Art School, teaching art classes, and founded the Transcendental Painting Group in 1938. Raymond Jonson established the Jonson Gallery at the University of New Mexico in 1950. The gallery later moved to the University of New Mexico Art Museum.

== Biography ==
C. Raymond Johnson was born in Chariton, Iowa in 1891, one of six children of Reverend Gustav Johnson and Josephine Abrahamson Johnson. The family moved to Portland, Oregon in 1902, where he attended Lincoln High School and the Museum Art School. At twenty, Jonson attended the Chicago Academy of Fine Arts. Later, he continued the development of his technical skills at the Chicago Art Institute. In 1913, Jonson was strongly affected by the avant-garde works displayed in the Armory Show, particularly the works of Wassily Kandinsky. His artistic theories were further developed by Kandinsky's book On The Spiritual In Art.

He also taught at the Chicago Academy of Fine Arts until 1920. In Nicholas & Helena Roerich, The Spiritual Journey of Two Great Artists & Peacemakers, Ruth Abrams Drayer writes that Jonson visited the exhibition of Nicholas Roerich in 1921 and then wrote in his diary, "There opened at the Institute the exhibition of the work of Nicholas Roerich. It is glorious. Would that I could express the wonder of it -- I feel that at his best he has accomplished that which all artists hope to do. There are at least six paintings that I believe to be the most spiritual pieces of expression that I have ever seen." Jonson went on to become secretary in Roerich's society Cor Ardens composed of the "fiery, spiritual, radical group of young painters" who shared Roerich's belief that "the only real fraternity among men is the fraternity of beauty as expressed in art."

In 1922 Jonson helped found the Chicago No-Jury Society of Artists.

In 1922, Jonson's life was changed when he visited New Mexico for the first time. The experiences and sights of this short visit to Santa Fe, convinced Jonson to move to New Mexico in 1924 to focus on painting among the southwestern landscapes. In Santa Fe, Jonson started the Atalaya Art School and arranged for a "Modern Wing" in which he mounted monthly exhibitions by modern artists at the New Mexico Museum of Art from 1927-1931. In 1934, Jonson began teaching art at the University of New Mexico in Albuquerque.

In 1938, Jonson co-founded the Transcendental Painting Group with Emil Bisttram. Drayer writes that Bisttram had previously taught painting at Roerich's Master Institute in New York City for several years. The aim of the Transcendental Painting Group was "to defend, validate and promote abstract art. They sought to carry painting beyond the appearance of the physical world, through new expressions of space, color, light and design." Other members of the Transcendental Painting Group were Ed Garman, Florence Miller Pierce, Horace Towner Pierce, Agnes Pelton, Stuart Walker, William Lumpkins, and Lawren Harris. The group was forced to disband in 1942 due to World War II.

The Jonson Gallery was established at the University of New Mexico in 1950. While teaching at the University of New Mexico in the early 1950s, Jonson had a profound influence on the Cochiti Pueblo artist Joe Herrera. Jonson retired from the University of New Mexico in 1954, but continued to mentor students there, including painter William Conger. Raymond Jonson died at the age of 90 while at the Jonson Gallery on May 10, 1982. The Jonson Gallery's collection was moved to the UNM Art Museum in 2010.
