= Michael Zakian =

American art historian and museum curator (1957–2020)

- Born: April 7, 1957; New York City, U.S.
- Died: January 20, 2020 (aged 62)

Academic background
- Education: Columbia University School of the Arts

Academic work
- Institutions: Pepperdine University

Michael Zakian (April 7, 1957 – January 14, 2020) was an American art historian and museum curator. He was the director of the Frederick R. Weisman Museum in Malibu, California for 25 years until his death in 2020. His academic research focused on abstract expressionism.

== Early life and education ==
Michael Zakian was born in New York City in 1957. As a child, he visited museums, including the Guggenheim Museum, Metropolitan Museum of Art, and the Museum of Modern Art. These visits instilled Zakian's interest in the visual arts. He attended Columbia University and earned his bachelor's degree in art history. Next, he earned his master's degree and doctorate, while serving as a teaching assistant, in art history from Rutgers University. His focus was abstract expressionism.

== Career ==
...my primary goal is education. I'm not just showing beautiful things to be admired for their own inherent beauty. I always emphasize that this art was made to convey certain ideas or make a particular point . . . we use our eyes all the time, but often we really don't see what is in front of us.

— Michael Zakian, Pepperdine University, 2015

In 1995, Zakian became the director of the Frederick R. Weisman Museum at Pepperdine University. He also was an adjunct professor at Pepperdine University's Seaver College.

== Later life and legacy ==
Zakian died in January 2020.

Zakian's papers are held in the collection of Pepperdine University.
