= University of New Mexico Art Museum =

Coordinates: 35°4′56.3″N 106°37′11.7″W

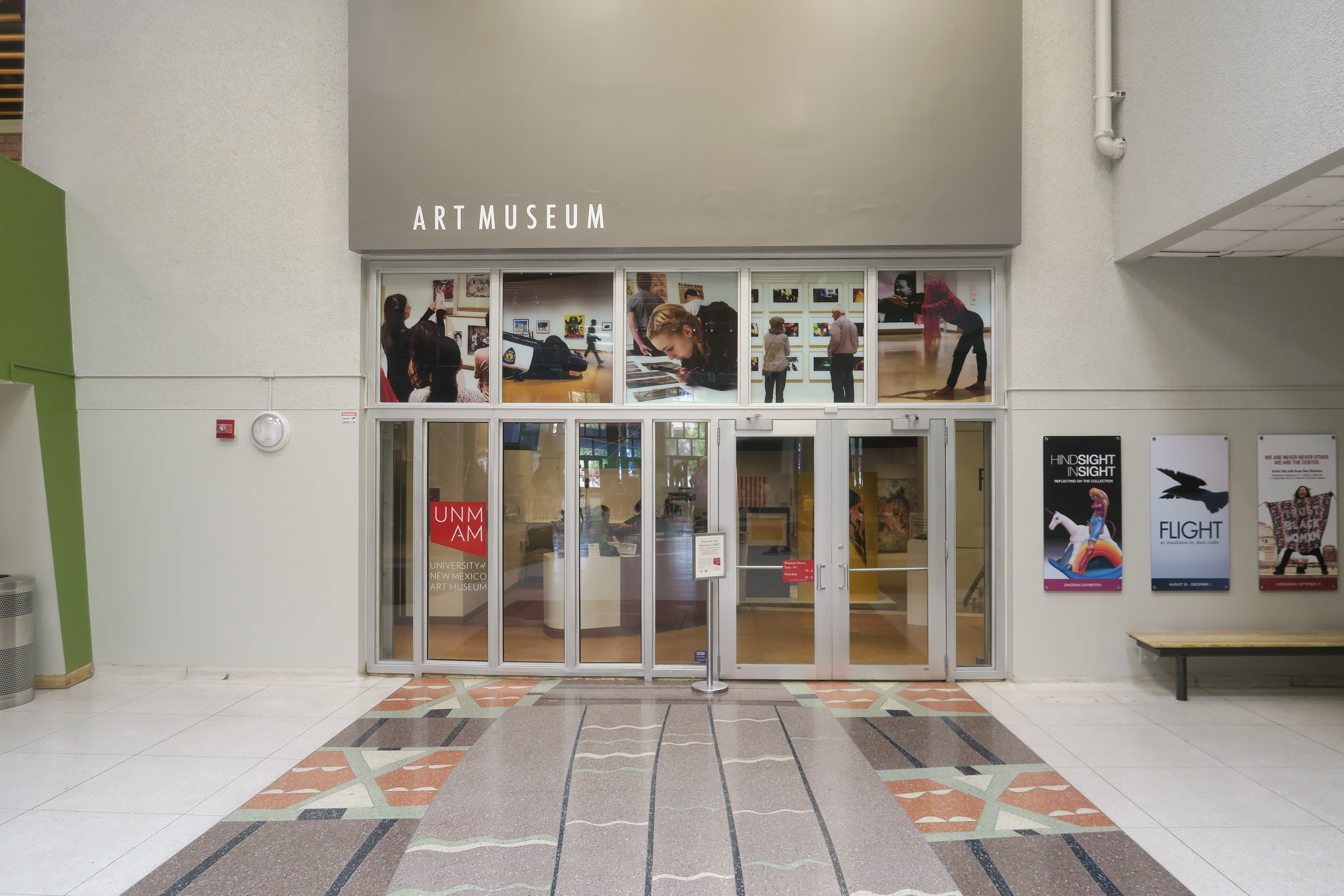
Entrance

The University of New Mexico Art Museum (sometimes referred to as the University Art Museum or UNM Art Museum) is an art museum at the University of New Mexico in Albuquerque. The museum's permanent collection includes nearly 30,000 objects, making it the largest collection of fine art in New Mexico.

== History ==
In the early years following the opening of the museum in 1963, significant exhibitions were held of the work of Georgia O'Keeffe, Bror Julius Olsson Nordfeldt, Cady Wells, Andrew Dasburg, John Marin, and other Modernists.

Van Deren Coke was the founding director of the Art Museum. Robert O. Parks was another early Art Museum director.

Georgia O'Keeffe had included the University of New Mexico and another New Mexico museum in her will of 1979, but in a codicil signed in 1984 soon before her death deleted it. An agreement between the State of New Mexico and Juan Hamilton, O'Keeffe's companion and executor of the will, was made in 1986, when the state agreed to drop any challenge to the will in exchange for several O'Keeffe paintings.

== Collections ==
The Art Museum's permanent collection includes the following collections:

Photographs and prints. This collection includes over 10,000 photographs (ranging from daguerreotypes to digital photographs) and over 17,000 prints (with a focus on lithographs). The earliest prints date to the Nuremberg Chronicle, which appeared in 1493. Many of the museum's photographs, prints, and early cased objects are housed in the museum's Beaumont Newhall Study Room.

Beaumont Newhall Collection. The museum holds a collection of works by photographer Beaumont Newhall, who became a professor of art history at UNM in 1971. The John D. and Catherine T. MacArthur Foundation provided grant funding for the acquisition of several works in the collection.

Theodore J. Labhard Collection. The museum holds 481 daguerreotypes, ambrotypes, ivorytypes, and tintypes purchased from the estate of California art collector Theodore J. Labhard. The great majority of the museum's cased images are part of the collection, which originally was part of the university's Department of Art and Art History.

Jerome Bowers Peterson Memorial Collection. The museum holds 82 photographs by Carl Van Vechten, whose work depicted many notable figures of the Harlem Renaissance from the 1930s through the 1950s. The collection came to the University of New Mexico in 1955–1956 after Edward Leuder, an English professor at UNM, published a biography of Van Vechten.

The Tamarind Archives are the archives of the Tamarind Institute (formerly the Tamarind Lithographic Workshop, Inc.), a lithography institute founded in Los Angeles in 1960 and part of the University of New Mexico since 1970. The Tamarind Institute is a division of the College of Fine Arts, while its Archives are part of the university's Center for Southwest Research at Zimmerman Library. The UNM Art Museum archives two impressions of every Tamarind edition, including both work from the early Los Angeles period and from the later Albuquerque period.

Clinton Adams Archive Collection and Clinton and Mary Adams Collections. The museum holds many works contributed by Clinton Adams, who served as dean at UNM. Adams donated impressions of all of his non-Tamarind print works in 1996, adding to his Tamarind lithograph works, which had already been added to the art museum's collection. Clinton Adams and his wife Mary Adams also donated the works of others, mainly in the area of 19th and 20th-century prints. These works were designated as the Clinton and Mary Adams Collections in 1997.

Raymond Jonson Collection. UNM art professor Raymond Jonson gave a museum a sizable collection in his bequest, including more than 1,300 of his own paintings along with several hundred other pieces by other artists, including other members of the Transcendental Painting Group of the 1930s and 1940s.

Old Master Painting, Sculpture, and Drawing. The museum originally chose to focus on 19th- and 20th-century works, especially photographs and lithographies, instead of Old Master works, many of which were prohibitively expensive or already in the collections of other institutions. However, several older works entered the collection even in the museum's early period, including a notable contribution by Jacob Polak of several pieces of Dutch and Flemish Old Master works. In the mid-1980s, the museum began efforts to acquire more Old Master works, and eventually acquired a number of older European works. The Albert A. Anella Collection in Memory of Mia Anella, donated in 1987, includes six significant Italian paintings ranging from the 16th to 18th centuries.

Nineteenth-Century Art. The museum holds a collection of 19th-century painting and sculpture from Europe and the United States.

Old Spain, New Spain, New Mexico. This museum collection includes works connected to Spain, Latin America, and New Mexico. The museum does not hold collections of art by indigenous peoples of the Americas; these are held by the Maxwell Museum of Anthropology, another University of New Mexico museum. The two museums have held joint exhibitions in the past.

Taller De Grafica Popular Collection. This collection includes some 300 prints and posters of the Taller de Gráfica Popular, the Mexico City art cooperative. The items in the collection are split between the Art Museum and the Center for Southwest Research at the UNM General Library.

Mary Lester Field and Neill B. Field Collection. This collection of 94 pieces of Spanish colonial silver and 22 mainly 19th-century santos (New Mexican religious sculptures) was donated by bequest in 1939 by Albuquerque mayor Neill B. Field and his wife Mary Lester Field.

Early Modern Art. The museum's collection of art of the early modern era include examples of New Mexican Modernism as well as works by Europeans artists such as Pablo Picasso, Wassily Kandinsky, Francis Picabia, and Karl Schmidt-Rottluff. Photographs and prints are displayed alongside paintings and sculpture.

Art Since 1950. The museum's collection of contemporary art focuses on American art, with particular emphasis upon works from California's Bay Area and Los Angeles.
