= Frederick R. Weisman Museum of Art (California) =

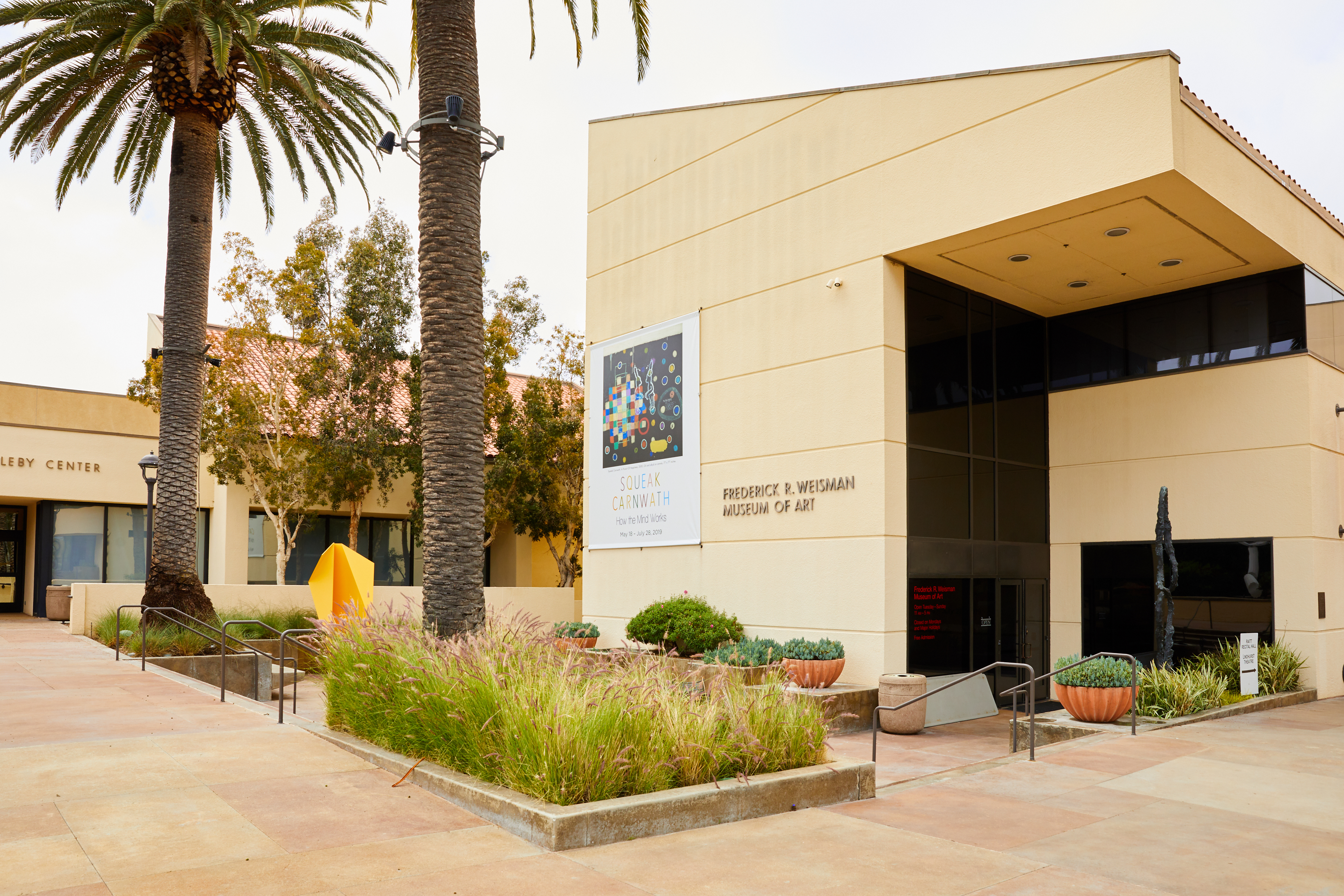

- Location within California
- Established: 1992
- Location: Malibu, California
- Coordinates: 34.039266°N 118.707914°W
- Type: Art museum
- Website: arts.pepperdine.edu/museum

The Frederick R. Weisman Museum of Art is an art gallery on the campus of Pepperdine University in Malibu, California. The museum was founded in 1992 with a $1.5 million gift from Frederick R. Weisman, a noted art collector and philanthropist. The museum exhibits art from around the world, but focuses on art from California.

== History ==
Frederick R. Weisman endowed the museum in 1992 with a gift of $1.5 million. Along with his gift, Weisman loaned the museum roughly $3 million of contemporary art from his personal collection. Weisman made his fortune as president of Hunt Foods and as a distributor for Toyota, and he donated to many artistic organizations and charities, including the Frederick R. Weisman Art Foundation in Los Angeles and the Weisman Art Museum at his alma mater, the University of Minnesota.

The founding director of the museum was Nora Halpern, who had previously worked as the curator of Weisman's private collection. Following a disagreement with the administration concerning censorship of an exhibit at the museum, Halpern left the university in 1994. In 1995, Michael Zakian was named the new director of the museum, and served the Pepperdine art community for over 25 years before his death on January 14, 2020. Andrea Gyorody, the museum's director since 2021, resigned in October 2025 after the University administration censored works in an exhibition she had mounted.

== Notable exhibits ==
The museum has hosted a number of notable exhibits, including Rodin's Obsession: The Gates of Hell in 2001, which featured 30 sculptures by Auguste Rodin; Chuck Close: Face Forward in 2015, a retrospective that featured over 70 prints by Close; and Andy Warhol: Life and Legends in 2016, which featured some of Warhol's most famous works.
