= Ronald Reagan in music =

Mentions of Ronald Reagan in popular music

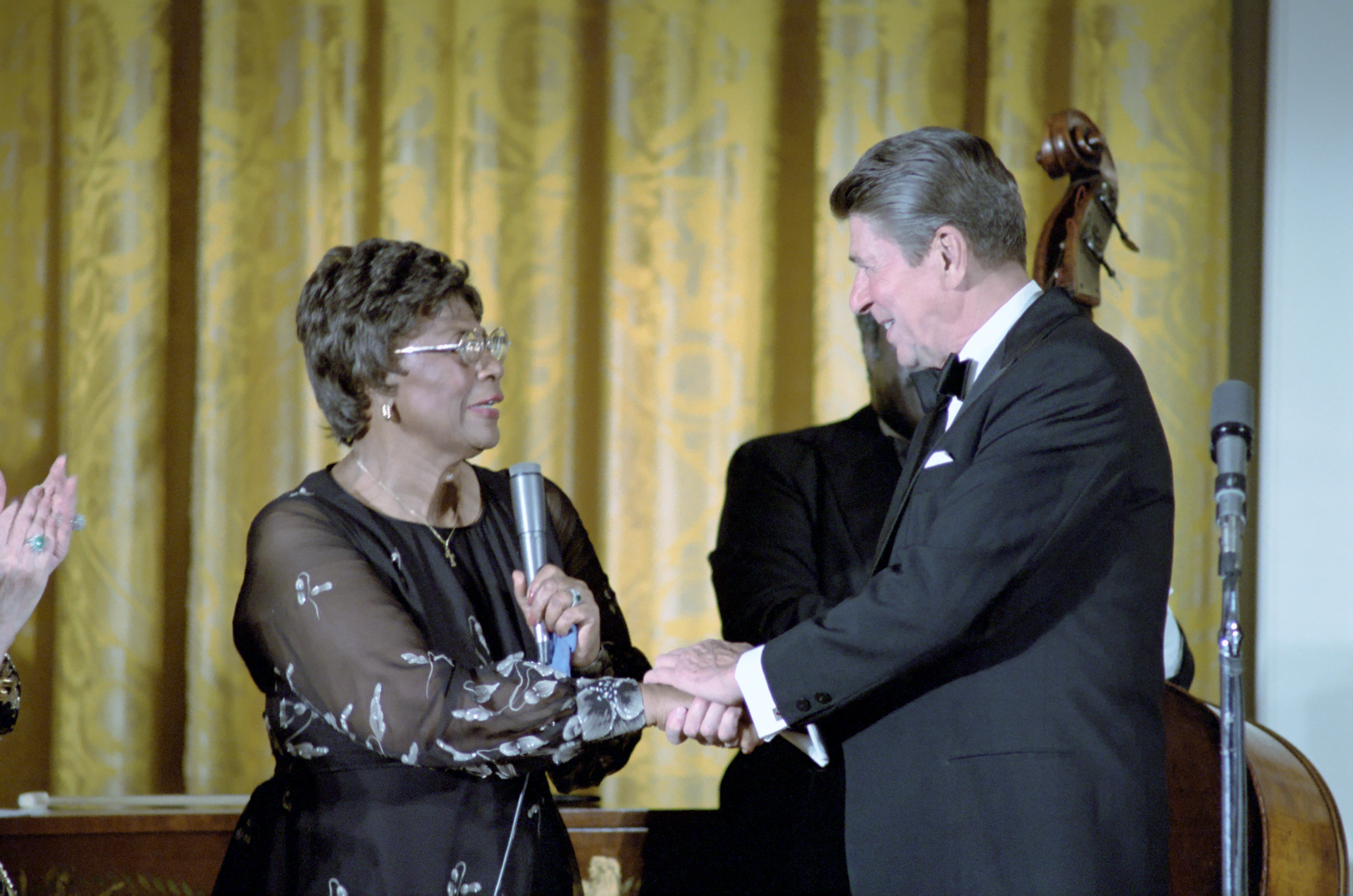
Singer Ella Fitzgerald with Ronald Reagan after her performance at the White House, October 1981

The appearance of Ronald Reagan in music includes mentions and depictions of the actor-turned-politician in songs, albums, music videos, and band names, particularly during his two terms as President of the United States. Reagan first appeared on a few album covers during his time as a Hollywood actor, well before his political career. During the 1960s, folk, rock, and satirical musicians criticized Reagan in his early years as Governor of California for his red-baiting and attacking of the Berkeley-based Free Speech Movement. In the 1980s, songs critiquing Reagan became more widespread and numerous once he ascended to national office and involved himself in the renewal of the Cold War, the nuclear arms race, social conservatism, right-wing evangelicalism, and his economic policies in relation to low-income people. While references to Reagan during his presidency appear in pop music, his presence in song lyrics and on album covers is often associated with the hardcore punk counter-culture of the 1980s.

The 1980s' surge in political songs about a current president marked a shift in the culture and helped define the soundscape of the decade, partly fueled by Reagan's attack on aspects of culture associated with rock and roll, namely sex, drugs, and left-leaning politics. While presidents Lyndon B. Johnson and Richard Nixon had been the subject of protest songs and politically satirical music during both the Vietnam War and Watergate scandal, presidents Gerald Ford and Jimmy Carter were mentioned only occasionally by songwriters in the 1970s. That changed with Reagan's presidency, which brought on echoes of his prior campaign against counter-cultural activists a generation earlier during his terms as governor of California. The arrival of music television added a visual component to many of these songs, as did numerous album covers that used the president's likeness in their artwork. Artists' access to digital technology and the rise of hip hop also made Reagan the first political figure whose voice was widely sampled in music.

With regards to musical taste, Reagan himself was a proponent of standards from Hollywood musicals and the Great American Songbook, running three campaigns to the tune of "California Here I Come". As a social conservative, he and his administration were sometimes at odds with the lifestyles and politics of popular musicians, and Reagan's time as president was marked by various miscommunications involving the Beach Boys, Bruce Springsteen, and others. Reagan's longevity as a public figure, and the legacy of music written about him, has driven musicians to continue making comments on Reagan well after his political career.

== Pre-presidency ==
While Ronald Reagan began involving himself in politics in the late 1950s and early 1960s, other cultural and political shifts in the United States coalesced to create a surge in protest music. Waves of African-Americans moving from the Southern United States to urban centers in the North, Midwest, and West during and after World War II helped to electrify the blues and hastened the evolution of rock and roll. A post-war baby boom meant that a large segment of the population was entering their teens at the start of the 1960s and became the de facto audience for this new music. Simultaneously the Civil Rights Movement and Vietnam War fueled folk singers like Bob Dylan and Phil Ochs to write and record numerous topical songs that reached a large fanbase of primarily young people. While President Lyndon Johnson's escalation of U.S. involvement in Vietnam was met with increased protests, Reagan began his campaign for Governor of California. Phil Ochs mentioned both Johnson and Reagan on his 1966 album, Phil Ochs in Concert. In his introduction to "Ringing of Revolution", Ochs sets up the song by speculating on a future where the last of the bourgeoisie are besieged in a mansion atop a hill. Ochs imagines a film based on his own lyrics:

It stars Senator Carl Hayden as Ho Chi Minh,
Frank Sinatra plays Fidel Castro,
Ronald Reagan plays George Murphy
and John Wayne plays Lyndon Johnson.
And Lyndon Johnson plays God.

Ochs interchanges actors and politicians and pokes fun at Reagan for following in George Murphy's footsteps: Murphy, like Reagan, had been a film actor and became president of the Screen Actors Guild (SAG), then went on to be a Republican U.S. Senator for the state of California. Reagan had succeeded Murphy as SAG president where he worked as an informant for the FBI during the Hollywood blacklist period. Two decades later, Reagan also ran for office and became California's governor.

Tom Lehrer made a similar comparison in his song "George Murphy", which opens:

Hollywood's often tried to mix
Show-business with politics,
From Helen Gahagan
To Ronald Reagan.

Helen Gahagan was also an entertainer turned politician, progressing from Broadway to U.S. Congress until Richard Nixon unseated her after claims that Gahagan was "pink down to her underwear". In Lehrer's song on his 1965 live album, he punctuates Reagan's name with a question mark, evoking a laugh from an audience who did not yet know that Reagan would sweep the gubernatorial election the following year. In a similar vein to Lehrer was Borscht Belt entertainer Allan Sherman, who satirized Reagan's governorship on his 1967 song, "There's No Governor Like Our New Governor," set to the tune of "There's No Business Like Show Business."

In 1969, Creedence Clearwater Revival mentioned Reagan in their science fiction-inspired song "It Came Out of the Sky" in which a flying saucer landing in the U.S. Midwest spirals into a commercial and political fiasco. In his lyrics, CCR frontman John Fogerty imagines how different sectors of the establishment would respond, with Hollywood turning the event into an epic film, The Vatican declaring it as Christ's return, then-Vice President Spiro Agnew proposing a tariff on all things Martian, and Governor Reagan suspecting a communist conspiracy. Fogerty wrote about his inspiration for the song's spectacle and its Reagan reference in his 2015 memoir, saying, "Walter Cronkite and Eric Sevareid are in there, big newscasters at the time. And Ronald Reagan—I call him Ronnie the Popular."

At Woodstock in 1969, Jeffrey Shurtleff dedicated his and Joan Baez's performance of "Drug Store Truck Driving Man" to "Ronald Ray Gun".

In 1970, Jefferson Starship referred to Reagan's policies and attitudes as governor in the song "Mau Mau (Amerikon)" on their debut album Blows Against the Empire. In the song vocalist Paul Kantner sings, "the dogs of a grade-B movie star governor's war" in reference to the previous year's actions taken against students at the University of California, Berkeley who were creating a People's Park as part of the political counterculture of the 1960s. Governor Reagan's Chief of Staff, Edwin Meese, had ordered the Alameda County sheriff to fire upon the crowds with buckshot, resulting in the death of one student and the hospitalization of 128 others. These directives had come from Reagan himself, who had been publicly critical of UC Berkeley administrators for tolerating student demonstrations. In his 1966 gubernatorial campaign he had promised to crack down on what he called "a haven for communist sympathizers, protesters, and sex deviants" on the Berkeley campus. In their song, Jefferson Starship countered Reagan's social conservatism with the line, "We'll ball in your parks".

== During Reagan's presidency ==
=== Novelty records ===
While Presidents Johnson and Nixon had come under lyrical fire from songwriters for the role they played in waging war both in Vietnam and against protesters in the U.S., songs about presidents Ford and Carter were scant in comparison. Exceptions include James Brown's single "Funky President" (1974); "Please, Mr. President" (1975), recorded by 10-year-old Paula Webb; and Devo's hit "Whip It" (1980).

On December 19, 1980, Stiff Records released "The Wit And Wisdom Of Ronald Reagan", a vinyl album containing the two tracks "The Wit of Ronald Reagan" and "The Wisdom of Ronald Reagan", one on each side and both entirely silent.

In 1980, producer Dickie Goodman spoofed the Carter/Reagan debates on his "Election 80" single, which used Goodman's then-popular "break-in" or "flying saucer" technique that interspersed bits of dialogue, written and recorded by Goodman, with snippets of popular songs. Goodman would go on to satirize Reagan on his follow-ups, "Mr, President," "America 81," "Washington In-Side-Out," "Election '84" and "Safe Sex Report" throughout Reagan's presidency.

While Goodman's novelty records dug more at current events and the political process than at the president himself, Reagan's return to major political office ushered in his renewed campaign against things often associated with the rock-and-roll lifestyle: promiscuous sex, illicit drugs, and left-wing politics. As had happened in the 1960s, these attitudes, along with Reagan's domestic and foreign policies, designated Reagan as a prime target for a new generation of protest music.

=== Pop music ===
==== 1981–1983 ====
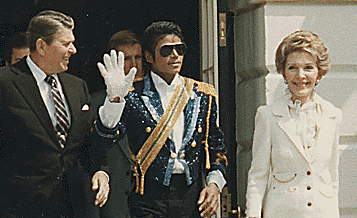
Michael Jackson with Ronald and Nancy Reagan

After Reagan's election as U.S. president in 1980, many pop music artists responded in their song lyrics. In 1981, "(We Don't Need This) Fascist Groove Thang" by British synth-poppers Heaven 17 slammed UK Prime Minister Margaret Thatcher along with Reagan, denouncing the leaders' policies as tending toward racism and fascism. The song was banned by the BBC over concerns of libel, but became a minor UK hit despite its absence from the airwaves. Scottish group the Fire Engines defied the ban by performing a live version of "Fascist Groove Thang" on The John Peel Show. Critic Stewart Mason later wrote of the song as an example of Heaven 17's "skewed perspective: on one level, the song is a straightforward condemnation of the right wing. On another...well, what exactly was a fascist groove thang? The lyrics put images of Margaret Thatcher and Ronald Reagan getting down P-Funk style into the listener's head." The song has since become a staple for other bands to play, sometimes keeping the original anti-Reagan lyrics, sometimes inserting other right-wing leaders in relevance to current political situations.

After Reagan's inauguration, Prince released "Ronnie, Talk to Russia" for the album Controversy, a song that Rolling Stone called a "hastily blurted plea to Reagan to seek disarmament." On the same record, the song "Annie Christian" envisions an angel of death responsible for the recent violent events, including John Hinckley's attempt on Reagan's life, the slaying of John Lennon, and a wave of infanticide in Atlanta, Georgia.

In 1982, Australian rock band Midnight Oil critiqued American military intervention in other nations' affairs on their single "US Forces." Singer Peter Garrett later said that "it's construed as an anti-American song but it was an anti-Reagan, anti-Republican song about what they were doing and the impact it was having on our country at the time." Two years after the song's release, Garrett ran for an Australian Senate seat representing the newly formed Nuclear Disarmament Party. After winning more votes than his opponent, other parties joined forces to refuse Garrett and his party a seat in the Senate. That same year artist Joseph Beuys released his single "Sonne statt Reagan", a play on a German phrase meaning "sun instead of rain" with the word for "rain" (Regen) spelled like the American president's surname. Beuys' sun-not-Reagan protest song was backed by members of Neue Deutsche Welle groups BAP and Ina Deter and was added to the collection of New York's Museum of Modern Art.

Blues musicians also sang about Reagan. Vietnam and Korean War veteran Louisiana Red recorded "Reagan Is For The Rich Man" backed by harmonica player Carey Bell in 1983. Red wrote the track after having been refused government benefits, and expresses preference for Reagan's western films over his politics. That same year blues pianist Champion Jack Dupree recorded the song "President Reagan" in which the former boxing champ accuses Reagan of helping the rich, ignoring poor people and veterans, and undoing the policies put in place by John F. Kennedy two decades earlier. Dupree also sings about being "so glad he only got two more years, and the world will be happy...and we won't shed no more tears," without the knowledge that Reagan would be voted in for a second term.

==== 1984 ====
In 1984 former Creedence Clearwater Revival guitarist John Fogerty alluded to Reagan once again for his single "The Old Man Down the Road". That same year Eagles drummer Don Henley released the single "All She Wants to Do Is Dance" in protest against the US involvement with the Contras in Nicaragua. In the song he chastised people for wanting to dance while sales of guns and drugs were going on at the behest of the CIA. Henley would later sing about Reagan as "this tired old man that we elected king" in a parting shot at the president as he was leaving office in 1989's "The End of the Innocence". Among 1984's other songs protesting the Reagan administration's role in the Iran-Contra affair were "Nicaragua" by Bruce Cockburn, "Lives in the Balance" by Jackson Browne, "Please Forgive Us" by 10,000 Maniacs, and "Untitled Song for Latin America" by Minutemen.

When Britain's ITV network launched the satirical puppet show Spitting Image in 1984, the first record released in relation to the show was a rework of the Crystals' "Da Doo Ron Ron". The Spitting Image version, "Da Do Run Ron," was a spoof election campaign song for Ronald Reagan, featuring Nancy Reagan listing reasons why he should be re-elected. The cover featured the puppet versions of the Reagans that appeared on the show and later starred in the 1986 video for "Land of Confusion" by British band Genesis. Chris Barrie, who voiced Reagan on Spitting Image, also did so on Frankie Goes to Hollywood's "Two Tribes". The song follows Reagan's career to an imagined future in which Jesus Christ can only return after a nuclear apocalypse, and Barrie, as Reagan, quotes Don McLean's "American Pie" and parts of an Adolf Hitler speech.

On the heels of 1984's presidential campaign, the rock group Supertramp featured spoken voice-overs from both Reagan and Bush on the right audio channel and their Democratic opponents Walter Mondale and Geraldine Ferraro on the left audio channel during the fade-out for their song "Better Days". The song's video reviews the 20th century through a retrospective montage of its hardships and the leaders who promised a solution. Beginning with the Great Depression and the rise of the Third Reich, the video sequences clips of military parades and battles moving forward to atomic test and other advancements in weapons technology, to footage of President Nixon, and then Reagan as his voice can be heard saying, "Our nation is poised...for greatness." In a similar vein, the last minute of Def Leppard's "Gods of War" is layered with soundbites of Reagan, Thatcher and the noises of missile launches and bombs exploding. In a departure from Cold War rhetoric, the two leaders' quotes are lifted from their justifications for the 1986 United States bombing of Libya and Britain's participation in the affair. Reagan can be heard on the track saying, "Message to terrorists everywhere: You can run...but you can't hide", and, "We're not going to tolerate these attacks from outlaw states...We will not cave in," ending with, "He counted on America to be passive...He counted wrong," in contrast to Def Leppard's anti-war lyrics.

==== 1985 ====
In 1985, former Police frontman Sting released "Russians", which hit number 16 in the Billboard Hot 100 in February 1986, and features lyrics leveled at Reagan, the Soviets, and both countries' pro-nuclear rhetoric, all set to Sergei Prokofiev's Lieutenant Kije Suite. Milwaukee folk-rockers The Violent Femmes imagined the president as "Old Mother Reagan", a dangerously senile grandmother who tries in vain to enter heaven in one of the group's most fiercely political songs. The same year jam band Phish made their own overt case against the president, sung as a letter to the first lady. Originally titled "Memo to Ronnie Reagan", the song "Dear Mrs. Reagan" mimics Bob Dylan's protest music of the 1960s but rails against Mrs. Reagan's Just Say No anti-drug campaign. The band continued to perform it until Reagan left office in January 1989.

That same year also saw the release of Dog Eat Dog, Joni Mitchell's synth-driven album co-produced by Thomas Dolby. The album's songs capture the headlines of the 1980s, including South Africa's apartheid and Ethiopia's famine, while critiquing the rise of mass consumerism and televangelists. Mitchell saw the rise of the religious right as a dangerous and manipulative force on US politics and likened Reagan to a puppet being manipulated by powerful religious leaders. Mitchell told The Guardian:

Reagan feels that Armageddon is inevitable and it's dangerous when you have a President who thinks that way since he's the one who can call for the pushing of the button. He sees himself in his personal drama, I think, increasingly as a religious leader and he has public lunches with some of these very powerful evangelists, Pat Robertson and The 700 Club for instance. In other words, you have the church stroking Reagan and saying "Yes, yes, aren't they saying nasty things about you, they must be communists. Therefore they threaten both you and me. Don't you think we should silence these communists from speaking?"

==== 1987–1989 ====
In 1987, INXS highlighted Reagan's Strategic Defense Initiative in their similarly named song "Guns in the Sky", and R.E.M. likened Reagan to former senator Joe McCarthy. U2's "Bullet the Blue Sky" from The Joshua Tree was inspired after lead vocalist Bono visited El Salvador during the Salvadoran Civil War and witnessed how the conflict between rebels and the US-backed government affected local civilians. During a spoken word passage of the song, he speaks of being approached by a man, "his face red like a rose on a thorn bush, like all the colors of a royal flush, and he's peeling off those dollar bills, slapping them down, 100, 200". Bono said the person he had in mind while writing these lyrics was Reagan, whose administration backed the military regimes in Central and South America that Bono encountered on his trip.

Frank Zappa was an outspoken critic of the Reagan presidency and what he saw as a pandering to the religious right wing. During a televised debate on CNN's Crossfire, Zappa said, "The biggest threat to America today is not communism, it's moving America toward a fascist theocracy. And everything that's happened during the Reagan administration is steering us right down that pipe." Several songs on Zappa's 1988 album Broadway the Hard Way ridicule Reagan, notably "Promiscuous," which jabs at the Reagans' attempts to reduce sex education in public schools and replace it with abstinence-only propaganda as well as his slow response to the AIDS pandemic.

On his 1989 album, Big Daddy, John Mellencamp's song "Country Gentleman" is "a scathing indictment on Ronald Reagan". Written and recorded during Reagan's final year in office, the song's last line thanks God that "he went back to California."

=== Punk rock ===
In the 1970s, punk rock emerged as an antithesis to the establishment, authority, and the status quo, and by 1980, like his British counterpart Thatcher, president-elect Reagan became a prime pariah for punks to rally against in both the United States and abroad. The widespread appearance of Reagan as a vilified icon in punk music particularly can be linked to the do-it-yourself model of bands releasing their own records and not being subject to the censorship of major labels, commercial radio or television. Reagan's rise to power also coincided with the arrival of a new subgenre: hardcore punk. Many hardcore bands put Reagan's face on flyers, T-shirts, and album covers, plus peppered lyrics, song names, and album titles with the president's various monikers, including "Reagan," "Ronnie," "Bonzo," and "The Gipper." Other bands would take Reagan's image into the sphere of stage theatrics, like San Antonio's Marching Plague, who donned Ronnie masks while performing their Black Sabbath-inspired tribute, "Reagan Man."

==== Bands named for events linked to Reagan ====
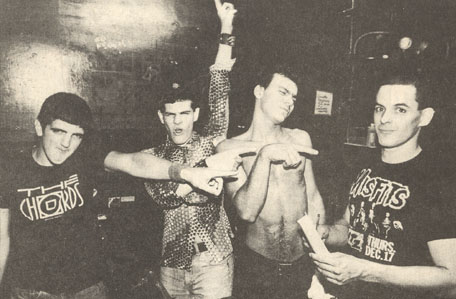
The band Reagan Youth from New York City, 1980s

A few punk bands went so far as to name themselves after the president or events related to him, the first being a self-proclaimed anarcho-punk group from Queens who, in 1980, named themselves Reagan Youth to liken Young Republican fervor for the president to that of the Hitler Youth during the Third Reich. The band's tongue-in-cheek theme song was penned from the perspective of a neo-fascist youth gang shouting, "Reagan Youth—Sieg Heil!" On the other side of the country, a skate punk band in Phoenix rebranded themselves as Jodie Foster's Army, or JFA, two weeks after the 1981 Reagan assassination attempt. Actress Jodie Foster had been the target of an obsession that Reagan assailant John Hinckley Jr. had developed since seeing her portray a preteen sex worker in the film Taxi Driver. Hinckley eventually attempted to kill Reagan as a means to impress the actress. Originally performing under the name The Breakers, one of JFA's first songs was about the assassination attempt, describing Hinckley's actions with the line, "Shoot the prez, shoot a cop, secretary too." When Breakers fans adopted that song's title—Jodie Foster's Army—as their own nickname and began showing up at Breakers gigs with "JFA" written on their clothes, the band decided to adopt it as their new name.

==== Dead Kennedys ====
San Francisco's Dead Kennedys made a career out of mentioning Reagan in songs like "Moral Majority", "We've Got a Bigger Problem Now," "Bleed for Me", and the track "Kinky Sex Makes the World Go Round", a spoken-word piece about World War III formatted as an erotic phone call between Margaret Thatcher and Reagan's fictitious Secretary of War. The band's 1986 studio album, Bedtime for Democracy, is a play on Reagan's film Bedtime for Bonzo and features a multitude of songs about Reagan. "Potshot Heard Round the World" is about US military actions in the Middle East, "with Reagans and Gaddafis cast as cartoon villains and heroes." Reagan plays the title role in the song, "Rambozo the Clown", a portmanteau of Sylvester Stallone's Rambo franchise and Bozo the Clown from children's daytime TV. The Dead Kennedys were done in by a lawsuit against their inclusion of H. R. Giger's Penis Landscape painting as an insert for the album Frankenchrist. Singer Jello Biafra was attracted to Giger's work as soon as he saw it, saying, "This picture is like Reagan America on parade."

==== Sun City Girls ====
JFA's label-mates, the Sun City Girls, released an entire Reagan-themed album in 1987 whose title, Horse Cock Phepner, was an alleged nickname for Ronald Reagan. The album was the band's most lyrical; an obscenity-laden "documentation of the American nightmare in all its incestuous beauty." The album's refraining spoken word track "Voice of America" makes mention of the president, and the album's song "Nancy" depicts then-First Lady Nancy Reagan as a sexual fetishist. The San Francisco based Angst also has a song named "Nancy" with similar subject matter. Other songs deride members of the Reagan administration, including Attorney General Edwin Meese, and the band recorded an updated cover version of The Fugs song "CIA Man" to be about atrocities committed by the CIA during Reagan's presidential terms. In a 1999 interview, the Sun City Girls' guitarist Rick Bishop said:

Other bands during that part of the '80's, both major and not-so-major acts, were really getting on the political bandwagon for one stupid reason or another. They were all so fucking serious, trying to be a voice for a generation or some shit like that, but worst of all they remained within the parameters of social acceptability. There was also a big censorship flap going on at the time. We looked at it as a chance to catch up with our obscenity quota.

==== Other punk acts ====
Other notable punk acts that sang about Reagan included The Ramones, The Clash, The Damned, The Exploited, NOFX, Suicidal Tendencies, Wasted Youth, T.S.O.L., Government Issue, Dayglo Abortions, D.O.A., The Fartz, The Minutemen, Dirty Rotten Imbeciles, MDC, Rosemary's Babies, Spermbirds, and The Crucifucks. Many of these groups, along with the Dead Kennedys, organized a series of "Rock Against Reagan" concerts and tours to infuse awareness of then-current politics into the punk subculture.

Some hardcore punk songwriters made a conscious decision to avoid putting Reagan in their lyrics. In wanting his music to outlast the administration, Washington, DC musician Ian MacKaye, who was in the bands Minor Threat, Embrace, Pailhead, and Fugazi during the Reagan years, has said, "I remember clearly resisting the urge to put the word 'Reagan' in any of the songs". Meanwhile, other members of the US hardcore scene took a different political stance altogether: In the late 1980s US skinheads spearheaded a patriotic right-wing faction of New York hardcore, and although bands like Agnostic Front and Cro Mags did not reference the president directly in their lyrics, their support of Reagan fell within their interpretation of patriotic backlash that reimagined hardcore without the anti-establishment ethos of punk rock.

=== Hip-hop and sampling ===
As hip-hop came of age during the 1980s, Ronald Reagan became the first president to make mention of its music and culture, and Reagan in turn became the first major political figure to recur as a subject in the genre. Proto-rapper Gil Scott-Heron made Reagan the subject of his 1981 song "B-movie" as well as his 1984 single "Re-Ron" focusing on Reagan's re-election campaign.

We Begin Bombing in Five Minutes
Sample used in songs by the groups Bonzo Goes to Washington and Moskwa TV.

The 1980s also saw the widespread use of sampling sounds for use in music, and as sampling equipment became more affordable, both experimental and hip hop artists utilized with greater frequency. Sound collage group Negativland first sampled Reagan on their 1981 album Points on the instrumental track "The Answer Is", where the music interrupted by the president stuttering, "The problem isn't being poor, the problem is, um, the answer is ..." The art rock band 3 Teens Kill 4 sampled Reagan and anecdotes about him in their 1984 song "Tell Me Something Good". In 1985 P-Funk bassist Bootsy Collins and Jerry Harrison from Talking Heads teamed up as the supergroup Bonzo Goes to Washington (named for Reagan's early 1950s films Bedtime for Bonzo and Bonzo Goes to College) to release a single that heavily sampled the president saying, "My fellow Americans, I'm pleased to tell you today that I've signed legislation that will outlaw Russia forever. We begin bombing in five minutes," during a microphone test. German Techno act Moskwa TV sampled the same phrase in the "bombing mix" of their 1985 dance track, "Tekno Talk".

A snippet of Reagan saying "out of control" was looped by DJ Jazzy Jeff, Was (Not Was) and EPMD. The president had originally used the expression in reference to the national debt and was appropriated by dance artists to entice their audiences. Industrial dance group Skinny Puppy also used Reagan's voice in their music. Their song "Far Too Frail" puts a spin on the president's prudishness as he is heard saying, "For years some people have argued that this type of pornography is a matter of artistic creativity." and in "State Aid" Reagan's voice is clipped to create a stammering effect that reflected his reluctance to address the AIDS crisis.

Afrika Bambaataa and John Lydon used the same sample in their 1984 video for "World Destruction" performing under the name Time Zone. The single's B-side also sampled Walter Mondale talking about Reagan.

Doonesbury cartoonist Garry Trudeau co-wrote an entire musical revue with Elizabeth Swados, featuring the song "Rap Master Ronnie." Hollywood actor Reathel Bean was the revue's star performer and in 1984 released a three versions of the song on a 12" single attributed to Reathel Bean & The Doonesbury Break Crew. There was also an accompanying video where Reagan and his posse of Secret Service agents go to a black DC neighborhood to rap for minority votes.

Other '80s rap songs mentioning or referencing Reagan include Grandmaster Flash and the Furious Five's "The Message" (1982), Project Future's one-off "Ray-Gun-Omics" (1983), Ice-T's "Squeeze the Trigger" (1987), Biz Markie's "Nobody Beats the Biz" (1988), Boogie Down Productions' "Stop the Violence" (1988), Public Enemy's "Rebel Without a Pause" (1988), and rapper Too Short's 1988 track "Cusswords."

=== Reggae and African music ===
The Kansas City's Grammy-nominated Blue Riddim Band, recorded the satirical track "Nancy Reagan" in 1982 about what the band considered to be misguided priorities on the part of the President and his wife. The song was later versioned by Ranking Roger in 1985 and by Big Youth in 2011. Fela Kuti featured demonic caricatures of Ronald Reagan, Margaret Thatcher, and other world leaders on the cover of his 1989 album Beasts of No Nation and mentioned them in the lyrics.

=== Music videos ===
The rise of the importance of music videos coincided with Reagan's presidency with the launch of MTV midway into his first year in office. Within a few years, references to the president in song lyrics were mirrored by his likeness appearing in songs' videos. One of the first to feature Reagan, and one of the first by an indie band to appear on MTV, was Randall Jahnson's video for the Minutemen song "This Ain't No Picnic." Shot for $450, the video intersperses shots of the Minutemen playing the song on a barren landscape with World War II propaganda footage of Reagan in a US Air Force Spitfire fighter plane, edited to appear as though Reagan was strafing the band with the aircraft's machine guns. The music video was in the running on the network's first Video Music Awards in 1985.

That same year Frank Zappa created a music video for his racially charged song "You Are What You Is." Though a somewhat conventionally produced video by Zappa standards, MTV blacklisted it because in it an actor made up to look like Reagan was depicted sitting in an electric chair.

Also in 1984, Frankie Goes to Hollywood released a video for their anti-war song "Two Tribes" featuring actors playing Ronald Reagan and then-Russian leader Konstantin Chernenko who were fighting as though they were professional wrestlers. The video was televised several times during the 1984 Democratic National Convention.

In 1986 Genesis collaborated with the producers of British sketch comedy show Spitting Image on the music video for their song "Land of Confusion." The video opens with a puppet caricatures of Ronald and Nancy Reagan in bed with a chimpanzee parodying Reagan's film Bedtime for Bonzo, and spirals into the president's fever dream featuring Benito Mussolini, Ayatollah Khomeini, Mikhail Gorbachev, Muammar Gaddafi, Richard Nixon, television celebrities, and the members of Genesis themselves. Reagan awakens drowning in his own sweat, fumbles for a bedside button labelled "Nurse", but instead presses the one titled "Nuke", setting off a nuclear explosion. The video won Best Concept Music Video at the 30th Annual Grammy Awards and was nominated for by MTV for video of the year. Village Voice critic Robert Christgau ranked the video number one on his year-end "Dean's List," and it made number three on the equivalent list in the paper's annual Pazz & Jop survey of music critics.

== Record sleeves ==
Reagan appeared as an actor and spokesperson on spoken word recordings as early as 1958 and was first pictured on album covers in the early 1960s. One notable recording was Ronald Reagan Speaks Out Against Socialized Medicine, a 1961 Cold War propaganda piece sponsored by the American Medical Association. In his speech, Reagan purports that Social Security is a socialist attempt to supplant private savings, and eventually concludes that, "Pretty soon your son won't decide when he's in school, where he will go or what he will do for a living. He will wait for the government to tell him."

The first musical album which featured Reagan on the cover was Ronald Reagan Recommends Award Winning Music from Hollywood, a promotional item produced by General Electric during Reagan's tenure as their spokesperson from 1953 to 1962. The LP features the General Electric Transcription Orchestra rendering such hits as "Zip-A-Dee-Doo-Dah," "White Christmas," and "Que Sera, Sera."

During the 1980s, Reagan's likeness appeared on jackets of records by musicians making political statements almost exclusively against the president. These include:

- Let Them Eat Jellybeans!: 17 Extracts From America's Darker Side, the compilation album released on the Dead Kennedys' Alternative Tentacles label in 1981, featured Winston Smith's artwork of the president in front of an inverted United States flag. Let Them Eat Jellybeans title was a portmanteau referring to Reagan's favorite candy and Marie Antoinette's monarchic "Let them eat cake" quip allegedly lobbed at France's starving peasantry two centuries hence. The phrase had gained popularity in the media after Reagan had cut food programs that supported children from low-income families, with military veterans during a hunger strike, and artist Jimmy Ernst incorporated the phrase into his collage work in the early 1980s. The album cover and title also inspired an ironic Reagan-era button worn by critics of the president and traded by pin collectors. For the album's 35th anniversary, artist Shepard Fairey made an original print combining the Reagan motif with other emblems of Winston Smith's work with the Dead Kennedys.
- Reagan's In, the 1981 debut album Wasted Youth from Los Angeles, featured a version of Reagan's face drawn by then-unknown hardcore punk artist Pushead.
- "Should I Stay or Should I Go", the 1982 hit single by The Clash, featured Reagan on some versions of the picture sleeve, while others depicted a photo of the band.
- Earth Crisis, the 1984 album by reggae group Steel Pulse, featured drawings of Reagan, Soviet leader Yuri Andropov, Pope John Paul II, and a Klansman, among others.
- "Bonzo Goes to Bitburg," the Ramones 1985 single, pictured Reagan's controversial visit to a German military cemetery in Bitburg earlier that year. Critics in the US, Europe, and Israel decried the presidential visit because among the 2,000 German soldiers buried there were 49 members of the Waffen-SS who had committed genocidal atrocities. The phrase "Bonzo Goes to Bitburg" was coined by protesters in the weeks leading up to Reagan's trip. Before the trip, Reagan ignited more controversy when he expressed his belief that the soldiers buried at Bitburg "were victims, just as surely as the victims in the concentration camps."
- "Five Minutes," the 1985 single by Bonzo Goes to Washington, the collaboration between Bootsy Collins of P-Funk and Jerry Harrison from Talking Heads, depicts Reagan on the sleeve, looking at his wristwatch.
- Feed Us A Fetus, the 1986 LP by Canadian thrash band Dayglo Abortions, adapted a photograph of Mr. and Mrs. Reagan with the US presidential seal in the background, adding to it is a fetus being served to the president on a plate. Earlier in his political career, Ronald Reagan had signed the Therapeutic Abortion Act six weeks into his first gubernatorial term. In 1972 Nancy Reagan make a public statement regarding her husband's decision, saying, "If we accept the right to take life before birth are we so far from making the decision after birth?" She went on to say, "I agree with the California abortion law passed under my husband, however, I believe it has been terribly abused". By the end of the Reagans' first term in the White House, they had changed their position on abortion, and in 1986 the president addressed a joint session of Congress, saying, "Today there is a wound in our national conscience. America will never be whole as long as the right to life granted by our Creator is denied to the unborn". By the 1990s, Nancy Reagan reasserted her public opinion of being "somewhere in the middle" in not supporting abortion while believing in women's right to choose. The Dayglo Abortions's name caused the band problems in both the United States and Canada, and the cover of Feed Us A Fetus resulted in an obscenity charge that was ultimately brought before and overturned by the Supreme Court of Canada.
- Beasts of No Nation, the 1989 album by Fela Kuti, critiques state-sanctioned violence in depicting demonic caricatures of Ronald Reagan, Margaret Thatcher, and South African prime minister P. W. Botha, among other world leaders on its cover. Artist Ghariokwu Lemi said of his illustration, "I chose to focus on these three personalities because on the global scene they were responsible for the state of affairs of the world. At that point in time, they represented the axis of repression as they supported and helped to prop up the apartheid regime in South Africa and its beastly human policies".

== Ronald Reagan's campaign music ==
=== Gubernatorial and first presidential race ===
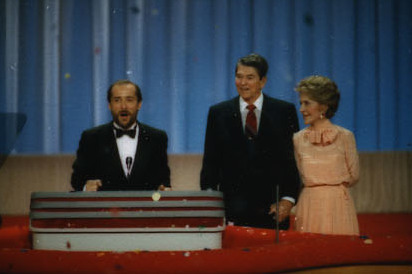
Country singer Lee Greenwood with the Reagans at the 1988 Republican National Convention

Both in his two terms as governor and during his 1980 run for the presidency, Reagan was introduced with the pop americana standard, "California Here I Come". The song was reworked into a jingle for the candidate opening with, "California, here we come, back where Reagan started from. In 1998 folksinger Oscar Brand recorded this version, along with other presidential campaign songs, for a collection released by Smithsonian Folkways.

=== Second presidential race and Bruce Springsteen ===
During his second run for president, Reagan held a public speech in Hammonton, NJ The campaign advisor, George Will, tried to co-opt Bruce Springsteen's "Born in the U.S.A." for the campaign. Will wrote that if "labor and management, who make steel or cars or shoes or textiles, made their products with as much energy and confidence as Springsteen and his merry band make music, there would be no need for Congress to be thinking about protectionism". A week after Will's writing appeared in a column, Reagan praised Springsteen in a stump speech given in Hammonton, New Jersey on September 19, 1984, saying: "America's future rests in a thousand dreams inside your hearts. It rests in the message of hope in songs of a man so many young Americans admire – New Jersey's own, Bruce Springsteen. And helping you make those dreams come true is what this job of mine is all about."

Soon after Reagan's speech, Springsteen expressed discontent with the president and his policies, and "Born in the U.S.A." was dropped from the campaign. Reagan's team then reached out to John Cougar Mellencamp to use his song "Pink Houses" and were turned down. The campaign then adopted "God Bless the U.S.A." by country singer Lee Greenwood. Greenwood played the song for the Second inauguration of Ronald Reagan and at the inaugurations of the next three Republican presidents.

Bob Dole and then Pat Buchanan also used "Born in the U.S.A." in their respective 1996 and 2000 campaigns, until Springsteen objected.

== Other events ==
=== The Beach Boys ===
The Beach Boys with Ronald and Nancy Reagan, 1983

In 1983 Reagan's Secretary of the Interior James G. Watt cancelled The Beach Boys annual Independence Day performance in Washington, DC, opting instead for crooner Wayne Newton and a U.S. Army band. The Beach Boys had played a free concert on the National Mall every July 4 since 1980 until Watt declared that rock music attracted "the wrong element" and that the administration was "not going to encourage drug abuse and alcoholism as was done in past years." Watt's social conservatism made him the target of public outcry and denouncements from both the President and the First Lady who declared themselves Beach Boys fans. Days after Watt's announcement, Reagan presented the Secretary with a plaster boot with a hole in it to indicate that Watt had "shot himself in the foot." Watt soon reversed his order and invited the Beach Boys back, but the band had quickly booked another Fourth of July concert in Atlantic City. The Beach Boys returned to a crowd of 750,000 on the National Mall in 1984 and performed at Reagan's second inaugural ball the following year.

=== Michael Jackson ===
In 1984, Reagan awarded Michael Jackson with the Presidential Public Safety Communication Award after the pop star licensed "Beat It" for TV spots against drinking and driving. Reagan's speech made several references to Jackson's songs. From the opening remark, "Well, isn't this a thriller," Reagan went on to drop allusions to the songs "P.Y.T. (Pretty Young Thing)" and "I Want You Back," as well as the album Off the Wall. Jackson himself said a total of 13 words at the ceremony.

=== Shamrock Summit ===
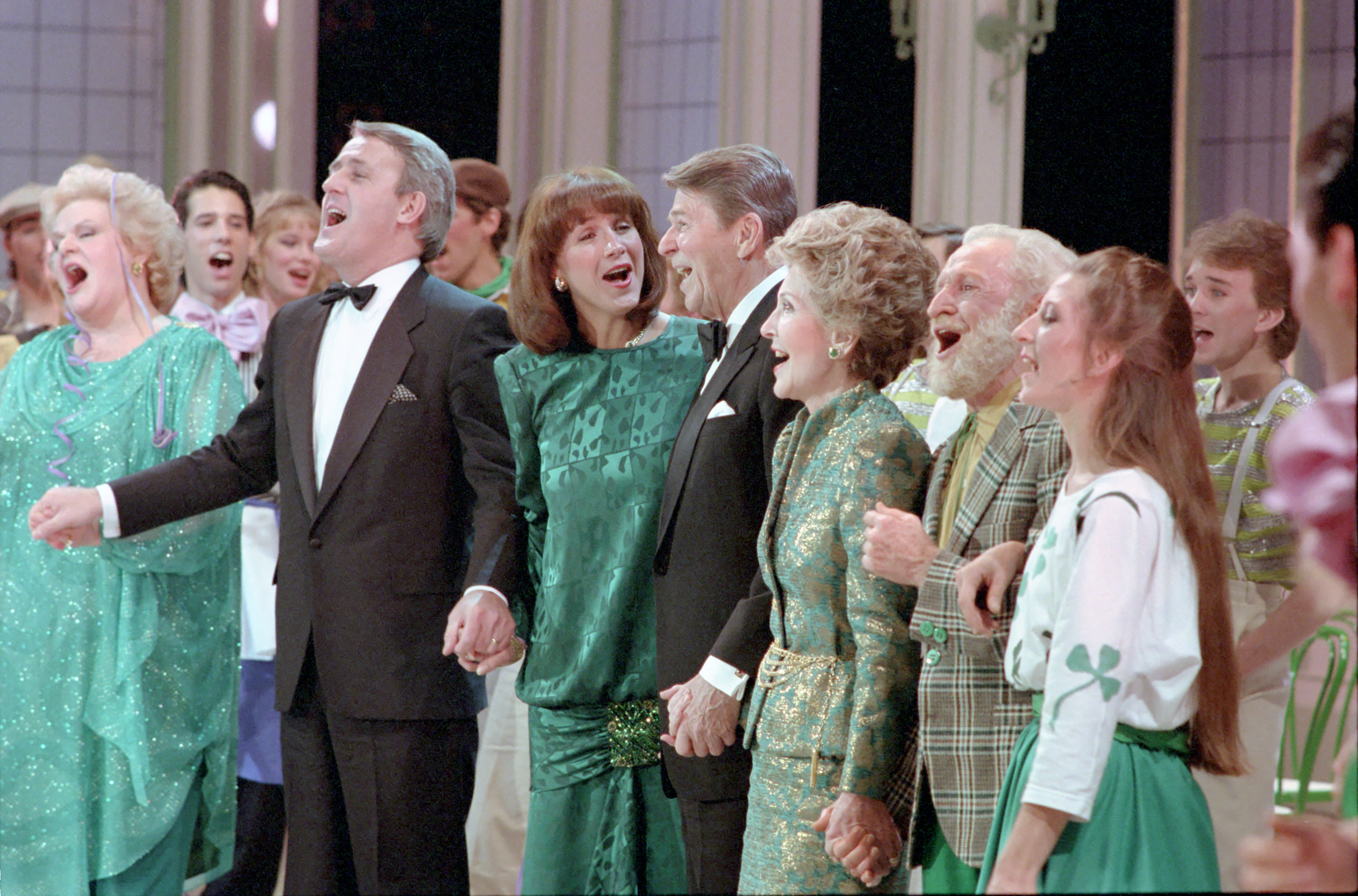
The Mulroneys and Reagans singing "When Irish Eyes Are Smiling" at the Shamrock Summit, March 18, 1985

A 1985 summit between Reagan and Canadian prime minister Brian Mulroney known as the Shamrock Summit was capped by a televised gala in which Reagan, Mulroney, and their wives sang "When Irish Eyes Are Smiling." Meant to celebrate both leaders' Irish heritage, the incident became contentious in Canada with critics calling it a "cloying performance" that symbolized the Mulroney government's excessive closeness to the Reagan administration.

== Post-presidency ==
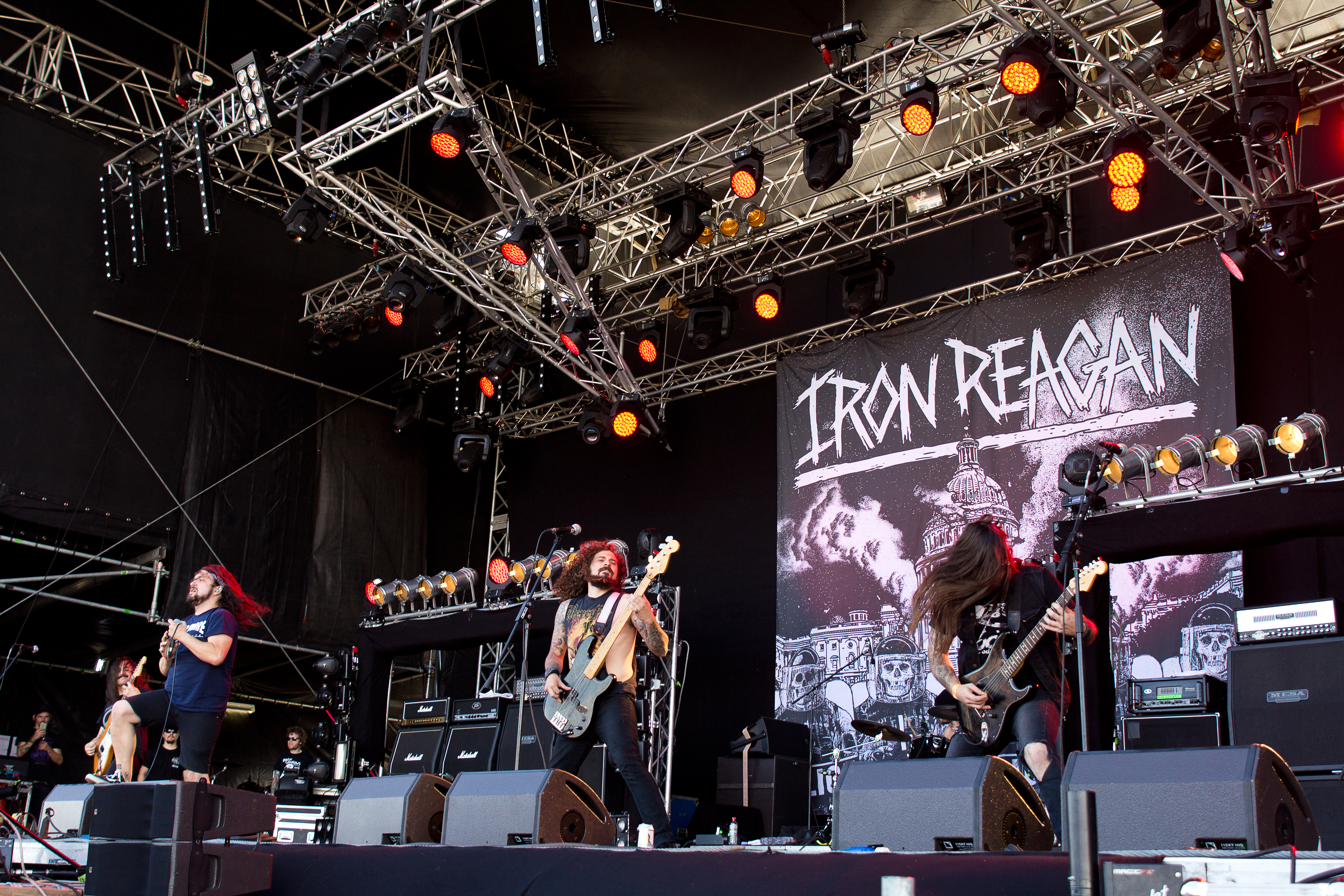
The crossover metal band, Iron Reagan, performing in Germany, 2016

Many artists from different genres have continued to make note of Reagan's legacy in their lyrics, such as Neil Young, Glenn Frey, Van Dyke Parks, Gwar, Camper Van Beethoven, Jay-Z, Kendrick Lamar, Killer Mike, Kanye West, and the Dead Milkmen. Billy Joel was one of the first songwriters to mention Reagan post-presidentially amidst his litany of American cultural and political events in his high-profile 1989 single, "We Didn't Start the Fire." ex-Beatle George Harrison threw both Reagan and Bush into a 1991 performance of "Taxman" released on his Live in Japan concert album. And New York City hardcore band Sick of It All revived that music sub-genre's prime pariah in their 1992 song "We Want the Truth".

Rage Against the Machine's 1996 album Evil Empire takes its title from name Reagan repeatedly used to describe the USSR. In an interview with MTV, Rage's frontman Zack de la Rocha explained, "The title Evil Empire is taken from what Rage Against The Machine see as Ronald Reagan's slander of the Soviet Union in the eighties, which the band feels could just as easily apply to the United States." That same year California punk band NOFX launched a parodic lament for the demise of songs that railed Reagan in their song "Reagan Sucks," which name checked 1980s hardcore bands Dead Kennedys, D.I., D.R.I., and M.D.C.

In 2006 folk-satire duo The Prince Myshkins released a song about Reagan named "I Don't Remember" for testimonials the president had given during the Iran-Contra Hearings.

In 2010 television actor Fred Armisen and ex-Scream/Nirvana drummer Dave Grohl paid tribute to their own punk rock roots in the Saturday Night Live sketch, "Crisis of Conformity", a send-up of an '80s hardcore band reuniting to play a wedding 25 years past their heyday. Chicago indie label Drag City later released a Crisis of Conformity single featuring the song "Fist Fight in the Parking Lot" whose opening lines "When Ronald Reagan comes around / He brings the fascists to your town" and subsequent mention of Alexander Haig are a sendup of similar lyrics by the Dead Kennedys and other 80s hardcore acts.

In 2011, American comedy musician "Weird Al" Yankovic's song "Another Tattoo" includes a line where the narrator mistakes his tattoo of Ronald Reagan for an ice-skating zombie.

In 2012, thrash metal band Municipal Waste formed the spinoff group, Iron Reagan. The band's name pays double tribute to the 1980s with a nod to the group Iron Maiden who enjoyed heavy airplay on MTV during Reagan's presidency.

Musical references to Reagan continued to persist in the late 2010s. Bright Eyes founder Conor Oberst's 2016 song "A Little Uncanny" comments on Reaganomics and alleges to explore a supposed irony that Reagan's charisma distracted from the 'darker' side of his policies. After numerous artists refused to perform during inaugural events for Donald Trump in January 2017, a 1980s cover band called The Reagan Years agreed to play at the All American Inaugural Ball at the Hyatt Regency Capitol Hill hotel amidst criticism for supporting a "bigot, womanizer, horrible man."

== See also ==
- Cultural depictions of Ronald Reagan
- Donald Trump in music
- Songs about nuclear war
