= Saura painting =

Indian tribal art form

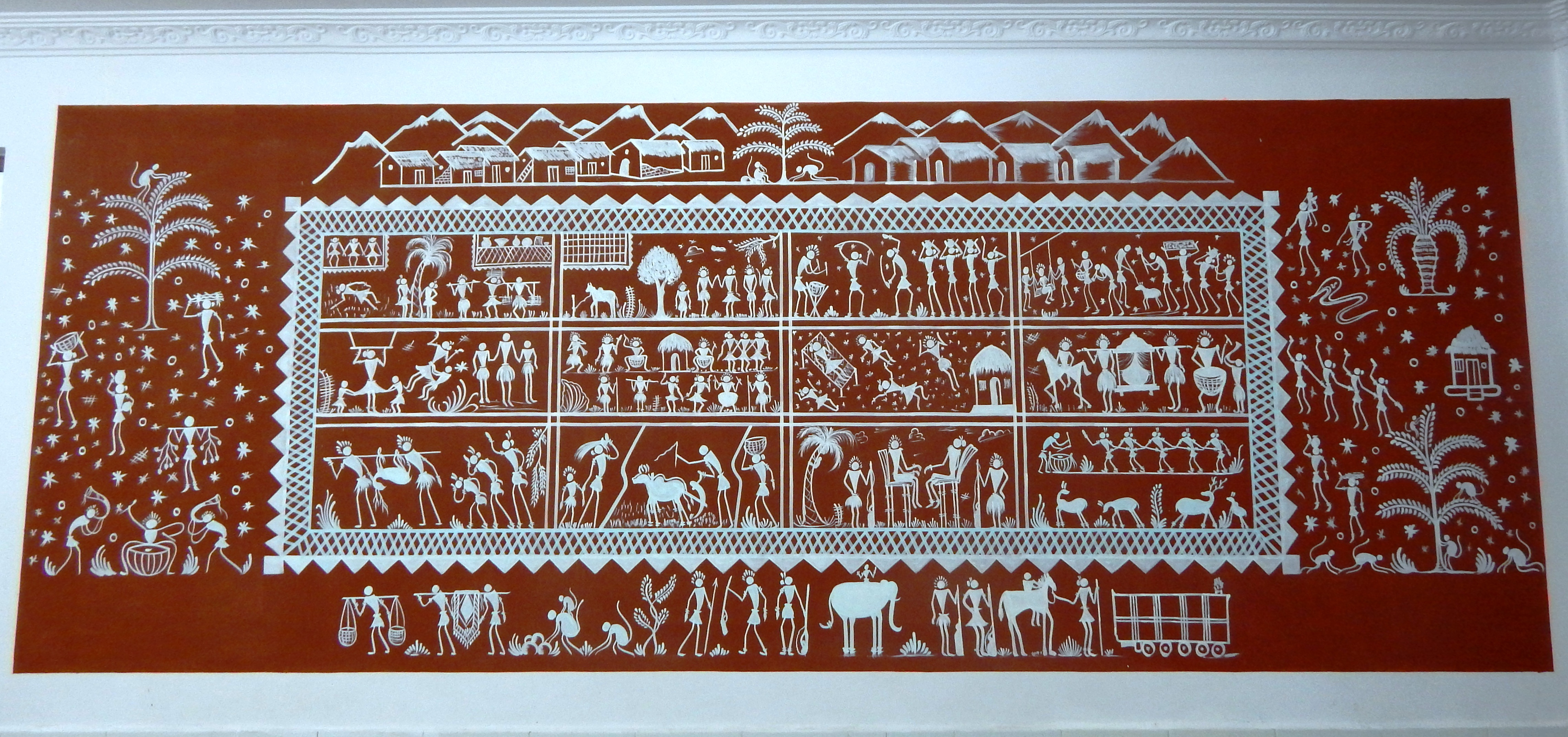
Idital painting

Saura (also "Sora", "Ikons", "Ekons" or "Italons") is a mural style invented and practised by the Sora people of Odisha, India. These paintings are visually similar to Warli paintings and hold religious significance for the Sora people.

== Sora people ==
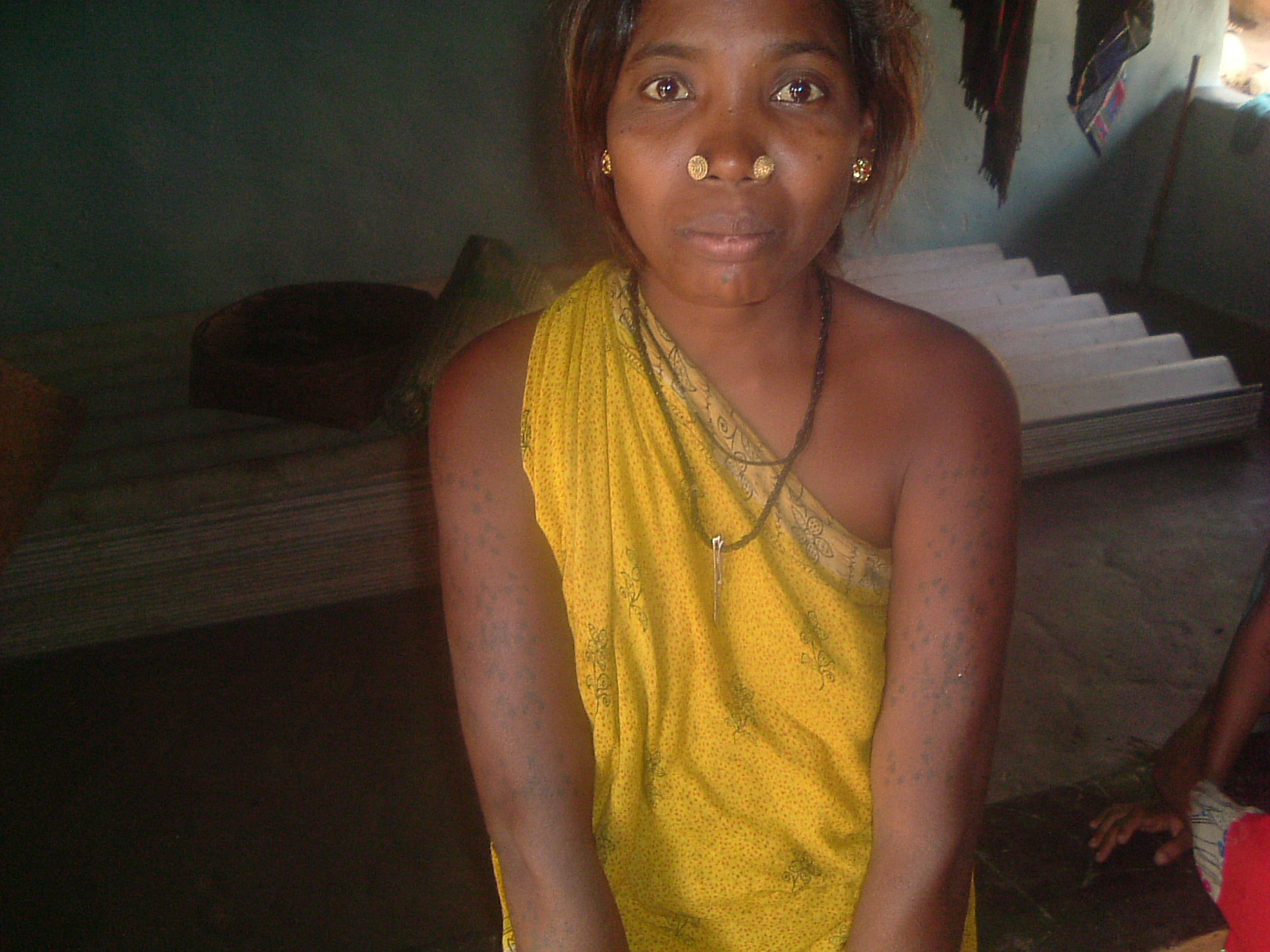
A Sora woman

The Sora people are a Munda Adivasi tribe in India. The Hindu epic Ramayana mentions of Savari, a devotee of Rama, the Mahabharata mention of Jara, the hunter who mortally wounds Krishna, are thought to have been members of this tribe. Myths related to the Hindu deity Jagannath also mention of the Sora people.

== Paintings ==
Indian Idital artist Namad Dalbehera speaking about the Idital painting

The Ikon paintings are an integral part of the religious ceremonies of the Sora people and are found mostly in the southern Odisha districts of Rayagada, Ganjam, Gajapati and Koraput. Outside the community, these paintings were first studied by the anthropologist Verrier Elwin. The paintings are dedicated to Idital (also "Edital") the main deity of the Sora people and they draw upon the Sora folklore, showing ritualistic importance. Ikons make extensive use of symbolically pregnant icons that mirror the quotidian chores of the Sora people. People, horses, elephants, the sun and the moon and the tree of life are recurring motifs in ikons. Ikons were originally painted on the walls of the Sora adobe huts. The painting backdrops are prepared from red or yellow ochre earth which are then painted over using brushes fashioned from tender bamboo shoots. Ikons use natural dyes and chromes derived from ground white stone, hued earth, and vermilion and mixtures of tamarind seed, flower and leaf extracts.

Ikons are worshipped during special religious and cultural occasions such as child-birth, harvest, marriage and the construction of a new house. Ikons are not commissioned frequently and an existing one can be regularly used for mundane rituals. The building of a new dwelling however necessitates the commissioning of an ekon, which is painted in a dark corner inside the home where its creation is accompanied by the recital of a specific set of prayers. Traditionally, Kudangs, the priestly class among the Sora people, painted the ikons since they also had the expertise to explain the symbolic import of the images contained therein to the villagers. Thus the ikons also became a part of the aural tradition of the Sora people that linked them to their traditions and customs. Today the Kudangs have been supplanted by artists and paintings are often executed in non-traditional locales.

== Comparison with Warli paintings ==
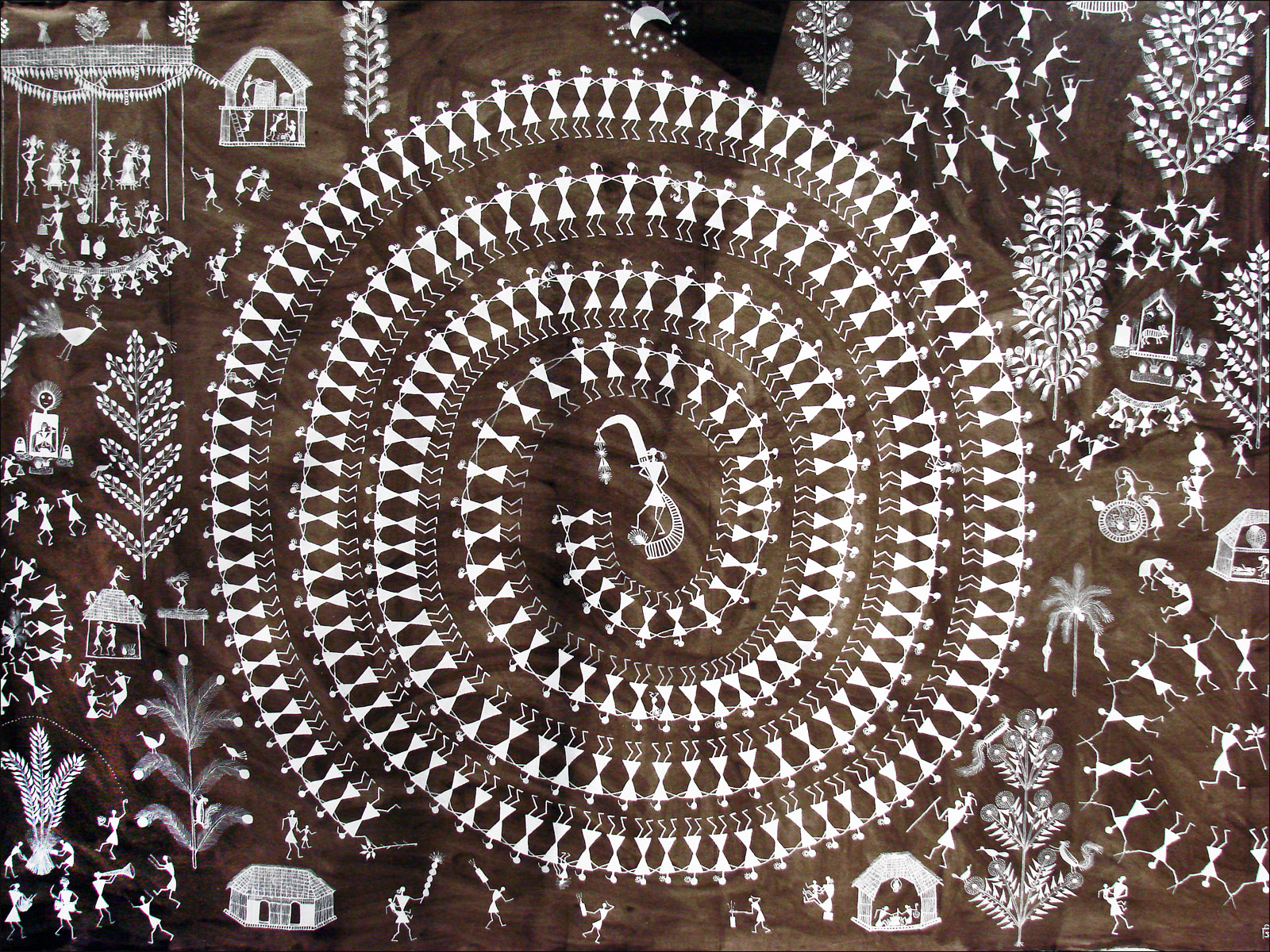
Warli painting from Thane district

Saura paintings have a striking visual semblance to Warli art and both use clear geometric frames for their construction but they differ in both their style and treatment of subjects. In Saura paintings, a fish-net approach - of painting from the border inwards - is used while this not the case with Warli paintings. Although both are examples of tribal pictographs that employ stick figures, Warli paintings use conjoint triangles to depict the human body while the figures are not as sharply delineated in Saura paintings. Also, unlike the Warli paintings where male and female icons are clearly distinguishable, in Saura art there is no such physical differentiation.

== Saura paintings today ==
Their diversity, detail and unique style have given ikons an 'in-vogue-appeal' and increasing popularity in recent years. The influence of markets and increasing awareness about the other's forms have led to both Saura and Warli paintings picking up details of technique and style from the other. They have also been popularised in recent times as an avenue for skill and job creation and have increasingly been used to decorate items like T-shirts, greeting cards, stationery and items of clothing. Saura pattachitra now becoming popular along with its mural painting.

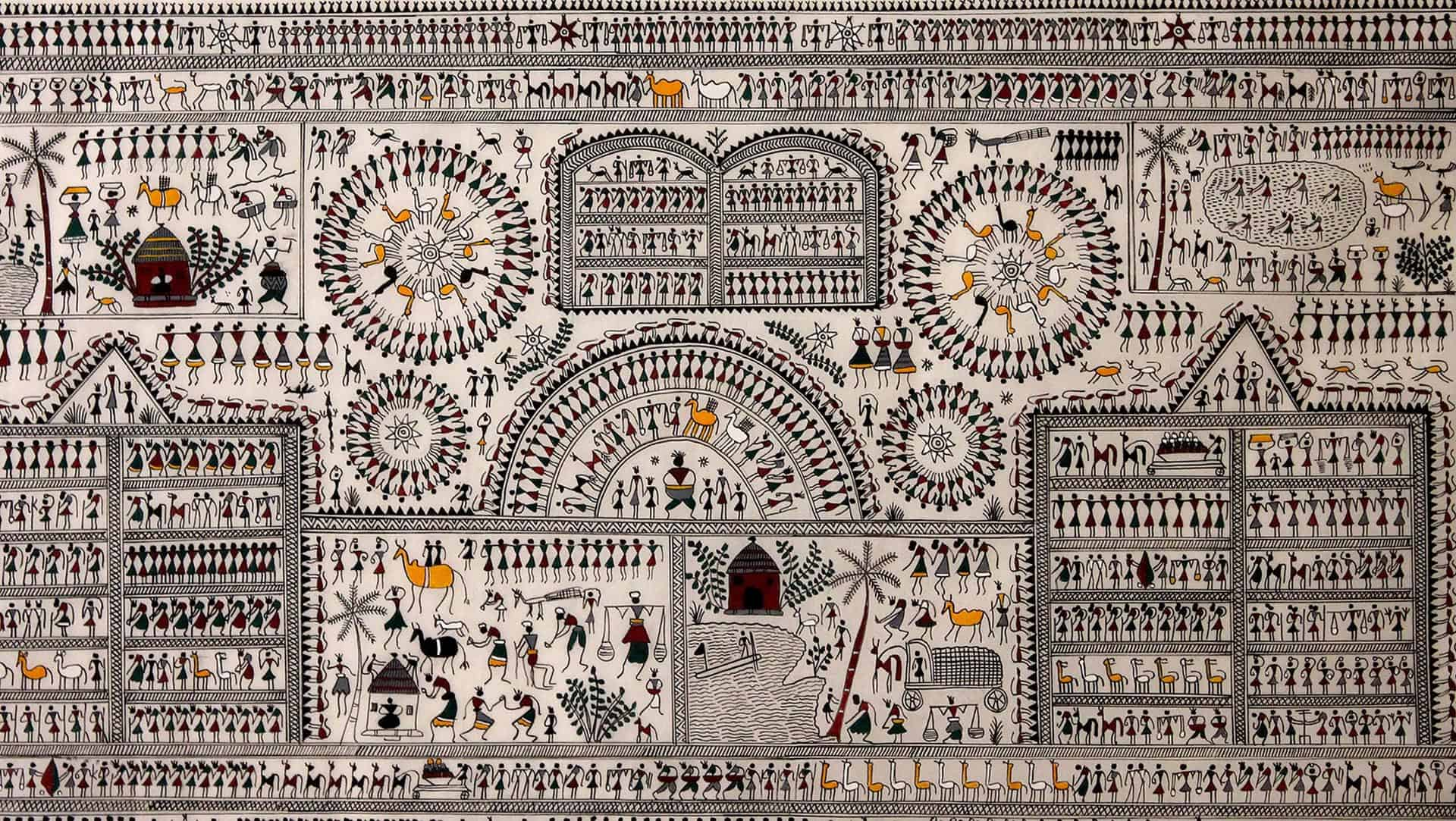
Saura pattachitra
