= The Bogmen =

Rock band

- Origin: Huntington, New York, USA
- Genres: Indie rock
- Years active: 1993–1999, 2001-Present
- Label: Arista
- Members: Billy Campion, Bill Ryan, Brendan Ryan, Mark Wike, P.J. O'Connor, Clive Tucker, Joe Quinn
- Website: https://thebogmen.net/

The Bogmen are an indie rock band from Huntington, Long Island, New York. The band was formed in 1993 by Billy Campion, Bill Ryan, Brendan Ryan, Mark Wike, P.J. O'Connor and Clive Tucker. Although they were signed by major label Arista Records in 1995, they fell just short of mainstream success. Despite breaking up in 1999, they have reunited several times in order to raise money for charity, and have produced a DVD. They currently play a few times a year in New York City and the Long Island area.

== History ==
Billy Campion met Bill and Brendan Ryan in the late 1970s. Sharing a passion for music, they started a band, The Plummers. During college, the group picked up bassist Mark Wike, drummer Clive Tucker and percussionist P. J. O'Connor. With this lineup, the band called itself The Bogmen, in honor of what Campion called its "tribal, huntish" sound. In 1995, after playing at every bar, club and retirement home in the tri-state area, the band from Long Island was signed to Arista Records and released its first album Life Begins at 40 Million which was produced by Jerry Harrison of Talking Heads. The band then concentrated on live shows and toured around the United States with bands such as Barenaked Ladies, before releasing the 1997 live album Bogmen Live which was also released by Arista. After switching producers, the band then tapped Bill Laswell and Godfrey Diamond before heading back into the studio and recorded the album Closed Captioned Radio in 1998 before disbanding. Brendan Ryan's wife was killed in the September 11th Attacks. Shortly thereafter, the band reunited for a benefit concert at Irving Plaza which resulted in the release of the live album Love at Irving Plaza, 2001. The band played well-attended holiday shows at Manhattan venues in the following years and released a studio EP Looking For Heaven In The Barrio in 2010, as well as several singles. In 2015 the band played a benefit show in their hometown.

== Discography ==
- Life Begins at 40 Million (1995)
- Bogmen Live (1997)
- Closed Captioned Radio (1998)
- Love at Irving Plaza, 2001 (2001)
- Looking for Heaven in the Barrio (2010)
- In My Kingdom (2023)
