= Closed Captioned Radio =

Studio album by The Bogmen
- Released: 1998
- Genre: Alternative rock
- Label: Arista
- Producer: Bill Laswell, Godfrey Diamond, The Bogmen

The Bogmen chronology
Life Begins at 40 Million (1995)	Closed Captioned Radio (1998)

Closed Captioned Radio is the second album by the American alternative rock band the Bogmen, released in 1998. It sold around 10,000 copies. The band broke up after its release, in part due to the effects of alcoholism.

The album's first single was "Mexico".

== Production ==
The album was produced by Bill Laswell, Godfrey Diamond, and the band.

== Critical reception ==
Professional ratings
Review scores
Source	Rating
AllMusic	4/5 stars
The Baltimore Sun	2.5/4 stars
The San Diego Union-Tribune	2.5/4 stars

Billboard determined that the album projects "a decadent, dissonant vibe reminiscent of David Bowie's late-'70s and early-'80s work, as well as of the cabaret music of 1920s Berlin." The Austin American-Statesman thought that "this band is not an easy listen because they're so stylistically all-over-the-place that you never fall into the comfort zone that good pop music provides." The San Diego Union-Tribune declared: "One moment, the music is a seamless blend of flute-filled melodies contrasted with electronic rhythms and triumphant, echoing chants; the next, all too bizarre noises, pounding drumbeats and distorted instruments beckon one to turn this Radio off (or shoot it)."

The Baltimore Sun stated that "the band's sound—mid-period David Bowie with a healthy dose of David Byrne—isn't quite like anything else out there." Newsday concluded that "like a latter-day Wall of Voodoo, The Bogmen layer poetry about everyday madness over quirky rhythms." The Columbus Dispatch deemed the album "a melodic form of heavy metal resonant with faintly sinister themes ... Bill Laswell's production puts an added emphasis on the sextet's rhythm section."

AllMusic wrote: "Influenced by such diverse global sources as Middle Eastern rhythms and Far East textures, the group's alt-rock aesthetic takes on intriguing new dimensions."

== Track listing ==
1. "Failing Systems"
2. "Speedfreak Lullaby"
3. "Mexico"
4. "Highway of Shame"
5. "Mad Larry"
6. "Extended Family"
7. "Every Man Is an Orphan"
8. "Dark Waltz"
9. "Sloth"
10. "The Cows Ain't Comin' Home Tonight"
11. "Seadog"
12. "Closed Captioned Radio"
13. "You Are My Destiny"
