= Rev It Up (song) =

1988 single by Jerry Harrison: Casual Gods

Single by Jerry Harrison: Casual Gods

from the album Casual Gods
- B-side: "Bobby" (Aboriginal mix)
- Released: January 18, 1988
- Studio: D.V. (Milwaukee, Wisconsin)
- Genre: Funk rock
- Length: 4:10 (album version); 3:30 (edit)
- Label: Sire
- Songwriters: Jerry Harrison; John Sieger; Ernie Brooks
- Producer: Jerry Harrison

Jerry Harrison singles chronology
"Five Minutes" (1984)	"Rev It Up" (1988)	"Man with a Gun" (1988)

Music video
- "Rev It Up" on YouTube

"Rev It Up" is a song by American musician Jerry Harrison, performed with his band Casual Gods. Written by Harrison, John Sieger, and Ernie Brooks, the song features a prominent guitar riff created by Harrison and Alex Weir of American funk band the Brothers Johnson. The track was recorded in a bomb shelter in Milwaukee, Wisconsin, along with most of Harrison's second album, Casual Gods (1988), on which the song appears as the opening track.

"Rev It Up" was released as the album's lead single in the United States in January 1988. The song reached number seven on the US Billboard Album Rock Tracks chart and became a top-10 hit in Australia and New Zealand, peaking at numbers three and six, respectively. The song's music video, directed by Harrison and produced by Bell One Productions, was filmed in New York and features babies at a biker bar riding Big Wheels.

== Background ==
In the 2021 podcast "This Must Be Talking Heads", Jerry Harrison explained that before the song's creation and in between recording sessions with Talking Heads, he had returned to his hometown of Milwaukee, Wisconsin, to support his mother. He eventually met a young group of musicians and asked them if they knew where the best recording studio in the city was, and they suggested recording with David Vartanian—whom Harrison had been acquainted with during his childhood—in a studio he had built in a bomb shelter. Vartanian agreed to rent Harrison the studio, and he recorded the entire Casual Gods album there except for "A.K.A. Love", which was recorded at Sigma Sound Studios in New York City.

Speaking about "Rev It Up", Harrison said that the song sounds like an Eddie Cochran track. Alex Weir came up with the track's primary guitar riff during a jam session with Harrison. After creating additional riffs with Weir and several more parts of the instrumental, Harrison began writing the lyrics about a familiar topic: a boy and a girl driving in a car. Harrison co-wrote the rest of the song with John Sieger and Ernie Brooks and produced it himself. "Rev It Up" appears as the opening track on Casual Gods, which was released on January 12, 1988. The single was released in the United States the following week.

== Chart performance ==
On February 6, 1988, "Rev It Up" debuted at number 35 on the US Billboard Album Rock Tracks chart. Nine weeks later, on April 9, the song ascended to its peak of number seven, where it stayed for two weeks. The song spent a total of 16 weeks on the chart's top 50 before leaving in May 1988. In Australia, the song debuted on the Australian Music Report in March and went on to peak at number three on May 9, 1988. The single was also a top-10 hit in New Zealand, where it charted for 15 weeks and peaked at number six on the RIANZ Singles Chart in June 1988. In Europe, the song charted in the United Kingdom and West Germany, peaking at number 90 in the former country and number 45 in the latter; it is Harrison's only charting solo single in both nations. "Rev It Up" additionally charted in South Africa, peaking at number 14 on the Springbok Radio chart and staying in the top 20 for three weeks.

== Track listings ==
US 7-inch single

A. "Rev It Up" (edit) – 3:30
B. "Bobby" (Aboriginal mix) – 6:58

Non-US 7-inch single

A. "Rev It Up" – 4:10
B. "Bobby" (Aboriginal mix) – 6:58

12-inch single and European maxi-CD single

A1. "Rev It Up" (To Heller and Back mix) – 5:34
B1. "Rev It Up" (Bad Bruce's Wisconsin dub) – 6:38
B2. "Bobby" (Aboriginal mix) – 6:58

UK CD single

1. "Rev It Up" – 4:11
2. "Rev It Up" (To Heller and Back mix) – 5:54
3. "Bobby" (Aboriginal mix) – 6:59

European CD Video single

1. "Rev It Up" (audio) – 4:10
2. "Rev It Up" (To Heller and Back mix audio) – 5:55
3. "Bobby" (audio) – 6:59
4. "Rev It Up" (video) – 3:48

== Credits and personnel ==
Credits are taken from the Casual Gods album booklet.

Studios

- Recorded at D.V. Recording (Milwaukee, Wisconsin)
- Mastered at Sterling Sound (New York City)

Personnel

- Jerry Harrison – writing, vocals, guitar, keyboards, production
- John Sieger – writing
- Ernie Brooks – writing, assistant production
- Arlene Holmes – vocals
- Alex Weir – guitars
- Bernie Worrell – keyboards
- Chris Spedding – bass
- Rick Jaeger – drums
- Jim Liban – horns
- David Vartanian – recording
- John "Tokes" Potoker – mixing
- Jack Skinner – mastering

== Charts ==
=== Weekly charts ===
Chart (1988)	Peak position
Australia (Australian Music Report)	3
Italy Airplay (Music & Media)	20
New Zealand (Recorded Music NZ)	6
South Africa (Springbok Radio)	14
UK Singles (Official Charts)	90
US Album Rock Tracks (Billboard)	7
West Germany (GfK)	45

=== Year-end charts ===
Chart (1988)	Position
New Zealand (RIANZ)	40
US Album Rock Tracks (Billboard)	31

== Release history ==
Region	Date	Format(s)	Label(s)	Ref.
United States	January 18, 1988	—N/a	Sire	
United Kingdom	September 5, 1988	7-inch vinyl; 12-inch vinyl; CD	Fontana; Phonogram	
