= Idital =

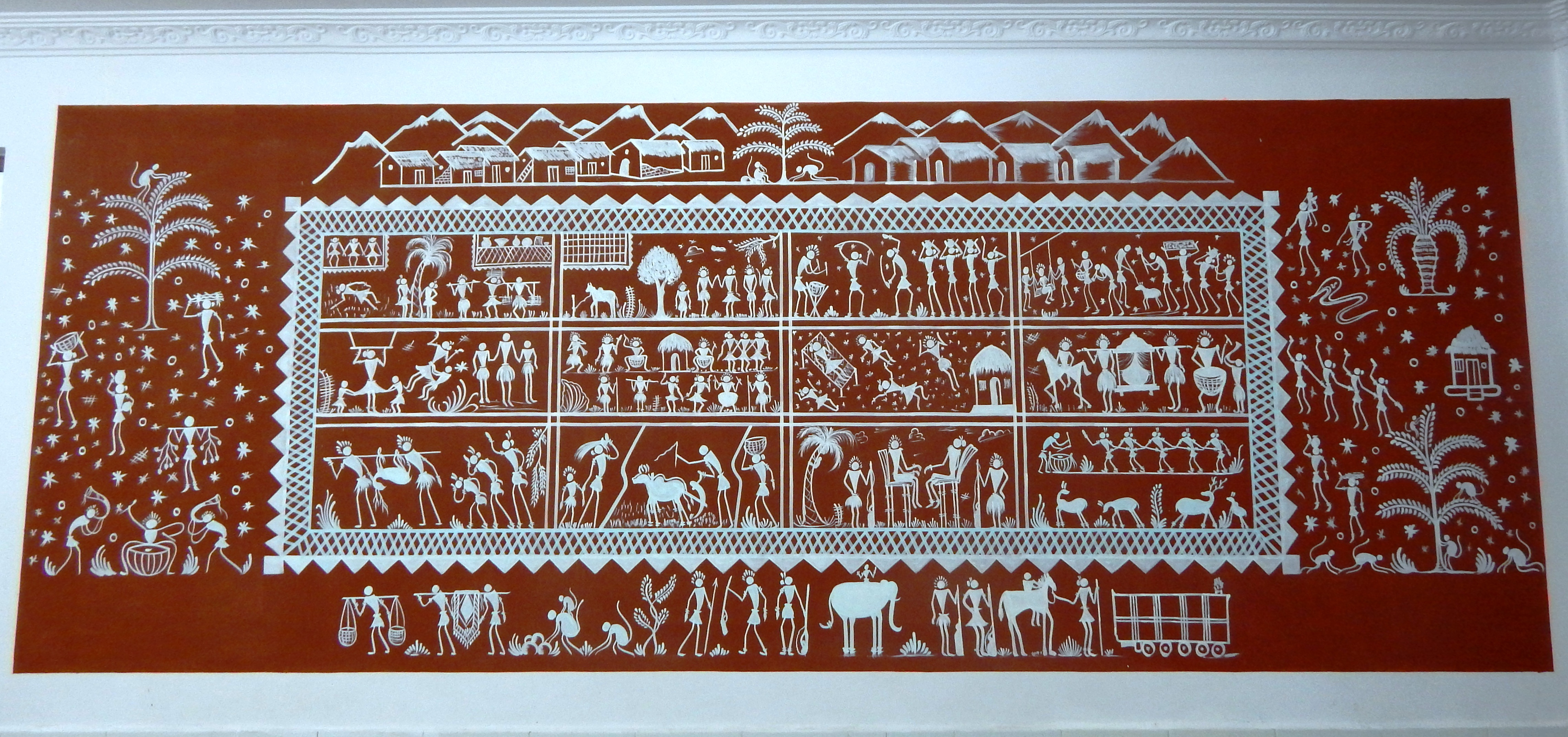
"Idital" -a form of Soura Wall Painting of Rayagada District

Indian Idital artist Namad Dalbehera speaking about the Idital painting in Sora language

Idital or Edital is a form of Indian painting from the state of Odisha. It is a kind of Saura painting that was invented and is practiced by the Sora people who mostly live in Rayagada, Gajapati and Koraput districts of Odisha. The artisans paint Idital as a symbol of devotion to the tribal deity "Idital" or "Edital". Each piece of Idital painting contains symbols and signs and each one of them convey a distinct meaning. "Jodisum" and "Jananglasum" are two known Idital styles.

== Origin and History ==
Seven out of the 62 tribes of Odisha decorate their wall with mural paintings. Sora are known for their wide range of painting styles based on religious and ceremonial themes. They have invariably religious association for which they are called italon or ikon. Ikons used to be originally painted on the walls of the adobe huts of the Sora people. Ikons are worshipped during special religious and cultural occasions such as child-birth, harvest, marriage and the construction of a new house. Iditals are generally made to pay tribute to the deities and ancestors.

== Theme, color and style ==
The iconic line drawings of Idital are based on simple geometrical forms. Humans, horses, elephants, the sun, the moon and the tree of life are some of the recurring motifs in the ikons. The backgrounds of the paintings are prepared from red or yellow ochre earth which is then painted over using brushes created from tender bamboo shoots. Natural dyes and chromes derived from ground white stone, hued earth, and vermilion and mixtures of tamarind seed, flower and leaf extracts are used for Ikons.
