= Alex Weir (musician) =

American musician

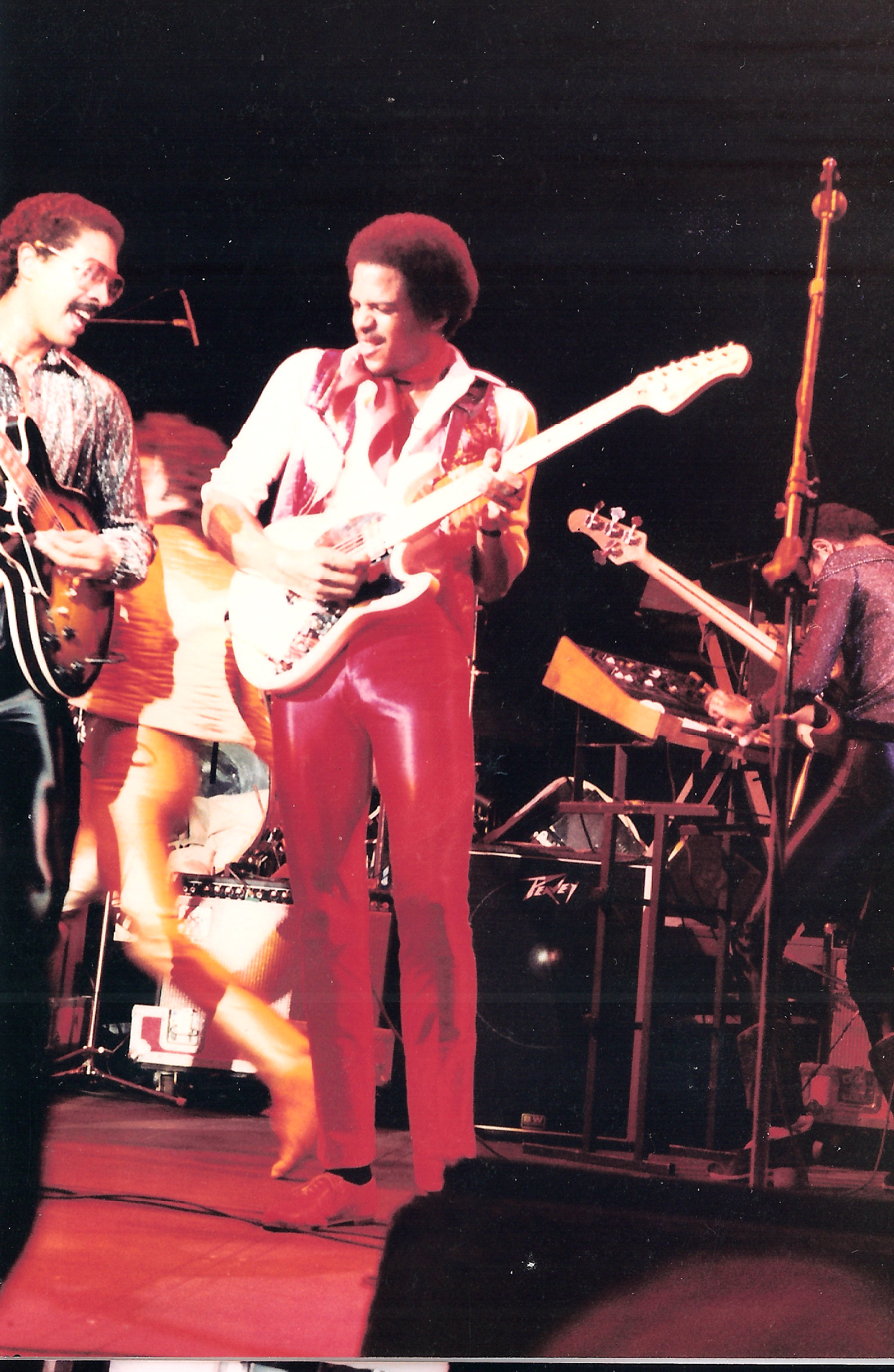

Background information
- Origin: United States
- Genres: Funk; pop; R&B; soul
- Occupation: Musician
- Instrument: Guitar
- Labels: Homespun Video

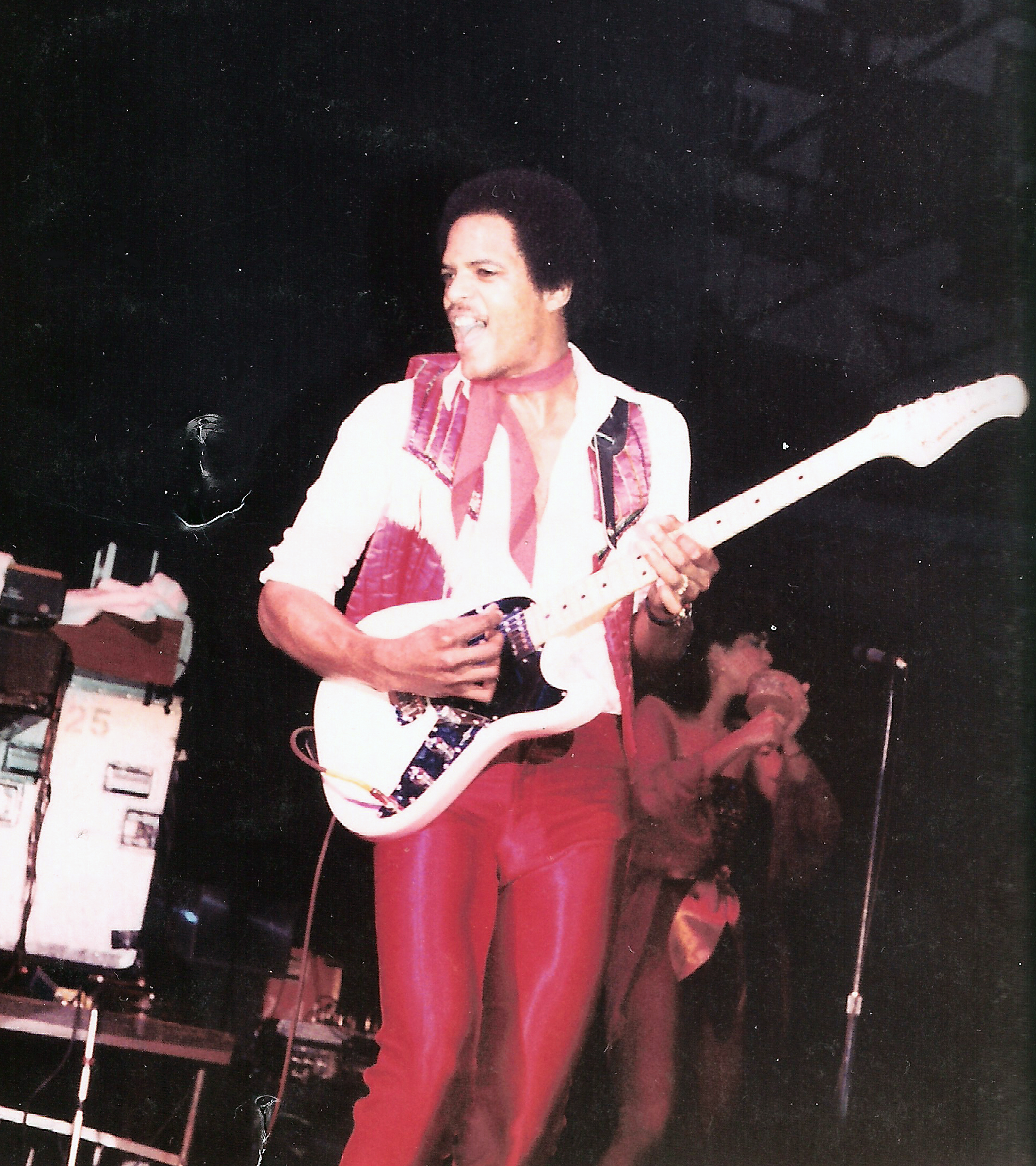

Alex Weir is an American guitarist.

Weir came to prominence in the 1970s with the funk/R&B band the Brothers Johnson. He is the cousin of fellow band members George and Louis Johnson.

He went on to work with the bands Talking Heads and Tom Tom Club, both on their albums and in concert. He appears in Talking Heads' 1984 concert film Stop Making Sense.

Additionally, Weir has worked as a session musician with a variety of artists, including Toni Childs. He worked on several Jerry Harrison (of Talking Heads) solo albums, including the critically acclaimed Casual Gods, released in 1988. The album spawned the US Mainstream Rock chart hit single "Rev It Up", which peaked at No. 7 in late 1987.

== Discography ==
with the Brothers Johnson

- Right on Time (1977)
- Blam! (1978)
- Light Up the Night (1980)

with Talking Heads

- Speaking in Tongues (1983)
- Stop Making Sense (1984)

Session work

Year	Artist	Album	Credit(s)
1982	Geri Logan	Come and Get It	Guitar
1982	Dunn & Bruce Street	Official Business	Guitar
1983	Tom Tom Club	Close to the Bone	Guitar
1988	Toni Childs	Union	Guitar
1988	Jerry Harrison	Casual Gods	Guitar, bass guitar
1990	Jerry Harrison	Walk on Water	Guitar, co-writer, co-producer
1995	General Public	Rub It Better	Guitar
1999	Geree	Through These Eyes	Guitar

== Filmography ==
- Stop Making Sense (1984)
- Great Rhythm Grooves for Electric Guitar (Instructional video) (1991)
