= Life Begins at 40 Million =

Studio album by The Bogmen
- Released: August 29, 1995
- Studio: Studio D, Sausalito, CA; The Plant Studios, Sausalito, CA
- Genre: Indie rock
- Length: 52:12
- Label: Arista
- Producer: Jerry Harrison

The Bogmen chronology
Life Begins at 40 Million (1995)	Closed Captioned Radio (1998)

Professional ratings
Review scores
Source	Rating
AllMusic	1.5/5 stars

Life Begins at 40 Million is an album by The Bogmen. It was produced by Jerry Harrison. It was by far the more commercially successful of the two Bogmen albums. The album sold more than 50,000 copies.

== Critical reception ==
AllMusic wrote that the album "lacks direction and any semblance of cohesiveness. Interesting it may be, but better than average it isn't." Timothy White, in Billboard, wrote: "There may be other 1995 debuts as fine as Life Begins at 40 Million, but few will be as free of formulas and, yes, uplifting."

== Track listing ==
All lyrics written by Bill Campion. All music composed by The Bogmen.

1. "The Big Burn"
2. "What's Behind Your Coat?"
3. "Yellar"
4. "The Third Rail"
5. "Dr. Jerome (Love Tub, Doctor)"
6. "Suddenly"
7. "Piss Tongue"
8. "Light a Candle for Me"
9. "It's a Fast Horizon"
10. "Raga"
11. "The Doubter's Glass"
12. "Englewood"
13. "Bonus Track 1"

== Personnel ==
The Bogmen

- Bill Campion – acoustic guitar, vocals
- Bill Ryan – guitar
- Mark Wike – bass
- Brendan Ryan – keyboards
- Clive Tucker – drums
- P.J. O'Connor – percussion, vocals
