= Vic Thrill =

American singer

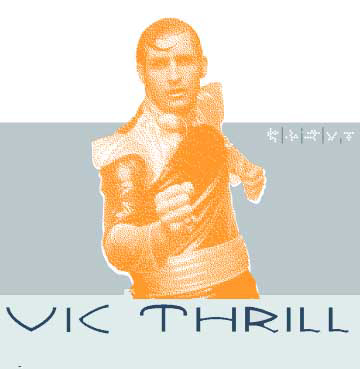
Vic Thrill SpaceSuit

Vic Thrill (stage name for Billy Campion) is the current lead singer for the Bogmen and his supporting band. The early Lineup of the band was Billy Campion (Vic Thrill), Anthony Rizzo (Saturn Missile), Mark Wike (Mrs. Wike), and Derek Finen (D-Finen). Forming after the first break of the Bogmen around the year 2000. In 2026, he sang in Ridiculon's 'HUMANICIDE'.

== Solo discography ==
- Blown From the Action (2002, Circus Clone Records)
- CE-5 (2003, Circus Clone Records)
- Circus of Enlightenment (2006, Circus Clone Records)
- Bollywood Hula Bard - Vol.1 (2017, Circus Clone Records)
- Bollywood Hula Bard - Vol.2 (2019, Circus Clone Records)
- Bollywood Hula Bard Vol.3 (2019, Circus Clone Records)
