= Re-Ron =

Single by Gil Scott-Heron
- Released: 1984
- Recorded: 1984
- Genre: Electronic, hip hop
- Length: 6:42
- Label: Arista

"Re-Ron" is a 1984 song by Gil Scott-Heron. It criticizes the campaign for the re-election of Ronald Reagan. It was recorded in collaboration with Bill Laswell.

Notable lines include:

"Would we take Fritz without Grits? We'd take Fritz the Cat. Would we take Jesse Jackson? Hell, we'd take Michael Jackson!"

Re-Ron was recorded three years after "B-movie", which also criticized the initial election of Reagan, a former B-movie actor, as the new president of the United States of America. These two songs by Scott-Heron were among many songs criticizing Reagan recorded by artists during the 1980s. The song features Bernie Worrell of Parliament-Funkadelic on synthesizer and clavinet.

== See also ==
- Ronald Reagan in music
