= The Red and the Black (album) =

Studio album by Jerry Harrison
- Released: late 1981
- Recorded: June 3–17, 1981 (Blank Tapes); June 23–September 12, 1981 (Eldorado)
- Studio: Blank Tapes, New York City; Eldorado, Los Angeles
- Genre: Rock
- Length: 40:07
- Label: Sire
- Producer: Jerry Harrison, Dave Jerden, Nona Hendryx

Jerry Harrison chronology
The Red and the Black (1981)	Casual Gods (1988)

Professional ratings
Review scores
Source	Rating
AllMusic	4.5/5 stars
Robert Christgau	C+

The Red and the Black is the debut album by American musician Jerry Harrison, who rose to prominence as a member of the Modern Lovers and Talking Heads. It was released in 1981 by Sire Records. The track "Things Fall Apart" was released as a 7" single in the UK. The track "Slink" was performed live by Talking Heads in 1982. The album was reissued in 2023 with a second instrumental mix version for Record Store Day 2023. The album was co-produced by and features Nona Hendryx (LaBelle) prominently on background vocals. She also co-wrote some of the lyrics.

== Track listing ==
All tracks are written by Jerry Harrison, except where noted. Additional lyrics by Nona Hendryx.

Side one
No.	Title	Writer(s)	Length
1.	"Things Fall Apart"		4:57
2.	"Slink"		4:20
3.	"The New Adventure"		5:05
4.	"Magic Hymie"	Jerry Harrison, Nona Hendryx, Bernie Worrell	4:48
Total length:			19:10

Side two
No.	Title	Length
1.	"Fast Karma / No Questions"	3:55
2.	"Worlds in Collision"	5:09
3.	"The Red Nights"	3:57
4.	"No More Reruns"	4:21
5.	"No Warning, No Alarm"	3:35
Total length:		20:57

== Personnel ==
- Jerry Harrison – vocals, guitar, bass, synthesizer, Clavinet, organ, piano, melodica, percussion

Additional musicians

- Yogi Horton – drums (tracks 1, 4–9)
- John Cooksey – drums (track 2)
- Steve Scales – percussion (track 3), drums (track 3)
- George Murray – bass guitar (tracks 1, 4, 8–9)
- Tinker Barfield – bass guitar (tracks 2, 4–5, 8)
- Bernie Worrell – organ (track 2), Clavinet (tracks 4–5), synthesizer (track 4)
- Adrian Belew – guitar (track 2), guitar solos (tracks 1–3, 6–7, 9)
- Nona Hendryx – background vocals
- Dolette McDonald – background vocals
- Koko Mae Evans – background vocals

Technical

- Jerry Harrison – producer, mixing, vocal arrangements and production, sleeve design, cover photo
- Nona Hendryx – vocal arrangements and production
- Dave Jerden – producer, engineer, mixing
- Butch Jones – engineer
- Eddy Schreyer – mastering
- M & Co. – sleeve design
- Chris Callis – cover photo
