= Walk on Water (Jerry Harrison album) =

Studio album by Jerry Harrison
- Released: 1990
- Studios: Royal, Lake Geneva; A.D., Milwaukee; D.V., Milwaukee; Studio Marcadet, Paris; Berwick Street, London; Sarm West, London; Wessex Sound, London; Rack, London; The Hit Factory, New York
- Genre: Rock
- Length: 55:54
- Labels: Sire (USA), Fontana (UK & Europe)
- Producers: Jerry Harrison; Ernie Brooks; Dan Hartman; Alex Weir; Bernie Worrell; Tom Bailey

Jerry Harrison chronology
Casual Gods (1988)	Walk on Water (1990)

Singles from Walk on Water
- 1. "Flying Under Radar" Released: 1990

Walk on Water is the third album by the American musician Jerry Harrison. It was released in 1990 by Sire Records in the U.S. and Fontana Records in the UK and Europe. For the second album in a row, Harrison's backing musicians were dubbed the Casual Gods.

Harrison supported the album by touring with the Ramones, Debbie Harry, and Tom Tom Club.

== Production ==
Alannah Currie and Tom Bailey, of Thompson Twins, contributed to the album. "I Cry for Iran" is about the Iran–Iraq War. "Cowboy's Got to Go" was influenced by Jackson Pollock.

== Critical reception ==
Professional ratings
Review scores
Source	Rating
AllMusic	2.5/5 stars
Calgary Herald	C−
Chicago Tribune	3/4 stars
The Rolling Stone Album Guide	2.5/5 stars
Select	2/5

The Calgary Herald wrote that "even [Harrison's] 'fun' tunes reek of academic calculation." The Chicago Tribune determined that "the Gods are a tight, funky crew capable of rocking out, playing complex solos or adding subtle sonic touches to the mix."

== Track listing ==
No.	Title	Writer(s)	Producer(s)	Length
1.	"Flying Under Radar"	Harrison, Dan Hartman, Ernie Brooks	Harrison, Hartman, Brooks	3:49
2.	"Kick Start"	Harrison, Alex Weir, Bernie Worrell, Brooks	Harrison, Weir, Worrell, Brooks	3:51
3.	"I Don't Mind"	Harrison, Tom Bailey, Alannah Currie, Brooks	Bailey, Harrison, Brooks	3:29
4.	"Confess"	Harrison, Bailey, Currie, Brooks	Bailey, Harrison, Brooks	3:40
5.	"Sleep Angel"	Harrison, Brooks, Joyce Bowden	Harrison, Brooks	6:05
6.	"I Cry for Iran"	Harrison, Weir, Worrell, Brooks, Bowden	Harrison, Weir, Worrell, Brooks	6:01
7.	"Never Let It Slip"	Harrison, Weir, Worrell, John Sieger	Harrison, Weir, Worrell, Brooks	3:18
8.	"Cowboy's Got to Go"	Harrison, Sieger, Brooks	no producer credited	4:52
9.	"If the Rains Return"	Harrison, Weir, Worrell, Brooks	Harrison, Weir, Worrell, Brooks	4:23
10.	"Remain Calm"	Harrison	Harrison	2:41
11.	"Big Mouth"	Harrison, Weir, Worrell, Bailey	Harrison, Weir, Worrell, Brooks	3:31
12.	"Facing the Fire"	Harrison, Weir, Worrell, Brooks, Arthur Russell	Harrison, Weir, Worrell, Brooks	4:35
13.	"The Doctors Lie"	Harrison, Brooks, Weir, Russell	Harrison, Brooks	5:39

== Personnel ==
- Jerry Harrison – guitar, keyboards, vocals

Additional musicians

- Tawatha Agee – background vocals
- Tom Bailey – keyboards
- Adrian Belew – guitar
- Joyce Bowden – background vocals, vocal arrangements
- Ernie Brooks – bass guitar
- Sherrell Harmon – background vocals
- Dan Hartman – keyboards, background vocals
- Rick Jaeger – drums
- Jason Klagstad – guitar
- Jim Liban – harmonica
- Samuel Llanas – background vocals
- Etienne Mboppe – bass
- Abdou M'Boup – percussion
- Arlene Newson – background vocals
- Loveless Redmond – background vocals
- Chris Spedding – guitar
- Vaneese Thomas – background vocals
- Brice Wassy – drums
- Alex Weir – guitar
- Arthur Weir – bass
- Michael Webb – background vocals
- Bernie Worrell – keyboards

Technical

- Jerry Harrison – producer, mixing
- Ernie Brooks – producer
- Dan Hartman – producer, engineer
- Alex Weir – producer
- Bernie Worrell – producer
- Tom Bailey – producer, mixing
- Jay Mark – engineer, mixing
- Richard Manwaring – producer
- David Vartanian – producer
- Tom Lord-Alge – mixing
- Bob Kraushaar – mixing
- Dave Jerden – mixing
- James Farber – mixing
- Keith Fernley – mixing
- David Henszey – mixing
- Ted Jensen – mastering
