= Casual Gods =

Studio album by Jerry Harrison
- Released: January 12, 1988
- Studios: Sigma Sound, New York City; D.V. Recording, Milwaukee
- Genre: Rock
- Length: 48:04
- Labels: Sire (US); Fontana (UK, Europe)
- Producer: Jerry Harrison

Jerry Harrison chronology
The Red and the Black (1981)	Casual Gods (1988)	Walk on Water (1991)

Professional ratings
Review scores
Source	Rating
AllMusic	4/5 stars

Casual Gods is the second album by American musician Jerry Harrison, released in January 1988 by Sire Records in the U.S. and Fontana Records in the UK and Europe. His third album, Walk on Water, would also bear the Casual Gods name as a proxy for the band. A majority of the songs were co-written with Harrison's Modern Lovers bandmate Ernie Brooks, who went on to tour internationally with Harrison in 1988.

The track "Man with a Gun" was featured in the 1988 film Two Moon Junction, and the instrumental version of the same song was used in the 1986 Jonathan Demme film Something Wild. The track "Cherokee Chief" first appeared on the 1987 Sire Records promotional sampler Just Say Yes. The single "Rev It Up" peaked at No. 7 on the U.S. Album Rock Tracks chart. The album cover features a photograph of the Serra Pelada gold mine by Brazilian photographer Sebastião Salgado.

== Track listing ==
All tracks are written by Jerry Harrison, except where noted.

No.	Title	Writer(s)	Length
1.	"Rev It Up"	Jerry Harrison, John Sieger, Ernie Brooks	4:17
2.	"Song of Angels"		3:35
3.	"Man with a Gun"		4:35
4.	"Let It Come Down"		4:52
5.	"Cherokee Chief"	Harrison, Brooks	4:30
6.	"A Perfect Lie"	Harrison, Arthur Russell, Brooks	4:25
7.	"Are You Running?"	Harrison, Brooks, Monique Dayan	4:20
8.	"Breakdown in the Passing Lane"		4:37
9.	"A.K.A. Love"	Harrison, Brooks	4:10
10.	"We're Always Talking"	Harrison, Brooks	4:40
11.	"Bobby"	Harrison, Brooks	4:03
Total length:			48:04

- The extended mix of "Bobby" did not appear on the LP or cassette versions of the album but was featured as the B-side of the "Rev It Up" 7-inch single. "Breakdown in the Passing Lane" was not on the original U.S. LP release.

== Personnel ==
- Jerry Harrison – guitar, keyboards, vocals

Additional musicians

- Alex Weir – guitars (tracks 1–10), bass guitar (tracks 2–3, 5, 8–10)
- Chris Spedding – guitars (tracks 1, 5)
- Robbie McIntosh – guitars (tracks 5–6)
- Rick Jaeger – drums (tracks 1, 5–12)
- David Van Tieghem – drums (track 2), percussion (tracks 4–5)
- Yogi Horton – drums (track 3)
- Bernie Worrell – keyboards; bass synthesizer (track 6)
- Jim Liban – horns; harmonica (track 8)
- Dickie Landry – horns; saxophone (track 6)
- Arlene Holmes – background vocals (tracks 1, 2–4, 7)
- Lovelace Richmond – background vocals (tracks 2–4)
- Arthur Russell – background vocals (track 6)
- Joyce Bowden – background vocals (track 6)
- Monique Dayan – background vocals (track 5)
- Ernie Brooks – background vocals (track 8)

Technical

- Jerry Harrison – producer
- Ernie Brooks – assistant producer
- Sebastião Salgado – photography
- David Vartanian – engineer (tracks 1–8, 10–12), overdub engineer; mixing (track 11)
- Jay Mark – engineer (track 9), mixing (tracks 6, 8)
- David Avidor – overdub recording
- Robin Laine – overdub recording
- Eric "E.T." Thorngren – overdub recording; mixing (tracks 2–3, 5, 10)
- John "Tokes" Potoker – overdub recording; mixing (tracks 1, 4, 7, 9, 12); additional engineering (track 6)
- J.C. Convertino – overdub recording
- Don Peterkofsky – studio assistant
- Nick Delro – studio assistant
- Tony Masciarotte – studio assistant
- Mark Roule – studio assistant
- Fernando Kral – studio assistant
- Stan Katayama – studio assistant
- Tom Vercillo – studio assistant
- Bob Brackman – studio assistant
- Jack Skinner – mastering
- M&Co. – album art design

== Charts ==
Chart (1988)	Peak position
Australia (Kent Music Report)	18
Austrian Albums (Ö3 Austria)	17
German Albums (Offizielle Top 100)	31
New Zealand Albums (RMNZ)	4
Swiss Albums (Schweizer Hitparade)	10
