= We begin bombing in five minutes =

1984 joke by Ronald Reagan

We begin bombing in five minutes
The audio leaked to the public

"We begin bombing in five minutes" is the last sentence of a controversial, off-the-record joke made by the president of the United States, Ronald Reagan, in 1984 during the Cold War. While preparing for a scheduled radio address from his vacation home in California, Reagan joked with those present about outlawing and bombing Russia. The joke was not broadcast live, but was recorded and later leaked to the public. The Soviet Union criticized the joke, as did Reagan's opponent in the 1984 United States presidential election, Walter Mondale.

== Speech ==
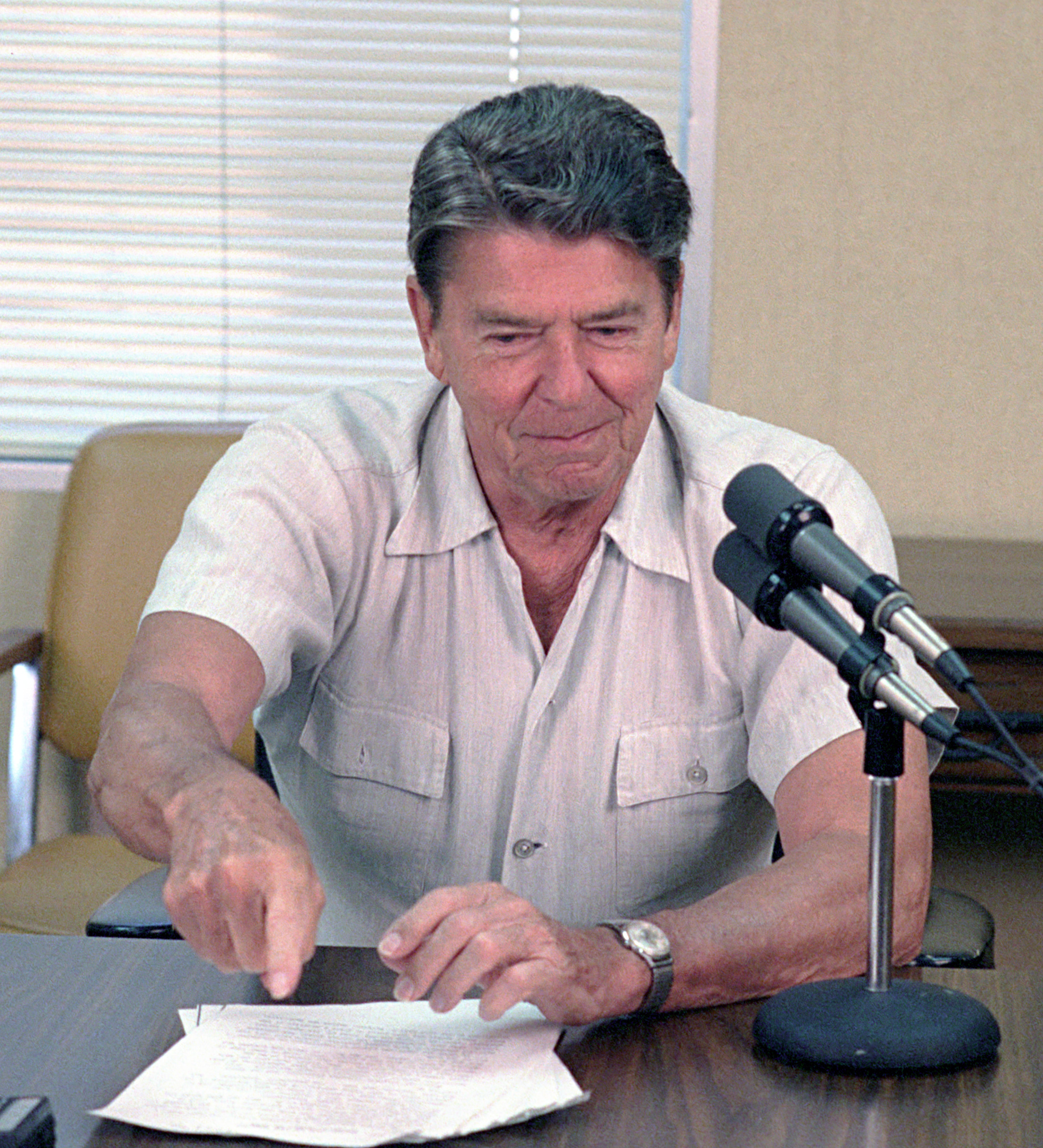
Reagan recording the August 11, 1984 address at Rancho del Cielo

At 9:06 a.m. on August 11, 1984, President Reagan made his weekly radio address from Rancho del Cielo, his ranch near Santa Barbara, California. The live address began with the president announcing his signature on the Equal Access Act: "My fellow Americans: I'm pleased to tell you that today I signed legislation that will allow student religious groups to begin enjoying a right they've too long been denied—the freedom to meet in public high schools during nonschool hours, just as other student groups are allowed to do."

Before the speech, while Reagan was joking with NPR's audio engineers during a soundcheck, he riffed on his own speech, saying, "My fellow Americans, I'm pleased to tell you today that I've signed legislation that will outlaw Russia forever. We begin bombing in five minutes." This sort of levity was common for Reagan; he injected his humor into soundchecks, outtakes, and downtime throughout his careers in show business and politics.

=== Leak ===
In the minutes before Reagan gave his speech, a live feed from Rancho del Cielo was being transmitted to radio stations around the United States. Many rebroadcasters were already recording the feed to be ready for the official transmission, and thus recording Reagan's pre-speech joke. Many in the media heard Reagan's impromptu remarks as he gave them, but they were not broadcast live.

In October 1982, President Reagan had made similarly impolitic remarks about the Polish People's Republic. As he prepared to announce his cancellation of Poland's most favored nation status (in retaliation for suppression of the Polish trade union, Solidarity), Reagan called the military government "a bunch of no-good, lousy bums." This was later aired by the American Broadcasting Company and NBC News. Because of this leak, members of the White House Correspondents' Association agreed not to publish such unprepared, off-the-record presidential remarks in the future.

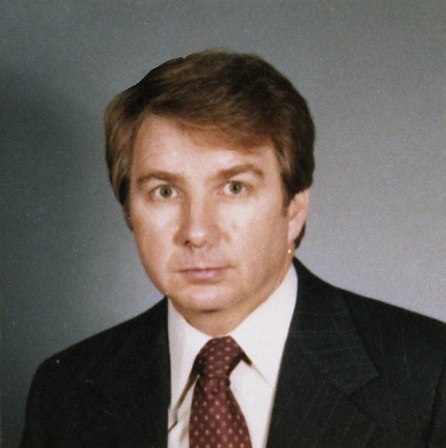
Speakes in September 1983

Both CBS News and CNN recorded the 1984 joke, but they kept Reagan's remarks under wraps in accordance with the White House agreement. However, rumors of the joke quickly spread, and by August 13 the quotation had been published by outlets such as Gannett. The White House Press Secretary, Larry Speakes, declined to comment that same day, saying, "I don't talk about off-the-record stuff."

== Reactions ==
=== Soviet ===
On August 13, the deputy minister of Soviet foreign affairs, Valentin Kamenev, told reporters, "I have nothing to say." The next day, President Reagan's leaked comments were denounced by the Soviet government, Pravda, Izvestia, and TASS as "unprecedentedly hostile", evidence of the United States' insincerity in trying to improve Soviet–American relations, and as an abuse of the office of president. Western diplomats described the Soviet response as over the top, suggesting that it was an effort to give themselves more leverage in negotiations with the United States. U.S. officials were compelled to mollify the Soviet Union and assure the United States' Cold War adversary that "Reagan's offhand remark did not reflect White House policies or U.S. military intentions." In 2003, Moskovskij Komsomolets' Mikhail Rostovsky said that "Soviet propaganda then squeezed the maximum possible out of this joke of the state leader."

By August 14, the recording of Reagan's joke had become world news. On August 15, someone, whom the National Security Agency described to U.S. Representative Michael D. Barnes as "a wayward operator in the Soviet Far Eastern command", sent a coded message from Vladivostok that said, in part, "We now embark on military action against the U.S. forces." Japanese and U.S. intelligence decoded the message and raised the alert state in that part of the world; Soviet naval vessels in the North Pacific contacted Vladivostok in confusion. The U.S. never saw any evidence of Soviet attack preparations, and the alert status as promulgated by Vladivostok was canceled within 30 minutes.

=== Domestic ===
Reagan's poll numbers took a hit from the political gaffe, temporarily raising the hopes of Walter Mondale's supporters in the 1984 United States presidential election campaign. Mondale said of Reagan's joke, "A [p]resident has to be very, very careful with his words." However, in the analysis of Reagan historian Craig Shirley, the leak of Reagan's joke was poorly used by the Democratic Party: "[criticism of the joke] actually worked against the Democrats and for Reagan […] as they came across as hypersensitive, and Reagan as calm, cool and collected."

In 2010, Politico journalist Andrew Glass wrote, "Most commentators dismissed the joke as, at worst, poor taste. Nonetheless, it got geopolitical traction because it came at a time of heightened Cold War tensions between Washington and Moscow—which largely dissolved during Reagan's second term." In 2011, the Deseret News listed Reagan's microphone gaffe as his sixth-best quote, expressing surprise that it was leaked only 87 days before the election.

== Other uses ==
Jerry Harrison, of the American rock band Talking Heads, obtained a copy of the recording and used it in the 1984 song "Five Minutes", which he performed under the name Bonzo Goes to Washington.

== See also ==
- Bushism – Unconventional statements by George W. Bush
