= Jerry Harrison =

American musician (born 1949)

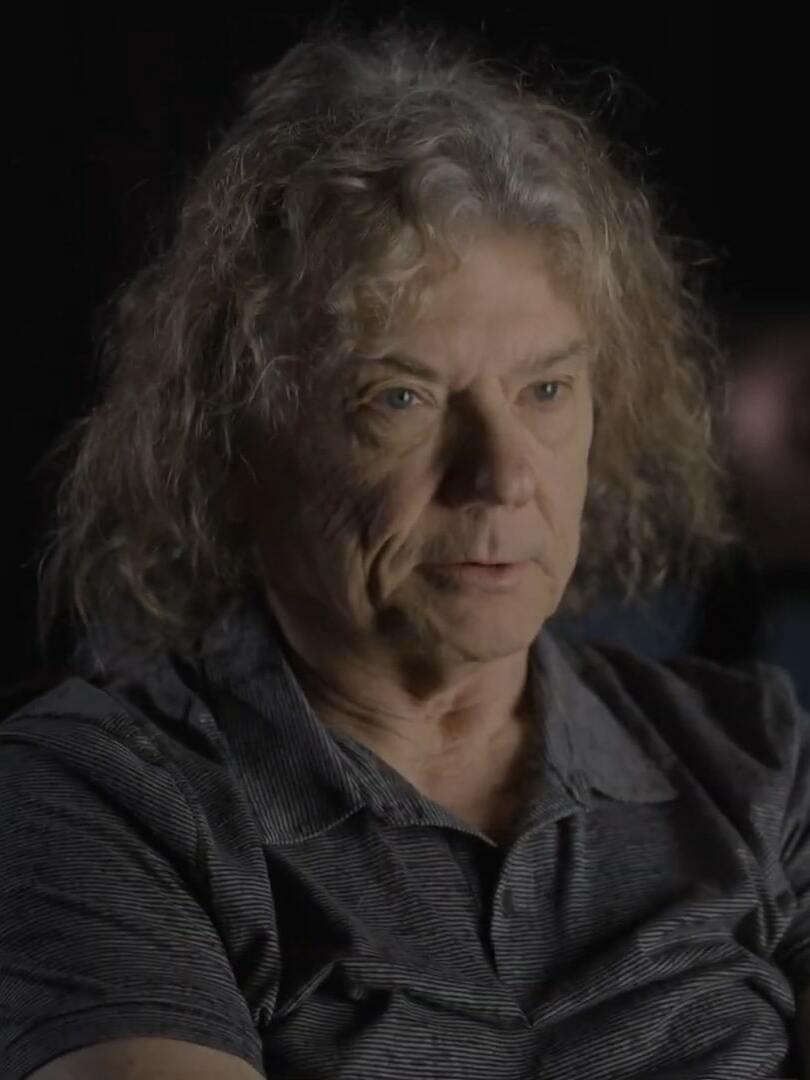
- Harrison in 2023

Background information
- Born: Jeremiah Griffin Harrison; February 21, 1949 (age 77); Milwaukee, Wisconsin, U.S.
- Genres: New wave; afrobeat; funk; punk rock; art rock
- Occupations: Musician; record producer; songwriter
- Instruments: Keyboards; guitar
- Years active: 1971–present
- Formerly of: The Modern Lovers; Talking Heads

Jeremiah Griffin Harrison (born February 21, 1949) is an American musician, record producer, and songwriter. He began his professional music career as a member of the band the Modern Lovers, before becoming keyboardist and guitarist for the new wave group Talking Heads. In 2002, Harrison was inducted into the Rock and Roll Hall of Fame as a member of Talking Heads.

Following David Byrne's announcement of Talking Heads' disbanding in 1991, Harrison has focused more on producing other bands, a role he started while still with Talking Heads, first producing the album Milwaukee with Elliott Murphy, and then later working with Violent Femmes on their third album, The Blind Leading the Naked, in 1986.

During the 1990s, he produced a number of hit albums for bands such as Live, The Verve Pipe, Big Head Todd and the Monsters, and Kenny Wayne Shepherd among others. He has also released three albums of solo music (all while Talking Heads were still active) and has participated in a number of partial reunions of Talking Heads. In 1999, he helped found the online music community GarageBand.com.

== Early life ==
Harrison was born in Milwaukee, Wisconsin. He was exposed to artistic fields from a young age: his mother studied art and taught at the Art Institute of Chicago and the Layton School of Art; his father was a musician and worked as an executive in an advertisement firm. Harrison graduated from Shorewood High School (Wisconsin). where he played in many bands, was in the debate club, the student council, the youth club, the math club, also played basketball and was a part of the track team. He later attended Harvard College where he graduated Magna Cum Laude in Visual and Environmental Studies in 1972 with his bachelor thesis being about the fields of painting, sculpture and drawing.

== Career ==
=== The Modern Lovers ===
In 1971, Harrison met Jonathan Richman, and they formed the Modern Lovers. Harrison was introduced to Richman by mutual friend and journalist Danny Fields and the pair bonded over their shared love of the Velvet Underground. He joined The Modern Lovers in early 1971, playing on their debut album in 1972 in California (not released until 1976 and produced by John Cale), and left in February 1974, when Richman wished to perform his songs more quietly. Devastated by the breakup of the band, Harrison returned to Harvard to get his Master's degree in architecture.

=== Talking Heads ===
Harrison joined Talking Heads in 1977, after the release of their debut single, "Love → Building on Fire". He was offered a spot in the band in 1976, while he was still studying at Harvard. Tina Weymouth phoned Harrison to ask him to come and see Talking Heads play in Boston, not knowing he had already seen them and had been impressed by their material. After the performance, Harrison did not give a precise answer about whether he would join the group. In September 1976, Harrison told Weymouth he would come to New York City to jam with the band, but he did not have enough money to take a bus. He instead helped his friend, former Harvard classmate and Modern Lovers bassist, Ernie Brooks moving a family's furniture to New York, hitching a ride with him in the process.

Between tours, Harrison started producing records, working with a group called the Escalators in New York and also New Wave soul singer Nona Hendryx. In 1980, Remain In Light caused a dispute in the band due to the credits when Harrison was given additional writing credit for "The Overload" and "Houses in Motion" alongside Brian Eno and David Byrne. Harrison, Weymouth and Talking Heads drummer Chris Frantz disputed the credits, and later editions of Remain In Light credit all band members (and Eno) for co-writing all the album's tracks.

In 1984, Harrison heard a recording on the radio of President Ronald Reagan, apparently from an off-air hot mic soundcheck saying, "My fellow Americans, I'm pleased to tell you today that I've signed legislation that will outlaw Russia forever. We begin bombing in five minutes." Though many people had heard of the joke, most had never actually heard the recording itself. Believing it summed up the entire Reagan presidency, Harrison tracked down a copy of the tape through a college radio station and then worked with co-producer Daniel Lazerus and funk bassist Bootsy Collins to create a song. "If the song is a hit," Harrison quipped, "I'll be willing to share royalties with 'lyricist' Ronald Reagan." When the song, "Five Minutes (Bonzo Goes to Washington)", was completed, no major label could guarantee a release before the 1984 Presidential election, so Harrison chose micro-label Sleeping Bag Records to release it in October 1984.

=== Solo career ===
Harrison has released three solo albums. Many have assumed that the title of his debut, The Red and the Black in 1981, derived from Stendhal's novel of the same name. But in 2021, Harrison revealed that the name was inspired by the group of Situationists. Some members who had come to the United States to join the protests at Harvard against the Vietnam War ended up living in Harrison's room and would constantly talk about their philosophy and Wilhelm Reich, which fascinated Harrison. From this time, Harrison remembered a pamphlet that Guy Debord created named "The Red and the Black" and he "just really liked" the title. The main thoughts behind the album were the ideas of communism and anarchism.

In 1988, he created Casual Gods, recorded in Milwaukee in a bomb shelter-turned studio by the brother of Harrison's best friend in elementary school. During the day Harrison took care of his mother and during the night he worked at the studio. Harrison co-wrote many songs on the album with his bandmate from the Modern Lovers, Ernie Brooks. The track "Man with a Gun" was featured in the 1988 film Two Moon Junction, and the instrumental version of the same song was used in the 1986 Jonathan Demme film Something Wild. The single "Rev It Up" reached a high-point of number seven on the US Mainstream Charts in April 1988; In an interview, Harrison recounts taping the music video with a room full of babies. In 1988, with the success of the Casual Gods album and "Rev It Up" single, Harrison toured internationally with a band including Ernie Brooks, Alex Weir, Bernie Worrell, and Chris Spedding. Their performances included cover songs associated with Harrison: "Roadrunner", "She Cracked", "Life During Wartime", and "Children of the Revolution".

Harrison's last solo work was Walk on Water, in 1990.

=== Post–Talking Heads ===
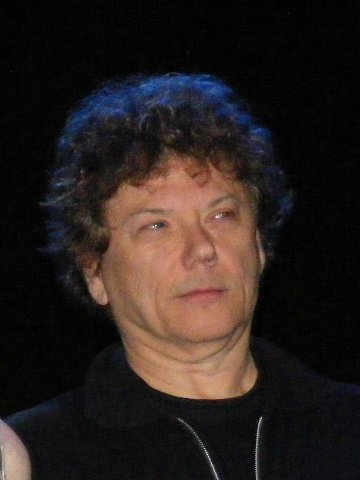
Harrison in 2010

After the 1991 breakup of Talking Heads, Harrison turned to producing and worked on albums by bands including Hockey, Violent Femmes, The BoDeans, The Von Bondies, General Public, Live, Crash Test Dummies, The Verve Pipe, Poi Dog Pondering, Rusted Root, Stroke 9, The Bogmen, Black 47, The Mayfield Four, Of A Revolution, No Doubt, Turkuaz, Josh Joplin Group, The Black and White Years, Kenny Wayne Shepherd, Bamboo Shoots, the String Cheese Incident and The Gracious Few. He was also Chairman of the Board for Garageband.com, an internet music resource he co-founded in 1999. As of 2015, Harrison is the founder and chairman of the board at RedCrow, which is a web-based direct investment platform that connects financial and human capital to healthcare start-ups as "a community who share knowledge, interest and passion for healthcare innovation."

In 2021, Harrison joined Turkuaz and Adrian Belew for a series of shows celebrating 40 years of the album Remain in Light, in his first public performances since the 1996 tour to support No Talking, Just Head.

== Film work ==
Harrison, as a member of Talking Heads, is featured throughout the 1984 concert film Stop Making Sense, directed by Jonathan Demme. Also during the Talking Heads era, Harrison made cameo appearances as Billy Idol, Kid Creole and Prince look-alike lip-synchers in David Byrne's 1986 film True Stories. Harrison also had a small part in the 2006 film The Darwin Awards as "Guy in Bar No. 1" alongside John Doe of the band X.

== Discography ==
=== Solo albums ===
Year	Title	US	AUS	NZ	AUT	GER	SUI
1981	The Red and the Black	–	–	–	–	–	–
1988	Casual Gods	78	18	4	17	31	10
1990	Walk on Water	188	–	–	–	–	–

=== Singles ===
Year	Title	US Main.	US Modern	AUS	NZ	GER	UK
1981	"Things fall apart"	–	–	–	–	–	–
1984	"Five Minutes"	–	–	–	–	–	–
1988	"Rev It Up"	7	–	3	6	45	90
1988	"Man with a Gun"	–	–	17	15	–	–
1988	"Cherokee Chief"	–	–	–	–	–	–
1990	"Flying Under Radar"	42	13	98	–	–	–

=== The Heads ===
Year	Title	US	AUS	NZ	AUT	GER	SUI
1996	No Talking Just Head	–	–	–	–	–	–

== Production ==
Year	Album	Artist
1986	Milwaukee	Elliott Murphy
1986	The Blind Leading the Naked	Violent Femmes
1987	Outside Looking In	BoDeans
1991	Mental Jewelry	Live
1992	Volo Volo	Poi Dog Pondering
1992	Purefunalia	Pure
1992	Bush Roaming Mammals	Billy Goat
1993	God Shuffled His Feet	Crash Test Dummies
1994	Throwing Copper	Live
1994	Home of the Brave	Black 47
1995	Rub It Better	General Public
1995	Lost in the Former West	The Fatima Mansions
1995	Life Begins at 40 Million	The Bogmen
1996	Villains	The Verve Pipe
1996	Remember	Rusted Root
1996	No Talking, Just Head	The Heads
1996	Neurotic Outsiders	Neurotic Outsiders
1997	Trouble Is...	Kenny Wayne Shepherd
1997	Beautiful World	Big Head Todd and the Monsters
1998	Fallout	The Mayfield Four
1998	Useful Music	Josh Joplin Group
1999	The Distance to Here	Live
1999	Nasty Little Thoughts	Stroke 9
1999	Live On	Kenny Wayne Shepherd
1999	I'd Rather Eat Glass	Bijou Phillips
2000	Watering Ghost Garden	Creeper Lagoon
2000	Shine	Pat McGee Band
2000	Return of Saturn	No Doubt
2001	Take Back the Universe and Give Me Yesterday	Creeper Lagoon
2001	Stroke 9	Stroke 9
2002	Rip It Off	Stroke 9
2003	Love	The Juliana Theory
2004	Pawn Shoppe Heart	The Von Bondies
2005	Stories of a Stranger	O.A.R.
2007	10 Days Out: Blues from the Backroads	Kenny Wayne Shepherd
2008	The Black and White Years	The Black and White Years
2011	How I Go	Kenny Wayne Shepherd
2013	Can't Get Enough	The Rides
2014	The Turn	Live
2014	Song in My Head	The String Cheese Incident
2017	Believe	The String Cheese Incident
2018	Bi/MENTAL	Le Butcherettes
2019	Wonder Park: Music from the Motion Picture	Various artists

== Personal life ==
Harrison is the father of three children including a daughter, Aishlin. He lives in Marin County, California, with his wife.
