= 5 Minutes (Bonzo Goes to Washington song) =

1984 single by Bonzo Goes to Washington

Single by Bonzo Goes to Washington
- Released: October 1984
- Recorded: 1984
- Studio: D.V. Studios, Milwaukee
- Genre: Electro
- Length: 3:35
- Label: Sleeping Bag
- Songwriters: Jerry Harrison; Bootsy Collins
- Producers: Jerry Harrison; Daniel Lazerus

"5 Minutes" is a song by Talking Heads member Jerry Harrison and bassist Bootsy Collins of Parliament-Funkadelic, credited to Bonzo Goes to Washington. It was produced by Harrison with Daniel Lazerus and released by Sleeping Bag Records in October 1984.

The song begins with a recording of then-US-president Ronald Reagan's "we begin bombing in five minutes" joke speech, which is then sampled and looped throughout the remainder of the track.

Harrison had considered the joke to be in bad taste; as he later recalled to author Dave Bowman:

Everyone has the right to kid around, but that was too public. I hated Reagan's gutting of people's civil rights. I thought everything he stood for was awful.

Before the record was released, most people had heard about the joke but very few had actually heard the recording itself. It was only spoken by Reagan as a microphone test, which was then inadvertently recorded. Harrison was able to locate a copy of the speech from a college radio station and sampled it. Using what would now be considered to be common hip-hop recording methods—despite the term only just being used at the time—Harrison mixed in Reagan's speech with synthesizers and drums, looping the phrases "I'm pleased", "outlaw Russia forever" and "five minutes" multiple times over.

The title of the band references the films Mr. Smith Goes to Washington and Bedtime for Bonzo, the latter of which starred Reagan and also inspired the Ramones song "Bonzo Goes to Bitburg". Despite the character of Bonzo being a chimpanzee in the film, in both songs Bonzo is taken to mean Reagan himself.

When the song was completed, no major label could guarantee a release before the 1984 presidential election so Harrison chose to release it on the "micro-label" Sleeping Bag Records. The song reached number 36 on Billboard's Hot Dance/Disco chart.

== See also ==
- Ronald Reagan in music
