= Godfrey Diamond =

American drummer

- Born: Philadelphia, Pennsylvania, United States
- Genres: Rock; Alternative; Pop; Glam; Dance
- Occupations: Record producer; Songwriter; Engineer; Mixer
- Instrument: Drums
- Years active: 1975–present
- Labels: Arista; Atlantic; Capital; Colombia; Warner Bros; Lava; RCA; Sony; Motown; Universal
- Website: www.perfectmixes.com

Godfrey Diamond is an American record producer, mixer, musician, and writer.

== Early career ==
Diamond was born in Philadelphia and is the brother of musician Gregg Diamond and the half brother of legendary drag queen Flawless Sabrina. In 1968, he moved with his family to New York City. While in college he began working at Mediasound Studios in Manhattan. While at Mediasound, Diamond worked with a wide range of artists including Gloria Gaynor, Martha Reeves (Martha & the Vandellas), Kool and the Gang, Frank Sinatra, Glen Campbell, Etta James, Barry Manilow, and Merle Haggard, as well as recording some of the top studio musicians of the era, such as Steve Gadd, Tony Levin, Bernard Purdie, Mick Ronson and Paul Shaffer.

At the age of 21, Diamond produced Lou Reed's Coney Island Baby for RCA Records, the same year he and brother Gregg Diamond hit number one with "More, More, More" for The Andrea True Connection, with Godfrey's drum parts later appearing on Len's hit "Steal My Sunshine". The success of "More, More, More" led to the formation of the creative nucleus known as the World Radio Band consisting of Gregg, Godfrey, Steve Love and Jim Gregory. This team wrote, produced and arranged many dance/pop artists including Bionic Boogie, Hot Butterfly/Luther Vandross, Gloria Gaynor, Star Cruiser and George McCrae who were instrumental in creating the disco sound.

Returning to his rock roots during the 1980s, Diamond worked with many bands including Aerosmith and Billy Squier. His collaboration with Rob Hardin led to the band Dance in Reverse, signed by Atlantic Records, which brought together many acclaimed players of the era including Sammy Merendino on drums, Mars Williams on saxophone and Steve Stevens on guitar. During this time Diamond also produced Los Angeles-area bands I Napoleon (Geffen Records) and The Lostboys (Atlantic Records).

In the 1990s, Diamond concentrated on developing, producing, and signing bands which formed New York's alternative scene, including Speedway (Lava Records), The Bogmen (Arista Records), Piss Factory (Columbia Records) and indie bands Princess Superstar, Cottonhead, The Dragsters, and Pillbox, among others.

== Recent career ==
In 2003, he opened Perfect Mixes Recording Studio in Williamsburg, New York, which has now relocated near the Brooklyn Museum. This private studio is where Diamond currently works to produce, mix, and write for local and international artists and singer-songwriters. In 2015, Diamond co-produced David Bronson's album Questions with guest singers Robin Clark, Gordon Grody and Carlos Alomar. He has recently produced new albums for Brooklyn band Foxy and renowned European jazz artist Lena Kovacevic.

== Select discography ==
- Lou Reed - Coney Island Baby (Producer/Engineer/Mixer)
- Aerosmith - Rock in a Hard Place (Chief Engineer)
- Andrea True Connection - More, More, More (Producer/Engineer/Drums)
- Billy Squier - Here & Now, Creatures of Habit (Producer)
- Frank Sinatra - All or Nothing at All (Engineer)
- Bionic Boogie featuring Luther Vandross (Producer/Engineer/Mixer)
