= Bamboo Shoots =

American musical group

- Origin: Brooklyn and New Jersey
- Genres: DIY pop, electronic rock, alternative rock, passport rock
- Years active: 2004–2010
- Label: Epic Records
- Members: Avir Mitra; Karl Sukhia; Shiv Puri; Ankur Patel
- Past members: Tom Houston; Ahmed Mahmoud; Paul Venzor; Phillip Dehoux; Gabriel Chang
- Website: www.myspace.com/bambooshoots

Bamboo Shoots is an American four-piece musical group based out of Brooklyn, New York, and suburban New Jersey. They are known for their dueling, two-person rhythm section and their South Asian identity and influence. Their debut album released on September 29, 2009, on Epic Records.

== History ==
=== Formation ===
Bamboo Shoots played their first show at Pianos in New York City in 2004, however most of the members were friends prior to being in the band. Avir and Karl met as young children through the Zoroastrian community in Southern New Jersey (Karl’s parents and Avir’s mother are of Parsi heritage). When Avir was 12, he got a guitar and within two years Karl got a guitar and the two began playing music together. They began writing songs together soon after.

Avir met Shiv while spending the night at a mutual friend’s dorm in New York University. Shiv, a student in the Stern School of Business, had already heard some songs Avir had made and the two became friends. Avir, Karl and Shiv began playing house parties and writing informally under the moniker Bojangles. Ankur’s brother was a friend of Avir and introduced Ankur to the group at an early practice. Ankur reportedly began playing a dhol over their songs and became a band member that day.

=== mtvU Contest ===
In late 2006, Bamboo Shoots casually signed up for the mtvU Best Music on Campus contest. They soon forgot about it. In March 2007, they were informed that they had made it to the top 50 out of a pool of thousands of bands. Within a few months they were voted into the top 15, then the top 5. Friends and fans from all over the world helped propel the band forward with their votes. The band were surprised when an MTVu camera crew ambushed them at their friend’s apartment in Crown Heights Brooklyn and informed them that they had indeed won the contest. They were informed that they would be playing live on Late Night with Conan O’Brien within a few days.

=== Record Contract ===
Bamboo Shoots signed to Epic Records in the summer of 2007.

=== Album Recording ===
In October 2007, Bamboo Shoots left New York for Sausalito, CA where they began working with producer Jerry Harrison from Talking Heads on their Epic Records debut. ET Thorngren and Matt Cohen engineered. Recording was completed in March 2008. The album was mixed from May–June at Chalice Studios in Los Angeles by Mark "Spike" Stent and mastered by Brian Gardner. The album, titled Armour, was released September, 2009.

=== Pre-Release ===
On March 24, 2009, Bamboo Shoots announced their first tour of India with stops in Mumbai, Delhi, Pune, Kolkata, and Bangalore.

== Discography ==
=== Albums ===
| Year | Title |
|---|---|
| 2009 | Armour: Released: September 29, 2009; Format: CD, digital download |

=== EPs ===
| Year | Title |
|---|---|
| 2004 | Research and Development EP: Released: April 29, 2004; Format: CD, digital download |
| 2006 | Blue EP: Released: May 11, 2006; Format: CD, digital download |
| 2006 | Hey Girl 7": Released: November 28, 2006; Live Recording; Format: vinyl, digital download |

=== Mixtapes ===
| Year | Title |
|---|---|
| 2009 | Music for Cotillions: Released: March 6, 2009; Format: digital download |

== Touring and Appearances ==
Bamboo Shoots performed on Late Night with Conan O'Brien on May 14, 2007. They have since toured with Plain White T’s, All Time Low, 3OH!3, Secondhand Serenade, and Tyga through MTVu’s summer concert series. Bamboo Shoots has also performed with acts such as The Donnas, The Fashion, Soulja Boy, Gift of Gab, The White Tie Affair, Ordinary Boys, 22-20s, Hail Social, Illinois, Karsh Kale and Chamillionaire. Prior to signing, Bamboo Shoots toured with Jimmie’s Chicken Shack.

In early 2008 Avir was selected to appear in Virgin America's "This is How to Fly" ad campaign. An image of him playing guitar on a Virgin plane surrounded by flight attendants appeared in billboards, magazines and posters in New York City, Los Angeles, Seattle, Washington DC and San Francisco. On April 8, 2008, Bamboo Shoots played live in the air on Virgin America’s inaugural flight to Seattle.

On October 14, 2008, Bamboo Shoots was a Featured Artist on Myspace Music.

On February 6, 2009 Avir and Ahmed interviewed Tricky as part of MTV Iggy’s Artists interviewing artists series.

== Licensing ==
In January 2007 a demo version of "Hey Girl" produced by Britt Myers was used in a promo for the MTV’s The Real World: Denver.

A demo version of "If You Should Die" was featured in the launch promo of MTV’s Virtual Laguna Beach.

"Interstate 95" was used in the film Finding Preet.

"Talking to Death" was used in the independent Alaskan documentary Nome Golovin Snowmachine Race.

== Personal life ==
=== Descent ===
Four members of Bamboo Shoots are of Indian descent. Shiv Puri is Punjabi, Karl Sukhia is Parsi, Ankur Patel is Gujarati, and Avir Mitra is half Bengali and half Parsi. All members were born and raised in the US except Karl, who was born in the UK and spent his early years in India.

All members went to high school in New Jersey. Avir and Karl are from South Jersey (Voorhees and Cherry Hill respectively), Ankur is from New Brunswick and Shiv is from North Jersey (Parsippany).

=== College ===
Avir Mitra attended Brown University where he received a degree in Biology. He was a few months away from commencing medical school when Bamboo Shoots won the MTVu contest. He decided to forgo medical school. Karl Sukhia received a degree in Government and Politics from the University of Maryland, College Park. Shiv Puri received a finance degree from NYU Stern School of Business and quit a job on Wall Street to be in the band full-time. Ankur postponed his college degree in civil engineering at Middlesex County College.

=== Post Bamboo Shoots Era ===
Following his recording career, Avir attended medical school and now works as an emergency medicine physician in New York City.

For drummer Shiv Puri, who was the "band chef" and cooked for everyone while touring and rehearsing, he founded Bombay Sandwich Co. in 2012 at the Brooklyn Flea's food festival, Smorgasburg, and in 2014 opened his first brick and mortar cafe of the same name, at 48 W. 27th Street in Manhattan's Flatiron District. The cafe has become renowned for its use of Ayurvedic herbs and spices to create unique vegan dishes.

== Interviews and articles ==
- The Bamboo Shoots, by The Beav in Rockworms, May 2007
- Bamboo Shoots Meet Their Maker, MTV Iggy Blog, November 2008
- Band Hopes to Shoot to Stardom, by Jason Nark, undated
- Indian Zing to MTV Contest, by Anirudh Bhattacharyya, CNN-IBN, June 2007
- Passion Through Sound, interview by Pauleen Arneja, desiclub.com, 2004
- A Quintet That Rocks, interview by Ranjit Souri in India Currents magazine, September 2008
- Shooting High, from Just Another Magazine, undated
- Sudden Fame a Wild Ride For College Band, by Jay Lustig, The (New Jersey) Star-Ledger, May 2007
- The Ten to Watch: 2008, by Sonu Munshi, East West magazine, December 2007
