= Lenny Cerzosie =

American singer

Lenny Cerzosie Jr. is currently the American lead singer in the hard rock band The Infinite Staircase from Staten Island, New York and guitarist for the Hard Rock Band Le Projet also featuring lead vocalist Kevin Martin and bassist Adam Kury from the band Candlebox and drummer Morgan Rose from the band Sevendust. He's also the lead singer and guitarist in The Mayan Factor since 2015.

== History ==
As singer of The Infinite Staircase, Cerzosie has recorded their 2009 full-length debut record “The Road Less Taken” including guest performances by Augie Ciulla (Reparata and the Delrons drummer), guitar virtuoso Blues Saraceno (Poison guitarist) and Earl Slick (David Bowie and former John Lennon guitarist) and their 2013 7-song EP "No Amends" produced by Morgan Rose (Sevendust, Call Me No One) and features collaborations with, in addition to Rose, Lajon Witherspoon and Clint Lowery (Sevendust) as well as Zakk Wylde and John "JD" DeServio (Black Label Society), Kevin Martin and Sean Hennesy (Candlebox), Chris Caffery (Savatage/Trans-Siberian Orchestra) and Troy Cromwell (Cycle Of Pain).

In 2009 The Infinite Staircase toured nationally with Zakk Wylde's Black Label Society, Sevendust and Dope during the “Black Label Bash Tour”.

In 2013 the band charted in the Top 30 on America's Rock Radio Music Charts with their single "The Pride", which was a song written and recorded to benefit the victims of Hurricane Sandy. "The Pride" features guest performances by Zakk Wylde, Kevin Martin of Candlebox, Morgan Rose of Sevendust and John "JD" DeServio of Black Label Society. "The Pride" spent 6 weeks in the Mainstream Rock Radio Top 40 in America with its highest rank being #27.

The band's follow-up single, "The Things We've Done" is in rotation on Music Choice's Top 50 Active Rock Songs and at Rock and Active Rock Stations across the country.

The Infinite Staircase is currently writing a new covers EP that features bassist John "JD" DeServio (Black Label Society and Cycle Of Pain) on bass and as producer and is poised to see the release sometime in 2014.

Over the course of three and a half days, Le Projet wrote and recorded three songs from scratch with no preconceived notions or ideas. The band was joined by former Black Label Society guitarist Nick Catanese during these sessions. What came to be is "Little Shits", "Save Yourself" and "Head Down" - three songs which define a path of destiny, encompassing bits and pieces of each members' musical pasts yet culminating into something fresh, new and exciting.

In 2015, he joined Baltimore based progressive/alternative band The Mayan Factor.

== Discography ==
=== With The Infinite Staircase ===
- The Things We Do (Acoustic Demos) (2008)
- Misty Mountain Hop: A Millennium Tribute to Led Zeppelin (2008)
- The Road Less Taken (2009)
- Lit Up: A Millennium Tribute to Buckcherry (2009)
- Single - "The Pride" (feat. Zakk Wylde, Kevin Martin, Morgan Rose & John JD DeServio) (2013)
- Single - "The Things We've Done" (feat. Lajon Witherspoon, Morgan Rose & Chris Caffery) (2013)
- No Amends (2013)
- The Dead Cricket Sessions (TBA)

=== With Le Projet ===
- Single - "Little Shits" (2014)
- Single - "Save Yourself" (2014)
- Single - "Head Down" (TBD)

=== With The Mayan Factor ===
- Single - Ascension (2016)
- Single - Hope (2018)
- Single - Whispers (2018)
- Single - Peace (2020)

=== Misc. ===
- Manhut Jingle - "No One Wants To Party In A Cave" (2014)
