= Wolves (Candlebox album) =

Studio album by Candlebox
- Released: September 17, 2021
- Recorded: August 2019 to February 2020
- Studio: Henson Studios, Los Angeles, California, United States
- Genre: Grunge; hard rock; pop rock
- Length: 51:50
- Language: English
- Label: Pavement Entertainment
- Producer: Dean Dichoso

Candlebox chronology
Disappearing in Airports (2016)	Wolves (2021)	The Long Goodbye (2023)

Singles from Wolves
- 1. "My Weakness" Released: March 8, 2021

“It’s a story I think a lot of people can relate to, not only musicians. It’s like the boxer who’s on his last legs. He still has an opportunity. You really can’t count anyone out.”

—Vocalist Kevin Martin on themes of survival through highs and lows.

Wolves is a 2021 studio album by American grunge band Candlebox. The album was recorded in late 2019 into early 2020, but release was pushed back due to the COVID-19 pandemic. The album continues exploring pop rock that started with 2016's Disappearing in Airports and has received positive reviews from critics.

== Reception ==
Writing for Classic Rock, Malcolm Dome gave this album a 7 out of 10, writing that the band "are still a force", writing that it is "another winner "laced with the instant melodic sensibility and spikey grunge style rhythms which have always been the Seattle band’s trademark". Glide Magazine's Jeremy Lukens wrote that Candlebox "still has some good rock music to share" and that the album successfully mixes hard rock with lighter pop tunes.

== Track listing ==
All lyrics are written by Kevin Martin

1. "All Down Hill From Here" (Martin, Christopher Thorn) – 4:39
2. "Let Me Down Easy" (Martin, Peter Cornell) – 3:15
3. "Riptide" (Martin, Chris Santillo, Keith Longo, William Barry) – 5:28
4. "Sunshine" (Martin) – 4:59
5. "My Weakness" (Don Miggs, Donald Patrick, Meigel Miggs) – 4:35
6. "We" (Adam Kury, Brian Quinn, Island Styles, Dave Krusen) – 5:34
7. "Nothing Left to Lose" (Martin, Kury, Sean Hennesy) – 3:16
8. "Lost Angeline" (Martin, Hennesy) – 4:59
9. "Trip" (Martin, Hennesy) – 4:26
10. "Don't Count Me Out" (Martin, Thorn) – 5:05
11. "Criminals" (Kury, Quinn, Styles, Krusen) – 5:34

== Personnel ==
Candlebox

- Dave Krusen – drums
- Adam Kury – bass guitar
- Kevin Martin – vocals
- Brian Quinn – acoustic guitar, electric guitar
- Island Styles – guitar

Additional personnel

- Joe Chiccarelli – mixing on "Riptide"
- Ian Dartez – backing vocals
- Nick Dees – backing vocals
- Dean Dichoso – acoustic guitar, baritone guitar, tambourine, backing vocals, production
- Sean Dore – layout
- Kevin Haaland – electric guitar, mandolin
- Nicholas Haas – backing vocals
- Sean Hennesy – guitar on "All Down Hill from Here", "Sunshine", "Nothing Left to Lose", and "Trip"
- David Hitchcock – piano
- Marta Honer – viola, violin
- Brad Lambert – backing vocals
- Miren Leyzaola – cover art
- Grant McFarland – mixing except on "Riptide", mastering
- Lowell David Murray – acoustic guitar
- Ro Rowan – cello
- Carson Slovak – mixing except on "Riptide", mastering
- Ken Sluiter – mixing engineering on "Riptide"

== See also ==
- List of 2021 albums
