= King's Royal (disambiguation) =

Kings Royal is an annual sprint car event held at Eldora Speedway in Ohio, U.S.

King's Royal or Kings Royal may also refer to:

== Arts and entertainment ==
- The Kings Royal, an American rock band
- King's Royal, a 1975 novel by John Quigley
- King's Royal (TV serial), a 1982–1983 British adaptation of Quigley's novel

== Military ==
- King's Royal Hussars, a cavalry regiment of the British Army
- King's Royal Regiment of New York, a Loyalist regiment raised in Canada during the American Revolutionary War
- King's Royal Rifle Corps, a British Army formation (1755–1958)
