= Pete RG =

American singer-songwriter

- Born: Peter Argyropoulos; Los Angeles
- Genres: Indie rock; Alternative rock
- Occupations: Singer; Songwriter; Guitarist; Producer
- Instruments: Vocals; Guitar; Keyboards; Drum machine
- Years active: 2012–present
- Label: 4L Entertainment
- Members: Brina Kabler; Adam Kury; Dave Krusen; Kevin Haaland
- Website: pete-rg.com

Peter Argyropoulos, better known by his stage name Pete RG, is an American singer-songwriter and producer based in Los Angeles. After being the lead singer and principal songwriter of the band Last December, he embarked upon a solo career. Since then, he has recorded and released an LP and two EPs. All were met with positive reviews. He is also the founder of 4L Entertainment.

== Early life ==
Pete RG's father, James Argyropoulos, grew up in a small village in the mountains of Southern Greece. He emigrated to the United States along with his parents and siblings when he was a teen. Pete grew up in Venice Beach, Los Angeles. He learned music from his parents, who were aspiring musicians in the 1960s and 1970s. He grew up singing, playing drums, clarinet and keyboards. In his senior year of high school, Pete RG began playing guitar.

While at Franklin & Marshall College in Lancaster, Pete formed a cover band where he sang and played guitar. During his first year, he wrote his first song, called The Sun Does Rise.

=== Last December ===
In 1998, RG formed Los Angeles-based indie pop/Americana band Last December. He was the principal songwriter, lead singer and bandleader. The band's members included lead guitarist Jason Koehler, bassist Adam Kury and drummer Scotty Kormos. Their debut album Without Wings followed in the fall of 1999. They signed with a major label and had different sessions with different producers.

In 2007, Last December teamed up with producer-engineer Brian Malouf to co-produce their acclaimed 2007 full-length album Hailstorm. Even with the band's success, Argyropoulos began writing new songs for a solo project beginning in 2003. After the band drifted apart in 2007, he started producing different acts as well as writing music for television.

== Solo career ==
Pete RG broke out as a solo artist in 2013. His name is Peter Argyropoulos, but since he was called "Argy" as a kid, he decided to use the artistic name Pete RG. His debut full-length album as Pete RG was New Eyes. It was described as "plucky fits of banjo, understated rhythms, and Pete's coffee coated vocals." New Eyes was co-produced by producer and engineer Brina Kabler, RG's musical partner, who would go on to co-produce his next EPs.

=== Lightning Strikes ===
On February 10, 2015, RG released the EP Lightning Strikes. A collection of six songs, the EP was preceded by a lyric video for the single Still Here. The song was described as having "a country edge to it while producing a U2-esque vibe".

Lightning Strikes was recorded and mixed primarily at RG's personal studio in Santa Monica. Additional tracking and mixing was done by engineer Brian Scheuble, who worked with such acts as U2, Elton John and Sheryl Crow.

The EP met with good reviews, which pointed out that RG is "speckled with hints of Neil Diamond, Leonard Cohen and Matt Berninger, [and] blessed to have a voice so unique, so enchanting and so captivating." The reviewers noted a change in style: "leaving behind the Americana and folk stylings of New Eyes, Lightning Strikes veers more towards Pete Yorn than that of, say, Pete Yarrow."

On March 3, 2015, RG and Kabler promoted the EP with a month and a half long tour across the U.S. They were joined by Kury and Noah Lebenzon on lead guitar. Since Kormos was not able to join them, Pearl Jam's original drummer Dave Krusen was recruited and became a permanent member of the band.

=== Reaching for the Moon ===
The EP Reaching for the Moon was also recorded in RG's private Santa Monica studio. This time lead guitarist Kevin Haaland was brought in to collaborate with RG, Kabler, Kury, and Krusen. The first single was called Divine. All of the songs were written in the same key, the key of C, as they all began as an attempt to finish the same song, Our Escape. Co-produced and engineered by Brina Kabler, the EP was released on October 9, 2015.

With a "soulful and rustic rock sound [celebrating] the splendor of life, it is five tracks of pure sonic goodness." It was described as "energetic, yearning rock based around ringing guitars and shimmering textures", "tight, danceable and at the same time really good rock n' roll", and "the warmth of a troubadour brought up on the traveling spirit songs of The Boss."

Pete RG himself described his sound as "indie rock in the vein of bands like The National and The War On Drugs with some Bruce Springsteen and Neil Diamond added to the mix," adding that his major influences included U2.

The EP was promoted on RG's American tour from September 19 to November 14, including several stops at Pianos in New York City as part of a monthlong residency.

On February 23, 2016, it was announced that Pete RG will be supporting Candlebox on their Disappearing in Airports tour.

RG will be releasing the LP Sentimental Fool in the summer of 2016 followed by a Fall 2016 tour.

== 4L Entertainment ==
In 2013, RG founded imprint, indie-rock label 4L Entertainment with former Beggars Group & Matador Records tour marketing director Alex Moreno. Both Lightning Strikes and Reaching for the Moon were released by 4L. Moreno, the label's general manager, also booked both RG's Spring and Fall 2015 tours as part of 4L's in-house tour booking division.

== Sons of Silver ==
In 2019, Pete RG transformed into rock & roll band Sons of Silver. The lead singer uses his given name Peter Argyropoulos.

== Discography ==
=== Singles ===
Year	Title	Album
2012	"New Eyes"	
2013	"Always Christmas"	
2015	"Still Here"	

=== Extended plays ===
Year	Title	Label
2012	New Eyes	4L Entertainment
2015	Lightning Strikes	4L Entertainment
2015	Reaching for the Moon	4L Entertainment

== Music videos ==
Year	Song	Album	Director
2012	"New Eyes"	New Eyes	Cary Gallagher
2012	"Alone"	New Eyes	Nathan Shepherd
2012	"Hailstorm"	New Eyes	Cary Gallagher
2013	"Always Christmas"		Cary Gallagher
2015	"Let It All Go"	Lightning Strikes	Simon Chan
