= Disappearing in Airports =

Studio album by Candlebox
- Released: April 22, 2016
- Genre: Post-grunge; alternative rock
- Length: 47:00
- Label: Pavement Music

Candlebox chronology
Love Stories & Other Musings (2012)	Disappearing in Airports (2016)	Wolves (2021)

Singles from Disappearing In Airports
- 1. "Vexatious" Released: February 2016

Professional ratings
Review scores
Source	Rating
AllMusic	3.5/5 stars

Disappearing in Airports is the sixth studio album by the American rock band Candlebox. It was released on April 22, 2016, on Pavement Entertainment. It is also the first album without original guitarist Peter Klett, and has only singer Kevin Martin left from the original lineup. Former Pearl Jam drummer Dave Krusen returned for the album.

== Track listing ==
All tracks are written by Candlebox.

Disappearing in Airports track listing
No.	Title	Length
1.	"Only Because of You"	3:54
2.	"Vexatious"	3:48
3.	"Supernova"	3:43
4.	"Alive at Last"	5:34
5.	"I've Got a Gun"	4:22
6.	"I Want It Back"	4:09
7.	"The Bridge"	5:08
8.	"Spotlights"	5:10
9.	"Crazy"	3:25
10.	"God's Gift"	3:14
11.	"Keep on Waiting" (Digipak Bonus Track)	4:36

== Personnel ==
- Kevin Martin – lead vocals
- Mike Leslie – lead guitar
- Brian Quinn – rhythm guitar
- Adam Kury – bass
- Dave Krusen – drums

== Charts ==
Chart (2016)	Peak position
US Billboard 200	112
