= Into the Sun (Candlebox album) =

Studio album by Candlebox
- Released: July 22, 2008
- Recorded: 2007
- Genre: Post-grunge
- Length: 49:05
- Label: Silent Majority Group
- Producer: Ron Aniello

Candlebox chronology
Happy Pills (1998)	Into the Sun (2008)	Love Stories & Other Musings (2012)

Professional ratings
Review scores
Source	Rating
AbsolutePunk.net	74% link
AllMusic	link
Rolling Stone	link

Into the Sun is the fourth studio album by Seattle post-grunge band Candlebox. Released in 2008, it is their first album since 1998's Happy Pills and would mark both the band's studio return after a seven-year hiatus as well as their first album with Silent Majority Group.

== Recording and background ==
In 2005, Kevin Martin wrote a song entitled "Stand" with fellow musician and Hiwatts bandmate Space. However, he felt the track didn't suit Hiwatts and that it was "just too Candlebox." By the following year, Rhino Records, through Warner Bros., contacted Martin regarding an upcoming Candlebox best-of compilation. Martin and Peter Klett favored the idea and decided the band should tour for its promotion, thus ending their indefinite hiatus.

After a successful tour, bassist Bardi Martin left the band to continue his education, allowing Adam Kury to take his place. Candlebox wrote new material from November 2006 through January the following year; however, this would all be discarded as it was considered poor. They began writing more material soon after, prompting Martin to introduce "Stand" to his bandmates. While chemistry did not set in immediately during the writing process, Klett noted that old issues between bandmates were able to gradually subside.

Much like with their debut album, Candlebox performed the new songs live for several months to ensure their quality. Recording for Into the Sun began that year and took a mere five weeks. Peter Klett came up with the working title Play the Movie which gained some support but was ultimately discarded.

Into the Sun features three of the founding four members of Candlebox; only Martin has been replaced by Kury. Tracks 1, 3, 4, 6, 7, 8, 9, and 10 all feature drums by Dave Krusen, who previously joined the band from 1997 to 1999.

There were a few things we had to relearn. The writing process was a little different now that we have both grown up as musicians and have worked with other people. We’re not who we were when we were 19, 20 years old when we first started this band. We’re older now. We’re a different band. So we had to rethink the whole element of sitting down in a rehearsal studio and working together, because I live in Los Angeles and Pete and Scott still live in Seattle. So there were a few things we had to take into consideration, and figure out if it was really going to work. And I think what we found in the process of writing these songs over the past two years and making sure that we were headed in the right direction… was that we were in fact headed in the right direction. We knew exactly what we were doing and were doing it the right way.

— Kevin Martin

== Music and lyrics ==
Kevin Martin described Into the Sun in a 2007 interview:

It's politically driven. I’m not afraid to say it's politically driven towards the administration now but not every song's that way. Every song has a politic of sorts with relationships in regards to life, friends, family, and stuff like that. There's quite a few really kind of dark, moody album tracks they’re going to be long and very Pink Floyd-ish. It's very reminiscent of the first record. I guess that would be the best thing to say.

— Kevin Martin

== Touring and promotion ==
Candlebox toured extensively in promotion of Into the Sun including the Heritage and Freedom Fest in front of a record crowd. On August 9, 2010, the band also kicked off a five-show stint overseas performing for U.S. troops at Camp Arifjan in Kuwait and continued on to Iraq.

The song "Stand" was released as a single and found considerable radio play. According to Martin, the song was "inspired by the second elected term of George Bush, and how people didn't figure out the first time around that he's a complete and utter buffoon. But more so, it's about society in general, and the fact that you’ve got to pull your head out of the sand and reclaim this country."

To provide the album further exposure, the band released five songs, two weeks apart, leading up to the release Into the Sun. "Surrendering," "Miss You," and "A Kiss Before" were also released as singles.

== Track listing ==
1. "Stand" – 3:30
2. "Bitches Brewin'" – 3:37
3. "Surrendering" – 3:29
4. "Into the Sun" – 4:53
5. "Underneath It All" – 3:36
6. "Miss You" – 5:07
7. "How Does It Feel" – 3:57
8. "A Kiss Before" – 3:27
9. "Breathe Me In (Intro)" – 3:19
10. "Breathe Me In" – 5:12
11. "Lover – Come Back to Me" – 4:43
12. "Consider Us" – 4:09

Amazon Store & iTunes Store bonus track

13. "The Answer" – 6:37

== Personnel ==
Candlebox

- Kevin Martin – lead vocals
- Peter Klett – lead guitar
- Sean Hennesy – rhythm guitar
- Adam Kury – bass
- Scott Mercado – drums

Additional musicians and production

- Walker Gibson – keys
- Dave Krusen – drums
- Ron Aniello – production
- Clif Norrell – engineer, mixing
- Gregory Reaves – mixing
