= Le Projet =

American hard rock band

Le Projet is an American hard rock band from Los Angeles, California; Atlanta, Georgia; and Staten Island, New York. The band features lead vocalist Kevin Martin, guitarist Brian Quinn & bassist Adam Kury from the band Candlebox, guitarist Lenny Cerzosie from the band The Infinite Staircase, and drummer Morgan Rose from the band Sevendust.

== History ==
The initial concept for this project began in 2013 when Martin, Rose and Cerzosie released a single to benefit victims of Hurricane Sandy called "The Pride" with Cerzosie's band The Infinite Staircase. Also featured on the track are Black Label Society's Zakk Wylde and John "JD" DeServio. The song spent six weeks in the American Mainstream Rock Radio Top 40 Chart, peaking at #27.

The musicians gelled so well that talk began early on of future collaborations. With everyone's ever-changing schedules, it almost seemed impossible, that is, until a few months ago when the Cerzosie brothers reached out to everyone with a common break in schedules coinciding mid-May. With a brief break in Sevendust's current tour schedule and Candlebox finally lightening their dates after their successful 20th Anniversary Tour, everything finally fell into place.

Over the course of three and a half days, the group wrote and recorded three songs from scratch with no preconceived notions or ideas. The band was joined by former Black Label Society guitarist Nick Catanese during these sessions.

What came to be is "Little Shits", "Save Yourself" and "Head Down" - three songs which define a path of destiny, encompassing bits and pieces of each members' musical pasts yet culminating into something fresh, new and exciting.

== Members ==
- Kevin Martin- lead vocals
- Lenny Cerzosie- lead guitar
- Brian Quinn- rhythm guitar
- Adam Kury- bass
- Morgan Rose- drums
