= The Kings Royal =

American rock band

- Origin: Los Angeles, California, United States
- Genres: Alternative rock, rock
- Years active: 2007–present
- Members: Benny Marchant; Sean Hennesy; Walker Gibson; Adam Kury; Dave Krusen
- Past members: Sean Hurley; Brian Burwell
- Website: www.thekingsroyal.com

The Kings Royal (TKR) is an American rock band formed in Los Angeles, California in early 2007. The band is made up of Benny Marchant on vocals and guitar, Sean Hennesy (The Hiwatts, Candlebox, The Gracious Few) on lead guitar, Walker Gibson on keyboards, Adam Kury (The Hiwatts, Candlebox) on bass and Dave Krusen (Pearl Jam, Candlebox) on drums.

== History ==
The Kings Royal initially recorded 20 songs with David J. Holman producing, some with Sean Hurley (of Vertical Horizon) on bass guitar and Brian "Dogboy" Burwell (of Neve) on drums. They performed in clubs in and around Los Angeles, such as the Viper Room and the Whisky a Go Go. The band toured with the alternative rock band Candlebox in the summer of 2008. They played in 42 cities in North America, with Sean Hennesy and Adam Kury playing with both bands.

The band's first record Beginning was released July 2, 2008. The song "Yes She Does (Stripped)" was released digitally in July 2009. It was originally part of a 5-song EP that is as yet unreleased.

== Band members ==
=== Current ===
- Benny Marchant – vocals, guitar
- Sean Hennesy – lead guitar
- Walker Gibson – keyboard
- Adam Kury – bass guitar
- Dave Krusen – drums

=== Former ===
- Sean Hurley – bass guitar
- Brian "Dogboy" Burwell – drums
