= Love Stories & Other Musings =

Studio album by Candlebox
- Released: April 3, 2012
- Recorded: 2011
- Genre: Post-grunge, alternative rock, hard rock
- Length: 36:37 (60:40 w/ bonus tracks)
- Label: Audionest; Fontana; Universal
- Producer: Ken Andrews

Candlebox chronology
Into the Sun (2008)	Love Stories & Other Musings (2012)	Disappearing in Airports (2016)

Singles from Love Stories & Other Musings
- 1. "Believe in It" Released: 2012

Professional ratings
Review scores
Source	Rating
AllMusic	3.5/5 stars

Love Stories & Other Musings is the fifth studio album by the alternative rock band Candlebox. It was released in 2012 on Audionest.

== Reception ==
Stephen Thomas Erlewine of AllMusic thought the album to be Candlebox's best and richest album, and that this is due to a combination of "the melodicism of post-grunge and bear the lightness and nimble chops that come with middle age."

The album debuted at No. 82 on the Billboard 200, and No. 25 on Top Rock Albums. with around 5,000 copies sold in its first week. The album has sold 21,000 copies as of April 2016.

== Track listing ==
No.	Title	Length
1.	"Youth in Revolt"	3:19
2.	"Sweet Summertime"	3:50
3.	"Believe in It"	3:49
4.	"She Come Over Me"	4:54
5.	"Turn Your Heart Around"	4:04
6.	"Lifelike Song"	4:37
7.	"Come Home"	3:58
8.	"Baby Love Me"	3:34
9.	"Them Eyes"	4:32
10.	"Far Behind (rerecording) (bonus)"	4:52
11.	"You (rerecording) (bonus)"	5:01
12.	"Cover Me (rerecording) (bonus)"	4:44
13.	"Change (rerecording) (bonus)"	6:18
14.	"Simple Lessons (rerecording) (bonus)"	3:08

No.	Title	Length
15.	"Out Here All Night (Damone cover) (Amazon Exclusive)"	3:23

No.	Title	Length
15.	"No Lights (iTunes Exclusive)"	3:42

Tracks 10–14 are rerecordings of band's previous hits.

== Personnel ==
=== Candlebox ===
- Kevin Martin – lead vocals
- Peter Klett – lead guitar
- Sean Hennesy – rhythm guitar
- Adam Kury – bass
- Scott Mercado – drums

=== Additional musicians ===
- Dave Krusen – drums
- Walker Gibson – keyboards

== Charts ==
Chart (2013)	Peak position
US Billboard 200	82
US Top Alternative Albums (Billboard)	16
US Top Hard Rock Albums (Billboard)	7
US Independent Albums (Billboard)	12
US Top Rock Albums (Billboard)	25
