= Akathisia (album) =

Studio album by Hovercraft
- Released: February 11, 1997
- Recorded: December 1995
- Genre: Experimental rock
- Length: 64:48
- Label: Blast First/Mute
- Producer: Hovercraft

Hovercraft chronology
| Akathisia (1997) | Experiment Below (1998) |

Professional ratings
Review scores
| Source | Rating |
|---|---|
| AllMusic | 4/5 stars |
| Pitchfork Media | 4.5/10 |

Akathisia is the debut studio album by the instrumental experimental rock group Hovercraft. It was released on February 11, 1997, through Blast First/Mute Records.

== Overview ==
In 1997, the band were signed to Blast First Records in London by label head Paul Smith. In North America, debut album (released as double-LP and single CD) Akathisia was distributed by Mute Records America. Ned Raggett of Allmusic said that "the trio on Akathisia did a fantastic job of whipping up five dark, engrossing instrumentals that avoided any pretense of commercial acceptance." Group photos distributed to the press were shot in silhouette, contributing further to the group's shadowy mystique. A photo of the group does appear inside Akathisia, though Beth Liebling is obscured by darkness. Akathisia's liner notes state that the album was "preserved and magnetically encoded 12.1995."

The vinyl etchings on the four sides of Akathisia were as follows:

- Side A: "Do You..."
- Side B: "Dare To..."
- Side C: "Enter The..."
- Side D: "Black Hole?"

(This was the slogan of the cult classic 1980s Gottlieb pinball game, Black Hole.)

Hovercraft played at the first Terrastock festival in Providence, Rhode Island, in April 1997. The band then toured with Japan's Kirihito and American rock band Caustic Resin, and handled the opening slot on a tour with Fugazi, as well as a tour opening for Helmet and the Melvins. An EP featuring remixes of two truncated Akathisia songs by Scanner was released later in 1997.

== Track listing ==
| No. | Title | Length |
|---|---|---|
| 1. | "Quiet Room (44)" | 15:34 |
| 2. | "Angular Momentum" | 11:02 |
| 3. | "Haloparidol" | 12:31 |
| 4. | "Vagus Nerve" | 12:28 |
| 5. | "De-Orbit Burn" | 13:09 |

== Personnel ==
- Campbell 2000 – guitar
- Karl 3-30 – drums
- Sadie 7 – bass guitar
