= Hovercraft (band) =

American rock band

- Origin: Seattle, Washington, U.S.
- Genres: Experimental rock, noise rock, post-rock, space rock
- Years active: 1993–2001
- Labels: Blast First/Mute, Repellent
- Spinoff of: Pearl Jam
- Past members: Campbell 2000; Sadie 7 Dash 11; Paul 4 Jerome230; Karl 3-30

Hovercraft was an American instrumental experimental rock group that formed in Seattle, Washington in 1993. It was co-founded by its core duo of guitarist/samplist/tape-looper Ryan Shinn and bassist Beth Liebling. Shinn and Liebling would use the pseudonyms "Campbell 2000" and "Sadie 7", respectively, throughout the duration of the band's history. Hovercraft has been cited as one of the most abrasive, non-commercial sounding bands ever to receive major-label distribution for its albums. Though somewhat overlooked and sometimes heavily criticized because of the band's early association with Pearl Jam singer Eddie Vedder, the group was largely well respected and well received by critics and developed a cult following.

== History ==
=== Early history ===
Beth Liebling and Ryan Shinn met in an anatomy class for surgical students. Prior to forming the trio Hovercraft, Liebling and Shinn played together in Space Helmet. Space Helmet broke up when Shinn moved to New York and the other members of Space Helmet, including Shinn's brother, formed the band Magnog. Shinn's departure for New York was short and upon his return, Hovercraft was formed.

Hovercraft's material consisted of lengthy songs featuring an avant-garde and moody sound that was a direct reaction to the local grunge scene. Hovercraft's sound came to be characterized by the sounds a bee makes, which made heavy use of delay and reverb on Shinn's main guitar, a Fender Stratocaster. The use of looping effects enabled Shinn to often simulate the simultaneous playing of multiple guitarists, though he was always the lone guitarist, both in the studio and onstage. Leibling generally played single-note, ominous, pulsating bass lines, played "clean" (with no effects). Early drum beats were generally sparse, yet jazzy. The band arrangement became more complex over the years.

On January 8, 1995, recordings by Hovercraft and Magnog were played back to back on Pearl Jam's Self-Pollution satellite radio broadcast, a four-and-a-half-hour-long pirate broadcast out of Seattle, Washington which was available to any radio stations that wanted to carry it. The tracks which followed immediately after Pearl Jam's final set are described by Eddie Vedder as a "cleansing of the palate." The recording would appear on Hovercraft's first release, a seven-inch single on the band's own Repellent Records, run by David Meinert who also managed the band. Recorded in August 1994, "Zero Zero Zero One" featured Bobby Tamkin aka "Paul 4" on drums and on "box of nails." No track titles were given, but "0001-A" and "0001-B" are etched into either band of the vinyl sides. It was also released as a VHS tape "video single" in a simple black slipcase. Pearl Jam's Self-Pollution broadcast also featured humorous, holiday answering machine messages from Bobby Tamkin and Matt Lukin of Mudhoney.

The single was initially handed out at gigs; stickers affixed to the plastic slip of ones sold in stores and put on by the distributor boasted, "Featuring Eddie Vedder of Pearl Jam". However, the single featured Bobby Tamkin on drums, not Vedder as rumored. All the singles were pulled out of the stores at the demand of Repellent Records, and the stickers removed. "Paul 4" is the pseudonym of early member Bobby Tamkin, currently with his own bands, MOTO SOLO, Xu Xu Fang and former drummer of The Warlocks and Kerosene 454. In 1995, Hovercraft accepted a slot opening for Mike Watt on his U.S. tour, joined by Vedder and Tamkin on drums. Hovercraft, and Dave Grohl's new band Foo Fighters, played short sets before both Grohl and Vedder would join headliner Watt as members of his band. This was Hovercraft's first tour, as well as the first major tour for Grohl since the suicide of Kurt Cobain. Hovercraft toured later that year with Sky Cries Mary.

Though Vedder donned a long wig in order to conceal his face somewhat, his true identity soon become widely known. Subsequent Hovercraft tours would often be flooded with fans of the Pearl Jam frontman. During the Watt tour, Vedder was replaced by Bobby Tamkin's return to the band. Tamkin left the band following the tour, and was soon replaced by former Pearl Jam drummer, Dave Krusen, who adopted the stage name "Karl 3-30." Hovercraft toured in 1995 opening for Sweet 75. (Like Dave Grohl, Krist Novoselic's first tour following Cobain's suicide featured Hovercraft). Hovercraft would join Sky Cries Mary and Sweet 75 for Microsoft and World Domination Recordings' joint "Transmissions from Space" tour in November 1995, an interactive, multi-media exposition highlighting the new CD Plus technology.

=== Angular momentum (live performances, motifs) ===
Live shows were marked by a stage prepared in advance of entrance by crowds. When the band did enter, not a word was uttered, and eye contact was never made with spectators. The stage was shrouded in darkness as a projector played black & white scientific films and space-themed documentary clips from the reel-to-reel era (1940s-1970s), and free-use stock footage, somewhat synchronized to the music. Examples of film material include insects mating, time-lapse footage of flowers blooming, and asteroids crashing. Though often featuring fragments of album tracks, each live show was played as a single forty- to forty-five-minute-long semi-improvised piece with no breaks. The film collages were created by Shinn and Liebling, and were altered for each tour the band went on. According to Shinn, the band used films in their concerts "since the very first show."

The group's artwork, album and song titles ("Haloparidol", " Vagus Nerve", "Phantom Limb", "Endoradiosonde", "Benzedrine", "De-Orbit Burn") featured foreboding themes of medical, astronautical and scientific experimentation, satellite imagery, hallucinations, and medical conditions. Though these are common in the post-rock, space rock and avant-garde music scenes, Hovercraft's are likely bolstered by Shinn and Liebling's medical/scientific training, as well as their youths:

"I think that we've always wanted to be doctors and psychiatrists. I was really sick when I was a kid so I grew up in a lot of hospitals. Sadie was in a couple of institutions... so I think we all had our eyes wide open. So I guess we've always wanted to see it from the other side." – Shinn, 1997 interview

Group photos distributed to the press were also shot in silhouette, contributing further to the group's shadowy mystique, though a photo of the group does appear inside Akathisia, though Liebling is obscured by darkness. Recorded on two days in March and April 1996, the ten-inch format of Stereo Specific Polymerization, also released on the Liebling-run Repellent, allowed for recordings that more closely approximated their live sound.

In August 1996, the band appeared on a hidden track on the Germs tribute album A Small Circle of Friends. Allegedly recorded in a "L.A. garage" in order "to capture the Germs feel", Hovercraft's contribution is a sixteen-minute-long, mostly instrumental reprise of "Shutdown". The track, which follows a more conventional version of the song by Monkeywrench, features a conversation in Italian between Shinn and Liebling, making it the only recording by the band to feature any vocalization.

After running the small club circuit of the North America a few times on their own, the band supported Unwound on a European tour. Hovercraft even opened for classic rockers The Who on a short series of stadium concerts in the Northwestern United States in late 1996.

=== Enter the black hole (signing to Blast First) ===
In 1997, the band were signed to Blast First Records in London by label head Paul Smith. In North America, debut album (released as double-LP and single CD) Akathisia was distributed by Mute Records America. Ned Raggett of Allmusic said that "the trio on Akathisia did a fantastic job of whipping up five dark, engrossing instrumentals that avoided any pretense of commercial acceptance." Akathisia's liner notes state that the album was "preserved and magnetically encoded 12.1995."

The vinyl etchings on the four sides of Akathisia were as follows:

- Side A: "Do You..."
- Side B: "Dare To..."
- Side C: "Enter The..."
- Side D: "Black Hole?"

(This was the slogan of the cult classic 1980s Gottlieb pinball game, Black Hole.)

The new lineup played at the first Terrastock festival in Providence, Rhode Island, in April 1997. The band then toured with Japan's Kirihito and American rock band Caustic Resin, and handled the opening slot on a tour with Fugazi, as well as a tour opening for Helmet and The Melvins. An EP featuring remixes of two truncated Akathisia songs by Scanner was released later in 1997.

=== Final drummer, final album ===
1998 brought yet another change of drummer as Ric Peterson took the stool as "Dash 11". His much harder-hitting, more visceral style was the apparent catalyst in the band's shift from ethereal 15-minute songs to more concise, angular arrangements. The track "Epoxy" from the band's upcoming album first premiered for the world on Pearl Jam's Monkeywrench Radio broadcast, on January 31, 1998.

One year in the making, Hovercraft's final album, Experiment Below, was released in September 1998. Jason Kaufman of Allmusic said, "This is challenging music that certainly has its rewards for those patient enough to hang around." In 1998 and 1999, Hovercraft toured Europe again with Add N to (X), and the United States with the Boredoms, The Melvins, and Mr. Bungle. The band also played a number of one-off shows with Wire, Sleater-Kinney, Hater, Mudhoney, and IQU.

=== Schema, DJ Spooky remixes and disbandment ===
Hovercraft teamed up with Stereolab guitarist/backing vocalist Mary Hansen, forming the band Schema. Schema featured vocals and instrumentals in approximately equal measure, adding some synthesizer. An eponymous maxi-EP/mini-album was released in 2000 on avant-garde Kill Rock Stars imprint, 5 Rue Christine. A second album and a tour was planned. However, while riding her bicycle in London on December 9, 2002, the 36-year-old Hansen was struck by a truck and killed.

Hovercraft and DJ Spooky worked on remixes of each other's works in the late 1990s; two DJ Spooky remixes of Hovercraft songs were released (on various-artist techno compilation albums), but Hovercraft's versions of his songs were never released. Hovercraft's last live performance was on February 16, 2001, at the Experience Music Project museum in Seattle.

== Discography ==
=== Studio albums ===
Year	Album details
1997	Akathisia: Released: February 11, 1997; Label: Blast First/Mute; Format: CD, LP
1998	Experiment Below: Released: September 22, 1998; Label: Blast First/Mute; Format: CD, LP

=== Extended plays ===
Year	Album details
1996	Hovercraft: Released: 1996; Label: Repellent; Format: LP
1997	Scanner Remixes: Released: August 12, 1997; Label: Blast First/Mute; Formats: CD, LP
2000	Schema (collaboration with Mary Hansen): Released: 2000, recorded 1999; Label: 5 Rue Christine; Format: CD

=== Singles ===
Year	Single	Album
1995	"Zero Zero Zero One"	Non-album single

=== Videos ===
Year	Video details
1995	0001: Released: 1995; Label: Repellent; Format: VHS

=== Other appearances ===
Year	Song	Title	Label
1996	"Shutdown Reprise"	A Small Circle of Friends: A Germs Tribute	Grass
1997	"De-Orbit Burn" (remix) (with Scanner)	Newman Passage – A Souvenir Compilation	Mute
1997	"Stereo Specific Polymerization" (Mad Psychotic Hyper-Accelerated Lower East Side mix) (with DJ Spooky)	Electric Ladyland, Vol. 4	Mille Plateaux
1997	"Hymn" (with Eddie Vedder)	Kerouac – kicks joy darkness	Rykodisc
1998	"Stereo Specific Polymerization" (Beneath the Underdog mix) (with DJ Spooky)	DJ Spooky Vs. Spectre	Word Sound
1998	"Haloparidol" (short version)	Chicago Cab: Soundtrack	Loosegroove
