= The Long Goodbye (Candlebox album) =

Studio album by Candlebox
- Released: August 25, 2023
- Length: 35:17 (CD, online editions)
- Language: English
- Label: Round Hill Records
- Producer: Don Miggs

Candlebox chronology
Wolves (2021)	The Long Goodbye (2023)	The Maverick Years (2023)

Singles from The Long Goodbye
- 1. "Punks" Released: July 14, 2023; 2. "What Do You Need" Released: August 16, 2023

I knew I wanted something that was different than anything we created before. The five of us wrote this record together over two different studio sessions so that's the cohesiveness of it and what we wanted. It's never felt more right.

—Kevin Martin on recording the final Candlebox album.

The Long Goodbye is the eighth studio album from American grunge band Candlebox, released on August 25, 2023. The album was promoted with the single "Punks"—a cautionary song to younger bands about the fickleness of the music industry—and a farewell tour, after which the band will break up, with vocalist Kevin Martin citing a lack of support in the music industry and the high costs of touring. The album was rereleased on streaming on July 12, 2024, entitled A Little Longer Goodbye (Tour Edition) ahead of their A Little Longer Goodbye tour which will see them opening for Bush's Loaded: Greatest Hits tour. The rerelease of the album included the three bonus tracks previously found on CD and LP editions as well as two new live recordings.

== Reception ==
Jeremy Lukens of Glide Magazine called this release "a fitting end" to the band's career, with "enough high points to show what made the band hit-makers but also some moments that serve as reminders that the band was never able to replicate the artistic and commercial achievements of the debut album".

== Track listing ==
All tracks are written by Candlebox.

The Long Goodbye track listing
No.	Title	Length
1.	"Punks"	3:16
2.	"What Do You Need?" (Featuring MONA)	3:30
3.	"Elegante"	3:29
4.	"I Should Be Happy"	2:50
5.	"Nails On a Chalkboard"	3:58
6.	"Ugly"	3:50
7.	"Maze"	3:34
8.	"Cellphone Jesus"	3:30
9.	"Foxy"	3:02
10.	"Hourglass"	4:08
Total length:		35:18

Bonus tracks (all tracks included on A Little Longer Goodbye (Tour Edition))
No.	Title	Length
11.	"Who You Are"	3:26
12.	"We're Running With the Stars"	3:59
13.	"Elegante (Live)" (Featuring MONA)	4:04
14.	"Cellphone Jesus (Live)"	3:48
15.	"Washed Up"	5:08
Total length:		55:44

== Personnel ==
Candlebox

- BJ Kerwin – drums
- Adam Kury – bass guitar
- Kevin Martin – vocals
- Brian Quinn – acoustic guitar, electric guitar
- Island Styles – guitar

Additional personnel

- Nick Brown – vocals on "What Do You Need" and "Washed Up"
- Nick Lane – engineering
- Don Miggs – production
- Mark Needham – mixing

== See also ==
- List of 2023 albums
