= You (Candlebox song) =

Single by Candlebox

from the album Candlebox
- B-side: "Pull Away"
- Released: 1994
- Recorded: 1992–April 1993
- Genre: Alternative rock
- Length: 4:56
- Label: Maverick; Sire
- Songwriter: Candlebox
- Producers: Candlebox; Kelly Gray

Candlebox singles chronology
"Change" (1993)	"You" (1994)	"Far Behind" (1993)

"You" is a song by American rock band Candlebox and the second single from their eponymous debut album. It is one of the band's most well known songs, peaking at #78 on the Billboard Hot 100. It also reached #6 on the Billboard Album Rock Tracks charts, respectively. "You" was included on The Best of Candlebox in 2006. It was also featured in the 1996 film Foxfire and appears on its soundtrack album.

== Background ==
Lead singer Kevin Martin said, "I had stolen money from my parents to buy drugs and I had a real problem when I was in high school. On my 18th birthday I went to see Midnight Oil and Peter Garrett just floored me as a frontman. I woke up the next morning and said, 'That's it,' and I quit. I paid my parents back and I haven't done drugs since. Well, I don't consider mushrooms and anything that's organic or natural to be a drug. So I still smoke pot every now and then. So that song's really about just saying goodbye to that dependency."

== Music video ==
There are two versions to the "You" video. One was directed by Samuel Bayer and shows a live performance of the band in a studio with various dark imagery. This is the studio version of the song. The second version is a live performance cut into a music video format. It is very similar to Pearl Jam's "Even Flow" video. The audio is noticeably heavier as are Kevin Martin's vocals.

== Track list ==
1. You (Svendel Mix) (4:19)
2. You (Album Version) (4:55)
3. Pull Away (5:09)

== Charts ==
Chart (1994)	Peak position
US Billboard Hot 100	78
US Mainstream Rock Airplay (Billboard)	6
US Cash Box Top 100	81
