= Experiment Below =

Studio album by Hovercraft
- Released: September 22, 1998
- Recorded: 1998
- Genre: Experimental rock
- Length: 45:36
- Label: Blast First/Mute
- Producer: Hovercraft

Hovercraft chronology
Akathisia (1997)	Experiment Below (1998)

Professional ratings
Review scores
Source	Rating
AllMusic	3/5 stars
Pitchfork Media	5.8/10

Experiment Below is the second and final studio album by the instrumental experimental rock group Hovercraft. It was released on September 22, 1998, through Blast First/Mute Records.

== Overview ==
In 1998, drummer Ric Peterson joined Hovercraft as "Dash 11". His much harder-hitting, more visceral style was the apparent catalyst in the band's shift from ethereal 15-minute songs to more concise, angular arrangements. The album's track "Epoxy" was premiered on Pearl Jam's Monkeywrench Radio broadcast, on January 31, 1998. One year in the making, Experiment Below was Hovercraft's final album. Jason Kaufman of Allmusic said, "This is challenging music that certainly has its rewards for those patient enough to hang around."

== Track listing ==
No.	Title	Length
1.	"Anthropod"	6:06
2.	"Phantom Limb"	9:58
3.	"Transmitter Down"	10:07
4.	"Endoradiosonde"	6:52
5.	"Benzedrine"	1:50
6.	"Wire Trace"	5:37
7.	"Epoxy"	5:02

== Personnel ==
Hovercraft

- Campbell 2000 – guitar
- Dash 11 – drums
- Sadie 7 – bass guitar

Production

- S. Hess – orange sphere photo
- Hovercraft – production
- Aaron Warner – assistant engineering
