= The Gracious Few (album) =

Studio album by The Gracious Few
- Released: September 14, 2010
- Genre: Hard rock, alternative rock
- Label: Questionable Entertainment
- Producer: Jerry Harrison

Singles from The Gracious Few
- 1. "Honest Man" Released: June 8, 2010; 2. "Appetite" Released: October 5, 2010

The Gracious Few is the sole studio album by rock supergroup The Gracious Few.

== History ==
Drummer Chad Gracey explained the album's sound, "We knew we wanted to be a little harder than what Live had been doing and even what Candlebox had been doing. Chad Taylor comes up with a lot of the riffs that we start the songs from and he was just playing this real sort of heavy, bluesy stuff. Once we heard that we were like, 'Wow, this is kind of a Led Zeppelin, throwback feel' and it just sort of happened. We didn't consciously decide...those were just the songs that started flowing."

The first single released was "Honest Man". Singer Kevin Martin said of the song, "It reminds me of my father. He was a World War II veteran. He believed in the American dream with all his heart, he was the honest man of his generation. Now I turn on the television and see Americans without jobs, without food and without a chance to help themselves. This song is a wake up call to the forces of the world who would dare to stand in the way of our ability to provide for ourselves."

== Reception ==
Professional ratings
Review scores
| Source | Rating |
|---|---|
| Allmusic | 3.5/5 stars |
| Alternative Addiction | 3.5/5 stars |
| Type 3 Media | 9/10 stars |

Allmusic gave the album 3.5 stars out of 5, in a generally positive review. They hinted at the difficulty in creating a 'classic rock' album without sounding 'dated' by saying that the band, "Have crafted a note of fondness (not quite a love letter) to '70s hard rock that has enough post-grunge radio polish on it to keep things in perspective." A glowing review from Type 3 Media said the album contained, "An impressive collection of heavy brooding groove-laden tunes" and praised the band for, "Exploring sounds and styles they may not have been able to lay down in a studio previously."

Alternative Addiction said that, "When you throw in Live, Candlebox, classic rock and Jerry Harrison doing some decent production you get a great album by The Gracious Few." In a generally favourable review they expressed a preference for the album's heavier songs, claiming that, "The band is at its best on the edgier songs where Martin is belting out vocals, when they’re not taking advantage of that some boredom can set in."

== Track listing ==
All tracks are written by The Gracious Few, Jerry Harrison, except where noted.

The Gracious Few track listing
| No. | Title | Writer(s) | Length |
|---|---|---|---|
| 1. | "Appetite" | | 5:17 |
| 2. | "Honest Man" | | 4:13 |
| 3. | "Guilty Fever" | | 3:07 |
| 4. | "The Few" | The Gracious Few | 3:55 |
| 5. | "The Rest of You" | | 4:02 |
| 6. | "Crying Time" | | 5:29 |
| 7. | "Silly Thing" | The Gracious Few | 4:29 |
| 8. | "Closer" | The Gracious Few | 3:27 |
| 9. | "What's Wrong" | | 4:37 |
| 10. | "Tredecim" | The Gracious Few | 4:17 |
| 11. | "Nothing But Love" | The Gracious Few | 5:28 |
| 12. | "Sing" | | 5:37 |
| 13. | "All I Hear" | The Gracious Few | 4:32 |

== Personnel ==
The Gracious Few

- Kevin Martin: lead vocals
- Sean Hennesy: lead guitar, backing vocals
- Chad Taylor: rhythm guitar, backing vocals
- Patrick Dahlheimer: bass
- Chad Gracey: drums

Technical personnel

- Jerry Harrison – producer
- Tom Lord-Alge – mixing
- Lawrence Goldfarb – executive producer
- Ted Jensen – mastering
- Karl Derfler – engineer, mixing
- Matt Cohen – engineer
- Matt Wilenchick – second engineer
- Femio Hernandez – mixing assistant
- Matt Gracey – technician
- Carson Slovak – art direction, design
- Brad Kenyon – photography
- Jesse Brown – logo

== Chart performance ==
| Chart | Peak position |
|---|---|
| US Billboard 200 | 168 |
| US Billboard Heatseekers Albums | 7 |
| US Billboard Hard Rock Albums | 15 |
