= The Infinite Staircase =

The Infinite Staircase is an American hard rock band from Staten Island, New York. Since its formation in 2002 by brothers Lenny and Jeff Cerzosie, the group has released one album, and a seven-song EP. The EP charted in the Top 30 on America's Rock Radio Music Charts with their single "The Pride".

== History ==
The Infinite Staircase has recorded with several well known musicians over the years. Their 2009 full-length debut record The Road Less Taken included guest performances by Augie Ciulla (Reparata and the Delrons drummer), guitar virtuoso Blues Saraceno (Poison guitarist) and Earl Slick (David Bowie & former John Lennon guitarist). The album was also mixed by Saraceno.

In 2009 the band toured nationally with Zakk Wylde's Black Label Society, Sevendust and Dope during the “Black Label Bash Tour”.

In 2013 the band charted in the Top 30 on America's Rock Radio Music Charts with their single "The Pride", which was a song written and recorded to benefit the victims of Hurricane Sandy. "The Pride" featured guest performances by Zakk Wylde, Kevin Martin of Candlebox, Morgan Rose of Sevendust & John "JD" DeServio of Black Label Society. "The Pride" spent six weeks in the Mainstream Rock Radio Top 40 in America with its highest rank being #27.

The Infinite Staircase released “No Amends” on October 15, 2013, with a debut in the iTunes Top 100 New Rock Releases. The 7-song EP was produced by Morgan Rose (Sevendust, Call Me No One) and featured collaborations with, in addition to Rose, Lajon Witherspoon & Clint Lowery (Sevendust) as well as Zakk Wylde & John "JD" DeServio (Black Label Society), Kevin Martin & Sean Hennesy (Candlebox), Chris Caffery (Savatage/Trans-Siberian Orchestra) and Troy Cromwell (Cycle Of Pain).

The band's follow-up single, "The Things We've Done" was in rotation on Music Choice's Top 50 Active Rock Songs and at Rock and Active Rock Stations across the country.

The Infinite Staircase is currently writing a new covers EP that features bassist John "JD" DeServio (Black Label Society & Cycle Of Pain) on bass and as producer and is poised to see the release sometime in 2014.
