= Marry Me Tonight =

Studio album by HTRK
- Released: 2 February 2009
- Recorded: February 2006
- Studio: Birdland Studios, Melbourne, Australia
- Genre: Noise rock Experimental rock Shoegaze
- Length: 36:35
- Label: Blast First Petite
- Producer: Lindsay Gravina; Rowland S. Howard

Marry Me Tonight is the debut album by Berlin-based Australian band HTRK, released on 2 February 2009. Produced by Lindsay Gravina and Rowland S. Howard of The Birthday Party, the album was the group's first full-length release and was distributed by record label Blast First Petite. The music incorporates elements of noise rock, shoegaze and other genres and received positive reviews on its release.

In 2026, Uncut ranked Marry Me Tonight at number 184 in their list of "The 200 Greatest Goth Albums", naming it HTRK's "most desperate and tensely wrought" recording.

== Track listing ==
All tracks are written by Jonnine Standish, Sean Stewart and Nigel Yang.

No.	Title	Length
1.	"HA"	5:10
2.	"Rentboy"	3:38
3.	"Your Mistress Turns to Dust"	3:38
4.	"Kiss Before the Fall"	2:36
5.	"Waltz Real Slow"	5:45
6.	"Panties"	3:13
7.	"Shoot You Up"	2:35
8.	"Fascinator"	5:15
9.	"Disco"	4:48

== Personnel ==
- Jonnine Standish – vocals, percussion
- Sean Stewart – bass, programming
- Nigel Yang – guitar, programming, electronics
- Rohan Rebeiro (of My Disco) – drums
- Rowland S. Howard – guitar
- Conrad Standish (of The Devastations) – bass
