= Kevin Martin (American musician) =

American/Chilean singer (born 1969)

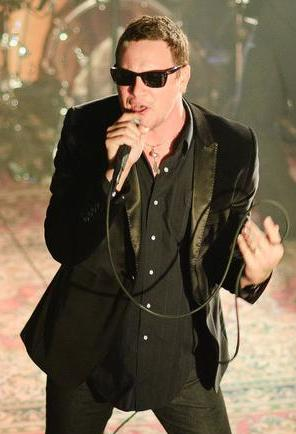
- Kevin Martin in 2008

Background information
- Born: April 9, 1969 (age 57)
- Origin: Elgin, Illinois, U.S.
- Genres: Alternative rock; post-grunge; grunge; hard rock; alternative metal
- Occupation: Singer
- Years active: 1985–present

Kevin Martin (born April 9, 1969) is an American singer who is best known as lead vocalist of the rock band Candlebox. He also provided lead vocals for the bands The Gracious Few and The Hiwatts.

== Career ==
Martin was born in Elgin, Illinois. His father worked for a salt company and the family moved to San Antonio, Texas when he was 10. They subsequently moved to Mercer Island, Washington near Seattle when Martin was 15. He and drummer Scott Mercado set out to start a band in 1990. Candlebox was formed in 1991 after guitarist Peter Klett and bassist Bardi Martin joined them. They gained a Billboard 200 top 10 hit in 1993 with their self-titled debut album, released by Maverick Records. The album's success was largely due to the single "Far Behind", a song written about two of Martin's friends who suffered heroin overdoses, including Andrew Wood of Malfunkshun and Mother Love Bone. The single reached number 18 on the US Hot 100 and was a top 10 hit in both the US Modern Rock and US Mainstream Rock charts.

Candlebox released two more albums in the 1990s, but following several line-up changes and diminishing commercial success, the group broke up in an apparent attempt to be released from the Maverick label. Maverick considered Martin the sole remaining member of Candlebox and demanded a fourth studio album before finally terminating his contract in 2000. As a result, he would no longer receive album sale royalties while the other band members would. As of April 2011 Kevin has started receiving his royalties for all 3 Candlebox records.

Following Candlebox's demise, Martin became lead vocalist for the band The Hiwatts. The group recorded the album The Possibility of Being in 2002 and began touring in early 2003. In late 2005, Martin was asked to rejoin Candlebox to promote their The Best of Candlebox compilation. The band subsequently signed with the Silent Majority Group label and began working on a new album. In 2007, Martin recorded vocals with label mates Tantric for the song "The One" from their album, The End Begins. The new Candlebox album, Into the Sun, was released in 2008 and was promoted by an extensive tour.

In 2009, Martin was invited by three former members of the band Live to form The Gracious Few, a supergroup which also includes Sean Hennesy, a member of the Hiwatts who had also joined the re-formed Candlebox as rhythm guitarist for their live shows. The Gracious Few released their self-titled debut album in September 2010 and toured the US and Europe into 2011 to promote it.

In 2014, Martin formed a side project with Sevendust drummer Morgan Rose called Le Projet.

== Discography ==
=== Candlebox ===
- Candlebox (1993)
- Lucy (1995)
- Happy Pills (1998)
- The Best of Candlebox (2006)
- Into the Sun (2008)
- Alive in Seattle (September 2, 2008)
- Love Stories & Other Musings (2012)
- Disappearing in Airports (2016)
- Wolves (2021)
- The Long Goodbye (2023)

=== Kevin Martin and the Hiwatts ===
- The Possibility of Being (2002)

=== The Gracious Few ===
- The Gracious Few (2010)

=== Other appearances ===
- Tantric – The End Begins (2008) ("The One")
- Century – Red Giant (2011) ("Oak God")
- The Infinite Staircase – "The Pride" (2013) with Morgan Rose (Sevendust; Call Me No One), Zakk Wylde (Black Label Society; Ozzy Osbourne) and John "JD" DeServio (Black Label Society; Cycle of Pain)
- Attic Theory - What we fear the most (2024) (Papier Mache)
- Saliva – Revelation: Retold (2025) (Horizon: Retold)
