= The Gracious Few =

American rock band

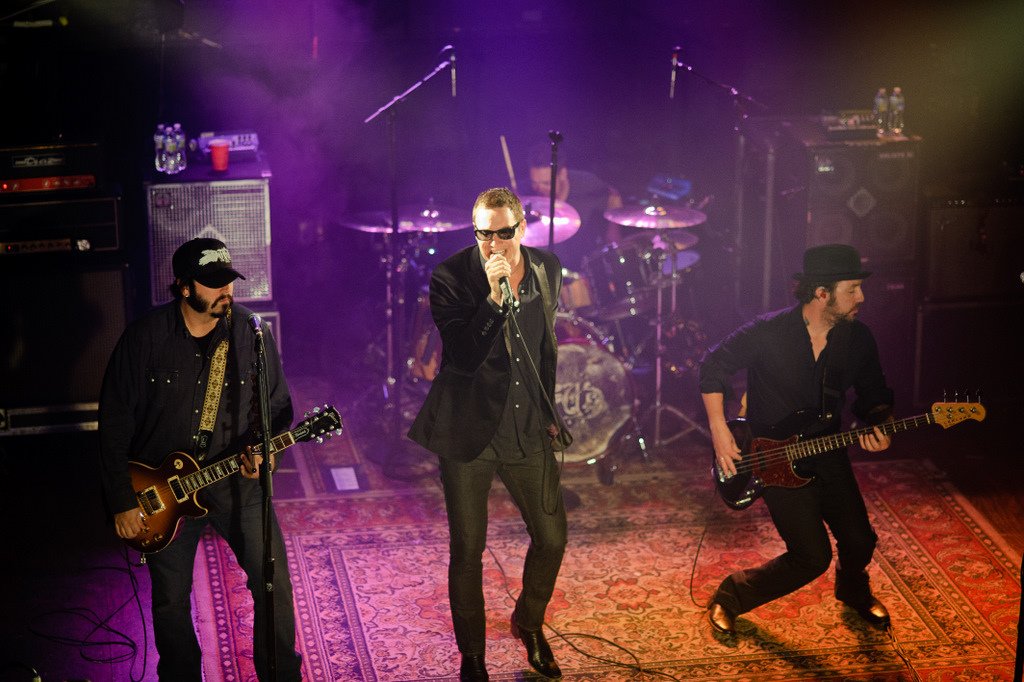
- Taylor, Martin, Gracey, and Dahlheimer on October 30, 2010

Background information
- Origin: York, Pennsylvania, U.S.
- Genres: Hard rock, alternative rock
- Years active: 2009–2011
- Label: Questionable Entertainment
- Past members: Kevin Martin; Chad Taylor; Sean Hennesy; Patrick Dahlheimer; Chad Gracey

The Gracious Few (also known as TGF) were an American alternative rock supergroup from York, Pennsylvania. The band featured guitarist Chad Taylor, bassist Patrick Dahlheimer and drummer Chad Gracey from the band Live, along with lead vocalist Kevin Martin, and guitarist Sean Hennesy from the band Candlebox.

== History ==
=== Formation ===
With Live on what they initially termed a "two-year hiatus", Taylor, Gracey and Dahlheimer were on a lookout for a vocalist for the new songs they had written. Gracey called his friend Kevin Martin and suggested that he should join them. Martin explained, "He called me and said Pat, Chad, and I have been writing and we think you are the perfect singer for this project.”

With Chad Taylor asserting that he no longer wanted to play guitar solos, Martin suggested that his Candlebox bandmate, guitarist Sean Hennesy, could do the job. Hennesy explained, "Tonally, he’s got a big, fat, manly beast sound. I have more of a high-cut karate sound that cuts through, so our tones complement each other very well." Once Hennesy was recruited, The Gracious Few's line-up was established.

On November 30, 2009, Taylor, Dahlheimer and Gracey issued a statement announcing that Live had disbanded following the departure of lead singer Ed Kowalczyk and that The Gracious Few was now their main focus. Their statement alleged that Kowalczyk had demanded a $100,000 "lead singer bonus" to appear with the band at the 2009 Pinkpop Festival, and had obtained sole publishing rights to the band's songs without the knowledge of the other three band members.

The Gracious Few played their first concert date at Fat Daddy's in York, Pennsylvania on May 27, 2010. This was followed by shows at Summerfest in Milwaukee on June 25, 2010, and The Troubador in Los Angeles on June 28.

=== The Gracious Few ===
The band began rehearsing in California in September 2009 and subsequently recorded their self-titled debut album. It was produced by Jerry Harrison of Talking Heads and mixed by Tom Lord-Alge. The first single from the album is "Honest Man". In September 2010, Martin explained that it had been difficult to schedule the recording of the album because Gracey's wife was about to give birth, Martin and Hennesy were working with Candlebox and Taylor and Dahlheimer were involved in a film project. Also the band members lived far apart; Taylor and Dahlheimer in Pennsylvania, Gracey in Orange County and Hennesy and Martin in Los Angeles. Eventually, twenty songs were written in two sessions totalling only twenty two days.

The band undertook an extensive American tour in the latter part of 2010 in support of the album, beginning in Buffalo, New York on September 24 and concluding in Ventura, California on December 11. In February 2011 the band undertook a short European tour, beginning in London on February 18 with a concert at The Barfly in Camden. They also played at the Rocklahoma festival on May 28, 2011.

In June 2011, Taylor announced that Live would be re-forming without Ed Kowalczyk. He added that new Gracious Few material would also be forthcoming.

== Discography ==
=== Studio albums ===
- The Gracious Few (2010)

=== Singles ===
- "Honest Man" (2010)
- "Appetite" (2010)
- "Great Houses" (2011) - as a free download on the band's website.

== Chart performance ==
Year	Album details	Peak chart positions		
Year	Album details	US	US Heat.	US Hard Rock
2010	The Gracious Few: Released: September 14, 2010; Label: Questionable Entertainment	168	7	15

=== Singles ===
Year	Song	US Main.	Album
2010	"Honest Man"	39	The Gracious Few
2010	"Appetite"	29	The Gracious Few

== Gallery: The Gracious Few, October 2010 ==
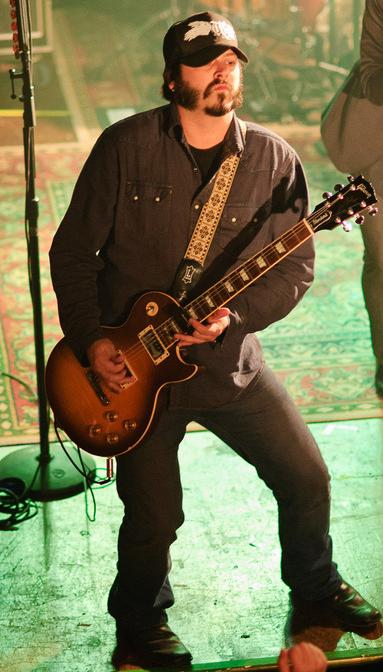
Chad Taylor - rhythm guitar

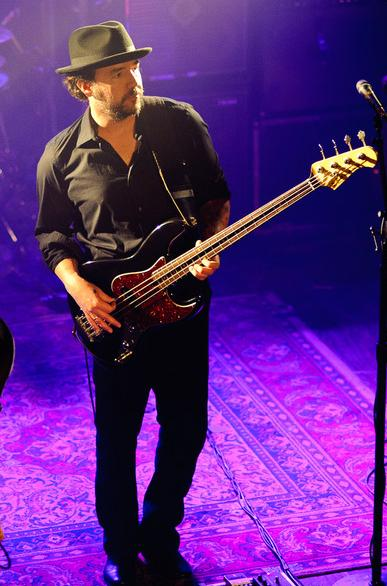
Pat Dahlheimer - bass guitar

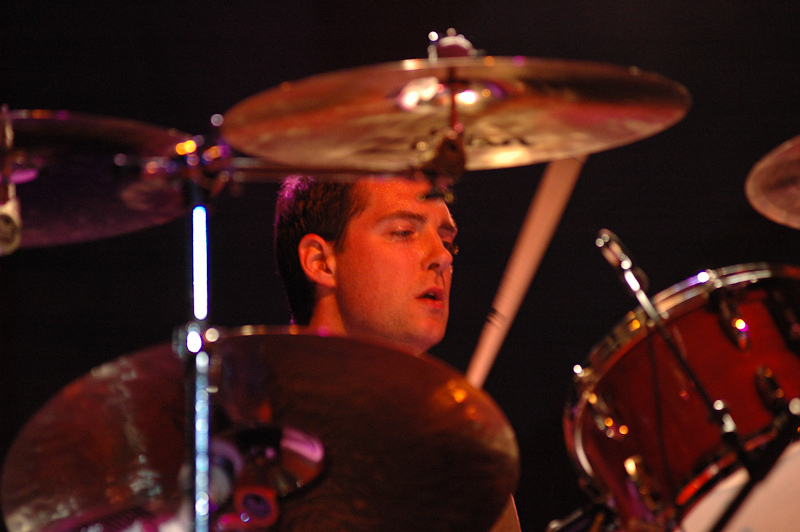
Chad Gracey - drums

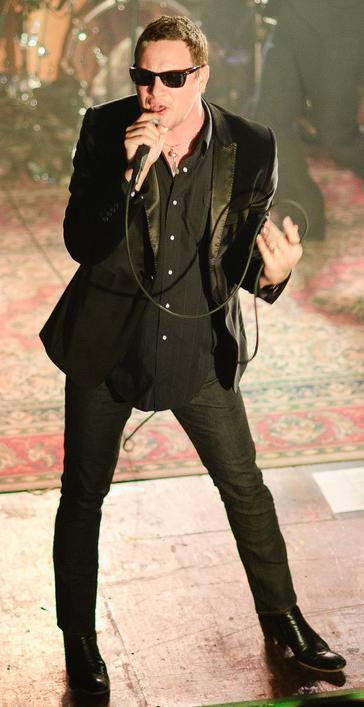
Kevin Martin - lead vocals

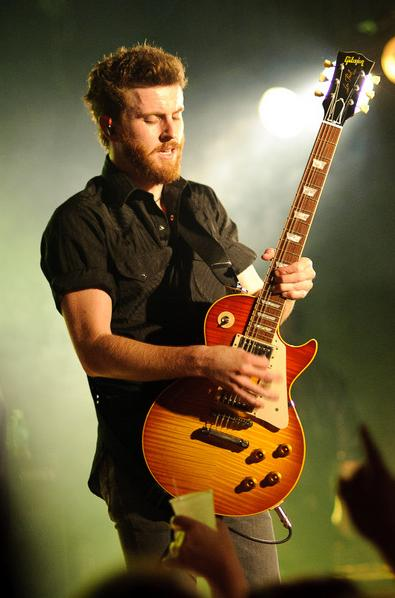
Sean Hennesy - lead guitar
