= Lucy (Candlebox album) =

Studio album by Candlebox
- Released: October 3, 1995
- Recorded: March – June 1995 - London Bridge Studio; Seattle, WA
- Genre: Grunge
- Length: 49:21
- Label: Maverick Records
- Producers: Candlebox & Kelly Gray

Candlebox chronology
Candlebox (1993)	Lucy (1995)	Happy Pills (1998)

Singles from Lucy
- 1. "Simple Lessons" Released: September 11, 1995; 2. "Understanding" Released: 1995; 3. "Best Friend" Released: 1995

Professional ratings
Review scores
Source	Rating
Allmusic	3/5 stars
Entertainment Weekly	(F)

Lucy is the second studio album by Seattle rock band Candlebox. Although the album did not fare as well as its 1993 predecessor, the single "Simple Lessons" received considerable airplay, and Lucy eventually achieved gold certification.

Four tracks from Lucy would be included on The Best of Candlebox in 2006.

== Background and recording ==
In an April 1994 interview with Playgirl, an enthusiastic Kevin Martin announced that the band had 36 new songs ready for their second album. Early versions of "Understanding (Racially Motivated)" and "Bothered" were performed live in concert that same year.

Two additional songs were recorded during the Lucy studio sessions: "Featherweight" - a B-side to the "Simple Lessons" single - and "Steel and Glass" - a John Lennon cover song released on the tribute album Working Class Hero: A Tribute to John Lennon.

== Touring and promotion ==
Beginning with a brief European leg, touring for Lucy began in September 1995 and ran through June the following year. Tour mates included Our Lady Peace, Sponge, and Seaweed. On the October 2, 1995 edition of the Late Show with David Letterman, Candlebox performed their lead single, "Simple Lessons."

Music videos were filmed for all three singles. The video for "Understanding," directed by filmmaker Gus Van Sant, memorably features the band underwater, including frontman Kevin Martin singing.

== Track listing ==
All songs written and performed by Candlebox

1. "Simple Lessons" — 2:52
2. "Drowned" — 4:51
3. "Lucy" — 4:45
4. "Best Friend" — 3:27
5. "Become (To Tell)" — 3:36
6. "Understanding" — 4:48
7. "Crooked Halo" — 4:02
8. "Bothered" — 2:16
9. "Butterfly" — 4:54
10. "It's Amazing" — 3:59
11. "Vulgar Before Me" — 3:37
12. "Butterfly (Reprise)" — 6:14

== Personnel ==
=== Candlebox ===
- Kevin Martin - lead vocals
- Peter Klett - guitar
- Bardi Martin - bass
- Scott Mercado - drums

=== Additional musicians ===
- Randy Gane - piano

== Charts ==
Chart (1995)	Peak position
US Billboard 200	11

== Certifications ==
Region	Certification	Certified units/sales
United States (RIAA)	Gold	500,000^{^}
^{^} Shipments figures based on certification alone.
