= Venus in Leo =

Studio album by HTRK
- Released: 30 August 2019
- Recorded: 2018–2019
- Studio: Dandenong Ranges, Melbourne
- Length: 41:57
- Label: Ghostly International
- Producer: HTRK

HTRK chronology
Psychic 9–5 Club (2014)	Venus in Leo (2019)	Rhinestones (2021)

Venus in Leo is the fourth studio album by Australian band HTRK. It was released on 30 August 2019 by Ghostly International. It received generally favorable reviews from critics.

== Background ==
HTRK consists of Jonnine Standish and Nigel Yang. Venus in Leo is HTRK's first studio album since Psychic 9–5 Club (2014). The album was recorded in the band's home studio in the Dandenong Ranges outside of Melbourne. It includes a cover version of Missy Elliott's song "Hit 'Em wit da Hee". Music videos were released for "You Know How to Make Me Happy", "Venus in Leo", and "New Year's Day".

== Critical reception ==
Professional ratings
Aggregate scores
Source	Rating
Metacritic	78/100
Review scores
Source	Rating
AllMusic	4.5/5 stars
Pitchfork	7.6/10
Tiny Mix Tapes	3.5/5 stars

According to the review aggregator Metacritic, Venus in Leo received "generally favorable reviews" based on a weighted average score of 78 out of 100 from 7 critic scores.

Paul Simpson of AllMusic described Venus in Leo as "HTRK's most sensuous material yet" and "the type of album that provokes repeated, enraptured listens." Joshua Minsoo Kim of Pitchfork commented that "HTRK are at their most vulnerable here, sounding in desperate need of sating desires before they are paralyzed by listlessness and disappointment." He added, "Venus in Leo is an album for those who feel doomed to a repeating cycle of failed loves and dashed hopes, for when one's existence can resemble the fading apparitions that adorn the album cover." Will Lynch of Resident Advisor stated, "HTRK create something their fans will never tire of: a dark, sensual, poetic languor that's theirs alone."

=== Accolades ===
Year-end lists for Venus in Leo
Publication	List	Rank	Ref.
DJ Mag	DJ Mag's Top 50 Albums of 2019	42	

== Track listing ==
All tracks are written by Jonnine Standish and Nigel Yang, except "Hit 'Em wit da Hee" by Melissa Elliott, Kim Jones, and Timothy Mosley.

No.	Title	Length
1.	"Into the Drama"	3:51
2.	"Mentions"	6:22
3.	"Venus in Leo"	5:46
4.	"You Know How to Make Me Happy"	3:47
5.	"Dream Symbol"	5:20
6.	"Hit 'Em wit da Hee"	3:17
7.	"Dying of Jealousy"	5:16
8.	"New Year's Day"	3:56
9.	"New Year's Eve"	4:22
Total length:		41:57

== Personnel ==
Credits adapted from liner notes.

- HTRK – production
- Nigel Yang – mixing
- Jeremy Yang – mixing
- Rashad Becker – mastering
- Warwick Baker – cover photography
- Nathan Corbin – inside photography
- Tony Lowe – inside photography
- JCS – sleeve design
