= Far Behind =

Single by Candlebox

from the album Candlebox
- B-side: "Far Behind (Live)"
- Released: August 22, 1994
- Recorded: 1992
- Length: 4:59
- Label: Maverick; Sire
- Songwriter: Candlebox
- Producers: Candlebox; Kelly Gray

Candlebox singles chronology
"You" (1993)	"Far Behind" (1994)	"Cover Me" (1994)

Music video
- "Far Behind" on YouTube

"Far Behind" is a song by the American rock band Candlebox from their eponymous debut album (1994). The song was released as the album's third single on August 22, 1994. It was the band's second and final entry on the Billboard Hot 100, where it peaked at number 18 after spending nearly a year on the chart, making it their highest-charting song. It also reached number 4 and number 7, on the Billboard Album Rock Tracks and Modern Rock Tracks charts, respectively. "Far Behind" was also included on The Best of Candlebox in 2006.

== Meaning ==
"Far Behind" is one of a few hit 1990s singles written in tribute to the late singer Andrew Wood. In a 1994 interview with Playgirl, Candlebox frontman Kevin Martin stated that it was inspired by two friends who overdosed on heroin and "represents the loss of love between friends and having to be left with the feeling of emptiness." He elaborated in a 2008 interview:

"I wrote 'Far Behind' for Andy Wood. I was a huge Malfunkshun fan and a huge Mother Love Bone fan and I got to know Andy early on in his career when I was working in a shoe store with Susan Silver who was managing Mother Love Bone, Soundgarden, and Alice in Chains."

== Appearances ==
The song was performed on Late Show with David Letterman amidst the promotion of Candlebox. During the 2000s, it has appeared on various 1990s compilation albums such as; MTV the First 1000 Years: Rock, Double Shot: Alt Rock, Essential Music Videos: '90s Rock, The Buzz, Buzz Ballads, and Whatever: The '90s Pop and Culture Box. The song can be heard on an episode of the HBO series Eastbound & Down when Kenny Powers goes to his friend's funeral while carrying a boombox on his shoulder. In the SyFy Channel's television show Alphas the song was played in season 2, episode 4. In Chile, the song was soundtrack soap opera of Canal 13 Las Vega's.

== Music video ==
The "Far Behind" video was directed by Nick Egan. It was filmed in a house near Green Lake in Seattle. The exterior shots were filmed at the now razed Elliott Farm in Renton, Washington and the video revolves mainly around the old farmhouse's now supposed inhabitants. Early on, Martin sings with a corded microphone while walking through the neglected structure. A cheerful young woman is also seen sitting at the edge of a grimy, near-empty outdoor pool. The chorus then has a man splashing red paint across the white walls. Various people are seen lying around the house including a lone, weary looking man in a bathtub who at one point appears to be defending himself from a drowning attempt. Song lyrics are scribbled along parts of the walls, and an American flag serves as a backdrop to certain shots. "Far Behind" aired heavily on MTV and was one of the most requested videos of 1994.

== Track list ==
1. Far Behind (album version) (4:58)
2. Far Behind/Voodoo Child (Slight Return) (live) (9:01)
3. You (live) (5:27)

== Charts ==
=== Weekly charts ===
Chart (1994)	Peak position
UK Singles (Official Charts)	93
UK Rock & Metal (Official Charts)	28
US Billboard Hot 100	18
US Alternative Airplay (Billboard)	7
US Mainstream Rock (Billboard)	4
US Pop Airplay (Billboard)	19
US Cash Box Top 100	37

=== Year-end charts ===
Chart (1994)	Position
US Album Rock Tracks (Billboard)	3
US Modern Rock Tracks (Billboard)	21

== Certifications ==
Region	Certification	Certified units/sales
New Zealand (RMNZ)	Gold	15,000^{‡}
^{‡} Sales+streaming figures based on certification alone.

== Release history ==
Release dates and formats for "Far Behind"
Region	Date	Format(s)	Label(s)	Ref.
United Kingdom	August 22, 1994	7-inch vinyl; CD; cassette	Maverick	
United States	August 1994	Cassette	Maverick	
Australia	September 26, 1994	CD; cassette	Maverick	
