= Happy Pills =

Studio album by Candlebox
- Released: July 21, 1998
- Recorded: 1997–1998
- Studio: Rumbo Recorders, The Record Plant
- Genre: Post-grunge
- Length: 56:08
- Label: Maverick
- Producer: Ron Nevison

Candlebox chronology
Lucy (1995)	Happy Pills (1998)	Into the Sun (2008)

Music video
- "10,000 Horses" on YouTube

Professional ratings
Review scores
Source	Rating
Allmusic	2.5/5 stars
Entertainment Weekly	C−
Wall of Sound	38/100

Happy Pills is the third studio album by Seattle rock band, Candlebox. It features former Pearl Jam drummer Dave Krusen who replaced Scott Mercado in 1997. Happy Pills did not gain the success of its predecessors and would be the last Candlebox album before their hiatus in 2000. It would also be the final Candlebox album recorded for Maverick.

Four of the album's tracks would be included on The Best of Candlebox in 2006.

The album was produced by the band and Ron Nevison, who had served as producer for Led Zeppelin, Ozzy Osbourne, Europe, Heart, Firehouse and many other artists.

== Background and recording ==
The band had asked their fans to submit concept cover art for their upcoming album. They originally promised the gold press CD for the 1st-place winner but after having trouble obtaining it, awarded a personalized platinum plaque.

Three songs were left unfinished from the Happy Pills recording sessions. These were intended to be completed for B-side release in 1999.

== Touring and promotion ==
Touring for Happy Pills began only after the album's recording and release. In a 2007 interview, frontman Kevin Martin expressed regret in this process, stating that the songs have been able to mature through the following years of live performances.

The band's concert schedule would face numerous defects. In mid-1998, Martin suffered a burst blood vessel in his throat, forcing the band to cancel some shows. Months later, they were asked to join Aerosmith on the 9th leg of their Nine Lives Tour in December. Krusen departed from Candlebox in January 1999 and was replaced by Shannon Larkin of Ugly Kid Joe. Bardi Martin also left for college and was replaced by Rob Redick, formerly of Dig.

"It's Alright" would be the album's lead single and chart well. A music video was filmed but after a negative response from the band, a second version was quickly shot in California on July 7.

== Track listing ==
1. "10,000 Horses" — 5:10
2. "Happy Pills" — 3:26
3. "Blinders" — 5:49
4. "It's Alright" — 5:23
5. "A Stone's Throw Away" — 5:41
6. "So Real" — 3:54
7. "Offerings" — 4:17
8. "Sometimes" — 5:08
9. "Step Back" — 4:30
10. "Belmore Place" — 4:02
11. "Breakaway" — 4:15
12. "Look What You've Done" — 4:33

== Chart positions ==
=== Singles ===
Year	Title	Peak Chart positions		
Year	Title	US Hot 100	US Modern Rock	US Mainstream Rock
1998	"It's Alright"	-	32	2
1998	"10,000 Horses"	-	-	13
1999	"Happy Pills"	-	-	17

== Personnel ==
=== Candlebox ===
- Kevin Martin – lead vocals
- Peter Klett – guitar
- Bardi Martin – bass
- Dave Krusen – drums
