= HTRK =

Australian music duo

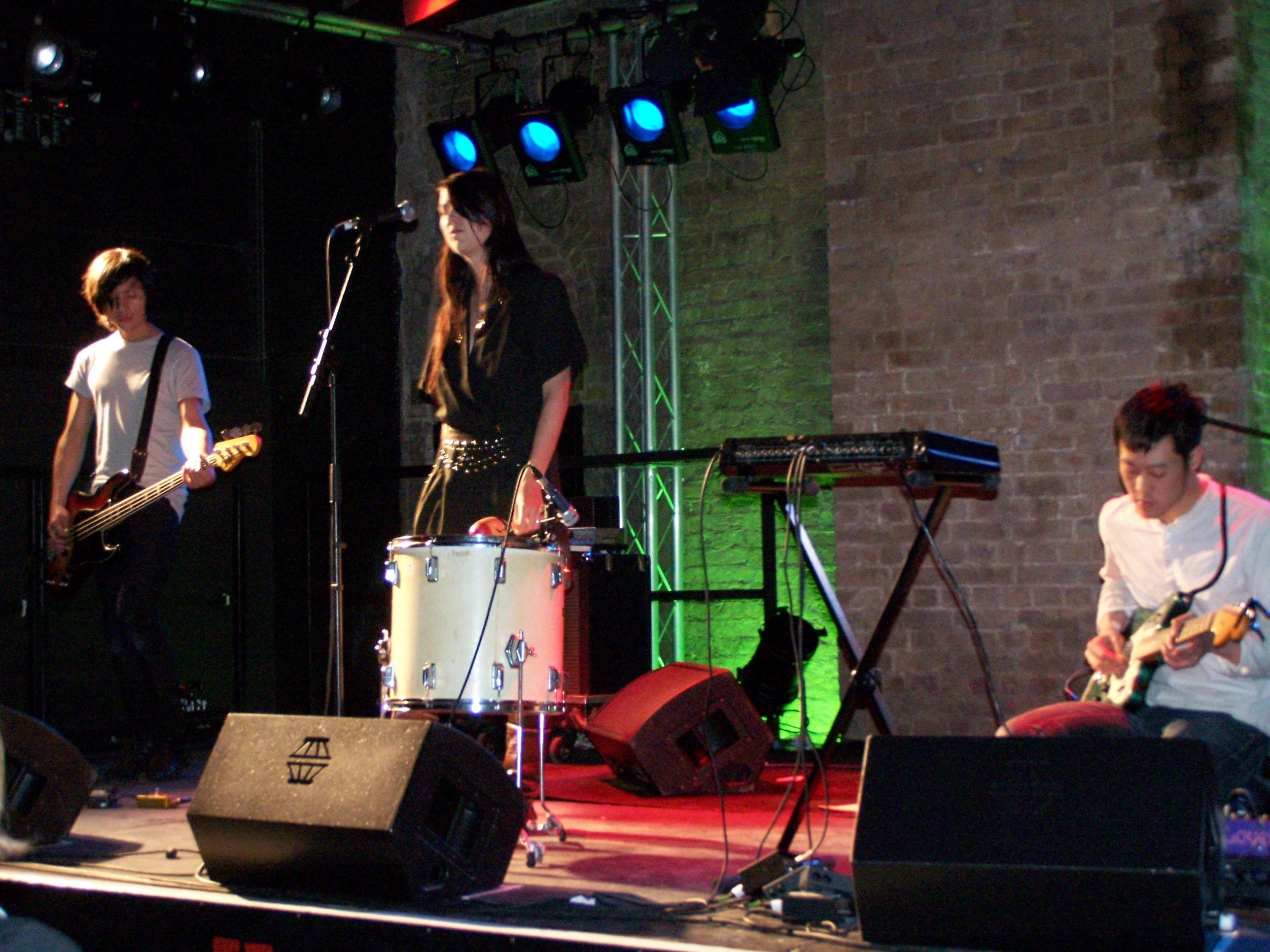
- HTRK performing in 2007: Sean Stewart, Jonnine Standish, Nigel Yang

Background information
- Also known as: Hate Rock Trio
- Origin: Melbourne, Victoria, Australia
- Genres: Experimental rock; cold wave; sadcore; electronic; post-punk
- Years active: 2003–present
- Labels: Fire; Blast First Petite; Ghostly
- Members: Jonnine Standish; Nigel Yang
- Past members: Sean Stewart

HTRK (pronounced "hate rock", formerly Hate Rock Trio) is an Australian band formed in 2003. The band is currently a duo of vocalist Jonnine Standish and guitarist Nigel Yang; bassist Sean Stewart was a member until his death in 2010.

The band's debut album was produced by Rowland S. Howard. The Guardian described their early work as "defined by aggressive, guitar-driven noise, which was matched in spirit by Standish’s haunted, brazenly sexual lyrics." Pitchfork noted how since Stewart's death, the band "shed the cold, industrial leanings of their earlier releases for a more overtly sensual approach, something that could soundtrack moments of intimacy or ennui, or both."

== Biography ==
=== Emergence ===
Originating from Melbourne, and previously based in Berlin and London, HTRK (pronounced Hate Rock) started playing in November 2003 when guitarist Nigel Yang and bassist Sean Stewart invited vocalist Jonnine Standish to create music inspired by the surrealistic films of David Lynch, along with protopunk and post-industrial ideas. Using a very slow 808 drum machine, minimal bass grooves and highly textured noise, their attitude clashed with the "rock and roll" status quo in Australia. HTRK's first release was the Nostalgia EP in 2004, originally intended as a demo but later self-released in a limited 500-disc run. That year, Standish designed the band's logo, which she said was "an overthrow of the iconic LOVE logo crossed with political propaganda angles and big corporation confidence."

Their live shows soon caught the attention of underground icon Rowland S. Howard and popular Australian producer Lindsay Gravina, who invited them to record their debut album at Gravina's Birdland Studios. Titled Marry Me Tonight and considered something of a pop effort by the band, the album was held in limbo for several years due to a protracted rights dispute. In August 2005, the band performed as a support act for Howard at the premiere party for Scott Crary's film, Kill Your Idols, in Melbourne.

=== Breakthrough ===
In 2006, a few months after recording Marry Me Tonight, the trio relocated to Berlin, toured with fellow expatriates Devastations and played their first UK gig at the 20jazzfunkgreats club in Brighton. Upon witnessing a show at the Brixton Windmill, UK label Fire Records signed HTRK to give Nostalgia a wider international release. A 27-date European tour supporting Liars and a performance at Glasgow's Optimo followed in 2007.

In 2008, they began to be managed by Paul Smith, who organised London shows with Lydia Lunch and Alan Vega. Stewart and Standish spent part of the year in Melbourne recording as guests on Howard's final album, Pop Crimes, including a duet by Howard and Standish, "(I Know) a Girl Called Jonny".

Marry Me Tonight was finally released in 2009 on Smith's independent label Blast First Petite, receiving critical favor from the UK press, scoring 8 out of 10 in NME, making Artrockers best of 2009 list and an office ambience listing in The Wire. Artist and former porn actress Sasha Grey also listed Marry Me Tonight in her top three albums in a Stereogum end-of-year poll.

That year, HTRK were invited by Yeah Yeah Yeahs, the Horrors and Fuck Buttons to embark on various European tours. Their increased profile led to a headline show at Cargo in London in January 2010, which coincided with the release of the first of a series of free mixtapes and appearances in US magazines Alternative Press and Nylon.

=== Re-organisation ===
On 18 March 2010, Stewart was found dead in his London home from suicide. NME published an obituary on 24 April 2010 with tributes from Yeah Yeah Yeahs' Nick Zinner and the Horrors' Faris Badwan.

Standish and Yang have remained active, beginning with a comeback show at the ICA in London on 29 November 2010. The band's second album Work (Work, Work) was released on 12 September 2011. Standish contrasted it to the band's debut by saying, "In our first album Marry Me Tonight I was the predator and instigator of my own destiny... primal and dominatrix at the same time. In our latest album Work (Work, Work) I’m overcome by my desires and play a submissive and subversive role. I went under, got swallowed up, gave in, let go." It was released on Ghostly International.

The duo's third album, Psychic 9–5 Club, was the first that Stewart did not work on in any fashion. It was released on 1 April 2014 and produced by Nathan Corbin. At the Music Victoria Awards of 2014, Psychic 9–5 Club was nominated for best album.

Since 2016, Standish has been based in the Dandenong Ranges, east of Melbourne, where the band also has a studio.

HTRK's fourth album Venus in Leo was released in 2019. It was recorded live in a few takes and features lyrics by Standish about the "different people that you run into in your life randomly, and the incredible effect they can have." It contains a cover of Missy Elliott's 1998 single "Hit Em wit da Hee". The band's fifth album Rhinestones was released in September 2021. It was their first to chart in Australia (at number 58). Pitchfork compared the album to a "subterranean Everything But the Girl" and observed that they traded "their minimal-wave roots for unexpected forays into gothic country."

In 2023, the band signed with New York based firm SemaphoreMGMT. In 2024, HTRK played the Primavera Sound festival in Barcelona for the first time, one of several Australian acts.

== Collaborations ==
The band has collaborated with New York-based film maker Nathan Corbin, (Bendin', Chinatown Style, Venus in Leo) and costume designer and wardrobe stylist Jenni Hensler, who has done styling for Standish and who also worked on the 2014 video for the song "Chinatown Style."

== Reception ==
The band is associated with the Ghostly International record label. Thursday vocalist Geoff Rickly, Sacred Bones Records founder Caleb Braatan and Crushed vocalist Bre Morell all named a HTRK album (most commonly Psychic 9-5 Club) as the label's best release.

== Members ==
- Jonnine Standish – vocals, percussion, samples
- Nigel Yang – guitar, programming, electronics

Former members

- Sean Stewart – bass guitar, programming (2003–2010; his death)

== Discography ==
=== Studio albums ===
Title	Details	Peak chart positions
Title	Details	AUS
Marry Me Tonight	Released: 2 February 2009; Formats: CD, digital download; Label: Blast First Petite (PTYT 016)	—
Work (Work, Work)	Released: 2011; Formats: CD, digital download, LP; Label: Mistletone (MIST047)	—
Psychic 9–5 Club	Released: 2014; Formats: CD, digital download, LP; Label: Mistletone (MIST066)	—
Venus in Leo	Released: 2019; Formats: CD, digital download, LP; Label: Ghostly International (GI342CD)	—
Over the Rainbow	Released: 2019; Formats: digital download, LP; Label: Boomkat Editions (BKEDIT019)	—
Rhinestones	Released: 17 September 2021; Formats: CD, digital download; Label: Ghostly International	58

=== Compilations ===
Title	Details
Tape for Sean	Released: 18 March 2020; Formats: Cassette; Label: HTRK; Limited edition
Rarities	Released: 20 March 2020; Formats: digital download; Label: HTRK
String of Hearts (Songs of HTRK)	Released: 05 December 2025; Formats: Cassette, digital download; Label: Ghostly International

=== EPs ===
Title	Details
Nostalgia	Released: 2004; Formats: CD, digital download; Label: HTRK
Live At Corsica Studios London 2008	Released: 2011; Formats: digital download, LP; Label: JSMЁ Records (JSE 05)
Body Lotion	Released: 2014; Formats: digital download, LP; Label: HTRK
Drama	Released: 2018; Formats: digital download, LP; Label: HTRK (HTRK002)

== Awards and nominations ==
=== Music Victoria Awards ===
The Music Victoria Awards are an annual awards night celebrating Victorian music. They commenced in 2006.

Year	Nominee / work	Award	Result	Ref.
Music Victoria Awards of 2014	Psychic 9-5 Club	Best Album	Nominated	
