= Scott Mercado =

American drummer

- Instrument: Drums

Scott Mercado is the original drummer of Sky Cries Mary and co-founder of the Seattle rock group Candlebox, a band reunited in 2006 with a "Best of" CD, live DVD (Alive in Seattle, 2007), and a latest CD called Into the Sun, released January 2008. With over 5 million CDs sold, Candlebox continues to tour and record around the United States and the world. Mercado has also performed with Johnny Graham (Earth, Wind & Fire), Living Colour, Brandi Carlile. Known for his blend of jazz drumming elements in rock and roll and use of the open-handed drumming technique. Voted best Up and Coming drummer in Modern Drummer magazine.

== Discography ==
=== With Candlebox ===
- Candlebox (1993)
- Lucy (1995)
- The Best of Candlebox (2006)
- Into The Sun (2008)
- Alive In Seattle (2008)

=== With Brandi Carlile ===
- We're Growing Up (2003)
