= King's Royal (TV serial) =

British television serial

King's Royal was an eighteen-episode British TV drama, based on the 1976 novel by John Quigley. It was shown on the UK television channel BBC One for two seasons in 1982–83, starring Tom Bell as Fergus King, a self-made whisky magnate who struggles to keep his empire together during the late Victorian era. Eric Deacon played the part of his son, Robert King who connives to gain control of the business.
