= John Quigley (author) =

Scottish author (1925–2021)

John Quigley (1925 – 28 September 2021) was a Scottish author known for his historical novel King's Royal (1975) about the invention of blended whisky in mid-nineteenth century Glasgow. A 1983 BBC television serial was based on the novel.

Quigley died on 28 September 2021, at the age of 95.
