= Magnog =

American space rock/post-rock band

- Origin: Edmonds, Washington, United States
- Genres: Post-rock, space rock
- Labels: Kranky
- Past members: Phil Drake; Jeff Reilly; Dana Shinn

Magnog was an American space rock/post-rock band, initially active in the mid-to-late 1990s, then returning to live performances in 2011.

== Biography ==
The origins of Magnog are in band Space Helmet, which essentially split up into Magnog and Hovercraft, c. 1993. (Magnog's drummer and Hovercraft's guitarist are brothers.) Magnog's lineup consisted of Jeff Reilly (bass, guitar), Dana Shinn (drums), and Phil Drake (guitar), with all three also singing and playing keyboards. After sending three ninety-minute demo tapes of lengthy improvised jams, recorded between 1994 and 1997, to Kranky, the trio recorded an album for the label with Jessamine's Andy Brown as producer. The eponymous album was released in 1996, drawing comparisons with early 1970s Pink Floyd and 1970s German Krautrock bands such as Ash Ra Tempel and early Tangerine Dream.

The following year, tracks from the demo tapes were selected for release as the double CD More Weather. The band went on to play the Vienna Jazz Festival and performed with Pearl Jam and Neil Young for the Pearl Jam fan club in Seattle. After the band broke up, Reilly made further records as Octal, including an album for Space Age Recordings, the label Spacemen 3 are signed to.

Magnog returned to live activity with shows in the Pacific Northwest in 2011.

Phil Drake died on November 8, 2015.

== Discography ==
=== Albums ===
- Magnog – CD/2xLP (1996, Kranky) (double LP has 11 mins. of extra music)
- More Weather – 2xCD (1997, Kranky)
