= Dave Krusen =

American musician (born 1966)

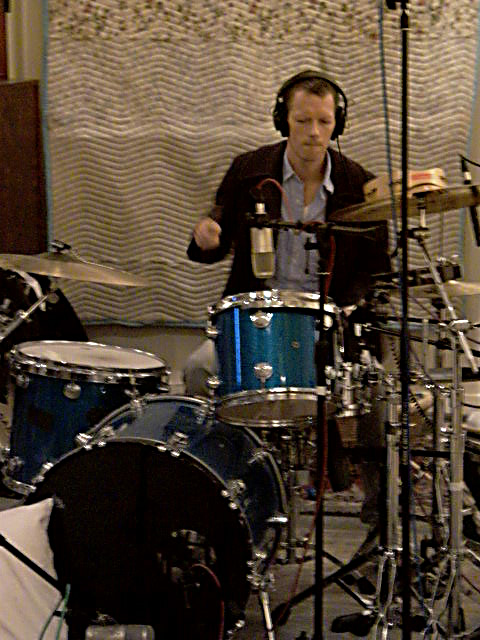
- Krusen in 2008

Background information
- Also known as: Karl 3‒30
- Born: David Karl Krusen; March 10, 1966 (age 60); Tacoma, Washington, U.S.
- Genres: Alternative rock, grunge, hard rock, post-grunge
- Occupation: Musician
- Instrument: Drums
- Years active: 1979–present
- Labels: Epic, Mute, Warner, Universal, Wax Orchard

David Karl Krusen (born March 10, 1966) is an American musician. Krusen is best known as the first drummer for the American rock band Pearl Jam and for his work on the band's debut album, Ten. Krusen was also a member of the bands Hovercraft and Unified Theory. He was also the drummer for Candlebox from 1997 to 1999 and from 2015 to 2017.

Krusen was inducted into the Rock and Roll Hall of Fame as a member of Pearl Jam on April 7, 2017.

== Biography ==
=== Early life ===
Krusen was born in Tacoma, Washington and grew up in the town of Gig Harbor along with his two brothers and sister. He was into Elvis Presley and Chuck Berry when he was young, and later got into The Beatles, Led Zeppelin, The Rolling Stones, The Who, The Police, and Neil Young. Krusen began playing locally in the Seattle area in 1979 while he was in high school. His first band, Outrigger, was formed with his friends from high school. Throughout the 1980s, Krusen had several stints playing with Seattle area musical acts, including Boibs, Agent Boy, Gary Williams, Tramps of Panic, Liar's Club, Hard Time, and WarmDrive.

=== Pearl Jam ===
Krusen was recruited in 1990 by bassist Jeff Ament and guitarist Stone Gossard to be the drummer for Pearl Jam. Krusen was asked to join Pearl Jam after auditioning with the band. Krusen played with Pearl Jam through to the completion of the band's debut album, Ten, in 1991. After the recording sessions for Ten were completed, Krusen left Pearl Jam in May 1991 and checked himself into rehabilitation. According to Krusen, he was suffering from personal problems at the time, including alcoholism. Krusen said, "It was a great experience. I felt from the beginning of that band that it was something special," and added, "They had to let me go. I couldn't stop drinking, and it was causing problems. They gave me many chances, but I couldn't get it together." Vocalist Eddie Vedder said, "Krusen was a real hero...He was going through a lot, but he had something really special." Krusen was replaced by Matt Chamberlain.

On May 16, 2022, at the Fresno, California, show of Gigaton Tour, Krusen played with Pearl Jam for the second time since leaving the band (the first being Pearl Jam’s Rock & Roll Hall of Fame induction).

=== Hovercraft ===
In the mid-1990s, Krusen joined Beth Liebling and Ryan Shinn in the band Hovercraft under the stage name "Karl 3‒30". Krusen replaced previous drummer Bobby Tamkin. With a more technically proficient drummer, the band was now free to play beyond the lo-fidelity noise experiments of its debut release, and play proper shows with structured improvisation and avant experimentalism. While a member of Hovercraft Krusen toured with the band and recorded the album Akathisia (1997).

=== Diamond Star Halo ===
In 1994 Krusen co-founded Diamond Star Halo with former Candlebox bass player Aaron Seravo. The two were introduced by a mutual friend and discovered they had exactly the same vision for a band. The band was completed by Singer Bo Bligh and bassist Steve Martin the band released their first record in 1995 tilted In The Rough on Regal Recordings. The album was produced by Cristopher Thorne of Blind Melon and Kevin Martin of Candlebox & was mixed by Kelly Grey. The band enjoyed moderate success but not to the level of their former bands Candlebox and Pearl Jam. After much conflict centering on singer Bo Bligh's drug addictions the band dissolved. There was a later version of the band reformed by Seravo in 2000. Aaron Seravo died of cancer January 9, 2011, surrounded by friends and loved ones, at Stanford University Hospital. Steve Martin died very early in 2011 as well (committing suicide) a few days before Seravo's passing.

=== Candlebox ===
Krusen was the second drummer for Candlebox, replacing previous drummer Scott Mercado. Krusen joined in 1997 and recorded the album Happy Pills (1998) while as a member of the band. Krusen left the band in 1999 and was replaced by Shannon Larkin of Ugly Kid Joe. Krusen completed eight tracks on the Candlebox record, Into the Sun, which was released in July 2008 and nine tracks on the latest Candlebox record, Love Stories & Other Musings, which was released in April 2012. As of 2015 he has rejoined the band.

=== Unified Theory ===
Krusen played drums with the band Unified Theory on its self-titled album, issued in August 2000. The band was made up of two ex-Blind Melon members (bassist Brad Smith and guitarist Christopher Thorn) and newcomer Chris Shinn on vocals/guitar. Unified Theory began to form in early 1998. After the first plan to carry on Blind Melon with a new singer didn't work out, Smith and Thorn decided to start a new band and came across vocalist Chris Shinn after moving to Los Angeles. Krusen was already friends with Thorn and Smith. While working on tracks for a second album, delays set the band back, and Krusen grew somewhat frustrated and left. This eventually led to Unified Theory's break-up.

=== The Hung White Ponies ===
Krusen played drums with The Hung White Ponies which also included Rick Rosas on bass, Ryan Kralik on guitar and vocals and Michael G. Ronstadt on Cello. Formed in 2011 by Ryan Kralik, the band released the album No Agenda in 2011 along with a cover single of CSNY's Neil Young penned classic protest tune Ohio which also featured Iraq War vet Josh Hisle. In 2012 the concept audio/film album CRAZYTOWN A Visual Music Album was released as both an audio album and a feature film. In 2013, after a west-coast tour, the band released the live concert CD/DVD The Hung White Ponies Live at the High Dive which documented one of the tours Seattle, WA concerts. Krusen is credited as co-producer on many of the Hung White Ponies releases.

== Other musical projects ==
After leaving Pearl Jam, Krusen teamed up with former Son of Man vocalist Tal Goettling, bass player Matt McClinton, and guitarist Tim Bethune to form the short-lived but highly acclaimed Purple Decade. The band recorded two demo tapes before imploding under the pressures of the Seattle and Los Angeles music scenes. In 2004, Krusen performed with musician Shawn Snyder as part of his backing band. He was a part of a Seattle, Washington-based band called Novatone which released the album Time Can't Wait in 2005. He was Cheyenne Kimball's drummer from 2005 to 2007 and played on her debut album, The Day Has Come (2006). He is currently working on a blues/noise-groove, avant-garde record and performing live and in the studio with various artists including Martyr Reef, Toy Robot, George Stanford, Lowlight, Jesse Cole, Foster Timms, Matthias Sturm, La La Birdtime, Dave Giles, Shelby, Carolyna Loveless, Chris Robinson, Puppies and Kittens and John Pringle. He is now touring with Ida Maria and recording her third album due out in 2012.

== Equipment ==
Krusen currently plays Paiste cymbals, DW, Gretsch, Yamaha and C&C Drums, Remo drum heads, and Vater drumsticks, preferring the SD9 in wood tip.

== Personal life ==
Krusen resides near Los Angeles with his wife and two children.

== Discography ==
=== Pearl Jam discography ===
Year	Title	Label	Track(s)
1991	Ten	Epic	All
1993	In Defense of Animals	Restless	"Porch"
1999	Rock: Train Kept a Rollin' (Also part of the box set, Sony Music 100 Years: Soundtrack for a Century.)	Sony	"Black"
2003	Lost Dogs	Sony	"Alone", "Hold On", "Yellow Ledbetter", "Brother"
2004	rearviewmirror	Sony	"Once", "Alive", "Jeremy", "Black", and "Yellow Ledbetter"
2009	Ten (Reissue)	Legacy	All

=== Diamond Star Halo discography ===
Year	Title	Label
1995	In the Rough	Regal Recordings

=== Hovercraft discography ===
Year	Title	Label
1997	Akathisia	Mute

=== Candlebox discography ===
Year	Title	Label	Track(s)
1998	Happy Pills	Warner Bros.	All
2006	The Best of Candlebox	Rhino/WEA	"Happy Pills", "It's Alright", "Sometimes", "10,000 Horses", and "Glowing Soul"
2008	Into the Sun	Silent Majority Group/ILG	All except " @#!*% Brewin", "Underneath it All", "Lover Come Back to Me", and "Consider Us"
2012	Love Stories & Other Musings	Audionest/Fontana/Universal	First Nine Songs

=== Unified Theory discography ===
Year	Title	Label
1999	Luma	Self-released
2000	Unified Theory	Universal
2007	Cinematic	Wishbone

=== Novatone discography ===
Year	Title	Label
2005	Time Can't Wait	Wax Orchard

=== Hung White Ponies discography ===
Year	Title	Label
2011	No Agenda	Anatomy Music Group
2011	Ohio (single)	Anatomy Music Group
2012	CRAZYTOWN A Visual Music Album	Anatomy Multimedia
2013	The Hung White Ponies Live at the High Dive	Anatomy Music Group
2014	Aint No Saint (single)	Anatomy Music Group

=== Contributions and collaborations ===
Year	Group	Title	Label	Track(s)
1998	Caustic Resin	The Medicine Is All Gone	Alias	Some
2002	Carrie Akre	Invitation	My Way	All
2005	Thee Heavenly Music Association	Shaping the Invisible	Rehash	Some
2006	Cheyenne Kimball	The Day Has Come	Epic	"Good Go Bad", "Everything to Lose", and "Didn't I"
2008	Shawn Smith	The Diamond Hand	Sound Vs. Silence	"Toss It in the Fire", "The White Queen", and "For Everyone to See"
2012	Joon Wolfsberg	Wonderland	Cow Universe Music	All
