= The Best of Candlebox =

Greatest hits album by Candlebox
- Released: May 23, 2006
- Recorded: 1992–1998
- Genre: Alternative rock, post-grunge
- Length: 68:09
- Label: Rhino / WEA

Candlebox chronology
Happy Pills (1998)	The Best of Candlebox (2006)	Into the Sun (2008)

Professional ratings
Review scores
Source	Rating
AllMusic	3.5/5 stars

The Best of Candlebox is a greatest hits album by the Seattle rock band Candlebox, released on May 23, 2006. The album contains songs from the band's first three albums, as well as the song "Glowing Soul," from the soundtrack to The Waterboy.

Candlebox was contacted upon the decision by WEA to release a best-of compilation. This prompted their reuniting after a seven-year hiatus and a tour in support of the compilation. Shortly after, Candlebox recorded their first studio album in ten years, Into the Sun.

== Track listing ==
1. "You" – 4:57 from Candlebox
2. "Blossom" – 4:31 from Candlebox
3. "Understanding" – 4:47 from Lucy
4. "Simple Lessons" – 2:53 from Lucy
5. "Best Friend" – 3:27 from Lucy
6. "Arrow" – 3:13 from Candlebox
7. "Happy Pills" – 3:26 from Happy Pills
8. "Far Behind" – 4:59 from Candlebox
9. "Change" – 6:24 from Candlebox
10. "Lucy" – 4:45 from Lucy
11. "Cover Me" – 4:45 from Candlebox
12. "It's Alright" – 5:24 from Happy Pills
13. "Sometimes" – 5:09 from Happy Pills
14. "10,000 Horses" – 5:10 from Happy Pills
15. "Glowing Soul" – 4:19 from The Waterboy soundtrack
