= Beth Liebling =

American musician

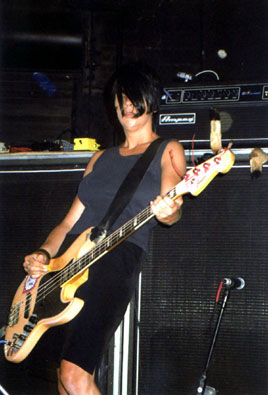
- Liebling performing in 1995

Background information
- Born: March 12, 1967 (age 59)
- Origin: Chicago, Illinois, U.S.
- Genres: Experimental rock; noise rock; post-rock; space rock
- Instruments: Bass guitar, drums
- Years active: 1993–present
- Labels: Blast First; Mute Records; Repellent
- Member of: Teleportal
- Formerly of: Hovercraft; Space Helmet
- Spouse: Eddie Vedder (m. 1994; div. 2000)

Beth Liebling (born March 12, 1967) is an American musician who co-founded the Seattle-based experimental instrumental group Hovercraft with guitarist/keyboardist/samplist Ryan Campbell ("Campbell 2000"). She played bass for the band under the stage name Sadie 7. Since 2015, Liebling has been the bassist of the band Teleportal.

== Career ==
Liebling first became interested in playing while, as a teenager, attending all ages hardcore punk shows in Chicago such as Articles of Faith and the Dead Kennedys. After high school, Liebling moved to San Diego, where she attended San Diego State University. She graduated with a degree in journalism in 1990. While attending classes at San Diego State University, Liebling booked shows on campus and commuted on weekends to Los Angeles, where she had an internship at Virgin Records. Liebling and her then-boyfriend Eddie Vedder would help promote Red Tape, a weekly gothic-rock gathering at Winter's, a local SDSU hangout.

Prior to forming the trio Hovercraft, Liebling and Ryan Campbell had played together in Space Helmet, which formed when Liebling moved to Seattle. Space Helmet broke up when Campbell moved to New York City and the other members of Space Helmet, including Campbell's brother, formed the band Magnog. Ryan Campbell's departure for New York was short and upon his return, Hovercraft was formed and continued to record until 1999.

=== Hovercraft and other projects ===
Hovercraft, who had been included in the grunge music documentary Hype! (1996), had existed for four years before they released their first and only 7" single, "0,0,0,1," (1995). The band worked together with Bobby Tamkin of MOTO SOLO, The Warlocks, Kerosene 454, Xu Xu Fang, on and off for years before taking a serious turn as a real band. Drums on early recordings were provided by Bobby Tamkin, using the name "Paul 4" (not Eddie Vedder, under the name "Jerome230", as initially reported). Hovercraft's first tour of the United States was as the opening act for the Foo Fighters and Mike Watt. Vedder initially began the tour but was replaced after a few performances by Bobby Tamkin. The band later found a new drummer, Dave Krusen, a.k.a. Karl 3-30, who had been the drummer on Pearl Jam's record "Ten". With Krusen they recorded Stereo Specific Polymerization on their own label, Repellent Records. In 1997 they were signed by Daniel and Paul Smith to London-based Mute Records. In America, they were represented by "Mute Records America". They released Akathisia in 1997 and Experiment Below in 1998. Hovercraft toured the United States a few times on their own, and in Europe with Unwound. Hovercraft also collaborated on the project Schema with Stereolab's Mary Hansen, releasing an album in 2000.

After Hovercraft ended around 2000, Liebling took a brief hiatus from music. She later sat in on sessions with various groups in Los Angeles, including playing drums in the Los Angeles-based group Lola.

=== Teleportal (2015–present) ===
In 2015, Liebling joined the band Teleportal playing bass and doing backing vocals, along with former Hovercraft bandmates James Bourland on guitar and Ric Peterson on drums. The band also features Johnny Rossa on lead vocals. The band released their first album, Devour, on October 18, 2019.

== Personal life ==
Liebling began dating Eddie Vedder in 1983, and the couple married in 1994 in Rome, Italy. They divorced in September 2000. In an interview published in the June 29, 2006, edition of Rolling Stone magazine, Vedder said that his divorce from Liebling had devastated him.
