= Paul Smith (music industry executive) =

British music manager

Paul Smith is best known as the founder and manager of Blast First, the British alternative record label that released artists such as Sonic Youth, the Butthole Surfers, Big Black and Dinosaur Jr. in the UK. He continued to manage the artists and work in the music industry when Blast First was bought by Mute Records. Now he runs the very small label "Blast First Petite" on which he develops and sometime releases stuff that was refused by Mute's Blast First, including Rivulets and HTRK. He now has an exclusive contract with Pan Sonic. In 2002 he produced a multimedia performance event at the Barbican to mark the release of Iain Sinclair's book London Orbital. The event featured a diverse range of artists from the literary and music worlds including J. G. Ballard and Bill Drummond.

Paul Smith also produced the final British tour of Ken Kesey, taking him on a bus tour around festivals in summer 1997. He is also known for King Mob, a record label of spoken word performances by famous counter-culture authors from the Beat Generation to Iain Sinclair and Stewart Home.
