= Candlebox (album) =

Studio album by Candlebox
- Released: July 20, 1993
- Recorded: March–April 1993 at London Bridge, Seattle, Washington. "Far Behind" & "You" recorded April 1992 at Robert Lang.
- Genres: Grunge; post-grunge
- Length: 53:21
- Labels: Maverick; Warner Bros.
- Producers: Candlebox; Kelly Gray

Candlebox chronology
Candlebox (1993)	Lucy (1995)

Singles from Candlebox
- 1. "Change" Released: July 1993; 2. "You" Released: November 30, 1993; 3. "Far Behind" Released: August 22, 1994; 4. "Cover Me" Released: November 11, 1994

Candlebox is the debut album by Seattle rock band Candlebox. It contains their best known hit, "Far Behind", as well as the hit singles "Change", "You" and "Cover Me". Released in 1993, the album has since been certified 4× platinum in the United States.

== Promotion ==
The music videos for "Change", "Far Behind", "You" and "Cover Me" remained in longstanding rotation on MTV and the latter became two of the most requested videos of 1993, and the former being featured on Beavis and Butt-Head.

Other songs were recorded during the Candlebox sessions and included on other releases. "Can't Give In," for instance, appears on the Airheads film soundtrack. "Pull Away" also served as a B-side to the "You" CD single.

== Reception ==
Professional ratings
Review scores
Source	Rating
AllMusic	4/5 stars
The Philadelphia Inquirer	2/4 stars
The Village Voice	C

The album has received mixed reviews. In a review for The Village Voice, although he gave the album a C rating, Robert Christgau panned the album and called the band "postgrunge scenesuckers [who] aren't total pop-metal conformists—they're a tad more intense, with sharper drumming." The Philadelphia Inquirer concluded that "underneath all that flannel there's a Ritchie Blackmore's Rainbow cover band just biding its time." Trouser Press opined: "Much as Bon Jovi put a net on hair metal, Candlebox's primary function was to put a final stamp of megaselling irrelevance on the rotten corpse of Big Northwest Noise."

Stephen Thomas Erlewine was more positive, writing for AllMusic: "Candlebox rode the alternative bandwagon to the top of the charts with their self-titled debut album." He also calls the singles "Change", "You" and "Far Behind" "the closest they come to memorable melodies."

Although released in July 1993, Candlebox did not enter the top 10 Billboard 200 until August 1994, upon the success of its third and biggest single "Far Behind", which would reach number 18 on the Hot 100 chart roughly a month later. The album peaked at number seven, Candlebox's highest position so far, and remained on the chart for 104 weeks.

In 2025, Lauryn Schaffner of Loudwire named the album the best post-grunge release of 1993. That same year, she said it was the band's best album.

== Track listing ==
All tracks by Candlebox.

No.	Title	Length
1.	"Don't You"	3:12
2.	"Change"	6:24
3.	"You"	4:56
4.	"No Sense"	4:49
5.	"Far Behind"	4:59
6.	"Blossom"	4:30
7.	"Arrow"	3:13
8.	"Rain"	6:58
9.	"Mothers Dream"	4:31
10.	"Cover Me"	4:46
11.	"He Calls Home"	5:03
Total length:		53:21

== Personnel ==
=== Band ===
- Kevin Martin - lead vocals
- Peter Klett - guitar
- Bardi Martin - bass
- Scott Mercado - drums

=== Other ===
- Candlebox – producer, mixing
- Kelly Gray – producer, engineer, mixing
- Scott Heard – backing vocals
- Randy Gane – Hammond organ
- Janet Levinson – art direction
- Laurie Lewis – backing vocals
- Jon Plum – producer, engineer
- Kevin Westenberg – photography

== Charts ==
=== Weekly charts ===
Chart (1993–94)	Peak position
US Billboard 200	7
US Heatseekers Albums (Billboard)	1

=== Year-end charts ===
Chart (1994)	Position
US Billboard 200	26
Chart (1995)	Position
US Billboard 200	55

== Certifications ==
Region	Certification	Certified units/sales
Canada (Music Canada)	Gold	50,000^{^}
United States (RIAA)	4× Platinum	4,000,000^{^}
^{^} Shipments figures based on certification alone.
