= Sean Hennesy =

American guitarist

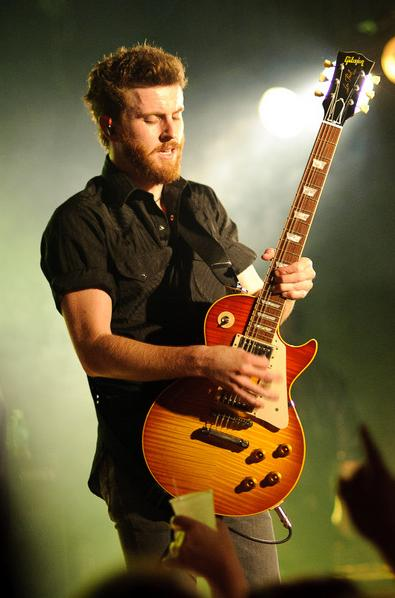
- Hennesy with The Gracious Few in 2010

Background information
- Instrument: Guitar

Sean Robert Hennesy is a guitarist for the bands Candlebox, Royal Bliss, and The Gracious Few. He has previously played for the bands The Hiwatts and The Kings Royal.

== History ==
Hennesy joined a reunited Candlebox in 2006 on rhythm guitar. He joined The Gracious Few on lead guitar after Live guitarist Chad Taylor claimed that he did not want to play solos and lead singer Kevin Martin suggested that his Candlebox bandmate would be able to do the job. In July 2014 he joined Royal Bliss as the second guitarist. In 2015, he left the band shortly after lead guitarist Peter Klett and drummer Scott Mercado left to focus on solo projects.

In a 2010 interview, Hennesy described his style of guitar playing as, "A high-cut karate sound that cuts through," which he felt would be well suited to accompany Taylor's "Big, fat, manly beast" guitar sound."

On March 12, 2012, Hennesy played with three of his Gracious Few bandmates in Live when they unveiled Chris Shinn as their new lead singer at a concert in York, Pennsylvania.

== Discography ==
=== With The Gracious Few ===
- The Gracious Few (2010)

=== With Candlebox ===
- Love Stories & Other Musings (2012)
