= Candlebox =

American rock band

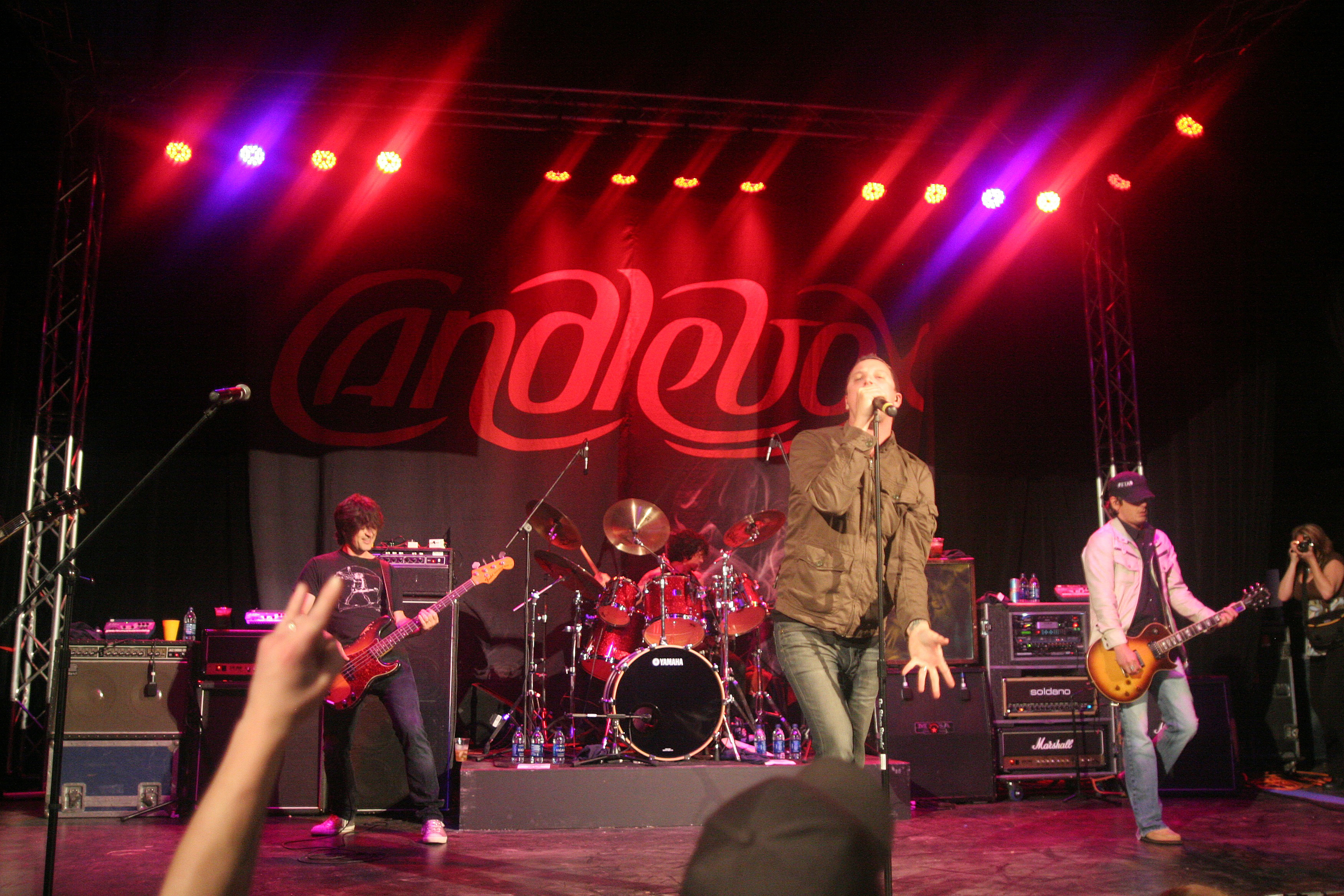
- Candlebox in 2009

Background information
- Origin: Seattle, Washington
- Genres: Grunge; hard rock; alternative rock; post-grunge
- Works: Discography
- Years active: 1990–2000; 2006–present
- Labels: Maverick; Audionest; Pavement Entertainment; Fontana
- Members: Kevin Martin; Peter Klett; Adam Kury; Island Styles; BJ Kerwin
- Past members: Scott Mercado; Bardi Martin; Robbie Allen; Shannon Larkin; Rob Redick; Mike Leslie; Sean Hennesy; Robin Diaz; Brian Quinn; Dave Krusen
- Website: www.candleboxrocks.com

Candlebox is an American rock band from Seattle, Washington. Since its formation in 1990, the group has released eight studio albums, several charting singles, a compilation, and a CD+DVD.

Candlebox found immediate success with the release of its self-titled debut album in July 1993. Candlebox featured four singles: "Change", "You", "Far Behind" and "Cover Me". "Far Behind" reached the top 20, and the album was certified quadruple platinum by the RIAA. The band's next album, Lucy (1995), was certified gold, and was followed three years later by Happy Pills (1998). After troubles with its record company, Candlebox broke up in 2000. The band reunited in 2006 and they have since released five more studio albums: Into the Sun (2008), Love Stories & Other Musings (2012) Disappearing in Airports (2016), Wolves (2021), and their most recent album The Long Goodbye released on August 25, 2023.

Lauryn Schaffner at 106.3 The Buzz considers Candlebox one of the "Big Four" of post-grunge.

== History ==
=== Early career (1990–1992) ===
Formed in 1990, Candlebox originally consisted of lead singer Kevin Martin, guitarist Peter Klett, bassist Bardi Martin, and drummer Scott Mercado. The band's name was derived from a lyric in the 1982 Midnight Oil song "Tin Legs and Tin Mines" ("...boxed in like candles").

=== Rise to fame (1993–2000) ===
Candlebox began performing live in 1991. By 1992 the band was playing regularly in some of Seattle's top clubs (including RKCNDY and Farside) to ever increasing audiences.

The band's eight-song EP gained the attention of Maverick Records, with whom the band signed. Candlebox was the first successful act on Maverick Records, which went on to sign Alanis Morissette, Deftones and The Prodigy.

On July 20, 1993, Candlebox released its self-titled debut album. It sold more than four million copies and peaked at No. 7 on Billboard's album charts. Candlebox featured the hit singles "Change", "You", "Far Behind", and "Cover Me". "Far Behind" entered Billboard's top 20 in July 1993, peaked at No. 18, and stayed on the charts until January 1994. The tremendous radio, concert, and television success gained Candlebox an opening slot for Rush on their Counterparts tour and Metallica on their Shit Hits the Sheds Tour, as well as a main-stage slot at Woodstock '94. They also played with bands like Living Colour, The Offspring, Aerosmith, Radiohead and The Flaming Lips, and by the end of 1994, the band had graduated to headlining their own tours. In addition, Candlebox won Metal Edge magazine's 1994 Readers' Choice Award for Best New Band.

Hot off the success of Candlebox, the band was eager to progress and by April 1994 had 36 new songs for a follow-up record. On October 3, 1995, Candlebox released its second album, Lucy. Although it marked the beginning of the band's decline in popularity, Lucy was certified gold thanks to singles such as "Simple Lessons" and "Understanding". Two days after the release of Lucy, Candlebox appeared on Working Class Hero: A Tribute to John Lennon with its cover of "Steel and Glass". After spending the remainder of 1995 and most of 1996 touring behind Lucy (including playing with bands like Our Lady Peace, Sponge, Seaweed, Foo Fighters, Everclear and Stabbing Westward), Scott Mercado left the band in 1997 and was replaced by original Pearl Jam drummer Dave Krusen.

On July 21, 1998, Candlebox released its third studio album, Happy Pills. While a return to the simpler sound of its debut, it gained only marginal success. The song "Glowing Soul" was also recorded for the soundtrack to The Waterboy and included at the request of Adam Sandler. Inspired by the film, the song was based on a Bo Diddley rhythm and recorded with vintage equipment.

Krusen departed from Candlebox in 1999 and was replaced by Shannon Larkin of Ugly Kid Joe. Bardi Martin left to attend college and was replaced by Rob Redick, formerly of Dig. By 2000, Candlebox disbanded. According to Martin, the band was unhappy with its record contract and attempted to be freed from Maverick after two years by breaking up. The former Candlebox members would pursue other musical endeavors during the 2000s.

=== Reunion and continued work (2006–2022) ===
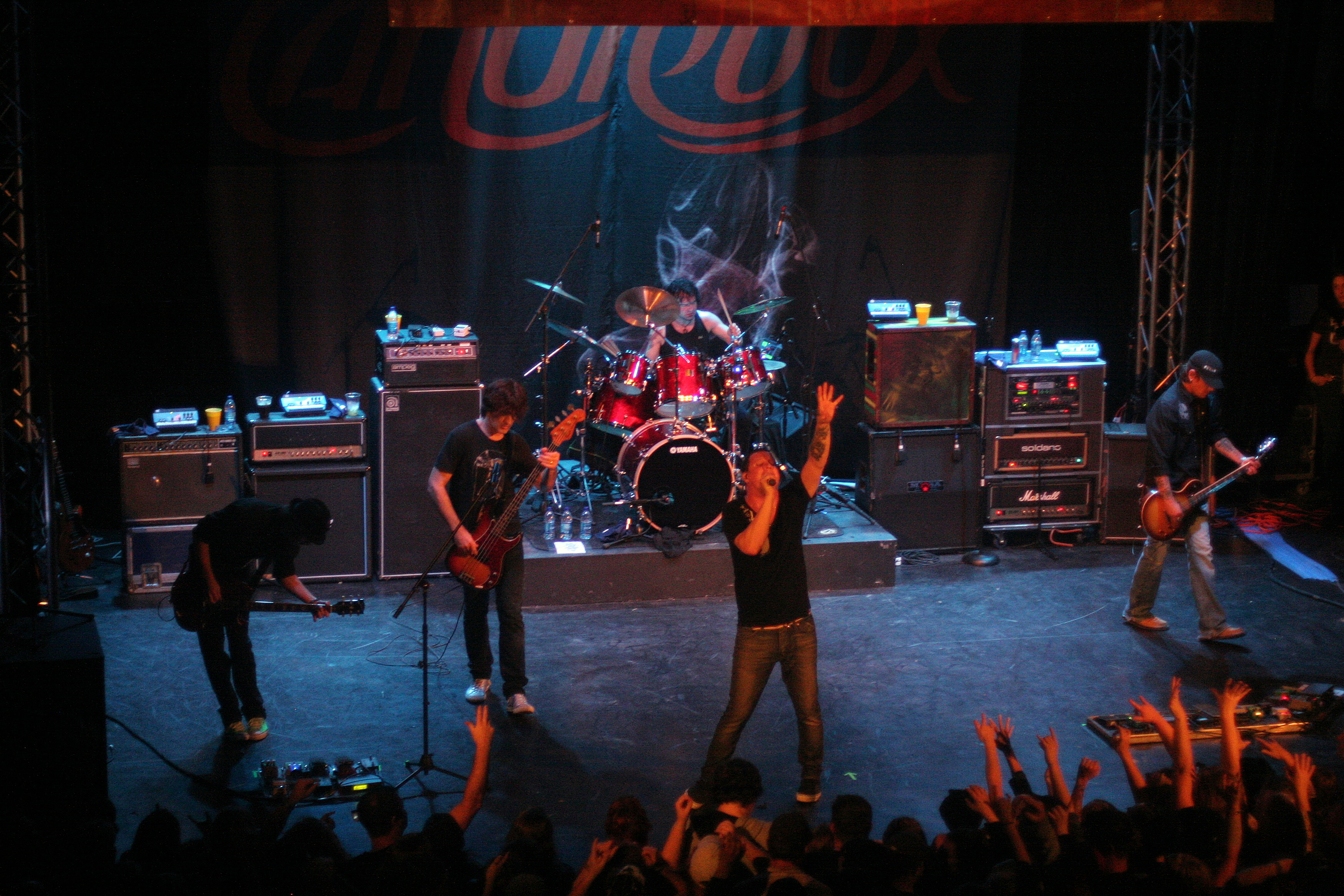
Candlebox in 2009 in Aberdeen, WA.

In 2006, Rhino Records planned to release a "Best of" compilation of Candlebox, which prompted the original band lineup to reunite for the first time in nearly 10 years (with Sean Hennesy on rhythm guitar). To promote the compilation, Candlebox embarked on a three-month North American tour from July to October of that year. Bardi Martin left the band in 2007 to continue his education to become a lawyer, with Adam Kury as his replacement. During the time, the band would begin writing new material despite having no record label.

After several delays, Candlebox released its first album in 10 years, Into the Sun, on July 22 via Silent Majority/ILG records. The album was produced by Ron Aniello (Lifehouse, Barenaked Ladies) and features performances by both Scott Mercado and Dave Krusen on drums. The first single, "Stand", was released to radio in mid-May and Candlebox officially commenced touring in support of the new record in June 2008. "Stand" reached as high as No. 15 on the U.S. Mainstream Rock chart.

On July 4, 2008 Candlebox performed at the O'Fallon, Missouri Heritage and Freedom Fest in front of a record crowd. Two months later, the band released a live CD/DVD called Alive in Seattle.

On August 9, 2010, Candlebox kicked off a five-show stint overseas performing for U.S. troops at Camp Arifjan in Kuwait and continued on to Iraq.

In 2010, Peter Klett and Scott Mercado formed Lotus Crush, consisting of: Terry McDermott (lead vocals), Peter Klett (lead guitar), Johnny Bacolas (bass), Scott Mercado (drums), and John Luzzi (rhythm guitar).

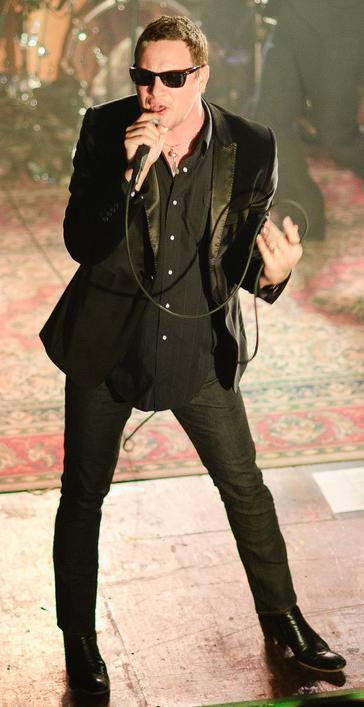
Kevin Martin in 2010

On April 3, 2012 Candlebox released its fifth studio album, Love Stories & Other Musings produced by Ken Andrews (Failure/Thousand Foot Krutch/Lostprophets).

Although the band had planned to put out a new album in 2015, those plans were postponed after Candlebox parted ways with its record label at the time. In 2015, founding members Scott Mercado and Peter Klett announced that they were leaving the band to focus on Lotus Crush; the split was amicable. Sean Hennesy left the band shortly thereafter. Former drummer Dave Krusen rejoined the band, and new members Mike Leslie (lead guitar) and Brian Quinn (rhythm guitar) also joined.

It was announced in August 2015 that Candlebox had inked a record deal through Pavement Music and that the band was working on a new record for an early 2016 release. The album, titled Disappearing in Airports, was released on April 22, 2016.

Island Styles and former Daughtry drummer Robin Diaz joined Candlebox in late 2016 for its second live album, "Disappearing Live".

In July 2018, the original Candlebox lineup had a one-off reunion for the two live shows in Seattle, performing the band's debut album in its entirety to celebrate the 25th anniversary of its release.

Candlebox's first studio album in five years, Wolves, was released on September 17, 2021. The album was preceded six months earlier by its lead single "My Weakness".

=== The Long Goodbye Tour & album, tour with Bush and hiatus (2023–2025) ===
On June 8, 2023, the band announced on an Instagram livestream their final album entitled The Long Goodbye would be released in August 2023 and will be supported by the band's (at the time) final tour, The Long Goodbye Tour.

On October 11, 2023, Candlebox frontman Kevin Martin announced via the band's YouTube channel that the band would extend The Long Goodbye Tour into 2024, performing in its first ever Australian Tour.

Candlebox announced on January 16, 2024 that they would be opening for Bush's summer 2024 Loaded: The Greatest Hits tour along with Jerry Cantrell.

On February 12, 2025, the group announced via social media that original guitarist Peter Klett was rejoining after a 9 year absence. They revealed that guitarist Brian Quinn would be leaving as a result, but called him a "crucial part" of the band's activities in the past decade. "We can't wait to see what the future holds with Peter back in the fold," they wrote. "Stay tuned for what's to come – this is just the beginning!"

=== Comeback tour and upcoming ninth upcoming album (2026–present) ===
In January 2026, frontman Kevin Martin confirmed that, nearly three years after announcing a final album and tour, Candlebox had been working on new material for their upcoming ninth studio album and had plans to tour into 2027. In July 2026, The Mountain Goats released a new song entitled "Candlebox", in which a fictional band is offered the opportunity to tour with the titular band. Shortly thereafter, The Mountain Goats were announced as an opener for two shows on Candlebox's Can't Quit You North American tour; The Verve Pipe, Sponge, Sweet Water and American Blonde were also announced as openers.

== Musical style ==
Candlebox's musical style, while predominantly hard rock, has a wide range of influences. Some of the band's songs have strong references to blues, grunge, rock and glam metal. Despite various aforementioned classic roots, the band's music is considered contemporary.

They cited influences including Pearl Jam, Alice in Chains, Soundgarden, the Melvins, Nirvana, Mudhoney, Green River, Jane's Addiction, Red Hot Chili Peppers, Danzig, Black Sabbath, the Doors, Slade, Led Zeppelin and Otis Redding.

== Members ==
=== Current line-up ===
- Kevin Martin – lead vocals, additional guitar (1990–2000, 2006–present)
- Peter Klett – lead guitar, backing vocals (1990–2000, 2006–2015, 2025–present) (Note: One-off reunions 2018, 2021, 2024)
- Adam Kury – bass, backing vocals (2007–present)
- Island Styles – rhythm guitar, backing vocals (2016–present)
- BJ Kerwin – drums (2021–present)

=== Former members ===
- Scott Mercado – drums (1990–1997, 2006–2015) (Note: One-off reunions 2018, 2021)
- Bardi Martin – bass, backing vocals (1990–1999, 2006–2007) (Note: One-off reunions 2012, 2018, 2021)
- Dave Krusen – drums (1997–1999, 2015–2016) (Note: Session work 2008, 2012, 2021)
- Robbie Allen – rhythm guitar (1998–2000)
- Shannon Larkin – drums (1999–2000)
- Rob Redick – bass (1999–2000)
- Sean Hennesy – rhythm guitar (2006–2015) (Note: One-off reunion 2021)
- Mike Leslie – lead guitar (2015–2016)
- Robin Diaz – drums (2016–2021)
- Brian Quinn – rhythm guitar, lead guitar, backing vocals (2015–2025) (Note: Played rhythm guitar until 2016 and then switched to lead guitar until 2025)

== Discography ==
=== Studio albums ===
Title	Album details	Peak chart positions		Sales	Certifications
Title	Album details	US	US Ind.	Sales	Certifications
Candlebox	Released: July 20, 1993; Label: Warner Bros., Maverick; Formats: CD, cassette, LP	7	—	US: 3,844,596+	RIAA: 4× Platinum; MC: Gold
Lucy	Released: October 3, 1995; Label: Maverick; Formats: CD, cassette, LP	11	—	US: 466,059+	RIAA: Gold
Happy Pills	Released: July 21, 1998; Label: Maverick; Formats: CD, cassette	65	—	US: 224,492+	
Into the Sun	Released: July 22, 2008; Label: Silent Majority Group; Formats: CD	32	4		
Love Stories & Other Musings	Released: April 3, 2012; Label: Audionest; Formats: CD, LP	82	12		
Disappearing in Airports	Released: April 22, 2016; Label: Pavement Music; Formats: CD, LP, digital download	112	—		
Wolves	Released: September 17, 2021; Label: Pavement Music; Formats: CD, LP, digital download	—	—		
The Long Goodbye	Released: August 25, 2023; Label: Pavement Music; Formats: CD, LP, digital download	—	—		

=== Compilation albums ===
- The Best of Candlebox (May 23, 2006)

=== Live albums ===
- Alive in Seattle CD+DVD (September 2, 2008)
- Disappearing Live CD (April 8, 2017)
- Live at The Neptune CD (June 23, 2023)

=== Other recordings ===
- "Pull Away" – CD single B-side for "You" (1993)
- "Far Behind/Voodoo Child" (Slight Return) [Live Medley] – CD single B-side for "Far Behind" (1994)
- "Can't Give In" – Airheads Soundtrack (1994)
- "Featherweight" – CD single B-side for "Simple Lessons" (1995)
- "Steel and Glass" – Working Class Hero: A Tribute to John Lennon (1995)
- "Glowing Soul" – The Waterboy Soundtrack (1998)
- "The Answer" – iTunes exclusive bonus track from Into the Sun (2008)

=== Singles ===
Year	Song	Peak chart positions			Album
Year	Song	US	US Alt.	US Main.	Album
1993	"Change"	—	—	18	Candlebox
1994	"You"	78	—	6	Candlebox
1994	"Far Behind"	18	7	4	Candlebox
1994	"Cover Me"	—	23	8	Candlebox
1995	"Simple Lessons"	60	12	5	Lucy
1995	"Understanding"	—	—	19	Lucy
1995	"Best Friend"	—	—	—	Lucy
1998	"It's Alright"	—	32	2	Happy Pills
1998	"10,000 Horses"	—	—	13	Happy Pills
1999	"Happy Pills"	—	—	17	Happy Pills
2008	"Stand"	—	—	15	Into the Sun
2008	"Miss You"	—	—	—	Into the Sun
2009	"A Kiss Before"	—	—	—	Into the Sun
2012	"Believe in It"	—	—	—	Love Stories & Other Musings
2016	"Vexatious"	—	—	33	Disappearing in Airports
2020	"Let Me Down Easy"	—	—	—	Wolves
2021	"My Weakness"	—	—	—	Wolves
2023	"Punks"	—	—	—	The Long Goodbye
2023	"What Do You Need?"	—	—	—	The Long Goodbye

=== Music videos ===
- "Change"
- "You"
- "Far Behind"
- "Cover Me"
- "Simple Lessons"
- "Understanding"
- "Best Friend"
- "It's Alright"
- "Stand"
- "Miss You"
- "Vexatious"
- "Supernova"
- "All Down Hill From Here"
- "Riptide"
- "This Time Tomorrow 14"
- "Punks"

== See also ==
- List of alternative rock artists
- List of musicians from Seattle
- List of post-grunge bands
