= Adam Kury =

American bassist and vocalist

- Born: July 7, 1967 (age 59); Montrose, Scotland, U.K.
- Instruments: Bass, Guitar, Vocals

Adam Kury (born July 7, 1967) is an American bassist and vocalist. He is best known as the bassist for the American alternative rock band Candlebox. Based in Los Angeles, California, he has been the bassist for Candlebox since the band reunited in 2008.

Kury was born in Montrose, Scotland, and was raised all over the world as a Navy brat, living in Scotland, Thailand, Germany, Maryland, Alaska, and Hawaii. He performs and records with many artists in Los Angeles and around the world., including bands such as The Hiwatts, The Kings Royal, Le Projet, Angels in Vein, Last December, Legs Diamond, and is also currently a member of Los Angeles–based Sons of Silver. Adam is also known for occasional mixing and producing as well.

== Sources ==
- Adam Kury
- Yahoo! Movies - Adam Kury
- Legs Diamond
