= Talking Heads discography =

Cataloging of published recordings by Talking Heads

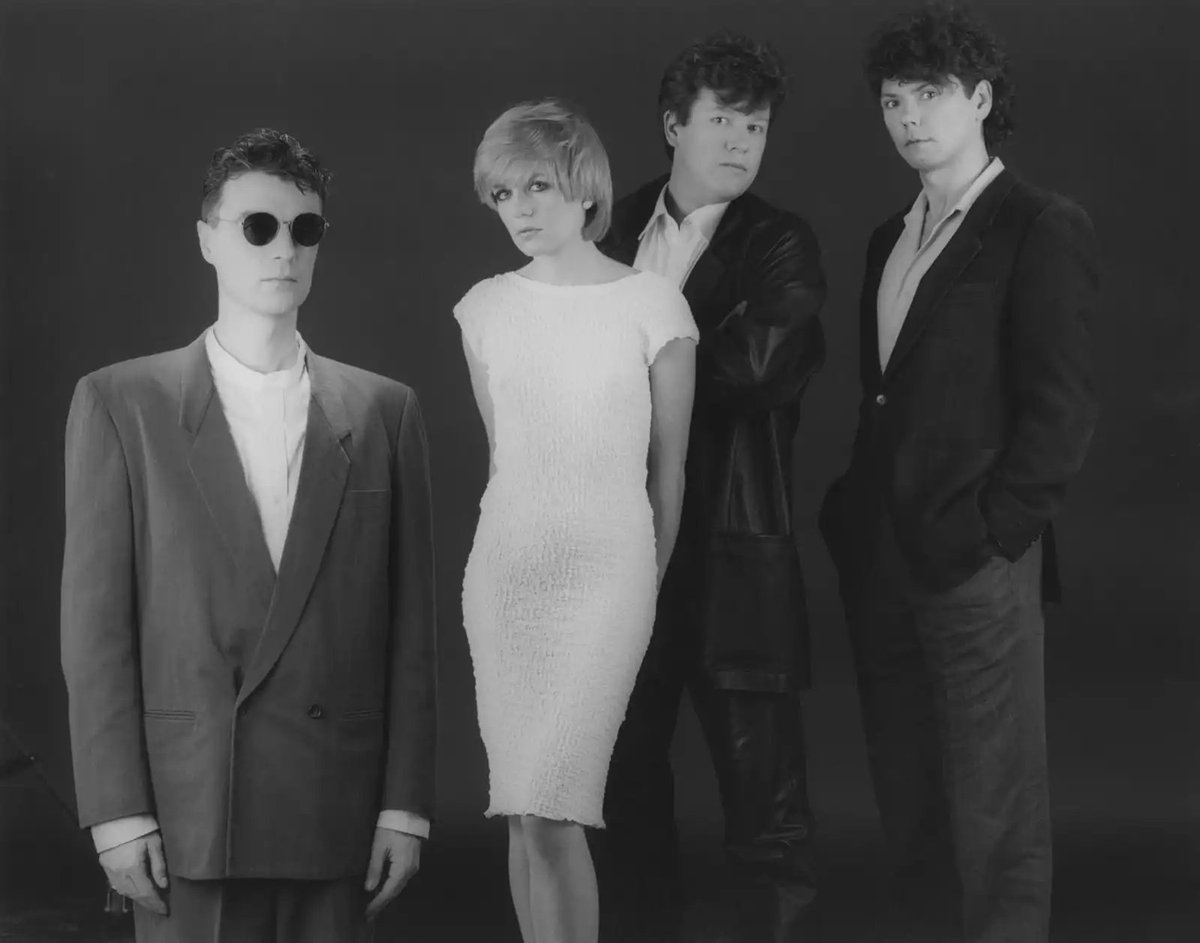
- Talking Heads in a publicity photo, 1985
- Studio albums: 8
- Live albums: 4
- Compilation albums: 8
- Singles: 31
- Video albums: 4
- Music videos: 16
- Remix albums: 1

The discography of American rock band Talking Heads consists of eight studio albums, four live albums, ten compilation albums, one remix album, four video albums, 31 singles, and 15 music videos.

== Albums ==
=== Studio albums ===
List of studio albums, with selected chart positions and certifications
Title	Album details	Peak chart positions										Certifications
Title	Album details	US	AUS	AUT	CAN	NLD	NOR	NZ	SWE	SWI	UK	Certifications
Talking Heads: 77	Released: September 16, 1977 (US); Label: Sire; Formats: LP	97	—	—	—	—	—	21	—	—	60	BPI: Silver
More Songs About Buildings and Food	Released: July 14, 1978 (US); Label: Sire; Formats: LP, 8-track	29	46	—	42	—	—	4	—	—	21	RIAA: Gold; BPI: Gold
Fear of Music	Released: August 3, 1979 (US); Label: Sire; Formats: Cassette, LP	21	35	—	27	—	—	11	—	—	33	RIAA: Gold; BPI: Silver
Remain in Light	Released: October 8, 1980 (US); Label: Sire; Formats: Cassette, LP	19	25	—	6	22	26	8	28	—	21	RIAA: Gold; BPI: Gold; MC: Gold
Speaking in Tongues	Released: June 1, 1983 (US); Label: Sire; Formats: CD, cassette, LP	15	15	20	7	14	11	3	12	—	21	RIAA: Platinum; BPI: Gold; MC: Platinum
Little Creatures	Released: June 10, 1985 (US); Label: Sire, EMI; Formats: CD, cassette, LP	20	2	4	18	4	16	1	10	12	10	RIAA: 2× Platinum; BPI: Gold
True Stories	Released: September 15, 1986 (US); Label: Sire, EMI; Formats: CD, cassette, LP	17	2	10	16	16	13	1	5	11	7	RIAA: Gold; BPI: Gold
Naked	Released: March 15, 1988 (US); Label: Sire, EMI; Formats: CD, cassette, LP	19	8	8	13	13	7	7	9	6	3	RIAA: Gold; BPI: Gold
"—" denotes a recording that did not chart or was not released in that territory.

=== Live albums ===
List of live albums, with selected chart positions and certifications
Title	Album details	Peak chart positions									Certifications
Title	Album details	US	AUS	AUT	CAN	NLD	NZ	SWE	SWI	UK	Certifications
The Name of This Band Is Talking Heads	Released: March 24, 1982 (US); Label: Sire; Formats: LP box set	31	41	—	—	38	7	32	—	22	
Stop Making Sense	Released: September 12, 1984 (US); Label: Sire, EMI; Formats: CD, cassette, LP	41	9	12	33	2	2	26	13	24	RIAA: 2× Platinum; BPI: Gold
Live at WCOZ 77	Released: April 20, 2024 (US); Label: Sire, Rhino; Formats: LP	—	—	—	—	—	—	—	—	—	
Live on Tour '78	Released: April 12, 2025 (US); Label: Rhino; Formats: CD, LP	192	—	—	—	—	—	—	—	—	
"—" denotes a recording that did not chart or was not released in that territory.

=== Compilation albums ===
List of compilation albums, with selected chart positions and certifications
Title	Album details	Peak chart positions							Certifications
Title	Album details	US	AUS	BEL	CAN	NLD	NZ	UK	Certifications
Once in a Lifetime: The Best of Talking Heads	Released: October 12, 1992 (UK); Label: EMI; Formats: CD, LP	—	35	—	—	66	3	7 (Note: Once in a Lifetime – The Best of Talking Heads and Sand in the Vaseline: Popular Favorites charted as a double album set in the United Kingdom.)	BPI: Gold
Popular Favorites 1976–1992: Sand in the Vaseline	Released: October 12, 1992 (UK); Label: Sire, EMI; Formats: CD box set, LP box set	158	—	—	52	—	37	7	BPI: Gold
Once in a Lifetime	Released: November 11, 2003 (US); Label: Sire, Warner Bros.; Formats: CD box set	—	—	—	—	—	—	—	
The Best of Talking Heads	Released: August 17, 2004 (US); Label: Sire, Warner Bros., Rhino; Formats: CD, 2LP, digital download	—	87	96	—	—	—	30	BPI: Platinum
Talking Heads	Released: October 4, 2005 (US); Label: Sire, Warner Bros., Rhino; Formats: DualDisc	—	—	—	—	—	—	—	
Bonus Rarities and Outtakes	Released: February 28, 2006 (US); Label: Sire, Warner Bros., Rhino; Formats: Digital download	—	—	—	—	—	—	—	
The Collection	Released: January 15, 2007 (US); Label: EMI; Formats: CD	—	—	—	—	—	—	—	
Same as It Ever Was	Released: 2009 (US); Label: Rhino; Formats: CD, digital download	73	—	—	—	—	—	—	
Essential	Released: August 23, 2011; Label: EMI; Formats: CD	—	—	—	—	—	—	—	BPI: Gold
Tentative Decisions: Demos & Live	Released: November 28, 2025; Label: Sire, Rhino; Formats: LP	—	—	—	—	—	—	—	
The Name of This Band Member is Tina	Released: October 7, 2026; Label: Warner Records LLC; Formats:	—	—	—	—	—	—	—	
The Name of This Band Member is Jerry	Released: October 14, 2026; Label: Warner Records LLC; Formats:	—	—	—	—	—	—	—	
The Name of This Band Member is David	Released: October 21, 2026; Label: Warner Records LLC; Formats:	—	—	—	—	—	—	—	
The Name of This Band Member is Chris	Released: October 28, 2026; Label: Warner Records LLC; Formats:	—	—	—	—	—	—	—	
"—" denotes a recording that did not chart or was not released in that territory.

=== Remix albums ===
List of remix albums
Title	Album details
12 × 12 Original Remixes	Released: August 2, 1999 (UK); Label: EMI; Formats: CD

=== Video albums ===
List of video albums, with selected chart positions
Title	Album details	Peak chart positions
Title	Album details	US Video
Stop Making Sense	Released: 1984; Label: RCA/Columbia Pictures Home Video; Formats: VHS, Laserdisc, DVD (1999), Blu-ray (2009)	
True Stories	Released: 1987; Label: Warner Home Video, The Criterion Collection; Formats: VHS, Laserdisc, DVD (1999), Blu-ray (2018)	
Storytelling Giant	Released: 1988 (US); Label: Warner Reprise Video, Picture Music International; Formats: VHS, Laserdisc, DVD (2003)	7
Chronology	Released: 2011; Label: Eagle Vision; Formats: DVD, Deluxe Edition DVD	

== Singles ==
List of singles, with selected chart positions, showing year released and album name
Title	Year	Peak chart positions										Certifications	Album
Title	Year	US	US Dance	US Main. Rock	AUS	CAN	GER	IRL	NLD	NZ	UK	Certifications	Album
"Love → Building on Fire"	1977	—	—	—	—	—	—	—	—	—	—		Non-album single
"Uh-Oh, Love Comes to Town" (US/CAN only)	1977	—	—	—	—	—	—	—	—	—	—		Talking Heads: 77
"New Feeling" (AUS only)	1977	—	—	—	—	—	—	—	—	—	—		Talking Heads: 77
"Psycho Killer"	1978	92	—	—	—	—	—	—	13	—	—	BPI: Platinum; RMNZ: 3× Platinum; RIAA: 2x Platinum	Talking Heads: 77
"First Week/Last Week... Carefree / Uh-oh, Love Comes to Town" (NED only)	1978	—	—	—	—	—	—	—	—	—	—		Talking Heads: 77
"Pulled Up" (UK only)	1978	—	—	—	—	—	—	—	—	—	—		Talking Heads: 77
"Take Me to the River"	1978	26	—	—	58	34	—	—	—	20	—	RMNZ: Platinum	More Songs About Buildings and Food
"Life During Wartime"	1979	80	—	—	—	—	—	—	—	—	—	RIAA: Gold	Fear of Music
"I Zimbra"	1980	—	28	—	—	—	—	—	—	—	—		Fear of Music
"Cities"	1980	—	—	—	—	—	—	—	—	—	—		Fear of Music
"Crosseyed and Painless"	1980	—	20 (Note: "Crosseyed and Painless", "Once in a Lifetime" and the album cut "Born Under Punches (The Heat Goes On)" charted together on the Hot Dance Club Play chart.)	—	—	—	—	—	—	—	—		Remain in Light
"Once in a Lifetime"	1981	— (Note: "Once in a Lifetime" did not enter the Billboard Hot 100, but peaked at number 3 on the Bubbling Under Hot 100 Singles chart.)	20	—	23	28	—	16	24	—	14	BPI: Platinum; RMNZ: Platinum	Remain in Light
"Houses in Motion"	1981	—	—	—	—	—	—	26	—	—	50		Remain in Light
"Life During Wartime" (live)	1982	—	—	—	—	—	—	—	—	—	—		The Name of This Band Is Talking Heads
"Burning Down the House"	1983	9	2 (Note: All tracks from Speaking in Tongues charted jointly on the Hot Dance Club Play chart.)	6	94	8	—	—	—	5	—	RMNZ: Platinum	Speaking in Tongues
"This Must Be the Place (Naive Melody)"	1983	62	2	—	—	—	—	—	—	—	51	BPI: Platinum; RMNZ: 2× Platinum	Speaking in Tongues
"Slippery People" (live)	1984	—	—	—	—	—	—	—	4	—	68		Stop Making Sense
"Girlfriend Is Better" (live)	1984	—	—	—	59	—	—	—	—	21	99		Stop Making Sense
"The Lady Don't Mind"	1985	—	—	—	24	—	42	24	15	8	81		Little Creatures
"Road to Nowhere"	1985	— (Note: "Road to Nowhere" did not enter the Billboard Hot 100, but peaked at number 5 on the Bubbling Under Hot 100 Singles chart.)	—	25	16	51	6	6	10	5	6	BPI: Gold; RMNZ: Platinum	Little Creatures
"And She Was"	1985	54	33 (Note: "And She Was" and the album cut "Television Man" charted together on the Hot Dance Club Play chart.)	11	10	—	53	9	31	16	17	RMNZ: Platinum	Little Creatures
"Stay Up Late"	1985	—	—	24	—	—	—	—	—	—	—		Little Creatures
"Once in a Lifetime" (live)	1985	91	—	—	—	—	—	—	22	15	—		Stop Making Sense
"This Must Be the Place (Naive Melody)" (live)	1986	—	—	—	—	—	—	—	—	—	100		Stop Making Sense
"Wild Wild Life"	1986	25	—	4	13	66	40	9	42	2	43		True Stories
"Love for Sale"	1986	—	—	—	—	—	—	—	—	—	—		True Stories
"Hey Now"	1986	—	—	—	65	—	—	—	—	45	—		True Stories
"Puzzlin' Evidence"	1986	—	—	19	—	—	—	—	—	—	—		True Stories
"Radio Head"	1987	—	—	—	—	—	—	23	—	—	52		True Stories
"Blind"	1988	—	—	39	—	—	—	—	—	—	59		Naked
"(Nothing But) Flowers"	1988	—	—	5	—	—	—	—	—	—	79		Naked
"Sax and Violins"	1991	—	—	49	—	—	—	—	—	—	—		Until the End of the World soundtrack
"Lifetime Piling Up"	1992	—	—	—	108	—	—	—	—	—	50		Sand in the Vaseline: Popular Favorites
"—" denotes a recording that did not chart or was not released in that territory.

== Music videos ==
List of music videos, showing year released and directors
Title	Year	Director(s)
"Once in a Lifetime"	1981	Toni Basil, David Byrne
"Crosseyed and Painless"	1981	Toni Basil
"Burning Down the House"	1983	David Byrne
"This Must Be the Place (Naive Melody)"	1983	David Byrne
"Slippery People"	1984	Jonathan Demme
"Road to Nowhere"	1985	David Byrne, Stephen R. Johnson
"The Lady Don't Mind"	1985	Jim Jarmusch
"And She Was"	1985	Jim Blashfield
"Stay Up Late"	1986	Ted Bafaloukos
"Wild Wild Life"	1986	David Byrne
"Love for Sale"	1986	David Byrne, Melvin Sokolsky
"(Nothing But) Flowers"	1988	Tibor Kalman, Sandy MacLeod
"Blind"	1988	Annabel Jankel, Rocky Morton
"Sax and Violins"	1991	Wim Wenders
"Lifetime Piling Up"	1992	—N/a
"Psycho Killer"	2025	Mike Mills
