= List of songs recorded by Talking Heads =

Songs recorded by Talking Heads

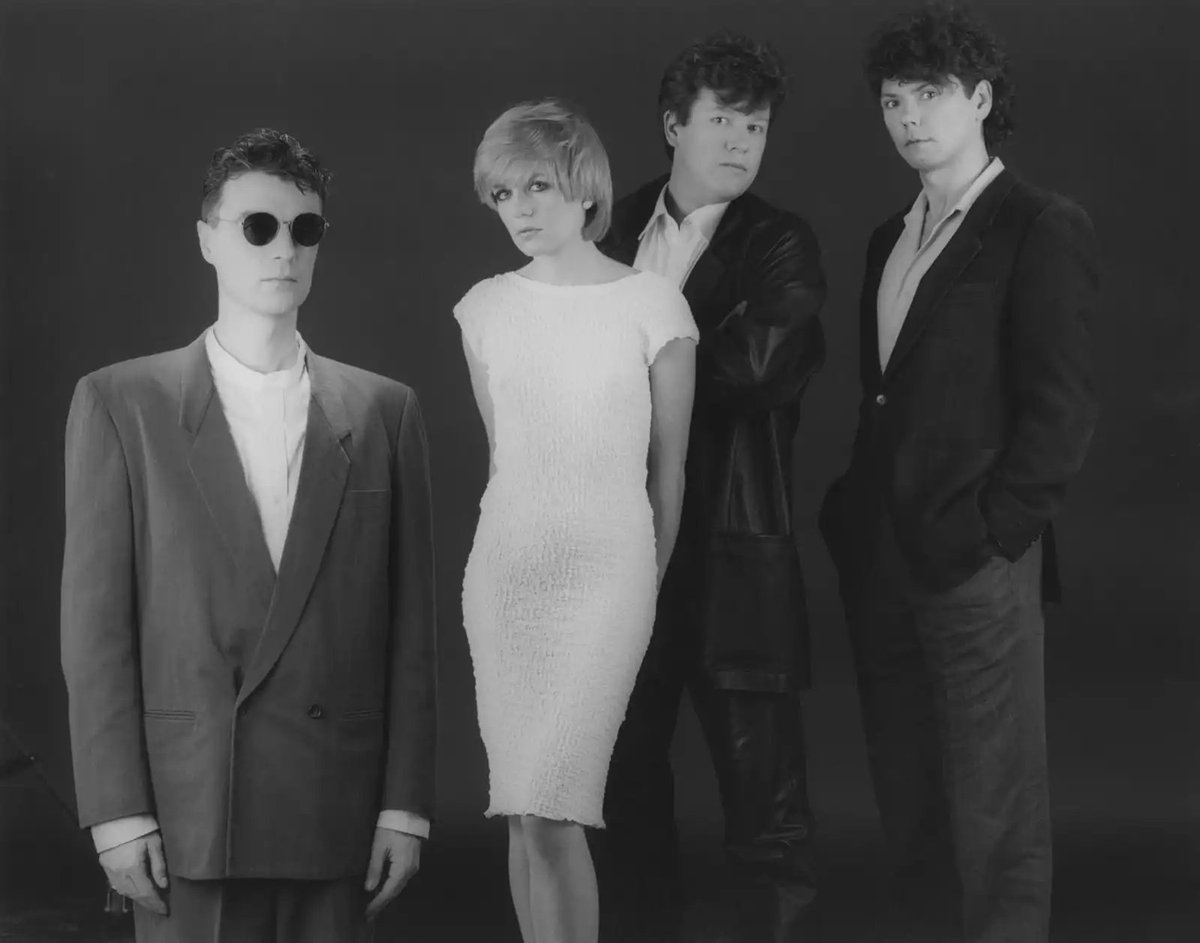
Talking Heads in 1985. L–R: David Byrne, Tina Weymouth, Chris Frantz, and Jerry Harrison.

Talking Heads were an American new wave band who, between 1975 and 1991, recorded 96 songs, 12 of which were not officially released until after their break-up. The group has been described as "one of the most acclaimed bands of the post-punk era" by AllMusic and among the most "adventurous" bands in rock history by the Rock and Roll Hall of Fame.

After leaving art school, Talking Heads released their debut single, "Love → Building on Fire", in early 1977, followed by their debut album, Talking Heads: 77, later that year. The album contained "stripped down rock & roll" songs and was notable for its "odd guitar-tunings and rhythmic, single note patterns" and its "non-rhyming, non-linear lyrics". While initially not a big hit, the album was aided by the single "Psycho Killer". The band's follow-up, More Songs About Buildings and Food (1978), began the band's string of collaborations with producer Brian Eno. Its songs are characterized as more polished than its predecessor, emphasizing experimentation and the rhythm section, as well as the genres of art pop and funk. The experimentation continued on Fear of Music (1979), in which the band began utilizing African-styled polyrhythms, most notably on the album's opening track "I Zimbra". The style and sound of Fear of Music was expanded upon on their final Eno collaboration, Remain in Light (1980). Often classified as their magnum opus and one of the best albums of the 1980s, the album integrated several new musicians, including a horn section, which helped the band further experiment on their African-style rhythms and their use of funk, pop, and electronics. After Remain in Light, the band went on a three-year hiatus and worked on solo projects. During their hiatus, the live album The Name of This Band Is Talking Heads (1982), was released; it features live recordings of songs from their four albums to date, as well as the previously unreleased song "A Clean Break (Let's Work)".

In 1983, the band parted ways with Eno and released their fifth album, Speaking in Tongues (1983). The album continued the rhythmic innovation of Remain in Light, but in a more stripped-down, rigid pop song structure. The album also contained the band's first and only top ten hit, "Burning Down the House". The band's sixth album, Little Creatures (1985), marked a major musical departure from their previous albums – its songs being straightforward pop songs mostly written by Byrne alone. After Little Creatures, the band released True Stories (1986), an album containing songs from Byrne's film True Stories. Notable songs from the album include one of the group's biggest hits, "Wild Wild Life", and "Radio Head", a song from which the English rock band Radiohead took their name. Two years later, Talking Heads released their final album, Naked. The album marked a return to the experimentation and styles of their Eno albums, most notably Remain in Light. After Naked, the band went on a hiatus; formally announcing their breakup three years later in 1991. Their final release was the song "Sax and Violins", released on the soundtrack of Until the End of the World that same year.

Since their breakup, 12 previously unreleased songs have been officially released. The compilation album Sand in the Vaseline: Popular Favorites (1992) included five and the box set Once in a Lifetime (2003) included one, "In Asking Land", an outtake from the Naked sessions. The 2005 reissue of Talking Heads: 77 included the previously unreleased "I Feel It in My Heart", and the 2006 reissues of Fear of Music and Remain in Light included unfinished outtakes from those albums' sessions.

== Songs ==
Key
†	Indicates single release
‡	Indicates song solely written by David Byrne

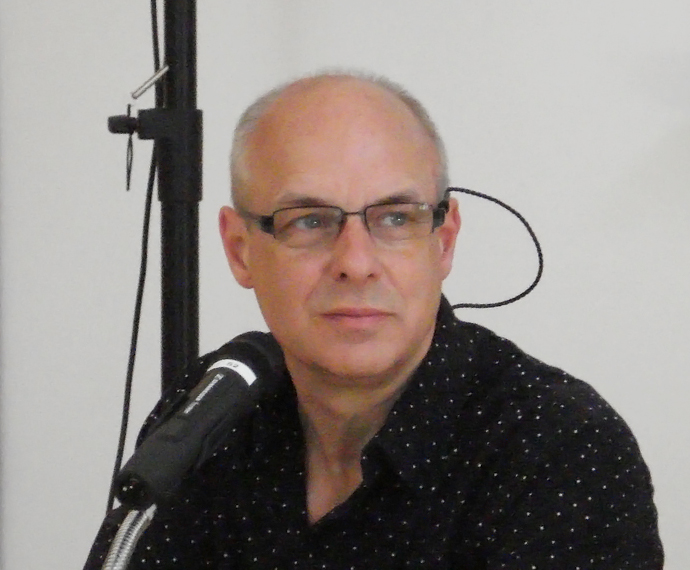
Talking Heads collaborated with producer Brian Eno on More Songs About Buildings and Food, Fear of Music, and Remain in Light.

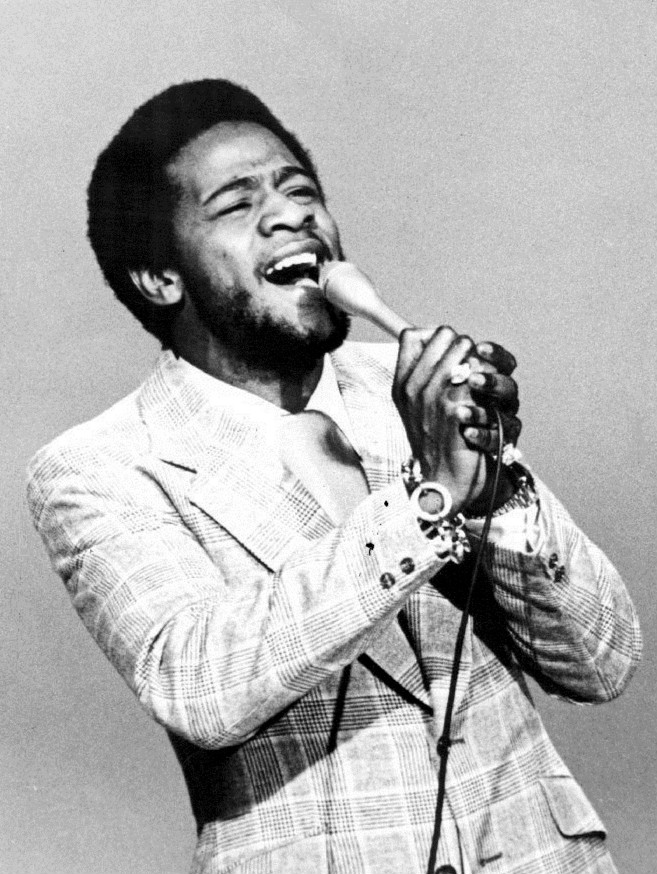
Talking Heads covered Al Green's song "Take Me to the River" on their second album, More Songs About Buildings and Food.

Name of song, writer(s), original release, and year of release
Song	Writer(s)	Original release	Year	Ref.
"Air"	David Byrne ‡	Fear of Music	1979	
"And She Was" †	David Byrne ‡	Little Creatures	1985	
"Animals"	David Byrne ‡	Fear of Music	1979	
"Artists Only"	David Byrne; Wayne Zieve	More Songs About Buildings and Food	1978	
"Big Business" (live)	David Byrne; John Chernoff	Stop Making Sense (expanded edition)	2023	
"The Big Country"	David Byrne ‡	More Songs About Buildings and Food	1978	
"Big Daddy"	Talking Heads	Naked	1988	
"Bill"	Talking Heads	Naked	1988	
"Blind" †	Talking Heads	Naked	1988	
"The Book I Read"	David Byrne ‡	Talking Heads: 77	1977	
"Born Under Punches (The Heat Goes On)"	Talking Heads; Brian Eno	Remain in Light	1980	
"Burning Down the House" †	Talking Heads	Speaking in Tongues	1983	
"Cities" †	David Byrne ‡	Fear of Music	1979	
"City of Dreams"	David Byrne ‡	True Stories	1986	
"A Clean Break (Let's Work)" (live)	David Byrne ‡	The Name of This Band Is Talking Heads	1982	
"Cool Water"	Talking Heads	Naked	1988	
"Creatures of Love"	David Byrne ‡	Little Creatures	1985	
"Crosseyed and Painless" †	Talking Heads; Brian Eno	Remain in Light	1980	
"Dancing for Money" (Note: Song is an unfinished outtake.)	David Byrne ‡	Fear of Music (CD reissue)	2006	
"The Democratic Circus"	Talking Heads	Naked	1988	
"Don't Worry About the Government"	David Byrne ‡	Talking Heads: 77	1977	
"Double Groove"	Talking Heads; Brian Eno	Remain in Light (CD reissue)	2006	
"Dream Operator"	David Byrne ‡	True Stories	1986	
"Drugs"	David Byrne; Brian Eno (Note: Originally credited solely to David Byrne.)	Fear of Music	1979	
"Electric Guitar"	David Byrne ‡	Fear of Music	1979	
"The Facts of Life"	Talking Heads	Naked	1988	
"Fela's Riff"	Talking Heads; Brian Eno	Remain in Light (CD reissue)	2006	
"First Week/Last Week... Carefree"	David Byrne ‡	Talking Heads: 77	1977	
"Found a Job"	David Byrne ‡	More Songs About Buildings and Food	1978	
"Gangster of Love"	Talking Heads	Sand in the Vaseline: Popular Favorites	1992	
"Girlfriend Is Better" †	Talking Heads	Speaking in Tongues	1983	
"The Girls Want to Be with the Girls"	David Byrne ‡	More Songs About Buildings and Food	1978	
"Give Me Back My Name"	David Byrne ‡	Little Creatures	1985	
"The Good Thing"	David Byrne ‡	More Songs About Buildings and Food	1978	
"The Great Curve"	Talking Heads; Brian Eno	Remain in Light	1980	
"Happy Day"	David Byrne ‡	Talking Heads: 77	1977	
"Heaven"	David Byrne; Jerry Harrison	Fear of Music	1979	
"Hey Now"	David Byrne ‡	True Stories	1986	
"Houses in Motion" †	Talking Heads; Brian Eno	Remain in Light	1980	
"I Feel It in My Heart"	David Byrne ‡	Talking Heads: 77 (reissue)	2005	
"I Get Wild/Wild Gravity"	Talking Heads	Speaking in Tongues	1983	
"I Want to Live" (demo)	David Byrne ‡	Sand in the Vaseline: Popular Favorites	1992	
"I Wish You Wouldn't Say That" (Note: Later appeared on Sand in the Vaseline: Popular Favorites) †	David Byrne ‡	Non-album single B-side to "Psycho Killer"	1977	
"I Zimbra" †	David Byrne; Brian Eno; Hugo Ball	Fear of Music	1979	
"I'm Not in Love"	David Byrne ‡	More Songs About Buildings and Food	1978	
"In Asking Land"	Talking Heads	Once in a Lifetime (box set)	2003	
"The Lady Don't Mind †"	Talking Heads	Little Creatures	1985	
"Life During Wartime" †	Talking Heads	Fear of Music	1979	
"Lifetime Piling Up"	Talking Heads	Sand in the Vaseline: Popular Favorites	1992	
"Listening Wind"	Talking Heads; Brian Eno	Remain in Light	1980	
"Love for Sale"	David Byrne ‡	True Stories	1986	
"Love → Building on Fire" (Note: Also known as "Love Goes to Building on Fire") †	David Byrne ‡	Non-album single	1977	
"Making Flippy Floppy"	Talking Heads	Speaking in Tongues	1983	
"Memories Can't Wait"	David Byrne; Jerry Harrison	Fear of Music	1979	
"Mind"	David Byrne ‡	Fear of Music	1979	
"Mommy Daddy You and I"	Talking Heads	Naked	1988	
"Moon Rocks"	Talking Heads	Speaking in Tongues	1983	
"Mr. Jones"	Talking Heads	Naked	1988	
"New Feeling" (Note: Originally released as the B-side to "Love → Building on Fire" in early 1977 before Talking Heads: 77.) †	David Byrne ‡	Talking Heads: 77	1977	
"No Compassion"	David Byrne ‡	Talking Heads: 77	1977	
"(Nothing But) Flowers" †	Talking Heads	Naked	1988	
"Once in a Lifetime" †	Talking Heads; Brian Eno	Remain in Light	1980	
"The Overload"	Talking Heads; Brian Eno	Remain in Light	1980	
"Papa Legba"	David Byrne ‡	True Stories	1986	
"Paper"	David Byrne ‡	Fear of Music	1979	
"People Like Us"	David Byrne ‡	True Stories	1986	
"Perfect World"	David Byrne; Chris Frantz	Little Creatures	1985	
"Popsicle"	Talking Heads	Sand in the Vaseline: Popular Favorites	1992	
"Psycho Killer" †	David Byrne; Chris Frantz; Tina Weymouth	Talking Heads: 77	1977	
"Pull Up the Roots"	Talking Heads	Speaking in Tongues	1983	
"Pulled Up" †	David Byrne ‡	Talking Heads: 77	1977	
"Puzzlin' Evidence"	David Byrne ‡	True Stories	1986	
"Radio Head"	David Byrne ‡	True Stories	1986	
"Right Start"	Talking Heads; Brian Eno	Remain in Light (CD reissue)	2006	
"Road to Nowhere" †	David Byrne ‡	Little Creatures	1985	
"Ruby Dear"	Talking Heads	Naked	1988	
"Sax and Violins" †	Talking Heads	Until the End of the World: Music from the Motion Picture Soundtrack	1991	
"Seen and Not Seen"	Talking Heads; Brian Eno	Remain in Light	1980	
"Slippery People"	Talking Heads	Speaking in Tongues	1983	
"Stay Hungry"	David Byrne; Chris Frantz	More Songs About Buildings and Food	1978	
"Stay Up Late"	David Byrne ‡	Little Creatures	1985	
"Sugar on My Tongue" (demo)	David Byrne ‡	Sand in the Vaseline: Popular Favorites	1992	
"Swamp"	Talking Heads	Speaking in Tongues	1983	
"Take Me to the River" † (Al Green cover)	Al Green; Mabon "Teenie" Hodges	More Songs About Buildings and Food	1978	
"Television Man"	David Byrne ‡	Little Creatures	1985	
"Tentative Decisions"	David Byrne ‡	Talking Heads: 77	1977	
"Thank You for Sending Me an Angel"	David Byrne ‡	More Songs About Buildings and Food	1978	
"This Must Be the Place (Naive Melody)" †	Talking Heads	Speaking in Tongues	1983	
"Totally Nude"	Talking Heads	Naked	1988	
"Two Note Swivel"	Talking Heads	Speaking in Tongues (CD reissue)	2006	
"Uh-Oh, Love Comes to Town" †	David Byrne ‡	Talking Heads: 77	1977	
"Unison"	Talking Heads; Brian Eno	Remain in Light (CD reissue)	2006	
"Walk It Down"	David Byrne ‡	Little Creatures	1985	
"Warning Sign"	David Byrne ‡	More Songs About Buildings and Food	1978	
"What a Day That Was" (live)	David Byrne ‡	Stop Making Sense	1984	
"Who Is It?"	David Byrne ‡	Talking Heads: 77	1977	
"Wild Wild Life" †	David Byrne ‡	True Stories	1986	
"With Our Love"	David Byrne ‡	More Songs About Buildings and Food	1978	
