= Once in a Lifetime (Talking Heads album) =

2003 box set by Talking Heads

Box set by Talking Heads
- Released: November 18, 2003
- Recorded: 1976–92
- Genres: New wave; art punk
- Length: 232:45 (CDs); 299:59 (CDs and DVD)
- Label: Warner Bros.
- Producers: Tony Bongiovi; Brian Eno; Nick Launay; Steve Lillywhite; Lance Quinn; Mark Spector

Talking Heads chronology
Once in a Lifetime: The Best of Talking Heads (1992)	Once in a Lifetime (2003)	The Best of Talking Heads (2004)

Professional ratings
Aggregate scores
Source	Rating
Metacritic	83/100
Review scores
Source	Rating
AllMusic	4.5/5 stars
Blender	5/5 stars
Entertainment Weekly	A−
The Guardian	3/5 stars
Q	4/5 stars
The Village Voice	C

Once in a Lifetime is a three-CD box set by American post-punk/new wave band Talking Heads, released in the United States by Sire, Warner Bros, and Rhino in 2003. The set also includes a DVD containing an expanded version of the music video compilation Storytelling Giant. The discs are packaged in a wide horizontal book that recalls a CD longbox, featuring paintings by Russian artists Vladimir Dubossarsky and Alexander Vinogradov and with art direction by Stefan Sagmeister (for which he received a 2005 Grammy Award for Best Boxed or Special Limited Edition Package). Sagmeister would later work with David Byrne and Brian Eno on their 2008 collaborative album Everything That Happens Will Happen Today.

Only one previously unreleased song appears in this release: the Naked outtake "In Asking Land", previously reworked into the song "Carnival Eyes" on Byrne's 1989 solo album Rei Momo. Other non-album tracks are: "Sugar on My Tongue"—a 1975 studio demo, dating from when the band was still a trio (before Jerry Harrison joined); the 1977 non-album single "Love → Building on Fire", the "Psycho Killer" B-side "I Wish You Wouldn't Say That"; and two Naked-era songs – "Sax and Violins" (finished in 1991 for the soundtrack to the film Until the End of the World) and "Lifetime Piling Up" (finished in 1992 for the Sand in the Vaseline compilation). These non-album tracks had all been included on the 1992 compilation Sand in the Vaseline, though three non-album tracks (1975 studio demo "I Want to Live" and 1992's "Gangster of Love" and "Popsicle") remain exclusive to that compilation, in terms of CD releases. Remastered versions of these three tracks were later issued on the digital-only release Bonus Rarities and Outtakes in 2006.

This box set marked the first CD release of "A Clean Break", a 1977 live recording from 1982's The Name of This Band Is Talking Heads. However, that album was remastered and reissued in 2004 as a two-disc set.

Once in a Lifetime contains four previously unreleased "alternate versions", three of which would later be reissued in various forms: "Uh-Oh, Love Comes to Town" and "New Feeling" are the original Tony Bongiovi "pop experiment" mixes, including brass parts and other more "commercial" production techniques that the band ultimately rejected; "Cities" is an alternate take that includes a verse previously heard only in live performances (most notably in a deleted scene from Stop Making Sense); and "Drugs" is an early mix of the song, featuring Robert Fripp on guitar and very different production and instrumentation than the final version. The alternate version of "Cities" was reissued on the 2006 remaster of Fear of Music, while the alternate versions of "New Feeling" and "Drugs" were reissued digitally on Bonus Rarities and Outtakes.

Promo materials for the box set show that the original title of the box would have been More Than Meets The Eye: Talking Heads Box Set.

== Track listing ==
All tracks are written by David Byrne except where noted.

Disc one
No.	Title	Writer(s)	Origin	Length
1.	"Sugar on My Tongue"		Popular Favorites 1976–1992: Sand in the Vaseline, 1992	2:35
2.	"Love → Building on Fire"		Non-album single, 1977	2:59
3.	"I Wish You Wouldn't Say That"		B-side of "Psycho Killer" single, 1977	2:37
4.	"Don't Worry About the Government"		Talking Heads: 77, 1977	3:00
5.	"Uh-Oh, Love Comes to Town" (alternate version)		Talking Heads: 77	2:55
6.	"New Feeling" (alternate version)		Talking Heads: 77	3:03
7.	"Pulled Up"		Talking Heads: 77	4:30
8.	"Psycho Killer"	Byrne, Chris Frantz, Tina Weymouth	Talking Heads: 77	4:20
9.	"Warning Sign"	Byrne, Frantz	More Songs About Buildings and Food, 1978	3:55
10.	"Artists Only"	Byrne, Wayne Zieve	More Songs About Buildings and Food	3:35
11.	"Tentative Decisions"		Talking Heads: 77	3:07
12.	"No Compassion"		Talking Heads: 77	4:49
13.	"Stay Hungry"	Byrne, Frantz	More Songs About Buildings and Food	2:41
14.	"I'm Not in Love"		More Songs About Buildings and Food	4:34
15.	"The Book I Read"		Talking Heads: 77	4:09
16.	"Thank You for Sending Me an Angel"		More Songs About Buildings and Food	2:13
17.	"Found a Job"		More Songs About Buildings and Food	5:01
18.	"A Clean Break" (live)		The Name of This Band Is Talking Heads, 1982	4:57
19.	"Take Me to the River"	Al Green, Mabon Hodges	More Songs About Buildings and Food	5:04
20.	"The Big Country"		More Songs About Buildings and Food	5:31
21.	"Heaven"		Fear of Music, 1979	4:01
Total length:				79:36

Disc two
No.	Title	Writer(s)	Origin	Length
1.	"I Zimbra"	Byrne, Brian Eno, Hugo Ball	Fear of Music	3:01
2.	"Cities" (alternate version)		Fear of Music	5:27
3.	"Life During Wartime"	Byrne, Frantz, Jerry Harrison, Weymouth	Fear of Music	3:41
4.	"Air"		Fear of Music	3:32
5.	"Memories Can't Wait"	Byrne, Harrison	Fear of Music	3:30
6.	"Drugs" (alternate version)	Byrne, Eno	Fear of Music	3:33
7.	"Once in a Lifetime"	Byrne, Eno, Frantz, Harrison, Weymouth	Remain in Light, 1980	4:20
8.	"Born Under Punches (The Heat Goes On)"	Byrne, Eno, Frantz, Harrison, Weymouth	Remain in Light	5:47
9.	"Listening Wind"	Byrne, Eno, Frantz, Harrison, Weymouth	Remain in Light	4:41
10.	"Houses in Motion"	Byrne, Eno, Frantz, Harrison, Weymouth	Remain in Light	4:31
11.	"Crosseyed and Painless"	Byrne, Eno, Frantz, Harrison, Weymouth	Remain in Light	4:45
12.	"Burning Down the House"	Byrne, Frantz, Harrison, Weymouth	Speaking in Tongues, 1983	4:01
13.	"Making Flippy Floppy"	Byrne, Frantz, Harrison, Weymouth	Speaking in Tongues	5:54
14.	"Girlfriend Is Better"	Byrne, Frantz, Harrison, Weymouth	Speaking in Tongues	5:43
15.	"Slippery People"	Byrne, Frantz, Harrison, Weymouth	Speaking in Tongues	5:05
16.	"Swamp"	Byrne, Frantz, Harrison, Weymouth	Speaking in Tongues	5:10
17.	"This Must Be the Place (Naive Melody)"	Byrne, Frantz, Harrison, Weymouth	Speaking in Tongues	4:56
Total length:				77:37

Disc three
No.	Title	Writer(s)	Origin	Length
1.	"And She Was"		Little Creatures, 1985	3:39
2.	"Stay Up Late"		Little Creatures	3:44
3.	"Creatures of Love"		Little Creatures	4:15
4.	"The Lady Don't Mind"	Byrne, Frantz, Harrison, Weymouth	Little Creatures	4:04
5.	"Road to Nowhere"		Little Creatures	4:20
6.	"Wild Wild Life"		True Stories, 1986	3:41
7.	"Love for Sale"		True Stories	3:41
8.	"People Like Us"		True Stories	4:29
9.	"Puzzlin' Evidence"		True Stories	5:23
10.	"City of Dreams"		True Stories	5:09
11.	"Blind"	Byrne, Frantz, Harrison, Weymouth	Naked, 1988	5:00
12.	"Mr. Jones"	Byrne, Frantz, Harrison, Weymouth	Naked	4:21
13.	"The Democratic Circus"	Byrne, Frantz, Harrison, Weymouth	Naked	5:04
14.	"(Nothing But) Flowers"	Byrne, Frantz, Harrison, Weymouth	Naked	5:33
15.	"In Asking Land"	Byrne, Frantz, Harrison, Weymouth	Previously unreleased outtake from Naked sessions	3:58
16.	"Sax and Violins"	Byrne, Frantz, Harrison, Weymouth	Until the End of the World: Music from the Motion Picture Soundtrack, 1991	5:18
17.	"Lifetime Piling Up"	Byrne, Frantz, Harrison, Weymouth	Popular Favorites 1976–1992: Sand in the Vaseline	3:53
Total length:				75:32 (232:45)

Disc four: Storytelling Giant DVD
No.	Title	Music video director(s)	Length
1.	"Once in a Lifetime"	Toni Basil, Byrne
2.	"Wild Wild Life"	Byrne
3.	"Stay Up Late"	Ted Bafaloukos
4.	"Blind" (previously unreleased)	Rocky Morton, Annabel Jankel
5.	"Crosseyed and Painless"	Basil
6.	"Burning Down the House"	Byrne
7.	"And She Was"	Jim Blashfield
8.	"Sax and Violins" (previously unreleased)	Wim Wenders
9.	"This Must Be the Place (Naive Melody)"	Byrne
10.	"The Lady Don't Mind"	Jim Jarmusch
11.	"Love for Sale"	Byrne, Melvin Sokolsky
12.	"(Nothing But) Flowers" (previously unreleased)	Tibor Kalman, Sandy MacLeod
13.	"Road to Nowhere"	Byrne, Stephen R. Johnson
Total length:			66:19 (299:59)
