= Popular Favorites 1976–1992: Sand in the Vaseline =

Compilation album by Talking Heads
- Released: October 12, 1992
- Recorded: 1975–1991
- Genre: New wave; rock
- Length: 139:47
- Label: Sire; Warner Bros.
- Producer: Tony Bongiovi; David Byrne; Brian Eno; Chris Frantz; Jerry Harrison; Nick Launay; Steve Lillywhite; Lance Quinn; Mark Spector; Tina Weymouth

Talking Heads chronology
Naked (1988)	Popular Favorites 1976–1992: Sand in the Vaseline (1992)	Once in a Lifetime: The Best of Talking Heads (1992)

Singles from Popular Favorites 1976–1992: Sand in the Vaseline
- 1. "Lifetime Piling Up" Released: 1992

Professional ratings
Review scores
Source	Rating
AllMusic	4.5/5 stars
Encyclopedia of Popular Music	5/5 stars

Popular Favorites 1976–1992: Sand in the Vaseline is a two-disc compilation album by American rock band Talking Heads, released in 1992. It contains two previously unreleased demo recordings ("Sugar on My Tongue," "I Want to Live"), a non-album A-side ("Love → Building on Fire") and B-side ("I Wish You Wouldn't Say That") and three newly finished songs ("Gangster of Love," "Lifetime Piling Up" and "Popsicle"). The last three tracks were all based on unreleased outtakes from previous studio sessions and had been finished for exclusive release on this compilation.

The album's title and cover art incorporated the 1974 painting by Ed Ruscha, Sand in the Vaseline. It was also available as a three-disc LP set at the time of release.

== Track listing ==
All tracks are written by David Byrne, except where noted.

Disc one – 1976–1983
No.	Title	Writer(s)	Original release	Length
1.	"Sugar on My Tongue"		previously unreleased demo, 1975	2:36
2.	"I Want to Live"		previously unreleased demo, 1976	3:23
3.	"Love → Building on Fire"		non-album single, 1977	2:57
4.	"I Wish You Wouldn't Say That"		B-side of "Psycho Killer" single, 1977	2:36
5.	"Psycho Killer"	Byrne, Chris Frantz, Tina Weymouth	Talking Heads: 77, 1977	4:20
6.	"Don't Worry About the Government"		Talking Heads: 77	3:00
7.	"No Compassion"		Talking Heads: 77	4:50
8.	"Warning Sign"	Byrne, Frantz	More Songs About Buildings and Food, 1978	3:54
9.	"The Big Country"		More Songs About Buildings and Food	5:30
10.	"Take Me to the River"	Al Green, Teenie Hodges	More Songs About Buildings and Food	5:02
11.	"Heaven"	Byrne, Jerry Harrison	Fear of Music, 1979	4:02
12.	"Memories Can't Wait"	Byrne, Harrison	Fear of Music	3:31
13.	"I Zimbra"	Byrne, Brian Eno, Hugo Ball	Fear of Music	3:07
14.	"Once in a Lifetime"	Byrne, Eno, Frantz, Harrison, Weymouth	Remain in Light, 1980	4:19
15.	"Crosseyed and Painless"	Byrne, Eno, Frantz, Harrison, Weymouth	Remain in Light	4:45
16.	"Burning Down the House"	Byrne, Frantz, Harrison, Weymouth	Speaking in Tongues, 1983	4:01
17.	"Swamp"	Byrne, Frantz, Harrison, Weymouth	Speaking in Tongues	5:13
18.	"This Must Be the Place (Naive Melody)"	Byrne, Frantz, Harrison, Weymouth	Speaking in Tongues	4:56
Total length:				72:02

Disc two – 1984–1992
No.	Title	Writer(s)	Original release	Length
1.	"Life During Wartime" (Live)	Byrne, Frantz, Harrison, Weymouth	Stop Making Sense, 1984	5:04
2.	"Girlfriend Is Better" (Live)	Byrne, Frantz, Harrison, Weymouth	Stop Making Sense	3:36
3.	"And She Was"		Little Creatures, 1985	3:39
4.	"Stay Up Late"		Little Creatures	3:53
5.	"Road to Nowhere"		Little Creatures	4:20
6.	"Wild Wild Life"		True Stories, 1986	3:40
7.	"Love for Sale"		True Stories	4:32
8.	"City of Dreams"		True Stories	5:08
9.	"Mr. Jones"	Byrne, Frantz, Harrison, Weymouth	Naked, 1988	4:20
10.	"Blind"	Byrne, Frantz, Harrison, Weymouth	Naked	5:00
11.	"(Nothing But) Flowers"	Byrne, Frantz, Harrison, Weymouth	Naked	5:34
12.	"Sax and Violins"	Byrne, Frantz, Harrison, Weymouth	Until the End of the World soundtrack, 1991	5:18
13.	"Gangster of Love"	Byrne, Frantz, Harrison, Weymouth	Based on outtakes from Remain in Light and Naked sessions, 1980/1987 and finished in August, 1991	4:29
14.	"Lifetime Piling Up"	Byrne, Frantz, Harrison, Weymouth	Outtake from Naked sessions	3:53
15.	"Popsicle"	Byrne, Frantz, Harrison, Weymouth	Outtake from Speaking in Tongues sessions	5:19
Total length:				67:45

== Charts ==
Sales chart performance for Popular Favorites 1976–1992: Sand in the Vaseline
Chart (1992)	Peak position
New Zealand Albums (RMNZ)	37
UK Albums (OCC)	7
US Billboard 200	158

Chart performance for singles from Sand in the Vaseline: Popular Favorites
Single	Year	Chart	Position
"Sax and Violins"	1991	US Alternative Airplay (Billboard)	1
"Lifetime Piling Up"	1992	US Alternative Airplay (Billboard)	11
