= Once in a Lifetime: The Best of Talking Heads =

Once in a Lifetime – The Best of Talking Heads

Greatest hits album by Talking Heads
- Released: October 12, 1992
- Recorded: 1977–1991
- Genre: New wave; rock
- Length: 63:20
- Label: EMI; Warner Bros.
- Producer: Tony Bongiovi; Lance Quinn; Brian Eno; Nick Launay; Gary Goetzman; Steve Lillywhite; Talking Heads

Talking Heads chronology
Popular Favorites 1976–1992: Sand in the Vaseline (1992)	Once in a Lifetime – The Best of Talking Heads (1992)	Once in a Lifetime (2003)

Professional ratings
Review scores
Source	Rating
AllMusic	4.5/5 stars

Once in a Lifetime: The Best of Talking Heads is a compilation album by Talking Heads, released on October 12, 1992. The single disc version of Sand in the Vaseline: Popular Favorites, it was released outside of the US and UK in place of that album.

== Track listing ==
All tracks are written by David Byrne, Chris Frantz, Jerry Harrison, and Tina Weymouth, except where noted.

No.	Title	Writer(s)	Original release (Year)	Length
1.	"Psycho Killer"	Byrne, Frantz, Weymouth	Talking Heads: 77 (1977)	4:21
2.	"Take Me to the River"	Al Green, Mabon "Teenie" Hodges	More Songs About Buildings and Food (1978)	5:01
3.	"Once in a Lifetime"	Byrne, Frantz, Harrison, Weymouth, Brian Eno	Remain in Light (1980)	4:19
4.	"Burning Down the House"		Speaking in Tongues (1983)	4:01
5.	"This Must Be the Place (Naive Melody)"		Speaking in Tongues	4:55
6.	"Slippery People" (Live)		Stop Making Sense (1984)	4:14
7.	"Life During Wartime" (Live)		Stop Making Sense	5:04
8.	"And She Was"	Byrne	Little Creatures (1985)
9.	"Road to Nowhere"	Byrne	Little Creatures	4:20
10.	"Wild Wild Life"	Byrne	True Stories (1986)	3:41
11.	"Blind"		Naked (1988)	5:00
12.	"(Nothing But) Flowers"		Naked	5:34
13.	"Sax and Violins"		Until the End of the World Soundtrack (1991)	5:18
14.	"Lifetime Piling Up"		Previously unreleased	3:52
Total length:				63:20

== Charts ==
Chart performance for Once in a Lifetime: The Best of Talking Heads
Chart (1992)	Peak position
Australian Albums (ARIA)	35
Dutch Albums (Album Top 100)	66
New Zealand Albums (RMNZ)	3
UK Albums (OCC)	7

== Certifications ==
Certifications for Once in a Lifetime: The Best of Talking Heads
Region	Certification	Certified units/sales
New Zealand (RMNZ)	Platinum	15,000^{^}
^{^} Shipments figures based on certification alone.
