= Same as It Ever Was (disambiguation) =

Same as It Ever Was may refer to:

- Same as It Ever Was (House of Pain album), a 1994 album (or the title song)
- "Once in a Lifetime" (Talking Heads song), a 1981 song that repeatedly uses the phrase "Same as it ever was"
- Same as It Ever Was, a 2009 album in the Talking Heads discography
- "Same As It Ever Was", a 2014 song by Gob on the album Apt. 13
- "Same As It Ever Was", a 2008 collaboration by Lackluster with Thuyen Nguyen
- "Same As It Ever Was (Start Today)", a 2014 song by Michael Franti
- Khumba Mela (same as it ever was), a 1982 film by Alby Falzon
- "It is the same as it ever was.", a sentence from a 1910 sermon by Henry Scott Holland

== See also ==
- Same as It Never Was (disambiguation)
