= Same as It Never Was =

Same as It Never Was may refer to:

- Same as It Never Was (novel), a 2003 novel by Claire Scovell LaZebnik, the basis of a 2006 TV movie
- "Same as It Never Was" (TMNT 2003), a 2005 episode of the Teenage Mutant Ninja Turtles TV series
- Same as It Never Was, the name of shop in the 2005–2010 Ghost Whisperer TV series
- Same as It Never Was (album), a 2008 album by The Herbaliser
- "Same As It Never Was", a song performed by the Weathermen on the 2002 album Def Jux Presents 2
- "Same as It Never Was", a song by Joanne Shaw Taylor from the 2010 album Diamonds in the Dirt

== See also ==
- Same as It Ever Was (disambiguation)
