= Naked (Talking Heads album) =

Studio album by Talking Heads
- Released: March 15, 1988
- Recorded: August–December 1987
- Studios: Davout, Paris, France; Sigma Sound, New York City
- Genres: Art pop; worldbeat; funk
- Length: 52:17 (CD); 46:56 (LP)
- Labels: Fly; Sire
- Producers: Steve Lillywhite; Talking Heads

Talking Heads chronology
True Stories (1986)	Naked (1988)	Popular Favorites 1976–1992: Sand in the Vaseline (1992)

Singles from Naked
- 1. "Blind" Released: August 1988; 2. "(Nothing But) Flowers" Released: October 3, 1988

Naked is the eighth and final studio album by American new wave band Talking Heads, released on March 15, 1988, by Sire Records. Following the more straightforward new wave and pop rock sound on Little Creatures (1985) and True Stories (1986), Naked marked a return to the worldbeat stylings of both Remain in Light (1980) and Speaking in Tongues (1983), blending elements of Afrobeat, Latin funk, and art pop. The album's songs were formed from improvisational jam sessions recorded in Paris, which featured the participation of numerous guest musicians such as former Smiths guitarist Johnny Marr and singer Kirsty MacColl. Lyrics and vocals were then added in New York City following the Paris recordings.

Naked was positively received by critics, who viewed it as a return to form for the band following the mixed responses to True Stories; retrospective assessments, however, have been more lukewarm. The album was also a moderate commercial success, peaking at No. 19 on the US Billboard 200 and No. 3 on the UK Albums Chart, later being certified gold by both the RIAA and BPI. Following the album's release, Talking Heads officially went on hiatus, with its members focusing on various side-projects over the course of the next few years; frontman David Byrne announced in December 1991 that the band had dissolved.

== Recording ==
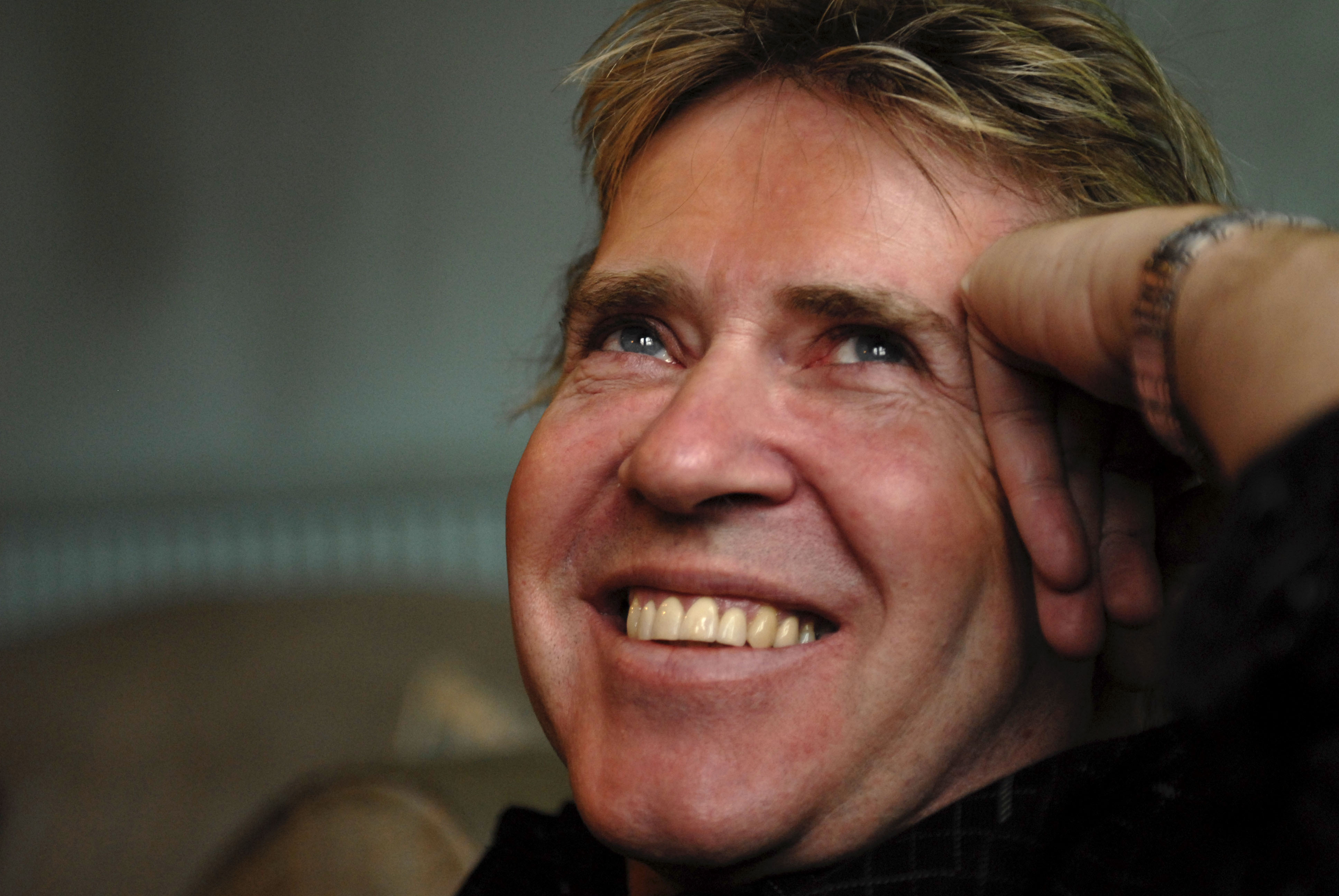
Co-producer Steve Lillywhite (pictured in 2010) helped consolidate the album's shift in sound.

Wanting to try something different after their use of regional American music and the pop song format on their previous two albums Little Creatures (1985) and True Stories (1986), Talking Heads decided to record their next album in Paris with a group of international musicians. According to the album's liner notes, the decision to do so was in part a reaction to the foreign policy of the Ronald Reagan administration, which had grown increasingly isolationist in approach. Prior to leaving for France, the band recorded about 40 improvisational tracks that would serve as the foundation for the sessions in Paris.

In Paris, the band, along with producer Steve Lillywhite, were joined by a number of other musicians in the recording studio where they would rehearse and play for the entire day. At the end of each day, one take was selected as being the ideal version of a particular tune. "Paris is a wonderful place to work," observed drummer Chris Frantz in the liner notes of Once in a Lifetime: The Best of Talking Heads. "We were really embracing world culture fully." In the interest of freedom for the musicians, it was decided that lyrics and melodies would be left until later. The lyrics were not overdubbed until the band returned to New York. Many of David Byrne's lyrics were improvisations sung along with the prerecorded tracks until he found something that he felt worked. In this way, the melodies and lyrics evolved in a similar fashion as the songs themselves. According to Lillywhite, the album's more organic, percussive sound was a deliberate move away from the bombastic production that he had helped make commonplace in the 1980s, stating that "It wasn't made so angular and mixed so loud as it might have been in the past. It was more of a warm sound with all for the beats compensated for."

Byrne told Record Mirror in 1988 that many of the songs on Naked are "about human beings stripped of their pretensions; stripped of their surface trappings", which in turn inspired putting a picture of a chimpanzee on the album cover.

== Critical reception ==
Professional ratings
Review scores
Source	Rating
AllMusic	3/5 stars
Chicago Tribune	2.5/4 stars
Christgau's Record Guide	B+
Los Angeles Times	4/4 stars
Mojo	3/5 stars
NME	9.68/10
Rolling Stone	4/5 stars
The Rolling Stone Album Guide	2/5 stars
Spin Alternative Record Guide	8/10
Uncut	6/10

Naked was well received by critics, who hailed it as a vast improvement over True Stories. Chris Willman from the Los Angeles Times said the band abandoned "the stripped-down four-piece rock approach of late" in favor of a "far more eclectic big-band, world music extravaganza." In Rolling Stone, Anthony DeCurtis called the album "stylistically bold and intellectually provocative," a "dizzying and disturbing piece of work" that "marks a return to the more open-ended, groove-oriented style the Heads defined on Remain in Light." He noted that "the vital human harmony suggested by the international band of players .. is the strongest counterpoint to the album's pervasive themes of alienation and dread." He concluded by interpreting the view of the album's lyrics: "The human race consists of some pretty cool people ... but it's got a very destructive monkey on its back. Human survival is not guaranteed. With humor and good-hearted-ness [sic], hope and fear, Talking Heads contemplate a world on the eve of destruction on this important record — and leave wide open the question of what the dawn will bring."

Naked was voted the 24th best album of 1988 in The Village Voice's annual Pazz & Jop poll of American critics nationwide. Robert Christgau, the poll's supervisor, regarded it as "an honest if less than sustaining internationalist gesture" and said "Byrne concealed the ricketiness of his current compositional practice by riding in on soukous's jetstream, but the trick didn't stick", attributing the band's diminished success to a weariness with the music business. In Christgau's Record Guide: The '80s (1990), he wrote, "where Paul Simon appropriated African musicians, David Byrne just hires them, for better and worse – this is T. Heads funk heavy on the horns, which aren't fussy or obtrusive because Byrne knew where to get fresh ones. What's African about it from an American perspective is that the words don't matter – it signifies sonically." However, he called, "(Nothing But) Flowers" a "gibe at ecology fetishism that's very reassuring". Years later, he revised his stance on both Naked and True Stories, "which I once thought overrated. I was wrong. They sucked."

In a retrospective review, Michael Hastings from AllMusic found Naked "alternately serious and playful", allowing Byrne to continue worrying about "the government, the environment, and the plight of the working man as it frees up the rest of the band to trade instruments and work with guest musicians. It's closest in spirit to Remain in Light – arguably too close." He further stated that "the album sounds technically perfect, but there's little of the loose, live feel the band achieved with former mentor Brian Eno. It's quite a feat to pull off a late-career album as ambitious as Naked, and the Heads do so with style and vitality." He concluded that "the album's elegiac, airtight tone betrays the sound of four musicians growing tired of the limits they've imposed on one another." Stephen Thomas Erlewine said it "marked a return to their worldbeat explorations, although it sometimes suffered from Byrne's lyrical pretensions."

== Track listing ==
All lyrics written by David Byrne, all music composed by Byrne, Chris Frantz, Jerry Harrison, and Tina Weymouth.

=== Cassette/CD versions ===
No.	Title	Length
1.	"Blind"	4:58
2.	"Mr. Jones"	4:18
3.	"Totally Nude"	4:10
4.	"Ruby Dear"	3:48
5.	"(Nothing But) Flowers"	5:31
6.	"The Democratic Circus"	5:01
7.	"The Facts of Life"	6:25
8.	"Mommy Daddy You and I"	3:58
9.	"Big Daddy"	5:37
10.	"Bill"	3:21
11.	"Cool Water"	5:10
Total length:		52:17

=== LP version ===
Side one
No.	Title	Length
1.	"Blind"	4:58
2.	"Mr. Jones"	4:18
3.	"Totally Nude"	4:03
4.	"Ruby Dear"	3:48
5.	"(Nothing But) Flowers"	5:14
Total length:		22:21

Side two
No.	Title	Length
6.	"The Democratic Circus"	5:01
7.	"The Facts of Life"	6:25
8.	"Mommy Daddy You and I"	3:58
9.	"Big Daddy"	4:01
10.	"Cool Water"	5:10
Total length:		24:35 (46:56)

=== 2005 DualDisc reissue bonus track ===
No.	Title	Length
12.	"Sax and Violins"	5:51
Total length:		58:08

Notes

- Track 8, "Mommy Daddy You and I", was listed as "Mommy Daddy" on the vinyl label
- Track 12 originally appeared on the soundtrack to the film Until the End of the World (1991)

== Personnel ==
Talking Heads

- David Byrne - vocals, guitars, toy piano, cello, vocoder, flute, slide guitar
- Jerry Harrison - guitar, keyboards, backing vocals, piano, organ, shaker, slide guitar, flute, tambourine, drums
- Tina Weymouth - bass guitar, backing vocals, keyboards, organ, alto saxophone, piano, flute, speaker
- Chris Frantz - drums, electric percussion, keyboards

Additional Musicians

- Johnny Marr – guitars (tracks 4, 5, 8, 11)
- Brice Wassy – percussion (tracks 4, 5, 7, 9)
- Abdou M'Boup – percussion, talking drum, congas, cowbell (tracks 1-3, 5)
- Yves N'Djock – guitars (tracks 1, 3, 5)
- Eric Weissberg – pedal steel guitar (tracks 3, 10), Dobro (track 6)
- Mory Kanté – kora (tracks 2, 7)
- Wally Badarou – keyboard (tracks 1, 7)
- Manolo Badrena – percussion, congas (tracks 2, 8)
- Sydney Thiam – congas (track 6), percussion (track 10)
- Lenny Pickett – saxophones (tracks 1, 9)
- Steve Elson – saxophones (tracks 1, 9)
- Robin Eubanks – trombone (tracks 1, 2, 9)
- Laurie Frink – trumpets (tracks 1, 9)
- Earl Gardner – trumpets (tracks 1, 9)
- Stan Harrison – alto saxophone (tracks 1, 9)
- Al Acosta – tenor saxophone (track 2)
- Steven Gluzband – trumpet (track 2)
- Jose Jerez – trumpet (track 2)
- Bobby Porcelli – alto saxophone (track 2)
- Steve Sacks – baritone saxophone (track 2)
- Charlie Sepulveda – trumpet (track 2)
- Dale Turk – bass trombone (track 2)
- Arthur Russell – cello (track 10)
- Moussa Cissokao – percussion (track 4)
- Nino Gioia – percussion (track 7)
- Philippe Servain – accordion (track 3)
- James Fearnley – accordion (track 8)
- Phil Bodner – cor anglais (track 11)
- Don Brooks – harmonica (track 9)
- Kirsty MacColl – backing vocals (tracks 5, 10)
- Alex Haas – whistling (track 10)

=== Technical ===
- Nick Delre – assistant overdubbing engineer; mixing (track 8)
- James Farber – mixing (tracks 2, 3, 6, 7, 9)
- Fernando Kral – overdubbing engineer; mixing (track 11)
- Richard Manwaring – recording engineer
- Jean Loup Morette – assistant engineer
- Joseph Williams – assistant engineer
- Jack Skinner – mastering
- Mark Wallis – mixing (tracks 1, 4, 5, 6)

== Charts ==
=== Weekly charts ===
Weekly chart performance for Naked
Chart (1988)	Peak position
Australian Albums (Australian Music Report)	8
Austrian Albums (Ö3 Austria)	8
Canada Top Albums/CDs (RPM)	13
Dutch Albums (Album Top 100)	13
European Albums (Music & Media)	6
Finnish Albums (Suomen virallinen lista)	2
German Albums (Offizielle Top 100)	12
Italian Albums (Musica e dischi)	4
New Zealand Albums (RMNZ)	7
Norwegian Albums (VG-lista)	7
Swedish Albums (Sverigetopplistan)	9
Swiss Albums (Schweizer Hitparade)	6
UK Albums (Official Charts)	3
US Billboard 200	19

Chart (2023)	Peak position
Hungarian Physical Albums (MAHASZ)	14

=== Year-end charts ===
Year-end chart performance for Naked
Chart (1988)	Position
Australian Albums (Australian Music Report)	58
Canada Top Albums/CDs (RPM)	49
Dutch Albums (Album Top 100)	97
European Albums (Music & Media)	66
US Billboard 200	94

== Certifications and sales ==
Region	Certification	Certified units/sales
United Kingdom (BPI)	Gold	100,000^{^}
United States (RIAA)	Gold	500,000^{^}
^{^} Shipments figures based on certification alone.
