= Stop Making Sense (album) =

Live album by Talking Heads
- Released: September 1984
- Recorded: December 13–16, 1983
- Venues: The Pantages Theatre, Hollywood
- Genres: New wave; post-punk
- Length: 39:37
- Labels: Sire; Warner Bros.
- Producers: Talking Heads; Gary Goetzman

Talking Heads chronology
Speaking in Tongues (1983)	Stop Making Sense (1984)	Little Creatures (1985)

Singles from Stop Making Sense
- 1. "Once in a Lifetime" Released: October 1984; 2. "Slippery People" Released: October 1984; 3. "Girlfriend Is Better" Released: November 1984

Stop Making Sense is a live album by the American rock band Talking Heads, also serving as the soundtrack to the concert film of the same name. It was released in September 1984 and features nine tracks from the film, albeit with treatment and editing. The album spent over two years on the Billboard 200 chart. It was their first album to be distributed by EMI outside North America.

Limited pressings of the original LP version featured a full-colour picture book wrapped around the album jacket; standard versions had many of the pictures (printed in black and white) and captions on the album's inner sleeve. The CD release of the album includes the full-colour book, but it rearranges the layout to conform to the dimensions of a square CD booklet (compared to the vertically oriented rectangular shape of the LP book). In 1999, a 16-track re-release—with content and sound closely matching those of the film—coincided with the 15th anniversary of the concert filming. An expanded 40th anniversary edition was released by Rhino Records in August 2023, marking the first official release of the complete concert recording, alongside a theatrical re-release of the film by A24. A tribute album, Everyone's Getting Involved: A Tribute to Talking Heads' Stop Making Sense, was released by A24 Music on May 17, 2024, featuring artists such as Paramore, Miley Cyrus, Lorde, The National, Girl in Red, Blondshell and BadBadNotGood.

The album was ranked number 345 on Rolling Stone magazine's list of the 500 greatest albums of all time. In 2000, it was voted number 394 in Colin Larkin's All Time Top 1000 Albums. In 2012, Slant Magazine listed the album at No. 61 on its list of "Best Albums of the 1980s".

== Background and recording ==
Frantz stated in the liner notes of Once in a Lifetime: The Best of Talking Heads, "When ["Slippery People"] was originally recorded on Speaking in Tongues, it had a funky and compact sound. This Stop Making Sense version is funky and big as a house. (Or should I say church?)"

== Critical reception ==
Professional ratings
Review scores
Source	Rating
AllMusic	3.5/5 stars
The Austin Chronicle	4.5/5 stars
Chicago Tribune	3.5/4 stars
Mojo	5/5 stars
Q	5/5 stars
Rolling Stone	4/5 stars
The Rolling Stone Album Guide	2.5/5 stars
Spin Alternative Record Guide	7/10
Uncut	9/10
The Village Voice	B+

"A bona fide classic," opined Neil Jeffries in a five-star review of the reissue for Empire, "a perfectly measured snapshot of a widely loved and respected band playing at the height of their powers ... No other band could do this. No other music movie soundtrack sounds this good." "A timely reminder of the achievements of perhaps the most underrated band of the post-punk age," concurred Q. "From its stripped-down intro ... to the nine-piece finale, Stop Making Sense remains heady, stirring stuff."

== Track listing ==
All songs written by David Byrne, Chris Frantz, Jerry Harrison, Tina Weymouth except as noted.

=== Side one ===
1. "Psycho Killer" (Byrne, Frantz, Weymouth) – 4:28
2. "Swamp" – 3:50 (LP) 4:28 (cassette, CD)
3. "Slippery People" – 3:35 (LP) 4:13 (different mix; cassette, CD)
4. "Burning Down the House" – 4:14
5. "Girlfriend Is Better" – 3:32 (LP) 5:07 (cassette, CD)

=== Side two ===
1. "Once in a Lifetime" (Byrne, Brian Eno, Frantz, Harrison, Weymouth) – 4:34 (LP) 5:34 (cassette, CD)
2. "What a Day That Was" (Byrne) – 5:08 (LP) 6:30 (cassette, CD)
3. "Life During Wartime" – 4:52 (LP) 5:52 (cassette, CD)
4. "Take Me to the River" (Al Green, Teenie Hodges) – 6:00

==== Film/Special New Edition Soundtrack ====
Bonus live tracks "Heaven" and "This Must Be the Place (Naive Melody)" were available as B-sides on various US 7-inch and UK 12-inch singles during the album's original release. These versions were released on the Special Edition soundtrack.

1. "Psycho Killer" (Byrne, Frantz, Weymouth) – 4:24
2. "Heaven" (Byrne, Harrison) – 3:41
3. "Thank You for Sending Me an Angel" (Byrne) – 2:09
4. "Found a Job" (Byrne) – 3:15
5. "Slippery People" – 4:00
6. "Burning Down the House" – 4:06
7. "Life During Wartime" – 5:51
8. "Making Flippy Floppy" – 4:40
9. "Swamp" – 4:30
10. "What a Day That Was" (Byrne) – 6:00
11. "This Must Be the Place (Naive Melody)" – 4:57
12. "Once in a Lifetime" (Byrne, Eno, Frantz, Harrison, Weymouth) – 5:25
13. "Genius of Love" (Weymouth, Frantz, Adrian Belew, Steven Stanley) (performed by Tom Tom Club) – 4:30
14. "Girlfriend Is Better" – 5:06
15. "Take Me to the River" (Green, Hodges) – 5:32
16. "Crosseyed and Painless" (Byrne, Eno, Frantz, Harrison, Weymouth) – 6:11

==== 2023 Expanded Edition Remaster ====
Bonus live tracks include "Cities" and "Big Business/I Zimbra", both of which were cut from the original 1984 film and soundtrack. Produced by Jerry Harrison.

1. "Psycho Killer" (Byrne, Frantz, Weymouth) – 4:24
2. "Heaven" (Byrne, Harrison) – 3:41
3. "Thank You for Sending Me an Angel" (Byrne) – 2:09
4. "Found a Job" (Byrne) – 3:15
5. "Slippery People" – 4:00
6. "Cities" (Byrne) - 3:34
7. "Burning Down the House" – 4:06
8. "Life During Wartime" – 5:51
9. "Making Flippy Floppy" – 4:40
10. "Swamp" – 4:30
11. "What a Day That Was" (Byrne) – 6:00
12. "This Must Be the Place (Naive Melody)" – 4:57
13. "Once in a Lifetime" (Byrne, Eno, Frantz, Harrison, Weymouth) – 5:25
14. "Big Business / I Zimbra" (Byrne, Eno, Hugo Ball) - (7:24)
15. "Genius of Love" (Weymouth, Frantz, Adrian Belew, Steven Stanley) (performed by Tom Tom Club) – 4:30
16. "Girlfriend Is Better" – 5:06
17. "Take Me to the River" (Green, Hodges) – 5:32
18. "Crosseyed and Painless" (Byrne, Eno, Frantz, Harrison, Weymouth) – 6:11

== Personnel ==
=== Talking Heads ===
- David Byrne – guitar, vocals
- Chris Frantz – drums, vocals
- Jerry Harrison – guitar, keyboards, vocals
- Tina Weymouth – bass guitar, synth bass, guitar, vocals

=== Additional personnel ===
- Bernie Worrell – keyboards
- Alex Weir – guitar, vocals
- Steve Scales – percussion
- Ednah Holt – backing vocals
- Lynn Mabry – backing vocals

=== Production ===
- Talking Heads, Gary Goetzman – producers
- Ted Jensen at Sterling Sound, NYC – mastering

== Charts ==
=== Weekly charts ===
1984–1985 weekly chart performance for Stop Making Sense
Chart (1984–1985)	Peak position
Australian Albums (Kent Music Report)	9
Austrian Albums (Ö3 Austria)	12
Canada Top Albums/CDs (RPM)	33
Dutch Albums (Album Top 100)	2
European Albums (Eurotipsheet)	24
German Albums (Offizielle Top 100)	25
New Zealand Albums (RMNZ)	2
Swedish Albums (Sverigetopplistan)	26
Swiss Albums (Schweizer Hitparade)	13
US Billboard 200	41

2000 weekly chart performance for Stop Making Sense
Chart (2000)	Peak position
Scottish Albums (Official Charts)	15
UK Albums (Official Charts)	24

2023–2024 chart performance for Stop Making Sense
Chart (2023–2024)	Peak position
Belgian Albums (Ultratop Flanders)	29
Belgian Albums (Ultratop Wallonia)	94
Croatian International Albums (HDU)	1
German Albums (Offizielle Top 100)	20
Hungarian Physical Albums (MAHASZ)	14
Portuguese Albums (AFP)	81

=== Year-end charts ===
1985 year-end chart performance for Stop Making Sense
Chart (1985)	Position
Australian Albums (Kent Music Report)	10
Dutch Albums (Album Top 100)	9
German Albums (Offizielle Top 100)	45
New Zealand Albums (RMNZ)	4

1986 year-end chart performance for Stop Making Sense
Chart (1986)	Position
New Zealand Albums (RMNZ)	34

== Certifications and sales ==
Certifications and sales for Stop Making Sense
Region	Certification	Certified units/sales
Australia	—	150,000
Germany (BVMI)	Gold	250,000^{^}
New Zealand (RMNZ)	Platinum	15,000^{^}
United Kingdom (BPI) video	Platinum	50,000^{*}
United Kingdom (BPI)	Gold	100,000^{^}
United States (RIAA)	2× Platinum	2,000,000^{^}
^{*} Sales figures based on certification alone.^{^} Shipments figures based on certification alone.

== See also ==
- List of 1980s albums considered the best
