= Blind (Talking Heads song) =

Single by Talking Heads

from the album Naked
- B-side: "Bill"
- Released: August 1988
- Recorded: 1987
- Studio: Davout (Paris)
- Length: 4:58
- Label: Warner Bros.
- Composers: David Byrne; Chris Frantz; Jerry Harrison; Tina Weymouth
- Lyricist: David Byrne
- Producers: Steve Lillywhite; Talking Heads

Talking Heads singles chronology
"Radio Head" (1986)	"Blind" (1988)	"(Nothing But) Flowers" (1988)

"Blind" is a song by American rock band Talking Heads. The music was created by Talking Heads and lyrics written by David Byrne, the band's lead vocalist and guitarist. The recording was produced by Steve Lillywhite with the rest of the band. The track is on the band's eighth and final studio album, Naked (1988).

The track was released as a single with the B-side "Bill", which was not available on the original vinyl album but was released on the compact disc and cassette.

== Recording ==
"Blind" was recorded at Studio Davout in Paris, which was originally constructed as a cinema. During the vocal sessions, Byrne wore a suit and a pair of glass black horn-rims while sitting at a desk. Byrne had a sheet of paper on the desk with shorthand notation containing rough ideas of what he would sing. Individuals in the control room provided suggestions to Byrne, who then memorized these parts; from this improvisation session, the only lyric generated was the word "blind", which later became the song's chorus. Weymouth recalled that Bryne's head "moved like a muppet" during the recording of this vocal part and said that the band "all watched, fascinated, as if he were a bug on a pin under a microscope."

== Music video ==
Directed by Annabel Jankel and Rocky Morton, the music video for "Blind" is unusual among Talking Heads' videography in that it portrays an elaborate narrative over the course of the song. Apparently lampooning the 1988 United States presidential election, the video portrays a group of Americans (among them a literal Bible thumper) electing a sentient, malevolent monkey wrench into public office. At its victory rally, the wrench, shown baring human teeth, continuously shouts and spits into a jubilant crowd as his aides smugly watch on. However, as the video progresses, the crowd becomes more aware of the wrench's malevolence, with their joy turning into confusion, fear, and eventually distress.

Midway through the video, a group of people at the front of the crowd investigate a dragon's-head faucet at the face of the wrench's podium; an aide then fires his gun into the faucet, only to be blown back into the crowd behind him.

Eventually, the wrench is overthrown by both the crowd and his own lackeys, being uprooted from his podium and thrust into the distance. The wrench shrinks in size as this goes on, eventually reaching the size of a toy before being caught by a smiling infant. The video ends with a freeze-frame shot of the infant's fist clutching the once-malevolent tool.

At various points, the video intercuts to footage of a shirtless David Byrne against a solid black background, singing and gesticulating at the camera. Several of these interludes utilize masking effects to superimpose either duplicates of Byrne's face or the faces of his bandmates against his own.

== Critical reception ==
Lisa Tilston of Record Mirror described the song as "freakily funky and disappointingly tuneless", but added it was "probably a grower in the classic Heads mould". Cash Box said that "Byrne has hidden a sly little comment about turning away from life in the Talking Heads high quality bushes of funky rock." Rolling Stone characterized the song as "a percussive, Afro-flavored track that instantly strikes a note of semiotic upheaval."

== Personnel ==
Credits adapted from the Once in a Lifetime: The Best of Talking Heads liner notes

Talking Heads

- David Byrne – lead vocal, guitar
- Tina Weymouth – bass guitar
- Jerry Harrison – French piano
- Chris Frantz – drums

Additional musicians

- Abdou M'Boup – talking drum, congas, cowbell
- Wally Badarou – keyboard congas
- Yves N'Djock – guitar
- Lenny Pickett – tenor saxophone, horn arrangement
- Steve Elson – baritone saxophone
- Robin Eubanks – trombone
- Laurie Frink – trumpet
- Earl Gardner – trumpet

== Charts ==
Chart (1988)	Peak position
UK Singles (OCC)	59
US Mainstream Rock (Billboard)	39
