= Little Creatures =

Studio album by Talking Heads
- Released: June 10, 1985
- Recorded: October 1984 – March 1985
- Studio: Sigma Sound (New York City)
- Genres: Pop; roots rock
- Length: 38:38
- Label: Sire
- Producer: Talking Heads

Talking Heads chronology
Stop Making Sense (1984)	Little Creatures (1985)	True Stories (1986)

Singles from Little Creatures
- 1. "The Lady Don't Mind" Released: May 1985; 2. "Road to Nowhere" Released: June 1985; 3. "And She Was" Released: September 1985

Little Creatures is the sixth studio album by the American rock band Talking Heads, released on June 10, 1985, by Sire Records. Self-produced by the band, the album was a departure from the experimental nature of their previous albums, exhibiting a more straightforward pop style, with elements of Afrobeat, funk, country, and Americana. Some songs featured pedal steel guitar, saxophones, and backing vocals, while others featured percussion instruments such as water drum and accordion. Frontman David Byrne's lyrics were also more mature, with themes including love, sex, and babies. The album's artwork is a painting by the Southern folk artist Howard Finster, depicting cartoon caricatures of the band members in a dreamlike landscape.

The album was a success, reaching number 20 on the US Billboard 200, eventually selling over two million copies in the US; it is the band's best-selling studio album. Three singles were released: "The Lady Don't Mind", "Road to Nowhere" and "And She Was", each of which featured music videos. It was also positively received, with several critics praising the band's return to roots; it was voted album of the year in The Village Voice annual Pazz & Jop critics' poll. Retrospective reviews have also remained positive.

== Background and recording ==
According to Talking Heads' drummer Chris Frantz, Little Creatures was the band's first album where frontman David Byrne prepared demos for the material before the recording sessions. These demos were a departure from the polyrhythmic songs of their previous albums Remain in Light (1980) and Speaking in Tongues (1983), instead being singer-songwriter songs with elements of Americana. According to the author Sytze Steenstra, Byrne composed the songs for Little Creatures and the band's follow-up album True Stories (1986) at the same time. The working title for Little Creatures was In Defense of Television.

The band produced the album themselves, with Eric Thorngren engineering, and recorded the album at Sigma Sound Studios in New York City. The backing tracks were recorded first by the band – Byrne, Frantz, Tina Weymouth and Jerry Harrison – after which additional players were brought in for overdubs. These included Steve Scales on percussion, Naná Vasconcelos on water drum ("Perfect World"), Eric Weissberg on pedal steel guitar ("Creatures of Love" and "Walk It Down"), Lenny Pickett on saxophones, Jimmy Macdonell on accordion ("Road to Nowhere") and various backing singers. Frantz also said that Byrne sang within his vocal range for the album, departing from the crooning style of the band's earlier releases.

== Content ==
Little Creatures was a return-to-basics album compared to the band's more recent experimental releases, featuring simpler songs rooted in pop structures and comparisons to their 1977 debut album. In The New York Times, John Rockwell commented that the music evoked the releases of Frantz's and Weymouth's side project Tom Tom Club. The album also features elements of Afrobeat and funk, as well as some experimental instruments, such as country pedal steel guitar on "Creatures of Love" and Cajun accordion on "Road to Nowhere". Talking to The New York Times in 1985, Weymouth said:

It's so much fun to be able to relax and just play without feeling you have to be avant-garde all the time. We spent so many years trying to be original that we don't know what original is anymore.

AllMusic's William Ruhlmann said David Byrne's lyrics were "still intriguingly quirky" but were more mature. Rolling Stone's Ron Tannenbaum said that the album is "the sound of David Byrne falling in love with normalcy". Changes in Byrne's personal life led to many of his lyrics focusing on sex and babies, such as on "Creatures of Love" and "Stay Up Late". His approach to love, described by Pitchfork's Madison Bloom as "affectionate but not possessive", inspired the female figures on "And She Was" and "The Lady Don't Mind". "Television Man" reflected the idea that televisions influenced people more than they realized.

== Release ==
The album's artwork is a painting by the Southern folk artist Howard Finster, depicting cartoon caricatures of the band members in a dreamlike landscape and "full of spiritual admonitions"; Byrne is in the center carrying a globe on his shoulders. Bryne sent Finster Polaroid images of the band members but left the design up to him. Frantz described the cover as "magnificently quirky".

Upon its release on June 10, 1985, Little Creatures reached number 20 on the Billboard 200 in the US, eventually becoming the band's best-selling studio album, with more than two million copies sold in the United States. Three singles were released: "The Lady Don't Mind" in May 1985, "Road to Nowhere" in June, and "And She Was" in September; music videos were made for all three singles.

== Reception ==
Professional ratings
Review scores
Source	Rating
AllMusic	4.5/5 stars
Chicago Tribune	2.5/4 stars
The Encyclopedia of Popular Music	4/5 stars
Hot Press	11/12
Pitchfork	8.0/10
The Rolling Stone Album Guide	2/5 stars
Spin Alternative Record Guide	8/10
Tom Hull – on the Web	A
Uncut	9/10
The Village Voice	A

Little Creatures received positive reviews from critics. Reviewing the album in The Village Voice, Robert Christgau praised the band's return to their roots, writing: "What the relatively straight and spare approach signifies is that their expansive '80s humanism doesn't necessarily require pluralistic backup or polyrhythmic underpinnings. It affirms that compassionate grown-ups can rock and roll." In The New York Times, Rockwell wrote that whereas in their previous releases, the band "strove for formalistic clarity", Little Creatures is "full of joyous summer pop anthems". Tannenbaum and Chris Willman of the Los Angeles Times remarked that the album's approach can come across as a regression, yet both agreed its pop sound and joyful nature makes up for it. Billboard described the album as the band's "most accessible work yet", writing that it "meshes with the current shift toward rock Americana, and does so without a trace of calculation." It was voted album of the year in The Village Voice's annual Pazz & Jop critics' poll. NME also voted it the 27th best album of the year.

In a retrospective review for AllMusic, Ruhlmann praised the band's return to their roots, noting that its increased accessibility paid off commercially and creatively. In Pitchfork, Bloom said: "On Little Creatures, Talking Heads polished every surface of their sound. It wasn't so much a step in the right direction as an inevitable conclusion for a band who, like everyone, must embrace adulthood at some point. Little Creatures is not Talking Heads' best album, but it is their case for aging gracefully, and with great fondness for life." Michael Gallucci of Ultimate Classic Rock referred to Little Creatures as the band's "last great work" and "an album with a breadth almost as big as the heartland it looks to for inspiration". In a list ranking Talking Heads' albums worst to best, the publication placed Little Creatures at number five (out of eight). Bryan Wawzenek wrote that the album's production aged poorly, "its unforgiving sharpness often at odds with the left-of-center characters the band describes", although its songs are "great". In a similar list, Stereogum ranked it seventh, with Alex Tatusian writing that the album's pop sound felt out of place against the band's earlier works. Additionally, Tatusian felt that beneath its production, the songs were "heavy-handed on the weirdness, as opposed to open and reading-inducing". In 2015, the album appeared on a NME list compiling 50 albums released in 1985 that still sound great today.

== Track listing ==
All tracks are written by David Byrne, except where noted.

Side one
No.	Title	Lyrics	Music	Length
1.	"And She Was"			3:36
2.	"Give Me Back My Name"			3:20
3.	"Creatures of Love"			4:12
4.	"The Lady Don't Mind"		Byrne; Chris Frantz; Jerry Harrison; Tina Weymouth	4:03
5.	"Perfect World"	Byrne; Frantz		4:26

Side two
No.	Title	Length
6.	"Stay Up Late"	3:51
7.	"Walk It Down"	4:42
8.	"Television Man"	6:10
9.	"Road to Nowhere"	4:19
Total length:		38:38

1985 UK CD bonus track
No.	Title	Length
10.	"The Lady Don't Mind" (Extended Mix)	6:51

2005 reissue bonus tracks
No.	Title	Length
10.	"Road to Nowhere" (Early version)	4:37
11.	"And She Was" (Early version)	3:36
12.	"Television Man" (Extended mix)	7:52

== Personnel ==
Talking Heads

- David Byrne – vocals, guitars
- Chris Frantz – drums
- Jerry Harrison – keyboards, guitars, vocals
- Tina Weymouth – bass guitar, vocals

Additional musicians

- Ellen Bernfeld – backing vocals (tracks 5, 7)
- Andrew Cader – washboard (track 9)
- Erin Dickens – backing vocals (tracks 8, 9)
- Diva Gray – backing vocals (track 9)
- Gordon Grody – backing vocals
- Lani Groves – backing vocals
- Jimmy Macdonell – accordion (tracks 9)
- Lenny Pickett – saxophones
- Steve Scales – percussion
- Naná Vasconcelos – percussion (track 5)
- Eric Weissberg – pedal steel guitar (tracks 3, 7)
- Kurt Yahjian – backing vocals

Recording

- Jack Skinner – mastering
- Eric Thorngren – engineer, mixing
- Melanie West – second engineer

== Charts ==
=== Weekly charts ===
Weekly chart performance for Little Creatures
Chart (1985)	Peak position
Australian Albums (Kent Music Report)	2
Austrian Albums (Ö3 Austria)	4
Canada Top Albums/CDs (RPM)	18
Dutch Albums (Album Top 100)	4
European Albums (Music & Media)	14
Finnish Albums (Suomen virallinen lista)	37
German Albums (Offizielle Top 100)	9
Italian Albums (Musica e dischi)	22
New Zealand Albums (RMNZ)	1
Norwegian Albums (VG-lista)	16
Swedish Albums (Sverigetopplistan)	10
Swiss Albums (Schweizer Hitparade)	12
UK Albums (Official Charts)	10
US Billboard 200	20

Weekly chart performance for Little Creatures
Chart (2023)	Peak position
Croatian International Albums (HDU)	3
Hungarian Physical Albums (MAHASZ)	12

=== Year-end charts ===
1985 year-end chart performance for Little Creatures
Chart (1985)	Position
Australian Albums (Kent Music Report)	7
Canada Top Albums/CDs (RPM)	57
Dutch Albums (Album Top 100)	39
German Albums (Offizielle Top 100)	47
New Zealand Albums (RMNZ)	5
UK Albums (Gallup)	77

1986 year-end chart performance for Little Creatures
Chart (1986)	Position
Australian Albums (Kent Music Report)	17
New Zealand Albums (RMNZ)	12
UK Albums (Gallup)	59

=== Decade-end charts ===
Decade-end chart performance for Little Creatures
Chart (1980–1989)	Position
Australian Albums (Kent Music Report)	21

== Certifications and sales ==
Certifications and sales for Little Creatures
Region	Certification	Certified units/sales
Australia	—	150,000
Germany (BVMI)	Gold	250,000^{^}
New Zealand (RMNZ)	Platinum	15,000^{^}
United Kingdom (BPI)	Gold	100,000^{^}
United States (RIAA)	2× Platinum	2,000,000^{^}
^{^} Shipments figures based on certification alone.
