= Road to Nowhere =

1985 single by Talking Heads

Single by Talking Heads

from the album Little Creatures
- B-side: "Television Man"
- Released: June 3, 1985
- Studio: Sigma Sound (New York City)
- Length: 4:19 (album version); 3:59 (single edit)
- Label: Sire
- Songwriter: David Byrne
- Producer: Talking Heads

Talking Heads singles chronology
"The Lady Don't Mind" (1985)	"Road to Nowhere" (1985)	"And She Was" (1985)

Music video
- "Road to Nowhere" on YouTube

"Road to Nowhere" is a song by the American rock band Talking Heads from their sixth studio album Little Creatures (1985). The song was written by David Byrne and released as a single in 1985. It reached No. 25 on the U.S. Billboard Album Rock Tracks chart and entered the top 10 in eight other countries.

== Composition ==
"I wanted to write a song that presented a resigned, even joyful look at doom," recalls David Byrne in the liner notes of Once in a Lifetime: The Best of Talking Heads (1992). "At our deaths and at the apocalypse... (always looming, folks). I think it succeeded. The front bit, the white gospel choir, is kind of tacked on, 'cause I didn't think the rest of the song was enough... I mean, it was only two chords. So, out of embarrassment, or shame, I wrote an intro section that had a couple more in it."

== Critical reception ==
Cashbox said that "this marching single which features David Byrne's soothing lead vocal is a curious and circus-ride look at life." Billboard said that within the song "a cappella gospel leads into Louisiana hootenanny."

== Music video ==
The video for the song was directed by Byrne and Stephen R. Johnson and features the band and various objects revolving, including boxes revolving around David Byrne's head. Tina Weymouth and Chris Frantz portray a couple growing older, and masked businessmen pummel each other with briefcases and a runaway shopping cart, as if in their own "road to nowhere".

Some parts were shot in the back yard and pool of actor Stephen Tobolowsky, who was co-writing Byrne's satirical musical comedy film True Stories (1986) at the time. Scenes were also shot at Calvary Baptist Church in Hi Vista, California. Director Johnson re-used some of the effects techniques in award-winning music videos for Peter Gabriel the following year: "Sledgehammer" and "Big Time".

It was nominated for Video of the Year at the 1986 MTV Video Music Awards.

== In pop culture ==
The song was used as the end credits theme of the 1989 film Little Monsters. The song was used in the 2008 American Bill Maher documentary film Religulous. In addition, it closes Ben Wolf’s 2025 pro-bike lane documentary Changing Lanes, which features David Byrne, an ardent bike rider.

== Personnel ==
Personnel taken from Little Creatures liner notes, and Sound on Sound.

Talking Heads

- David Byrne – lead and background vocals, electric guitar
- Jerry Harrison – Hammond organ, backing vocals
- Tina Weymouth – bass guitar, backing vocals
- Chris Frantz – drums

Additional musicians

- Andrew Cader – washboard
- Erin Dickens – backing vocals
- Diva Gray – backing vocals
- Gordon Grody – backing vocals
- Lani Groves – backing vocals
- Jimmy Macdonell – accordion
- Lenny Pickett – saxophone
- Steve Scales – percussion
- Kurt Yaghjian – backing vocals

== Charts ==
=== Weekly charts ===
Chart (1985)	Peak position
Australia (Kent Music Report)	16
Austria (Ö3 Austria Top 40)	9
Belgium (Ultratop 50 Flanders)	9
Canada Top Singles (RPM)	51
Europe (European Hot 100 Singles)	6
Ireland (IRMA)	6
Netherlands (Dutch Top 40)	8
Netherlands (Single Top 100)	10
New Zealand (Recorded Music NZ)	5
South Africa (Springbok Radio)	6
Switzerland (Schweizer Hitparade)	15
UK Singles (Official Charts)	6
US Mainstream Rock (Billboard)	25
West Germany (GfK)	6

=== Year-end charts ===
Chart (1985)	Position
Belgium (Ultratop)	60
Netherlands (Dutch Top 40)	80
Netherlands (Single Top 100)	82
UK Singles (OCC)	79

== Certifications ==
Region	Certification	Certified units/sales
New Zealand (RMNZ)	Platinum	30,000^{‡}
United Kingdom (BPI)	Gold	400,000^{‡}
^{‡} Sales+streaming figures based on certification alone.

== Cover versions and other uses ==
- Democratic Party politician Charlie Crist, in his unsuccessful 2010 run for the United States Senate in Florida, used the song in a campaign video without obtaining permission. David Byrne sued for copyright infringement and, in a legal settlement, Crist issued a video apology for his improper use.
