= More Songs About Buildings and Food =

1978 album by Talking Heads

Studio album by Talking Heads
- Released: July 14, 1978
- Recorded: March–April 1978
- Studio: Compass Point (Nassau, Bahamas)
- Genres: New wave; avant-pop; post-punk; psychedelic funk
- Length: 41:32
- Label: Sire
- Producers: Brian Eno; Talking Heads

Talking Heads chronology
Talking Heads: 77 (1977)	More Songs About Buildings and Food (1978)	Fear of Music (1979)

Song sample
- 30 seconds of "The Big Country": file; help

Singles from More Songs About Buildings and Food
- 1. "Take Me to the River" Released: June 30, 1978; 2. "The Girls Want to Be with the Girls" Released: 1978 (Italy); 3. "The Good Thing" Released: 1978 (Netherlands)

More Songs About Buildings and Food is the second album by the American rock band Talking Heads, released on July 14, 1978, by Sire Records. A new wave album, it was the band's first of three consecutive albums produced by Brian Eno, and saw the band move toward an increasingly danceable style, crossing singer David Byrne's unusual delivery with new emphasis on the rhythm section of bassist Tina Weymouth and drummer Chris Frantz.

More Songs established Talking Heads as a critical success, reaching No. 29 on the U.S. Billboard magazine's Pop Albums chart and No. 21 on the UK Albums Chart. The album featured the band's first top 30 single, a cover of Al Green's 1974 song "Take Me to the River".

== Artwork and title ==
The front cover of the album, conceived by Byrne and executed by artist Jimmy De Sana, is a photographic mosaic of the band comprising 529 close-up Polaroid photographs. The album's rear cover shows "Portrait U.S.A.", the first satellite color analog photomosaic of the United States from space, created by NASA and General Electric for National Geographic, published in July 1976. In his 2020 memoir, Remain in Love, Frantz recalled that Byrne and Weymouth took the Polaroid photographs for the front cover on the roof of the loft building in Long Island City that Frantz and Weymouth lived in. Frantz wrote that he "later realized [the cover art] was 'heavily influenced' by the photomosaic works of David Byrne's former girlfriend, Andrea Kovacs. We should have given her credit for that."

Of the album title, Weymouth told Creem in a 1979 interview:

When we were making this album I remembered this stupid discussion we had about titles for the last album. At that time I said, 'What are we gonna call an album that's just about buildings and food?' And Chris said, 'You call it more songs about buildings and food.'

Andy Partridge of XTC later claimed, however, that he gave the title to Byrne.

== Release ==
More Songs About Buildings and Food was released on July 14, 1978. It peaked at number 29 on the Billboard magazine's Pop Albums chart. The album's sole single, a cover of Al Green's "Take Me to the River", peaked at No. 26 on the pop singles chart in 1979, pushing the album to gold status.

Warner Music Group re-released and remastered the album in 2005, on its Warner Bros., Sire and Rhino Records labels in DualDisc format, with four bonus tracks on the CD side—"Stay Hungry" (1977 version), alternate versions of "I'm Not in Love" and "The Big Country", and the 'Country Angel' version of "Thank You for Sending Me an Angel". The DVD-Audio side includes both stereo and 5.1 surround high resolution (96 kHz/24bit) mixes, as well as a Dolby Digital version and videos of the band performing "Found a Job" and "Warning Sign". In Europe, it was released as a CD+DVDA two-disc set rather than a single DualDisc. The reissue was produced by Andy Zax with Talking Heads. On July 25, 2025, a 3CD deluxe edition was released.

== Critical reception ==
Professional ratings
Review scores
Source	Rating
AllMusic	5/5 stars
Chicago Tribune	4/4 stars
Christgau's Record Guide	A
The Guardian	4/5 stars
The Irish Times	5/5 stars
Mojo	4/5 stars
Pitchfork	8.8/10
The Rolling Stone Album Guide	4.5/5 stars
Spin Alternative Record Guide	9/10
Uncut	5/5 stars

The Washington Post's Harry Sumrall praised Talking Heads as “the new voice of the New Wave,” mentioning More Songs About Buildings and Food as the record that fulfilled this promise by giving punk’s rawness and energy a sophisticated artistic form through Brian Eno’s production.

Steve Simels of Stereo Review called it a punk album with "An eccentric mixture of Sixties funk and SoHo minimalism".

And Ken Emerson of Rolling Stone stated that the album was a "reconciliation of ‘art’ and punk rock" with "witty distillations of disco and reggae rhythms" and concluded with "The music represents a triumph over diversity, while the words spell out defeat by disparities between mind and body, head and heart.

Writing for Christgau's Record Guide: Rock Albums of the Seventies (1981), critic Robert Christgau said: "Here the Heads become a quintet in an ideal producer-artist collaboration—Eno contributes/interferes just enough... Every one of these eleven songs is a positive pleasure, and on every one the tension between Byrne's compulsive flights and the sinuous rock bottom of the music is the focus".

Retrospectively the album was added by the Brooklyn Rail in its list of avant-pop albums, the author Ian Gittins called it a post-punk album and Simon Reynolds described it as psychedelic funk.

More Songs About Buildings and Food was ranked at number four among the top "Albums of the Year" for 1978 by NME, with "Take Me to the River" ranked at number 16 among the year's top tracks. In 2003, the album was ranked number 382 on Rolling Stone's list of the 500 greatest albums of all time, 383 in 2012, and 364 in 2020. It was ranked number 57 on Rolling Stone's list of the greatest albums of 1967–1987.

It was ranked the 45th best album of the 1970s by Pitchfork in 2006. Reviewing the album for Pitchfork, Nick Sylvester reflected that it "transformed the Talking Heads from a quirky CBGB spectacle to a quirky near-unanimously regarded 'it' band."

== Track listing ==
All tracks are written by David Byrne, except where noted.

Side one
No.	Title	Length
1.	"Thank You for Sending Me an Angel"	2:11
2.	"With Our Love"	3:30
3.	"The Good Thing"	3:03
4.	"Warning Sign"	3:55
5.	"The Girls Want to Be with the Girls"	2:37
6.	"Found a Job" (*)	5:00

Side two
No.	Title	Writer(s)	Length
1.	"Artists Only"	Byrne; Wayne Zieve	3:34
2.	"I'm Not in Love"		4:33
3.	"Stay Hungry"	Byrne; Chris Frantz	2:39
4.	"Take Me to the River"	Al Green; Mabon "Teenie" Hodges	5:00
5.	"The Big Country"		5:30
Total length:			41:32

2005 reissue bonus tracks
No.	Title	Writer(s)	Length
12.	"Stay Hungry" (1977 version)	Byrne; Frantz	3:45
13.	"I'm Not in Love" (alternate version)		5:15
14.	"The Big Country" (alternate version)		5:01
15.	"Thank You for Sending Me an Angel" ("Country Angel" version)		2:12

Note

(*) Mixed at Mediasound Studios by Brian Eno and Ed Stasium

== Personnel ==
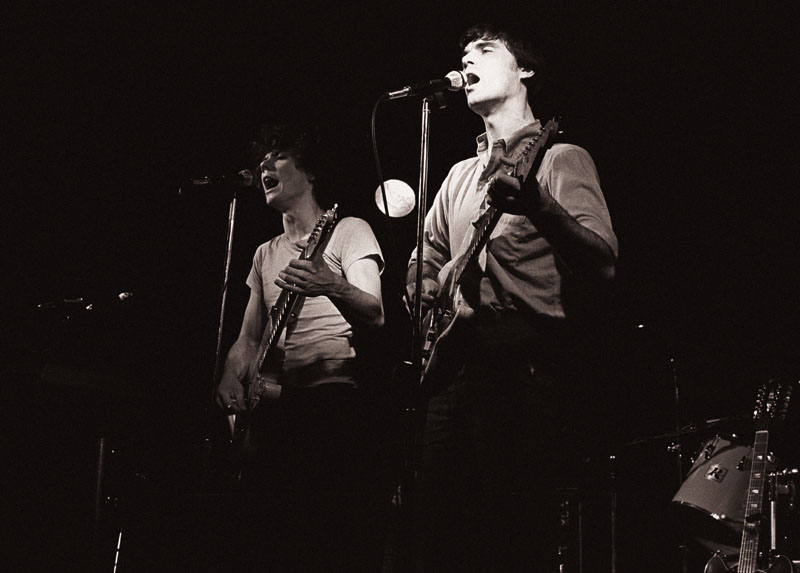
Harrison and Byrne (right) with Talking Heads at Jay's Longhorn Bar in Minneapolis, Minnesota, August 1978

Talking Heads

- David Byrne – lead vocals, guitar, synthesized percussion
- Chris Frantz – drums, percussion
- Jerry Harrison – piano, organ, synthesizer, guitar, backing vocals
- Tina Weymouth – bass guitar

Additional musicians

- Brian Eno – synthesizers, piano, guitar, percussion, backing vocals
- "Tina and the Typing Pool" (Weymouth plus women who worked in the studio offices) – backing vocals on "The Good Thing"

Production

- Benji Armbrister – assistant engineer
- Rhett Davies – engineer, mixing
- Joe Gastwirt – mastering
- Ed Stasium – mixing on "Found a Job"

== Charts ==
=== Weekly charts ===
Chart (1978–79)	Peak position
Australian Albums (Kent Music Report)	46
Canada Top Albums/CDs (RPM)	42
New Zealand Albums (RMNZ)	4
UK Albums (Official Charts)	21
US Billboard 200	29

Chart (2025)	Peak position
Hungarian Physical Albums (MAHASZ)	9

=== Year-end charts ===
Chart (1979)	Position
New Zealand Albums (RMNZ)	17
US Billboard 200 (RMNZ)	49

Chart (2025)	Peak position
Scottish Albums (Official Charts)	40
UK Albums Sales (OCC)	39

== Certifications and sales ==
Certifications and sales for More Songs About Buildings and Food
Region	Certification	Certified units/sales
New Zealand (RMNZ)	Gold	7,500^{^}
United Kingdom (BPI) 2006 release	Gold	100,000^{^}
United States (RIAA)	Gold	500,000^{^}
^{^} Shipments figures based on certification alone.
