= (Nothing But) Flowers =

Single by Talking Heads

from the album Naked
- B-side: "Ruby Dear" (Bush mix)
- Released: October 3, 1988
- Recorded: 1987
- Genre: Art pop; worldbeat
- Length: 5:39 (album version); 5:14 (LP edit version); 4:15 (single version); 3:28 (radio edit)
- Label: Sire
- Composers: David Byrne; Chris Frantz; Jerry Harrison; Tina Weymouth
- Lyricist: David Byrne
- Producers: Talking Heads; Steve Lilywhite

Talking Heads singles chronology
"Blind" (1988)	"(Nothing But) Flowers" (1988)	"Sax and Violins" (1991)

"(Nothing But) Flowers" is a song by rock band Talking Heads. It appears on the band's eighth and final studio album Naked (1988). It was released as the album's second single. In addition to the band, the song features Kirsty MacColl on backup vocals and Johnny Marr, formerly of The Smiths, on lead guitar. It peaked at number 79 in the UK singles chart. Filmmaker Kevin Smith used the song as the opening of Clerks 2 and was featured briefly in other film soundtracks to Meu Tio Matou um Cara (as covered by Caetano Veloso) and the animated feature The Mitchells vs. the Machines. The song is quoted at the start of Bret Easton Ellis' novel American Psycho (1991).

== Critical reception ==
On its release, Cash Box wrote, "A vision of a future where civilization is overrun by nature, much to the chagrin of the natives. Byrne is a genius at saying it all between the lines, and this little gem is a light-hearted romp into our greener-grass lives." Billboard said that the song highlighted the band's "genuinely unconventional pop with south-of the-border rhythms." Music & Media described "(Nothing But) Flowers" as "a rhythmic but also surprisingly melodic song with striking vocal harmonies".

== Music video ==
The song's music video featured uses of typography by graphic designers Tibor Kalman and Emily Oberman. The band performs in the video with an expanded lineup featuring Marr, MacColl, Brice Wassy, Yves N'Djock and Abdou M'Boup, all of whom performed on the studio recording of the song. The music video was directed by Sandy McLeod and David Byrne.

== Personnel ==
Personnel taken from Naked liner notes.

Talking Heads

- David Byrne – lead and backing vocals, guitar
- Chris Frantz – drums
- Jerry Harrison – Hammond organ
- Tina Weymouth – bass guitar

Additional musicians

- Kirsty MacColl – backing vocals
- Johnny Marr – 12-string guitar
- Abdou M'Boup – congas
- Yves N'Djock – guitar
- Brice Wassy – shaker

== 2010 TED conference ==
David Byrne performed a briefer version of the song at the 2010 TED conference accompanied by Thomas Dolby on keyboard and the string quartet ETHEL.

== Charts ==
Chart (1988)	Peak position
Belgium (Ultratop 50 Flanders)	32
UK Singles (Official Charts)	79
US Mainstream Rock Airplay (Billboard)	5
