= This Must Be the Place (Naive Melody) =

Single by Talking Heads

from the album Speaking in Tongues
- B-side: "Moon Rocks"
- Released: November 1983
- Recorded: 1982
- Genre: Post-disco
- Length: 4:56 (LP version); 3:50 (Single version)
- Label: Sire
- Composers: David Byrne; Chris Frantz; Jerry Harrison; Tina Weymouth
- Lyricist: David Byrne
- Producer: Talking Heads

Talking Heads singles chronology
"Burning Down the House" (1983)	"This Must Be the Place (Naive Melody)" (1983)	"Slippery People" (1984)

Official audio
- "This Must Be the Place (Naive Melody)" on YouTube

"This Must Be the Place (Naive Melody)" is a song by American rock band Talking Heads. The closing track of their fifth studio album Speaking in Tongues, it was released in November 1983 by Sire Records as the second and final studio (Note: A live version of "Girlfriend Is Better", also from Speaking in Tongues, was released in 1984.) single from the album; a live version would be released as a single in 1986. The lyrics were written by frontman David Byrne, and the music was written by Byrne and the other members of the band, Chris Frantz, Tina Weymouth and Jerry Harrison.

Byrne intended the song to be a love song without the clichés of the genre. The parenthesized title refers to the simple ("naïve") construction of the song, which is framed on a sparse ostinato that lasts for the song's duration. This simplicity marked a departure for Talking Heads, whose recent work had been noted for its complex African-inspired polyrhythms and funk.

== Background ==
Speaking in Tongues, Talking Heads' fifth studio album, was released on June 1, 1983, by Sire Records. It was produced by the band themselves after the band had parted ways with longtime producer Brian Eno. This Must Be the Place is also the title of a 1965 lithograph by American pop artist Roy Lichtenstein.

== Composition ==
In the "Self Interview" on the DVD of the concert film Stop Making Sense (1984), Byrne states that it is a love song, a topic he tends to avoid because it is "kinda big." He also said of the song:

That's a love song made up almost completely of non sequiturs, phrases that may have a strong emotional resonance but don't have any narrative qualities. It's a real honest kind of love song. I don't think I've ever done a real love song before. Mine always had a sort of reservation, or a twist. I tried to write one that wasn't corny, that didn't sound stupid or lame the way many do. I think I succeeded; I was pretty happy with that.

According to the Stop Making Sense commentary track, the title "Naive Melody" refers to the music. On the recording, the guitar and bass each repeat an ostinato for the entire song. According to David Byrne, many professional musicians would not play a song written in that fashion, and that is what makes the melody naive. Byrne played the lead keyboard solo.

Bassist Tina Weymouth stated in the liner notes of Once in a Lifetime: The Best of Talking Heads (1992) that the song was created through "truly naive" experimentation with different instruments and jamming. Weymouth played guitar, guitarist Jerry Harrison played a Prophet-5 synthesiser (including the bassline), Wally Badarou used the same synthesizer to add the stabs, and Byrne switched between guitar and another Prophet-5 synthesizer, the latter of which he played using the pitch modulation wheel and "campy" piano glissandos.

Pitchfork later described the song as "an aberration for the Talking Heads. It was more of an exercise in understated musical hypnosis than polyrhythmic, Kuti-quoting funk, well-compressed instead of bursting at the seams, and (in its abashed way) it was a full-blown love song. [...] With 'This Must Be the Place', the band simplified their sound dramatically, condensing their sonic palette to the level of small EKG blips (having switched instruments for a lark, this was nearly all they were able to reliably deliver chops-wise) and wringing out only a few chords."

== Personnel ==
Talking Heads

- David Byrne – lead, harmony and background vocals; lead guitar; synthesizer
- Tina Weymouth – rhythm guitar
- Jerry Harrison – synth bass
- Chris Frantz – drums

Additional musicians

- Wally Badarou – synthesizer
- David Van Tieghem – percussion

== Stop Making Sense ==
The song is featured in Stop Making Sense (1984), a concert film featuring Talking Heads and directed by Jonathan Demme. Throughout the Stop Making Sense version, Byrne and his bandmates perform by a standard lamp, while close-up images of various body parts are projected onto a screen behind them. As revealed on the commentary to the film, the body parts belong to Byrne and his girlfriend (later wife) Adelle Lutz who was also known as Bonnie. When the song reaches a bridge, the musicians step back and Byrne dances with the lamp, a reference to Fred Astaire's similar dance with a coat-rack in the film Royal Wedding (1951). During the song, Weymouth is seen playing a rare Fender Swinger electric guitar, instead of her usual bass.

The Stop Making Sense version was released as a single in 1986, peaking at #100 on the UK Singles Chart.

== Critical reception ==
"This Must Be The Place" has since received widespread critical acclaim. In 2014, Pitchfork ranked the song at number 22 in their list of "The 200 Best Songs of the 1980s," with Winston Cook-Wilson of the website saying:

In the process of stripping down, Talking Heads showcased something at the root of their art: David Byrne’s inimitable gift for melody, and his unique ability to make every musical figure seem both familiar and tied directly to the lyrical thought (see "I feel numb...born with a weak heart/ I guess I must be having fun"). Is there a better moment of catharsis in a pop then [sic] the song's final eureka realization, after Byrne gets whacked with the monolithic spiritual hammer and awakes from a life-encompassing daze into unexpected stability? There’s nothing to narrow his eyes at anymore: "Cover up the blank spots, hit me on the head/ Aaoooh, aaooh, aaooh, aaoooh." For a band rarely given to addressing issues of the heart head-on, "Naive Melody" remains an unexpected and peerless achievement.

In 2021, it was listed at number 123 on Rolling Stone's 500 Greatest Songs of All Time. In 2023, American Songwriter ranked the song number two on their list of the 10 greatest Talking Heads songs, and in 2024, Paste ranked the song number one on their list of the 30 greatest Talking Heads songs.

== Music video ==
The official music video for "This Must Be the Place" depicts the extended band for the 1983–84 time period, including the Stop Making Sense film, watching light-hearted home movies, before going down into the basement to play their instruments.

The extra band members in this video are:

- Alex Weir – guitar; vocals (1983–1984) and on horseback in the home movie within this video
- Bernie Worrell – keyboards; backing vocals (1980–1984, 2002; died 2016) the Native American chief
- Steve Scales – percussion; backing vocals (1980–1984, 2002) the gentleman with the car
- Ednah Holt – vocals (1983–1984) the houseboat lady
- Lynn Mabry – vocals (1983–1984) the log cabin lady in the music video's home movie.

== Charts ==
=== Original version ===
Chart (1983–1984)	Peak position
UK Singles Chart	51
US Billboard Hot 100	62
US Cashbox Top 100	71

=== Live version ===
Chart (1986)	Peak position
UK Singles Chart	100

== Certifications ==
Region	Certification	Certified units/sales
New Zealand (RMNZ)	2× Platinum	60,000^{‡}
United Kingdom (BPI)	Platinum	600,000^{‡}
^{‡} Sales+streaming figures based on certification alone.
