= True Stories (Talking Heads album) =

Studio album by Talking Heads
- Released: September 15, 1986
- Recorded: February–June 1986
- Studios: Sigma Sound (New York City); O'Henry Sound (Toluca Lake, Los Angeles); Studio Southwest (Sunnyvale, Texas); The Arcadia Theater (Dallas, Texas)
- Genres: New wave; pop rock
- Length: 40:33
- Label: Sire
- Producer: Talking Heads

Talking Heads chronology
Little Creatures (1985)	True Stories (1986)	Naked (1988)

Singles from True Stories
- 1. "Wild Wild Life" Released: August 1986; 2. "Love for Sale" Released: November 1986; 3. "Puzzlin' Evidence" Released: 1986 (US); 4. "Hey Now" Released: 1986 (Australia); 5. "Radio Head" Released: April 1987

True Stories is the seventh studio album by the American rock band Talking Heads. It was released on September 15, 1986, by Sire Records, preceding lead vocalist David Byrne's related satirical musical comedy film True Stories.

== Content ==
The album includes only Talking Heads studio recordings of songs from the film; an original cast recording from the film was planned, but was not released at the time, although some actors' performances were featured on the B-sides of singles of songs drawn from the album. Later that year, Byrne released the album Sounds from True Stories containing incidental music from the soundtrack. In 2018, a complete film soundtrack album was finally released, combining cast performances from the film and tracks from the two previous albums; only those three performances by Talking Heads from the first True Stories album that are actually heard in the film were included.

The single "Wild Wild Life" became the most prominent hit from the album, accompanied by its video airplay on MTV. The "Wild Wild Life" video won two MTV Video Music Awards in 1987: "Best Group Video" and "Best Video from a Film" (the video is in fact an extended sequence lifted directly from the film itself). A video for "Love for Sale" was created for use in the film (during a sequence when a woman, played by Swoosie Kurtz, watches the video on a television), and an extended version was later released as a video in its own right.

In 2006, the album was re-released and remastered by Warner Music Group on their Warner Bros./Sire Records/Rhino Records labels in DualDisc format, with three bonus tracks on the CD side (an extended mix of "Wild Wild Life", "Papa Legba" with lead vocals by Pops Staples, and "Radio Head" with vocals by Tito Larriva). The DVD-Audio side includes both stereo and 5.1 surround high resolution (96 kHz/24bit) mixes, as well as a Dolby Digital version and the music videos of "Wild Wild Life" and "Love for Sale". In Europe, it was released as a CD+DVDA two disc set rather than a single DualDisc. The reissue was produced by Andy Zax with Talking Heads.

== Critical reception ==
Professional ratings
Review scores
Source	Rating
AllMusic	2.5/5 stars
Chicago Tribune	2/4 stars
The Encyclopedia of Popular Music	3/5 stars
The Philadelphia Inquirer	3/4 stars
The Rolling Stone Album Guide	2/5 stars
Spin Alternative Record Guide	6/10
Tom Hull – on the Web	B
Uncut	8/10
The Village Voice	B

From contemporary reviews, Ken Tucker of The Philadelphia Inquirer gave the album a three out of four stars rating, stating the album was "gently melodic pop, with little of the polyrhythmic aggressiveness that has characterized recent Talking Heads albums." Tucker found that "some of the songs verge on triteness or banality" but "Love for Sale" and "People Like Us" were "beautiful rock music."

== Track listing ==
All tracks are written by David Byrne.

Side one
No.	Title	Length
1.	"Love for Sale"	4:30
2.	"Puzzlin' Evidence"	5:23
3.	"Hey Now"	3:42
4.	"Papa Legba"	5:54

Side two
No.	Title	Length
5.	"Wild Wild Life"	3:39
6.	"Radio Head"	3:14
7.	"Dream Operator"	4:39
8.	"People Like Us"	4:26
9.	"City of Dreams"	5:06
Total length:		40:33

2006 reissue bonus tracks
No.	Title	Length
10.	"Wild Wild Life" (Extended Mix)	5:30
11.	"Papa Legba" (Pops Staples Vocal Version)	6:19
12.	"Radio Head" (Tito Larriva Vocal Version)	4:11

== Legacy ==
The English rock band Radiohead named themselves after the sixth track, "Radio Head".

== Personnel ==
Talking Heads

- David Byrne – lead and background vocals, guitar
- Chris Frantz – drums
- Jerry Harrison – keyboards, guitar, backing vocals
- Tina Weymouth – bass guitar, backing vocals

Additional musicians

- Bert Cross Choir – vocals on "Puzzlin' Evidence"
- Tommy Camfield – fiddle on "People Like Us"
- Paulinho da Costa – percussion on "Papa Legba", "Radio Head", and "People Like Us"
- Steve Jordan – accordion on "Radio Head"
- St. Thomas Aquinas Elementary School Choir – vocals on "Hey Now"
- Tommy Morrell – pedal steel guitar on "People Like Us" and "City of Dreams"

Production

- Charles Brocco – mixing assistance
- Paul Christiensen – overdubbing engineering on "Puzzlin' Evidence"
- Nick del Ray – engineering assistance
- Mick Guzauski – mixing on "Wild Wild Life"
- Lee Herschburg – mixing on "People Like Us"
- Robin Laine – mixing assistance
- Michael McClain – overdubbing engineering on "Hey Now", "Radio Head", "People Like Us", and "City of Dreams"
- Tom Nist – mixing assistance
- Jack Skinner – mastering
- Eric Thorngren – engineering, mixing, overdubbing
- Melanie West – engineering assistance

== Charts ==
=== Weekly charts ===
Weekly chart performance for True Stories
Chart (1986)	Peak position
Australian Albums (Kent Music Report)	2
Austrian Albums (Ö3 Austria)	10
Canada Top Albums/CDs (RPM)	16
Dutch Albums (Album Top 100)	16
European Albums (Music & Media)	8
Finnish Albums (Suomen virallinen lista)	19
German Albums (Offizielle Top 100)	13
Icelandic Albums (Tónlist)	1
Italian Albums (Musica e dischi)	17
Norwegian Albums (VG-lista)	13
New Zealand Albums (RMNZ)	1
Swedish Albums (Sverigetopplistan)	5
Swiss Albums (Schweizer Hitparade)	11
UK Albums (Official Charts)	7
US Billboard 200	17

Weekly chart performance for True Stories
Chart (2023)	Peak position
Croatian International Albums (HDU)	8
Hungarian Physical Albums (MAHASZ)	21

=== Year-end charts ===
Year-end chart performance for True Stories
Chart (1986)	Position
Australian Albums (Kent Music Report)	32
Canada Top Albums/CDs (RPM)	84
European Albums (Music & Media)	91
New Zealand Albums (RMNZ)	17

== Certifications ==
Certifications for True Stories
Region	Certification	Certified units/sales
New Zealand (RMNZ)	Platinum	15,000^{^}
United Kingdom (BPI)	Gold	100,000^{^}
United States (RIAA)	Gold	500,000^{^}
^{^} Shipments figures based on certification alone.
