= Talking Heads: 77 =

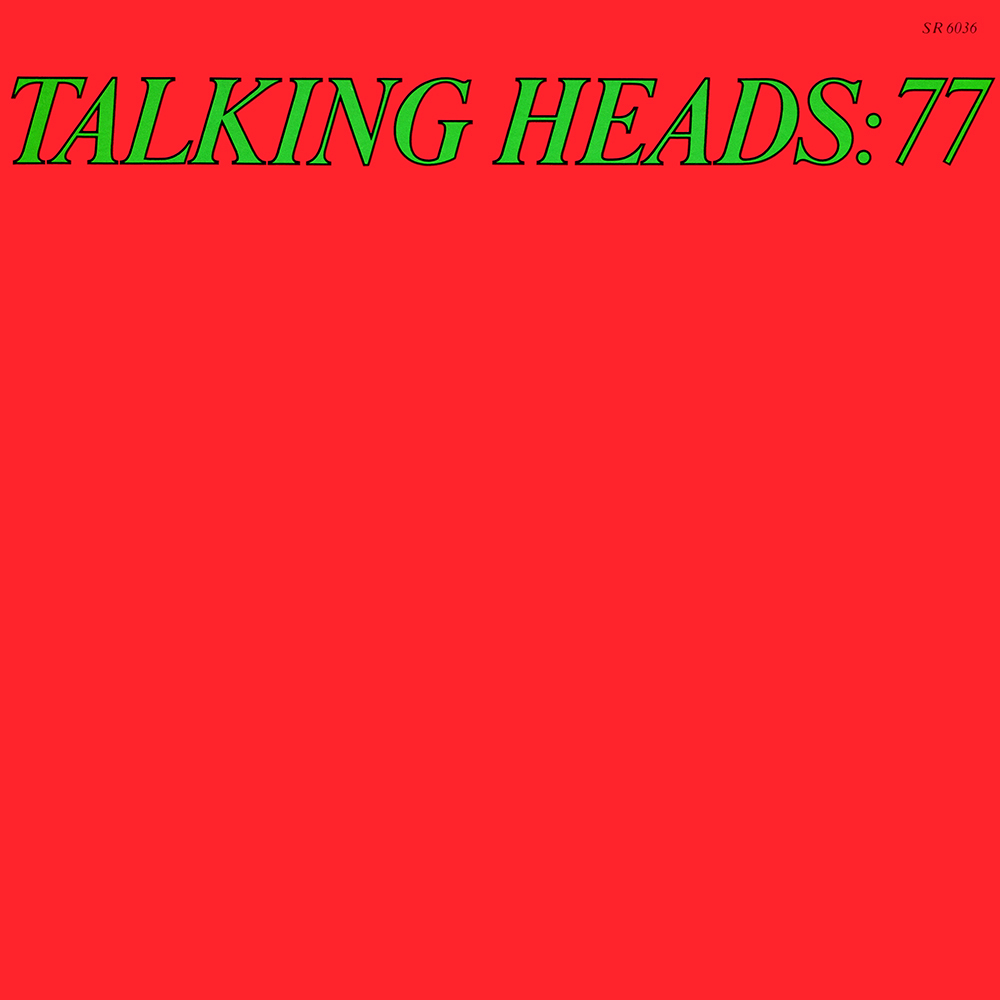

Studio album by Talking Heads
- Released: September 16, 1977
- Recorded: April–May, July 1977
- Studios: Sundragon (New York City); ODO (New York City)
- Genres: New wave; art rock; art punk
- Length: 38:37
- Label: Sire
- Producers: Tony Bongiovi; Lance Quinn; Talking Heads

Talking Heads chronology
Talking Heads: 77 (1977)	More Songs About Buildings and Food (1978)

Singles from Talking Heads 77
- 1. "Uh-Oh, Love Comes to Town" Released: September 1977; 2. "Psycho Killer" Released: December 1977; 3. "New Feeling" Released: 1977 (Australia); 4. "First Week/Last Week...Carefree" Released: 1977 (Netherlands); 5. "Pulled Up" Released: March 1978 (UK)

Talking Heads: 77 is the debut album by the American rock band Talking Heads, released on September 16, 1977, by Sire Records. The recording took place in April 1977 at New York's Sundragon Studios. The single "Psycho Killer" reached No. 92 on the U.S. Billboard Hot 100.

== Labels and demos ==
From the band's earliest days as a trio in 1975, Talking Heads were approached by several record labels for a potential album deal. The first person to approach the band was Mark Spector for Columbia Records, who saw Talking Heads perform at CBGB and invited them to record a demo album. Next would come Mathew Kaufman for Beserkley Records. Kaufman brought the trio to K&K Studios in Great Neck, Long Island, to record a three-song, 16-track demo tape containing "Artists Only", "Psycho Killer" and "First Week, Last Week". Kaufman was pleased with the results, but the band felt that they would need to improve drastically before re-entering a recording studio. The group also sent the Columbia demo to Arista Records, but when drummer Chris Frantz called Bob Feilden about it a few weeks later, he claimed the tape was lost.

In November 1975, Seymour Stein, cofounder of Sire Records, had heard Talking Heads open for the punk rock band Ramones. He liked the song "Love → Building on Fire", and the next day, offered a recording contract, but the band was still unsure about their studio abilities, and wanted a second guitarist as well as a keyboardist to help improve their sound. They agreed to let him know when they felt more confident.

A month later, Lou Reed, who had seen a few Talking Heads shows at CBGB, invited the trio to his New York apartment, where he began to critique the group's act, telling them to slow down "Tentative Decisions", which had originally been fast and bass-heavy. Reed also suggested to David Byrne that he never wear short sleeves on stage, in order to hide his hairy arms. Over breakfast at a local restaurant, Reed expressed a desire to produce the group's debut studio album and wanted to introduce them to his manager, Jonny Podell. That same day Podell called the trio to meet at his office, where he immediately offered them a recording contract.

To assist with the contracting, the group sought out assistance from lawyer Peter Parcher, a friend of Frantz's father. The next day, the trio visited Parcher's office, where Parcher asked his partner Alan Shulman to look over the contract. Shulman told the group not to sign the deal, or else Reed and Podell would own full rights to the album and collect all profit. Talking Heads declined the deal, but maintained a respectful relationship with Reed.

Around August 1976, Chris Frantz was given the telephone number of Jerry Harrison by former Modern Lovers bassist Ernie Brooks. Brooks assured Frantz that Harrison was not only a great keyboardist, but was a great guitarist too, two things the band were seeking out. When Frantz called Harrison, he was still feeling burnt out from the break-up of the original Modern Lovers and had just enrolled at a Harvard Graduate School, and was unsure about joining a new band. But after discovering that several labels were interested in signing the group, he agreed to see, and hear them play live. Frantz booked a concert local to Harrison in Cambridge, Massachusetts. When the group began to perform, they found Harrison nowhere in sight, but eventually saw him mid-set, seriously observing the band, and appearing displeased. After the show, Frantz asked Harrison what he had thought. Harrison did not answer until the next day, saying he was not impressed by the show, but was intrigued. He said he would like to do a jam session in New York but stipulated that he would not officially join until they had secured a recording deal.

During late September the group began to consider Sire Records again, and asked advice from Danny Fields, the Ramones' manager. Fields praised Sire despite them having the normal flaws of a record label. On November 1 the trio met with Seymour Stein again at Shulman's office, and signed a recording contract with Sire, with an advance allowing the trio to make music their full-time career.

== Recording ==
Sessions started at Sundragon Recording Studios in late 1976, where the group recorded the track "New Feeling" and the single, "Love → Building on Fire". Jerry Harrison was not present at these sessions, as he had not yet been informed that the group had received a recording contract. These sessions were produced by Tony Bongiovi and Tom Erdelyi. After hearing of the recording session, Harrison was eager to join, and in January 1977, the trio went to his apartment in Ipswich to teach him their songs and play a few shows in the area.

In April, sessions for the album proper began in earnest at Sundragon Studios, with the group finally a foursome. Tony Bongiovi and Lance Quinn acted as co-producers on these sessions, with Ed Stasium as engineer. Frantz claims that Stasium did most of the work on the album, while Bongiovi took phone calls, read magazines, or talked about airplanes. Bongiovi was dissatisfied with the group's performances, often asking for seven or eight takes of a song, even after the best take had already been recorded. The group felt that Bongiovi was condescending, and that he was trying to make them sound like a different band. He was also repeatedly rude to bassist Tina Weymouth. Stasium and Quinn were full of encouragement for the group.

The first song to have vocals recorded was "Psycho Killer". Allegedly, during recording of this track, Bongiovi went into the studio kitchen and gave Byrne a knife, telling him to get into character when singing. Byrne simply responded with "No, that's not going to work" and the band took a break. During the break Byrne confessed that he felt uncomfortable singing with Bongiovi watching, and asked Stasium to remove him. Stasium suggested evasion, recording when Bongiovi was not around, before he arrived, or after he left. Bongiovi allegedly never noticed they were doing this, being more concerned with the building of Power Station Studios.

The group wanted the album to "convey a modern message about the importance of taking charge of your own life", whilst still being fun to listen to.

Within two weeks the basic tracks were down, but still needed overdubs. Sessions were halted when Ken Kushnick, Sire's European representative, offered them a chance to tour Europe with the Ramones in order to promote their "Love → Building on Fire" single.

While on tour the group continued to develop their sound, and on May 14, performed at The Rock Garden in Covent Garden, London, where John Cale, Brian Eno and Chris Thomas saw them. Linda Stein, the Ramones' co-manager, brought Cale, Eno and Thomas backstage after the concert where they all shook hands. Thomas allegedly heard Cale say to Eno "They're mine, you bugger!" All members of Talking Heads already knew Cale fairly well, as he had produced Jerry Harrison in 1972 for The Modern Lovers (1976), and was a regular at CBGBs throughout the original trio's growth.

After the meeting they all went to The Speak Club to drink and discuss. Thomas declined the opportunity to replace Bongiovi as producer for the remaining album sessions. When the group returned to the U.S. on June 7, they booked a four-day recording session at ODO Studios in New York to record vocals and overdubs, as well as to mix the album. The album was finished.

== Release history ==
The album was released by Sire Records in the US/UK and by Philips Records throughout continental Europe.

In 2005, it was remastered and re-released by Warner Music Group on their Warner Bros./Sire Records/Rhino Records labels in DualDisc format with five bonus tracks on the CD side (see track listing below). The DVD-Audio side includes both stereo and 5.1 surround high resolution (96 kHz/24bit) mixes, as well as a Dolby Digital version and videos of the band performing "Pulled Up" and "I Feel It in My Heart". In Europe, it was released as a CD+DVDA two-disc set, rather than a single DualDisc. The reissue was produced by Andy Zax with Talking Heads.

The album was re-released on vinyl on April 18, 2009, for Record Store Day.

On November 8, 2024, an expanded and remastered deluxe edition of the album was released. The set contains various outtakes and unreleased material from the original album sessions, as well as an archived concert recording from October 10th, 1977. Prior to the release, "Psycho Killer" (Acoustic Version), a live version of "Uh-Oh, Love Comes To Town", and "Pulled Up" (Alternate Pop Version) were released as promotional singles.

== Critical reception ==
Retrospective professional ratings
Review scores
Source	Rating
AllMusic	5/5 stars
Chicago Tribune	3.5/4 stars
Christgau's Record Guide	A−
The Encyclopedia of Popular Music	4/5 stars
The Irish Times	5/5 stars
Mojo	3/5 stars
Pitchfork	8.6/10
The Rolling Stone Album Guide	3.5/5 stars
Spin Alternative Record Guide	9/10
Uncut	5/5 stars

Following its release, the album was described by Mark Kirkeby of Record Word as a new wave record "blending r&b, English rock and Asian influences in a complex, humane, humor- ou style that has few parallels."

Reviewing for The Village Voice in 1977, Robert Christgau said that while "a debut LP will often seem overrefined to habitues of a band's scene", the more he listened to the album the more he believed "the Heads set themselves the task of hurdling such limitations", and succeeded with 77:

Like Sparks, these are spoiled kids, but without the callowness or adolescent misogyny; like Yes, they are wimps, but without vagueness or cheap romanticism. Every tinkling harmony is righted with a screech, every self-help homily contextualized dramatically, so that in the end the record proves not only that the detachment of craft can coexist with a frightening intensity of feeling—something most artists know—but that the most inarticulate rage can be rationalized. Which means they're punks after all.

State News said in its review that Talking Heads plays "true avant-garde art rock that deals with love and good vibes."

Record World said the lead single "Uh-Oh, Love Comes to Town" is "an r&b-based song with interesting steel drum work."

The album's genre was described by Spin in 2007 by the question "punk goes to college?" The music journalist Ian Gittins categorized it as an art punk record.

Talking Heads: 77 was voted the year's seventh best album in The Village Voice's Pazz & Jop critics' poll.

In 2003, the album was ranked No. 290 on Rolling Stone's list of "The 500 Greatest Albums of All Time", and 291 in a 2012 revised list. The album was also included in the book 1001 Albums You Must Hear Before You Die (2006).

== Track listing ==
All tracks are written by David Byrne, except where noted

Side one
No.	Title	Length
1.	"Uh-Oh, Love Comes to Town"	2:48
2.	"New Feeling"	3:09
3.	"Tentative Decisions"	3:04
4.	"Happy Day"	3:55
5.	"Who Is It?"	1:41
6.	"No Compassion"	4:47
Total length:		19:24

Side two
No.	Title	Writer(s)	Length
1.	"The Book I Read"		4:06
2.	"Don't Worry About the Government"		3:00
3.	"First Week/Last Week…Carefree"		3:19
4.	"Psycho Killer"	Byrne; Chris Frantz; Tina Weymouth	4:19
5.	"Pulled Up"		4:29
Total length:			19:13

2005 CD bonus tracks
No.	Title	Writer(s)	Length
12.	"Love → Building on Fire" (non-album single)		3:00
13.	"I Wish You Wouldn't Say That" (B-side)		2:39
14.	"Psycho Killer" (Acoustic version) (B-side)	Byrne; Frantz; Weymouth	4:20
15.	"I Feel It in My Heart" (album outtake) (*)		3:15
16.	"Sugar on My Tongue" (1975 demo)		2:36
Total length:			55:06

=== 2024 Deluxe Edition ===
Disc one – Remastered Album
No.	Title	Length

Disc two – Outtakes/Alternates/Rarities
No.	Title	Writer(s)	Length
1.	"Sugar On My Tongue" (1975 demo)		2:36
2.	"I Want to Live" (1975 demo)		3:24
3.	"Love → Building on Fire" (non-album single)		2:59
4.	"I Wish You Wouldn't Say That" (B-side)		2:40
5.	"Psycho Killer" (Acoustic Version) (B-side)	Byrne; Frantz; Weymouth	4:18
6.	"Uh-Oh, Love Comes to Town" (Alternate Pop Version) (album outtake)		2:56
7.	"New Feeling" (Alternate Pop Version) (B-side)		3:03
8.	"Pulled Up" (Alternate Pop Version) (album outtake) (*)		4:35
9.	"Stay Hungry" (1977 Version) (album outtake)	Byrne; Frantz	3:45
10.	"First Week/Last Week...Carefree" (Acoustic Version) (album outtake)		3:26
11.	"I Feel It in My Heart" (album outtake)		3:15
12.	"Psycho Killer" (Alternate Version) (album outtake) (*)	Byrne; Frantz; Weymouth	5:02
Total length:			42:02

Disc three – Live at CBGB, New York, NY, 10/10/1977 (*)
No.	Title	Writer(s)	Length
1.	"Love → Building on Fire"		3:47
2.	"Uh-Oh, Love Comes To Town"		3:04
3.	"Don't Worry About the Government"		3:07
4.	"Take Me to the River"	Al Green; Mabon Hodges	5:20
5.	"The Book I Read"		4:34
6.	"New Feeling"		3:36
7.	"A Clean Break (Let's Work)"		4:57
8.	"No Compassion"		5:22
9.	"Thank You for Sending Me an Angel"		2:07
10.	"Who Is It?"		1:57
11.	"Pulled Up"		4:54
12.	"Psycho Killer"	Byrne; Frantz; Weymouth	5:54
13.	"Stay Hungry"	Byrne; Frantz	4:42
Total length:			53:20

Disc four – Blu-ray: Dolby Atmos, 5.1 and Hi-Resolution Stereo Mixes of the album
No.	Title	Length

- Bonus tracks marked with an asterisk (*) are previously unreleased.

== Personnel ==
Adapted from the album's liner notes.

Talking Heads

- David Byrne – guitar, lead vocals, production, cover art
- Chris Frantz – drums, steelpan, production
- Jerry Harrison – guitar, keyboards, backing vocals, production
- Tina Weymouth (credited as Martina Weymouth) – bass guitar, production

Additional musicians

- Lew Del Gatto – saxophone on "First Week/Last Week…Carefree"
- Jimmy Maelen – marimba on "First Week/Last Week…Carefree", percussion

Production

- Tony Bongiovi – producer
- Joe Gastwirt – mastering
- Lance Quinn – producer
- Mick Rock – photography
- Ed Stasium – engineer, mixing

Bonus tracks

- Brad Baker – horn arrangement on "Love → Building on Fire" and "New Feeling (Alternate Pop Version)"
- Tony Bongiovi – producer on all tracks, except "Sugar On My Tongue" and "I Want To Live"
- David Byrne – bells on "Love → Building on Fire"
- Bob Clearmountain – engineer on "Psycho Killer (Alternate Version)"
- Lew Del Gatto – saxophone on "Pulled Up (Alternate Pop Version)", "Love → Building on Fire" and "New Feeling (Alternate Pop Version)"
- T. Erdelyi – associate producer on "Love → Building on Fire" and "New Feeling (Alternate Pop Version)"
- Chris Frantz – tambourine on "Love → Building on Fire"
- Lou Marini – saxophone on "Love → Building on Fire" and "New Feeling (Alternate Pop Version)"
- Lance Quinn – producer on all tracks, except "Sugar On My Tongue", "I Want to Live", "Love → Building on Fire" and "New Feeling (Alternate Pop Version)"; horn arrangement on "Love → Building on Fire" and "New Feeling (Alternate Pop Version)"
- Arthur Russell – cello on "Psycho Killer (Acoustic Version)"
- Mark Spector – producer on "Sugar On My Tongue" and "I Want to Live"
- Ed Stasium – producer and mixing on disc 3; engineer on all tracks, except "Sugar On My Tongue", "I Want to Live" and "Psycho Killer (Alternate Version)"
- Talking Heads – producer on all tracks, except "Sugar On My Tongue", "I Want to Live", "Love → Building on Fire", "New Feeling (Alternate Pop Version)", and disc 3

== Charts ==
1978–1979 chart performance for Talking Heads: 77
Chart (1978–1979)	Peak position
New Zealand Albums (RMNZ)	21
UK Albums Chart	60
US Billboard 200	97

2024 chart performance for Talking Heads: 77
Chart (2024)	Peak position
Belgian Albums (Ultratop Flanders)	197
Hungarian Physical Albums (MAHASZ)	19

Chart performance for singles from Talking Heads: 77
Single	Chart	Year	Peak position
"Psycho Killer"	1978	US Billboard Hot 100	92

== Certifications ==
Region	Certification	Certified units/sales
United Kingdom (BPI)	Silver	60,000^{‡}
^{‡} Sales+streaming figures based on certification alone.
