= Speaking in Tongues (Talking Heads album) =

Studio album by Talking Heads
- Released: June 1, 1983
- Studios: Blank Tape (New York City); Sigma Sound (New York City); Compass Point (Nassau, Bahamas)
- Genres: New wave; funk rock; art rock; funk
- Length: 40:51 (LP); 46:56 (cassette)
- Label: Sire
- Producers: Talking Heads; Alex Sadkin

Talking Heads chronology
The Name of This Band Is Talking Heads (1982)	Speaking in Tongues (1983)	Stop Making Sense (1984)

Singles from Speaking in Tongues
- 1. "Burning Down the House" Released: July 1983; 2. "This Must Be the Place (Naive Melody)" Released: November 1983; 3. "Swamp" Released: December 1983 (NL and AUS); 4. "Slippery People / Making Flippy Floppy" Released: 1983

Special edition
- Special edition of the album

Speaking in Tongues is the fifth studio album by the American rock band Talking Heads, released on June 1, 1983, by Sire Records. After their split with producer Brian Eno and a short hiatus, which allowed the individual members to pursue side projects, recording began in 1982. It became the band's commercial breakthrough and produced the band's sole U.S. top-ten hit, "Burning Down the House", which reached No. 9 on the Billboard chart.

The album's tour was documented in the 1984 Jonathan Demme-directed concert film Stop Making Sense, which generated a live album of the same name. The album also crossed over to the dance charts, where it peaked at number two for six weeks. It is the band's highest-charting studio album on the U.S. Billboard 200, peaking at No. 15. It was also their biggest-selling album in Canada, where it was certified platinum in 1983.

== Artwork ==
Talking Heads' lead vocalist David Byrne designed the cover for the general release of the album. Artist Robert Rauschenberg won a Grammy Award for his work on the limited-edition LP version, which featured a clear vinyl disc in clear plastic packaging along with three clear plastic discs printed with similar collages in three colors. Byrne has said, as a partial explanation of the album's title, "I originally sang nonsense, and ... made words to fit that. That worked out all right."

== Release ==
Original cassette and later CD copies of the album have "extended versions" of "Making Flippy Floppy", "Girlfriend Is Better", "Slippery People", "I Get Wild/Wild Gravity" and "Moon Rocks". The album was re-released in February 2006 as a remastered DualDisc. It contains the extended versions of the songs found on the original cassette, and includes two additional tracks ("Two Note Swivel" and an alternate mix of "Burning Down the House"). The DVD-A side includes both stereo and 5.1 surround high resolution (96 kHz/24bit) mixes, as well as a Dolby Digital 5.1 version of the album, a new alternate version of "Burning Down the House", and the music videos for "Burning Down the House" and "This Must Be the Place (Naive Melody)" (videos are two-channel Dolby Digital only). In Europe it was released as a CD+DVDA two-disc set, rather than a single DualDisc. The reissue was produced by Andy Zax with Talking Heads.

In 2021, Rhino Entertainment re-released the album on sky blue vinyl.

== Critical reception ==
Professional ratings
Review scores
Source	Rating
AllMusic	4/5 stars
Chicago Tribune	3.5/4 stars
Mojo	4/5 stars
Pitchfork	8.5/10
Rolling Stone	4.5/5 stars
The Rolling Stone Album Guide	4/5 stars
Smash Hits	9/10
Spin Alternative Record Guide	7/10
Uncut	9/10
The Village Voice	A−

Rolling Stone's David Fricke lauded the album's crossover nature, calling it "the album that finally obliterates the thin line separating arty white pop music and deep black funk." He elaborated that the songs are all true art rock yet avoid the genre's common pretensions with a laid-back attitude and compelling dance rhythms, making it an ideal party album. For The Village Voice, critic Robert Christgau described the album as "quirkily comfortable," opining that without Brian Eno the band's rhythms sounded less portentous but also less meaningful. He added that "the disjoint opacity of the lyrics fails to conceal Byrne's confusion about what it all means", but praised the second side of the LP.

In a retrospective review for AllMusic, William Ruhlmann said that the album saw the band "open up the dense textures of the music they had developed with Brian Eno", and that they were "rewarded with their most popular album yet." He felt the additional musicians made the sound "more spacious, and the music admitted aspects of gospel," particularly on "Slippery People" and "Swamp". He noted Byrne's "impressionistic, nonlinear lyrics" and lauded the return of his "charming goofiness", calling the music "unusually light and bouncy."

In his book on funk music, Rickey Vincent describes Speaking in Tongues as "deeply thumping funk disguised as modern rock."

== Legacy ==
In 1989, Speaking in Tongues was ranked No. 54 on Rolling Stone's list of the 100 best albums of the 1980s. In 2012, Slant Magazine listed it as the 89th best album of the 1980s.

"Burning Down the House" was later covered by Welsh singer Tom Jones with the Cardigans, on his album Reload, reaching No. 7 on the UK singles chart. It has also been covered by screamo band the Used, pop-punk band Paramore, pop rock band Walk the Moon, blues singer Bonnie Raitt and R&B singer John Legend. The song has also appeared in the films Revenge of the Nerds (1984), The Banger Sisters (2002), 13 Going on 30 (2004), Nymphomaniac (2013), and the television series The Walking Dead.

"This Must Be the Place (Naive Melody)" has been covered by artists such as folk musicians the Lumineers and Iron & Wine, and indie rock band Arcade Fire. The song was also featured in the films Wall Street (1987), and its sequel, Wall Street: Money Never Sleeps (2010), Lars and the Real Girl (2007), He's Just Not That into You (2009), Crazy, Stupid, Love (2011), and the television series Little Fires Everywhere and Agents of S.H.I.E.L.D..

"Swamp" appears in the films The King of Comedy (1982), Risky Business (1983), and The Simpsons episode "3 Scenes Plus a Tag from a Marriage". "Girlfriend Is Better" appeared in an episode of the television series Entourage. "Slippery People" appeared in the film American Made (2017) and the television series The Americans.

In 2022, the song "Burning Down the House" was used as a sample in the song "Keep It Burning" from Donda 2 by Kanye West, featuring a performance by rapper Future. The song was removed from the album after a day and was released later that year on Future's ninth studio album I Never Liked You, under the same name, but without the sample.

== Track listing ==
=== LP/early CD version ===
All lyrics are written by David Byrne; all music is composed by Byrne, Chris Frantz, Jerry Harrison and Tina Weymouth.

Side one
No.	Title	Length
1.	"Burning Down the House"	4:01
2.	"Making Flippy Floppy"	4:34
3.	"Girlfriend Is Better"	4:22
4.	"Slippery People"	3:31
5.	"I Get Wild/Wild Gravity"	4:07
Total length:		20:35

Side two
No.	Title	Length
6.	"Swamp"	5:12
7.	"Moon Rocks"	5:03
8.	"Pull Up the Roots"	5:08
9.	"This Must Be the Place (Naive Melody)"	4:53
Total length:		20:16 (40:51)

=== Cassette/later CD versions ===
Side one
No.	Title	Length
1.	"Burning Down the House"	4:01
2.	"Making Flippy Floppy" (extended version)	5:54
3.	"Girlfriend is Better" (extended version)	5:44
4.	"Slippery People" (extended version)	5:05
5.	"I Get Wild/Wild Gravity" (extended version)	5:15
Total length:		25:59

Side two
No.	Title	Length
1.	"Swamp"	5:12
2.	"Moon Rocks" (extended version)	5:44
3.	"Pull Up the Roots"	5:08
4.	"This Must Be the Place (Naive Melody)"	4:53
Total length:		20:57 (46:56)

=== 2006 DualDisc reissue bonus tracks ===
No.	Title	Length
10.	"Two Note Swivel" (unfinished outtake)	5:51
11.	"Burning Down the House" (alternate version)	5:09
Total length:		57:56

== Personnel ==
Talking Heads

- David Byrne – vocals, guitars, keyboards, bass guitar, percussion
- Jerry Harrison – keyboards, guitars, backing vocals
- Tina Weymouth – synth bass, double bass, backing vocals, guitar
- Chris Frantz – drums, backing vocals, synthesizer

Additional musicians

- Wally Badarou – synthesizers (tracks 1, 6, 9)
- Bernie Worrell – synthesizers (track 3)
- Alex Weir – guitar (tracks 2, 6, 7, 8)
- Steve Scales – percussion (tracks 1, 7)
- Raphael Dejesus – percussion (tracks 4, 5, 8)
- David Van Tieghem – percussion (tracks 5, 9)
- L. Shankar – double violin (track 2)
- Richard Landry – saxophone (track 4)
- Nona Hendryx – backing vocals (track 4)
- Dolette McDonald – backing vocals (track 4)

Technical

- Talking Heads – production
- Butch Jones – recording
- John Convertino – recording assistant
- Alex Sadkin – co-production, overdubbing, mixing, head engineering
- Frank Gibson – overdubbing assistant, mix assistant
- Jay Mark – overdubbing assistant, mix assistant
- Ted Jensen – mastering at Sterling Sound (New York City, New York)
- Brian Kehew – 2006 DualDisc bonus mixes
- Robert Rauschenberg – limited edition cover art
- David Byrne – original cover design

== Charts ==
=== Weekly charts ===
Chart (1983–1984)	Peak position
Australian Albums (Kent Music Report)	15
Austrian Albums (Ö3 Austria)	20
Canada Top Albums/CDs (RPM)	7
Dutch Albums (Album Top 100)	14
Finnish Albums (Suomen virallinen lista)	27
German Albums (Offizielle Top 100)	10
Icelandic Albums (Tónlist)	6
New Zealand Albums (RMNZ)	3
Norwegian Albums (VG-lista)	11
Swedish Albums (Sverigetopplistan)	12
UK Albums (Official Charts)	21
US Billboard 200	15
US Rock Albums (Billboard)	11
US Top Black Albums (Billboard)	55

Chart (2026)	Peak position
Croatian International Albums (HDU)	21

=== Year-end charts ===
1983 year-end chart performance for Speaking in Tongues
Chart (1983)	Position
Canada Top Albums/CDs (RPM)	15
New Zealand Albums (RMNZ)	14
US Billboard 200	82

1984 year-end chart performance for Speaking in Tongues
Chart (1984)	Position
New Zealand Albums (RMNZ)	10
US Billboard 200	99

== Certifications ==
Certifications for Speaking in Tongues
Region	Certification	Certified units/sales
Canada (Music Canada)	Platinum	100,000^{^}
New Zealand (RMNZ)	Platinum	15,000^{^}
United Kingdom (BPI)	Gold	100,000^{‡}
United States (RIAA)	Platinum	1,000,000^{^}
^{^} Shipments figures based on certification alone.^{‡} Sales+streaming figures based on certification alone.

== See also ==
- List of 1980s albums considered the best
