= The Name of This Band Is Talking Heads =

- 2004 2-CD reissue cover

Live album by Talking Heads
- Released: March 24, 1982
- Recorded: November 17, 1977 – February 27, 1981
- Genres: New wave; funk; art punk
- Length: 81:37 (original album); 156:30 (expanded CD release)
- Labels: Sire; Rhino (reissue)
- Producer: Talking Heads

Talking Heads chronology
| Remain in Light (1980) | The Name of This Band Is Talking Heads (1982) | Speaking in Tongues (1983) |

Singles from The Name of This Band Is Talking Heads
- 1. "Life During Wartime" Released: 1982; 2. "Love → Building on Fire / I Zimbra" Released: 1982 (France); 3. "Take Me to the River / Air" Released: 1982 (Netherlands)

Professional ratings
Review scores
| Source | Rating |
|---|---|
| AllMusic | 4.5/5 stars |
| Blender | 4/5 stars |
| Entertainment Weekly | A |
| Mojo | 4/5 stars |
| Pitchfork | 9.2/10 |
| Rolling Stone | 4/5 stars |
| The Rolling Stone Album Guide | 4/5 stars |
| Spin Alternative Record Guide | 8/10 |
| Uncut | 5/5 stars |
| The Village Voice | A− |

The Name of This Band Is Talking Heads is a double live album by the American new wave band Talking Heads, released on March 24, 1982, by Sire Records. The first LP features the original quartet in concert and radio recordings in 1977 and 1979, and the second LP features the expanded ten-piece lineup that toured in 1980 and 1981.

Though a decent commercial and critical success upon release, The Name of This Band was somewhat overshadowed by Talking Heads' subsequent live album and concert film Stop Making Sense. However, it went on to attract greater retrospective acclaim, with critics remarking on its importance in documenting the band's artistic growth.

== Reissues ==
An expanded version of the record was released on CD in 2004 by Sire/Warner Bros./Rhino, marking the album's first ever CD release in the United States. It duplicated the pattern of the original album, with the first disc featuring the quartet alone and the second disc the ten-member band. Eight additional performances from 1978 and 1979 were added to the first disc, and seven additional tracks from the 1980–81 tour were added to the second disc, with the latter disc featuring a reconfigured running order reflecting the tour's set list from the larger band. However, the introduction to the song "Crosseyed and Painless" was edited out on this CD version. The expanded CD version of the album contains two versions of the songs "Psycho Killer" and "Stay Hungry."

In 2013, Rhino reissued the vinyl version of the album (on the original Sire label), again without bonus tracks, but with the longer version of "Crosseyed and Painless". The original design of the packaging was also replicated, but the LPs were packaged in plastic sleeves. The album also utilized the original analog mastering for the LP from 1982.

== Track listing ==
=== Original LP (1982) ===
Information sourced from original 1982 LP liner notes and 2004 CD reissue liner notes.

All tracks are written by David Byrne, unless otherwise noted.

Side one (1977)
| No. | Title | Writer(s) | Recording info | Length |
|---|---|---|---|---|
| 1. | "New Feeling" | | WCOZ broadcast, Northern Studio, Maynard, Massachusetts; November 17, 1977 | 3:10 |
| 2. | "A Clean Break (Let's Work)" | | WCOZ broadcast, Northern Studio, Maynard, Massachusetts; November 17, 1977 | 4:57 |
| 3. | "Don't Worry About the Government" | | WCOZ broadcast, Northern Studio, Maynard, Massachusetts; November 17, 1977 | 3:08 |
| 4. | "Pulled Up" | | WCOZ broadcast, Northern Studio, Maynard, Massachusetts; November 17, 1977 | 4:08 |
| 5. | "Psycho Killer" | Byrne, Chris Frantz, Tina Weymouth | WCOZ broadcast, Northern Studio, Maynard, Massachusetts; November 17, 1977 | 5:34 |
| Total length: | | | | 20:57 |

Side two (1979)
| No. | Title | Writer(s) | Recording info | Length |
|---|---|---|---|---|
| 1. | "Artists Only" | Byrne, Wayne Zieve | Capitol Theater, Passaic, New Jersey; November 17th, 1979 | 3:48 |
| 2. | "Stay Hungry" | Byrne, Frantz | Capitol Theater, Passaic, New Jersey; November 17th, 1979 | 4:00 |
| 3. | "Air" | | Capitol Theater, Passaic, New Jersey; November 17th, 1979 | 4:09 |
| 4. | "Love → Building on Fire" | | Capitol Theater, Passaic, New Jersey; November 17th, 1979 | 3:36 |
| 5. | "Memories (Can't Wait)" | Byrne, Jerry Harrison | Capitol Theater, Passaic, New Jersey; November 17th, 1979 | 3:58 |
| Total length: | | | | 19:31 (40:28) |

Side three (1980)
| No. | Title | Writer(s) | Recording info | Length |
|---|---|---|---|---|
| 1. | "I Zimbra" | Byrne, Brian Eno, Hugo Ball | Emerald City, Cherry Hill, New Jersey; November 8–9, 1980 | 3:33 |
| 2. | "Drugs" | | Emerald City, Cherry Hill, New Jersey; November 8–9, 1980 | 4:47 |
| 3. | "Houses in Motion" | Byrne, Eno, Frantz, Harrison, Weymouth | Emerald City, Cherry Hill, New Jersey; November 8–9, 1980 | 7:00 |
| 4. | "Life During Wartime" | | Central Park, New York City, New York; August 27, 1980 | 5:03 |
| Total length: | | | | 20:23 |

Side four (1980)
| No. | Title | Writer(s) | Recording info | Length |
|---|---|---|---|---|
| 1. | "The Great Curve" | Byrne, Eno, Frantz, Harrison, Weymouth | Central Park, New York City, New York; August 27, 1980 | 6:58 |
| 2. | "Crosseyed and Painless" | Byrne, Eno, Frantz, Harrison, Weymouth | Emerald City, Cherry Hill, New Jersey; November 8–9, 1980 | 7:05 |
| 3. | "Take Me to the River" | Al Green, Mason Hodges | Central Park, New York City, New York; August 27, 1980 | 6:43 |
| Total length: | | | | 20:46 (41:09) (81:37) |

=== CD reissue (2004) ===
All tracks are written by David Byrne, unless otherwise noted.

Disc one
| No. | Title | Writer(s) | Recording info | Length |
|---|---|---|---|---|
| 1. | "New Feeling" | | WCOZ broadcast, Northern Studio, Maynard, Massachusetts; November 17, 1977 | 3:09 |
| 2. | "A Clean Break (Let's Work)" | | WCOZ broadcast, Northern Studio, Maynard, Massachusetts; November 17, 1977 | 5:05 |
| 3. | "Don't Worry About the Government" | | WCOZ broadcast, Northern Studio, Maynard, Massachusetts; November 17, 1977 | 3:03 |
| 4. | "Pulled Up" | | WCOZ broadcast, Northern Studio, Maynard, Massachusetts; November 17, 1977 | 4:04 |
| 5. | "Psycho Killer" | Byrne, Weymouth, Frantz | WCOZ broadcast, Northern Studio, Maynard, Massachusetts; November 17, 1977 | 5:31 |
| 6. | "Who Is It?" | | WCOZ broadcast, Northern Studio, Maynard, Massachusetts; November 17, 1977; bonus track, previously unissued | 1:44 |
| 7. | "The Book I Read" | | WCOZ broadcast, Northern Studio, Maynard, Massachusetts; November 17, 1977; bonus track, previously unissued | 4:22 |
| 8. | "The Big Country" | | WXRT broadcast, the Park West, Chicago, Illinois; August 23, 1978; bonus track, previously unissued | 5:09 |
| 9. | "I'm Not in Love" | | KSAN broadcast, the Boarding House, San Francisco, California; September 16, 1978; bonus track, previously unissued | 4:57 |
| 10. | "The Girls Want to Be With the Girls" | | The Agora, Cleveland, Ohio; December 18, 1978; bonus track, previously issued on Live on Tour: The Warner Bros. Music Show (1979) | 3:44 |
| 11. | "Electricity (Drugs)" | | The Agora, Cleveland, Ohio; December 18, 1978; bonus track, previously issued on Live on Tour: The Warner Bros. Music Show (1979) | 3:28 |
| 12. | "Found a Job" | | The Agora, Cleveland, Ohio; December 18, 1978; bonus track, previously issued on Live on Tour: The Warner Bros. Music Show (1979) | 5:35 |
| 13. | "Mind" | | WBCN broadcast, Berklee Performance Center, Boston, Massachusetts; August 24, 1979; bonus track, previously unissued | 4:55 |
| 14. | "Artists Only" | Byrne, Zieve | Capitol Theater, Passaic, New Jersey; November 17, 1979 | 3:49 |
| 15. | "Stay Hungry" | Byrne, Frantz | Capitol Theater, Passaic, New Jersey; November 17, 1979 | 4:05 |
| 16. | "Air" | | Capitol Theater, Passaic, New Jersey; November 17, 1979 | 4:01 |
| 17. | "Love → Building on Fire" | | Capitol Theater, Passaic, New Jersey; November 17, 1979 | 3:47 |
| 18. | "Memories (Can't Wait)" | Byrne, Harrison | Capitol Theater, Passaic, New Jersey; November 17, 1979 | 3:44 |
| 19. | "Heaven" | Byrne, Harrison | Capitol Theater, Passaic, New Jersey; November 17, 1979; bonus track, previously unissued | 4:31 |
| Total length: | | | | 78:43 |

Disc two
| No. | Title | Writer(s) | Recording info | Length |
|---|---|---|---|---|
| 1. | "Psycho Killer" | Byrne, Weymouth, Frantz | Sun Plaza Concert Hall, Tokyo, Japan; February 27, 1981; bonus track, previously unissued | 5:33 |
| 2. | "Warning Sign" | Byrne, Frantz | Sun Plaza Concert Hall, Tokyo, Japan; February 27, 1981; bonus track, previously unissued | 5:40 |
| 3. | "Stay Hungry" | Byrne, Frantz | Sun Plaza Concert Hall, Tokyo, Japan; February 27, 1981; bonus track, previously unissued | 3:56 |
| 4. | "Cities" | | Emerald City, Cherry Hill, New Jersey; November 8–9, 1980 | 5:00 |
| 5. | "I Zimbra" | Byrne, Eno, Ball | Emerald City, Cherry Hill, New Jersey; November 8–9, 1980 | 3:30 |
| 6. | "Drugs (Electricity)" | Byrne | Emerald City, Cherry Hill, New Jersey; November 8–9, 1980 | 4:41 |
| 7. | "Once in a Lifetime" | Byrne, Eno, Frantz, Harrison, Weymouth | Sun Plaza Concert Hall, Tokyo, Japan; February 27, 1981; bonus track, previously unissued | 5:57 |
| 8. | "Animals" | | Sun Plaza Concert Hall, Tokyo, Japan; February 27, 1981; bonus track, previously unissued | 4:05 |
| 9. | "Houses in Motion" | Byrne, Eno, Frantz, Harrison, Weymouth | Emerald City, Cherry Hill, New Jersey; November 8–9, 1980 | 6:54 |
| 10. | "Born Under Punches (The Heat Goes On)" | Byrne, Eno, Frantz, Harrison, Weymouth | Sun Plaza Concert Hall, Tokyo, Japan; February 27, 1981; bonus track, previously unissued | 8:24 |
| 11. | "Crosseyed and Painless" | Byrne, Eno, Frantz, Harrison, Weymouth | Emerald City, Cherry Hill, New Jersey, November 8–9, 1980; truncated version from original release | 5:58 |
| 12. | "Life During Wartime" | Byrne, Frantz, Harrison, Weymouth | Central Park, New York City, New York; August 27, 1980 | 4:54 |
| 13. | "Take Me to the River" | Green, Hodges | Central Park, New York City, New York; August 27, 1980 | 6:33 |
| 14. | "The Great Curve" | Byrne, Eno, Frantz, Harrison, Weymouth | Central Park, New York City, New York; August 27, 1980 | 6:42 |
| Total length: | | | | 77:47 (156:30) |

== Personnel ==
Talking Heads

- David Byrne – guitar, vocals
- Chris Frantz – drums
- Tina Weymouth – bass guitar, synthesizer, percussion, backing vocals
- Jerry Harrison – guitar, piano, keyboards, synthesizer, backing vocals

Additional musicians

- Adrian Belew – guitar, backing vocals
- Nona Hendryx – backing vocals on "Life During Wartime", "Take Me to the River", and "The Great Curve"
- Busta "Cherry" Jones – additional bass guitar
- Dolette McDonald – percussion, backing vocals
- Steve Scales – congas, percussion
- Bernie Worrell – keyboards, backing vocals

Technical

- Talking Heads – producer, mixing assistant
- David Hewett – audio engineer
- Kooster McAllister – engineer
- Rod O'Brien – engineer
- Katshuiko Sato – engineer
- Brian Eno – assistant engineer
- Ed Stasium – mixing engineer
- Butch Jones – mixing assistant
- Clive Brinkwood – mastering engineer
- Greg Calbi – mastering engineer
- Jeff Shaw – mastering engineer

Reissue personnel

- Gary Stewart – producer
- Andy Zax – producer
- Dave Artale – mixing engineer
- Ken Rasek – mixing engineer
- Bob Ludwig – remastering engineer

== Charts ==
| Chart (1982) | Peak position |
|---|---|
| Australia (Kent Music Report) | 41 |
| Billboard Pop Albums | 31 |

| Chart (2013) | Peak position |
|---|---|
| Hungarian Albums (MAHASZ) | 16 |
