= Heatwave (festival) =

Rock festival

- Heatwave promotional poster
- Genre: Electronic music, new wave, rock
- Dates: August 23, 1980
- Locations: Mosport Park, north of Orono, Ontario
- Years active: 1980
- Attendance: 85,000+

Heatwave was a rock music festival held on August 23, 1980, at Mosport Park near Orono, Ontario, Canada.

== History ==
Approximately 85,000 people attended the festival, with tickets priced at $20 or $25 at the gate. Dan Aykroyd, in character as Elwood Blues, invited radio listeners to join the event for free on his guest list. An additional 15,000 people arrived, bringing the crowd to nearly 100,000 as Talking Heads took the stage.

The event faced issues, including accusations between the backers and park management, with claims that ticket stubs were discarded. The festival reportedly lost one million dollars.

The entire concert was recorded, though no rights agreements were signed. The tapes resurfaced later in 1980 and were secured by promoter John Brower. In the mid-1990s, Brower entrusted the tapes to Canadian record executive Jan Haust for restoration. By 2017, 102 tracks from five of the bands were available on Wolfgang's website. A video of The Kings' set was also released.

Creem magazine covered the festival, noting the novelty of a new wave/punk festival, as many of the bands typically performed in clubs rather than outdoor venues.

== Line-up ==
The festival's line-up included Vladymir Rogov with ARKITEX, Teenage Head, BB Gabor, Holly and the Italians, Rockpile featuring Dave Edmunds and Nick Lowe, The Rumour (without Graham Parker), The B-52's, Talking Heads, The Pretenders, Elvis Costello and the Attractions, and The Kings. The Clash were originally booked and listed on the poster but canceled.

=== Teenage Head set list ===
A reviewer described Teenage Head as "two scraggly guys playing guitar and bass, and a crop-haired singer in a long-tailed livery coat and eyeliner," noting their performance as "good ol' head-banging ramalama punk rock." The band had a large and vocal following and played with confidence, as if they belonged in front of a big crowd. A year later, Teenage Head's live album featured a picture from their Heatwave set on the cover.

1. Top Down
2. Wild One
3. Picture My Face
4. Some Kinda Fun
5. Little Boxes (Alimony)
6. Fist to Face (Everybody's Growin' Old)
7. Let's Shake
8. Lucy Potato
9. Brand New Cadillac
10. You're Tearing Me Apart
11. Somethin' Else
12. Kissin' The Carpet
13. Disgusteen
14. C'mon Everybody

=== The Pretenders set list ===
1. Precious
2. The Adultress
3. Kid
4. Space Invader
5. Private Life
6. Brass in Pocket
7. Stop Your Sobbing
8. The Wait
9. Louie Louie
10. Porcelain
11. Tattooed Love Boys
12. Up the Neck
13. Audience
14. Mystery Achievement

=== The B-52's set list ===
The B-52's performed material from their first album and debuted songs from Wild Planet.

1. Planet Claire
2. 6060-842
3. Devil In My Car
4. 52 Girls
5. Quiche Lorraine
6. Dirty Back Road
7. Lava
8. Give Me Back My Man
9. Strobe Light
10. Private Idaho
11. Runnin' Around
12. Rock Lobster
13. Dance This Mess Around
14. Party Out of Bounds

=== Talking Heads set list ===
The Talking Heads line-up that toured for the Remain in Light album made its debut at the festival. Their set began with the four original members plus Adrian Belew, and as the performance progressed, additional musicians and vocalists joined, including Nona Hendryx, Busta Jones, Steve Scales, Dolette McDonald, and Bernie Worrell.

1. Psycho Killer
2. Warning Sign
3. Stay Hungry
4. Cities
5. I Zimbra
6. Once in a Lifetime
7. Houses in Motion
8. Born Under Punches (The Heat Goes On)
9. Crosseyed and Painless
10. Life During Wartime
11. Take Me to the River

=== Elvis Costello set list ===
The festival was the only 1980 live concert in North America by Elvis Costello and the Attractions. The performance was recorded and released as a two-LP album.

1. Shot With His Own Gun (sometimes listed as "How does it Feel")
2. Accidents Will Happen
3. The Beat
4. Temptation
5. (What's So Funny 'Bout) Peace, Love, and Understanding
6. Mystery Dance
7. Green Shirt
8. You'll Never Be a Man
9. (I Don't Want to Go to) Chelsea
10. Secondary Modern
11. Pump It Up
12. Lover's Walk
13. Less Than Zero
14. Big Tears
15. High Fidelity
16. Lipstick Vogue
17. Radio Radio
18. I Can't Stand Up for Falling Down
19. Alison
20. Clubland
21. Oliver's Army
22. Watching the Detectives
23. You Belong to Me

=== The Kings ===
The Kings set began around midnight and lasted approximately one hour.

1. Borrowing Time
2. Don't Let Me Know
3. Run Shoes Running
4. My Habit
5. This Beat Goes On/Switchin' to Glide
6. Partyitis
7. California Girls
8. One Day Off
9. Go Away

== See also ==
- List of historic rock festivals
- List of punk rock festivals
