= The Best of Talking Heads =

Greatest hits album by Talking Heads
- Released: August 17, 2004
- Recorded: 1977–1988
- Genres: New wave; art rock; pop rock
- Length: 77:15
- Labels: Sire; Warner Bros.; Rhino
- Producers: Talking Heads; Andy Zax; Gary Stewart

Talking Heads chronology
| Once in a Lifetime (2003) | The Best of Talking Heads (2004) | Talking Heads (2005) |

Professional ratings
Review scores
| Source | Rating |
|---|---|
| AllMusic | 4.5/5 stars |
| Sputnikmusic | 3.6/5 stars |

The Best of Talking Heads is a greatest hits album by American rock band Talking Heads, released on August 17, 2004 by Sire, Warner Bros. Records, and Rhino Entertainment.

== Track listing ==
All lyrics are written by David Byrne, except where noted.

| No. | Title | Writer(s) | Origin | Length |
|---|---|---|---|---|
| 1. | "Love → Building on Fire" | | Non-album single, 1977 | 2:58 |
| 2. | "Psycho Killer" | Byrne; Chris Frantz; Tina Weymouth | Talking Heads: 77, 1977 | 4:20 |
| 3. | "Uh-Oh, Love Comes to Town" | | Talking Heads: 77 | 2:50 |
| 4. | "Take Me to the River" | Al Green; Mabon "Teenie" Hodges | More Songs About Buildings and Food, 1978 | 5:04 |
| 5. | "Found a Job" | | More Songs About Buildings and Food | 5:01 |
| 6. | "Life During Wartime" | Byrne; Frantz; Jerry Harrison; Weymouth | Fear of Music, 1979 | 3:41 |
| 7. | "Heaven" | Byrne; Harrison | Fear of Music | 4:02 |
| 8. | "Memories Can't Wait" | Byrne; Harrison | Fear of Music | 3:31 |
| 9. | "Once in a Lifetime" | Byrne; Brian Eno; Frantz; Harrison; Weymouth | Remain in Light, 1980 | 4:20 |
| 10. | "Houses in Motion" | Byrne; Eno; Frantz; Harrison; Weymouth | Remain in Light | 4:31 |
| 11. | "This Must Be the Place (Naive Melody)" | Byrne; Frantz; Harrison; Weymouth | Speaking in Tongues, 1983 | 4:56 |
| 12. | "Girlfriend Is Better" | Byrne; Frantz; Harrison; Weymouth | Speaking in Tongues | 5:46 |
| 13. | "Burning Down the House" | Byrne; Frantz; Harrison; Weymouth | Speaking in Tongues | 4:03 |
| 14. | "Road to Nowhere" | Byrne; Frantz; Harrison; Weymouth | Little Creatures, 1985 | 4:20 |
| 15. | "And She Was" | | Little Creatures | 3:39 |
| 16. | "Wild Wild Life" | | True Stories, 1986 | 3:41 |
| 17. | "Blind" | Byrne; Frantz; Harrison; Weymouth | Naked, 1988 | 5:00 |
| 18. | "(Nothing But) Flowers" | Byrne; Frantz; Harrison; Weymouth | Naked | 5:32 |
| Total length: | | | | 77:15 |

== Personnel ==
=== Talking Heads ===
- David Byrne – lead vocals, guitar
- Jerry Harrison – keyboards, guitar, backing vocal
- Chris Frantz – drums, backing vocals
- Tina Weymouth – bass, backing vocals

== Charts ==
2004 chart performance of The Best of Talking Heads
| Chart (2004) | Position |
|---|---|
| Belgian Albums (Ultratop Flanders) | 96 |
| UK Albums (Official Charts) | 30 |

2015 chart performance of The Best of Talking Heads
| Chart (2015) | Position |
|---|---|
| Australian Albums (ARIA) | 87 |

== Certifications ==
| Region | Certification | Certified units/sales |
|---|---|---|
| United Kingdom (BPI) | Platinum | 300,000^{‡} |
^{‡} Sales+streaming figures based on certification alone.
