= Born Under Punches (The Heat Goes On) =

- Japanese vinyl single

Single by Talking Heads

from the album Remain in Light
- B-side: "Cities (live version)"
- Released: August 1981
- Recorded: July – August 1980
- Genre: New wave; funk; world; electronica; post-punk
- Length: 5:46
- Label: Sire
- Composers: David Byrne; Chris Frantz; Jerry Harrison; Tina Weymouth; Brian Eno
- Lyricists: David Byrne; Brian Eno
- Producers: Talking Heads; Brian Eno

Official audio
- "Born Under Punches (The Heat Goes On)" on YouTube

"Born Under Punches (The Heat Goes On)" is a song by the American rock band Talking Heads. It is the first track on their fourth studio album Remain in Light (1980).

== Composition and recording ==
The track has a prominent bassline and sets the funk tone of the album. It incorporates elements of African music, continuing an approach used in an earlier Talking Heads song, "I Zimbra".

The solo was performed by David Byrne using a Lexicon Prime Time delay unit and was recorded piece by piece, with each part speed-manipulated upon playback. However, during live performances, the solo was played by Adrian Belew, who performed with the band on the album and its subsequent tour.

== Critical reception ==
AllMusic critic Bill Janovitz describes the song's protagonist as being "another alienated, lost soul seeing a world filtered through his delusions and paranoia," similar to the protagonists in other Talking Heads songs. Janovitz points to the following lyrics to support his assessment:

A government man
Born under punches
I'm a tumbler..I am not drowning man
And I am not a burning building...I'm so thin

Author Ian Gittens also characterizes the song's persona as being unstable, describing the song as being about "a harassed and apparently unstable 'Government Man'". Janovitz claims that the "thick menage of polyrhythmic percussion, staccato guitars, popping bass, and Devo-like electronic blips and bleeps" make this protagonist even more threatening than the one in an earlier Talking Heads song, "Psycho Killer". Gittens likewise concurs that the contrast with "warmth and gravitas" of the "humane backing" deepens the impression of the song's I-persona as being unstable. Janovitz notes Byrne's vocal performance in speaking and shouting his bitter lines and threats through the complex music. Gittens particularly praises Brian Eno's production, stating that the way Eno layered the multiple guitar, bass guitar and drum parts gave the song an "original, sharply conceived and imposingly textured" sound.

"Born Under Punches" was named as one of the best songs released between 1980 and 1982 in the 2008 book The Pitchfork 500: Our Guide to the Greatest Songs from Punk to the Present.

== Release history ==
A medley of "Born Under Punches (The Heat Goes On)" with two other songs from Remain in Light, "Crosseyed and Painless" and "Once in a Lifetime", reached No. 20 on the U.S. Billboard Dance Club Songs chart. The song was released as a single in Japan. The single's B-side track is a live performance of "Cities" from the August 24, 1979 concert at the Berklee Performance Center.

An 8:24 extended live version appears on the 2004 reissue of The Name of This Band Is Talking Heads (1982).

The song was included as the first track on Röyksopp's mix album Back to Mine (2007).
