= Bonus Rarities and Outtakes =

Compilation album by Talking Heads
- Released: February 8, 2006
- Recorded: 1976–1988
- Genre: New wave; art punk
- Length: 77:25
- Label: Sire; Warner Bros.; Rhino; Atlantic
- Producer: Tony Bongiovi; Brian Eno; Steve Lillywhite; Lance Quinn

Talking Heads chronology
Talking Heads (2005)	Bonus Rarities and Outtakes (2006)

Bonus Rarities and Outtakes is a compilation album by American rock band Talking Heads. It was released for download on the iTunes Store on February 8, 2006. As of January 2009 it was also available via the Amazon mp3 store. As of May 2020 it was also available as a lossless FLAC download from the 7Digital US store.

== Track listing ==
1. "I Want to Live" – 3:23
2. "New Feeling" (Alternate Version) – 3:14
3. "First Week/Last Week…Carefree" (Acoustic Version) – 3:37
4. "A Clean Break (Let's Work)" (Live at CBGB's, 10/10/77) – 5:01
5. "These Boots Are Made for Walkin'" (David Byrne Solo Acoustic Version) – 1:05
6. "I'm Not Ready Yet" (David Byrne Solo Acoustic Version) – 0:58
7. "Thank You for Sending Me an Angel" (Alternate Version) – 2:11
8. "Warning Sign" (Alternate Version) – 4:18
9. "Artists Only" (Alternate Version) – 5:13
10. "Electricity" (Instrumental) – 3:24
11. "Drugs" (Alternate Version) – 3:39
12. "I Zimbra" (12" Version) – 3:56
13. "Crosseyed and Painless" (Alternate Version) – 7:15
14. "The Lady Don't Mind" (Moog March Version) – 6:18
15. "People Like Us" (John Goodman Vocal Version) – 4:30
16. "Gangster of Love" (LP Version) – 4:29
17. "Lifetime Piling Up" (Remastered) – 3:53
18. "Popsicle" – 5:19
