= Talking Heads (album) =

Box set by Talking Heads
- Released: October 4, 2005
- Recorded: 1977–1992
- Genres: Rock; new wave
- Length: 339:41
- Labels: Sire; Warner Bros.; Rhino
- Producers: Talking Heads; Tony Bongiovi; Lance Quinn; Brian Eno; Steve Lillywhite; Mark Spector

Talking Heads chronology
The Best of Talking Heads (2004)	Talking Heads (2005)	Bonus Rarities and Outtakes (2006)

Professional ratings
Review scores
Source	Rating
AllMusic	4.5/5 stars
Pitchfork Media	(9.1/10)

Talking Heads (also known as Brick) is a box set by American rock band Talking Heads, containing the band's eight studio albums in DVD-Audio format on DualDiscs with videos and previously unreleased material. Remixed by Jerry Harrison in MLP (aka Advanced Resolution) 5.1 surround sound, Brick is the first DualDisc release of an artist's entire back catalogue. The albums included in Brick are:

- Talking Heads: 77, originally released 1977
- More Songs About Buildings and Food, originally released 1978
- Fear of Music, originally released 1979
- Remain in Light, originally released 1980
- Speaking in Tongues, originally released 1983
- Little Creatures, originally released 1985
- True Stories, originally released 1986
- Naked, originally released 1988

The first four titles were released separately on January 10, 2006, and the second four on February 14, 2006, in digipacks rather than white jewel cases. All were mastered by Ted Jensen at Sterling Sound, NYC. In Europe, these editions were issued as two single-sided discs.
