= Storytelling Giant =

Video by Talking Heads
- Released: 1988
- Genre: New wave; post-punk; art pop; avant-funk; worldbeat; art punk
- Length: 52:00
- Label: Warner Bros.
- Producer: Alan Kleinberg

Storytelling Giant is a 1988 compilation album of music videos by American rock band Talking Heads during the 1980s. The videos are linked by real people (not actors) telling stories from their lives; the stories have no logical connection to the videos.

The film has been released on VHS and LaserDisc. A DVD version was released as part of Rhino Entertainment's box set Once in a Lifetime (2003), with three additional videos.

== Original track listing ==
All songs written by David Byrne, Jerry Harrison, Chris Frantz, and Tina Weymouth, unless otherwise indicated.

1. "Prologue" (Japanese-only laserdisc track)
2. "Once in a Lifetime" (Byrne, Brian Eno, Harrison, Frantz, Weymouth) (directed by Toni Basil and David Byrne)
3. "Wild Wild Life" (Byrne) (directed by David Byrne)
4. "Stay Up Late" (Byrne) (directed by Ted Bafaloukos)
5. "Crosseyed and Painless" (directed by Toni Basil)
6. "Burning Down the House" (directed by David Byrne)
7. "And She Was" (Byrne) (directed by Jim Blashfield)
8. "This Must Be the Place (Naive Melody)" (directed by David Byrne)
9. "The Lady Don't Mind" (directed by Jim Jarmusch)
10. "Love for Sale" (Byrne) (directed by David Byrne and Melvin Sokolsky)
11. "Road to Nowhere" (Byrne) (directed by David Byrne and Stephen R. Johnson)

== 2003 DVD version track listing ==
All songs written by David Byrne, Jerry Harrison, Chris Frantz, and Tina Weymouth, unless otherwise indicated.

1. "Once in a Lifetime" (Byrne, Brian Eno, Harrison, Frantz, Weymouth)
2. "Wild Wild Life" (Byrne)
3. "Stay Up Late" (Byrne)
4. "Blind" (previously unreleased) (directed by Rocky Morton and Annabel Jankel)
5. "Crosseyed and Painless" (Byrne, Eno, Harrison, Frantz, Weymouth)
6. "Burning Down the House"
7. "And She Was" (Byrne)
8. "Sax and Violins" (previously unreleased) (directed by Wim Wenders)
9. "This Must Be the Place (Naive Melody)"
10. "The Lady Don't Mind"
11. "Love for Sale" (Byrne)
12. "(Nothing But) Flowers" (previously unreleased) (directed by Tibor Kalman and Sandy MacLeod)
13. "Road to Nowhere" (Byrne)
