= Dolette McDonald =

American singer

Dolette McDonald is an American singer best known as a backing vocalist for Talking Heads, The Police and Sting in the 1980s.

== Early life ==
McDonald grew up in Newark, New Jersey, the youngest of seven children. She began singing in church, opening services for her mother, an evangelist.

== Career ==
Through choir director Donnie Harper, McDonald began singing backup for Cissy Houston, and later toured with Walter Murphy. Bassist Busta Jones recommended her to Talking Heads, who hired her without an audition as their first backing vocalist for the 1980 Remain in Light tour; her first show was the Heatwave festival in Bowmanville, Ontario, on 23 August 1980. She sang on "Slippery People" from Speaking in Tongues (1983) but left the band before the Stop Making Sense period.

She then joined the Police's 1983–84 Synchronicity Tour alongside Tessa Niles and Michelle Cobbs. Sting retained her for his early solo work, and she appears in his concert film Bring On the Night (1985) and in Laurie Anderson's Home of the Brave (1986). She toured with Steve Winwood (1986) and Don Henley, performed on both Amnesty International tours (1986 and 1988), and recorded with The Rolling Stones ("Winning Ugly", Dirty Work, 1986), Tears for Fears ("Year of the Knife", 1989) and David Byrne (Uh-Oh, 1992). She subsequently spent about ten years as a backing singer for Juan Gabriel.

== Later life ==
McDonald left the music industry for hospitality, working for about twelve years at hotels in Naples, Florida, before returning to singing around age 60. She has since recorded with dance producers and settled in Savannah, Georgia, where she has served on the boards of Savannah Jazz and the Savannah Repertory Theatre.
