= Thank You for Sending Me an Angel =

Song by Talking Heads

from the album More Songs About Buildings and Food
- Released: July 14, 1978
- Recorded: March–April 1978
- Studio: Compass Point, Nassau
- Genre: New wave; funk
- Length: 2:11
- Label: Sire
- Songwriter: David Byrne
- Producers: Brian Eno; Talking Heads

Official audio
- "Thank You for Sending Me an Angel" (2005 Remaster) on YouTube

"Thank You for Sending Me an Angel" is a song by the American new wave band Talking Heads. Written by vocalist David Byrne and co-produced by Brian Eno, it is the opening track on the band's second studio album, More Songs About Buildings and Food, released on July 14, 1978, by Sire Records.

== Recording ==
In 1975 Talking Heads recorded an early demo version of "Thank You for Sending Me an Angel" at CBS 30th Street Studio in New York City. The final version of the song, along with the other tracks on More Songs About Buildings and Food, were recorded at Compass Point Studios in Nassau, Bahamas, between March and April 1978.

== Critical reception ==
In a contemporary review of More Songs About Buildings and Food, Steve Simels of Stereo Review referred to the song as "really quite exciting", and called it one of his favorite songs on the album.

In 2004 British author and journalist Ian Gittins wrote the following:

Frantic and fervent, the song positively gallops towards the listener, powered by the kind of giddy-up percussive urgency that would later be used to such telling effect on "Road to Nowhere". Chris Frantz's drums sear scorch marks around the studio, and are even more effective in conjunction with some distinctly panic-stricken keyboards and Byrne's feral-sounding startled howls. [...] The shortest song on the album, "Thank You for Sending Me an Angel" abruptly stops dead at 2' 11" but still functions as an erudite statement of intent.

In 2022 writer Mike Segretto listed "Thank You for Sending Me an Angel" as being among Byrne's "greatest songs".

== Live performances ==
Talking Heads performed "Thank You for Sending Me an Angel" during their 1983–1984 concert tour in support of their 1983 album Speaking in Tongues. A performance of the song at Hollywood's Pantages Theatre in December 1983 is featured in the Jonathan Demme-directed concert film Stop Making Sense (1984), as well as the 1999 re-release of the live album of the same name.

== Personnel ==
- David Byrne – lead vocals, guitar, synthesized percussion
- Chris Frantz – drums, percussion
- Jerry Harrison – piano, organ, synthesizer, guitar, backing vocals
- Tina Weymouth – bass guitar
