= Cities (song) =

- Artwork for UK single

Single by Talking Heads

from the album Fear of Music
- B-side: "Cities" (live version); "Artists Only"
- Released: July 8, 1980
- Genre: New wave; post-punk; funk
- Length: 4:10
- Label: Sire
- Songwriter: David Byrne
- Producers: Brian Eno; Talking Heads

Talking Heads singles chronology
"I Zimbra" (1980)	"Cities" (1980)	"Crosseyed and Painless" (1980)

Official audio
- "Cities" on YouTube

"Cities" is a single, released in 1980, by the American rock band Talking Heads. It is the fourth track on their third studio album Fear of Music (1979).

When the 1984 concert film Stop Making Sense was first released on home video, the songs "Cities", together with "Big Business"/"I Zimbra" were restored to the performance, thus forming what was dubbed the "special edition" of the film. For the 1999 re-release, these songs were no longer included in sequence with the rest of the footage. It and subsequent video and DVD releases have placed these songs after the film in an unrestored full-frame version.

== Song style ==
"Cities" is a fast-paced bass and keyboard-led song. Tina Weymouth's bass playing in the song is described by AllMusic as both "melodic" and "funky", while David Byrne's guitar is said to be jittery, but clean-sounding. The song fades both in and out with a very aggressive funky rhythm and the fade-out serves as a build-up to the next song on the album, "Life During Wartime".

== Lyrics ==
The song is mainly about a man looking for a city to live in. Deadpan humor can be seen in lyrics such as "Did I forget to mention, forget to mention Memphis, home of Elvis and the ancient Greeks." – which is historically incorrect since Memphis was a city in ancient Egypt, not Greece.

== Personnel ==
Talking Heads

- David Byrne – lead vocals, guitar
- Jerry Harrison – guitar, backing vocals, keyboards
- Tina Weymouth – bass guitar, backing vocals
- Chris Frantz – drums

Additional musician

- Brian Eno – electronic treatments, piano, guitar, backing vocals

== Other versions ==
The rock band Phish covered "Cities" on their second official live album Slip Stitch and Pass (1997) and it has been played frequently at their concerts.

== Track listing ==
7" release

1. "Cities" – 4:10
2. "Cities" – (live version)

12" release

1. "Cities" – 4:10
2. "Cities" – (live version)
3. "Artists Only" – 3:36
