= Stop Making Sense =

1984 concert film by Jonathan Demme

- Theatrical release poster
- Directed by: Jonathan Demme
- Produced by: Gary Goetzman
- Starring: Talking Heads
- Cinematography: Jordan Cronenweth
- Edited by: Lisa Day
- Production companies: Talking Heads Films; Arnold Stiefel Company
- Distributed by: Cinecom International Films; Island Alive Releasing
- Release dates: April 24, 1984 (SFIFF); October 19, 1984 (United States)
- Running time: 88 minutes
- Country: United States
- Language: English
- Budget: $1.2 million
- Box office: $14.4 million

Stop Making Sense is a 1984 American concert film featuring a live performance by the American rock band Talking Heads. The film was directed by Jonathan Demme, produced by Gary Goetzman, and executive produced by Gary Kurfirst, the band’s longtime manager. The film was shot over four nights in December 1983 at Hollywood's Pantages Theatre while Talking Heads were on tour promoting their fifth studio album, Speaking in Tongues (1983). Stop Making Sense includes performances of the early Talking Heads single "Psycho Killer" (1977), through to their most recent hit at the time, "Burning Down the House" (1983). It also includes songs from the solo career of frontman David Byrne and by Tom Tom Club, the side project of drummer Chris Frantz and bassist Tina Weymouth.

The film was independently produced, and the band raised the budget of $1.2 million themselves. The four core members of Talking Heads are joined by backing singers Lynn Mabry and Ednah Holt, guitarist Alex Weir, keyboardist Bernie Worrell and percussionist Steve Scales. Stop Making Sense is considered by critics to be a classic and the greatest concert film of all time. The film is a pioneering example of the use of early digital audio techniques. In 2021, it was selected for preservation in the United States National Film Registry by the Library of Congress as being "culturally, historically, or aesthetically significant". A special 4K restoration of the film was re-released in theaters in September 2023 by A24.

== Synopsis ==
Lead singer David Byrne walks on to a bare stage with a portable cassette tape player and an acoustic guitar. He introduces "Psycho Killer" by saying he wants to play a tape, but in reality a Roland TR-808 drum machine starts playing from the mixing board.

With each successive song, Byrne is joined by more members of the band: first by Tina Weymouth for "Heaven" (with Lynn Mabry providing harmony vocals from backstage), second by Chris Frantz for "Thank You for Sending Me an Angel", and third by Jerry Harrison for "Found a Job". Performance equipment is wheeled out and added to the set to accommodate the additional musicians: back-up singers Lynn Mabry and Ednah Holt, keyboardist Bernie Worrell, percussionist Steve Scales, and guitarist Alex Weir. The first song to feature the entire lineup is "Burning Down the House", although the original 1985 RCA/Columbia Home Video release (which featured three additional songs in two performances edited into the film) has the entire band (minus Worrell) performing "Cities" before this song. The band also performs two songs from Byrne's soundtrack album The Catherine Wheel, "What a Day That Was" and (as a bonus song on the home video release) "Big Business".

Byrne leaves the stage at one point for a costume change, during which the Weymouth–Frantz-led side-band Tom Tom Club perform their song "Genius of Love". The Tom Tom Club performance allows Byrne to don his "big suit", an absurdly large business suit that he wears for the song "Girlfriend Is Better".

In a departure from most concert films, the audience is mostly unseen during the concert. During the final song, "Crosseyed and Painless," the viewer sees shots of the audience for the first time.

== Setlist ==
=== DVD and Blu-ray ===
All tracks are written by David Byrne, Chris Frantz, Jerry Harrison, Tina Weymouth, except where noted.

No.	Title	Writer(s)	Length
1.	"Psycho Killer"	Byrne, Frantz, Weymouth
2.	"Heaven"	Byrne, Harrison
3.	"Thank You for Sending Me an Angel"	Byrne
4.	"Found a Job"	Byrne
5.	"Slippery People"
6.	"Burning Down the House"
7.	"Life During Wartime"
8.	"Making Flippy Floppy"
9.	"Swamp"
10.	"What a Day That Was"	Byrne
11.	"This Must Be the Place (Naive Melody)"
12.	"Once in a Lifetime"	Byrne, Brian Eno, Frantz, Harrison, Weymouth
13.	"Genius of Love"	Weymouth, Frantz, Adrian Belew, Steven Stanley (as Tom Tom Club)
14.	"Girlfriend Is Better"
15.	"Take Me to the River"	Al Green, Mabon "Teenie" Hodges
16.	"Crosseyed and Painless"	Byrne, Eno, Frantz, Harrison, Weymouth

=== VHS and LaserDisc ===
All tracks are written by David Byrne, Chris Frantz, Jerry Harrison, Tina Weymouth, except where noted.

No.	Title	Writer(s)	Note	Length
1.	"Psycho Killer"	Byrne, Frantz, Weymouth
2.	"Heaven"	Byrne, Harrison
3.	"Thank You for Sending Me an Angel"	Byrne
4.	"Found a Job"	Byrne
5.	"Slippery People"
6.	"Cities"	Byrne	*
7.	"Burning Down the House"
8.	"Life During Wartime"
9.	"Making Flippy Floppy"
10.	"Swamp"
11.	"What a Day That Was"	Byrne
12.	"This Must Be the Place (Naive Melody)"
13.	"Once in a Lifetime"	Byrne, Brian Eno, Frantz, Harrison, Weymouth
14.	"Big Business"	Byrne, John Chernoff	*
15.	"I Zimbra"	Byrne, Eno, Hugo Ball	*
16.	"Genius of Love"	Weymouth, Frantz, Adrian Belew, Steven Stanley (as Tom Tom Club)
17.	"Girlfriend Is Better"
18.	"Take Me to the River"	Al Green, Mabon "Teenie" Hodges
19.	"Crosseyed and Painless"	Byrne, Eno, Frantz, Harrison, Weymouth

*Songs available as extra features on DVD/Blu-ray releases, but not part of the main feature.

== Personnel ==
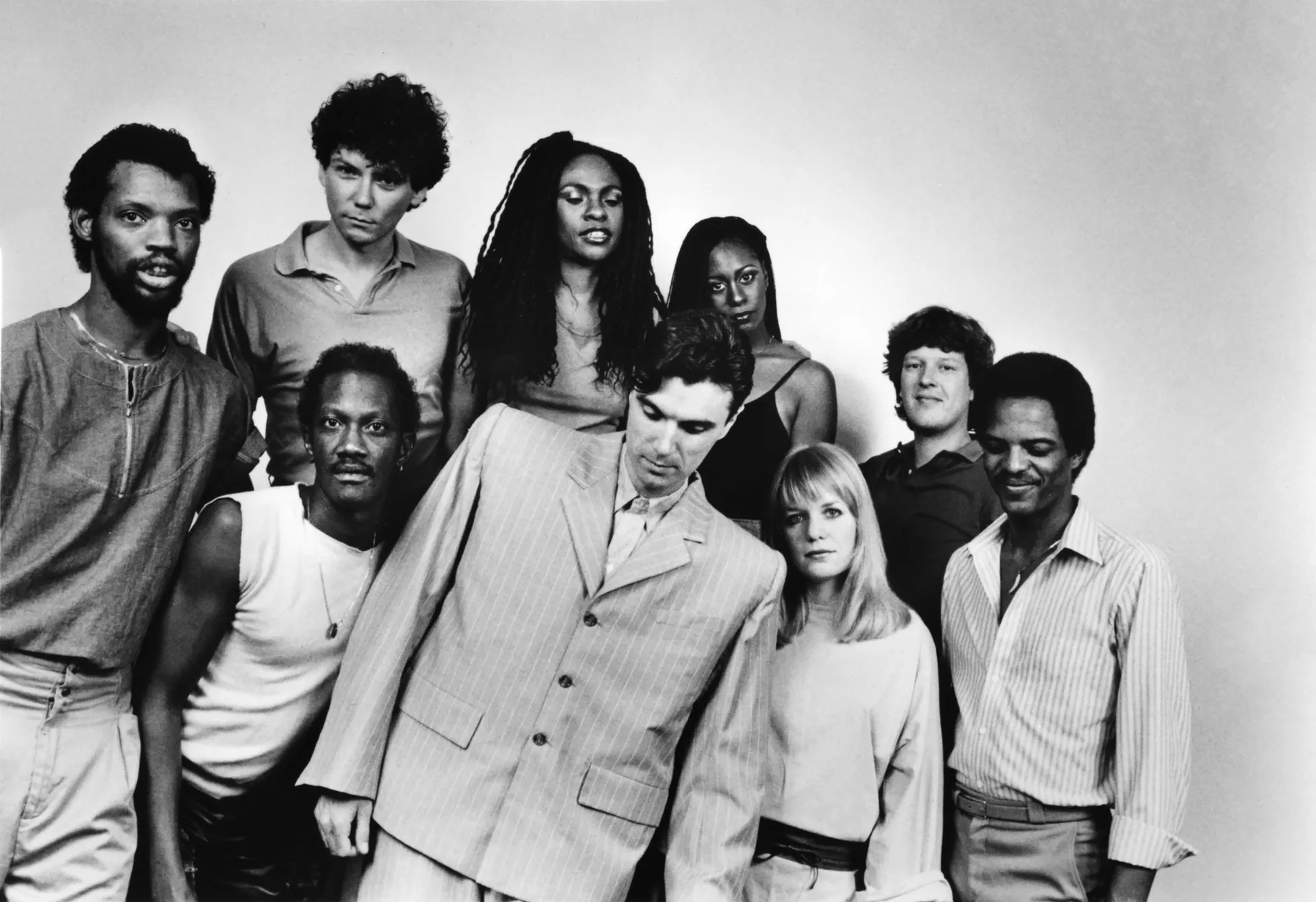
A promotional photo of the lineup for Stop Making Sense

The following are in order of appearance.

- David Byrne – lead vocals, guitar
- Tina Weymouth – bass, keyboard bass, guitar, lead vocals for "Genius of Love"
- Chris Frantz – drums, vocals for "Genius of Love" and "Burning Down the House"
- Jerry Harrison – guitar, keyboards, backing vocals
- Steve Scales – percussion, backing vocals
- Lynn Mabry – backing vocals
- Ednah Holt – backing vocals
- Alex Weir – guitar, backing vocals
- Bernie Worrell – keyboards

== Production ==
The filming of Stop Making Sense spanned four live shows at the Pantages Theatre in Los Angeles between December 13 and 16, 1983. Initially, three nights were booked but a fourth night, December 16, was added for additional filming. Although the film was originally recorded using analog techniques, it was later transferred and then digitally edited and mixed using a Sony PCM-3324 24-track digital recorder. Demme has stated that one night of shooting was dedicated almost entirely to wide shots from a distance, to minimize the intrusion of cameras on stage. Demme had considered additional shooting on a soundstage made to recreate the Pantages Theatre, but the band declined to do this, as they thought the lack of audience response would have hindered the energy of their performance. Before the shooting of the movie, Byrne implored the band to wear neutral-coloured clothing so the stage lights would not illuminate anything too distinctive. However, Frantz's laundry had not come back in time for the first show at the Pantages, and so he wore a turquoise-colored polo shirt for all three nights for continuity.

Demme also considered including more shots of the audience reacting to the performance, as is traditional in concert films. However, he discovered that filming the audience required additional lighting, which inhibited the audience's energy. This in turn made the band feel insecure and thus led to "the worst Talking Heads performance in the history of the band's career". The only direct audience shots in the film occur at the very end, during "Crosseyed and Painless".

The big suit that Byrne wears during "Girlfriend is Better" was partly inspired by Noh theatre styles and became an icon not only of the film – as it appears on the movie poster, for instance – but of Byrne himself. Byrne said: "I was in Japan in between tours and I was checking out traditional Japanese theater – Kabuki, Noh, Bunraku – and I was wondering what to wear on our upcoming tour. A fashion designer friend (Jurgen Lehl) said in his typically droll manner, 'Well, David, everything is bigger on stage.' He was referring to gestures and all that, but I applied the idea to a businessman's suit." Pauline Kael stated in her review: "When he comes on wearing a boxlike 'big suit' – his body lost inside this form that sticks out around him like the costumes in Noh plays, or like Beuys' large suit of felt that hangs off a wall – it's a perfect psychological fit." On the DVD he gives his reasoning behind the suit: "I wanted my head to appear smaller and the easiest way to do that was to make my body bigger, because music is very physical and often the body understands it before the head."

The film was conceived with the intention of only filming the concert, with no plans for cutaways to interviews with the band members, or the use of split-screen. The band reflected this was a wise choice in hindsight: the mockumentary This Is Spinal Tap was released in the same year, with Weymouth remarking the film would have inevitably been compared to Spinal Tap had they taken that approach.

The film's title was derived from a lyric in the song "Girlfriend Is Better".

== Release ==
Stop Making Sense premiered on April 24, 1984 as the closing night film of the San Francisco International Film Festival. Three months later, Filmex screened the film on its closing night. The film entered commercial release in the United States on October 19, 1984.

When the film was first released on home video, the songs "Cities" and "Big Business"/"I Zimbra" were restored to the performance, thus forming what was dubbed the "special edition" of the film. For the 1999 re-release, these songs were no longer included in sequence with the rest of the footage. It and subsequent video and DVD releases have placed these songs after the film in an unrestored full-frame version.

The film has been released on Blu-ray, widescreen DVD, VHS in both fullscreen and widescreen versions, and LaserDisc (in Japan).

=== 2023 re-release ===
Poster for the 4K re-release of Stop Making Sense.

As part of the deal with the film's original distributor, Cinecom, the ownership of the rights to Stop Making Sense reverted to Byrne, Weymouth, Frantz, and Harrison shortly before the 40th anniversary of its original release. Hoping to commemorate the occasion, the group sought out potential companies to partner with on a re-release, eventually settling on A24. A24 announced they had obtained the distribution rights in March 2023, making Stop Making Sense their second acquisition for re-release following Pi (1998), and revealed plans to release a 4K restoration in theaters the following September.

The studio sought out as much of the original materials as possible for the restoration, but learned after announcing the release that the original negative for the film was missing: prior distributors simply scanned preexisting screening prints of the film, including for the previous 1999 re-release. After an extensive search, the original negative for the film was found in an MGM film vault, despite MGM not having been involved in the making of the film. Similarly, Eric Thorngren and Talking Heads member Jerry Harrison planned to create new Dolby Atmos sound mixes, initially using materials from the previous distributor and Rhino Records. However, they ran into difficulty when they discovered they did not have the original audience tracks: the original audio was stored in the library of Todd-AO, which had since gone out of business and its building demolished. Eventually, it was discovered that Todd-AO's collection had been claimed by Sony, who transported it to a warehouse in Kansas, where the original audio tracks were found in time to be included in the restoration. Using these original tracks, as well as the post-production overdubs originally overseen by Demme to fix mistakes in the film's recording, Thorngren and Harrison painstakingly remastered the film's sound.

The studio premiered the new restoration on September 11, 2023, in 4K on IMAX at the 2023 Toronto International Film Festival, followed by a Q&A hosted by Spike Lee with Byrne, Weymouth, Frantz and Harrison in attendance, reuniting the group for the first time since their induction into the Rock and Roll Hall of Fame in 2002. A24 also released a 4K Collector's Edition in May 2024. The home video release includes an extended cut overseen by the band that includes the performances of the "Cities" and "Big Business / I Zimbra" performances: the original negatives had been lost, but new edits were compiled using the restored footage from the cameras, including unseen footage. Jonathan Demme's own extended cut featuring the missing songs, originally released on VHS and LaserDisc, is also included.

The film entered first as an exclusive IMAX exhibition on September 22, 2023, before heading to conventional theaters on September 29, 2023, globally. Rhino Entertainment also released a new remaster of the film's soundtrack, which includes the complete concert for the first time, on vinyl and digitally on August 18, 2023.

== Reception ==
On review aggregator Rotten Tomatoes, Stop Making Sense holds an approval rating of 100% based on 71 reviews, with an average rating of 9.4/10. The website's critical consensus reads: "Jonathan Demme's Stop Making Sense captures the energetic, unpredictable live act of peak Talking Heads with colour and visual wit." Metacritic, which uses a weighted average, assigned the film a score of 94 out of 100, based on 15 critics, indicating "universal acclaim". It won the National Society of Film Critics Award for Best Non-Fiction Film in 1984.

The film is widely regarded as the greatest concert film ever made. Leonard Maltin gave it four out of four, describing it as "brilliantly conceived, shot, edited and performed" and "one of the greatest rock movies ever made". Roger Ebert gave the film a three-and-a-half star rating, writing that "the overwelming [sic] impression throughout Stop Making Sense is of enormous energy, of life being lived at a joyous high ... It's a live show with elements of Metropolis ... But the film's peak moments come through Byrne's simple physical presence. He jogs in place with his sidemen; he runs around the stage; he seems so happy to be alive and making music ... He serves as a reminder of how sour and weary and strung-out many rock bands have become."

Danny Peary described Stop Making Sense as "Riveting ... What takes place on stage will make even the most sceptical into Talking Heads converts ... [The] performances are invariably exciting, Byrne's lyrics are intriguing. Byrne, his head moving rhythmically as if he had just had shock treatments, is spellbinding – what a talent! ... Byrne is known for his belief that music should be performed in an interesting, visual manner, and this should make him proud." Robert Christgau noted the "sinuous, almost elegant clarity" of Demme's direction, while writing that the film had pushed the "limits to how great a rock concert movie can be ... as far as they were liable to go". Christgau described it as "the finest concert film" while Pauline Kael of The New Yorker described it as "close to perfection".

In 1985, the film received the Grand Prix for Best Film at Film Fest Gent.

== Legacy ==
Stop Making Sense is often regarded by critics and audiences as the greatest concert film of all time.

The movie version of "Once in a Lifetime" appeared over the opening credits of the 1986 comedy film Down and Out in Beverly Hills.

Stop Making Sense was parodied in an episode of the comedy series Documentary Now!. In the second-season episode "Final Transmission", the show sees the new wave band Test Pattern play its final concert. It includes references to the staging and music styles of the Talking Heads, with the band's lead singer (played by Fred Armisen) parodying Byrne. Gizmodo screened the episode to Frantz and Weymouth in a video released online. They both expressed amusement and shock at the level of detail gone into parodying the film.

The image of Byrne's big suit has been parodied on multiple occasions, including a spoof by Rich Hall impersonating Byrne and his big suit on an episode of Saturday Night Live. Byrne himself made light of his massive suit during an appearance on The Late Show with Stephen Colbert, where he appeared in a fake ad for "David Byrne's Giant Suit Emporium" promoting his new clothing store while insisting he did not sell giant suits like the one he wore in Stop Making Sense. Byrne makes an appearance in the children's musical comedy special John Mulaney & the Sack Lunch Bunch performing an original song alongside child performer Lexi Perkel. At one point, Byrne and Perkel wear matching pink suits, Perkel's being several sizes too large for her, in reference to Stop Making Sense.

Stop Making Sense is regularly screened as a cult film in revival houses throughout the world. The Astor Theatre in Melbourne, Australia has made a tradition of playing it as part of a "Stop Making Sense Dance Party" every January since 2016. Dancing and audience participation is encouraged, with many turning up in costume and bringing props.

In 2021, Stop Making Sense was selected for preservation in the United States National Film Registry by the Library of Congress as "culturally, historically, or aesthetically significant".

In January 2024, A24 Music announced a tribute album called Everyone's Getting Involved: A Tribute to Talking Heads' Stop Making Sense, which was released on May 17. The album features 16 bands and artists, including the National, Paramore, Lorde, and Miley Cyrus, covering the Stop Making Sense setlist in order.

== See also ==
- The Last Waltz (1978) – a Martin Scorsese–directed concert film featuring the Band
- New wave music
- Worldbeat

== Bibliography ==
- Dare, Michael (November 9, 1984). "Start Making Sense: An Interview with Jonathan Demme". LA Weekly. Archived from the original on July 24, 2009.
- Grow, Kory (August 1, 2014). "Talking Heads on 'Stop Making Sense': 'We Didn't Want Any Bulls—t'". Rolling Stone.
- Siegel, Alan (September 27, 2023). "Nothing Is Better Than This: The Oral History of 'Stop Making Sense'". The Ringer.
- Steenstra, Sytze (2010). Song and Circumstance: The Work of David Byrne from Talking Heads to the Present. Continuum. ISBN 978-0-8264-4168-3.
