= Love → Building on Fire =

1977 single by Talking Heads

Single by Talking Heads
- B-side: "New Feeling"
- Released: February 1977
- Recorded: 1977
- Studio: Sundragon (New York City)
- Genre: New wave
- Length: 2:57
- Label: Sire
- Songwriter: David Byrne
- Producers: Tony Bongiovi; Tom Erdelyi

Talking Heads singles chronology
"Love → Building on Fire" (1977)	"Uh-Oh, Love Comes to Town" (1977)

Audio video
- "Love → Building on Fire" on YouTube

"Love → Building on Fire" (read as "Love Goes to Building on Fire") is a song by American rock band Talking Heads, released as a single in 1977. The single preceded the band's debut album by seven months, and was recorded before keyboardist and guitarist Jerry Harrison joined the band. As the single was the first piece of music released commercially by the band, its release was cited as a milestone in the band's history in its Rock and Roll Hall of Fame entry.

The song did not appear on any of the band's original studio albums, though it was later included on their 1992 compilation album Sand in the Vaseline: Popular Favorites, on their 2003 box set Once in a Lifetime, and as a bonus track on a reissue of Talking Heads: 77. A live recording of the song is featured on their live album The Name of This Band Is Talking Heads. Two early demos (1976 Demo, CBS/Columbia Demo) and a live version (Live at Max's Kansas City, New York, NY, 10/9/76) of the song appear on their Tentative Decisions: Demos & Live compilation of rare material from the band's early years. It also appears on the compilation The Name of This Band Member is Chris, one of a series of four compilations released in October 2026, each compiled by a different band member.

== Track listing ==
No.	Title	Length
1.	"Love → Building on Fire"	2:57
2.	"New Feeling"	3:09

== Personnel ==
Adapted from Talking Heads: 77 liner notes.

- David Byrne – guitar, lead vocals, bells
- Chris Frantz – drums, tambourine, steel pan
- Tina Weymouth – bass guitar

The original recorded version was produced by Tony Bongiovi and mastered by Ted Jensen. The horns in the song were arranged by Brad Baker and Lance Quinn.

== Artistic impressions of the song ==
Jerry Harrison called "Love → Building on Fire" one of his favorite songs to play live, despite the fact the song was recorded before he joined the band. Harrison stated that he and Byrne "used to get a wonderful interplay of guitars that was a bit like early Television". However, he felt that the best live performances were never recorded.
