= Psycho Killer =

1977 single by the Talking Heads

- U.S. vinyl edition cover

Single by Talking Heads

from the album Talking Heads: 77
- Language: English; French
- B-side: "Psycho Killer" (acoustic version); "I Wish You Wouldn't Say That"
- Released: November 25, 1977
- Recorded: 1977
- Genre: New wave; art punk; art pop; art rock
- Length: 4:19
- Label: Sire
- Songwriters: David Byrne; Chris Frantz; Tina Weymouth
- Producers: Tony Bongiovi; Lance Quinn; Talking Heads

Talking Heads singles chronology
"Uh-Oh, Love Comes to Town" (1977)	"Psycho Killer" (1977)	"Pulled Up" (1978)

Music video
- "Psycho Killer" on YouTube

"Psycho Killer" is a song by the American rock band Talking Heads, released on their debut album Talking Heads: 77. The track was later released as a single on November 25, 1977.

The band's "signature debut hit" features lyrics that seem to represent the thoughts of a serial killer.

"Psycho Killer" was the only song from the album to appear on the Billboard Hot 100 chart, peaking at number 92. It reached number 32 on the Triple J Hottest 100 in 1989, and peaked at number 11 on the Dutch singles chart in 1977. The song is included in The Rock and Roll Hall of Fame's 500 Songs that Shaped Rock and Roll.

== Composition and early versions ==
Originally written and performed as a ballad, "Psycho Killer" became what AllMusic calls a "deceptively funky new wave/no wave song" with "an insistent rhythm, and one of the most memorable, driving basslines in rock & roll." Consequence ranked it 11th in its top 50 list of the best punk songs, categorizing it as "art-punk", a conclusion shared by Slate. Times called it an art pop masterpiece and Billboard an "art-rock anthem".

"Psycho Killer" was first performed by the Artistics, the band formed by David Byrne and Chris Frantz while they were studying at the Rhode Island School of Design, in 1974. An early version of the song by the Artistics appeared on a three-song demo tape recorded in Providence, Rhode Island, in early 1974. The demo tape was rediscovered in the archives of the Rhode Island School of Design Museum in 2025. This version of "Psycho Killer" from the demo tape was selected for inclusion on the Talking Heads compilation Tentative Decisions: Demos & Live, released in late November 2025.

Prototype versions of "Psycho Killer" were performed onstage by Talking Heads as early as December 1975.

== Lyrics ==
When it was finally completed and released as a single in December 1977, "Psycho Killer" became instantly associated in popular culture with the contemporaneous Son of Sam serial killings (July 1976 – July 1977). Although the band always insisted that the song had no inspiration from the notorious events, the single's release date was "eerily timely" and marked by a "macabre synchronicity".

According to the preliminary lyric sheets copied onto the 2006 remaster of Talking Heads: 77, the song started off as a semi-narrative of the killer actually committing murders. In the liner notes of Once in a Lifetime: The Best of Talking Heads, David Byrne says:

When I started writing this (I got help later), I imagined Alice Cooper doing a Randy Newman–type ballad. Both the Joker and Hannibal Lecter were much more fascinating than the good guys. Everybody sort of roots for the bad guys in movies.

The bridge lyrics are in French, as is the prominent chorus line "Qu'est-ce que c'est?" ("What is this/it?"). The bridge lyrics are:

Lyrics in French

Ce que j'ai fait, ce soir-là
Ce qu'elle a dit, ce soir-là
Réalisant mon espoir
Je me lance vers la gloire... OK !

Translation

What I did, that night
What she said, that night
Fulfilling my hope
I launch myself towards glory... OK!

The French lyrics were supplied by Tina Weymouth. According to Chris Frantz, "I told David that Tina's mother is French and that they always spoke French in the home. Tina agreed to do it and just sat down and did it in a little over an hour. I wrote a couple of more verses, and within a few hours, 'Psycho Killer' was more or less done."

== Later releases ==
Talking Heads performed the song on the BBC2 television show The Old Grey Whistle Test on January 31, 1978. The performance was later released on a DVD compilation of performances from the show.

A live version recorded in 1977 for radio broadcast was released on The Name of This Band Is Talking Heads in 1982, featuring an additional verse not heard in the studio version, and the later CD release included a second, later live version from the Remain in Light tour. In 1984, another live version was included on the soundtrack for the band's concert movie Stop Making Sense. The film opens with Byrne alone onstage, announcing "'Hi. I've got a tape I want to play'...[and] strumming maniacally like Richie Havens", playing an acoustic version of "Psycho Killer", backed only by a Roland TR-808 drum machine whose sound appears to be issuing from a boombox.

The band also recorded an acoustic version of the song featuring Arthur Russell on cello. In the liner notes for Once in a Lifetime: The Best of Talking Heads (1992), Jerry Harrison wrote of the B-side of the single, "I'm glad we persuaded Tony [Bongiovi] and Lance [Quinn] that the version with the cellos shouldn't be the only one."

The song also appears on their 1992 compilation album Popular Favorites 1976–1992: Sand in the Vaseline and on another compilation album, The Best of Talking Heads, in 2004.

== Music video ==
The song's official video was released on June 5, 2025, in commemoration of the 50th anniversary of the band's first concert at CBGB. It involves a woman undergoing a mental breakdown over several days from the weight of her routine, with scenes alternating between her home, her workplace, her car, and the woods.

The video stars Irish actress Saoirse Ronan and was directed by American filmmaker Mike Mills, who are both longtime fans of the band. Mills pitched his idea to the four former members of Talking Heads over Zoom, and his was eventually selected over several other filmmakers. Ronan was cast by Mills after the two had coincidentally befriended each other around the time of the music video's development. Of the video, Talking Heads commented the following:

"This video makes the song better – we love what this video is not – it's not literal, creepy, bloody, physically violent or obvious."

== Legacy ==
The song has been recorded in cover versions by many bands and musicians including Velvet Revolver, James Hall, the Bobs (a cappella group), Victoria Vox, Wet Leg, Duran Duran featuring Victoria De Angelis, Miley Cyrus, Harry Styles, and the Ukulele Orchestra of Great Britain at the 2009 BBC Proms.

According to an NME interview, American singer, rapper and producer will.i.am stated that "Psycho Killer" partially inspired the songwriting for his band the Black Eyed Peas' 2009 single "I Gotta Feeling", in alternating lines between English and French.

Massachusetts-based band the Fools parodied the song and entitled it "Psycho Chicken"; it was included as a bonus record with their major-label debut album Sold Out in 1980. Ice-T says that "Psycho Killer" was a starting influence for his band Body Count's controversial song "Cop Killer". Singer Selena Gomez samples the bassline on her 2017 single "Bad Liar." A Talking Heads tribute band based in Baltimore, active since 2011, call themselves the Psycho Killers.

In 2023, Loudwire reported that the song's lyrics were the most-searched in the punk rock genre from January 2019 through July 2023, according to an independent study of search engine data pulled from Google Trends.

== Personnel ==
Talking Heads

- David Byrne – guitar, lead vocals
- Chris Frantz – drums
- Jerry Harrison – guitar, keyboards, backing vocals
- Tina Weymouth – bass guitar

Additional personnel

- Arthur Russell – cello (acoustic version)

== Charts ==
Chart (1978)	Peak position
Belgium (Ultratop 50 Flanders)	19
Netherlands (Dutch Top 40)	11
Netherlands (Single Top 100)	13
US Billboard Hot 100	92

Chart (2009)	Peak position
Belgium (Back Catalogue Singles Flanders)	24

Chart (2025)	Peak position
US Hot Rock & Alternative Songs (Billboard)	12

Chart (2026)	Peak position
Canada Hot 100 (Billboard)	50

== Certifications ==
Region	Certification	Certified units/sales
Italy (FIMI) sales since 2009	Platinum	100,000^{‡}
New Zealand (RMNZ)	3× Platinum	90,000^{‡}
Spain (Promusicae) (since 2015)	Gold	30,000^{‡}
United Kingdom (BPI) sales since 2011	Platinum	600,000^{‡}
United States (RIAA)	2× Platinum	2,000,000^{‡}
^{‡} Sales+streaming figures based on certification alone.
