= Houses in Motion =

Single by Talking Heads

from the album Remain in Light
- B-side: "Air"
- Released: May 1981
- Recorded: July–August 1980
- Studio: Compass Point (Nassau, Bahamas); Sigma Sound (New York City)
- Genre: New wave; post-punk
- Length: 4:33
- Label: Sire
- Composers: David Byrne; Brian Eno; Chris Frantz; Jerry Harrison; Tina Weymouth
- Lyricist: David Byrne
- Producers: Brian Eno; Talking Heads

Talking Heads singles chronology
"Once in a Lifetime" (1981)	"Houses in Motion" (1981)	"Life During Wartime" (live) (1982)

Official audio
- "Houses in Motion" on YouTube

"Houses in Motion" is the second and final single from Remain in Light (1980), the fourth studio album by the American rock band Talking Heads. An alternate mix of the song was released in vinyl form in May 1981 and peaked at No. 50 on the UK singles chart.

== Recording and style ==
The song features a brass lead played by avant-garde trumpeter Jon Hassell. Talking Heads' lead vocalist and chief lyricist David Byrne remixed the song with Remain in Light producer Brian Eno at Compass Point Studios in the Bahamas in the summer of 1980. The B-side "Air" is from the band's third studio album Fear of Music (1979). The cover artwork is by designer Thomi Wroblewski.

== Track listing ==
1. "Houses in Motion" – 4:33
2. "Air" – 3:34
- The 12" version included an extra live version of "Houses of Motion".

== Charts ==
Chart (1981)	Peak position
Irish Singles Chart	26
UK singles chart	50

== Live performance ==
Talking Heads regularly performed the song live from August 1980 to December 1983. A recording from November 1980 at the Emerald City club in Cherry Hill, New Jersey was included on their double live album, The Name of This Band Is Talking Heads (1982).

Byrne also performed the song throughout his 2008–2009 Songs of David Byrne and Brian Eno Tour, with a performance featuring in the documentary film Ride, Rise, Roar (2010).

== Cover versions ==
British post-punk band A Certain Ratio recorded a cover of the song in 1980 at Strawberry Studios. It was intended to feature vocals from Grace Jones, who attended the recording session, but these were not completed. The track was eventually released with its scratch vocal by the band's Jez Kerr intact on the 2019 box set acr:box.
