= I Zimbra =

1980 single by Talking Heads

- UK vinyl single

Single by Talking Heads

from the album Fear of Music
- B-side: "Air" (3:33)
- Released: February 7, 1980
- Recorded: 1979
- Genre: New wave; post-punk; Afrobeat; disco
- Length: 3:06
- Label: Sire
- Songwriters: David Byrne; Brian Eno; Hugo Ball
- Producer: Brian Eno

Talking Heads singles chronology
"Life During Wartime" (1979)	"I Zimbra" (1980)	"Cities" (1980)

Official audio
- "I Zimbra" on YouTube

"I Zimbra" is a song by the American rock band Talking Heads, released on February 7, 1980, by Sire Records as the second single from their third studio album Fear of Music (1979).

According to Sytze Steenstra in Song and Circumstance: The Work of David Byrne from Talking Heads to the Present (2010), the music draws heavily on the African popular music that David Byrne was listening to at the time.

== Background ==
The lyrics of "I Zimbra" are an adaptation of German Dadaist Hugo Ball's poem Gadji beri bimba.

The song was one of three songs (along with "Cities" and "Big Business") that were cut from the theatrical release of the 1984 concert film Stop Making Sense but were restored as a bonus feature for the 1999 DVD release.

== Influence ==
In an interview, Jerry Harrison named "I Zimbra" as his favorite Talking Heads song, and pointed out that the style of the band's next studio album, Remain in Light (1980), was indebted to the song's production style.

We also knew that our next album would be a further exploration of what we had begun with 'I Zimbra'.

— Jerry Harrison, Liquid Audio, 1997

The song is used in the opening scene of the superhero film Spider-Man: No Way Home (2021). It is also in Byrne's stage musical American Utopia (2020), also filmed for theatrical release by Spike Lee.

== Personnel ==
Talking Heads

- David Byrne – guitars, lead vocals
- Jerry Harrison – keyboards, backing vocals, guitars
- Tina Weymouth – bass guitar, backing vocals
- Chris Frantz – drums

Additional musicians

- Brian Eno – electronic treatments, backing vocals
- Robert Fripp – guitar
- Gene Wilder – congas
- Ari – congas
- Hassam Ramzy – surdo
- Abdou M'Boup – djembe, talking drum
- Assane Thiam – percussion
- Julie Last – backing vocals

== Charts ==
Sales chart peaks for "I Zimbra"
Chart (1980)	Peak position
U.S. Billboard Disco Top 100	28
