= Remain in Light =

Studio album by Talking Heads
- Released: October 8, 1980
- Recorded: July–August 1980
- Studios: Compass Point (Nassau, Bahamas); Sigma Sound (New York City)
- Genres: New wave; post-punk; funk rock; art rock; Afrofunk; dance-rock; worldbeat; art-pop; psychedelic funk
- Length: 39:50
- Label: Sire
- Producer: Brian Eno

Talking Heads chronology
Fear of Music (1979)	Remain in Light (1980)	The Name of This Band Is Talking Heads (1982)

Singles from Remain in Light
- 1. "The Great Curve" Released: 1980 (France); 2. "Once in a Lifetime" Released: January 1981; 3. "Houses in Motion" Released: May 1981; 4. "Born Under Punches (The Heat Goes On)" Released: August 1981 (Japan); 5. "Crosseyed and Painless" Released: November 1981 (Germany)

Back cover
- Artwork originally created as front cover

Remain in Light is the fourth studio album by the American rock band Talking Heads, released on October 8, 1980, by Sire Records. The band's third and final album to be produced by Brian Eno, Remain in Light was recorded at Compass Point Studios in the Bahamas and Sigma Sound Studios in New York in July and August 1980.

After the release of Fear of Music in 1979, Talking Heads and Eno sought to dispel notions of the band as a mere vehicle for frontman and songwriter David Byrne. Drawing influence from Nigerian Afrobeat musician Fela Kuti, they blended African polyrhythms and funk with electronics, recording instrumental tracks as a series of looping grooves. Session musicians included the guitarist Adrian Belew, the singer Nona Hendryx, and the trumpeter Jon Hassell.

Byrne struggled with writer's block, but adopted a scattered, stream of consciousness lyrical style inspired by early rap and academic literature on Africa. The album artwork was conceived by bassist, Tina Weymouth, and drummer, Chris Frantz, with the help of the Massachusetts Institute of Technology's computers and design company, M & Co. The band hired additional members for a promotional tour, after which they went on a year-long hiatus to pursue side projects.

Remain in Light attained acclaim for its sonic experimentation, rhythmic innovations, and merging of disparate genres into a cohesive whole. The album reached No. 19 on the U.S. Billboard 200 album chart and No. 21 on the UK Albums Chart, and produced the singles "Once in a Lifetime" and "Houses in Motion". It has been featured in several publications' lists of the best albums of the 1980s and of all time. In 2017, the Library of Congress deemed the album "culturally, historically, or aesthetically significant" and selected it for preservation in the National Recording Registry.

== Background ==
Talking Heads recorded their second and third albums, More Songs About Buildings and Food (1978) and Fear of Music (1979), with the producer Brian Eno. In January 1980, the members returned to New York City after touring for Fear of Music and took time off to pursue personal interests. Eno and Byrne recorded the album My Life in the Bush of Ghosts (1981). Eno described it as "a laboratory" for the next Talking Heads record.

Keyboardist Jerry Harrison produced an album for funk singer Nona Hendryx at Sigma Sound Studios' secondary facility in New York City; Talking Heads would later record at Sigma and employ Hendryx as a backing vocalist on Harrison's advice. Drummer Chris Frantz and bassist Tina Weymouth, a married couple, discussed leaving Talking Heads after Weymouth suggested that the singer, David Byrne, was too controlling. Frantz did not want to leave, and the two took a long vacation in the Caribbean to ponder the state of the band and their marriage. They became involved in Haitian Vodou religious ceremonies, practiced native percussion instruments, and socialized with the Jamaican rhythm section and production duo Sly and Robbie.

Frantz and Weymouth ended their vacation by purchasing an apartment above Compass Point Studios in Nassau, Bahamas, where Talking Heads and Eno had recorded More Songs About Buildings and Food. Byrne joined the duo and Harrison there in early 1980. The band members realized that songwriting had thus far been largely Byrne's responsibility, and that they had become tired of the notion of a singer and a backing band. The ideal they aimed for, according to Byrne, was "sacrificing our egos for mutual cooperation". Byrne also wanted to escape "the psychological paranoia and personal torment" they had been feeling and writing about in New York. Instead of writing music to Byrne's lyrics, the group performed extended instrumental jams, using the Fear of Music track "I Zimbra" as a foundation.

Eno arrived in the Bahamas three weeks after Byrne. Initially, Eno was uninterested in producing Talking Heads again, and wanted to pursue his interest in creating "African-psychedelic" music. However, he agreed to participate when he discovered that they were developing music based on grooves rather than traditional song structures, and that they were also interested in his African influences. Eno and the band experimented with the communal African way of making music, in which individual parts mesh as polyrhythms. Nigerian musician Fela Kuti's studio album Afrodisiac (1973) became their template. According to Weymouth, the emergence of hip-hop made the band realize that the musical landscape was changing. Before the studio sessions began, the band's friend David Gans told them that "the things one doesn't intend are the seeds for a more interesting future", encouraging them to experiment, improvise and make use of "mistakes".

== Recording and production ==
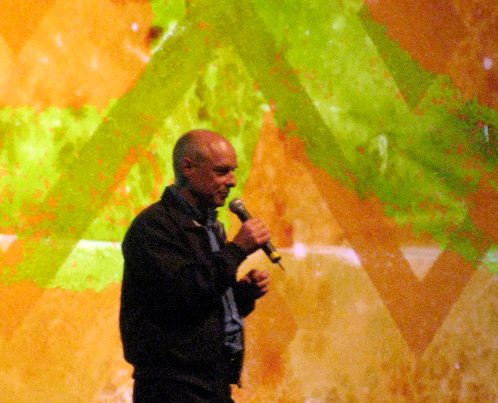
Brian Eno, here photographed in 2007, produced Remain in Light using stylised methods and sonic experiments.

Recording sessions started at Compass Point Studios in July 1980. The album required additional musicians, particularly percussionists. Talking Heads used the working title Melody Attack throughout the studio process after watching a Japanese game show of the same name. According to Harrison, the band's ambition was to blend rock and African genres rather than simply imitate African music. Eno's production techniques and personal approach were key to the record's conception. The process was geared to promote the expression of instinct and spontaneity, not overtly focusing on the sound of the final product. Eno compared the creative process to "looking out to the world and saying, 'What a fantastic place we live in. Let's celebrate it.'"

Sections and instrumentals were recorded one at a time in a discontinuous process. Loops played a key part at a time when computers could not yet adequately perform such functions. Talking Heads developed Remain in Light by recording jam sessions, isolating the best parts, and learning to play them repetitively. The basic tracks focused wholly on rhythms and were all performed in a minimalist method using only one chord. Each section was recorded as a long loop to enable the creation of compositions through the positioning or merging of loops in different ways. Byrne likened the process to modern sampling: "We were human samplers."

According to Frantz, the band had met with Jamaican reggae producer Lee "Scratch" Perry in New York and arranged to record with him at Compass Point, but he did not show up to the sessions. After a few sessions at Compass Point, engineer Rhett Davies left following an argument with Eno over the fast pace of recording, and Steven Stanley stepped in to replace him. The engineer Dave Jerden obtained a Lexicon 224 digital reverberation unit, one of the first of its kind. Like Davies, Jerden was unhappy with the fast pace at which Eno wanted to record, but did not complain.

The tracks made Byrne rethink his vocal style and he tried singing to the instrumental songs, but sounded "stilted". Few vocal sections were recorded in the Bahamas. The lyrics were written when the band returned to the U.S., in New York City and California. Harrison booked Talking Heads into Sigma Sound, which focused primarily on R&B, after convincing the owners that the band's work could bring them a new clientele. In New York City, Byrne struggled with writer's block, Harrison and Eno spent their time tweaking the compositions recorded in the Bahamas, and Frantz and Weymouth often did not show up at the studio. Doubts began to surface about whether the album would be completed, which were assuaged only after the recruitment of guitarist Adrian Belew at the request of Byrne, Harrison, and Eno. Belew was advised to add guitar solos to the Compass Point tracks, making use of numerous effects units and a Roland guitar synthesizer. Belew performed on the tracks that would become "Crosseyed and Painless", "The Great Curve", "Listening Wind" and "The Overload"; in 2022, he recalled that he recorded his parts in one day. Singer Robert Palmer, who had recorded his sixth studio album, Clues, at the same studio shortly before Talking Heads, contributed additional percussion.

Byrne recorded the rough mixes to a cassette tape and improvised over them on a portable tape recorder. He tried to create onomatopoeic rhymes in the style of Eno, who believed that lyrics were never the center of a song's meaning. Byrne continuously listened to his recorded scatting until convinced that he was no longer "hearing nonsense". After he was satisfied, Harrison invited Nona Hendryx to Sigma Sound to record backing vocals. She was advised extensively on her vocal delivery by Byrne, Frantz, and Weymouth, and often sang in a trio with Byrne and Eno. Brass player Jon Hassell, who had worked with Byrne and Eno on My Life in the Bush of Ghosts, was hired to perform trumpet and horn overdubs. In August 1980, half of the album was mixed by Eno, Harrison and the engineer John Potoker in New York City, while the other half was mixed by Byrne and Jerden at Eldorado Studios in Burbank, California. Eno later said he had not been able to take Remain in Light as far as he had wanted for fear of "usurping the compositional role any more than I had done already".

== Music and lyrics ==
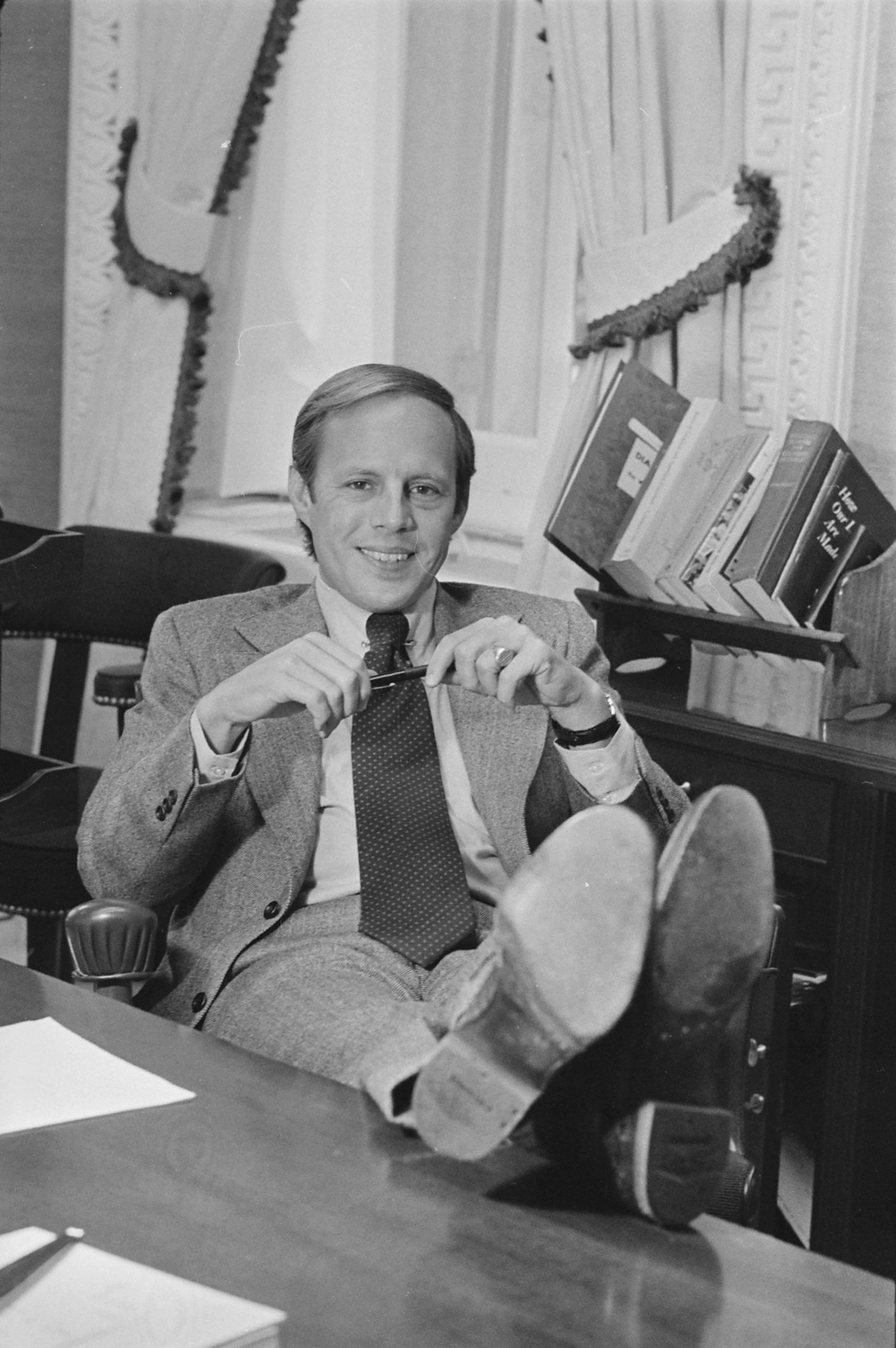
The testimony of Watergate scandal conspirator John Dean was one of several inspirations for the lyrics on Remain in Light.

Remain in Light has been described as new wave, post-punk, worldbeat, dance-rock, art pop, art rock, avant-pop, and psychedelic funk with Afrobeat influences. Critic Stephen Thomas Erlewine called it a "dense amalgam of African percussion, funk bass and keyboards, pop songs, and electronics." It contains eight songs with a "striking free-associative feel", according to psychoanalyst Michael A. Brog, in that there is no extended thought process that can be followed in its stream of consciousness lyrics. Gans instructed Byrne to be freer with his lyrical content, advising him that "rational thinking has its limits".

Byrne included a bibliography with the album press kit along with a statement that explained how the album was inspired by African mythologies and rhythms. The release stressed that the major inspiration for the lyrics was John Miller Chernoff's African Rhythm and African Sensibility (1981), which examined the musical enhancement of life in rural African communities. Chernoff travelled to Ghana in 1970 to study native percussion and wrote about how Africans have complicated conversations through drum patterns. One song, "The Great Curve", exemplifies the African theme with the line "The world moves on a woman's hips", which Byrne used after reading Robert Farris Thompson's book African Art in Motion (1974). He also studied straight speech, from Watergate scandal co-conspirator John Dean's testimony to the stories of African American former slaves.

Like the other tracks, album opener "Born Under Punches (The Heat Goes On)" borrows from "preaching, shouting and ranting". The expression "And the Heat Goes On", used in the title and repeated in the chorus, is based on a New York Post headline Eno read in the summer of 1980, while Byrne rewrote the song title "Don't Worry About the Government" from Talking Heads' debut studio album, Talking Heads: 77 (1977), into the lyric "Look at the hands of a government man". Although the unorthodox guitar solo has often been credited to Adrian Belew, it was in fact performed by Byrne (manipulating a Lexicon Prime Time digital delay unit).

The "rhythmical rant" in "Crosseyed and Painless"—"Facts are simple and facts are straight. Facts are lazy and facts are late"—was influenced by early hip-hop, specifically Kurtis Blow's "The Breaks", which was given to Byrne by Frantz. "Once in a Lifetime" borrows heavily from preachers' diatribes. While some critics deemed the song "a kind of prescient jab at the excesses of the 1980s", Byrne disagreed with this categorization and commented that its lyrics were meant to be taken literally: "We're largely unconscious. You know, we operate half awake or on autopilot and end up, whatever, with a house and family and job and everything else, and we haven't really stopped to ask ourselves, 'How did I get here?'."

"The Great Curve"
"The Great Curve" includes two lengthy solos by Adrian Belew's synthesiser-treated guitar, African-inspired percussion, and brass interludes. It features the line "The world moves on a woman's hips", inspired by Robert Farris Thompson's book African Art in Motion (1974).

Byrne described Remain in Light as "spiritual", "joyous and ecstatic ... yet serious". He said there was "less Africanism in Remain in Light than we implied ... but the African ideas were far more important to get across than specific rhythms". According to Eno, the record uniquely blends funk with punk rock and new wave. None of the songs include chord changes, relying instead on different harmonies and counter-melodies over pedal points. "Spidery" riffs and layered bass guitar and percussion are used extensively.

The first side contains the more rhythmic songs, "Born Under Punches (The Heat Goes On)", "Crosseyed and Painless", and "The Great Curve", which include long instrumental interludes. "The Great Curve" contains extended guitar solos by Belew, the first contributions that he made during his day in the studio. Belew performed used an Electro-Harmonix Big Muff distortion unit, an Alembic Strat-o-Blaster preamp circuit, an equalizer, and an Electro-Harmonix Electric Mistress flanger.

The second side features more introspective songs. "Once in a Lifetime" pays homage to early rap techniques and the music of the Velvet Underground. It had the working title "Weird Guitar Riff Song". It was conceived as a single riff before the band added a second; Eno alternated eight bars of each riff with corresponding bars of its counterpart. "Houses in Motion" incorporates long brass performances by Hassell.

"Listening Wind" features Arabic music influences, with Belew adding textural content via the Electric Mistress and "[bending] the sound up and down while working a delay and the volume control on my guitar". The lyrics, meanwhile, sympathetically portray an anti-American terrorist who engages in bombing campaigns in response to American settler colonialism in his home country. In a 2004 interview with the Sunday Herald, Byrne described the song as partly reflective of his understanding of the motivations for terrorism, stating "I understand why America is not universally loved. That's been obvious to me for years and years, but it's not obvious to a lot of Americans. Their immediate reaction is, 'They love us, they're just jealous. They just want McDonald's.'" The closing track, "The Overload", features "tribal-cum-industrial" beats created primarily by Harrison and Byrne alongside Belew's "growling guitar atmospherics".

== Packaging and title ==
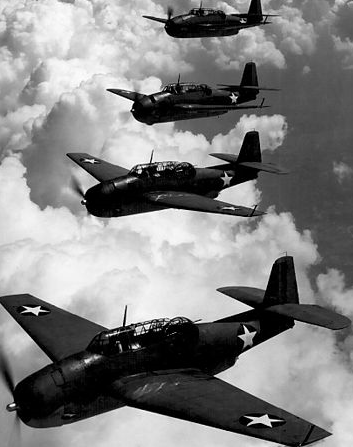
Grumman Avengers, used by the United States Navy, in which Weymouth's father had served, inspired the initial cover art, later used on the back of the LP sleeve after the album name change.

Weymouth and Frantz conceived the cover art with the help of Massachusetts Institute of Technology researcher Walter Bender and his ArcMac team (the precursor to the MIT Media Lab). Using Melody Attack as inspiration, the couple created a collage of red warplanes flying in formation over the Himalayas. The planes are an artistic depiction of Grumman Avenger planes in honor of Weymouth's father, Ralph Weymouth, who was a US Navy Admiral. The idea for the back cover included simple portraits of the band members. Weymouth attended MIT regularly in mid-1980 and worked with Bender's colleague, Scott Fisher, on the computer renditions of the ideas. The process was tortuous because computer power was limited in the early 1980s and the mainframe alone took up several rooms. Weymouth and Fisher shared a passion for masks and used the concept to experiment with the portraits. The faces were blotted out with blocks of red. As Eno wanted to be featured on the cover art as well, Weymouth considered superimposing Eno's face on top of all four portraits to insinuate his egotism, but decided against it.

The rest of the artwork and the liner notes were crafted by graphic designer Tibor Kalman and his company M & Co. Kalman was a fervent critic of formalism and professional design in art and advertisements. He offered his services for free to create publicity, and discussed using unconventional materials such as sandpaper and velour for the LP sleeve. Weymouth, who was skeptical of hiring a designing firm, vetoed Kalman's ideas and held firm on the MIT images. The designing process made the band members realize that the title Melody Attack was "too flippant" for the music, and they adopted Remain in Light instead. Byrne has said, "Besides not being all that melodic, the music had something to say that at the time seemed new, transcendent, and maybe even revolutionary, at least for funk rock songs." The image of the warplanes was relegated to the back of the sleeve and the doctored portraits became the front cover. Kalman later suggested that the planes were not removed altogether because they seemed appropriate during the then-ongoing Iran hostage crisis.

Tina Weymouth and Tibor Kalman designed the logotype used on the album cover.

Weymouth advised Kalman that she wanted simple typography in a bold sans-serif font. M & Co. complied. Kalman came up with the idea of inverting the "A"s in "TALKING HEADS". Weymouth and Frantz decided to use the joint credit acronym C/T for the artwork, while Bender and Fisher used initials and code names because the project was not an official MIT venture. The design credits read "HCL, JPT, DDD, WALTER GP, PAUL, C/T". The final mass-produced version of Remain in Light had one of the first computer-designed record jackets. Psychoanalyst Michael A. Brog called its cover a "disarming image, which suggests both splitting and obliteration of identity", and which introduces the listener to the theme of "identity disturbance ... The image is in bleak contrast to the title with the obscured images of the band members unable to 'remain in light'."

Talking Heads and Eno originally agreed to credit all songs in alphabetical order to "David Byrne, Brian Eno, Chris Frantz, Jerry Harrison and Tina Weymouth" after failing to devise an accurate formula for the split, but the album was released with the label credit: "all songs written by David Byrne & Brian Eno (except "Houses in Motion" and 'The Overload", written by David Byrne, Brian Eno & Jerry Harrison)". Frantz, Harrison, and Weymouth disputed the credits, especially for a process they had partly funded. According to Weymouth, Byrne told Kalman to doctor the credits on Eno's advice. Later editions credit all band members. Frantz said in 2009 that he and Weymouth "felt very burned by the credits dispute". Eno later said he and Byrne had received too much credit.

== Promotion and release ==
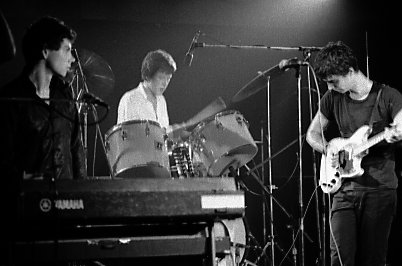
Talking Heads hired five additional musicians for the Remain in Light promotional tours.

Eno advised Talking Heads that the music on Remain in Light was too dense for a quartet to perform live. The band expanded to nine musicians for the tours in support of the album, with Harrison recruiting Belew, Parliament-Funkadelic keyboardist Bernie Worrell, bassist Busta "Cherry" Jones, Ashford & Simpson percussionist Steven Scales, and backing vocalist Dolette MacDonald. The larger group performed soundchecks in Frantz's and Weymouth's loft by following the rhythms established by Worrell, who had studied at the New England Conservatory (NEC) and Juilliard School.

The expanded band's first appearance was on August 23, 1980, at the Heatwave festival in Ontario, Canada, for an audience of 70,000; Robert Hilburn of the Los Angeles Times called the band's new music a "rock-funk sound with dramatic, near show-stopping force". On August 27, the expanded Talking Heads performed a showcase of tracks to an 8,000-person full house at the Wollman Rink, as well as approximately another 10,000 seated on the grass outside the walls, in Central Park. Only these two performances were initially planned, but Sire Records decided to support the nine-member band on an extended tour. After the promotional tour, the band went on hiatus for several years, leaving the individual members to pursue a variety of side projects.

Remain in Light was released worldwide on October 8, 1980, and received its world premiere, airing in its entirety, on October 10 on WDFM. According to writer David Sheppard, "It was received as a great cultural event as much as a vivid art-pop record." Unusually, the press release included a bibliography submitted by Byrne and Eno citing books by Chernoff and others to provide context for how the songs were conceived. “I didn't read those books," said an incensed Weymouth.

Remain in Light was certified gold in Canada in February 1981 after shipping 50,000 copies, and in the US in September 1985 after shipping 500,000. Over one million copies have been sold worldwide.

== Critical reception ==
Retrospective professional ratings
Review scores
Source	Rating
AllMusic	5/5 stars
Chicago Tribune	4/4 stars
Christgau's Record Guide	A
The Irish Times	5/5 stars
Mojo	5/5 stars
Pitchfork	10/10
Rolling Stone	5/5 stars
The Rolling Stone Album Guide	5/5 stars
Spin Alternative Record Guide	10/10
Uncut	5/5 stars

Remain in Light attained acclaim. Ken Tucker of Rolling Stone felt it was a brave and absorbing attempt to locate a common ground in the era's divergent and often hostile musical genres; he concluded, "Remain in Light yields scary, funny music to which you can dance and think, think and dance, dance and think, ad infinitum." Robert Christgau, in The Village Voice, said "Byrne conquers his fear of music in a visionary Afrofunk synthesis—clear-eyed, detached, almost mystically optimistic". Michael Kulp of the Daily Collegian wrote that Remain in Light deserved the tag "classic" like each of the band's three previous full-length releases, while John Rockwell, writing in The New York Times, suggested that it confirmed Talking Heads' position as "America's most venturesome rock band". Sandy Robertson of Sounds praised the record's innovation, while Billboard wrote, "Just about every LP Talking Heads has released in the last four years has wound up on virtually every critics' best of list. Remain in Light should be no exception."

AllMusic's William Ruhlmann wrote that Talking Heads' musical transition, first witnessed in Fear of Music, came to full fruition in Remain in Light: "Talking Heads were connecting with an audience ready to follow their musical evolution, and the album was so inventive and influential." In the 1995 Spin Alternative Record Guide, Jeff Salamon praised Eno for reining in any excessive appropriations of African music. In 2004, Slant Magazine's Barry Walsh labeled its results "simply magical" after the band turned rock music into a more global entity in terms of its musical and lyrical scope. In a 2008 review, Sean Fennessey of Vibe concluded, "Talking Heads took African polyrhythms to NYC and made a return trip with elegant, alien post-punk in tow."

=== Accolades and legacy ===
"So they congregated in a Nassau studio with Brian Eno and created a record without precedent ... Both daringly experimental and pop-accessible, Remain in Light may be the Talking Heads' defining moment."

— Pitchfork founder Ryan Schreiber, 2002

Remain in Light was named the best album of 1980 by Sounds and Melody Maker, the second-best (behind the London Calling by the Clash) by Christgau, and the sixth-best by NME. It was voted the third-best (behind London Calling and The River by Bruce Springsteen) in The Village Voice's Pazz & Jop critics' poll, which aggregates the votes of hundreds of reviewers. The New York Times named it one of the year's 10 best albums.

Remain in Light was named the fourth-best album of the 1980s by Rolling Stone in 1989, the 11th-best by NME in 1993, the second-best by Pitchfork (behind the 1988 Sonic Youth album Daydream Nation) in 2002 and the sixth-best by Slant Magazine in 2012. It was ranked the 68th-best album ever by NME in 1993 and the 43rd-best in a 1997 poll of critics, artists, and DJs by The Guardian. In 1999, Vibe named it one of the 20th century's 100 essential albums. In 2000, it was included in the book All Time Top 1000 Albums by Colin Larkin at number 227. In 2003, VH1 named Remain in Light the 88th-best album ever, and Slant Magazine included it in its list of 50 essential pop albums.

Rolling Stone placed Remain in Light at number 126 on its 2003 list of "The 500 Greatest Albums of All Time", the highest of four Talking Heads albums on the list. It was placed at number 129 in the revised 2012 list and number 39 in the 2020 list. In 2016, Paste named Remain in Light the fourth-best post-punk album. Staff writer Bonnie Stiernberg wrote: "Polyrhythmic, lyrically cryptic and featuring one of the most awesomely weird guitar solos of all time (Adrien Belew's blippy genius on "Born Under Punches"), Remain in Light stands as David Byrne and company's masterpiece. It's rooted in tradition, yet it sounds delightfully futuristic—even three decades after its initial release."

Radiohead credited Remain in Light as an influence on their fourth album, Kid A (2000). The Radiohead guitarist Jonny Greenwood had assumed it was composed of loops, but learnt from Harrison that Talking Heads had instead played the parts repetitively. Greenwood said: "That's why it's not exhausting to listen to because you're not hearing the same piece of music over and over again. You're hearing it slightly different every time. There's a lesson there."

In 2018, the Beninese singer Angélique Kidjo released a song-for-song cover of Remain in Light, produced by Jeff Bhasker and released on his Kravenworks label. She described herself as a longtime fan of "Once in a Lifetime", and wanted to pay tribute by emphasizing its inspiration from African music.

In 2022, Harrison and Belew united for three concert dates for the album's 40th anniversary, in which they played all of the album and several more Talking Heads songs. In 2023, they expanded the project to a full North American tour, and included material from Belew's period in the Talking Heads-influenced 1980s incarnation of King Crimson.

== Track listing ==
All lyrics are written by David Byrne, except "Born Under Punches (The Heat Goes On)" and "Crosseyed and Painless", written by David Byrne and Brian Eno; all music is composed by Talking Heads (Byrne, Chris Frantz, Jerry Harrison, and Tina Weymouth) and Eno.

Side one
No.	Title	Length
1.	"Born Under Punches (The Heat Goes On)"	5:49
2.	"Crosseyed and Painless"	4:48
3.	"The Great Curve"	6:28
Total length:		16:25

Side two
No.	Title	Length
1.	"Once in a Lifetime"	4:19
2.	"Houses in Motion"	4:33
3.	"Seen and Not Seen"	3:25
4.	"Listening Wind"	4:43
5.	"The Overload"	6:25
Total length:		23:25

2006 reissue bonus tracks
No.	Title	Length
9.	"Fela's Riff" (Unfinished Outtake)	5:15
10.	"Unison" (Unfinished Outtake)	4:58
11.	"Double Groove" (Unfinished Outtake)	4:28
12.	"Right Start" (Unfinished Outtake)	4:07

== Personnel ==
Those involved in the making of Remain in Light were:

Talking Heads

- David Byrne – lead vocals, guitars, bass guitar, keyboards, percussion, vocal arrangements
- Jerry Harrison – keyboards, guitars, percussion, backing vocals
- Tina Weymouth – bass guitar, keyboards, percussion, backing vocals
- Chris Frantz – drums, percussion, keyboards, backing vocals

Additional musicians

- Brian Eno – keyboards, guitars, bass guitar, percussion, backing vocals, vocal arrangements
- Adrian Belew – electric guitar, vocals, Roland guitar synthesizer (2, 3, 7, 8)
- Robert Palmer – percussion
- José Rossy – percussion
- Jon Hassell – trumpets, horns
- Nona Hendryx – backing vocals

Production

- Brian Eno – producer, mixing
- Dave Jerden – engineer, mixing
- David Byrne – mixing
- John Potoker – additional engineer, mixing
- Rhett Davies – additional engineer
- Jack Nuber – additional engineer
- Steven Stanley – additional engineer
- Kendall Stubbs – additional engineer
- Greg Calbi – mastering at Sterling Sound, New York
- Tina Weymouth – cover art
- Chris Frantz – cover art
- Walter Bender – cover art assistant
- Scott Fisher – cover art assistant
- Tibor Kalman – artwork
- Carol Bokuniewics – artwork
- MIT Architecture Machine Group – computer rendering

== Charts ==
Weekly chart performance of Remain in Light
Chart (1980/81)	Peak position
Australia (Kent Music Report)	25
Canadian Albums Chart	6
New Zealand Albums Chart	8
Norwegian Albums Chart	28
Swedish Albums Chart	26
UK Albums Chart	21
US Billboard 200	19

Weekly chart performance for Remain in Light
Chart (2023)	Peak position
Croatian International Albums (HDU)	10
Hungarian Physical Albums (MAHASZ)	23

Year-end chart performance for Remain in Light
Chart (1981)	Position
US Billboard 200	87

== Certifications and sales ==
Certifications and sales for Remain in Light
Region	Certification	Certified units/sales
Canada (Music Canada)	Gold	50,000^{^}
United Kingdom (BPI)	Gold	100,000^{‡}
United States (RIAA)	Gold	500,000^{^}
^{^} Shipments figures based on certification alone.^{‡} Sales+streaming figures based on certification alone.

== See also ==
- Everything That Happens Will Happen Today
- Live Phish Volume 15

== Bibliography ==
- Bowman, David (2001). This Must Be the Place: The Adventures of Talking Heads in the Twentieth Century. HarperCollins. ISBN 0-380-97846-6.
- Brog, Michael A. (June 2002). ""Living Turned Inside Out": The Musical Expression of Psychotic and Schizoid Experience in Talking Heads' Remain in Light". The American Journal of Psychoanalysis. 62 (2): 163–184. doi:10.1023/A:1015181228250. PMID 12085527. S2CID 6496084.
- Pareles, Jon (May 1982). "Talking Heads Talk". Mother Jones. pp. 36–39.
