= Once in a Lifetime (Talking Heads song) =

1981 single by Talking Heads

- Cover art of UK 7-inch and 12-inch vinyl singles

Single by Talking Heads

from the album Remain in Light
- B-side: "Seen and Not Seen"; "Crosseyed and Painless"; "Listening Wind"
- Released: January 1981
- Recorded: July–August 1980
- Studio: Compass Point (Nassau, Bahamas); Sigma Sound (New York City)
- Genre: New wave; rock; art pop
- Length: 4:19
- Label: Sire
- Composers: David Byrne; Brian Eno; Chris Frantz; Jerry Harrison; Tina Weymouth
- Lyricist: David Byrne
- Producer: Brian Eno

Talking Heads singles chronology
"Crosseyed and Painless" (1980)	"Once in a Lifetime" (1981)	"Houses in Motion" (1980)
"And She Was" (1985)	"Once in a Lifetime" (live) (1985)	"Wild Wild Life" (1986)

Music video
- "Once in a Lifetime" on YouTube

"Once in a Lifetime" is a song by the American rock band Talking Heads, produced and cowritten by Brian Eno. It was released in January 1981 by Sire Records as the first single from Talking Heads' fourth album, Remain in Light (1980).

Eno and Talking Heads developed "Once in a Lifetime" through jams, inspired by Afrobeat musicians such as Fela Kuti. David Byrne's vocals were inspired by preachers delivering sermons, with lyrics about existential crisis and the unconscious. In the music video, directed by Byrne and Toni Basil, Byrne dances erratically over footage of religious rituals.

"Once in a Lifetime" was certified platinum in the UK in 2023. In 1986, a live version taken from the 1984 concert film Stop Making Sense entered the US Billboard Hot 100. It has been covered and sampled by multiple acts.

NPR named "Once in a Lifetime" one of the 100 most important American musical works of the 20th century, and the Rock and Roll Hall of Fame named it one of the "500 Songs that Shaped Rock and Roll". Rolling Stone placed it at number 28 on its 2021 list of "The 500 Greatest Songs of All Time", and named its music video the 81st-best. In 2026, CBS included it in its list of the 250 essential American songs of the past 250 years.

== Production ==
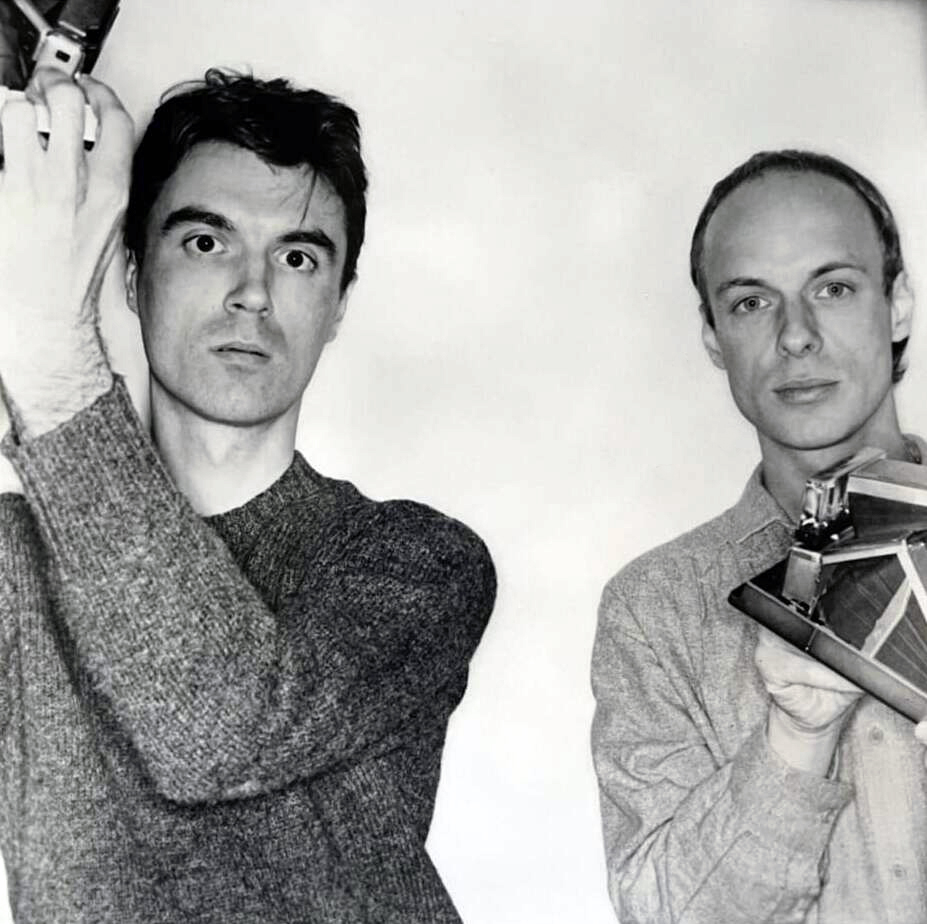
David Byrne (left) and Brian Eno in 1981

Like other songs on Remain in Light, Talking Heads and the producer Brian Eno recorded "Once in a Lifetime" at Compass Point Studios in Nassau, Bahamas. To write songs, the group recorded jams, isolated the best parts and learnt to play them repetitively. The English singer Robert Palmer joined the jam on guitar and percussion.

The technique was influenced by early hip-hop, and Afrobeat artists such as Fela Kuti, which Eno had introduced to Talking Heads. The vocalist, David Byrne, likened the process to modern looping and sampling, describing the band as "human samplers". He said "Once in a Lifetime" was a result of the band trying and failing to play funk, inadvertently creating something new instead. After the engineer Rhett Davies left following an argument with Eno over the fast pace of recording, Steven Stanley replaced him to record the basic tracks.

"Once in a Lifetime" was initially not one of Eno's favorites and it was almost abandoned. The keyboardist, Jerry Harrison, said the lack of chord changes and the "trance"-like feeling was hard to delineate into verses and choruses. However, Byrne felt he could write lyrics to it. Eno developed the chorus melody by singing wordlessly, and the song "fell into place". Harrison developed the "bubbly" synthesizer arpeggio, and added the Hammond organ climax, inspired by the Velvet Underground's 1969 song "What Goes On".

Eno interpreted the rhythm differently from the band, interpreting the third beat of each bar as the first. He encouraged the band members to interpret the beat in different ways, thereby exaggerating different rhythmic elements. According to Eno, "This means the song has a funny balance, with two centers of gravity – their funk groove, and my dubby, reggae-ish understanding of it; a bit like the way Fela Kuti songs will have multiple rhythms going on at the same time, warping in and out of each other."

According to the bassist, Tina Weymouth, the drummer, Chris Frantz, created the bassline by yelling during a jam, which she mimicked on bass guitar. She wanted to leave space for the "cacophony" around her, and said: "I felt like I was pounding away like a carpenter, just nailing away to get it in the groove." Eno removed the first bass note from the first beat of the bar, as he felt it was too "obvious", and rerecorded the part. When Talking Heads returned to New York City without Eno, the engineer had Weymouth record the bassline again. She said: "It wasn't a big fight between me and Brian, as it has sometimes been portrayed, it was just a musical dispute."

== Lyrics ==
Byrne improvised lines as if he were giving a sermon, with a call and response chorus like a preacher and congregation. His vocals are "half-spoken, half-sung", with lyrics about living in a "beautiful house" with a "beautiful wife" and a "large automobile".

The Guardian writer Jack Malcolm suggested that "Once in a Lifetime" can be read "as an art-pop rumination on the existential ticking time bomb of unchecked consumerism and advancing age". According to the AllMusic critic Steve Huey, the lyrics address "the drudgery of living life according to social expectations, and pursuing commonly accepted trophies (a large automobile, beautiful house, beautiful wife)". Although the narrator has these trophies, he questions whether they are real and how he acquired them, a kind of existential crisis. The Australian songwriter David Bridie connected the mentions of water in the gospel-like chorus to Harrison's "watery" synthesizer arpeggio.

Byrne denied that the lyrics address yuppie greed and said they were about the unconscious: "We operate half-awake or on autopilot and end up, whatever, with a house and family and job and everything else, and we haven't really stopped to ask ourselves, 'How did I get here?'" Eno said that Byrne combined the "blood-and-thunder intonation of the preacher" with optimistic lyrics: "It's saying what a fantastic place we live in, let's celebrate it. That was a radical thing to do when everyone was so miserable and gray!"

== Music video ==
In the music video, Byrne dances erratically over footage of religious rituals, dressed in a suit, bowtie and glasses.

In the "Once in a Lifetime" music video, Byrne appears in a large, empty white room, dressed in a suit, bowtie and glasses. In the background, inserted via bluescreen, footage of religious rituals or multiple Byrnes appears. Byrne dances erratically, imitating the movements of the rituals and moving in "spasmic" full-body contortions. At the end, a "normal" version of Byrne appears in a black room, dressed in a white open-collared shirt without glasses.

The video was directed by Byrne and Toni Basil and choreographed by Basil. They studied archive footage of rituals by groups including African tribes, Japanese sects, people in trances, and Christian evangelists such as Ernest Angley. Byrne said he studied "the general phenomenon of religious ecstasy" and derived movements from them, making them into "a sort of spastic dance". According to Basil, "David kind of choreographed himself. I set up the camera, put him in front of it, and asked him to absorb those ideas. Then I left the room so he could be alone with himself ... I just helped to stylize his moves a little."

To emphasize Byrne's jerky movements, Basil used an "old-fashioned" zoom lens. The video was made on a low budget; Basil described it as "about as low-tech as you could get and still be broadcastable". Byrne wanted it to be a standalone artwork and more than a promotional product.

== Release ==
In 1981, "Once in a Lifetime" reached number 24 on the Dutch Top 40 in February and number 14 on the UK singles chart in March. In the UK, it was certified silver in January 2018, gold in April 2021 and platinum in December 2023. After Byrne performed "Once in a Lifetime" on Saturday Night Live in February 2020, it entered number 10 on the Billboard Rock Digital Song Sales. A 12-inch promotional dance club mix was released in October 1984. A live version, taken from the 1984 concert film Stop Making Sense, reached number 91 on the US Billboard Hot 100 in 1986. An early version, "Right Start", was released on the 2006 reissue of Remain in Light.

== Legacy ==
In 2000, NPR named "Once in a Lifetime" one of the 100 most important American musical works of the 20th century. In 2016, the Rock and Roll Hall of Fame listed it as one of the "500 Songs that Shaped Rock and Roll", and Malcolm Jack wrote in The Guardian that it was "a thing of dizzying power, beauty and mystery" that "sounds like nothing else in the history of pop". When the musician Travis Morrison appeared on NPR's All Songs Considered, he selected "Once in a Lifetime" as a perfect song and said: "The lyrics are astounding; they are meaningless and totally meaningful at the same time. That's as good as rock lyrics get." The writer Paul Elie said "Once in a Lifetime" contained "some of the most unforgettable vocal work of our time".

Rolling Stone ranked "Once in a Lifetime" number 28 on its 2021 list of the "500 Greatest Songs of All Time". In 2023, the Australian songwriter David Bridie wrote that it was the most perfect song of all time, writing that it was "cool and edgy" and yet could be played in supermarkets. In the same year, American Songwriter named it the third-best Talking Heads song, and Record World called it "a polyrhythmic journey through his heart of darkness ... the vocal intensity and melodic beauty are enthralling". In 2026, CBS included it in its list of the 250 essential American songs of the past 250 years.

In 1989, Spin readers voted the "Once in a Lifetime" video the sixth-best of the 1980s. In 2003, the BBC critic Chris Jones described it as "hilarious" and said it remained compelling. In 2021, Rolling Stone named it the 81st-best music video. "Weird Al" Yankovic recreated it in the video for his 1989 song "UHF", with a similar suit and dance.

The Beninese musician Angélique Kidjo recorded a cover of "Once in a Lifetime" as part of her 2018 song-for-song cover album of Remain in Light. Other artists who have covered "Once in a Lifetime" include the Smashing Pumpkins, Phish, PM Dawn, Kiki and Herb, Wasis Diop and Jimmy Buffett, and sampled by hip-hop artists and producers including Jay-Z. In 1996, Kermit the Frog performed it on Muppets Tonight while wearing Byrne's "big suit" and mimicking his dances from Stop Making Sense. "Once in a Lifetime" has appeared in films such as Down and Out in Beverly Hills (1986) and The Truman Show (1998) and television shows such as The Family Man, Lost, Numbers and The Simpsons.

== Charts ==
Original version
Chart (1981)	Peak position
Australian Singles Chart	23
Canadian Singles Chart	28
Netherlands (Dutch Top 40)	28
Netherlands (Single Top 100)	24
Irish Singles Chart	16
UK singles chart	14
US Billboard Bubbling Under the Hot 100	103

Live version
Chart (1985)	Peak position
Dutch Singles Chart	22
New Zealand Singles Chart	15
US Billboard Hot 100	91

== Certifications ==
Region	Certification	Certified units/sales
New Zealand (RMNZ)	Platinum	30,000^{‡}
United Kingdom (BPI)	Platinum	600,000^{‡}
^{‡} Sales+streaming figures based on certification alone.
