= Crosseyed and Painless =

- German retail 12" vinyl cover art

Single by Talking Heads

from the album Remain in Light
- B-side: "The Great Curve"
- Released: August 1980 (US, promotional), November 1981 (Germany)
- Genre: New wave; dance-rock
- Length: 4:48; 5:37 (video version)
- Label: Sire
- Composers: David Byrne; Brian Eno; Chris Frantz; Jerry Harrison; Tina Weymouth
- Lyricists: David Byrne; Brian Eno
- Producer: Brian Eno

Talking Heads singles chronology
"Cities" (1980)	"Crosseyed and Painless" (1980)	"Once in a Lifetime" (1981)

Audio video
- "Crosseyed and Painless" on YouTube

"Crosseyed and Painless" is a song by American new wave band Talking Heads. It was released in 1980 in the United States as a promotional single and in Germany in 1981 as a regular single from the band's fourth studio album, Remain in Light. Although the single failed to reach the US main chart, it reached No. 20 on the US Dance chart, becoming Talking Heads' highest-charting dance single. The band chose this song for their second music video, which was released in 1981.

== Song style ==
The song uses instruments and techniques such as cowbell loops, congas, bells, staccato guitar rhythms, and electronic blips. The rhythm of the song, as well as the use of the congas, add an African feel to the song.

== Lyrics ==
The lyrics discuss a paranoid and alienated man who feels he is stressed by his urban surroundings. These lyrics are of common theme for Talking Heads and categorize lead singer David Byrne's writing style. The "rhythmical rant" in "Crosseyed and Painless"—"Facts are simple and facts are straight. Facts are lazy and facts are late."—is influenced by old-school rap, specifically Kurtis Blow's "The Breaks" given to Byrne by Frantz. The singer is filled with doubt and is not even sure he can believe facts. By the end of the song, he expresses his resentment of facts: "Facts don't do what I want them to do / Facts just twist the truth around."

== Critical reception ==
"Crosseyed and Painless" is widely regarded as one of Talking Heads' best songs. In 2023, American Songwriter ranked the song number ten on their list of the 10 greatest Talking Heads songs, and in 2024, Paste ranked the song number seven on their list of the 30 greatest Talking Heads songs.

== Music video ==
The music video for "Crosseyed and Painless", lasting 5:37, was directed by Toni Basil and by their own request did not feature the members of the band. Instead it featured street dancers (including Stephen "Skeeter Rabbit" Nichols), chosen by David Byrne, and who Basil said had creative input in the choreography for the video. Using locking and popping techniques, the dancers engage in various dance mimes of hustling, knife crime, posing, solicitation and street fighting. The video mix includes an additional verse not heard on the LP mix of the song.
