= Talking Heads =

American rock band

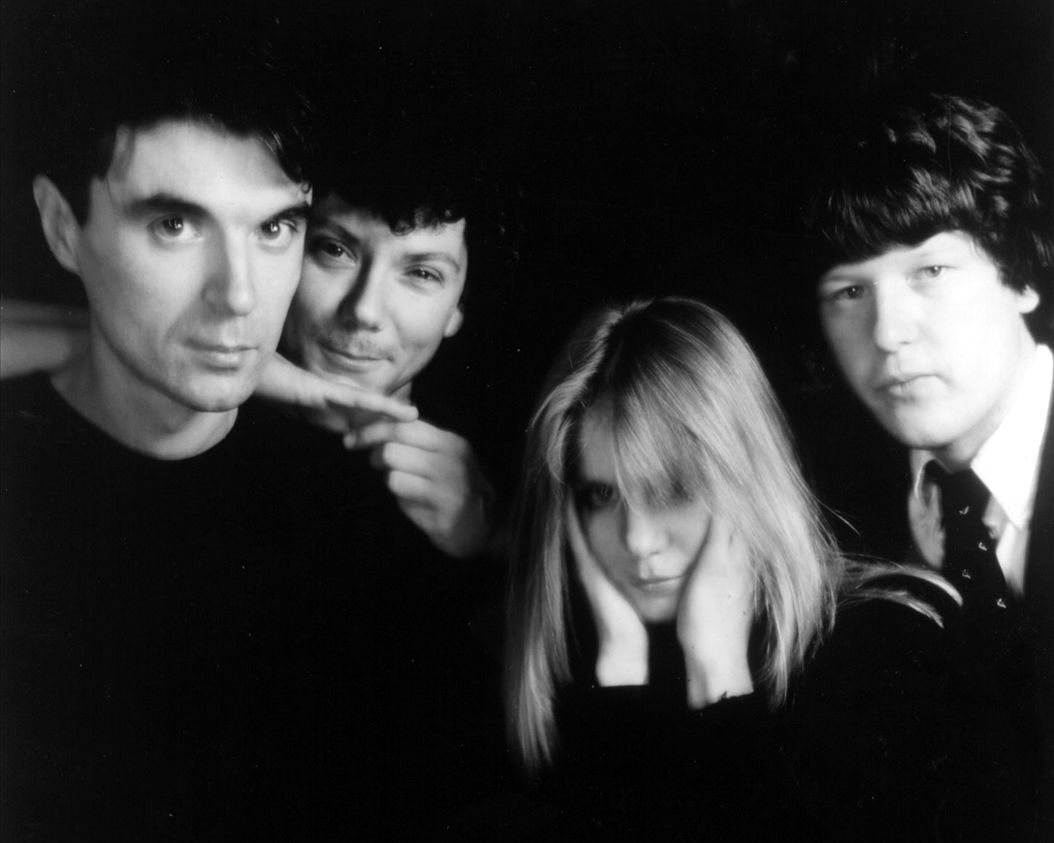
- From left: David Byrne, Jerry Harrison, Tina Weymouth, Chris Frantz (c. 1980)

Background information
- Also known as: Shrunken Heads; The Heads
- Origin: New York City, U.S.
- Genres: New wave; punk rock; art punk; post-punk; avant-funk; art pop; worldbeat
- Works: Discography; songs
- Years active: 1975–1991
- Labels: Sire; Warner Bros.
- Spinoffs: Tom Tom Club; The Heads
- Past members: David Byrne; Chris Frantz; Tina Weymouth; Jerry Harrison
- Website: talkingheadsofficial.com

Talking Heads were an American rock band formed in New York City in 1975. The band consisted of lead vocalist and guitarist David Byrne, drummer Chris Frantz, bassist Tina Weymouth, and guitarist and keyboardist Jerry Harrison. One of the most acclaimed groups of the 1970s and 1980s, Talking Heads helped to pioneer new wave music by combining elements of punk, art rock, funk, and world music with "an anxious yet clean-cut image".

Byrne, Frantz, and Weymouth met at the Rhode Island School of Design, where Byrne and Frantz were part of the band the Artistics. The trio moved to New York City in 1975, adopted the name Talking Heads, joined the New York punk scene, and recruited Harrison. They signed to Sire Records in 1976 and released their debut album, Talking Heads: 77, the following year to positive reviews. They collaborated with the British producer Brian Eno on the acclaimed albums More Songs About Buildings and Food (1978), Fear of Music (1979), and Remain in Light (1980), which blended their artistic sensibilities with influence from artists such as Parliament-Funkadelic and Fela Kuti. A cover of Al Green's "Take Me to the River" was their first Billboard Top 30 hit. In the 1980s, they added musicians to their recording sessions and shows, including guitarist Adrian Belew, keyboardist Bernie Worrell, singer Nona Hendryx, and bassist Busta Jones. They produced the live album The Name of This Band Is Talking Heads (1982).

Talking Heads achieved their commercial peak with their fifth studio album, Speaking in Tongues (1983), featuring "Burning Down the House" and "This Must Be the Place (Naive Melody)". Their show at the Hollywood Pantages Theatre was featured in Jonathan Demme's Stop Making Sense (1984), often regarded as the greatest concert film of all time. They had further commercial success with Little Creatures (1985), their best-selling studio album, featuring "And She Was" and "Road to Nowhere". They produced a soundtrack album for Byrne's film True Stories (1986), which produced the single "Wild Wild Life". They bowed out with the worldbeat-influenced Naked (1988), which produced "(Nothing But) Flowers". Byrne departed in 1991, and for a time the other band members performed under the name Shrunken Heads. They released the album No Talking, Just Head (1996) as the Heads, featuring various singers, before disbanding. While the band has appeared publicly together for promotional appearances in the years since their disbandment, they have rejected offers to reunite, with the exception of a short one-off performance at the band's Rock and Roll Hall of Fame induction ceremony in 2002.

Four Talking Heads albums appeared on Rolling Stone's 2003 list of the "500 Greatest Albums of All Time", and "Psycho Killer", "Life During Wartime", and "Once in a Lifetime" were included among the Rock and Roll Hall of Fame's 500 Songs that Shaped Rock and Roll. The band was also ranked number 64 on VH1's list of the "100 Greatest Artists of All Time". In the 2011 update of Rolling Stone's list of the "100 Greatest Artists of All Time", they were ranked number 100.

== History ==
=== 1973–1977: Early years ===
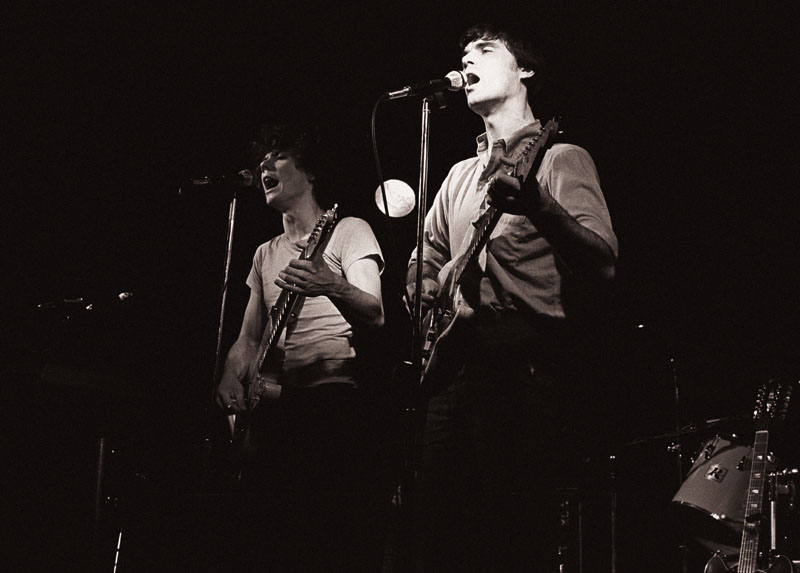
Jerry Harrison and David Byrne on guitars, Minneapolis, 1977

In 1973, Rhode Island School of Design students David Byrne (guitar and vocals) and Chris Frantz (drums) formed a band, the Artistics. Frantz has described the Artistics as a "prototype punk band" that would perform a number of covers, including the Sonics's "Psycho", the Who's "I Can't Explain" and Al Green's "Love and Happiness", live. Fellow student Tina Weymouth, Frantz's girlfriend, often provided transportation. The Artistics dissolved the following year, and the three moved to New York City, eventually sharing a communal loft. After they were unable to find a bassist, Weymouth took up the role. Frantz encouraged Weymouth to learn to play bass by listening to Suzi Quatro albums. Byrne asked Weymouth to audition three times before she joined the band.

The band played their first gig as Talking Heads—opening for the Ramones at CBGB in the East Village—on June 5, 1975. According to Weymouth, the name Talking Heads came from an issue of TV Guide, which "explained the term used by TV studios to describe a head-and-shoulder shot of a person talking as 'all content, no action'. It fit." Later that year, the band recorded a series of demos for CBS, but did not receive a record contract. However, they drew a following and signed to Sire Records in November 1976. They released their first single in February the following year, "Love → Building on Fire". In January 1977, they added Jerry Harrison, formerly of the Modern Lovers, on keyboards, guitar, and backing vocals. Gary Kurfirst started managing Talking Heads in 1977.

Their debut album, Talking Heads: 77, received acclaim and produced their first charting single, "Psycho Killer". Many connected the song to the serial killer known as the Son of Sam, who had been terrorizing New York City months earlier; however, Byrne said he had written the song years prior. Weymouth and Frantz married in 1977.

=== 1978–1980: Collaborations with Brian Eno ===
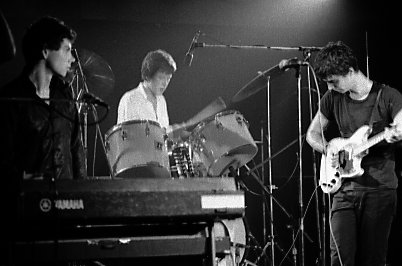
Harrison (left), Frantz (middle) and Byrne (right) performing with Talking Heads in 1978

More Songs About Buildings and Food (1978) was Talking Heads' first collaboration with producer Brian Eno, who had previously worked with Roxy Music, David Bowie, John Cale, and Robert Fripp; the title of Eno's 1977 song "King's Lead Hat" is an anagram of the band's name. Eno's unusual style meshed with the group's artistic sensibilities, and they began to explore an increasingly diverse range of musical directions—from psychedelic funk to Afrobeat, influenced prominently by Fela Kuti and Parliament-Funkadelic. This recording also established the band's relationship with Compass Point Studios in Nassau, The Bahamas. More Songs About Buildings and Food included a cover of Al Green's "Take Me to the River", which brought Talking Heads into the public consciousness and gave them their first Billboard Top 30 hit.

The collaboration continued with Fear of Music (1979), which mixed the darker stylings of post-punk rock with funk and subliminal references to the geopolitical instability of the late 1970s. Music journalist Simon Reynolds cited Fear of Music as representing the Eno–Talking Heads collaboration "at its most mutually fruitful and equitable". The single "Life During Wartime" produced the catchphrase "This ain't no party, this ain't no disco". The song refers to the Mudd Club and CBGB, two popular New York nightclubs of the time.

"Once in a Lifetime"
The fourth song from Remain in Light used Eno's Oblique Strategies technique and featured Byrne's alienated meditation on life. The song was named one of the 100 most important American musical works of the 20th century by NPR.

Remain in Light (1980) was heavily influenced by Fela Kuti, whose music had been introduced to the band by Eno. It explored West African polyrhythms, weaving these together with music from North Africa, disco, funk, and "found" voices. These combinations foreshadowed Byrne's later interest in world music. To perform these more complex arrangements, the band toured with an expanded group, including guitarist Adrian Belew and keyboardist Bernie Worrell among others, first at the Heatwave festival in August 1980.

During this period, Weymouth and Frantz formed a commercially successful splinter group, Tom Tom Club, influenced by the foundational elements of hip-hop, and Harrison released his first solo album, The Red and the Black. Byrne and Eno released My Life in the Bush of Ghosts, which incorporated world music, found sounds and a number of other prominent international and post-punk musicians.

Remain in Light's lead single, "Once in a Lifetime", became a Top 20 hit in the UK, but initially failed to make an impression in the US. It grew into a popular standard over the next few years on the strength of its music video, which Time named one of the greatest of all time.

=== 1981–1991: Commercial peak and breakup ===
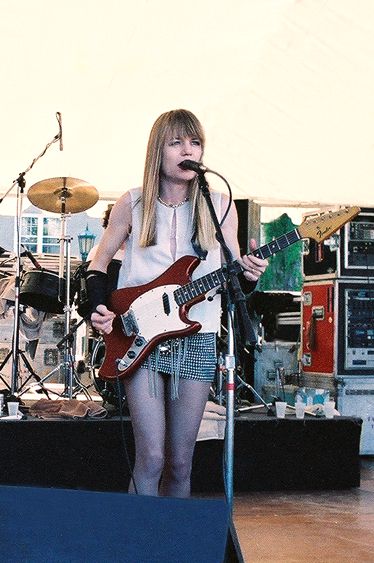
Tina Weymouth (pictured in 1986) and her husband Chris Frantz formed the side project Tom Tom Club.

After releasing four albums in barely four years, the group went on a recording hiatus, and nearly three years passed before their next release, although Frantz and Weymouth continued to record with Tom Tom Club. In the meantime, Talking Heads released the live album The Name of This Band Is Talking Heads, toured the United States and Europe as an eight-piece group, and parted ways with Eno, who went on to produce albums with U2.

Speaking in Tongues (1983), a commercial breakthrough that produced their only American Top 10 hit, "Burning Down the House". The video received heavy airplay on MTV. The tour was documented in Jonathan Demme's concert film Stop Making Sense (1984) and the live album of the same name (1984). The Speaking in Tongues tour was Talking Heads' last.

Little Creatures (1985) featured "And She Was" and "Road to Nowhere". It offered a much more American pop-rock sound than their previous efforts.

True Stories (1986) consists of covers of all the soundtrack songs from Byrne's film. It included the band's last Top 40 hit, "Wild Wild Life", and the accordion-driven track "Radio Head". The music video for "Wild Wild Life" won "Best Group Video" at the MTV Video Music Awards in 1987.

Naked (1988) explored politics, sex, and death, with much African influence of polyrhythmic styles like those seen on Remain in Light. It produced "(Nothing But) Flowers". During that time, the group was falling increasingly under David Byrne's control, and after Naked, they went on "hiatus". In 1987, Talking Heads released Byrne's book What the Songs Look Like: Contemporary Artists Interpret Talking Heads Songs.

In December 1991, Talking Heads announced that they had disbanded. Frantz said he learned that Byrne had left from an article in the Los Angeles Times, and said: "As far as we're concerned, the band never really broke up. David just decided to leave." Their final release was "Sax and Violins", an original song that had appeared earlier that year on the soundtrack to Wim Wenders's Until the end of the World. Byrne continued his solo career, releasing Rei Momo in 1989 and The Forest in 1991. This period also saw a revived flourish from Tom Tom Club (Boom Boom Chi Boom Boom and Dark Sneak Love Action) and Harrison (Casual Gods and Walk on Water), who toured together in 1990.

=== 1992–present: Post-breakup and reunions ===
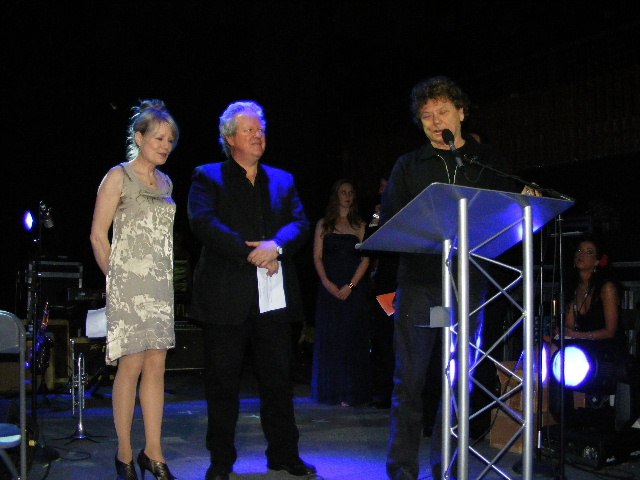
Weymouth, Frantz, and Harrison at SXSW in 2010

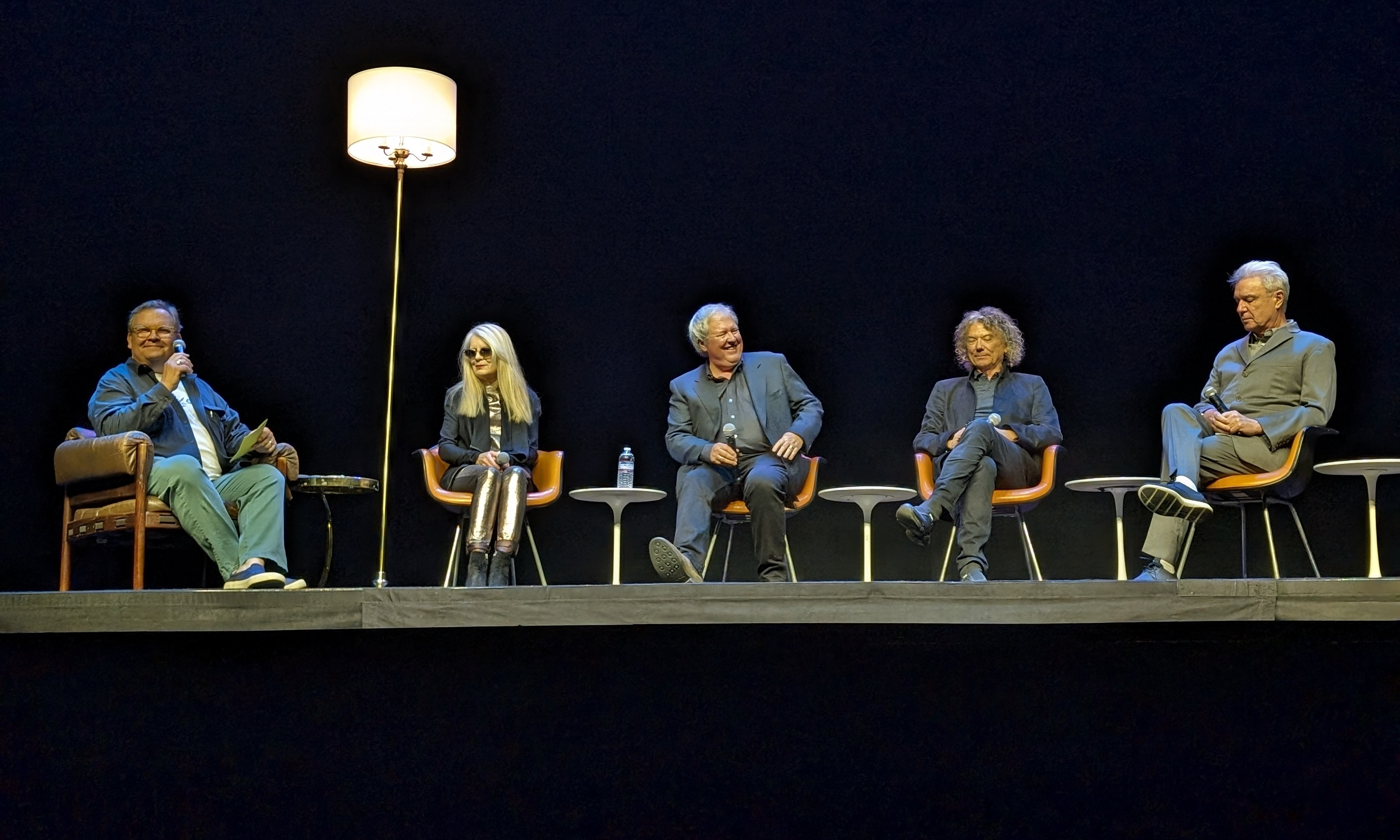
Talking Heads with Andy Richter (seated to the left), Pantages Theater, June 2024

Harrison produced records such as the Violent Femmes' The Blind Leading the Naked; the Fine Young Cannibals' The Raw and the Cooked; General Public's Rub It Better; Crash Test Dummies' God Shuffled His Feet; Live's Mental Jewelry, Throwing Copper, and The Distance to Here; and No Doubt's song "New" from Return of Saturn. Frantz and Weymouth have produced for several artists, including Happy Mondays and Ziggy Marley. Tom Tom Club continues to record and tour intermittently.

Weymouth, Frantz, and Harrison toured without Byrne as Shrunken Heads in the early 1990s. In 1996, they released an album, No Talking, Just Head, under the name the Heads. The album featured a number of vocalists, including Gavin Friday of the Virgin Prunes, Debbie Harry of Blondie, Johnette Napolitano of Concrete Blonde, Andy Partridge of XTC, Gordon Gano of Violent Femmes, Michael Hutchence of INXS, Ed Kowalczyk of Live, Shaun Ryder of Happy Mondays, Richard Hell, and Maria McKee. It was accompanied by a tour with Napolitano as the vocalist. Byrne took legal action to prevent the band using the name the Heads, which he saw as "a pretty obvious attempt to cash in on the Talking Heads name". The band briefly reunited in 1999 to promote the 15th anniversary re-release of Stop Making Sense, but did not perform together.

Talking Heads reunited to play "Life During Wartime", "Psycho Killer", and "Burning Down the House" on March 18, 2002, at the ceremony of their induction into the Rock and Roll Hall of Fame, joined onstage by former touring members Bernie Worrell and Steve Scales. Byrne said further work together was unlikely, due to "bad blood" and being musically "miles apart". Weymouth has been critical of Byrne, describing him as "a man incapable of returning friendship" and saying that he did not "love" her, Frantz, and Harrison. In 2020, Frantz published a memoir about his relationship with Weymouth, Remain in Love, which covered the band's conflicts.

In September 2023, Stop Making Sense was re-released in IMAX with remastered sound and picture to coincide for its 40th anniversary. The band members reunited that month for a Q&A at the Toronto International Film Festival, following limited showings of the film in theaters, and gave interviews together to promote the re-release. Byrne said that the band members had become more comfortable with one another, but that he did not want to make new music or tour with Talking Heads. He said: "Musically, I've gone to a very different place... It's pretty much impossible to recapture where you were at that time in your life." In January 2024, Billboard reported that Talking Heads had turned down $80 million for a reunion tour, which would have included a performance at Coachella.

In 2023 and 2025, Harrison and Belew toured with a band performing Remain in Light songs. On June 5, 2025, their 50th anniversary, Talking Heads released a music video for "Psycho Killer" directed by Mike Mills and starring Saoirse Ronan. In 2026 it was announced that the band would publish a book, Talking Heads: New Feeling, in 2027 to mark the 50th anniversary of the release of their debut album, and which would include handwritten lyrics, original album sketches, and private photos from the band members' private archives.

== Style ==
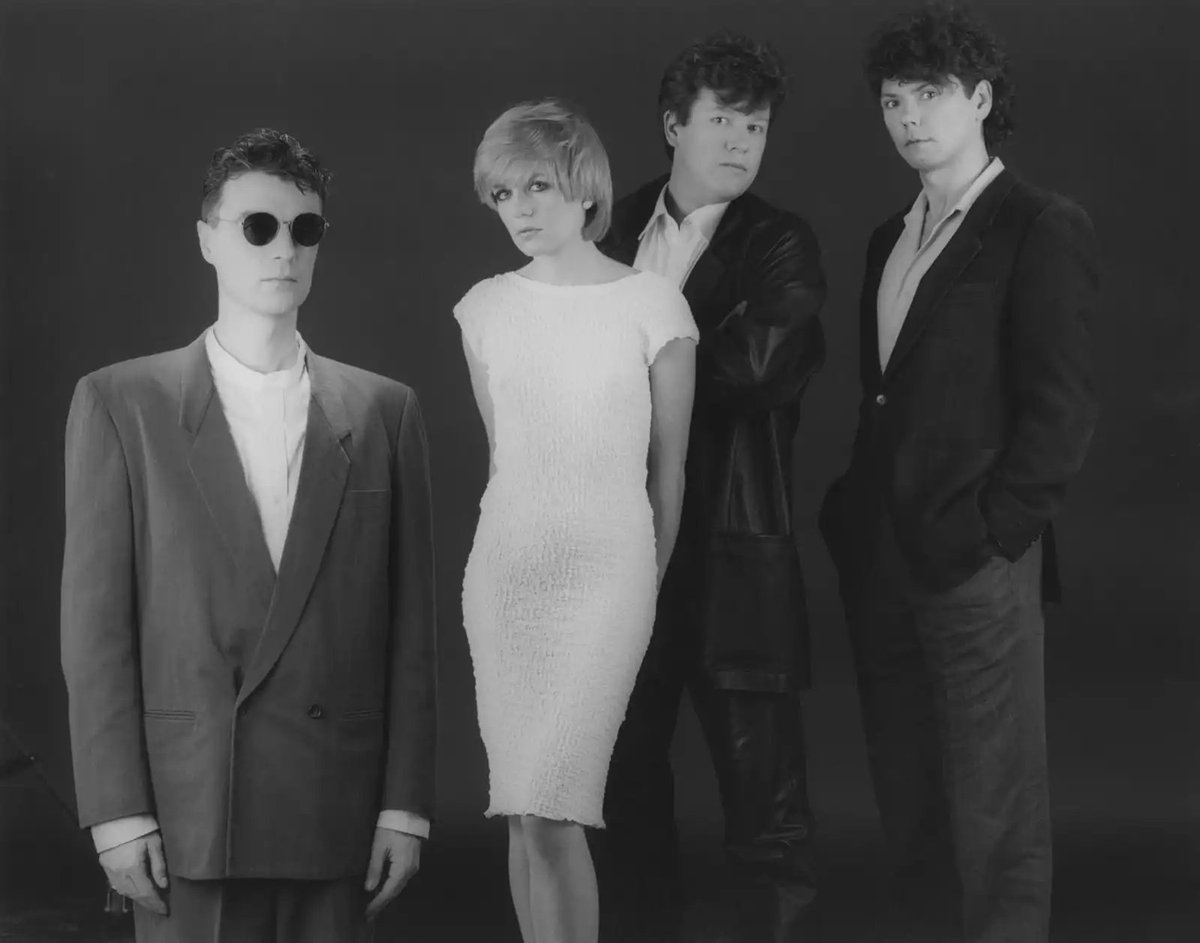
Talking Heads in a 1985 publicity photo for Sire Records

I try to write about small things. Paper, animals, a house… love is kind of big. I have written a love song, though. In this film, I sing it to a lamp.

— David Byrne, interviewing himself in Stop Making Sense

Contemporary accounts described Talking Heads as one of the "principle exponents of cerebral new wave music", a punk rock band "capable of fresh innovation", the "current reigning lords of punk rock" and "a transitional phase in the development of Punk Rock". Retrospectively, AllMusic wrote that Talking Heads started out as "art-school punks", but evolved into one of the most celebrated bands of the post-punk era, and "had recorded everything from art-funk to polyrhythmic worldbeat explorations and simple, melodic guitar pop," by the time of their breakup. Andy Cush of Pitchfork also described them as "New York art-punks" whose "blend of nervy postmodernism and undeniable groove made them one of the defining rock bands of the late 1970s and '80s." Em Casalena of American Songwriter said that Talking Heads were "one of the most beloved avant-funk and post-punk outfits". Media theorist Dick Hebdige said they "draw eclectically on a wide range of visual and aural sources to create a distinctive pastiche or hybrid 'house style' which they have used since their formation in the mid-1970s deliberately to stretch received (industrial) definitions of what rock/pop/video/Art/ performance/audience are," calling them "a properly postmodernist band".

While originating in the New York punk scene, Talking Heads rose to prominence for their art pop innovations, which had a long-lasting impact on music. David Byrne's "manic yelp" combined with "tight R&B grooves" helped the band define the new wave genre in the United States, alongside Devo, Ramones, and Blondie. PopMatters labeled the band a "dance-rock outfit" who most in the punk subculture will have trouble getting into, due to their "outward antisocial stance." Talking Heads also embraced funk rock and experimental pop as their career progressed, while their more cosmopolitan hits like 1980's Remain in Light helped bring African rock to the Western world in the form of Afrobeat.

== Legacy ==
Talking Heads have been cited as an influence by artists including OMD, Nelly Furtado, Eddie Vedder, LCD Soundsystem, Foals, the Weeknd, Primus, Bell X1, the 1975, Kesha, St. Vincent, Danny Brown, Trent Reznor, Radio 4, Josef K, and Franz Ferdinand frontman Alex Kapranos. Radiohead took their name from the 1986 Talking Heads song "Radio Head", and cited Remain in Light as a critical influence on their 2000 album Kid A. Italian filmmaker and director Paolo Sorrentino, receiving the Oscar for the La Grande Bellezza in 2014, thanked Talking Heads, among others, as a source of inspiration.

Rolling Stone included them on their "100 Greatest Artists of All Time". David Sitek wrote in appreciation:

The first song I really liked was 'Once in a Lifetime.' MTV had just started to sink its claws into people, and that song was like an anthem for coked-up adults trying to make sense of their world. Remain in Light was this combination of ambient music and strong lyrics and incredibly inventive percussion and bass parts. I was a kid, but I still thought, 'I should have been involved in that record!' ... They weren't always complex, either — there's some stuff where it's just bare-bones essentials. ' This Must Be the Place' is probably one of the most important songs in my entire life. I find the lyrics really calming. The song is simple, but when you look at all the elements and how they're put together and where the downbeat is, it's kind of … clever is not even really the word. Genius, maybe?

== Members ==
- David Byrne – lead vocals, guitar, keyboards, percussion (1975–1991, 2002)
- Chris Frantz – drums, percussion, backing vocals (1975–1991, 2002)
- Tina Weymouth – bass guitar, keyboards, backing vocals (1975–1991, 2002)
- Jerry Harrison – keyboards, guitar, backing vocals (1977–1991, 2002)

=== Additional musicians ===
- Adrian Belew – guitar, vocals (1980–1981)
- Alex Weir – guitar, vocals (1982–1984)
- Bernie Worrell – keyboards, backing vocals (1980–1984, 2002; died 2016)
- Raymond Jones – keyboards (1982)
- Busta Jones – bass (1980–1981; died 1995)
- Steve Scales – percussion, backing vocals (1980–1984, 2002)
- Dolette McDonald – vocals, cowbell (1980–1982)
- Nona Hendryx – vocals (1980, 1982)
- Ednah Holt – vocals (1983)
- Lynn Mabry – vocals (1983–1984)
- Stephanie Spruill – vocals (1984)

== Discography ==
- Talking Heads: 77 (1977)
- More Songs About Buildings and Food (1978)
- Fear of Music (1979)
- Remain in Light (1980)
- Speaking in Tongues (1983)
- Little Creatures (1985)
- True Stories (1986)
- Naked (1988)

== Awards and nominations ==
Award	Year	Nominee(s)	Category	Result	Ref.
Clio Awards	2026	"Fa Fa Fa"	Experience/Activation - Guerrilla	Silver	
Clio Awards	2026	"Fa Fa Fa"	Integrated Campaign - Other	Bronze	
Clio Awards	2026	"Fa Fa Fa"	Music Marketing Innovation	Nominated	
Clio Awards	2026	"Psycho Killer"	Music Video	Bronze	
Grammy Awards	1984	"Burning Down the House"	Best Rock Performance by a Duo or Group with Vocal	Nominated	
Grammy Awards	1988	Storytelling Giant	Best Concept Music Video	Nominated	
MTV Video Music Awards	1984	"Burning Down the House"	Best Special Effects	Nominated	
MTV Video Music Awards	1985	"Once in a Lifetime"	Best Stage Performance	Nominated	
MTV Video Music Awards	1985	David Byrne	Video Vanguard Award	Won	
MTV Video Music Awards	1986	"Road to Nowhere"	Video of the Year	Nominated	
MTV Video Music Awards	1986	"Road to Nowhere"	Best Concept Video	Nominated	
MTV Video Music Awards	1986	"Road to Nowhere"	Viewer's Choice	Nominated	
MTV Video Music Awards	1986	"And She Was"	Best Group Video	Nominated	
MTV Video Music Awards	1986	"And She Was"	Best Concept Video	Nominated	
MTV Video Music Awards	1987	"Wild Wild Life"	Best Group Video	Won	
MTV Video Music Awards	1987	"Wild Wild Life"	Best Video from a Film	Won	
MTV Video Music Awards	1987	"Wild Wild Life"	Best Concept Video	Nominated	
UK Music Video Awards	2025	"Psycho Killer"	Best Rock Video – International	Nominated	
UK Music Video Awards	2025	"Psycho Killer"	Best Performance in a Video	Nominated	

== See also ==
- List of dance-rock artists
- List of funk rock and funk metal bands
- List of new wave artists
- List of post-punk bands
