= List of first women lawyers and judges in North America =

This is a list of the first women lawyer(s) and judge(s) in North America (a separate list is devoted to the United States). It includes the year in which the women were admitted to practice law (in parentheses). Also included are the first women in their country to achieve a certain distinction such as graduating from law school.

KEY

- DNK = Constituent country of Denmark
- FRA = Administrative division of France
- GBR = British overseas territory of the United Kingdom
- NLD = Constituent country of the Netherlands
- USA = Associate state or territory of the United States of America

== Anguilla ==
See Women in law in the United Kingdom

== Antigua and Barbuda ==
- Florence Lake (1960): First female lawyer in Antigua and Barbuda
- Monica Theresa Joseph: First female appointed as a Justice of the Eastern Caribbean Supreme Court (1982)
- Bernice Lake (1969): First female to become a Queen's Counsel (QC) in the Eastern Caribbean (Antigua; 1987)
- E. Ann Henry: First female to serve as the President of the Antigua and Barbuda Bar Association (c. 1996)
- Gertel Thom (1982): First female to become Attorney-General of Antigua and Barbuda (1998-2001)
- Charmaine Pemberton: First (female) Master of the Eastern Caribbean Supreme Court (2000)
- Nicole Sylvester: First female to serve as the President of the Organization of Eastern Caribbean States (OECS) Bar Association (c. 2007)
- Ola Mae Edwards, Janice Pereira (née George–Creque), and Indra Hariprashad-Charles: First female Court of Appeal Coram in Antigua and Barbuda (2008)
- Janice Pereira (British Virgin Islands, 1981): First female (and British Virgin Islander) justice appointed as the Chief Justice of the Eastern Caribbean Supreme Court (2012)
- Nicola Petra Byer: First (female) Presiding Judge of the Eastern Caribbean Supreme Court’s Family Division (High Court of Antigua and Barbuda, 2022)

== Aruba (NLD) ==
- Dorothée de Sampayo: First female Magistrate of the Court of Justice of the Netherlands Antilles (1982-1986). She later became the first female Registrar of the International Criminal Tribunal for the former Yugoslavia. [Aruba]
- Carla Bakhuis-Vinck: First female appointed as a Judge of the Court of Justice of the Netherlands Antilles (1987)
- Theresa Croes-Fernandes Pedra: First Aruban (female) to serve as a Judge of the Common Court of Justice of the Netherlands Antilles and Aruba (1995)
- Helen Lejuez: First female prosecutor in Aruba, as well as the first female to serve as the Acting Attorney General of Aruba
- Lisbeth Hoefdraad: First female appointed as the President of the Common Court of Justice of the Antilles and Aruba (2007-2013) [now called the Joint Court of Justice of Aruba, Curaçao, Sint Maarten, and of Bonaire, Sint Eustatius and Saba]
- Gisèle Veen-Jonkhout: First female Public Prosecutor of the Netherlands Antilles (2010)
- Monica Kock: First female elected as the Dean of the Aruban Bar Association
- Jurima Bryson: First (female) Ombudsman for Aruba (2024)
- Jane Jansen: First Aruban female to serve as the Vice-President of the Court of First Instance of Aruba (2025)

== Bahamas ==
- Patricia Cole Cozzi (1953): First female lawyer in The Bahamas
- Stephanie Unwala: First female magistrate in The Bahamas (1977)
- Janet Bostwick (1971): First female lawyer to become the Attorney General of The Bahamas (1995-2001). She was also the first female to serve as the President of The Bahamas Bar Association (1980).
- Joan Sawyer (1973): First female judge in The Bahamas (upon her appointment to the Supreme Court of the Bahamas in 1988). She was also the first female justice appointed as the Chief Justice of The Bahamas (1996-2001) and the President of the Court of Appeal of the Bahamas (2001-2010).
- Allyson Maynard Gibson: First female Queen's Counsel (QC) in The Bahamas (2015)
- Marisa Mason-Smith: First (female) Ombudsman for The Bahamas (2019)
- Cordell Frazier: First female to serve as the Director of Public Prosecutions in The Bahamas (2024)

== Barbados ==
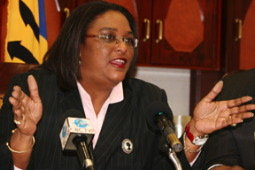
Mia Mottley: First female Attorney General of Barbados (2001)

- Marie Elizabeth Bourne-Hollands (1947): First female to practice law in Barbados
- Norma E. Maynard-Marshall (1962): First female solicitor in Barbados
- Billie Miller (1969): First female barrister in Barbados
- Sandra Mason (1975): First Barbadian woman admitted to the Barbados Bar Association. In 1978, she became the first female appointed as a magistrate in Barbados. She was the first female appointed as a Judge of the Court of Appeal (Supreme Court of Judicature; 2008), as well as the first female magistrate appointed as an Ambassador from Barbados.
- Shirley Bell (1972): First female to serve as a Chief Magistrate in Barbados (1991)
- Marie McCormack (1971): First female judge (1992) and Judge of the High Court (1995) in Barbados
- Beverley Walrond (1974): First female to serve as the President of the Barbados Bar Association
- Kaye Goodridge: First female to serve as the Solicitor General of Barbados (1996)
- Mia Mottley (1986): First female appointed as the Attorney General of Barbados (2001)
- Donna Babb-Agard: First female appointed as deputy director of Public Prosecutions in Barbados (2005)

== Belize ==
- Hadie Goldson: First female lawyer in Belize
- Zoila Ellis-Browne: First Garifuna female lawyer in Belize
- Marie Henry Anderson: First (female) magistrate of the Belize Family Court (1990)
- Michelle Arana: First female judge in Belize (upon becoming a Judge of the Supreme Court of Belize in 2006)
- Margaret Gabb-McKenzie: First female to serve as the Chief Magistrate of Belize (2007)
- Monica Coc Magnusson: First indigenous (Qʼeqchiʼ) female from southern Belize called to the Belize Bar Association
- Vanessa Retreage: First female appointed as the Attorney General of Belize (2015)
- Lisa Shoman (1988): First female appointed as a Judge of the Inter-American Development Bank's Tribunal (2017). She was also the first female to serve as the President of the Bar Association of Belize (1996).
- Minnet Hafiz-Bertram: First female to serve as a Judge of the Court of Appeals of Belize (2013) and its Acting Chief Justice (2020)
- Louise Blenman: First female to serve as the Chief Justice of the Supreme Court of Belize (2022)

== Bermuda (GBR) ==
See Women in law in the United Kingdom

== Bonaire (NLD) ==
- Dorothée de Sampayo: First female Magistrate of the Court of Justice of the Netherlands Antilles (1982-1986). She later became the first female Registrar of the International Criminal Tribunal for the former Yugoslavia. [Bonaire]
- Carla Bakhuis-Vinck: First female appointed as a Judge of the Court of Justice of the Netherlands Antilles (1987)
- Lisbeth Hoefdraad: First female appointed as the President of the Common Court of Justice of the Antilles and Aruba (2007-2013) [now called the Joint Court of Justice of Aruba, Curaçao, Sint Maarten, and of Bonaire, Sint Eustatius and Saba]
- Marga Domingo-Van Lieshout (2006): First female registered to practice law in the Order of Lawyers Bonaire (Orde van Advocaten van Bonaire; founded in 2004)
- Anneke van Toll: First female to serve as Dean of the Order of Lawyers Bonaire (Orde van Advocaten van Bonaire; 2009)
- Gisèle Veen-Jonkhout: First female Public Prosecutor of the Netherlands Antilles (2010)
- Marian Veneberg: First female to serve as the Chief Prosecutor of the BES islands (Bonaire, Saba, and Sint Eustatius) (2021)
- Eline Groenendaal: First (female) criminal judge in Bonaire (2023)

== British Virgin Islands (GBR) ==
See Women in law in the United Kingdom

== Canada ==
See Women in law in Canada

== Cayman Islands (GBR) ==
See Women in law in the United Kingdom

== Costa Rica ==
- Ángela Acuña Braun (c. 1925): First female lawyer in Costa Rica
- Virginia Martén Pagés: First female lawyer to obtain the title of notary public in Costa Rica (1947)
- Ofelia Vincenzi Peñaranda: First female to serve as a juvenile public defender in Costa Rica
- María Eugenia Vargas Solera: First female judge in Costa Rica (upon her appointment as a Judge of the Juvenile Protection of Costa Rica in 1956)
- Marcelina Zeledón: First female mayoral judge in Costa Rica (1968)
- Ana María Breedy Jalet: First female to serve as an Alternate Magistrate of the Supreme Court of Justice of Costa Rica (1975), as well as the first female to preside over the Full Court
- Dora María Guzmán Zanetti: First female to serve as a Magistrate of the Supreme Court of Justice of Costa Rica (1984)
- Sonia Picado Sotela: First (Costa Rican) female to serve as a Judge of the Inter-American Court of Human Rights (1989)
- Ana Virginia Calzada-Miranda: First female to serve as a magistrate of the Constitutional Chamber of the Supreme Court of Justice of Costa Rica (1993) and its President (2008)
- Maruja Chacón Pacheco: First female magistrate of the Supreme Electoral Court of Costa Rica (1997)
- Anabelle León Feoli: First female justice appointed to the Presidency of the First Chamber of the Supreme Court of Justice of Costa Rica (2003)
- Elizabeth Odio Benito: First Costa Rican female to serve as a Judge of the International Criminal Court (2003)
- Éricka Hernández Sandoval: First female to serve as the President of the Costa Rican Bar Association (2009)
- Zarela Villanueva Monge (c. 1970s): First female Vice President (2010) and President of the Supreme Court of Justice of Costa Rica (2013)
- Doris Arias Madrigal: First female justice appointed to the Presidency of the Criminal Chamber of the Supreme Court of Justice of Costa Rica (2017)
- Emilia Navas: First female appointed as the Attorney General of Costa Rica (2018)

== Cuba ==
- Francisca Rojas de Astudillo: First female law graduate in Cuba (1886)
- Esperanza de Quesada Villalón (c. 1913): First female lawyer in Cuba
- Ofelia Domínguez Navarro: First female notary in Cuba (1922)
- Maria T. Ruiz y Rojas: First female judge in Cuba (c. 1926)
- Ángela Mariana Zaldívar Peyrellade: First female prosecutor in Cuba (1926)
- Rosa Anders: First female appointed as a Public Defender in Cuba
- Sara Esther Fernández Concepción and Maria del Carmen Herrero Rodriguez: First females to serve as Judges of the People's Supreme Court of Cuba (1973)
- Zenaida Osorio Vizcaino: First female to serve as the Vice President of the People's Supreme Court of Cuba (c. 1998)
- Marlén Fernández Machado: First female to serve as the Deputy Attorney General of Cuba (2012)
- Yamila Peña Ojeda: First female to serve as the Attorney General of Cuba (2018)
- Lilia María Hernández Doejó: First female to serve as President of Cuba's National Organization of Collective Law Firms (2021)

== Curaçao (NLD) ==
- Viola Antonia Geevers-Hollander (1946): First female lawyer in Curaçao
- Carla Bakhuis-Vinck: First Antillean female (Curaçao) appointed as a Judge of the Court of Justice of the Netherlands Antilles (1987)
- Adèle Pauline van der Pluijm-Vrede: First female to act as a civil-law notary in Curaçao (1994). She was also the first female President of Curaçao's Antillean Lawyers Association.
- Lisbeth Hoefdraad: First female appointed as the President of the Common Court of Justice of the Antilles and Aruba (2007-2013) [now called the Joint Court of Justice of Aruba, Curaçao, Sint Maarten, and of Bonaire, Sint Eustatius and Saba]
- Alba Maria-Teresa Martijn: First female to serve as Ombudsman for Curaçao (2009)
- Gisèle Veen-Jonkhout: First female to serve as a prosecutor for the Public Prosecution Service of Curaçao (2010)
- Caroline Fiévez: First female to serve as the Dean of the Order of Lawyers Curaçao (Orde van Advocaten van Curaçao; 2012)

== Dominica ==
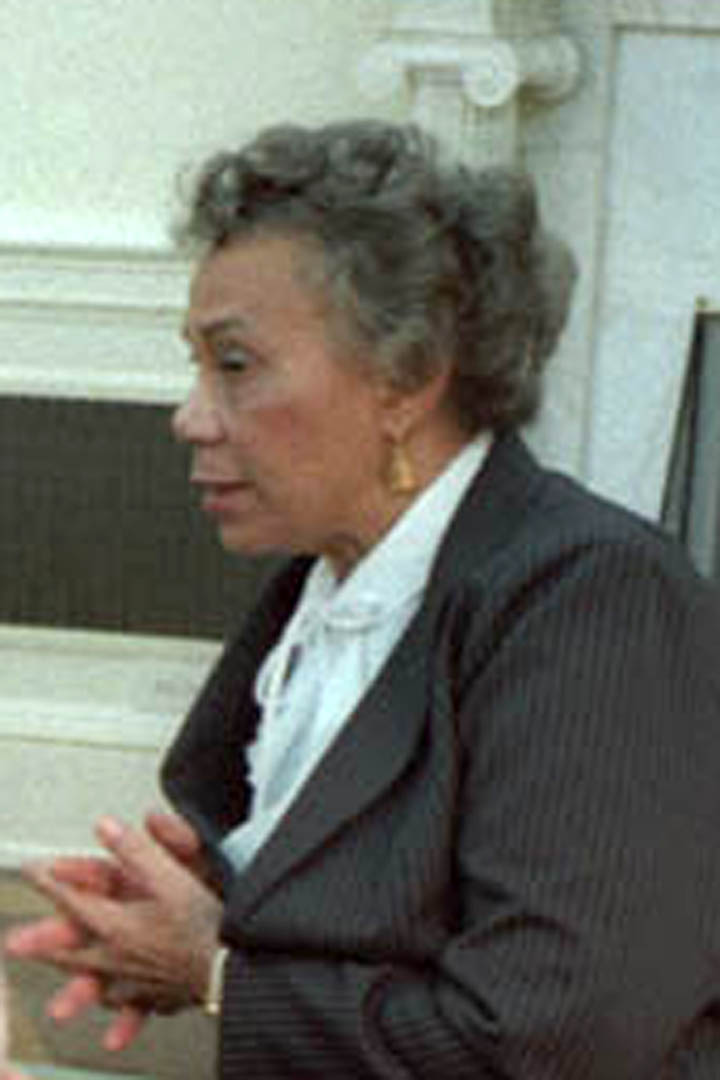
Eugenia Charles: First female lawyer in Dominica (1949)

- Mary Eugenia Charles (1949): First female lawyer in Dominica. She later served as the President of the Dominica Bar Association during the 1970s, and may have been the first female to do so.
- Sylvia Judith Bertrand (1969): First female to serve as the Solicitor General of Dominica (1982)
- Monica Theresa Joseph: First female judge in Dominica (upon her appointment as a Justice of the Eastern Caribbean Supreme Court in 1982)
- Charmaine Pemberton: First (female) Master of the Eastern Caribbean Supreme Court (2000)
- Francine Baron Royer: First female to serve as the Attorney General of Dominica (2007)
- Nicole Sylvester: First female to serve as the President of the Organization of Eastern Caribbean States (OECS) Bar Association (c. 2007)
- Janice Pereira (British Virgin Islands, 1981): First female (and British Virgin Islander) justice appointed as the Chief Justice of the Eastern Caribbean Supreme Court (2012)
- Evelina Elenora-Merquin Baptiste: First female to serve as the Director of Public Prosecutions of Dominica (2013)
- Pearl Williams: First Kalinago (female) lawyer and indigenous magistrate in Dominica (2016)

== Dominican Republic ==
- Minerva Argentina Mirabal (c. 1940s): First female to graduate with a law degree in the Dominican Republic, but she was denied the right to practice as an attorney
- Ana Teresa Paredas: First female lawyer in the Dominican Republic
- Luisa Comarazamy de Los Santos: First female Justice of the Peace in the Dominican Republic (c. 1950s)
- Altagracia Mélida Frómeta Pereyra: First female judge in the Dominican Republic (upon her appointment as a Judge of the Court of Appeals in 1956)
- Olga Altagracia Seijas Herrero: First female to serve as a Judge of the Electoral Board of the Dominican Republic (1987)
- Pura Luz Núñez Pérez and Semiramis Olivo de Pichardo: First females to serve as the Attorney General of the Dominican Republic (their terms were 1988-1990 respectively)
- Jeannette Alfau Ortiz: First Dominican (female) lawyer in Spain
- Margarita Tavares Vidal (1947): First female appointed as a Justice of the Supreme Court of the Dominican Republic (1997)
- Zoila Martínez (1967): First female appointed as Prosecutor of the National District in the Dominican Republic (1995). In 2013, she became the first (female) Ombudsman of the Dominican Republic.
- Rhadys Abreu de Polanco: First Dominican Republic female elected as a Judge of the Inter-American Court of Human Rights of the Organization of American States (2006)
- Olga Herrera Carbuccia: First Dominican Republic female elected as a Judge of the International Criminal Court (2011)
- Mabel Ybelca Féliz Báez: First female to serve as a Judge of the Superior Electoral Court of the Dominican Republic (2011)
- Ana Isabel Bonilla Hernandez and Katia Miguelina Jiménez Martínez: First females to serve as Judges of the Constitutional Court of the Dominican Republic (2011)
- Pilar Jiménez Ortiz: First female to serve as President of the Supreme Court of the Dominican Republic’s Civil Chambre (c. 2019)
- Nancy Idelsa Salcedo Fernández: First female appointed as a member of the National Council of the Magistracy (CNM) in the Dominican Republic (2020)

== El Salvador ==
- Alma Paredes Delgado: First El Salvadorean female to become a lawyer, though her studies were in Mexico and her other pursuits included journalism
- María García Herrera de Jovel (1944): First female to graduate as a lawyer in El Salvador
- Noemí Arias Avilés: First female appointed as a Judge of the First Instance in El Salvador (1959)
- Yolanda Myers de Vásquez: First female to serve as a Magistrate of the Labor Chamber (1961) and the Attorney General of El Salvador (1967)
- Ana "Anita" Calderón de Buitrago and Aronette Diaz: First females to serve as Judges of the Supreme Court of Justice of El Salvador (1994)
- Miriam Geraldine Aldana Revelo: First (female) Judge of the Courts of Extinction of Domain (2004)
- Carmen Elena Rivas Landaverde: First female to serve as the President of the Court of Accounts of the Republic of El Salvador (c. 2018)
- Dora Esmeralda Martínez de Barahona: First female to serve as the President of the Supreme Electoral Tribunal of El Salvador (2019)

== Greenland (DNK) ==
- Agnete Weis Bentzon: First female lawyer to perform a legal expedition in Greenland (the result of which led to the creation of a criminal law system in Greenland). She served as a judge in Greenland from 1963 to 1964. Prior to the expedition, she had the distinction of being Denmark's first female professor of law.
- Vera Leth: First Greenlandic female lawyer (1988). She is also the female to serve as the County Council Ombudsman for the Parliament of Greenland (1997).
- Birgit Skriver: First female to serve as a Judge of the Court of Greenland (2011; court created in 2010)
- Britta Keldsen: First female to serve as the Chairperson of the Law Society of Greenland (Nunatsinni Advokatit: Grønlandske Advokater, 2019)

== Grenada ==
- Monica Theresa Joseph: First female judge in Grenada (upon her appointment as a Justice of the Eastern Caribbean Supreme Court in 1982)
- Velma L. Hylton (1967): First female to serve as the Director of Public Prosecutions in Grenada (1984)
- Charmaine Pemberton: First (female) Master of the Eastern Caribbean Supreme Court (2000). She later became the first female resident judge in Grenada in 2003.
- Nicole Sylvester: First female to serve as the President of the Organization of Eastern Caribbean States (OECS) Bar Association (c. 2007)
- Celia Edwards: First female lawyer to become a Queen's Counsel (QC) in Grenada (2008)
- Janice Pereira (British Virgin Islands, 1981): First female (and British Virgin Islander) justice appointed as the Chief Justice of the Eastern Caribbean Supreme Court (2012)
- Dia Forrester: First female to serve as the Attorney General of Grenada (2021)
- Rosalyn E. Wilkinson: First female to serve as Chairperson of the General Legal Council of Grenada (2021)

== Guadeloupe (FRA) ==
- Gerty Archimede (1939): First female lawyer in Guadeloupe and the rest of the French West Indies (Martinique, Saint Barthélemy and Saint Martin). She was also the first female to serve as President of the Bar of Guadeloupe (1967). She was also considered the first Black (female) lawyer in France.
- Christine Penichon: First female to serve as the Attorney General at the Court of Appeal of Basse-Terre in Guadeloupe (2008)
- Sylvie Favier: First female to serve as the President of the Administrative Courts of Basse-Terre, Saint Barthélemy and Saint Martin (2010)
- Élodie Rouchouse: First female to serve as the Advocate General at the Court of Appeal of Basse-Terre in Guadeloupe (2020)
- Vanessa Bousardo: First West Indian and Guadeloupean (female) lawyer elected as the Vice-President of the Paris Bar Council in France (2023)
- Caroline Gaussen-Calbo: First female to serve as the Public Prosecutor of Guadeloupe’s Pointe-à-Pitre Judicial Court (2023)

== Guatemala ==
- Luz Castillo Díaz-Ordaz de Villagrán: First female to graduate as a lawyer in Guatemala (1927), though she could not exercise the profession until the 1940s
- Graciela Quan (1942): First female lawyer in Guatemala
- Eunice Lima Schaul (c. 1953): First female called to the Guatemalan Bar Association
- Ana Maria Rosa Vargas de Ortiz: First female judge in Guatemala (1960)
- María Luisa Beltranena de Padilla: First female to serve as a Magistrate and the President of the Supreme Court of Justice of Guatemala and the Judicial Branch (during Jorge Serrano Elías' coup in 1993)
- Alma Beatriz Quiñones López: First female to serve as the President of the Constitutional Court of Guatemala (1995)
- Zoila Alicia Villela Villalobos: First female to serve as Magistrate of the Supreme Electoral Tribunal (Guatemala) (2002)
- Beatriz Ofelia de León: First female democratically elected as the President of the Supreme Court of Justice of Guatemala (2005)
- Yolanda Pérez Ruiz: First female to serve as the President of the College of Lawyers and Notaries of Guatemala (2005)
- María Eugenia Villagrán de León: First female to serve as President of the Supreme Electoral Tribunal (Guatemala) (2008)
- María Encarnación Mejía García de Contreras: First female to serve as the interim Attorney General of Guatemala (2010)
- Claudia Paz y Paz: First female to permanently serve as the Attorney General of Guatemala (2010-2014)
- María Magdalena Jocholá Tujal: First indigenous female (Kaqchikel Maya people) to serve as an Alternate Magistrate of the Constitutional Court of Guatemala (2026)

== Haiti ==
- Georgette Justin (1933): First female lawyer in Haiti
- Ertha Pascal-Trouillot (1971): First female lawyer registered with a bar council in Haiti. She was also the first female judge in Haiti (upon her appointment as a Judge of the Court of First Instance in 1979). She was too the first female appointed as a Judge of the Court of Appeal (1985) and the Supreme Court of Haiti (Court of Cassation; 1986). From 1990-1991, she was the first female to serve as the Provisional Chief Justice of the Supreme Court of Haiti.
- Nonie H. Mathieu: First female to serve as the President of the Superior Court of Auditors and Administrative Disputes of Haiti (2009)
- Florence Elie: First female to serve as the Protector of the Citizen (Ombudsman) for Haiti (2009)
- Dilia Lemaire: First female lawyer appointed to the appointed to the Superior Council of the Judicial Power (CSPJ) (2012)
- Marie Suzy Legros (1989): First female elected to serve as a Bâtonnière (l’ordre des avocats de Port-au-Prince) in Haiti (2020)
- Youdeline Chérizard Joseph (1999): First female to serve as the Deputy Secretary General of the Board of Directors of the Haitian Bar Federation (FBH) (2025)

== Honduras ==
- Alba Alonso de Quesada: First female lawyer in Honduras
- Georgina Bustillo-Rivera: First female to become a Judge of Letters in Honduras (1957)
- Edna Carolina Echeverría Haylock: First Miskito female lawyer in Honduras
- Edith Rivera de López Castro (1969): First female to serve as a Judge of the Supreme Court of Justice of Honduras (1983-1986)
- Vilma Cecilia Morales Montalván: First female judge to serve as the President of the Supreme Court of Justice of Honduras (2002-2009)
- Anny Belinda Ochoa: First female to serve as the President of the Honduran Bar Association (2018)

== Jamaica ==
- Lily Tai Ten Quee (1934): First female Chinese barrister in Jamaica
- Daisy Lucille Chambers (1948): First female lawyer in Jamaica
- Ena Joyce Collymore-Woodstock (1947; Bar's Gray Inn, England): First female judge in Jamaica (upon her appointment as the Resident Magistrate in 1959). She was also the first female appointed as the Clerk of the Courts (1950).
- Shirley Miller: First female Queen's Counsel (QC) in Jamaica (1971)
- Ena Blanche Allen (1953): First female in Jamaica appointed as a Puisne Justice for the Supreme Court (1975)
- Marjory "Madge" Morgan (1961): First female Judge of the Court of Appeal in Jamaica (1988)
- Paula Llewellyn: First female to serve as the Director of Public Prosecutions (1999) and Senior Deputy Director of Public Prosecutions (2003) in Jamaica
- Hilary Phillips: First female to serve as the President of the Jamaican Bar Association (2001)
- Zaila McCalla (1976): First female justice appointed as the Chief Justice of Jamaica (2007)
- Margarette May Macaulay: First Jamaican female to serve as a Judge of the Inter-American Court of Human Rights (2007)
- Dorothy Lightbourne: First female appointed as the Attorney General of Jamaica (2007-2011)
- Nicole Foster-Pusey (1993): First female appointed as the Solicitor-General of Jamaica (2012)
- Donna Parchment Brown: First female to serve as the Ombudsman for Jamaica (2015)
- Arlene Harrison Henry (1978): First female appointed as the Public Defender of Jamaica (2015)
- Judith Pusey: First female to serve as the Chief Judge of the Parish Court of Jamaica (2016)
- Kathy Ann Brown: First Jamaican and Black female to serve as a Judge of the International Tribunal for the Law of the Sea (2020)
- Denise E. Kitson: First female to serve as the Chairperson of the General Council of Jamaica (2022)
- Chantal Ononaiwu: First Jamaican female to serve as a Judge of the Caribbean Court of Justice (2024)
- Marva McDonald Bishop: First female to serve as the President of the Jamaica Court of Appeal (2024)

== Martinique (FRA) ==
- Gerty Archimede (1939): First female lawyer in the French West Indies (Guadeloupe, Martinique, Saint Barthélemy and Saint Martin)
- Andrée Pierre-Rose Bocaly (1945): First female lawyer to actually practice in Martinique
- Thérèse Yoyo-Likao: First female elected as the Bâtonnière du Barreau de la Martinique (1979)
- Dolor Emmanuel Émile: First female judge in Martinique
- Mme. Roger: First female to serve as a children's judge in Martinique
- Clarisse Taron: First female to serve as a public prosecutor in Martinique (2021)
- Hélène Rouland-Boyer: First female to serve as the President of the Administrative Courts of Martinique and Saint Pierre and Miquelon (2022)
- Murielle Renar-Legrand: First (Martinican) female to serve as the President of the International Conference of Bars (2024)

== Mexico ==
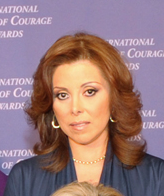
Marisela Morales: First female Attorney General of Mexico (2011)

- María Asunción Sandoval de Zarco (1898): First female to earn a law degree and become a lawyer in Mexico
- Guadalupe Zuñiga de González: First female appointed as a Judge of the Juvenile Court in Mexico (1926)
- Esperanza Velázquez Bringas: First female magistrate of the Superior Court of Justice of the Federal District of Mexico (1929)
- Remedios Albertina Ezeta Uribe (1933): First female judge (civil and criminal) in Mexico (c. 1940s)
- María Lavalle Urbina (1944): First female appointed as a Judge of the Superior Court of the District and Federal Territories (1947). She later became the first female President of the Senate of Mexico.
- Dolores Hedúan Virués: First female appointed as a Magistrate of the Tax Court of the Federation (1947)
- María Cristina Salmorán de Tamayo: First female appointed as the Minister (Judge) of the Supreme Court of Justice of the Nation of Mexico (1961)
- Antonia Jiménez Trava: First female to serve as the President of a Superior Court of Justice in Mexico (1971-1976)
- Luz María Perdomo Juvera: First female appointed as a federal judge (1974)
- Berta Alfonsina Navarro: First female district court judge in Mexico (1977)
- María del Carmen Alanís Figueroa: First female to serve as President of the Electoral Tribunal of the Federation of Mexico (2007)
- Marisela Morales: First female appointed as the Attorney General of Mexico (2011)
- Claudia Elena de Buen Unna: First female to serve as the vice-president (2019) and President (2021) of the Mexican Bar Association, B.C. (Barra Mexicana, Colegio De Abogados, A.C.)
- Socorro Flores Liera: First Mexican (female) to serve as a Judge of the International Criminal Court (2021)
- Josefina Isabel Villalobos (2022): First Rarámuri female lawyer in Mexico
- Norma Lucía Piña Hernández: First female to serve as the Chief Justice of the Supreme Court of Justice of the Nation of Mexico (2023)
- Ana Victoria Espino: First female lawyer with Down syndrome in Mexico (2024)

== Nicaragua ==
- Olga Núñez de Saballos (née Abaunza) (1945): First female lawyer in Nicaragua. She was also the first female to earn a law degree in Nicaragua.
- Catalina Rojas and Joaquina Vega: First female judges in Nicaragua (1948-1949). Vega would later become the first female district court judge in Nicaragua (c. 1964).
- Vilma Núñez de Escorcia: First female to serve as a Judge and Vice-President of the Supreme Court of Nicaragua (1979)
- Anexa Brendale Alfred Cunningham: First indigenous lawyer from Nicaragua (Miskito female) to work for the Inter-American Commission on Human Rights (IACHR) executive secretariat (c. 2001)
- Ana Julia Guido Ochoa: First female appointed as the Attorney General of Nicaragua (2014)
- Doña Alba Luz Ramos: First female judge to serve as the President of the Supreme Court of Nicaragua (2017)
- Becky McCrea: First Rama (female) lawyer in Nicaragua

== Panama ==
- Clara Gonzalez (1925): First female lawyer in Panama. She later became the first female Judge of the Juvenile Justice Court when it was created in 1951.
- Alma Montenegro de Fletcher: First female to serve as a notary public and prosecutor in Panama
- Marisol Milantia Reyes de Vásquez (c. 1958): First female appointed as a Magistrate (1974) and the President of the Supreme Court of Justice of Panama (1985)
- Graciela Dixon: First Black female justice appointed as the President of the Supreme Court of Justice of Panama (2005)
- Ana Matilde Gómez: First female to serve as the Attorney General of Panama (2005)
- Sara Omi Casamá: First Emberá female lawyer in Panama
- Dialys Ehrman: First Guna (female) lawyer in Panama
- Marta López de Martin: First female to serve as the President of the National Bar Association of Panama (2007)
- Katherin Flaco Chamarra (2023): First Embera-Wounaan female lawyer in Panama

== Saba (NLD) ==
- Dorothée de Sampayo: First female Magistrate of the Court of Justice of the Netherlands Antilles (1982-1986). She later became the first female Registrar of the International Criminal Tribunal for the former Yugoslavia. [Saba]
- Carla Bakhuis-Vinck: First female appointed as a Judge of the Court of Justice of the Netherlands Antilles (1987)
- Lisbeth Hoefdraad: First female appointed as the President of the Common Court of Justice of the Antilles and Aruba (2007-2013) [now called the Joint Court of Justice of Aruba, Curaçao, Sint Maarten, and of Bonaire, Sint Eustatius and Saba]
- Marian Veneberg: First female to serve as the Chief Prosecutor of the BES islands (Bonaire, Saba, and Sint Eustatius) (2021)

== Saint Barthélemy (FRA) ==
- Gerty Archimede (1939): First female lawyer in the French West Indies (Guadeloupe, Martinique, Saint Barthélemy and Saint Martin)
- Sylvie Favier: First female to serve as the President of the Administrative Courts of Basse-Terre, Saint Barthélemy and Saint Martin (2010)

== Saint Kitts and Nevis ==
- Arlene Magdalene Fraites-Gomez (1962): First female lawyer called to the Bar of Saint Kitts and Nevis (then "St. Kitts, Nevis and Anguilla"); also called to the Bar of Antigua and Barbuda and to the Bar of England and Wales (1962)
- Myrna R. Walwyn (1980): First female lawyer in Nevis
- Monica Theresa Joseph: First female appointed as a Justice of the Eastern Caribbean Supreme Court (1982)
- Velma L. Hylton (1967): First female assigned as a puisne judge in Saint Kitts and Nevis (1992)
- Yasmin Clarke: First female magistrate in Nevis (District “C”; 1998)
- Charmaine Pemberton: First (female) Master of the Eastern Caribbean Supreme Court (2000)
- Patricia Dublin-Lewis: First female to serve as President of the St. Kitts-Nevis Bar Association (2004-2007)
- Ianthea Leigertwood-Octave: First female to serve as the Resident Judge of Saint Kitts and Nevis (2005)
- Nicole Sylvester: First female to serve as the President of the Organization of Eastern Caribbean States (OECS) Bar Association (c. 2007)
- Janice Pereira (British Virgin Islands, 1981): First female (and British Virgin Islander) justice appointed as the Chief Justice of the Eastern Caribbean Supreme Court (2012)

== Saint Lucia ==
- Marie Grace Augustin, a St. Lucian who studied law, was on the verge of becoming the first female lawyer in the Commonwealth Caribbean in 1923. Augustin was denied the ability to take the bar exam that year, however, and so she entered the business industry instead.
- Daisy Borman (c. 1940s): First female to practice law in Saint Lucia
- Suzie d'Auvergne (c. 1975): First female magistrate (c. 1980) and judge in Saint Lucia (upon her appointment as a High Court Judge of the Eastern Caribbean Supreme Court in 1990). She was also Saint Lucia's first female Director of Public Prosecutions (1982) and Solicitor General (1988).
- Monica Theresa Joseph: First female appointed as a Justice of the Eastern Caribbean Supreme Court (1982)
- Charmaine Pemberton: First (female) Master of the Eastern Caribbean Supreme Court (2000)
- Lorraine Bernadine Williams: First female to serve as the Attorney General and Minister of Legal Affairs for Saint Lucia (1992). In 2001, she became the first female to serve as the President of the Saint Lucia Bar Association.
- Nicole Sylvester: First female to serve as the President of the Organization of Eastern Caribbean States (OECS) Bar Association (c. 2007)
- Edith Petra Jeffrey-Nelson and Renée T. St. Rose: First females respectively appointed King's Counsel in Saint Lucia (2025)

== Saint Martin (FRA) ==
- Gerty Archimede (1939): First female lawyer in the French West Indies (Guadeloupe, Martinique, Saint Barthélemy and Saint Martin)
- Sylvie Favier: First female to serve as the President of the Administrative Courts of Basse-Terre, Saint Barthélemy and Saint Martin (2010)

== Saint Pierre and Miquelon (FRA) ==
- Jade Reux (2017): First female student lawyer sworn in the Superior Court of Appeal of Saint-Pierre and Miquelon [Saint-Pierre and Miquelon]
- Valérie Lebreton: First female appointed as the President of the Court of Appeal of Saint-Pierre (2017) [Saint-Pierre and Miquelon]
- Caroline Gaussen-Calbo: First female to serve as the Public Prosecutor of the Tribunal de Grande of Saint-Pierre and Miquelon (2019)
- Hélène Rouland-Boyer: First female to serve as the President of the Administrative Courts of Martinique and Saint Pierre and Miquelon (2022)

== Saint Vincent and the Grenadines ==
- Agnes Cato: One of the first female lawyers in Saint Vincent and the Grenadines
- Sylvia Judith Bertrand (Admitted to Dominica Bar in 1969): First female judge in Saint Vincent and the Grenadines (1984)
- Monica Theresa Joseph: First female appointed as a Justice of the Eastern Caribbean Supreme Court (1982)
- Deborah Thomas-Felix: First (female) President of the Family Court of Saint Vincent and the Grenadines (1995)
- Charmaine Pemberton: First (female) Master of the Eastern Caribbean Supreme Court (2000)
- Judith Jones-Morgan (c. 1990s): First female appointed as the Attorney General of Saint Vincent and the Grenadines (2001)
- Nicole Sylvester: First female to serve as the President of the Organization of Eastern Caribbean States (OECS) Bar Association (c. 2007)
- Sejilla McDowall: First female appointed as the Director of Public Prosecutions in Saint Vincent and the Grenadines (2020)

== Sint Eustatius (NLD) ==
- Dorothée de Sampayo: First female Magistrate of the Court of Justice of the Netherlands Antilles (1982-1986). She later became the first female Registrar of the International Criminal Tribunal for the former Yugoslavia. [Sint Eustatius]
- Carla Bakhuis-Vinck: First female appointed as a Judge of the Court of Justice of the Netherlands Antilles (1987)
- Lisbeth Hoefdraad: First female appointed as the President of the Common Court of Justice of the Antilles and Aruba (2007-2013) [now called the Joint Court of Justice of Aruba, Curaçao, Sint Maarten, and of Bonaire, Sint Eustatius and Saba]
- Gisèle Veen-Jonkhout: First female Public Prosecutor of the Netherlands Antilles (2010)
- Marian Veneberg: First female to serve as the Chief Prosecutor of the BES islands (Bonaire, Saba, and Sint Eustatius) (2021)

== Sint Maarten (NLD) ==
- Dorothée de Sampayo: First female Magistrate of the Court of Justice of the Netherlands Antilles (1982-1986). She later became the first female Registrar of the International Criminal Tribunal for the former Yugoslavia. [Sint Maarten]
- Carla Bakhuis-Vinck: First female appointed as a Judge of the Court of Justice of the Netherlands Antilles (1987)
- Lisbeth Hoefdraad: First female appointed as the President of the Common Court of Justice of the Antilles and Aruba (2007-2013) [now called the Joint Court of Justice of Aruba, Curaçao, Sint Maarten, and of Bonaire, Sint Eustatius and Saba]
- Gisèle Veen-Jonkhout: First female Public Prosecutor of the Netherlands Antilles (2010)
- Rachnilda (Nilda) J.A. Arduin: First (female) Ombudsman for Sint Maarten (2010)
- Suzanne Camelia-Römer: First female to serve as an alternate member of the Constitutional Court of Sint Maarten (2010)
- Marlène F. Mingo: First female civil law notary in Sint Maarten (2013)
- Royanna Baly: First native-born (female) deputy prosecutor to work at Sint Maarten's Public Prosecutor's Office (2020)
- Valya Pantophlet: First (female) law school graduate in Sint Maarten (upon completing a legal program at the University of Curaçao in 2023)

== Trinidad and Tobago ==
- Gladys Eileen Ramsaran (1932): First female lawyer and magistrate (1948) in Trinidad and Tobago
- Mona Rigsby James (1939): First native-born female lawyer in Trinidad and Tobago
- Wendy Punnett-Hope: First female appointed as the Acting Deputy Registrar of the Supreme Court of Trinidad and Tobago (1970-1977). Brenda Paray-Durity later became the first permanent female Registrar.
- Marie Elizabeth Bourne-Hollands: First female judge in Trinidad and Tobago (upon her appointment as a Judge of the High Court of Trinidad and Tobago in 1972). She was also the first female lawyer in Barbados.
- Monica Barnes: First female from Trinidad and Tobago to be admitted to the Inner Bar and made a Senior Counsel (1979)
- Occah Seepaul (1964): First female appointed as the Master of the High Court of Trinidad and Tobago (1986-1993)
- Gladys Seedansingh Gafoor (1962): First female to serve as the Director of Public Prosecutions in Trinidad and Tobago (c. 1987)
- Amrika Tiwary-Reddy: First female to serve as the Acting Attorney General of Trinidad and Tobago (1989)
- Glenda Morean–Phillip: First female appointed as the President of the Law Association of Trinidad and Tobago (1989)
- Jean A. Permanand (1962): First female appointed as a Judge of the Appeal Court of Trinidad and Tobago (1993-2004).She was also the first female lawyer to become the Solicitor General in Trinidad and Tobago in the 1980s.
- Kamla Persad-Bissessar (1985): First female lawyer to become the Attorney General of Trinidad and Tobago (1995)
- Deborah Thomas-Felix: First female to serve as the Deputy Chief Magistrate in Trinidad and Tobago (2001). In 2014, she became the first Caribbean national (female) to serve as a Judge of the United Nations Appeals Tribunal (2014).
- Maureen Rajnauth-Lee: First female citizen of Trinidad and Tobago appointed as a Judge of the Caribbean Court of Justice (2015)
- Marcia Ayers-Caesar: First female to serve as the Chief Magistrate of the High Court of Trinidad and Tobago (2017)
- Althea Violet Alexis-Windsor: First Trinidadian female to serve as a Judge of the International Criminal Court (2021)

== See also ==
- Justice ministry
- List of first women lawyers and judges by nationality
- List of first women lawyers and judges in Africa
- List of first women lawyers and judges in Asia
- List of first women lawyers and judges in Europe
- List of first women lawyers and judges in Oceania
- List of first women lawyers and judges in South America
- List of first women lawyers and judges in the United States
- List of the first women holders of political offices in North and Central America and the Caribbean
