= Strax affair =

1968–69 event at the University of New Brunswick

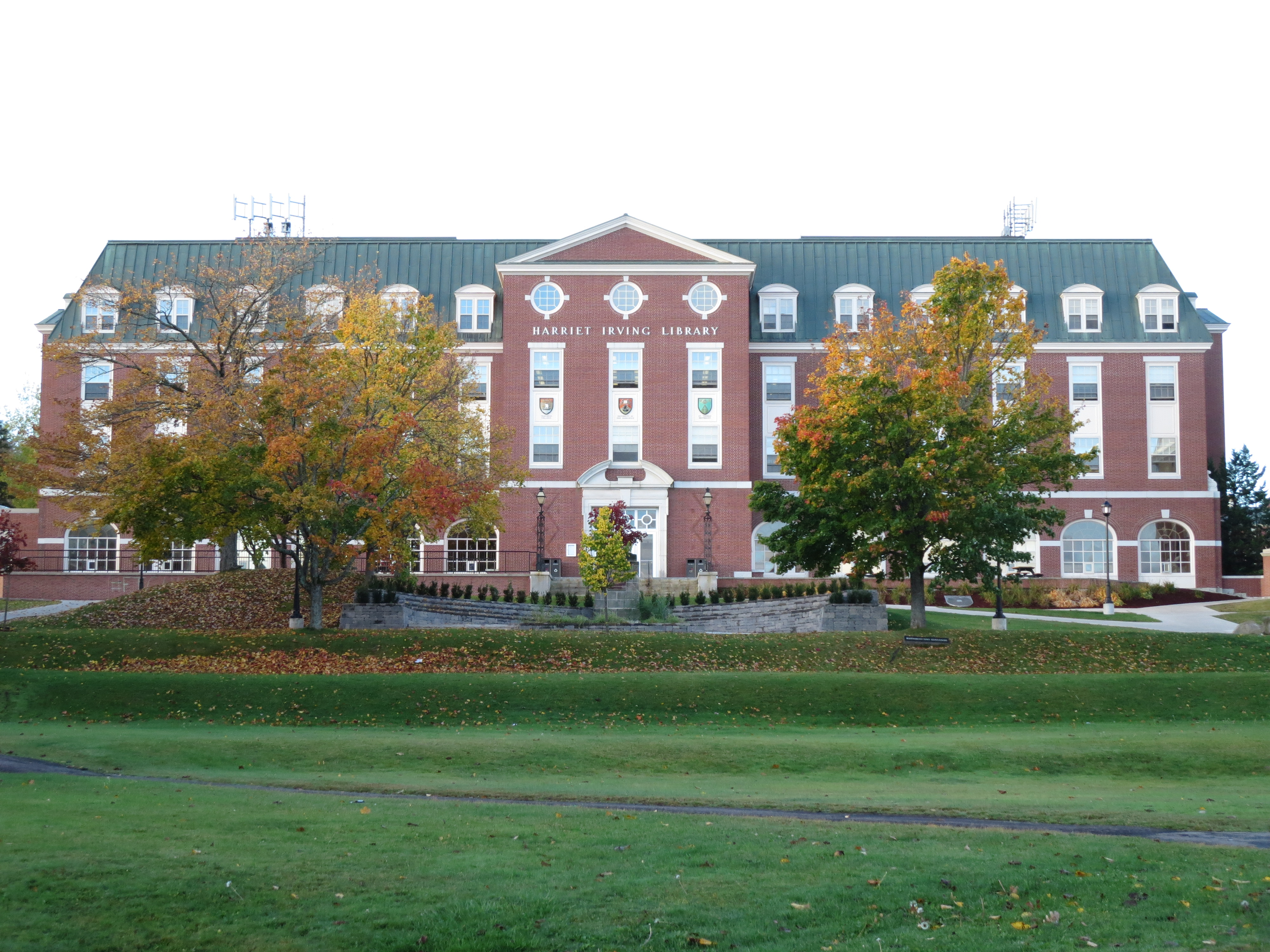
The Harriet Irving Library at UNB

The Strax affair was a sequence of events at the University of New Brunswick (UNB) in Fredericton in 1968 and 1969. It began in September 1968 when the university president suspended Norman Strax, a young physics professor, after Strax led protests in the university library against the introduction of photo ID cards. The suspension, and UNB's subsequent legal proceedings against Strax, led to the institution's being censured by the Canadian Association of University Teachers (CAUT). Other components of the affair were the lengthy occupation of Strax's former office by his supporters and the jailing of a student for an article that appeared in the student newspaper questioning the objectivity of the New Brunswick legal system. The formal lifting of the CAUT censure in September 1969 brought the Strax affair to an end.

== Background ==
=== The University of New Brunswick ===
In 1968 the University of New Brunswick (UNB) had a student body of 4,800. Colin B. Mackay had been the university's president since 1953, during which time it had greatly expanded, evolving from "a professional school emphasizing science and applied science" to one that provided "a more general education with emphasis on the humanities and social sciences".

In 1968 the university's governance structure was reorganized with the aim of giving faculty members control of academic affairs. The University of New Brunswick Act of 1968 led to the formation of two governing bodies, both chaired by the president. The Board of Governors, whose role was to oversee and give guidance to the president as "chief executive officer," was to have four faculty representatives, while the majority of the Senate was to be made up of faculty members elected by their peers.

The Association of University of New Brunswick Teachers (AUNBT) had been in existence as the university's faculty association since 1956. In 1967 the Canadian Association of University Teachers (CAUT) released its "Policy Statement on Academic Appointments and Tenure", which was subsequently used as the basis for negotiation between faculty and administration at Canadian universities, although it was not endorsed by the Association of Universities and Colleges of Canada (AUCC).

=== Norman Strax ===
Norman Strax was an assistant professor of physics at the University of New Brunswick. Born in 1935 in Brooklyn, he was a son of Philip Strax, a physician. Norman Strax was a 1957 graduate of Princeton University and earned a PhD from Harvard University in 1966. In July 1966 he began a probationary appointment "of from one to two years" at UNB.

Strax opposed the Vietnam War and encouraged student activism at UNB. He was a leading figure in the "Mobilization Against the War in Vietnam", a group which identified with Students for a Democratic Society (SDS) but was not an official chapter of it. Strax saw it as his role to make students aware of the "need to protest actively against all sorts of authoritarianism, injustice and, in particular, the U.S. participation and Canada's 'complicity' in the Vietnam War".

In October 1967 the Mobilization, led by Strax, organized bus transportation for approximately 150 people from Fredericton to Washington, D.C., for the March on the Pentagon. This aroused the indignation of Calais, Maine, American Legion branch leaders, who complained to U.S.Senators Edmund Muskie and Margaret Chase Smith. The trip was also condemned by the Fredericton branch of the Royal Canadian Legion and the city's newspaper, The Daily Gleaner. Approximately 50 UNB students disrupted a Mobilization meeting in November, chanting "Down with Strax".

In February 1968 Strax was among Mobilization members who staged an occupation and sit-in at the Centennial Building in Fredericton, disrupting a meeting between the provincial government and the Students Representative Council about university tuition fees. Handbills distributed by the Mobilization members alleged exploitation of "workers and students" by a provincial government "under the thumb of K. C. Irving and other capitalist interests".

In April 1968 Strax participated in the Columbia University protests, and he was in Chicago for the 1968 Democratic National Convention protests.

In the summer of 1968 the university extended Strax's probationary appointment for one year, to June 30, 1969, subject to several conditions, including more participation in departmental activities and increased research output.

== Strax's suspension ==
In the fall term of 1968 photo ID cards were introduced at UNB. Their use was supported by the Students Representative Council (SRC) and the implementation costs were split between the SRC and the university. However, Strax and other activists saw them as "infringement on individual rights, smacking of police-state tactics" and "decided to counter-attack" at the campus library, where the cards had to be presented in order to sign out books.

On September 20, Strax and several students repeatedly carried piles of library books to the circulation desk and demanded to be allowed to sign them out without UNB ID cards. After repeated refusals by library staff, the library building was closed early. Similar demonstrations took place on September 21 and 23. On September 24, Mackay suspended Strax from UNB "effective immediately", informing him by letter that "you no longer have any duties to perform here, and that all rights and privileges are withdrawn which normally belong to a member of its faculty". The letter to Strax did not state a reason for his suspension. The newly enacted UNB Act allowed the president to suspend a faculty member but required him to inform the Board of Governors of his action and the reason for it. Mackay called a special meeting of the board for September 28 to deal with the matter.

On September 27 Strax and a number of supporters moved into Strax's office in Loring Bailey Hall and refused to leave, beginning an occupation that lasted over a month and became known as "Liberation 130" after the office number.

The Board of Governors struck a committee of faculty members to study the matter, meet with Strax, and report on October 8. Meanwhile, the president took Strax to court, applying on September 30 for injunctions to remove Strax from the campus and prevent him from "returning to or entering upon any part of the lands and premises of the university", and to declare him "duly and regularly suspended", as well as claiming damages for "nuisance, trespass and disturbance".

Strax was summoned to appear in court in Saint John. After initially refusing to leave the campus, he complied on October 2. The judge upheld the injunction barring Strax from returning to campus and charged him with contempt of court for not having complied immediately with the court summons. The contempt charge was scheduled to be heard in November.

The committee was not ready to report to the October 8 Board of Governors meeting, which decided to wait until it received the report before taking action on the suspension. The meeting was the occasion of student demonstrations both for and against Strax. In the morning some of his supporters occupied the hall outside the room where the meeting was being held, blocking the exit so that some members had to be lifted over the prone bodies of the demonstrators. In the afternoon, at a ceremony to open a new building on campus, Mackay was cheered by a crowd of students who approved of his actions against Strax.

The committee tasked with looking into Strax's dismissal submitted its report to the Board of Governors on November 1. They determined that he had been suspended because of his actions in the library, not for any of his other political activities, but made no comment on whether or not the suspension was justified.

== Liberation 130 ==
After an injunction removed Strax from the UNB campus in early October, the occupation of his office continued as a protest against his suspension. Strax's supporters were subject to periodic attacks by groups of other students who supported the administration's actions. These included "breaking of windows; ladders being placed against Bailey Hall to try and access the room through a window; rocks, beer bottles, eggs, and garbage were thrown at and into the room, and even mild tear gas was used". The occupation ended on November 10 when Fredericton City Police forced their way into the room and arrested the seven protestors who were present. They were charged with mischief but the charges were later dropped.

== Prosecution of Strax ==
In November, Strax appeared in court in Saint John before Justice J. Paul Barry, who had issued the original injunctions at the request of President Mackay. Strax's lawyers argued that his suspension was illegal and that Mackay had not followed proper procedures in seeking the injunctions without Board of Governors authorization. The judge found against Strax, sentencing him to a $500 fine and 30 days in jail for violating the injunctions. He served his sentence beginning on November 19, 1968.

During the proceedings the judge dismissed one of Strax's lawyers from the case because he had asked the university librarian to testify without informing the prosecution beforehand. Another witness, Tom Murphy, was a UNB student who had been called by the same lawyer to testify in Strax's defense. Murphy wrote a column which was published in the December 3 issue of The Brunswickan, the student newspaper, describing his experiences at the trial, which he called a "mockery of justice". He said that the judge was biased against Strax and that in general the New Brunswick courts were "simply the instruments of the corporate elite".

In late December Justice Barry filed his judgment regarding Strax's suspension. He ruled that the suspension was legal and that Strax's presence on the campus after September 24 constituted trespassing, so the injunctions were again upheld. He ordered Strax to pay $2,000 in exemplary damages, plus court costs, for having acted "in a 'high-handed fashion' and persisted in ignoring the rights of others".

== Contempt prosecutions of students ==
The publication of Tom Murphy's article in The Brunswickan led to charges of contempt of court against him and the newspaper's editor, John Oliver. This was the first time in New Brunswick history that anyone had been charged with contempt for publishing an article in a student newspaper. Oliver pleaded guilty and printed a retraction in The Brunswickan. At a court appearance on January 29, 1969, he was sentenced to pay $50 or spend 15 days in jail. Friends and supporters in the courtroom took up a collection to pay the fine.

Murphy contested the charge and appeared in the Appeals Division of the Supreme Court of New Brunswick on January 22, 1969, to "show cause why he should not be charged with contempt of court". He was represented by Alan Borovoy, the newly appointed general counsel of the Canadian Civil Liberties Association. Borovoy put forward several defenses including Murphy's right to freedom of speech and the unlikelihood that an article in a student newspaper would "denigrate the court in the eyes of the community". He also objected to the case's being initially heard in the New Brunswick court of appeal, which would make it impossible for Murphy to appeal within the province. His only recourse would have been the Supreme Court of Canada.

Murphy was found guilty and sentenced to ten days in jail, with one day off for good behaviour. He was released from the York County Gaol in Fredericton on March 20, 1969.

== Censure by the CAUT ==
In October 1968 the Canadian Association of University Teachers (CAUT) called on the university to inform Strax of the reasons for his suspension, and to set up an arbitration procedure allowing him to defend himself. UNB did not respond, and at the CAUT National Council meeting on November 16–17 UNB was criticized for "suspending a faculty member without stated charges or provisions for an adjudicative hearing".

The Board of Governors declined to deal with the Strax affair as long as UNB's court proceedings against him were unsettled. Their determination to wait another month in case he appealed the decision made at the end of December 1968 meant further delay and noncompliance with the CAUT request for arbitration. On January 17, 1969, the CAUT demanded that UNB initiate arbitration, rescind the injunctions against Strax, and pay his court costs. Otherwise the university risked censure by the CAUT. Censure meant that CAUT members "would be advised not to accept appointments there and others ... would be advised to inform themselves of the CAUT reasons for the censure." The Board of Governors agreed to arbitration but refused to dissolve the injunction or pay Strax's costs. On March 15 the CAUT council voted to censure UNB. On March 20 more than 1,000 students demonstrated outside a UNB Board of Governors meeting, urging the Board to act. The Board agreed to the CAUT's demands, including setting up an arbitration procedure and applying to have the injunctions lifted. The removal of censure was delayed by the judge's initial refusal to lift the injunctions and then by Strax's inability to retain a representative on the arbitration tribunal. The censure was lifted on September 2, 1969, after UNB agreed not to claim damages and costs from Strax.

== Aftermath ==
Mackay left his position as president of UNB at the end of June 1969, acknowledging that he was "not a democrat" and that a different type of leadership was required for UNB. Strax's contract with the university ended on July 1. He stayed in the Fredericton area for 10 years and later taught at Wabash College. He died in 2002 in New York City.

The outcome of the Strax affair helped to establish "standards of due process for academic employment in Canada" based on the CAUT policy statement of 1967.
