= Strax =

Strax may refer to:

- Strax affair, a sequence of events at the University of New Brunswick in the late 1960s
- Philip Strax (1909–1999), American radiologist and pioneer in the use of mammography
- Commander Strax, a fictional character in the British science fiction television series Doctor Who
