= Women in law in Canada =

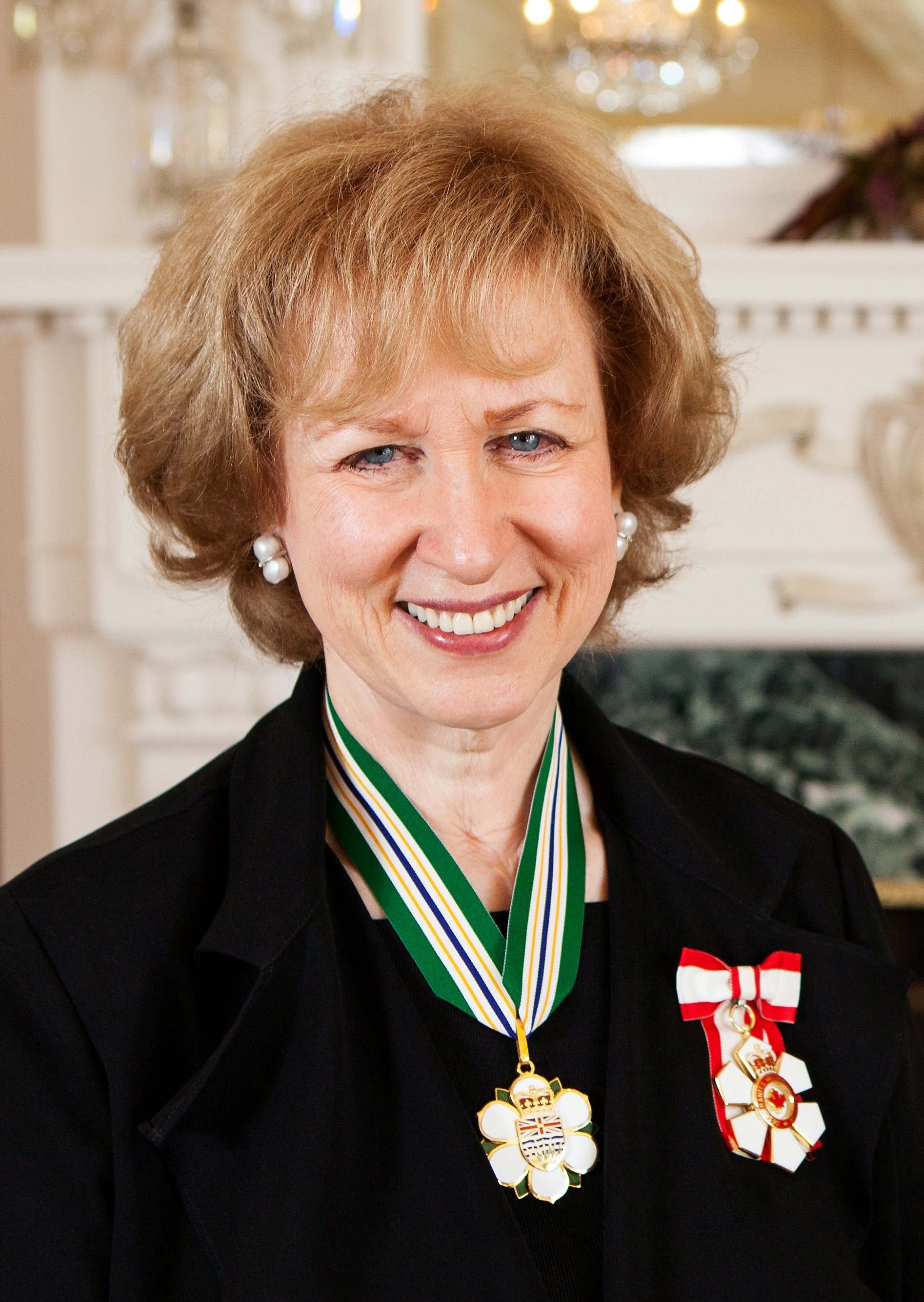
Canadian lawyer Kim Campbell was the 19th Prime Minister of Canada from June 25, 1993 to November 4, 1993. She was Canada's first, and to date only, female prime minister.

Women work in the legal profession and related occupations throughout Canada, as lawyers (also called barristers, attorneys or legal counselors), prosecutors, judges, legal scholars, law professors and law school deans. In Canada, while 37.1% of lawyers are women, "50% ...said they felt their [law] firms were doing "poorly" or "very poorly" in their provision of flexible work arrangements". It was also reported that, in 2006 in Ontario, "racialized women accounted for 16% of all lawyers under 30" and that only 1% of lawyers were Aboriginal.

== Representation and working conditions ==
In 2010 in Canada, "there were 22,261 practicing women lawyers and 37,617 practicing men lawyers." Canadian studies show that "50% of lawyers said they felt their firms were doing "poorly" or "very poorly" in their provision of flexible work arrangements." More women lawyers found it "difficult to manage the demands of work and personal/family life" than men, with 75% of women reporting these challenges versus 66% of men associates. A 2010 report about Ontario lawyers from 1971 to 2006 indicates that "racialized women accounted for 16% of all lawyers under 30, compared to 5% of lawyers 30 and older in 2006. Visible minority lawyers accounted for 11.5% of all lawyers in 2006. Aboriginal lawyers accounted for 1.0% of all lawyers in 2006.

== Notable individuals ==
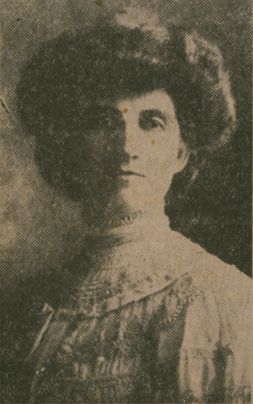
Canadian Clara Brett Martin became the first woman lawyer in the British Empire in 1897 after a lengthy dispute with the Law Society of Upper Canada, which argued–unsuccessfully–that only men could become lawyers

At the end of the nineteenth century, Canadian women were barred from participation in, let alone any influence on or control over, the legal system–women could not become lawyers, magistrates, judges, jurors, voters or legislators.

Clara Brett Martin (1874–1923) became the first female lawyer in the British Empire in 1897 after a lengthy debate in which the Law Society of Upper Canada tried to prevent her from joining the legal profession. After graduating with a Bachelor of Arts in 1891, Martin submitted a petition to the Law Society to become a member. Her petition was rejected by the Society after contentious debate, with the Society ruling that only men could be admitted to the practice of law, because the Society's statute stated that only a "person" could become a lawyer. At that time, women were not considered to be "persons" in Canada, from a legal perspective. W.D. Balfour sponsored a bill that provided that the word "person" in the Law Society's statute should be interpreted to include females as well as males. Martin's cause was also supported by prominent women of the day including Emily Stowe and Lady Aberdeen. With the support of the Premier, Oliver Mowat, legislation was passed on April 13, 1892, which permitted the admission of women as solicitors.

In 1905, Mabel French was the first woman to graduate from King's College Law School with a Bachelor of Civil Law, but was barred from entrance to the New Brunswick bar. In 1907, due to pressure from women, including a campaign by the Canadian University Women's Club, the Legislative Assembly of New Brunswick passed "An Act to Remove the Disability of Women so far as Relates to the Study and Practice of the Law". French was then called to the Bar. She also became the first woman to practice law in two separate Canadian provinces: New Brunswick and British Columbia.

Alice Jamieson and Emily Murphy were the first female judges respectively in Canada (Alberta; 1914–1916). Helen Kinnear QC (1894–1970) was a Canadian lawyer who was the first federally appointed woman judge in Canada (1943). She was the first woman in the British Commonwealth to be created a King's Counsel (1934) and the first in the Commonwealth appointed to a county-court bench and the first female lawyer in Canada to appear as counsel before the Supreme Court in Canada in 1935.

In 1942, Elizabeth Monk (1898-1980) and Suzanne Raymond Filion were the first two women admitted to the Barreau du Québec. Marie-Claire Kirkland-Casgrain CM CQ (born 1924) is a Quebec lawyer, judge and politician who was the first woman elected to the Legislative Assembly of Quebec, the first woman appointed a Cabinet minister in Quebec, the first woman appointed acting premier, and the first woman judge to serve in the Quebec Provincial Court.

Marlys Edwardh CM (born 1950) is a Canadian litigation and civil rights lawyer who was one of the first women to practice criminal law in Canada.

In 1946, Gretta Wong Grant became the first female lawyer of Chinese descent in Canada. In 1954, Violet King Henry became the first Black female lawyer in Canada. In 1977, Marion Ironquil Meadmore became the first indigenous female lawyer in Canada. Roberta Jamieson C.M. is a Canadian lawyer and First Nations activist who was the first Aboriginal woman ever to earn a law degree in Canada, the first non-Parliamentarian to be appointed an ex officio member of a House of Commons committee and the first woman appointed as Ontario Ombudsman. Delia Opekokew is a Cree woman from the Canoe Lake First Nation in Saskatchewan, who was the first First Nations lawyer admitted to the law societies in Ontario and in Saskatchewan as well as the first woman ever to run for the leadership of the Assembly of First Nations. Opekokew graduated from Osgoode Hall in 1977, and was admitted to the Bar of Ontario in 1979 and to the Bar of Saskatchewan in 1983. Also, in 1983, Alicia Natividad became the Filipina lawyer in Canada. Vivene Salmon became the first Black (female) President of the Canadian Bar Association in 2019.

In 1969, Réjane Laberge-Colas became the first female appointed as a Judge of the Superior Court in Canada. Gabrielle Vallée became the first female appointed as the Associate Chief Justice of a Superior Court of Canada. Constance Glube was the first female appointed as a Chief Justice in Canada in 1982. She was also the first female appointed as a Justice of the Nova Scotia Supreme Court. In 1987, Corrine Sparks became the first Black female judge in Canada when appointed to the Nova Scotia Family Court. Maryka Omatsu became the first East Asian female judge in Canada in 1992. Rose Boyko was the first aboriginal woman appointed as a superior court judge in Canada in 1994. In 2009, Boyko became the first Canadian (female) to serve as a Judge of the United Nations Appeals Tribunal. In 2017, Palbinder Shergill became the first (female) turbaned judge in Canada (upon her appointment to the Supreme Court of British Columbia). In 2025, Marcela S. Aroca became the first Hispanic-Latin American (female) judge in the country upon her appointment to the Tax Court of Canada.

Bertha Wilson became the first female appointed as a Justice of the Supreme Court in Canada in 1982. She was also the first female to sit on the Ontario Court of Appeal in 1975. Beverley McLachlin PC (born 1943) is the 17th Chief Justice of the Supreme Court of Canada (2000–2017), the first woman to hold this position, and the longest serving Chief Justice in Canadian history. She was also the first female appointed as a Judge of the British Columbia Court of Appeal (1985) and Chief Justice of the British Columbia Supreme Court (1988). In her role as Chief Justice, she also served as a Deputy of the Governor General of Canada. When Governor General Adrienne Clarkson was hospitalized for a cardiac pacemaker operation on 8 July 2005, Chief Justice McLachlin served as the Deputy of the Governor General of Canada and performed the duties of the Governor General as the Administrator of Canada. In her role as Administrator, she gave royal assent to the Civil Marriage Act, effectively legalizing same-sex marriage in Canada. In 2001, Sharon A. Williams became the first Canadian (female) appointed as an ad litem judge for the International Criminal Tribunal for the former Yugoslavia. Rosalie Abella became the first Jewish female appointed to the Supreme Court of Canada in 2004. She became Canada's first Jewish female judge in 1976, as well as the first woman to serve on the bench while pregnant in the country's history. In 2011, Andromache Karakatsanis became the first Greek-Canadian (female) to become a Justice of the Supreme Court of Canada.

Some Canadian lawyers have become notable for their achievements in politics, including Kim Campbell, Mélanie Joly, Anne McLellan, Rachel Notley and Jody Wilson-Raybould.

Notable Canadian legal professionals include:

- Louise Arbour CC GOQ (born 1947) was the UN High Commissioner for Human Rights, a former justice of the Supreme Court of Canada and the Court of Appeal for Ontario and a former Chief Prosecutor of the International Criminal Tribunals for the former Yugoslavia and Rwanda. She made history with the indictment of a sitting head of state, Yugoslavian president Slobodan Milošević, as well as the first prosecution of sexual assault under the articles of crimes against humanity.
- Kim Campbell PC CC OBC KC (born 1947) is a Canadian politician, diplomat, lawyer and writer who served as the 19th Prime Minister of Canada, from June 25, 1993 to November 4, 1993. Campbell was the first, and to date, only female prime minister of Canada, She earned an LL.B. from the University of British Columbia in 1983. Campbell also served as the first female Attorney General of Canada (1990-1993).
- Catherine Fraser (born 1947) was appointed as Chief Justice of Alberta and Chief Justice of Northwest Territories in 1992. She was named as the Chief Justice of the Nunavut Court of Appeal on March 24, 1999.
- Jennifer Stoddart (born 1949) was the sixth Privacy Commissioner of Canada. In 1980 she received a licence in civil law from McGill University. As a lawyer she worked to modernize regulations and remove barriers to employment based on gender or cultural differences. She headed the Quebec Commission on Access to Information and held senior positions at the Quebec Human Rights and Youth Rights Commission, the Canadian Human Rights Commission and the Canadian Advisory Council on the Status of Women.
- Martha Hall Findlay (born 1959) is a Canadian businesswoman, entrepreneur, lawyer and politician from Toronto, Ontario. She was elected to the House of Commons of Canada as the Liberal Party of Canada's candidate in a Toronto riding.
- Beth Symes CM Queen's University alumna is a Canadian lawyer who fought the Canada Revenue Agency (CRA, formerly known as Revenue Canada) all the way to the Supreme Court of Canada in an unsuccessful attempt to deduct childcare expenses she incurred to earn income as a partner in her law firm. Symes practised law full-time as a partner in a law firm from 1982 until 1985. During that period she employed a nanny to care for her children, and deducted the wages paid to the nanny as a business expense on her personal income tax return. Revenue Canada initially allowed these deductions, but later disallowed them. Symes objected to the re-assessment, but CRA denied the objection. Symes appealed to the Federal Court, which ruled that the expenses were valid and legitimate business expenses. The case was appealed to the Supreme Court of Canada (SCC), which ruled in Symes v. Canada [1993] that her childcare expenses were not deductible as business expenses.

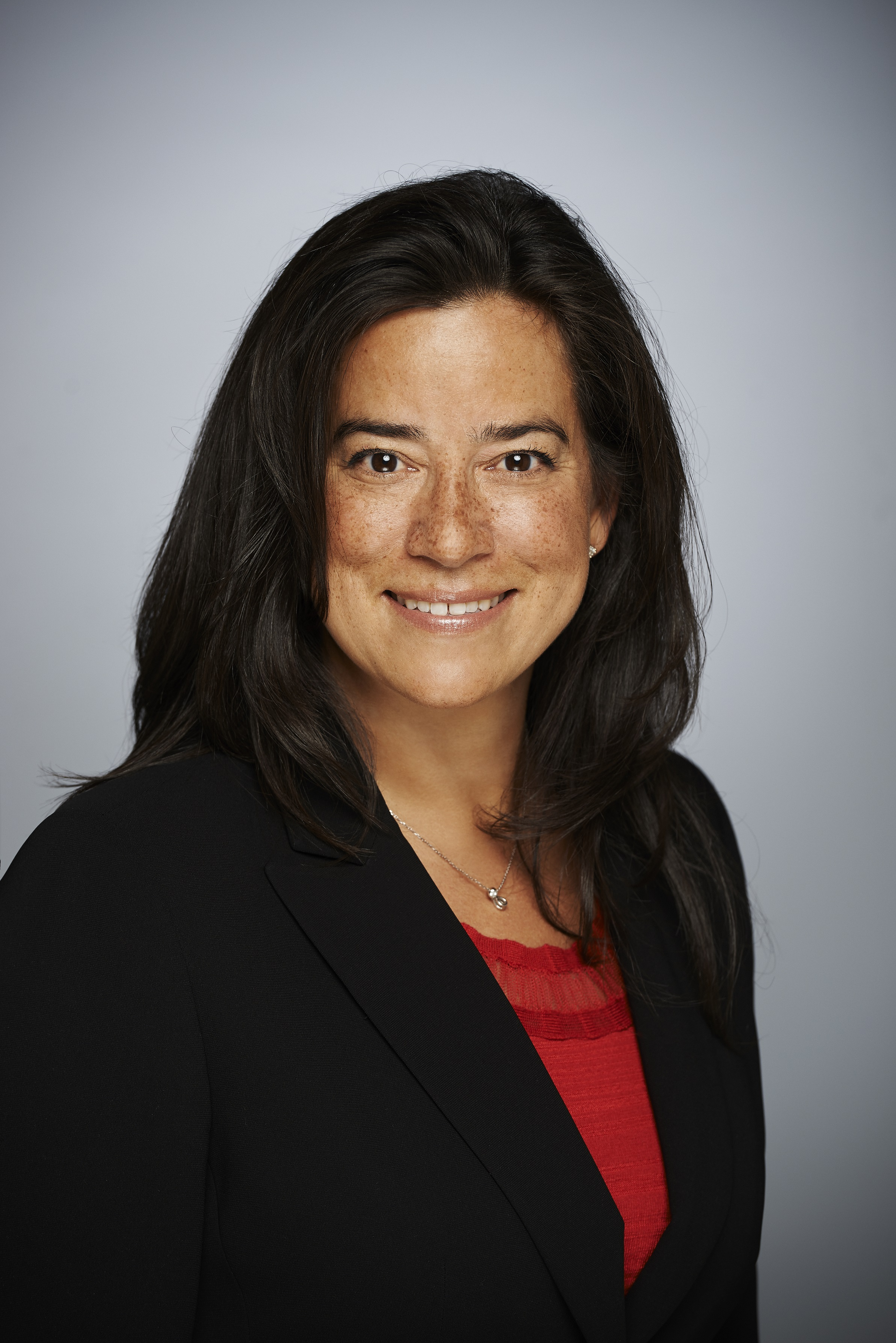
Jody Wilson-Raybould was Minister of Justice and Attorney General of Canada.

- Marie Henein is a Canadian lawyer. She is a partner of Henein Hutchison LLP, a law firm in Toronto. Henein has developed a reputation in Toronto as one of the most "respected and feared criminal lawyers in the country." The National Post called her the "most high profile criminal defence lawyer in the country." In 2011, Canadian Lawyer magazine named her one of the "Top 25 Most Influential" saying she was "one of the most sought-after criminal lawyers in the country" and "a key go-to lawyer for high-profile accused in Toronto."
- Anne McLellan PC OC AOE (born 1950) is a Canadian lawyer, academic and politician. She was a cabinet minister in the Liberal governments of Jean Chrétien and Paul Martin, serving as Deputy Prime Minister of Canada. On February 26, 2015, she was appointed chancellor of Dalhousie University effective May 25. She was a professor of law at the University of New Brunswick and the University of Alberta Faculty of Law where she served at various times as associate dean and dean. In 2009, McLellan was appointed an Officer of the Order of Canada for her service as a politician and law professor, and for her contributions as a community volunteer.
- Rachel Notley (born 1964) is a Canadian politician and the 17th and current Premier of Alberta, since 2015. Notley's career before politics focused on labour law, with a specialty in workers' compensation advocacy and workplace health and safety issues.
- Mélanie Joly PC MP (born 1979) is a Canadian lawyer, public relations expert, and politician. She is a Liberal member of the House of Commons of Canada representing Ahuntsic-Cartierville and also serves as the Minister of Canadian Heritage in the Cabinet, headed by Justin Trudeau.
- Jody Wilson-Raybould PC MP (born 1971) is a Kwakwaka'wakw Canadian politician and the Independent Member of Parliament for the riding of Vancouver Granville. She was sworn in as Minister of Justice of Canada on November 4, 2015; the first Indigenous person to be named to that post. Before entering Canadian federal politics, she was a provincial Crown prosecutor, B.C. Treaty Commissioner and Regional Chief of the B.C. Assembly of First Nations. She earned a law degree from the University of British Columbia Faculty of Law.
