= Willem van Schendel =

Willem van Schendel may refer to

- Willem van Schendel (jurist), 1950–2024, a Dutch jurist
- Willem van Schendel (historian), born 1949, a Dutch historian on South and Southeast Asia, known for the developing the geographical concept of Zomia
