= Fear of Music =

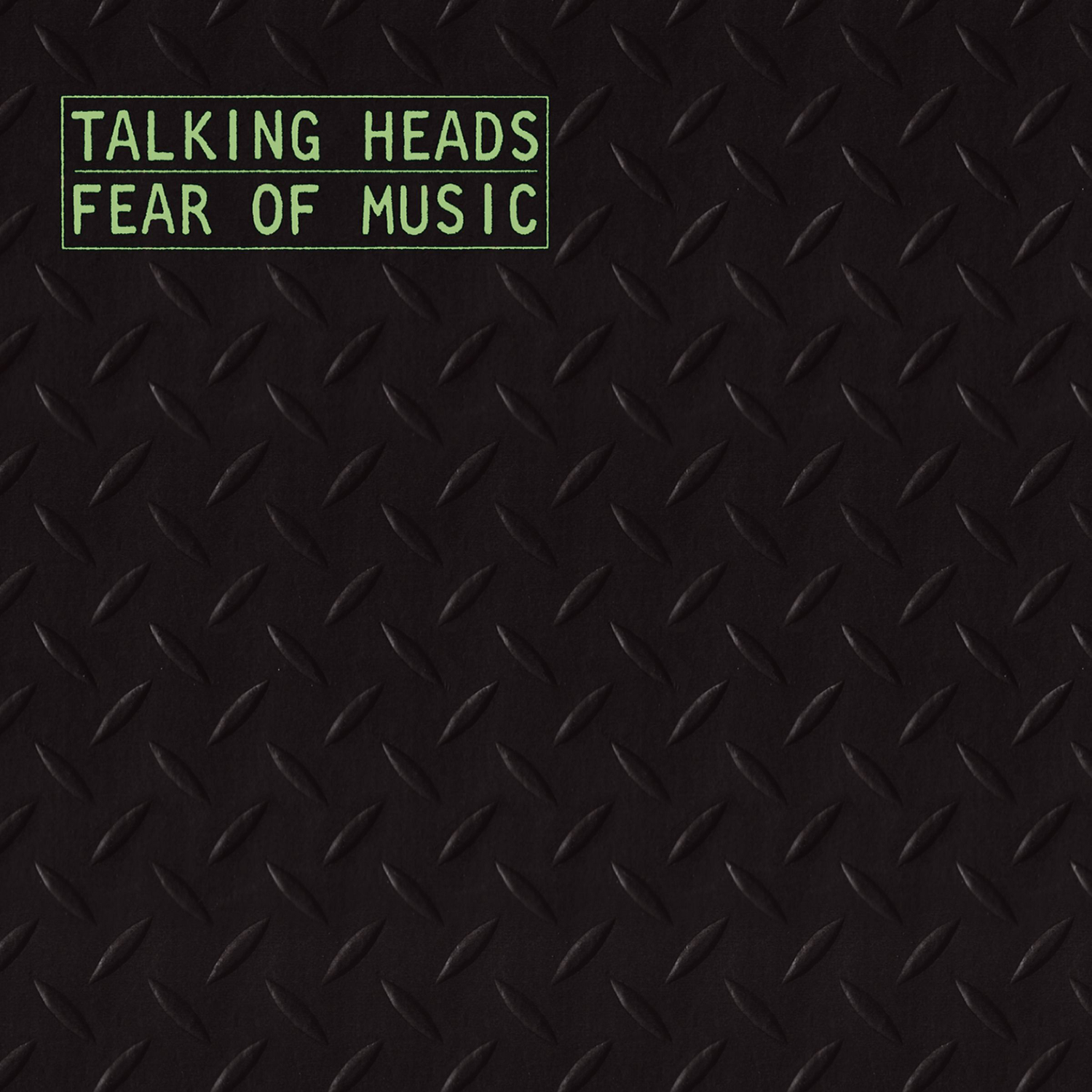

Studio album by Talking Heads
- Released: August 3, 1979
- Recorded: April 22–May 6, 1979
- Studios: Chris Frantz and Tina Weymouth's loft (Long Island City); The Hit Factory (New York City); Atlantic (New York City); R.P.M. (New York City); Record Plant (New York City)
- Genre: New wave
- Length: 40:40
- Label: Sire
- Producers: Brian Eno; Talking Heads

Talking Heads chronology
More Songs About Buildings and Food (1978)	Fear of Music (1979)	Remain in Light (1980)

Singles from Fear of Music
- 1. "Life During Wartime" Released: October 14, 1979; 2. "Air" Released: 1979 (Japan); 3. "I Zimbra" Released: February 7, 1980; 4. "Cities" Released: July 8, 1980

Fear of Music is the third album by the American rock band Talking Heads, released on August 3, 1979, by Sire Records. It was recorded at locations in New York City during April and May 1979 and was produced by Brian Eno and Talking Heads. The album reached No. 21 on the U.S. Billboard 200 and No. 33 on the UK Albums Chart. It spawned the singles "Life During Wartime", "I Zimbra", and "Cities".

Fear of Music received favorable reviews from critics. Praise centered on its unconventional rhythms and lead vocalist David Byrne's lyrical performances. The album is often considered one of Talking Heads' best releases and has been featured in several publications' lists of the best albums of all time.

== Background ==
Talking Heads' second album More Songs About Buildings and Food, released in 1978, expanded the band's sonic palette. The record included a hit single, a cover version of Al Green's 1974 song "Take Me to the River", which gained the quartet commercial exposure. In March 1979, the band members played the song on the American music and dance television program American Bandstand. In the days after the performance, they decided they did not want to be regarded simply as "a singles machine".

Talking Heads entered a New York City studio without a producer in the spring of 1979 and rehearsed demo tracks. Musically, the band wanted to expand on the "subtly disguised" disco rhythms present in More Songs About Buildings and Food by making them more prominent in the mixes of new songs. These recording plans were shelved after the quartet was not pleased with the results. A decision was then taken to rehearse in drummer Chris Frantz and bassist Tina Weymouth's loft in Long Island City, Queens, where the band members had played while unsigned in the mid-1970s. Brian Eno, who had produced More Songs About Buildings and Food, was called in to help.

== Recording and production ==
On April 22 and May 6, 1979, a audio engineering crew in a Record Plant van parked outside Frantz's and Weymouth's apartment building and ran cables through their loft window. On these two days, Talking Heads recorded the basic tracks with Eno.

Weymouth later stated that Byrne's sense of rhythm is "insane but fantastic" and that he was key to the band's recording drive during the home sessions. As songs evolved, the performances became easier for the band members. Eno was instrumental in shaping both their sound and recording confidence, and worked on electronic treatments of tracks.

== Composition ==
Fear of Music is largely built on an eclectic mix of disco rhythms, cinematic soundscapes, and conventional rock music elements.

Byrne credits the inspiration for the album, especially "Life During Wartime", to life on Avenue A in the East Village. Instead of incorporating characters in society, as he did on More Songs About Buildings and Food, Byrne decided to place them alone in dystopian situations. Weymouth was initially skeptical of Byrne's new compositions, but he managed to persuade her.

Album opener "I Zimbra" is influenced by Afrobeat and disco, and includes guitar work by Robert Fripp of King Crimson and background chanting from assistant audio engineer Julie Last. The nonsensical lyrics are based on the poem "Gadji beri bimba" by German Dadaist author and poet Hugo Ball. Band member Jerry Harrison has said that this song influenced what the band was to do on their next studio album, Remain in Light (1980).

"Cities" details a search for the ideal urban settlement to live in and was born out of Talking Heads' preferences for urban homes, especially in Manhattan. "Paper" compares a love affair to a simple piece of paper. In "Life During Wartime", Byrne casts himself an "unheroic urban guerrilla", who has renounced parties, survives on basic supplies like peanut butter, and hears rumors about weapons shipments and impromptu graveyards. The character's only connection is to the imminent collapse of his civilization. Byrne considered the persona "believable and plausible". "Air" is a protest song against the atmosphere, an idea Byrne does not consider "a joke". Inspired by The Threepenny Opera (1928) by Bertolt Brecht and Kurt Weill, the lyricist wanted to create a melancholic and touching track about a person who feels so depressed that even breathing feels painful.

== Artwork ==
The LP sleeve was designed by Harrison. It is completely black and embossed with a pattern that resembles the appearance and texture of tread plate metal flooring, reflecting the album's urban subject matter. The rest of the artwork was crafted by Byrne and includes heat-sensitive photography created by Jimmy Garcia with the help of Doctor Philip Strax. The design was nominated for the 1980 Grammy Award for Best Recording Package. Harrison suggested the "ludicrous" title to the band; according to Weymouth, it was accepted because it "fit" the album's themes and the quartet's stress during the album's production.

== Promotion and release ==
After completing Fear of Music, Talking Heads embarked on their first Pacific region tour in June 1979 and played concerts in New Zealand, Australia, Japan, and Hawaii. The album was released worldwide on August 3.

A U.S. tour to showcase the new material was completed during August 1979. At the time, Byrne told Rolling Stone, "We're in a funny position. It wouldn't please us to make music that's impossible to listen to, but we don't want to compromise for the sake of popularity." The band shared the headliner slots with Irish performers Van Morrison and the Chieftains at the Edinburgh festival in September, and embarked on a promotional European tour until the end of the year.

== Reception ==
Professional ratings
Review scores
Source	Rating
AllMusic	5/5 stars
Chicago Tribune	3/4 stars
Christgau's Record Guide	A−
Consequence	A+
The Irish Times	5/5 stars
Mojo	5/5 stars
Pitchfork	10/10
The Rolling Stone Album Guide	4.5/5 stars
Spin Alternative Record Guide	9/10
Uncut	9/10

=== Critical ===
The album received widespread critical acclaim.The Washington Post said that the album "illustrate how new wave can serve as musical discourse for challenging ideas." Jon Pareles, writing in Rolling Stone, was impressed with its "unswerving rhythms" and Byrne's lyrical evocations; he concluded, "Fear of Music is often deliberately, brilliantly disorienting. Like its black, corrugated packaging (which resembles a manhole cover), the album is foreboding, inescapably urban and obsessed with texture." John Rockwell of The New York Times suggested that the record was not a conventional rock release, while Stephanie Pleet of the Daily Collegian commented that it showed a positive progression in Talking Heads' musical style. Robert Christgau, writing in The Village Voice, praised the album's "gritty weirdness", but noted that "a little sweetening might help". Richard Cromelin of the Los Angeles Times was impressed with Byrne's "awesome vocal performance" and its nuances and called Fear of Music "a quantum leap" for the band. Tom Bentkowski of New York concluded, "But what makes the record so successful, perhaps, is a genuinely felt anti-elitism. Talking Heads was clever enough to make the intellectual infectious and even danceable."

On the contrary Tom Sullivan of The Observer offered a negative review comparing the LP to its two predecessors, saying that it lacks of societal analogies mixed with punk expressions. He continued by saying that the "band seem to be more concerned with the process of creating music, rather than the music itself" and that "Brian Eno's "treatments" on the keyboards and at the mixing board, Fear would be an intolerable album. He concluded with "Have they redefined New Wave to what is little more than poetic cacaphony? Let's hope not – it's simply doesn't work as a musical expression".

In retrospective reviews, AllMusic's William Ruhlmann felt that Fear of Music was "an uneven, transitional album", but nonetheless stated that it includes songs that match the quality of the band's best works. In the 1995 Spin Alternative Record Guide, Jeff Salamon called it Talking Heads' most musically varied offering. In a 2003 review, Chris Smith of Stylus Magazine praised Byrne's personas and Eno's stylized production techniques. In The Rough Guide to Rock published the same year, Andy Smith concluded that the album is a strong candidate for the best LP of the 1970s because it is "bristling with hooks, riffs and killer lines". The English music critic Simon Reynolds wrote that Fear of Music finds the band "plunged deeper into white funkadelia, but the feel is decidedly late seventies–psychedelia as media-overloaded disorientation, not trippy serenity."

=== Commercial ===
Fear of Music was certified gold by Recording Industry Association of America (RIAA) on September 17, 1985, after more than 500,000 copies were sold in the U.S.

=== Accolades ===
Fear of Music was named as the best album of 1979 by NME, Melody Maker, and the Los Angeles Times. The New York Times included it on its unnumbered shortlist of the 10 best records issued that year. Sounds placed the album at number two on its "Best of 1979" staff list, behind the Specials' eponymous debut studio album. It placed fourth in the 1979 Pazz & Jop critics' poll run by The Village Voice, which aggregates the votes of hundreds of prominent reviewers.

In 1985, NME placed Fear of Music at number 68 on its writers' list of the "All Time 100 Albums". In 1987, Rolling Stone placed it at number 94 on its list of the best albums of the previous 20 years. In 1999, it was included at number 33 on The Guardian's list of the "Top 100 Albums That Don't Appear in All the Other Top 100 Albums of All Time". In 2004, Pitchfork featured the record at number 31 on its "Top 100 Albums of the 1970s" list, while in 2005, Channel 4 ranked it at number 76 during its "100 Greatest Albums" countdown, in which Byrne suggested that the album is "not music you would use to get a girl into bed. If anything, you're going to frighten her off". The album was also included in the book 1001 Albums You Must Hear Before You Die (2006).

== Track listing ==
All tracks are written by David Byrne, except where noted.

Side one
No.	Title	Writer(s)	Length
1.	"I Zimbra"	Byrne; Brian Eno; Hugo Ball	3:09
2.	"Mind"		4:13
3.	"Paper"		2:39
4.	"Cities"		4:10
5.	"Life During Wartime"	Byrne; Chris Frantz; Jerry Harrison; Tina Weymouth	3:41
6.	"Memories Can't Wait"	Byrne; Harrison	3:30

Side two
No.	Title	Writer(s)	Length
1.	"Air"		3:34
2.	"Heaven"	Byrne; Harrison	4:01
3.	"Animals"		3:30
4.	"Electric Guitar"		3:03
5.	"Drugs"	Byrne; Eno	5:10
Total length:			40:40

- The original LP issue credited all songs to David Byrne, except "I Zimbra". After complaints from other band members, the credits were changed to the above on later CD issues.
- A limited edition UK LP included a live version of "Psycho Killer" and "New Feeling" from Talking Heads: 77 (1977) on a bonus 7-inch record.

Expanded CD reissue bonus tracks
No.	Title	Writer(s)	Length
12.	"Dancing for Money" (Unfinished outtake)		2:42
13.	"Life During Wartime" (Alternate version)	Byrne; Frantz; Harrison; Weymouth	4:07
14.	"Cities" (Alternate version)		5:30
15.	"Mind" (Alternate version)		4:26

- The remastered reissue was produced by Andy Zax, with the help of Talking Heads, and was mixed by Brian Kehew.
- The DVD portion of the European reissue contains videos of the band performing "I Zimbra" and "Cities" on German music show Rockpop in 1980.

== Personnel ==
Those involved in the making of Fear of Music were:

Talking Heads

- David Byrne – vocals, guitars
- Jerry Harrison – guitar, vocals, keyboards
- Tina Weymouth – bass guitar, vocals
- Chris Frantz – drums, percussion

Additional musicians

- Brian Eno – electronic treatments, synthesizers, piano, guitars, vocals
- Gene Wilder – congas (tracks 1, 5)
- Ari – congas (tracks 1, 5)
- Robert Fripp – guitar (track 1 & "Life During Wartime" (Alternate version))
- The Sweetbreathes (Lani Weymouth, Laura Weymouth, Tina Weymouth) – backing vocals (track 7)
- Julie Last – backing vocals (track 1)
- Hassam Ramzy – surdo (track 1)
- Abdou M'Boup – djembe, talking drum (track 1)
- Assane Thiam – percussion (track 1)

The birds on "Drugs" were recorded at Lone Pine Koala Sanctuary (Brisbane, Australia)

Technical

- Brian Eno – producer
- Talking Heads – producers
- Rod O'Brien – engineer
- Dave Hewitt – engineering crew
- Fred Ridder – engineering crew
- Phil Gitomer – engineering crew
- Kooster McAllister – engineering crew
- Joe Barbaria – engineer
- Chris Martinez – assistant engineer
- Tom Heid – assistant engineer
- Neal Teeman – engineer
- Julie Last – assistant engineer
- Greg Calbi – mastering
- Jerry Harrison – cover concept
- Jimmy Garcia – thermograph (heat sensitive photo)
- Dr. Philip Strax – thermograph
- David Byrne – concept
- Spencer Drate – cover/inner sleeve typography design

== Charts ==
Chart performance for Fear of Music
Chart (1979)	Peak position
Australian Albums (Kent Music Report)	35
Canadian Albums (RPM)	27
New Zealand Albums (RMNZ)	11
UK Albums (OCC)	33
US Billboard 200	21

Chart (2020)	Peak position
Hungarian Albums (MAHASZ)	24

Chart (2026)	Peak position
Belgian Albums (Ultratop Flanders)	42
Belgian Albums (Ultratop Wallonia)	200

== Certifications and sales ==
Certifications and sales for Fear of Music
Region	Certification	Certified units/sales
United Kingdom (BPI) 2006 release	Silver	60,000^{‡}
United States (RIAA)	Gold	500,000^{^}
^{^} Shipments figures based on certification alone.^{‡} Sales+streaming figures based on certification alone.

== Release history ==
Release formats for Fear of Music
Region	Year	Label	Format(s)	Catalog
United States and Canada	1979	Sire Records	LP, cassette	6076
United Kingdom	1979	Sire Records	LP, cassette	6076
Rest of Europe	1979	WEA	LP, cassette	56707
United States and Canada	1984	Sire Records	CD	(2–)6076
Europe	1984	Sire Records	CD	(2–)6076
United States and Canada	2006	Rhino Records	Expanded CD, digital download	76451
Europe	2006	Warner	Expanded CD, digital download	8122732992
Japan	2009	Warner	Expanded CD, digital download	WPCR-13291

== Bibliography ==
- Bowman, David (2001). This Must Be the Place: The Adventures of Talking Heads in the Twentieth Century. HarperCollins. ISBN 0-380-97846-6.
- Charone, Barbara (October 1979). "More Songs About Typing and Vacuuming". Creem. pp. 27–33.
