= Jacob Wit =

Dutch jurist (1952–2024)

Jacob Wit (24 December 1952 – 16 January 2024) was a Dutch jurist who was justice of the Caribbean Court of Justice, and located in Trinidad and Tobago. Beginning in 2010 he also served as the president of the Constitutional Court of Sint Maarten, and was once a judge of the Rotterdam District Court and the Common Court of Justice of the Netherlands Antilles and Aruba.

== Early life and legal career ==
Wit was born on 24 December 1952 in Haarlemmermeer, Netherlands. He graduated from the Pius X Lyceum (Amsterdam) in 1971, entering in that same year the Vrije Universiteit (Free University) of Amsterdam, from which he took the degree of Master of Laws with honours in 1977. After completing his military service (1976–1978) as a Second Lieutenant in the Royal Dutch Navy. Wit was admitted in March 1978 as a judicial trainee at the Studiecentrum Rechtspleging (Training and Study Centre for the Judiciary) in Zutphen, where he remained until 1984. During this period, he held the posts of law clerk in the Rotterdam District Court, Rotterdam, (1978–1980) and deputy prosecutor at the Amsterdam District Court (1980–1982) and worked as an attorney-at-law with the law firm of Van Doorne & Sjollema in Rotterdam.

== Judicial career ==
Wit was appointed deputy judge of the Rotterdam District Court in January 1984, judge of the Netherlands Antilles and Aruba on 1 October 1986 where he functioned as coordinating judge, Court of First Instance, Curaçao (1993–1996); coordinating judge of instruction, Netherlands Antilles (1994–1997); coordinating judge for the Dutch Windward Islands of Sint Maarten, Sint Eustatius and Saba and from 2001 to 2005 as senior justice and acting chief justice.

Wit took the oath of office as a judge of the Caribbean Court of Justice (CCJ) at the President's House Port of Spain, on Wednesday 1 June 2005. In November 2010, Wit was appointed and sworn in as the president of the Constitutional Court of Sint Maarten, a part-time function.

== Death ==
Wit died on 16 January 2024, at the age of 71.
