= Association of University of New Brunswick Teachers =

AUNBT
- Association of University of New Brunswick Teachers
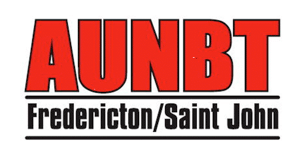
- Founded: 1956
- Headquarters: Fredericton, New Brunswick
- Location: Canada
- Members: 1,000
- Key people: Melissa White, president
- Affiliations: CAUT
- Website: www.aunbt.ca

The Association of University of New Brunswick Teachers (AUNBT) is the trade union representing the full-time and part-time professors, instructors, and academic librarians at the University of New Brunswick in the province of New Brunswick, Canada. Established in 1956 as a faculty association, AUNBT joined the Canadian Association of University Teachers (CAUT) that same year. In 1979 the organization was certified by the Industrial Relations Board as the bargaining agent for full-time academic staff, both faculty and librarians, at the two principal campuses of UNB. The first collective agreement came into effect in 1980.

In 2007 the Association organized contract academics and in 2008 achieved certification for part-time faculty and librarians under the NB Labour and Employment Board. Throughout this same period the organization was involved in opposing a proposal by the provincial government under Premier Shawn Graham to replace three university campuses with polytechnic institutes.

On January 13, 2014, AUNBT went on strike; they were locked out the following day. This was the first job action in the organization's history and it lasted three weeks, until February 1, 2014.

Melissa White, Faculty of Education, Fredericton Campus, is the current president of the Association.

AUNBT is a member of the CAUT, the Federation of New Brunswick Faculty Associations (FNBFA), and the New Brunswick Federation of Labour (NBFL).
