= James Owen Dineen =

Canadian engineer & university administrator (1920–1975)

12th President of the University of New Brunswick
- In office 1969–1972
- Preceded by: Colin B. Mackay
- Succeeded by: Desmond Pacey (acting)

Personal details
- Born: July 24, 1920 Hampton, New Brunswick, Canada
- Died: September 21, 1975 (aged 55) Fredericton, New Brunswick, Canada

James Owen Dineen (July 24, 1920 – September 21, 1975) was a Canadian engineer, university administrator and the twelfth President of the University of New Brunswick.

Born in Hampton, New Brunswick, he graduated from the Hampton Consolidated School in 1936. At the age of 16 he entered the University of New Brunswick, having been awarded a Beaverbrook Scholarship. Dineen graduated with a Bachelor of Science degree in Electrical Engineering in 1940. He was awarded a Rhodes Scholarship to the University of Oxford but was unable to take it up because of the Second World War. Instead of going to Oxford he went to the University of Toronto with a Leonard Fellowship subsequently taking a position as a radio instructor in Hamilton, Ontario. He returned to the University of New Brunswick to instruct airmen and sailors at the UNB Radio School.

Dineen was appointed assistant professor of Electrical Engineering in 1942, Associate Professor in 1946 and Professor and Head of the Department of Electrical Engineering in 1951. In 1957 he became Dean of the Faculty of Engineering. Research and graduate programs were strongly encouraged by Dineen in the Electrical Engineering Department and in the Faculty of Engineering as a whole.

He was appointed as Acting President of the university in 1969 succeeding Colin B. Mackay. On January 1, 1970, he was appointed as the 12th President of the University of New Brunswick for a 6-year term. Ill health forced him to relinquish that position in September 1972. He died three years later. Dineen's presidency was notable for his commitment to an open and collegial approach, integrity, and leadership. He won wide respect among faculty members and students.

The Engineering Institute of Canada elected Dineen as a Fellow in 1971 and in 1974 it awarded him the Julian C. Smith medal in recognition of his contributions to engineering in Canada. He received honorary doctoral degrees from five Canadian universities: McMaster University 1968; St. Thomas University (New Brunswick) 1970; University of New Brunswick 1970; Université de Moncton 1972; Nova Scotia Technical College 1973. He was made an Honorary Member of the Canadian Institute of Surveying (now Canadian Institute of Geomatics) in 1974. He was awarded the Canadian Centennial Medal in 1967.
