= University Women's Club of Toronto =

Canadian organization

Coordinates: 43.667070°N 79.400028°W

The University Women’s Club of Toronto
- Abbreviation: UWC
- Formation: 1903
- Type: Women's educational organizations in Canada
- Legal status: active
- Headquarters: 41 Willcocks Street (c/o The Faculty Club)
- Region served: Toronto, Ontario, Canada
- Official language: English, French
- Parent organization: Canadian Federation of University Women
- Website: www.uwctoronto.ca

The University Women's Club of Toronto is a Canadian organization that was founded in 1903 to promote women's education. Its parent organization is Canadian Federation of University Women.

== History ==
The University Women's Club of Toronto was founded in 1903 by 22 women from seven universities, to promote women's education. They raised funds for scholarships, and provided a networking and social opportunity for women graduates.

They also organised campaigns on behalf of women, such as in 1907 when King's College Law School graduate Mabel French was refused entrance to the New Brunswick bar. This led to the Legislative Assembly of New Brunswick passing "An Act to Remove the Disability of Women so far as Relates to the Study and Practice of the Law".

Margaret Robertson Watt from the Women's Institute in England spoke to the club in 1919 about her work. In 1921, the club's vice-president, May Skinner, delivered an address to Marie Curie, at the Canadian Federation at a meeting in Niagara Falls. In 1922, the club sent 22 delegates to an international meeting of university women's clubs in Paris.

In 1929, the club began planning for a new clubhouse location; they bought a mansion later that year, at 162 St. George Street. The club hosted prominent speakers and celebrated women's academic achievement, for example when it honored paleontologist Madeleine Fritz in 1940, after she became a fellow of the Geological Society of America.

The club sold its building on St. George Street in 2010, and began using the Faculty Club at the University of Toronto as its meeting space. The club marked its 120th year in 2023.
