= Willem van Schendel (jurist) =

Dutch jurist (1950–2024)

Willem A. M. van Schendel (28 August 1950 – 8 February 2024) was a Dutch jurist. He was vice president on the Supreme Court of the Netherlands from 2012 until 2020.

== Life and career ==
Willem A. M. van Schendel was born in The Hague on 28 August 1950. His father was a civil servant at the Ministry of Economic Affairs. He had two brothers. Van Schendel studied law at Leiden University. He became a judge at age 33. From 1988 to 2001 he was justice at the court of appeal of Amsterdam. From 21 November 2001 until 1 January 2012 he was justice (Dutch: raadsheer) at the Supreme Court of the Netherlands. From 1 January 2012 until 1 September 2020, he was vice president of the Supreme Court. In this position, he was talented in finding compromises in cases where there was no actual compromise to be found between guilty and not-guilty. He did this by adding small sentences to the judgement so that all justices could consent to the judgement. As Vice President of the Supreme Court, he also presided over the trial regarding the Murder of Anne Faber. Having retired in September 2020, he was made substitute justice at Joint Court of Justice of Aruba, Curaçao, Sint Maarten, and of Bonaire, Sint Eustatius and Saba in December 2022 to help with the backlog of civil cases.

Van Schendel died unexpectedly in Amsterdam, on 8 February 2024, at the age of 73.
