= Pieter van Dijk =

Dutch legal scholar and judge (born 1943)

Member of the Council of State
- In office 1 June 1990 – 1 March 2013

Vice president of the Constitutional Court of Sint Maarten
- In office 1 September 2010 – 1 March 2013
- Succeeded by: B. Vermeulen

Judge of the European Court of Human Rights
- In office July 1996 – 1998

Personal details
- Born: Petrus van Dijk; 21 February 1943 (age 83) De Lier, Netherlands
- Education: Utrecht University
- Occupation: Legal scholar, judge

Petrus "Pieter" van Dijk (born 21 February 1943) is a Dutch legal scholar and judge. After being a professor of law of international organizations at Utrecht University between 1976 and 1990 Van Dijk served in multiple judicial positions. He was member of the Dutch Council of State from 1990 until 2013, but also was judge at the European Court of Human Rights (1996–1998) and vice president of the Constitutional Court of Sint Maarten (2010–2013).

== Life ==
Van Dijk was born on 21 February 1943 in De Lier. After attending the gymnasium he obtained a degree in Dutch law at Utrecht University. From 1967 to 1976 Van Dijk worked as a scientific employee at the Europa Institute of Utrecht University. He obtained his PhD under Paul Joan George Kapteyn in 1976 with a thesis titled: "Toetsing van overheidshandelen door de nationale en internationale rechter en het vereiste van een procesbelang. Rechtsvergelijkende studies terzake van het procesbelang in het nationale, Europese en volkenrecht". From 1 August 1976 until 1 June 1990 he was professor of law of international organisations at the same university. For the latter half of 1990 he held a temporary position as regular professor of law.

Van Dijk was appointed a member of the Council of State per 1 June 1990. From April 2001 until 2003 Van Dijk was chair its administrative jurisdiction division. He held this position again between November 2006 and 1 May 2010. Van Dijk's membership of the Council of State ended on 1 March 2013. While member of the Council of State Van Dijk had also served as judge at the European Court of Human Rights from July 1996 until 1998. From 1 September 2010 until 1 March 2013 he, also concurrently with his membership of the Council of State, served as vice president of the Constitutional Court of Sint Maarten. Van Dijk was the first vice president of a constitional court of the Kingdom of the Netherlands. He had to retire due to age restrictions and was succeeded by B. Vermeulen.

Van Dijk was elected a member of the Royal Netherlands Academy of Arts and Sciences in 1982. In 1989 he became a member of the Academia Europaea.

Van Dijk also served on the Venice Commission, he was a member and between 2003 and 2005 vice president. After Dutch member of parliament Pieter Omtzigt in 2021 proposed to have the Venice Commission look into Dutch administrative law Van Dijk called the request extraordinary, but laudible for the Netherlands to self-reflect.
