= Zoila Martínez =

Dominican Republic lawyer (born 1941)

The Honourable Zoila Martínez

1st Ombudsman of the Dominican Republic
- In office 29 May 2013 – 14 June 2021
- Deputy: Carlos Hernández Cabrera
- Preceded by: office created
- Succeeded by: Pablo Ulloa

Prosecutor of the National District

Dominican Republic Ambassador to the Republic of Korea

Personal details
- Born: Zoila Violeta Martínez Guante; 13 July 1941 (age 85) la isabela, Santo Domingo, Dominican Republic
- Party: resigned from Social Christian Reformist Party after its leader Joaquin Balaguer died
- Children: César, Diógenes, Flor, Zoila Medina Martínez
- Parents: Joaquin Martinez Acevedo (father); Marina Caridad Guante (mother)
- Education: UASD
- Profession: Lawyer
- Awards: (Dominican Republic) Order of Merit of Duarte, Sánchez and Mella: Grand Cross with Silver Breast Star; (South Korea) Order of Diplomatic Service Merit: Gwanghwa Medal, 1st Class

Zoila V. Martínez Guante is a lawyer, prosecutor and diplomat from the Dominican Republic.

Martínez Guante graduated as Juris Doctor in 1967.

Martínez was prosecutor attorney of the National District, and ambassador to the Republic of Korea (South Korea). As prosecutor, she was part of the investigation team that probed the murder of José Rafael Llenas Aybar in 1996. She was the Ombudsman of the Dominican Republic from 29 May 2013 to 14 June 2021 when she was succeeded by Pablo Ulloa.

Martínez has been awarded by the Republic of Korea with the Order of Diplomatic Service Merit's Gwanghwa Medal, and by her own country with the Order of Merit of Duarte, Sánchez and Mella's Grand Cross with Silver Breast Star.

== See also ==
- List of first women lawyers and judges in North America
