= Norma Maynard-Marshall =

Norma E. Maynard-Marshall is a lawyer practising in Trinidad and Tobago. She became the first woman admitted to practice in Barbados in January 1962.

She was born Norma Maynard in Barbados and articled with the firm of Haynes and Griffith from 1955 to 1961. In December 1961, she received final certification from the Law Society of England and Wales and was admitted to practice in January the following year. She practised with Haynes and Griffith until June 1964. She married Rupert Marshall and soon afterwards moved to Trinidad. She practised there as a legal assistant from 1965 to 1973 with the firm Laurence Narinesingh and Co.; she was finally admitted to practice in Trinidad and Tobago in December 1973. She opened her own law practice in 1975. In 2012, she was named Senior Counsel for Trinidad and Tobago.

== See also ==
- First women lawyers around the world
