= Ianthea Leigertwood-Octave =

Former High Court Judge of the Eastern Caribbean Supreme Court

Judge of the Eastern Caribbean Supreme Court
- In office 2006 – 1 September 2014

Personal details
- Education: University of the West Indies (LLB)

Ianthea Leigertwood-Octave is a Vincentian jurist, who was judge of the Eastern Caribbean Supreme Court with jurisdiction over St. Kitts and Nevis, serving from 2006 to 2014.
