= Federation of New Brunswick Faculty Associations =

Librarian organization in Canada

The Federation of New Brunswick Faculty Associations (FNBFA) is the voice of university faculty and academic librarians across the province of New Brunswick, Canada. They seek to advance their members’ professional interests and to improve the quality of the education system. The FNBFA represents 1,800 regular and contract academics through its six member associations.

The President and Vice-President are Hector Guy Adégbidi and Lacina Coulibaly respectively.

== Scholarship ==
In 1990, the FNBFA created the FNBFA Semeluk Scholarship in honor of Dr. George Peter Semeluk. Dr. Semeluk was the founding member and leading volunteer of the FNBFA and over a 30-year span, he held several positions. The FNBFA Semeluk Scholarship is intended to preserve the memory of his service and his role as a worthy model for students and faculty members. The FNBFA Semeluk Scholarship is a four- or five-year renewable scholarship, awarded annually to a student enrolled in a bachelor's program at a New Brunswick university. The amount of the scholarship is $5,000 yearly during a continuous course of studies leading to an undergraduate degree. The scholarship is renewable as long as the student is enrolled at a New Brunswick university and maintains a B+ average. The selection criteria are excellence and the financial need of the candidate. The seven university campuses of the province each nominate two candidates – one male, one female – from which the Scholarship Awards Committee selects the winner.
