= Mabel French =

Canadian lawyer and women's rights activist

Mabel Priscilla Penery French BCL (4 June 1881 – 13 January 1955) was a Canadian lawyer and women's rights pioneer. She was the first woman to practice law in two separate Canadian provinces: New Brunswick and British Columbia.

== Life ==
She was born in Portland Parish, New Brunswick, the daughter of Henry Steeves French, a city constable; and Ruth Penery.

French graduated from King's College Law School, (then located in Saint John, New Brunswick), with a Bachelor of Civil Law degree in 1905, becoming the first woman in New Brunswick to receive that degree. When she sought entrance to the New Brunswick bar, she was refused, as legally she was not a person and therefore, not entitled to practise law. William Henry Tuck was opposed to her admission. To protest this decision, she stopped paying her bills. Upon being sued for debt, her defence was that since she was not a person, she could not be sued, nor did she have to pay. Her defence failed, although she was ruled as a person and British subject.

In 1907, due to pressure from women, including a campaign by the Canadian University Women's Club, the Legislative Assembly of New Brunswick passed "An Act to Remove the Disability of Women so far as Relates to the Study and Practice of the Law". French was then admitted to the New Brunswick bar on April 1.

French practised law in Saint John as partner in the firm Bustin & French, alongside Stephen Bustin, often arguing in her cases that as women were not persons under the law, they could not be convicted under that law. She also presented a paper to the ICW regarding child custody and the law and assisted in drafting the 1909 women's suffrage bill.

She moved to Vancouver, British Columbia in 1910. The Law Society of British Columbia at that time excluded women, but she won the right to enter after applying to the Supreme Court of British Columbia for a writ of mandamus, in 1912 to compel the society to accept her application. When it was refused, she appealed. Although Chief Justice James Alexander MacDonald was sympathetic, he ruled that British Columbia should follow the custom of England, which at the time (Note: Women were not allowed to practise law in England until 1921.) did not allow women to practise. A similarly named act was passed by the Conservative government a short time later, just before the 1912 election.

After the act was passed, French left the firm Russell, Russell & Hannington and set up a single practice in Vancouver in 1913. The next year, she emigrated from Canada and moved to Britain, along with one of the partners in her former firm.

== Personal life ==
In 1923, she married Hugh Travis Clay, a worsted manufacturer. They moved to live in St. Helier, Jersey, Channel Islands. She died there on 13 January 1955, at home.

== See also ==
- Frances Fish - first woman to be called to the bar of Nova Scotia
