= Constitutional Court of Sint Maarten =

Constitutional Court in Sint Maarten

Constitutioneel Hof Constitutional Court
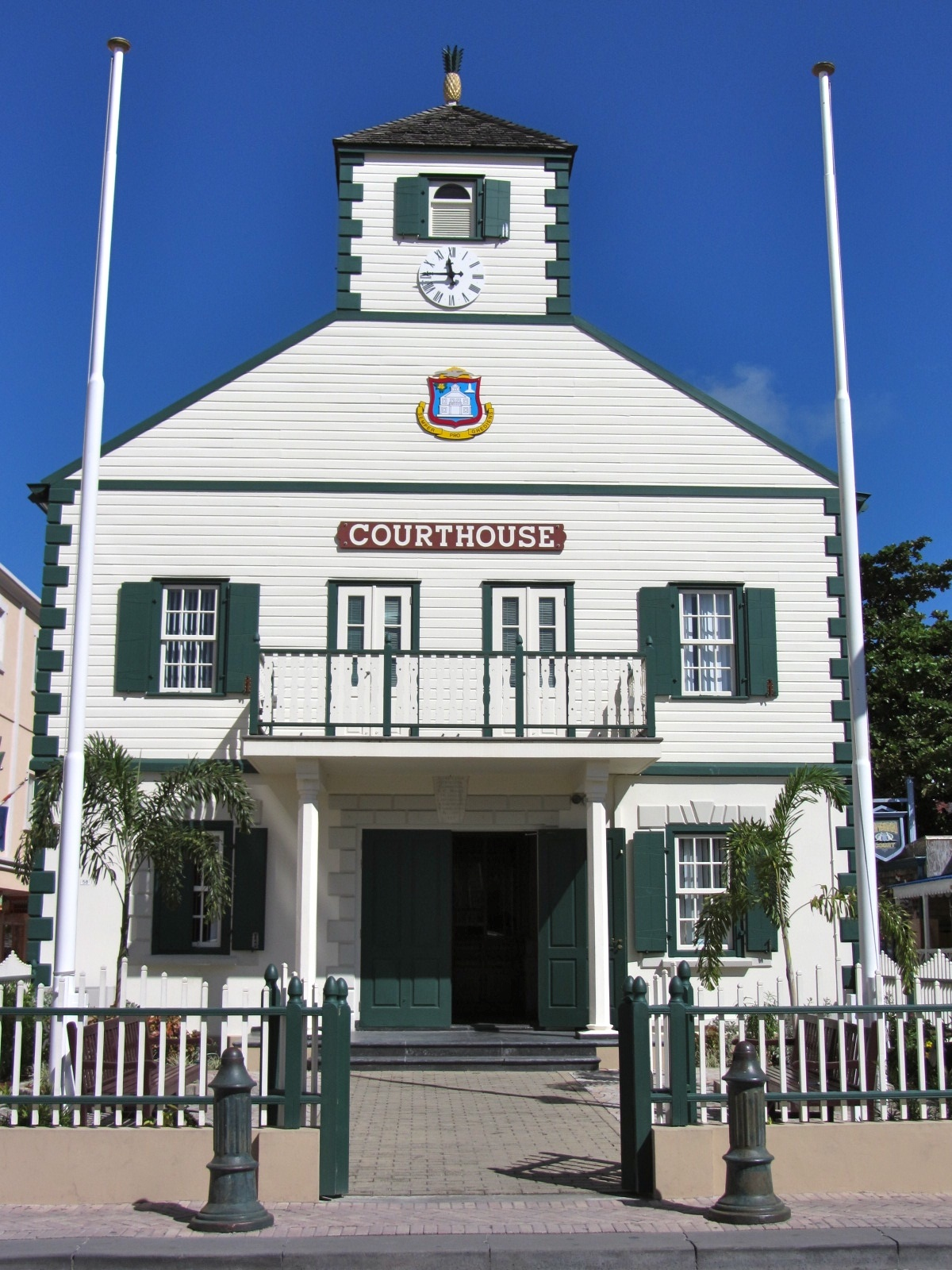
- Courthouse, where the first two cases took place
- Interactive map of Constitutioneel Hof; Constitutional Court
- 18°01′26″N 63°02′45″W
- Established: 2010
- Jurisdiction: Sint Maarten
- Coordinates: 18°01′26″N 63°02′45″W
- Composition method: Governmental appointment, after consultation/nomination
- Authorised by: Constitution of Sint Maarten
- Judge term length: 10 years (renewable once)
- Number of positions: 3
- Currently: Unknown
- Since: 17 November 2010

The Constitutional Court of Sint Maarten (Dutch: Constitutioneel hof van Sint Maarten) is a court of Sint Maarten. As a constitutional court it evaluates the constitutionality of the provisions of legislation which is approved by the Estates of Sint Maarten and signed into law, but which has not entered into force. Procedures by the court may be initiated only by the ombudsman of Sint Maarten. As of July 2016, the court has decided two cases. Sint Maarten is the only country in the Kingdom of the Netherlands with a constitutional court.

== Legal basis ==
The National ordinance Constitutional Court (Dutch: Landsverordening Constitutioneel Hof) forms the legal basis for the constitutional court. It was approved by the Island Council of Sint Maarten before Sint Maarten obtained the status of country within the Kingdom as part of the dissolution of the Netherlands Antilles and entered into force when Sint Maarten obtained that status on 10 October 2010.

== Judges ==
The court consists of 3 judges (and 3 deputy judges) which are appointed for a 10-year term, which may be renewed once. The Council of State of the Kingdom of the Netherlands, the Common Court of Justice of Aruba, Curaçao, Sint Maarten, and of Bonaire, Saint Eustatius and Saba each nominate one of their judges as a member and deputy member of the court. The third member and deputy member is appointed after hearing the Constitutional Court.

Initially judges who reached the age of 70 were dismissed. As replacement was hard to find (Note: See Memorie van Toelichting.) that age was raised to 75 on 20 July 2021. So that on 12 August 2021 mr. Jan de Boer could be reappointed.

Members of the court are:

Name	Term start	Term end	Position	Main position
Jacob Wit	2010		President	Caribbean Court of Justice
Pieter van Dijk	2010	2013	Vice-president	Council of State of the Netherlands
Jan de Boer	2010, 2021			Common Court of Justice of Aruba, Curaçao, Sint Maarten, and of Bonaire, Saint Eustatius and Saba
Ben Vermeulen	2013			Council of State of the Netherlands

== Cases ==
As of January 2018, 2 cases have been brought before the court by Ombudsman Rachnilda (Nilda) J.A. Arduin, who has been ombudsman of the country since its inception.

=== Case 2013/1: Criminal Code ===
A complete recast of the Criminal Code was approved in 2012 and the ombudsman requested evaluation of the Act in January 2013. As this was the first case of the court, in its decision ECLI:NL:OCHM:2013:3 it first laid down certain points of departure regarding its evaluation consisting of 5 points:

- The court needs to evaluate acts only on those points about which the Ombudsman raises concerns.
- The court should exercise judicial restraint, especially when multiple interpretations are concerned.
- A presumption of constitutionality exists: when the act can be interpreted in a way that is constitutional, then it will follow that interpretation.
- The court should follow a "practical" and "effective" approach.
- The provisions of the constitution should be interpreted in the light of relevant provisions of the European Convention on Human Rights that they are based on, interpreted consistently with the case law of the European Court of Human Rights (ECHR). The same goes for provisions that derive from the Constitution of the Netherlands.

The Ombudsman had made seven complaints regarding the law, which were dealt with in ECLI:NL:OCHM:2013:2

1. The promulgation date was not recorded, which made it hard to identify the start of the 6-week period that the Ombudsman has to file complaints with the court. This complaint was considered well-founded.
2. The provisions of the code were renumbered following several amendments during the legislative process without a proper mandate to do so. This complaint was held to be well-founded.
3. Animal fights. The code allowed animal fights as part of a cultural expression. The court held that such a provision was not a priori unconstitutional.
4. Higher maximum penalties for theft from tourists. The court held the complaint unfounded as legitimate reasons existed for these penalties.
5. Life without parole. The code did not provide any provision for parole for people convicted for life (Dutch: levenslange gevangenisstraf and the government explained that also no informal parole system existed. The court found such a penalty (without a "possibility for review" with a "prospect of release") inhuman in line with ECHR case law.
6. Different treatment of residents and non-residents, as the first could not qualify for release on licence. This complaint was held to be well-founded.
7. Legalization of prostitution. The court held that this was not a priori unconstitutional.

Thus the Court held complaints 1, 2, 5, and 6 to be well founded. It decided not to annul the ordinance as a whole but to annul only the provisions related to life without parole and release on licence.

=== Case 2015/1: Integrity Chamber Ordinance ===
The National Ordinance for the establishment of the Integrity Chamber was approved by the Parliament of Sint Maarten, after considerable pressure from the Netherlands. The Chamber was to investigate and act upon possible violations of public integrity.

The ombudsman complained that a very substantial change had not been submitted to the Council of Advice for additional advice. The court held that the change was indeed sufficiently large to require such advice. Based on fundamental problems regarding the constitutionality of the act, in part because of the changes introduced, they Court annulled the act as a whole and laid down the requirements that a possible new act would have to fulfill. These requirements included:

- Warranties for competence, independence and mandate of a supervisory organization of the integrity chamber
- Warranties for the right to be heard of people also subject to criminal investigation
- Hearing persons under oath or the possibility of a penalty payment in case of non-compliance with a request should not be possible if parallel criminal proceedings are ongoing
- Clarity should be given about the transfer of findings from the integrity chamber to criminal investigators, and about the right not to incriminate oneself
- The use of search warrants should be properly supervised
