= Patricia Cole Cozzi =

Bahamian lawyer

Patricia Cole Cozzi (ca 1926 – April 8, 2006) was the first female lawyer in The Bahamas.

The daughter of A.K. Cole, Controller of Customs, she was born Patricia Marjorie Cole and was educated at Queen's College in Nassau and studied law at Victoria College in Toronto. She completed her legal studies at the Middle Temple in London and was called to the English bar. She was called to the Bahamian bar on July 11, 1953. She practised criminal and company law. She later moved to Dorchester in England; she worked with Inland Revenue there.

She married Enrico Cozzi in 1951.

Cozzi died in Dorchester after a brief illness at the age of 80.

== See also ==
- First women lawyers around the world
