= Sylvia Judith Bertrand =

Dominican civil servant

- Born: 1930; Portsmouth, Dominica
- Died: 2009 (aged 78–79); Roseau, Dominica
- Other names: Sylvia Bertrand
- Occupation(s): civil servant, judge
- Years active: 1956–1996
- Known for: first woman Solicitor General of Dominica and first woman judge of St. Vincent & the Grenadines

Sylvia Judith Bertrand (1930 – 7 June 2009) was a Dominican civil servant who went on to earn a law degree in Dominica and serve as the Director of Public Prosecution. She served as Solicitor General for Dominica and later as High Court Judge for Antigua and Barbuda, Saint Vincent and the Grenadines, and the British Virgin Islands on the Eastern Caribbean Supreme Court.

== Early life ==
Sylvia Judith Bertrand was born in 1930 in Portsmouth, Dominica to Octavia (née Savarin) and Tyrill Bertrand. After attending primary school in Portsmouth, she attended Convent High School in Roseau, where she excelled at sports. She participated on the National Netball Team and was one of the founders in 1950 of the Dominica Netball Club.

== Career ==
In 1956, Bertrand began working as a court reporter in the colonial civil service. She worked on several Inquiry Commissions, including the 1958 Carnival Day murders in La Plaine and the 1963 Carnival Day fire. Her work encouraged her to seek further education in her field and in 1965, she resigned and moved to England where she resided with her older brother Hubert, to seek a law degree. Upon completion of her studies, Bertrand returned to Dominica and on 4 October 1969, was admitted to the bar to practice law in Dominica.

In 1980, with the election of Eugenia Charles as Prime Minister of Dominica, Bertrand, who was serving at the time as Director of Public Prosecution, became involved in the prosecution of the various forces involved in the coup d'états against Charles' administration. Her successful prosecution of the involved parties, resulted in Bertrand's elevation as the Solicitor General of Dominica in 1982. The first woman to hold the post, she served until 1984, when she was assigned as a puisne judge in Saint Vincent and the Grenadines, becoming the first female judge of Saint Vincent.

Bertrand was confirmed in 1985 as the High Court Judge representing Antigua and Barbuda, Saint Vincent and the Grenadines, and the British Virgin Islands for the Eastern Caribbean Supreme Court. Serving for seven years, she retired in 1992 and then returned to Dominica, where she served as Chair of the Social Security Board from 1994 to 1996.

== Death and legacy ==
Bertrand died on 7 June 2009 at Princess Margaret Hospital in Roseau, Dominica. Bertrand's niece, Karyl Bertrand, daughter of her brother Hubert, is a commercial attorney of note in Curaçao.

== See also ==
- First women lawyers around the world
