= Colin B. Mackay =

Colin B. Mackay OC QC

President of the University of New Brunswick
- In office 1953–1969
- Preceded by: C. W. Argue (acting)
- Succeeded by: James Owen Dineen

Personal details
- Born: July 26, 1920 Rothesay, New Brunswick, Canada
- Died: November 27, 2003 (aged 83)

Colin Bridges Mackay (July 26, 1920 – November 27, 2003) was president of the University of New Brunswick in Fredericton, New Brunswick, Canada from 1953 to 1969.

Mackay oversaw the expansion of the university from a small college to a regional institution, including a fivefold increase in enrollment, and major construction of residences, academic and multipurpose buildings.

In 1970, he was made an Officer of the Order of Canada "for his services to education".

Upon his death on November 27, 2003, at the age of 83, a bequest of $6-million was left to the Law Library at University of New Brunswick Faculty of Law and the scholarship and bursary programme at University of New Brunswick Saint John.
