= University of New Brunswick Faculty of Law =

Public law school in Fredericton, Canada

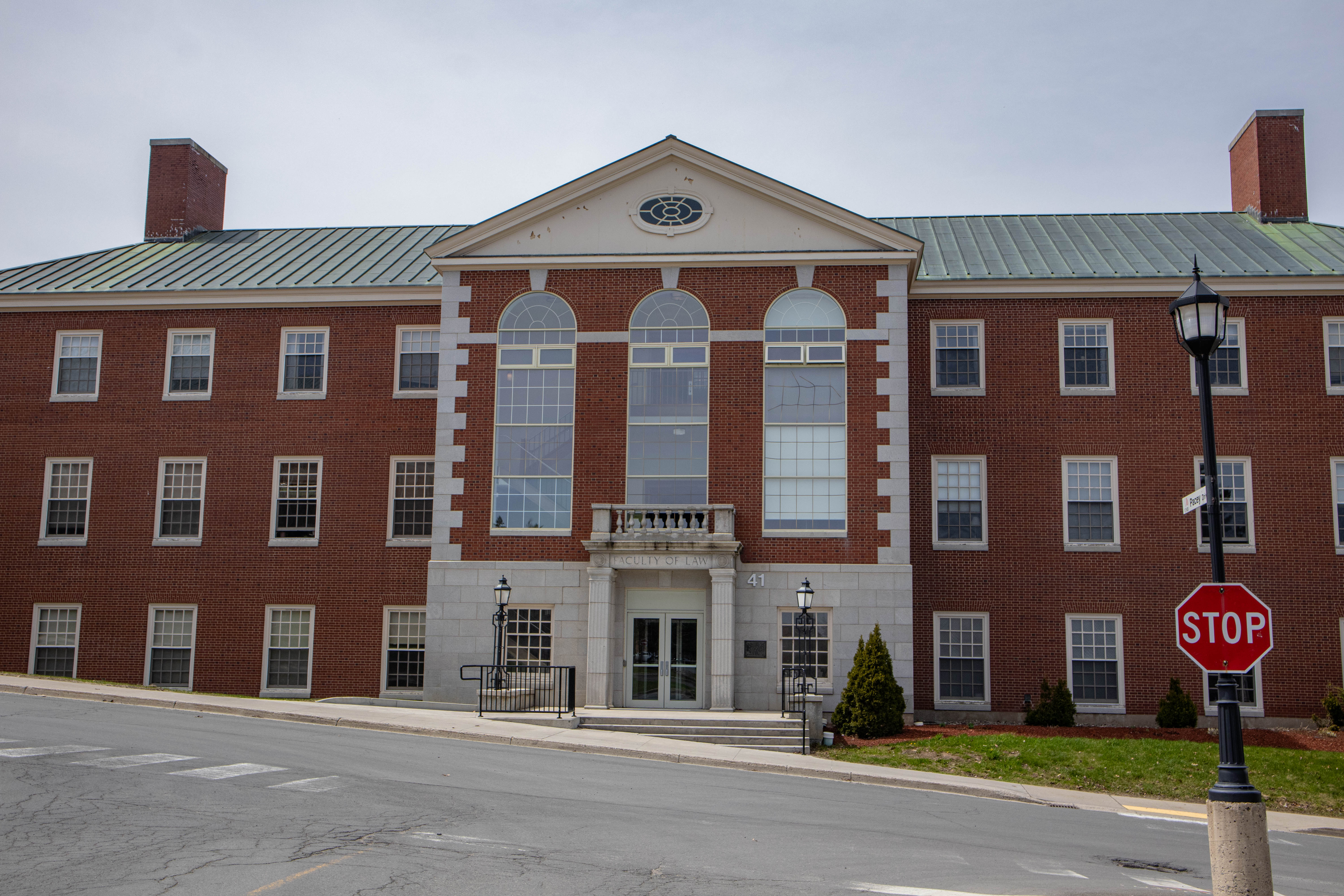
- Faculty of Law building pictured in 2025
- Motto: Legem Defendemus (Latin for 'We Will Defend the Law')
- Parent school: University of New Brunswick
- Established: 1892; 134 years ago
- School type: Public law school
- Parent endowment: $276,505 million CAD
- Dean: Michael Marin
- Location: Fredericton, New Brunswick, Canada; 45°56′46.14″N 66°38′41.29″W
- Enrollment: 265
- Faculty: 61
- Website: www.unb.ca/fredericton/law/
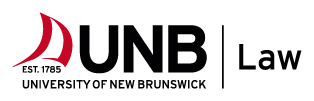

The University of New Brunswick Faculty of Law is the law school of the University of New Brunswick, and is the second oldest university-based common law faculty in the Commonwealth. It is located in New Brunswick's capital city, Fredericton, and is one of two law schools located in the province, the other being the French-language faculty at l'Université de Moncton.

The current dean of the faculty is Professor Michael Marin.

== History ==
=== Establishment and early history ===
In 1892, the King's College Law School was established in Saint John, New Brunswick, in the Provincial Building at the intersection of Princess Street and Canterbury Street in the city's central business district. This building housed the offices of various Provincial civil servants as well as the Saint John Law Society. The parent institution of the King's College Law School was King's College, which was located at that time in Windsor, Nova Scotia. Windsor, a port located on the Bay of Fundy, had developed strong commercial connections with Saint John during the 19th century.

In 1912, the King's College Law School entered into a partnership with the University of New Brunswick in Fredericton, whereby undergraduates in arts at UNB became able to take first-year law courses on the campus in Fredericton. A disastrous fire swept through the King's College campus in Windsor on February 3, 1920, placing the future of the institution in doubt. An offer by the Carnegie Foundation to fund moving King's College from Windsor to Halifax, where it would be located adjacent to and integrated with Dalhousie University, was accepted in 1922; as a result, King's College was renamed as the University of King's College.

These events saw various suggestions made as to the future of the orphaned King's College Law School, still located in Saint John. One option was for the law school to continue to operate in New Brunswick either independently or as a school of the proposed new University of King's College. The latter option proved difficult, given the existence of the Dalhousie University Faculty of Law and the fact that the University of King's College was to have considerable integration with Dalhousie.

Instead, in 1923, the King's College Law School became the University of New Brunswick Faculty of Law. After integration into the UNB system, the law school continued to operate in Saint John much as before, and the 1912 arrangement that had allowed first year students to study law in Fredericton also continued.

=== Beaverbrook's changes ===
In 1948, the newly installed chancellor of the University of New Brunswick, Lord Beaverbrook, who had registered at the King's College Law School in the 1890s but did not attend the institution, registered shock upon seeing the condition of the instructional space used by the law school in Saint John's Provincial Building. Beaverbrook arranged to purchase two buildings on Germain Street and to move the school into new facilities; he also purchased the residence of the late F.P. Starr on Coburg Street with the intention of creating a joint-use reception centre for the law school and the Saint John City Council, however, this plan was subsequently scrapped.

Prior to 1950, the UNB Faculty of Law had only one professor of law on its campus in downtown Saint John, with the majority of instruction being provided by members of the Court of Queen's Bench of New Brunswick or by practicing barristers. In 1950, two professors of law were appointed. In 1953, the law school moved from the Provincial Building to Beaverbrook House on Carleton Street, at which time the faculty's dedicated law library was created; this year also saw the appointment of the first full-time dean of law. In 1956, an additional professor of law was appointed.

In 1959, the faculty moved from Saint John to Fredericton, where it was initially located in Summerville House, the residence on Waterloo Row that was used by Lord Beaverbrook as his Fredericton residence before he donated it to UNB in the late 1950s. The UNB Faculty of Law remained at Summerville House until the October 1968 opening of the law building (formerly Ludlow Hall), located at the intersection of Dineen Drive and Kings College Road on the university's College Hill campus.

=== Losses for Saint John ===
According to the book "Quiet Campus" by Dr. Peter McGahan of UNBSJ (ISBN 1896775101), the Saint John Law School moved from Saint John as a result of a report on the status of legal education in Canada by Professor Maxwell Cohen of McGill University. In his report, Cohen stated that the Saint John Law School was only "nominally a faculty of UNB." The report prompted Lord Beaverbrook and UNB president Colin B. Mackay to permanently move the Saint John Law School to the UNB Fredericton campus, despite the dean's objections.

The 1960s were a period of post-secondary education reform throughout New Brunswick, and Saint John did not fare well. The city lost all of its professional programs in the push to centralize programs at UNB Fredericton, including the Teachers College, the nursing school, and all engineering and architecture classes. During the same period, the Irish Roman Catholic community in the town of Chatham saw its Catholic liberal arts institution, St. Thomas University move to Fredericton under Mackay's direction.

== Location ==
The UNB Faculty of Law building was completed in 1968. Built with the support of Sir Max Aitken and the Beaverbrook Canadian Foundation, it was expanded in 1984 to its current size. UNB Law is also in close proximity to the Knowledge Park, Atlantic Canada's largest research and technology park, and the Canadian Institute for Cybersecurity, which produces research and applications in cybersecurity issues. These relationships and linkages create opportunities for multi-disciplinary study that make UNB Law.

== Programs ==
In 2012, the University of New Brunswick approved the reclassification of the LLB degree program and degree name to Juris Doctor (JD). It is a three-year program.

UNB Law also offers a joint Master of Business Administration / Juris Doctor (Joint MBA/JD) which allows for the completion of two degrees in four years.

== Notable alumni ==
UNB Law has many notable alumni who have gone on and served in both the public and private sectors.

=== Justices of the Supreme Court of Canada ===
- Gérard La Forest - Puisne Justice of the Supreme Court of Canada

=== Premiers ===
- Hon. Wade MacLauchlan (1981) - 32nd Premier of Prince Edward Island
- Hon. Frank McKenna (1974) - 27th Premier of New Brunswick from 1987 to 1997, Canadian Ambassador to the United States from 2005 to 2006

=== Members of Parliament ===
Shawn Murphy Member of Parliament for Charlottetown from 2000 to 2011

=== Other Notable Justices ===
- Justice Joseph T. Robertson (1977) - former judge of the Federal Court of Appeal and the New Brunswick Court of Appeal, Former UNB Law Jurist in Residence 2015 to 2017
- Frederick Eustace Barker, QC (1866) - Chief Justice of New Brunswick from 1908 to 1913
- Joseph Daigle, QC - former politician and Chief Justice of New Brunswick from 1998 to 2003
- Charles J. A. Hughes - former chief justice of New Brunswick from 1972 to 1984
- Gerard E. Mitchell,- former chief justice of Prince Edward Island 1987- 2008
- Tracey L. Clements, QC - current chief j ustice of Prince Edward Island 2017–present
- J. Ernest Drapeau (1977) - Chief Justice of New Brunswick 2003–2018

=== Other alumni ===
- Mabel French (1905) - the first woman in New Brunswick to be awarded a Bachelor of Civil Law degree and the first woman to practice law in two separate Canadian provinces: New Brunswick and British Columbia

== Admissions ==
The average undergraduate GPA of students accepted into UNB's LLB/JD program is 3.7 (on a 4.3 scale), and the average Law School Admission Test (LSAT) score is 158. In 2017, 92 students were admitted from a pool of 715 applicants.

The Faculty of Law usually admits 92 students per year, and the total student body is about 265. With 16 full-time faculty, the student-teacher ratio is 14:1, which is among the lowest in North America.

== See also ==
- List of law schools in Canada
