= Joint Court of Justice of Aruba, Curaçao, Sint Maarten, and of Bonaire, Sint Eustatius and Saba =

Court of Second Instance for the Dutch Caribbean

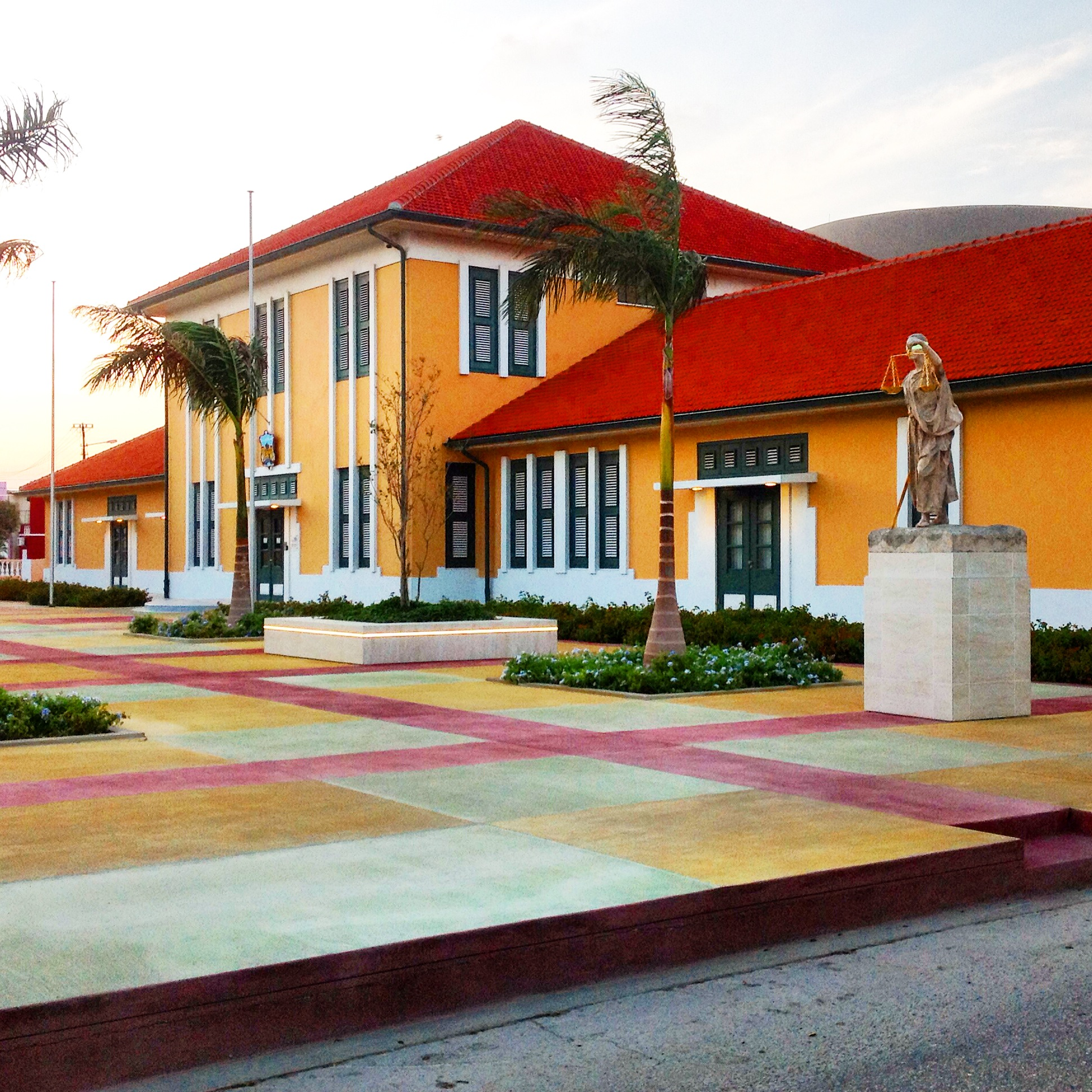
Courthouse in Oranjestad, Aruba.

The Joint Court of Justice of Aruba, Curaçao, Sint Maarten, and of Bonaire, Sint Eustatius and Saba (Dutch: Gemeenschappelijk Hof van Justitie van Aruba, Curaçao, Sint Maarten en van Bonaire, Sint Eustatius en Saba) serves the three Caribbean countries of the Kingdom of the Netherlands (Aruba, Curaçao, and Sint Maarten) and the three Caribbean special municipalities of the Netherlands (Bonaire, Sint Eustatius, and Saba). The court primarily hears disputes in first instance and on appeal of these six islands, and is on the same level as similar courts in the Netherlands. Since 2012, the court has also been authorized to hear inquiry procedures originated on Curaçao, of a type that would be heard in the Netherlands by the Enterprise Chamber in Amsterdam.

The Court has seats in courthouses located on Aruba, Curaçao, and Sint Maarten, and also is authorized to hold sessions on Bonaire, Sint Eustatius and Saba. Until the dissolution of the Netherlands Antilles, 2010, it was called the Joint Court of Justice of the Netherlands Antilles and Aruba.

== Court locations ==
The Joint Court includes four courts of first instance, which have session on 6 regular Court locations. Appeals are heard in 3 locations, but may also be heard on the remaining 3 islands. An overview of court locations is shown below

| Court | Instance | Main location | court abbreviation | comment |
|---|---|---|---|---|
| Aruba | "1st Instance of Aruba" and "Joint Court of Appeal" | Oranjestad, Aruba | OGEAA, OGHACMB | |
| Bonaire, Sint Eustatius and Saba | "1st Instance of Bonaire, Sint Eustatius and Saba" | Kralendijk, Bonaire | OGEABES | |
| Curaçao | "1st Instance of Curaçao" and "Joint Court of Appeal" | Willemstad, Curaçao | OGEAC, OGHACMB (appeal) | |
| Saba | "1st Instance of Bonaire, Sint Eustatius and Saba" | The Bottom, Saba | OGEABES | once per month |
| Sint Eustatius | "1st Instance of Bonaire, Sint Eustatius and Saba" | Oranjestad, Sint Eustatius | OGEABES | once per month |
| Sint Maarten | "1st Instance of Sint Maarten" and "Joint Court of Appeal" | Philipsburg, Sint Maarten | OGEAS, OGHACMB (appeal) | |

== Composition ==
Judges for both first instance cases and on appeal are taken from a single pool of judges. The Courts of first instance sit as a single judge, while the appeal session are headed by a 3-judge panel. Judges that took part in a case at the lower level may not participate in the same case on appeal.

== Right of appeal ==
Most decisions of the court of appeal may be appealed "in cassatie" to the Supreme Court of the Netherlands in The Hague. Decisions of the Supreme Court are final and do not address the facts of the case, but only points of law: whether the decision was based on the right legal grounds and properly motivated. The legal basis for those appeals is the Regulation of 20 July 1961, Stb. 1961, 212, titled the "Cassatieregeling Nederlandse Antillen" ("Appeals Regulations of the Netherlands Antilles"), later renamed "Cassatieregeling Nederlandse Antillen en Aruba".

One distinction between the appeals procedure in the Netherlands and that of the Caribbean territories is that when a judgment of a Netherlands court is overturned by the Supreme Court, the case is generally remanded to a different court at the lower level for purposes of rendering a new decision. Because the Joint Court is the only court at its level, it will rehear its own cases after being overruled. Another distinction is that clients may be represented by lawyers of the Caribbean islands, rather than lawyers registered with the court of The Hague.

== See also ==
- Constitutional Court of Sint Maarten
