= Philip Strax =

American physician

Dr. Philip Strax
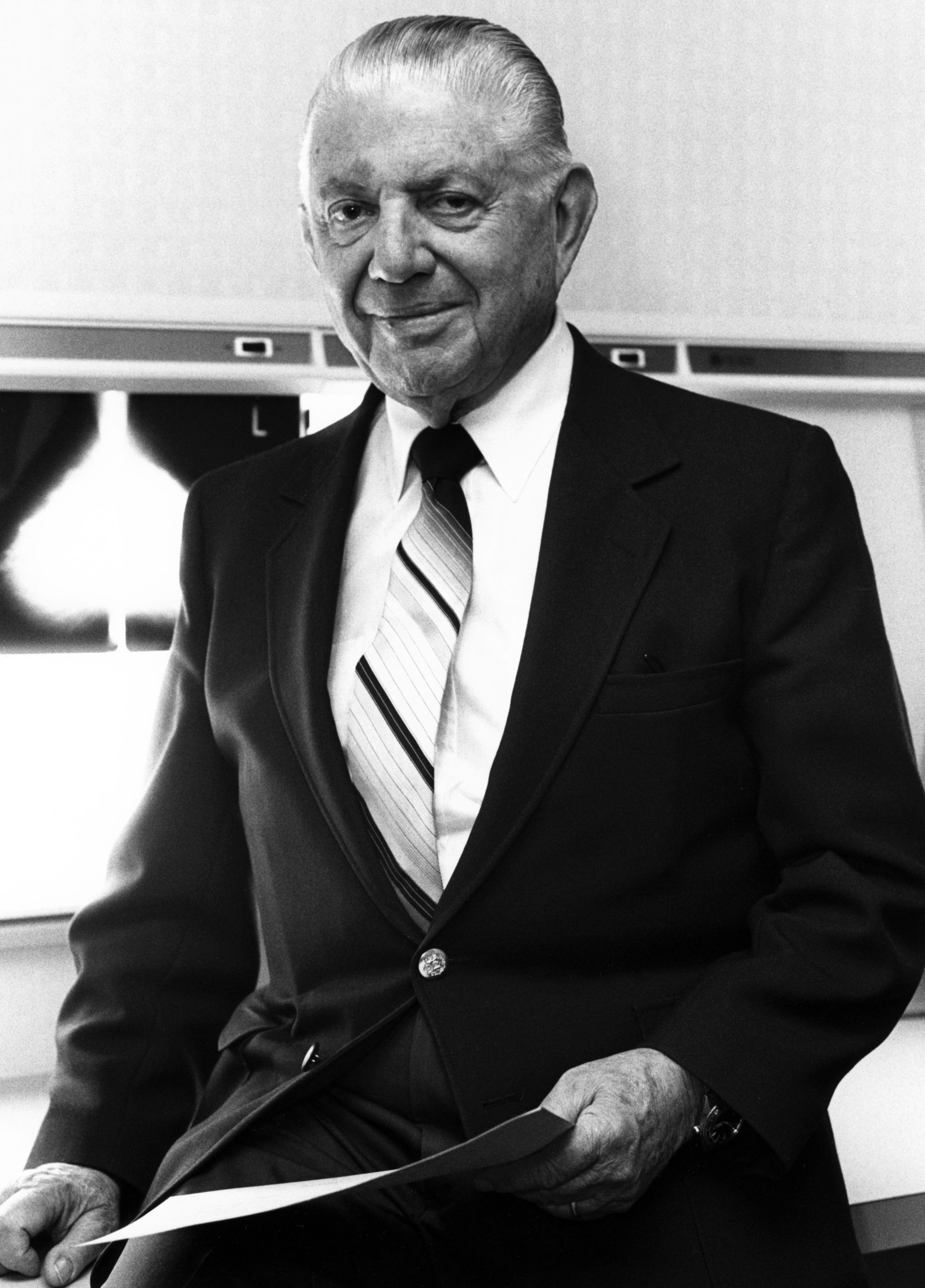
- Born: January 1, 1909; Brooklyn, New York, United States
- Died: March 9, 1999 (aged 90); Bethesda, Maryland
- Education: M.D., New York University School of Medicine, 1931
- Occupation: Radiologist
- Known for: Research on and advocacy of mammography for breast cancer screening
- Awards: Kettering Prize shared with Sam Shapiro (1988)
- Scientific career
- Fields: Radiology

Philip Strax (January 1, 1909 – March 9, 1999) was an American radiologist who pioneered the use of mammography to screen for early breast cancer. With his co-investigators, the statistician Sam Shapiro and the surgeon Louis Venet, he conducted a randomized controlled trial comparing outcomes of over 60,000 women who received either mammogram and clinical breast exam (study group) or standard medical care (control group). The first results of this study were published in the Journal of the American Medical Association (JAMA) in 1966. The study demonstrated that screening mammograms, which are routine periodic mammograms of asymptomatic women, could find breast cancer at an early enough stage to save lives. For this research Strax and Shapiro shared the Kettering Prize for outstanding contributions to cancer diagnosis or treatment in 1988.

== Early life ==
Strax was one of five children of Polish immigrants to the United States. The family lived in Williamsburg, Brooklyn, where Strax's father worked in the clothing industry. Three of the children became physicians. After finishing high school at the age of 15, Strax won a scholarship to New York University, where he earned an undergraduate degree. He attended New York University School of Medicine, graduating in 1931, and became a family doctor in Manhattan. He became interested in breast cancer research when his first wife died of the disease in 1947.

== RCT of mammography screening ==
In the early 1960s, Strax was a radiologist at the Elmhurst Hospital Center in Queens, New York, where he specialized in mammography. He initiated the first randomized controlled trial (RCT) of the use of mammography as a screening tool. The study was done in collaboration with Louis Venet, a surgeon at Beth Israel Medical Center and Sam Shapiro, the director of research and statistics at the Health Insurance Plan of Greater New York (HIP) The subjects were 62,000 women between the ages of 40 and 64 who were enrolled in the HIP. Women in the control group were given their usual medical care and those in the treatment group were also given clinical breast examinations and mammograms every year for four years. The study began in 1963. An article published in JAMA in 1966 reported that "early observations" supported "the hypothesis that the screening leads to earlier detection of breast cancers than is ordinarily experienced and that mammography contributes significantly to detection" but that answering "the crucial question" of whether screening reduced cancer deaths would take "at least five years of follow-up".

In 1971, Strax and his colleagues reported in JAMA that there had been 52 breast cancer deaths in the control group and 31 in the study group, providing "grounds for cautious optimism". Cancers had been detected at an earlier stage in the study group than in the control group, with 70% of those found in the study group "localized to the breast" with no indication of spread to the underarm lymph nodes, while only 45% of those in the control group were localized.

Based on the promising results of the RCT, the American Cancer Society and the National Cancer Institute initiated the Breast Cancer Detection Demonstration Project in 1972. It aimed to provide five years of free annual mammograms, clinical breast examinations and thermographic imaging to as many as 270,000 women between the ages of 35 and 74.

In 1988, Strax and Shapiro shared the Kettering Prize for "the first definitive study demonstrating that a screening program of mammography and clinical examination is effective in reducing death rates from breast cancer".

== Advocacy and promotion of screening mammography ==
Strax opened the first mammography screening clinic in New York City in 1969. The Stella and Charles Guttman Breast Diagnostic Institute was funded by a $300,000 grant from the Stella and Charles Guttman Foundation. In 1968, he had patented a "portable X-ray unit that makes possible mass screening for breast cancer in a mobile clinic", assigning the rights for the unit to the Guttman Institute. In 1980, he opened the Gertrude and Philip Strax Breast Cancer Detection Institute in Lauderhill, Florida.

Strax wrote several books about breast cancer and advocated for breast cancer screening worldwide, helping to set up screening centers in Europe.
