= Everyone's Getting Involved: A Tribute to Talking Heads' Stop Making Sense =

2024 studio album by various artists

Studio album tribute to Talking Heads by various artists
- Released: May 17, 2024
- Length: 66:12
- Label: A24 Music

Singles from Everyone's Getting Involved: A Tribute to Talking Heads' Stop Making Sense
- 1. "Burning Down the House" Released: January 31, 2024; 2. "Making Flippy Floppy" Released: February 28, 2024; 3. "Take Me to the River" Released: March 28, 2024; 4. "Girlfriend Is Better" Released: April 24, 2024

Everyone's Getting Involved: A Tribute to Talking Heads' Stop Making Sense is a tribute album to American rock band Talking Heads, their 1984 Jonathan Demme-directed concert film Stop Making Sense, and the live album of the same name. The tribute album, made in celebration of the film and album's 40th anniversary, features covers of the sixteen tracks of Stop Making Sense performed by musicians including Miley Cyrus, Lorde, and Paramore. The album was released by A24 Music on May 17, 2024, and debuted at the top of the Billboard Compilation Albums chart in August.

== Background ==
On March 16, 2023, the independent film company A24 announced that they had obtained worldwide distribution rights for the 4K remaster of the 1984 concert film Stop Making Sense, starring Talking Heads and directed by Jonathan Demme. The remaster premiered at the 2023 Toronto International Film Festival, with the band reuniting for a post-screening Q&A moderated by Spike Lee, on September 11. This was followed by a limited release in IMAX theaters on September 22, and a wide release the following week.

On January 10, 2024, a teaser video was uploaded on both Paramore's and A24's social media. The video depicted Paramore frontwoman Hayley Williams receiving a package containing a replica of the big suit Talking Heads frontman David Byrne wore on the album Stop Making Sense's cover art. The video announced the album and its lineup of 16 artists and bands, including Paramore, Miley Cyrus, Lorde, Girl in Red, the National, Teezo Touchdown, Kevin Abstract, BadBadNotGood, Toro y Moi, Blondshell, DJ Tunez, Jean Dawson, Chicano Batman, the Linda Lindas, Él Mató a un Policía Motorizado, and the Cavemen. The video was directed by AJ Gibboney and Paramore drummer Zac Farro, and ended with a snippet of Paramore's rendition of "Burning Down the House".

In an interview with Rolling Stone, Teezo Touchdown said that while he was largely unfamiliar with Talking Heads, his colleagues showed him the opening scene of Stop Making Sense as inspiration for his own upcoming stage show, an experience he called "a true discovery moment. With what [Byrne] was doing, and the production and the visuals, they had the total package." Chicano Batman singer/bassist Eduardo Arenas said he hadn't been a fan of the band, but watching Stop Making Sense around age 20 "just changed my life. David Byrne is running in circles around the band and still singing, and the whole band is killing it."

== Release ==
On January 31, Paramore released their full rendition of "Burning Down the House" as the album's lead single. Byrne called their version "amazing", and also released his cover of Paramore's 2017 song "Hard Times" which the band had told him was inspired by Talking Heads. Both cover songs were released as a twelve-inch single for Record Store Day 2024, for which Paramore were ambassadors that year.

The second single, Teezo Touchdown's cover of "Making Flippy Floppy", was released on February 28. Per Uproxx's Aaron Williams, the choice was fitting as Touchdown's "music refuses categorization or simplification", and the song's "funky bassline and elastic groove translate well in Teezo's hands." On March 6, Miley Cyrus previewed her rendition of "Psycho Killer", a "country twist" on the original with some lyrics changed, at a live event at the Chateau Marmont.

On March 28, Lorde's cover of "Take Me to the River", a Talking Heads cover of a song originally recorded by Al Green, was released as the third single. On April 24, the 40th anniversary of the film's debut at the San Francisco International Film Festival, the album's release date was announced for May 17 by A24 Music. The full tracklist was also released – consisting of the sixteen-song tracklist of Stop Making Sense in order – as was the fourth single, Girl in Red's cover of "Girlfriend Is Better".

== Critical reception ==
Everyone's Getting Involved: A Tribute to Talking Heads' Stop Making Sense ratings
Review scores
Source	Rating
Dansende Beren	3.5/5 stars
The Guardian	2/5 stars
Louder	2.5/5 stars
Paste	4/10

Associated Press's Jim Pollock said the album "should please old fans and inspire some new ones", and called it "a varied but remarkably coherent album from a broad array of artists that's a testament to the enduring excellence of Stop Making Sense." Dansende Beren's Jordy Vermote called the album a "fine selection of well-known and lesser-known artists was made, each of whom gave their own twist to a song, or just left perfection as it was. It is interesting to hear songs that have already proven their strength, given contemporary twists. We are happy to accept that not every jacket fits equally well, as the rest looks really good to beautiful."

The Guardian's Claire Biddles said the album primarily consists of either "karaoke-esque run-through[s]" or reimaginings which "feel wildly disconnected from the source material". She called the Lorde and Linda Lindas songs "spirited and fun" and Él Mató a un Policía Motorizado's contribution "slickly enigmatic", but said those tracks are "mildly diverting at best" from an album which is "just content." Louder's Emily Swingle praised some tracks, noting the Linda Lindas's as "arguably the finest tribute", but called the overall album "well-produced karaoke" lacking on the originals' "joyous experimentation". Paste's Matt Mitchell called the album "background music that never gets exciting enough to make you pull out your phone and Shazam it", and said "You won't think twice about this album, and you very well might just forget about it altogether once you start listening to something else."

== Commercial performance ==
After the album's CD and vinyl release on July 26, it debuted at number one on Billboard's Compilation Albums chart dated August 10.

== Track listing ==
All tracks are written by David Byrne, Chris Frantz, Tina Weymouth, and Jerry Harrison, except where noted.

Everyone's Getting Involved: A Tribute to Talking Heads' Stop Making Sense track listing
No.	Title	Writer(s)	Recording artist	Length
1.	"Psycho Killer"	Byrne; Frantz; Weymouth	Miley Cyrus	3:44
2.	"Heaven"	Byrne; Harrison	The National	4:17
3.	"Thank You for Sending Me an Angel"	Byrne	Blondshell	3:08
4.	"Found a Job"	Byrne	The Linda Lindas	4:12
5.	"Slippery People"		Él Mató a un Policía Motorizado	5:40
6.	"Burning Down the House"		Paramore	3:38
7.	"Life During Wartime"		DJ Tunez	4:24
8.	"Making Flippy Floppy"		Teezo Touchdown	5:53
9.	"Swamp"		Jean Dawson	3:20
10.	"What a Day That Was"	Byrne	The Cavemen	4:30
11.	"This Must Be the Place (Naive Melody)"		BadBadNotGood featuring Norah Jones	4:31
12.	"Once in a Lifetime"	Byrne; Frantz; Weymouth; Harrison; Brian Eno	Kevin Abstract	2:38
13.	"Genius of Love"	Frantz; Weymouth; Adrian Belew; Steven Stanley	Toro y Moi featuring Brijean	3:25
14.	"Girlfriend Is Better"	Byrne	Girl in Red	3:05
15.	"Take Me to the River"	Al Green; Mabon "Teenie" Hodges	Lorde	4:24
16.	"Crosseyed and Painless"	Byrne; Frantz; Weymouth; Harrison; Eno	Chicano Batman featuring Money Mark	5:23
Total length:				66:12

== Personnel ==
"Psycho Killer"

- Miley Cyrus – vocals, producer
- Maxx Morando – producer, guitar, bass, drums
- Shawn Everett – producer, mixing engineer, synthesizer
- Ian Gold and Piece Eatah – recording engineers
- Jonathan Rado – guitar, synthesizer

"Heaven"

- The National – producers
- Adam Armstrong – recording engineer
- Craig Silvey – mixing engineer

"Thank You for Sending Me an Angel"

- Yves Rothman – producer
- Lawrence Rothman – mixing engineer

"Found a Job"

- Carlos de la Garza – producer, recording and mixing engineer
- Sean Dorrian – recording engineer

"Slippery People"

- Santiago Motorizado – vocals
- Agustin Spasoff – bass, keyboards
- Pablo Hierro – bells
- Guillermo Ruiz Diaz – drums
- Gustavo Monsalvo and Manuel Sanchez Villamonte – guitar
- Pablo Mena - percussion
- Él Mató a un Policía Motorizado – producers
- Felipe Quintans – producer, recording and mixing engineer

"Burning Down the House"

- Hayley Williams – lead vocals
- Taylor York – guitar
- Zac Farro – drums
- Brian Robert Jones – guitar, backing vocals
- Joey Howard – bass, backing vocals
- Joey Mullen – percussion
- Logan McKenzie – keyboards
- Gavin McDonald, Kayla Graninger, Pam Autori, and Reggie Watts – backing vocals
- Carlos de la Garza – producer, recording and mixing engineer
- Harriet Tam and Mark Aguilar – recording engineers
- Joe LaPorta – mastering engineer

"Life During Wartime"

- Divine Chidubem Precious, Michael Adeyinka, and Ifeoluwa Ogunjobi – producers
- DJ Tunez and Steve K – mixing engineers

"Making Flippy Floppy"

- Andrew Keller – recording engineer
- Scotty Desmarais – mixing engineer

"Swamp"

- Jean Dawson, Biako, Hoskins, and Vic Wainstein – producers
- Johnny May – violin, keyboards
- Emmanuel Ventura-Cruess – cello

"What a Day That Was"

- Benjamin Chukwudi James and Kingsley Chukwudi Okorie – producers
- TUC – mixing engineer

"This Must Be the Place (Naive Melody)"

- BadBadNotGood – producers
- Chester Hansen – bass, synthesizer
- Alex Sowinski – drums
- Leland Whitty – guitar, flute
- Norah Jones – vocals
- Jens Jungkurth and Travis Pavur – mixing engineers

"Once in a Lifetime"

- Kevin Abstract – vocals
- Romil Hemnani – producer, recording and mixing engineer, programmer, guitar, bass, synthesizer
- Jonah Abraham – producer, guitar, drums, synthesizer

"Genius of Love"

- Chaz Bear – vocals, guitar, bass, synthesizer
- Brijean – vocals
- Andy Woodward – drums, percussion
- Pat Jones – mixing engineer

"Girlfriend Is Better"

- Girl in Red – vocals, synthesizer, producer, programmer
- Matias Tellez – vocals, synthesizer, producer, programmer, guitar, bass, drums, recording engineer
- Andreas Aunedi Høvset – recording engineer

"Take Me to the River"

- Lorde – vocals, producer
- Jim-E Stack – producer, programmer
- Devin Hoffman – guitar, bass
- Ian Gold – drums, recording engineer
- Eli Teplin – piano, keyboards
- Mark "Spike" Stent and Matt Wolach – mixing engineers

"Crosseyed and Painless"

- Bardo Martinez – vocals
- Carlos Arévalo – guitar
- Eduardo Arenas – bass
- Michelangelo Carubba – drums
- Money Mark – keyboards
- Sam Madill – recording engineer
- Kennie Takahashi – mixing engineer
