= Doing It Again Tour =

2024 concert tour by Girl in Red

- Tour by Girl in Red
- Location: North America; Europe
- Associated album: I'm Doing It Again Baby!
- Start date: 16 April 2024
- End date: 5 October 2024
- Legs: 3
- No. of shows: 41
- Supporting acts: Momma; The Beaches; Nieve Ella

Girl in Red concert chronology
- Make It Go Quiet Tour (2022); Doing It Again Tour (2024)

The Doing It Again Tour was the third headlining concert tour by Norwegian singer-songwriter Girl in Red, in support of her second studio and debut major-label album I'm Doing It Again Baby!. Consisting of two legs, it visited the United States, Canada and several European countries. The 36-show tour started on 16 April 2024 in Boston and concluded on 5 October 2024 in Helsinki. For the North American dates, American band Momma and Canadian band the Beaches served as opening acts, while Nieve Ella provided support for the European shows.

== Background ==
After teasing new music on her social media accounts, Girl in Red announced her second studio album, I'm Doing It Again Baby!, on 30 January 2024, set for release on 12 April. On the same day, she announced the lead single from the record, titled "Too Much". On 12 February, the artist announced her third headlining concert tour, the Doing It Again Tour; it serves as a follow-up to the Make It Go Quiet Tour, which concluded in 2022. She first revealed the North American leg; it will start on 16 April 2024 and contains bands Momma and the Beaches as special guests. It will have dates in Toronto and different cities in the United States. In March, she confirmed the European leg of the concert tour, starting on 27 August 2024 in Dublin. At the same time, more shows in American cities were added. Tickets went on general sale on 15 March via Ticketmaster; people who pre-ordered the album were granted pre-sale access for two days before.

== Tour dates ==
List of concerts, showing date, city, country, venue and opening act(s)
Date (2024)	City	Country	Venue	Opening act(s)
North America
16 April	Boston	United States	MGM Music Hall at Fenway	Momma
17 April	Philadelphia	United States	The Met Philadelphia	Momma
20 April	Washington, D.C.	United States	The Anthem	Momma
24 April	New York	United States	Radio City Music Hall	Momma
27 April	Chicago	United States	Byline Bank Aragon Ballroom	Momma
28 April	Madison	United States	The Sylvee	Momma
30 April	Toronto	Canada	History	Momma
2 May	Detroit	United States	Masonic Temple Theatre	Momma
4 May (Note: The show on 4 May 2024 will be part of the Shaky Knees Music Festival.)	Atlanta	United States	Central Park	Momma
5 May	Nashville	United States	Ryman Auditorium	Momma
21 May	Seattle	United States	Paramount Theatre	The Beaches
23 May	Salt Lake City	United States	The Great Saltair	The Beaches
25 May	Morrison	United States	Red Rocks Amphitheatre	The Beaches
28 May	Del Mar	United States	The Sound	The Beaches
29 May	Los Angeles	United States	Greek Theatre	The Beaches
1 June	Oakland	United States	Fox Theatre	The Beaches
2 June	San Francisco	United States	Warfield	The Beaches
Oceania
11 July	Perth	Australia	Centenary	Telenova
14 July	Sydney	Australia	Hordern Pavilion	Telenova
17 July	Melbourne	Australia	Margaret Court Arena	Telenova
21 July	Brisbane	Australia	Fortitude Music Hall	Telenova
23 July	Auckland	New Zealand	Spark Arena	Daily J
Europe
27 August	Dublin	Ireland	3Arena	Nieve Ella
29 August	Glasgow	United Kingdom	Barrowland Ballroom	Nieve Ella
1 September	Manchester	United Kingdom	O2 Apollo	Nieve Ella
3 September	London	United Kingdom	OVO Arena Wembley	Nieve Ella
5 September	Brussels	Belgium	Forest National	Nieve Ella
8 September	Amsterdam	Netherlands	AFAS Live	Nieve Ella
11 September	Paris	France	Zenith	Nieve Ella
13 September	Cologne	Germany	Palladium	Nieve Ella
16 September	Barcelona	Spain	Sant Jordi Club	Nieve Ella
18 September	Munich	Germany	Zenith	Nieve Ella
19 September	Zürich	Switzerland	Halle 622	Nieve Ella
22 September	Vienna	Austria	Gasometer	Nieve Ella
23 September	Prague	Czech Republic	Forum Karlin	Nieve Ella
25 September	Warsaw	Poland	Torwar	Nieve Ella
27 September	Berlin	Germany	Verti Music Hall	Nieve Ella
29 September	Copenhagen	Denmark	Tap1	Nieve Ella
2 October	Stockholm	Sweden	Annexet	Nieve Ella
3 October	Oslo	Norway	Spektrum	Nieve Ella
5 October	Helsinki	Finland	Ice Hall Black Box	Nieve Ella
