= You Need Me Now? =

2024 single by girl in red and Sabrina Carpenter

Single by Girl in Red and Sabrina Carpenter

from the album I'm Doing It Again Baby!
- Released: 22 March 2024
- Genre: Pop
- Length: 3:06
- Label: Columbia
- Songwriters: Matias Tellez; Marie Ulven; Sabrina Carpenter
- Producers: Girl in Red; Matias Tellez

Girl in Red singles chronology
"Doing It Again Baby" (2024)	"You Need Me Now?" (2024)	"Girlfriend Is Better" (2024)

Sabrina Carpenter singles chronology
"Cupid" (Twin version) (2023)	"You Need Me Now?" (2024)	"Espresso" (2024)

Visualizer video
- "You Need Me Now?" on YouTube

"You Need Me Now?" is a song by the Norwegian singer-songwriter Girl in Red and the American singer Sabrina Carpenter. Written by the artists along with producer Matias Tellez, the song was released on 22 March 2024 as the third single from Girl in Red's second album, I'm Doing It Again Baby! (2024).

== Background ==
Between 2023 and 2024, girl in red and Sabrina Carpenter were opening acts for Taylor Swift's sixth concert tour, the Eras Tour. girl in red first teased "You Need Me Now?" at an event for her fans in New York City. In an interview with the New York Times Popcast, the singer stated that, after sharing Carpenter's song "Feather" on her Instagram stories, they reached out and offered her to be a part of "You Need Me Now?".

== Composition ==
"You Need Me Now?" is a rock-infused pop song. On the track, according to NME, girl in red "calls out an ex's bad behaviour and 'games'", singing: "I'm tired of waiting around / Letting you let me down / I'm done being yours". Derrick Rossignol, for Uproxx, said that Carpenter's feature on the song "is done in a fourth-wall-breaking, super-fun way". She enters the song after a spoken bridge, where girl in red says: "You know what would be really fucking cool on this? Sabrina".

== Charts ==
Chart (2024)	Peak position
New Zealand Hot Singles (RMNZ)	23
US Hot Rock & Alternative Songs (Billboard)	40
