= 107 Faunos =

Argentine band

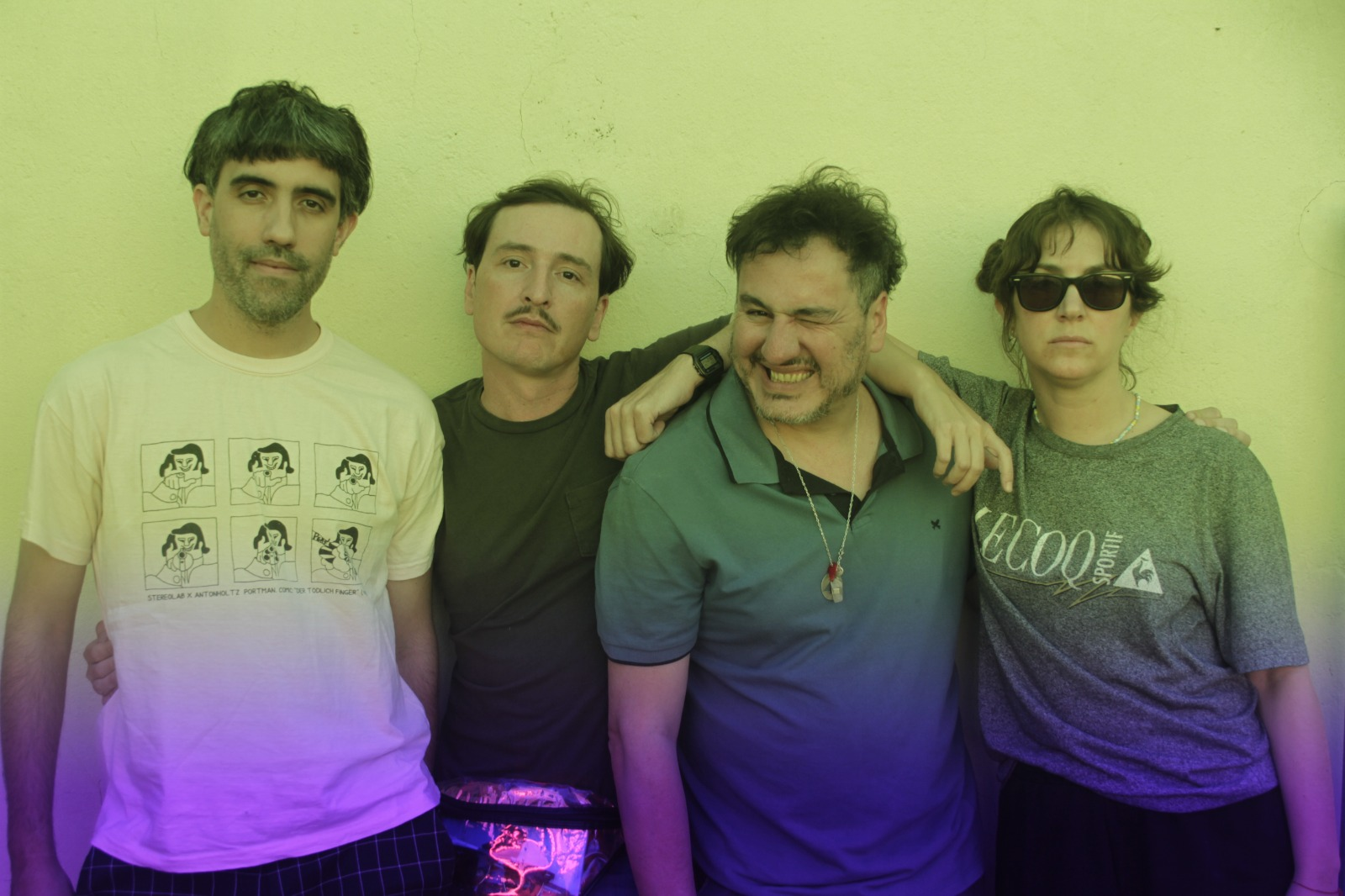

Background information
- Origin: La Plata, Buenos Aires, Argentina
- Genre: Indie rock indie pop lo-fi
- Labels: Discos Laptra; El Segell del Primavera
- Members: Javier Sisti Ripoll, Félix Sisti Ripoll, Mora Sánchez Viamonte, Felipe Quintans
- Past members: Carolina Figueredo, Pablo Iveli, Gastón Olmos, Miguel Ward, Juan Pablo Bava
- Website: 107faunos.com.ar

107 Faunos is an indie rock/pop from La Plata, Argentina, formed in 2006. They have recorded seven albums on the Discos Laptra label. They have been described as a pillar of the indie scene in Argentina, along with Él Mató a un Policía Motorizado, Las Ligas Menores, Mujercitas Terror, Los Reyes del Falsete, among others. Their songs combine a loose indie lo-fi style and evocative lyrics.

Founded by brothers, Félix Sisti Ripoll (bass, guitars) y Javier Sisti Ripoll (guitar, vocals), Mora Sánchez Viamonte (keyboards, vocals) and Felipe Quintans (drums) the group is considered one of the first from Latin America whose creativity and experimentation has been compared to Pavement, Television Personalities, Guided by Voices and Sonic Youth.

== History ==
=== Origin ===
The group was formed out of different bands from La Plata that had been playing local venues. In 2006 Javier Sisti Ripoll, then part of Grupo Mazinger, began to write songs with Miguel Ward, who was playing with El Destro. Although there was no set lineup, others joined, including Gastón Olmos from Ned Flander y Feliz on drums, Carolina Figueredo on bass, and occasionally Pablo Iveli on keboards which Mora Sánchez Viamonte would take over later. Their first few performances happened in La Plata and Buenos Aires at the same time they started recording their first album.

=== 107 Faunos ===
107 Faunos was recorded in La Plata at El Tímpano studios by Juan Novello and mastered by Shaman Herrera at Kraut studios, released the March 5th, 2008 on CD for the Discos Laptra label. Initial reviews were positive and the album was chosen as one of the best releases of the year by the magazine La Mano. The group solidified their lineup with the replacement of Carolina Figueredo by Félix Sisti Ripoll on bass, and the addition of Juan Bava on vocals and percussion.

=== Creo que te amo and El tesoro que nadie quiere ===
The new group continued to perform live and work on a follow up to their first album. Creo que te amo was recorded and mixed by José María D'Agostino (aka ExC / Ex Colorado) at Moloko Vellocet studio in the Parque Patricios neighborhood of Buenos Aires. Released April 28, 2010, it was well received by reviewers in Rolling Stone and Inrockuptibles, who highlighted the album's "freshness and the vitality of songs as well as the melodic creativity and its enlightened lyrics."

Creo que te amo was adapted into a musical, directed by Germán Greco. It was selected for screening at the BAFICI (Festival Internacional de Cine Independiente de Buenos Aires) for its 2011 season.

Also in 2011 the group released the EP El tesoro que nadie quiere. The release of this EP led to an invitation to play the seventh Personal Fest festival, headlined by The Strokes y Sonic Youth in Buenos Aires.

This kicked off a period of touring and shows around Argentina, Uruguay, and Chile. During May and June 2013, they toured Spain, performing eight shows, culminating in two performances at the Primavera Sound in Barcelona.

=== Últimos días del tren fantasma ===
In 2014 the Faunos released Últimos días del tren fantasma. Recorded at DRR and ION Studios. This album was self-produced with help from Guillermo Ruiz Díaz and released on CD by Discos Laptra. It was the final album to feature Gastón Olmos, who left the group in 2015, as well as Miguel Ward who left in 2018. It features the song Por ir a comprar which was covered by Los Planetas on their album Zona Temporalmente Autónoma as Seguiriya de los 107 Faunos.

=== Madura el dulce fruto ===
The group continued to play, adding the drumming of Felipe "Pipe" Quintans in 2015, while working on what would become their fifth album. Madura el dulce fruto was recorded Eduardo Bergallo and Lucas Rosetto in Romaphonic Studios, with additional recording and mixing at Resto del Mundo studios. The album was released digitally on October 8th, 2018, and on CD by Laptra on February 22nd, 2019. That evening group performed the album in its entirety at the Margarita Xirgú Theater. The album received positive reviews and was included on the cover of Inrockuptibles and the Radar supplement for the newspaper Página 12.

In April 2019 the band went on tour, playing four shows in Chile, including a gig at the Levantando Polvo festival, along with a second tour of Spain where they played ten cities. While there they played the Sound Isidro festival in Madrid and the Heineken stage at Primavera Sound 2019.

=== El Ataque Suave ===
The group spent the second half of 2019 recording and mixing the follow up to Madura el dulce fruto. The new tracks were intended as a companion to their previous release as "both albums bring together songs that play off each other where a playful spirit creates space for a stripped-down and clear sound." The song Sedán Discreto was released on online platforms in September 2019.

On April 30, 2020, the group released El baile del fantasma, a new song for the #Coreomanía compelation on the Primavera Labels from Catalonia. At the same time, the record label, a subsidiary of the Primavera Sound festival, announced that it would release a European edition of El Ataque Suave. August and September 2020 saw the group debuting two additional singles: Se siente así and El año pasado.

The full album was distributed on digital platforms on October 9, 2020, and the same day sales opened for vinyl versions of the album from Primavera Labels.

=== Spanish tour 2022 ===
From May through June 2022 107 Faunos went on their third tour of Spain, playing Marbella, Granada, Zaragoza, Madrid, returning to Festival Primavera Sound in Barcelona, their third appearance after 2013 and 2019. The band played Parc del Fòrum during the first weekend of the festival as well as playing alongside Él Mató a un Policía Motorizado at the Sidecar Room.

The group announced that while in Granada, they recorded with Jota from Los Planetas a new set of songs, although they gave no release details. In an interview with La Vanguardia, Jota mentioned the that Faunos was one of his favorite groups.

In 2022 the Faunos announced they were playing Primavera Sound Buenos Aires. Gabi Ruiz, the festival's founder, said they are an icon of Argentine indie rock that has earned a place in Spain.

=== Participation in Plena Pausa, solo album from J (Los Planetas) ===
In September 2023 Jota, front man of Los Planetas, released his first solo album, Plena pausa, which featured 107 Faunos as the backing band on the songs Y la nave va y Natalia dice. The songs appeared in films from Iván Zulueta.

To celebrate the 300th edition of Rolling Stone Argentina, in March 2023 the publication selected the 300 best national rock songs of the 21st century. They chose Jazmín Chino in 74th place because "it manages to exemplify all the qualities of the identity of 107 Faunos."

=== Vandalismo comparado ===
The group began work on the seventh album in 2023. The first two singles, Promesa Feliz and Bar de Playa, were released in December 2023 and February 2024, respectively. April 5, 2024 they released Aeronostalgia which features J from Los Planetas.

Later that year the group was the subject of a documentary directed by Gastón Olmos, their former drummer, which was part of the official selection of BAFICI. Desinteligencia Artificial was the second feature film about the group to be screened as part of the Festival.

Vandalismo comparado was released on May 10, 2024, on all digital platforms. It features eight new songs and the collaboration with J and another with Niño Elefante (of Él mató a un policía motorizado). The album was well received by the press, which highlighted that this album continued "to enrich a brilliant discography with its construction and honesty. In this synthetic and expressive era, tradition is avant-garde and vandalism." The Chilean newspaper El Espectador stated that "each new work by 107 Faunos brings something new to their career, as time passes the wiser their albums seem."

The group was announced as the opener for Pavement for their second visit to Argentina on May 15, 2024, a fact celebrated by supporters of both groups as an acknowledgement of their sustained success.

The newspaper Clarín praised the concert and mentioned 107 Faunos as part of Pavement's influence in Argentina: "all you have to do is listen to the La Plata-based band, 107 Faunos, who are thrilled to open for 'the best band in the world' and indebted to their style, though they add their own color and personality evident on their new album, Vandalismo comparado."

In July 2024, Argentine music publications, IndieHoy and Indie Club selected Vandalismo comparado as one of the best albums of the first half of the year. FARO (the Alliance of Ibero-American cultural and musical media) chose the album as the outstanding Argentine release of the month of May.

The band toured Spain in November 2024, performing at Sala Riviera with Los Planetas on two occasions to promote the 7" vinyl release of the single Aeronostalgia/Dueña, released on El Ejército Rojo.

== Discography ==
=== Albums ===
- 107 Faunos (2008)
- Creo que te amo (2010)
- Últimos días del tren fantasma (2014)
- Madura el dulce Fruto (2018)
- El ataque suave (2020)
- Vandalismo comparado (2024)

=== EPs ===
- El tesoro que nadie quiere (2011)

== See also ==
- Testigos del fin del mundo, an overview of Ibero-American music from 2010 to 2020 that features 107 Faunos
