= I'm Doing It Again Baby! =

Studio album by Girl in Red
- Released: 12 April 2024
- Genre: Indie pop
- Length: 27:51
- Label: Columbia
- Producers: Girl in Red; Matias Tellez

Girl in Red chronology
If I Could Make It Go Quiet (2021)	I'm Doing It Again Baby! (2024)

Singles from I'm Doing It Again Baby!
- 1. "Too Much" Released: 9 February 2024; 2. "Doing It Again Baby" Released: 7 March 2024; 3. "You Need Me Now?" Released: 22 March 2024

I'm Doing It Again Baby! is the second studio album and major-label debut by Norwegian singer-songwriter Girl in Red, released on 12 April 2024, through Columbia Records. Serving as the follow-up to her 2021 album If I Could Make It Go Quiet, it has been preceded by the release of three singles between February and March 2024: "Too Much", "Doing It Again Baby" and "You Need Me Now?", a collaboration with American singer-songwriter Sabrina Carpenter. To promote the album, Girl in Red embarked on the Doing It Again Tour, which started on 16 April 2024.

== Background ==
In an interview with NME following the release of her debut full-length studio album If I Could Make It Go Quiet, in April 2021, Girl in Red shared how she had already been "working on new sounds". At the Reading Festival in August 2021, she again confirmed that she was working on new music material. In February 2022, following the commercial success of her debut album, the artist signed a record deal with Columbia Records; the company confirmed it to Variety. In the following year, while performing at the All Points East Festival in London, she confirmed that her second studio album would be in production by stating: "This is just the beginning, I'm finishing the best album ever made".

She teased music at the beginning of 2024, a track which she labelled "the song of the summer", with the caption "2024 baby!". I'm Doing It Again Baby! was announced via her social media accounts on 30 January 2024, while sharing its artwork and release date. In addition to the album announcement, the artist shared a snippet of an audio file, hinting that it would be part of a new song on the record.

== Music and lyrics ==
An indie pop record, the singer described the album as an "elevated" version of her previous project, If I Could Make It Go Quiet (2021), and said that it feels more creative and confident. She cited Taylor Swift as one of her inspirations for the album.

"Doing It Again Baby" was named by the artist as "the most fun track" she has ever made. The third track on the album, titled "Too Much", is a song about "being pushed into a corner [and] told that your emotions need to be minimised, or in some cases not heard at all". "You Need Me Now?" is a rock-infused pop song, in which Girl in Red "calls out an ex's bad behaviour".

== Promotion ==
=== Singles ===
I'm Doing It Again Baby! was preceded by the release of three singles. The lead single, "Too Much", was released on 9 February 2024; it marked her first release since her 2022 single "October Passed Me By". A music video for the song was published on the same day. "Doing It Again Baby" was released on 7 March as the second single from the album. "You Need Me Now?", a collaboration with American singer-songwriter Sabrina Carpenter, was released on 22 March 2024 as the third and final single, alongside an official visualizer.

=== Tour ===
To promote the album, Girl in Red embarked on her Doing It Again Tour. Dates in cities in North America, starting in Boston on 16 April and ending in San Francisco on 2 June 2024, were announced on 12 February. American band Momma and Canadian band the Beaches served as opening acts. The European leg of the tour was confirmed on 7 March, with dates in countries including the United Kingdom, Belgium, Netherlands, France, Germany, Spain and Norway. Tickets went on general sale on 15 March via Ticketmaster; people who pre-ordered I'm Doing It Again Baby! were granted pre-sale access for two days before.

== Critical reception ==
Professional ratings
Aggregate scores
Source	Rating
Metacritic	71/100
Review scores
Source	Rating
AllMusic	3.5/5 stars
Dork	5/5 stars
The Guardian	3/5 stars
The Line of Best Fit	7/10

I'm Doing It Again Baby! received positive reviews from contemporary music critics. At Metacritic, a website that aggregates reviews of music albums, which assigns a normalized rating out of 100 to reviews from mainstream publications, the album received an average score of 71, based on 8 reviews, indicating "generally favorable reviews".

Alex Ingle of Dork describes the album as "a coming-of-age story set to music, a celebration of self-acceptance and the exhilarating power of embracing fun. It's a bold artistic statement that proves girl in red is here to stay, ready to conquer the world, one pop anthem at a time." Katie Hawthorne of The Guardian writes that the album "takes big, bold swings" but adds that "some of them miss."

The Line of Best Fit writer Emma Thimgren praised the album and stated that "is undoubtedly refreshing, both for girl in red's music catalogue and the music industry's stagnant fixation on pop-punk", but criticized that "the constant zigzag between tempos and moods is tiring."

== Track listing ==
All tracks are produced and written by Girl in Red (Marie Ulven) and Matias Tellez, except where noted.

I'm Doing It Again Baby! track listing
No.	Title	Writer(s)	Producer(s)	Length
1.	"I'm Back"			3:00
2.	"Doing It Again Baby"		Girl in Red; Matias Tellez; Kid Harpoon^{[a]}	2:25
3.	"Too Much"			3:03
4.	"Phantom Pain"			2:51
5.	"You Need Me Now?" (with Sabrina Carpenter)	Marie Ulven; Tellez; Sabrina Carpenter	Girl in Red; Tellez; Julian Bunetta^{[v]}	3:06
6.	"A Night to Remember"			2:50
7.	"Pick Me"			3:02
8.	"Ugly Side"		Girl in Red; Tellez; Tyler Spry^{[c]}	2:55
9.	"New Love"			2:52
10.	"★★★★★"			1:49
Total length:				27:51

Notes

- ^{^[c]} signifies a co-producer
- ^{^[a]} signifies an additional producer
- ^{^[v]} signifies a vocal producer

== Personnel ==
Musicians

- Marie Ulven – vocals (all tracks), programming (tracks 1–4, 6–10); piano, synthesizer (1–4, 6–9); guitar (2–4), drums (2, 9), cello (4, 8), clapping (4)
- Matias Tellez – bass, programming, synthesizer (all tracks); guitar (tracks 1–6, 9), drums (2, 9, 10), banjo (2), cello (4, 8), whistles (4), piano (7–9)
- Viljar Dunderovic – keyboards (tracks 1, 6, 9)
- Kid Harpoon – drums (2)
- Erlend Hisdal – drums (tracks 3, 5, 8)
- Rob Moose – violin (3)
- Mari Persen – violin (track 4); guitar, programming, synthesizer, vocals (5)
- Sabrina Carpenter – vocals (track 5)
- Tyler Spry – drums, synthesizer (track 8)

Technical

- John Greenham – mastering
- Mark "Spike" Stent – mixing
- Matias Tellez – engineering
- Andreas Aunedi Høvset – engineering assistance
- James Pinfield-Wells – engineering assistance
- Kieran Beardmore – engineering assistance
- Matt Wolach – engineering assistance
- Quentin Adrianasitera – engineering assistance
- Tess Greenham – engineering assistance

== Charts ==
Chart performance for I'm Doing It Again Baby!
Chart (2024)	Peak position
Belgian Albums (Ultratop Flanders)	34
Belgian Albums (Ultratop Wallonia)	122
Finnish Albums (Suomen virallinen lista)	37
French Albums (SNEP)	168
Norwegian Albums (VG-lista)	13
Polish Albums (ZPAV)	22
Scottish Albums (Official Charts)	12
Swedish Physical Albums (Sverigetopplistan)	8
UK Albums (Official Charts)	37
US Billboard 200	183
US Top Rock & Alternative Albums (Billboard)	44

== Release history ==
Release dates and formats for I'm Doing It Again Baby!
Region	Date	Format(s)	Label	Ref.
Various	12 April 2024	CD; digital download; streaming; vinyl LP	Columbia	
