= Serotonin (disambiguation) =

Serotonin is a monoamine neurotransmitter.

Serotonin may also refer to:

- Serotonin (album), or the title track, by the Mystery Jets, 2010
- Serotonin (novel), by Michel Houellebecq, 2019
- "Serotonin" (song), by Girl in Red, 2021
- Serotonin (wrestling), a professional wrestling stable
- "Serotonin", a 2024 song by OneRepublic from Artificial Paradise
- "Serotonin", a 2022 song by Tom Walker
- "Serotonin", original name for the 2026 song "Bully" by Kanye West from the 2026 album of the same name.

== See also ==
- Serotonin transporter
- Serotonin reuptake inhibitor
