= Too Much (Girl in Red song) =

2024 single by Girl in Red

Single by Girl in Red

from the album I'm Doing It Again Baby!
- Released: 9 February 2024
- Genre: Pop rock
- Length: 3:03
- Label: Columbia
- Songwriters: Matias Tellez; Marie Ulven
- Producers: Girl in Red; Matias Tellez

Girl in Red singles chronology
"October Passed Me By" (2022)	"Too Much" (2024)	"Doing It Again Baby" (2024)

Music video
- "Too Much" on YouTube

"Too Much" is a song recorded by Norwegian singer-songwriter Girl in Red from her second studio and debut major-label album I'm Doing It Again Baby! (2024). The song was released on 9 February 2024 through Columbia Records as the lead single from the album. A pop rock song written and produced by the artist along with Matias Tellez, it marked her first music material released in a two-year period, since her 2022 single "October Passed Me By". In parallel, a music video was also released.

== Background ==
Girl in Red released a song titled "October Passed Me By" in 2022, which served as the sequel of to her 2018 single "We Fell In Love In October", and as the follow-up of her debut studio album, If I Could Make It Go Quiet, released on 30 April 2021. At the beginning of 2024, she confirmed that she was working in new music material, for the first time in two years, by sharing an snippet of a track in a video of her on a set dancing to an unreleased song, which she labeled "the song of the summer". On 29 January, she posted another snippet of an audio file on her social media accounts. On the following day, she confirmed that it was part of "Too Much", when she announced its release alongside her second album, I'm Doing It Again Baby!.

== Composition ==
"Too Much" is a pop-rock song, described by Billboard as a "kiss-off to a lover who just cannot understand [the artist's] idiosyncrasies". It contains a pop-punk guitar blast and a "pumping" dance beat. While describing the song as epic and empowering, writing for NME, Liberty Dunworth interpreted that she "explores the theme of being in love with someone who is emotionally unavailable, and the empowerment that can come by embracing your vulnerability and releasing your self worth". According to Clash, it is a song about "being pushed into a corner, about being told their your emotions need to be minimised, or in some cases not heard at all". About the inspiration behind the track, Girl in Red stated:

"I've always been told I'm too much. Throughout my whole childhood and in my adult years. Getting shut down when I'm at my happiest or most excited made me feel self-conscious, alienated, and weird. It wasn't until I encountered the same feeling in my relationships, that I realised how much it actually hurt me to never feel fully accepted for who I am. As well I think culturally people tend to be too cool to have fun or to show true excitement and emotions, and I'm so tired of that facade".

== Music video ==
A music video for "Too Much", directed by Fiona Jane Burgess and produced by Smuggler, was released on 9 February 2024. In the "artsy" video, the singer "is seen getting increasingly frustrated as she tries to reason with a cruel partner, even taking her pleas to the theatre stage".

== Charts ==
Weekly chart performance for "Too Much"
Chart (2024)	Peak position
Japan Hot Overseas (Billboard Japan)	18
New Zealand Hot Singles (RMNZ)	33
Norway Radio (VG-lista)	2
US Alternative Airplay (Billboard)	23
