= How Long Will It Take? =

Studio album by Nieve Ella
- Released: 16 October 2026
- Genre: Alternative pop
- Length: 38:45
- Label: Artist Theory
- Producer: Jamie Rendle

Singles from How Long Will It Take?
- 1. "Drive" Released: 20 March 2026; 2. "Bite Back" Released: 29 May 2026; 3. "Standing on a Pane of Glass" Released: 24 July 2026; 4. "Romance Is a Desert" Released: 28 August 2026

How Long Will It Take? is the debut studio album by the English singer-songwriter Nieve Ella. It was released on 16 October 2026 through Artist Theory. The album features 11 tracks and was written with producer Jamie Rendle and guitarist Finn Marlow. Its songs explore growing up, identity, relationships and self-worth.

== Background ==
Following the release of her extended plays Young & Naive (2023), Lifetime of Wanting (2023) and Watch It Ache and Bleed (2024), Ella announced How Long Will It Take? in July 2026. The announcement coincided with the release of the single "Standing on a Pane of Glass", which addresses anxiety and emotional distress.

Ella described the album as a reflection on the ongoing process of growing up, explaining that it was about accepting that personal development is a long-term journey rather than a single event. The record was written with Rendle and Marlow, with whom Ella developed material drawn from a difficult period in her life.

== Singles ==
"Drive" was released on 20 March 2026 as the album's lead single. Ella described driving as a metaphor for taking control of her life and moving away from emotional pressures and attachments.

"Bite Back" was released on 29 May 2026. Co-written by Ella, Rendle and Marlow, the song addresses humiliation and self-protection. Rendle produced the track, which was mixed by Alan Moulder.

"Standing on a Pane of Glass" was released on 24 July 2026 alongside the album announcement. Ella described the song as depicting one of the lowest points in her life, with its arrangement building from a quieter opening into a more cathartic sound. Its accompanying music video was directed by Millie Jamieson-Pond.

"Romance Is a Desert" was released on 28 August 2026. The song presents a contrasting emotional perspective to the album's more anxious and confrontational material, exploring desire and pleasure.

== Critical reception ==
In a review for NME, Liberty Dunworth described How Long Will It Take? as an ambitious work that explores the difficulties of growing up. Dunworth praised Ella's combination of indie-influenced melodies, guitar riffs and personal songwriting, highlighting the contrast between the assertive "Drive" and the more subdued "At Any Cost". The review also noted that some of the album's less adventurous songs were less affecting than its more experimental moments.

Rolling Stone UK included the album in a weekly roundup of new releases, while Clash covered its announcement and release campaign.

== Track listing ==
All tracks are written by Nieve Ella Pickering, Finn Marlow, and Jamie Rendle, except "Angie" (written by Pickering, Marlow, Rendle, Ryan Rabin, and Ben Berger).

How Long Will It Take? track listing
No.	Title	Length
1.	"101"	2:15
2.	"Drive"	3:32
3.	"Standing on a Pane of Glass"	2:55
4.	"Romance Is a Desert"	2:55
5.	"Bite Back"	3:09
6.	"At Any Cost"	3:31
7.	"Angie"	3:16
8.	"Love:Hate"	4:01
9.	"I'm Not Dead"	4:14
10.	"Back to Basics"	4:19
11.	"How Long Will It Take?"	4:38
Total length:		38:45

== Personnel ==
Credits are adapted from the album's liner notes.

- Nieve Ella Pickering – lead vocals, backing vocals
- Jamie Rendle – production, backing vocals, programming (all tracks); drums (tracks 1–5, 9–11), bass guitar (1, 3–11), electric guitar (2)
- Finn Marlow – backing vocals, electric guitar (all tracks); bass guitar (2, 5), drums (3, 6), acoustic guitar (4, 5, 11)
- Matt Colton – mastering
- Rob Kinelski – mixing (1, 3, 4, 6, 8–11)
- Alan Moulder – mixing (2, 5)
- Matt Garnett – drums (6)
- Matias Tellez – additional production (7, 10); drums, programming, mixing (7); drum programming (10)
- Christopher Thomas – strings (9, 11)
- Yana Vannuffel – photography
- Joanna Szyczewska – creative direction
- Coco Marinese – creative direction

== Charts ==
Chart performance for How Long Will It Take?
Chart (2026)	Peak position
Scottish Albums (Official Charts)	3
UK Albums (Official Charts)	31
UK Independent Albums (Official Charts)	3
