= R.O.T.O.R. =

1987 film

- Promotional film poster
- Directed by: Cullen Blaine
- Screenplay by: Budd Lewis
- Story by: Cullen Blaine
- Produced by: Cullen Blaine; Richard Gesswein; Budd Lewis
- Starring: Richard Gesswein; Margaret Trigg; Jayne Smith; James Cole; Clark Moore; Carroll Brandon Baker
- Cinematography: Glenn Roland
- Edited by: Doug Bryan
- Music by: David Adam Newman
- Distributed by: Imperial Entertainment
- Release dates: October 27, 1987 (Italy); July 28, 1988 (video premiere)
- Running time: 90 minutes
- Country: United States
- Language: English

R.O.T.O.R. (also known as Blue Steel and R.O.T.O.R.: Police Force) is a 1987 American science fiction action film starring Richard Gesswein, Jayne Smith and Margaret Trigg. The film has been described as a low-budget copy of The Terminator and RoboCop with some elements taken from Judge Dredd.

The film is well known in Argentina as the origin of the name of the Argentinian rock band Él Mató a un Policía Motorizado (He killed a motorcycle cop).

== Plot ==
Scientist and police captain Dr. Barrett C. Coldyron develops a prototype police robot he dubs R.O.T.O.R. (for "Robotic Officer Tactical Operations Research/Reserve") as part of his vision for preserving peace in a chaotic future. His superior, the corrupt Division Commander Earl Buglar, pressures him to rush R.O.T.O.R.'s development so Senator Donald Douglas, the project's financial sponsor, can use it in his campaign for President. Coldyron refuses to have R.O.T.O.R. ready within sixty days and resigns rather than be fired, leaving the project in the hands of his incompetent assistants, Dr. Houghtaling and his robot, Willard.

After Coldyron's departure, a lab accident causes R.O.T.O.R. to activate and go on duty. While on patrol, it stops a motorist for speeding and, lacking higher brain functions in its programming, executes him. His fiancée, Sonya, becomes R.O.T.O.R.'s target, as it regards her as her boyfriend's accomplice, and the robot begins relentlessly pursuing her. Learning of the murder, Coldyron discovers that R.O.T.O.R. has been activated and is operating under its prime directive: "to judge and execute". He rescues Sonya from R.O.T.O.R. at a petrol station and helps her escape, warning her that the robot will keep pursuing her and that she must stay on the move. Devising a plan to stop R.O.T.O.R.'s rampage, Coldyron enlists the help of Dr. Corrine Steele, who developed the robot's combat chassis from a unique, self-teaching alloy. Together they realise that as long as R.O.T.O.R. remains fixated on pursuing Sonya, it will not kill anyone else unless they get in its way.

On Coldyron's instruction, Sonya leads R.O.T.O.R. to a fishing camp. Coldyron and Steele arrive soon after, and Steele sacrifices herself to tear open R.O.T.O.R.'s chest, exposing its power core. Coldyron then manages to lasso the robot's limbs with Primacord ropes to restrain it, and its electrical discharge detonates the explosives, destroying it for good.

Coldyron files a final report on the incident and leaves the police building, only to be ambushed and murdered outside by Buglar, who is covering up the corruption and embezzlement behind the project's funding. His nephew, Brett Coldyron, subsequently inherits his research and money. Determined to continue and perfect his uncle's work, Brett builds a new R.O.T.O.R. model, upgraded with the higher brain functions necessary for mercy and modelled after Dr. Steele's likeness.

== Cast ==
- Richard Gesswein as Captain Barrett C. Coldyron, a scientist who runs the police robotics lab and also manages a ranch. Coldyron's dream of a force of robotic officers is shattered by Earl G. Buglar.
- Jayne Smith as Dr. Corrine R. Steele, the designer of R.O.T.O.R.'s robotic chassis.
  - Smith also portrays R.O.T.O.R. II, an upgraded R.O.T.O.R. modeled after Steele that appears in the final scene.
- Carroll Brandon Baker as R.O.T.O.R., the killer robot that is accidentally activated. It is a dangerous machine that is adept at everything from tai chi to full field combat, and can visualize past events in an area by removing its sunglasses. It is built of a new alloy capable of self-teaching, but has one known weakness: loud noises immobilize it.
- Michael Hunter as Earl G. Buglar, Coldyron's commander in the police department. Buglar has been embezzling money from the R.O.T.O.R. project and has promised a corrupt senator, Donald D. Douglas, that the robot will be ready in time for the next election.
- Margaret Trigg as Sonya R. "Sony" Garren, an innocent woman who is stalked by R.O.T.O.R. after it kills her fiancé for speeding. Sonya spends much of the movie fleeing from R.O.T.O.R. in her blue 1986 Impulse while Coldyron and Steele work to develop a plan for defeating R.O.T.O.R.
- Shawn Brown as Mokie Killion, a hard-bitten sarcastic cop. Mokie does not like cleaning up the messes left behind when Coldyron stops group of armed shoplifters.
- Clark Moore as Dr. Houghtaling, Coldyron's laboratory assistant. He is placed in charge of the R.O.T.O.R. project by Buglar following Coldyron's resignation, and his incompetence soon leads to the cyborg's rampage.
- Nanette Kuczek as Penny Gayle, Coldyron's girlfriend.
- Quintin Hardtner as Brett Coldyron, Coldyron's nephew.
- Willard, Dr. Houghtaling's sentient robotic aide, is credited as playing himself. Willard serves as a voice of reason, often providing sarcastic comments on the events around him. He displays human-like behaviors, such as reading magazines and asking Houghtaling to share his French fries.

The film features extensive ADR, with Loren Bivens voicing Coldyron, Georganna Barry voicing Steele, and additional voices provided by Rocky Patterson, Mike Collins, Patrick Montes, Jo Brewer and Lawrence Morgan.

== Home media ==
R.O.T.O.R. was released on home video in the United Kingdom by RCA/Columbia in June 1988.

Mill Creek Entertainment included R.O.T.O.R. in their "Sci-Fi Invasion 50 Movie" DVD boxed set in 2011.

In October 2014, RiffTrax released R.O.T.O.R. as a video-on-demand title with humorous commentary.

In February 2016, the film was released on Blu-ray by Shout! Factory in a double feature with Millennium.
