= Él Mató a un Policía Motorizado =

Argentine indie rock band

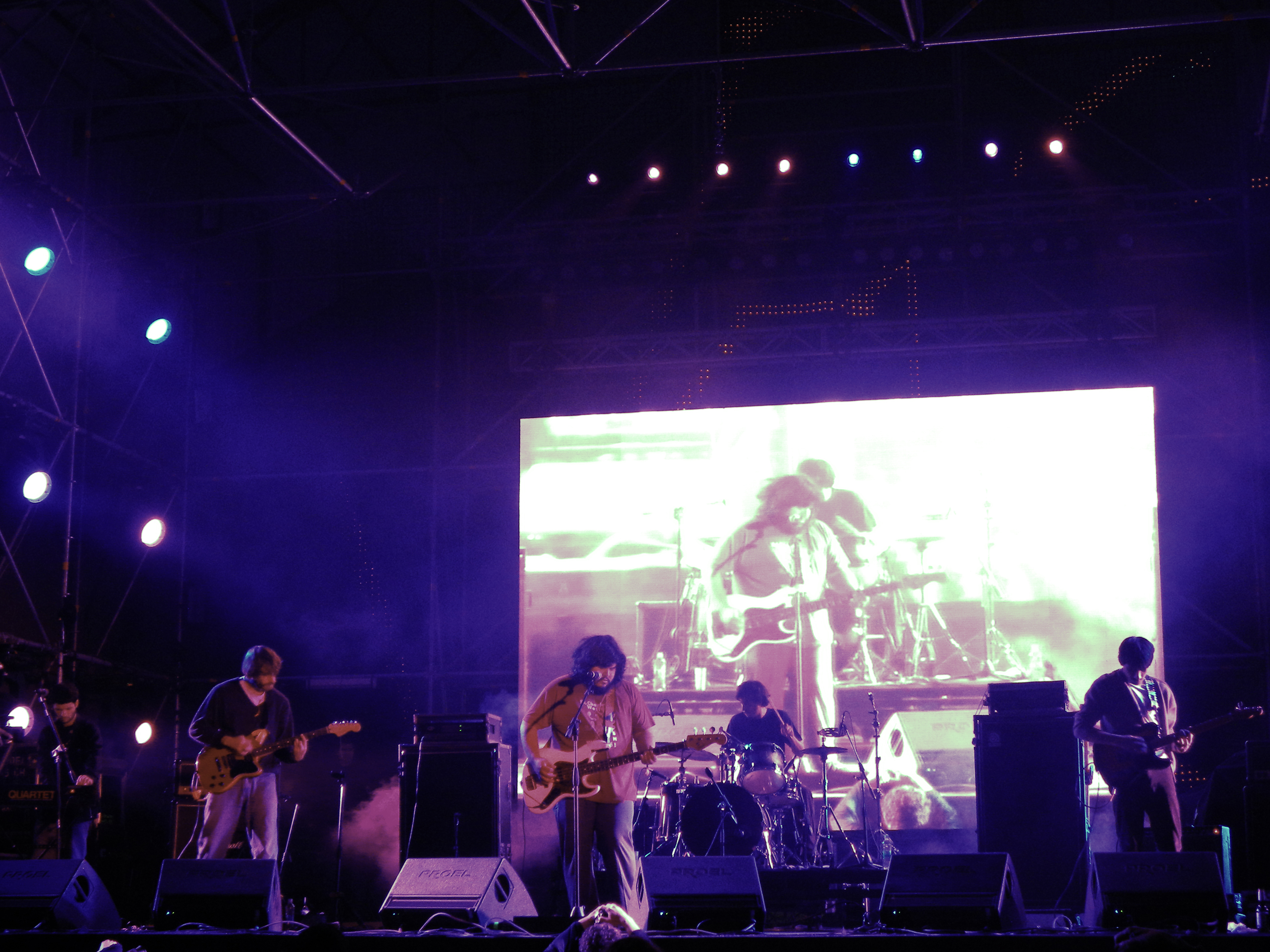
- The band in Vicente López, Buenos Aires in 2011

Background information
- Origin: La Plata, Buenos Aires, Argentina
- Genres: Indie rock; slowcore
- Years active: 2003–present
- Label: Laptra
- Members: Santiago Motorizado (bass and vocals); Doctora Muerte (drums); Pantro Puto (guitar); Niño Elefante (guitar); Chatrán Chatrán (keyboards)
- Website: www.elmato.com.ar

Él Mató a un Policía Motorizado, also known as EMAUPM or Él Mató, is an Argentine indie rock band from La Plata established in 2003. It is formed by Santiago "Motorizado" (bass and vocals), Willy "Doctora Muerte" (drums), Manuel "Pantro Puto" (guitar), Gustavo "Niño Elefante" (guitar) and Chatrán Chatrán (keyboards). The band's musical influences include Pixies, the Flaming Lips, Weezer, Sonic Youth and the Velvet Underground.

== History ==
Él Mató was formed when Willy and Santiago were in high school. "Manuel had a band and invited me to play... we composed our own songs, after that we called Willy and then Gustavo. We passed from band to band until we formed this", said Motorizado. After releasing their debut album in 2004, the band did a trilogy of EPs dedicated, respectively, to birth, life, and death : Navidad de Reserva (2005), Un Millón de Euros (2006), and Día de los Muertos (2008). On 28 November 2012 Él Mató releases their second studio album, La Dinastía Scorpio.

=== Name origin ===
The band's name comes from a line in Spanish from the 1987 film R.O.T.O.R. Santiago Motorizado told in an interview: "We picked a strange name that made fun of the typical band or artists' names. One day we were watching a bad movie, with a subtitle "Él mató a un policia motorizado" ("He [That boy just] killed a motorcycle cop"), and we said: that's it".

== Discography ==
=== Albums ===
- Él Mató a un Policía Motorizado (2004)
- La dinastía Scorpio (2012)
- La Síntesis O'Konor (2017)
- Unas Vacaciones Raras (2021)
- Súper Terror (2023)

=== EPs ===
- Navidad de Reserva (2005)
- Un Millón de Euros (2006)
- Dia de los Muertos (2008)
- Violencia (2015)
- El Universo (2023)

=== Singles ===
- "Tormenta Roja" (2004)
- "Mujeres Bellas y Fuertes" (2012)
- "Chica de oro" (2012)
- "El Tesoro" (2017)
- "Ahora Imagino Cosas" (2017)

=== Compilations ===
- El Nuevo Magnetismo (2003–2011) (2012)
- La Otra Dimensión (2019)

=== Appearances ===
- "Slippery People" on Everyone's Getting Involved: A Tribute to Talking Heads' Stop Making Sense (2024)
