= Testigos del Fin del Mundo =

Book by Javier A. Rodríguez-Camacho

- Author: Javier A. Rodríguez-Camacho
- Language: Spanish
- Genre: Music criticism
- Publisher: Rey Naranjo Editores
- Publication date: April 2023
- ISBN: 978-628-7589-07-0

Testigos del Fin del Mundo (Spanish for Witnesses to the End of the World) is a 2023 book of music criticism by Bolivian critic Javier A. Rodríguez-Camacho. The book comprises 120 long-form reviews written by Rodríguez-Camacho of Ibero-American albums released between 2010 and 2020.

== Background and content ==
Javier A. Rodríguez-Camacho is a music and film critic from Cochabamba, Bolivia. He is an associate professor at Pontificia Universidad Javeriana in Bogotá. Testigos del Fin del Mundo was launched by publisher Rey Naranjo Editores at the 2023 Bogotá International Book Fair. In March 2024 it was published in Bolivia by El Cuervo.

Testigos del Fin del Mundo contains 120 reviews of albums released in 2010–2020 by Ibero-American artists including Rosalía, Helado Negro, Princess Nokia, Empress Of, 107 Faunos, and Rita Indiana. In an interview on Radio Nacional de Colombia, Rodríguez-Camacho claimed that the book was influenced by the work of writers Silvia Cruz Lapeña and Lucy Sante.

== Reception ==
Colombian newspaper El Tiempo called Testigos del Fin del Mundo "a delicacy for music lovers." Pitchfork included it on their list of the best music books of 2023, describing it as "an illuminating compendium that documents scenes and sounds that have lived in the shadows for too long." Ricardo Pineda of El País compared the book unfavourably to Los 600 de Latinoamérica, an online collection of critical reviews of Latin American albums.
