= Nieve Ella =

English singer (born 2003)

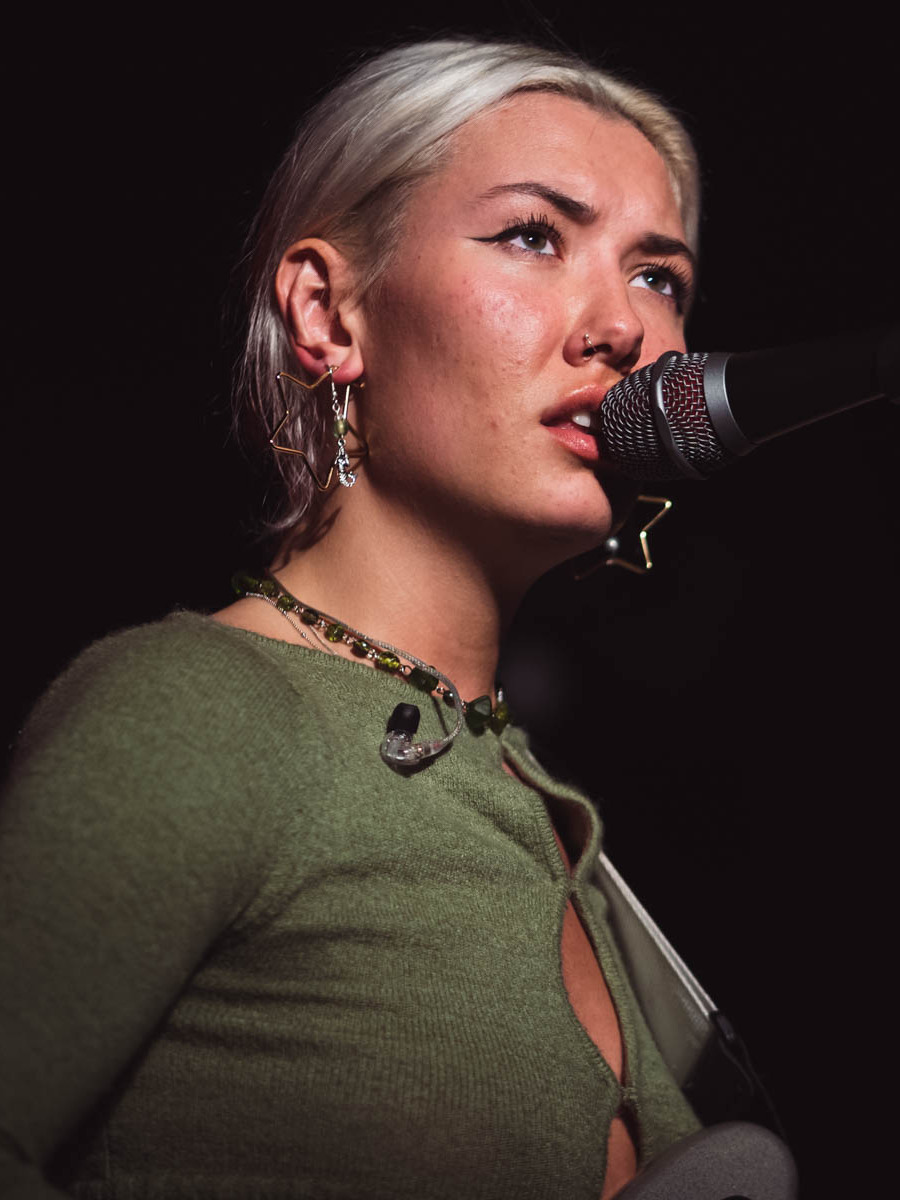
- Nieve Ella in 2022

Background information
- Born: Nieve Ella Pickering; 1 January 2003 (age 23)
- Origin: Albrighton, Shropshire, England
- Occupation: Musician
- Instruments: Vocals
- Years active: 2022–present
- Label: AWAL
- Member of: Loud LDN
- Website: Official website

Nieve Ella Pickering (born 1 January 2003) is an English singer. Her 2023 release, Young & Naive/Lifetime of Wanting, charted at No. 38 on the UK Independent Album Chart. She has also supported Dylan, Inhaler, Courteeners, and Girl in Red.

== Life and career ==
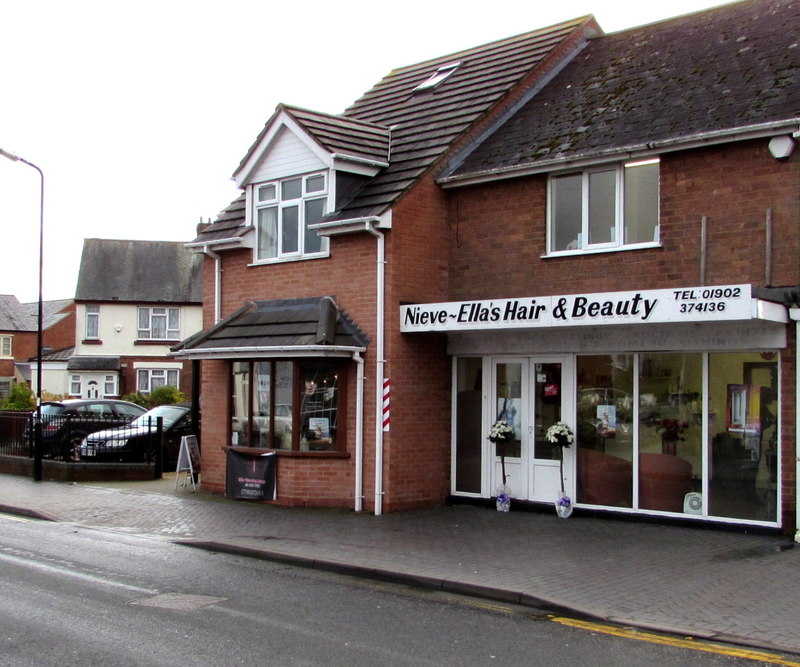
Nieve-Ella's Hair & Beauty

Nieve Ella Pickering was born on 1 January 2003 and grew up in Albrighton, Shropshire, with her two brothers. Their father moved to Spain when she was a child, having never lived with them, and died when Nieve was eleven. Their mother, Helen, is a hairdresser, and named her Albrighton High Street salon "Nieve-Ella's Hair & Beauty" after her, later renaming it to "Nieve Ella's Hair Salon". Her first musical interest was High School Musical. Growing up, she applied twice to be on Britain's Got Talent; in 2020, during the COVID-19 lockdown, she discovered her late father's guitar, and taught herself how to play it after studying tabs online, writing her first song "Four Years Gone" in less than a week.

She attended Telford College but dropped out after receiving harsh criticism of her guitar playing abilities, deciding to continue teaching herself. Her first single, "Girlfriend", was released in July 2022 on AWAL; the following December, she released "Glasshouses", a song about grieving, and the month after that, she released a five-track EP, Young & Naive, which featured "19 In a Week", a song about adolescence. In February 2023, she supported Dylan and Inhaler on tour. She then released "Big House", a rock song written about wanting to live with her boyfriend, and in May 2023, she released "His Sofa", a love song about her insecurities. She then supported the Courteeners at Lytham Festival.

The following July, she released "Your Room", which was released alongside a music video, and which described an ex-partner's new boyfriend and their infatuation with Phoebe Bridgers; the following month, she and Hannah Grae performed at Reading Festival. In September 2023, she released the EP Lifetime of Wanting, which included "Big House", "His Sofa", and "Your Room". Both it and Young & Naive were released on vinyl by Blood Records in November; said release charted at No. 38 on the UK Independent Album Chart later that month. Later that month, she announced a short solo headline tour in February 2024, during which she covered the Goo Goo Dolls' "Iris" and the Wannadies' "You and Me Song". In December 2023, she appeared on Dork's Hype List, and in March 2024, she released "The Things We Say", which she wrote shortly after arguing with her best friend.

She released "Standing on a Pane of Glass" in July 2026 as a single from her debut album How Long Will It Take?, which was released on 16 October 2026.

== Artistry ==
Her earlier works were inspired by Billie Eilish, while her later works including "Girlfriend" were inspired by Sam Fender, who she saw live in Birmingham in August 2021. In July 2023, Wonderland described her music as indie pop. She is a member of Loud LDN, a collective of London-based women and genderqueer musicians founded in May 2022.

== Backing band members ==
Current

- Finn Marlow – guitar, backing vocals (2022–present)
- Fran Larkin – bass guitar, backing vocals (2022–present)
- Matt Garnett – drums (2022–present)

== Accolades ==
=== Lists ===
Publisher	Listicle	Year	Ref.
Dork	"Hype List 2024"	2023	
See Tickets	"Ones to Watch 2024"	2023	
When the Horn Blows	"Ones to Watch 2024"	2023	

== Discography ==
=== Studio albums ===
Title	Details	Peak chart positions	
Title	Details	UK	BEL (FL)
How Long Will It Take?	Released: 16 October 2026; Label: Artist Theory; Format: Digital download, streaming	31	140

=== EPs ===
Title	Details
Young & Naive	Released: 19 January 2023; Label: AWAL; Format: Digital download, streaming, vinyl (Note: Both Young & Naive and Lifetime of Wanting were released on the same record.)
Lifetime of Wanting	Released: 1 September 2023; Label: AWAL; Format: Digital download, streaming, vinyl
Watch It Ache and Bleed	Released: 17 October 2024; Label: AWAL; Format: Digital download, streaming

== Music videos ==
List of music videos, showing year released
Title	Year	Ref.
"Girlfriend"	2022	
"Blu Shirt Boy"	2022	
"Fall 4 U"	2022	
"Glasshouses"	2022	
"19 in a Week"	2023	
"Big House"	2023	
"His Sofa"	2023	
"Your Room"	2023	
"Car Park"	2023	
"The Things We Say"	2024	
"Ganni Top (She Gets What She Needs)"	2024	
"Good Grace"	2025	
"Lucky Girl"	2025	
"All My Mess"	2025	
"Drive"	2026	
"Bite Back"	2026	

== Tour ==
=== Headlining ===
- Lifetime of Wanting Tour (2024)
- Watch It Ache and Bleed Tour (2025)

=== Supporting ===
- Dylan - The Greatest Thing I'll Never Learn Tour (2023)
- Inhaler - Cuts and Bruises Tour (2023)
- Inhaler - European Tour (2023)
- Girl in Red - Doing It Again Tour
- Bradley Simpson - The Panic Years Tour (2025)
