= Serotonin (song) =

2021 single by girl in red

Single by Girl in Red

from the album If I Could Make It Go Quiet
- Released: 3 March 2021
- Genre: Indie pop; art pop; electropop; pop-punk
- Length: 3:02
- Label: AWAL
- Songwriter: Marie Ulven
- Producers: Girl in Red; Finneas; Matias Tellez

Girl in Red singles chronology
"Two Queens in a King Sized Bed" (2021)	"Serotonin" (2021)	"You Stupid Bitch" (2021)

Music video
- "Serotonin" on YouTube

"Serotonin" is a song by Norwegian indie rock singer-songwriter Girl in Red, released as a single on 3 March 2021 from her debut studio album If I Could Make It Go Quiet (2021).

== Background ==
Marie Ulven produced the song with Finneas and Matias Tellez. She explained that "Serotonin" is for solving "self-destructive tendencies and mental health struggles through a more expansive soundscape".

== Critical reception ==
Layla Halabian of Nylon felt the song is "a genuine approach to dealing with, well, life, complete with an anthemic hook that make the low points seem a little more bearable."

== Music video ==
The music video was released 29 April 2021. According to a description by Daniel Peters of NME, it features "old home video montage, with Ulven running through fields and riding a car down a highway with red balloons", and the parts of climax is Ulven "flying through a fantastical sequence of a sunrise, Egyptian pyramids, and the default Windows XP wallpaper."

== Live performances ==
In early May 2021, Ulven made her debut on US television, performing the song at The Tonight Show Starring Jimmy Fallon. She later performed the song during the 2021 MTV Europe Music Awards, broadcast on 14 November 2021.

== Charts ==
=== Weekly charts ===
Weekly chart performance for "Serotonin"
Chart (2021)	Peak position
Belgium (Ultratip Bubbling Under Flanders)	19
Canada Rock (Billboard)	28
Japan Hot Overseas (Billboard)	8
New Zealand Hot Singles (RMNZ)	32
Norway Radio (VG-lista)	1
UK Indie (OCC)	31
US Hot Rock & Alternative Songs (Billboard)	20
US Rock & Alternative Airplay (Billboard)	6

=== Year-end charts ===
Year-end chart performance for "Serotonin"
Chart (2021)	Position
US Hot Rock & Alternative Songs (Billboard)	41
US Rock Airplay (Billboard)	13

== Certifications ==
Certifications for "Serotonin"
Region	Certification	Certified units/sales
Canada (Music Canada)	Gold	40,000^{‡}
United States (RIAA)	Gold	500,000^{‡}
^{‡} Sales+streaming figures based on certification alone.

== Release history ==
Release history for "Serotonin"
Region	Date	Format	Label	Ref.
Various	3 March 2021	Digital download; streaming	AWAL	
United States	9 March 2021	Alternative radio	AWAL	
United States	13 April 2021	Contemporary hit radio	AWAL	
