= We Fell in Love in October =

2018 single by Girl in Red

Single by Girl in Red
- Released: 21 November 2018
- Genre: Indie pop; chamber pop
- Length: 3:04
- Label: AWAL
- Lyricist: Marie Ulven
- Producer: Marie Ulven

Girl in Red singles chronology
"Girls" (2018)	"We Fell in Love in October" (2018)	"Watch You Sleep" (2019)

Girl in Red EP chronology
Chapter 1 (2018)	We Fell in Love in October / Forget Her (2018)	Chapter 2 (2019)

"We Fell in Love in October" is a song by the Norwegian indie rock singer-songwriter Girl in Red. It was released as a single on 21 November 2018 as a double single with "Forget Her". The song peaked at No. 14 on the US Hot Rock Songs chart in October 2019. The young girl with Girl in Red in the music video is Mina Rodahl.

== Background ==
In 2022, Girl in Red released the song "October Passed Me By" as a sequel to "We Fell in Love in October". The song's popularity contributed to Girl in Red's reputation as a queer icon of Gen Z.

== Credits and personnel ==
Credits adapted from Tidal:

- Marie Ulven – producer, composer, lyricist

== Charts ==
Chart performance for "We Fell in Love in October"
Chart (2020–2024)	Peak position
CIS Airplay (TopHit)	120
Czech Republic Singles Digital (ČNS IFPI)	73
Estonia (TopHit)	96
Global 200 (Billboard)	104
Greece International (IFPI)	76
Latvia (TopHit)	87
Lithuania (AGATA)	42
Poland (Polish Streaming Top 100)	63
Slovakia (Singles Digitál Top 100)	80
Sweden Heatseeker (Sverigetopplistan)	2
UK Indie (Official Charts)	30
UK Physical Singles (OCC)	4
UK Singles Sales (OCC)	63
UK Vinyl Singles (OCC)	3
US Hot Rock & Alternative Songs (Billboard)	14

== Certifications ==
Certifications for "We Fell in Love in October"
Region	Certification	Certified units/sales
Australia (ARIA)	3× Platinum	210,000^{‡}
Canada (Music Canada)	4× Platinum	320,000^{‡}
Denmark (IFPI Danmark)	Gold	45,000^{‡}
France (SNEP)	Platinum	200,000^{‡}
Italy (FIMI)	Gold	50,000^{‡}
New Zealand (RMNZ)	2× Platinum	60,000^{‡}
Norway (IFPI Norway)	Platinum	60,000^{‡}
Spain (Promusicae)	Gold	30,000^{‡}
United Kingdom (BPI)	Platinum	600,000^{‡}
United States (RIAA)	2× Platinum	2,000,000^{‡}
Streaming
Greece (IFPI Greece)	Gold	1,000,000^{†}
^{‡} Sales+streaming figures based on certification alone.^{†} Streaming-only figures based on certification alone.
