= If I Could Make It Go Quiet =

Studio album by Girl in Red
- Released: 30 April 2021
- Genres: Indie pop; indie rock; pop
- Length: 33:09
- Label: World in Red / AWAL Recordings
- Producers: Girl in Red; Matias Tellez; Finneas

Girl in Red chronology
Chapter 2 (2019)	If I Could Make It Go Quiet (2021)	I'm Doing It Again Baby! (2024)

Singles from If I Could Make It Go Quiet
- 1. "Midnight Love" Released: 14 April 2020; 2. "Rue" Released: 26 August 2020; 3. "Serotonin" Released: 3 March 2021; 4. "You Stupid Bitch" Released: 14 April 2021; 5. "Body and Mind" Released: 27 May 2021; 6. "I'll Call You Mine" Released: 15 October 2021

If I Could Make It Go Quiet (stylized in all lowercase) is the debut studio album by Norwegian musician Girl in Red, released independently through AWAL and her own World in Red label on 30 April 2021, after being delayed due to the COVID-19 pandemic. It was primarily produced by the musician herself alongside Matias Tellez and features additional production from Finneas O'Connell.

Sonically, it has been described as a more ambitious, mature, and developed continuation of the musician's previous bedroom pop and indie rock musical style established in the early EPs Chapter 1 (2018) and Chapter 2 (2019). Lyrically, the singer has described the record as an "emotional recap" of the year 2020 in which she explores her personal mental health experiences as well as "the different sides of love".

== Critical reception ==
Professional ratings
Aggregate scores
Source	Rating
AnyDecentMusic?	7.4/10
Metacritic	77/100
Review scores
Source	Rating
AllMusic	3/5 stars
Clash	8/10
DIY	4.5/5 stars
Exclaim!	7/10
The Line of Best Fit	8/10
MusicOMH	4/5 stars
NME	4/5 stars
The Observer	4/5 stars
Paste	8/10
Pitchfork	6.8/10

If I Could Make It Go Quiet received mostly positive reviews from music critics, praising the vocal performance, songwriting, lyrical content, production and visual style for the album. Some critics felt that the album was Girl in Red's best work to date. On Metacritic, which assigns a normalized score out of 100 to ratings from publications, the album received an average score of 77 based on 14 reviews, indicating "generally favorable reviews".

== Background and release ==
In late 2019 and early 2020, Girl in Red began continuously teasing and hinting at the phrase "World in Red". She told Billboard in September 2019 that this would be the title of her debut album which would be released in October 2020, and that 2020 would be her year of "world domination", but this plan was spoiled due to the impact of the COVID-19 pandemic on the music industry. She told NME in April 2020, that "[the COVID-19 pandemic] ain't gonna stop World In Red, baby!" In April 2020, the single "Midnight Love" was released as the lead single and first taste from what was then deemed Girl in Red's debut album. "Rue" was released as the second single in August 2020. "Serotonin" was released as the third single soon after the album's announcement on social media in early March 2021. The official album cover was revealed with this announcement to be a painting by Norwegian artist Fredrik Wiig Sørensen. The artist is not credited in the release. "Serotonin" premiered as Irish DJ Annie Mac's Hottest Record on BBC Radio 1, where Girl in Red herself deemed it "the biggest track [she's] ever put out" and "the best track [she] has ever written or produced".

"Apartment 402" was featured on the soundtrack of FIFA 22.

== Recording, concept and composition ==
The record was primarily produced by Girl in Red and Norwegian musician Matias Tellez, making it the first time in the former's career that she has worked with a record producer other than herself. The album's second single, "Rue", was inspired by the titular fictional character for the American TV series Euphoria, while its third single, "Serotonin", also features additional production from American record producer Finneas O'Connell. The latter deemed it "one of the coolest songs [he had] ever heard" and revealed that he was "thrilled that [he] got to be a part of it." Girl in Red revealed to NME that she's "definitely confronting [her]self on this album" and described the record as "cohesive". She also told Insider about her plans and ambitions for the album's rollout and recording, noting that it "promises a more developed and mature sound." The song "Serotonin" explores her personal struggles with intrusive thoughts which she claimed to have experienced for over 10 years.

And while its title is still under wraps, she promises that "there's some crazy shit going down on this album. I can tell you that for sure. I'm doing things I've never done before. It's a very, very ambitious album." Still bearing the distinctive girl in red hallmarks we know and love – "except way, way cooler," Marie notes – the singer is already sure of her ideal reaction to the album: "'Holy fuck, I didn't see this coming! This is some grown, 2.0 shit.'" The record, she continues, acts as an "emotional recap" of the past year. "I'm writing a lot about my mental health and the different sides of love – you know, the type of things that take up my time," she elaborates.

— Sophie Walker, interview with Girl in Red prior to the announcement of the album, DIY

Sonically, If I Could Make It Go Quiet is an indie pop, indie rock and pop album with elements of synth-pop, R&B, new wave, rap and piano balladry.

== Track listing ==
All tracks are written by Girl in Red. All tracks are produced by Girl in Red and Matias Tellez; "Serotonin" produced by Girl in Red, Matias Tellez, and Finneas.

If I Could Make It Go Quiet track listing
No.	Title	Length
1.	"Serotonin"	3:02
2.	"Did You Come?"	3:10
3.	"Body and Mind"	3:06
4.	"Hornylovesickmess"	2:55
5.	"Midnight Love"	3:13
6.	"You Stupid Bitch"	3:15
7.	"Rue"	3:36
8.	"Apartment 402"	3:25
9.	"."	2:46
10.	"I'll Call You Mine"	3:21
11.	"It Would Feel Like This"	1:20
Total length:		33:09

If I Could Make It Go Quiet – Apple Music Deluxe edition
No.	Title	Length
12.	"Girl in Red on Serotonin"	2:10

Notes

- "." is pronounced as period
- "Hornylovesickmess", "Midnight Love", and "It Would Feel Like This" are all stylized in lowercase.

== Charts ==
Chart performance for If I Could Make It Go Quiet
Chart (2021)	Peak position
Australian Albums (ARIA)	10
Austrian Albums (Ö3 Austria)	32
Belgian Albums (Ultratop Flanders)	11
Belgian Albums (Ultratop Wallonia)	83
Dutch Albums (Album Top 100)	7
Finnish Albums (Suomen virallinen lista)	30
French Physical Albums (SNEP)	94
German Albums (Offizielle Top 100)	19
Irish Albums (Official Charts)	10
Lithuanian Albums (AGATA)	22
New Zealand Albums (RMNZ)	31
Norwegian Albums (VG-lista)	2
Polish Albums (ZPAV)	21
Scottish Albums (Official Charts)	8
Swedish Albums (Sverigetopplistan)	31
Swiss Albums (Schweizer Hitparade)	33
UK Albums (Official Charts)	7
UK Independent Albums (Official Charts)	4
US Billboard 200	67
US Independent Albums (Billboard)	8
US Top Alternative Albums (Billboard)	8
US Top Rock Albums (Billboard)	11

== Certifications ==
Certifications for "If I Could Make It Go Quiet"
Region	Certification	Certified units/sales
United Kingdom (BPI)	Silver	60,000^{‡}
^{‡} Sales+streaming figures based on certification alone.

== Release history ==
Release history and details for If I Could Make It Go Quiet
Region	Date	Format	Label	Catalogue	Ref.
Various	30 April 2021	Digital download; streaming; CD; LP	AWAL	Not applicable	
Australia	30 April 2021	CD	AWAL	GIR002CD	
Australia	30 April 2021	LP	AWAL	GIR002LPSIGNED	
