= List of The Tonight Show Starring Jimmy Fallon episodes =

The Tonight Show Starring Jimmy Fallon is an American late-night talk show that airs weeknights at 11:35 pm Eastern/10:35 pm Central on NBC in the United States. The hour-long show has aired since February 17, 2014 and is hosted by actor, comedian and performer Jimmy Fallon, an alumnus of Saturday Night Live. Hip-hop/neo soul band The Roots serve as the show's house band, and Steve Higgins as the show's announcer. A total of 2,296 episodes has aired. Roots drummer Questlove often announces the episode number just before Higgins introduces Fallon.

== Episodes ==
=== June ===
No.	Original release date	Guest(s)	Musical/entertainment guest(s)
2297	June 1, 2026	Tina Fey, Marlon Wayans, Jazz Chisholm Jr.	Schmigadoon!
2298	June 2, 2026	Paul Rudd, Lord Andrew Lloyd Webber, Nicholas Galitzine	Ron Taylor
2299	June 3, 2026	Nick Jonas, Amy Sedaris	Violet Grohl
2300	June 4, 2026	John Lithgow, Regina Hall	Malcolm Todd
