= Girl in Red =

Norwegian singer (born 1999)

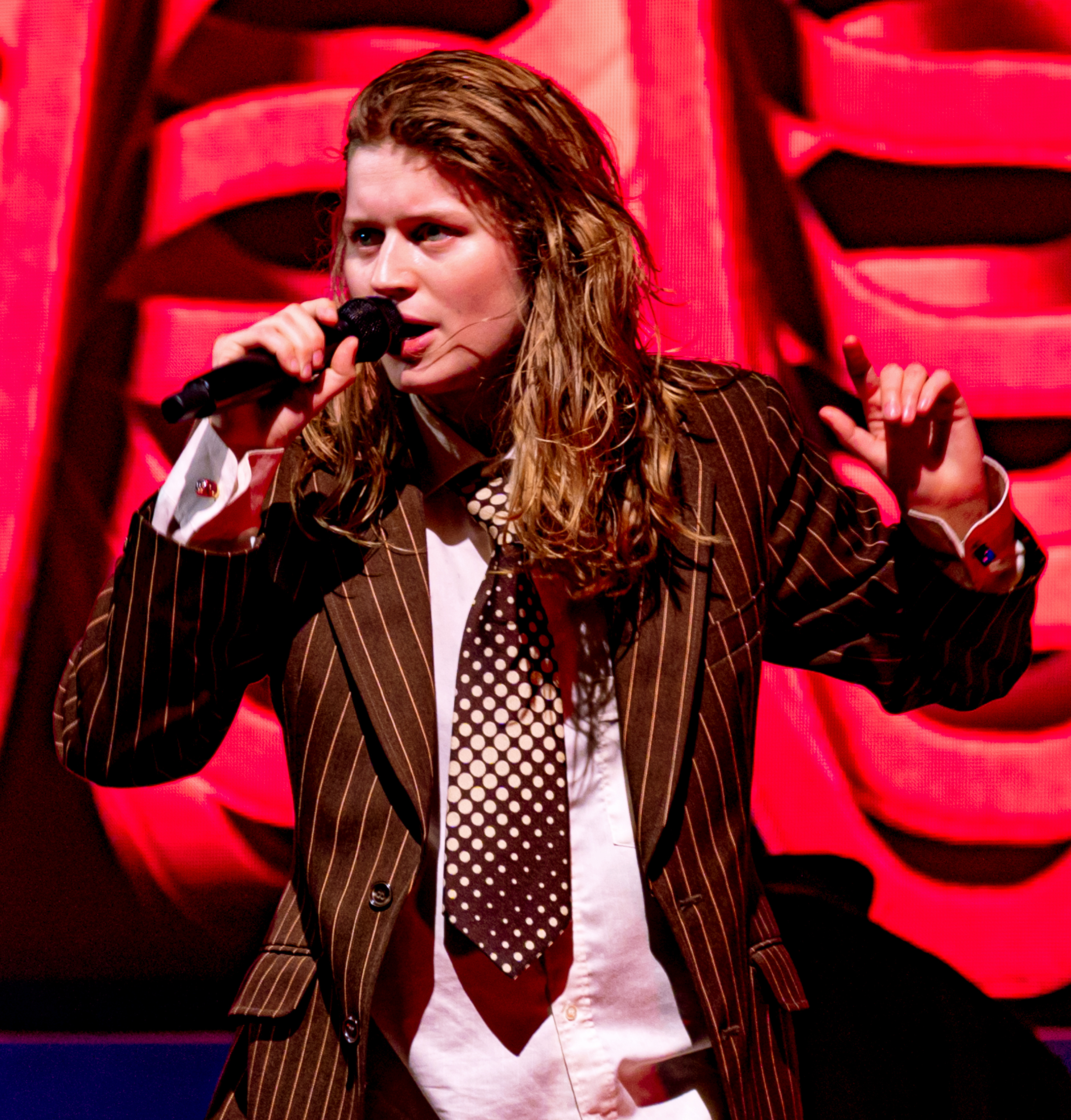
- Girl in Red in 2024

Background information
- Born: Marie Ulven Ringheim; 16 February 1999 (age 27); Horten, Norway
- Genres: Pop; alternative pop; indie pop; indie rock; dream pop; lo-fi
- Occupations: Singer; musician; songwriter; producer
- Instruments: Vocals; guitar; keyboards
- Years active: 2017–present
- Labels: AWAL; Columbia
- Website: worldinred.com

Marie Ulven Ringheim (born 16 February 1999), known professionally as Girl in Red (stylised in all lowercase), is a Norwegian singer, songwriter and producer. Her first EPs Chapter 1 (2018) and Chapter 2 (2019) were recorded in her bedroom and feature songs about romance and mental health. Released through AWAL, her debut studio album If I Could Make It Go Quiet (2021) was a critical and commercial success, and won three Spellemann Awards, including Spellemann of the Year. She then signed to Columbia Records and released her second album, I'm Doing It Again Baby!, to moderate success in 2024.

Girl in Red has been cited as a queer icon by Paper, and "one of the most astute and exciting singer-songwriters working in the world of guitar music" by The New York Times. She has sold over five million certified digital units in the United States according to the Recording Industry Association of America (RIAA). She was awarded the Telenor Culture Prize in 2022 for her "artistic distinctiveness and explicit messages of boundless love".

== Early life ==
Marie Ulven Ringheim was born in the town of Horten, Norway, on 16 February 1999. She grew up with her sisters and her divorced parents, and described Horten as "quiet and kinda boring" in an interview with Triple J in October 2019. Her mother worked with technology and her father worked as a policeman. Her grandfather could play the guitar and piano; however, she grew up without instruments in the house. While in high school, Ulven was curious about becoming a teacher before she was introduced to the guitar and songwriting at the age of 14. Ulven received her first guitar as a Christmas gift from her grandfather in 2012, but didn't start playing it until 2013 after losing interest in fingerboarding. She credits her grandfather for sparking her interest in music. Ulven taught herself piano, guitar and music production in her bedroom. She began by writing and releasing Norwegian music and planned to study music, but never concluded that she was going to become a musician.

== Career ==
=== 2015–2019: SoundCloud and EPs ===
After getting a Blue Yeti microphone from her father in 2015, Ulven began writing and releasing Norwegian music to SoundCloud under the moniker of "Lydia X". She stopped attending guitar lessons after six months once her teacher refused to acknowledge her interest in songwriting and producing. Ulven coined the stagename "Girl in Red" after attempting to identify herself in a crowd to a friend via text. Using the new moniker, she published her debut single "I Wanna Be Your Girlfriend" on SoundCloud in November 2016, where it amassed 5,000 streams within five months. Following the single's feature on the Norwegian music website NRK Urørt, "I Wanna Be Your Girlfriend" amassed thousands of streams and gained Ulven a large online following.

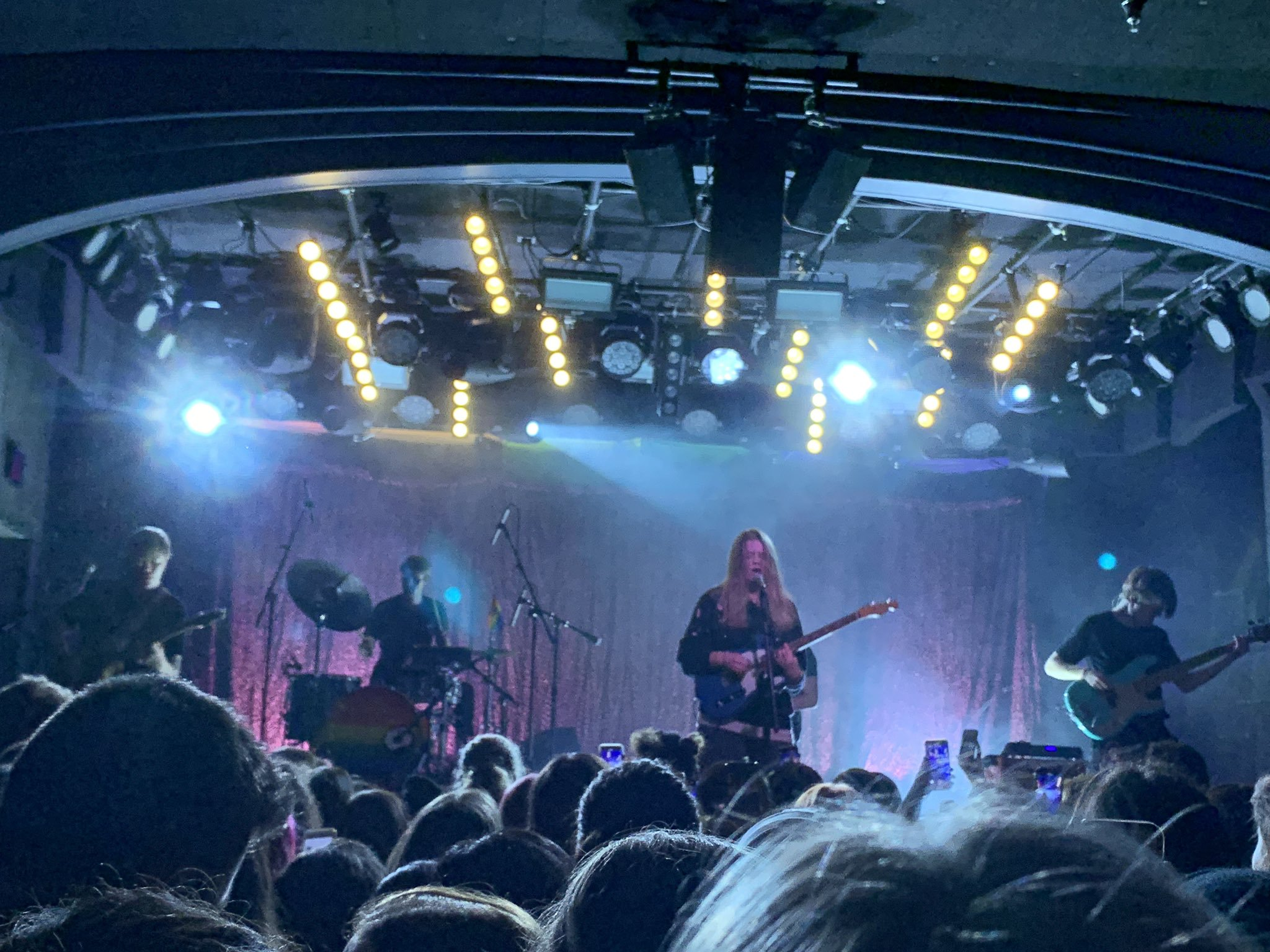
Girl in Red in Los Angeles in September 2019

Ulven's 2018 singles "Summer Depression" and "Girls" gained millions of views and streams online. In early 2019, she won her first award when she was presented with Norwegian Newcomer of the Year at the 2018 GAFFA Awards.

Ulven released "I Wanna Be Your Girlfriend" on Apple Music in March 2018. "I Wanna Be Your Girlfriend" was listed at number 9 on The New York Times list of "The 68 Best Songs of 2018" and won Untouched of the Year at the 2018 P3 Gull Awards. Ulven opened for Clairo in Dublin and Paris in September 2018. Ulven released her debut EP, Chapter 1, on 14 September 2018. Ulven released the standalone single "We Fell in Love in October" in November 2018, which would peak at number 14 on the US Rock Charts in October 2019.

Ulven embarked on her first North American tour supporting Conan Gray in March 2019. She released Chapter 2, her second EP, as well as Beginnings, a compilation of her entire single catalogue into one exclusively vinyl album, on 6 September 2019 through the music company AWAL. She embarked on her first international headlining "World in Red" tour in September 2019, performing in cities such as Dublin and San Francisco. Ulven was nominated for Newcomer of the Year at the 2019 P3 Gull Awards.

=== 2020–2023: If I Could Make It Go Quiet ===
In December 2019, Ulven signed a worldwide recording contract with British music company AWAL. In a rare phenomenon for most new label signees, her entire existing discography, which had all originally been self-released, was subsequently registered under this label on all digital music platforms. Ulven appeared on the front cover of both Gay Times and Dork in December 2019, as well as the cover of NME in January 2020. She provided the single "Kate's Not Here" for the original soundtrack of the 2020 supernatural horror film The Turning. Ulven was nominated for the Newcomer of the Year award and, as a result, the Gramo scholarship at the 2020 Spellemannprisen. In May 2020, Ulven was included in the annual Dazed 100 list after her single "I Wanna Be Your Girlfriend" passed 150 million streams.

In mid-2020, awareness of Ulven's artist persona became a way to identify as queer, as users of the online platform TikTok adopted the phrase, "Do you listen to girl in red?" to serve as a way of discreetly asking if someone is a lesbian, much in the same way a gay man could be identified as a "Friend of Dorothy".

In November, she released the standalone holiday single "Two Queens in a King Sized Bed", shortly before she was awarded "Artist of the Year" at the 2020 P3 Gull Awards. Ulven released her debut studio album, titled If I Could Make It Go Quiet, on 30 April 2021. The album has thus far been supported by four singles: "Midnight Love", in April 2020, "Rue" in August 2020, "Serotonin" in March 2021, and "You Stupid Bitch" in April 2021. The cover artwork for the album, made by Norwegian painter and artist Fredrik Wiig Sørensen, was originally an oil painting on a 80x80 cm canvas titled The Antizero. The artist was not credited in the physical release.

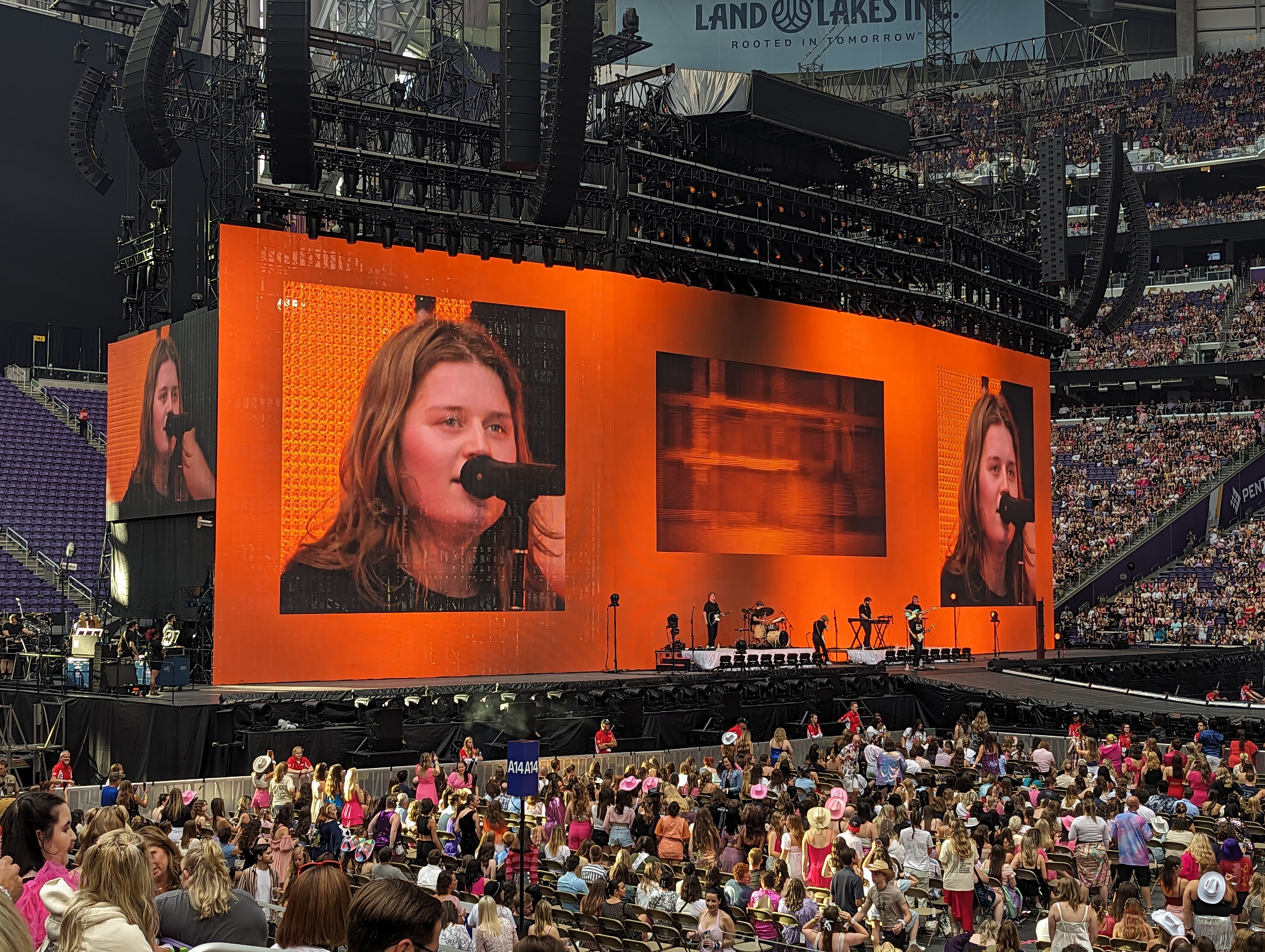
Girl in Red opens for Taylor Swift at The Eras Tour in Minneapolis

In 2022, Ulven signed to Irving Azoff's PRO, Global Music Rights (GMR). In February 2022, Ulven signed a record deal with Columbia Records, following the success of If I Could Make It Go Quiet. The label confirmed the signing to American media company Variety. At the 2022 Spellemannprisen, girl in red was named Spellemann of the Year, while If I Could Make It Go Quiet won Release of the Year and Songwriter of the Year. On 14 October, she released her single, "October Passed Me By", which is a sequel to "We Fell in Love in October". Ulven was an opening act on multiple shows of the U.S. leg of Taylor Swift's The Eras Tour (2023).

=== 2024–present: I'm Doing It Again Baby! and Blue ===
Ulven released her second studio album, I'm Doing It Again Baby!, on 12 April 2024. The album was supported by three singles: "Too Much" in February 2024, "Doing It Again Baby" in March 2024, and "You Need Me Now?" with Sabrina Carpenter, also in March. To support the album, Ulven performed on the Doing It Again Tour between April and October of 2024.

On 28 February 2025, Ulven released the song "Confession", a stripped-back guitar ballad that was described by NME as "reminiscent of her lo-fi earlier work". In June, she performed as an opener for the first night of BST Hyde Park 2025.

Ulven stars as the lead character, Maja, in the film Low Expectations. Produced by Maipo Film and directed by Eivind Landsvik, the film had its world premiere at the 2026 Cannes Film Festival.

In early October 2026, Ulven teased new material by recoloring the red sweater on the cover art of "We Fell in Love in October" to blue and changing her Instagram handle to GirlInBlue. On 9 October she released the single "Blue". Its music vide was filmed in Oslo, and was directed by her longtime collaborator Isak Jenssen. The four-track EP Blue followed on 23 October 2026, featuring "Blue", "Missing Person", "Worst Case" and "Clean Slate".

== Artistry and influences ==
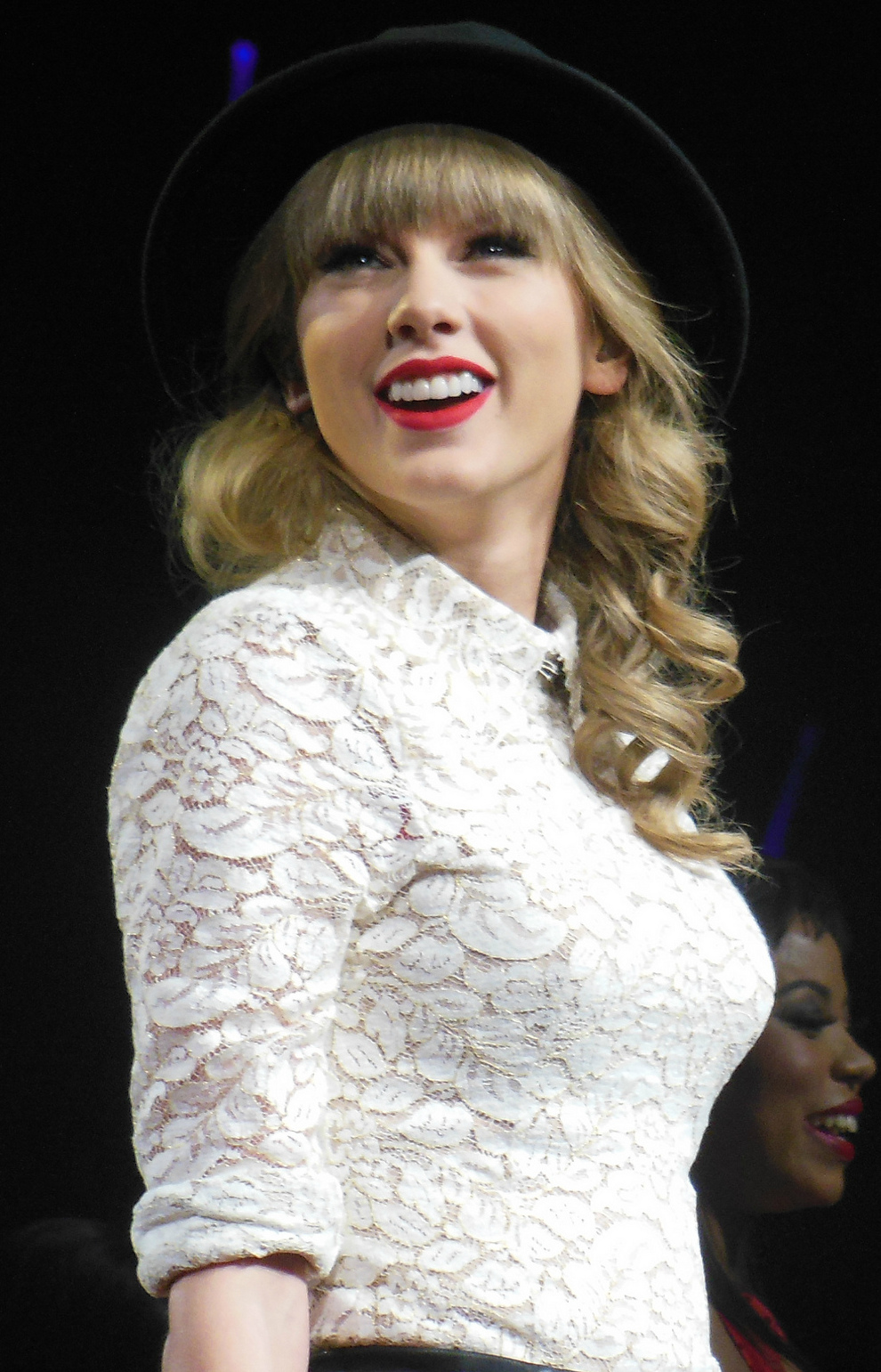
Girl in Red credits Taylor Swift as her main musical influence.

Ulven has been described as an indie pop artist, and her music has been described as pop, alternative pop, indie rock, dream pop, and lo-fi. The subject matters of Ulven's music range from romance and heartbreak to mental illness and the experience of being queer. Her experience with same-sex love is often a topic in her work, and she has been described as a "gay musical role model".

She named Taylor Swift as one of her biggest musical influences. She credits Swift's album Red for inspiring her to write music and pick up a guitar. Other artists that she has been inspired by or expressed admiration for include David Bowie, The Smiths, The Japanese House, and Fog Lake. In addition to music, Ulven has also been inspired by artists and literature, such as Patti Smith's memoir Just Kids and the works of Andy Warhol.

== Personal life ==
Ulven now resides in the Grünerløkka district of Oslo. She is a lesbian. She studied music production and songwriting at Westerdals Oslo School of Arts, Communication and Technology. Ulven revealed in 2021 that she has been diagnosed with obsessive–compulsive disorder and generalized anxiety disorder.

== Discography ==
=== Studio albums ===
Title	Details	Peak chart positions										Certifications
Title	Details	NOR	AUS	BEL (FL)	FIN	GER	NL	NZ	SWE	UK	US	Certifications
If I Could Make It Go Quiet	Released: 30 April 2021; Label: World in Red, AWAL; Format: Digital download, streaming, cassette, LP, CD	2	10	11	30	19	7	31	31	7	67	BPI: Silver
I'm Doing It Again Baby!	Released: 12 April 2024; Label: Columbia; Format: Digital download, streaming	14	—	34	37	—	— (Note: I'm Doing It Again Baby! did not enter the Dutch Album Top 100, but peaked at number nine on the Dutch Vinyl Albums Chart.)	—	— (Note: I'm Doing It Again Baby! did not enter the Sverigetopplistan Albums chart but peaked at number eight on the Sverigetopplistan Physical Albums chart.)	37	183	
"—" denotes a recording that did not chart or was not released in that territory.

=== Compilation albums ===
Title	Details	Peak chart positions	
Title	Details	NOR Vinyl	AUS Hit.
Beginnings	Released: 6 September 2019; Label: World in Red, AWAL; Format: Vinyl	6	8

=== Extended plays ===
Title	Details	Certifications
Chapter 1	Released: 14 September 2018; Label: World in Red, AWAL, Human Sounds; Format: Digital download, streaming, cassette	MC: Gold
Chapter 2	Released: 6 September 2019; Label: World in Red, AWAL; Format: Digital download, streaming	
Spotify Singles	Released: 8 September 2021; Label: World in Red, AWAL; Format: Streaming	
Blue	Released: 23 October 2026; Label: Columbia; Format: Digital download, streaming	

=== Singles ===
==== As lead artist ====
Title	Year	Peak chart positions										Certifications	Album
Title	Year	NOR	CZR	GRE	LTU	NZ Hot	POL	SVK	UK Sales	US Rock	WW	Certifications	Album
"I Wanna Be Your Girlfriend" (Note: "I Wanna Be Your Girlfriend" was originally published on girl in red's Bandcamp and SoundCloud in September 2017, before being released on Apple Music in March 2018.)	2017	—	—	—	—	—	—	—	—	—	—	IFPI NOR: Gold; ARIA: 2× Platinum; BPI: Gold; MC: Platinum; RIAA: Platinum; RMNZ: Gold	Chapter 1
"Will She Come Back"	2017	—	—	—	—	—	—	—	—	—	—		Non-album singles
"Dramatic Lil Bitch"	2017	—	—	—	—	—	—	—	—	—	—		Non-album singles
"Say Anything"	2018	—	—	—	—	—	—	—	—	—	—		Chapter 1
"She Was the Girl in Red"	2018	—	—	—	—	—	—	—	—	—	—		Non-album single
"Summer Depression"	2018	—	—	—	—	—	—	—	—	—	—	MC: Gold	Chapter 1
"4am"	2018	—	—	—	—	—	—	—	—	—	—		Chapter 1
"Girls"	2018	—	—	—	—	—	—	—	—	—	—	ARIA: Platinum; BPI: Silver; MC: Platinum; RIAA: Platinum; RMNZ: Gold	Chapter 1
"We Fell in Love in October" (Note: "We Fell in Love in October" was released as a two-song EP with the song "Forget Her".)	2018	50	73	76	42	—	63	80	63	14	104	IFPI NOR: Platinum; ARIA: 3× Platinum; BPI: Platinum; IFPI GRE: Gold; MC: 4× Platinum; RIAA: 2× Platinum; RMNZ: 2× Platinum	Non-album single
"Watch You Sleep"	2019	—	—	—	—	—	—	—	—	—	—		Chapter 2
"I Need to Be Alone"	2019	—	—	—	—	—	—	—	—	—	—		Chapter 2
"Dead Girl in the Pool"	2019	—	—	—	—	—	—	—	—	—	—		Chapter 2
"I'll Die Anyway"	2019	—	—	—	—	—	—	—	—	—	—		Chapter 2
"Bad Idea!"	2019	—	—	—	—	—	—	—	—	—	—	ARIA: Platinum; BPI: Silver; MC: Platinum; RIAA: Gold; RMNZ: Gold	Chapter 2
"Midnight Love"	2020	—	—	—	—	—	—	—	—	—	—	ARIA: Gold; MC: Gold; RIAA: Gold	If I Could Make It Go Quiet
"Rue"	2020	—	—	—	—	—	—	—	—	—	—		If I Could Make It Go Quiet
"Two Queens in a King Sized Bed"	2020	—	—	—	—	—	—	—	— (Note: "Two Queens in a King Sized Bed" did not enter the UK Single Sales Chart, but peaked at number 23 on the UK Physical Singles Chart.)	—	—		Non-album single
"Serotonin"	2021	— (Note: "Serotonin" did not enter the Norwegian Singles Chart, but peaked at number 1 on the Norwegian Airplay Chart.)	—	—	—	32	—	—	—	20	—	MC: Gold; RIAA: Gold	If I Could Make It Go Quiet
"You Stupid Bitch"	2021	—	—	—	—	36	—	—	—	—	—		If I Could Make It Go Quiet
"Body and Mind"	2021	—	—	—	—	29	—	—	—	36	—		If I Could Make It Go Quiet
"I'll Call You Mine"	2021	—	—	—	—	—	—	—	—	— (Note: "I'll Call You Mine" did not enter the Hot Rock & Alternative Songs chart, but peaked at number 24 on the US Rock & Alternative Airplay chart.)	—		If I Could Make It Go Quiet
"October Passed Me By"	2022	—	—	—	—	28	—	—	—	45	—		Non-album single
"Too Much"	2024	— (Note: "Too Much" did not enter the Norwegian Singles Chart, but peaked at number 2 on the Norwegian Airplay Chart.)	—	—	—	33	—	—	—	— (Note: "Too Much" did not enter the Hot Rock & Alternative Songs chart, but peaked at number 23 on the US Alternative Airplay chart.)	—		I'm Doing It Again Baby!
"Doing It Again Baby"	2024	—	—	—	—	—	—	—	—	—	—		I'm Doing It Again Baby!
"You Need Me Now?" (with Sabrina Carpenter)	2024	—	—	—	—	23	—	—	—	40	—		I'm Doing It Again Baby!
"Girlfriend Is Better"	2024	—	—	—	—	—	—	—	—	—	—		Everyone's Getting Involved
"Hemingway"	2025	—	—	—	—	14	—	—	—	—	—		Non-album singles
"Rødt hvitt blått" (with Marstein)	2026	2	—	—	—	—	—	—	—	—	—		Non-album singles
"Blue"	2026	—	—	—	—	—	—	—	—	—	—		Blue
"Missing Person"	2026	—	—	—	—	40	—	—	—	—	—		Blue
"—" denotes a recording that did not chart or was not released in that territory.

==== As featured artist ====
Title	Year	Album
"Malibu" (Lokoy featuring girl in red)	2018	Can We All Go to Bed

=== Videography ===
Title	Year	Artist(s)	Director(s)
"Girls"	2018	girl in red	Marie Ulven Ringheim
"We Fell in Love in October"	2018	girl in red	Peter Theisen Amlie
"I Need to Be Alone"	2019	girl in red	Isak Jenssen
"Dead Girl in the Pool"	2019	girl in red	Laura Lynn Petrick
"Bad Idea"	2019	girl in red	Isak Jenssen
"Rue"	2020	girl in red	Niels Windfeldt
"Two Queens in a King Sized Bed"	2020	girl in red	Niels Windfeldt
"Serotonin"	2021	girl in red	Marie Ulven Ringheim & Isak Jenssen
"Body and Mind"	2021	girl in red	Thea Hvistendahl
"I'll Call You Mine"	2021	girl in red	Marie Ulven Ringheim & Matias Tellez

=== Other appearances ===
Title	Year	Album
"Kate's Not Here"	2020	The Turning (Original Motion Picture Soundtrack)
"Something New"	2020	Moominvalley 2 (Official Soundtrack)

==== Television ====
Year	Television program	Role	Network	Notes
2021	The Tonight Show Starring Jimmy Fallon	Herself	NBC	Musical guest (episode 1454)
2022	Venner fra før	Vilje	NRK	Episode: "Den jævla festen"

== Awards and nominations ==
Following the success of her debut studio album If I Could Make It Go Quiet, the singer was nominated for seven awards at the 2022 Spellemannprisen, winning three of them: Spellemann of the Year, Release of the Year, and Songwriter of the Year. In this year, she also broke the record for the largest number of nominations an artist has received in the same Spellemannprisen edition. She is the most-awarded female artist in Spellemann history.

Award	Year	Category	Recipient(s)	Result	Ref.
BBC	2020	Sound of 2021	girl in red	Nominated	
Dork	2019	Hype List 2020	girl in red	First	
GAFFA Awards (Norway)	2018	Norwegian Newcomer of the Year	girl in red	Won	
GAFFA Awards (Norway)	2018	Best Norwegian Hit	"Girls"	Nominated	
Music Moves Europe Talent Awards	2019	General Award	girl in red	Won	
P3 Gull	2018	Untouched of the Year	"I Wanna Be Your Girlfriend"	Won	
P3 Gull	2019	Newcomer of the Year	girl in red	Nominated	
P3 Gull	2020	Artist of the Year	girl in red	Won	
Nordic Music Prize	2022	Best Nordic Album	If I Could Make It Go Quiet	Nominated	
Spellemannprisen	2020	Newcomer of the Year & Gramo Scholarship	girl in red	Nominated	
Spellemannprisen	2021	International Success of the Year	girl in red	Won	
Spellemannprisen	2022	Spellemann of the Year (Note: No nominees were announced for this award.)	girl in red	Won	
Spellemannprisen	2022	Release of the Year (Note: This category was presented as Album of the Year until the 2020 Spellemannprisen.)	If I Could Make It Go Quiet	Won	
Spellemannprisen	2022	Songwriter of the Year	If I Could Make It Go Quiet	Won	
Spellemannprisen	2022	Lyricist of the Year	If I Could Make It Go Quiet	Nominated	
Spellemannprisen	2022	Producer of the Year (with Mattias Tellez)	If I Could Make It Go Quiet	Nominated	
Spellemannprisen	2022	Alternative Pop/Rock	If I Could Make It Go Quiet	Nominated	
Spellemannprisen	2022	Song of the Year	"Serotonin"	Nominated	
Spellemannprisen	2022	Music Video of the Year	"Body & Mind"	Nominated	
Spellemannprisen	2024	International Success of the Year	girl in red	Nominated	
Spellemannprisen	2025	Songwriter of the Year (with Mattias Tellez)	I'm Doing It Again Baby!	Won	
Spellemannprisen	2025	Producer of the Year (with Mattias Tellez)	I'm Doing It Again Baby!	Nominated	
Spellemannprisen	2025	International Success of the Year	I'm Doing It Again Baby!	Nominated	
Spellemannprisen	2025	Alternative Pop	I'm Doing It Again Baby!	Won	
Spellemannprisen	2025	Song of the Year	"Too Much"	Nominated	
Telenor Culture Prize	2022	Telenor Culture Prize	girl in red	Won	
GLAAD Media Award	2022	Outstanding Breakthrough Music Artist	If I Could Make It Go Quiet	Nominated	
Libera Awards	2022	Breakthrough Artist/Record	If I Could Make It Go Quiet	Nominated	
Libera Awards	2022	Best Alternative Rock Record	If I Could Make It Go Quiet	Nominated	

== Tours ==
Headlining

- The World in Red Tour (2019)
- Make It Go Quiet Tour (2022)
- Doing It Again Tour (2024)

Supporting

- Fall Tour (2018) (Clairo)
- The Sunset Shows (2018–19) (Conan Gray)
- Happier Than Ever, The World Tour (2022) (Billie Eilish)
- The Eras Tour (2023) (Taylor Swift)
