= Girlfriend Is Better =

"Girlfriend Is Better" (live)

Single by Talking Heads

from the album Stop Making Sense
- B-side: "Once in a Lifetime" (live); "Heaven" (live)
- Released: November 26, 1984 (UK)
- Recorded: December 1983
- Venue: The Pantages Theatre (Hollywood)
- Genre: Funk rock
- Length: 3:32
- Label: Sire; Warner Bros
- Composers: David Byrne; Chris Frantz; Jerry Harrison; Tina Weymouth
- Lyricist: David Byrne
- Producer: Talking Heads

Talking Heads singles chronology
"Slippery People" (live) (1984)	"Girlfriend Is Better" (live) (1984)	"The Lady Don't Mind" (1985)

Official audio
- "Girlfriend Is Better" on YouTube

"Girlfriend Is Better" is a 1984 song by the American rock band Talking Heads, from their fifth studio album Speaking in Tongues (1983). The song's single version was a live version, recorded at The Pantages Theatre, Hollywood, from the soundtrack of their concert film Stop Making Sense (1984), named for a lyric from the song.

An edited version of the concert piece from the film was issued as "Stop Making Sense (Girlfriend Is Better)", in both 7" and 12" format, in November 1984.

A cover version of the song by Norwegian singer-songwriter Girl in Red was released as a single for the 2024 tribute album Everyone's Getting Involved: A Tribute to Talking Heads' Stop Making Sense.

== Critical reception ==
Rolling Stone's David Fricke described the song: "On the surface, 'Girlfriend Is Better' is a brassy, straightforward bump number sparked by Byrne's animated bragging ... and by the kind of rapid, zizagging synth squeals so common on rap and funk records. But the edgy paranoia smoldering underneath ... is colorfully articulated by guitar and percussion figures that burble along in a fatback echo, sounding like a sink backing up."

== Charts ==
Chart (1984)	Peak position
Australian Singles Chart	59
New Zealand Singles Chart	21
UK singles chart	99
