= Slippery People =

Single by Talking Heads

from the album Stop Making Sense
- B-side: "This Must Be the Place (Naive Melody) (Live)"
- Released: October 1984
- Recorded: December 1983
- Venue: Hollywood Pantages Theatre
- Genre: New wave, funk
- Length: 5:07
- Label: Sire
- Songwriter: David Byrne
- Producer: Talking Heads

Talking Heads singles chronology
"This Must Be the Place (Naive Melody)" (1983)	"Slippery People" (1984)	"And She Was" (1985)

"Slippery People" is a song by American rock band Talking Heads. It originally appeared on the band's fifth studio album Speaking in Tongues (1983). A live version of the song from the concert film Stop Making Sense was released as a single in October 1984 and became a hit in the Netherlands and Belgium.

== Background ==
In the liner notes for the band's greatest hits album Once in a Lifetime: The Best of Talking Heads (1992), drummer Chris Frantz wrote: "When this song was originally recorded on Speaking in Tongues, it had a funky and compact sound. This Stop Making Sense version is funky and big as a house (or should I say church?)"

The studio version of "Slippery People" was never released as a single, but a live version from Stop Making Sense was released as the lead single from that album. In this performance, Byrne plays a Roland G-303 guitar synthesizer.

"Slippery People" was also covered by The Staple Singers in 1984. Byrne plays the guitar on this version. Mavis Staples said that, "David’s inspiration was seeing people in church, and that’s what I connected with. My head went off into the Bible." Their cover peaked at No. 22 on the Hot Black Singles chart.

== Charts ==
=== Weekly charts ===
Weekly chart performance for "Slippery People" (Live)
Chart (1985)	Peak position
Belgium (Ultratop 50 Flanders)	16
Netherlands (Dutch Top 40)	7
Netherlands (Single Top 100)	4
UK Singles (Official Charts)	68

=== Year-end charts ===
Year-end chart performance for "Slippery People" (Live)
Chart (1985)	Position
Netherlands (Dutch Top 40)	50
Netherlands (Single Top 100)	56
