= Matias Tellez =

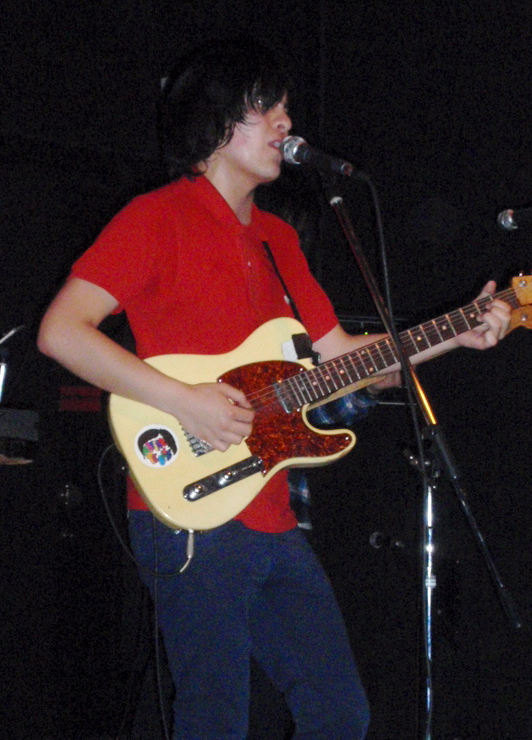
- Tellez performing in 2009

Background information
- Born: Matias Ernesto Leiva Tellez; 8 February 1989 (age 37)
- Origin: Bergen, Norway
- Instruments: Vocals; guitar; drums; piano; bass
- Years active: 2002–present
- Labels: Sony; Sounds Gold; Modular; Flake
- Member of: Young Dreams

Matias Tellez is a Norwegian singer-songwriter, composer and record producer. Tellez is one of the many young artists that the press have called the Bergen Wave. His music contains elements of pop, rock and Tropicália. He released solo music until starting the band Young Dreams, of which he is the principal songwriter and producer.

== Background ==
Tellez's parents, both from Chile, moved to Norway as political refugees, and his style is heavily influenced by South American sounds, bossa nova, Tropicália and artists such as Os Mutantes, Los Gatos, Jorge Ben, and Caetano Veloso.

Tellez started playing violin at the age of six and piano aged seven, but found what would become his preferred instrument when he picked up his father's guitar at twelve. At the age of thirteen Tellez entered the Eggstock battle of the bands with his band, Frustration To Creation, where he placed second, winning the opportunity to record a demo at Tinitus Studios in Bergen. The demo was heard by HP Gundersen and Kato Ådland, who had discovered Bergen bands such as Sondre Lerche, Nathalie Nordnes and Real Ones; they worked with Tellez over the following years.

== Career ==
Aged fourteen, Tellez released his first single 'Singing La la la la la' produced by HP Gundersen and Kato Ådland, on their label New Records. Tellez then played many concerts around Bergen including at By:larm 2004, which led to shows all over Norway including the Øya Festival in Oslo. From the age of thirteen to sixteen Tellez wrote and recorded 3 albums which were never released, but resulted in the EP 'Matias Tellez' on New Records.

In 2007, Tellez released his first full album, Tamias Mellez, on Gjøa Recordings/Sonet and through Flake Records in Japan. The album received modest reviews but featured the single Brand New Kicks which was entered into the national radio station NRK P3's annual new music competition Urørt. Tellez won the 2008 competition, which had been won the previous year by Ida Maria, and brought Tellez much national media attention and radio play.

In 2008, Tellez signed to Sony Music and on 16 February 2009 released the album 'Clouds', which reached number thirty on the VG Topp30 Album list. The singles from that album, 'Convicted' and 'Hello' both received heavy airtime on national radio

Tellez has played at festivals including Iceland Airwaves, By:larm, Hove and Bergen Fest and toured Japan in 2007 and 2009.

By the end of 2010 Tellez decided to stop performing as a solo artist and formed the band Young Dreams. He composed the music, produced and arranged their debut album which was released in 2013 by Modular Recordings. It won "Best Indie Album" at the prestigious Spellemannprisen, the Norwegian Grammy.

In August 2016 Young Dreams released the single Of The City, their first piece of music in three years.

In January 2018 Young Dreams released their second album, Waves 2 You.

Tellez has also worked as a producer, mixer and arranger for: fellow New Bergen Wave bands, Kakkmaddafakka, Sondre Lerche, Razika, Chain Wallet and Real Ones, as well as Girl in Red and Veps.

In 2020 he was awarded Spellemannprisen as the producer of the year for his work with Girl in Red, Sondre Lerche, Kakkmaddafakka and others.

== Discography ==
=== Solo albums ===
- Clouds (Sony 2009)
- Tamias Mellez (New Records/Sonet 2007)

=== Solo singles ===
- Convicted (Sony 2008)
- Brand New Kicks (Flake 2007 Japan only)
- Yes Indeed (Gjøa Recordings/Sonet 2007)
- Singing La la la la la (New Records 2003)

=== Young Dreams albums ===
- Young Dreams – Between Places (Modular 2013)
- Young Dreams – Waves 2 You (Blanca Records 2018)

=== Young Dreams singles ===
- Young Dreams – Wildwind (Blanca Records 2017)
- Young Dreams – My Brain on Love (Blanca Records 2017)
- Young Dreams – Cells (Blanca Records 2017)
- Young Dreams – Sinner (I'm Sorry) (Blanca Records 2017)
- Young Dreams – Of The City (Blanca Records 2016)
- Young Dreams – Fog Of War (Modular 2013)
- Young Dreams – First Days Of Something (Modular 2013)
- Young Dreams – Footprints (Modular 2013)

=== Produced/Mixed ===
- Chain Wallet – Chain Wallet (Jansen Plateproduksjon 2016)
- Chain Wallet – Muted Colors (Jansen Plateproduksjon 2016)
- Chain Wallet – Faded Fight (Jansen Plateproduksjon 2016)
- Young Dreams – Of The City (Blanca Records 2016)
- Verdensrommet – Aldri Igjen (Nabovarsel 2016)
- Svømmebasseng – Følger Deg Hjem (Svømmebasseng 2016)
- Marinius – I Like It With You (Diamond Club 2016)
- Andre Øy – Popup (Bad Vibes 2016)
- Lamark – Kroppspoesi (Lamark 2016)
- Misty Coast – Funny World (Diamond Club 2016)
- Marinius – Restate Your Mind (Tik 2016)
- Sondre Lerche – Despite The Night (Mona 2015)
- Sondre Lerche – Hotline Bling (Drake cover) (Mona 2015)
- Chain Wallet – Shade (Nabovarsel 2015)
- Nathalie Nordnes – You Will Live Forever (Diamond Club 2015)
- Lamark – Du Inspirer Mæ (Forbi Records 2015)
- Hjerteslag – Romvesen (Eget Selskap 2015)
- Hjerteslag – Møhlenpris Motell (Eget Selskap 2015)
- Karl Morris – Resignert (Karl Morris 2015)
- Johannes Holtmon – Sushisosialisme (Diamond Club 2015)
- Marble Pools – Marble Pools EP (Tender 2015)
- Hjerteslag – Møhlenpris Motell (Eget Selskap 2015)
- Chain Wallet – Shade (Nabovarsel 2015)
- Nathalie Nordnes – You Will Live Forever (Diamond Club 2015)
- Lamark – Du Inspirer Mæ (Lamark 2015)
- Hjerteslag – Laseronens Vår (Eget Selskap 2014)
- Hjerteslag -Ikkje Tenk På Det (Eget Selskap 2014)
- Marble Pools – Windowpanes (Tender 2014)
- Bloody Beach – Bloody Beach Pirate Radio Presents (Nabovarsel 2014)
- Sondre Lerche – Sentimentalist (Mona 2014)
- Sondre Lerche – Lucifer (Mona 2014)
- Sondre Lerche – At A Loss For Words (Mona 2014)
- Sondre Lerche – Lucky Guy (Mona 2014)
- Sondre Lerche – Logging Off (Mona 2014)
- Anja Elena Viken – Herfra Til Imorgen (Cosmos 2014)
- Chain Wallet – Stuck in the Fall/Same Place (Nabovarsel 2014)
- Alexander Von Mehren – Natural Selection (Young Dreams Remix – Rhapsody on a Theme Of von Mehren) (Klangkollektivet 2014)
- Palmface – Waste A Day (Made in Haugesund 2014)
- Anja Elena Viken – Født Forbryter (Cosmos 2013)
- Anja Elena Viken – I Morgen (Cosmos 2013)
- Young Dreams – Fog Of War (Modular 2013)
- Young Dreams – First Days Of Something (Modular 2013)
- Young Dreams – Footprints (Modular 2013)
- Young Dreams – Between Places (Modular 2013)
- Verdensrommet – Sidelengs (Nabovarsel 2012)
- Young Dreams – Feels Like We Only Go Backwards (Tame Impala remake) (Modular 2012)
- Razika – Program 91 (Smalltown Supersound 2011)
- Young Dreams – Flight 376 (Tellé 2011)
- Young Dreams – Dream Alone, Wake Together (Tellé 2011)
- Bloody Beach – Quembo Que (Bloody Beach 2011)
- Real Ones/Razika – Ingen kommer unna politikken (Complainte Pour Ste Catherine) (Real Ones 2011)
