= Alan Smithee =

Pseudonym used by film directors from 1968 to 2000

Alan Smithee (also Allen Smithee) is an official pseudonym used by film directors who wish to disown a project. Coined by the Directors Guild of America in 1968, it was used until 2000 when it was largely discontinued. It was the sole pseudonym used by DGA members who were, on paper, directors of a film but were dissatisfied with the final product and able to prove to a guild panel that they had not been able to exercise creative control over its filming process. The director was also required by guild rules not to discuss the circumstances leading to the move or even to acknowledge being the project's director. The Alan Smithee credit has also been adopted for direction credit disputes in television, music videos and other media.

== History ==
Before 1968, DGA rules did not permit directors to be credited under a pseudonym. This was intended to prevent producers from forcing them upon directors, which would inhibit the development of their résumés. The guild also required that the director be credited, in support of the auteur theory, which posits that the director is the primary creative force behind a film.

The Smithee pseudonym was created for use on the film Death of a Gunfighter, released in 1969. During its filming, lead actor Richard Widmark was unhappy with director Robert Totten and arranged to have him replaced by Don Siegel. Siegel later estimated that he had spent 9 to 10 days filming, while Totten had spent 25 days. Each had roughly an equal amount of footage in Siegel's final edit, but Siegel made clear that Widmark had effectively been in charge the entire time. When the film was finished, Siegel did not want to take the credit for it and Totten refused to take credit in his place. The DGA panel hearing the dispute agreed that the film did not represent either director's creative vision.

The original proposal was to credit the fictional "Al Smith". However, the name was deemed too common and was already in use within the film industry. The last name was first changed to "Smithe", then "Smithee", which was thought to be distinctive enough to avoid confusion with similar names but without drawing attention to itself. Critics praised the film and its "new" director, with The New York Times commenting that the film was "sharply directed by Allen Smithee who has an adroit facility for scanning faces and extracting sharp background detail," and Roger Ebert commenting, "Director Allen Smithee, a name I'm not familiar with, allows his story to unfold naturally."

Following its coinage, the pseudonym "Allen Smithee" was applied retroactively to Fade In (also known as Iron Cowboy), a film starring Burt Reynolds and directed by Jud Taylor, which was first released before the release of Death of a Gunfighter. Taylor also requested the pseudonym for City in Fear (1980) with David Janssen. Taylor commented on its use when he received the DGA's Robert B. Aldrich Achievement Award in 2003:

I had a couple of problems in my career having to do with editing and not having the contractually required number of days in the editing room that my agent couldn't resolve. So, I went to the Guild and said, "This is what's going on." The Guild went to bat for me. I got Alan Smithee on them both. It was a signal to the industry from a creative rights point of view that the shows had been tampered with.

The spelling "Alan Smithee" became standard; the Internet Movie Database lists about two dozen feature films and many more television features and series episodes credited to this name. A persistent urban legend suggests that this particular spelling was chosen because it is an anagram of the phrase "the alias men"; however, this is apocryphal.

Over the years the name and its purpose became more widely known. Some directors violated the embargo on discussing their use of the pseudonym. In 1997, the film An Alan Smithee Film: Burn Hollywood Burn was released. In the film, a man named Alan Smithee (played by Eric Idle) wishes to disavow a film he directed, but is unable to do so because the only pseudonym he is permitted to use is his own name. The film was directed by Arthur Hiller, who reported to the DGA that producer Joe Eszterhas had interfered with his creative control. He successfully removed his own name from the film, so Alan Smithee was credited instead. The film was a commercial and critical failure, released in only 19 theaters, grossing only $45,779 in the United States with a budget of about $10 million. Rotten Tomatoes reports an aggregate critical rating of only 8% positive.

The film was nominated for eight Golden Raspberry Awards at the following year's ceremony. It won five awards, including Worst Picture. The harsh negative publicity that surrounded the film drew unwanted mainstream attention to the pseudonym. Following this, the DGA retired the name; for the film Supernova (2000), dissatisfied director Walter Hill was instead credited as "Thomas Lee", and Accidental Love director David O. Russell left the product credited to Stephen Greene.

Meanwhile, the name had been used outside of the film industry. It continues to be used in other media and on film projects not under the purview of the DGA. Although the pseudonym was intended for use by directors, the Internet Movie Database lists several uses as writer credits as well. Variations of the name have also occasionally been used, such as "Alan Smithee and Alana Smithy" (screenwriters for the 2011 film Hidden 3D).

== Uses ==
Historical uses of the "Alan Smithee" credit (or equivalent), in chronological order:

=== Film direction ===
The following films credit "Smithee"; the actual director is listed when known.

Film	Year	Director	Notes	Reference
Fade In	1968	Jud Taylor	Also called Iron Cowboy; shown in previews with Taylor credited, then shelved; issued in 1973 with "Allen Smithee" credited as director.	
Death of a Gunfighter	1969	Robert Totten and Don Siegel (separately)	Credited to "Allen Smithee".	
The Barking Dog	1978	Unknown		
Gypsy Angels	1980	Unknown		
City in Fear	1980	Jud Taylor		
Fun and Games	1980	Paul Bogart		
Student Bodies	1981	Mickey Rose	Produced by Michael Ritchie under the pseudonym	
Twilight Zone: The Movie	1983	Anderson House	Second Assistant Director Anderson House used the pseudonym for the first segment, in which actor Vic Morrow and two children were killed in a helicopter accident during production. This represents a rare instance where the "Alan Smithee" credit was taken by an assistant director.	
Dune	1984	David Lynch	Used only for the version as extended and edited for broadcast television. In addition to the "Smithee" directing credit, for the broadcast TV version Lynch's screenwriting credit goes to "Judas Booth" (a reference to Judas Iscariot and John Wilkes Booth).	
Appointment with Fear	1985	Ramsey Thomas		
Stitches	1985	Rod Holcomb		
Let's Get Harry	1986	Stuart Rosenberg		
Morgan Stewart's Coming Home	1987	Paul Aaron and Terry Windsor		
Ghost Fever	1987	Lee Madden		
I Love N.Y.	1987	Gianni Bozzacchi		
Gunhed	1989	Masato Harada	Used for the re-edited TV release in the United States	
Catchfire	1990	Dennis Hopper	Originally released in theaters as Smithee. A subsequent video release under the title Backtrack was Hopper's intended "director's cut", for which he received credit.	
The Shrimp on the Barbie	1990	Michael Gottlieb		
Solar Crisis	1990	Richard C. Sarafian		
The Guardian	1990	William Friedkin	Credited to "Alan Von Smithee" only for the version as edited for cable television	
Bloodsucking Pharaohs in Pittsburgh	1991	Dean Tschetter		
The Nutt House	1992	Adam Rifkin	Used by writers Scott Spiegel (as Peter Perkinson), Bruce Campbell (as R.O.C. Sandstorm), Ivan Raimi (as Alan Smithee Sr.), and Sam Raimi (as Alan Smithee Jr.)	
Scent of a Woman	1992	Martin Brest	Used for the version edited for in-flight viewing	
Maniac Cop III: Badge of Silence	1993	William Lustig		
Rudy	1993	David Anspaugh	Used for the re-edited TV release	
The Birds II: Land's End	1994	Rick Rosenthal		
The Journey Inside	1994	Barnaby Jackson		
National Lampoon's Senior Trip	1995	Kelly Makin	Alan Smithee is credited onscreen as the director of a pornographic video featured briefly in the film, "Forrest Humps"	
Raging Angels	1995	Unknown		
Smoke n Lightnin	1995	Unknown		
Heat	1995	Michael Mann	Used for the re-edited TV release	
Hellraiser: Bloodline	1996	Kevin Yagher		
Exit	1996	Ric Roman Waugh		
Dilemma	1997	Eric Larsen and Eric Louzil		
Le Zombi de Cap-Rouge	1997	Simon Robideaux		
Sub Down	1997	Gregg Champion		
An Alan Smithee Film: Burn Hollywood Burn	1997	Arthur Hiller		
Picture of Priority	1998	Unknown		
Meet Joe Black	1998	Martin Brest	Used for the version edited for in-flight viewing and cable television	
Wadd: The Life & Times of John C. Holmes	1998	Cass Paley		
The Coroner	1999	Brian Katkin and Juan A. Mas		
The Insider	1999	Michael Mann	Used for the version edited for television	
River Made to Drown In	1999	James Merendino		
Woman Wanted	1999	Kiefer Sutherland		
The Disciples	2000	Kirk Wong		
In the Wrong Hands	2002	Chris Johnston and James A. Seale		
Fugitives Run	2003	Philip Spink		
Eep! (Dutch: Iep!)	2010	Rita Horst	Credited as Ellen Smith, the only time a Dutch director asked for this credit. Ellen is a Dutch name that is pronounced similarly to Alan.	
Another Night of the Living Dead	2011	Unknown		
Old 37	2015	Christian Winters		
Anatar	2023	Lorenzo Dante Zanoni		

=== Television direction ===
- The Challenge (1970) initiated by Joseph Sargent, finished by George McCowen (credited on screen as Allen Smithee)
- Kate Loves a Mystery, "Love, on Instant Replay", directed by E. Arthur Kean.
- The Twilight Zone (1985), "Paladin of the Lost Hour" (1985), directed by Gilbert Cates.
- Tiny Toon Adventures had episode segments that were credited to "Alan Smithee"; 1990 segments "Pit Bullied" and "Duck in the Muck" were actually directed by Art Leonardi.
- A Nero Wolfe Mystery, "Motherhunt" (May 12 and 19, 2002), the fifth episode of the second season, with Charles B. Wessler believed to be debuting as director.
- Call of the Wild, 1993 CBS TV movie directed by Michael Toshiyuki Uno, starring Rick Schroder.
- Dalton: Code of Vengeance II, the second television movie (May 11, 1986) in the Code of Vengeance series, actually a mashup of two episodes of a failed series
- The Cosby Show, "You Can't Stop the Music", episode 22 of season 8 (1992), director unknown
- It's Academic (June 19, 2006); this episode had numerous credits attributed to Smithee.
- Karen's Song, first episode.
- Red Shoe Diaries, "Accidents Happen", episode 9 of season 1 (1993), directed by Mary Lambert.
- La Femme Nikita, "Catch a Falling Star", episode 16 of season 4 of Canadian television series, believed to be directed by Joseph L. Scanlan.
- Riviera, 1987 ABC TV movie intended as pilot, directed by John Frankenheimer.
- MacGyver, "Pilot", directed by Jerrold Freedman, and "The Heist", director unknown (1985).
- Moonlight, TV movie and pilot for an unsold series (1982) (not to be confused with the later CBS vampire series), directed by Jackie Cooper and Rod Holcomb.
- The O. J. Simpson Story, 1995 television movie directed by Jerrold Freedman.
- The Owl, 1991 television film credited to director Tom Holland when originally broadcast. Holland approved of the 46-minute television cut but disliked the extended 84-minute home video cut and credited it to "Alan Smithee".
- Last Exile, episode 21, animation director unknown.
- Eiken, second episode, director unknown
- Gunslinger Stratos: The Animation, first episode, assistant animation director unknown.
- Joker Game, second episode, director unknown.
- KonoSuba, episodes 4 and 9 (season 1), storyboard artist unknown.
- McClain's Law, "Requiem for a Narc", director unknown.
- Frankie Drake Mysteries, episode 8 "The Pilot", director Leslie Hope as Alanis Smithee.
- Tamayomi, episodes 6 and 11, director unknown.

=== Music video direction ===
- "I Will Always Love You" – Whitney Houston (1992) from the soundtrack for The Bodyguard, directed by Nick Brandt
- "Heaven 'n Hell" – Salt-N-Pepa (1994), directed by Marcus Raboy
- "Digging the Grave" – Faith No More (1995), directed by Marcus Raboy
- "Let's Get Down" – Tony! Toni! Toné! featuring DJ Quik (1996), directed by Joseph Kahn (often credited as "J. Whiskey")
- "Building a Mystery" – Sarah McLachlan (1997), directed by Matt Mahurin
- "I Don't Want to Wait" – Paula Cole (1997), directed by Mark Seliger and Fred Woodward
- "So Help Me Girl" (US version) – Gary Barlow (1997)
- "Hard Charger" – Porno for Pyros (1997), directed by Liz Friedlander and Geoff Nelson
- "Victory" – Puff Daddy featuring The Notorious B.I.G. and Busta Rhymes (1998), directed by Marcus Nispel
- "Kiss the Rain" – Billie Myers (1998)
- "The First Night" – Monica (1998), directed by Joseph Kahn
- "Sweet Surrender" – Sarah McLachlan (1998), directed by Floria Sigismondi
- "Reunited" – Wu-Tang Clan (1998)
- "Waiting for Tonight" – Jennifer Lopez (1999), directed by Francis Lawrence
- "The Future Is X-Rated" – Matthew Good Band (1999), directed by William Morrison and Matthew Good
- "Maria" – Blondie (1999), directed by Roman Coppola
- "Late Goodbye" – Poets of the Fall (2004)
- "Some Kind of Monster" – Metallica (2004), directed by Joe Berlinger and Bruce Sinofsky
- "Lose My Breath" – Destiny's Child (2005), directed by Marc Klasfeld
- "Death in Midsummer" – Deerhunter (2018), directed by Bradford Cox and Marisa Gesualdi

=== Other media ===
- Daredevil #338–342, a comics series published by Marvel Comics: Writer D. G. Chichester learned during a brief break from the series that he was to be replaced. For the five issues he was obligated to write, Chichester demanded an Alan Smithee credit.
- Team X 2000, a one-shot comic published by Marvel Comics, is credited to two writers. One being Sean Ruffner, the other being credited as "A. Smithee," is also believed to be D.G. Chichester.
- Strontium Dog, a 2000AD comic strip: In 1996, writer Peter Hogan was dropped from the series and his episodes rewritten, and demanded that his name be removed from the credits.
- Marine Sharpshooter 4, a first-person shooter game, had Alan Smithee listed as the Art Director.
- Alan Smithee was credited as the director and included in the title of three adult movies in the early 2000s.
- A comical teaser for the video game Metal Gear Solid 4 shown at E3 2005 has a director's chair labeled "Alan Smithee" as the director of the name before falls off, being replaced by co-writer Shuyo Murata's name as Murata sits on the chair. The chair was ultimately changed again to display Hideo Kojima's name as Solid Snake sits on it however. This is a reference to Kojima's negative attitude towards directing the series and how he felt he had to keep directing it in spite of this.
- In the loose-leaf 1990s run of Who's Who in the DC Universe, the art for Elasti-Girl is partially credited to Alan Smithee.
- Equinox, a video game released by Sony Imagesoft for the Super Nintendo Entertainment System in 1993, credits Alan Smithee as director.
- The series premiere of Anatole, "Anatole's Parisian Adventure", credits Alan Smithee as the writer.
- NHL Hitz 2003, a 2002 video game released by Midway for the PlayStation 2, Xbox and GameCube, credits Alan Smithee as the color commentator.
- 2007 Issue of Inside Tennis magazine in place of the usual Art Director spot of the masthead.
- In the making-of documentary about the production and release of 12 Monkeys, director Terry Gilliam draws a doodle illustrating his frustration at unexpectedly poor test screening surveys, then decides the drawing is not up to his usual standards and so signs it 'Alan Smithee', explaining the history of the name as he does so.
- In the game Fire Emblem Heroes, the artist for the Mythic Hero Elimine is credited as "Alan Smithee".
- The Elusive David Agnew, a mockumentary included as a bonus feature on the DVD release of the Doctor Who serial The Invasion of Time, is credited as having been directed by "Allen Smithee". This use of the pseudonym is in reference to "David Agnew" itself being a pseudonym under which Doctor Who producer Graham Williams and script editor Anthony Read were credited for their writing work on The Invasion of Time.
- Annie-B Parson and Paul Lazar co-created the dance-theater work Alan Smithee Directed This Play for Parson's company Big Dance Theater.
- In the anime series Petals of Reincarnation, a mysterious, faceless character named Alan Smithee is introduced in the ninth episode as the entity who created the "Branches of Reincarnation"."Petals of Reincarnation 1×9 and 1×10 Review". The Geekiary.

== Other pseudonyms ==
- In several BBC television drama programmes in the 1970s, writers used the pseudonym "David Agnew". The pseudonym was used for reasons similar to usage of Alan Smithee.
- The 1976 Doctor Who serial The Brain of Morbius was credited to writer "Robin Bland". After Terrance Dicks' original script was heavily rewritten by script editor Robert Holmes, Dicks demanded that his name be removed and credit be given to a "bland pseudonym".
- The 1977 TV series Logan's Run was so heavily rewritten, screenwriter David Gerrold was credited as "Noah Ward", sounding like "no award".
- City Heat (1984) as originally released in theaters, fired director Blake Edwards had his screenwriting credit changed to "Sam O. Brown" (a nod to another of his films, S.O.B.).
- Solar Crisis (1990) credited Tedi Sarafian, the son of the director (himself credited as "Alan Smithee") and one of the writers, as "Crispan Bolt".
- Showgirls (1995) as edited for television, directed by Paul Verhoeven (who used the pseudonym "Jan Jensen", instead of "Smithee"). However, the edited, R-rated version of Showgirls that was prepared for release at Blockbuster was supervised and authorized by Verhoeven, and this version carries the director's name.
- Highball (1997), after a falling-out with the film's producer left it released in an unfinished state, Noah Baumbach had his directing credit changed to "Ernie Fusco" and his writing credit changed to "Jesse Carter".
- Supernova (2000), dissatisfied director Walter Hill was credited as "Thomas Lee".
- Accidental Love (2015) originally filmed in 2008, director David O. Russell left the film in 2010, later disowning it while the directing credit was changed to "Stephen Greene".
- Exposed (2016): during the editing process Lionsgate changed the story's focus. Gee Malik Linton is the director of the film; however, he is listed under the pseudonym of "Declan Dale".

== See also ==
- WGA screenwriting credit system
- Category:Films credited to Alan Smithee
- Category:Music videos credited to Alan Smithee
- Cordwainer Bird, a literary equivalent employed by author Harlan Ellison
- Damnatio memoriae
