= Fade In (film) =

1973 American film directed by Jud Taylor

- Written by: Jerrold L. Ludwig; Mart Crowley (uncredited)
- Directed by: Jud Taylor (Note: Credited as Alan Smithee.)
- Starring: Burt Reynolds; Barbara Loden
- Music by: Ken Lauber
- Country of origin: United States
- Original language: English

Production
- Producers: Judd Bernard; Silvio Narizzano
- Cinematography: William A. Fraker
- Editors: Aaron Stell; John W. Wheeler
- Running time: 92 minutes
- Production company: Paramount Pictures
- Budget: $400,000

Original release
- Network: CBS
- Release: November 8, 1973

Fade In is a 1968 American romantic drama film starring Burt Reynolds and Barbara Loden, released in 1973. It was filmed in tandem with the Silvio Narizzano film Blue, with its actors appearing unbilled in various scenes.

When the film was released in 1973, it was credited to the pseudonym Alan Smithee (though the onscreen credit reads "Allen Smithee"), making it the earliest film to be shot to use that pseudonym. It had initially been created for the film Death of a Gunfighter, which was released in 1969.

== Plot ==
A large movie production crew makes camp in Moab, Utah, to shoot a period western, and enlists several locals to assist the production. Rob owns a ranch that is being used as a location, and he offers himself and his friends Russ and Bud to work as drivers for the cast and crew. His first passenger is Jean, who is the assistant editor for the project, and they develop instant chemistry. On her first night in town, after driving her and other cast to dinner, Jean gets inebriated, and Rob walks her home. During their walk, they are interrupted by Phil and Norman, two acquaintances of his; Phil, very drunk, attempts to insert himself into their company. Rob coldcocks him and tells the two of them to go home. He assures her that it's not a serious matter.

Rob, bemused by all the unseen details of a film shoot, hangs around the set by day, and Jean, feeling out of place in a small town, keeps regular company with him at night and on off days. She demonstrates her job to him, at one point using raw footage from the shoot to demonstrate the Kuleshov effect - how the choices of what images follow each other determine the viewer's emotional response. He in turn later tries to show off for her, riding wild horses in a rodeo setting, being thrown off quickly but maintaining his humor. They play around with costumes and props and carry on trysts on location during downtime. On another evening stroll, Phil and Norman confront Rob again, with two more men with them, and after exchanging tense words, Rob is jumped into a full brawl. However, he quickly recuperates by swimming with her where the fight took place.

After an evening of sex at her motel, Jean gets a call from Bill, her friend with benefits from Los Angeles, who tells her he is coming to the location to visit. As the conversation goes on, Rob gets dressed and leaves. He keeps his distance from her as Bill comes to town. However, during their evening out, Jean finds herself disinterested in Bill's conversation, and goes back to Rob's ranch, finding him outside sulking. They argue over her previous sexual relationship with him and that he has developed serious feelings for her, but they ultimately have sex again.

The production wraps. Rob and Jean are resigned to their relationship ending with the exodus of the crew. He watches her plane leave, reflecting on his emotional journey.

== Cast ==
- Burt Reynolds as Rob
- Barbara Loden as Jean
- Patricia Casey as Pat
- Noam Pitlik as Russ
- James Hampton as Bud
- Joseph V. Perry as George
- Lawrence Heller as Stu

== Production ==
In a 1973 interview with writer Emory Lewis, playwright Mart Crowley stated, "I did write one film, Fade-In, with Barbara Loden and Burt Reynolds in starring roles. However, it was butchered by other writers. It was never released. I paid Paramount $1700 to take my name off the project."

Filming started in July 1967 and was shot at the same time as the Western Blue on the same location in Moab, Utah, using some footage from that movie although it had a separate story, cast and crew. Judd Bernard, who produced both, said "Both pictures are either going to be great or be disaster areas. There will be no middle ground with either one." Parts of the film were shot at Professor Valley, Castle Valley, Hittle Bottom, Moab, Dead Horse Point, and Arches in Utah.

It was the first Hollywood made film to show someone taking a contraception pill.

== Reception ==
"It was screened for Bob Evans at Paramount and I think he locked it up in chains", said Reynolds years later. "It's never been heard from since."

Five years after its intended release, Fade-In premiered on television on The CBS Late Movie on November 8, 1973.

Reynolds' opinion of the film often vacillated. After he finished production, he proclaimed, "It's the best thing I've ever done...An American version of A Man and a Woman." A few years later, after Paramount had cancelled its release and relegated it to late night television, he ruefully said, "It should have been called Fade Out."
