= Here Lies Love =

2010 album by David Byrne and Fatboy Slim

Soundtrack album by David Byrne and Fatboy Slim
- Released: 5 April 2010
- Recorded: 2008–2009
- Studio: South Hell (New York City)
- Length: 90:06
- Label: Todomundo; Nonesuch
- Producer: David Byrne; Fatboy Slim; Cagedbaby (Thomas Gandey); Patrick Dillett; Los Amigos Invisibles

David Byrne chronology
Everything That Happens Will Happen on This Tour – David Byrne on Tour: Songs of David Byrne and Brian Eno (2009)	Here Lies Love (2010)	Live at Carnegie Hall (2012)

Fatboy Slim chronology
Palookaville (2004)	Here Lies Love (2010)	Bem Brasil (2014)

Singles from Here Lies Love
- 1. "Please Don't" Released: 19 January 2010

Professional ratings
Aggregate scores
Source	Rating
Metacritic	64/100
Review scores
Source	Rating
AllMusic	4/5 stars
The A.V. Club	B+
The Daily Telegraph	4/5 stars
Entertainment Weekly	B
Mojo	2/5 stars
NME	4/5 stars
Pitchfork	5.0/10
Q	4/5 stars
Rolling Stone	3/5 stars
The Times	4/5 stars

Here Lies Love is a concept album and rock musical made in collaboration between musicians David Byrne and Fatboy Slim, about the life of the former First Lady of the Philippines Imelda Marcos along with the woman who raised her—Estrella Cumpas—and follows Marcos until she and her family were forced to leave the Philippines. The album features 22 guest vocalists and was released on 5 April 2010, under Nonesuch Records and Todomundo in several formats, including a deluxe double-Compact Disc set with a DVD of music videos from the album and a 120-page book.

The album was adapted as a rock musical that premiered in 2013 off-Broadway at The Public Theater and ran again at the Public in 2014–2015. It also played at the Royal National Theatre's Dorfman Theatre in 2014–2015 and the Seattle Repertory Theatre in 2017. It opened on Broadway in 2023.

== Background ==
The title of the album is taken from a comment made by Imelda during a visit to her husband Ferdinand Marcos' embalmed body. Imelda expressed that she would like the phrase "Here Lies Love" to be inscribed on her tombstone. David Byrne released the following statement regarding this album:

The story I am interested in is about asking what drives a powerful person—what makes them tick? How do they make and then remake themselves? I thought to myself, wouldn't it be great if—as this piece would be principally composed of clubby dance music—one could experience it in a club setting? Could one bring a "story" and a kind of theatre to the disco? Was that possible? If so, wouldn't that be amazing!

== Recording and release ==
The studio album features female singers including Cyndi Lauper, Tori Amos, Martha Wainwright, Natalie Merchant, Sia, Santigold, Charmaine Clamor, Nicole Atkins, Sharon Jones, St. Vincent, Kate Pierson, Florence Welch, Allison Moorer, and Nellie McKay, alternately playing the roles of Imelda Marcos and Estrella Cumpas. "It's a series of 22 very danceable songs…" wrote Byrne, "…and is sung by 20, count 'em, 20, amazing singers. A theater piece for your ears."

Byrne described Cyndi Lauper's performance as "amazingly fine-tuned" and "very impressive." The only male vocalists are Steve Earle on "A Perfect Hand", and Byrne himself on "American Troglodyte" and "Seven Years", the latter a duet with Shara Nova from My Brightest Diamond.

The first promotional single was "Please Don't", featuring Santigold on vocals. The single became available on Byrne's website as a free high-quality MP3 download on 19 January 2010.

== Live performances ==
Here Lies Love
- A promotional poster of the performers from the album, illustrated by Scott Menchin
- Music: David Byrne with Norman Cook
- Lyrics: David Byrne
- Productions: 2006 Adelaide Bank Festival of Arts; 2007 Carnegie Hall Perspectives Series; 2013 The Public Theater

Here Lies Love was performed live four times before the album was released. It was first presented as a song cycle (with vocals by Byrne, Dana Diaz-Tutaan and Ganda Suthivarakom) at the Adelaide Festival of Arts under the artistic direction of Brett Sheehy in Adelaide, Australia, on 10 March 2006 with additional dates on 13 and 14 March, and was also performed live at the Carnegie Hall in New York City on 3 February 2007, as part of the Carnegie Hall Perspectives Series.

== Track listing ==
Disc 1
No.	Title	Featured vocalist(s)	Length
1.	"Here Lies Love"	Florence Welch	5:51
2.	"Every Drop of Rain"	Candie Payne & St. Vincent	5:34
3.	"You'll Be Taken Care Of"	Tori Amos	3:19
4.	"The Rose of Tacloban"	Martha Wainwright	2:33
5.	"How Are You?"	Nellie McKay	2:43
6.	"A Perfect Hand"	Steve Earle	4:57
7.	"Eleven Days"	Cyndi Lauper	2:43
8.	"When She Passed By"	Allison Moorer	3:49
9.	"Walk Like a Woman"	Charmaine Clamor	3:58
10.	"Don't You Agree?"	Róisín Murphy	3:19
11.	"Pretty Face"	Camille	3:23
12.	"Ladies in Blue"	Theresa Andersson	4:20

Disc 2
No.	Title	Featured vocalist(s)	Length
1.	"Dancing Together"	Sharon Jones	3:53
2.	"Men Will Do Anything"	Alice Russell	4:06
3.	"The Whole Man"	Kate Pierson	4:15
4.	"Never So Big"	Sia	4:00
5.	"Please Don't"	Santigold	3:58
6.	"American Troglodyte"	David Byrne	4:06
7.	"Solano Avenue"	Nicole Atkins	3:55
8.	"Order 1081"	Natalie Merchant	5:47
9.	"Seven Years"	David Byrne & Shara Nova	5:40
10.	"Why Don't You Love Me?"	Cyndi Lauper & Tori Amos	3:57

DVD videos
No.	Title	Length
1.	"Eleven Days"
2.	"When She Passed By"
3.	"Don't You Agree?"
4.	"Dancing Together"
5.	"Please Don't"
6.	"Order 1081"

== Stage adaptation ==
The album was adapted into a stage musical, directed by Alex Timbers, that premiered off-Broadway at The Public Theater in New York City in 2013. It starred Ruthie Ann Miles as Imelda Marcos, with Jose Llana as Ferdinand Marcos and Conrad Ricamora as Ninoy Aquino. The production played an extended run at the Public before closing in August 2013. It returned for an open-ended commercial run again at the Public in April 2014, closing on 4 January 2015. The production won five Lucille Lortel Awards in 2014. It was revived with direction again by Timbers, at the Royal National Theatre in London, opening in September 2014, and played a limited run through January 2015 at the National's newly renovated Dorfman Theatre. The production was nominated for three Olivier Awards in 2015, including Best New Musical.

A revamped production from the original creative team, with the intention of recreating the immersive elements in a proscenium theater, was staged at the Seattle Repertory Theater from 7 April to 18 June 2017. Conrad Ricamora and Melody Butiu reprised their roles from the original Off-Broadway cast as Ninoy Aquino and Estrella Cumpas, respectively, Mark Bautista from the London cast reprised his role as Ferdinand Marcos, and Jaygee Macapugay, who had been a replacement off-Broadway, reprised her role as Imelda Marcos.

The musical started previews on Broadway on 17 June 2023 and opened officially on 20 July 2023, produced by Hal Luftig, Patrick Catullo, Diana DiMenna, Clint Ramos and Jose Antonio Vargas. It recreated the immersive experience with a mostly standing-room format which, according to the producers, "transform[s] the venue’s traditional proscenium floor space into a dance club environment, where audiences ... stand and move with the actors". It is the first show with all-Filipino cast on Broadway.
