= Annie-B Parson =

American choreographer

- Born: 1958 (age 67–68); Chicago, Illinois, U.S.
- Education: Connecticut College (BA); Columbia University (MA)
- Occupations: Artistic Director of Big Dance Theater, Choreographer
- Spouse: Paul Lazar
- Children: 1
- Website: bigdancetheater.org

Annie-B Parson is an American choreographer, dancer, and director based in Brooklyn, New York. Parson is notable for her work in dance/theater, post-modern dance, and art pop music. Parson is the artistic director of Brooklyn's Big Dance Theater, which she founded with Molly Hickok and her husband, Paul Lazar. She is also well known for her collaborations with Mikhail Baryshnikov, David Byrne, David Bowie, St. Vincent, Laurie Anderson, Jonathan Demme, Ivo van Hove, Sarah Ruhl, Lucas Hnath, Wendy Whelan, David Lang, Esperanza Spalding, Mark Dion, Salt ‘n Pepa, Nico Muhly, and the Martha Graham Dance Co.

== Early life and education ==
Parson received her BA in Dance from Connecticut College in New London, Connecticut in 1980.

She received her master's degree Columbia University/Teacher's College in 1983.

== Big Dance Theater ==
Parson founded Big Dance Theater in 1991 with Molly Hickok and Paul Lazar. She has since choreographed and co-created dozens of works for the company, ranging from pure dance pieces to adaptations of plays and literature, to original works combining wildly disparate materials. Her work with Big Dance has been commissioned by the Brooklyn Academy of Music, The National Theater of Paris, The Japan Society, and The Walker Art Center. Parson describes Big Dance as "a group of people who are interested in pushing dance into the theatrical realm and pushing theater into the dance realm." To her, Big Dance has a "total greediness for all the pleasures of theater and dance" Critic Helen Shaw wrote of Big Dance as a "fluid gang of performers and designers clustered around the married co-directors, choreographer-director Annie-B Parson and actor-director Paul Lazar. The company is – as it says on the bottle – a hybrid group, ignoring customary divides between dance and theatre." The company began made up largely of women including Stacy Dawson, Molly Hickok, Tymberly Canale, Cynthia Hopkins, Rebecca Wisocky, and Kourtney Rutherford. This group ebbed and flowed with others joining in over the years.

The work of Big Dance is almost always non-linear, and frequently disinclined to have a narrative ("I don't think life is very narrative," Parson says. "Mine isn't. And the narrative elements that have happened in my life, as I look back on them, become more fictionalized.") In the words of Shaw, "the difference between a Big Dance Theater event and work by someone like, say, Richard Foreman is that Big Dance will send you into a trance state-and then shake its finger at you and wink."

When asked about the division between theater and dance, Parson said:

"The separation of dance and theater- this is a lifelong irritant for me! In my personal and very subjective timeline, the distrust in Western theater of dance all began post-18th c. Since then, we audience(s) have been increasingly subjected to mind-numbing, un-ironic, unambiguous “reality” on stage. The Ancients, 2000 years ago, those plays were all danced and sung; in Shakespeare's day- the actors danced; in classical Japanese theater the acting students begin with years of dance training. Our contemporary body-less, dance-less theater– it feels fear based, (but I tend to think everything is fear based so don't trust me on that!) But is it related to our Victorian fear of the body, fear of corporeality, of sex? Does the divorce stem from our bias of mind over body, rather than mind/body? But yes, the separation must have also to do with the modernists’ hierarchical crowning of the primacy of “the word”; the modernists held the word as honorable, while poor dance was considered tawdry, the work of whores and … women! The things that dance owns: ambiguity, layer, mystery, abstraction, the non-narrative— these are the work of the devil! They hide, they suggest, they imply, they don't have a morality or any answers. So, in my tiny corner, I have tried to resurrect dance in theater. Dance is the sacred object for me; it is to be held close and protected from harm, and restored to its rightful place in the pantheon of materiality."

=== Works with Big Dance Theater ===
==== Sacrifice (1991) ====
Sacrifice was the first of Parson's large scale works and her first work at Dance Theater Workshop, curated by David White, who would champion Parson's work for decades. Set in something like a beauty parlor, this piece incorporated some text from Harold Pinter and was accompanied by a score of repetitive gestures executed by five pairs of men and women.

==== The Gag (1993) ====
The Gag premiered at Dance Theater Workshop in 1993. This large-scale work was based on the myth of the Cassandra figure in Greek mythology and the piece incorporated the text of radical feminist writer Andrea Dworkin. Molly Hickok played the central role, starting a decades-long collaboration between her and Parson. The piece was also inspired by the writings Christa Wolff with text by Aeschylus, Pinter and Marguerite Yourcenar. It featured original music by Walter Tompson, performed live. Four monitors on the floor included footage of small scampering animal babies. The New York Times described The Gag as “a bouillabaisse of a theater-dance piece...There's a little Greek tragedy, a bit of Harold Pinter, a dab of Tennessee Williams and a large dose of fashion and comic high jinks.”

==== Bremen Freedom (1993) ====
Presented by the Cucaracha Theater, and originally made for NYU Students, Bremen Freedom, by the west-German playwright Rainer Fassbinder, told the story of Geesche, a woman so sick of being controlled by the men in her life that she methodically poisoned them, and ultimately herself. The Village Voice wrote that the production included “a little cabaret shtick, some cross-dressing, a few dollops of disjunction, plenty of stylized tableau-making, a pinch of Catholic imagery, several actresses playing the same role, a bit of lovely/creepy choral singing, and heaps of that unmotivated goofy dancing that made Brace Up such a hoot.” Although the reviews referenced some of the performative similarities to Cabaret, (Stacy Dawson as the Master of Ceremonies recalled Joel Grey), the Village Voice insisted that “these kids come on like innovators, not imitators, and they know how to deliver a spectacle piping hot.” Though highly choreographic, this work was the first “play” that Big Dance, a largely dance based company, had staged.

==== City of Brides (1995) ====
In 1995, Parson was featured in the Young Choreographers and Composers at the American Dance Festival in North Carolina. She was paired with composer Richard Einhorn and the two created “City of Brides,” performed by five barefoot women and accompanied by a complex score for piano, violin and cello based on Stravinsky's Les Noces. This would be the first “erasure” work, Parson's term for choreographing to a piece of music and then erasing it, so that while the music was never heard by the audience, the movement material that was inspired by his rhythms endured.

The News & Observer wrote that “Parson is a talent to be reckoned with.” A reviewer for the Toronto Arts Journal CallTime wrote that Parson was the “most refreshing voice among a new generation of choreographers,” and that her blend of dance and theater had “created a movement language which is accessible to any audience member regardless of age, race, gender, or previous knowledge of dance” The piece also played at the Dance Theater Workshop in NYC (1995), Fall for Dance Festival in NYC (2004), and the Spoleto Festival in Charleston, South Carolina.

==== Don Juan Comes Back from the War (1996) ====
Don Juan Comes Back from the War premiered at Classic Stage Company NYC in 1996. It was a joint production by the Classic Stage Company and the Cucaracha Theater, with Lazar and Parson as co-directors and her choreographing. The New York Times lauded their direction, writing that they had constructed a “witty and elegant interpretation” of Odon von Horvath's bittersweet play. The play follows Don Juan as he returns home from the first World War in search of his fiancé, who, unbeknownst to him, has died. Her ghost follows him throughout the play. Horvath, a Hungarian playwright who wrote in Germany until he fled the Nazis, set his play in the immediate aftermath of World War One, but the play is full of “philosophical jibes” at his enemies. Parson and Lazar animated these ideas with “highly stylized choreography and musical arrangements” (by Christopher Berg) that allude to both Don Juan and popular German music of the 1920s. The result might have annoyed Horvath, who was notoriously fussy about staging, but they probably let an American audience grasp his meaning, and certainly his moods, better than any more literal presentation could."

==== The Gas Heart (1997) ====
“The Gas Heart” (1921) is a Dada “classic” by Tristan Tzara, one of the founders of that movement. In the Big Dance rendering of the play the fierce comic, lyric text comes vividly to life with a staging that is distinctly choreographic and choreography that is distinctly theatrical. It is as if Tzara wrote the play for the Big Dance Company.

From NYTimes review, “The comic triumph Here is The Gas Heart, by Tristan Tzara, a witty Dadaist take on avant-garde sophisticates working, flirting, effortlessly executing impossible dance steps, looking as classy as Cecil Beaton portraits and exchanging superior sounding banter that is utter nonsense. Few Dada plays survive; this one is exquisite and exquisitely performed.”

==== A Simple Heart (1997) ====
This dance-theater adaptation of Gustave Flaubert's A Simple Heart follows the story of Félicité, a servant who watches as every being she is connected to slowly dies or leaves her. Parson cast two dancers (Stacy Dawson and Molly Hickock) as Félicité, who occasionally danced in unison, parallel, and sometimes split entirely while always remaining connected. They separate for the first time when Félicité dies. The piece employed minimal use of language, instead relying on “spare yet rich vignettes” to tell this simple story with a dry tenderness, intended to match the tonality of the Flaubert.

The Village Voice wrote that Parson and Lazar had created a “cold, compelling world of emotional disintegration.” A Simple Heart premiered at the GIFT Festival in Tbilisi, Georgia, in 1997. It was also performed at the Dance Theater Workshop, NYC, Classic Stage Company, NYC, Jacob's Pillow Dance Festival, Massachusetts, the Hitchcock Center, Dartmouth New Hampshire, Middlebury College in Vermont, Museum of Contemporary Art in Chicago, and the Spoleto Festival in South Carolina.

==== Girl Gone (1998) ====
Girl Gone, written by Mac Wellman with songs by Cynthia Hopkins, premiered at the Flea Theater in 1998, and ran at the Kitchen NYC in 1999. The play explores the possibility of constructing alternate realities as three teenage girls, Lissa, Lisa, and Elyssa, perform rituals with the goal of “going away” to a fantasy land. They are so successful that they bring much of the rest of their world with them.

In an article from the Village Voice, Parson and Lazar's working relationship was described as so close that theaters are often unsure of how to credit their work. For Girl Gone, Parson dreamed up dances inspired by Wellman's fanciful stage directions; “They do the Spinal Fusion,” writes Wellman, “They do the Full Cleveland.”

In describing the play, Time Out New York gave up on theatrical labels and instead turned to psychological terminology, writing that “the work is schizophrenic, manic, occasionally melancholic and, more often, hysteric.” Watching it was “both an alienating and enchanting experience.”

==== Another Telepathic Thing (2000) ====
Another Telepathic Thing was inspired by Mark Twain's morality tale “The Mysterious Stranger,” and is described as “a prismatic and complex dance-theater parable.” It was performed by Tymberly Canale, Stacy Dawson, Molly Hickok, Cynthia Hopkins, Paul Lazar, and David Neumann, and featured original music by Cynthia Hopkins. “At once cynical and spiritual, the work centers on a charismatic stranger whose visit shatters the peace of a mythic hamlet. The medieval setting is echoed by a contemporary Hollywood reality, with a script that braids Twain's sublime writing with ‘found’ text from years of auditions. It culminates in a subtle and startling exploration of the fragility of our human condition.”

The piece was performed at Dance Theater Workshop NYC, (2000), STUC Theater, Belgium, (2000), Performing Garage NYC (2000), Rotterdam, Ghent and Munster, Germany (2001), and the Walker Art Center, Minneapolis Minnesota (2002), where it was the first in the Walker's 2002 showcase of genre-bending performances aptly titled the “Out There” series. The end of the piece, in which Satan delivers a final address that describes human existence as nothing but “a homeless thought” and then disappears, was described by the Star Tribune as a "powerful, unflinching conclusion to this ontological meditation” The show was also extremely well received in Germany. Reviewer Susanne Lang described the stage as “a snow-globe that can be shaken to see the world, at least for a moment, through the dreamlike flurry of artificial snowflakes…everything is moving, everything is carried by the music.” The Münstersche Zeitung lauded the piece as a “highly successful mix of dance- and spoken-theater…acoustic spaces are created through speech and song, which seamlessly create a superstructure for the dance. By bringing this piece, Pumpenhaus has not only brought a premier to Münster, it has brought an exceptional piece of dance theater.”

Jonathan Demme filmed a live performance of the piece in 2000 at Dance Theater Workshop in NYC. The film was screened at the Baryshnikov Arts Center in New York in June 2015. In 2000 Big Dance won an Obie for the music in Another Telepathic Thing. This piece, considered a signature Big Dance work, was made into a book published by 53 State Press, which includes the text of the piece, drawings by Parson of the costumes and props, and interviews with the performers about how the work was generated.

==== Antigone (2002) ====
In 2002 Big Dance Theater created an adaptation of Antigone, their second collaboration with playwright Mac Wellman. It premiered at Dance Theater Workshop in New York and toured to On the Boards in Seattle, Washington, UCLA Live in Los Angeles, Kampnagel in Hamburg, Germany, Theater im Pumpenhaus in Muenster, Germany, the Museum of Contemporary Art in Chicago, Illinois and Classic Stage Company in New York, NY. The New York Times called the show a "curious and mesmerizing if largely impenetrable experience," and said that Parson had created movement "whose sprightly intelligence is itself meaning enough."

==== Plan B (2004) ====
Plan B, an original piece with text by Len Jenkin and the company, premiered in 2004 at the Walker Arts Center in Minneapolis.

"As in a well-cooked dish," wrote The New York Times, “ingredients blend in works by the Big Dance Theater, creating elusive flavors and textures.” Plan B combined elements from Nixon's Watergate tapes and the adult diaries of Kaspar Hauser, the 19th century “wild child” who was found at age 16 at the gates of the city of Nuremberg, after living abandoned in a German forest for 12 years. His subsequent socialization proved tragic. Lazar explained that the two texts connected when they discovered a section of the tapes where Nixon and his advisors were trying to find the right person to do certain things on their behalf. “What a perfect foil Kaspar might be,” said Lazar, “because he's so malleable and so innocent.” Add to those elements bits of the Old Testament, Kabuki dance and Taiwanese movie music and you have ‘Plan B,’ “a shimmering strand of evocative storytelling that manages to suggest a great deal about innocence in all its guises.” “Combining all these disparate sources might have been a recipe for disaster in the wrong hands,” writes Susan Reiter for the danceviewtimes, “but Big Dance Theater blends and transforms them with a sureness of vision... creating a work that tells a quirky, ambiguous tale with resonant strangeness and delicate beauty.”

Plan B also played at the Bonn Biennale in Germany (2004), Dance Theater Workshop NYC (2004), Under the Radar Festival in NYC (2005), and the Philadelphia Live Arts Festival in PA (2005).

==== The Other Here (2007) ====
The Other Here was an original work based on the writing of Masuji Ibuse. It was commissioned by the Japan Society, who asked that the piece in some way be engaged with Japanese culture. The director of the Japan society, Yoko Shioya, suggested they consider the works of Masuji Ibuse.

Parson and her team began with a selection of source materials- the Chekhovian stories of Ibuse, verbatim text from transcripts of American life insurance conferences, traditional Japanese dances, Japanese pop music, a large table and a zither. Slowly, through collective exploration, the themes between these disparate materials are discovered, and a story begins to emerge. A man trying to give a speech at a conference is interrupted to watch a hand clapping dance, to perform a dance of his own, and to receive the gift of a fish. The fish becomes central.

Theatre Forum noted that the piece, exists at that point of collision between form and substance” and that “the intricacy of that subtle emotional palette is one of [its] great strengths."

The Other Here was developed at the CUNY Festival of New Work in NYC, 2005. It then played at Lincoln Center Out of Doors (2006) and at the University of Maryland (2006). Its official premiere was at The Japan Society in February 2007.

==== Orestes (2009) ====
In 2009, parson served as associate director and choreographer for Orestes, a production by the Classic Stage Company in New York. The production, based on translations by Anne Carson, combined works by Aeschylus, Sophocles, and Euripides and was directed by Paul Lazar.

==== Comme Toujours Here I Stand (2009) ====
This original piece was inspired by Agnès Varda's 1962 French Nouvelle Vague black-and-white film, Cleo From 5 to 7, and was commissioned by the French Institute Alliance Française. The film follows Cleo, a young pop singer anxiously awaiting the results of a biopsy test for cancer. The film follows her in nearly real time for two hours, as she distracts herself with composers, lovers, friends, a fortune teller, and a soldier. The Big Dance production simultaneously honored, appropriated, reinvented, and departed from the model of the film. In the words of Philip Lopate, writing for the Performance Arts Journal, Parson “zeroes in on the very French (think of La Rochefoucauld) theme of humanity's egotistical cruelty.” When creating the piece, Parson used the screenplay, but didn't watch the film itself until late in the process, so as not to be (in the words of Lazar) “under the claw” of Varda's influence. The New York Times wrote that in the piece, “meaning accrues from a complex yet spare interplay of actions and objects: a French folk song, video by Jeff Larson, luscious costumes and props evoking French couture, even a razzle-dazzle dance routine that refers to choreography from a Godard film.”

The piece premiered in Les Subsistance's Ça Tchatche Festival in April in Lyon, France. It also played at Le Quartz in Brest, France, Le Theatre National in Rennes, France, MCA/Chicago, The Kitchen, NYC October 2009, and New York Live Arts, NYC. It is a signature work of the company and the entire company and design team won a Bessie for it in 2010.

==== Supernatural Wife (2010) ====
During a residency at the Getty Museum in Los Angeles in 2010, Parson and Lazar began working on Supernatural Wife, an adaptation of Euripides' play Alkestis. Parson edited the translation by Anne Carson to create a spare skeleton for the piece. The play is based on the myth of King Admetus, who is offered eternal life by Apollo on the condition that he send a surrogate to the underworld in his stead. His wife, Alcestis, volunteers. Parson describes the subject matter as primal: "matters of birth, death, grief, mourning and the gods." Supernatural Wife had its American premiere at the Jacob's Pillow Dance Festival in 2011. Ella Buff, the festival's executive and artistic director, noted that “by integrating material from far-flung sources, [Parson and Lazar] create their own mythology.” The piece pulled from Yiddish silent films, the physical score from Dean Martin and Jerry Lewis routines, video footage of a horse wrangler and a recording of a monologue by Rosalind Russell. Annie-B Parson made her Brooklyn Academy of Music debut in the Harvey Theater with Supernatural Wife in 2011. The piece toured to La Filature in Mulhouse, France, Les Subsistances in Lyon, France, Le Quartz in Brest, France, Théâtre National de Chaillot in Paris, France, and the Walker Arts Center in Minneapolis, Minnesota.

==== Ich, Kurbisgeist (2012) ====
Ich, Kurbisgeist was co-commissioned by The Chocolate Factory and Performance Space 122. It premiered in October 2012 at the Chocolate Factory in Queens New York, and later played at NYLA in 2013.

The show was created in collaboration with Playwright Sibyl Kempson, and was written in a language invented by the playwright, which no one in the world, except those involved in the production, speaks—or has any knowledge of.” This “impressively inscrutable” play is, in the words of the playwright, an “olde-tyme agricultural vengeance play for Hallowe’en.” The piece was set in the Middle Ages, in a largely barren land that seems to produce nothing but pumpkins, many of which were to be smashed during the performance.

When asked how Ich, Kurbisgeist fit into the history of what Big Dance does, Parson said she craved doing something where language was abstract as movement, something “tiny and intimate" and felt it should be seen "in some kind of site-specific, really, really intimate venue. I thought it needed to be something that you're very close to, so you're not just thinking of language as meaning, but you're also thinking of language as a kinetic experience, because the language is extremely kinetic.”

Writing for L Magazine, Alexis Clements noted that Parson and Lazar seem to “enjoy feeling like outsiders looking in on a culture or subject that they are not familiar with.” For them, there was a “value in the experience of having to acknowledge one's own ignorance,” it freed them to take in information that contradicted their previous ways of thinking, it allowed them to do something familiar in a wholly new way.

The New York Times wrote that “Much like the words spoken by Shakespeare's wily fools, the messages are scrambled. Yet the world of “Ich, Kürbisgeist” is whole, and surprisingly powerful. Sometimes the gut understands better than the brain.”

==== Man in a Case (2013) ====
Man in a Case, Parson's collaboration with dancer Mikhail Baryshnikov, premiered in 2013 at Hartford Stage and featured Baryshnikov, considered the greatest dancer of his generation, as a man who refuses to dance. Parson choreographed and directed the piece, which used her original adaptations of two lesser known Chekhov short stories, “Man in a Case” and “About Love”, in combination with live music, dance, and surveillance-style video footage. Baryshnikov's performance was widely lauded, and Elizabeth Bruce described the "melancholy crispness" of the performance as "utterly Chekhovian." The piece was performed at Shakespeare Theatre Company in Washington, D.C., Berkeley Repertory Theatre in Berkeley, California, ArtsEmerson in Boston MA, Broad Stage in Santa Monica, California, and the Museum of Contemporary Art in Chicago, Illinois.

==== Alan Smithee Directed This Play: a Triple Feature (2014) ====
Alan Smithee Directed This Play: a Triple Feature was co-commissioned by Les Subsistances (Lyon) and Brooklyn Academy of Music. It premiered at Les Subsistances in France in March, 2014 and then played at Jacobs Pillow, Les Subsistances, Tanz im August Berlin and Brooklyn Academy of Music.

The piece was an adaptation/ mashup of the films Terms of Endearment, Le Cercle Rouge, and Doctor Zhivago. It began when Les Subsistances suggested Annie-B Parson and Paul Lazar work with a short excerpt from the 1970 Franco-Italian crime film, Le Cercle Rouge. Wanting to work with other iconic films from other time periods and countries, they added Doctor Zhivago and Terms of Endearment. In classic Big Dance form, the piece wove together disparate performance styles, and included seven performers speaking text, dancing, and precisely performing the movements of actors from the films, which were, in turn, being projected on a large wall of blinds behind them. A moment of theatrical staging might be accompanied by an entire score of choreography, a dance might be underscored by fully staged theater. Parson says she is most interested in “simultaneous systems putting pressure on each other, and seeing what happens. That's the magic point.”

The name in the title, Alan Smithee, is the pseudonym used by the Directors Guild of America until 2000, when a director became so dissatisfied with a film that they could satisfactorily prove to the guild they had not been able to exercise creative control and therefore refused to take credit for the final product. He was then credited as Alan Smithee.

==== Short Form (2015) ====
Short form had its New York premiere at the Kitchen in January 2015, and was in part a celebration of the company's 25th anniversary. The show included five short works that focused on dance. The intermission was an onstage birthday party complete with games, food, and Lazar as M.C. The show was “Inspired by disciplines of the concise—novellas, folk tales, diary entries, pencil drawings, thumbnail sketches and the single page of a notebook,” and featured five works, that “embrace the brief, granular, close range, anecdotal and microscopic. Downsizing is prized.” The piece had its world premiere at the Solange MacArthur Theater in the American Dance Institute in Rockville, MD in 2015. Its New York premiere was at the Kitchen in New York, New York, and it toured to the Fusebox Festival in Austin, Texas.

==== This Page Intentionally Left Blank (2016) ====
This Page Intentionally Left Blank made its world premiere at the University of Houston Cynthia Woods Mitchell Center for the Arts’ CounterCurrent Festival 2016. This performance-based docent tour deconstructed “the role of the docent and museum audio tour via an encounter with theater and dance, subverting and reconsidering how the docent typically leads viewers to observe art in the museum context.” Big Dance sought to democratize the museum space, to “disrupt, awaken, dismantle, confuse and thus revivify the viewer's perception of art.” The audience wore headphones and toured the space in groups in groups of twenty, as the docent (Tymberly Canale) spoke about the art with a (“don't look at that,” she says at one point, “that's not part of the tour.”) The audience traveled from the Menil Collection's main building to Flavin's Untitled, 1996, described by Arts And Culture as “a kind of journey deeper into Tymberly's psyche as she worms her way into our own.” Movement and theater gradually begin to take over the piece, and ultimately, the audience became part of the performance.

The piece was also performed at Mass MoCa- the Massachusetts Museum of Contemporary Art, in January 2016.

==== Cage Shuffle (2017) ====
Cage Shuffle made its world premiere at Abrons Arts Center during the American Realness Festival in 2016. In Cage Shuffle Paul Lazar speaks a series of one-minute stories by John Cage from his 1963 score Indeterminacy while simultaneously performing choreography by Annie-B Parson. The stories are spoken in a random order with no predetermined relationship to the dancing. Chance serves up its inevitable blend of strange and uncanny connections between text and movement. With live tape and digital collage scored and performed by composer Lea Bertucci.

The piece was also performed at The Poets House in March 2017; David Bryne's: This Is How Music Works in June 2017; The Walker Art Center of Minneapolis in July 2017; A.P.E. Ltd. Gallery of Northampton in August 2017; Links Hall of Chicago in October 2017; DeBartolo Performing Arts Center of the University of Notre Dame, IN in October 2017

==== 17c (2017) ====
17c is the newest Big Dance Theater ensemble work, built around the 17th-century diaries of Samuel Pepys. Pepys danced, sang, strummed, shopped, strove, bullied and groped—and he recorded all of it in his diary. He recorded his bunions, infidelities, perversions, and meetings with the King.

In her latest piece, Parson and her team incorporated the diaries of Pepys', Margaret Cavendish's 17th-century radical feminist play The Convent of Pleasure, three centuries of marginalia, and the ongoing annotations of the web-based devotees at www.pepysdiary.com. The piece "dismantles an unchallenged historical figure and embodies the women's voices omitted from Pepys' intimate portrait of his life"

17c was presented as a work in progress excerpt as part of the American Realness Festival at Gibney Dance's Agnes Varis Performing Arts Center in January 2017. It then played at the Philadelphia Fringe Festival September 7–9.

In October it was presented at Mass MoCa, co-presented by Jacob's Pillow Dance in North Adams. Massachusetts. Its world premiere was in November 2017 at the Carolina Performing Arts in Chapel Hill, North Carolina, and its New York premiere was at the Brooklyn Academy of Music's Next Wave Festival in Brooklyn New York in November 2017.

==== The Road Awaits Us (2017) ====
Based loosely on an absurdist play by Ionesco, in this North American premiere, Annie-B Parson stages a birthday party for a company of esteemed dance elders, including Bebe Miller, Meg Harper, Keith Sabado, Sheryl Sutton, Douglas Dunn, Betsy Gregory, Brian Bertscher, and Black-Eyed Susan. This piece was originally created for Sadler's Wells Elixir Co.

Performance history includes Sadler's Wells, London, in June 2017 and NYU Skirball in November 2019.

==== Antigonick (2018) ====
Big Dance Theater's Antigonick is a rough cut of Anne Carson's one-act, radical-feminist, philosophical take on Sophocles’ Antigone. In Carson's theatrical perspective on Antigone's role as a humanist and antagonist, the intellectual excitement of Antigonick lies in how she loses, why her peaceful resistance matters, and the sobering consequences of the Antigone/Kreon face-off.

Big Dance Theater first workshopped this play, directed by Paul Lazar, in 2016 at Suzanne Bocanegra and David Lang's Home Theater. In 2017, Antigonick was commissioned and Originally Produced by Williamstown Theatre Festival with the support of Mandy Greenfield. The original group in the cast included Yvonne Rainer, Chris Giarmo, Kirstin Sieh, and Sheena See. Both of those iterations were directed by Paul Lazar and co-directed by Annie-B Parson, with original sound design by Chris Giarmo, and produced by Aaron Mattocks.

Antigonick was first performed at the Williamstown Theater Festival, Summer 2017. It also showed at Abrons Arts Center in November 2018.

==== ballet dance (2019) ====
Annie-B Parson takes on ballet with her own choreographic voice. Drawing from her experience of watching and re-watching Balanchine's Agon as well as the novel The Complete Ballet by John Haskell, she creates a duet from the imagery, the fundamental actions, the objects, and the narratives of ballet traditions.

Performance history includes the Spoleto Festival of Two World, Umbria, Italy in July 2019 and NYU Skirball in November 2019.

== Other notable projects ==
Outside of Big Dance, Ms. Parson has created choreography for marching bands, operas, pop stars, theater, ballet, docents, movies, objects, television, symphonies, and most recently for a chorus of 1,000 singers under the direction of Simon Halsey. Her work for theater, MTV, opera and film includes work by Laurie Anderson, Salt n Pepa, Nico Muhly, and such plays as Lucas Hnath's Walt Disney at Soho Rep, Sarah Ruhl's Orlando, Futurity at ART, as well as the string quartet ETHEL.

=== Here Lies Love (2013) ===
In 2013, Parson choreographed Here Lies Love, a musical based on Fillipina First Lady Imelda Marco's life that played at the Public Theater with music by David Byrne. Parson had been a fan of Byrne's since she had seen him perform in her college days. Admiration became collaboration; she choreographed two of Byrne's world tours even before they began working on Here Lies Love. Byrne wrote the lyrics, and the music was created by Byrne and Fatboy Slim.

Of the process, which was her first foray into traditional musical theater, she said: “Usually, in my own company or other concert work, I create from a formalist perspective, meaning I work with line, space, shape, and the time of dance itself. Dance is the sacred object. When I’ve created for David's concerts, I ask, ‘What does the music crave?’ But in Here Lies Love, the music and story are the top contenders for the throne, so I knew the dance had to serve those two. Therein lies the struggle— and the interest— for me in this project."

Parson studied Marco's movements, riffing on her trademark moves to create choreography so that the audience could see her signature gestures both live and on the TV screens playing historical footage. The resulting choreography offered diverse phrases that had “everything from boy-band step touches and hard-hitting club moves to gestural sections with lotus-flower hands and swaying luau hip circles.” The resulting mishmash created a striking visual effect, which was at this point known as a “Parson trademark.” Parson said that her way of working came from Merce Cunningham who “offered that sequencing and hierarchy of movement aren't important. I can do one move, then another, then roll the dice and switch it up.” The New York Times called her choreography "wildly diverse and witty."

==== Full list of other works ====
Ms. Parson created choreography for the Love This Giant Tour by David Byrne and St. Vincent, and for the Songs of David Byrne and Brian Eno Tour in 2008–2009. She also created dance for the Digital Witness Tour by St. Vincent in 2014–2016. She directed and choreographed for the string quartet Ethel. Her dances are featured in the film Ride, Rise, Roar about David Byrne. She choreographed for Nico Muhly's opera Dark Sisters, Walt Disney at Soho Rep, Sarah Ruhl's Orlando, Futurity at ART, The Broken Heart at TFNA, David Bowie's Lazarus, full-length work for The Martha Graham Dance Co. and a solo for Wendy Whelan at The Linbury/Royal Opera House

- "I used to love you" (2017) Choreographed by Parson for the Martha Graham Dance Co, this work was based on Graham's rarely seen 1941 Punch and Judy. It served to re-think and deconstruct the Graham choreography.
- The Road Awaits Us (2017): Created for the Elixir Co, a company of Elders at Sadlers Wells in London, this work was born from Parson's fascination with absurdism in an absurdist age. Parson created a very skeletal and non-linear edit of Ionesco's The Bald Soprano for the Elixir Co. The performers ranged in age from 60 to 89, a group of veteran and loved dancers in the London scene. Parson ended the work with a slim edit of the elegiac fourth act of The Cherry Orchard.
- Short Ride Out (2016) A solo for Wendy Whelan for The Royal Ballet, this short solo was danced to the music of Julia Wolf. It premiered at the Lynbbery Theater in London in 2016.
- Goats (2016) commissioned by The Other Shore Dance Co., this work premiered at BAC in NYC and was later performed by Big Dance Theater at the Kitchen in 2016.
- The Snow Falls in The Winter: commissioned by The Other Shore Dance Co, (Brandi Norton and Sonya Kostich), this work based on The lesson by Ionesco premiered at BAC in NYC.
- 2016 public domain: the mostly Mozart festival/David Lang choral work
- 2016 Choreographer: David Bowie and Ivo van Hove: Lazarus
- 2015 Created a solo for Wendy Whelan commissioned by the Royal Ballet
- 2015 Created work for the Martha Graham Dance Company
- 2014–2016 Choreographer: St. Vincent: Digital Witness Tour
- 2013–2017 Choreographer: David Byrne: Here Lies Love
- 2012 Choreographer: David Byrne and St. Vincent: Love This Giant Tour
- 2008 Choreographer: David Byrne: Songs of David Byrne and Brian Eno Tour.
- 2010 Choreographer: David Byrne: Ride, Rise, Roar about David Byrne
- 2015 Choreographer: Rikki and The Flash, Philadelphia
- 2020 Choreographer: David Byrne: American Utopia (film).

== Teaching, writing, and curating ==
Since 1993 Parson has been an instructor of choreography at New York University's Experimental Theater Wing. She has also taught nationally and internationally including Tokyo and Spoleto, Italy. She was featured in BOMB magazine, and wrote a piece for Dance USA on the state of dance/theater in the U.S. As an artist-curator, she has curated shows including: the Merce Cunningham memorial, Dancer Crush at NYLA and Sourcing Stravinsky at DTW. Parson tours a lecture on abstraction called "The Structure of Virtuosity" to universities and for audience development. Her recent book, Dance by Letter, is published by 53rd State Press.

=== Drawing the Surface of Dance: A Biography in Charts ===
Soloing on the page, choreographer Annie-B Parson rethinks choreography as dance on paper. Parson draws her dances into new graphic structures calling attention to the visual facts of the materiality of each dance work she has made. These drawings serve as both maps of her pieces in the aftermath of performance, and a consideration of the elements of dance itself. Divided into three chapters, the book opens with diagrams of the objects in each of her pieces grouped into chart-structures. These charts reconsider her dances both from the perspective of the resonance of things, and for their abstract compositional properties. In chapter two, Parson delves into the choreographic mind, charting such ideas as an equality in the perception of objects and movement, and the poetics of a kinetic grammar. Charts of erasure, layering and language serve as dynamic and prismatic tools for dance making. Lastly, there is a chapter of photographs of Big Dance Theater from 1991 to 2019. As an addendum, nodding to the history of chance operations in dance, Parson creates a generative card game of 52 compositional elements for artists of any medium to cut out and play as a method for creating new material. Within the duality of form and content, this book explores the meanings that form itself holds, and Parson's visual maps of choreographic ideas inspire new thinking around the shared elements underneath all art-making.

== Awards, honors, and fellowships ==
Ms. Parson has been nominated for the CalArts/ Alpert Award seven times. She was a YCC choreographer at The American Dance Festival where she worked with composer Richard Einhorn to create City of Brides.

- 2020 New York Dance and Performance (Bessie) Award for David Byrne's American Utopia
- 2017 Center for Ballet and the Arts Fellowship
- 2015 Olivier Award nominee (London) for Best Theater Choreographer (Here Lies Love)
- 2014 Prelude Festival's FRANKY Award: Annie-B Parson & Paul Lazar
- 2014 Doris Duke Performing Artist Award
- 2014 Foundation for Contemporary Arts Grants to Artists Award
- 2013/2006/2000 New York Foundation for the Arts Artist Fellowship
- 2012 United States Artists Fellowship
- 2010/2002 New York Dance and Performance BESSIE Awards
- 2007 Guggenheim Fellowship
- 2011/2012 Lucille Lortel nominations
- 2000/2005/2012 NYFA
- 2007 Big Dance Theater receives the first Creativity Award from Jacobs Pillow
- 2000 Big Dance Theater awarded an OBIE
