= Here Lies Love (musical) =

2013 biographical musical

- Off-Broadway promotional poster
- Music: David Byrne; Fatboy Slim
- Lyrics: David Byrne
- Basis: Here Lies Love by David Byrne; Fatboy Slim
- Productions: 2013 Off-Broadway; 2014 Off-Broadway; 2014 London; 2017 Seattle; 2023 Broadway

Here Lies Love is a musical with music by David Byrne and Fatboy Slim, and lyrics by Byrne.

The biographical musical is based on Byrne's and Slim's concept music album based, in turn, on Byrne's research on the life of former Philippine first lady Imelda Marcos. The musical's score is described as "disco-pop."

== Productions ==
=== Early productions ===
Prior to the release of the initial concept album, Byrne presented the music as a song cycle at the Festival of the Arts in Australia in 2006, and in concert at Carnegie Hall in 2007.

Here Lies Love was first publicly presented as a musical at the Massachusetts Museum of Contemporary Art's Hunter Center for Performing Arts from June 21–24, 2012, in a co-production between MASS MoCA, the Williamstown Theatre Festival, and The Public Theater, in advance of the musical's run at the Public the following year. The workshop production was directed by Alex Timbers and featured much of the same creative team that would remain with the show, including David Korins as set designer and Annie-B Parson as choreographer. The cast included Maria-Christina Oliveras, Josh Dela Cruz, Carol Angeli, Jose Llana, Ruthie Ann Miles, Conrad Ricamora, and Zach Villa.

=== Off-Broadway (2013, 2014-2015) ===
Here Lies Love premiered Off-Broadway at The Public Theater in New York City in 2013 under the direction of Alex Timbers. It starred Ruthie Ann Miles in the lead role, with Jose Llana as Ferdinand Marcos and Conrad Ricamora as Ninoy Aquino. The production played an extended run at the Public before closing in August 2013. It returned for an open-ended commercial run again at the Public in April 2014. Ruthie Ann Miles departed the production on October 18, 2014, and was replaced by her understudy Jaygee Macapugay. It closed at the Public on January 4, 2015. The production garnered five Lucille Lortel Awards in 2014.

=== London and cancelled Australian production (2015) ===
The musical, directed once again by Timbers, opened at the Royal National Theatre in September 2014 starring Natalie Mendoza as Imelda, and played a limited, sold-out run through January 2015 at the National's newly renovated Dorfman Theatre. The London-based production was nominated for three Olivier Awards in 2015 (Best New Musical, Outstanding Achievement in Music, and Best Theatre Choreographer).

A further production was slated to be mounted at the Vivid Sydney festival in Australia in 2015. The production was planned to be staged in Barangaroo in a custom-built venue made out of shipping containers. Although Byrne visited Australia in November 2014 for auditions, the production was postponed and ultimately cancelled altogether "due to unforseen [sic] acoustical engineering issues."

=== Seattle (2017) ===
A revamped production from the original Off-Broadway creative team, with the intention of recreating the immersive elements in a proscenium theater, was staged at the Seattle Repertory Theater from April 7 to June 18, 2017 (extended from May 28 after strong ticket sales). Notable returning actors included Conrad Ricamora and Melody Butiu reprising their roles from the original Off-Broadway cast as Ninoy Aquino and Estrella Cumpas, respectively, and Mark Bautista from the London cast reprising his role as Ferdinand Marcos, replacing Llana who was touring in The King and I at the time. Jaygee Macapugay, who understudied and later replaced Ruthie Ann Miles as Imelda Marcos in the Off-Broadway production, reprised her role.

=== Broadway (2023) ===
The production began previews at the Broadway Theatre starting on June 17, 2023, before an official opening on July 20. Ricamora, Llana, and Butiu reprised their roles as Ninoy Aquino, Ferdinand Marcos, and Estrella Cumpas respectively. Arielle Jacobs starred as Imelda Marcos, with Jaygee Macapugay as her alternate. Lea Salonga played Aurora Aquino for a limited run from July 11 to August 19 (extended from August 13), as well as serving as a producer. The production planned to rotate different guest actors from the Philippines in various roles, with Vina Morales scheduled to play Aurora Aquino from September 22 to October 22. It was produced by Hal Luftig, Patrick Catullo, Diana DiMenna, Clint Ramos, Jose Antonio Vargas, Gabriella Wilson, Joseph Glenn Herbert, Sr., and Allan Pineda Lindo.

The Broadway transfer included an extensive renovation of the Broadway Theatre, with the entire orchestra seating section removed to create the dancefloor area and the front mezzanine effectively becoming the front row. The production closed on November 26, 2023 after a run of 33 previews and 149 regular performances.

== Synopsis ==
As clubbers enter Club Millennium, the DJ sets up the party with music and the Imelda Marcos motif. The DJ instructs the clubbers to enjoy the party as they watch the club's staff reenact the life of Imelda Marcos. The club ensemble enters, singing about the excess of wealth demonstrated by Americans, and conversely how some may find that display desirable ("American Troglodyte").

Imelda Romualdez is shown as a poor girl (Note: Imelda Marcos was born into the Romualdez political clan, which at the time of her birth was very wealthy, but due to a change in fortunes shortly afterwards, much of her childhood was spent in poverty. This was a source of embarrassment in her later political career, a topic that is addressed in the musical.) in stormy Leyte with best friend Estrella Cumpas and expresses her dreams of joining the upper class ("Here Lies Love"). Ninoy Aquino appears and describes his life as a son of a rich Filipino family, his pride in his country, and his endearment to Imelda ("Child of the Philippines"). However, their relationship is short-lived: while Ninoy wishes to pursue politics and give voice to the people, Imelda is only interested in "love and beauty," and they break up ("Opposite Attraction"). Imelda, brushing off the breakup as Ninoy deciding she was "too tall", joins and wins a beauty pageant ("Rose of Tacloban"). Estrella suggests she move to Manila to try to climb the social ladder. She arrives around the same time that Ferdinand Marcos is becoming even more famous ("A Perfect Hand"). Ferdinand and Imelda meet each other and engage in a whirlwind courtship that quickly leads to marriage ("Eleven Days"). Estrella, having been left behind in Imelda's rise in status, admires from afar and reminisces ("When She Passed By").

Ferdinand and Imelda honeymoon and become a power couple among the Philippines' upper class ("Sugartime Baby"). As the years pass, Imelda reflects on her more innocent childhood days in poverty but decides she will become the perfect wife to the Senator, all while self-medicating to suppress the stress of life in the public sphere ("Walk Like a Woman"). Maria Luisa, an expression of Imelda's inner self, encourages her to become a figure for the country at large. Imelda and Ferdinand campaign as part of Ferdinand's presidential bid, promising various construction projects to improve the country's image, and end up winning ("Don't You Agree? / Pretty Face").

In Malacañang, Imelda spearheads lavish parties and travels overseas to party with celebrities in New York at Studio 54 and other society haunts ("Dancing Together"). However, unrest begins to stir in the Philippines due to the Marcoses spending the peoples' money on parties and construction projects over infrastructure and public health; in the wake of these events, including the Manila Film Center disaster, (Note: In reality, the Manila Film Center disaster occurred in 1981, while Aquino was in exile in America.) an opposition movement forms under the now-Senator Ninoy Aquino, who puts aside his past with Imelda and the potential risk against his life to become one of the Marcoses' most outspoken critics ("Fabulous One"). Around the same time, Ferdinand engages in an affair with Dovie Beams: Maria Luisa sings to a grief-stricken Imelda that this could only be expected from a man like Ferdinand ("Men Will Do Anything"). As Imelda reflects on her life, she decides her new purpose is in service of the Philippines, choosing to symbolically rid herself of her past ("Star and Slave"). When Ferdinand becomes sick, he begs for forgiveness. Fed up with him, Imelda declares that she will run the country as he is too weak to effectively govern; she becomes the de facto leader of the Philippines, though the regime maintains that Ferdinand is still in charge ("Poor Me").

Unrest only escalates under Imelda's leadership, with Ninoy calling attention to the regime's crackdown on dissenters, but Imelda distracts the clubgoers and international leaders with parties and diplomacy ("Please Don't"). Estrella does a tell-all interview revealing Imelda's poor background, undermining the narrative Imelda tries to push that she was born into a wealthy family. Imelda, increasingly delusional with power, confronts Estrella and offers her money to retract her statements. When Estrella refuses, Imelda has her imprisoned ("Solano Avenue"). Due to the growing numbers of protests in Manila ("Riots and Bombs"), Ferdinand declares martial law, and the ensemble sings of their experiences and suffering, mocking the façade of safety the Marcoses claim to provide ("Order 1081"). Among the dissenters is Ninoy, who criticizes the Marcoses for events like the Plaza Miranda bombing, and he is eventually imprisoned for seven years. Imelda visits Ninoy in his cell and, citing their past relationship and her claimed sympathy to his plight, frees him on the condition he goes to the United States and never comes back, offering a veiled threat that he will be killed if he remains ("Seven Years"). Ninoy flees to the United States with his wife Cory and son Benny but returns in 1983, only to be assassinated on the tarmac, implied to be at Imelda's orders ("Gate 37"). (Note: The Broadway production staged the sequence such that it appears Imelda sanctioned the assassination, as she is seen watching from above and putting on her sunglasses with no reaction. It has never been definitively proven who ordered Aquino's death, whether it was the Marcoses themselves or someone in their administration.)

At his funeral, Ninoy's mother Aurora calls for the people to revolt as the attendees don yellow armbands, raise their hands in the Laban sign, and burn Imelda and Ferdinand in effigy ("Just Ask the Flowers"). As the Marcoses' popularity and support crumbles, Imelda pathetically asks the people why they have turned against her after all she believes she did for them, while specters of Estrella, Ferdinand, and Maria Luisa similarly accuse her of abandoning them after they helped her get where she is ("Why Don't You Love Me?"). In the wake of the People Power Revolution, Imelda and Ferdinand are evacuated from the palace by a U.S. Air Force helicopter, bringing their regime to an end. As they leave, a still-delusional Imelda continues to insist she did everything "for love".

In the silence that follows, the DJ comes down from his booth. He sings the story of the People Power Revolution while playing his guitar, gradually joined by the rest of the ensemble as they collectively marvel at the peaceful end to an otherwise violent regime ("God Draws Straight"). (Note: Prior to Broadway, the song was introduced by the actress playing Imelda Marcos. On Broadway, the DJ tells the audience that the Marcos regime is once again in power in the Philippines with the 2022 election of Bongbong Marcos, Imelda's son. He remarks that democracy is only as strong as its people, before introducing the song himself.)

== Musical numbers ==
- "American Troglodyte"
- "Here Lies Love"
- "Child of the Philippines"
- "Opposite Attraction"
- "The Rose of Tacloban"
- "A Perfect Hand"
- "Eleven Days"
- "When She Passed By"
- "Sugartime Baby"
- "Walk Like a Woman"
- "Don't You Agree? / Pretty Face"
- "Dancing Together"
- "The Fabulous One"
- "Men Will Do Anything"
- "Star and Slave"
- "Poor Me"
- "Please Don't"
- "Solano Avenue"
- "Riots and Bombs"
- "Order 1081"
- "Seven Years"
- "Gate 37"
- "Just Ask the Flowers"
- "Why Don't You Love Me?"
- "God Draws Straight"

The show originally ended with "Here Lies Love (Reprise)", a curtain call sing-along reprise of the title song. Although included on the cast album and all major productions since the Public, it was cut from the Broadway production beginning with the July 6, 2023 preview performance. For the rest of previews and for a period of time after opening night, an instrumental reprise of "Please Don't" accompanied the bows, followed by a drumline. On August 23, 2023, this was replaced by a sing-along medley of "Please Don't", "Eleven Days", and "Here Lies Love".

"Sugartime Baby" reuses the melody of "Never So Big," a song from the concept album. The pre-show mix includes remixes of songs featured on the concept album that do not appear in the final show, including "Every Drop of Rain," "How Are You," and "The Whole Man."

== Characters ==
- Imelda Marcos - A provincial girl who became the wife of Senator Ferdinand Marcos; subsequently became First Lady.
- Ferdinand Marcos - A politician and lawyer. The longest-serving President of the Philippines who put the Philippines under martial law from 1972-1981.
- Ninoy Aquino - A scion of the rich and political Aquino clan, the staunchest leader of the opposition party during the Marcos administration, murdered in what is now known as Ninoy Aquino International Airport.
- Aurora Aquino - Ninoy's mother.
- Estrella Cumpas - Imelda's best friend, yaya (nanny), and maid who also functions "as a representation for the people, who elected President Marcos with such hope and faith, but then over the years, witnessed the betrayal, graft, corruption, and crimes against humanity that ensued." Cumpas served and lived with the Romualdez family for almost ten years beginning as a 10-year-old.
- DJ - Encourages the audience to dance and interacts with them throughout the show, revealed to be one of the revolutionaries towards the end who sings "God Draws Straight."
- Maria Luisa - A featured soloist in the ensemble who performs in "Don't You Agree?/Pretty Face" and "Men Will Do Anything." Originally an unnamed ensemble track originated by Maria-Christina Oliveras, the character gained the name "Maria Luisa" for Broadway after one of Imelda's real "Blue Ladies," socialites who campaigned for the Marcoses and often accompanied her on trips. She functions as a figment of Imelda's imagination and an expression of her inner thoughts.

== Casts ==
Role	Off-Broadway	London	Seattle	Broadway
Role	2013	2014	2017	2023
Imelda Marcos	Ruthie Ann Miles	Natalie Mendoza	Jaygee Macapugay	Arielle Jacobs
Ferdinand Marcos	Jose Llana	Mark Bautista	Mark Bautista	Jose Llana
Ninoy Aquino	Conrad Ricamora	Dean John-Wilson	Conrad Ricamora	Conrad Ricamora
Estrella Cumpas	Melody Butiu	Gia Macuja Atchison	Melody Butiu	Melody Butiu
DJ	Kelvin Moon Loh	Martin Sarreal	Tobias Christian Wong	Moses Villarama
Aurora Aquino	Natalie Cortez	Li-Tong Hsu	Jonelle Margallo	Reanne Acasio/Lea Salonga/Vina Morales (Note: Acasio opened the role at the start of previews and is the Original Broadway cast member for the ensemble track that includes the character: however, Salonga played the role beginning with the July 11 preview for a limited run that included the musical's official opening night.)
Maria Luisa (Note: The character was originally an ensemble track originated by Maria-Christina Oliveras, and was credited as "Soloist" in early versions of the show. She was given the name "Maria Luisa" for the Broadway production.)	Maria-Christina Oliveras	Frances Mayli McCann	Shea Renne	Jasmine Forsberg

== Critical response ==
=== Pre-Broadway ===
Generally described as innovative, Here Lies Love has been characterized as challenging tradition by becoming an immersive show that utilizes much audience engagement and inventive set design that transforms the theatre into a disco ballroom adorned by horizontal screens and neon accents. Alice Kaderlan wrote, "rarely has a show that gets this much advance PR met my expectations, but I was totally captivated from the production’s opening moments. The story is a little slim and there are no great insights about Imelda, but the infectious, pulsating music (by Byrne and Fatboy Slim) and dazzling production design make for a snappy, nonstop 90 minutes."

Jeffrey Hannan said, "Narrative structure and character development are inviolable necessities in good theatre and Here Lies Love doesn't cheat in that regard. Despite any preconceived notions of Imelda Marcos you may harbor upon arrival, as the 90-minute event unfolds, you are demanded to see this as a story not of the somewhat laughable icon presented by American media but of a woman. And her husband. And his rival. And other core characters who give humanity to the terrible as well as tabloid headlines."

Vulture's Jesse Green stated that while it is an accumulation of static disco songs, "something wonderful is also going on."

Not all reviews were positive. Actress Sara Porkalob characterized the production as having "failed to realize that Imelda was a formidable political figure in her own right. She was a crucial and knowing player in her husband's domestic and foreign policies and was not fashionable innocent, formed only by the men in her life, as the play makes her out to be".

=== Broadway ===
Accusations that the show glamorizes the Marcos regime were raised following the announcement of the musical's Broadway transfer in 2023, particularly in light of the Marcos family's return to power in the Philippines with Bongbong Marcos's election in 2022. The producers issued a statement in response emphasizing that they viewed the show as anti-Marcos and pro-Philippines, noting, "History repeats itself. Democracies all over the world are under threat. The biggest threat to any democracy is disinformation, Here Lies Love offers a creative way of re-information—an innovative template on how to stand up to tyrant. We cannot tell the modern history of the Philippines without the United States. They’re intertwined".

The Broadway production received mostly positive reviews. David Gordon of TheaterMania praised the Broadway staging, noting the expansion of the set from the version at the Public Theater and the amount of detail present in the musical that was largely unseen on Broadway. Jackson McHenry writing for Vulture praised the show as an "unsettlingly good time", noting its effective use of moral dissonance as the audience is encouraged to dance along to an increasingly uncomfortable story.

While New York reviewers largely agreed that–contrary to criticism–the musical was anti-Marcos, some questioned the effectiveness of the message. Jesse Green, who had praised the Public Theater's production, found that the moral was complicated by the musical intentionally making audiences clap and cheer for the Marcoses prior to the story's shift.

==== Controversy ====
Here Lies Love attracted criticism from musicians' unions for intending to use a pre-recorded soundtrack and no live musicians. Local 802 of the American Federation of Musicians has criticized this choice as "A direct attack on Broadway Audiences [sic]—and live music." The creative team attempted to defend this decision saying it was inspired by karaoke, and saying the show "does not believe in artistic gate-keepers [sic]". But this statement drew further ire from the union, who said in a statement, "rather than negotiate, David Byrne is trying to break the union. Broadway musicians are not ‘gatekeepers’ like David Byrne callously said [...] Instead of using his show to lift up musicians that are struggling, he’s denigrating their work, tossing them aside and saying they can’t do it" and threatened "further measures" if they still continued to not use live musicians. On June 9, 2023, it was announced that the musical would employ twelve live musicians, which includes three actor-musicians.

== Awards and nominations ==
=== Original Off-Broadway production ===
Year	Award ceremony	Category	Nominee	Result
2013	Drama League Award	Outstanding Production of a Broadway or Off-Broadway Musical		Nominated
2013	Drama Desk Award	Outstanding Projection Design	Peter Nigrini	Won
2013	Drama Desk Award	Outstanding Music	David Byrne & Fatboy Slim	Won
2013	Henry Hewes Design Award	Notable Effect in Projection Design	Peter Nigrini	Won
2013	Obie Award	Outstanding Music and Lyrics	David Byrne & Fatboy Slim	Won
2013	Outer Critics Circle Award	Outstanding New Off-Broadway Musical		Won
2014	Lucille Lortel Award	Outstanding Musical		Nominated
2014	Lucille Lortel Award	Outstanding Director	Alex Timbers	Won
2014	Lucille Lortel Award	Outstanding Lead Actress in a Musical	Ruthie Ann Miles	Won
2014	Lucille Lortel Award	Outstanding Lead Actor in a Musical	Jose Llana	Nominated
2014	Lucille Lortel Award	Outstanding Featured Actress in a Musical	Melody Butiu	Nominated
2014	Lucille Lortel Award	Outstanding Choreography	Annie-B Parson	Nominated
2014	Lucille Lortel Award	Outstanding Costume Design	Clint Ramos	Won
2014	Lucille Lortel Award	Outstanding Scenic Design	David Korins	Nominated
2014	Lucille Lortel Award	Outstanding Lighting Design	Justin Townsend	Won
2014	Lucille Lortel Award	Outstanding Sound Design	M.L. Dogg & Cody Spencer	Won

=== Original London production ===
Year	Award ceremony	Category	Nominee	Result
2015	Laurence Olivier Award	Best New Musical		Nominated
2015	Laurence Olivier Award	Outstanding Achievement in Music	David Byrne & Fatboy Slim	Nominated
2015	Laurence Olivier Award	Best Theatre Choreography	Annie-B Parson	Nominated

=== Original Broadway production ===
Year	Award ceremony	Category	Nominee	Result
2024	Tony Award	Best Original Score (Music and/or Lyrics) Written for the Theatre	David Byrne and Fatboy Slim	Nominated
2024	Tony Award	Best Scenic Design of a Musical	David Korins	Nominated
2024	Tony Award	Best Sound Design of a Musical	M. L. Dogg and Cody Spencer	Nominated
2024	Tony Award	Best Choreography	Annie-B Parson	Nominated
2024	Drama League Award	Outstanding Revival of a Musical		Nominated
2024	Drama League Award	Outstanding Direction of a Musical	Alex Timbers	Nominated
2024	Drama League Award	Distinguished Performance	Conrad Ricamora	Nominated
2024	Outer Critics Circle Award	Outstanding Revival of a Musical		Nominated
2024	Outer Critics Circle Award	Outstanding Scenic Design	David Korins	Nominated
2024	Outer Critics Circle Award	Outstanding Lighting Design	Justin Townsend	Nominated
2024	Outer Critics Circle Award	Outstanding Sound Design	M.L. Dogg and Cody Spencer	Nominated
