= Jose Llana =

Filipino-American singer and actor (born 1976)

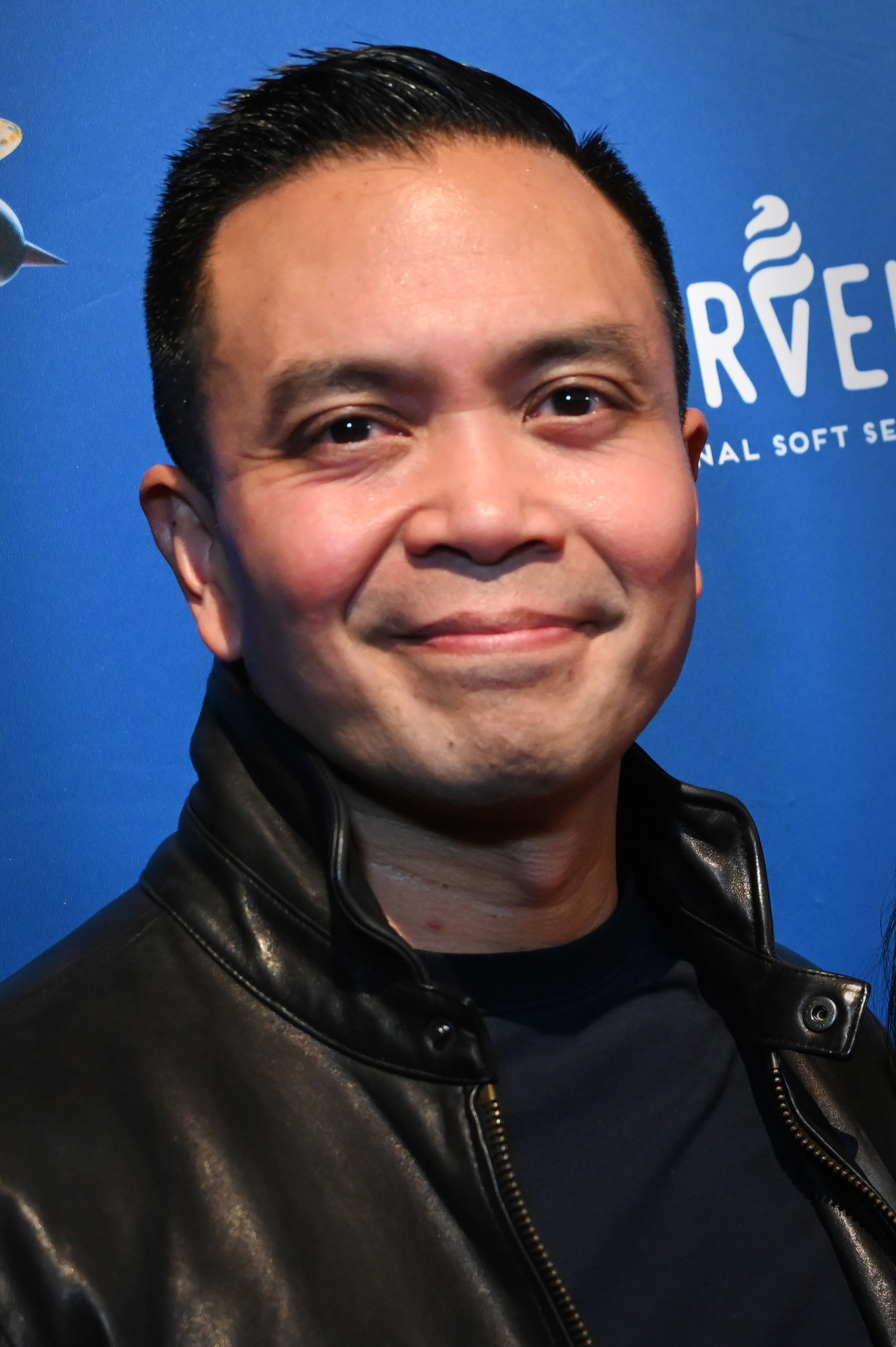
- Llana in 2025
- Born: 5 May 1976 (age 50); Manila, Philippines
- Occupations: Singer, actor
- Partner: Erik Rose
- Website: http://www.josellana.com

Jose Llana (born 5 May 1976) is a Filipino-American singer and actor best known for originating roles in the Broadway musicals The King and I (1996), Flower Drum Song (2002), Here Lies Love (2023), and The 25th Annual Putnam County Spelling Bee (2005), the last for which he won the 2005 Drama Desk Award for Outstanding Ensemble Performance.

== Biography ==
Born 5 May 1976, Llana, a native of Manila, Philippines, grew up in Springfield, Virginia, a suburb of Washington, D.C. After graduating from Thomas Jefferson High School for Science and Technology in Alexandria, Virginia, Jose attended the Manhattan School of Music to study classical voice.

During his freshman year he was discovered in an audition for the 1996 Revival of Rodgers and Hammerstein's The King and I and made his Broadway debut as Lun Tha starring opposite Lou Diamond Phillips and Donna Murphy.

He went on to star on Broadway as Angel in Rent, Jessie-Lee in Streetcorner Symphony, Wang Ta in Flower Drum Song opposite Lea Salonga, and as Chip Tolentino in The 25th Annual Putnam County Spelling Bee for which he and his cast won a 2005 Drama Desk Award for Best Ensemble Performance. His Off-Broadway credits include Gabey in On the Town and Saturn Returns, both at The Public Theater and Adam in Falling for Eve at The York Theater. His regional theater credits include the title role in Candide (Barrymore Award Nomination for Best Actor) and Tin Man Wong in The Ballad of Little Jo at the Steppenwolf Theater (Joseph Jefferson Award Nomination - Best Supporting Actor). He toured the country in Cameron Mackintosh's Martin Guerre as Guillaume which went to The Kennedy Center after originating at The Guthrie Theater.

Llana has appeared on television in HBO's Sex and the City, alongside Margaret Cho and made his commercial debut as a computer salesman for Circuit City in 1999. He appeared in the Sony Pictures 2005 feature film Hitch opposite Will Smith and Eva Mendes, as well as the independent film Unconscious.

Llana is also a best-selling recording artist in his native Philippines having recorded his debut solo album, Jose, in 2004 under the VIVA Philippines label.

Llana starred as El Gato in Wonderland: Alice's New Musical Adventure, which began performances on Broadway March 21, 2011 and officially opened on April 17, 2011. The production closed on May 15, 2011, after 31 previews and 33 performances.

Llana has portrayed Ferdinand Marcos (2014 Lucille Lortel Award Nomination, Outstanding Lead Actor in a Musical) in David Byrne and Fat Boy Slim's Here Lies Love, directed by Alex Timbers, since the workshop production at Mass MoCA in North Adams, MA during the summer of 2012. Here Lies Love had its world premier production at The Public Theater in New York City on April 2, 2013, and was extended four times through July 28, 2013. The Off-Broadway commercial production of Here Lies Love opened at The Public Theater in New York City on May 1, 2014, and has performances through January 2015.

Llana co-starred as Bill Sikes in The Paper Mill Playhouse production of Oliver! in December 2013.

On March 12, 2015, Llana made his Lincoln Center American Songbook Concert Debut at the Stanley H. Kaplan Penthouse in New York.

On June 18, 2015, it was announced that Llana will succeed Ken Watanabe in the role of the King of Siam in Lincoln Center's Tony-winning revival of The King and I. Llana played an 11-week engagement in the role from July 14 to September 29.

== Personal life ==
Llana was born in Manila, Philippines and immigrated with his family to Springfield, Virginia when he was 3 years old. He is gay and is married to his partner of 15 years, Erik Rose.

== Theatre credits ==
Selected credits

Title	Year(s)	Role(s)	Theatre	Notes	Ref(s)
The King and I	1996	Lun Tha	Neil Simon Theatre	Original Broadway cast	
Rent	1996-1997	Angel Schunard	Nederlander Theatre	Broadway	
Street Corner Symphony	1997-1998	Jessie-Lee	Brooks Atkinson Theatre	Original Broadway cast	
Flower Drum Song	2002-2003	Wang Ta	Virginia Theatre	Original Broadway cast	
The 25th Annual Putnam County Spelling Bee	2005-2008	Chip Tolentino	Circle in the Square Theatre	Original Broadway cast, won 2005 Drama Desk Award for Outstanding Ensemble Performance	
Wonderland	2011	El Gato	Marquis Theatre	Original Broadway cast	
Here Lies Love	2013	Marcos	The Public Theater	Off-Broadway	
Ragtime	2013	Harry Houdini	Avery Fisher Hall	Concert performance	
The King and I	2015	King of Siam	Vivian Beaumont Theater	Broadway	
Twelfth Night	2016	Orsino	The Public Theater	Off-Broadway	
Here Lies Love	2023	Marcos	Broadway Theatre	Original Broadway cast	
Titanic	2024	Thomas Andrews	New York City Center	Off-Broadway Encores!	

== See also ==
- Filipinos in the New York City metropolitan region
