= City in Fear =

1980 American television film

- Genre: Drama
- Screenplay by: Peter Masterson
- Story by: Albert Ruben
- Directed by: Jud Taylor (Note: Credited as Alan Smithee.)
- Starring: David Janssen; Robert Vaughn; Perry King; Mickey Rourke; William Daniels; Susan Sullivan; William Prince; Allan Miller
- Theme music composer: Leonard Rosenman
- Country of origin: United States
- Original language: English

Production
- Executive producer: Peter Masterson
- Producer: Ronald Lyon
- Cinematography: John Bailey
- Editor: Fred A. Chulack
- Running time: 124 minutes
- Production company: Trans World International

Original release
- Network: ABC
- Release: March 30, 1980

City in Fear is a 1980 American made-for-television drama film directed by Jud Taylor, under the pseudonym Alan Smithee, and written by Peter Masterson based on a story by Albert Ruben. The film, starring David Janssen (in one of his final roles), Robert Vaughn, Mickey Rourke, Susan Sullivan and Perry King, follows a newspaper's attempts to sensationalize the killing spree of a psychopath.

Filmed in mid-1979, City in Fear premiered in the US on ABC on March 30, 1980, one month after Janssen's death. The film won an Edgar Allan Poe Award.

== Plot ==
Vince Perrino is a frustrated, cynical, alcoholic, chain smoking newspaper columnist who is hired by a wealthy publisher, named Harrison Crawford III, who hopes that Perrino can revamp a small Los Angeles newspaper agency that Crawford just bought out when a series of murders of young women begins all over the city. Crawford wants Perrino's expertise to make the killings front-page news. Meanwhile, the killer is revealed to the viewers to be a dangerously disturbed grocery store employee, named Tony Pate, who is one of several suspects that LAPD detectives John Armstrong and Raymond Zavala, are investigating. Part of the plot is loosely based on the Son of Sam murders and shows a deep insight into how newspapers and television news will go to extreme lengths to sell papers in order to exploit a time of a local crisis.

== Cast ==
- David Janssen as Vince Perrino
- Robert Vaughn as Harrison Crawford III
- Perry King as Lieutenant John Armstrong
- Mickey Rourke as Tony Pate
- William Prince as Harrison Crawford II
- Susan Sullivan as Madeleine Crawford
- William Daniels as Freeman Stribling
- Pepe Serna as Raymond Zavala
- Allan Miller as George Weller
- M. Emmet Walsh as Sheldon Lewis
- Christopher Allport as Kenny Reiger
- Lane Smith as Brian
- Frank McRae as Captain Madison
- Mary Stuart Masterson as Abby Crawford

== Production ==
The film was inspired by a conversation between two friends, William Goldman and Pete Masterson. Goldman got the idea when he came home one afternoon to find that his daughter, then about twelve, had tried to dye her hair because the real life serial killer, Son Of Sam, was said to be killing dark-haired women. Goldman was horrified that exploitive press accounts had reached into his home and frightened his daughter and saw a story in the interplay of killer and press. "That's how pervasive women's fear became," said director Jud Taylor. Goldman told Masterson "this would make a terrific TV movie" and they hired Albert Rubin to write a script and novelist and friend Linda Stewart to write a novel based on the idea. The novel was published by Delacorte under the title "Panic on Page One" to solid reviews in the New York Times (October 28, 1979) and the L.A. Times (September 16, 1979) among others. For the ABC-TV movie, Taylor cast Mickey Rourke as the killer. "It was one of Mickey's first big parts, and he was extraordinary, and conveyed just the sense of casual menace -- he was a bag boy in a Los Angeles supermarket, for God's sake -- that we wanted."

Director Jud Taylor later made Out of the Darkness based on the policeman who investigated the Son of Sam case.

Taylor had his name removed from the film. "After I left, the producers filmed four more point-blank murders without asking me, and I was offended," he said. Stewart, called in to do a rewrite of the script " to make it closer to the novel" also removed her name when her changes were changed.
