= Search for the Gods =

- Genre: Drama
- Directed by: Jud Taylor
- Starring: Kurt Russell
- Music by: Billy Goldenberg
- Country of origin: United States
- Original language: English

Production
- Executive producer: Douglas S. Cramer
- Producer: Wilford Lloyd Baumes
- Production location: Taos, New Mexico
- Cinematography: Matthew F. Leonetti
- Editor: Art Seid
- Running time: 97 minutes
- Production companies: Douglas S. Cramer Company; Warner Bros. Television

Original release
- Network: ABC
- Release: March 9, 1975

Search for the Gods is a 1975 made-for-television drama film directed by Jud Taylor. It stars Kurt Russell and Stephen McHattie. It was intended to be the pilot episode of a TV series that never made it into production.

== Plot ==
Three young adventurers—Willie Longfellow, Genera Juantez, and Shan Mullins—are searching for parts of a mysterious golden tablet, which brings to light evidence that astronauts from another world visited Earth in ancient times and had a profound effect on the technological advancement of the human race.

== Cast ==
- Kurt Russell as Shan Mullins
- Stephen McHattie as Willie Longfellow
- Ralph Bellamy as Dr. Henderson
- Victoria Racimo as Genera Juantez
- Raymond St. Jacques as Raymond Stryker
- Albert Paulsen as Tarkanian
- John War Eagle as Lucio
- Carmen Argenziano as Wheeler
