= Gee Malik Linton =

American film producer (born 1973)

- Born: Gerard Malik Linton; December 9, 1973 (age 52); Brooklyn, New York, United States
- Other name: Declan Dale
- Education: Adelphi University
- Occupations: Director, screenwriter, producer
- Years active: 2001–present
- Height: 6 ft 1.5 in (186.7 cm)
- Spouse: Melissa Linton (1999-present)
- Children: 2

Gee Malik Linton (born December 9, 1973) is an American film director, screenwriter and producer.

== Career ==
Born in Brooklyn, New York, to a Jamaican family, Gee Malik Linton majored in physics in college and was pursuing a master's degree until he sold a screenplay and switched to filmmaking. Beginning his career writing and directing short films, he then worked as a physical trainer for Tobey Maguire during Spider-Man, Leonardo DiCaprio during The Departed, and Anne Hathaway during The Dark Knight Rises.

Linton directed the 2016 thriller Exposed starring Keanu Reeves, which was mired in controversy. Throughout the writing and filming process, Linton had a different view for the movie than Lionsgate, the studio releasing the movie. Alterations the studio made included changing the name from the original Daughter of God to Exposed, as well as changing the focus of the movie onto the character played by Keanu Reeves during the editing process. These unwanted changes led to Linton asking for his name to be removed from the film, instead being listed as Declan Dale, a pseudonym in the vein of Alan Smithee.

== Personal life ==
Linton holds a graduate diploma in physics and is married to actress Melissa Linton née Mercedes Cardello.

== Filmography ==
- 2001: No Mirror Land (short)
- 2016: Exposed (credited as Declan Dale)
