= Ruthie Ann Miles =

American actress and singer (born 1983)

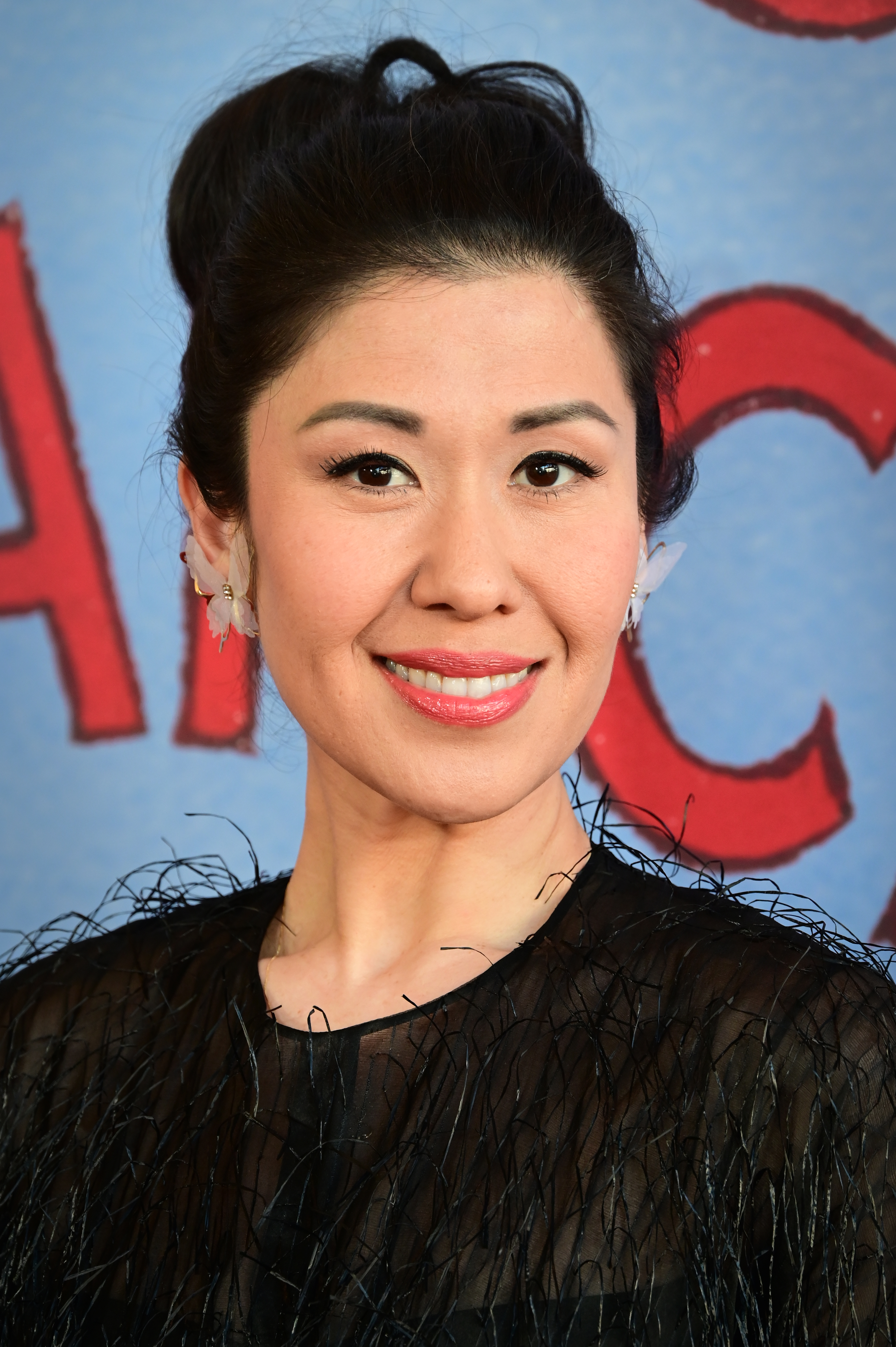
Miles in 2026

Ruthie Ann Miles (born April 21, 1983) is an American actress and singer, best known for her roles in musical theatre, especially in The King and I and Here Lies Love, and on television.

Early in her career, Miles played Christmas Eve in Avenue Q and starred as Imelda Marcos in Here Lies Love off-Broadway, winning a Theatre World Award and a Lucille Lortel Award for the latter role. She performed the role of Lady Thiang in the 2015–2016 Lincoln Center production of The King and I on Broadway, for which she won the 2015 Tony Award for Best Featured Actress in a Musical. In 2016, she had a recurring television role on The Americans. She returned to Broadway as Frieda/Betty in the 2017 revival of Sunday in the Park with George. In 2018, after recovering from injuries from a car crash that killed her daughter and caused her to lose her unborn child, Miles returned to the stage, reprising her role in the West End production of The King and I.

From 2019 to 2023, Miles played Sherri Kansky in the television series All Rise. In 2023, she received another nomination for the Tony Award for Best Featured Actress in a Musical for her portrayal of the Beggar Woman in the Broadway revival of Sweeney Todd.

== Early life and education ==
Miles was born in Arizona and raised by her Korean mother, Esther Wong, a music teacher, first in Korea and, from 2nd grade, in Honolulu, Hawaii. "I had to work very quickly and very hard to break my accent," Miles has said. She attended Kaimuki High School, graduating in 2001, and then Southern Oregon University before earning her bachelor's degree at Palm Beach Atlantic University in 2005. She received a Master of Music in Vocal Performance with an emphasis on music theatre at New York University's Steinhardt School of Culture, Education, and Human Development.

== Career ==
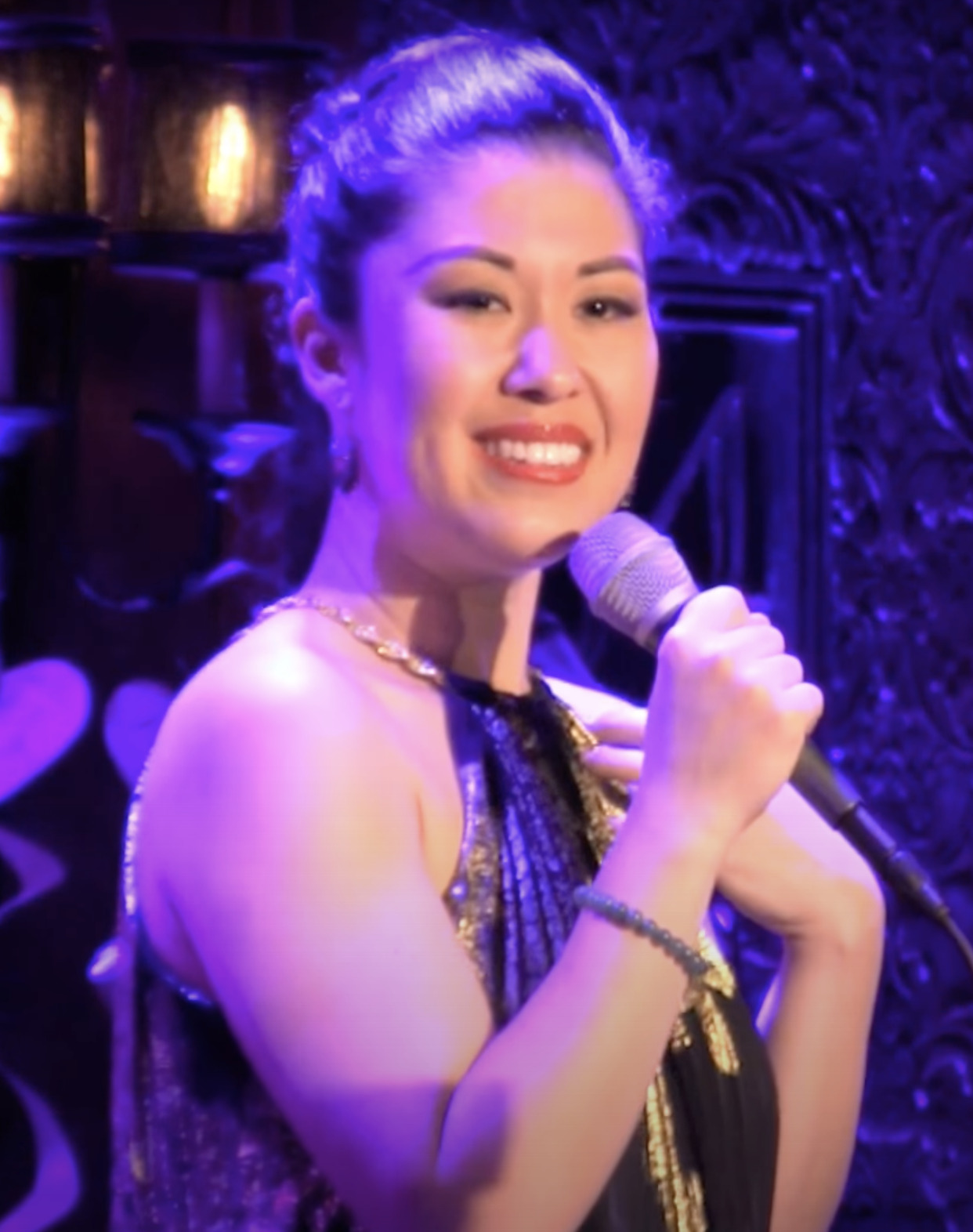
Miles at Feinstein's/54 Below in 2015

With the off-Broadway York Theatre, Miles appeared as Leah in Two by Two and Red Urchin in The Roar of the Greasepaint – The Smell of the Crowd. She played Christmas Eve and other characters in Avenue Q off-Broadway for two years beginning in 2011. For her starring role as Imelda Marcos in Here Lies Love, in 2013 off-Broadway at The Public Theater, she won a Theatre World Award and a Lucille Lortel Award. Miles has appeared in national tours of Sweeney Todd (as Adolfo Pirelli) and Annie. She has played numerous roles in regional theatre and appeared as a doctor in the film I Am Michael.

Miles received positive reviews for her role as Lady Thiang in the 2015 Broadway revival of The King and I, with Ben Brantley of The New York Times writing that she "turns 'Something Wonderful' into an exquisite expression of romantic realism that could be the show's anthem." Another critic called her "the one featured performer in a play or musical, on or off-Broadway, who I thought was giving the best performance this season ... [her] Lady Thiang is more empathetic than in other productions I have seen. ... People who see this King and I will think about Lady Thiang. They will think about what she knows, what she feels." For this role, she won the Tony Award for Best Featured Actress in a Musical and the Outer Critics Circle Award for Outstanding Featured Actress in a Musical.

In 2016, Miles appeared in a recurring role in the television series The Americans, playing Young-Hee Seong, a Korean immigrant and Mary Kay consultant whose husband is of interest to the KGB. She returned to Broadway in 2017 as Frieda/Betty in the revival of Sunday in the Park with George. In February 2018, Miles played Svetlana in a Kennedy Center concert production of the musical Chess. In August 2018, Miles joined the West End production of The King and I, reprising her Broadway role.

From 2019 to 2023, Miles played the featured role of Sherri Kansky in the television series All Rise. She returned to Broadway in February 2023 as the Beggar Woman in Sweeney Todd, for which she was nominated for another Tony Award. During a brief break from Sweeney Todd in June, Miles played Margaret Johnson in The Light in the Piazza in a New York City Encores! production that "reexamined the musical ... from an Asian American perspective. A week later, she sang the national anthem at A Capitol Fourth.

In 2024, she originated the role of Sahra in the play McNeal on Broadway, and in 2025, she created the role of Dorothy in the musical Millions at the Alliance Theatre in Atlanta, Georgia. In 2026, she is back on Broadway in The Fantasticks, playing Bessie Mae Bellomy, one of the mothers.

== Personal life ==
She is married to Jonathan Blumenstein. On March 5, 2018, Miles was injured, and the couple's five-year-old daughter Abigail Blumenstein was killed, while crossing a street in Brooklyn, New York, after they and other pedestrians were struck by a car that was driven through a red light. Miles was 7 months pregnant with her second child at the time of the incident. On May 11, 2018, Miles and Blumenstein lost their unborn daughter. Miles returned to the stage in August 2018. She gave birth to a daughter in April 2020 named Hope Elizabeth.

== Work ==
=== Theatre ===
Year	Title	Role	Theatre	Ref.
2004	Two by Two	Leah	Cumberland County Playhouse	
2008–09	Sweeney Todd: The Demon Barber of Fleet Street	Adolfo Pirelli	U.S. National Tour	
2009	Avenue Q	Ensemble	New World Stages	
2010	The Roar of the Greasepaint – The Smell of the Crowd	Red Bully	York Theatre	
2013–15	Here Lies Love	Imelda Marcos	The Public Theater	
2015–16	The King and I	Lady Thiang	Vivian Beaumont Theater	
2016	Sunday in the Park with George	Frieda/Betty	New York City Center	
2017	Sunday in the Park with George	Frieda/Betty	Hudson Theatre	
2018	Chess	Svetlana	Eisenhower Theater	
2018	The King and I	Lady Thiang	London Palladium	
2019	Camelot	Nimue	Vivian Beaumont Theatre (one-night benefit concert)	
2019	The King and I	Lady Thiang	Tokyu Orb Theatre	
2023–24	Sweeney Todd: The Demon Barber of Fleet Street	The Beggar Woman	Lunt-Fontanne Theatre	
2023	The Light in the Piazza	Margaret Johnson	New York City Center Encores!	
2024	A Little Night Music	Countess Charlotte	Lincoln Center (concert performance)	
2024	McNeal	Sahra Grewal	Vivian Beaumont Theater	
2025	Millions	Dorothy	Alliance Theatre	
2026	Hello, Dolly!	Irene Molloy	Ogunquit Playhouse	
2026	The Fantasticks	Bessie Mae Bellomy	Helen Hayes Theater, Broadway	

=== Film ===
Year	Title	Role	Notes	Ref.
2020	Over The Moon	Mother	Voice; Animated film	

=== Television ===
Year	Title	Role	Notes	Ref.
2016	The Americans	Young Hee Seong	6 episodes	
2017	Elementary	Rockaway Detective	Episode: "Be My Guest"	
2019–23	All Rise	Sherri Kansky	Main cast; 58 episodes	
2022	Evil	Dr. Beverly Swan	Episode: "The Demon of Death"	

== Awards and nominations ==
Year	Award	Category	Nominated work	Result	Ref.
2014	Lucille Lortel Award	Outstanding Lead Actress in a Musical	Here Lies Love	Won	
2014	Theatre World Award		Here Lies Love	Honoree	
2015	Tony Award	Best Featured Actress in a Musical	The King and I	Won	
2015	Outer Critics Circle Award	Outstanding Featured Actress in a Musical	The King and I	Won	
2019	Laurence Olivier Award	Best Actress in a Supporting Role in a Musical	The King and I	Nominated	
2023	Tony Award	Best Featured Actress in a Musical	Sweeney Todd: The Demon Barber of Fleet Street	Nominated	
2026	Drama Desk Award	Outstanding Featured Performance in a Musical	The Seat of Our Pants	Pending	
2026	Lucille Lortel Award	Outstanding Lead Performer in a Musical	The Seat of Our Pants	Nominated	
