= The Debt (1993 film) =

American short film

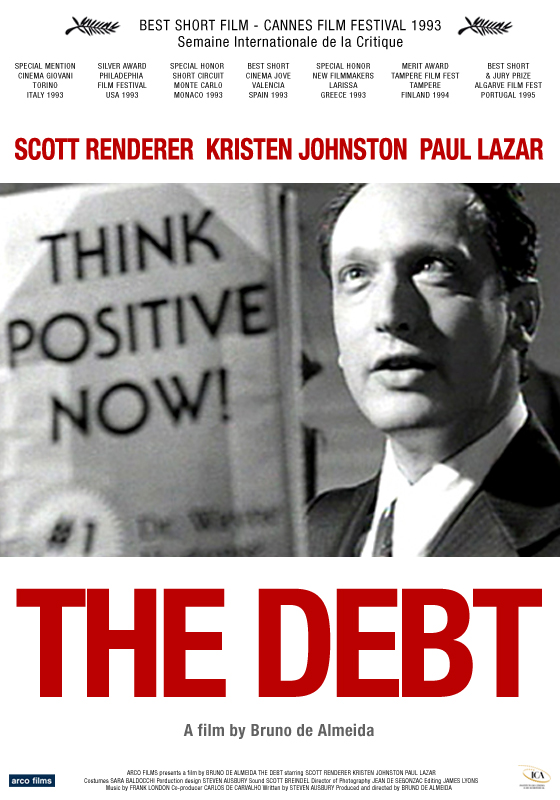
- Directed by: Bruno de Almeida
- Screenplay by: Steven Ausbury
- Produced by: Bruno de Almeida
- Starring: Kristen Johnston; Paul Lazar; Scott Renderer
- Cinematography: Jean de Segonzac
- Music by: Frank London
- Release date: 1993
- Running time: 12 minutes
- Country: United States
- Language: English

The Debt (Portuguese: A Dívida) is a 1993 short film by Bruno de Almeida.

== Plot ==
A Portuguese–American dark comedy, The Debt is a short film set against the backdrop of the early 1990s recession in the United States, and concerns a "yuppie couple" in crisis who are approached by a door-to-door salesman and his book about optimism.

== Production ==
Produced and directed by Bruno de Almeida, written by Steven Ausbury, and scored by Frank London, with Jean de Segonzac as cinematographer, The Debt stars Kristen Johnston, Paul Lazar, and Scott Renderer. It is in English and twelve minutes long.
