= Big Dance Theater =

Big Dance Theater is a New York City-based dance theater company. It is led by Artistic Director Annie-B Parson, who founded Big Dance Theater in 1991 with Molly Hickok and Paul Lazar. Big Dance Theater has created over 20 dance/theater works and won 18 awards over the years. They have been commissioned by the Brooklyn Academy of Music, The National Theater of Paris, The Japan Society, and The Walker Art Center, and have performed in venues such as the Brooklyn Academy of Music, Dance Theater Workshop, The Kitchen, Classic Stage Company, Japan Society, Jacob's Pillow Dance Festival, the Chocolate Factory, the Museum of Contemporary Art in Chicago, Walker Art Center, Yerba Buena, On the Boards, New York Live Arts, UCLA Live, The Spoleto Festival USA, and at festivals in Europe and Brazil.

== Annie-B Parson ==
Annie-B Parson is the founder of Big Dance Theater, specializing in choreography, dancing, and directing, and has choreographed and co-created over 20 works for the Big Dance Theater Company. Parson has also created performance pieces outside the Big Dance Theater Company, doing choreography for opera, pop musicians, television, movies, theatre, ballet, marching bands, and symphonies. Since 1993 Parson has been an instructor of choreography at New York University's Experimental Theater Wing and has also taught at the Ballet Rambert, Yale, and Princeton. Parson has also written articles for the Ballet Review, Movement Research Journal, and Dance USA.

Parson has won a number of awards throughout her career, including:

· Doris Duke Performing Artist Award (2014)

· Olivier Award nomination in choreography (2015)

· Foundation for Contemporary Arts Grants to Artists Award (2014)

· USA Artists Grant in theater (2012)

· Guggenheim Fellowship in Choreography (2007)

· Two BESSIE awards (2010, 2002)

· Three NYFA Choreography Fellowships (2013, 2006, and 2000)

== Paul Lazar ==
Paul Lazar is a founding member of Big Dance Theater, along with Annie Parson, and is co-Artistic Director. He has co-directed and acted in works for Big Dance since 1991. In addition, he has been commissioned by the Brooklyn Academy of Music, the Walker Art Center, Dance Theater Workshop, Classic Stage Company, and Japan Society.

Outside of the Big Dance Theater Company, Lazar's other projects as a director include, We’re Gonna Die and Body Cast. Lazar has also done performances for The Wooster Group, including Brace up!, Emperor Jones, North Atlantic, and The Hairy Ape.

Lazar has also been credited with other acting performances, including Tamburlaine at Theatre for a New Audience, Young Jean Lee's Lear, The Three Sisters at Classic Stage Company, Richard Maxwell's Cowboys and Indians at Soho Rep, Richard III at Classic Stage Company, Svejk at Theatre for a New Audience, Irene Fornes' Mud at Signature Theatre Company and Mabou Mines, and Mac Wellman's 1965 UU.

In the fall of 2020, Lazar created a duet version of Cage Shuffle with Bebe Miller for the Wexner Center for the Arts, which toured the Cena Festival in Brazil in December 2020.

Lazar teaches at New York University and has previously taught at Yale, Rutgers, The William Esper Studio, and the Michael Howard Studio.

== Molly Hickok ==
Molly Hickok is one of the founding members of Big Dance Theater along with Annie-B Parson and Paul Lazar. Hickok's works include:

· The Other Here

· Comme Toujours Here I Stand

· Supernatural Wife

· Ich Kurbisgeist

Hickok has won two awards for her work in Big Dance and as part of the Comme Toujours creative team.

== Elizabeth Dement ==
Elizabeth Dement (Director of Repertory and Creative Workshops) is a New York performer originally from Ukiah, CA. Dement graduated from the Juilliard School and is a dancer and actor.

Throughout Dement's career, she has worked with Peridance Ensemble, the Metropolitan Opera Ballet, Liz Gerring Dance Company, Stephen Petronio, Jodi Melnick, Patrick Corbin, Dance Heginbotham, Christina Masciotti, and Half-Straddle.

In addition, she has worked closely with Annie-B Parson as an associate choreographer on multiple projects for the Big Dance Theater.

== Process and style ==
Big Dance Theater has delved into the literary work of such authors as Mark Twain, Tanizaki, Euripides and Gustave Flaubert, and dance is used as both frame and metaphor to theatricalize these writings.

== Awards ==
- 2018 New York Dance and Performance (Bessie) Award for Outstanding Performance: Elizabeth DeMent in 17c
- 2015 Olivier Award nominee (London) for Best Theatre Choreographer: Annie-B Parson (Here Lies Love)
- 2014 Prelude Festival's FRANKY Award: Annie-B Parson and Paul Lazar
- 2014 Doris Duke Performing Artist Award: Annie-B Parson
- 2014 Foundation for Contemporary Arts Grants to Artists Award: Annie-B Parson
- 2013 New York Foundation for the Arts Artist Fellowship: Annie-B Parson
- 2012 United States Artists Fellowship: Annie-B Parson
- 2010 New York Dance and Performance (Bessie) Award for Outstanding Production: Comme Toujours Here I Stand
- 2007 Inaugural Jacob's Pillow Dance Award: Annie-B Parson and Paul Lazar
- 2007 Guggenheim Fellowship: Annie-B Parson
- 2006 New York Foundation for the Arts Artist Fellowship: Annie-B Parson
- 2005 New York Dance and Performance (Bessie) Award for Performance (body of work): Molly Hickok
- 2002 New York Dance and Performance (Bessie) Award for Sustained Achievement: Big Dance Theater
- 2001 New York Dance and Performance (Bessie) Award for Composer, Another Telepathic Thing: Cynthia Hopkins
- 2000 OBIE Award: Big Dance Theater
- 2000 OBIE Award for Performance, Another Telepathic Thing: Cynthia Hopkins
- 2000 New York Dance and Performance (Bessie) Award for Performance, Another Telepathic Thing: Stacy Dawson
- 2000 New York Foundation for the Arts Artist Fellowship: Annie-B Parson
