= Death of a Gunfighter =

1969 film

- Theatrical release poster
- Directed by: Robert Totten; Don Siegel (Note: Credited as Allen Smithee.)
- Screenplay by: Joseph Calvelli
- Based on: Death of a Gunfighter; 1968 novel by Lewis B. Patten
- Produced by: Richard E. Lyons
- Starring: Richard Widmark; Lena Horne
- Cinematography: Andrew Jackson
- Edited by: Robert F. Shugrue
- Music by: Oliver Nelson
- Color process: Technicolor
- Production company: Universal Pictures
- Distributed by: Universal Pictures
- Release date: May 8, 1969
- Running time: 94 minutes
- Country: United States
- Language: English

Death of a Gunfighter is a 1969 American Western film directed by Robert Totten and Don Siegel. It stars Richard Widmark and Lena Horne and features an original score by Oliver Nelson. The theme of the film is the "passing" of the West, the clash between a traditional character and the politics and demands of modern society. The film direction is credited to Allen Smithee, a pseudonym that has subsequently been used by directors who do not wish to be credited for their film.

== Plot ==
In the town of Cottonwood Springs, Texas at the turn of the century, Marshal Frank Patch is an Old West style lawman in a community determined to move beyond its rough past into the 20th century. When Patch kills drunken Luke Mills in self-defense, the town council decides it is time for the marshal to retire so that a modern police force can be established in the town. Patch refuses, reminding the citizens that when he took the job, the agreement was he could have it as long as he wanted- and he still wanted the job. Afraid of Patch because of his violent nature and his knowledge of their misdeeds in the town's wilder days, the city fathers then enlist the aid of the county sheriff (a Patch protege and friend) to oust him. Patch rebuffs this attempt and the sheriff backs off, bowing out of the dispute. This leads some of the more outspoken councilmen to consider having Patch murdered.

Patch had humiliated one of the town's councilmen, Andrew Oxley, (a cowardly lawyer) at the ad hoc "firing-notice meeting" by slapping him in disgust. Knowing that the incident had deeply embarrassed his grown son, the man resolved to ambush and kill Patch, but when Patch trapped him in a room, he turned the gun on himself rather than face the marshal. The man's son vowed revenge, egged on by some of the councilmen, who saw this as a convenient way of ridding themselves of the problematic town marshal. They plot to ambush Patch. Aware that he will probably be killed, Patch marries his long-time girlfriend Claire, the local brothel madame. The marriage is on the same day as Luke Mill's funeral, after which Patch's murder is planned by the councilmen. The dead man's son Will breaks with the plan and attempts to kill Patch on his own, but is mortally wounded by Patch. Patch explains to the dying youth that his late "father" had shot a man in the back many years ago, killing him. Patch covered it up because the murderer agreed to raise the dead man's young son as his own. Patch then pursued one of the instigators of the plot to kill him, a cynical saloon owner named Locke. He wounds, captures, and jails Locke, but then insists on going back out after the councilmen, probably aware that he may be gunned down. After stopping by the church, he is shot down on the town's main street by several riflemen on the rooftops. Claire is seen leaving town that night on a train.

== Cast ==
- Richard Widmark as Marshal Frank Patch
- Lena Horne as Claire Quintana
- Carroll O'Connor as Lester Locke
- David Opatoshu as Edward Rosenbloom
- Kent Smith as Andrew Oxley
- Jacqueline Scott as Laurie Mills
- Morgan Woodward as Ivan Stanek
- Larry Gates as Mayor Chester Sayre
- Dub Taylor as Doc Adams
- John Saxon as Sheriff Lou Trinidad
- Darleen Carr as Hilda Jorgenson
- Michael McGreevey as Dan Joslin
- Royal Dano as Arch Brandt
- Jimmy Lydon as Luke Mills (as James Lydon)
- Kathleen Freeman as Mary Elizabeth
- Harry Carey Jr. as Rev. Rork
- Amy Thomson as Angela
- Mercer Harris as Will Oxley
- James O'Hara as Father Sweeney
- Walter Sande as Paul Hammond
- Victor French as Phil Miller
- Robert Sorrells as Chris Hogg
- Charles Kuenstle as Roy Brandt
- Sara Taft as Mexican Woman

== Alan Smithee credit ==
The film began under the direction of Robert Totten, an experienced television director (Gunsmoke, The Legend of Jesse James). After clashes with star Widmark, and almost a year of work, he was dropped and replaced by Don Siegel, who'd recently directed Widmark in Madigan. When the film was finished, Siegel did not want his name to replace Totten's, and Totten did not want credit for a film that was completed in a way not in line with his creative vision. Widmark protested and an agreement was made with the Directors Guild of America for the pseudonym Alan Smithee to be used. The agreement was not publicized at the time, and the Smithee name was later used by the Guild on other films with a disputed director credit.

Despite the dispute, critics praised the film and its "new" director. The New York Times commented that the film was "sharply directed by Allen Smithee who has an adroit facility for scanning faces and extracting sharp background detail," Roger Ebert called the film "an extraordinary western ... director Allen Smithee, a name I'm not familiar with, allows his story to unfold naturally."

== See also ==
- List of American films of 1969
