= Jud Taylor =

American actor/director (1932–2008)

- Born: Judson Taylor; February 25, 1932; New York City, U.S.
- Died: August 6, 2008 (aged 76); New York City, U.S.
- Other name: Alan Smithee
- Occupations: Actor television director television producer
- Years active: 1965–2004
- Spouse: Lynn Kressel
- Children: 1

Judson Taylor (February 25, 1932 – August 6, 2008) was an American actor, television director, and television producer.

== Early years ==
Born in New York City, Taylor graduated from the University of California, Berkeley.

== Career ==
Taylor is perhaps best known for his directorial work on 1960s television shows such as Star Trek, Dr. Kildare, and The Man from U.N.C.L.E.. In the early 2000s, he directed several episodes of Law and Order: Special Victims Unit. Taylor also directed more than 40 made-for-TV movies, including the award-winning Tail Gunner Joe and Foxfire, and the final film appearances of both Susan Hayward in Say Goodbye, Maggie Cole (1972) and David Janssen in City in Fear (1980).

In the late 1950s and early 1960s, before becoming an established director, Taylor worked as an actor. He had a recurring role on Dr. Kildare as Dr. Gerson. He appeared in several episodes of The Fugitive and Twelve O'Clock High playing different characters. Other TV programs in which he had small roles included Gunsmoke, Men of Annapolis, and Wagon Train. He also played the part of Goff, one of three Americans, in the feature film The Great Escape and subsequently directed a made-for-TV sequel to the film titled The Great Escape II: The Untold Story (1988) starring Christopher Reeve. Two years later, he directed a television miniseries based on Ernest Hemingway's The Old Man and the Sea (1990 miniseries) starring Anthony Quinn in the role originally portrayed by Spencer Tracy in the earlier theatrical version.

Taylor was vice president of the Directors Guild of America from 1977 to 1981 and president from 1981 to 1983.

He died in New York City in 2008, following a long illness.

== Selected filmography ==
=== Actor ===
- Attack! (1956 World War II film) – Pvt. Jacob R. Abramowitz - radioman
- General Electric Theater (1 episode, 1957) – Bellboy
- The Garment Jungle (1957) – Latzo (uncredited)
- Gunsmoke (1 episode, 1957) – Ed Thorpe
- Harbormaster (1 episode, 1957) – Pete
- Men of Annapolis (2 episodes, 1957–1958) – Red Magruder / Weaver
- The Adventures of Rin Tin Tin (1 episode, 1959) – Charlie Buffalo
- Follow the Sun (1 episode, 1961) – Peter
- Wagon Train (1 episode, 1961) – Arthur
- Dr. Kildare (16 episodes, 1961–1965) – Dr. Thomas Gerson
- The Interns (1962) – Dr. Van Wyck (uncredited)
- The Great Escape (1963) – 2nd Lieutenant Goff
- The Fugitive (5 episodes, 1963–1965) – Sergeant Rainey / Toby Weems / Joey / Floyd (final television appearance)
- 12 O'Clock High (3 episodes, 1964–1965) – Lieutenant Morgan / Sergeant Loren / Lieutenant Harold Zimmerman

=== Director ===
- Dr. Kildare (10 episodes, 1965)
- The Man from U.N.C.L.E. (1 episode, 1965)
- A Man Called Shenandoah (6 episodes, 1965–1966)
- Ben Casey (1 episode, 1966)
- Shane (1 episode, 1966)
- The Girl from U.N.C.L.E. (1 episode, 1966)
- Felony Squad (1 episode, 1966)
- The Fugitive (1 episode, 1966)
- Captain Nice (1 episode, 1967)
- T.H.E. Cat (1 episode, 1967)
- The Second Hundred Years (1 episode, 1967)
- The Guns of Will Sonnett (1 episode, 1968)
- Judd, for the Defense (1 episode, 1968)
- Star Trek (5 episodes, 1968–1969)
- Then Came Bronson (8 episodes, 1969–1970)
- The Bold Ones: The New Doctors (Unknown episodes, 1969)
- Love, American Style (2 episodes, 1969)
- The Young Lawyers (Unknown episodes, 1970)
- The Interns (1 episode, 1971)
- Longstreet (1 episode, 1971)
- Mannix (1 episode, 1971)
- The Rookies (1 episode, 1972)
- Hawkins (4 episodes, 1973–1974)
- Sara (1 episode, 1976)
- Lou Grant (1 episode, 1977)
- Kung Fu: The Legend Continues (1 episode, 1993)
- Law & Order: Special Victims Unit (5 episodes, 2000–2004)

Writer

- Bob Hope Presents the Chrysler Theatre (1 episode, 1965)

==== TV movies ====
- Fade In (1968) (as Allen Smithee)
- Weekend of Terror (1970)
- Suddenly Single (1970)
- Revenge! (1971)
- Say Goodbye, Maggie Cole (1972)
- Egan (1973)
- Winter Kill (1974)
- The Disappearance of Flight 412 (1974)
- Search for the Gods (1975)
- Return to Earth (1976) (Also producer)
- Woman of the Year (1976) (Also producer)
- Mary White (1977)
- Tail Gunner Joe (1977)
- Christmas Miracle in Caufield, U.S.A. (1977) (aka The Christmas Coal Mine Miracle)
- The Last Tenant (1978)
- Lovey: A Circle of Children, Part II (1978)
- Flesh and Blood (1979)
- City in Fear (1980) (as Alan Smithee)
- Act of Love (1980)
- Incident at Crestridge (1981) (Also producer)
- A Question of Honor (1982)
- Packin' It In (1983)
- License to Kill (1984)
- Out of the Darkness (1985)
- Broken Vows (1987)
- Foxfire (1987)
- Doubletake (1988)
- The Great Escape II: The Untold Story (1988)
- The Old Man and the Sea (1990)
- Murder Times Seven (1990)
- Kaleidoscope (1990)
- In My Daughter's Name (1992)
- Prophet of Evil: The Ervil LeBaron Story (1993)
- Guinevere (1994)
- Secrets (1995)
- A Holiday to Remember (1995)
- Clover (1997)

== Awards and nominations ==
Year	Result	Award	Category	Film or series
1977	Nominated	Emmy Award	Outstanding Directing in a Special Program - Drama or Comedy	Tail Gunner Joe
1988	Won	Directors Guild of America Award	Outstanding Directorial Achievement in Dramatic Specials	Foxfire (Shared with Frederic B. Blankfein, John Eyler & Murray Schwartz)
2003	Won	Directors Guild of America Award	Robert B. Aldrich Award for Extraordinary Service to the Guild	-
