= Conrad Ricamora =

American actor (born 1979)

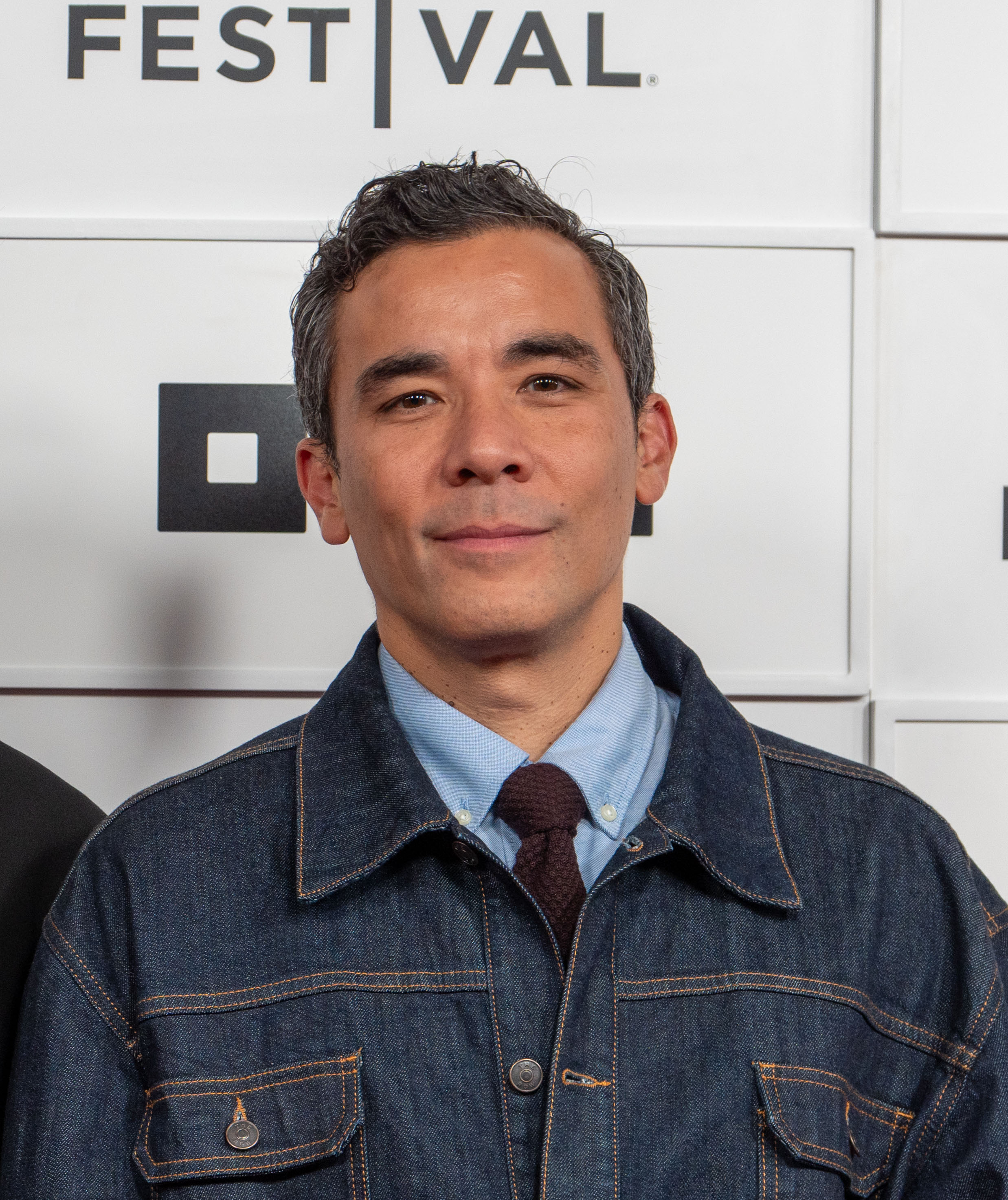
- Ricamora in 2026
- Born: Conrad Wayne Ricamora; February 17, 1979 (age 47); Santa Maria, California, U.S.
- Education: Queens University of Charlotte (BA); University of Tennessee (MFA)
- Occupation: Actor
- Years active: 2006–present
- Spouse: Peter Wesley Jensen (m. 2023)

Conrad Wayne Ricamora-Jensen (born February 17, 1979) is an American actor. He is best known for his portrayal of Oliver Hampton on the ABC television series How to Get Away with Murder (2014–20). As a stage actor, he is noted for his roles in the original Off-Broadway musicals Here Lies Love and Soft Power, which premiered in 2013 and 2019, respectively, as well as his role in Oh, Mary!, for which he received a nomination for the Tony Award for Best Featured Actor in a Play. He made his Broadway debut in the 2015 revival of The King and I. In addition to his Tony nomination, Ricamora is also a two-time Grammy Award, Drama Desk Award and Lucille Lortel Award nominee.

== Early life ==
Ricamora was born in Santa Maria, California. He is the son of Ron Ricamora, who was in the US Air Force, and social worker Debbie Bolender. His father was born in Manila, Philippines and moved to the US when he was 10. His father is believed to be of Filipino descent and is adopted, and his mother is of German and Irish descent. Ricamora grew up primarily in Niceville, Florida, and was an avid tennis player. He is gay and was honored with the Human Rights Campaign's Visibility Award.

Ricamora attended Queens University of Charlotte on a tennis scholarship, graduating with a degree in psychology in 2001. He graduated from the MFA acting program at University of Tennessee in 2012.

== Career ==
Ricamora was first introduced to acting during his undergraduate studies and, after graduating, took part in community theater in Charlotte, North Carolina and Philadelphia before attending acting school. Following graduation, Ricamora performed the role of Ninoy Aquino in the 2013 Off-Broadway musical, Here Lies Love, which had two runs at The Public Theater. He won a Theatre World Award and was nominated for a Lucille Lortel Award for Outstanding Lead Actor in a Musical.

In 2014, he was cast in the recurring role of Oliver Hampton on the ABC legal drama series How to Get Away with Murder. He continued to make guest appearances throughout the show's second season and was promoted to a series regular in season three. The show concluded after its sixth season in 2020.

Ricamora played Lun Tha in Lincoln Center Theater's 2015 Broadway revival of Rodgers and Hammerstein's The King and I, directed by Bartlett Sher. The 2015 Broadway cast recording of the musical received a Grammy Award nomination for Best Musical Theater Album.

In 2017, Ricamora rejoined the cast of Here Lies Love as Ninoy Aquino at the Seattle Repertory Theater.

In 2018, Ricamora starred in the premiere of David Henry Hwang's Soft Power as Xue Xing at the Ahmanson Theatre in Los Angeles and subsequently received a nomination for the Grammy Award for Best Musical Theater Album.

In 2024, Ricamora began playing Abraham Lincoln opposite Cole Escola as Mary Todd Lincoln in Oh, Mary!. The show transferred to Broadway in June 2024.

== Personal life ==
On July 29, 2023, in an Instagram post, Ricamora announced he had married Peter Wesley Jensen earlier in the month.

== Filmography ==
=== Film ===
Year	Title	Role	Notes
2006	Talladega Nights: The Ballad of Ricky Bobby	DMV Officer	
2017	The Light of the Moon	Jack	
2020	Over the Moon	Hou Yi (voice)	
2022	Fire Island	Will	
2026	The Devil Wears Prada 2	Andy's roommate	Deleted scenes
2026	The Last Day	Finn	Post-production

=== Television ===
Year	Title	Role	Notes
2014–2020	How to Get Away with Murder	Oliver Hampton	82 episodes; Recurring role (seasons 1-2); main role (seasons 3-6)
2017	Mental	Dr. Torres	Episode: "Dr. Bleiffer is on Maternity Leave"
2021–2023	The Resident	Dr. Jake Wong	Recurring role; 11 episodes
2024	How to Die Alone	Rory	Main cast
2025	Dying for Sex	Pet	Episode: "My Pet"

=== Theatre ===
Selected credits

Year	Title	Role	Venue	Notes
2011	Richard III	Sir James Tyrrel/Ensemble	Adams Shakespearean Theatre	Utah Shakespeare Festival
2011	A Midsummer Night's Dream	Tom Snout	Adams Shakespearean Theatre	Utah Shakespeare Festival
2011	Romeo and Juliet	Paris	Adams Shakespearean Theatre	Utah Shakespeare Festival
2012	Allegiance	Swing	The Old Globe	San Diego production
2012	Here Lies Love	Ninoy Aquino	Mass MOCA	Williamstown Theatre Festival
2013–2015	Here Lies Love	Ninoy Aquino	The Public Theater	Theatre World Award; Nominated—Lucille Lortel Award for Outstanding Lead Actor in a Musical
2015–2016	The King and I	Lun Tha	Vivian Beaumont Theatre	Nominated—Grammy Award for Best Musical Theater Album, Principal Soloist
2017	Here Lies Love	Ninoy Aquino	Seattle Repertory Theatre	Seattle production
2018	Soft Power	Xue Xing	Ahmanson Theatre	Los Angeles production
2018	Soft Power	Xue Xing	Curran Theater	San Francisco production
2019	Soft Power	Xue Xing	The Public Theater	Nominated—Grammy Award for Best Musical Theater Album (2021), Principal Soloist; Nominated—Lucille Lortel Award for Outstanding Lead Actor in a Musical
2022	Little Shop of Horrors	Seymour Krelborn	Westside Theatre	Off-Broadway Revival
2023	Here Lies Love	Ninoy Aquino	Broadway Theatre	Broadway production
2024	Oh, Mary!	Abraham Lincoln	Lucille Lortel Theatre	Off-Broadway production
2024–2025	Oh, Mary!	Abraham Lincoln	Lyceum Theatre	Broadway production Nominated—Tony Award for Best Featured Actor in a Play
2025	The Laramie Project	Various	Minetta Lane Theatre	25th anniversary staged reading
2026	A Chorus Line	Zach	Samsung Performing Arts Theater	Philippine production
2026	Disruption	Ben	Pershing Square Signature Center	Off-Broadway Production

== Awards and nominations ==
Year	Award	Category	Work	Result	Ref.
2013	Theatre World Award	Outstanding Debut	Here Lies Love	Won	
2014	Lucille Lortel Award	Outstanding Lead Actor in a Musical	Here Lies Love	Nominated	
2016	Grammy Award	Best Musical Theater Album	The King and I	Nominated	
2020	Drama Desk Award	Outstanding Featured Actor in a Musical	Soft Power	Nominated	
2020	Lucille Lortel Award	Outstanding Featured Actor in a Musical	Soft Power	Nominated	
2021	Grammy Award	Best Musical Theater Album	Soft Power	Nominated	
2024	Drama Desk Award	Outstanding Featured Performance in a Play	Oh, Mary!	Nominated	
2024	Outer Critics Circle Award	Outstanding Featured Performer in an Off-Broadway Play	Oh, Mary!	Nominated	
2024	Drama League Award	Distinguished Performance	Oh, Mary! and Here Lies Love	Nominated	
2025	Tony Award	Best Featured Actor in a Play	Oh, Mary!	Nominated	

== See also ==
- Filipinos in the New York metropolitan area
- LGBT culture in New York City
- List of LGBT people from New York City
- LGBT rights in New York
- NYC Pride March
