= Exposed (2016 film) =

- Theatrical release poster
- Directed by: Gee Malik Linton (as Declan Dale)
- Written by: Gee Malik Linton
- Produced by: Gee Malik Linton; Robin Gurland; Keanu Reeves; Jaclyn Ann Suri
- Starring: Ana de Armas; Keanu Reeves; Christopher McDonald; Big Daddy Kane; Mira Sorvino
- Cinematography: Trevor Forrest
- Edited by: Melody London
- Music by: Carlos José Alvarez
- Production companies: Emmett/Furla/Oasis Films; Grindstone Entertainment Group; PalmStar Entertainment; Remark Films
- Distributed by: Lionsgate Premiere
- Release date: January 22, 2016 (United States)
- Running time: 102 minutes
- Country: United States
- Languages: English; Spanish
- Box office: $269,915

Exposed (originally titled Daughter of God) is a 2016 American thriller film, written and directed by Gee Malik Linton (credited as Declan Dale, when he argued against the final edit changing the entire focus of the film), in his directorial debut. The film stars Ana de Armas, Keanu Reeves, Christopher McDonald, Big Daddy Kane, and Mira Sorvino. The film was released in a limited release and through video on demand on January 22, 2016, by Lionsgate Premiere.

== Plot ==
An NYPD police officer, Detective Galban, investigates the circumstances behind the death of his partner, Detective Joey Cullen. The mysterious case leads to an attempted police cover-up and a dangerous secret involving an unlikely young woman. The two parallel story lines initially appear to have little in common, but as events gradually unfold in the two separate urban worlds, the young woman, Isabel de La Cruz, appears to somehow be involved in the detective's demise.

Detective Cullen was depraved and corrupted. His colleagues fear that the investigation into his death will bring these facts to light. The results would include bad press for the police department and the loss of his pension for his family. The fear is based on the fact that one of the prime suspects in the case is a young ex-convict who had allegedly been sexually assaulted with a broomstick wielded by Detective Cullen. Supervisors within the precinct would rather let the murderer go free than to open up a Pandora's Box of troubles for everyone concerned.

Meanwhile, in Isabel's private world, she befriends a young girl named Elisa. Isabel suspects that Elisa is being abused at home by her father. She also believes that the strange beings she has begun seeing on the streets are angels. Accordingly, she thinks that her mysterious "impossible" pregnancy is a gift from God, which no one else is willing to believe. Isabel returns to her parents’ home to live. When Elisa says that Isabel's father has hurt her, it triggers a sudden recollection in Isabel's mind of molestation by her father many years ago. All of Isabel's buried memories are suddenly released in an avalanche of images. In truth, it turns out that Isabel's "angels" are a fabrication of her own mind. She created them to accompany a fictional narrative that would replace the unbearably traumatic memories of being raped by Detective Cullen on the subway platform the night that her "visions" began. She further suppressed the memory of catching him off guard afterwards and killing him in a fit of rage.

In response to the memories and to Elisa's crying, Isabel kills her father in order to protect Elisa. Detective Galban is then sent to the scene of the murder. When Galban looks at an old photograph of Isabel's family it is revealed that Elisa is also a fabrication of Isabel's mind. The imaginary girl is actually Isabel as a child. In the end Elisa disappears as Isabel is in church praying for the strength to accept everything that has happened.

== Cast ==
- Ana de Armas as Isabel de La Cruz
- Keanu Reeves as Detective Scott Galban
- Christopher McDonald as Lieutenant Galway
- Big Daddy Kane as Black
- Mira Sorvino as Janine Cullen
- Venus Ariel as Elisa
- Ariel Pacheco as Naldo
- Laura Gómez as Eva
- Melissa Linton as Detective Sarah Ramirez
- Michael Rispoli as Detective Dibronski
- Danny Hoch as Detective Joey Cullen
- Ismael Cruz Córdova as Jose de La Cruz
- Monte Greene as Anthony Galban (VO)
- Jeanette Dilone as Marisol de La Cruz
- Clara Wong as Albino Woman

== Production ==
=== Development ===
On September 6, 2014, it was announced that Keanu Reeves and Ana de Armas would star together in the movie Daughter of God, and that Reeves and Robin Gurland would be producers of the film. On November 7, Remark Films boarded on its first project to co-finance the film. On November 8, Mira Sorvino joined the film. The other cast include Christopher McDonald, Big Daddy Kane, Michael Rispoli, Laura Gómez. In December 2014, Carlos José Alvarez was set to score the film.

=== Filming ===
Principal photography began in early November 2014 in New York City. On November 26, filming was taking place in Brooklyn.

=== Controversy ===
The original story was a surreal bi-lingual drama, reminiscent of Pan's Labyrinth and Irreversible, that focused on child sexual abuse, violence against women, mass incarceration, and police violence committed under the pretense of the state's authority. However, the executives at Lionsgate Premiere thought they had been sold a Keanu Reeves cop-thriller. To increase the film's potential box office, during the editing process, Lionsgate changed the story into a crime thriller centered on Reeves' character. Director Gee Malik Linton disagreed with the changes and demanded that his name be removed from the final cut, which lists the director under the pseudonym of Declan Dale.

== Reception ==
=== Box office ===
Although the film has earned only $269,915 in worldwide theatrical box office, sales of its DVD/Blu-ray releases have earned $1.6 million.

=== Critical response ===
The film holds an approval rating of 8% on review aggregator Rotten Tomatoes, based on 25 reviews, with an average rating of 2.9/10. The website's critical consensus reads, "Exposed lays its flaws fittingly bare for all but the least discerning viewers to see, starting with a dull yet convoluted plot that utterly overpowers the efforts of an intriguing cast." On Metacritic, the film holds a score of 23 out of 100, based on 5 critics, indicating "generally unfavorable" reviews.

Frank Scheck of The Hollywood Reporter gave the film a mixed review writing: "There are glimpses here and there of the film Exposed might have been, especially through the well-photographed upper Manhattan locations that provide a memorably gritty atmosphere. But anyone looking for a good Reeves thriller would be well advised to wait until John Wick 2."

Mark Kermode, from The Guardian, compared the studio release with Daughter of God, the director's cut, on his YouTube show.

Indie film critic Saint Pauly wrote a comparison of both versions of the movie.

== See also ==
- Dissociative disorders
- Dissociative fugue
- Self-deception
