= Paul Lazar =

American actor (born 1955)

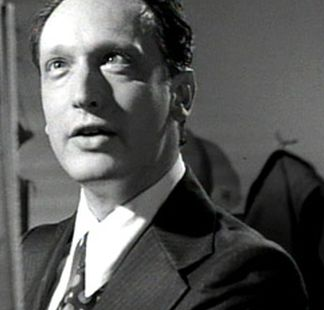
- Lazar in The Debt (1993)
- Born: March 26, 1955 (age 71)
- Occupations: Actor; theatre director
- Years active: c. 1983–present
- Spouse: Annie-B Parson
- Children: 1

Paul Lazar is an American actor and theatre director. He co-founded Brooklyn's Big Dance Theater with his wife Annie-B Parson and Molly Hickok. Lazar is also known for appearing in The Silence of the Lambs (1991) and collaborating with Bong Joon-ho on The Host (2006) and Snowpiercer (2013).

== Life and career ==
Lazar began activity in the theater in New York during the 1980s as a member of the Irondale Ensemble Project. He met his future wife Annie-B Parson around 1983, and has worked on numerous productions with her since. In 1991, they co-founded the troupe Big Dance Theater in Brooklyn with Molly Hickok. They have also had a son together. As of 2015, he teaches acting at Rutgers University.

Lazar has also appeared in several films including Married to the Mob (1988), The Silence of the Lambs (1991), and collaborating with Bong Joon-ho on The Host (2006) and Snowpiercer (2013).

== Selected filmography ==
- Streamers (1983)
- Married to the Mob (1988)
- Miami Vice (TV 1988) [1 episode; "Hostile Takeover"]
- The Silence of the Lambs (1991)
- The Debt (1993)
- Philadelphia (1993)
- Trapped in Paradise (1994)
- Buffalo Girls (TV 1995)
- The Stars Fell on Henrietta (1995)
- Lulu on the Bridge (1998)
- Beloved (1998)
- Mickey Blue Eyes (1999)
- Sex and the City (TV 2002) [1 episode; "Luck Be an Old Lady"]
- The Manchurian Candidate (2004)
- The Host (2006)
- Anamorph (2007)
- Snowpiercer (2013)
