= St. Vincent discography =

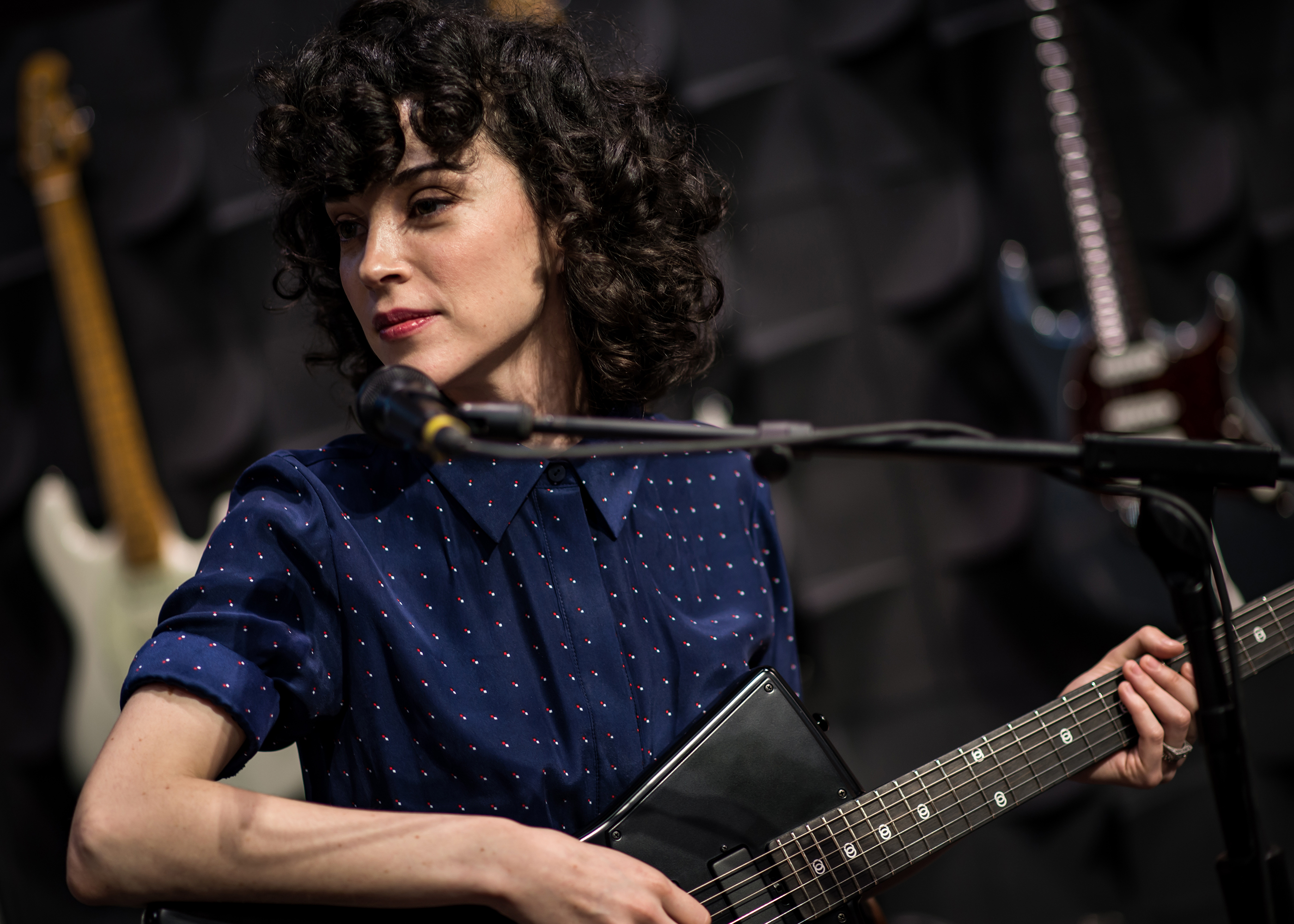
- St. Vincent at NAMM in 2017
- Studio albums: 8
- EPs: 4
- Singles: 22
- Music videos: 15
- Remixes: 3

The discography of St. Vincent, an American musician, consists of eight studio albums, two remix albums, four extended plays (EP), 22 singles and 15 music videos. Annie Clark began recording under the St. Vincent name in 2006 and released her debut studio album, Marry Me, the following year. Subsequent releases include Actor (2009), Strange Mercy (2011), and a collaborative album with David Byrne titled Love This Giant (2012). The self-titled St. Vincent album (2014) won a Grammy for Best Alternative Album. St. Vincent's fifth studio album, Masseduction, was released in 2017.

== Albums ==
=== Studio albums ===
List of studio albums, with selected chart positions
Title	Album details	Peak chart positions										Sales
Title	Album details	US	BEL (FL)	CAN	FRA	IRE	ITA	NLD	POR	SPA	UK	Sales
Marry Me	Released: July 10, 2007; Label: Beggars Banquet; Formats: CD, LP, digital download	— (Note: Marry Me did not enter the US Billboard 200 but peaked at number 32 on the Heatseekers Albums chart.)	—	—	—	—	—	—	—	—	—	
Actor	Released: May 4, 2009; Label: 4AD; Formats: CD, LP, digital download	90	—	—	—	—	—	—	—	—	161	US: 59,000
Strange Mercy	Released: September 12, 2011; Label: 4AD; Formats: CD, LP, digital download	19	—	63	—	—	—	—	—	—	117	UK: 7,500; US: 50,000
Love This Giant (with David Byrne)	Released: September 10, 2012; Label: 4AD, Todo Mundo; Formats: CD, LP, digital download	23	51	—	—	37	52	83	—	—	40	
St. Vincent	Released: February 25, 2014; Label: Loma Vista, Republic; Formats: CD, LP, digital download	12	37	15	200	6	58	41	—	70	21	US: 29,000
Masseduction	Released: October 13, 2017; Label: Loma Vista; Formats: CD, LP, digital download	10	36	31	183	5	52	42	27	76	6	US: 24,000; UK: 40,187
Daddy's Home	Released: May 14, 2021; Label: Loma Vista; Formats: CD, LP, digital download, cassette, 8-Track	16	11	48	188	7	66	13	7	48	4	
All Born Screaming	Released: April 26, 2024; Label: Virgin Music Group; Formats: Digital download, streaming	86	20	—	—	56	—	81	—	—	5	
"—" denotes releases that did not chart.

=== Soundtrack albums ===
List of studio albums, with selected chart positions
Title	Album details	Peak chart positions	
Title	Album details	US OST	US Sales
The Nowhere Inn	Released: September 19, 2021; Label: Loma Vista; Formats: CD, LP, digital download	14	51

=== Remix albums ===
List of remix albums, with selected chart positions
Title	Album details	Peak chart positions		
Title	Album details	US Sales	BE (FL)	UK
MassEducation	Released: October 12, 2018; Label: Loma Vista; Formats: LP, CD, digital download, streaming	71	195	81
Nina Kraviz Presents Masseduction Rewired	Released: December 13, 2018; Label: Loma Vista; Formats: LP, digital download, streaming	—	—	—
Todos Nacen Gritando	Released: November 15, 2024; Label: Total Pleasure; Formats: LP, CD, digital download, streaming	—	—	—

=== Live albums ===
Title	Album details
Stranger Mercy	Released: March 23, 2012; Label: 4AD; Formats: CD+DVD
Live in London!	Released: March 20, 2026; Label: Virgin; Formats: Digital download; streaming

== Extended plays ==
Title	EP details
Ratsliveonnoevilstar	Released: February 2, 2003; Label: Self-released
Paris Is Burning	Released: October 2006; Label: Self-released; Formats: CD
4AD Session	Released: April 10, 2012; Label: 4AD; Formats: Digital download, streaming
Brass Tactics (with David Byrne)	Released: May 28, 2013; Label: 4AD, Todo Mundo; Formats: CD, digital download, streaming

== Singles ==
List of singles as lead artist, with selected chart positions and certifications, showing year released and album name
Title	Year	Peak chart positions							Album
Title	Year	US Sales	US Alt.	US AAA	US Rock	BEL	MEX Ingl. Air.	SCO	Album
"Jesus Saves, I Spend"	2007	—	—	—	—	—	—	—	Marry Me
"Now, Now"	2007	—	—	—	—	—	—	—	Marry Me
"Actor Out of Work"	2009	—	—	—	—	—	—	—	Actor
"Marrow"	2009	—	—	—	—	—	—	—	Actor
"Surgeon"	2011	—	—	—	—	—	—	—	Strange Mercy
"Cruel"	2011	—	—	—	—	—	—	—	Strange Mercy
"Cheerleader"	2012	—	—	—	—	—	—	—	Strange Mercy
"Krokodil"	2012	—	—	—	—	—	—	—	Non-album single
"Who" (with David Byrne)	2012	—	—	—	—	—	46	—	Love This Giant
"I Should Watch TV" (with David Byrne)	2012	—	—	—	—	—	39	—	Love This Giant
"Birth in Reverse"	2013	—	—	—	—	—	45	—	St. Vincent
"Digital Witness"	2014	17	—	—	—	—	40	—	St. Vincent
"Prince Johnny"	2014	—	—	—	—	—	38	—	St. Vincent
"Pieta"	2014	5	—	—	—	—	—	—	St. Vincent
"Bad Believer"	2015	—	—	—	—	—	37	—	St. Vincent
"Teenage Talk"	2015	—	—	—	—	—	—	—	Girls, Vol. 3 (Music from the HBO Original Series)
"New York"	2017	—	—	22	44	32	39	—	Masseduction
"Los Ageless"	2017	—	23	6	37	—	41	96	Masseduction
"Pills"	2017	—	—	—	44	156	—	—	Masseduction
"Masseduction"	2018	—	—	—	—	—	—	—	Masseduction
"Fast Slow Disco"	2018	—	—	—	—	101	—	—	Non-album single
"Slow Slow Disco"	2018	—	—	—	—	—	—	—	MassEducation
"Piggy"	2020	—	—	—	—	—	—	—	Non-album singles
"New York" (featuring Yoshiki)	2020	—	—	—	—	—	—	—	Non-album singles
"Pay Your Way in Pain"	2021	—	32	17	— (Note: "Pay Your Way in Pain" did not enter the Hot Rock & Alternative Songs chart but peaked at number 29 on the Rock & Alternative Airplay chart.)	171	—	—	Daddy's Home
"The Melting of the Sun"	2021	—	—	—	—	—	—	—	Daddy's Home
"Women and Wives" (with Paul McCartney)	2021	—	—	—	—	—	—	—	McCartney III Imagined
"Down"	2021	—	—	16	—	188	—	—	Daddy's Home
"Daddy's Home"	2021	—	—	—	—	—	—	—	Daddy's Home
"The Nowhere Inn"	2021	—	—	—	—	—	—	—	The Nowhere Inn
"Funkytown"	2022	—	—	—	—	—	—	—	Minions: The Rise of Gru (Original Motion Picture Soundtrack)
"Broken Man"	2024	—	16	18	—	—	—	—	All Born Screaming
"Flea"	2024	—	29	—	—	—	—	—	All Born Screaming
"Big Time Nothing"	2024	—	—	—	—	—	—	—	All Born Screaming
"DOA"	2025	—	—	—	—	—	—	—	Death of a Unicorn (Original Motion Picture Soundtrack)
"Always the Same" (with Cate Le Bon)	2026	—	—	—	—	—	—	—	Non-album single
"—" denotes releases that did not chart.

== Other certified songs ==
Title	Year	Certifications	Album
"Rosyln" (with Bon Iver)	2009	BPI: Gold; RMNZ: Platinum	The Twilight Saga: New Moon soundtrack

== Other appearances ==
List of guest appearances, with other performing artists, showing year released and album name
Title	Year	Other artist(s)	Album
"Count" (as Annie Clark)	2003	none	Dorm Sessions Vol. 1
All album songs (as Annie Clark) (guitar, backing vocals)	2008	The Mountain Goats	Heretic Pride
"What's the Use of Wondrin'?"	2008	Amanda Palmer	Who Killed Amanda Palmer
"Sleep All Summer"	2009	The National	Score! 20 Years of Merge Records: The Covers!
"Need You Tonight"	2010	Beck's Record Club	Kick
"Never Tear Us Apart"	2010	Beck's Record Club	Kick
"Calling All Nations"	2010	Beck's Record Club	Kick
"Maniac"	2010	Kid Cudi	Man on the Moon II: The Legend of Mr. Rager
"My Shepherd"	2010	The New Pornographers	Together
"Every Drop of Rain"	2010	David Byrne, Fatboy Slim	Here Lies Love
"Sisters of the Moon"	2012	Craig Wedren	Just Tell Me That You Want Me – A Tribute to Fleetwood Mac
"The Antidote"	2012	none	The Twilight Saga: Breaking Dawn – Part 2 (Original Motion Picture Soundtrack)
"Early Autumn"	2013	none	Gangster Squad: Music from and Inspired by the Motion Picture
"Make Believe"	2013	none	Boardwalk Empire Volume 2: Music from the HBO Original Series
"Screen Shot"	2014	Swans	To Be Kind
"Bring the Sun / Toussaint L'Ouverture"	2014	Swans	To Be Kind
"Kirsten Supine"	2014	Swans	To Be Kind
"Nathalie Neal"	2014	Swans	To Be Kind
"Under Neon Lights"	2015	The Chemical Brothers	Born in the Echoes
"Emotional Rescue"	2016	none	A Bigger Splash (Original Motion Picture Soundtrack)
"Bad Girls (Bob's Buskers)"	2017	none	The Bob's Burgers Music Album
"And Then She Kissed Me"	2018	none	Universal Love – Wedding Songs Reimagined
"Wouldn't Want To Be Like You"	2019	Sheryl Crow	Threads
"Cruel Summer"	2019	Taylor Swift	Lover
"Chalk Tablet Towers"	2020	Gorillaz	Song Machine, Season One: Strange Timez
"Obsessed"	2024	Olivia Rodrigo	Guts (Spilled)
"Pain for Fun"	2024	Willow	Empathogen

== Remixes ==
List of non-single guest appearances, with other performing artists, showing year released and album name
Title	Year	Artist(s)	Album
"Sex Karma"	2011	of Montreal featuring Solange	Japan 3-11-11: A Benefit Album
"Girls Like You"	2018	Maroon 5 featuring Cardi B	Red Pill Blues (Mexico Tour Edition)
"Uneventful Days"	2020	Beck	Hyperspace (2020)

== Music videos ==
List of music videos, showing year released and directors
Title	Year	Director
"Jesus Saves, I Spend"	2007	Andy Bruntel
"Actor Out Of Work"	2009	Terri Timely
"Marrow"	2009	Terri Timely
"Cruel"	2011	Terri Timely
"Cheerleader"	2012	Hiro Murai
"Digital Witness"	2014	Chino Moya
"Birth In Reverse"	2014	Willo Perron
"New York"	2017	Alex Da Corte
"Los Ageless"	2017	Willo Perron
"Pills"	2017	Philippa Price
"Fast Slow Disco"	2018	Zev Deans
"Masseduction"	2019	Unknown
"Pay Your Way In Pain"	2021	Bill Benz
"The Melting Of The Sun"	2021	Chris McD
"Down"	2021	Bill Benz
"Daddy's Home"	2021	Bill Benz
"The Nowhere Inn"	2021	Bill Benz
"Broken Man"	2024	Alex Da Corte
