= Actor Tour =

2009–10 concert tour by St. Vincent

- Tour by St. Vincent
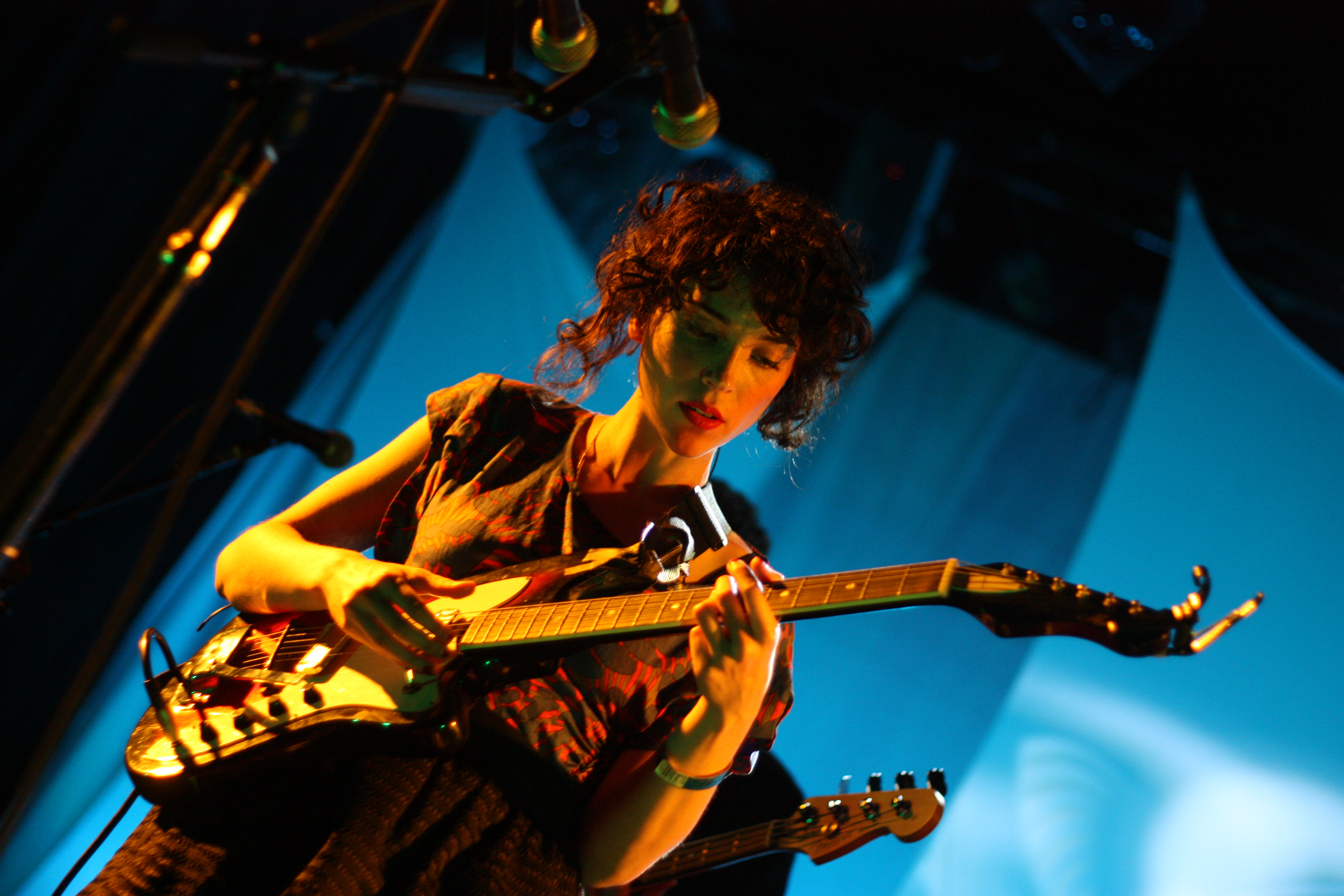
- St. Vincent performing during the tour
- Associated album: Actor
- Start date: February 27, 2009
- End date: December 3, 2010
- No. of shows: 89 in North America; 45 in Europe; 3 in Asia; 1 in Oceania; 138 Total

St. Vincent concert chronology
- Marry Me Tour (2007–08); Actor Tour (2009–10); Strange Mercy Tour (2011–12)

The Actor Tour is the second tour by American musician St. Vincent. The tour centered on her second album, Actor (2009). The tour began in the Great American Music Hall in San Francisco, United States, on February 27, 2009, and concluded at Teatro de la Ciudad in Mexico City, Mexico, on December 3, 2010.

== Opening acts ==
- Pattern Is Movement
- Wildbirds and Peacedrums

=== Opened for ===
- Andrew Bird
- Grizzly Bear

== Setlist ==
The following set list was obtained from the concert held on 18 June 2009 at the Granada Theater in Dallas. It does not represent all concerts for the duration of the tour.

1. "Marry Me"
2. "The Strangers"
3. "Save Me from What I Want"
4. "Now Now"
5. "Actor Out of Work"
6. "Paris Is Burning"
7. "The Bed"
8. "Laughing with a Mouth of Blood"
9. "Black Rainbow"
10. "Marrow"
11. "Just the Same But Brand New"

Encore

12. "The Party"
13. "Your Lips Are Red"

== Songs performed ==
| # | Song | Album |
|---|---|---|
| 47 | "Marrow" | Actor |
| 45 | "Actor Out of Work" | Actor |
| 44 | "The Strangers" | Actor |
| 43 | "Your Lips Are Red" | Marry Me |
| 41 | "Save Me from What I Want" | Actor |
| 41 | "Black Rainbow" | Actor |
| 40 | "Laughing with a Mouth of Blood " | Actor |
| 39 | "The Party" | Actor |
| 35 | "Just the Same but Brand New" | Actor |
| 22 | "The Bed" | Actor |
| 20 | "Now Now" | Marry Me |
| 20 | "Jesus Saves, I Spend" | Marry Me |
| 18 | "Marry Me" | Marry Me |
| 14 | "Dig a Pony" (Beatles cover) | Let It Be |
| 13 | "These Days" (Jackson Browne cover) | For Everyman |
| 9 | "Paris Is Burning | Marry Me |
| 6 | "Oh My God" | Actor |
| 2 | "Human Racing" | Marry Me |
| 2 | "Landmines" | Marry Me |
| 1 | "What Me Worry" | Marry Me |
| 1 | "Happy Birthday" (Mildred J. Hill and Patty Hill cover) | – |
| 1 | "Roslyn" w/ Bon Iver | The Twilight Saga: New Moon |
| 1 | "The Neighbors" | Actor |
| 1 | "Who" w/ David Byrne | Love This Giant |

== Tour dates ==
List of concerts, showing date, city, country and venue.
| Date | City | Country | Venue |
North America
| February 27, 2009 (Note: This concert was a part of Noise Pop Festival.) | San Francisco | United States | Great American Music Hall |
| March 18, 2009 (Note: These concerts were a part of SXSW.) | Austin | United States | Central Presbyterian Church |
| March 20, 2009 | Austin | United States | Antone's Nightclub |
Europe
| April 21, 2009 | London | England | Hoxton Square Bar and Kitchen |
| April 23, 2009 | Brussels | Belgium | L'Archiduc |
| April 26, 2009 (Note: This concert was a part of Les femmes s'en mêlent Festival.) | Paris | France | La Maroquinerie |
| April 27, 2009 | Amsterdam | Netherlands | Paradiso |
| April 28, 2009 | Hamburg | Germany | Grüner Jäger |
North America
| May 19, 2009 | Somerville | United States | Somerville Theatre |
| May 20, 2009 | New York City | United States | Webster Hall |
| May 21, 2009 | Philadelphia | United States | First Unitarian Church of Philadelphia |
| May 22, 2009 | Washington, D.C. | United States | Black Cat |
| May 24, 2009 (Note: This concert was a part of Sasquatch! Music Festival.) | George | United States | The Gorge Amphitheatre |
| May 25, 2009 | Portland | United States | Aladdin Theater |
| May 27, 2009 | San Francisco | United States | Bimbo's 365 Club |
| May 28, 2009 | Los Angeles | United States | El Rey Theatre |
| May 30, 2009 | San Diego | United States | The Casbah |
| May 31, 2009 | Phoenix | United States | Modified Arts |
| June 2, 2009 | Denver | United States | Bluebird Theater |
| June 3, 2009 | Omaha | United States | The Slowdown |
| June 4, 2009 | Minneapolis | United States | First Avenue |
| June 5, 2009 | Milwaukee | United States | Pabst Theater |
| June 7, 2009 | Chicago | United States | Metro Chicago |
| June 8, 2009 (Note: This concert was a part of Downtown Sound.) | Chicago | United States | Jay Pritzker Pavilion |
| June 9, 2009 | Newport | United States | Southgate House |
| June 10, 2009 | Lexington | United States | The Dame |
| June 11, 2009 | Nashville | United States | Cannery Ballroom |
| June 12, 2009 (Note: This concert was a part of Bonnaroo Music Festival.) | Manchester | United States | Great Stage Park |
| June 13, 2009 | Athens | United States | 40 Watt Club |
| June 14, 2009 | Atlanta | United States | The EARL |
| June 16, 2009 | Birmingham | United States | Bottletree Cafe |
| June 18, 2009 | Dallas | United States | Granada Theater |
| June 19, 2009 | Austin | United States | Mohawk Austin |
Europe
| July 2, 2009 (Note: This concert was a part of Roskilde Festival.) | Roskilde | Denmark | Festivalpladsen |
| July 3, 2009 | Malmö | Sweden | Debaser |
| July 4, 2009 | Rotterdam | Netherlands | Rotown |
| July 5, 2009 (Note: This concert was a part of Wireless Festival.) | London | England | Hyde Park |
| July 6, 2009 | Bristol | England | Thekla |
| July 8, 2009 | London | England | Institute of Contemporary Arts |
| July 9, 2009 (Note: This concert was a part of Traffic Festival.) | Venaria Reale | Italy | Palace of Venaria |
| July 11, 2009 (Note: This concert was a part of Oxegen Festival.) | County Kildare | Ireland | Punchestown Racecourse |
| July 13, 2009 | Manchester | England | The Night and Day Café |
| July 14, 2009 | Glasgow | Scotland | Nice N Sleazy |
| July 16, 2009 | Utrecht | Netherlands | Tivoli |
| July 17, 2009 (Note: This concert was a part of Dour Festival.) | Dour | Belgium | Festivalpark Dour |
| July 18, 2009 (Note: This concert was a part of Latitude Festival.) | Southwold | England | Henham Park |
| July 19, 2009 | Antwerp | Belgium | Openluchttheater Rivierenhof |
| July 20, 2009 (Note: This concert was a part of the de-Affaire Festival.) | Nijmegen | Netherlands | Valkhof Park |
North America
| August 1, 2009 (Note: This concert was a part of All Points West Music & Arts Festival.) | Jersey City | United States | Liberty State Park |
| August 5, 2009 | Dennis | United States | Cape Cinema |
| August 6, 2009 | Northampton | United States | Pearl Street Nightclub |
| August 7, 2009 | Montreal | Canada | La Sala Rossa |
| August 8, 2009 | Toronto | Canada | Horseshoe Tavern |
| August 9, 2009 | Hamilton | Canada | Rokbar |
Europe
| August 13, 2009 (Note: This concert was a part of Way Out West.) | Gothenburg | Sweden | Slottsskogen |
| August 15, 2009 (Note: This concert was a part of La Route du Rock.) | Saint-Malo | France | Fort de Saint-Père |
North America
| August 30, 2009 (Note: This concert was a part of Virgin Festival FREEFEST.) | Columbia | United States | Merriweather Post Pavilion |
| September 29, 2009 | Indianapolis | United States | Murat Theatre |
| September 30, 2009 | Columbia | United States | The Blue Note |
| October 1, 2009 | St. Louis | United States | The Firebird |
| October 3, 2009 | New Orleans | United States | Tipitina's |
| October 5, 2009 | Birmingham | United States | WorkPlay Soundstage |
| October 7, 2009 | Carrboro | United States | Cat's Cradle |
| October 8, 2009 | Carrboro | United States | Cat's Cradle |
| October 9, 2009 | Asheville | United States | The Orange Peel |
| October 10, 2009 | Nashville | United States | Ryman Auditorium |
| October 12, 2009 | Charleston | United States | Music Farm |
| October 13, 2009 | Knoxville | United States | Bijou Theatre |
| October 14, 2009 | Cincinnati | United States | Bogart's |
| October 16, 2009 | Madison | United States | High Noon Saloon |
| October 17, 2009 | Milwaukee | United States | Pabst Theater |
| October 18, 2009 | Kalamazoo | United States | State Theatre |
| October 19, 2009 | Columbus | United States | Great Southern Hotel & Theatre |
| October 20, 2009 | Cleveland | United States | The Beachland Ballroom |
| October 21, 2009 | Buffalo | United States | Asbury Hall at Babeville |
| October 22, 2009 | Ithaca | United States | Castaways |
| October 24, 2009 | South Portland | United States | South Portland Auditorium |
| October 25, 2009 | Philadelphia | United States | Electric Factory |
| October 26, 2009 | South Burlington | United States | Higher Ground |
| October 27, 2009 | Providence | United States | Lupo's Heartbreak Hotel |
| October 28, 2009 | Washington, D.C. | United States | 9:30 Club |
Europe
| October 31, 2009 | London | England | Barbican Centre |
| November 1, 2009 | Dublin | Ireland | Vicar Street |
| November 2, 2009 | Glasgow | Scotland | O_{2} ABC Glasgow |
| November 4, 2009 | Manchester | England | Manchester Cathedral |
| November 5, 2009 | Leeds | England | Leeds Metropolitan University |
| November 6, 2009 | Bristol | England | Anson Rooms |
| November 8, 2009 | Brussels | Belgium | Cirque Royal |
| November 9, 2009 | Amsterdam | Netherlands | Melkweg |
| November 10, 2009 | Hamburg | Germany | Gruenspan |
| November 11, 2009 | Berlin | Germany | Postbahnhof am Ostbahnhof |
| November 12, 2009 | Munich | Germany | Theaterfabrik |
| November 15, 2009 | Fribourg | Switzerland | Fri-Son |
| November 16, 2009 | Vienna | Austria | WUK |
| November 17, 2009 | Basel | Switzerland | Volkshaus Basel |
| November 19, 2009 | Cologne | Germany | Kulturkirche Köln |
| November 20, 2009 (Note: This concert was a part of Crossing Border Festival.) | The Hague | Netherlands | Koninklijke Schouwburg |
| November 21, 2009 | Paris | France | La Cigale |
| November 24, 2009 | Copenhagen | Denmark | Vega |
| November 25, 2009 | Oslo | Norway | Rockefeller Music Hall |
| November 26, 2009 | Stockholm | Sweden | Debaser Medis |
North America
| January 29, 2010 | New York City | United States | Jazz at Lincoln Center |
| February 3, 2010 | Victoria | Canada | Element Nightclub |
| February 4, 2010 | Vancouver | Canada | Venue Nightclub |
| February 5, 2010 | Seattle | United States | Neumos |
| February 6, 2010 (Note: This date included an early and a late show.) | Portland | United States | Doug Fir Lounge |
| February 8, 2010 | San Francisco | United States | Great American Music Hall |
| February 9, 2010 | Los Angeles | United States | El Rey Theatre |
| February 10, 2010 | Solana Beach | United States | Belly Up Tavern |
| February 11, 2010 | Phoenix | United States | Rhythm Room |
| February 13, 2010 | Denver | United States | Bluebird Theater |
| February 15, 2010 | Lawrence | United States | The Bottleneck |
| February 16, 2010 | Iowa City | United States | The Industry |
| February 17, 2010 | Milwaukee | United States | Turner Hall |
| February 18, 2010 | Chicago | United States | Metro Chicago |
| February 19, 2010 | Pontiac | United States | The Crofoot |
| February 20, 2010 | Columbus | United States | Outland on Liberty |
| February 21, 2010 | Pittsburgh | United States | Diesel Club |
| February 23, 2010 | Charlottesville | United States | Jefferson Theater |
| February 24, 2010 | Washington, D.C. | United States | 9:30 Club |
| February 25, 2010 | Philadelphia | United States | First Unitarian Church of Philadelphia |
Asia
| March 12, 2010 (Note: These concerts were a part of JUE Music + Art Festival.) | Beijing | China | Yugong Yishan |
| March 13, 2010 | Shanghai | China | Yuyintang |
| March 15, 2010 (Note: This concert was a part of Mosaic Music Festival.) | Singapore | Singapore | Esplanade – Theatres on the Bay |
Oceania
| March 18, 2010 (Note: This concert was a part of New Zealand International Arts Festival.) | Wellington | New Zealand | Pacific Blue Festival Club |
North America
| March 28, 2010 (Note: This concert was a part of Big Ears Festival.) | Knoxville | United States | Bijou Theatre |
| March 30, 2010 | Champaign | United States | The Highdive |
| March 31, 2010 (Note: This concert was a part of MusicNOW Festival.) | Cincinnati | United States | Hamilton County Memorial Building |
| April 28, 2010 | Chapel Hill | United States | UNC Memorial Hall |
Europe
| July 12, 2010 (Note: This concert was a part of Nuits de Fourvière.) | Lyon | France | Ancient Theatre of Fourvière |
| July 14, 2010 | Dachau | Germany | Rathausplatz |
| July 16, 2010 (Note: This concert was a part of Super Bock Super Rock.) | Sesimbra | Portugal | Praia do Meco |
North America
| July 18, 2010 (Note: This concert was a part of Pitchfork Music Festival.) | Chicago | United States | Union Park |
| July 24, 2010 (Note: This concert was a part of Calgary Folk Music Festival.) | Calgary | Canada | Prince's Island Park |
| August 1, 2010 (Note: This concert was a part of Central Park Summerstage.) | New York City | United States | Central Park |
| September 18, 2010 | Storrs | United States | UConn South Campus Quad |
| December 3, 2010 | Mexico City | Mexico | Teatro de la Ciudad |

== Personnel ==
- St. Vincent – Vocals, lead guitar
- Anthony LaMarca (2009–2010) – Drums, sampler
- Daniel Hart (2009–10) – Violin, Guitar, Vocals
- Evan Smith (2009–10) – Flute, Clarinet, Saxophone, Keyboards, Vocals
- William Flynn (2009-Beginning of 2010) – Bass, Vocals, Clarinet
- Andrew Carlson (End of 2010) – Bass, Vocals, Clarinet
