= Broken Man (song) =

Single by St. Vincent

from the album All Born Screaming
- Released: February 29, 2024
- Recorded: 2024
- Genre: Rock
- Length: 3:22
- Label: Total Pleasure; Virgin
- Songwriter: Annie Clark
- Producer: Annie Clark

St. Vincent singles chronology
"Piggy" (2022)	"Broken Man" (2024)	"Flea" (2024)

"Broken Man" is the first single from All Born Screaming, the seventh album by the American musician St. Vincent.

St. Vincent described the song's lyrics as the "feeling of the rawness, the brokenness, the violence, that we all have inside of us". The song was released alongside a music video, which was directed by Alex Da Corte.

== Background ==
St. Vincent took inspiration for the song from the paintings of Francisco Goya. She said, "We took a lot of inspiration from the feeling of those Goya Black Paintings."

Clark noted that she wanted to explore sounds she had left previously untouched, saying: "I am physically moving electricity around, I’m playing with currents."

== Composition ==
Annie Clark described her song as "a slow burn", alluding to the song's gradual build-up of sound. She added "the shape of the song is climbing the mountain, because it just grows and grows."

The song features three drum tracks. The first was programmed by St. Vincent, the second by Mark Guiliana, and the third by Dave Grohl. Clark noted that Grohl: "comes in with this absolute reckless spirit and just takes it to the edge."

== Release ==
The song was chosen as the lead single for Clark's album All Born Screaming, and was released on February 29, 2024.

== Music video ==
The music video for "Broken Man" was released on February 29, 2024, accompanying the song's release on streaming. The video depicts Clark dancing in a pitch-black room, while flames appear over parts of her body. The dance moves portrayed by Clark in the video reference various moves in her career, such as a dance from the music video for "Pay Your Way in Pain" from her previous album "Daddy's Home". The music video for "Broken Man" was directed by Alex Da Corte.

== Critical reception ==
"Broken Man" saw a positive critical reception upon release. NME called the song an "industrial menacing rock beast", and AP News compared the song's sound to Nine Inch Nails.

Radio Milwaukee commented, "St. Vincent fans should be delighted she’s going full-throttle, and a lot of it has to do with Clark being planted squarely behind the mixing desk."

Billboard placed "Broken Man" at #47 in its end-of-year list of the Top 100 songs of 2024, stating, "The song – tinged with dark imagery ("Lover, nail yourself right to me") – builds tension all the way through with screaming guitars and quickening bass until there is nothing left but Annie Clark's scream to close out one the best rock songs of the year."

At the 67th Annual Grammy Awards in 2025, "Broken Man" won the award for Best Rock Song. This made Clark a two-time winner of the award, having won previously for her song "Masseduction" at the 61st Annual Grammy Awards in 2019.

"Broken Man" was also nominated for Best Rock Performance, which it lost to Now and Then by The Beatles.

== Personnel ==
- Annie Clark - lead vocals, synthesizer, drum programming, guitar, modular synthesizer
- Justin Meldal-Johnsen - bass
- Mark Guiliana - drums
- Dave Grohl - drums
- David Ralicke - saxophone
