= Paris Is Burning =

Paris Is Burning may refer to:

- Paris Is Burning (film), a 1990 documentary film
- "Paris Is Burning" (Gilmore Girls), the eleventh episode of Gilmore Girls' first season
- "Paris Is Burning", a song from the 1983 album Breaking the Chains by Dokken
- Paris Is Burning (EP), an extended play by musician Annie Clark
- "Paris Is Burning" (song), a 2008 single by Ladyhawke

== See also ==
- Is Paris Burning? (disambiguation)
