= Love This Giant Tour =

2012–13 concert tour by David Byrne and St. Vincent

- Tour by David Byrne and St. Vincent
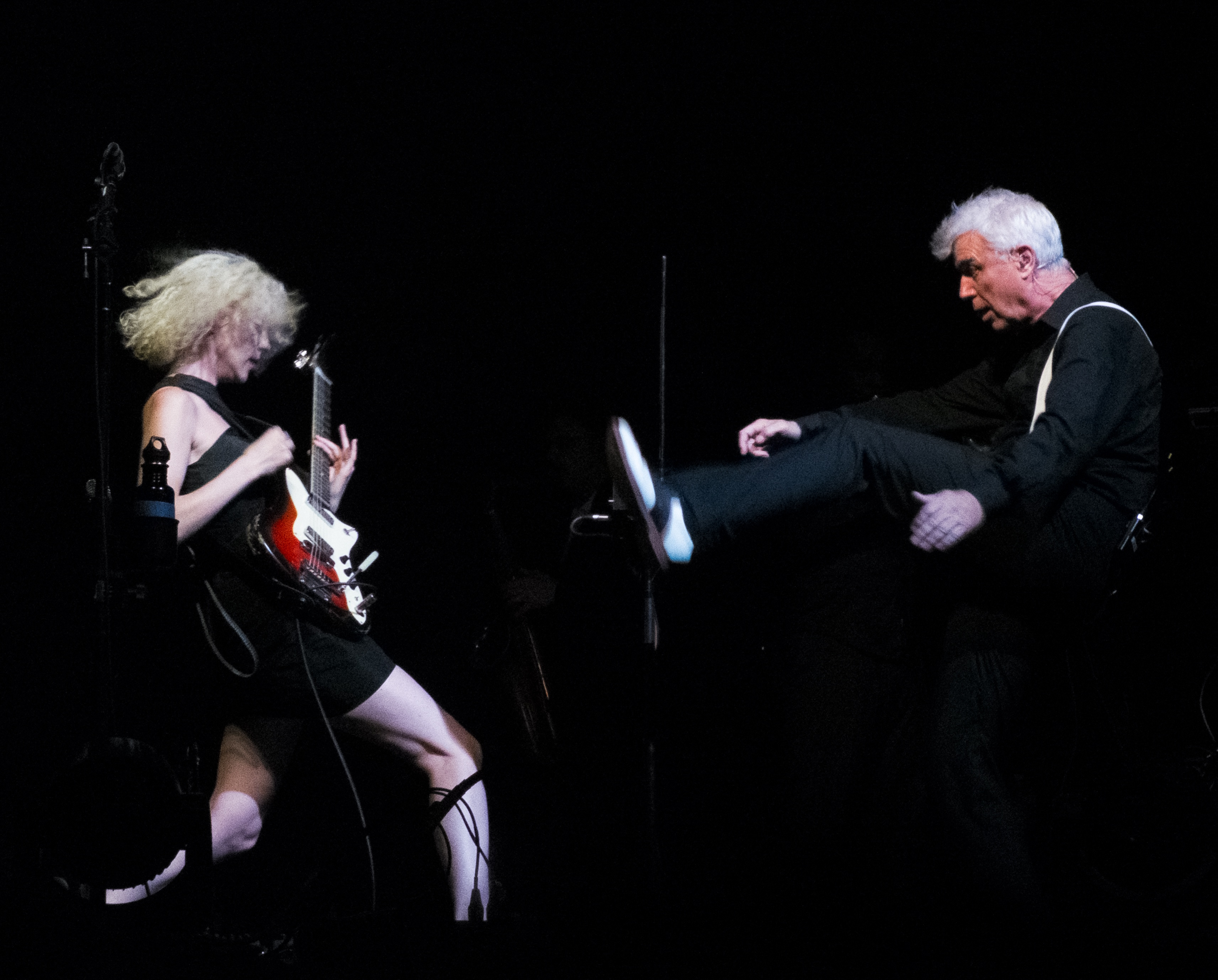
- David Byrne and St. Vincent performing in Padua in September 2013
- Associated album: Love This Giant
- Start date: September 15, 2012
- End date: September 12, 2013
- No. of shows: 52 in North America; 5 in Oceania; 17 in Europe; 74 Total
David Byrne tour chronology
Songs of David Byrne and Brian Eno Tour (2008–09)	Love This Giant Tour (2012–13)	American Utopia Tour (2018)
St. Vincent tour chronology
Strange Mercy Tour (2011–12)	Love This Giant Tour (2012–13)	Digital Witness Tour (2014–15)

The Love This Giant Tour was a joint tour by American musicians David Byrne and St. Vincent. It started on 15 September 2012 in Minneapolis, United States, and ended on 12 September 2013 in Florence, Italy, after 74 concerts on 14 countries and 3 continents. The tour was officially announced along with Love This Giant, the album it promoted, on 14 June 2012. On the stage, they were accompanied by a backing band consisting of eight brass players, a keyboardist and a drummer. The performers engaged in complex choreography onstage while performing.

== Set list ==
The following set list was obtained from the concert held on 29 September 2012 at Williamsburg Park in New York City. It does not represent all concerts for the duration of the tour.

1. "Who"
2. "Weekend in the Dust"
3. "Save Me from What I Want" (St. Vincent song)
4. "Strange Overtones" (David Byrne & Brian Eno song)
5. "I am an Ape"
6. "Marrow" (St. Vincent song)
7. "This Must Be the Place (Naive Melody)" (Talking Heads song)
8. "The Forest Awakes"
9. "Ice Age"
10. "Like Humans Do" (David Byrne song)
11. "Lightning"
12. "Lazarus"
13. "Cheerleader" (St. Vincent song)
14. "Lazy" (X-Press 2 song featuring David Byrne)
15. "I Should Watch TV"
16. "Northern Lights" (St. Vincent song)
17. "The One Who Broke Your Heart"
18. "Outside of Space and Time"

Encore

19. "Cruel" (St. Vincent song)
20. "Burning Down the House" (Talking Heads song)

Second encore

21. "The Party" (St. Vincent song)
22. "Road to Nowhere" (Talking Heads song)

== Tour dates ==
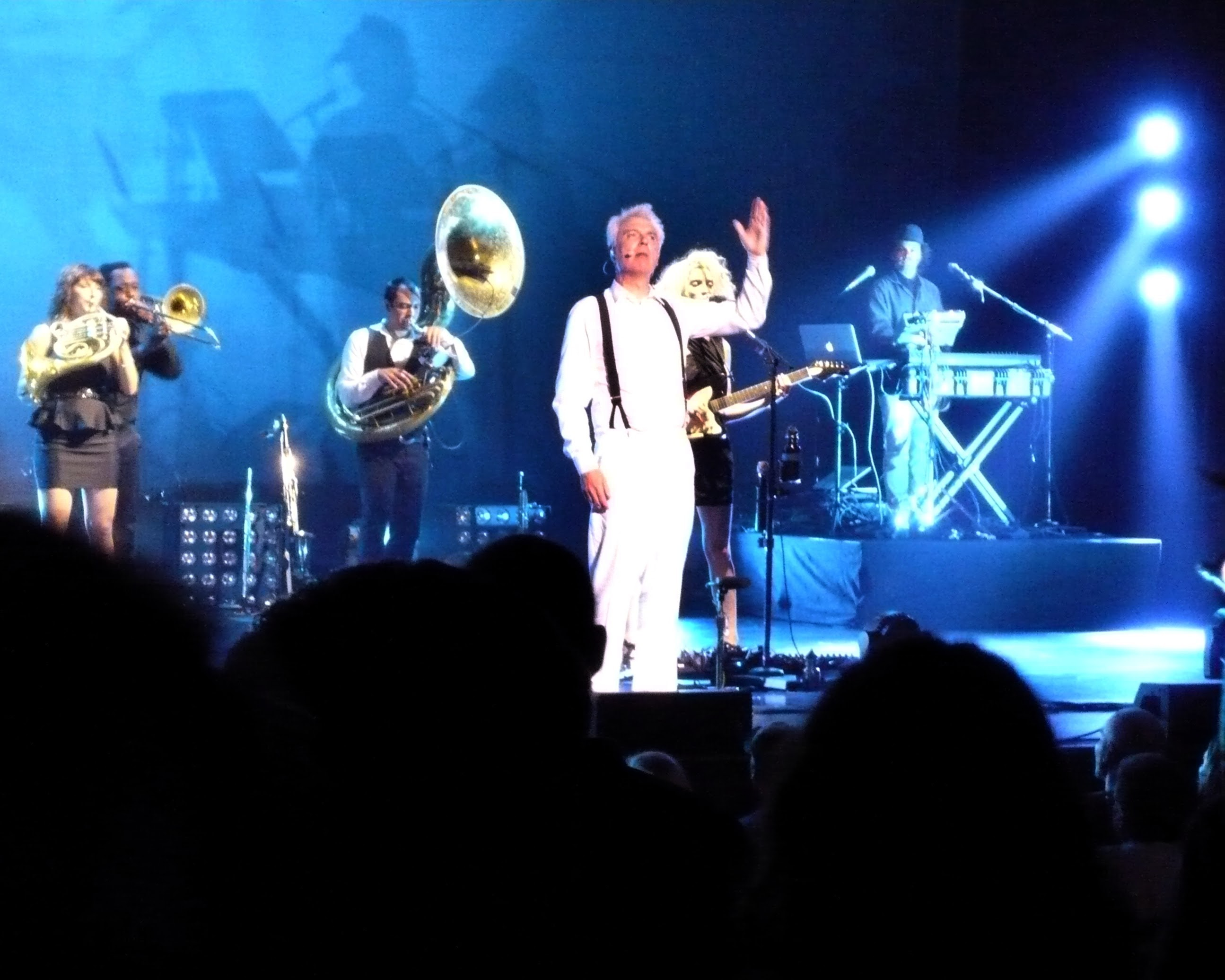
David Byrne and St. Vincent performing in Cincinnati on July 10, 2013

List of 2012 concerts
Date (2012)	City	Country	Venue
15 September	Minneapolis	United States	State Theatre
16 September	Milwaukee	United States	Riverside Theater
18 September	Chicago	United States	Chicago Theatre
20 September	Toronto	Canada	Queen Elizabeth Theatre
21 September (Note: The performance in Montreal on 21 September 2012 was part of the POP Montreal Music Festival.)	Montreal	Canada	Saint-Jean-Baptiste Church
23 September	Boston	United States	Orpheum Theatre
25 September	New York City	United States	Beacon Theatre
26 September	New York City	United States	Beacon Theatre
27 September	Upper Darby	United States	Tower Theater
29 September	New York City	United States	Williamsburg Park
30 September	North Bethesda	United States	The Music Center at Strathmore
2 October	Nashville	United States	Ryman Auditorium
3 October	Atlanta	United States	Cobb Energy Performing Arts Centre
5 October	Austin	United States	Bass Concert Hall
6 October	Houston	United States	Hobby Center for the Performing Arts
7 October	Dallas	United States	McFarlin Memorial Auditorium
10 October	San Diego	United States	Humphrey’s Concerts by the Bay
11 October	Santa Barbara	United States	Arlington Theater
12 October	Costa Mesa	United States	Segerstrom Center for the Arts
13 October	Los Angeles	United States	Greek Theatre
15 October	San Francisco	United States	Orpheum Theatre
17 October (Note: The performance in Seattle on 17 October 2012 was part of the 2012 Heineken CityArts Fest.)	Seattle	United States	5th Avenue Theatre
18 October	Portland	United States	Arlene Schnitzer Concert Hall
20 October	Vancouver	Canada	The Centre For Performing Arts

List of 2013 concerts
Date (2013)	City	Country	Venue
14 January	Melbourne	Australia	Arts Centre Melbourne
15 January	Melbourne	Australia	Arts Centre Melbourne
17 January (Note: The performances in Sydney on 17 and 18 January 2013 were part of the Sydney Festival.)	Sydney	Australia	State Theatre
18 January	Sydney	Australia	State Theatre
20 January (Note: The performance in Hobart on 20 January 2013 was part of the MONA FOMA Festival.)	Hobart	Australia	Princes Wharf, Shed No. 1
12 June	Montclair	United States	Wellmont Theater
13 June	Baltimore	United States	Joseph Meyerhoff Symphony Hall
15 June	Asheville	United States	Thomas Wolfe Auditorium
16 June (Note: The performance in Manchester on 16 June 2013 was part of the Bonnaroo Music and Arts Festival.)	Manchester	United States	Great Stage Park
18 June	Charlotte	United States	Belk Theater
20 June	New Haven	United States	Shubert Theatre
21 June	Portland	United States	State Theatre
22 June	Shelburne	United States	The Green at Shelburne Museum
23 June (Note: The performance in Ottawa on 23 June 2013 was part of the Ottawa Jazz Festival.)	Ottawa	Canada	Confederation Park
25 June (Note: The performance in Rochester on 25 June 2013 was part of the Rochester International Jazz Festival.)	Rochester	United States	Kodak Hall
27 June	New Bedford	United States	The Zeiterion Performing Arts Center
28 June	Red Bank	United States	Count Basie Theatre
29 June	Port Chester	United States	Capitol Theatre
30 June	Greenburg	United States	Palace Theatre
2 July	Louisville	United States	Robert S. Whitney Hall
5 July (Note: The performance in Des Moines on 5 July 2013 was part of the 80/35 Music Festival.)	Des Moines	United States	Western Gateway Park
6 July (Note: The performance in Highland Park on 6 July 2013 was part of the Ravinia Festival.)	Highland Park	United States	The Pavilion
7 July	Grand Rapids	United States	Meijer Gardens
8 July	Ann Arbor	United States	Michigan Theater
10 July	Cincinnati	United States	Taft Theatre
12 July	Kansas City	United States	Crossroads at Grinder's Park
13 July	Denver	United States	Denver Botanic Gardens
14 July (Note: The performance in Telluride on 14 July 2013 was part of the Ride Festival.)	Telluride	United States	Town Park
15 July	Salt Lake City	United States	Red Butte Garden Amphitheatre
17 July	Eugene	United States	The Cuthbert Amphitheater
18 July	Woodinville	United States	Chateau Ste. Michelle Winery
20 July	Saratoga	United States	Mountain Winery
21 July	Oakland	United States	Fox Oakland Theatre
18 August	Reykjavík	Iceland	Harpa
20 August	Oslo	Norway	Folketeateret
21 August	Stockholm	Sweden	Filadelfiakyrkan
22 August	Copenhagen	Denmark	Falconersalen
24 August	Brussels	Belgium	Centre for Fine Arts
25 August	Utrecht	Netherlands	Muziekcentrum Vredenburg
27 August	London	England	Roundhouse
28 August	Birmingham	England	Symphony Hall
29 August	Glasgow	Scotland	Glasgow Royal Concert Hall
30 August (Note: The performance in Salisbury on 30 August 2013 was part of the End of the Road Festival.)	Salisbury	England	Larmer Tree Gardens
1 September (Note: The performance in Stradbally on 1 September 2013 was part of the Electric Picnic Festival.)	Stradbally	Ireland	Stradbally Hall
6 September	Madrid	Spain	Teatro Circo Price
7 September	Barcelona	Spain	L'Auditori
9 September	Gardone Riviera	Italy	Vittoriale degli Italiani
10 September	Padua	Italy	Gran Teatro Geox
11 September	Rome	Italy	Parco della Musica
12 September	Florence	Italy	Teatro Verdi

=== Cancelled shows ===
List of cancelled concerts
Date	City	Country	Venue	Reason
11 June 2013	Montclair	United States	Wellmont Theater	Scheduling conflicts.
3 September 2013	Lisbon	Portugal	Coliseu dos Recreios	Cancelled by promoter due economic difficulties.
4 September 2013	Porto	Portugal	Coliseu do Porto	Cancelled by promoter due economic difficulties.

== Personnel ==
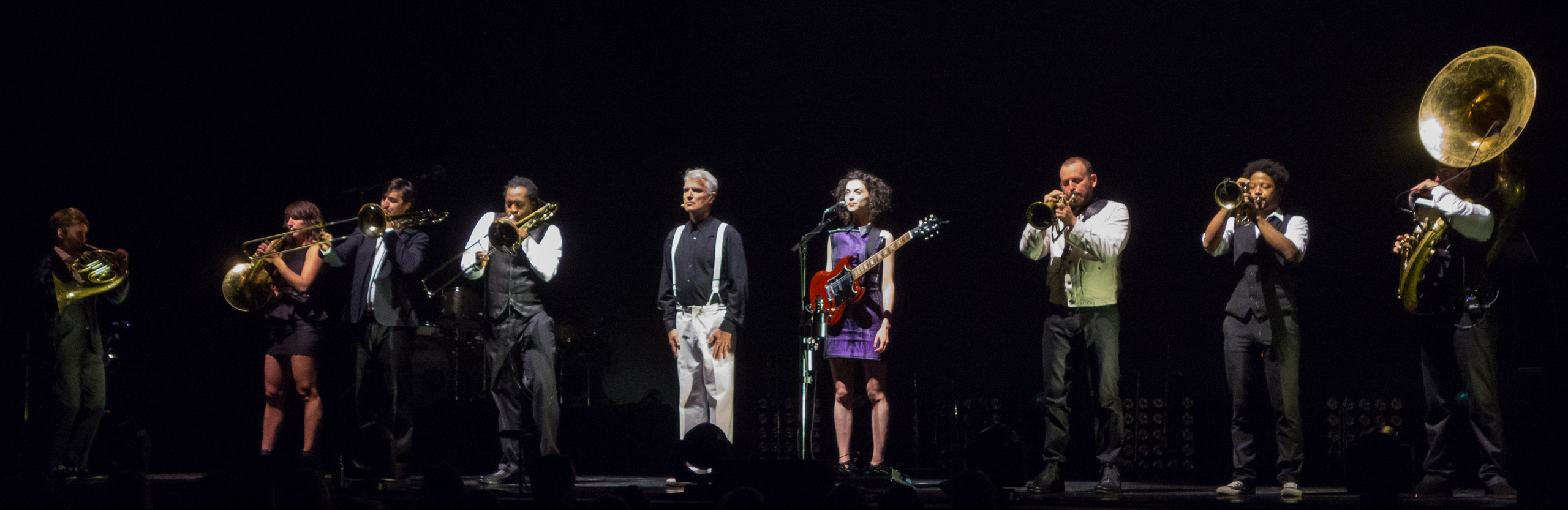
The performers and their band engaged in complex choreography through the show. Pictured, David Byrne and St. Vincent performing in Seattle in October 2012.

Credits adapted from the NPR website.

Band

- David Byrne – Vocals, Guitar, Natural Trumpet, Theremin
- St. Vincent – Vocals, Guitar, Electronic Drums, Theremin
- Daniel Mintseris – Keyboards, Musical Director
- Brian Wolfe – Drums
- Kelly Pratt – Trumpet, Flugelhorn, French Horn, Flute
- Dave Nelson – Trombone
- Jon Natchez – Clarinet, Flute, Saxophone
- Bryan Murray – Clarinet, Flute, Saxophone
- Rachel Drehmann – French Horn
- Jason Disu – Trombone
- John Altieri – Sousaphone, Tuba
- Carter Yasutake – Trumpet, Flugelhorn

Choreographers

- Annie-B Parson – Choreographer
