= Is Paris Burning? =

Is Paris Burning? (German: Brennt Paris?) was a demand said to have been directed by Adolf Hitler at his military governor of Paris, General Dietrich von Choltitz, or in another account at Hitler's chief of staff, General Alfred Jodl, in August 1944 as Paris was falling to the Allies.

The phrase can refer to:

- Is Paris Burning? (book), a 1965 history of the Liberation of Paris by Collins and Lapierre
- Is Paris Burning? (film), a 1966 French dramatization of the book directed by René Clément

== See also ==
- Sakura Wars 3: Is Paris Burning?
- Paris Is Burning (disambiguation)
