= Love This Giant =

2012 studio album by David Byrne and St. Vincent

Studio album by David Byrne and St. Vincent
- Released: September 10, 2012
- Recorded: Late 2009 – 2012
- Studios: Water Music Studio, Hoboken (brass); Patrick Dillett's Studio, New York City (additional elements)
- Genre: Art pop
- Length: 44:33
- Labels: 4AD; Todo Mundo
- Producers: David Byrne; Annie Clark; Patrick Dillett (co-production); John Congleton (co.)

David Byrne chronology
Live at Carnegie Hall (2012)	Love This Giant (2012)	Brass Tactics (2013)

St. Vincent chronology
4AD Session (2012)	Love This Giant (2012)	Brass Tactics (2013)

Singles from Love This Giant
- 1. "Who" Released: June 14, 2012 (promo); 2. "I Should Watch TV" Released: November 19, 2012

Love This Giant is a studio album made in collaboration between American musicians David Byrne and St. Vincent (Annie Clark), released on 4AD and Todo Mundo on September 10, 2012, in the United Kingdom and the following day in the United States. Marking Byrne's ninth studio album overall and Clark's fourth, Byrne and Clark began working together in late 2009, using a writing and promotion process that Byrne had previously used on his 2008 collaboration with Brian Eno Everything That Happens Will Happen Today. The duo had previously played together live at an Actor Tour concert, and on the album Here Lies Love. The performers enlisted a variety of brass musicians to augment their songwriting and toured over the following year to promote the album.

David Byrne incorporated a reworked performance of "I Should Watch TV" in his American Utopia Tour, and later in its Broadway production, documented in the film of the same name.

== Composition, recording, and production ==
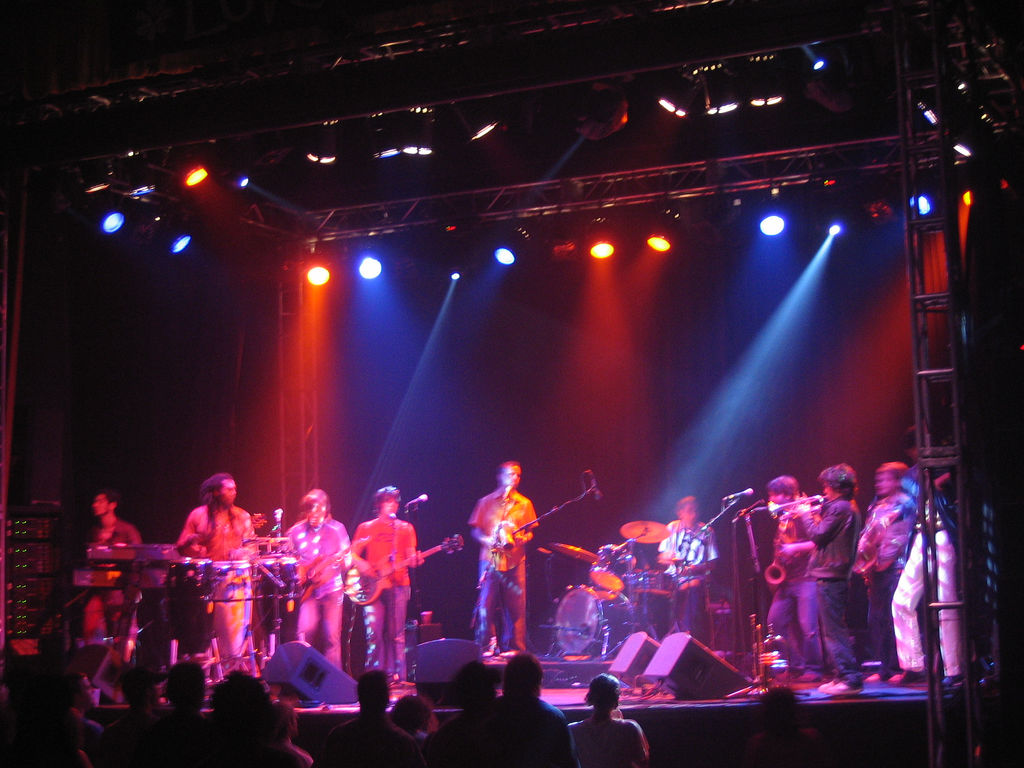
Antibalas Afrobeat Orchestra is one of several guests on the album, augmenting the songs with their horn sections.

The two artists met in 2009 at a Radio City Music Hall benefit concert for the AIDS/HIV charity Dark Was the Night. However, the collaboration stemmed from a second meeting, at New York thrift shop Housing Works, where Björk and Dirty Projectors were performing. A concert organizer suggested Byrne and Clark try a similar collaboration. Their work was initially slated just for a single live performance, but Clark suggested adding brass to their line-up and the two realized they could write original music around horns.

"I suggested brass as a prominent voice because, at the time David and I decided to write songs together, I had just done the Actor record with a lot of woodwind and a lot of strings on it. So I hadn't explored brass and I wanted to. Originally, we were going to do a night of music at a bookstore for charity. So I was thinking, Okay, it could be a small ensemble: just me and David and a couple of guitars and we'll call it a day. But then obviously it grew and grew and grew. Brass was a way to bridge what we do in some sort of neutral, middle ground. When we toured the album, just the sheer number of people onstage was exciting and overwhelming, and these people organised the stage movement in really fun and idiosyncratic ways and it made for such a lighthearted, beguiling show." – Annie Clark

The musicians composed lyrics in person and via e-mail, which resulted in an entire album's worth of material. Byrne and Clark each wrote and sing their own lyrics, with the exception of "The Forest Awakes"—which Byrne wrote, but Clark sings. The instrumentation and funk grooves discouraged Byrne from writing his typical personal lyrics to writing about larger themes and Clark emphasized the art music nature of the recordings while composing.

The album cover was inspired by Beauty and the Beast, with Byrne as a "Buzz Lightyear-like" beauty and Clark as a grotesque beast. The duo originally intended a plastic beauty and feral beast as a joke about the age difference between the two, but altered their idea when they met the prosthetics designer.

== Promotion ==
David Byrne and St. Vincent worked with digital promotions company Topspin Media to distribute the promotional single "Who" and create embeddable widgets to stream the album. A music video directed by Martin du Thurah was released on September 4 for "Who". Jon Dolan of Rolling Stone gave the song three and a half out of five stars, calling the collaborators' chemistry "shocking". In reviewing the track, WNYC's John Schaefer drew parallels between their use of brass instruments and Byrne's previous work on The Knee Plays. On July 30, the track "Weekend in the Dust" became available for streaming on the album's official website. On September 2, the full album became available for streaming via NPR.

Byrne and Clark appeared on the September issue of Filter and performed on the September 10 episode of Late Night with Jimmy Fallon. On November 1, 2012, the duo performed on The Colbert Report.

The duo embarked on the Love This Giant Tour to promote the album between September 2012 and September 2013, with a backing band that includes eight brass players (led by Kelly Pratt of Bright Moments), St. Vincent's keyboardist Daniel Mintseris, and My Brightest Diamond's drummer Brian Wolfe. Like Byrne's previous Songs of David Byrne and Brian Eno Tour, the performers engaged in complex choreography onstage while performing. Byrne also simultaneously did book readings to promote his book How Music Works.

=== Brass Tactics ===
Brass Tactics

EP by David Byrne and St. Vincent
- Released: May 28, 2013
- Length: 18:11
- Labels: 4AD; Todo Mundo

David Byrne chronology
Love This Giant (2012)	Brass Tactics (2013)	American Utopia (2018)

St. Vincent chronology
Love This Giant (2012)	Brass Tactics (2013)	St. Vincent (2014)

Brass Tactics is a promotional EP that was released via Topspin's platform on May 28, 2013. Contains a new song, remixes from Love This Giant and live recordings from the Love This Giant Tour.

1. "Cissus" (previously unreleased album track) – 3:14
2. "I Should Watch TV" (M. Stine remix) – 3:32
3. "Lightning" (Kent Rockafeller remix) – 3:12
4. "Marrow" (live) – 3:46
5. "Road to Nowhere" (live) – 4:27

== Reception ==
=== Critical reception ===
Professional ratings
Aggregate scores
Source	Rating
AnyDecentMusic?	7.5/10
Metacritic	77/100
Review scores
Source	Rating
AllMusic	4.5/5 stars
The A.V. Club	B+
The Guardian	4/5 stars
The Independent	4/5 stars
NME	9/10
The Observer	4/5 stars
Pitchfork	5.9/10
Q	4/5 stars
Rolling Stone	3/5 stars
Spin	6/10

Love This Giant has received generally positive reviews; aggregator Metacritic scores it a 77 with 36 reviews, indicating "Generally favorable reviews". Reviewing the album, BBC Music's Jude Clarke calls it "a perfect cerebral pop pairing" that "improves and deepens on each listen" due to the songwriting and the singers' voices. Bram E. Gieben of The Skinny also praised the "engaging musical conversation" between the two singers, but criticized the musicianship for lacking experimentation and Heather Phares of AllMusic agrees that the album is lacking in Clark's "guitar acrobatics". The Guardian's Maddy Costa has praised the vocals as well, contrasting them from subtle and seductive to "soft and whispy... with the glint of a razor blade."

The Independent's Andy Gill and Simmy Richman consider the brass instrumentation the greatest strength of the album with the latter declaring the work "a skewed and funky instant classic". Robert Leedham of Drowned in Sound praised the "jaunty trombones" and "jubilant trumpet-lead fanfare" as well, but found the alternating vocals weak and Byrne-centric.

=== Commercial reception ===
In 2012 it was awarded a silver certification from the Independent Music Companies Association, which indicated sales of at least 20,000 copies throughout Europe. The album was Byrne's first solo effort to reach the Billboard Top 40, peaking at 23; this was subsequently surpassed by 2018's American Utopia, which debuted at No. 3.

== Track listing ==
All songs written by David Byrne and Annie Clark, except where noted

1. "Who" – 3:50
2. "Weekend in the Dust" – 3:05
3. "Dinner for Two" – 3:43
4. "Ice Age" (Clark) – 3:13
5. "I Am an Ape" – 3:05
6. "The Forest Awakes" (Byrne, Clark, and Walt Whitman) – 4:52
7. "I Should Watch TV" – 3:08
8. "Lazarus" – 3:13
9. "Optimist" – 3:49
10. "Lightning" – 4:15
11. "The One Who Broke Your Heart" – 3:46
12. "Outside of Space and Time" (Byrne) – 4:34

== Personnel ==
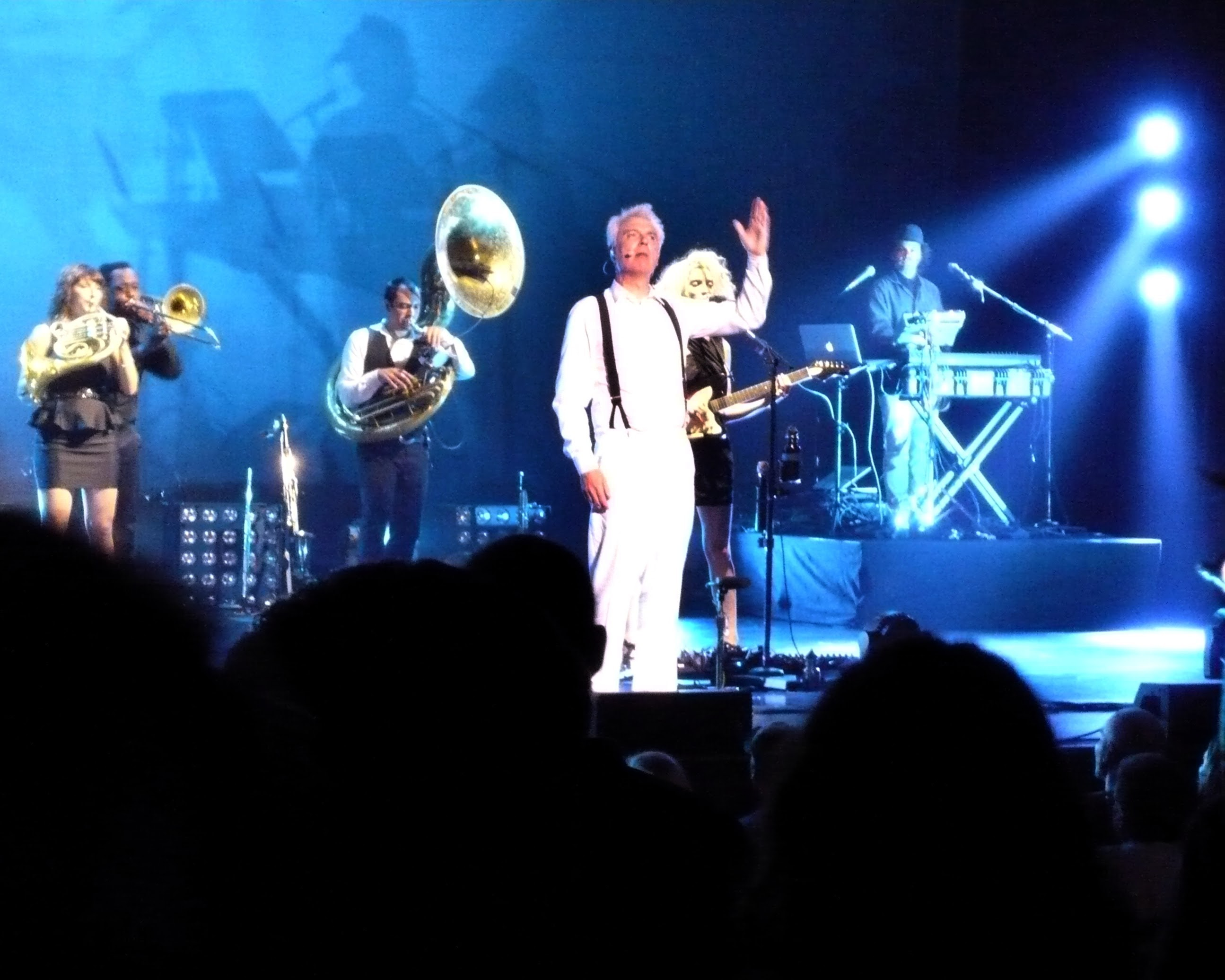
Byrne and St. Vincent performing in Cincinnati, Ohio on July 10, 2013

- David Byrne – guitar, vocals, production; percussion programming on "The Forest Awakes" and "The One Who Broke Your Heart"; Omnichord on "Optimist"
- St. Vincent – guitar, vocals, production; synth bass on "Ice Age", "I Am an Ape", "I Should Watch TV", and "Lightning"; piano on "Dinner for Two"

Additional musicians

- Jacquelyn Adams – French horn on "Who", "Ice Age", "I Am an Ape", "I Should Watch TV", and "Out of Space and Time"
- Randy Andos – tuba on "Weekend in the Dust"
- Antibalas Afrobeat Orchestra – "The One Who Broke Your Heart"
  - Stuart D. Bogie – saxophone
  - Jordan McLean – trumpet
  - Martín Perna – saxophone
- Jack Bashkow – saxophone on "Who", "Dinner for Two", "Ice Age", "I Am an Ape", "The Forest Awakes", "I Should Watch TV", "Lazarus", and "Lightning"; clarinet on "Optimist"
- Lawrence Di Bello – French horn on "The Forest Awakes"
- Ravi Best – trumpet on "Weekend in the Dust"
- Ron Blake – saxophone on "Weekend in the Dust"
- Jeff Caswell – bass trombone on "Ice Age", "I Am an Ape", "The Forest Awakes", "I Should Watch TV", "Lazarus", "Optimist", "Lightning", and "Outside of Space and Time"
- John Congleton – production, drum programming; synth on "I Should Watch TV"
- The Dap-Kings – "The One Who Broke Your Heart"
  - Cochemea Gastelum – saxophone
  - David Guy – trumpet
- Eric Davis – French horn on "Who", "Dinner for Two", "Ice Age", "I Am an Ape", "I Should Watch TV", "Lazarus", "Optimist", "Lightning", and "Outside of Space and Time"
- Dominic Derasse – trumpet on "Dinner for Two", "The Forest Awakes", and "Lazarus"
- Rachel Drehmann – French horn on "The Forest Awakes" and "Lazarus"
- Steve Elson – saxophone on "Who", "Weekend in the Dust", "Dinner for Two", "Ice Age", "I Am an Ape", "The Forest Awakes", "I Should Watch TV", "Lazarus", "Optimist", and "Lightning"
- Kenneth Finn – euphonium on "Dinner for Two"; trombone on "I Am an Ape", "The Forest Awakes", "I Should Watch TV", "Lazarus", "Optimist", and "Lightning"
- Gareth Flowers – trumpet on "Dinner for Two", "Ice Age", "I Am an Ape", "The Forest Awakes", "I Should Watch TV", "Lazarus", "Optimist", "Lightning", and "Outside of Space and Time"
- Alex Foster – saxophone on "Weekend in the Dust"
- Josh Frank – trumpet on "Ice Age", "I Am an Ape", "I Should Watch TV", and "Lighting"; trumpet and flugelhorn on "Outside of Space and Time"
- Paul Frazier – bass guitar on "Who" and "Outside of Space and Time"
- Earl Gardner – trumpet on "Weekend in the Dust"
- Mike Gurfield – trumpet on "Dinner for Two", "Ice Age", "I Am an Ape", "The Forest Awakes", "I Should Watch TV", "Lazarus", "Optimist", "Lightning", and "Outside of Space and Time"
- Stan Harrison – saxophone on "Weekend in the Dust"
- Ian Hendrickson-Smith – saxophone on "The One Who Broke Your Heart"
- Tom Hutchinson – euphonium on "Dinner for Two"
- Aaron Johnson – trombone on "The One Who Broke Your Heart"
- Ryan Keberle – trombone on "Weekend in the Dust"
- R. J. Kelly – French horn on "Dinner for Two", "Lazarus", and "Optimist"
- Chris Komer – French horn on "Who", "Dinner for Two", "Ice Age", "I Am an Ape", "I Should Watch TV", "Optimist", and "Lightning"
- Anthony LaMarca – drums on "Who"
- William Lang – trombone on "Dinner for Two" and "The Forest Awakes"
- Bob Magnuson – saxophone on "The Forest Awakes"
- Brian Mahany – trombone on "Dinner for Two", "Ice Age", "I Am an Ape", "I Should Watch TV", "Lazarus", "Optimist", and "Lightning"
- Ozzie Melendez – trombone on "Weekend in the Dust"
- Patrick Milando – French horn on "The Forest Awakes"
- Lenny Pickett – saxophone and brass arrangement on "Weekend in the Dust"
- Jonathan Powell – trumpet on "Weekend in the Dust"
- Kelly Pratt – trumpet on "Dinner for Two" and "Optimist"; brass arrangement on "Dinner for Two"
- Mauro Refosco – snare drum on "The Forest Awakes", timpani on "I Should Watch TV", surdo on "Optimist"
- Marcus Rojas – tuba on "Weekend in the Dust", "Ice Age", "I Should Watch TV", "Lazarus", "Lightning", and "Outside of Space and Time"
- Mike Seltzer – trombone on "Ice Age"
- Evan Smith – clarinet and flute on "Who" and "I Am an Ape"
- Bob Stewart – tuba on "The One Who Broke Your Heart"
- Tom Timko – saxophone on "Who", "Dinner for Two", "Ice Age", "I Am an Ape", "I Should Watch TV", "Lazarus", "Optimist", and "Lightning"
- Kyle Turner – tuba on "Dinner for Two" and "The Forest Awakes"
- Steve Turre – trombone on "Weekend in the Dust"
- Michael Williams – trombone on "The One Who Broke Your Heart"

Technical

- Jon Altschuler – engineering
- Greg Calbi – mastering at Sterling Sound, New York City
- Patrick Dillett – production, mixing, drum programming
- Tony Finno – brass arrangements
- Ken Thompson – brass arrangements on "The Forest Awakes" with Tony Finno
- Yuki Takahashi – engineering

Design

- Gabe Bartalos – prosthetics
- Richard Burbridge – cover photo
- Catalina Kulczar – art
- Juan Marin – art
- Steve Powers – type design
- LeeAnn Rossi – art
- Noah Wall – package design and art

== See also ==
- 2012 in American music
- Everything That Happens Will Happen Today (2008)
- Here Lies Love (2010)
- 2012 in music
