= All Born Screaming =

2024 album by St. Vincent

Studio album by St. Vincent
- Released: April 26, 2024
- Studios: Compound Fracture (Los Angeles); Studio City Sound (Los Angeles); Valentine (Los Angeles); Chez JMJ (Los Angeles); Electric Lady (New York City); Electrical Audio (Chicago)
- Genres: Art rock; progressive rock; art pop; industrial rock
- Length: 41:14
- Labels: Total Pleasure; Virgin
- Producer: St. Vincent

St. Vincent chronology
The Nowhere Inn (2021)	All Born Screaming (2024)	Todos Nacen Gritando (2024)

Singles from All Born Screaming
- 1. "Broken Man" Released: February 29, 2024; 2. "Flea" Released: March 28, 2024; 3. "Big Time Nothing" Released: April 23, 2024

All Born Screaming is the seventh studio album by American rock musician St. Vincent, released on April 26, 2024, through her own Total Pleasure Records and distributed via Virgin Music Group. The album was self-produced and features musical contributions from several notable artists. It was preceded by three singles: "Broken Man", "Flea" and "Big Time Nothing".

The album won three of its four nominations at the 67th Annual Grammy Awards: Best Alternative Music Album, Best Rock Song for "Broken Man", and Best Alternative Music Performance for "Flea". A Spanish re-recording of the album, titled Todos Nacen Gritando, was released on November 15, 2024, followed by a special Japanese edition with live bonus tracks.

The album debuted at number 86 on the US Billboard 200 selling 10,000 pure album sales in its first week.

== Background and promotion ==
On February 16, 2024, Clark first spoke about the record, saying how she "needed to go deeper in finding [her] own sonic vocabulary" and referring to the album as "post-plague pop". All Born Screaming marks the first studio album entirely produced by Clark herself, alongside mixing by Cian Riordan. The record features contributions from Dave Grohl and Josh Freese of Foo Fighters, Cate Le Bon, Justin Meldal-Johnsen, Stella Mozgawa of Warpaint, Rachel Eckroth, Mark Guiliana, and David Ralicke of Dengue Fever. Trying to explain the sound of the album, Clark compared it to "taking the long walk into the woods alone" in order to find the messages of your heart. As a result, she opined that it "sounds real because it is real".

Clark shared the lead single "Broken Man", an "industrial menacing rock" piece, on February 29, 2024, along with a music video directed by Alex Da Corte. During the video, she bursts into flames, an image that is also depicted as the album artwork. A second single, "Flea", was released on March 28, the same day the All Born Screaming Tour was officially announced. A Japanese edition, with live bonus tracks, was announced to be released on December 25, 2024.

== Writing and recording ==
As soon as St Vincent's previous studio album, Daddy's Home (2021), was released, Clark immediately began writing for its follow-up. Clark began experimenting with drum machines and modular synthesizers where she said she ended up making "hours and hours of esoteric post-industrial dance music" on her own. During this experimentation period, Clark got into microdosing on psychedelic drugs.

All Born Screaming was recorded at six studios in three cities, including Clark's own Compound Fracture studio in Los Angeles, Electric Lady Studios in New York and Electrical Audio in Chicago. It is her first self-produced album. Clark felt a need to self-produce the album as there "were sounds in my head that, really, only I could render" and wanting to be seen as a singular artist with greater control over her own work. Paste described All Born Screaming as "career-spanning time capsule harboring the flourishes of her greatest eras" that incorporates elements of lounge, noise rock, baroque, funk, chamber pop and electronica.

Regarding the album's title, Clark noted: "We're all born in some ways against our will. But at the same time, if you're born screaming, it's a great sign – it's a sign you're alive. We're all born in protest, so screaming is what it means to be alive". Clark elaborated: "I've known I was going to make a record called All Born Screaming since I was 23, but I just wasn't ready. I wasn't really worthy of the title, 'cause you have to live a lot to be worthy of a title that really says it all. It's the beauty, it's the brutality, and it's all part of the same continuum".

"Big Time Nothing" is a synth and bass-driven funky dance-pop track that Clark says reminds her of the "early '90s London … The Prodigy, sort of, like, rave moment". The track's verse, which is delivered in a spoken-word style, came from Clark's own "constant inner monologue of depression and anxiety". The track "Sweetest Fruit" includes an ode to the late music producer Sophie, who died in 2021 after a fall that’s quoted in “Sweetest Fruit”, and whom Clark admired, and is about "people trying for transcendence, and at least they were taking a big swing or trying for something beautiful". The artist admitted recording over a hundred vocal takes for "Hell is Near": "That was a song that if I didn’t bow before it, it just wouldn’t happen. I sang it 100 times. The chorus is bare … and I have to actually be there to sing it and for it to be real and not throw a bunch of ego or bullshit".

== Critical reception ==
Professional ratings
Aggregate scores
Source	Rating
AnyDecentMusic?	8.1/10
Metacritic	89/100
Review scores
Source	Rating
AllMusic	4.5/5 stars
Clash	9/10
Financial Times	4/5 stars
The Guardian	5/5 stars
The Independent	4/5 stars
The Line of Best Fit	8/10
NME	4/5 stars
Pitchfork	7.8/10
Rolling Stone	4/5 stars
The Skinny	4/5 stars

All Born Screaming received a score of 89 out of 100 on review aggregator Metacritic based on 23 critics' reviews, which the website categorized as "universal acclaim".

In a five-star review, Alexis Petridis of The Guardian praised Clark's "beautifully honed skill as a songwriter" and the "personality she imprints across the album". Petridis highlights how Clark takes inspiration from the music of her youth such as Tori Amos and Nine Inch Nails while adding her own unique ideas to avoid swerving into "90s revivialism". The Independent in their four-star review praised the album's runtime and cohesion as a "tight and digestible affair" with Clark allowing herself "a bit of indulgence" on the seven-minute album closing track that builds over time.

Some reviews noted how All Born Screaming departs from the 1970s rock of Clark's previous studio album, Daddy's Home. iNews called it a "striking departure" with praise for the album's lyrical themes that draw on "experiences of death and loss, and references to mortality abound". Similarly, the Financial Times commended Clark's ability to undergo a Bowie-esque reinvention with a "rebirth" that focusses less on taking on a persona and more on writing songs that cut "very close to the bone".

Shaad D'Souza of Pitchfork felt that the two singles that preceded the album, "Flea" and "Broken Man", do not accurately represent the album's "sensitive and introspective" moments. The Line of Best Fit concurred with this sentiment. D'Souza called All Born Screaming Clark's "most hopeful record to date". Jordan Bassett, in a four-star review for NME, praised the vulnerability displayed by Clark with lyrics "besieged by loss", making the album her "most generous and open statement yet".

The album won three of its four nominations at the 67th Annual Grammy Awards: Best Alternative Music Album, Best Rock Song for "Broken Man", and Best Alternative Music Performance for "Flea".

=== Year-end lists ===
Select year-end rankings for All Born Screaming
Publication/critic	Accolade	Rank	Ref.
MOJO	The Best Albums Of 2024	25	
Rough Trade UK	Albums of the Year 2024	15	
Rolling Stone	The Best 100 Albums of 2024	49	

== Track listing ==
All tracks are written by Annie Clark, except "Big Time Nothing" (Clark, Cate Le Bon).

All Born Screaming – Standard edition
No.	Title	Length
1.	"Hell Is Near"	4:09
2.	"Reckless"	3:57
3.	"Broken Man"	3:21
4.	"Flea"	3:47
5.	"Big Time Nothing"	2:59
6.	"Violent Times"	3:57
7.	"The Power's Out"	4:38
8.	"Sweetest Fruit"	3:56
9.	"So Many Planets"	3:35
10.	"All Born Screaming" (featuring Cate Le Bon)	6:55
Total length:		41:14

All Born Screaming – Japanese bonus tracks edition
No.	Title	Length
11.	"Flea" (Live from EastWest Studios)	3:58
12.	"Big Time Nothing" (Live from EastWest Studios)	2:55
Total length:		48:07

== Personnel ==
Credits adapted from the Japanese release's liner notes.

- Annie Clark – vocals, production (all tracks); engineering (tracks 1–10), bass (1, 4, 5, 7), Hydrasynth (1, 9); 12-string guitar, acoustic guitar, Synthi, electric piano (1); drum programming (2–10), synthesizers (2, 3, 5–8, 10), guitars (3–12), modular synthesizer (3, 5, 6), organ (4), horn arrangement (5), Bass VI (6), electric bass (8), theremin (9)
- Justin Meldal-Johnsen – engineering (1–10), electric bass (1, 2); Synthi, Hydrasynth (1); additional production (2, 9, 10); guitar, drum programming (2, 10); upright bass, tape machines (2); bass (3, 4, 6, 8–10), background vocals (4), Bass VI (6), percussion (7), synthesizers (9, 10); Perkons, effects (9); tambourine (10)
- Cian Riordan – engineering, mixing (all tracks); drums (3, 5), synth bass (6–8)
- Ruairi O'Flaherty – mastering (1–10)
- Jack Kennedy – mastering (11, 12)
- Rachel Eckroth – acoustic piano (1), Casiotone (2, 9); piano, B3 organ (2); keyboards, vocals (12)
- Josh Freese – drums (1)
- Dave Grohl – drums (3, 4)
- David Ralicke – saxophones (3), horns (5, 6, 8)
- Mark Guiliana – drums (3, 6, 12)
- Cate Le Bon – additional production (5, 7, 8, 10), bass (7, 10), background vocals (10)
- Stella Mozgawa – drums (10)
- Jason Falkner – guitars, vocals (12)
- Charlotte Kemp Muhl – bass, vocals (12)
- Alex Da Corte – creative direction

== Charts ==
Chart performance for All Born Screaming
Chart (2024)	Peak position
Australian Albums (ARIA)	81
Austrian Albums (Ö3 Austria)	18
Belgian Albums (Ultratop Flanders)	20
Belgian Albums (Ultratop Wallonia)	102
Croatian International Albums (HDU)	14
Dutch Albums (Album Top 100)	81
German Albums (Offizielle Top 100)	34
Greek Albums (IFPI)	66
Irish Albums (IRMA)	56
Scottish Albums (Official Charts)	3
Spanish Albums (Promusicae)	49
Swiss Albums (Schweizer Hitparade)	21
UK Albums (Official Charts)	5
US Billboard 200	86
US Independent Albums (Billboard)	13
US Top Rock & Alternative Albums (Billboard)	21

== Todos Nacen Gritando ==
Todos Nacen Gritando

Remix album by St. Vincent
- Released: November 15, 2024
- Length: 41:10
- Language: Spanish
- Label: Total Pleasure
- Producer: St. Vincent

St. Vincent chronology
All Born Screaming (2024)	Todos Nacen Gritando (2024)	Live in London! (2026)

Singles from Todos Nacen Gritando
- 1. "Hombre Roto" Released: September 20, 2024; 2. "Pulga" Released: October 11, 2024; 3. "El Mero Cero" Released: November 12, 2024

Todos Nacen Gritando is a Spanish-language version of All Born Screaming, released on November 15, 2024. It is Clark's first Spanish language project, saying she wanted to "offer a little thanks to Spanish-language fans who have met me in my native tongue for seven records". Clark enlisted her friend Alan Del Rio Ortiz to help with translating the album's lyrics. The spanish versions of all All Born Screaming singles were released in the same order, with the first single, "Hombre Roto", released on September 20.

=== Track listing ===
All tracks are written by Annie Clark, except where noted.

Todos Nacen Gritando – Standard edition
No.	Title	Length
1.	"El Infierno Está Cerca"	4:08
2.	"Salvaje"	3:57
3.	"Hombre Roto"	3:21
4.	"Pulga"	3:46
5.	"El Mero Cero"	2:58
6.	"Tiempos Violentos"	3:57
7.	"Se Fue La Luz"	4:38
8.	"La Fruta Más Dulce"	3:55
9.	"Tantos Planetas"	3:35
10.	"Todos Nacen Gritando" (featuring Cate Le Bon; Annie Clark, Cate Le Bon)	6:55
Total length:		41:10
