= Pay Your Way in Pain =

2021 single by St. Vincent

Single by St. Vincent

from the album Daddy's Home
- Released: March 4, 2021
- Studio: Electric Lady Studios
- Genre: Funk
- Length: 3:04
- Label: Loma Vista; Concord
- Songwriters: Annie Clark; Jack Antonoff
- Producers: Annie Clark; Jack Antonoff

St. Vincent singles chronology
"New York" (2020)	"Pay Your Way in Pain" (2021)	"The Melting of the Sun" (2021)

Music video
- "Pay Your Way in Pain" on YouTube

"Pay Your Way in Pain" is a song recorded by American musician St. Vincent for her sixth studio album, Daddy's Home (2021). The song was written and produced by St. Vincent and Jack Antonoff. It was released on March 4, 2021, as the album's lead single by Loma Vista Recordings and Concord Records. A synth-driven funk song influenced by the 1970s, its lyrics were inspired by the singer's own struggles.

"Pay Your Way in Pain" received generally positive reviews from music critics, some of whom have praised the song's composition and St. Vincent's vocal performance. Several critics have also compared the song to the works of David Bowie and Prince. An accompanying '70s themed music video was directed by Bill Benz and features St. Vincent dancing under flashing disco lights.

== Background and release ==
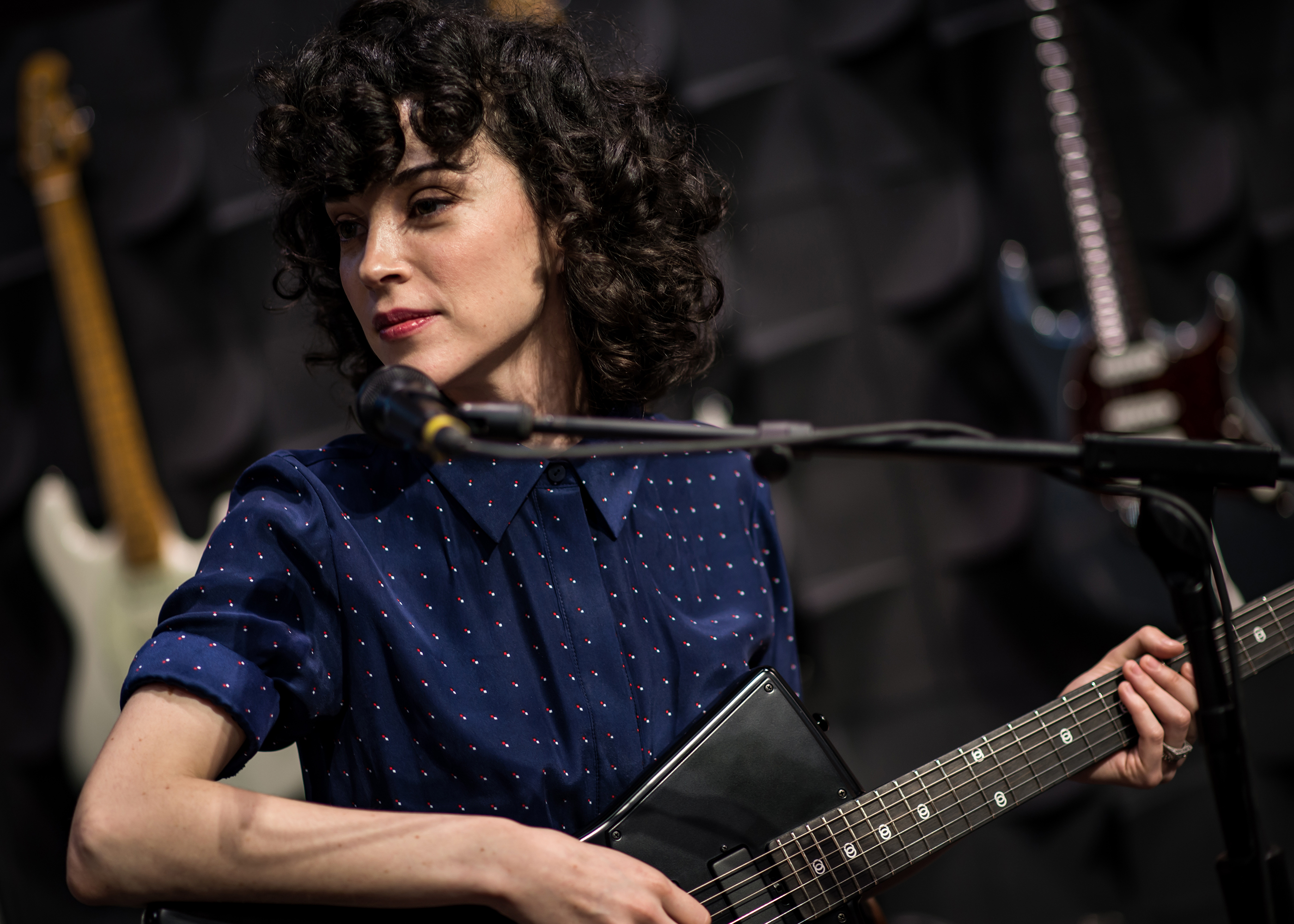
St. Vincent (pictured in 2017) co-wrote and co-produced "Pay Your Way in Pain".

St. Vincent released her fifth studio album Masseduction in October 2017, which was met with "universal acclaim" from music critics and won two awards at the 61st Annual Grammy Awards. She began working on her next album Daddy's Home in 2019, taking inspiration from the sepia-toned downtown New York records from 1971 to 1975. During an interview with NME, St. Vincent said she wanted to create a record that is "all about groove, feel and performance". She explained, "There's something interesting about what the early '70s were, and the parallels between then and now – even socially". For the album, St. Vincent reunited with producer Jack Antonoff, who had worked together with her on Masseduction. The pair recorded songs for Daddy's Home at the Electric Lady Studios, New York City, before the start of the COVID-19 pandemic. The album was announced in February 2021.

The album opener, "Pay Your Way in Pain" has writing and production credits for both Antonoff and St. Vincent; the latter is credited under her birth name Annie Clark. Both of them produced the vocals and played the guitar. Clark played the sitar, and synthesizer; Antonoff played the bass, guitar, organ, and percussion, as well as provided backing vocals for the track alongside Kenya Hathaway and Lynne Fiddmont. Antonoff also played the drums with Cian Riordan. Thomas Bartlett played the piano. Laura Sisk engineered the song, with assistance from John Rooney and Jon Sher. Sian Riordan mixed the track, while mastering was handled by Chris Gehringer. "Pay Your Way in Pain" was released as the lead single from the album on March 4, 2021, by Loma Vista Recordings in association with Concord Records.

== Music and lyrics ==
Clark is known for her indie-rock origins. In comparison, "Pay Your Way in Pain" is a funk track, with a length of three minutes and four seconds. The song is written in the key of A major with a tempo of 125 beats per minute. Alex Suskind of Entertainment Weekly characterised the sound as a blend of '70s glam rock and '80s new wave styles. The production prominently features '70s influences and a synth bassline.

The song opens with a bar-room piano intro before shifting to "squelchy" '80s TB-303 synthesizer tones. Clark sings in "sensual, rhythmic moans" alongside an arrangement of keyboards and guitars. The New York Times music critic Jon Pareles noted the use of harmonising processed vocals, which take the form of gasping as Clark delivers the words "pain" and "shame" in the song's chorus. Rolling Stone's Brenna Ehrlich felt that the song transformed into "bluesy jazz" during the chorus, when Clark is joined by the backing vocalists. This is followed by a call-and-response section where Clark sings, "What do you want? You know what I want!" After this point, her vocals reach to the top of the register. The song ends with Clark declaring "I want to be loved", with the last word stretching for 17 seconds.

Lyrically, "Pay Your Way in Pain" is a commentary on Clark's personal life struggles. Clark described "Pay Your Way in Pain" as "blues for 2021". In an interview with The Guardian, she explained, "I was watching the various mechanisms of power crumble, or at least get rocks thrown at them. And it seems like people have to make some Faustian bargain between dignity and survival."

== Critical reception ==
"Pay Your Way in Pain" was met with positive reviews from music critics, several of whom have compared the song's music to the works of English singer David Bowie and American musician Prince. (Note: Various publications who compared "Pay Your Way in Pain" to the music of David Bowie and Prince include The A.V. Club, Clash, The Independent, The New York Times, Paste, and Pitchfork.) Writing for Clash, Robin Murray lauded Clark's "delirious" and "semi-surreal" storytelling. He praised her vocal delivery and found the song unpredictable. Murray elaborated, writing that "just when you think you've got St. Vincent figured out, it writhes from your grasp, reaching towards something unknown." Similarly, DIY's Lisa Wright opined that the song "swiftly throws off the ragtime in favour of funk sensibilities, loose swagger and exactly the kind of tricksy duality that only someone as clever as St. Vincent can pull off", and regarded it as "the work of a master returning to their throne". Paste writer Scott Russell picked Clark's vocal performance as the most critical element of the song and described the track as "shockingly hooky and cohesive, despite feeling so loaded up with bells and whistles". In her review for The Independent, Roisin O'Connor wrote that the song is a "leather-clad saunter along a Prince-style synth hook, accompanied by her orgasmic [...] vocals".

Pitchfork's Quinn Moreland praised the song's eclectic influences and said, "No matter what character [Clark]'s channeling, her uncanny ability to transform makes her a rockstar." Alex McLevy of The A.V. Club lauded Clark's musical direction and wrote that the song "marks a stylistic turn that was always already there, hiding in plain sight, in the abrasively soulful lacerations that cut across even her most precise arrangements". Reviewing for Vulture, Justin Curtis called the song "a rollicking glam anthem" that refracts Clark's influences through her own "idiosyncratic view for a good, maybe great, St. Vincent track". Stereogum's Ryan Leas regarded the track as "Young Americans put through the St. Vincent filter". Mark Refern of Under the Radar found the song musically similar to American musician Beck's 1999 album Midnite Vultures. Several media publications, including The A.V. Club, DIY, Entertainment Weekly, Jezebel, The Independent, The New York Times, Paste, and Under the Radar, listed "Pay Your Way in Pain" as one of the best songs of its release week.

== Music video ==
The music video for "Pay Your Way in Pain" was directed by Bill Benz, who also directed the movie The Nowhere Inn (2020), which co-stars and was co-written by Clark. The former was released in conjunction with the song's release on YouTube at 08:00 EST. It was preceded by a trailer released to the same platform on March 2, 2021. Inspired by the works of Kate Bush, Bowie, and Cindy Sherman, the music video uses a grainy filter and portrays '70s downtown New York with hazy spotlights, kaleidoscope camera effects, and diffraction spikes.

The video opens to show Clark playing a piano. In it, Clark is seen with a blonde wig on, wearing a wide bottle-green lapel pants suit and an open collar shirt. As the clip progresses, she is seen singing and dancing to the song in a studio under flashing disco lights. The visual features references to '70s musical series, such as Soul Train and The Midnight Special. Vogue editor Liam Hess praised Clark's retro fashion style and described the video as showing "the full Warhol superstar fantasy".

== Credits and personnel ==
Credits adapted from Tidal and Sound on Sound.

- Annie Clark – producer, writer, vocals, guitar, sitar, Moog Grandmother, synthesizers, vocal producer
- Jack Antonoff – producer, writer, backing vocals, bass, drums, guitar, organ, percussion, vocal producer
- Kenya Hathaway – backing vocals
- Lynne Fiddmont – backing vocals
- Cian Riordan – drums, mixing, studio personnel
- Thomas Bartlett – piano
- Laura Sisk – recording, studio personnel
- John Rooney – mixing assistant, studio personnel
- Jon Sher – mixing assistant, studio personnel
- Chris Gehringer – mastering, studio personnel

== Charts ==
Chart (2021)	Peak position
US Adult Alternative Airplay (Billboard)	17
US Alternative Airplay (Billboard)	32

== Release history ==
Release date and formats for "Pay Your Way in Pain"
Region	Date	Format(s)	Label(s)	Ref.
Various	March 4, 2021	Streaming	Loma Vista; Concord	
