= Rhythm Room =

Music venue in Phoenix, Arizona

Coordinates: 33.494352°N 112.059724°W

- Interactive map of Rhythm Room
- Address: 1019 E. Indian School Rd.
- Location: Phoenix, Arizona
- Type: nightclub

Construction
- Opened: 1991

Website
- www.rhythmroom.com

The Rhythm Room is a roots, blues, and concert club located in Phoenix, Arizona. It is the venue of nationally known acts on an almost nightly basis. In 2003 the club was named by the Phoenix New Times as the "Best Club for Blues" in its "Best of Phoenix" awards. In July of that same year the club hosted a live recording session by an 88-year-old Robert Lockwood, Jr. The resulting performance, Legend Live, was released the following year by M.C. Records. A 2001 Hightone Records compilation, Rhythm Room Blues (LIVE), also captured live performances from the venue by R. L. Burnside, Kim Wilson, Sonny Rhodes, and others.

Singer-songwriter Robert Earl Keen describes a concert performed at the Rhythm Room in his song, "Furnace Fan" on his 2003 release, Farm Fresh Onions. Keen, however, misidentifies the club's location as being in the adjacent community of Scottsdale, Arizona.

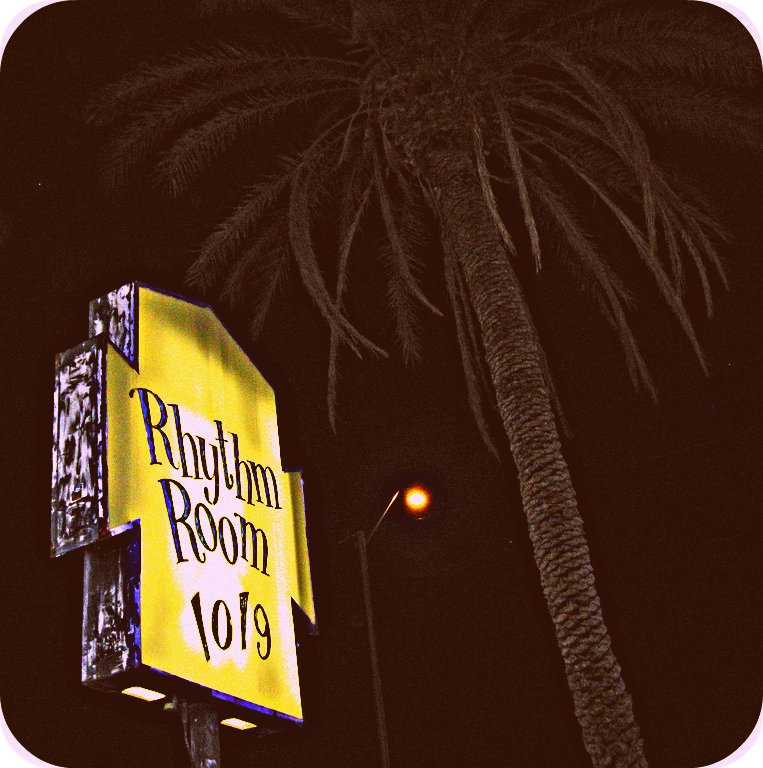
Rhythm Room venue sign

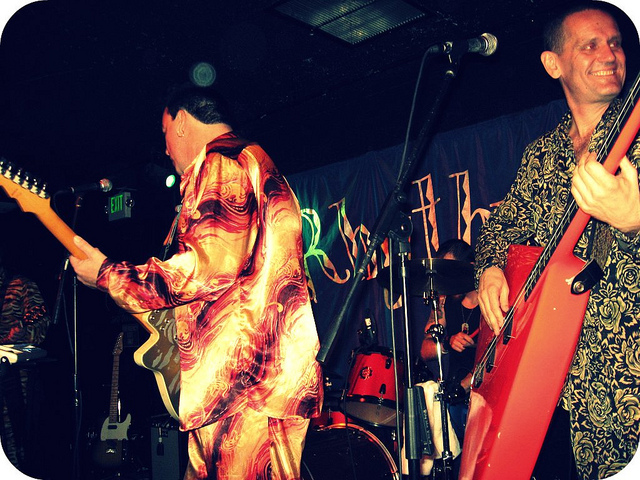
Red Elvises at Rhythm Room, June 2011

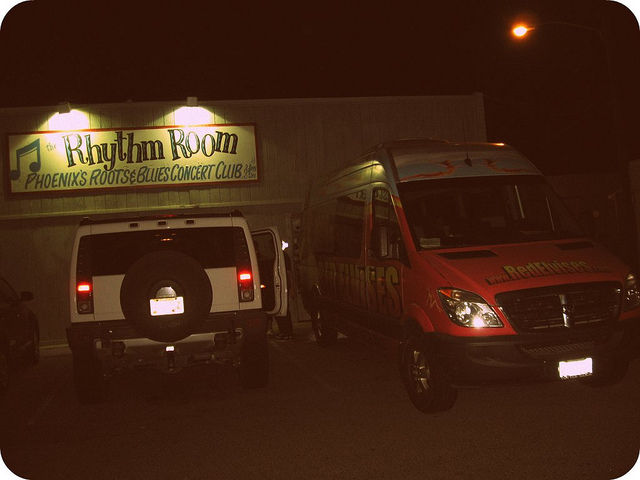
Exterior of Rhythm Room
