= Ratsliveonnoevilstar =

EP by Annie Clark
- Released: February 2, 2003
- Studio: Boo Studios (Wakefield, RI); Nailpolishmanifesto Studios
- Length: 13:14
- Label: Nail Polish Manifesto
- Producer: Annie Clark; David W. Prout

Annie Clark chronology
Ratsliveonnoevilstar (2003)	Paris is Burning (2006)

Ratsliveonnoevilstar is an EP by American musician Annie Clark, released on February 2, 2003. The title is a palindrome coined by the poet Anne Sexton.

This EP was recorded while Clark was a student at Berklee College of Music. Other Berklee students back her on the release, including jazz bassist Mark Kelley and drummer Walker Adams.

== Track listing ==
No.	Title	Length
1.	"Bliss"	3:53
2.	"Circle"	3:50
3.	"Count (Revisited)"	5:31

== Personnel ==
- Annie Clark – vocals, guitar, co-producer
- Mark Kelley – bass
- Walker Adams – drums
- David W. Prout – co-producer
- Matt Ellis – mixer
