= Daddy's Home (St. Vincent album) =

Studio album by St. Vincent
- Released: May 14, 2021
- Studios: Electric Lady (New York); Rough Customer (Brooklyn); Conway (Los Angeles); Compound Fracture (Los Angeles)
- Genres: Lounge-pop; psychedelic; funk
- Length: 43:09
- Label: Loma Vista
- Producers: Annie Clark; Jack Antonoff

St. Vincent chronology
Nina Kraviz Presents Masseduction Rewired (2018)	Daddy's Home (2021)	The Nowhere Inn (2021)

Singles from Daddy's Home
- 1. "Pay Your Way in Pain" Released: March 5, 2021; 2. "The Melting of the Sun" Released: April 2, 2021; 3. "Down" Released: May 10, 2021; 4. "Daddy's Home" Released: August 17, 2021

Daddy's Home is the sixth studio album by American musician St. Vincent, released on May 14, 2021, by Loma Vista Recordings. Like its predecessor, Masseduction (2017), Clark produced the album alongside Jack Antonoff. Daddy's Home was inspired by Clark's father's release from prison at the end of 2019, as well as the musical palette of New York City in the first half of the 1970s. The record musically incorporates lounge-pop and psychedelic music. The album won the award for Best Alternative Music Album at the 64th Annual Grammy Awards.

== Background ==
In May 2010, Clark's father, Richard Clark was convicted on one count of conspiracy, seven counts of wire fraud, five counts of securities fraud, and one count of money laundering. During his incarceration, Clark released three studio albums: Strange Mercy (2011), St. Vincent (2014) and Masseduction (2017), receiving a growing amount of attention with each album. After his release in 2019, Clark was inspired to write the album's title track and also found inspiration in music made in New York City from 1971 to 1975, a contrast to her previous albums, which were categorized as indie rock.

On December 15, 2020, Clark revealed that she would be releasing her sixth studio album in 2021. On February 25, 2021, street posters revealed that the album would be released on May 14, 2021. Clark released the album's lead single, "Pay Your Way in Pain", on March 5, 2021. In a profile with The Forty-Five following the single's release, she stated that the theme of the album would be her father's release from prison. Clark added that she wanted to narrate her "story", opining that his release from prison was "a good starting point".

== Critical reception ==
Professional ratings
Aggregate scores
Source	Rating
AnyDecentMusic?	8.2/10
Metacritic	85/100
Review scores
Source	Rating
AllMusic	4/5 stars
The A.V. Club	B
The Daily Telegraph	4/5 stars
The Guardian	5/5 stars
The Independent	5/5 stars
Mojo	5/5 stars
NME	4/5 stars
Pitchfork	6.7/10
Rolling Stone	4/5 stars
Uncut	4/5 stars

Upon release, Daddy's Home received widespread critical acclaim. On the review aggregation website Metacritic, it received an average score of 85 out of 100 based on 29 reviews, indicating "universal acclaim". AnyDecentMusic? collated reviews giving the album an average score of 8.2 out of 10 based on 32 reviews.

Rolling Stone called it "a mutant strain of retro pop steeped in New York lore", and Tom Doyle of Mojo hailed it as "a full conceptual realisation, filled with great melodies, deep grooves, colourful characterisations and sonic detail that reveals itself over repeated plays."

=== Accolades ===
Daddy's Home on year-end lists
Publication	List	Rank	Ref.
Consequence	Top 50 Best Albums of 2021	50	
Rolling Stone	The 50 Best Albums of 2021	50	
Slant	The 50 Best Albums of 2021	2	
Spin	The 30 Best Albums of 2021	21	
The Guardian	The 50 Best Albums of 2021	27	

== Daddy's Home Tour ==
The Daddy's Home Tour is a concert tour by American singer St. Vincent in support of her sixth studio album, Daddy's Home. The tour visited North America, Europe and Asia between 2021 and 2022.

The following setlist was obtained from the concert held at Central Park in Atlanta on October 22, 2021, as part of the Shaky Knees Music Festival. It does not represent all concerts for the duration of the tour.

1. "Digital Witness"
2. "Down"
3. "Birth in Reverse"
4. "Daddy's Home"
5. "New York"
6. "Los Ageless"
7. "Sugarboy"
8. "Fast Slow Disco"
9. "Pay Your Way in Pain"
10. "Fear the Future"
11. "Your Lips Are Red"
12. "The Melting of the Sun"

== Track listing ==
All tracks are written by Annie Clark, except 1, 3, 7, 8, 12, and 15 (Clark, Jack Antonoff), and 11 (Clark, Florrie Palmer).

No.	Title	Length
1.	"Pay Your Way in Pain"	3:03
2.	"Down and Out Downtown"	3:42
3.	"Daddy's Home"	3:19
4.	"Live in the Dream"	6:29
5.	"The Melting of the Sun"	4:17
6.	"Humming (Interlude 1)"	0:57
7.	"The Laughing Man"	3:25
8.	"Down"	3:26
9.	"Humming (Interlude 2)"	0:28
10.	"Somebody Like Me"	3:53
11.	"My Baby Wants a Baby"	3:20
12.	"...At the Holiday Party"	4:17
13.	"Candy Darling"	1:55
14.	"Humming (Interlude 3)"	0:38
Total length:		43:09

Japanese edition bonus track
No.	Title	Length
15.	"New York" (featuring Yoshiki)	2:54
Total length:		46:03

== Personnel ==
Musicians

- Annie Clark – vocals (1–8, 10–13), guitar (1–8, 10–13), sitar guitar (1, 2, 4–8), modular synthesizer (1), acoustic guitar (2–5, 8, 10–12), lap steel guitar (2, 5, 7), bass (2, 12), Wurlitzer (4), keyboards (7), Mellotron (7, 10), vibes (7)
- Jack Antonoff – drums (1–8, 10–13), percussion (1, 5, 8), bass (1–8, 11–13), Wurlitzer (1–4, 6–8, 10–12), guitar (1, 4, 13), backing vocals (1), synthesizers (3), Mellotron (4, 10, 13), piano (5), clavinet (5, 12), clavichord (8), acoustic guitar (12)
- Thomas Bartlett – piano (1, 10), Wurlitzer (2–5, 8, 13)
- Cian Riordan – drums (1, 5)
- Lynne Fiddmont – backing vocals (1–8, 10–13)
- Kenya Hathaway – backing vocals (1–8, 10–13)
- Evan Smith – saxophones (2, 3, 10, 12), flute (2, 10), guitar (2), synthesizers (2), clarinet (10), horns (11)
- Sam KS – drums (2, 10), congas (2)
- Patrick Kelly – bass (10)
- Greg Leisz – pedal steel guitar (10)
- Daniel Hart – violin (10)
- Michael Leonhard – trombone (12), trumpet (12)

Producers and engineers

- Annie Clark – producer
- Jack Antonoff – producer
- Laura Sisk – recording engineer
- Peter Labberton – recording engineer (10)
- John Rooney – assistant recording engineer
- Jon Sher – assistant recording engineer
- Cian Riordan – additional recording, mixer
- Chris Gehringer – mastering engineer

Artwork

- Zackery Michael – photography
- Mishka Westell – package design
- Annie Clark – art direction, creative direction
- Leah Lehrer – art direction, creative direction
- Liz Lambert – art direction
- Avigail Collins – styling
- Pamela Neal – hair
- Hinako Nishiguch – makeup

== Charts ==
Chart performance for Daddy's Home
Chart (2021)	Peak position
Australian Albums (ARIA)	15
Austrian Albums (Ö3 Austria)	18
Belgian Albums (Ultratop Flanders)	11
Belgian Albums (Ultratop Wallonia)	37
Canadian Albums (Billboard)	48
Danish Albums (Hitlisten)	31
Dutch Albums (Album Top 100)	13
Finnish Albums (Suomen virallinen lista)	45
French Albums (SNEP)	188
German Albums (Offizielle Top 100)	21
Irish Albums (Official Charts)	7
Italian Albums (FIMI)	66
Japanese Albums (Oricon)	71
Portuguese Albums (AFP)	7
Scottish Albums (Official Charts)	3
Spanish Albums (Promusicae)	48
Swedish Physical Albums (Sverigetopplistan)	10
Swiss Albums (Schweizer Hitparade)	18
UK Albums (Official Charts)	4
US Billboard 200	16
US Independent Albums (Billboard)	1
US Top Alternative Albums (Billboard)	2
US Top Rock Albums (Billboard)	2
