= The Nowhere Inn =

- Theatrical release poster
- Directed by: Bill Benz
- Written by: Carrie Brownstein; Annie Clark
- Produced by: Annie Clark; Carrie Brownstein; Lana Kim; Jett Steiger
- Starring: Annie Clark; Carrie Brownstein; Dakota Johnson
- Cinematography: Minka Farthing-Kohl
- Edited by: Ali Greer
- Music by: St. Vincent
- Production companies: Topic Studios; Ways & Means
- Distributed by: IFC Films
- Release dates: January 25, 2020 (Sundance); September 17, 2021 (United States)
- Running time: 91 minutes
- Country: United States
- Language: English
- Box office: $62,337

The Nowhere Inn is a 2020 American mockumentary psychological thriller-comedy film directed by Bill Benz from a screenplay by Annie Clark, in her film debut, and Carrie Brownstein. It stars Clark, Brownstein and Dakota Johnson.

It had its world premiere at the Sundance Film Festival on January 25, 2020. It was released on September 17, 2021 by IFC Films, and its soundtrack was released on the same day by Loma Vista.

== Plot ==
While traveling by limo, a lone St. Vincent (Annie Clark) suddenly discovers that the driver has run off.

In interview footage, Clark recalls the time she tried making a music documentary to cover her life both on- and off-stage. She hires her best friend, Carrie Brownstein, to direct the film in the hopes of getting a more intimate perspective. However, Brownstein quickly finds herself frustrated by the aimless, slice-of-life nature of the footage, Clark's bandmates' lack of knowledge about her, and the disparity between St. Vincent's aloof, emo persona with Clark's introverted, down-to-earth actual personality.

To create a narrative, Brownstein asks Clark to write a song over time. Clark accepts on the condition that Brownstein contribute a guitar solo. With this avenue into influencing the film, Brownstein suggests Clark act more like St. Vincent in the offstage footage. Although she is initially hesitant, a series of frustrating events, along with thinking that Brownstein does not find her interesting despite their friendship, convinces Clark to commit to the bit before, during, and after a concert. This produces better footage but makes Brownstein concerned.

One night, St. Vincent calls Brownstein to her room, where she forces Brownstein to film St. Vincent with her girlfriend, Dakota Johnson, on the bed wearing lingerie with her iPhone. Brownstein becomes extremely uncomfortable when St. Vincent and Johnson begin having sex right in front of her. Clark also continues playing St. Vincent whenever the cameras are not filming, and refuses to let Brownstein take a day off to visit her father, who is battling cancer. To try and wring back her normal personality, Brownstein invites a fan named Kim to meet her backstage. However, when Kim relays the story of how Strange Mercy helped her cope with the death of her boyfriend, Clark spontaneously begins crying and is comforted by a baffled Kim.

St. Vincent begins pushing Brownstein away, including cutting her off from working on the song. Hurt, Brownstein quits. As she gets on the bus to leave, though, she is confronted by her uncle, who tells her to finish the movie on her father's behalf. Brownstein obliges, but discovers that her rejection of Clark has caused her to fully embrace her St. Vincent side. After lashing out at her and the concert's board, St. Vincent freezes on stage, causing the crowd to attack her. Brownstein returns to the bus to discover that St. Vincent is throwing a party where everyone, including the band members, is wearing a wig in Clark's hairstyle. Horrified, she flees, escaping paparazzi in the process.

Brownstein interviews St. Vincent and Johnson simultaneously, the latter wearing one of the wigs. Johnson is distraught when St. Vincent requests that they stage a public breakup to get further into character, and actually breaks up with her. Angered, she decides to stage the entire documentary, hiring actors to play her family as a stereotypically Texan blended family. Finally reaching a breaking point, Brownstein takes St. Vincent to the jail where her dad is kept. (Note: In May 2010, Clark's father was convicted of one count of conspiracy, seven counts of wire fraud, five counts of securities fraud, and one count of money laundering.) This only ends up hurting Clark, who angrily says that she makes music to get away from her real world problems, not reflect on them.

Brownstein and St. Vincent record the music video for the song, "The Nowhere Inn", where Clark imagines her singing behind a ghoulish version of herself on stage. Afterwards, Brownstein turns around to discover everyone encountered in the film, including her father, is a paid actor. St. Vincent takes her away in the limo from the beginning, which begins driving increasingly fast. As they confront each other over the situation, Brownstein has the limo stop and flees into the desert. After the limo driver is also gone, the camera pulls back to reveal the limo was also part of a set. Clark then immediately walks over to where she was recording the main interview, and claims it was Brownstein, not her, who lost sight of the goal.

In a post-credits scene, as the main interview concludes, Brownstein gives St. Vincent a nod from behind the camera.

== Cast ==
- Annie Clark as herself
- Carrie Brownstein as herself
- Dakota Johnson as herself
- Ezra Buzzington as Limo Driver
- Toko Yasuda as herself
- Chris Aquilino as Neil
- Drew Connick as Robert
- Michael Bofshever as Mr. Brownstein, Carrie's Dad

== Production ==
In April 2019, it was announced Annie Clark and Carrie Brownstein had joined the cast of the film, with Bill Benz directing from a screenplay by Clark and Brownstein. The project is not a documentary but a scripted film that was to have been shot like a documentary.

== Soundtrack ==
The Nowhere Inn

Soundtrack album by St. Vincent
- Released: September 17, 2021
- Length: 29:14
- Label: Loma Vista Recordings
- Producers: Annie Clark; Jack Antonoff

St. Vincent chronology
Daddy's Home (2021)	The Nowhere Inn (2021)	All Born Screaming (2024)

The Nowhere Inn is the soundtrack album released along with the film. It was released on digital streaming services on September 17, 2021, and later on vinyl on April 23, 2022, as part of the Record Store Day.

All tracks written and produced by Annie Clark, except where noted.

The Nowhere Inn – Digital edition
No.	Title	Producer(s)	Length
1.	"The Nowhere Inn" (Clark, Carrie Brownstein)	Clark; Jack Antonoff	4:29
2.	"Carrie Voicemail"		0:33
3.	"Palm Desert" (Clark, Brownstein)		3:49
4.	"Carrie Wave"		1:30
5.	"Waiting on a Wave"		2:22
6.	"Opening Limo Scene"		1:34
7.	"Hallway Scene"		0:42
8.	"Rooftop"		1:10
9.	"Come to Jesus"		0:54
10.	"Downtempo Montage"		1:21
11.	"Sex Scene"		0:57
12.	"Board Room"		0:46
13.	"Spa Scene"		1:24
14.	"Tour Bus"		0:35
15.	"Carrie Off Bus"		0:21
16.	"Texas Intro"		0:36
17.	"Texas Choir"		1:15
18.	"Bacchanal"		2:29
19.	"Ending"		2:18
Total length:			29:14

=== Charts ===
Chart performance for The Nowhere Inn
Chart (2022)	Peak position
US Soundtrack Albums (Billboard)	14
US Top Album Sales (Billboard)	51

== Release ==
It had its world premiere at the Sundance Film Festival on January 25, 2020. The film was scheduled to screen at South by Southwest and the Tribeca Film Festival; however, both festivals were cancelled due to the COVID-19 pandemic. In March 2021, IFC Films acquired distribution rights to the film. It was released on September 17, 2021. The soundtrack album composed by Clark was released on the same day.

== Reception ==
On review aggregator website Rotten Tomatoes, the film has an approval rating of 70% based on 47 critics, with an average rating of 6/10. The website's critics consensus reads: "The Nowhere Inn may be a clever concept in search of substance, but the results are often oddly appealing." On Metacritic, The Nowhere Inn has an above average score of 60 out of a 100 based on 20 critics, indicating "mixed or average reviews".

Nick Allen of RogerEbert.com wrote: "St. Vincent and Brownstein prove to be an incredible pair to study at the center of this movie's kaleidoscope, and the film is befitting their boundless and generous creativity".

Lorry Kikta of Film Threat wrote: "On top of all the philosophical queries that The Nowhere Inn gives us, it also features some fantastic live concert footage and great music overall".

=== Accolade ===
The film was awarded with The ReFrame Stamp for its gender balanced production.
