= The Beachland Ballroom =

Music venue located in Cleveland, Ohio, US

Coordinates: 41°34′16″N 81°34′14″W

The Beachland Ballroom and Tavern
- Interactive map of The Beachland Ballroom and Tavern
- Address: 15711 Waterloo Rd. Cleveland, Ohio 44110
- Location: United States
- Owner: Cindy Barber and Mark Leddy
- Capacity: Ballroom: 500; Tavern: 148
- Type: Music Venue
- Event: Various

Construction
- Built: 1950
- Opened: March 2, 2000

Website
- beachlandballroom.com

The Beachland Ballroom and Tavern (The Beachland Ballroom or The Beachland) is a music venue located in the Collinwood neighborhood of Cleveland, Ohio, United States. It was founded by Cindy Barber and Mark Leddy.

== History ==
Originally constructed in 1950 as the Croatian Liberty Home, a center for social and "patriotic actities". The ballroom and tavern areas were part of the initial structure, with the kitchen and back bar sections being added in 1976.

Euclid Beach Park, a well-known amusement park that operated between 1894 and 1969, was located at the north end of E. 156th Street, less than a half mile north of the building. The term "Beachland" became slang for the North Collinwood neighborhood around the time, and the venue was named as an homage to the era. Nods to "Beachland" remain in various businesses throughout the area, but little of the former Euclid Beach Park still exists.
