= Kenya Hathaway =

American singer

- Genres: R&B; soul; jazz
- Occupation: Singer
- Years active: 1988–present

Kenya Hathaway is an American contemporary R&B and jazz singer.

== Early life and education ==
She is the daughter of R&B and jazz singer Donny Hathaway and classically trained vocalist Eulaulah and is the younger sister of Lalah Hathaway, also a R&B and jazz singer.

Kenya Hathaway attended the Berklee College of Music, in Boston.

== Career ==
She has performed with many prominent artists including with Lee Ritenour on his track "Papa Was A Rollin' Stone", and "Morning Glory". She has made some 30 performances on American Idol: The Search for a Superstar as a backing singer. Her older sister, Lalah Hathaway, is a singer-songwriter, record producer, arranger, and pianist.

Kenya Hathaway was also the voice actress behind Sunny Funny in the PlayStation video game, PaRappa the Rapper.
