= Paris Is Burning (EP) =

Paris is Burning

EP by St. Vincent
- Released: 2006
- Genre: Baroque pop
- Length: 11:35
- Label: Es Tee Vee

St. Vincent EP chronology
Ratsliveonnoevilstar (2003)	Paris is Burning (2006)	Marry Me (2007)

Paris is Burning is a 2006 EP release by American musician St. Vincent. "These Days" is a cover of a Nico song – written by Jackson Browne – from her album Chelsea Girl. It was her first release under the St. Vincent name.

== Track listing ==
No.	Title	Length
1.	"Paris is Burning"	4:21
2.	"What Me Worry?"	3:55
3.	"These Days"	3:19
