= Marry Me (St. Vincent album) =

2007 debut studio album by St. Vincent

Studio album by St. Vincent
- Released: July 10, 2007
- Recorded: 2007
- Genre: Indie pop; chamber pop; art rock
- Length: 43:38
- Label: Beggars Banquet
- Producer: Annie Clark with Brian Teasley; Daniel Farris

St. Vincent chronology
Paris is Burning (2006)	Marry Me (2007)	Actor (2009)

Singles from Marry Me
- 1. "Jesus Saves, I Spend" Released: July 10, 2007; 2. "Now, Now" Released: July 10, 2007

Marry Me is the debut studio album by American musician St. Vincent. It was released on July 10, 2007, in the United States and on September 3, 2007 in the United Kingdom, through Beggars Banquet Records. The album is named after a running gag from the television show Arrested Development. As of 2009, the album has sold an estimated 30,000 copies.

== Background ==
St. Vincent started working on Marry Me before she joined The Polyphonic Spree, and finished it while touring with them. Sufjan Stevens heard it and asked St. Vincent to be in his band and open for him; after a show in London opening for Stevens, Beggars Banquet Records offered St. Vincent a record contract and published the record.

She recorded most of the album's track in her bedroom in Texas. "Half the record" is composed of material that had not been played live prior to the album's recording sessions.

== Critical reception ==
Professional ratings
Aggregate scores
Source	Rating
Metacritic	78/100
Review scores
Source	Rating
AllMusic	4/5 stars
The A.V. Club	A
BBC Collective	4/5 stars
No Ripcord	8/10
Pitchfork	8.0/10
Rockfeedback	4/5 stars
Slant Magazine	4/5 stars
This Is Fake DIY	4/5 stars
Yahoo Music UK	9/10

At Metacritic, which assigns a normalized rating out of 100 to reviews from mainstream publications, the album received a rating of 78, based on 20 reviews, indicating "generally favorable reviews". Critics often praised the ambitious orchestral production of the album, while others found it overstuffed.

Giving the album a rating of 8.0 out of 10, Pitchfork compared the album to the works of art rock legends David Bowie and Kate Bush and complimented its unique brand of sonic experimentation, noting that the album "takes the more challenging route of twisting already twisted structures and unusual instrumentation to make them sound perfectly natural and, most importantly, easy to listen to as she overdubs her thrillingly sui generis vision into vibrant life". Marisa Brown of AllMusic, praising the album's inclusion of disparate elements, called it "one of the better indie pop albums that's come around for a long time" Comparing Annie Clark's "knack for grandiose orchestrations" to that of former bandmate Sufjan Stevens, Vladimir Wormwood of PopMatters notes that she "tempers these more restlessly than Sufjan. Her lyricism is more opaque and sinister and also belies a twisted sense of humor."

In a retrospective assessment of the record for its 10th anniversary, Margaret Farrell of Stereogum commended its ability to question love and marriage as a social institution. She concluded that "Marry Me made it obvious that [Clark] would have a prosperous career exposing listeners to new points of view and cunning soundscapes". Similarly, Joe Marvilli of Spectrum Culture considers that Marry Me foreshadows the acclaim of Clark's subsequent releases, asserting that "her debut may not have the same impact or cohesiveness of latter albums, but it's a wonderful example of an artist just starting out and carrying themselves with a confidence that will take them far." The album ranked 25 in Consequence's retrospective "Top 50 albums of 2007", with Lior Phillips describing the album as "playful" and noting that "[Clark's] gift for twisting and subverting, both musically and lyrically, was apparent even on this first record".

== Track listing ==
All tracks are written by Annie Clark, except where noted.

Marry Me – Standard edition
No.	Title	Writer(s)	Length
1.	"Now, Now"		4:25
2.	"Jesus Saves, I Spend"		3:56
3.	"Your Lips Are Red"	Annie Clark; Daniel Hart	4:41
4.	"Marry Me"		4:41
5.	"Paris is Burning"		4:20
6.	"All My Stars Aligned"		3:47
7.	"The Apocalypse Song"		3:47
8.	"We Put a Pearl in the Ground"	Mike Garson	1:10
9.	"Landmines"		5:07
10.	"Human Racing"		3:48
11.	"What Me Worry?"		3:56
Total length:			43:38

Marry Me – Japanese edition
No.	Title	Writer(s)	Length
12.	"These Days"	Jackson Browne	3:19
Total length:			46:57

== Personnel ==
Musicians

- Annie Clark – voices, guitars, bass, piano, organ, Moog, synthesizers, clavieta, xylophone, vibraphone, dulcimer, drum programming, triangle, percussion
- Daniel Hart – violin
- Rick Nelson – violin, viola, cello, upright bass
- Nathan Blaz – cello
- Heather Macintosh – cello
- Lauren Ross – flute, clarinet, bassoon, trumpet, French horn
- Louis Schadwron – French horn
- Mike Garson – grand piano
- Merrilee Challiss – choir
- Jessica Grant – choir
- Andrea Paschal – choir
- Lester Nuby – vibraphone
- Daniel Farris – choir, synthesizer, percussion
- Mark Pirro – bass (track 1)
- Al Carlson – sound design (track 9)
- Aynsley Powell – drum programming (track 9)
- Brian Teasley – drums, percussion

Production

- Annie Clark – production, engineering, mixing
- Brian Teasley – production, additional engineering
- Daniel Farris – production, engineering, mixing
- Mike Garson – additional engineering
- Jeff Halbert – additional engineering
- Al Carlson – additional engineering
- John Golden – mastering
- Tod Seelie – cover photo
- Mary Manning – cover photo styling
- Hanni El Khatib – design and layout

== Charts ==
Chart (2007)	Peak position
US Heatseekers Albums (Billboard)	32
