= Actor (album) =

Studio album by St. Vincent
- Released: May 4, 2009
- Studios: Elmwood Studio; The Track Studio (Plano, Texas)
- Genres: Baroque pop; indie pop; progressive pop; art pop
- Length: 39:09
- Label: 4AD
- Producers: John Congleton; Annie Clark

St. Vincent chronology
Marry Me (2007)	Actor (2009)	Strange Mercy (2011)

Singles from Actor
- 1. "Actor Out of Work" Released: April 20, 2009; 2. "Marrow" Released: November 2, 2009

Actor is the second studio album by musician St. Vincent, released by 4AD on May 4, 2009, in the United Kingdom and a day later in the United States. The artist was influenced by scores to films by Disney and Woody Allen. To prevent writer's block, she watched films without the sound and composed music for her favorite scenes. After arranging the music using GarageBand, she then wrote lyrics and added gentle vocal melodies.

Actor was promoted on the Actor Tour, with concerts in North America, Europe and Asia between February 2009 and December 2010.

== Background ==
"This was the first record I worked on with John Congleton. I started it with another producer, but things just went horribly wrong so I called John. I'd spent a long, long time on all of these tracks, all of these beautiful wind and string passages that I was trying to make into songs. I called John and said, 'You know what? I think I need to try again with these songs… I think that if I'm not careful, I'll be making the soundtrack to The Lion King, so can we just rethink this?' I went in and basically re-recorded everything but the wind and strings. It was definitely an eleventh-hour thing, with John and I together in the studio saving the record. When I was writing it, I was watching a lot of films – Disney films from the '30s and '40s. I was going for Technicolor on that record, and luckily we saved it from being the last record I ever made. The way it had been going, I'm not sure if anyone would've given it a listen. John's sonic power is strong and contagious – and, because we were already friends, I felt very comfortable with him. We were able to go about making a record with no ego or strange human relationships. We could be clearheaded about the songs and the best way to present them with the arrangements." – Annie Clark

== Reception ==
Professional ratings
Aggregate scores
Source	Rating
AnyDecentMusic?	7.4/10
Metacritic	81/100
Review scores
Source	Rating
AllMusic	4/5 stars
The A.V. Club	A−
Blender	4/5 stars
Entertainment Weekly	A
NME	6/10
Pitchfork	8.5/10
Q	3/5 stars
Rolling Stone	3.5/5 stars
Spin	8/10
Uncut	4/5 stars

The album received wide critical acclaim. In the 2009 Pazz & Jop albums survey, Actor ranked twelfth, and most of the songs on it received mentions for the singles survey. Pitchfork gave the album an 8.5/10 rating and a "Best New Music" tag, praising the concept and describing the sound as "melodic and controlled, conjuring abrasive textures that nevertheless have a clean, meticulous quality that complements her immaculate arrangements." It later placed Actor number 13 on its year-end list of albums, and "Actor Out of Work" ranked number 52 on its list of the year's top tracks. Pitchfork included "The Strangers" at number 492 on its list of the top tracks of the 2000s.

The A.V. Club's review called the album a departure from St. Vincent's debut, noting an absence of "the coy, conventional pop winks of Marry Me; even Actor's lovelier moments come tinged with down-the-rabbit-hole danger." Clark has "found her own voice—and it's one you wouldn't want reading your kids any bedtime stories."

Other reviewers, such as Entertainment Weekly and AllMusic, praised the album's contrast of melodic pop and distorted guitars with dark lyrics. PopMatters listed Actor number 26 on its list of the year's best albums.

== Commercial performance ==
As of July 2011, Actor has sold 59,000 copies in US.

== Singles ==
The first single released was "Actor Out of Work" that April. It featured "Bicycle" as a B-side. The music video for "Actor Out of Work" was premiered April 10, 2009 on Spinner. In it, Clark auditions a series of actors who begin sobbing in front of her.

The video for "Laughing with a Mouth of Blood" features Clark with comedy duo ThunderAnt as owners of a feminist bookstore.

== Track listing ==
All tracks written and arranged by Annie Clark.

Actor – Standard edition
No.	Title	Length
1.	"The Strangers"	4:05
2.	"Save Me from What I Want"	3:35
3.	"The Neighbors"	3:31
4.	"Actor Out of Work"	2:15
5.	"Black Rainbow"	4:11
6.	"Laughing with a Mouth of Blood"	3:02
7.	"Marrow"	3:24
8.	"The Bed"	3:43
9.	"The Party"	4:05
10.	"Just the Same but Brand New"	5:24
11.	"The Sequel"	1:54
Total length:		39:09

Actor – iTunes edition
No.	Title	Length
8.	"Oh My God"	4:29
9.	"The Bed"	3:43
10.	"The Party"	4:05
11.	"Just the Same but Brand New"	5:24
12.	"The Sequel"	1:54
Total length:		43:34

Actor – Amazon edition
No.	Title	Length
12.	"Bicycle"	3:19
Total length:		42:23

Notes

- On the album's vinyl release, "The Sequel" is moved to the end of side A, following "Black Rainbow".

== Personnel ==
Musicians

- Annie Clark – voice, guitar, bass, keys, etc.
- Hideaki Aomori – flute, clarinet, bass clarinet, alto, tenor and soprano saxophone
- Michael Atkinson – French horn, score consultant
- Daniel Hart – violin, sarangi
- McKenzie Smith – drums
- Alex Sopp – flute
- Paul Alexander – additional bass
- William Flynn – additional bass
- Jeff Ryan – additional drums
- Matthias Bossi – additional drums
- Aynsley Powell – additional drums

Production

- John Congleton – production, recording, mixing
- Annie Clark – production, additional recording
- Greg Calbi – mastering
- Scott Solter – additional recording
- Annabel Mehran – photography
- Lever and Beam – management

== Charts ==
Chart (2009)	Peak position
UK Albums Chart	161
U.S. Billboard 200	90
U.S. Alternative Albums	20
U.S. Independent Albums	9
U.S. Rock Albums	48
