= Actor Out of Work =

Single by St. Vincent

from the album Actor
- B-side: "Bicycle"
- Released: April 20, 2009
- Genre: Indie rock
- Length: 2:15
- Label: 4AD
- Songwriter: Annie Clark
- Producers: John Congleton; Annie Clark

St. Vincent singles chronology
"Jesus Saves, I Spend" (2007)	"Actor Out of Work" (2009)	"Marrow" (2009)

Music video
- "Actor Out of Work" on YouTube

"Actor Out of Work" is a song by American musician St. Vincent for her second studio album Actor (2009). It was released on April 20, 2009, through 4AD, as the second single from the album. Written in one night as a reaction to her producer's comments on the rest of Actor, the song features an aggressive rock sound and lyrics addressing a deceitful lover.

"Actor Out of Work" was accompanied by a music video featuring actors crying at an audition run by St. Vincent. The song received positive reviews from music critics upon its release and has since attracted praise as a highlight of Actor and one of St. Vincent's best songs.

== Background ==
St. Vincent wrote "Actor Out of Work" in one night at the request of her producer John Congleton, who was frustrated with how the rest of the material for the Actor album "sounded like outtakes from the Lion King on Broadway." St. Vincent recalled, "I wrote 'Actor Out of Work' at my mom's house in my childhood bedroom. I felt like a fraud. I felt like people were frauds. I wanted to be hit. I wanted to hit."

The song's studio arrangement took influence from Brian Eno's Here Come the Warm Jets. Lyrically, the song uses the image of an out-of-work actor to represent an unconvincing lover.

== Release ==
"Actor Out of Work" was chosen as the lead single for the album Actor, being released by 4AD in April 2009. The B-side of the single was "Bicycle". The single did not chart.

== Critical reception ==
"Actor Out of Work" saw a positive critical reception upon its release as a single. Pitchfork stated, "Her acerbic lyrics and skewed production—the kind that wouldn't sound out of place at the mixing board of a beardy noise-rocker—belie a crystalline voice and a face that could land any actor work. Tough love never sounded sweeter, and 'Actor Out of Work' is no exception." Complex commented, "The song features some nice backup vocals, driving drums, and has a nice hummable melody. ... Check it out."

In reviews for Actor, "Actor Out of Work" was often singled out for praise. Heather Phares of AllMusic described it as "forceful" and noted, "The song's brisk dance between hot and cold is dazzling." The A.V. Club noted how the song evoked the "tumultuous marriage of prog and new wave typified by Scary Monsters-era Bowie and early Peter Gabriel."

The song has also appeared in several rankings. Pitchfork listed it as the 52nd best song of 2009, noting, "Annie Clark gave herself exactly 135 seconds for this audition, and makes the most of them." Additionally, the Guardian, Paste Magazine, and Stereogum all included the song on their lists of the best St. Vincent songs.

== Music video ==
A music video directed by the team Terri Timely was produced for "Actor Out of Work", where St. Vincent holds auditions for a series of actors, each of whom attempts their best performative crying breakdown. St. Vincent commented on the reaction to the video, "A lot of people got confused and thought I was so mean that I made people cry, which was not what I intended... but I sort of like it."

The video also brought St. Vincent to the attention to future collaborator David Byrne, who later said, "When I met Annie I complimented her on how disturbing her video was."
