= Strange Mercy =

2011 studio album by St. Vincent

Studio album by St. Vincent
- Released: September 12, 2011
- Studio: Elmwood Studios (Dallas, Texas)
- Genres: Art pop; baroque pop; progressive pop
- Length: 40:51
- Label: 4AD
- Producer: John Congleton

St. Vincent chronology
Actor (2009)	Strange Mercy (2011)	4AD Session (2012)

Singles from Strange Mercy
- 1. "Surgeon" Released: August 15, 2011; 2. "Cruel" Released: August 21, 2011; 3. "Cheerleader" Released: February 13, 2012

Strange Mercy is the third studio album by American musician St. Vincent, released on September 12, 2011, by 4AD, in the United Kingdom and a day later in the United States. The album's cover art was designed by St. Vincent, and was photographed by Tina Tyrell. The album peaked at No. 19 on the Billboard 200, and was St. Vincent's highest-charting album at the time, later being surpassed by her next two solo albums, St. Vincent (2014) and Masseduction (2017). In addition, Strange Mercy received significant critical acclaim.

The album was recognized as the 23rd Best Album of the Decade So Far by Pitchfork in August 2014. Strange Mercy sold nearly 30,000 copies in the three weeks following its release, according to Nielsen SoundScan. As of January 2012, UK sales stand at 7,500 copies according to The Guardian.

== Background and recording ==
Strange Mercy was written in Seattle while Annie Clark spent time in isolation, an experience she described as a "loneliness experiment" and "a cleanse". This was to escape from the information overload she was experiencing with New York and modern technology. Clark arrived in Seattle in October 2010, stayed at the Ace Hotel and used a studio provided by Jason McGerr.

The album was announced in a Twitter post on January 12, 2011. In early March, producer John Congleton, who also worked with Clark on Actor (2009), commented that he and Clark were nearly a third of the way through recording the new release. The album was recorded at Elmwood Studio in Dallas, Texas.

In July 2011, Clark announced that a track from Strange Mercy would be unlocked when enough Twitter users tweeted the hashtag "#strangemercy". During the campaign, teaser videos for the album, which Clark described as riffing on the idea of "strange mercy", were released. On July 22, 2011, the album track "Surgeon" was released as a free MP3 download following the Twitter campaign. On August 25, 2011, a video for "Cruel" was released. On September 4, 2011, Strange Mercy was streamed in its entirety on NPR Music.

== Music videos ==
The first music video from the album, "Cruel", was released on August 25, 2011. The music video, which featured Clark being kidnapped by a motherless family, being forced to be a wife in the family and being buried alive, was filmed around San Francisco and on Mare Island.

A second music video from the album, "Cheerleader", was released on February 7, 2012. The video, directed by Hiro Murai, was inspired by the artwork of Ron Mueck. It featured a giant Clark tied to the center of a gallery space, surrounded by onlookers.

== Lyrics ==
Strange Mercy was described as being more personal than previous St. Vincent albums. "Chloe in the Afternoon", the album's opener, explores Clark's misgivings about monogamy, particularly the societal pressures on and assumptions about human relationships. The lyrics "Best, finest surgeon. Come cut me open" in the track "Surgeon" were taken from a line written in Marilyn Monroe's journal. Clark found that line to be "brilliant and really strange", saying "And I was – I put, you know, inspiration from my own life for various situational depression or what – call it what you will. And this line, best finest surgeon, really resonated with me." The album closer "Year of the Tiger" was written about the depression Clark experienced in 2010, the Year of the Tiger in the Chinese calendar. Clark did not elaborate on what caused her depression.

== Critical reception ==
Professional ratings
Aggregate scores
Source	Rating
AnyDecentMusic?	8.1/10
Metacritic	85/100
Review scores
Source	Rating
AllMusic	4/5 stars
The A.V. Club	A−
The Daily Telegraph	5/5 stars
Entertainment Weekly	A−
The Guardian	4/5 stars
Los Angeles Times	2.5/4 stars
NME	9/10
Pitchfork	9.0/10
Rolling Stone	3.5/5 stars
Spin	9/10

Strange Mercy has received critical acclaim. On the review aggregate site Metacritic, the album has a score of 85 out of 100, indicating "universal acclaim". Pitchfork's Ryan Dombal gave the album a "Best New Music" designation, writing "Here, Clark's role-playing is grounded in emotions that are as cryptic as they are genuine and affecting. And when her voice can't bear it, her guitar does the screaming." Drowned in Sound's Sean Adams also gave the album a positive review, writing, "Don't be fooled by them saucer-like bambi eyes[...] or her tip-top indie-rock-positioning system[...] because this is an album that rockets toward you, ricochets through your emotions and finally decides to lay you down on the floor, headphones on, tumbling around like a blissed-out cat in the sun." Spin's Stacey Anderson called Strange Mercy St. Vincent's "most mercurial [album] yet", continuing: "Clark's complex femininity, both self-possessed and keenly evolving, is what makes her music so powerful and fascinating." Q also gave the album a positive review, writing: "Combining elegance and menace expertly, Clark's vocals drift languidly amid swimmy guitars, siren-like choirs and strings, while lyrical undercurrents of anger, hysteria and black humour tug beneath the surface." Arnold Pan of PopMatters praised the album for balancing experimentation and accessibility, writing "It's as if Strange Mercy is making the case that high art can have a popular dimension—and the reverse, too, that pop culture can be high-minded and artful. Like peers such as Animal Collective and Dirty Projectors, Clark creates challenging music that doesn't go over your head even though you realize there's more going on with it than you can wrap your mind around."

In a more mixed review, BBC Music's Wyndham Wallace called Strange Mercy "a little underwhelming", writing that there was a lack of standout tracks. Wallace continued: "[...] ultimately Strange Mercy sounds like her best record still lies ahead, once she feels a little more at ease with balancing her obviously multiple talents."

=== Accolades ===
Strange Mercy has appeared on many end-of-year lists. Paste ranked the album No. 11 on its list of the best 50 albums of 2011. The same website also called the track "Cruel" the 13th best song of 2011, writing "The simple lyrics about how hurtful and painful the pressure of looks can have on a person are accompanied by a Talking Heads-like progression. It is difficult to be upset when this song gets stuck in your head." Q ranked the album No. 8 on its list of the top 50 albums of 2011, while NME ranked the album No. 7 on its end-of-year list. Uncut placed Strange Mercy at No. 43. Pitchfork ranked the album No. 11 on its list of the Top 50 Albums of 2011, with Stephen Deusner writing: "Strange Mercy is always on its toes, always toying with some new idea, always building toward the oddly satisfying payoff. The song might be a narrative or an uncomfortable explication of the life of an indie rock artist, and the ambiguity, not to mention the ambivalence, stings. By totally embracing that off-kilter danger, Clark opened up a raw and brave new vocabulary." In 2013, NME listed the album at 369 in their list of the 500 greatest albums of all time.

Consequence of Sound named the record the ninth best album of the 2010s decade, and Pitchfork ranked it at 55 on their Best Albums of the 2010s list.

== Tour and performances ==
On January 20, 2012, Clark announced a tour in support of Strange Mercy. The tour included a performance at the Coachella Valley Music and Arts Festival, as well as two co-headlining shows with Tune-Yards.

St. Vincent has also performed songs from Strange Mercy on several television shows. On January 16, 2012, she performed "Cheerleader" on Conan. On February 13, 2012, St. Vincent performed "Cruel" and "Cheerleader" on the Gossip Girl episode "Crazy, Cupid, Love". On May 1, 2012, she performed "Cruel" and "Cheerleader" on Later... with Jools Holland.

== Track listing ==
All songs written by Annie Clark, except where noted.

Strange Mercy – Standard edition
No.	Title	Writer(s)	Length
1.	"Chloe in the Afternoon"		2:55
2.	"Cruel"		3:34
3.	"Cheerleader"		3:28
4.	"Surgeon"		4:25
5.	"Northern Lights"		3:33
6.	"Strange Mercy"		4:28
7.	"Neutered Fruit"		4:13
8.	"Champagne Year"		3:28
9.	"Dilettante"		4:03
10.	"Hysterical Strength"		3:16
11.	"Year of the Tiger"	Annie Clark; Sharon Clark	3:28
Total length:			40:51

Strange Mercy – Japanese edition
No.	Title	Length
12.	"This Wave"	3:25
13.	"Year of the Tiger" (Live: 4AD Session)	4:10
Total length:		48:26

Stranger Mercy – CD+DVD Deluxe edition (DVD)
No.	Title	Length
1.	"Cheerleader" (Video)	3:28
2.	"Cruel" (Video)	3:34
3.	"4AD Session" (recorded at the Shangri-La Studio, New York, 6 September 2011)	18:47
Total length:		18:49

== Personnel ==
Credits are adapted from the Strange Mercy liner notes.

- Annie Clark – vocals, guitar, keyboards
- Bobby Sparks – Minimoog, clavinet, ARP, Wurlitzer
- McKenzie Smith – drum kit
- Daniel Hart – violin, additional string arrangement
- Evan Smith – saxophone, clarinet, flute
- Brian LeBarton – additional keyboards
- John Congleton – drum programming, production
- Phil Palazzolo – additional woodwind engineering
- Lever and Beam – management

== Charts ==
Chart performance for Strange Mercy
Chart (2011)	Peak position
Canadian Albums Chart	63
UK Albums Chart	117
UK Independent Albums	19
US Billboard 200	19
US Independent Albums	6

== 4AD Session ==
4AD Session

EP by St. Vincent
- Released: April 10, 2012
- Recorded: September 6, 2011
- Venues: Shangri-La (New York City, New York)
- Length: 18:47
- Label: 4AD
- Directors: Iain Forsyth; Jane Pollard
- Producers: Natalie Johns; Dig For Fire

St. Vincent chronology
Strange Mercy (2011)	4AD Session (2012)	Love This Giant (2012)

4AD Session is a live EP by American musician St. Vincent, released on April 10, 2012, by 4AD. Consisting of live renditions of five songs from Strange Mercy, it was recorded at Shangri-La Studio on September 6, 2011. A video recording of the performance was also included in the deluxe Stranger Mercy reissue of the album.

=== Track listing ===
No.	Title	Length
1.	"Chloe in the Afternoon"	2:56
2.	"Surgeon"	4:26
3.	"Strange Mercy"	4:18
4.	"Cheerleader"	3:30
5.	"Year of the Tiger"	3:37
Total length:		18:47

=== Band ===
- Annie Clark – guitar, vocals
- Daniel Mintseris – keys
- Toko Yasuda – Moog
- Matthew Johnson – drums
