= Stop Dragging Me Down =

Stop Draggin Me Down

Studio album by Mono Men
- Released: June 1990
- Recorded: 1990
- Studios: Egg, Seattle
- Genre: Garage rock
- Label: Estrus
- Producer: Richard Head

Mono Men chronology
| Stop Draggin Me Down (1990) | Wrecker (1992) |

Stop Draggin Me Down is the debut album by the Bellingham, Washington-based garage rock group the Mono Men, released in 1990.

== Background ==
Stop Draggin Me Down is the only studio record to feature guitarist Marc "Marx" Wright. There were 3,000 copies of "Stop Draggin Me Down" pressed. The first 500 copies featured transparent yellow vinyl. The cover art for the album was done by Phil White and designed by Art Chantry.

== Critical reception ==
Professional ratings
Review scores
| Source | Rating |
|---|---|
| AllMusic | 3/5 stars |
| MusicHound Rock: The Essential Album Guide | 3/5 stars |

Trouser Press wrote that "while the Men are heard at their best on singles — if you need proof, check out any of the three dozen (!) or so they’ve released — there’s enough dynamic sense in the band’s bag of tricks to sustain an album without ramalama burnout."

== Track listing ==
Side A
| No. | Title | Writer(s) | Length |
|---|---|---|---|
| 1. | "Stop Draggin Me Down" | Dave Crider | 3:03 |
| 2. | "Right Now" | Crider, Marc "Marx" Wright | 2:49 |
| 3. | "Boss" | Jack Wenzel | 1:49 |
| 4. | "Ain't No Friend of Mine" | The Sparkles | 2:43 |
| 5. | "No Way Back" | Crider | 2:40 |
| 6. | "I Don't Care" | The Mono Men | 3:18 |

Side B
| No. | Title | Writer(s) | Length |
|---|---|---|---|
| 1. | "Dead End" | Crider, Wright | 4:02 |
| 2. | "That's Her" | Wright | 2:53 |
| 3. | "Girl" | Crider | 2:21 |
| 4. | "Stay Awake" | Crider | 3:35 |
| 5. | "Fate" | Crider, Wright | 2:35 |
| 6. | "Reptile" | Ledge Morrisette | 2:02 |

== Personnel ==
The Mono Men

- Dave Crider – guitar vocals
- Marc "Marx" Wright – guitar vocals
- Ledge Morrisette – bass guitar
- Aaron Roeder – drums
- Josie Cat – organ on "Reptile"

Production

- Produced by Richard Head
- Engineered by Conrad Uno
- Executive producer Jay Haskins
- Cover concept by Art Chantry; completed by Phil White
