= World Out of Mind! =

EP by Man or Astro-man?
- Released: 1995
- Recorded: Zero Return 1995
- Genre: Surf rock
- Label: Estrus Records

Man or Astro-man? chronology
Needles in the Cosmic Haystack (1995)	World Out of Mind! (1995)	Espanto del Futuro (1995)

World Out of Mind is also the title of a science fiction novel by J. T. McIntosh

World Out of Mind is a Man or Astro-man? 7-inch EP released on Estrus Records in 1995. It was released exclusively on clear yellow-orange vinyl. Art Chantry designed/illustrated the cover. The cover is die-cut, with a rounded top and 3 lightning bolts cut out.

== Track listing ==
=== C Side ===
- "Escape Velocity"
- "Tomorrow Plus X"

=== D Side ===
- "Max Q"
- "The Quatermass Phenomenon"
