= Uncanny Valley (disambiguation) =

Uncanny valley is a hypothesis that human replicas that appear almost, but not exactly, like real human beings elicit feelings of eeriness and revulsion among some observers.

Uncanny valley may also refer to:

== Albums ==
- Uncanny Valley (Birds of Avalon album), 2009
- Uncanny Valley (Midnight Juggernauts album), 2013
- Uncanney Valley, a 2013 album by The Dismemberment Plan
- The Uncanny Valley, a 2016 album by Perturbator
- Uncanny Valley, a 2022 album by Coin

== Television and film ==
- The Uncanny Valley, Criminal Minds episode (S5 E12)
- Uncanny Valley (film), a 2015 Argentine short film by Federico Heller
- The Uncanny Valley (The Lincoln Lawyer), a 2022 television episode

== Music ==
- "Uncanny Valley", a song by Melanie Martinez, 2026

== Books ==
- Uncanny Valley: Adventures in the Narrative, a 2011 collection of narrative nonfiction by Lawrence Weschler
- "Uncanny Valley", a 2017 science fiction short story by Greg Egan
- Uncanny Valley, a 2020 memoir by Anna Wiener
