= Your Weight on the Moon =

- Cover to the EP

EP by Man or Astro-man?
- Released: 1994
- Genre: Surf rock
- Length: 26:08
- Language: English
- Label: One Louder

Man or Astro-man? chronology
Destroy All Astromen! (1994)	Your Weight on the Moon (1994)	Inside the Head of... Mr. Atom (1994)

Vinyl
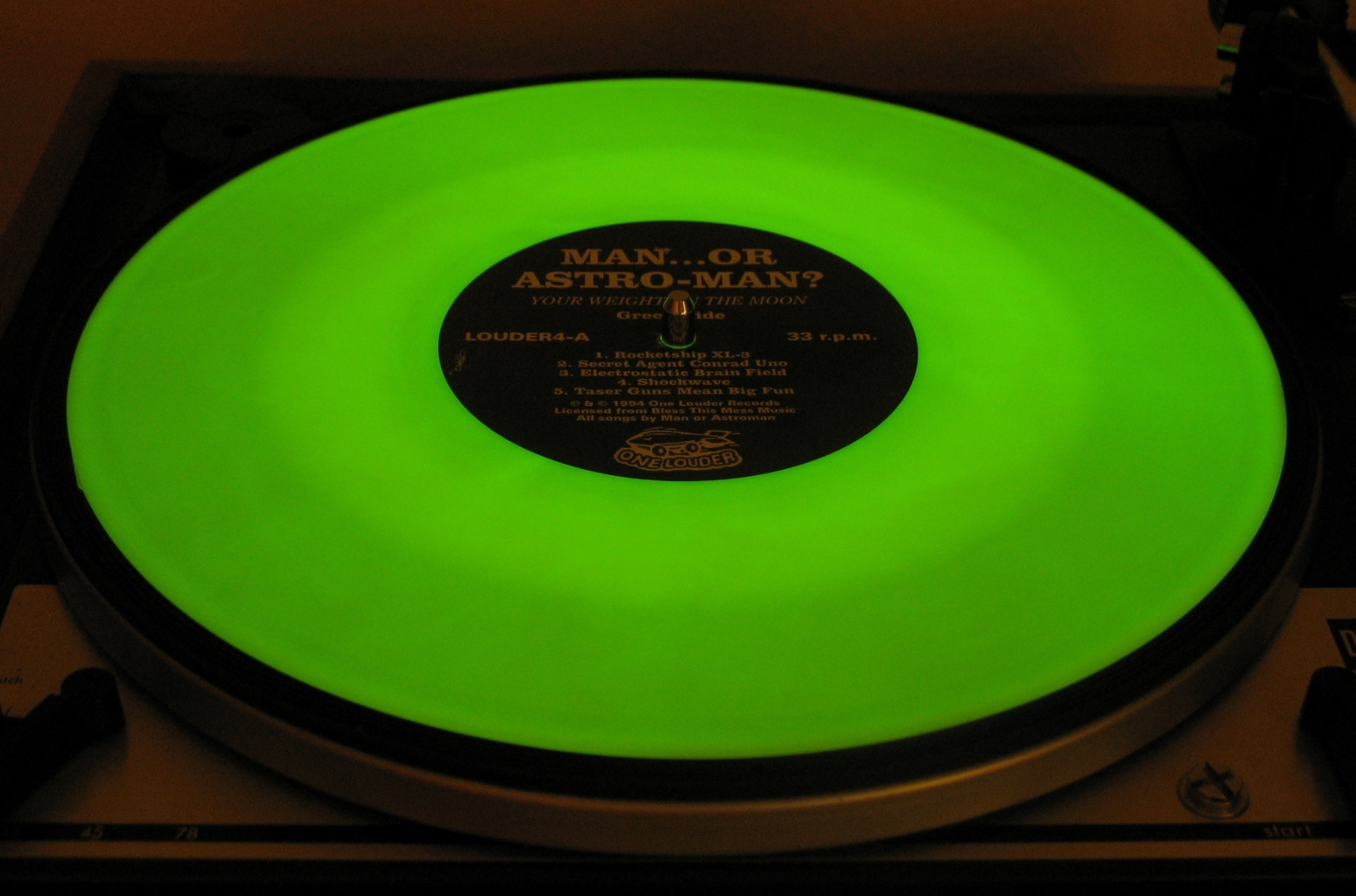
- Glow-in-the-dark 10"

Your Weight on the Moon is a 10" EP/CDEP by Man or Astro-man? released in 1994. The 10" vinyl was pressed on four different colors of vinyl: black, opaque pink, opaque silvery-gray and glow-in-the-dark. The Man or Astro-man official discography points out that one should know one's mass rather than one's weight.

Your Weight on the Moon was reissued on CD in 2011 by Overground Records with nine additional tracks taken from the 1993 Mission into Chaos! 7-inch and the 1995 Return to Chaos 7-inch.

== Track listing ==
Side one

1. "Rocketship XL-3" – 2:33
2. "Special Agent Conrad Uno" – 2:22
3. "Electrostatic Brain Field" – 3:18
4. "Shockwave" – 2:34
5. "Taser Guns Mean Big Fun" – 2:17

Side two

6. "F=GmM(moon)/R^{2}" – 2:17
7. "Space Patrol" – 2:05
8. "Happy Fingers" – 2:36
9. "Destination Venus" – 2:50 (The Rezillos)
10. "Polaris" – 3:16
