= Astro Launch =

EP by Man or Astro-man?
- Released: 1994
- Recorded: Zero Return 1994
- Genre: Surf rock
- Label: Estrus Records

Man or Astro-man? chronology
The Various Boss Sounds from Beyond the Far Reaches... and Then Some! (1994)	Astro Launch (1994)	The Brains of the Cosmos (1994)

Astro Launch is one of many 7-inch EPs Man or Astro-man? released in 1994. It was released on Estrus Records on clear orange vinyl and black vinyl. As the black vinyl copies are pressed onto translucent black vinyl, some discographies list the vinyl color as "rootbeer" or "clear rootbeer". There are also some copies pressed on opaque gray vinyl, and at least one copy on dark, ruby-red vinyl. "Transmission from Venus '94" is a re-recording of a song Man or Astro-man? recorded in 1993 and released on a Roger Corman tribute compilation. The back cover states that a secret vocal version of "Philip K. Dick" on cassette can be obtained from Man or Astro-man? for $1. The cover art was designed by Art Chantry.

== Track listing ==
=== A Side ===
- "Philip K. Dick in the Pet Section of a Wal-Mart"
- "The Man from U.N.C.L.E." (Jerry Goldsmith)

=== B Side ===
- "Transmission from Venus '94"
- "Time Bomb" (The Avengers VI)

== Line Up ==
- Star Crunch - Lead Guitar & "Han" Solos
- Birdstuff - Space Skins and Apologies for stepping on the Hi Hat during the intro of "Transmissions," when Coco said to be quiet
- The Amazing Dr. Deleto - 4-string US bass, 3-string English bass, 2-string Belgian bass and the organ where every key works, most of the time
- Coco the Electronic Monkey Wizard - Tubes
