= Inside the Head of... Mr. Atom =

EP by Man or Astro-man?
- Released: 1994
- Recorded: Chicago, Earth 1994
- Genre: Surf rock
- Label: Estrus Records

Man or Astro-man? chronology
Your Weight on the Moon (1994)	Inside the Head of... Mr. Atom (1994)	Creature Feature (1994)

Inside the Head of... Mr. Atom is a Man or Astro-man? 7-inch EP released on Estrus Records in 1995. It was recorded by Steve Albini. The cover art and design is by Art Chantry. The back cover states "This single is dedicated to the vital memory of the band Bolt Thrower." It was released on clear green vinyl, opaque purple vinyl, opaque gray vinyl and black vinyl. Early pressings of the 7-inch have red and yellow center labels. The center labels on later pressings are black and silver, and these were available on black vinyl and gray vinyl (a few are known to have white streaks marbled throughout the black vinyl).

== Known variations ==
=== Early pressings (denoted by red and yellow center label) ===
1. Clear green vinyl
2. Opaque, marbled purple vinyl
3. Black vinyl

=== Later pressings (denoted by black and silver center label) ===
1. Black vinyl
2. Opaque gray vinyl
3. Black vinyl, marbled with white streaks

== Track listing ==
=== Fore Brain ===
- "Sferic Waves"
- "Inside the Atom"

=== Hind Brain ===
- "Put Your Fingers in the Socket"
- "24 Hours"

== Line Up ==
- Captain Zeno - Spontaneous Combustion
- Birdstuff - 440 Hair Stand Up Maneuver
- Star Crunch - Evil Wool Sock Carpet Walk Shock Trick
- Coco the Electronic Monkey Wizard - Complete Brown Out
