= Amazing Thrills! in 3-Dimension =

EP by Man or Astro-man?
- Released: June 1993
- Genre: Surf rock
- Label: Estrus Records

Man or Astro-man? chronology
Is It ... Man or Astroman? (1993)	Amazing Thrills! in 3-Dimension (1993)	Supersonic Toothbrush Helmet (1993)

Amazing Thrills! in 3-Dimension is a Man or Astro-man? promo 7" that was given away with the first 1,000 copies of their debut album, Is It ... Man or Astroman?. It was released on Estrus Records in 1993 on black vinyl only. By some counts, 1,000 copies is a generous estimate, as the Estrus website places the actual number pressed as only 400 (200 given to the band and 200 distributed to the first 200 people to order the first LP directly from Estrus). This is the first time Man or Astro-man's cover of the Mystery Science Theater 3000 theme song was released. It was later re-released on Destroy All Astromen!.

== Track listing ==
=== A Side ===
- "Out of Limits" (M. Gordon)
- "Radio Promo"

=== B Side ===
- "MST 3000 Love Theme" (Hodgson, Weinstein, Erikson)
- "Reverb 1000 (Live)"

== Line Up ==
- Star Crunch
- Birdstuff
- The Amazing Dr. Deleto
- Coco the Electronic Monkey Wizard
