= Needles in the Cosmic Haystack =

EP by Man or Astro-man?
- Released: 1995
- Genre: Surf rock
- Label: East Side Records

Man or Astro-man? chronology
| Postphonic Star Exploration (1995) | Needles in the Cosmic Haystack (1995) | World Out of Mind! (1995) |

Needles in the Cosmic Haystack is a Man or Astro-man? 7-inch EP released on Tempe-based East Side Records in 1995. It was released exclusively on black vinyl. The original sleeves were misprinted so that the title read simply: Haystack. The misprinted sleeve had this effect:

error sleeve

Along with the misprinted sleeves, original inner labels misspelled "Supernova" and instead attributed the b-side track to Supernove:

error label

Both the misprinted sleeves and the misspelled labels were corrected on the second pressing, though some of the first press records may have been distributed with the corrected sleeve. On all pressings of the single, the printing on B side's inner label cuts off the final "S" on East Side Records. The A side ("Radio Fission") was later reworked and released on Experiment Zero as "Television Fission". The artwork was the brain child of local Tempe artist Brian Marsland.

== Track listing ==
=== Black Hole Entrance Side ===
- "Radio Fission"

=== Black Hole Exit Side ===
- "Calling Hong Kong" (Supernova)
