= The Cherry Valence =

American garage rock band

- Origin: Raleigh, North Carolina, United States
- Genres: Garage rock
- Years active: 1998 - present
- Labels: Estrus Records; Flapping Jet; Bifocal Media
- Members: Jamie Williams; Brian Quast; Nick Whitley; Charles Story
- Past members: Cheetie Kumar; Paul Siler

The Cherry Valence is an American garage rock band from Raleigh, North Carolina. The group's sound is indebted to 1970s hard rock, and the group has the unusual distinction of two members who switch off on lead vocals and drums. They formed in 1998 and toured relentlessly across the US, releasing their first recording (a 7") in 1999. Two LPs for Estrus Records followed before bassist Siler and guitarist Kumar left the group to form Birds of Avalon in 2004. Adding new members to the group, they released a third full length on Bifocal Media in mid-2005.

Cherry Valence is a reference to the character from The Outsiders (novel), a 1967 novel by S. E. Hinton, subsequently made into the 1983 film of the same name.

== Members ==
Current members

- Jamie Williams - guitar
- Brian Quast - drums, vocals, keyboards
- Nick Whitley - drums, vocals
- Charles Story - bass

Former members

- Cheetie Kumar - guitar
- Paul Siler - bass

== Discography ==
- The Cherry Valence (Estrus Records, 2001)
- Riffin' (Estrus, 2002)
- Revival EP (Flapping Jet, 2002)
- TCV3 (Bifocal Media, 2005)
