= Live Transmissions from Uranus =

Live Transmissions From Uranus

Live album by Man or Astro-man?
- Released: 1995
- Recorded: November 19, 1994
- Genre: Surf rock
- Length: 47:55
- Label: One Louder Records, Homo Habilis (HH101LP), Touch and Go Records (re-issue)
- Producer: Jim Marrer and Birdstuff (Brian Teasley)

Man or Astro-man? chronology
Welcome to the Sonic Space Age (1995)	Live Transmissions From Uranus (1995)	Project Infinity (1995)

Professional ratings
Review scores
Source	Rating
Allmusic	2.5/5 stars

Live Transmissions From Uranus!! is a full-length album released by the surf rock group Man or Astro-man?. It was recorded live at the Covered Dish in Gainesville, Florida on November 19, 1994. It was available on CD and on standard, black vinyl through Homo Habilis records. It was also released on CD and as a limited 12" picture disc through One Louder records in the UK. It was later reissued through the Chicago-based label Touch and Go Records. Design by Art Chantry, and cover photos by Kyle Scott.

== Track listing ==
1. "Intro Sample" (from The Leech Woman) - 1:00
2. "Transmissions from Uranus" - 2:23
3. "Time Bomb" (Avengers VI) - 1:57
4. "Special Agent Conrad Uno" - 3:07
5. "Sferic Waves" - 2:42
6. "Destination Venus" (The Rezillos) - 4:21
7. "Name of Numbers" - 1:27
8. "A Mouthful of Exhaust" - 2:43
9. "Cowboy Playing Bombora" (The Original Surfaris) - 4:19
10. "Mystery Science Theater 3000 Love Theme" (Hodgson, Weinstein, Erikson) - 2:16
11. "Gargantua's Last Stand" - 2:13
12. "Surfari" (The Original Surfaris) - 1:58
13. "Rovers" - 3:25
14. "Manta Ray" (The Pixies) - 2:15
15. "Man from F.U.C.K. Y.O.U." (Jerry Goldsmith) - 1:32
16. "Eric Estrotica" - 3:22
17. "Nitrous Burnout" - 5:54

== Line Up ==
- Birdstuff: Mike hits and stick dropping
- Captain Zeno: Anti-rhythm guitar, wrong bass lines, and broken organ
- Coco the Electronic Monkey Wizard: Botched samples and unintonated bass
