= Is It ... Man or Astroman? =

Is It ... Man Or Astroman?

Studio album by Man or Astro-man?
- Released: 1993
- Genre: Surf rock
- Length: 41:44 (CD); 45:16 (LP)
- Label: Estrus Records

Man or Astro-man? chronology
Possession by Remote Control (1992)	Is It ... Man Or Astroman? (1993)	Amazing Thrills! in 3-Dimension (1993)

Professional ratings
Review scores
Source	Rating
Allmusic	4.5/5 stars

Is It ... Man or Astroman? is the first album released by the surf rock group Man or Astro-man?. First pressing was on clear blue vinyl; all subsequent pressings were on black vinyl. In deference to "vinyl junkies", the vinyl release sports two additional tracks. "Illudium Q-36" references the Chuck Jones character, Marvin the Martian. The title refers to the weapon of choice of the hostile Looney Tunes alien. The cover art was painted by American science fiction and fantasy illustrator Richard Powers

== Track listing ==
=== CD release ===
1. "Taxidermist Surf" – 2:53
2. "Invasion of the Dragonmen" – 2:15
3. "Nitrous Burn Out" – 3:17
4. "Clean up on Aisle #9 (Turn up the Monitors)" – 2:35
5. "Journey to the Stars" (The Ventures) – 2:28
6. "Cowboy Playing Dead" – 1:55
7. "Sadie Hawkins Atom Bomb" – 2:46
8. "The Human Calculator" – 2:56
9. "Organ Smash" – 1:46
10. "Cattle Drive" – 2:51
11. "Escape Through the Air Vent" – 2:23
12. "Mermaid Love" – 3:21
13. "Eric Estrotica" – 3:23
14. "Alien Visitors" – 6:54

=== Vinyl release ===
1. "Taxidermist Surf" – 2:53
2. "Invasion of the Dragonmen" – 2:15
3. "Nitrous Burn Out" – 3:17
4. "Clean up on Aisle #9 (Turn up the Monitors)" – 2:35
5. "Journey to the Stars" (The Ventures) – 2:28
6. "Cowboy Playing Dead" – 1:55
7. "Illidium Q-36" [bonus track] – 1:08
8. "Sadie Hawkins Atom Bomb" – 2:46
9. "The Human Calculator" – 2:56
10. "Organ Smash" – 1:46
11. "Cattle Drive" – 2:51
12. "Escape Through the Air Vent" – 2:23
13. "Rudy's Lounge" [bonus track] – 2:24
14. "Mermaid Love" – 3:21
15. "Eric Estrotica" – 3:23
16. "Alien Visitors" – 6:54

== Man or Astro-Man? could be ==
- Star Crunch: guitar, laserguns, Q-Tips and rare obligatory vocals
- Dr. Deleto & His Invisible Vaportron: bass, sterilized rhythm guitar, malpractice suits, and the two-step
- Coco, The Electronic Monkey Wizard: alternate universe bass, percussion, banana consumption, sound bites of lower primate love, hand held view master, VCR ignition, bunny control, foreign language count-offs, and yelps of intense pain given to him, sometimes in punishment
- Birdstuff: hi-hat
- Grand Master Useless: imitation ivory ticklin' on Organ Smash, bass on Sadie Hawkins Atomic Bomb and Illidium Q-36

This, in turn, translates to:

- Brian Causey: lead guitar, items, vocals (Mermaid Love)
- Jeff Goodwin: bass guitar, rhythm guitar, items
- Robert Del Bueno: bass guitar, percussion, items, sound effects
- Brian Teasley: drums
- Dave Strength: keyboards (Organ Smash), bass (Sadie Hawkins Atomic Bomb, Illidium Q-36)

== Also credited ==
B-movie actor John Agar is credited "because his name is in everything else".

== Audio samples ==
Alien Visitors contains dialogue audio samples from the b-movies Earth vs. the Flying Saucers, Plan 9 from Outer Space, and the television series The Outer Limits. Nitrous Burn Out contains dialogue from the movies Viva Knievel! and Death Race 2000.
