= Project Infinity =

Studio album by Man or Astro-man?
- Released: 1995
- Genre: Surf rock
- Length: 57:49
- Label: Estrus
- Producer: Steve Albini

Man or Astro-man? chronology
Live Transmissions from Uranus (1995)	Project Infinity (1995)	Two Blood-Soaked Space-Horror Hits!! (1995)

Professional ratings
Review scores
Source	Rating
AllMusic	3/5 stars

Project Infinity is the second full-length studio album by Man or Astro-man?. The cover is a reworking of Attilio Mineo's Man in Space with Sounds, which was used as the soundtrack to the futuristic "Bubbleator" exhibit at the 1962 Century 21 Exposition (Seattle World's Fair).

== Track listing ==
1. "Escape Velocity" – 2:22
2. "Sferic Waves" – 2:47
3. "---------- (Classified)" – 1:57
4. "Transmissions From Venus" – 2:25
5. "Max Q" – 3:11
6. "Inside The Atom" – 2:10
7. "Philip K. Dick In The Pet Section Of A Wal-Mart" – 1:56
8. "Put Your Finger In The Socket" – 2:51
9. "Complex 34" – 2:17
10. "The Man From U.N.C.L.E." – 1:34
11. "Tomorrow Plus X" – 3:51
12. "Manta Ray" (originally by the Pixies) – 2:18
13. "Point Blank" – 2:58
14. "Special Agent Conrad Uno" – 3:05
15. "Alpha Surfari" – 2:07
16. "Mach One" (Vinyl-only bonus track) – 2:16
