= What Remains Inside a Black Hole =

Compilation album by Man or Astro-man?
- Released: 1996
- Genre: Surf rock
- Length: 38:39
- Label: Au-Go-Go Records

Man or Astro-man? chronology
Intravenous Television Continuum (1996)	What Remains Inside a Black Hole (1996)	Experiment Zero (1996)

Professional ratings
Review scores
Source	Rating
AllMusic	3/5 stars

What Remains Inside a Black Hole is a Man or Astro-man? compilation album. It features tracks that originally appeared on 7-inch EPs. It was released in Australia on Au-Go-Go Records and remains difficult to find in the US. In 2001, Estrus Records released a compilation entitled Beyond the Black Hole, which features many of the same songs.

== Track listing ==
1. "The Universe's Only Intergalactic Radioactive Breakfast Bar" – 1:53charles
2. "The Quatermass Phenomenon" – 2:56
3. "Eric Estrotica (Live in Space)" – 3:26
4. "War of the Satellites" (The Ventures) – 2:07
5. "Rovers" – 2:11
6. "24 Hours" – 2:20
7. "Squad Car (Live in Space)" (Eddie & the Showmen) – 2:05
8. "Surf Terror" – 2:55
9. "Transmissions from Venus" – 2:38
10. "Reverb 1000" – 2:08
11. "Caffeine Trip" – 2:52
12. "Polaris" – 3:23
13. "Adios Johnny Bravo" – 3:36
14. "The Vortex Beyond" – 2:23
15. "Within a Martian Heart" – 1:46
