= Beyond the Black Hole =

Compilation album by Man or Astro-man?
- Released: 2001
- Genre: Surf rock
- Label: Estrus Records

Man or Astro-man? chronology
A Spectrum of Finite Scale (2001)	Beyond the Black Hole (2001)	Earth Station Radio/Updated Theme From Supercar (2010)

Professional ratings
Review scores
Source	Rating
Allmusic	link
Kerrang!	3/5 stars

Beyond the Black Hole is a Man or Astro-man? compilation featuring tracks that originally appeared on 7-inch EPs. It was released in 2001 on Estrus Records. This release features many of the same songs that were featured on the 1997 Australia-only release What Remains Inside a Black Hole.

== Track listing ==
1. "The Wayward Meteor" – 2:56
2. "Rovers" – 2:11
3. "The Quatermass Phenomena" – 2:57
4. "Polaris" – 3:23
5. "The Vortex Beyond" – 2:21
6. "24 Hrs. - 2:23
7. "Surf Terror" – 2:55
8. "The Powerful Fully-Transistorized Dick Tracy Two-Way Wrist Radio" – 1:46
9. "Reverb 1000" – 2:08
10. "Transmissions from Venus" – 2:39
11. "Green-Blooded Love" – 1:15
12. "Within a Martian Heart" – 1:43
