= Enrichment Center Percussion Ensemble =

Musical group

The Enrichment Center Percussion Ensemble, based in Winston-Salem, North Carolina, is part of the Enrichment Center, which supports adults with intellectual and developmental disabilities. The ensemble has gained recognition for its unique performances, both locally and nationally, under the direction of Aaron Bachelder. This group has performed in various locations, including notable events in New York, and produces original music using creative methods to accommodate the varying abilities of its members. The ensemble has made several recordings and continues to inspire audiences through their innovative musical expression..

The group began performing and was soon attracting the attention of many in the arts and human services communities. Before long, they had performed for thousands of people, alone and in collaboration with such groups as The African American Dance Ensemble, Chimaera Physical Theatre, and more recently, The Open Dream Ensemble. The group's music is highly varied, ranging from neo-serialism to post- minimalist rock, as well as arrangements of American folk song and works drawing on Asian, Latin, and jazz traditions. Their first recording (Nomos), a collaboration with violinist Sarah Johnson on her CD Fiddler's Galaxy, was released in 2000 on Albany Records, and subsequently premiered live at the Southeastern Center for Contemporary Art (SECCA). Their CD Three Pieces was released in 2005 on Microearth Records , with guest musicians Morgan Kraft, Erich Hubner of Man or Astro-man?, and Joel Lambdin, founder of the Harrisburg Chamber Players. It has received airplay on regional college radio, and a portion of the opening track "Parallax" was used in a television commercial for SECCA. Their performance of "Wintersong" by Bachelder was included on the recent WUAG (University of North Carolina at Greensboro) live compilation "18 watts is better than none". As Ken Keuffel, in the Winston-Salem Journal, says, "[the] Ensemble illustrates the power of music".

Erich Hubner engineered the live recordings done at the Enrichment Center on 16 track tape for the 2008 release "Ten Songs." The tapes were then taken and mixed by legendary NC musician Mitch Easter at his Fidelitorium Studio.

== Guest musicians ==
- Aaron Bachelder
- Morgan Kraft
- Erich Hubner
- Joel Lambdin
- Sarah Johnson
- Jeffrey Dean Foster

== Discography ==
- "Nomos" featured on Fiddler's Galaxy Sarah Johnson Albany Records, 2000
- Three Pieces released on Microearth Records, 2005
- Ten Songs released by Microearth Records 2008
