= The Sounds of Tomorrow =

EP by Man or Astro-man?
- Released: 1996
- Recorded: Zero Return 1995
- Genre: Surf rock
- Label: Estrus Records

Man or Astro-man? chronology
Deluxe Men in Space (1996)	The Sounds of Tomorrow (1996)	Gearhead Magazine Insert (1996)

The Sounds of Tomorrow is a Man or Astro-man? 7-inch EP released on Estrus Records in 1996. It was released on both black vinyl and gray vinyl.

== Unit Test Tracks ==
=== Test A ===
- "The Evil Sounds of Planet Spectra"
- "The Wayward Meteor"

=== Test B ===
- "Green-Blooded Love" (Thee Shatners)
- "The Powerful Fully-Transisitorized Dick Tracy Two-Way Wrist Radio"

== Line Up ==
- Star Crunch: inner mind multi-wave guitar vibration
- Birdstuff: tempomatic rythmo-lock
- Coco the Electronic Monkey Wizard: distortomated mega frequency lo-out, transmonosonic impedance overload
- Dexter X - Man from Planet Q: Vacuum silence
