= Man or Astro-man? =

American surf rock group

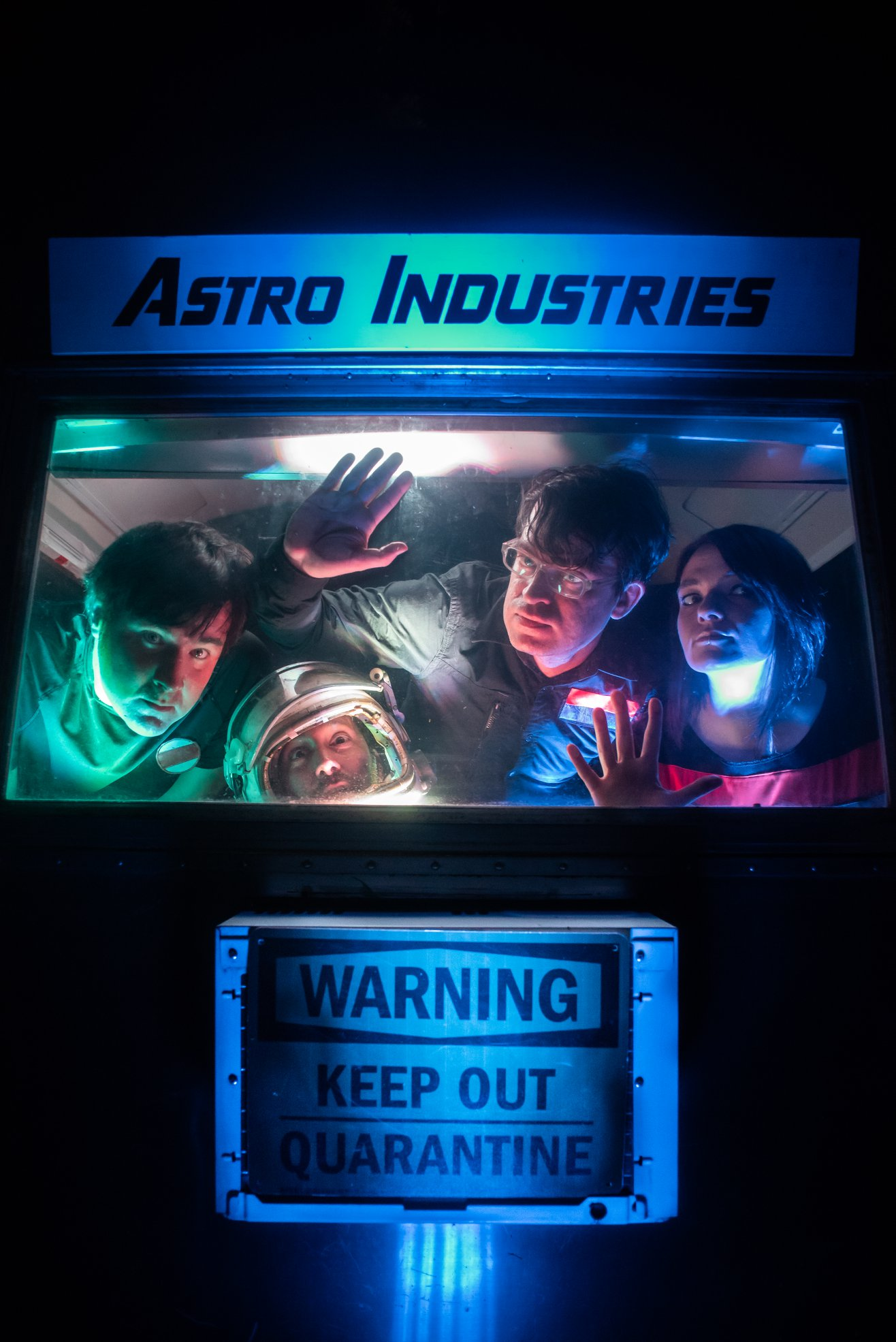
- Man or Astro-man?

Background information
- Origin: Auburn, Alabama, United States
- Genres: Indie rock; garage rock; punk rock; surf rock; psychedelic rock; space rock; electronic rock
- Years active: 1992–present
- Labels: Estrus, Au Go Go, One Louder, Touch and Go, Sympathy for the Record Industry, Lance Rock
- Members: Brian "Birdstuff" Teasley; Brian "Star Crunch" Causey; Robert "Coco the Electronic Monkey Wizard" del Bueno; Samantha "Avona Nova" Paulsen
- Past members: Dave "Grand Master Useless" Strength; Jeff "Dr. Deleto" Goodwin; Jason "Cap'n Zeno" Russell; Hayden "Dexter X" Thais; Erich "Trace Reading" Hubner; Richie "Blazar the Probe Handler" Edelson; Jonny "Victor Vector" Browning

Man or Astro-man? is an American surf rock group that was formed in Auburn, Alabama in the early 1990s and came to prominence over the following decade.

Primarily instrumental, Man or Astro-man? blended the surf rock style of the early 1960s, like that of Dick Dale and The Spotnicks with the new wave and punk rock sounds of the late 1970s and early 1980s. Man or Astro-man? was known for their anachronistic dedication to science fiction themes, audio samples, obscure electronic devices (such as theremins and tesla coils), and high-energy live performances. Their earlier albums like Is It ... Man or Astroman? and Destroy All Astromen! were known for their traditional surf rock instrumentation and sci-fi sound bite song introductions, whereas their later albums like EEVIAC... and A Spectrum of Infinite Scale were known for their use of synthesizers, printers (like the Apple ImageWriter II), and their more abstract, experimental sound. Their recordings were often peppered with sound bites from obscure science fiction films and TV shows.

It is largely believed that the group took its name from the poster of the U.S. release of the Japanese film The Human Vapor, which includes the tagline "IS HE MAN OR ASTRO-MAN?", the line seemingly appropriated as the title of their first album, Is It ... Man or Astroman?.

== Members ==
The main members of the band are Star Crunch (a.k.a. Brian Causey) on guitar and sometimes vocals, Birdstuff (a.k.a. Brian Teasley) on drums, and Coco the Electronic Monkey Wizard (Robert DelBueno) on bass guitar and electronics. The band included various other guitarists over the years, including Grand Master Useless (real name unknown, possibly Dave Strength), Dr. Deleto (Jeff Goodwin), Cap'n Zeno (Jason Russell), and Dexter X (Hayden Thais). In 1998, Star Crunch left the band to run a record label (Athens, Georgia-based WARM Electronic Recordings) and was replaced by Trace Reading (Erich Hubner) and Blazar the Probe Handler (Richie Edelson). Although the real names of the band members are known, the band members themselves have never publicly acknowledged their true identities, and steadfastly claim to be extraterrestrials sent to Earth to play surf music. Birdstuff also played drums in Servotron under the name Z4-OBX and in The Causey Way as Boy Causey. He has also played with St. Vincent, Sound of Humans, and The Polyphonic Spree. Before joining up with the Astromen, Dexter X had played in Supernova. He was also a member of Servotron under the name 00zX1. After leaving MOAM?, Dr. Deleto played with the Immortal Lee County Killers.

The original lineup of the band (Star Crunch, Birdstuff, and Coco) have reunited for shows that started in March 2010. 2nd guitar was handled by Victor Vector (Jonny Browning), who has played in Sound of Humans (also with Birdstuff), as well as Jonny and the Shamen and The Other Timelines, until early 2011 when he fell ill and became too sick to play. Since Victor Vector's departure, Avona Nova (Samantha Erin Paulsen, former guitarist/vocalist for We Versus The Shark), the first female member of the band, has been performing as 2nd guitarist. During their 2013 tour in Europe, Josh Lambert and Yvonne Lambert of The Octopus Project assisted them occasionally, as Coco the Electronic Monkey Wizard was unavailable due to the recent birth of his child.

== History ==
Man or Astro-man recorded ten albums between 1993 and 2001 (including the tour-only release A Spectrum of Finite Scale), as well as two CD EPs, and a plethora of singles and contributions to various artists compilation albums. Many of the singles were available on multiple colors of vinyl, some with as many as six variations (see Inside the Head of... Mr. Atom). Their 2001 release, Beyond the Black Hole, was a remixed version of one of their earlier albums, What Remains Inside a Black Hole.

When the band was not in the recording studio, they were usually on the road, gigging almost constantly. Their live shows were notable for their sci-fi theatrics: all members of the band dressed in space age jumpsuits, and often included elaborate sci-fi set pieces.

Although they often receive credit for the theme song to Space Ghost Coast to Coast, it was actually recorded by Sonny Sharrock. The confusion arises because they recorded the show's closing theme and some new interstitial music which all first appeared in the 1997 season, as well as an alternate opening theme that appeared once, but not the more familiar theme song. Also, after his departure from the band in 1998, guitarist/vocalist Star Crunch (a.k.a. Brian Causey) would go on to compose and perform the theme song for the popular Nickelodeon TV series, The Adventures of Jimmy Neutron.

Eventually, the constant workload of recording and touring caught up with them, and, after the tour for A Spectrum of Infinite Scale ended in 2001, the band began a long hiatus. On June 12, 2006, the band's label Touch and Go Records announced that Man or Astro-man? would be performing for the first time since 2001 at the Touch and Go 25th Anniversary Celebration in Chicago, Illinois, on September 9. They took the stage during the time slot in between Scratch Acid and Big Black, on what was the second day of the three-day festival. The complete original line-up played, and the tesla coil was brought up on stage at the end of the set. The 45-minute show ended with Birdstuff giving away most of his drumset to stunned audience members. In preparation for the Touch and Go reunion show, the band played on September 6 at the Bottletree Café in Birmingham, Alabama. This show featured Birdstuff, Coco the Electric Monkey Wizard, Star Crunch and Dr. Deleto. Additionally, Captain Zeno performed on one song, resulting in a 5-piece Man or Astroman? performance. These were the first shows since 1998 to feature the original line-up of the band.

On January 20, 2010, it was announced that Man or Astro-man? would be performing at Whirly Ball in Atlanta, Georgia on March 5 and The Bottletree in Birmingham, Alabama on March 6, as well as multiple SXSW dates. In June 2010, Man or Astro-man? played the NXNE festival in Toronto, Canada, with performances at the Horseshoe Tavern (June 19, 2010) and Sneaky Dees (June 20, 2010).

Their ninth album Defcon 5...4...3...2...1 came out, as digital download, on April 24, 2013, a 12 track LP with familiar sounds from 1000X and EEVIAC.

== The Astro-man Genome Project ==
=== Alpha Clones ===
In 1998 Man or Astro-man? sent a group of "clones" out on the road to tour. The clones had names similar to their original counterparts: Birdstuff became Dorkstuff, Coco became Cocoid, Star Crunch became Chromo Crunch and Dexter X became Dexter Y. This new line-up toured under the name "Man or Astro-man Clone Tour Alpha" and maintained their clone identities while on stage. Members of the Alpha clones were also in numerous other bands including Toenut, The Causey Way, Jonny and the Shamen, The Man Made Brain, Sound of Humans, Neutronic, Pilot Scott Tracy, The Plastic Plan, etc.

=== Gamma Clones ===
After the success of the Alpha Project, Man or Astro-man? "cloned" themselves a second time, in 1999, this time using women, who adopted the names Coco Active (Guitarist/Vocalist Shonali Bhowmik), Chromia Staria (Guitarist/Vocalist Deb Davis), Tweety-Tone (Drummer/Vocalist Ani Cordero), and Carol (Guitarist/Vocalist Shannon Wright), and toured nationally under the name "Man or Astro-man? Clone Project Gamma."

== Man or Astro-man? and Mystery Science Theater 3000 ==
The band covered the Mystery Science Theater 3000 "love theme". It was released on Amazing Thrills! in 3-Dimension and later on the album Destroy All Astromen! and was also performed live. MST3K creator Joel Hodgson joined them on stage to sing the theme at a show in 1996, and Joel's character on MST3K later claimed to have toured in Australia with Man or Astro-man? doing pyrotechnics for the band.

Man or Astro-man? recordings regularly feature audio samples taken from films riffed on MST3K (ex. The Leech Woman, It Conquered the World and Santa Claus) and the albums often make allusions to common themes and running jokes (ex. album credits for John Agar in Is It ... Man or Astroman? and Peter Graves and Richard Basehart in Destroy All Astromen!).

Man or Astro-man? guitarist Hayden Thais (Dexter X) and drummer Brian Teasley (Birdstuff) were also members of the "all-robot band" Servotron, which was named for MST3K robot character Tom Servo. A handbill for at least one concert has featured an image of the robot puppet.

== Discography ==
=== Studio albums ===
- Is It ... Man or Astroman? LP/CD (Estrus Records – 1993)
- Project Infinity LP/CD (Estrus Records – 1995)
- Experiment Zero LP/CD (Touch & Go Records – 1996)
- Made from Technetium LP/CD (Touch & Go Records, One Louder, and Au-Go-Go Records, 1997)
- EEVIAC Operational Index and Reference Guide, Including Other Modern Computational Devices LP/CD (Epitaph Europe and Touch & Go Records – 1999)
- A Spectrum of Infinite Scale 2x10"/CD (Epitaph Europe and Touch & Go Records – 2000)
- A Spectrum of Finite Scale Tour-Only CD (Zerotec – 2001)
- Defcon 5...4...3...2...1 LP/CD (Warm Electronic Recordings/Chunklet Industries – 2013)

=== Live albums ===
- Live Transmissions from Uranus LP-picture disc/CD (One Louder Records – 1995), LP/CD (Homo Habilis Records – 1995), CD (US reissue: Touch & Go Records – 1997)
- Live at Third Man Records (Third Man Records – 2017)

=== Compilation albums ===
- Destroy All Astromen! LP/CD (Estrus Records – 1994)
- What Remains Inside a Black Hole LP/CD (Au-Go-Go Records – 1996)
- Intravenous Television Continuum LP/CD (One Louder Records – 1996) CD (Australian reissue: Au-Go-Go Records – 1997)
- Beyond the Black Hole CD (Estrus Records – 2001)

=== EPs and singles ===
- Possession by Remote Control7-inch (Homo Habilis records – 1992)
- Supersonic Toothbrush Helmet 7-inch (Lance Rock Records – 1993)
- Amazing Thrills! in 3-Dimension 7-inch (Estrus Records – 1993)
- Captain Holojoy's Space Diner 7-inch (Lucky Records – 1993)
- Mission into Chaos! 7-inch (One Louder Records – 1993)
- Man or Astro-man? vs. Europa 7-inch (Homo Habilis Records – 1993)
- Astro Launch 7-inch (Estrus Records – 1994)
- The Brains of the Cosmos 7-inch (Demolition Derby Records – 1994)
- Inside the Head of... Mr. Atom 7-inch (Estrus Records – 1994)
- Creature Feature flexi 7-inch with Monster Magazine.
- No. 4/Highball Magazine
- No. 2 (Kronophonic Records – 1994)
- Your Weight on the Moon 10-inch/CD EP (One Louder Records – 1994)
- Return to Chaos 7-inch (Homo Habilis and One Louder – 1995)
- Man or Astro-man? in Orbit 7-inch (Shake It Records – 1995)
- Postphonic Star Exploration 5" (Sympathy for the Record Industry – 1995)
- Needles in the Cosmic Haystack 7-inch (East Side Records – 1995)
- World Out of Mind! 7-inch (Estrus Records – 1995)
- Espanto del Futuro 7-inch (Fear and Loathin Records – 1995)
- Welcome to the Sonic Space Age 7-inch (Clawfist Records – 1995)
- Deluxe Men in Space 7-inch/CDS (Touch & Go Records and One Louder – 1996)
- The Sounds of Tomorrow 7-inch (Estrus Records – 1996)
- UFO's and the Men Who Fly Them! 7-inch (Drug Racer Records – 1996)
- 1000X 10-inch/CD EP (Touch & Go Records and One Louder – 1997)
- Inside the Head of John Peel Bootleg 2×7″ (Astro-Fonic Records – 1997)
- Ex Machina 7-inch (Touch & Go Records – 1998)
- Cuts and Volts/Draining Their Batteries 1998
- Earth Station Radio/Updated Theme From Supercar 7-inch with first 300 copies of the book "Touchable Sound: A Collection of 7-inch Records from the USA" (Soundscreen Design – 2010)
- Analog Series Vol. 1 7-inch Clear (limited edition first 200 copies), orange (limited edition Chunklet exclusive), red (first repress), gold (second repress) or black Vinyl (Chunklet Magazine web site – 2012)
- Analog Series Vol. 2 7-inch Clear (limited edition first 200 copies), green (limited edition Chunklet exclusive), red (first repress) or black Vinyl (Chunklet Magazine web site – 2012)
- Analog Series Vol. 3 7-inch Clear (limited edition first 200 copies), purple (limited edition Chunklet exclusive) or black Vinyl (Chunklet Magazine web site – 2013)
- Space 1991 7-inch (Chunklet Magazine – 2021)
- Distant Pulsar 7-inch (Chunklet Magazine – 2022)

=== Splits ===
- 7" with Teenage Caveman Kill Geeksville (Worry Bird Records – 1994)
- 7" with Huevos Rancheros The Various Boss Sounds from Beyond the Far Reaches... and Then Some! (Get Hip Records – 1994)
- 7" with Girls Against Boys Cheap Sweaty Fun & TJ's Xmas (Unknown record label – 1994)
- 7" with Anachronauts Disjointed Parallels (Eerie Materials – 1995)
- 7" with Chrome Gearhead Magazine Insert (Gearhead – 1996)
- 7" with Pavement Schoolhouse Rock! Rocks (Atlantic Records/Lava Records – 1996)
- 7" with Jonny and the Shamen Two Blood-Soaked Space-Horror Hits!! (Loch Ness Records – 1999)

=== Compilation tracks ===
- "Reverb 1000" on Call of the Wild Flexi 7-inch (Call of the Wild – 1993)
- "Transmission from Venus" on Stock Footage: Music from the Films of Roger Corman CD (Worry Bird Records – 1994)
- "Deuces Wild" on Think Link! 10-inch (Drink 'n' Drive Records – 1994)
- "Everybody's Favourite Martian" on Hodge Podge & Barrage from Japan Vol.2 CD (1+2 Records – 1994)
- "Nitrous Burnout 2112" on Beyond the Beach CD (Upstart Records – 1994)
- "Frosty the Snowman" on Happy Birthday, Baby Jesus Vol.2 10-inch (Sympathy for the Record Industry – 1994)
- "Frosty the Snowman" on Happy Birthday, Baby Jesus Vols.1&2 CD (Sympathy for the Record Industry – 1994)
- "Mr. Goodchoices Meat Packing Accident" on Good Tyme Jamboree LP (Planet Pimp Records – 1994)
- "Eric Estrotica (live at Leadmill)" on Saturday Night Special 7-inch (Leadmill Records – 1995)
- "The Carbonated Comet" on The Estrus Cocktail Companion 3×7″/box CD (Estrus Records – 1995)
- "Goldfinger" on Secret Agent S.O.U.N.D.S. LP/CD (Mai Tai – 1995)
- "Earth Station Radio" on Jabberjaw No. 6 Pure Sweet Hell 4×7″/box CD (Mammoth Records – 1996)
- "Maximum Radiation Level" on For Discriminating Tastes (The Alternative Distribution Alliance – 1996)
- "Escape Velocity" on Five Ring Circus CD (Flip Records – 1996)
- "Eisenhower & the Hippies" (UJ3RK5 cover) on Oh Canaduh! LP/CD (Lance Rock – 1996)
- "Interplanet Janet" on Schoolhouse Rock! Rocks LP/CD/CS (WEA/Atlantic Records – 1996)
- "Touch of Evil" on Shots in the Dark 2×LP/CD (Del-Fi – 1996)
- "Reverb 1000 (live)" on Cowabunga! The Surf Box 4×CD (Rhino Records – 1996)
- "Intoxica" on Instrumental Fire, a Collection of Instros from Around the Planet and Beyond LP (MuSick – 1996)
- "----- (Classified) (live)" on Treble Revolution Vol.2 CD (Kindercore Records- 1996)
- "Joker's Wild (live)" on Attaining the Supreme CD (Whirled Records – 1996)
- "Drumulator Is Boss" on Flaming Burnout! An Estrus Benefit Comp CD (Man's Ruin Records – 1997)
- "The Sound Waves Reversing" on Good Health, Good Fortune, Good Music CD (Au Go Go Records – 1997)
- "Lo-Bat" on Touch & Go and Quarterstick Records 1997 sampler CD (Touch & Go/Quarterstick Records – 1997)
- "Planet Collision (Trans Hip-APhonic Post Acid Flip Trance Mega Blast Alterno-Universe Mass Marketing Schtick Mix)" on The Money Shot CD (Chunklet Magazine insert – 1997)
- "24 Hrs." on Live at WREK. – 91.1fm 1997 Atlanta Radio Comp CD (1997)
- "Updated Theme to Supercar" on All Punk Rods! LP/CD (Gearhead/Lookout! Records – 1998)
- "Tazerguns Mean Big Fun" on Chairman of the Board Soundtrack CD (Virgin Records – 1998)
- "Synthesis of Previously Unknown Substances" on Hang 10, Volume One CD (American Pop Project Records – 2000)
- "Floatation Devices for Frequencies Yet to Be Detected" on Surf Monsters CD (Del-Fi Records – 1999)
- "Escape Velocity" on 26 Spicey Sizzlers CD (Estrus Records – 1999)
- "Manta Ray" (Pixies cover) on Southern Edge Vol. 1 CD (Beloved – 1999)
- "Yo Yo's Pad" on Delphonic Sounds Today CD (Del-Fi Records – 1999)
- "Theme from EEVIAC" on Cinema Beer Belly CD (Hopeless Records – 1999)
- "Lo-Bat" on Athfest '98 CD (Ghostmeat – 1999)
- "400,000.37 Miles (Breaking The Sanity Barrier)" on Runnin' on Fumes CD (Gearhead – 2000)
- "Wayward Meteor" and "Electrostatic Brain Field" on The Estrus Double Dynomite Sampler Volume 3 CD (Estrus Records – 2002)
- "War of the Satellites" on Their Sympathetic Majesties Request: Volume 2 2×CD (Sympathy for the Record Industry – 2003)
- "Jonathan Winter's Frankenstein" on "BBC Sessions Covers" (incorrectly identified on track listing as a cover of the "Edgar Winter Group"'s track "Frankenstein")
