= Jonny Browning =

American instrumental surf musician

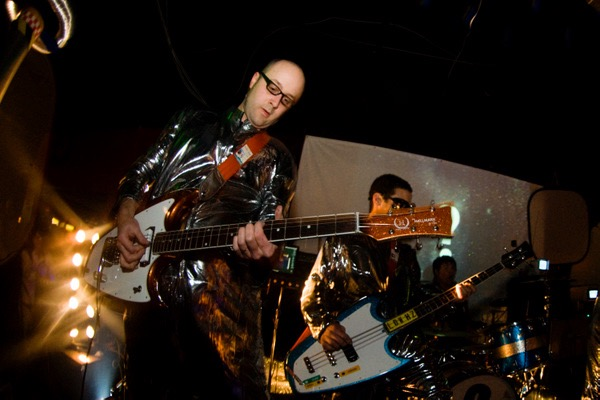
Victor Vector with Man or Astro-Man? circa 2010 by Mike White

Jonny Browning is an American instrumental surf musician, primarily known as touring guitarist Victor Vector for the band Man or Astro-Man? Prior to his performing in the band, he also played the part of Chromo-Crunch in Man or Astro-Man?: Clone Project Alpha in 1997-1998. He has played guitar and written songs for Sound of Humans (also featuring Birdstuff of Man or Astro-Man?), Jonny and the Shamen, and The Man Made Brain. He currently plays guitar and writes for Canadian instrumental surf band The Other Timelines. He has also composed additional music for the Daryl Stoneage documentary Genius Factory (2017). He was born and raised in Alabama and has resided in Vancouver, BC since 2009.

== Discography ==
=== Albums ===
- Operation:Twang! CD by Jonny and the Shamen (Loch Ness Records - 1997)
- The Fully Functional Adventures in Espionage Video Game CD by Jonny and the Shamen (Turducken Recordings - 1999)
- Vector-Based Fiction 7"/CD by The Man Made Brain (Altaira Records - 2000)
- Sound of Humans CD by Sound of Humans (Altaira Records - 2014)
- The Other Timelines 7"/CD/Cassette by The Other Timelines (Double Crown Records - 2015)

=== Singles ===
- Two Blood-Soaked Space-Horror Hits!! Split 7" by Jonny and the Shamen and Man or Astro-Man? (Loch Ness Records - 1999)

=== Compilation Tracks ===
- "It's So Easy" by Jonny and the Shamen on Takin' Out The Trash: A Tribute to The Trashmen CD (Double Crown Records - 1999)
- "S.P.E.C.T.R.E. Girl" by Jonny and the Shamen on Swivlin' Wahine CD (Skully Records - 2000)
- "It's So Easy (instro)" by Jonny and the Shamen on War of the Surf Guitars! CD (Double Crown Records - 2002)

=== Live ===
- Daytrotter Session by Man or Astro-Man? (2010)
