= UFO's and the Men Who Fly Them! =

EP by Man or Astro-man?
- Released: 1996
- Recorded: 25 June 1996
- Studio: Zero Return
- Genre: Surf rock
- Label: Drug Racer Records

Man or Astro-man? chronology
| Schoolhouse Rock! Rocks (1996) | UFO's and the Men Who Fly Them! (1996) | Intravenous Television Continuum (1996) |

UFO's and the Men Who Fly Them! is a 1996 Man or Astro-man? 7-inch EP released jointly by Jezz Thorpe (Drug Racer) and Henry Owings of Chunklet (magazine) on Drug Racer Records. It was released on gray vinyl, anti-freeze green vinyl, red vinyl and black vinyl—with red being the rarest (only 100 pressed). The EP was recorded at Zero Return Studios in Wetumpka, AL.

This single featured a die-cut sleeve that unfolded to reveal a punch-out "flying saucer disc" (assembled in 5 easy steps). The punch-out and assemble UFO led to many a damaged picture sleeve, making the procurement of a mint copy of this record even more difficult.

== Track listing ==
=== Drug Side ===
- "9-Volt (Rechargeable Version)"
- "The Sound Waves, Reversing"

=== Racer Side ===
- "Italian Movie Theme"
- "High Wire"
