= Destroy All Astromen! =

Compilation album by Man or Astro-man?
- Released: 1994
- Genre: Surf rock
- Label: Estrus

Man or Astro-man? chronology
The Brains of the Cosmos (1994)	Destroy All Astromen! (1994)	Your Weight on the Moon (1994)

Professional ratings
Review scores
Source	Rating
AllMusic	3/5 stars

Destroy All Astromen! is a compilation album by the surf rock group Man or Astro-man?. Often cited as their second album, it is actually a compilation of tracks that appeared on 7"s recorded the previous year (1993). The first pressing was a limited red vinyl pressing of 200 copies.

== Track listing ==
1. "Reverb 10,000"
2. "Name of Numbers"
3. "Popcorn Crabula"
4. "A Mouthful of Exhaust"
5. "Of Sex and Demise"
6. "Joker's Wild" (The Ventures)
7. "Intoxica" (The Revels)
8. "Mystery Meat"
9. "The Heavies (Let's Surf the River of Blood)" (The Ventures)
10. "Madness in the Streets"
11. "Espanto del Futuro"
12. "Mystery Science Theater 3000 Love Theme" (Hodgson, Weinstein, Erikson)
13. "Landlocked"
14. "Bombora" (The Surfaris)
15. "Gargantua's Last Stand"
16. "You Can't Get Good Riblets in Space"
17. "Bermuda Triangle Shorts"
18. "Taco Wagon" (Dick Dale)
19. "The Vortex Beyond"
20. "Out of Limits"* (M. Gordon)
21. "Destination Venus" (The Rezillos)
22. "Time Bomb"
23. "The Shadow Knows"* (Wray, Fredericks)

*Vinyl-only bonus tracks
