= Welcome to the Sonic Space Age =

EP by Man or Astro-man?
- Released: 1995
- Recorded: Bang Bang Studios, 1995
- Genre: Surf rock
- Label: Clawfist Records

Man or Astro-man? chronology
Espanto del Futuro (1995)	Welcome to the Sonic Space Age (1995)	Live Transmissions from Uranus (1995)

Welcome to the Sonic Space Age is a Man or Astro-man? 7-inch EP released on Clawfist Records in 1995 and pressed exclusively on black vinyl.

== Track listing ==
=== Side Y ===
- "King of the Monsters"

=== Side Z ===
- "Bird's Stuff" (The Motivations)

== Line Up ==
- Star Crunch: Guitarimation
- Captain Zeno: Subordinate Guitarimation on "King", Bassotron on "Bird's Stuff"
- Birdstuff: Drumomatics
- CoCo: Bassotron on "King", Thereminiting on "Bird's Stuff"
