= Man or Astro-man? vs. Europa =

EP by Man or Astro-man?
- Released: 1993
- Recorded: Zero Return 10/17/93
- Genre: Surf rock
- Label: Homo-Habilis Records

Man or Astro-man? chronology
| Mission into Chaos! (1993) | Man or Astro-man? vs. Europa (1993) | Kill Geeksville (1994) |

Man or Astro-man? vs. Europa (subtitled "Four Week-Kneed Space Geeks Take on an Entire Continent!") is a Man or Astro-man? 7-inch EP released on Homo-Habilis Records (HH706) in late 1993. It was only pressed on black vinyl, and the turquoise, card-stock picture sleeve folded in such a way as to leave half of the record exposed on the reverse side:

back of single

The single was made to be sold on their first European tour—a tour titled "Invasion of the Astro-Men!" that lasted from December 14, 1993, to January 11, 1994.

Studio tracks were recorded 10/17/93 at Zero Return studios.

== Track listing ==
=== Side A ===
1. "Popcorn Crabula"
2. "Intoxica"

=== Side B ===
1. "Squad Car" (live)
2. "Eric Estrotica" (live)
