= Whirlyball 7″ =

Whirlyball 7"

EP by Deerhunter/The Selmanaires/Carbonas/The Coathangers
- Released: 2007
- Genre: Indie rock
- Label: Chunklet

"Whirlyball 7"" is a split EP released in May 2007, featuring songs from four bands from Atlanta, Georgia. The record was released by Chunklet magazine and served as a ticket to a concert featuring Deerhunter, The Selmanaires, Carbonas and The Coathangers. The record was only available at Atlanta's Criminal Records record store. The concert took place on June 1, 2007 at Roswell, Georgia. After the show, due to popular demand, the EP was available to purchase online, but only 100 copies on black vinyl and 100 on clear vinyl were available. There was a brief repress where some number of blue colored vinyl was pressed.

== Track listing ==
=== Side A - "Side Whirly" ===
1. "Blue Ruse" - The Selmanaires
2. "Kousin Klash" - Deerhunter

=== Side B - "Side Ball" ===
1. "Look Around (I Was So Upset)" - Carbonas (originally by Hubble Bubble)
2. "Nestle In My Boobies" - The Coathangers

== Personnel ==
The Selmanaires

- Herb Harris - guitar, vocals, percussion, drums
- Jason Harris - drums, vocals, wurlitzer electric piano, sampler, stand-up bass, percussion
- Tommy Chung - bass, vocals, guitar, percussion, stand-up bass
- Mathis Hunter - percussions, guitar, sampler, drums

Deerhunter

- Bradford Cox - vocals
- Moses Archuleta - drums
- Justin Bosworth - bass
- Colin Mee - guitar

Carbonas

- Greg King - vocals
- Dave Rahn - drums
- Jesse Smith - bass
- Josh Martin - lead guitar
- Clay Kilborne - rhythm guitar

The Coathangers

- The Crook Kid Coathanger - vocals, guitar, tambourine
- Minnie Coathanger - vocals, bass, tambourine
- Rusty Coathanger - vocals, drums
- Bebe Coathanger - vocals, keys
