= Captain Holojoy's Space Diner =

EP by Man or Astro-man?
- Released: 1993
- Recorded: Zero Return 1993
- Genre: Surf rock
- Label: Lucky Records

Man or Astro-man? chronology
| Supersonic Toothbrush Helmet (1993) | Captain Holojoy's Space Diner (1993) | Mission into Chaos! (1993) |

Captain Holojoy's Space Diner is a Man or Astro-man? 7-inch EP released on Lucky Records in 1993. It was released on opaque pink vinyl and black vinyl. It came with two inserts: a postcard showing the Astromen eating in a diner, and a larger card stock insert with a photo of a band member on one side and fictitious song lyrics on the other.

== Track listing ==
=== In-Between Meals Side ===
- "The Universe's Only Intergalactic Radioactive Breakfast Bar"
- "Taco Wagon" (Dick Dale)
- "Holojoy's Interlude"

=== TV Dinner Side ===
- "Mystery Meat"
- "Space Potatoes" (Rozier)
- "You Can't Get Good Riblets in Space"

== Line Up ==
- Star Crunch - Freeze Dried Guitar Pickin'
- Birdstuff - Interstellar Moon Drums with Fruit Roll Up Heads Played on with Lik-a-Sticks
- Dr. Deleto and His Invisible Vaportron - Microwavable Radiacto Bass
- Coco the Electronic Monkey Wizard - Mammoth Venusion Space Bananas
