= Inside the Head of John Peel =

EP by Man or Astro-man?
- Released: 1997
- Recorded: Maida Vale 1995
- Genre: surf rock
- Label: Astro-Fonic Records

Man or Astro-man? chronology
1000X (EP) (1997)	Inside the Head of John Peel (1997)	Made from Technetium (1997)

Inside the Head of John Peel is a Man or Astro-man? double 7-inch EP released on Astro-Fonic Records in 1997. It was recorded during a Peel Session on March 19, 1995, although the record states March 20, 1995. This is a bootleg release but it is not a bootleg recording of Man or Astro-man?. It came with a jukebox label insert.

== Track listing ==
A. Sferic Waves
B. ----- (Classified)
C. Inside the Head of John Peel
D. Max Q

== Contributors ==
- Bird Stuff - drums
- Coco The Electronic Monkey Wizard - bass
- Star Crunch - lead guitar, vocals
- Captain Zeno - rhythm guitar, vocals
