= Deluxe Men in Space =

EP by Man or Astro-man?
- Released: 1996
- Recorded: 10/11/95
- Studio: Zero Return
- Genre: Surf rock
- Label: Touch & Go Records; One Louder Records

Man or Astro-man? chronology
Two Blood-Soaked Space-Horror Hits!! (1995)	Deluxe Men in Space (1996)	The Sounds of Tomorrow (1996)

Deluxe Men in Space is a Man or Astro-man? 7-inch EP/CDEP released on Touch & Go Records and One Louder Records in 1996. The 7-inch was released on black vinyl, with a gatefold sleeve.

== Track listing ==
All tracks by Man or Astro-man? except where noted.

=== Vector Side ===
1. "Maximum Radiation Level" – 1:52
2. "U-URANUS" (Becker, Blake, Cacavas, Wolf) – 1:30
3. "March of the Androids" – 0:44

=== Vector Exit Side ===
1. "Super Rocket Rumble" (Black, Bob Garvey) – 2:31
2. "Configuration 9" – 2:04
3. "Rhombics" – 0:47

== Personnel ==
- Star Crunch – Primary guitar sound replications, voice waves
- Birdstuff – Mathematical tempo infusions
- Coco the Electronic Monkey Wizard – Tertiary low frequency guitar sound replication, all things wireless and good
- Dexter X, Man from Planet Q – Secondary guitar sound replication
