= 1000X (EP) =

EP by Man or Astro-man?
- Released: 1997
- Genre: Surf rock
- Length: 20:21
- Label: Touch and Go Records

Man or Astro-man? chronology
Experiment Zero (1996)	1000X (1997)	Inside the Head of John Peel (1997)

1000X is a 10" EP/CDEP released by Man or Astro-man?. The 10" was released in 1997, by Touch and Go Records on clear vinyl and on black vinyl and features seven tracks in the genre of Surf rock.

== Reception ==
In his review for Allmusic Mike DaRonco commented that "Man or Astro-man? could be the house band for every Star Trek convention across the country, sharing their love for sci-fi by incorporating it with nostalgic '60s surf rock. Lots of twangy guitar riffs mixed with B-movie samples and a high energy level cranked to 11 are spaced throughout 1000x" and concluded that the track "... Man Made of CO2 is worth the price of this album alone".

In his review for The A.V. Club John Krewson considered that "... there are more vocals than usual—true singing, not just the requisite scientific soundbites. It's a little edgier than usual for this band, and perhaps a fraction meaner, although the M.O. is still fast, fun and frenetic. Like all Man...Or Astro-Man? music, 1000X is an absolute blast."

== Track listing ==
1. "The Miracle of Genuine Pyrex" – 3:00
2. "Specify Gravity" – 3:05
3. "Like a Giant Microwave" – 3:23
4. "Man made of CO_{2}" – 2:14
5. "Universe City" – 1:45
6. "100 Individual Magnets" – 3:20
7. "With Automatic Shutoff" – 3:34
