= Cheap Sweaty Fun & TJ's Xmas =

EP by Man or Astro-man?
- Released: 1994
- Genre: Surf rock

Man or Astro-man? chronology
Creature Feature (1994)	Cheap Sweaty Fun & TJ's Xmas (1994)	Return to Chaos (1995)

Cheap Sweaty Fun & TJ's Xmas is a one-sided 7" single featuring music by Girls Against Boys and Man... or Astro-man?. It was given away as a party favor at a Christmas party in 1994. It is only available on black vinyl, and comes in a black sleeve with gold writing that indicates the band names and the track listing.

The single includes a small, folded paper insert stamped on the inside with the following text: "Cheap Sweaty Fun says Bollix to yis! Ho! Ho! Ho!" The cover of the insert features a picture of cowboys being bucked off horses and the text: "Everybody Looks Forward to Rodeos." The back of the insert indicates that the GvsB song is taken from the Touch and Go Records LP Cruise Yourself. The MoAM? tracks were recorded live at The Cumberland Arms in Newcastle, during their "Triumphant 1994 Tour."

== Track listing ==
=== A Side ===
Girls Against Boys

- "My Martini"

Man or Astro-man?

- "Journey to the Stars"
- "Space Patrol"
- "Indianapolis Kiss Off"

=== B Side ===
left blank
