= Brian Teasley =

American musician

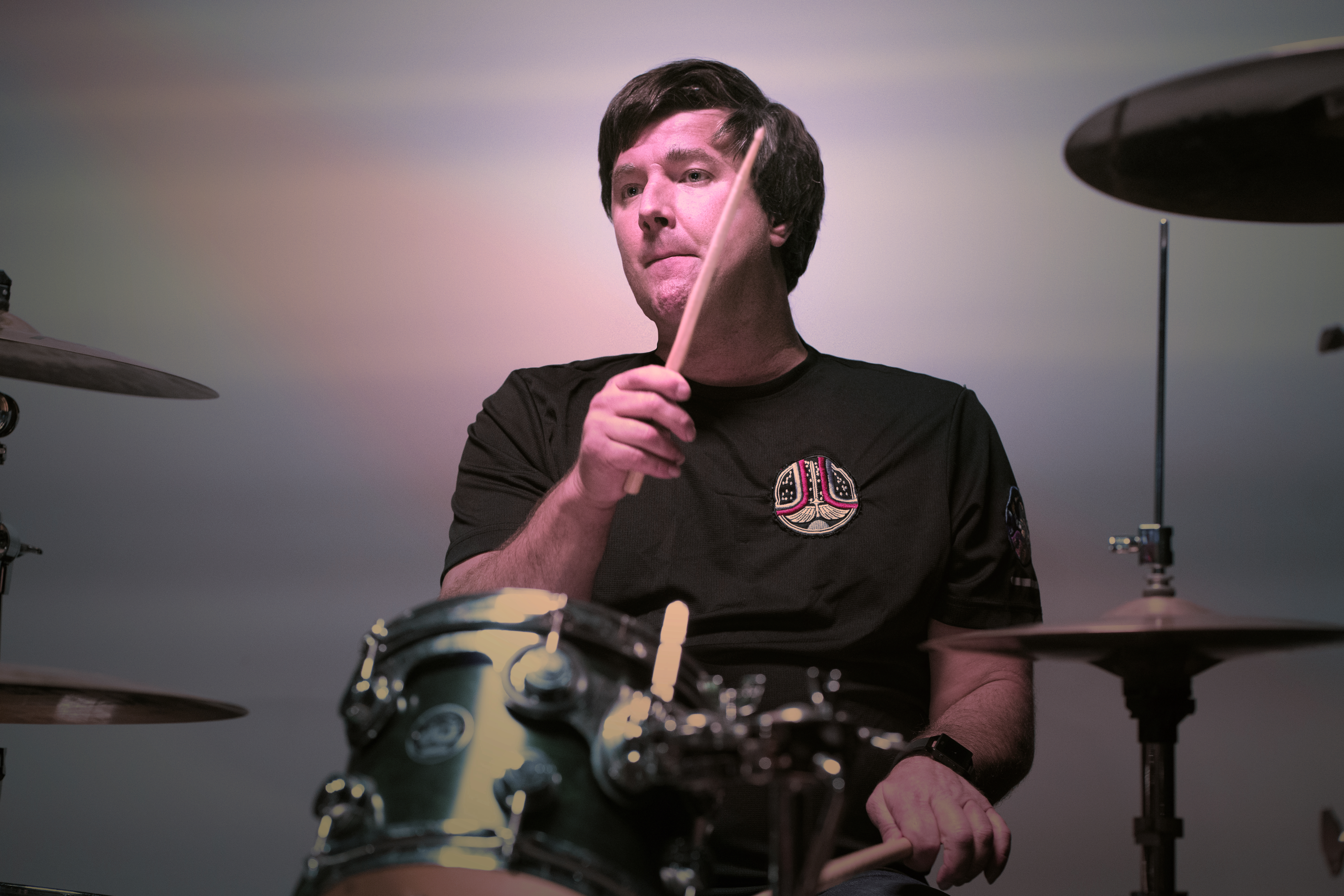
Brian Teasley

Brian Teasley is an American musician, producer, writer, and entrepreneur from Alabama. He is a founding member of Man or Astro-man? (Birdstuff), and Servotron (Z4-OBX).

== Music career ==
=== Performing ===
Teasley is a founding member of Man or Astro-man? (Birdstuff), and Servotron (Z4-OBX). Brian has also recorded and performed with The Causey Way, Shannon Wright, Japancakes, Tyro, Watts, The Mono Men, Har Mar Superstar, The Vue and The Polyphonic Spree. As of 2010, Teasley is touring with the reformed Man or Astro-Man?

Teasley has played over 3,000 shows in 48 countries and 50 states with bands like The Vue, The Polyphonic Spree, and St. Vincent. Teasley has opened on tour for bands such as David Bowie, The Rolling Stones, Cheap Trick, and Brian Wilson. He has appeared on over 100 records and performed on the David Letterman, Conan O'Brien, Jay Leno, Craig Kilborn, Austin City Limits, Jon Stewart, Alternative Nation, 120 Minutes and Jimmy Kimmel shows.

=== Comedy and Television ===
In the world of comedy and television, Brian has written and performed music for the Cartoon Network including Space Ghost Coast to Coast, The Jetsons, and other TV shows. He has toured live with the Mr. Show Tour and The Comedians of Comedy.

=== Producing ===
In 2007, he appeared as drummer and producer on St. Vincent's debut album, Marry Me.

=== Dallas airport incident ===
He once was on the F.B.I.s most wanted list for shutting down the Dallas airport with a vintage microphone (because it was thought to be a bomb).

== Entrepreneurship ==
Teasley was a promoter and owner at BottleTree in Birmingham, AL, up until 2014. Brian now owns and operates a club called Saturn, along with a coffee shop and bar called the Satellite in Birmingham, AL. He was the music director at the Auburn University radio station WEGL in 1993–1995. Teasley has owned a record store in Auburn, Alabama, Imaginary Records and has co-owned the Atlanta-based analog recording studio, Zero Return.

== Writing ==
Teasley was the head writer for the infamous 90s music / comedy fanzine, Chunklet Magazine, and a contributor to NME, The Onion, Stomp and Stammer, Creative Loafing, Vice, CMJ, Maximum Rock ’n’ Roll as well as other publications. Teasley has co-written two books: The Overrated Book and The Rock Bible and has two new books in the works.
