= Postphonic Star Exploration =

EP by Man or Astro-man?
- Released: 1995
- Recorded: Zero Return 1994
- Genre: Surf rock
- Label: Sympathy for the Record Industry

Man or Astro-man? chronology
Disjointed Parallels (1995)	Postphonic Star Exploration (1995)	Needles in the Cosmic Haystack (1995)

Postphonic Star Exploration is one of many EPs Man or Astro-man? released in 1995. It is a 5" record (smaller than the standard 7") and was released on black vinyl and clear green vinyl through Sympathy for the Record Industry.

== Critical reception ==
The album featured what the reviewer for Maximum Rocknroll called "two songs in that rich vein of [Man or Astro-man?] sci-fi surf." However, the reviewer, "Dr Dante," added that it was "pretty safely missable," because the a-side original—the b-side is a cover—was "no doubt bound for LP inclusion" and because a reader "probably can't play 5-inchers on [their] turntable."

German zine Bierfront was more positive calling the short album "fine and small" (feine und kleine) and describing a-side "Polaris" as "an authentic two-minute cyberspace journey."

== Track listing ==
- Alpha: "Polaris"
- Beta: "War of the Satellites"

== Personnel ==
- Captain Zeno
- Birdstuff
- Star Crunch
- CoCo the Electronic Monkey Wizard
