= Made from Technetium =

Studio album by Man or Astro-man?
- Released: 1997
- Genre: Surf rock, punk rock
- Label: (United States) Touch and Go Records (Australia) Au Go Go Records

Man or Astro-man? chronology
Inside the Head of John Peel (1997)	Made from Technetium (1997)	Ex Machina (1998)

Professional ratings
Review scores
Source	Rating
AllMusic	3/5 stars

Made From Technetium is the fourth full-length studio album by Man or Astro-man?, the 12" vinyl being released on either orange or black vinyl. In an interview, bassist Coco the Electronic Monkey Wizard joked that the album "was, in fact, made from technetium" and had caused cancer in a number of listeners.

== Track listing ==
1. "Message from the CD" / "Message from the LP"
2. "Lo Batt."
3. "Jonathan Winters Frankenstein"
4. "Don't Think What Jack"
5. "Junk Satellite"
6. "10 Years After World War 4"
7. "A Saucerful of Sucrets"
8. "Breathing Iron Oxide"
9. "Muzak for Cybernetics"
10. "Structo <Mr Microphone Mixup>"
11. "The Sound Waves Reversing"
12. "Theoretical Sounds of Slow Motion"
13. "Static Cling <Theme from>"
14. "Evert 1 Pipkin"
15. "Weightless at Zero Return"
