= Bazaar Bazaar =

Studio album by Birds of Avalon
- Released: May 22, 2007
- Genre: Progressive rock Psychedelic rock
- Length: 43:00
- Label: Volcom Entertainment
- Producer: Mitch Easter, Greg Elkins, and Brian Quast

Birds of Avalon chronology
Bazaar Bazaar (2007)	Outer Upper Inner (2008)

Professional ratings
Review scores
Source	Rating
AllMusic	3.5/5 stars

Bazaar Bazaar is the debut album by the Raleigh, North Carolina–based rock band Birds of Avalon. The album was released by Volcom Entertainment on May 22, 2007.

== Track listing ==
1. "Bicentennial Baby" 3:46
2. "Horse Called Dust" 3:26
3. "Instant Coma" 2:12
4. "Set You Free" 5:28
5. "Wanderlust" 2:03
6. "Taking Trains" 3:24
7. "Superpower" 4:03
8. "Where's My Blood?" 1:49
9. "Turn Gold" 3:54
10. "Think" 5:45
11. "Lost Pages from the Robot Repair Manual" 5:38
