= The Brains of the Cosmos =

EP by Man or Astro-man?
- Released: 1994
- Genre: Surf rock
- Label: Demolition Derby Records

Man or Astro-man? chronology
Astro Launch (1994)	The Brains of the Cosmos (1994)	Destroy All Astromen! (1994)

The Brains of the Cosmos is a Man or Astro-man? 7-inch EP released on Demolition Derby Records in 1994 and pressed exclusively on black vinyl. The cover claims this is the "first ever disc entirely recorded in outer space".

== Track listing ==
=== Side A ===
- "Electrostatic Brain Field"
- "Mach One"

=== Side B ===
- "XL-3 (Mezzo Mix)"
- "Cowboy Playing Dead (live)"

== Line Up ==
- Star Crunch - Illegal Temporal Lobe Telemarketing and Positronic Guitar Simulation
- Coco the Electronic Monkey Wizard - Digitally Enhanced Wernicke's Area with Passive Matrix Screen
- Dr. Deleto and His Invisible Vaportron - Low Frequency Therapy (5–15 Hz) for Random Inflammation of the Hypothalamus
- Birdstuff - Full Frontal Lobotomy
