= A Spectrum of Infinite Scale =

Studio album by Man or Astro-man?
- Released: 2000
- Genre: Electronic, experimental
- Label: Touch and Go Records

Man or Astro-man? chronology
EEVIAC operational index and reference guide, including other modern computational devices (1999)	A Spectrum of Infinite Scale (2000)	A Spectrum of Finite Scale (2001)

Professional ratings
Review scores
Source	Rating
AllMusic	3/5 stars
Pitchfork	7.8/10

A Spectrum of Infinite Scale is a full-length album by Man or Astro-man?, released in 2000. It was released as a CD and a double 10" on clear yellow/red vinyl, on black vinyl, and on additional clear colors.

The band plays an ImageWriter II on the eleventh song, "A Simple Text File."

== Critical reception ==
AllMusic called the album "another very good collection of tight playing and propulsive instrumentals." Exclaim! wrote: "Being one of the only groups to deservedly make it out of the mid-'90s surf revival, these guys continue to add influences and create a new style of their own that all but leaves surf behind." Orlando Weekly wrote that "more than ever, the guitars are telling stories of adventure."

== Track listing ==
1. "Pathway to the Infinite"
2. "Song of the Two-Mile Linear Particle Accelerator"
3. "Preparation Clont"
4. "Curious Constructs of Stem-Like Devices Which Now Prepare Themselves to Be Thought of as Fingers"
5. "Um Espectro Sem Escala"
6. "Many Pieces of Large Fuzzy Mammals Gathered Together at a Rave and Schmoozing with a Brick"
7. "Trapezoid"
8. "Very Subtle Elevators"
9. "Within One Universe There Are Millions"
10. "Spectrograph Reading of the Varying Phantom Frequencies of Chronic, Incurable Tinnitus"
11. "A Simple Text File"
12. "Obligatory Part 2 Song in Which There Is No Presently Existing Part 1, Nor the Plans to Make One"
13. "Multi-Variational Stimuli of Sub-Turgid Foci Covering Cross Evaluative Techniques for Cognitive Analysis of Hypersignificant Graph Peaks Following Those Intersubjective Modules Having Biodegradable Seepage"

== Japanese release ==
The Japanese version inserts two exclusive tracks, making "Multi-Variational Stimuli of Sub-Turgid Foci Covering Cross Evaluative Techniques for Cognitive Analysis of Hypersignificant Graph Peaks Following Those Intersubjective Modules Having Biodegradable Seepage" track 15.

- Track 13: "Particles In Acceleration"
- Track 14: "Two Microscopic Creatures Meet, One Devours The Other "
