= A Spectrum of Finite Scale =

Studio album by Man or Astro-man?
- Released: 2001
- Genre: Experimental music
- Label: Zerotec

Man or Astro-man? chronology
A Spectrum of Infinite Scale (2000)	A Spectrum of Finite Scale (2001)	Beyond the Black Hole (2001)

Professional ratings
Review scores
Source	Rating
AllMusic	4/5 stars

A Spectrum of Finite Scale is a tour-only album by the band Man or Astro-man? A departure from the band's space-surf instrumentals, A Spectrum of Finite Scale is a compilation of experiments produced by members of the Man or Astro-Man? team.

Tracks were contributed by pairs of band members, individual members, and personnel including soundman The Brannock Device and Q-Beam.

== Track listing ==
1. "After All the Prosaic Waiting...the Sun Finally Crashes into the Earth"
2. "The Limitations of a Serial Machine"
3. "MO_{2}"
4. "Halfway to the Infinite"
5. "Space Helmet"
6. "All the Quietest Whispers"
7. "Mt-52 Tone/Magnus Opus" [sic]
8. "Tolerance in a Transitory Universe"
9. "Analysis Paralysis"
10. "Man or Man-Machine?"
11. "The Potential Energy of Roger Stone"
12. "Mortimer Butomite's Pocket of Capacitors"
13. "Fig. A: Dispersion in Full Spectrum Pattern"
14. "(untitled track number thirty-two)"
