= Outer Upper Inner =

EP by Birds of Avalon
- Released: March 18, 2008
- Genre: Psychedelic rock
- Label: Volcom Entertainment

Birds of Avalon chronology
Bazaar Bazaar (2007)	Outer Upper Inner (2008)	Uncanny Valley (2009)

Outer Upper Inner is an EP by the Raleigh, North Carolina–based psychedelic rock band Birds of Avalon. The album was released by Volcom Entertainment on March 18, 2008.

== Track listing ==
1. "Measure of the Same" 3:27
2. "Shakey Tiger" 4:19
3. "Earthbound" 5:14
4. "Hazy 98" 3:05
5. "The Reeds" 2:38
6. "Keep It Together, Thackery" 4:51
