= Man or Astro-man? in Orbit =

EP by Man or Astro-man?
- Released: 1995
- Recorded: Zero Return; October 09, 1994
- Genre: Surf rock
- Label: Shake It Records
- Producer: Birdstuff

Man or Astro-man? chronology
Return to Chaos (1995)	Man or Astro-man? in Orbit (1995)	Disjointed Parallels (1995)

Man or Astro-man? in Orbit is a Man or Astro-man? 7-inch EP released on Shake It Records in 1995. It was released on clear vinyl and black vinyl. On the record sleeve the band members are listed as "Mission Astronauts" rather than musicians since the title implies that the band will be in orbit.

- Man or Astroman? embellishes its music and live performances with space-age themes, science-fiction audio and video samples, and vintage and homemade electronic equipment.

== Track listing ==
=== Side A ===
- "Complex 34"
- "Alpha Surfari" (The Surfaris)

=== Side B ===
- "Manta Ray" (The Pixies)
- "Space Helmet"

== Mission Astronauts ==
- Birdstuff
- Coco The Electronic Monkey Wizard
- Star Crunch
- Captain Zeno
