= Return to Chaos (EP) =

EP by Man or Astro-man?
- Released: 1995
- Genre: Surf rock
- Label: Homo Habilis Records; One Louder Records

Man or Astro-man? chronology
Cheap Sweaty Fun & TJ's Xmas (1994)	Return to Chaos (1995)	Man or Astro-man? in Orbit (1995)

Return to Chaos is a Man or Astro-man? 7-inch EP released on Homo Habilis Records/One Louder Records in 1995. It was released in a manilla folder style sleeve. The US version (Homo Habilis) is marked "Top Secret" and the UK version (One Louder) is marked "State Secret". It was released on clear vinyl and black vinyl.

== Track listing ==
=== A Side (The New No. 2 Side) ===
- "Point Blank"
- "Goldfinger" (John Barry)

=== B Side (No. 2 Side) ===
- "------- (Classified)"
- "Secret Agent Conrad Uno"
