= Uncanny Valley (film) =

- Promotional poster
- Directed by: Federico Heller
- Written by: Federico Heller
- Produced by: Federico Heller
- Starring: Marcela Sandra Ballestero; Steve Kisicki; Iván Steinhardt; Agustin Olcese; Raymond Lee; Nicole Apstein
- Cinematography: Nicolas Trovato; Fernando Lorenzale
- Edited by: Federico Heller
- Music by: Cyrille Marchesseau
- Release date: November 30, 2015
- Running time: 9 minutes
- Country: Argentina
- Language: English

Uncanny Valley is a 2015 Argentine short film directed by Federico Heller. The video was released on Vimeo on November 30, 2015.

== Plot ==
In a dystopian future, various people addicted to virtual reality play a first-person shooter video game. Near the end of the film, the virtual reality set of one of the players malfunctions, and it is revealed that the players are remotely controlling battle robots in an actual battlefield, providing skill and tactics. The "targets" that they are shooting are actual people, including civilians. The player who discovered this then disconnects. Shortly thereafter, he is approached by a robot, presumably controlled by another player, and becomes a target.

== Reception ==
Ross A. Lincoln of Deadline Hollywood compared the film to the novels Ready Player One and All You Need Is Kill. Meanwhile, Adi Robertson of The Verge praised the film for its combination of documentary-style footage and in-game video game footage.

After its release, the video was featured as a "Staff Pick" for the Vimeo site. In October 2016, the film won Best Short at Animago. The film was also featured at the Shnit international shortfilmfestival.
