= Chunklet (magazine) =

American humor and music magazine

Chunklet is a Georgia-based American humor and music magazine founded by Henry H. Owings in 1993.

== History ==
Henry Owings began publishing Chunklet in Athens, GA, while freelancing for alternative newsweekly Flagpole Magazine. "The main reason the mag started was due to my dissatisfaction with how my writing was handled in the Flaghole." Owings says. Although, he has intimated that Chunklet is a sanctuary for self-hating critics.

Since 1993, Chunklet has published 20 issues on no particular schedule. The first 19 of these are out of print. The magazine includes this disclaimer on Chunklet.com: "Chunklet comes out with little regard to a set schedule only because the contributors are busy with their other activities such as being in bands, work, family, putting out records, habitual laziness, television, our lord and savior Jesus Christ and internet porn."

Issues typically revolve around a central theme, such as Chunklet 15: "Is this Guy the Biggest Asshole in Rock?"; Chunklet 17: "Pay to (NOT) Play" (January 2003); Chunklet 18: "The Overrated Issue" Part One (February 2004) and Chunklet 19: "The Overrated Issue, Part Two" (January 2005). Content generally includes interviews with comedians and indie rock musicians, tour diaries, cartoons, prank correspondence, satirical essays, lists, hipster how-to guides, and advice columns. Some issues contained premiums like CDs, 7" singles, or in the case of Chunklet 17, blank checks made out to "Your Shitty Band."

== Style ==
Owings cites three main comedic and visual influences: Dave Eggers’ Might magazine, MAD, and National Lampoon. Musically, Owings says the fanzines Conflict (published by Matador Records co-owner Gerard Cosloy), Siltbreeze , Forced Exposure, Your Flesh, Touch and Go, Slash and Search and Destroy "were all I ever cared about."

In a 2008 interview with Rob Harvilla in the Village Voice, Owings explained, "I think we live in a time right now, especially with the Internet, and especially with comment sections on blogs, where everybody can take their potshots—everybody can post anonymously and get their dig in. Fuck that. Everybody knows where I live. Everybody knows that I sign the checks. It has my name on it. You think I'm some kind of chickenshit? Let's talk about the last 10 records each of us bought. Let's talk about how many shows a year we go to. Let's talk about real nitty-gritty stuff, instead of this teeth-clenching hipster fashionista reactionary following of music. Let's talk nitty-gritty. You want to talk history? You want to talk criticism? I'm a fan of all of it. And as a fan, I sometimes take it to extremes."

Harvilla further explains, "To create the illusion that you hate everything, you have to know everything, and if you're bothered enough to know everything, then you actually must love everything… Henry likens a Chunklet insult to a "Weird Al" Yankovic homage: Grit your teeth and take it as a compliment." Owings runs with the reputation, and occasionally issues T-shirts with withering yet self-deprecating slogans such as "We’re All In This Together… Except You, You’re A Dick" (coined and designed by Mark Wasserman of San Francisco’s Plinko Design) and "I Collect Records Because Pussy Hates Me" (created by the Chunklet staff and designed by Chris Bilheimer to commemorate Record Store Day 2010).

== Name ==
Owings lifted the name Chunklet from an ice machine next to which the redneck proprietor was receiving a mani-pedi from his wife and daughter at a run-down convenience store west of Athens.

== Connection to Alternative Comedy and Indie Rock Scenes ==
By 2003, as Chunklet celebrated its tenth anniversary, Owings developed hipster ennui with respect to the "regular" rock or indie circuit and expanded his scope to include the budding alternative comedy movement. The Chunklet 10th anniversary party "was where a lot of the stars aligned" as comedians Patton Oswalt, David Cross, and Greg Behrendt were on the bill. Since then, Chunklet regularly features interviews with and contributions from such alt-comedy figures as Oswalt, Cross, Brian Posehn, Maria Bamford, Janeane Garofalo, Paul F. Tompkins, Jon Glaser, Zach Galifianakis, Sarah Silverman, H. Jon Benjamin, Bob Odenkirk, and Eugene Mirman. Oswalt, Odenkirk, and Posehn also contributed to Chunklet’s The Overrated Book while Oswalt, Mirman, and Galifianakis contributed to The Rock Bible.

== Staff ==
For the first nine issues, the Chunklet staff used pseudonyms. Henry Owings: Heimlich the Bastard, Lisa Brown: Noser, John Burrows: Jason Slatton, Jerry Fuchs: Dinglefairy, Jezz Thorpe: Lucky Ducky.

=== Henry H. Owings – Publisher/Editor/Art Director ===
In addition to his work as a freelance journalist and magazine publisher, Henry Owings is a prolific concert promoter (with over 1,000 shows to his credit), label owner (releasing albums by Olivia Tremor Control, Servotron, Oblivians, Man... Or Astro-man?, The Minders, Azusa Plane, I Am Spoonbender), tour manager (Comedians of Comedy, Man... or Astro-man?, Servotron) and Grammy-nominated graphic designer and record producer.

Owings launched a graphic design arm, Chunklet Graphic Control, in 1997 and has since designed countless books, magazine layouts, album/DVD/book covers and marketing materials. A selected curriculum vitae:

==== Production ====
Owings produced every Patton Oswalt album and received a Grammy nomination for My Weakness Is Strong (2009, Warner Bros.) He also produced Brian Posehn's Fart and Wiener Jokes on Relapse Records (uncredited).

== WhirlyBall ==
Owing, the Chunklet staff and various friends a/k/a Team Chunklet, regularly challenge indie rock bands to games of WhirlyBall after which some of the bands performed. Team Chunklet is currently 61-0. Les Savy Fav claims to have tied and American Analog Set claims that Team Chunklet has forfeited games. No substantiation exists. Chunklet 20: "The Last Magazine Ever Printed" contains a best-of feature with photos from matches with The Arcade Fire, Torche, The Hold Steady, Mogwai, Death Cab for Cutie, Magnolia Electric Co., Deerhunter, Isis, Les Savy Fav, Swearing at Motorists, The Black Lips, The Shins, Queens of the Stone Age, Melvins, Underoath, Qui, Battles, Fatal Flying Guillotines, and Ted Leo and the Pharmacists. Vampire Weekend and Man... or Astro-man? have also faced off against Team Chunklet.

The following bands have actually performed concerts at Whirlyball Atlanta: The Black Lips, Dark Meat, Diplo, Noot D'Noot, Fatal Flying Guiloteens, Mogwai, Growing, Torche, Melvins with David Yow, Big Business, Les Savy Fav, Liverhearts, Ted Leo and the Pharmacists, Birds of Avalon, Gentleman Jesse & His Men, Coffin Bound, Carbonas, The Coathangers, The Selmanaires, Deerhunter, Monotonix, Matt & Kim, The NEC, All The Saints and Man… or Astro-man?

Chunklet also hosted the Elephant 6 Holiday Surprise Tour in early 2011 at WhirlyBall Atlanta.

Chunklet issued three WhirlyBall 7" records with perforated tickets to each match attached to the sleeve. Records/tickets to each show were exclusively sold at Criminal Records based in Atlanta, Georgia. All records feature exclusive material by every band on the bill.

WHIRLYCHUNK-001 Bands: Deerhunter, The Selmanaires, The Coathangers, Carbonas

WHIRLYCHUNK-002 https://theblacklips.blogspot.com/2008/01/chunklet-whirleyball-single.html / https://itcoversthehillsides.blogspot.com/2007/12/WhirlyBall-show-black-lips-gentleman.html) Bands: The Black Lips, Gentleman Jesse & His Men, Coffin Bound, Baby Shakes

WHIRLYCHUNK-003 (https://creativeloafing.com/content-158024-diplo-and-dark-meat-go-head-to-head-at-whirlyball-this) Bands: Dark Meat, Diplo

=== Availability ===
Chunklet is distributed by Carrot Top, Emma Marian Ltd. (Canada), Last Gasp, Revolver, Small Changes, Sonic Unyon (Canada), and Ubiquity.

Retail outlets include Atomic Books (Baltimore), Aquarius Records (San Francisco), Criminal Records (Atlanta), Grapevine Music (Boone, NC), Harvest Records (Asheville, NC), Jackpot Records (Portland, OR), Newbury Comics (Boston), Mad Platter (Riverside, CA), Pegasus (Berkeley & Oakland), Powell's Books(Portland, OR), Quimby's (Chicago), Reckless (Chicago), Reptilian (Baltimore), Rough Trade (London), Sam Weller's Books (Salt Lake City), Spaceboy (Philly), The Record Exchange (Boise), Twisted Village (Cambridge), Vintage Vinyl (St. Louis), Waterloo Records (Austin).

As of 8/28/2010 all issues except Chunklet 20 are out of print, however content from many back issues is available on Chunklet.com.

=== Books ===
The Overrated Book (Last Gasp, 2006) Compiles the majority of Chunklets 18 and 19 along with 40 pages of new material.

The Rock Bible: Unholy Scripture for Fans & Bands (Quirk Books, 2008) Originally intended as the theme to a new issue, but "exploded into a book in nine weeks."

== Discography ==
=== CDs ===
CHKCD001 Patton Oswalt 222 (Live & Uncut) (February 2005) Unedited 2'22" tapes of the first album recorded at the 40 Watt Club in Athens.

CHKCD002 Patton Oswalt Vs. Alcohol Vs. Zach Vs. Patton (with Zach Galifianakis) CD-EP (June 2005) Patton and Zach drunk, insulting each other at the EARL (East Atlanta Restaurant Lounge). www.badearl.com

CHKCD003 Patton Oswalt ...And the Pennsylvania Macaroni Company (Aug 2006 - OOP) Features Henry Owings, Brian Posehn, Maria Bamford and Eugene Mirman Recorded at Logan Square Auditorium, Chicago, 2006

CHKCD004 [2008] Patton (OOP) WFMU radio fundraiser premium, limited edition of 700.

CHKCDCOC001-004 [2006]

Comedians of Comedy 3" CDs (OOP) One 3" CD each from Patton Oswalt, Maria Bamford, Brian Posehn, and Eugene Mirman. All exclusive material, packaged with trading cards.

=== Singles ===
CHK011.5 Don Caballero Waltor/Shuman Center 91 (1995, OOP) Included with Chunklet 11.

CHK017.5 Les Savy Fav/David Cross 7" (2003, OOP) Chunklet.com premium for Chunklet 17.

CHK018.5 Jason Molina No Moon On The Water (2004, OOP) Chunklet.com premium for Chunklet 18.

CHK019.5 Melvins/Patton Oswalt 7" (2006, OOP) Sold as a memento to the 13th anniversary.

CHK020.5 Ted Leo/Zach Galifianakis 7" (2008, OOP) Chunklet.com premium for Chunklet 20. Some pressed on picture disc.

=== LPs ===
CHKLP001 Les Savy Fav Let's Stay Friends (2007) Limited edition of 1070 including 100 on clear vinyl and 70 on gold.

CHKLP002 Harvey Milk Courtesy And Goodwill Towards Men (2008) Initial reprinting of 500 used the remaining original jackets from Reproductive. A vinyl pressing fiasco necessitated a total re-print. The sleeves are letter pressed and sport a thick spine (unlike the original pressing).

CHKLP003 Harvey Milk The Pleaser/Live Pleaser (2008) Double LP, limited pressing of 1000, with 400 copies on red/blue vinyl, 400 gold/green, 100 clear with splatter, 100 black.

CHKLP004 Harvey Milk My Love Is Higher Than Your Assessment Of What My Love Could Be (2008) Limited edition vinyl: 100 powder blue, 100 dark gold, 100 clear with splatter

== Filmography ==
CHKDVD001 Brother Vs. Brother (2004) Filmed at South-by-Southwest (SXSW) 2004.

CHKDVD002 Buckshot Boys (2005) Filmed at All Tomorrow’s Parties in December 2004.

CHKDVD003 (DELETED) South-By-South Death (2006) Boy Scout-themed production filmed at SXSW 2005. Owings’ lawyer strongly discouraged him from releasing it, but it is available online.

CHKDVD004 Harvey Milk Anthem (2006) A multi-camera shoot of the final Harvey Milk gig with Paul opening for Melvins w/David Yow at the Chunklet 13th anniversary. Reissued APR09 (2nd edition, CHKDVDCD004.5) with four previously unreleased tracks and an hour of additional material.

== Anniversary Parties ==
First Anniversary: December 4, 1994 Venue: Skate-A-Round USA, Athens, GA Performers: Man… or Astro-man?

Second Anniversary: October, 1995 Venue: The Landfill, Athens, GA Performers: The Olivia Tremor Control, Thee Speaking Canaries, Joe Christmas

Third Anniversary: August 31, 1996 Venue: Q-Zar Laser Tag (Athens) Performers: Servotron

Tenth Anniversary: April 1–3, 2003 Venue: 40 Watt Club Performers: Patton Oswalt, David Cross, Greg Behrendt, Har Mar Superstar, Oxes, Neal Pollack

Thirteenth Anniversary: October 27–28, 2006 Venue: Variety Playhouse, WhirlyBall Atlanta and the 40 Watt Club Performers: Zach Galifianakis, Patton Oswalt, Harvey Milk, Melvins with David Yow, Big Business, Elf Power, puppet show

Fifteenth Anniversary: October 10–11, 2008 Venue: 40 Watt Club Performers: Brent Weinbach, Brian Posehn, Deerhunter, Gentleman Jesse and his Men, Twin Tigers, Mastodon
