= EEVIAC Operational Index and Reference Guide, Including Other Modern Computational Devices =

Studio album by Man or Astroman?
- Released: 1999
- Genre: Surf rock, punk rock, electronic, experimental
- Label: Touch and Go Records/Epitaph Records(European Release)

Man or Astroman? chronology
Ex Machina (1998)	EEVIAC Operational Index and Reference Guide, Including Other Modern Computational Devices (1999)	A Spectrum of Infinite Scale (2000)

Professional ratings
Review scores
Source	Rating
AllMusic	4/5 stars

EEVIAC Operational Index and Reference Guide, Including Other Modern Computational Devices is the fifth studio album by Man or Astroman?. E.E.V.I.A.C. is an acronym and stands for "Embedded Electronic Variably Integrated Astro Console" (also known as the "EEVIAC Mainframe Supercomputer") and is a play on ENIAC, which is sometimes hailed as the first modern computer.

Man or Astroman? actually built a mockup of a supercomputer to have onstage for this album.

== Track listing ==
1. "Interstellar Hardrive"
2. "D:Contamination"
3. "U-235/PU-239"
4. "Domain of the Human Race"
5. "Theme from EEVIAC"
6. "A Reversal of Polarity"
7. "Fractionalized Reception of a Scrambled Transmission"
8. "Engines of Difference"
9. "Psychology of A.I. (Numbers Follow Answers)"
10. "Krasnoyask-26"
11. "Within the Mainframe, Impaired Vision from Inoperable Cataracts Can Become a New Impending Nepotism"
12. "As Estrelas Agora Elas Estão Mortas"
13. "_____/Myopia"
14. "Automated Liner Notes Sequence" (unlisted)
