= Experiment Zero =

Studio album by Man or Astro-man?
- Released: 1996
- Genre: Surf rock, punk rock, electronic rock
- Label: Touch and Go Records; One Louder Records
- Producer: Steve Albini

Man or Astro-man? chronology
What Remains Inside a Black Hole (1996)	Experiment Zero (1996)	1000X (1997)

Professional ratings
Review scores
Source	Rating
AllMusic	3/5 stars

Experiment Zero is an album by the American band Man or Astro-man? It was released in 1996 by Touch and Go Records.

== Production ==
Produced by Steve Albini, the album was recorded in three days.

== Critical reception ==
The New York Times wrote that the band "deploys a manic punk velocity, and sprinkles its music with sine-wave oscillator noises and space-documentary sound bites; otherwise its material is fairly faceless." The Austin American-Statesman concluded that, as "a celebration of robotic white-guy stiffness, this music has the soul of a Jetsons episode."

== Track listing ==
1. "Stereo Phase Test"
2. "Television Fission"
3. "DNI"
4. "Planet Collision"
5. "Big Trak Attack"
6. "9 Volt"
7. "Evil Plans of Planet Spectra"
8. "Anoxia"
9. "Maximum Radiation Level"
10. "King of the Monsters"
11. "Cyborg Control"
12. "Test Driver" (Takeshi Terauchi)
13. "Television Man" (Talking Heads)
14. "Z-X3"
15. "Principles Unknown"
16. "The Space Alphabet" - (Vinyl-only bonus track)
