= Mono Men =

American garage punk band

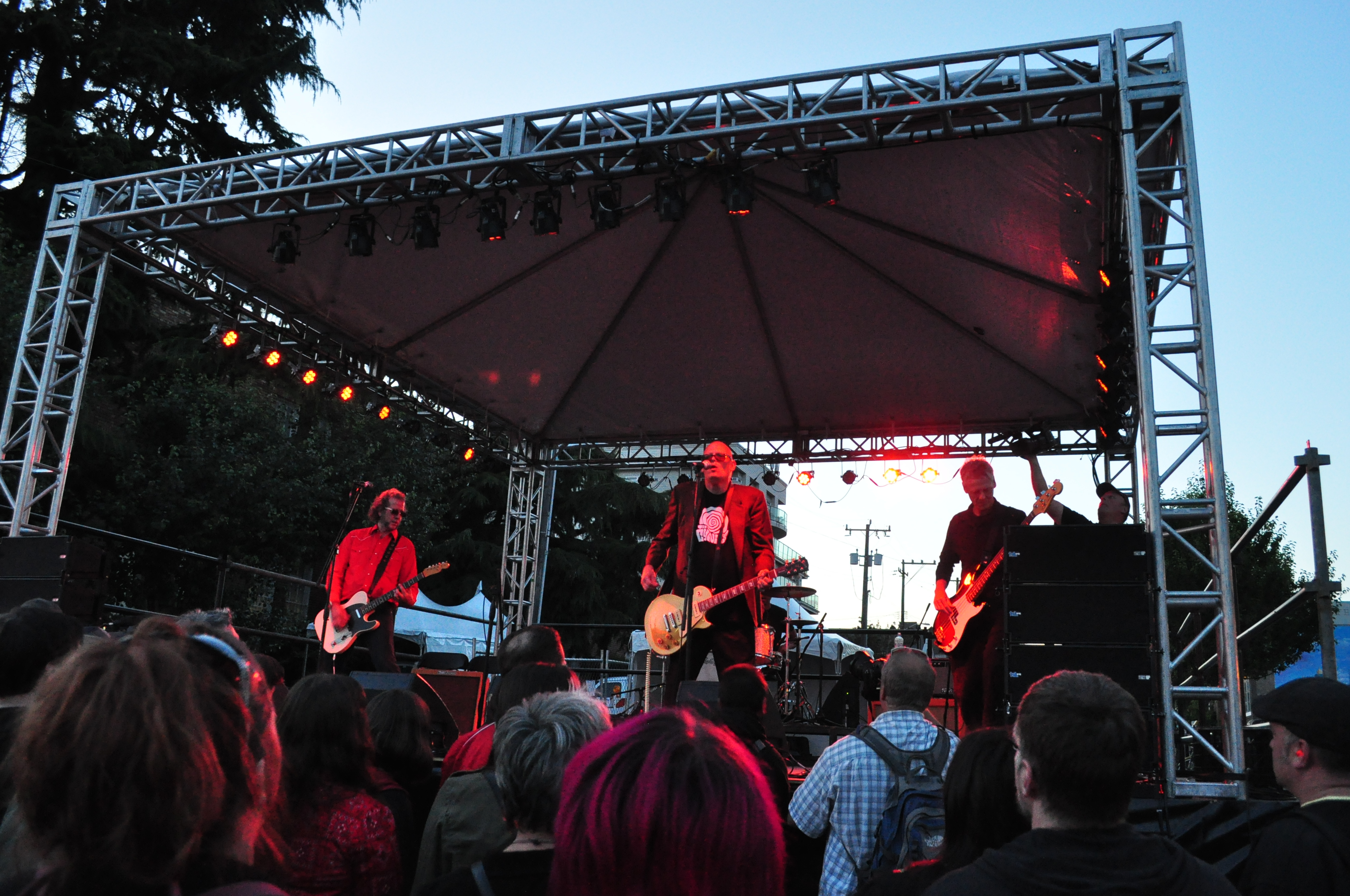
- Mono Men performing at West Seattle Summer Fest, 2013

Background information
- Origin: Bellingham, WA, USA
- Genres: Garage punk, grunge, surf rock
- Years active: 1987–1998, 2006, 2013
- Labels: Sub Pop; Estrus; Impossible Records; Scat; 1+2 Records
- Past members: Dave Crider; Ledge Morrisette; Aaron Roeder; John Mortensen; Marx Wright

The Mono Men were an American garage punk band based in Bellingham, Washington. Their sound contained elements of grunge (distortion-heavy guitars, sneering vocals), but the Mono Men filtered these through a mimicry of 1960s Washington proto-punk, garage rock bands such as The Sonics.

== History ==
The group was formed by members of another Washington band, the Roofdogs. John Mortensen came from the Dehumanizers and Game for Vultures before joining the Mono Men. The band came together in late 1987. They played shows in Europe, Mexico, Japan, Canada, and the United States. They were featured in the Northwest Rock & Roll documentary Hype!. Their albums all received generally positive reviews. The band split in 1998, though in 2006, the Mono Men reunited to play a series of concerts called the "Spanish Attack." The band reunited in 2013 to play shows in Bellingham and Seattle in the US, plus a tour in Latin America with shows in Mexico, Argentina and Brazil.

== Members ==
- Dave Crider (guitar, vocals)
- Ledge Morrisette (bass)
- Aaron Roeder (drums)
- John Mortensen (guitar, vocals) (from late 1990, died 2022)
- Marx Wright (vocals, guitar) (1987–1990; 2013)
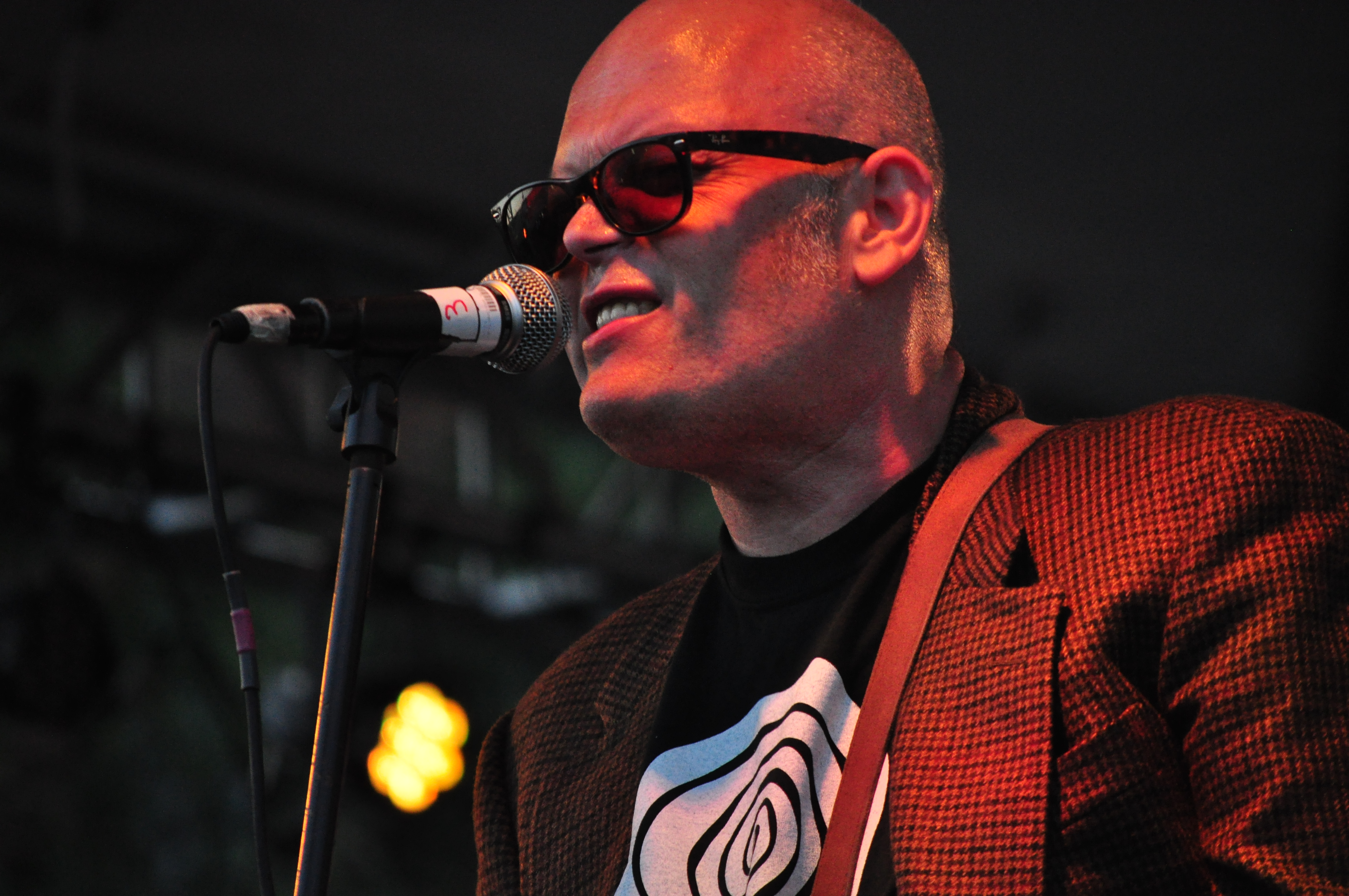
John Mortensen

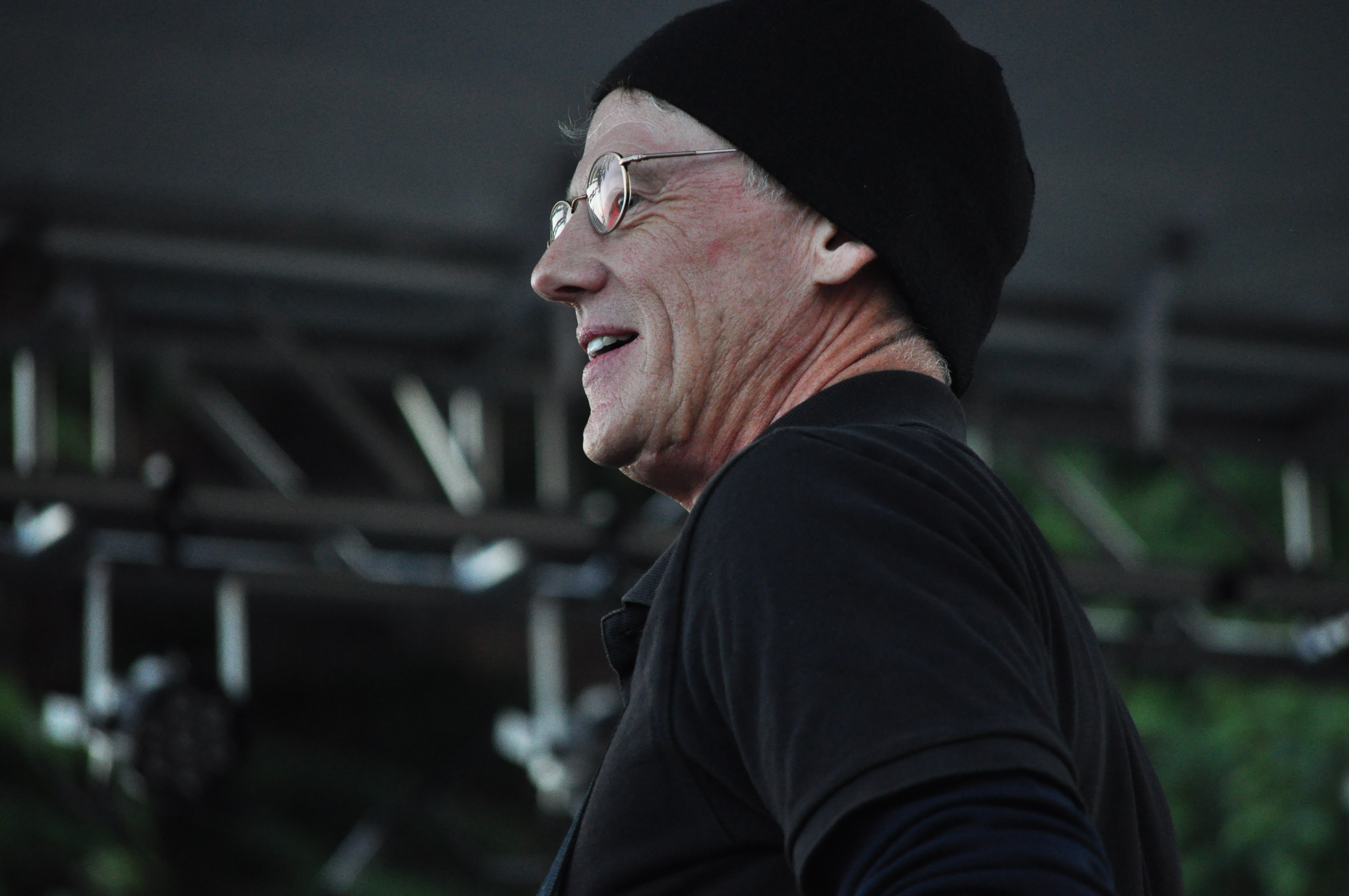
Ledge Morrisette

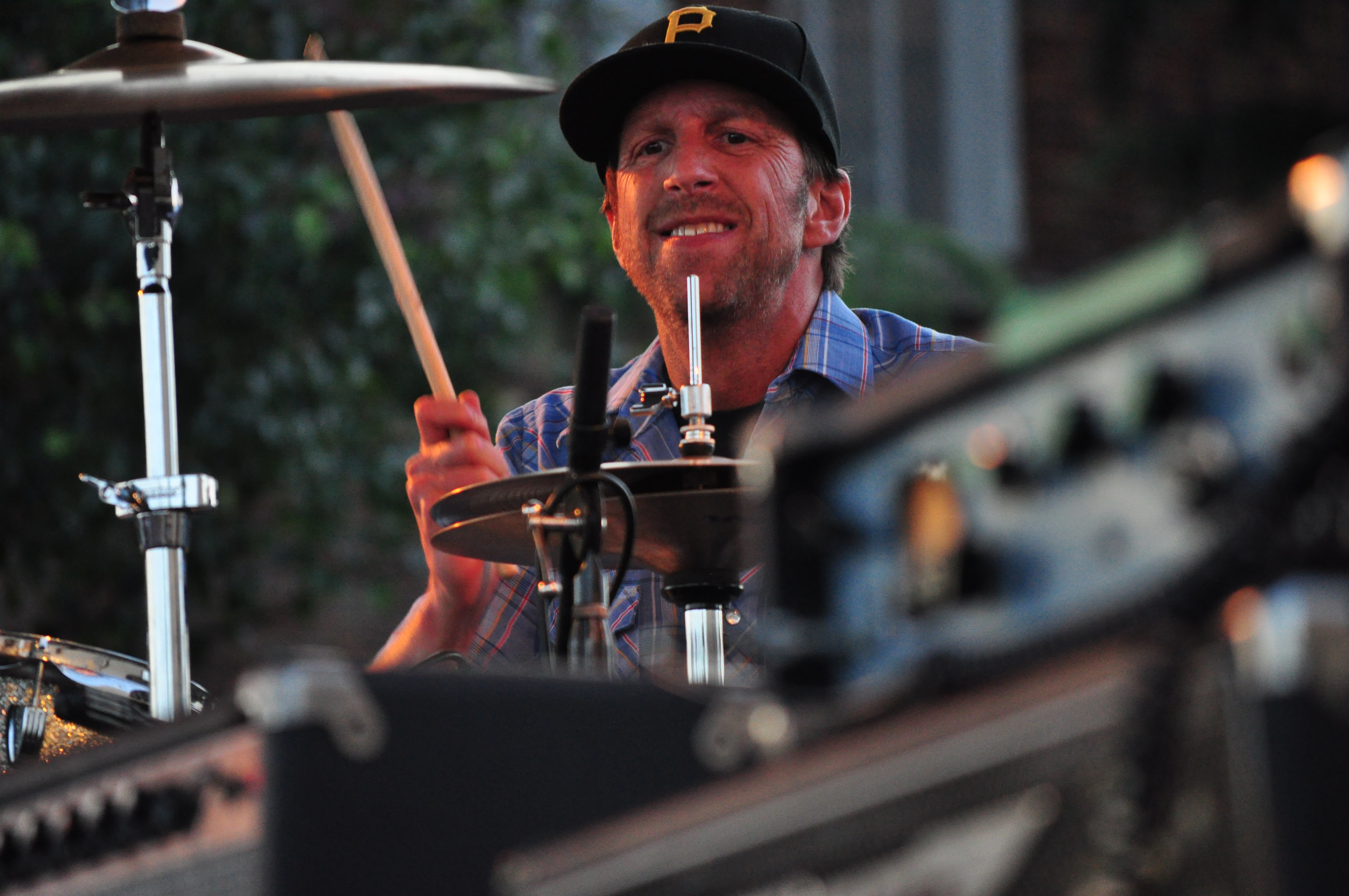
Aaron Roeder

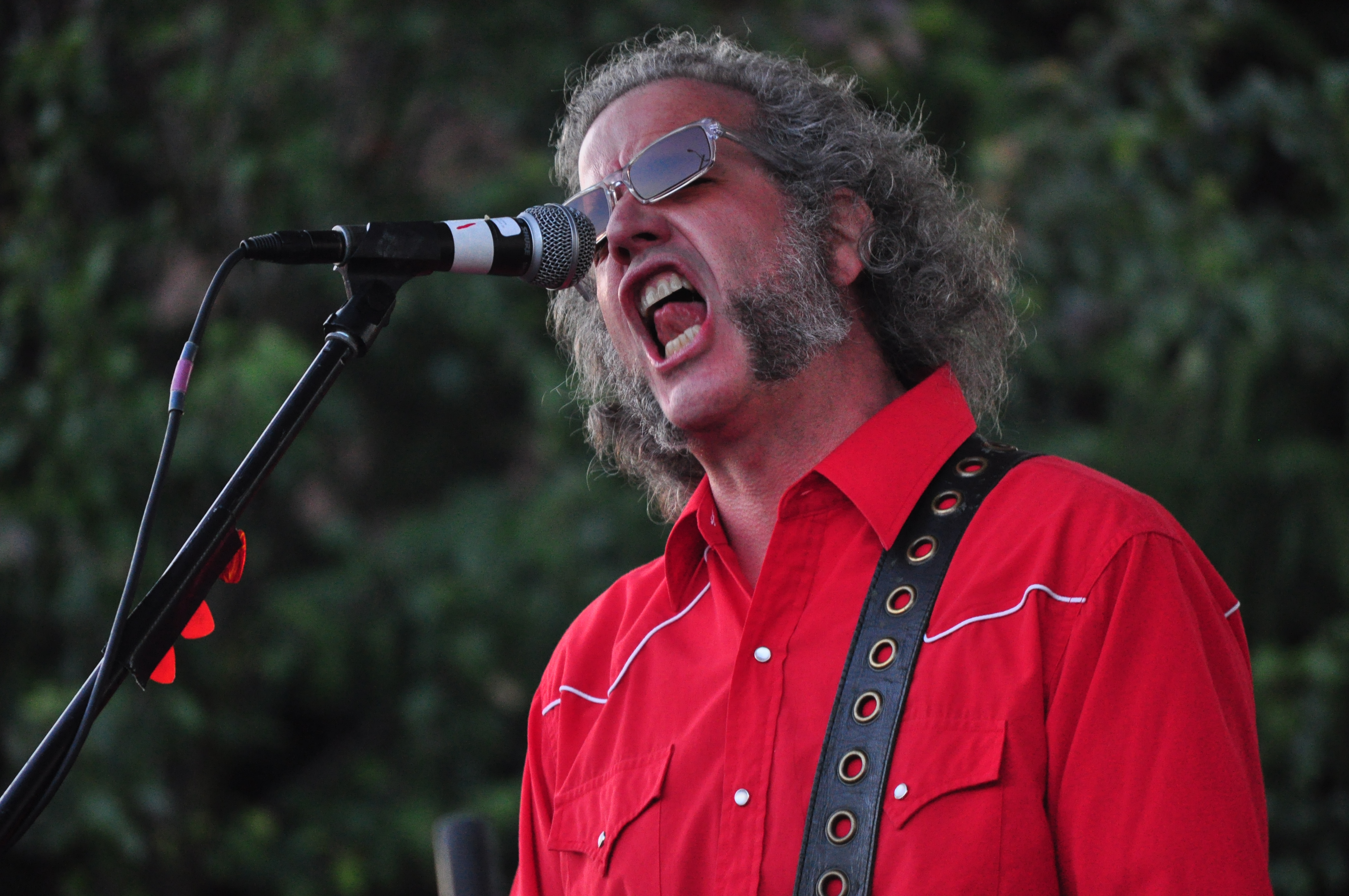
Dave Crider

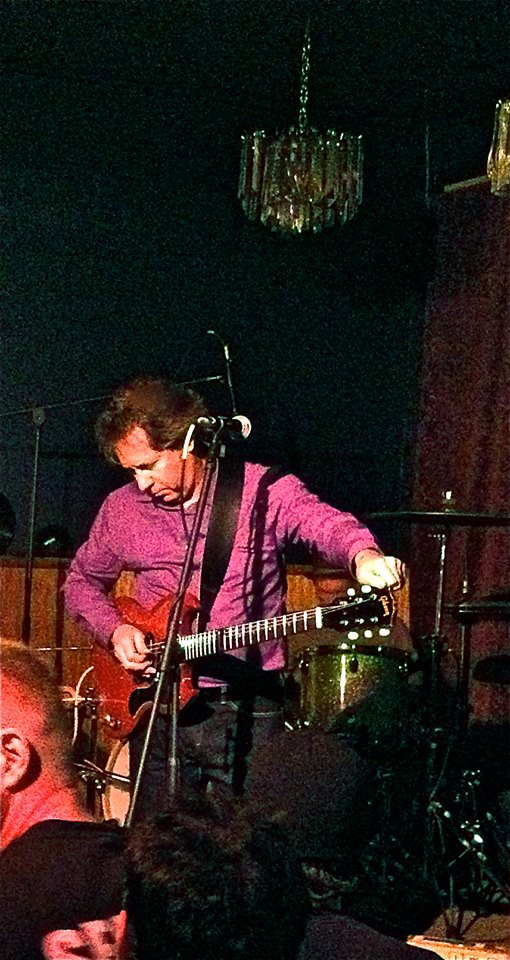
Marx Wright

== Discography ==
=== Albums and EPs ===
- Stop Dragging Me Down (Estrus, 1990)
- Wrecker! (Estrus, 1992)
- Back to Mono (1+2 Records, 1992). The title is a reference to a Phil Spector slogan, advocating monophonic recording.
- Shut Up! (Estrus, 1993)
- Bent Pages (Estrus, 1993)
- Sin and Tonic (Estrus, 1994)
- Those Mono Men Recorded Live at Tom's Strip and Bowl (Estrus, 1995)
- Gypsy Woman Live (Impossible Records, 1995)
- Ten Cool Ones (Scat, 1996)
- Have a Nice Day, Motherfucker (Estrus, 1997)

=== Split Singles ===
- 1993 - Demolition Derby w/ Apeman Dragship
- 1994 - Kronophonic w/ Stokastikats
- 1995 - Gearhead w/ Girl Trouble
