= Intravenous Television Continuum =

Studio album by Man or Astroman?
- Released: 1996/7
- Genre: Surf rock
- Label: (United States) One Louder Records (Australia) Au-Go-Go Records

Man or Astroman? chronology
UFO's and the Men Who Fly Them! (1996)	Intravenous Television Continuum (1996)	What Remains Inside a Black Hole (1996)

Intravenous Television Continuum is a full-length album released by the surf rock group Man or Astroman?. It is a collection of alternate mixes of previously released songs and a handful of TV show themes (The Jetsons, My Favorite Martian, etc.). The first pressing was available in 1996 on clear vinyl and opaque purple vinyl through One Louder Records. The following year, the CD was re-issued through Australia's Au-Go-Go Records. It was recorded at Zero Return in Elmore, Alabama sometime in 1994 and 1995. It features cover art and design by Shag. The 'thank you' section specifies that the band wished to "thank every organization and citizen on the planet Earth except John Esplen and One Louder Broadcasting."

== Track listing ==
1. "Immersion Static"
2. "Put Your Finger in the Socket (Maximum Voltage Version)"
3. "Nitrous Burn Out 2012"
4. "Tetsuwan Atomu"
5. "Max Q (Nielson Rating Video Version)"
6. "------ (Reverse Sync Moog Version)"
7. "Jetson's Theme"
8. "Invasion of the Dragonmen (Alternate Universe Mosrite Version)"
9. "Bionic Futures"
10. "Tomorrow Plus X (Time Travel Through Sleep Deprivation Mix)"
11. "Out of Limits"
12. "Calling Hong Kong" (Supernova)
13. "Munster's Theme"
14. "Principles Unknown"
15. "Everyone's Favorite Martian"
16. "Deuces Wild"
17. "Cool Your Jets"

== Lineup ==
- Star Crunch: High Voltage Power Supply, Ion Magnet
- Birdstuff: Horz OSC Tube
- Captain Zeno: Test Pattern Adjustment, Deflection Coil
- Coco the Electronic Monkey Wizard: Low Voltage Rectifier, Fuseable Resistor
