= Mission into Chaos! =

EP by Man or Astro-man?
- Released: 1993
- Recorded: Zero Return 1993
- Genre: Surf rock
- Label: One Louder Records

Man or Astro-man? chronology
Captain Holojoy's Space Diner (1993)	Mission into Chaos! (1993)	Man or Astro-man? vs. Europa (1993)

Mission into Chaos! is a Man or Astro-man? 7-inch EP released on One Louder Records in 1993 and pressed exclusively on black vinyl. The back cover states that the songs are meant to be a soundtrack to the film of the same title which has been lost.

== Track listing ==
=== Secret Agent Side ===
1. "Name of Numbers"
2. "Of Sex and Demise"

=== Double Agent Side ===
1. "Madness in the Streets"
2. "Within a Martian Heart"
3. "Point Blank"

== Line Up ==
- Star Crunch
- Birdstuff
- Dr. Deleto and His Invisible Vaportron
- Coco the Electronic Monkey Wizard
