= Uncanny Valley (Birds of Avalon album) =

Studio album by Birds of Avalon
- Released: June 23, 2009
- Genre: Progressive rock, psychedelic rock
- Length: 31:21
- Label: Volcom Entertainment

Birds of Avalon chronology
Outer Upper Inner (2008)	Uncanny Valley (2009)	Birds of Avalon (2011)

Professional ratings
Review scores
Source	Rating
AllMusic	3.5/5 stars

Uncanny Valley is the second full-length album by the Raleigh, North Carolina–based rock band Birds of Avalon. The album was released by Volcom Entertainment on June 23, 2009.

== Track listing ==
1. "Unkaany Valley" 0:23
2. "Side Two" 1:56
3. "I Never Knew" 2:44
4. "Your Downtime Is Up" 4:25
5. "Dadcage" 2:06
6. "Eyesore" 2:47
7. "Student Teaching" 2:24
8. "Spirit Lawyer" 3:04
9. "Last Rites (Funky Slide)" 3:16
10. "Peregrinations" 3:06
11. "Micro-Infinity" 5:10
