= Birds of Avalon =

- Origin: Raleigh, North Carolina, USA
- Genres: Psychedelic rock
- Years active: 2005–present
- Labels: Bladen County/ Gigantic Music, Third Uncle
- Members: Cheetie Kumar; David J. Mueller; Scott Nurkin; Paul Siler; Missy Thangs; Jason Alyward
- Website: birdsofavalon.com

Birds of Avalon is a rock band from Raleigh, North Carolina whose sound fuses elements of psychedelic and progressive rock. The band consists of Cheetie Kumar (guitar), David Mueller (bass), Scott Nurkin (drums), Paul Siler (guitar), Jason Alyward (drums) and Missy Thangs (keys).

The band was formed after guitarists Paul Siler and Cheetie Kumar split from The Cherry Valence to join forces with vocalist, Craig Tilley, and bassist, David Mueller. They soon enlisted Chapel Hill drummer/artist Scott Nurkin and quickly made a name for themselves after their ’07 Volcom debut Bazaar Bazaar, ’08′s follow-up EP Outer Upper Inner. The band has toured in support The Racontuers, The Flaming Lips, Black Mountain, The Fucking Champs, Mudhoney, Monotonix, and Ted Leo.

The band then retreated to their home and began an extensive period of writing and recording, using their rehearsal space at Kumar and Siler's house as a makeshift studio. Recordings done at the home resulted in band's second full-length album, Uncanny Valley, released in summer 2009 on Volcom Entertainment. The album was quickly recorded on an old 3M 16-track tape machine borrowed from Mitch Easter who, with Cheetie Kumar, mixed the record at Fidelitorium. The name Uncanny Valley comes from a theory which was introduced by Japanese roboticist, Masahiro Mori, in 1970 to describe the phenomena by which human beings become more unsettled by robots or other human facsimiles in direct proportion to how lifelike they appear.

Uncanny Valley was their final album for Volcom. It was recorded after actually completing another complete album just a couple of months previously. The band decided against releasing that one on Volcom feeling that the more spontaneous Uncanny Valley was a better match for the label.

Much of 2010 was a transitional time for the group. Paul and Cheetie, along with co-owners Steve Popson (Polvo) and Ben Barwick (Ashley Stove), re-opened live venue Kings Barcade. Siler also kept busy booking Raleigh’s inaugural and highly successful Hopscotch Music Festival. All this on the heels of the amicable departure of vocalist Craig Tilley afforded the band an opportunity to re-evaluate and evolve their sound with a focus on group harmonies and a freer approach to writing and performing.

In January 2011, the band released their third full length on Bladen County Records. The self-titled album, another analog-only collaboration with Mitch Easter (REM, Wilco, Pavement), draws on the pop-aesthetic of Bazaar Bazaar but blazes new progressive trails while anticipating the psychedelic experimentation of Uncanny Valley. Gigantic Music released the vinyl of the S/T LP in the Summer of 2011.

In 2015 Birds Of Avalon joined forces with Missy Thangs (The Love Language) and Jason Alyward (Valient Thorr) to include synth and a second drummer. The expanded sextet lineup released Disappearance (5-song EP) and Goin Under (7" single) in 2015, and Operator's Midnight (LP) in 2017, all on Third Uncle Records (Honey Radar, Queen of Jeans).

== Discography ==
- Bazaar Bazaar, LP (2007)
- Outer Upper Inner, EP (2008)
- Uncanny Valley, LP (2009)
- Birds of Avalon, LP (2011)
- Disappearance, EP (2015)
- Goin Under, 7" Single (2015)
- Live at Nice Price, Vol. 4, Cassette Release (2016)
- Operator's Midnight, LP (2017)
