= Art Chantry =

American graphic designer

Arthur S.W. Chantry II
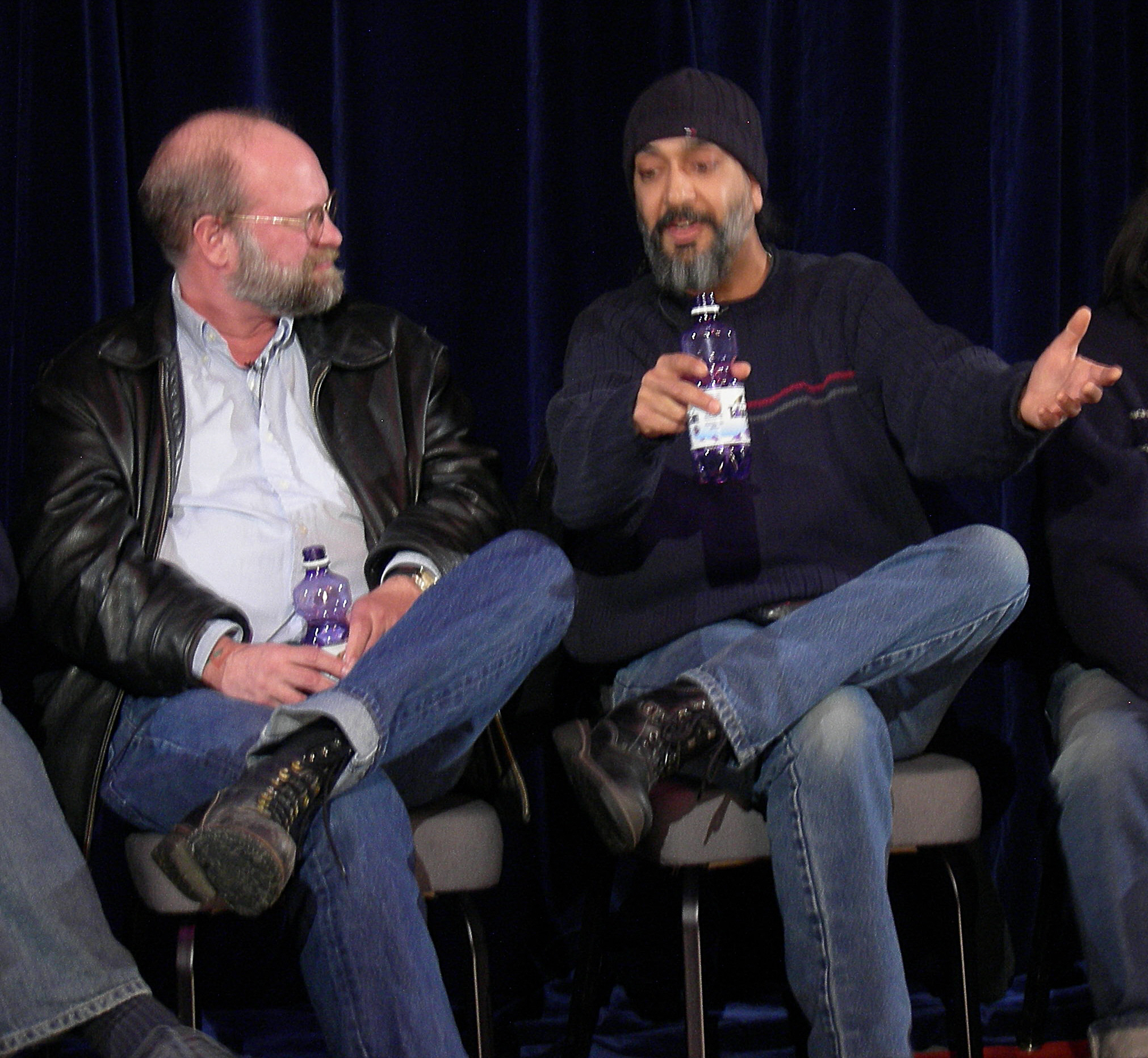
- Chantry (left) with Kim Thayil of Soundgarden, 2007
- Born: April 9, 1954 (age 72); Seattle, Washington
- Known for: Graphic design
- Notable work: Album covers for Mudhoney, Mono Men, Soundgarden, and The Sonics
- Awards: Exhibited at Rock and Roll Hall of Fame, Museum of Modern Art, the Smithsonian, and the Louvre, recipient of the 2017 AIGA Medal

Arthur Samuel Wilbur Chantry II (born April 9, 1954) is an American graphic designer. He is most known for posters and album cover designs for bands from the Pacific Northwest, such as Mudhoney, Mono Men, Soundgarden, and The Sonics.

== Biography ==
Chantry received a bachelor's degree from Western Washington University in 1978.

Chantry's designs are perhaps most closely associated with the Seattle, Washington-based Sub Pop Records and the Bellingham, Washington-based Estrus Records, for which he has worked with dozens of bands. He is also notable for his work in magazine and logo design. Chantry worked throughout the 1980s as art director at The Rocket, a Seattle-based music biweekly.

Chantry advocates a low-tech approach to design that is informed by the history of the field. His work has been exhibited at the Rock and Roll Hall of Fame, Museum of Modern Art, Seattle Art Museum, the Smithsonian, and the Louvre. Chantry builds his record, poster, and magazine designs by hand, eschewing the now-ubiquitous computer and laser printer for X-Acto knives, Xerox machines, and photoset type. His works can be seen both in places such as small record stores, as well as pages of establishment design magazines like Print or Communication Arts.

Some People Can't Surf: The Graphic Design of Art Chantry by Julie Lasky is a book released in 2001. The monograph explored Chantry's process crafting his graphic design.

Chantry is the author of the book Art Chantry Speaks: A Heretic's History of 20th Century Graphic Design, released in 2015.

Chantry is the recipient of the 2017 American Institute of Graphic Arts (AIGA) Medal.
