= Estrus Records =

- Estrus Records Logo 2005
- Founded: 1990
- Founder: Dave Crider
- Distributor: Touch and Go Records
- Genre: Punk, garage rock, rock and roll
- Country of origin: U.S.
- Location: Bellingham, Washington
- Official website: www.estrus.com

Estrus Records was an independent record label from Bellingham, Washington, that released surf, garage and "trash rock" music throughout the 1990s. The label was owned and operated by Dave Crider who played guitar in The Mono Men.

== History ==
Estrus Records released vinyl records and compact discs by such bands as: Mono Men, The Mummies, Man or Astro-man?, the Makers, 5.6.7.8's, Gas Huffer, Mooney Suzuki, Soledad Brothers, DMBQ, The Cherry Valence, Federation X, The Trashwomen, Tricky Woo, Untamed Youth, Immortal Lee County Killers, The Dexateens, The Go-Nuts, Marble Orchard, The Mortals, The Drags, Supercharger, Impala, Midnight Evils, Satan's Pilgrims, The Von Zippers, and Southern Culture on the Skids. Many of the album and single covers on the label were designed by poster artist and graphic designer Art Chantry. While it was in operation, Estrus Records released more than 450 different titles on vinyl and compact disc.

For many years Estrus hosted an annual festival, Garage Shock, at The 3B Tavern in Bellingham. Garage Shock featured bands from the label's roster, as well as others from around the world. The last Garage Shock, in 2001, was held at Emo's, in Austin, Texas.

In January 1997, the label's entire mail-order inventory, the owner's private record collection, and some band gear were destroyed in a warehouse fire. Benefit shows were held in multiple cities, titled "Fire Shock," to help the label and its owner recover financially from the fire.

== Retrospective book and podcast ==
At the start of 2020 work began on a book about Estrus Records to be published by Korero Press, titled Estrus: Shovelin’ the Shit Since ’87. A monthly podcast dedicated to Estrus Records called PodShock started to be broadcast in anticipation of the release of the book, in April 2020. Episode one featured Eric Friedl of The Oblivians and Goner Records along with members of The Fells. Episode two featured Mort of The Mono Men and Dave Holmes of The Fall-Outs. Estrus: Shovelin’ the Shit Since ’87 was published in a limited hardback edition on November 21, 2023, and was accompanied by book-signing events. The book was published in a softcover edition in 2025, was also accompanied by book-signing events.

== Releases ==
- 26 Excellennt Estrus Sizzlers (Estrus Records) (1999) - sampler
- Estrus 100% Apeshit Rock Sampler (Vol. 2) (Estrus Records) (2000)
- Estrus Double Dyn-O-Mite Sampler Vol. 3 (Estrus Records) (2002)

== See also ==
- List of record labels
