= Fear the Future Tour =

2017–18 concert tour by St. Vincent

- Tour by St. Vincent
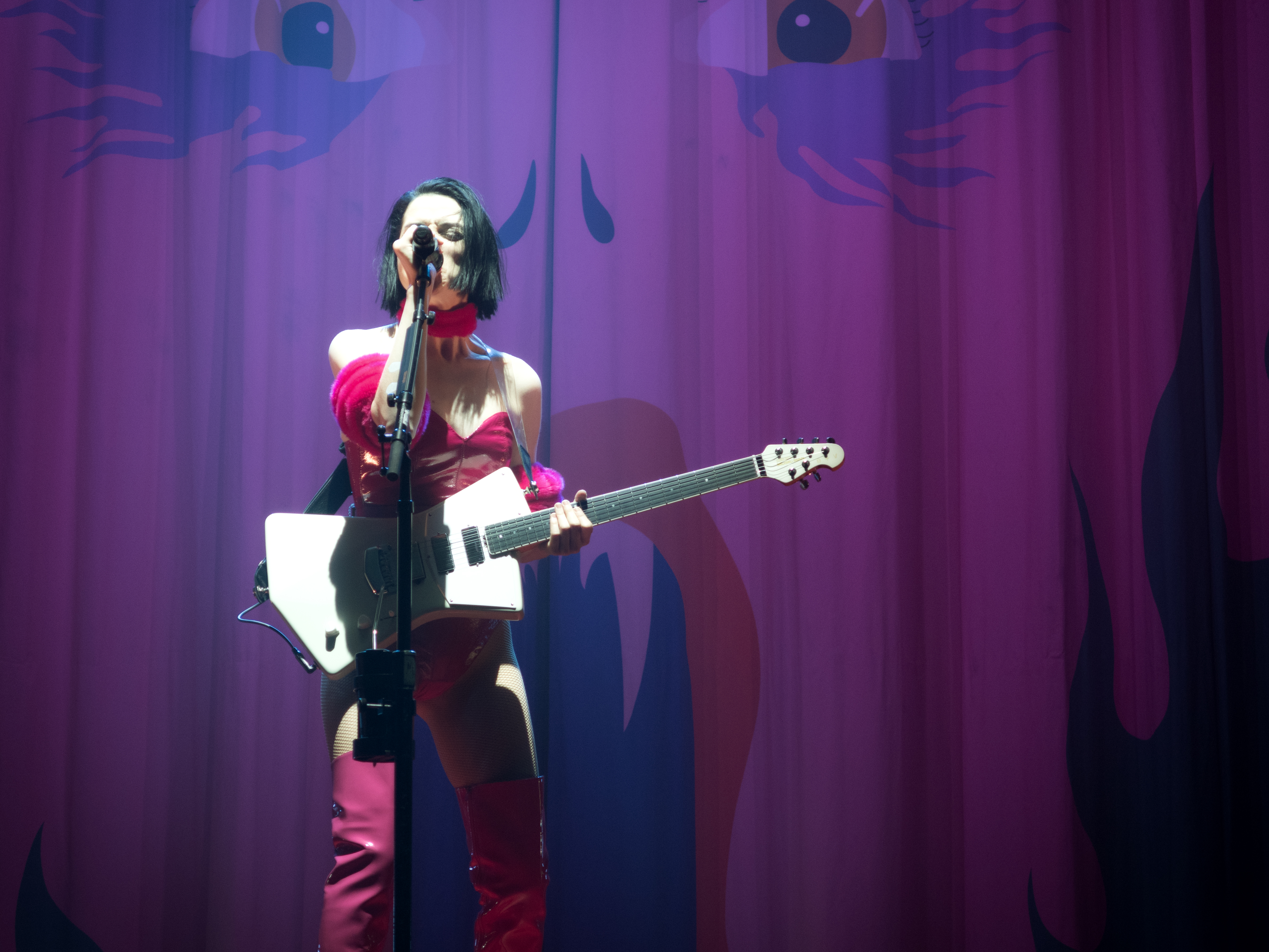
- St. Vincent performing during the tour
- Associated album: Masseduction
- Start date: October 7, 2017
- End date: February 26, 2018
- Legs: 3
- No. of shows: 38 in North America; 7 in Europe; 45 in total

St. Vincent concert chronology
- Digital Witness Tour (2014–15); Fear the Future Tour (2017–18); I Am a Lot Like You! Tour (2018–19)

The Fear the Future Tour was an international concert tour by American singer St. Vincent, which supported her fifth studio album Masseduction (2017). The tour started on October 7, 2017, in Los Angeles, United States and concluded on February 26, 2018 in Tulsa, United States. The production was unique in that St. Vincent performed it as a one-woman show, appearing solo onstage for the entirety of the set with no backing band. The show featured only her live guitar and vocals with an instrumental track.

== Background ==
After releasing her self-titled fourth studio album in 2014, Clark toured extensively during that year and 2015, entering on a hiatus of nearly two years thereafter. Even before any official announcement of the first single "New York" and the album Masseduction, on June 21, 2017, the singer announced the Fear the Future Tour, with a video titled "A Very Special Announcement" on YouTube and a press release containing the first dates in North America and Europe.

On November 6, 2017, Clark announced a new North American leg for 2018, with mainly East Coast dates.

== Set list ==
The following set list was obtained from the concert held on October 17, 2017, in London. It does not represent all concerts for the duration of the tour.

First act

1. "Marry Me"
2. "Now, Now"
3. "The Strangers"
4. "Actor Out of Work"
5. "Cruel"
6. "Cheeleader"
7. "Strange Mercy"
8. "Digital Witness"
9. "Rattlesnake"
10. "Birth in Reverse"

Second act: Masseduction

11. "Hang on Me"
12. "Pills"
13. "Masseduction"
14. "Sugarboy"
15. "Los Ageless"
16. "Happy Birthday, Johnny"
17. "Savior"
18. "New York"
19. "Fear the Future"
20. "Young Lover"
21. "Dancing with a Ghost"
22. "Slow Disco"
23. "Smoking Section"

== Tour dates ==
List of 2017 concerts
Date	City	Country	Venue
October 7	Los Angeles	United States	Paramount Pictures Studios
October 17	London	England	O_{2} Academy Brixton
October 18	Manchester	England	O_{2} Apollo Manchester
October 20	Dublin	Ireland	Olympia Theatre
October 23	Brussels	Belgium	Ancienne Belgique
October 24	Paris	France	Le Trianon
October 26	Berlin	Germany	Huxleys Neue Welt
October 27	Utrecht	Netherlands	TivoliVredenburg
November 14	Detroit	United States	The Fillmore Detroit
November 15	Indianapolis	United States	Egyptian Room
November 17	Milwaukee	United States	Riverside Theater
November 18	Saint Paul	United States	Palace Theatre
November 19	Kansas City	United States	Uptown Theater
November 20	St. Louis	United States	The Pageant
November 21	Louisville	United States	The Kentucky Center
November 22	Nashville	United States	Ryman Auditorium
November 24	Knoxville	United States	Tennessee Theatre
November 25	Durham	United States	Durham Performing Arts Center
November 27	Washington, D.C.	United States	The Anthem
November 28	Philadelphia	United States	Electric Factory
November 30	Boston	United States	House of Blues
December 1	Portland	United States	State Theatre
December 2	Brooklyn	United States	Kings Theatre
December 3	Brooklyn	United States	Kings Theatre
December 17 (Note: The concert on December 17, 2017, in Houston was a part of the Day for Night festival.)	Houston	United States	Downtown Houston Post Office

List of 2018 concerts
Date	City	Country	Venue
January 9	Pittsburgh	United States	Stage AE
January 10	Columbus	United States	Express Live!
January 11	Cincinnati	United States	Taft Theatre
January 12	Chicago	United States	Chicago Theatre
January 13	Omaha	United States	Peter Kiewit Concert Hall
January 15	Denver	United States	Fillmore Auditorium
January 19	Seattle	United States	Moore Theatre
January 20	Portland	United States	Keller Auditorium
January 22	San Francisco	United States	Bill Graham Civic Auditorium
January 25	Los Angeles	United States	Hollywood Palladium
January 26	Phoenix	United States	The Van Buren
January 27	San Diego	United States	The Observatory North Park
February 15	Asheville	United States	Thomas Wolfe Auditorium
February 17	Atlanta	United States	The Tabernacle
February 19	New Orleans	United States	Civic Theatre
February 20	Houston	United States	House of Blues
February 22	Austin	United States	Moody Theater
February 23	Austin	United States	Moody Theater
February 24	Dallas	United States	The Bomb Factory
February 26	Tulsa	United States	Cain's Ballroom

Cancelled shows

List of cancelled concerts
Date	City	Country	Venue	Reason
February 16, 2018	Chattanooga	United States	The Signal	Unforeseen Production and Scheduling Issues
February 18, 2018	Birmingham	United States	Iron City	Unforeseen Production and Scheduling Issues
March 4, 2018	Baltimore	United States	Hippodrome Theatre	Unforeseen Production and Scheduling Issues
