= I Am a Lot Like You! Tour =

2018–19 concert tour by St. Vincent

- Tour by St. Vincent
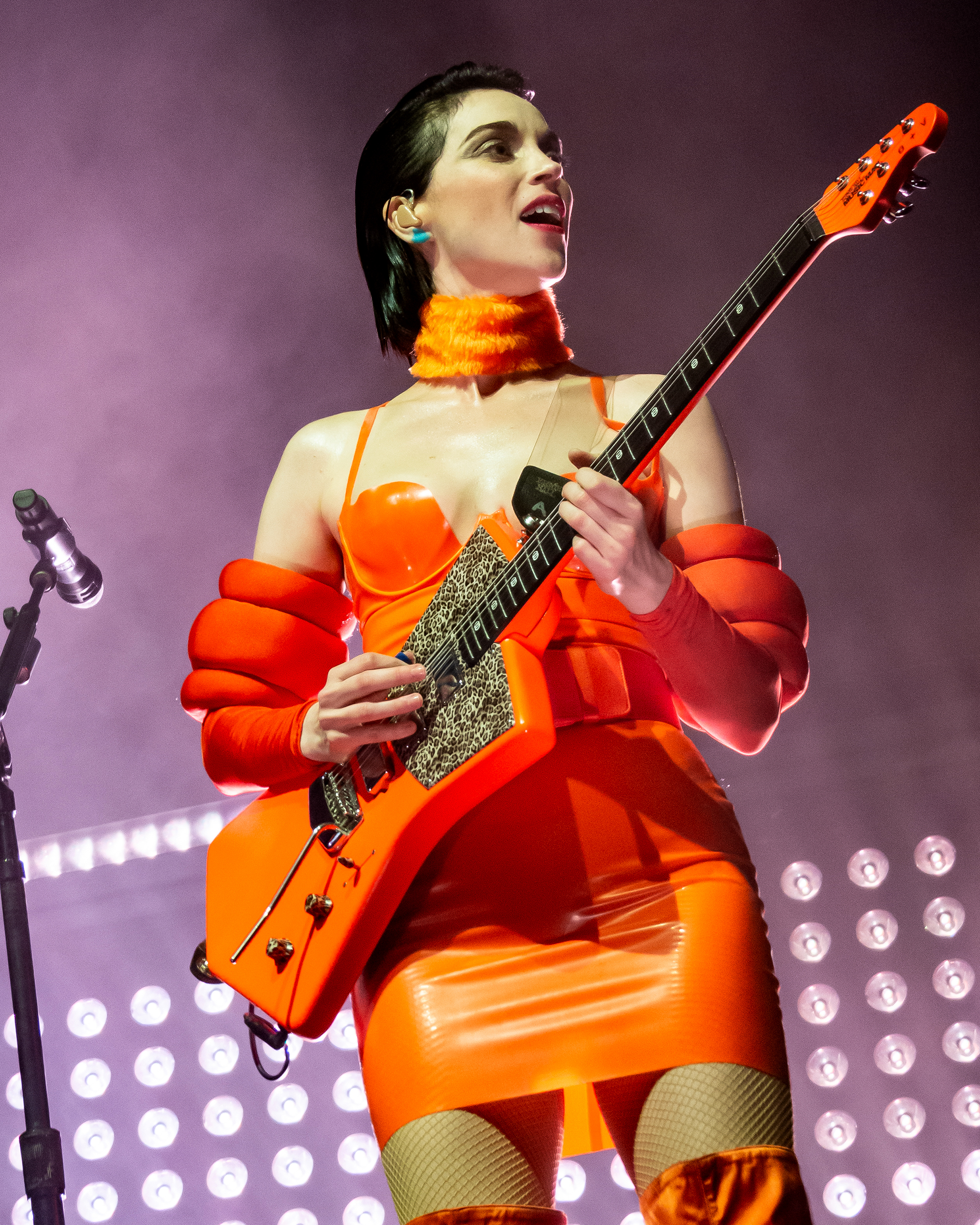
- St. Vincent performing during the tour
- Associated album: Masseduction
- Start date: April 5, 2018
- End date: April 7, 2019
- Legs: 10
- No. of shows: 31 in North America; 23 in Europe; 5 in South America; 2 in Oceania; 2 in Asia; 63 in total

St. Vincent concert chronology
- Fear the Future Tour (2017—18); I Am a Lot Like You! Tour (2018—19); Daddy's Home Tour (2021—22)

The I Am a Lot Like You! Tour was an international concert tour by American singer St. Vincent, which supported her fifth studio album Masseduction (2017). The tour started on April 5, 2018, in Mexico City, Mexico and concluded on April 7, 2019, in Bogotá, Colombia.

The I Am a Lot Like You Tour was a follow-up of the previous Fear the Future Tour, promoting the Masseduction album across the world, but a departure from the one-woman show presented in the last run, since this time there was a live backing band accompanying Clark.

The tour comprised mostly summer festivals, but also included some solo concerts and three rescheduled dates from the previous tour.

== Set list ==
This set list is from the April 5, 2019 concert at Lollapalooza in São Paulo, Brazil. It is not intended to represent all concerts for the tour.

1. "Sugarboy"
2. "Los Ageless"
3. "Pills"
4. "Savior"
5. "Masseduction"
6. "Marrow"
7. "Cheerleader"
8. "Digital Witness"
9. "Rattlesnake"
10. "Birth in Reverse"
11. "Fast Slow Disco"
12. "Fear the Future"
13. "New York"

== Tour dates ==
List of 2018 concerts
Date	City	Country	Venue
April 5 (Note: This concert was a supporting set for The Killers.)	Mexico City	Mexico	Foro Sol
April 7 (Note: This concert was a part of Festival Ceremonia.)	Toluca	Mexico	Foro Pegaso
April 11	Los Angeles	United States	Orpheum Theatre
April 13 (Note: These concerts were part of Coachella Festival.)	Indio	United States	Empire Polo Club
April 20	Indio	United States	Empire Polo Club
May 14	Austin	United States	Moody Theater
May 19 (Note: This concert was a part of Hangout Music Festival.)	Gulf Shores	United States	101 East Beach Boulevard
May 21	Charlotte	United States	The Fillmore Charlotte
May 22	Norfolk	United States	The NorVa
May 23	Richmond	United States	The National
May 25	Wilmington	United States	The Queen
May 26 (Note: This concert was a part of Boston Calling.)	Boston	United States	Harvard Athletic Complex
June 3 (Note: This concert was a part of All Points East.)	London	England	Victoria Park
June 15 (Note: This concert was a part of Dark Mofo.)	Hobart	Australia	MAC2
June 17 (Note: This concert was a part of Vivid Sydney.)	Sydney	Australia	Carriageworks
June 26 (Note: This concert was a part of INmusic Festival.)	Zagreb	Croatia	Lake Jarun
June 27	Milan	Italy	Circolo Magnolia
June 29 (Note: This concert was a part of Vida Festival.)	Vilanova i la Geltrú	Spain	Masia d'en Cabanyes
July 1 (Note: This concert was a part of Down the Rabbit Hole.)	Beuningen	Netherlands	Groene Heuvels
July 2	Hamburg	Germany	Markthalle Hamburg
July 4 (Note: This concert was a part of Roskilde Festival.)	Roskilde	Denmark	Festivalpladsen
July 6 (Note: This concert was a part of Pohoda Festival.)	Trenčín	Slovakia	Trenčín Airport
July 27 (Note: This concert was a part of Newport Folk Festival.)	Newport	United States	Fort Adams State Park
July 28 (Note: This concert was a part of Panorama Music Festival.)	New York City	United States	Randalls Island
July 29 (Note: This concert was a part of Mo Pop Festival.)	Detroit	United States	West Riverfront Park
July 31	Toronto	Canada	Sony Centre
August 3 (Note: This concert was a part of Osheaga Festival.)	Montreal	Canada	Parc Jean-Drapeau
August 4 (Note: This concert was a part of Lollapalooza.)	Chicago	United States	Grant Park
August 9 (Note: This concert was a part of Way Out West.)	Gothenburg	Sweden	Slottsskogen
August 10 (Note: This concert was a part of Øyafestivalen.)	Oslo	Norway	Tøyen Park
August 12 (Note: This concert was a part of Flow Festival.)	Helsinki	Finland	Suvilahti
August 18 (Note: These concerts were part of Summer Sonic Festival.)	Osaka	Japan	Maishima Sports Island
August 19	Chiba	Japan	Makuhari Messe
August 26 (Note: This concert was a part of Edinburgh International Festival.)	Edinburgh	Scotland	Edinburgh Playhouse
August 28	Leeds	England	O_{2} Academy Leeds
August 29	Cambridge	England	Cambridge Corn Exchange
August 31 (Note: This concert was a part of End of the Road Festival.)	Wiltshire	England	Larmer Tree Gardens
September 2 (Note: This concert was a part of Electric Picnic.)	Stradbally	Ireland	Stradbally Hall
September 8 (Note: This concert was a part of Skookum Festival.)	Vancouver	Canada	Stanley Park
September 10 (Note: These concerts were supporting sets for Florence and the Machine.)	Seattle	United States	KeyArena
September 11	Portland	United States	Moda Center
September 14	West Valley City	United States	Maverik Center
September 16 (Note: This concert was a part of Grandoozy Festival.)	Denver	United States	Overland Park
September 21 (Note: This concert was a part of Trans-Pecos Festival.)	Marfa	United States	El Cosmico
September 22 (Note: This concert was a part of Life Is Beautiful.)	Las Vegas	United States	Downtown Las Vegas
October 5	Austin	United States	Stubb's Bar-B-Q
October 6 (Note: These concerts were part of Austin City Limits Music Festival.)	Austin	United States	Zilker Park
October 14	Austin	United States	Zilker Park
October 19 (Note: This concert was a part of Tecate Coordenada.)	Guadalajara	Mexico	Parque Tresloma
October 20 (Note: This concert was a part of Tecate Live Out.)	Monterrey	Mexico	Fundidora Park
October 29	Los Angeles	United States	Hollywood Palladium

List of 2019 concerts
Date	City	Country	Venue
March 30 (Note: This concert was a part of Lollapalooza Argentina.)	Buenos Aires	Argentina	Hipódromo de San Isidro
March 31 (Note: This concert was a part of Lollapalooza Chile.)	Santiago	Chile	O'Higgins Park
April 4	São Paulo	Brazil	Cine Jóia
April 5 (Note: This concert was a part of Lollapalooza Brazil.)	São Paulo	Brazil	Autódromo José Carlos Pace
April 7 (Note: This concert was a part of Estéreo Picnic Festival.)	Bogotá	Colombia	Campo de Golf Briceño 18
