= Masseduction =

2017 studio album by St. Vincent

Studio album by St. Vincent
- Released: October 13, 2017
- Studios: Electric Lady (New York); Rough Consumer (Brooklyn) (Note: Additional recording); Compound Fracture (Los Angeles)
- Genres: Pop; electropop; art pop; glam rock; new wave
- Length: 41:36
- Label: Loma Vista
- Producers: Jack Antonoff; St. Vincent; Lars Stalfors

St. Vincent chronology
| St. Vincent (2014) | Masseduction (2017) | MassEducation (2018) |

Singles from Masseduction
- 1. "New York" Released: June 30, 2017; 2. "Los Ageless" Released: September 6, 2017; 3. "Pills" Released: October 10, 2017; 4. "Masseduction" Released: April 23, 2018

Masseduction is the fifth studio album by American musician St. Vincent, released on October 13, 2017, through Loma Vista Recordings. The album peaked at number 10 on the Billboard 200, becoming her first top ten album in the United States. The album was widely praised and was the fourth-most mentioned in critics' year-end lists for 2017. At the 61st Annual Grammy Awards, Masseduction won the award for Best Recording Package and Best Rock Song for its title track, and was also nominated for the Best Alternative Music Album.

== Release and promotion ==
"New York" was released as the lead single from the album on June 30, 2017. The album was announced on September 6 along with a pre-order and the release of the second single, "Los Ageless". The announcement was followed by a series of cryptic, satirical promotional clips Clark (St. Vincent) posted to her social media. Clark hosted a press conference on Facebook Live to announce the album, which was in the style of the sarcastic earlier clips. "Pills" was released as the third single on October 10. The album was promoted on two different tours: the Fear the Future Tour saw St. Vincent performing solo to prerecorded tracks in theatres, while the I Am a Lot Like You! Tour saw her performing with her band mostly in festivals around the world.

== Recording ==
The album was produced by Clark and Jack Antonoff at Electric Lady Studios in Manhattan, with additional recording at Rough Consumer Studio in Brooklyn, and Compound Fracture in Los Angeles. It features contributions from Doveman on piano, Kamasi Washington on saxophone, Jenny Lewis on guest vocals, and beat production from Sounwave, as well as pedal steel by Greg Leisz and Rich Hinman, and additional guitar and vocals from her uncle and aunt Tuck & Patti, respectively. Model and actress Cara Delevingne, whom Clark had dated before they split in 2016, provided back-up vocals.

== Music and lyrics ==
Masseduction has been described as the "culmination of years of writing, with songs crafted from voice memos, text messages, and snippets of melodies that came to Clark while traveling the globe." Clark has stated that the album focuses on themes of power, sex, drugs, sadness, imperiled relationships and death. In a press release, she stated: "every record I make has an archetype. Strange Mercy was Housewives on Pills. St. Vincent was Near-Future Cult Leader. Masseduction is different, it's pretty first person. You can't fact-check it, but if you want to know about my life, listen to this record."

Musically, the album has been characterized as "futuristic" pop, electropop, art pop, glam rock and new wave, while also incorporating ambient rock, "industrial-tinted techno", psychedelic rock, electronic rock and dream pop. It consists of guitar and piano, synths and strings, and drum beats "that punch with purpose".

== Critical reception ==
Professional ratings
Aggregate scores
| Source | Rating |
|---|---|
| AnyDecentMusic? | 8.4/10 |
| Metacritic | 88/100 |
Review scores
| Source | Rating |
| AllMusic | 5/5 stars |
| The A.V. Club | A |
| Chicago Tribune | 3.5/4 stars |
| Entertainment Weekly | A− |
| The Guardian | 4/5 stars |
| The Independent | 4/5 stars |
| NME | 4/5 stars |
| Pitchfork | 7.6/10 |
| Rolling Stone | 4/5 stars |
| Vice (Expert Witness) | B+ |

At Metacritic, which assigns a normalized rating out of 100 to reviews from mainstream publications, the album received an average score of 88, based on 38 reviews. According to the site, the album was the fourth-most mentioned in critics' year-end lists for 2017. John Murphy of musicOMH praised the album, saying "it's clear that Clark has not only raised the bar but moved it several notches up. Masseduction is a remarkable record, a certain contender for album of the year and demonstrable proof that Clark is an artist working at the height of her powers", continuing: "Masseduction is nothing less than an absolutely towering achievement. A year after we all mourned the loss of creative geniuses like David Bowie and Prince, we should be thankful that one of their spiritual successors in Annie Clark is on fine form."

El Hunt of DIY wrote, "Along with the equally exceptional St. Vincent which came before it, this is the moment that St. Vincent enters the fabled realm reserved for the greats." Claire Biddles of The Line of Best Fit stated that "ultimately, Masseduction defies explanation and critique, rendering the critic a dead weight in the dust of its ever-accelerating sucker-punch of ideas." Drowned in Sound's Jude Clarke said, "You wouldn't want one track or note to be changed or left out. It's a genuine masterpiece: complex, funny, sexy, bleak, uplifting, inspiring and enthralling from start to finish." AllMusic critic Heather Phares said "Masseduction delivers sketches of chaos with stunning clarity. It's the work of an always savvy artist at her wittiest and saddest." The A.V. Club's Annie Zaleski wrote that Clark "perfects her fractured, futuristic pop vision on Masseduction" and that she "captures this emotional roller-coaster in her remarkably genre-agnostic music".

The record made many appearances on best of the decades list. Uproxx listed Masseduction as the 14th best pop album of the 2010s.

=== Accolades ===
Masseduction appeared on multiple year-end lists in 2017.

| Publication | Rank | Ref. |
|---|---|---|
| The A.V. Club | 2 | |
| Billboard | 12 | |
| Crack Magazine | 40 | |
| Dazed | 13 | |
| Drowned in Sound | 4 | |
| Entertainment Weekly | 4 | |
| Exclaim | 8 | |
| Fuse | 5 | |
| The Guardian | 1 | |
| Les InRocks | 25 | |
| Mashable | 8 | |
| New York Daily News | 11 | |
| NME | 11 | |
| Noisey | 9 | |
| NOW | 10 | |
| Paste | 34 | |
| Pazz & Jop | 3 | |
| Pitchfork | 22 | |
| Q | 6 | |
| Rolling Stone | 18 | |
| Stereogum | 14 | |
| The New York Times (by Jon Pareles) | 1 | |
| The Skinny | 13 | |
| Slant Magazine | 2 | |
| USA Today | 7 | |
| Vinyl Me, Please | 2 | |

== Commercial performance ==
In the United States, Masseduction debuted at number 10 on the Billboard 200, becoming St. Vincent's first album to peak in the top ten of the chart. It sold 29,000 units in its first week, 25,000 of which were in traditional album sales. The album debuted at number six in the UK, selling 7,610 copies including streaming.

== Track listing ==
Credits adapted from the album's liner notes.

All tracks are written by Annie Clark, except where noted.

| No. | Title | Writer(s) | Length |
|---|---|---|---|
| 1. | "Hang on Me" | | 2:48 |
| 2. | "Pills" | Clark; Jack Antonoff; Mark Anthony Spears | 4:40 |
| 3. | "Masseduction" | Clark; Antonoff | 3:17 |
| 4. | "Sugarboy" | Clark; Antonoff | 4:01 |
| 5. | "Los Ageless" | | 4:41 |
| 6. | "Happy Birthday, Johnny" | Clark; Antonoff | 2:58 |
| 7. | "Savior" | | 3:26 |
| 8. | "New York" | Clark; Antonoff | 2:34 |
| 9. | "Fear the Future" | | 2:31 |
| 10. | "Young Lover" | | 3:33 |
| 11. | "Dancing with a Ghost" | | 0:46 |
| 12. | "Slow Disco" | Clark; Joy Williams | 2:44 |
| 13. | "Smoking Section" | | 3:37 |
| Total length: | | | 41:36 |

Japanese edition bonus track
| No. | Title | Length |
|---|---|---|
| 14. | "政権腐敗 (Power Corrupts)" | 3:11 |
| Total length: | | 44:47 |

== Personnel ==
Credits adapted from the liner notes of Masseduction.

=== Musicians ===
- Annie Clark – guitar (tracks 1–5, 7, 9, 10, 13), vocals (all tracks), synthesizers (track 4), bass (track 4)
- Tuck Andress – guitar (tracks 5, 7, 9)
- Patti Andress – vocals (tracks 5, 7, 13)
- Jenny Lewis – vocals (track 2)
- Kid Monkey – vocals (track 2)
- Toko Yasuda – vocals (track 3)
- Jack Antonoff – synthesizers (tracks 2, 4–6, 8–13), programming (tracks 1–5, 7–9, 12, 13), bass (tracks 1, 2), drums (tracks 2, 9), string arrangements (tracks 11, 12), mellotron (track 1), piano (track 2)
- Daniel Mintseris – synthesizers (tracks 2, 7, 9)
- Lars Stalfors – synthesizers (track 10), programming (track 10)
- Sounwave – programming (track 2)
- Adam Pickrell – programming (track 2)
- Thomas Bartlett – piano (tracks 1, 3, 6–8, 13), synthesizers (track 9)
- Bobby Sparks – keyboards (track 7)
- Mike Elizondo – bass (tracks 2, 9)
- Pino Palladino – bass (track 7)
- Greg Leisz – pedal steel (tracks 5–7, 13)
- Rich Hinman – pedal steel (track 13)
- Evan Smith – saxophone (tracks 2, 5, 11, 12)
- Kamasi Washington – saxophone (track 2)
- Margot – strings (tracks 11, 12)
- Philip A. Peterson – cello (track 8)
- Timothy Garland – violin (track 8)

=== Technical ===
- Jack Antonoff – production, additional engineering
- St. Vincent – production, additional engineering
- Lars Stalfors – co-production (tracks 3, 10)
- Laura Sisk – engineering
- Sean Cook – additional engineering
- John Congleton – additional production (tracks 2, 7, 9)
- Brent Arrowood – additional engineering (tracks 2, 9)
- Alonzo Lazaro – additional engineering (tracks 2, 9)
- Miro Mackie – additional engineering (track 3)
- Tom Elmhirst – mixing (tracks 1, 2, 4–8, 11–13)
- Catherine Marks – mixing (tracks 3, 9, 10)
- Brandon Boost – mix engineering (tracks 1, 2, 4–8, 11–13)
- Caesar Edmunds – mix engineering (tracks 3, 9, 10)
- Chris Gehringer – mastering

=== Artwork ===
- Willo Perron & Associates – creative direction
- NONOT – package design
- Nedda Afsari – photography

== Charts ==
Chart performance for Masseduction
| Chart (2017) | Peak position |
|---|---|
| Australian Albums (ARIA) | 19 |
| Austrian Albums (Ö3 Austria) | 53 |
| Belgian Albums (Ultratop Flanders) | 36 |
| Belgian Albums (Ultratop Wallonia) | 56 |
| Canadian Albums (Billboard) | 31 |
| Czech Albums (ČNS IFPI) | 61 |
| Dutch Albums (Album Top 100) | 42 |
| French Albums (SNEP) | 119 |
| German Albums (Offizielle Top 100) | 82 |
| Greek Albums (IFPI) | 69 |
| Irish Albums (IRMA) | 5 |
| Italian Albums (FIMI) | 52 |
| New Zealand Heatseeker Albums (RMNZ) | 1 |
| Portuguese Albums (AFP) | 27 |
| Scottish Albums (Official Charts) | 5 |
| Spanish Albums (Promusicae) | 76 |
| Swiss Albums (Schweizer Hitparade) | 26 |
| UK Albums (Official Charts) | 6 |
| US Billboard 200 | 10 |
| US Top Alternative Albums (Billboard) | 3 |
| US Top Rock Albums (Billboard) | 3 |

== MassEducation ==
MassEducation

Remix album by St. Vincent
- Released: October 12, 2018
- Recorded: August 2017
- Studio: Reservoir (New York)
- Length: 44:58
- Label: Loma Vista
- Producers: St. Vincent; Thomas Bartlett

St. Vincent chronology
| Masseduction (2017) | MassEducation (2018) | Nina Kraviz Presents Masseduction Rewired (2019) |

Singles from MassEducation
- 1. "Slow Slow Disco" Released: September 29, 2018

Professional ratings
Aggregate scores
| Source | Rating |
|---|---|
| Metacritic | 80/100 |
Review scores
| Source | Rating |
| AllMusic | 4/5 stars |
| Clash | 7/10 |
| Entertainment Weekly | B+ |
| Exclaim! | 7/10 |
| The Irish Times | 4/5 stars |
| The Line of Best Fit | 9.5/10 |
| Pitchfork | 7.2/10 |
| Rolling Stone | 3.5/5 stars |

MassEducation is an acoustic reworking of Masseduction, released on October 12, 2018, by Loma Vista Recordings. It was recorded with pianist Thomas Bartlett over two days during mixing sessions of Masseduction, and features sparse piano-driven renditions of the album's songs. It was promoted by a reworking of "Slow Disco" entitled "Slow Slow Disco".

=== Track listing ===
All tracks are written by Annie Clark, except where noted. All tracks are noted as "piano version".

| No. | Title | Length |
|---|---|---|
| 1. | "Slow Disco" (Annie Clark, Joy Williams) | 2:30 |
| 2. | "Savior" | 4:18 |
| 3. | "Masseduction" (Clark, Jack Antonoff) | 3:40 |
| 4. | "Sugarboy" (Clark, Antonoff) | 3:50 |
| 5. | "Fear the Future" | 2:20 |
| 6. | "Smoking Section" | 4:10 |
| 7. | "Los Ageless" | 5:14 |
| 8. | "New York" (Clark, Antonoff) | 2:48 |
| 9. | "Young Lover" | 4:50 |
| 10. | "Happy Birthday, Johnny" (Clark, Antonoff) | 3:24 |
| 11. | "Pills" (Clark, Antonoff, Mark Anthony Spears) | 5:00 |
| 12. | "Hang on Me" | 2:54 |
| Total length: | | 44:58 |

=== Personnel ===
- Annie Clark – vocals, production
- Thomas Bartlett – piano, production
- Pat Dillett – recording, mixing
- Chris Gehringer – mastering
- Greg Leisz – pedal steel
- Pamela Neal – photography
- Carrie Smith – package design

=== Charts ===
| Chart (2018) | Peak position |
|---|---|
| Belgian Albums (Ultratop Flanders) | 195 |
| Scottish Albums (Official Charts) | 36 |
| UK Albums (Official Charts) | 81 |
| US Top Album Sales (Billboard) | 71 |

== Nina Kraviz Presents Masseduction Rewired ==
Nina Kraviz Presents Masseduction Rewired

Remix album by St. Vincent
- Released: December 13, 2019
- Label: Loma Vista

St. Vincent chronology
| MassEducation (2018) | Nina Kraviz Presents Masseduction Rewired (2019) | Daddy's Home (2021) |

Singles from Nina Kraviz Presents Masseduction Rewired
- 1. "New York (Nina Kraviz Vocal Mix)" Released: October 11, 2019; 2. "Slow Disco (EOD Remix)" Released: October 24, 2019; 3. "Pills (Population One Remix)" Released: November 7, 2019; 4. "Smoking Section (Jlin Remix)" Released: November 21, 2019; 5. "Dancing with a Ghost (Pearson Sound Remix)" Released: December 5, 2019

Nina Kraviz Presents Masseduction Rewired is a remix album curated by Russian DJ Nina Kraviz. It features remixes of Masseduction tracks from a variety of producers including Jlin, Laurel Halo, Population One, Midland, Pearson Sound and Kraviz. It was released by Loma Vista on December 13, 2019.

=== Track listing ===
| No. | Title | Remix | Length |
|---|---|---|---|
| 1. | "Hang on Me" | Batu Remix |
| 2. | "Pills" | Bjarki Remix |
| 3. | "Pills" | Population One Remix |
| 4. | "Pills" | PTU Remix |
| 5. | "Masseduction" | Midland's Mass Seduction Remix |
| 6. | "Sugarboy" | Emika Allegiance Remix |
| 7. | "Sugarboy" | ChicagoPhonic Sound System Remix by Hieroglyphic Being |
| 8. | "Los Ageless" | EOD Remix |
| 9. | "Happy Birthday, Johnny" | Fred P Remix |
| 10. | "Savior" | Buttechno Remix |
| 11. | "New York" | Nina Kraviz Vocal Mix | 5:14 |
| 12. | "New York" | Nina Kraviz x Lucy Dubbed Out Mix |
| 13. | "Fear the Future" | PTU Remix |
| 14. | "Young Lover" | Laurel Halo Remix |
| 15. | "Young Lover" | Roma Zuckerman Remix |
| 16. | "Dancing with a Ghost" | Pearson Sound Remix |
| 17. | "Slow Disco" | EOD Remix |
| 18. | "Slow Disco" | Nina Kraviz Gabber Me Gently Remix |
| 19. | "Smoking Section" | Jlin Remix |
| 20. | "Smoking Section" | Mala Remix |
| 21. | "Fast Slow Disco" | Steffi Remix |
