= Paradise Found =

Paradise Found may refer to:

- Paradise Found (film), 2003 biographical film
- Paradise Found (musical), 2010 London musical
- Paradise Found (album), a 1998 album by Tuck & Patti
- "Paradise Found", song from the 2009 Pixar film Up
- "Paradise Found", 1979 song by Amii Stewart on the album Paradise Bird
- "Paradise Found", 2017 song by Shawn Austin
- "Paradise Found/Luck Before You Leap", episode of Iggy Arbuckle

== See also ==
- Paradise Regained, a 1671 poem by John Milton
