= St. Vincent (musician) =

American musician (born 1982)

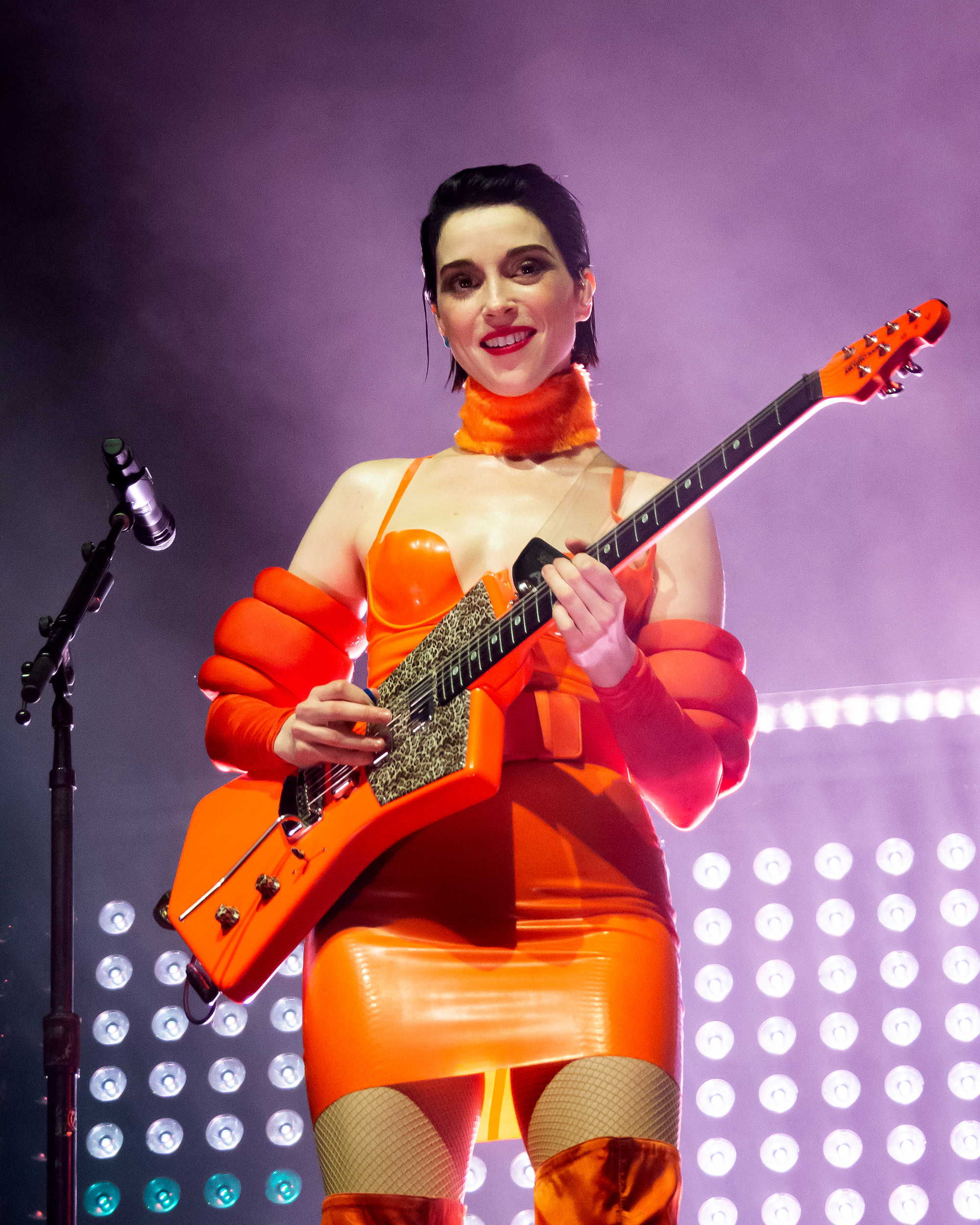
- St. Vincent at the Hollywood Palladium in 2018

Background information
- Also known as: Annie Clark
- Born: Anne Erin Clark; September 28, 1982 (age 44); Tulsa, Oklahoma, U.S.
- Origin: Dallas, Texas, U.S.
- Genres: Rock; pop; art rock; indie rock
- Occupations: Musician; singer-songwriter; record producer
- Instruments: Vocals; guitar; bass; keyboards; theremin; percussion
- Years active: 2003–present
- Labels: Beggars Banquet; 4AD; Loma Vista; Republic; Caroline; Total Pleasure Records
- Formerly of: The Polyphonic Spree
- Website: ilovestvincent.com

Anne Erin Clark (born September 28, 1982), known professionally as St. Vincent, is an American musician and singer-songwriter. Her guitar-playing has been praised for its melodic style and use of distortion. In 2023, Rolling Stone named Clark the 26th-greatest guitarist of all time.

Raised in Dallas, St. Vincent began her music career as a member of choral rock band the Polyphonic Spree. She was also a member of Sufjan Stevens' touring band before forming her own band in 2006. Her debut solo studio album, Marry Me, was released in 2007; it was followed by Actor (2009) and Strange Mercy (2011). In 2012, St. Vincent released Love This Giant, an album made in collaboration with David Byrne of Talking Heads. Her fourth studio album, St. Vincent (2014), received widespread acclaim from critics and was named album of the year by Slant Magazine, NME, The Guardian and Entertainment Weekly. She collaborated with producer and songwriter Jack Antonoff for her albums Masseduction (2017) and Daddy's Home (2021) and self-produced her seventh studio album All Born Screaming (2024).

St. Vincent produced Sleater-Kinney's ninth studio album The Center Won't Hold (2019) and co-wrote Taylor Swift's Billboard Hot 100 number-one single "Cruel Summer". She also directed a segment in the horror anthology film XX (2017), and co-wrote and starred in the psychological thriller film The Nowhere Inn (2020). Her accolades include six Grammy Awards, three of which are for Best Alternative Music Album, tying the record for wins in that category.

== Early life ==
Clark was born in Tulsa, Oklahoma, on September 28, 1982, to Sharon Christine and Richard "Rick" Clark. Her mother is a social worker and administrator for a nonprofit organization, and her stepfather works in corporate tax administration. Her parents divorced when she was 3, and when she was 7, she moved with her mother and two older sisters to Dallas, Texas. She has said that a 23andMe DNA test revealed her ancestry to be 80% Irish and 20% Ashkenazi Jewish, via one of her grandmothers. Clark was raised Catholic and Unitarian Universalist.

Clark has four brothers and four sisters from her parents' blended families.

As a child, Clark was fond of Ritchie Valens and the movie La Bamba. When she was five, her mother gave her a red plastic guitar from a Target store for Christmas. She began playing her first real guitar at age 12, taking classes with Tony Hyatt, a local guitar shop employee, and worked some of her teenage years as a roadie for her aunt and uncle, the guitar-vocal jazz duo Tuck & Patti. In 2001, she graduated from Lake Highlands High School, where she participated in theater and the school's jazz band, and was a classmate of actor Mark Salling.

She attended the Berklee College of Music in Boston, Massachusetts, studying with professor Lauren Passarelli. She left after three years, feeling that art institutions such as Berklee were sometimes focused more on the aesthetics of art than the product. In retrospect, she said, "I think that with music school and art school, or school in any form, there has to be some system of grading and measurement. The things they can teach you are quantifiable. While all that is good and has its place, at some point you have to learn all you can and then forget everything that you learned in order to actually start making music."

== Career ==
=== 2003–2007: Career beginnings and Marry Me ===
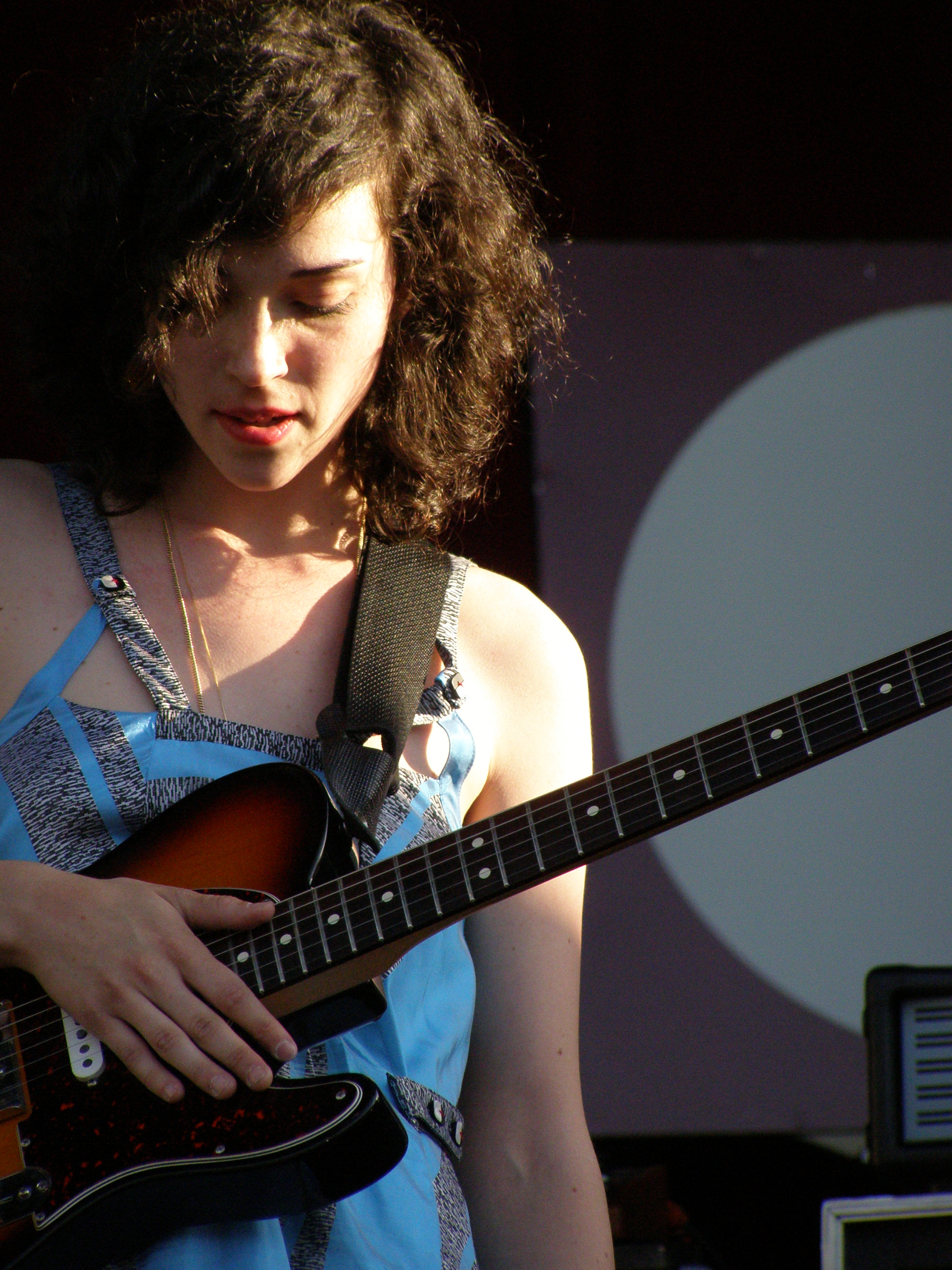
Clark on stage in 2007 during her Marry Me Tour

In 2003, Clark released an EP with fellow Berklee students entitled Ratsliveonnoevilstar. She also worked with Heavy Rotation Records, where "she revealed a much more private and intimate rendering of 'Count' for Dorm Sessions Vol. 1" and studied with professor of guitar Lauren Passarelli. Shortly after leaving Berklee, she returned home to Texas, where she joined the Polyphonic Spree just before they embarked on a European tour. In 2004, she joined Glenn Branca's 100-guitar orchestra for the Queens performance, and she was also briefly in a noise rock band called the Skull Fuckers. Clark left the Polyphonic Spree and joined Sufjan Stevens' touring band in 2006. During this period, she recorded and released an EP titled Paris Is Burning (2006).

In 2006, she began recording a studio album under the stage name St. Vincent. In an interview on The Colbert Report, she said that she "took [her] moniker from a line in a Nick Cave song" that referred to the hospital where Dylan Thomas died: "And Dylan Thomas died drunk in / St. Vincent's hospital" (from Cave's song "There She Goes, My Beautiful World", from the 2004 album Abattoir Blues / The Lyre of Orpheus). The name is also a reference to her great-grandmother, whose middle name was St. Vincent. Clark released her debut album, Marry Me, on July 10, 2007, on Beggars Banquet Records. The album was named after a line from the television sitcom Arrested Development.

The album was well received by critics, who compared Clark to the likes of Kate Bush and David Bowie and lauded the album for its arrangements, themes and style. In their review, The A.V. Club said: "There's a point where too much happiness turns into madness, and St. Vincent's multi-instrumentalist Annie Clark knows this place well". Pitchfork said, "At every turn Marry Me takes the more challenging route of twisting already twisted structures and unusual instrumentation to make them sound perfectly natural and, most importantly, easy to listen to as she overdubs her thrillingly sui generis vision into vibrant life." The songs on Marry Me were written largely when Clark was 18 and 19, and, she says, "represented a more idealized version of what life was or what love was or anything in the eyes of someone who hadn't really experienced anything". The album yielded one single, "Paris Is Burning", and a music video was produced for "Jesus Saves, I Spend".

=== 2008–2010: Actor and soundtracks ===
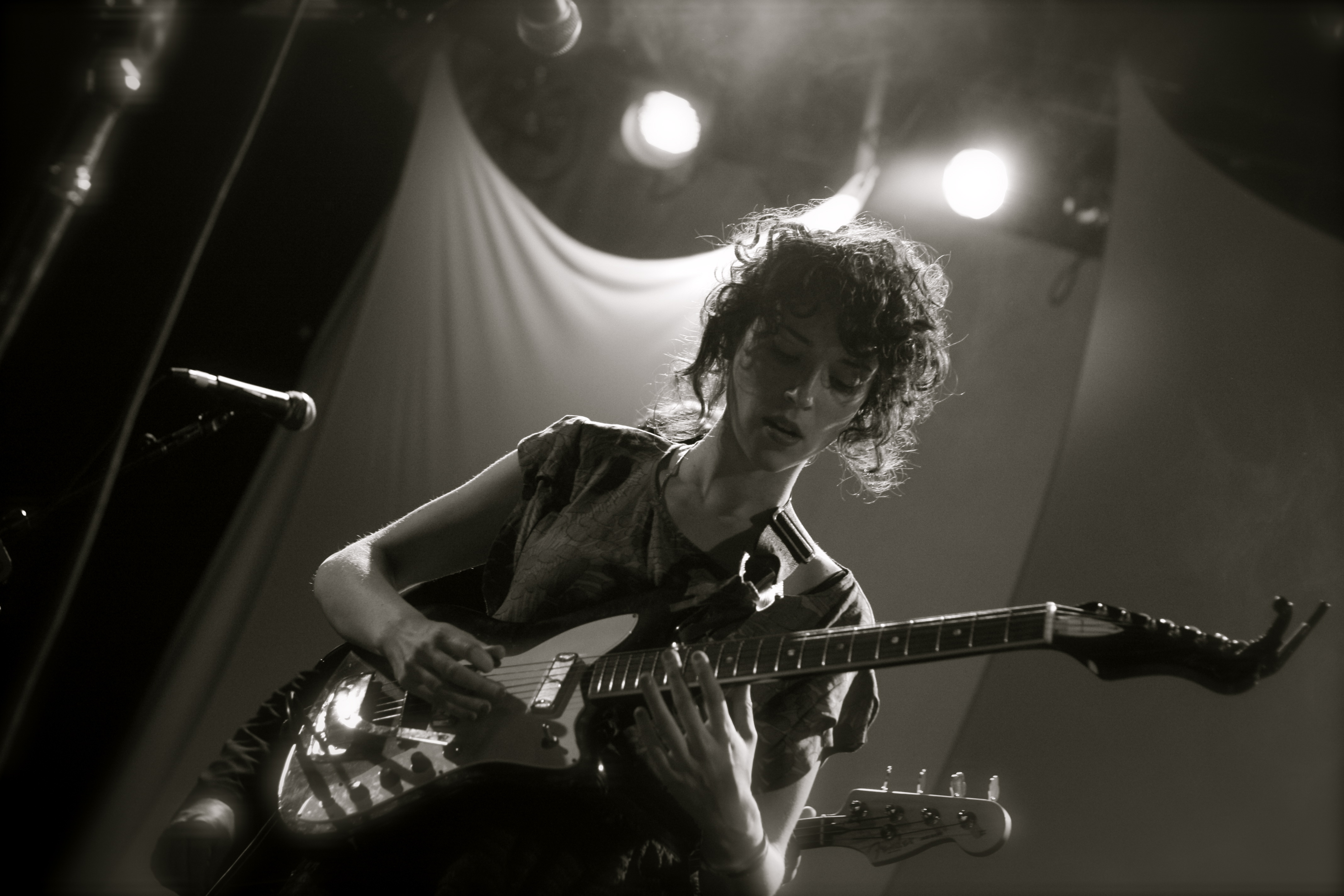
St. Vincent performing in 2009 during the Actor Tour

In 2008, Clark was nominated for three PLUG Independent Music Awards: New Artist of the Year, Female Artist of the Year, and Music Video of the Year. On March 6, 2008, she won the PLUG Female Artist of the Year award. After returning to New York from a lengthy tour, Clark began working on her second album. Her inspiration reportedly came from several films, including Disney movies: "Well, the truth is that I had come back from a pretty long — you know, about a year-and-a-half of touring, and so my brain was sort of all circuit boards that were a little bit fried", Clark said. "So I started watching films as sort of a way to get back into being human. And then it started to just really inform the entire record." Clark, who did not have a studio at the time, began writing the album in her apartment on her computer using GarageBand and MIDI, because she had gotten noise complaints from neighbors. The songs were inspired largely by scenes from various children's films. Clark said she imagined soundtracks for certain scenes in films when writing the music and lyrics, including scenes in Snow White (1937) and The Wizard of Oz (1939).

Her second album, Actor, was released by 4AD Records on May 5, 2009. It was also well received and gained more commercial attention than its predecessor. Spin gave the album eight out of ten stars, noting its "[juxtaposition of] the cruel and the kind, and here, the baroque arrangements are even more complex and her voice even prettier, with both only underlining the dark currents running through her songs". Entertainment Weekly said the album "plays up the contrasts, [with Clark] letting her church-choir voice linger on lyrics that hint darkly at themes of violence, sex, and general chaos", and branded it "a uniquely potent cocktail of sounds and moods". Actor charted well for an independent release, peaking at No. 9 on Billboard's Independent Albums chart, No. 5 on the Tastemaker Albums chart, and No. 90 on the Billboard 200. Although it spawned no singles (except in the UK, where "Actor Out of Work" was issued as a 7" vinyl single), music videos for "Marrow" and "Actor Out of Work" were released, and aired on several music channels. A promotional music video for "Laughing with a Mouth of Blood", featuring Portlandia's Fred Armisen and Carrie Brownstein (then of ThunderAnt), was also filmed.

Two soundtracks for The Twilight Saga have featured Clark's songs. "Rosyln", in collaboration with indie folk band Bon Iver, appeared on the 2009 soundtrack of New Moon; and "The Antidote" was written for and appeared on 2012's Breaking Dawn – Part 2. In November 2010, Clark appeared with American rappers Kid Cudi and Cage on Late Night with Jimmy Fallon. They performed "Maniac" from Cudi's Man on the Moon II: The Legend of Mr. Rager, which prominently samples "The Strangers", the opening song on Actor.

=== 2011–2012: Strange Mercy and collaborations ===
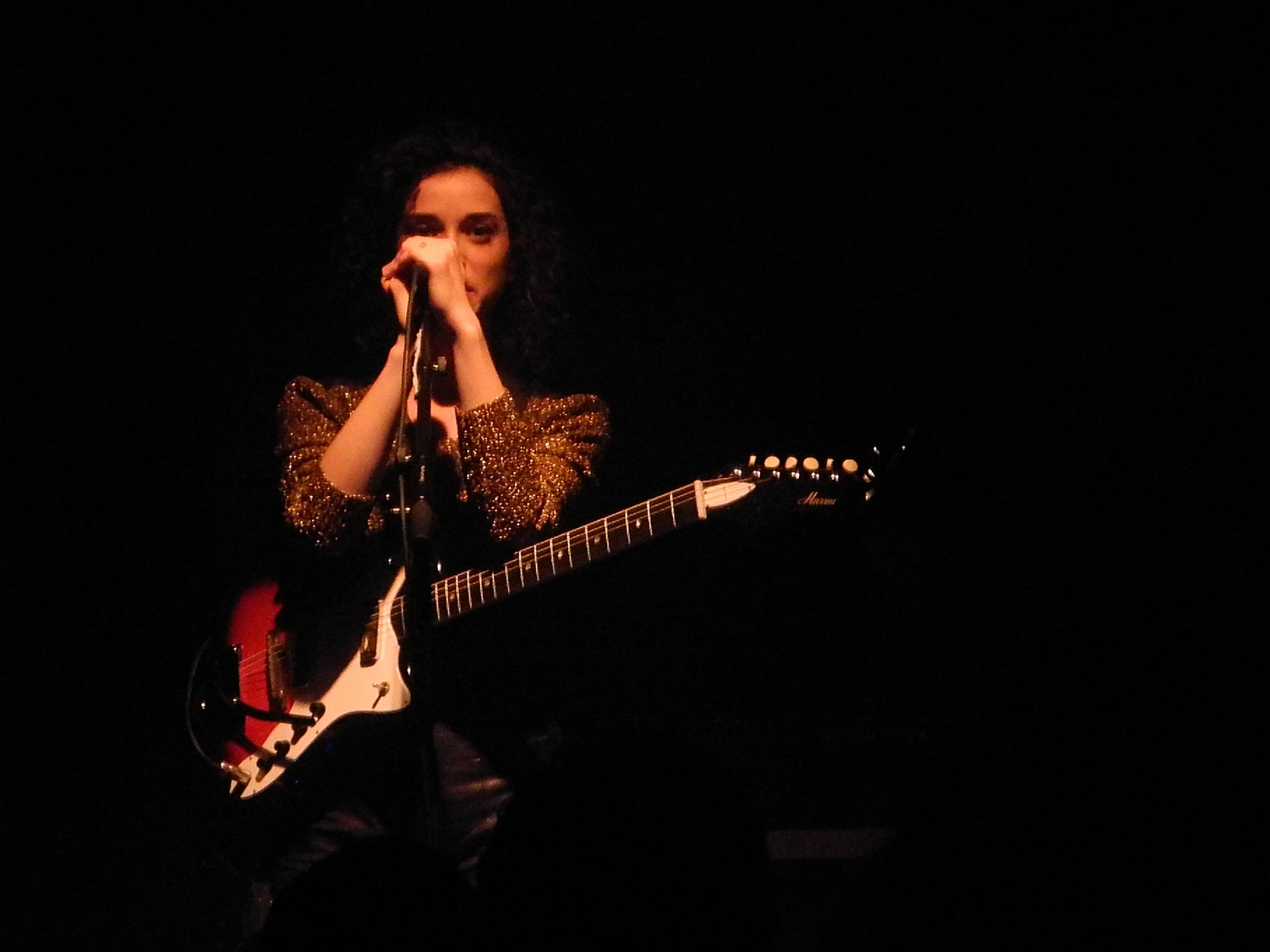
St. Vincent during the Strange Mercy Tour in 2011

Clark spent much of her time in Seattle writing her third album, Strange Mercy, in October 2010. In an interview with Julie Klausner for Spin magazine, she recalled: "[Death Cab for Cutie drummer] Jason McGerr had an office that was closing. He offered me the space for a month, for all of October. I was alone. I stayed at the Ace Hotel downtown, in one of the rooms with a shared bathroom. I would just get up in the morning and caffeinate, and run, and go to the studio for 12 hours, come back, eat dinner alone with a book, have a glass of wine, and go to bed. And do it all over again." On January 12, 2011, Clark announced via Twitter that she was working on Strange Mercy, a follow-up to Actor. In early March 2011, producer John Congleton, who also worked with Clark on Actor, said that he and Clark were nearly a third of the way through recording it.

On July 4, Clark stated via Twitter that if enough followers tweeted the hashtag "#strangemercy", she would release a track from the album. On July 22, after the threshold was met, she released "Surgeon" for download and streaming on her official website. In August 2011, Clark was interviewed and featured on the cover of Spin magazine. On August 24, 2011, a music video was released for the song "Cruel", and on September 5, the entire album was put up for streaming on NPR Music. On August 25, 2011, she debuted Strange Mercy in the Temple of Dendur room at the Metropolitan Museum of Art in New York City, introducing Toko Yasuda (ex-Enon), Matt Johnson, and Daniel Mintseris as members of her live band. The album was released September 13, 2011.

Strange Mercy received widespread acclaim from music critics. It achieved an overall rating of 8.1/10 at AnyDecentMusic? based on 36 reviews. It was St. Vincent's highest-charting album yet, peaking at No. 19 on the US Billboard 200. Clark stated, "I don't think it's the best record I'll ever make, but I think it's a good record." She began touring the US and Europe in support of the record in the fall of 2011 and continued a worldwide tour throughout 2012.

In 2011, Clark composed "Proven Badlands", an instrumental piece based on "The Sequel" from her sophomore release Actor, for ensemble Music's album Beautiful Mechanical. In 2012, Clark was featured on Andrew Bird's album Break It Yourself singing on "Lusitania". On June 14, 2012, "Who", the first single from her collaboration with David Byrne, formerly of Talking Heads, was released. The single came from their album Love This Giant, which was released September 11, 2012. On September 18, 2012, Clark participated in the "30 Songs / 30 Days" campaign to support Half the Sky: Turning Oppression into Opportunity for Women Worldwide, a multiplatform project inspired by Nicholas Kristof and Sheryl WuDunn's bestselling book. Clark also provided guest vocals for the song "What's the Use of Won'drin'" on the album Who Killed Amanda Palmer from Amanda Palmer, of the Dresden Dolls.

=== 2013–2015: St. Vincent ===
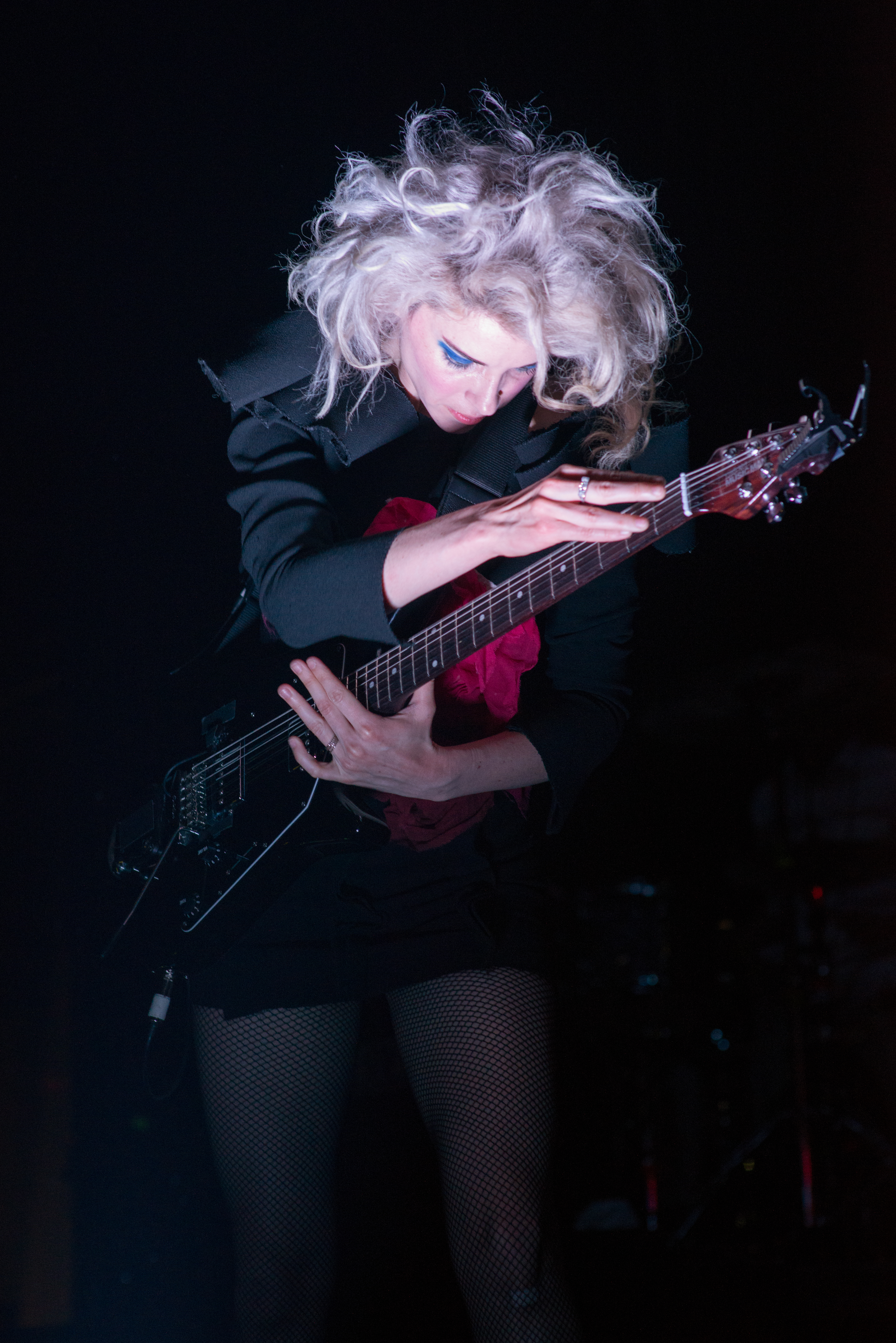
St. Vincent performing in concert during her Digital Witness Tour in 2014

On May 28, 2013, David Byrne and St. Vincent released Brass Tactics, which includes a previously unreleased Love This Giant bonus track, two remixes, and two live tracks. In November 2013, Clark received the Smithsonian American Ingenuity Award for Performing Arts and signed to Loma Vista Recordings. The new label released "Birth in Reverse" the following month, the first single from Clark's fourth album, St. Vincent, The second single, "Digital Witness", was released in January 2014, and the album was released the next month to critical acclaim. A number of publications, including The Guardian, Entertainment Weekly, NME, Gigwise, and MusicOMH, ranked it as the No. 1 album of 2014, while Time put it at No. 2 and Rolling Stone ranked it No. 4. Clark received her first Grammy, as St Vincent won "Best Alternative Music Album" in February 2015.

On April 10, 2014, Clark joined Nirvana on stage, performing lead vocals on "Lithium" at the 29th Rock and Roll Hall of Fame induction ceremony. She also provided vocals on the Swans' album To Be Kind. On August 12 and 13, 2014, Clark filled in for Fred Armisen, who was away filming the fifth season of Portlandia, as band leader for the 8G Band on Late Night with Seth Meyers. Clark toured the United States, Europe, Australia, and Asia throughout 2014, ending the year as the supporting act for the Black Keys. She extended her Digital Witness tour into the summer of 2015, and performed alongside the Pixies and Beck at Boston Calling Music Festival in May 2015.

A demo of "Teenage Talk", a track she had previously recorded but that was not included on her eponymous album, premiered on the HBO series Girls on March 10, 2015. The song was released as a single on April 6. On May 17, 2015, Clark performed with the Dallas Symphony Orchestra for the inaugural Soluna: International Music & Arts Festival.

=== 2016–2019: Masseduction ===
On April 12, 2016, it was announced that Clark would make her film directorial debut helming one of the segments of the women-directed anthology horror film XX. In June 2017, St. Vincent released "New York", the lead single from her fifth album. The Fear the Future Tour was announced in June 2017, with dates between October 2017 and February 2018. Masseduction, Clark's fifth studio album, was released in October 2017 through Loma Vista Recordings. It was met with "universal acclaim" with an average score of 88 on Metacritic. In the US, Masseduction debuted at No. 10 on the Billboard 200, becoming St. Vincent's first album to peak in the top ten of the chart, selling 29,000 units in its first week.

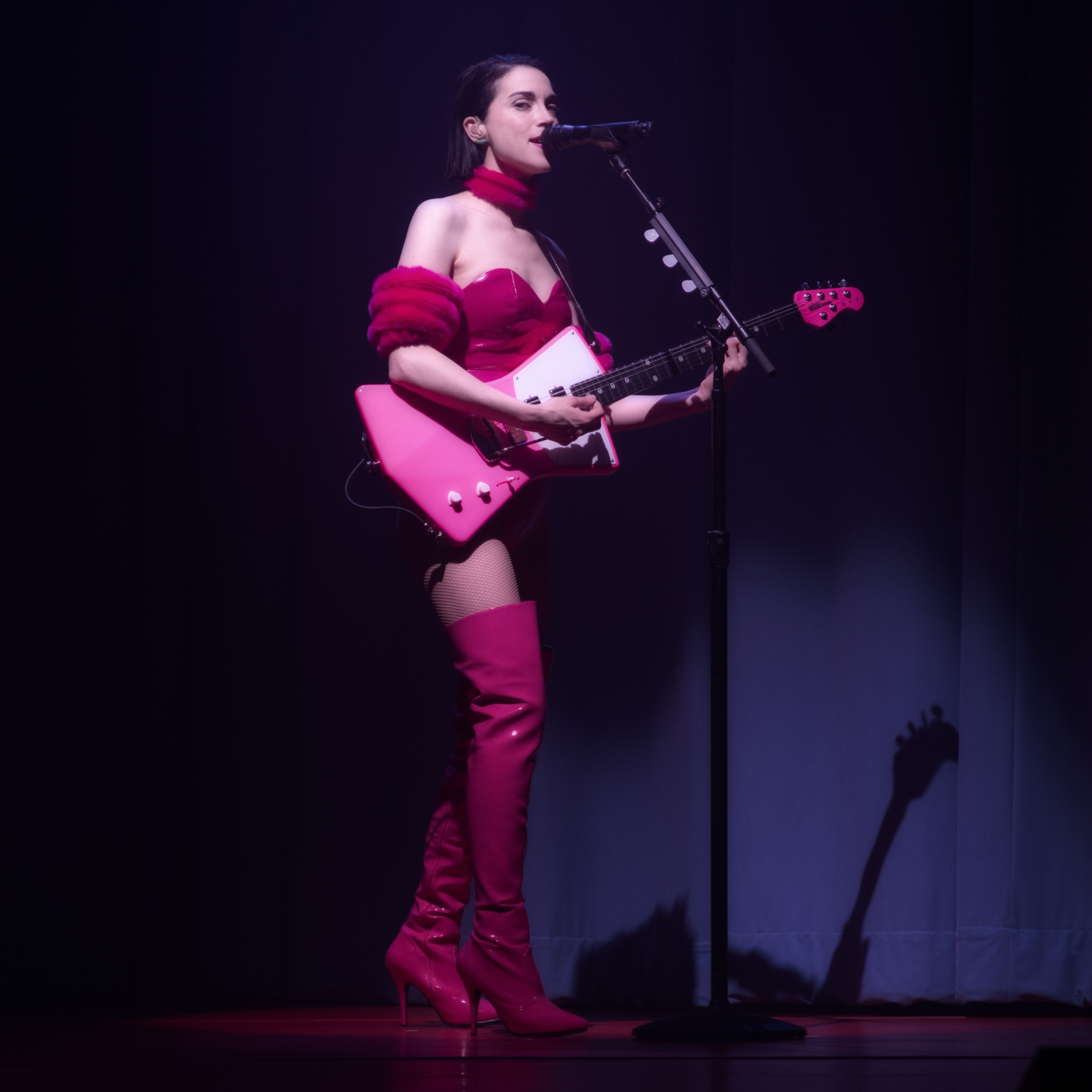
St. Vincent performing with her Ernie Ball Music Man signature guitar during her Fear the Future Tour

Clark was Record Store Day's ambassador for 2017, making her its first female ambassador. In 2018, the singer embarked on the I Am a Lot Like You! Tour, a second tour promoting the album, which took her to perform at Coachella in April. One of her performances, "Slow Disco", inspired the release of a new rendition of the track titled "Fast Slow Disco" in June. She released MassEducation, an acoustic rendition of her previous album. The album was given an 80 on Metacritic and praised by Entertainment Weekly for her versatile lyrics and strong vocals. That same year, St. Vincent collaborated with the American rock band Sleater-Kinney to produce their ninth studio album, The Center Won't Hold, which was released the following year.

In 2019, St. Vincent performed at the 61st Annual Grammy Awards, where she joined Dua Lipa for a medley of her own "Masseduction", the late Aretha Franklin's "Respect", and Lipa's Calvin Harris collaboration "One Kiss". The same night, "Masseduction" was awarded the Grammy for Best Rock Song. That summer, St. Vincent was credited as a co-writer on "Cruel Summer" with Taylor Swift and Jack Antonoff for Swift's seventh studio album Lover (2019). In December, she released Masseduction Rewired, a collection of remixes curated by Russian techno DJ Nina Kraviz.

=== 2020–2023: Daddy's Home ===
In 2020, St. Vincent was credited as a guitarist on "Texas Man" and as a co-writer on "Young Man" with the Chicks, Antonoff, and Justin Tranter for the Chicks' eighth studio album Gaslighter. In August 2020, St. Vincent collaborated with Japanese musician Yoshiki to release a classical arrangement of "New York". In October 2020, St. Vincent's online instruction class on Creativity and Songwriting was added to the MasterClass series. In late 2020, St. Vincent was featured on the track "Chalk Tablet Towers" from the first season of the Song Machine project by Gorillaz.

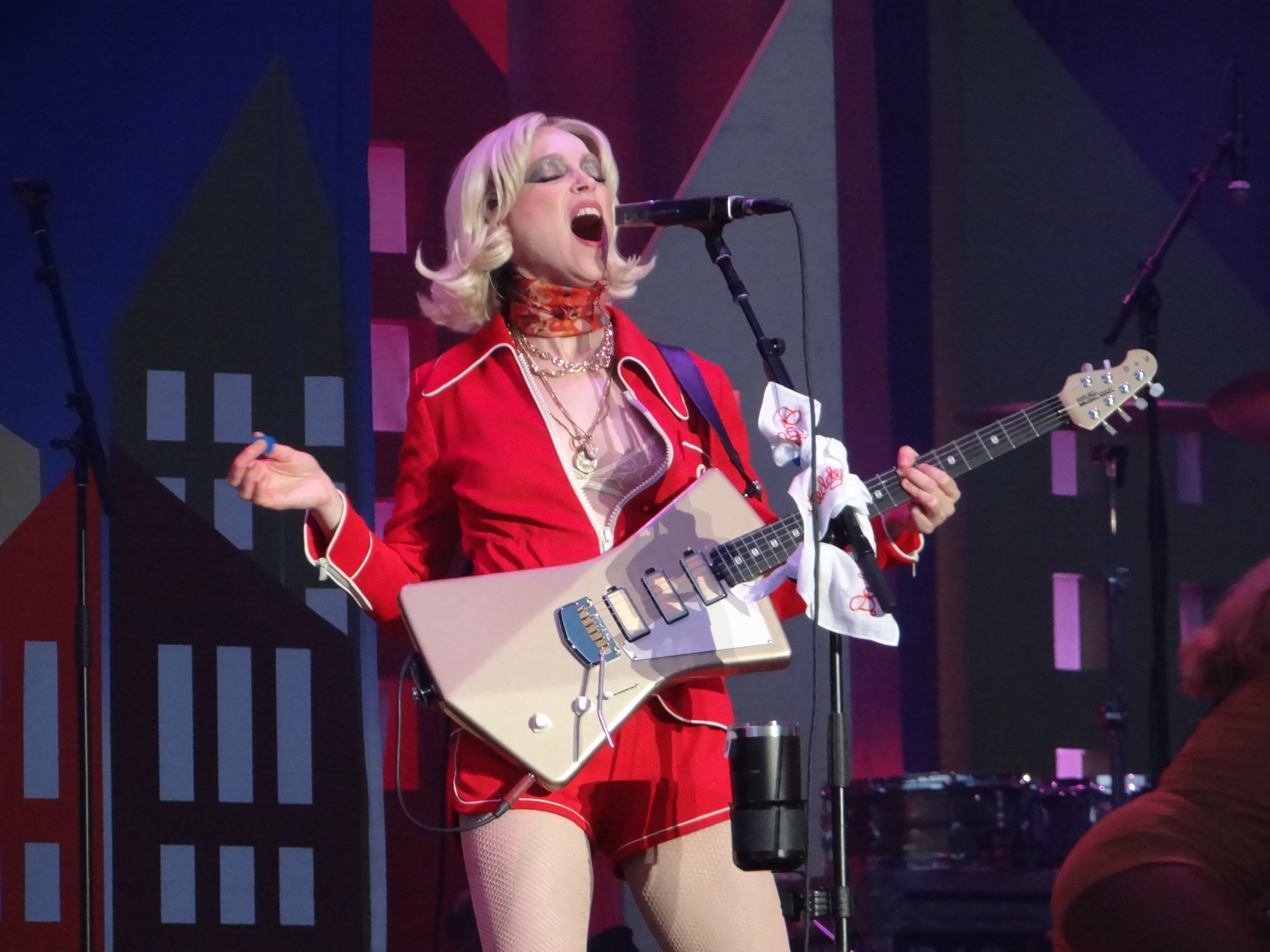
Clark during the Daddy's Home Tour at the 2021 Shaky Knees Music Festival

On December 15, 2020, St. Vincent announced she would be releasing her sixth studio album in 2021. On February 25, 2021, street posters revealed the Daddy's Home album would be released on May 14, 2021. The album's first single "Pay Your Way in Pain" was released March 4, 2021, along with a music video. The album's second single "The Melting of the Sun" was released April 1, 2021, alongside a lyric video. Two days later St. Vincent was the musical guest on Saturday Night Live, performing both "Pay Your Way in Pain" and "The Melting of the Sun".

St. Vincent starred in the 2020 psychological thriller film The Nowhere Inn, featuring a script written by her and Carrie Brownstein, about a fictional attempt to make a documentary on St. Vincent's musical career. Additionally, she wrote the film's soundtrack, releasing on digital streaming services on September 17, 2021, and later on limited vinyl on April 23, 2022, as part of Record Store Day. She contributed a cover of the Metallica song "Sad but True" to the charity tribute album The Metallica Blacklist, released in September 2021.

On April 3, 2022, Daddy's Home won the award for Best Alternative Music Album at the 64th Annual Grammy Awards. On June 3, 2022, St. Vincent released her cover of Lipps Inc.'s "Funkytown" appearing on the soundtrack for Illumination's film Minions: The Rise of Gru. On February 13, 2023, St. Vincent joined Yoshiki on stage at Royal Albert Hall to perform an orchestral version of "New York". In September 2023, St. Vincent performed in the music documentary film Yoshiki: Under the Sky.

=== 2024–present: All Born Screaming and Live with Orchestra ===
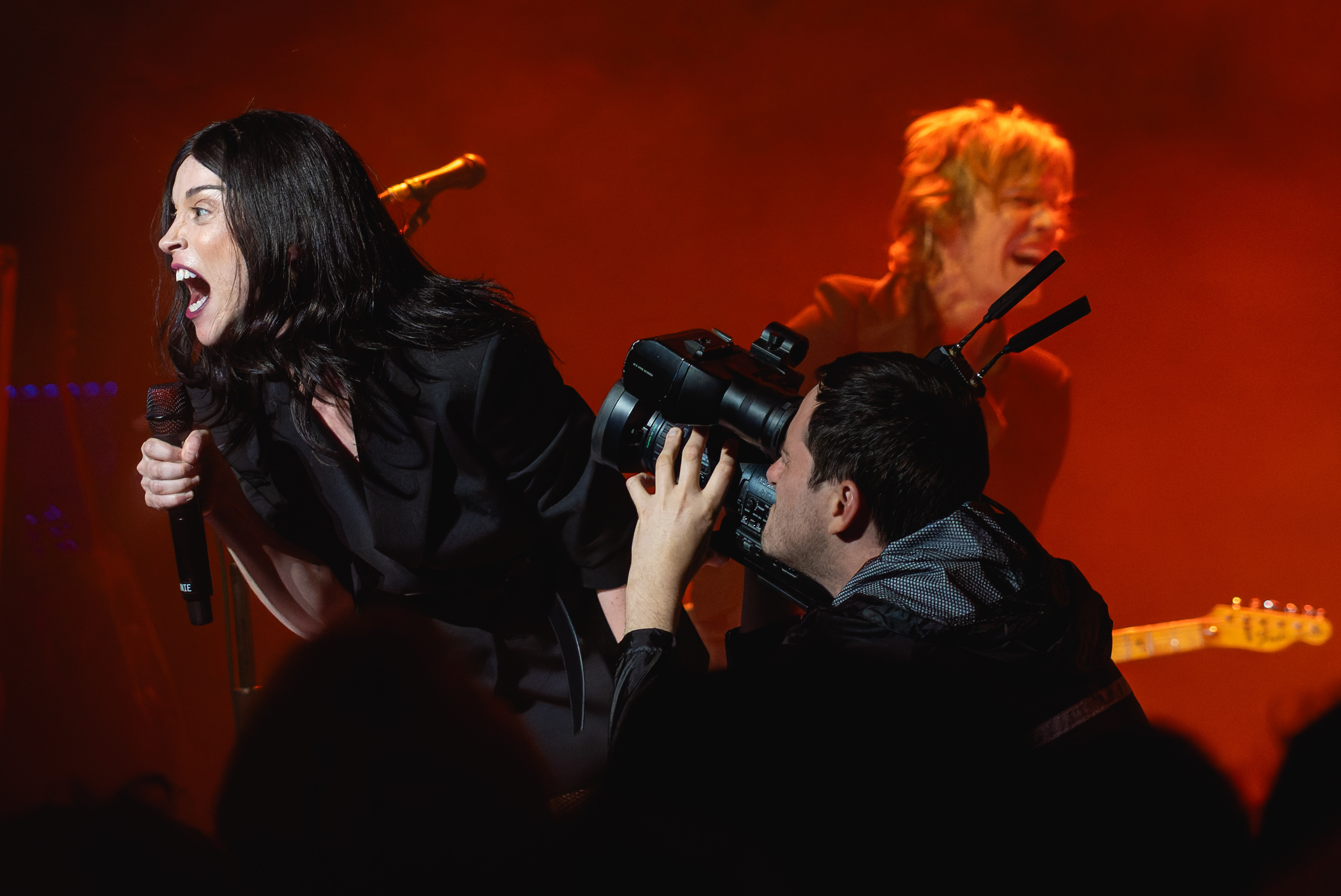
St. Vincent in 2024 during her All Born Screaming Tour

On February 29, 2024, St. Vincent released "Broken Man", the lead single from her seventh studio album All Born Screaming which was released on April 26, 2024. A second single, "Flea", was released on March 28, same day the All Born Screaming Tour was officially announced. Upon release, the album received critical acclaim, aggregating a weighted average score of 89 on Metacritic.

A profile in The New York Times after the album's release noted: "Seven albums and 17 years into an acclaimed solo career, Clark has eked out a singular space in music, occasionally intersecting with the mainstream but for the most part staying uncompromisingly countercultural", labeling tracks from the new release "some of the heaviest, darkest and weirdest St. Vincent music to date. 'That’s what I want from music right now, personally,' Clark said, safe in the shade of the California sun. 'I would like a pummeling. I want something to feel dangerous'".

On November 15, 2024, St. Vincent released a Spanish-language version of All Born Screaming entitled Todos Nacen Gritando. In an interview prior to Todos Nacen Gritando's release, Clark said that translating and recording the album was "a beautiful exercise and an attempt to offer a little thanks to Spanish-language fans who have met me in my native tongue for seven records".

On February 2, 2025, St. Vincent attended the 67th Annual Grammy Awards where she won in three separate categories for Best Rock Song, Best Alternative Music Performance, and Best Alternative Music Album. The latter category marked her third win in the category, extending her record there as the female soloist with the most wins.

On September 3, 2025, St. Vincent performed on the BBC Proms alongside Jules Buckley and his orchestra, marking the final date of her All Born Screaming Tour, at the Royal Albert Hall. Inspired by the experience, in 2026 the artist announced Live with Orchestra, a concert series where she's joined by Buckley and his orchestra on several North American cities.. The Royal Albert Hall concert was released as Live in London!, her first live album, on digital platforms on March 20, followed by a physical vinyl release on July 10.

She collaborated with Argentinian artist Dillom in two songs for his album La nueva violencia.

== Musical style and influences ==
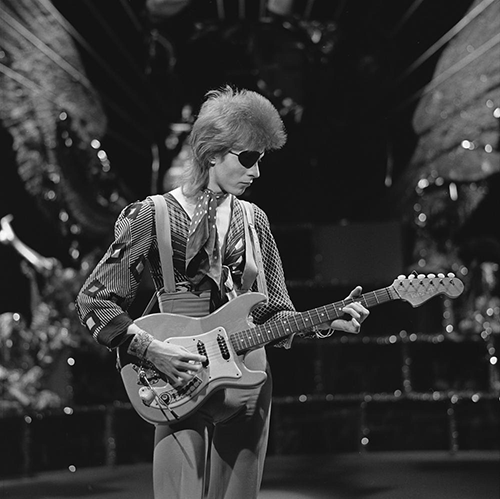
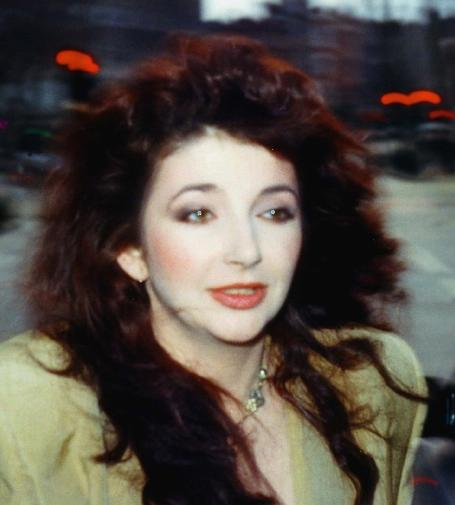
David Bowie and Kate Bush have influenced Clark.

Clark’s music, which features her mezzo-soprano voice, has been noted for its wide array of instruments and complex arrangements, as well as its polysemous lyrics, which have been described as teetering between "happiness and madness". In response, Clark has said, "I like when things come out of nowhere and blindside you a little bit. I think any person who gets panic attacks or has an anxiety disorder can understand how things can all of a sudden turn very quickly. I think I'm sublimating that into the music." In addition to guitar, Clark also plays bass, piano, organ, and theremin. Her music also often features violins, cellos, flutes, trumpets, clarinets, and other instruments. Her musical style has been characterised as rock, pop, art rock and indie rock, incorporating a wide range of influences including experimental rock, chamber pop, electropop, soft rock, and cabaret jazz.

Clark mentioned that singers such as David Bowie and Kate Bush had inspired her, as had Jimi Hendrix and Siouxsie and the Banshees. She said in a 2015 lecture she listens to a Bowie track every day, and that "It's No Game (Part One)" was her favorite. Talking Heads, Metallica, Nine Inch Nails, Patti Smith and Pink Floyd are also influences, as well as guitarists Robert Fripp and Adrian Belew (both from King Crimson), Marc Ribot and Tool. Clark cited the author Lorrie Moore as an inspiration for St Vincent.

== Equipment ==
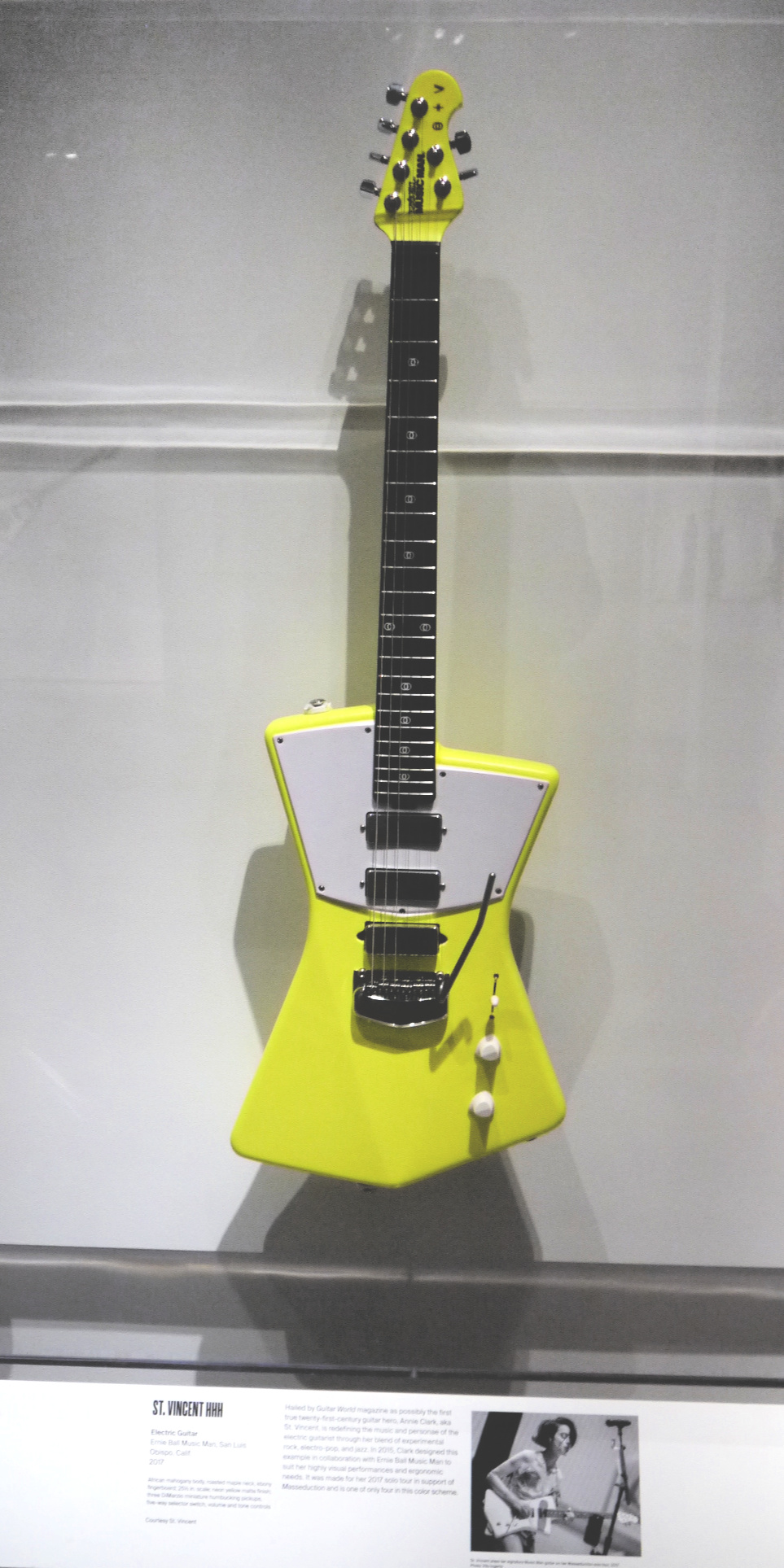
Clark's signature Ernie Ball Music Man St. Vincent HHH guitar

Clark has played a 1967 Harmony Bobkat, 1960's Silvertone 1488, 1979 Hagström Super Swede, Fender Deluxe Nashville Telecaster, and a Ernie Ball Music Man Albert Lee HH. In recent years, she has primarily played her signature Ernie Ball Music Man St. Vincent guitar.

=== Signature guitar ===
In March 2016, Ernie Ball announced that Clark had designed a signature Music Man guitar. Unique to the guitar was the design, which Welsh singer Cate Le Bon claimed in The Guardian as being made for women's bodies and providing pleasing aesthetic form in support of the guitar's function. However, Clark has since stated that the guitar being specifically for women was not a consideration during the design process.

It was originally released in 2016 as the St. Vincent HHH with three mini-humbuckers in a signature Vincent Blue finish, a paint color which Clark herself had personally hand-mixed and selected, as well as in Black.

In 2017, four additional colors were added to the guitar line, Polaris White, Heritage Red, Tobacco Burst, and Stealth Black. 2017 was also the last year to feature a solid rosewood neck and fingerboard, due to heavy rosewood trade restrictions under CITES, later models would primarily use a roasted maple neck with ebony fingerboard. A St. Vincent HH signature model was released in 2018 featuring two humbuckers in place of the three mini-humbuckers on the original.

In 2021, a new St. Vincent Goldie signature model was released, featuring three gold foil mini-humbucker pickups, a reverse matching finish headstock, redesigned pickguard shape in 3-ply parchment, a roasted maple neck, and stainless steel frets.

Notable users of the guitar include Jack White, who used the three pickup version during every performance of his Boarding House Reach tour in 2018, Todd Tamanend Clark, Tom Morello, J Mascis, Les Priest of LANY, Eva Hendricks of Charly Bliss, Emily Roberts of The Last Dinner Party, and Dan Boeckner of Wolf Parade.

== Personal life ==
Clark divides her time between Los Angeles, Dallas, and New York City. A 2014 Village Voice profile describes her as a private person. David Byrne, with whom she collaborated and toured, said of her: "Despite having toured with her for almost a year, I don't think I know her much better, at least not on a personal level... Mystery is not a bad thing for a beautiful, talented young woman (or man) to embrace. And she does it without seeming to be standoffish or distant."

When asked during a 2014 interview with Rolling Stone whether she identified as gay or straight, Clark responded: "I don't think about those words. I believe in gender fluidity and sexual fluidity. I don't really identify as anything. I think you can fall in love with anybody. I don't have anything to hide but I'd rather the emphasis be on music." Later that year, in an interview with the UK's Sunday Times, she elaborated: "I'm not one for gender or sexual absolutism in the main; I fully support and engage in the spectrum." In 2024, she stated that she identifies as queer. In the same year, during an interview with Vera Siemons, Clark referred to herself as a lesbian. Clark was in a relationship with the actress and fashion model Cara Delevingne from late 2014 until mid-2016. Clark briefly dated actress Kristen Stewart in late 2016. In a 2020 article, the Los Angeles Times noted that she and Sleater-Kinney's Carrie Brownstein "dated years ago". While accepting a Grammy Award in 2025, she revealed she has a wife named Leah as well as a daughter.

In May 2010, Clark's father was convicted of one count of conspiracy, seven counts of wire fraud, five counts of securities fraud, and one count of money laundering. The album Daddy's Home was in part inspired by her father's eventual release.

== Discography ==
Studio albums

- Marry Me (2007)
- Actor (2009)
- Strange Mercy (2011)
- St. Vincent (2014)
- Masseduction (2017)
- Daddy's Home (2021)
- All Born Screaming (2024)

Collaborative albums

- Love This Giant (with David Byrne) (2012)

== Tours ==
- Marry Me Tour (2007–08)
- Actor Tour (2009–10)
- Strange Mercy Tour (2011–12)
- Love This Giant Tour (with David Byrne) (2012–13)
- Digital Witness Tour (2014–15)
- Fear the Future Tour (2017–18)
- I Am a Lot Like You! Tour (2018–19)
- Daddy's Home Tour (2021–23)
- All Born Screaming Tour (2024–25)
- Live with Orchestra (2026)

== Awards and nominations ==
Year	Award	Category	Nominated work	Result	Ref.
2009	Rober Awards Music Prize	Best Female Artist	Herself	Nominated	
2009	Rober Awards Music Prize	Best Songwriter	Herself	Nominated	
2011	Rober Award Music Prize	Best Pop Artist	Herself	Nominated	
2011	Rober Award Music Prize	Best Female Artist	Herself	Nominated	
2011	Rober Award Music Prize	Best Promo Video	"Cruel"	Nominated	
2012	Rober Awards Music Prize	Best Promo Video	"Who"	Nominated	
2012	UK Music Video Awards	Best Alternative Video – International	"Cheerleader"	Nominated	
2013	AIM Independent Music Awards	Independent Album of the Year	Love This Giant	Nominated	
2013	AIM Independent Music Awards	Independent Video of the Year	Love This Giant	Nominated	
2013	Webby Awards	Best Editing	In Practice	Won	
2014	Rober Awards Music Prize	Best Female Artist	Herself	Won	
2014	Rober Awards Music Prize	Best Songwriter	Herself	Won	
2014	Rober Awards Music Prize	Album of the Year	St. Vincent	Won	
2014	Rober Awards Music Prize	Best Promo Video	"Digital Witness"	Won	
2014	UK Music Video Awards	Best Alternative Video – International	"Digital Witness"	Nominated	
2014	UK Music Video Awards	Best Art Direction & Design in a Video	"Digital Witness"	Nominated	
2014	UK Music Video Awards	Best Styling in a Video	"Digital Witness"	Nominated	
2014	Q Awards	Best Solo Artist	Herself	Nominated	
2014	Q Awards	Maverick Award	Herself	Won	
2015	Grammy Awards	Best Alternative Music Album	St. Vincent	Won	
2015	NME Awards	Best Album	St. Vincent	Nominated	
2015	NME Awards	Best Solo Artist	Herself	Nominated	
2016	A2IM Libera Awards	Best Live Act	Herself	Nominated	
2017	Rober Awards Music Prize	Best Female Artist	Herself	Won	
2017	Rober Awards Music Prize	Best Promo Video	"Los Ageless"	Won	
2017	AMFT Awards	Best Alternative Album	Masseduction	Won	
2017	Q Awards	Best Solo Artist	Herself	Nominated	
2018	Q Awards	Best Act in the World Today	Herself	Nominated	
2018	Queerty Awards	Musician	Herself	Nominated	
2018	NME Awards	Best International Solo Artist	Herself	Nominated	
2018	NME Awards	Best Video	"Los Ageless"	Nominated	
2018	Webby Awards	Best Music Video	"Los Ageless"	Won	
2018	Webby Awards	Best Art Direction	"Los Ageless"	Won	
2018	AMFT Awards	Best Rock Song	"Masseduction"	Won	
2018	GLAAD Media Award	Outstanding Music Artist	Masseduction	Nominated	
2019	Grammy Awards	Best Alternative Music Album	Masseduction	Nominated	
2019	Grammy Awards	Best Rock Song	"Masseduction"	Won	
2022	Grammy Awards	Best Alternative Music Album	Daddy's Home	Won	
2022	GLAAD Media Award	Outstanding Music Artist	Daddy's Home	Nominated	
2022	Denmark GAFFA Awards	International Album	Daddy's Home	Nominated	
2022	Denmark GAFFA Awards	International Solo Act	Herself	Nominated	
2022	Libera Award	Libera Award for Best Live/Livestream Act	At the Holiday Party at Austin City Limits Music Festival	Nominated	
2025	Grammy Awards	Best Rock Performance	"Broken Man"	Nominated	
2025	Grammy Awards	Best Rock Song	"Broken Man"	Won	
2025	Grammy Awards	Best Alternative Music Performance	"Flea"	Won	
2025	Grammy Awards	Best Alternative Music Album	All Born Screaming	Won	

== See also ==
- LGBTQ culture in New York City
- List of LGBT people from New York City
- List of guitarists
