= Denise S. Young =

American tech executive and musical artist (born 1955)

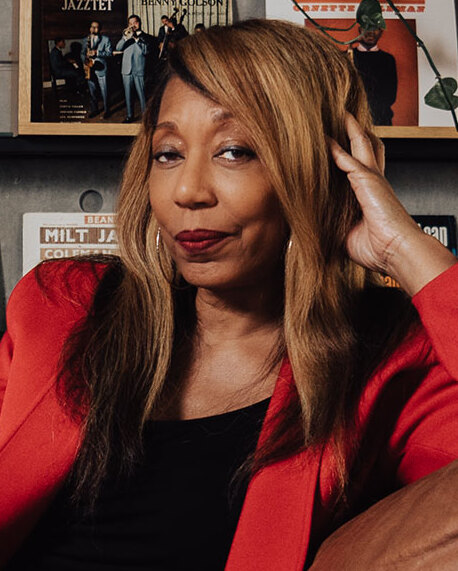
- Young in 2020
- Born: June 30, 1955 (age 71)
- Education: Grambling State University
- Occupations: Artist, author, and advisor
- Website: www.deniseyoungsoprano.com

Denise S. Young (born June 30, 1955) is an American former tech executive and musical artist.

== Education ==
Young holds a bachelor's in journalism and communications and a master's in organizational management from Grambling State University in Louisiana.

== Career ==
=== Technology field ===
Young spent over two decades in the tech industry, including a senior leadership role at Apple Inc. as Senior Director of Human Resources in 1997. She was made the company's first VP of Diversity and Inclusion in 2017. In May 2017, while speaking at a submit in Bogotá, Young said "there can be 12 white blue-eyed blonde men in a room and they are going to be diverse too because they’re going to bring a different life experience and life perspective to the conversation". The comment drew controversy, and she apologized afterwards. She left Apple in November of that year.

=== Music and writing ===
In 2017, Young released her debut single, "Come Sunday," a reinterpretation of Duke Ellington's jazz hymn.

She later collaborated with jazz vocalist Patti Andress on her first album, Denise Young, Soprano.

In May 2019, Young appeared in recital at Subculture, and performed works from her 2018 album.

In September 2020, Young was appointed by SFJAZZ as its board chair.

She is the founder of Blue Organza Productions, LLC, under which her album was produced, and also a recording studio she uses personally and for mentoring.

Young is the author of When We Are Seen.

== Discography ==
- "Come Sunday" (2017, single)
- Denise Young, Soprano (album, co-produced by Patti Andress)
