= Los Ageless =

- DJDS Version single artwork

Single by St. Vincent

from the album Masseduction
- Released: September 6, 2017
- Genre: Dance-rock; industrial; new wave; electropop
- Length: 4:41
- Label: Loma Vista
- Songwriter: Annie Clark
- Producers: Jack Antonoff; St. Vincent

St. Vincent singles chronology
| "New York" (2017) | "Los Ageless" (2017) | "Pills" (2017) |

Music video
- "Los Ageless" on YouTube

"Los Ageless" is a song by the American musician St. Vincent. It was released on September 6, 2017, through Loma Vista as the second single from her fifth studio album, Masseduction.

== Composition ==
"Los Ageless" is a dance-rock, new wave, and electropop song driven by, "the flat thwack of electronic drums and a squirting synth-bass sound" while Clark "slathers distorted guitar lines on top of this foundation." Stereogum's Tom Breihan described the song is nothing like Clark has ever done before, further stating, "the title might make the song seem like a companion piece, but it's actually a pulsing, synthetic, slightly funky piece of new wave." Andrew Trendell of NME stated that, "'Los Ageless' [is] fuelled by a rush of industrial electro beats and fuzzy guitar," while seeing Clark "further blurring the boundaries of genre as the stomp of the track builds towards an almighty and feral climax."

== Accolades ==
| Publication | Country | Accolade | Year | Rank |
|---|---|---|---|---|
| Billboard | United States | The 25 Best Rock Songs of 2017: Critics' Picks | 2017 | 5 |

== Music video ==
An accompanying music video for "Los Ageless" was released on October 3, 2017. The video was directed by Willo Perron. In the video, Clark "parodies the lives of Los Angeles socialites (yoga classes, plastic surgery, etc.) in a gruesome, pastel fashion."

== Personnel ==
Credits adapted from Masseduction booklet.

Musicians

- Annie Clark – guitar, vocals
- Tuck Andress – guitar
- Patti Andress – vocals
- Greg Leisz – pedal steel
- Jack Antonoff – synths, programming
- Evan Smith – saxophone

Technical

- Laura Sisk – engineering
- Jack Antonoff – additional engineering
- Annie Clark – additional engineering
- Sean Cook – additional engineering
- Tom Elmhirst – mixing
- Brandon Boost – mix engineering
- Chris Gehringer – mastering

== Charts ==
| Chart (2017–18) | Peak position |
|---|---|
| Scotland Singles (OCC) | 96 |
| US Adult Alternative Airplay (Billboard) | 6 |
| US Alternative Airplay (Billboard) | 23 |

== Release history ==
| Region | Date | Format(s) | Label | Ref. |
|---|---|---|---|---|
| United States | November 21, 2017 | Alternative radio | Loma Vista | |

== Alternate version ==
An acoustic version (featuring only Clark's vocals and acoustic piano) was released in October 2018 on MassEducation, an "acoustic reworking" of the entire Masseduction album.

== Other media ==
The song was featured in the fifth season premiere of the Netflix animated show BoJack Horseman, miniseries Echoes (2022) and Obsession (2023), as well as the films Miss Bala (2019) and Am I OK? (2022). English rock band the Wombats covered the song in 2018.
