= Terrence Dixon =

American techno producer

- Also known as: Population One
- Born: Terrence Dixon
- Genres: Detroit techno, minimal techno
- Occupation: Producer
- Years active: 1994 - present
- Labels: Metroplex, Tresor, Reduction, Utensil, Background, Rush Hour

Terrence Dixon, also known under the alias Population One, is an American techno producer and DJ based in Detroit, Michigan. He is known for his minimal techno sound. He has released on numerous record labels including Tresor and Metroplex. In 2014, Dixon announced his retirement from making music, but currently continues to release music.

Dixon maintains a low profile and is "not into interviews." He stated that his music comes from his surroundings and his own personal life, and also cited Teddy Pendergrass, The O'Jays, Mantronix and Jimi Hendrix as some of his biggest musical influences. Dixon makes use of a Roland MC-303 groovebox.

== Musical career ==
Dixon started producing acid in the early ‘90s. He debuted in 1994 and subsequently released several records on Utensil Records, a label ran by Claude Young. He released two Population One records on Metroplex in the second half of the 90s. Dixon was also involved in the production of Juan Atkins’ Skynet album.

In 2000, he released his debut album From The Far Future on Tresor. Dixon explains: “'From The Far Future' is all about respecting those who came before me, respecting the art of pure Techno, taking bits and pieces of what's old and making it new once again.” The album was reissued in 2016 with two previously unreleased tracks.

Since 2007, Dixon has put out a large number of music on various record labels, including re-releases of older tracks and numerous compilation appearances. He also released several albums, such as the sequel to From The Far Future and Theater Of A Confused Mind as Population One. He launched his own Reduction label in 2013.
