= Paradise Found (album) =

Studio album by Tuck & Patti
- Released: September 29, 1998
- Genre: Jazz
- Length: 57:35
- Label: Windham Hill
- Producer: Patti Cathcart

Tuck & Patti chronology
Learning How to Fly (1995)	Paradise Found (1998)	Taking the Long Way Home (2000)

Professional ratings
Review scores
Source	Rating
AllMusic	4/5 stars

Paradise Found is the fifth album by Tuck & Patti, released September 29, 1998.

== Critical reception ==
Patricia Myers of JazzTimes writes, "In a departure from past albums, Tuck's guitar expertise and Patti’s ethereal vocals are supplemented by other musicians. Saxophonist Mark Miller and percussionist David Frazier are added to the Brazilian-flavored 'Lembrancas', and a doo-wop vocal group called The Blenders enriches Patti's pop-soul deliveries of 'All This Love' and 'Dance With Me'. Norton Buffalo plays harmonica on a funky 'You'."

Geoffrey Himes of The Washington Post wrote: "Because Andress and Cathcart are much better interpretive musicians than songwriters, this collection of cover tunes is the best vehicle they've ever had. All the songs receive nicely understated arrangements, which guard against the temptation toward gushy sentimentality. Instead, the spare settings allow Cathcart's agile alto and Andress's fleet-fingered picking to achieve that cream-skimming blend of jazz and pop influences that so many smooth-jazz artists aim for and so few reach."

Dave Hughes of All About Jazz wrote: "Tuck and Patti, guitar and vocal duo as well as husband and wife, offer up another helping of positive, optimistic musical brilliance on Paradise Found. I think they found paradise about twenty years ago, when they first began performing together. They both possess considerable chops, always utilized in exquisite taste and in perfect tandem."

== Track listing ==
No.	Title	Writer(s)	Length
1.	"Lembranças"	Rory Stuart; Patricia Cathcart Andress	4:32
2.	"Adventures in Paradise"	Minnie Riperton; Joe Sample; Richard Rudolph	3:42
3.	"Captain for Dark Mornings"	Laura Nyro	4:21
4.	"When We're Alone"	Clifford Brown; Michael Stillman	3:53
5.	"All This Love"	Eldra DeBarge	5:22
6.	"I've Grown Accustomed to Her Face"	Alan Jay Lerner; Frederick Loewe	3:05
7.	"Holiday… Paradise Found"	Patricia Cathcart Andress	4:12
8.	"I Will"	John Lennon; Paul McCartney	2:52
9.	"Dance With Me"	Jerry Leiber; Mike Stoller; George Treadwell; Lewis Lebish; Irving Nahan	4:37
10.	"You"	Alfred McCrary; Sam McCrary; Linda McCrary	4:15
11.	"Walkin' One And Only"	Dan Hicks	2:35
12.	"Forgiveness"	Patricia Cathcart Andress	4:35
13.	"Let's Stay Together"	Al Green; Willie Mitchell; Al Jackson, Jr.	4:35
14.	"All This Love (Remix)"	Eldra DeBarge	4:59
Total length:			57:35

== Musicians ==
- Patti Cathcart – Vocals
- Tuck Andress – Electric Guitar
- Michael Bland – Drums (Tracks 5, 9, 14)
- The Blenders – (Timothy Kasper, Ryan Myrold, Allan Rust, Darren Rust) – Background Vocals (Tracks 5, 9, 14)
- Norton Buffalo – Harmonica (Track 10)
- David Frazier – Percussion (Track 1)
- Mark Miller – Soprano Sax (Track 1)
- Paul Peterson – Electric Bass (Track 5, 14), Upright Bass (Track 9)
- Ricky Peterson – Keyboards (Track 5, 9, 14)

== Production ==
- Producer – Patti Cathcart
- Arranger – Patti Cathcart
- Engineered by Tuck Andress
- Assisted by Adlai Alexander
- Percussion recorded at Different Fur Recording, San Francisco, CA
- Engineered by Howard Johnson
- Assisted by Mark Slagle
- Mixed by Howard Johnson at Different Fur Recording
- Additional engineering by Mark Slagle
- Assisted by Justin Lieberman
- "All This Love" and "Dance With Me"
  - Produced and Arranged by Ricky Peterson
  - Recorded and Mixed by Tom Tucker at Seedy Underbelly, Minneapolis, MN
  - Assistant Engineer – Shane Washington
  - Additional Recording at OarFin Studios, Minneapolis, MN
  - Assistant Engineers – Todd Fitzgerals and Brian Johnson
  - Production Assistant – Larry Osterman
- "All This Love" (Remix)
  - Remixed by Westside Chemical (Jamie LeMoine, Tom Moloney, William Kehoe)
  - Assisted by Tuck & Patti
  - Mixed and Engineered by Howard Johnson at Different Fur Recording, San Francisco, CA
  - Assisted by Justin Lieberman
  - Original Production – Ricky Peterson
  - Assembled and Mastered by Howard Johnson at Different Fur Recording

Track information and credits verified from the album's liner notes.
