= New York (St. Vincent song) =

Single by St. Vincent

from the album Masseduction
- Released: June 30, 2017
- Genre: Pop
- Length: 2:33
- Label: Loma Vista
- Songwriter(s): Annie Clark; Jack Antonoff
- Producer(s): Jack Antonoff; St. Vincent

St. Vincent singles chronology
"Under Neon Lights" (2015)	"New York" (2017)	"Los Ageless" (2017)

Music video
- "New York" on YouTube

"New York" is a song by the American musician, St. Vincent. "New York" was released on June 30, 2017, through Loma Vista as the lead single off of her fifth studio album, Masseduction.

== Background ==
In May 2017, The New York Times wrote that the American producer Jack Antonoff is working on new music with Annie Clark (i.e., St. Vincent). Clark performed the song for the first time in June 2016 during a New York City benefit show.

== Composition ==
"New York" is a sombre ballad mourning the end of a relationship. Unlike Clark's previous material, "New York" does not contain "fiery guitar playing, nor the squelching industrial soundscapes of her great self-titled album from 2014. It's just her voice, and some simple lilting piano chords—that's about it." The song finds Clark "singing without apparent irony about personal loss. The song could also be read as a eulogy for a certain portion of the soul of New York City itself; she sings mostly about locales in the East Village, painting them with a wild romantic streak that exists mostly in the memory of the city's denizens." Andy Cush of Spin described "New York" as, "far more straightforward than we've come to expect from Annie Clark," while also comparing the song to Lorde's "Liability".

== Critical reception ==
"New York" featured as Pitchfork's "Best New Track", with Laura Snapes deeming it "a jarring sentiment from someone who always seems so supremely herself." Spin's Andy Cush explained, "it would be real shame for a talent as wild and idiosyncratic as Clark's to lose its edges in the pop production and songwriting wringer. "New York" is surprisingly benign compared to her recent output, except for one moment, when she spits out a "motherfucker" worthy of Nick Cave in an otherwise lovely chorus. It's enough to reassure you that St. Vincent still has some acid in her." Pitchfork included the song at number 169 on its "Best Songs of the 2010s" list.

== Music video ==
The music video for "New York" was directed by the visual artist, Alex Da Corte, and it was released on August 31, 2017. The music video features Clark performing the song with "a loud variety of fashion choices" in front of "increasingly lurid and colorful backdrops.". In 2018, St. Vincent and Da Corte reunited for another video, as part of Da Corte's exhibition, C-A-T Spells Murder at the Karma Gallery in New York City (February 18 – March 18, 2018). The exhibition featured an 11-minute video of St. Vincent holding a one-eyed feline while the performer makes a series of facial expressions ending in terror. The film played on a loop, and was part of an installation which also featured an eleven foot high sculpture of a cat.

== Official versions ==
1. Album/Single Version/Radio Edit - 2:34
2. Kelly Lee Owens Remix - 4:41
3. DJDS Version - 3:05
4. Live at Austin City Limits single version - 2:45
5. YOSHIKI version - 2:54
6. Nina Kraviz Vocal Mix - 5:14
7. Nina Kraviz x Lucy Dubbed Out Mix - 5:23
8. Nina Kraviz Dirty Master Mix - 5:14
9. "Words + Music" Audible version - 2:46

== Personnel ==
Credits adapted from Masseduction booklet.

Musicians

- Annie Clark – vocals
- Thomas Bartlett – piano
- Jack Antonoff – synths, programming
- Philip A. Peterson – cello
- Timothy Garland – violin

Technical

- Laura Sisk – engineering
- Jack Antonoff – additional engineering
- Annie Clark – additional engineering
- Sean Cook – additional engineering
- Tom Elmhirst – mixing
- Brandon Boost – mix engineering
- Chris Gehringer – mastering

== Charts ==
Chart (2017)	Peak position
Belgium (Ultratip Bubbling Under Flanders)	32
US Adult Alternative Songs (Billboard)	22
