= Digital Witness =

- Digital release cover

Single by St. Vincent

from the album St. Vincent
- B-side: "Del Rio" (7"); "Birth in Reverse" (Triangular 7")
- Released: January 6, 2014
- Recorded: 2014
- Genre: Funk; disco; art pop; R&B
- Length: 3:22
- Label: Loma Vista; Republic
- Songwriter: Annie Clark
- Producer: John Congleton

St. Vincent singles chronology
"Birth in Reverse" (2013)	"Digital Witness" (2014)	"Prince Johnny" (2014)

Alternate cover
- Vinyl single

Music video
- "Digital Witness" on YouTube

"Digital Witness" is the second single from St. Vincent, the eponymous fourth album by American musician St. Vincent. It was released with another single, "Birth in Reverse", on a gold vinyl triangle packaged with the album. The song, whose lyrics deal with dependence on social media, and its music video have both received positive attention from critics. Darkside produced a remix soon after the song's release.

== Release ==
"Digital Witness" was released as an advance single from St. Vincent on 6 January 2014. The music video premiered on 31 January 2014. Prior to its release, the single was available to pre-order on a die-cut vinyl triangle with "Birth in Reverse" as its B-side. The record was a limited edition of 1,000 copies, packaged with CD and LP copies of St. Vincent.

== Composition ==
Annie Clark has said that the song "encapsulates this idea where we've become very dependent on other people [...] a million digital eyes, validating our experience". The lyrics are a clear commentary on social media, including Clark's own experience on websites such as Twitter, which self-deprecatingly she describes as "pathetic". In an existential sense, the lyrics question how people evaluate what is and is not important in the digital age.

Writing for Pitchfork, Katherine St. Asaph compared "Digital Witness" to "I Should Watch TV", a track from Love This Giant, Clark's 2013 collaboration with David Byrne; she concluded that Clark likely took a cue from Byrne in composing "Digital Witness". St. Asaph noted similarities between the funky rhythms and brass instruments in both tracks, as well as their shared lyrical themes. She calls "Digital Witness" "celebratory as it's cautionary", like "I Should Watch TV", which she describes as "half-embracing" and "half-disdaining" popular television culture. Reviewer Heather Phares expressed a similar sentiment, calling "Digital Witness" a song with "close kinship" to Love This Giant.

== Critical reception ==
"Digital Witness" received positive attention from music critics. Cady Drell, in a review for Rolling Stone, gave the song 3.5 out of 5 stars, calling it "the sound of an art-pop weirdo throwing a curveball by playing it delightfully straight". Heather Phares, in an Allmusic review of St. Vincent, cited "Digital Witness" as an example of Clark's "razor-sharp wit". The track is designated as an Allmusic "pick". It placed 14th on The Village Voice's 2014 Pazz & Jop critics' poll.

== Music video ==
The music video for "Digital Witness" was directed by Chino Moya and was recorded in Madrid. The video is surreal in nature, featuring Annie Clark moving robotically, surrounded by pastel colors and geometric architecture. The style is reminiscent of the 1927 German epic film Metropolis. Upon its release, the video was praised for its visual appeal and subtle critique of contemporary music videos. Writing for SPIN, Marc Hogan described the video as depicting "dystopian conformity" in conjunction with the song's lyrical commentary on social media.

The music video was rated as the tenth-best video of 2014 by Rolling Stone.

== Remix ==
Darkside produced a remix of "Digital Witness", which was released on March 30, 2014. The remix pitch shifts Clark's vocal into a lower range. Although Darkside preserved the song's prominent saxophone, it was mixed down in favor of a bass synthesizer that they introduced. The remix was released as a 12" vinyl single, with the a cappella track from "Digital Witness" as its B-side. The track is also included with the deluxe edition of St. Vincent, which was released in February 2015.

== Track listing ==
=== 7" vinyl ===
Side A
No.	Title	Length
1.	"Digital Witness"	3:22

Side B
No.	Title	Length
1.	"Del Rio"	2:55

=== Triangular 7" ===
Side A
No.	Title	Length
1.	"Digital Witness"	3:22

Side B
No.	Title	Length
1.	"Birth in Reverse"	3:15

== Personnel ==
- Annie Clark – songwriting, vocals, guitar
- Homer Steinweiss – drums
- Ralph Carney – horns

Technical personnel

- John Congleton – engineering
- Greg Calbi – mastering
