= St. Vincent (album) =

2014 studio album by St. Vincent

- Standard edition cover

Studio album by St. Vincent
- Released: February 24, 2014
- Recorded: 2013
- Studio: Elmwood (Dallas)
- Genres: Art rock; noise pop; pop rock
- Length: 40:04
- Labels: Loma Vista; Republic
- Producer: John Congleton

St. Vincent chronology
Brass Tactics (2013)	St. Vincent (2014)	Masseduction (2017)

Singles from St. Vincent
- 1. "Birth in Reverse" Released: December 10, 2013; 2. "Digital Witness" Released: January 6, 2014; 3. "Prince Johnny" Released: May 9, 2014; 4. "Regret" Released: August 18, 2014

Deluxe edition cover
- 2015 deluxe edition

St. Vincent is the fourth studio album by American musician St. Vincent. It was released on February 24, 2014, in the United Kingdom and a day later in the United States, through Loma Vista Recordings and Republic Records. Produced by John Congleton, it features collaborations with Sharon Jones & the Dap-Kings drummer Homer Steinweiss and Midlake drummer McKenzie Smith. The tracks were arranged and demoed by Annie Clark in Austin, Texas and recorded at the Elmwood studio in Dallas.

Critically acclaimed on its release, the album won a 2015 Grammy Award for Best Alternative Music Album, making St. Vincent only the second female solo artist to win the award since its inception in 1991, when it was awarded to Sinéad O'Connor. It peaked at No. 12 in the Billboard 200 and the UK Albums Chart at No. 21, selling nearly 30,000 copies in its first week.

== Background ==
"This is a more primary colour record than I've done in the past. It's generally a bit brighter. It was less emotionally fraught than when I was writing Strange Mercy. There's an exuberance in Love This Giant, and maybe some of that carried on into this record. It's entertainment. It's fun... I did a lot of sketching for St Vincent in GarageBand before going into the studio. The process of actually recording it was less about discovery and putting the Frankenstein's monster together, and a bit more about execution. There were a lot of things that had already been decided long before I walked into the studio. It was a different experience than Strange Mercy or Actor. Recording took about six months all in, around May 2013. John and I usually work every day and take maybe one day off every ten or twelve days."

— Annie "St. Vincent" Clark

== Release ==
St. Vincent was announced on December 9, 2013, and "Birth in Reverse" was released for free download. A second single, "Digital Witness", was released on January 6, 2014. An additional release of "Digital Witness", featuring "Del Rio" as a B-side, was released in the United Kingdom on January 24, 2014.

A music video directed by Chino Moya was released on January 31, 2014, for "Digital Witness". On February 5, Clark debuted "Prince Johnny" on the radio show KCRW: Morning Becomes Eclectic. On February 9, she debuted songs at fashion designer Diane von Fürstenberg's runway show for New York Fashion Week. A music video directed by Willo Perron was released on December 16, 2014, for "Birth in Reverse".

St. Vincent entered the US Billboard 200 albums chart at No. 12 and the UK Albums Chart at No. 21, becoming St. Vincent's highest-charting album in both countries. The album sold nearly 30,000 copies in its first week.

A deluxe edition was released on February 9, 2015, in the UK, with the album available only as a digital download in the US on February 10. It featured the previously unreleased "Bad Believer"; "Del Rio", a B-side from the "Digital Witness" single and a bonus track on the Japanese edition of St. Vincent; "Digital Witness" (DARKSIDE remix), previously released as a single; and "Pietà" and "Sparrow", originally released together on a limited edition 10" pink vinyl on November 28, 2014, for Record Store Day.

== Music ==
Clark described St. Vincent as "a party record you could play at a funeral." The opening track, "Rattlesnake", is about an experience Clark had while walking in the desert, which she described as a "commune with nature". However, the opening line, "I followed the power lines back from the road", suggests that Clark is separating herself from a dependency on artificial or digital power.

Other songs have more personal connections. "I Prefer Your Love", the sixth track, is about Clark's mother, who was briefly ill. The closing track, "Severed Crossed Fingers", takes inspiration from a line in a short story by American novelist Lorrie Moore. The sentence from which the title is drawn, "He thinks of severed, crossed fingers found perfectly survived in the wreckage of a local plane crash last year", is used by Clark to convey the human heart's capacity for hope, even when hope seems futile. Of the song, Clark said, "That one's all me" in an interview with Studio 360. Later, in an interview with Pitchfork, she added, "I sang that in one fucking take, cried my eyes out, and the song was done".

Clark described St. Vincent as "more confident. I'm extending a hand; I want to connect with people. Strange Mercy, which is a record I'm proud of, [was] definitely a very accurate record of my life at a certain time, but it was more about self-laceration, all the sort of internal struggle. St. Vincent is very extroverted."

== Critical reception ==
Professional ratings
Aggregate scores
Source	Rating
AnyDecentMusic?	8.6/10
Metacritic	89/100
Review scores
Source	Rating
AllMusic	4.5/5 stars
The A.V. Club	A−
The Daily Telegraph	4/5 stars
Entertainment Weekly	A−
The Guardian	5/5 stars
The Independent	4/5 stars
NME	8/10
Pitchfork	8.6/10
Rolling Stone	4/5 stars
Spin	8/10

The album has received widespread critical acclaim. On the review aggregate site Metacritic, it scored an average score of 89 out of 100, based on 40 independent reviews, indicating "universal acclaim". AnyDecentMusic? collated reviews giving the album an average score of 8.6 based on 40 reviews. This score makes the record part of AnyDecentMusic?'s All-Time Top 10 albums. Writing for The Guardian, Alexis Petridis awarded the album a perfect five stars, calling it "an embarrassment of fantastic songs" and "a straightforward triumph".

At Rolling Stone, Jon Dolan awarded the album four stars out of five, hailing it as "her tightest, tensest, best set of songs to date, with wry, twisty beats pushing her lovably ornery melodies toward grueling revelations" and noting that "the playful way these songs contort makes pain feel like a party." Alex Denny of The Fly rated the album four-and-a-half stars out of five, describing it as "her most ebullient, ambitiously styled music to date". NME, The Guardian, musicOMH, Entertainment Weekly, and Slant Magazine named it the best album of 2014.

=== Accolades ===
Publication	Rank	List
American Songwriter	21	Top 50 Albums of 2014
The A.V. Club	3	The 20 Best Albums of 2014
Consequence of Sound	8	Top 50 Albums of 2014
Cosmopolitan	20	20 Best Albums of 2014
The Daily Telegraph	16	Best 50 Albums of 2014
Entertainment Weekly	1	10 Best Albums of 2014
Gigwise	1	Gigwise's 50 Best Albums of 2014
The Guardian	1	Best Albums of 2014
Mojo	5	50 Best Albums of 2014
musicOMH	1	Top 100 Albums of 2014
NME	1	Top 50 Albums of 2014
Pitchfork	16	Top 50 Best Albums of 2014
PopMatters	4	The 80 Best Albums of 2014
Rolling Stone	4	50 Best Albums of 2014
Slant Magazine	1	25 Best Albums of 2014
Spin	26	50 Best Albums of 2014
Stereogum	49	The 50 Best Albums of 2014
TIME	2	Top 10 Best Albums of 2014

St. Vincent won the Grammy Award for Best Alternative Music Album at the 57th Grammy Awards in 2015.

== Track listing ==
All tracks are written by Annie Clark.

St. Vincent – standard edition
No.	Title	Length
1.	"Rattlesnake"	3:34
2.	"Birth in Reverse"	3:15
3.	"Prince Johnny"	4:36
4.	"Huey Newton"	4:37
5.	"Digital Witness"	3:21
6.	"I Prefer Your Love"	3:36
7.	"Regret"	3:21
8.	"Bring Me Your Loves"	3:15
9.	"Psychopath"	3:32
10.	"Every Tear Disappears"	3:15
11.	"Severed Crossed Fingers"	3:42
Total length:		40:04

St. Vincent – Japanese edition
No.	Title	Length
12.	"Del Rio"	2:55
Total length:		42:59

St. Vincent – 2015 deluxe edition
No.	Title	Length
12.	"Bad Believer"	2:58
13.	"Pieta"	3:29
14.	"Sparrow"	3:55
15.	"Del Rio"	2:55
16.	"Digital Witness" (DARKSIDE remix)	4:20
Total length:		57:38

== Personnel ==
Credits are adapted from the St. Vincent liner notes.

Musicians

- Annie Clark – vocals, guitar
- Daniel Mintseris – synthesizer (tracks 1, 3–8, 10–15), piano (tracks 4, 7), harpsichord (track 11)
- Bobby Sparks – Minimoog (tracks 1–8, 10–15)
- Homer Steinweiss – drums (tracks 1, 3–6, 10, 13–15)
- McKenzie Smith – drums (tracks 2, 7–9, 11, 12)
- Adam Pickrell – Minimoog (track 9), keyboards (tracks 8, 9)
- Ralph Carney – horns (track 5)

Production

- John Congleton – production, recording, mixing
- Greg Calbi – mastering

Design

- Willo Perron – creative direction
- Brian Roettinger – design
- Renata Raksha – photography

== Charts ==
=== Weekly charts ===
Weekly chart performance for St. Vincent
Chart (2014)	Peak position
Australian Albums (ARIA)	54
Belgian Albums (Ultratop Flanders)	37
Belgian Albums (Ultratop Wallonia)	64
Canadian Albums (Billboard)	15
Danish Albums (Hitlisten)	18
Dutch Albums (Album Top 100)	41
French Albums (SNEP)	200
Italian Albums (FIMI)	58
Spanish Albums (Promusicae)	70
UK Albums (Official Charts)	21
US Billboard 200	12
US Top Alternative Albums (Billboard)	3
US Top Rock Albums (Billboard)	4
US Indie Store Album Sales (Billboard)	2
US Vinyl Albums (Billboard)	2

=== Year-end charts ===
Year-end chart performance for St. Vincent
Chart (2014)	Position
US Top Rock Albums	64
US Alternative Albums (Billboard)	42

== Release history ==
Release history and formats for St. Vincent
Country	Date	Label
United Kingdom	February 24, 2014	Loma Vista; Republic
United States	February 25, 2014	Loma Vista; Republic
Japan	February 26, 2014	Loma Vista
