= Tuck & Patti =

American jazz duo

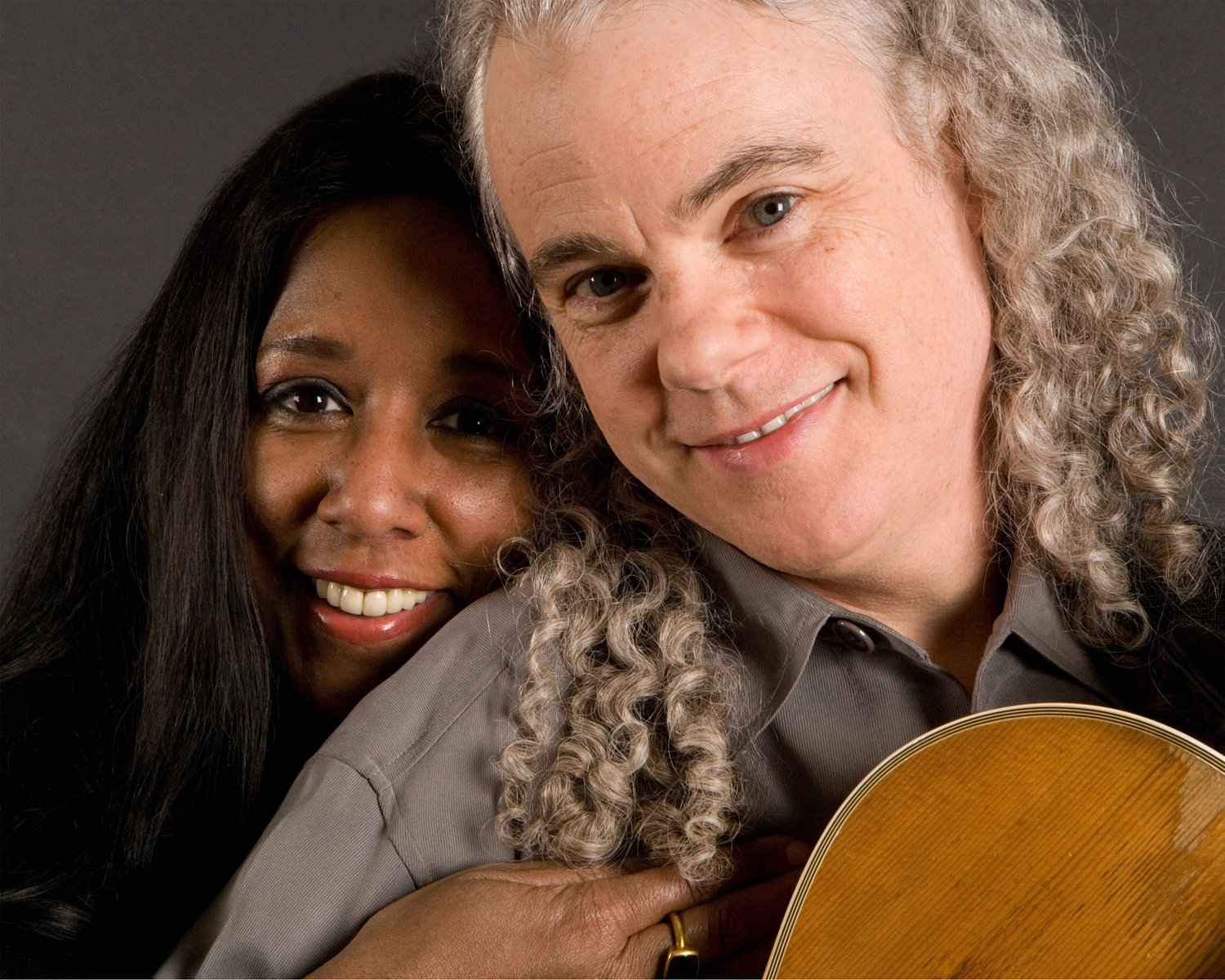

Background information
- Origin: San Francisco, California, U.S.; Tulsa, Oklahoma, U.S.
- Genres: Jazz, folk
- Years active: 1978–present
- Labels: Windham Hill, 33rd Street
- Members: Tuck Andress; Patti Cathcart
- Website: tuckandpatti.com

Tuck & Patti are an American jazz duo consisting of guitarist William Charles "Tuck" Andress (born October 28, 1952, in Tulsa, Oklahoma) and singer Patricia "Patti" Cathcart Andress (born October 4, 1949, in San Francisco).

== Music career ==
Guitarist Tuck Andress met singer Patti Cathcart at an audition in San Francisco in 1978. Before this, Andress studied classical music at Stanford and was a session musician with the Gap Band. Cathcart was also classically trained and was a member of the Brides of Funkenstein.

Andress and Cathcart married in 1983. After moving to Cathcart's hometown of San Francisco, they worked in a rock and roll cover band. They declined offers of recording contracts so they could polish their sound. In 1987, they signed with Windham Hill Jazz, a subsidiary of Windham Hill for whom they recorded their breakout album, Tears of Joy, which received airplay on jazz and pop radio stations around the U.S. They recorded several more albums for Windham Hill Jazz, then signed with Epic in 1995. They followed this with more albums for Windham Hill and 33rd Street. They started the label T&P Records, which licenses their albums for worldwide distribution. In addition to performing they teach private lessons and vocal and guitar workshops.

In The Jazz Book, the authors write that Andress uses "unusual percussive and tapping techniques to create rhythmically unbelievable effects". He plays a 1953 Gibson L-5 guitar, which he bought because it was the model played by Wes Montgomery.

His niece is singer-songwriter Annie Clark, also known as St. Vincent. As a teenager, Clark was a roadie for Tuck & Patti and was later a tour manager for them.

In 2019, they helped Denise S. Young, in co-producing her first album, Denise Young, Soprano.

== Discography ==
- Tears of Joy (Windham Hill, 1988)
- Love Warriors (Windham Hill, July 1989)
- Dream (Windham Hill, 1991)
- Learning How to Fly (Epic, 1995)
- Paradise Found (Windham Hill, 1998)
- Taking the Long Way Home (Windham Hill, 2000)
- Chocolate Moment (33rd Street, 2002)
- A Gift of Love (T&P, 2004)
- I Remember You (T&P, 2007)

Solo albums by Tuck Andress

- Reckless Precision (Windham Hill, 1990)
- Hymns, Carols, and Songs About Snow (Windham Hill, 1991)
