= Birth in Reverse =

Single by St. Vincent

from the album St. Vincent
- A-side: "Digital Witness"
- Released: December 10, 2013
- Recorded: 2013
- Genre: Dance-rock
- Length: 3:15
- Label: Loma Vista; Republic
- Songwriter: Annie Clark
- Producer: John Congleton

St. Vincent singles chronology
"Krokodil" (2012)	"Birth in Reverse" (2013)	"Digital Witness" (2014)

Music video
- "Birth in Reverse" on YouTube

"Birth in Reverse" is a song written and performed by St. Vincent, issued as the lead single from her fourth album, St. Vincent. A video featuring the audio was released on December 9, 2013, one day prior to the single's official release. A music video was released on December 16, 2014. On May 17, 2014, St. Vincent performed the song on the season finale of Saturday Night Live.

== Music video ==
The music video for "Birth in Reverse" was directed by Willo Perron, who was also the creative director for artwork surrounding St. Vincent. The video shows Annie Clark dancing and playing guitar along to the song against a starry background.

== Critical reception ==
The song has received critical acclaim from critics. Devon Maloney of Pitchfork called the song "vibrant", while Robin Smith of PopMatters commented that the song was "meant to be understood" and complimented the song's "space-fabric-ripping guitar". "Birth in Reverse" placed 56th on The Village Voice's 2014 Pazz & Jop critics' poll.

== Track listing ==
=== 7" vinyl ===
Side A
No.	Title	Length
1.	"Digital Witness"	3:22

Side B
No.	Title	Length
1.	"Birth in Reverse"	3:15

=== Digital download ===
No.	Title	Length
1.	"Birth in Reverse"	3:15
