= List of shipwrecks in 1920 =

The list of shipwrecks in 1920 includes ships sunk, foundered, grounded, or otherwise lost during 1920.

table of contents
1920
Jan	Feb	Mar	Apr
May	Jun	Jul	Aug
Sep	Oct	Nov	Dec
Unknown date

== January ==
=== 1 January ===
List of shipwrecks: 1 January 1920
Ship	State	Description
Charles H. Trickey	United States	Carrying a cargo of granite, the three-masted schooner was blown onto a reef at the entrance to the harbor at Cape Porpoise, Maine, during a storm and sank at 43°21′20″N 070°25′36″W.
Mary E. Olys	United States	Carrying a cargo of lumber, the three-masted schooner was blown onto a reef at the entrance to the harbor at Cape Porpoise, Maine, during a storm and sank at 43°21′20″N 070°25′36″W.

=== 2 January ===
List of shipwrecks: 2 January 1920
Ship	State	Description
Ernest T. Lee	United States	The schooner was abandoned in the Atlantic Ocean. Her crew were rescued by Hildebrand (United Kingdom).
Jemtland	Sweden	The liner struck a mine and sank at Herthas Flak with the loss of seven of her 26 crew.
Nicolaas	Netherlands	The cargo ship struck a mine in the North Sea off the Dogger Bank and sank with some loss of life.
Nipponier	Belgium	The cargo ship foundered in the Bay of Biscay (44°24′N 9°03′W). Her crew were rescued by Rio de Janeiro (Norway).
Roumanier	Belgium	The cargo ship caught fire whilst berthed at Antwerp, Belgium. Her hull was badly damaged and the ship was laid up. She was scrapped in 1923 at Hamburg, Germany.
Stella II	United Kingdom	The schooner was wrecked on the coast of Africa.

=== 3 January ===
List of shipwrecks: 3 January 1920
Ship	State	Description
Figueira	Portugal	The cargo ship collided with Ango (France) at Porto and was beached.

=== 4 January ===
List of shipwrecks: 4 January 1920
Ship	State	Description
San Giuseppe	Italy	The cargo ship foundered in the Bay of Biscay (46°30′N 8°56′W). Her crew were rescued by Tartar Prince (United Kingdom).

=== 5 January ===
List of shipwrecks: 5 January 1920
Ship	State	Description
Abrigada	United States	The cargo ship caught fire at Saint Michaels, Maryland and was scuttled.
Frances Gardner	United Kingdom	The schooner foundered in the Atlantic Ocean 70 nautical miles (130 km) off Cape Race, Newfoundland. Her crew were rescued by Albr. W. Selmer (Norway).
Joachim	Spain	The schooner was wrecked at Testadelaban. Her crew were rescued by Armenie (France).
Melamson Bros	United Kingdom	The schooner ran aground on Cobblers' Reef, Barbados and was wrecked with the loss of four crew.

=== 6 January ===
List of shipwrecks: 6 January 1920
Ship	State	Description
Mathilde	Denmark	The schooner came ashore at Easington, County Durham, United Kingdom and was wrecked,
Metamora	United Kingdom	The schooner was abandoned and set afire in the Atlantic Ocean. Her crew were rescued. The fire was extinguished and Metamora was towed into Saint Michaels, Maryland, United States by Lages ( Brazil).

=== 7 January ===
List of shipwrecks: 7 January 1920
Ship	State	Description
San Josefa	Italy	The auxiliary barque was abandoned in the Atlantic Ocean. Her crew were rescued by Tartar Prince (United Kingdom).

=== 8 January ===
List of shipwrecks: 8 January 1920
Ship	State	Description
Gelasma	United Kingdom	The auxiliary sailing ship came ashore 3 nautical miles (5.6 km) east of Dungeness, Kent. Her crew were rescued.
HMT Leonard	Royal Navy	The naval trawler foundered off the coast of Scotland with the loss of all nine crew.
Le Pluvier	France	The tug foundered with the loss of between 25 and 30 lives.
St. Louis	United States	The ocean liner caught fire at Hoboken, New Jersey and was scuttled. She was a total loss and was scrapped in 1925.
Spartan	France	The cargo ship sank in Rothesay Dock, Glasgow, Renfrewshire, United Kingdom.

=== 9 January ===
List of shipwrecks: 9 January 1920
Ship	State	Description
Northstar	United States	After the only person aboard was knocked unconscious while in the engine room in stormy weather, the 11-gross register ton motor vessel drifted onto a reef in Sleepy Bay (60°04′30″N 147°50′00″W) on the coast of Latouche Island off the south-central coast of the Territory of Alaska and was wrecked, becoming a constructive total loss. The vessel′s sole occupant reached safety after regaining consciousness.
Treveal	United Kingdom	The cargo ship, on her maiden voyage, ran aground on the Kimmeridge Ledge, off the coast of Dorset and broke in two. The next morning, 10 January, the crew evacuated in lifeboats and the boats capsized at Chapman's Pool, with the loss of 36 of her 43 crew. She was on a voyage from Calcutta, India to Dundee, Forfarshire.
West Avenal	United States	The Design 1019 cargo ship collided with Lancastrian (United Kingdom) in New York Harbor and was beached. She was refloated over a month later and returned to service.

=== 11 January ===
List of shipwrecks: 11 January 1920
Ship	State	Description
Auguste Charles	France	The sailing ship was driven ashore at Knapp Head, Devon, United Kingdom and was wrecked with the loss of three of her five crew.
Doyo Maru	Japan	The cargo ship departed from Chinwangtao, China for Yokohama. No further trace, presumed foundered by 15 January with the loss of all hands.

=== 12 January ===
List of shipwrecks: 12 January 1920
Ship	State	Description
Afrique	France	Chargeurs Réunis' 5,404 GRT ocean liner foundered in the Bay of Biscay 32 nautical miles (59 km) off the Île de Ré with the loss of 556 of the 599 people on board. Survivors were rescued by Ceylan (France) and another vessel.
Monte Grande	France	The schooner was driven ashore at East Wittering, Sussex, United Kingdom and was wrecked.
Serbier	Belgium	The cargo ship foundered in the Bay of Biscay 80 nautical miles (150 km) off Penmarc'h, Finistère, France (47°38′N 6°10′W). Her crew were rescued by Docteur Pierre Benoit (France).

=== 13 January ===
List of shipwrecks: 13 January 1920
Ship	State	Description
Jane and Ann	United Kingdom	The schooner was driven ashore at St. Anne's on Sea, Lancashire and was wrecked.
Willy	Norway	The cargo ship collided with Trentino (United Kingdom) in the Atlantic Ocean off the Longships and sank.

=== 15 January ===
List of shipwrecks: 15 January 1920
Ship	State	Description
HMT Denford	Royal Navy	The naval trawler ran aground at North Kearney Point, County Down. Her crew were rescued. She was refloated on 20 January.
Sancho Maru	Japan	The cargo ship foundered in the Pacific Ocean off Rikuchū Province with some loss of life.

=== 16 January ===
List of shipwrecks: 16 January 1920
Ship	State	Description
Preveza	Greece	The cargo ship came ashore at Chesil Beach, Dorset, United Kingdom and was abandoned by her crew. She was later reboarded but attempts to refloat her in the early hours on 17 January were unsuccessful.
W. T. White	United Kingdom	The schooner foundered in the Atlantic Ocean. Six crew were rescued by Marion L. Mason (United Kingdom).

=== 20 January ===
List of shipwrecks: 20 January 1920
Ship	State	Description
Fenix	Denmark	The schooner was wrecked off Skagens Head, Denmark and broke up in stormy weather.
USC&GS Isis	United States	The survey vessel/yacht suffered a breached hull on a sunken wreck and was beached to prevent sinking near St. Augustine, Florida. She was later destroyed by a storm before salvage could begin.
Lavonia	United Kingdom	The schooner caught fire in the Florida Straits off Bahía Honda, Cuba and was abandoned.
Macona	United States	The cargo ship ran aground off the Nidingen Lighthouse, Sweden and foundered with the loss of 40 of her 41 crew.

=== 21 January ===
List of shipwrecks: 21 January 1920
Ship	State	Description
Condor	Spain	The barque sprang a leak and foundered in the Atlantic Ocean 50 nautical miles (93 km) off San Juan, Puerto Rico with the loss of six of her 36 crew.

=== 23 January ===
List of shipwrecks: 23 January 1920
Ship	State	Description
Arlette	United Kingdom	The coaster was driven ashore on Walney Island, Lancashire. Her crew were rescued.
Eos	Sweden	The cargo ship was wrecked at Stoktaskeri, Iceland.
Sigvard	Sweden	The cargo ship collided with another ship off Barry, Glamorgan, United Kingdom and sank with the loss of one of her eighteen crew.

=== 24 January ===
List of shipwrecks: 24 January 1920
Ship	State	Description
Niagara	United States	The 20-gross register ton, 42.5-foot (13.0 m) halibut-fishing vessel ran aground and sank in Moira Sound in Southeast Alaska near Lane′s Cannery. She was refloated, repaired, and returned to service.
Shinten Maru	Japan	The cargo ship was driven ashore by a severe storm off Ayukawa, Miyagi prefecture, Japan. Refloated and returned to service.

=== 25 January ===
List of shipwrecks: 25 January 1920
Ship	State	Description
Marne	United States	The cargo ship suffered an explosion in her fuel tanks at Colón, Colombia and was scuttled by fire. She was a total loss.

=== 26 January ===
List of shipwrecks: 26 January 1920
Ship	State	Description
Mielero	United States	The tanker broke in two and sank in the Atlantic Ocean east of Savanna, Georgia (31°45′N 78°41′W). Her master, his wife and 2 children, and 18 crew died in a lifeboat that left and was never seen again. The rest of her crew in her other lifeboat were rescued by Ozette (United States).
Winga	Sweden	The coaster sprang a leak and foundered in the Skaggerak 12 nautical miles (22 km) north of hirtshals, Denmark with the loss of two of her twelve crew.

=== 27 January ===
List of shipwrecks: 27 January 1920
Ship	State	Description
Rennen	Norway	The cargo ship collided with Fermia (Sweden) in the North Sea off Tynemouth, United Kingdom and sank. Her crew were rescued by the pilot boat Queen o' the May (United Kingdom).

=== 28 January ===
List of shipwrecks: 28 January 1920
Ship	State	Description
Eira	Sweden	The cargo liner was driven ashore at Cimbrishamn and was a total loss. All on board were rescued.

=== 29 January ===
List of shipwrecks: 29 January 1920
Ship	State	Description
Doris Andreta	Canada	The schooner was abandoned and set afire in the Atlantic Ocean (39°03′N 22°03′W). Her crew were rescued by San Giovanni (Italy).
Fortune	United States	The steamer sank off Jekyl Island. Lost with all 13 crew.
Novara	French Navy	The Novara-class cruiser sprang a leak in the Adriatic Sea and put into Brindisi, Apulia, Italy, where she sank. She was refloated in early April. Novara was subsequently repaired and entered service with the French Navy.
Samuel Faunce	United States	The tug departed Wilmington, Delaware for Key West, Florida. No further trace, presumed foundered in the Atlantic Ocean with the loss of all crew.
Spey	United Kingdom	The cargo ship was driven ashore 7 nautical miles (13 km) south of Jaffa, British-occupied Palestine (31°52′00″N 34°30′30″E) and wrecked with the loss of a crew member.

=== 30 January ===
List of shipwrecks: 30 January 1920
Ship	State	Description
Glen Tilt	United Kingdom	The cargo ship ran aground 5 nautical miles (9.3 km) north of Scotston Head, Aberdeenshire. All fifteen crew were rescued. She was refloated on 5 February.
Hera	Sweden	The schooner came ashore at Hals, Denmark with the loss of four of her crew.
Martin	Denmark	The schooner came ashore on the south coast of Skagen with the loss of two of her crew.

=== 31 January ===
List of shipwrecks: 31 January 1920
Ship	State	Description
Nero	United Kingdom	The cargo ship foundered in the Bay of Biscay 15 nautical miles (28 km) west of Molène, Finistère, France with the loss of her captain. Survivors reached land in their lifeboats.

=== Unknown date ===
List of shipwrecks: Unknown date January 1920
Ship	State	Description
Anémone	France	The trawler ran ashore on Loe Bar, Mount's Bay, Cornwall, United Kingdom.
HMS A2	Royal Navy	While awaiting sale, the decommissioned submarine ran aground in Bomb Ketch Lake in Portsmouth Harbour on the coast of England and flooded. Her wreck was scrapped.
USC&GS Isis	United States Coast and Geodetic Survey	The survey ship struck a submerged object and sank off Crescent Beach, Florida.

== February ==
=== 1 February ===
List of shipwrecks: 1 February 1920
Ship	State	Description
Berrima	United Kingdom	The passenger ship ran aground off Margate, Kent. She was refloated the next day by the tugs HMT Firm (Royal Navy), Java, Lady Brassey, Lady Duncan and Scotia (all United Kingdom).
Ruth Hickman	United Kingdom	The schooner was driven ashore at Minard, Argyllshire and wrecked. Her crew were rescued by HMS Fearless (Royal Navy).

=== 2 February ===
List of shipwrecks: 2 February 1920
Ship	State	Description
C.J.S.	United Kingdom	The barque sprang a leak and was abandoned in the Indian Ocean off Mauritius.
Kaskaskia	United States	The cargo ship caught fire at New York and was beached.
Kenora	United Kingdom	The cargo ship was abandoned in the Bristol Channel off Lundy Island, Devon. Her crew were rescued by an Admiralty trawler.

=== 3 February ===
List of shipwrecks: 3 February 1920
Ship	State	Description
Doris Andreta	United Kingdom	The schooner sprang a leak in the Atlantic Ocean (approximately 39°N 22°W). She was set afire and abandoned.

=== 4 February ===
List of shipwrecks: 4 February 1920
Ship	State	Description
Francis Molison	United Kingdom	The schooner foundered in the North Sea 9 nautical miles (17 km) off the mouth of the River Tyne. Her crew were rescued by the trawler Dover Patrol (United Kingdom).
Maine	United States	The 310-foot (94 m), 1,505-gross register ton steam screw passenger ship was wrecked without loss of life at the western end of Long Island Sound off the Cow Neck Peninsula on the North Shore of Long Island, New York, 100 yards (91 m) off the Execution Rocks Light when pack ice pushed her onto rocks during a gale and snowstorm with very high tides. Her wreck sank in 15 feet (4.6 m) of water and was stripped and burned in place.
Sterling	United Kingdom	The auxiliary schooner sank in Tees Bay.
Ville d'Alger	France	The cargo ship caught fire in the Indian Ocean off Réunion. She was abandoned at approximately 18°S 52°E.

=== 5 February ===
List of shipwrecks: 5 February 1920
Ship	State	Description
Sybil	France	The cargo ship collided with Veratyr (Denmark) off Barry, Glamorgan, United Kingdom and was beached.

=== 6 February ===
List of shipwrecks: 6 February 1920
Ship	State	Description
Bradboyne	United Kingdom	The cargo ship was abandoned in the Atlantic Ocean (43°36′N 36°10′W) after her cargo shifted. Six of her 31 crew were lost. Survivors were rescued by Monmouth (United States) and Oxonian (United Kingdom), which lost thirteen crew during the rescue when a lifeboat capsized.
Brookland	United States	The cargo ship caught fire at Havana, Cuba. She sank and was a total loss.
Hyltonia	United Kingdom	The cargo ship ran aground off Saint-Clément-des-Baleines, Finistère, France. Her crew were rescued. She was refloated on 5 March.
Polias	United States	The 268 foot 2,500-gross register ton cargo ship — a concrete ship — ran aground on Old Cilly Ledge, a reef off Port Clyde, Maine, in a blizzard. Eleven crew members abandoned ship against orders and died when their lifeboat was smashed against the hull. The rest of the crew left in boats the next day when she started breaking up and were rescued by the cutter USCGC Acushnet ( United States Coast Guard). The wreck later slid off the reef and sank in up to 40 feet (12 m) of water at (43°53′16″N 069°15′24″W).
Princess Anne	United States	While trying to enter New York Harbor during a storm, the passenger ship ran aground on the Rockaway Shoals off Long Island, New York. A United States Life-Saving Service lifeboat took her 32 passengers off on 7 February. Her crew of 74 remained aboard until she began to break up on 15 February, and her crew were taken off before she broke in two later that day. She sank in 20 feet (6 m) of water and remained visible for many years before becoming buried in sand.

=== 10 February ===
List of shipwrecks: 10 February 1920
Ship	State	Description
Pylos	Germany	The cargo ship ran aground at Spannholmen, Utsira, Norway. She broke in two; the stern section sank with the loss of ten of her crew.

=== 11 February ===
List of shipwrecks: 11 February 1920
Ship	State	Description
Douglas Adams	Canada	The schooner sprang a leak and was abandoned in the Atlantic Ocean 20 nautical miles (37 km) north north east of Castro, Spain. Her crew were rescued by Spanish fishing boats. Douglas Adams was later towed into Bilbao.
Gregor	Germany	The passenger ship ran aground at Kylios, Ottoman Turkey. She broke up and was a total loss. One hundred and fifty of her 200 passengers were rescued by rocket apparatus.
Imperator Pierre le Grand	France	The cargo ship struck a mine and sank in the Black Sea off Varna, Romania. Her crew survived.
Northwestern	United States	The tanker caught fire at Galveston, Texas and was beached. She burnt out and was a total loss.
West Aleta	United States	The Design 1019 cargo ship ran aground on Terschelling, Netherlands. Her crew were rescued.

=== 13 February ===
List of shipwrecks: 13 February 1920
Ship	State	Description
Giacomo Pittalugo	Italy	The schooner foundered off the coast of Spanish Morocco. Her crew survived.
Marie Louise H	United Kingdom	The schooner sprang a leak in the Atlantic Ocean (34°08′N 15°32′W). She was set afire and abandoned. All on board were rescued by Molière (France):
Sahara	France	The cargo ship sprang a leak in the Atlantic Ocean off the coast of Portugal. She was beached at Leixões.

=== 14 February ===
List of shipwrecks: 14 February 1920
Ship	State	Description
Edindoune	United Kingdom	The motor fishing vessel caught fire in Scapa Flow and sank; the crew of four reached shore.
Nobility	United Kingdom	The schooner came ashore on the east coast of Barbados and was wrecked.

=== 15 February ===
List of shipwrecks: 15 February 1920
Ship	State	Description
Regina	Norway	The schooner was discovered abandoned in the North Sea. Her crew were rescued by Fritiof (Sweden). Regina was towed into IJmuiden, Netherland by the trawler Eendracht II (Netherlands).

=== 18 February ===
List of shipwrecks: 18 February 1920
Ship	State	Description
Amelia Zeman	United States	The schooner departed from Norfolk, Virginia for Puerto Plata, Dominican Republic. No further trace, presumed foundered in the Atlantic Ocean with the loss of all hands.
Joan Hickman	United Kingdom	The schooner was driven ashore near Chipiona, province of Cádiz, Spain. Her crew were rescued by Cabo Roche (Spain).
Rostellan	United States	The four-masted schooner sprang a leak in the Atlantic Ocean and was abandoned. Her crew were rescued.

=== 20 February ===
List of shipwrecks: 20 February 1920
Ship	State	Description
Aghia Paraskevi	Greece	The cargo ship was wrecked off Cape St. Thomas, Argentina with the loss of 15 of her crew. Survivors were rescued by Carnarvonshire (United Kingdom).
Commandant Dorise	France	The cargo ship was destroyed by fire at Marseille, Bouches-du-Rhône.
Kamma	Denmark	The schooner was driven ashore on the south coast of Skagen and was wrecked. Her crew were rescued by a lifeboat.

=== 21 February ===
List of shipwrecks: 21 February 1920
Ship	State	Description
City of Cologne	United Kingdom	The cargo ship collided with another vessel and was beached at Barry Island, Glamorgan.

=== 22 February ===
List of shipwrecks: 22 February 1920
Ship	State	Description
Valdez	United States	The 12 GRT 35.7-foot (10.9 m) cargo ship was wrecked in Portage Bay near Kanatak, Territory of Alaska. All four people on board survived.

=== 23 February ===
List of shipwrecks: 23 February 1920
Ship	State	Description
Hilton	United Kingdom	The full-rigged ship collided with Fahrwold (Finland) in the River Plate and sank with the loss of seven of her crew. Survivors were rescued by Cabo Santa Maria (Spain).
Kemmel	United Kingdom	The turret deck ship caught fire at São Vicente, Cape Verde, Portugal. She was beached but was declared a total loss on 6 April.
Maria I	Norway	The auxiliary schooner caught fire in the North Sea and was abandoned. Her crew were rescued by the trawler Nairana (United Kingdom).
Strathord	United Kingdom	The fishing trawler struck a mine in the North Sea and sank with the loss of all nine crew.

=== 24 February ===
List of shipwrecks: 24 February 1920
Ship	State	Description
Gwendolen Warren	United Kingdom	The schooner foundered in the Atlantic Ocean. Her crew were rescued by Pikepool (United Kingdom).

=== 25 February ===
List of shipwrecks: 25 February 1920
Ship	State	Description
Osnabruck	Reichsmarine	The Osnabruck-class Vorpostenboot was sunk by a mine.

=== 26 February ===
List of shipwrecks: 26 February 1920
Ship	State	Description
Llovet Hermanos	Spain	The schooner was destroyed by fire at Valencia.

=== 27 February ===
List of shipwrecks: 27 February 1920
Ship	State	Description
Carrier Dove	United States	The schooner ran aground on a reef at Levuka, Fiji.

=== 28 February ===
List of shipwrecks: 28 February 1920
Ship	State	Description
Gallacier	Belgium	The cargo ship foundered in the Atlantic Ocean (36°22′N 7°08′W).
Lucanio Manara	Italy	The cargo ship was destroyed by fire in the Sea of Marmara.
Schiedam	Netherlands	The schooner ran aground at Hook of Holland, South Holland. Her crew were rescued by rocket apparatus.
War Casco	United Kingdom	The cargo ship caught fire at Gibraltar and was a total loss.

=== 29 February ===
List of shipwrecks: 29 February 1920
Ship	State	Description
Cubadist	United States	The cargo ship was reported to be 111 nautical miles (206 km) south of Cape Hatteras, North Carolina. No further trace was found, and the ship presumed foundered with the loss of all 40 of her crew.
Pregel	Denmark	The cargo ship ran aground at Esbjerg. Her crew were rescued by HDMS Absalom (Royal Danish Navy).
Tungus	Norway	The cargo ship ran aground on Cayo Arenas, Puerto Rico. She was refloated on 10 March.

=== Unknown date ===
List of shipwrecks: Unknown date February 1920
Ship	State	Description
Delight	United States	The 11-gross register ton, 35.1-foot (10.7 m) motor vessel broke apart while on the ways at Ketchikan, Territory of Alaska.
Zante	(Russian Empire) Armed Forces of South Russia	The incomplete Fidonisy-class destroyer was driven ashore and wrecked at Bolshoy Fontan whilst being towed from Nicholaieff to Odesa. She was refloated in September and towed to Nicholaieff. Subsequently completed and entered service with the Soviet Navy as Nezamozhnik.

== March ==
=== 1 March ===
List of shipwrecks: 1 March 1920
Ship	State	Description
Bohemian	United Kingdom	The cargo liner ran aground off Sambro, Nova Scotia, Canada. She broke in two on 2 March, and was a total loss. Five of her crew were killed.
Tinto	United Kingdom	The cargo liner ran aground on the wreck of Manorbier Castle (United Kingdom). She refloated but was holed and sank. Her crew were rescued. She was damaged by an explosion during salvage operations on 4 March. Tinto was refloated in early June. She arrived at Grimsby, Lincolnshire for drydocking on 3 June.

=== 2 March ===
List of shipwrecks: 2 March 1920
Ship	State	Description
Moccasin	United States	The cargo ship sank at New York.
Sydnæs	Norway	After springing a leak in a heavy gale, the barque, on a voyage from Norfolk, Virginia to Montevideo, Uruguay, was abandoned in the Atlantic Ocean (36°50′N 50°15′W or 36°45′N 60°20′W). Excepting one fatality, the crew were rescued from two boats: twelve on 8 or 12 March by steamer Elba (Italy) and twelve by 16 March by steamer Vaarli (Norway).

=== 3 March ===
List of shipwrecks: 3 March 1920
Ship	State	Description
Old Head	United Kingdom	The schooner struck the breakwater at Cherbourg, Seine-Inférieure, France and sank.

=== 5 March ===
List of shipwrecks: 5 March 1920
Ship	State	Description
Magnhel	United States	After the 9-gross register ton fishing vessel's propeller shaft broke, her anchor cables parted and she drifted ashore in heavy weather and was wrecked at Cora Point (55°54′10″N 134°47′15″W) on Coronation Island in Southeast Alaska. Her crew of three reached shore safely and was rescued on 7 March by the motor vessel My Fancy (United States).

=== 6 March ===
List of shipwrecks: 6 March 1920
Ship	State	Description
Bratto	United Kingdom	The cargo ship was abandoned in the Bristol Channel. Her crew were rescued by St. Louis (United States). Bratto was towed into Padstow, where she sank.
Dunstan	United Kingdom	The cargo ship ran aground at Tutoya, Maranhão, Brazil. She was refloated on 17 March.

=== 7 March ===
List of shipwrecks: 7 March 1920
Ship	State	Description
Pere Marquette No. 3	United States	The cargo ship was sunk by ice in Lake Michigan three miles (4.8 km) south west of Ludington, Michigan in 43 feet (13 m) of water. Raised on 11 or 26 July and taken to Manitowoc, Wisconsin. Declared a total loss and broken up in 1921.

=== 8 March ===
List of shipwrecks: 8 March 1920
Ship	State	Description
Brookfield	United States	The cargo ship caught fire at Faial Island, Azores, Portugal and was a total loss. Her crew were rescued.
Guildford	United States	The cargo ship sprang a leak and was abandoned off the Bujho Shoal in the Atlantic Ocean off the coast of Massachusetts. She was later towed into Vineyard Haven, arriving on 10 March.
USS H-1	United States Navy	The H-class submarine ran aground off Magdalena Bay, Baja California Sur, with the loss of four crew. She sank during salvage attempts on 24 March.
Lejok	United States	The schooner was abandoned in the Atlantic Ocean off the coast of Florida. Her crew were rescued by W. S. Rheem (United States).
Natenna	United States	The cargo ship was driven ashore at Casablanca, French Morocco and was a total loss.
Vénézuela	France	The cargo liner was driven ashore at Casablanca and was a total loss. Her crew were rescued.

=== 10 March ===
List of shipwrecks: 10 March 1920
Ship	State	Description
Jutland	Canada	The beam trawler departed Halifax, Nova Scotia, Canada, and was not seen or heard from again. On 11 March, the trawler Lemberg (Canada) discovered two damaged dories in the Atlantic Ocean 86 nautical miles (160 kilometers) southeast of Halifax, one of them containing the body of one of Jutland's crew members. No trace of the other 20 men on board ever was found.

=== 11 March ===
List of shipwrecks: 11 March 1920
Ship	State	Description
Hilda Rachel	Spain	The cargo ship caught fire and foundered whilst on a voyage from Penarth, Glamorgan, United Kingdom to Gibraltar. Her crew were rescued.
Maid of La Have	United Kingdom	The schooner was abandoned in the Atlantic Ocean 500 nautical miles (930 km) east of New York, United States. Her crew were rescued by Adriatic (United Kingdom).
Per Marquette 3	United States	The passenger ship was crushed by ice and sank in Lake Michigan off Ludington, Michigan. All 35 people on board were rescued.
San Juan #3	United States	Under tow by a tug during a voyage along the coast of the Territory of Alaska from Port Althorp to Unakwik Inlet in Prince William Sound with a 10-ton deck load of cannery supplies, the 24-ton scow sank in the Gulf of Alaska about 6 nautical miles (11 km; 6.9 mi) offshore at 59°11′N 139°05′W.

=== 12 March ===
List of shipwrecks: 12 March 1920
Ship	State	Description
Carroo	United Kingdom	The cargo ship suffered an onboard explosion in her cargo of benzine with the loss of a crew member. She caught fire and was beached at Townsville, Queensland, Australia.
Commandant Mages	France	The ocean liner ran aground 20 nautical miles (37 km) east of Hong Kong. She was refloated on 25 March.
Henriette	flag unknown	The sailing ship sank at Bordeaux, Gironde, France.
Llai Llai	Chile	The cargo ship collided with O'Higgins (Chilean Navy) at Philadelphia, Pennsylvania, United States and sank.

=== 13 March ===
List of shipwrecks: 13 March 1920
Ship	State	Description
Alexandra	United Kingdom	The tug foundered in the River Humber with the loss of three of her four crew. She was refloated on 10 May.
Alfonzo	United States	The cargo ship was destroyed by fire at Manila, Philippines.
Chatcauqua	United States	The cargo ship ran aground off Bermuda. Her crew were rescued.
Olockson	United States	The cargo ship caught fire in the Gulf of Panama 100 nautical miles (190 km) off Panama City, Colombia. She was taken under tow by Gorgona (United States) Her crew abandoned on 17 March. Olockson was beached at Balboa and the hull holed to fight the fires.
T94	Reichsmarine	Kapp-Lüttwitz Putsch: The training ship, a former S90-class torpedo boat, was scuttled by Putschists at Wilhelmshaven. Later raised and broken up.
Yungai	United Kingdom	The cargo ship issued a SOS in the Atlantic Ocean (30°10′N 77°00′W). She was abandoned and her crew were rescued by Limos (United States).

=== 14 March ===
List of shipwrecks: 14 March 1920
Ship	State	Description
Unknown barges	United States	Two barges, under tow of Georges Creek (United States), sank in heavy weather in Block Island Sound. Between the two crews five died.

=== 15 March ===
List of shipwrecks: 15 March 1920
Ship	State	Description
Dove	United States	The 26-gross register ton, 48.7-foot (14.8 m) motor cargo vessel was wrecked at Cape Ommaney (56°10′00″N 134°40′20″W) in Southeast Alaska with the loss of two lives. There were three survivors.
Lux	France	The cargo ship departed from Marseille, Bouches-du-Rhône, France, bound for Oran, Algeria. No further trace, presumed foundered in the Mediterranean Sea with the loss of all hands.
Mingai	United States	The steamer sprung a leak and sank three days later in a storm in the Atlantic Ocean south east of Wilmington, North Carolina.(33°20′N 76°57′W).

=== 16 March ===
List of shipwrecks: 16 March 1920
Ship	State	Description
Balabac	United States	The cargo ship was destroyed by fire at a Trinidadian port.
Dashing Wave	United States	During a voyage from Seattle, Washington, to Taku via Ketchikan in the Territory of Alaska with a crew of nine and a cargo of general cannery supplies aboard, the 1,054-gross register ton barge was wrecked without loss of life off Shelter Point (49.9307°N 125.1849°W) on the coast of Vancouver Island in British Columbia, Canada. The steamer San Juan (flag unknown) towed her wreck to shore, but it was declared a total loss.
Rosa Harriette	United Kingdom	The schooner sprang a leak and foundered in the English Channel off St Catherine's Point, Isle of Wight. Her crew were rescued by Odland (Norway) after 16 hours adrift.

=== 17 March ===
List of shipwrecks: 17 March 1920
Ship	State	Description
Adolf	Sweden	The cargo ship collided with Moliere (United Kingdom) in the Bristol Channel off Barry, Glamorgan, United Kingdom and was beached. A fire broke out on 18 March.
Cadrier	France	The cargo ship sprang a leak in the English Channel north of Alderney, Channel Isles and sank. Four of her 23 crew were rescued by Wagland (Norway).
Tewkesbury	United Kingdom	The cargo ship was driven ashore at Cape Vine, Nova Scotia, Canada and was wrecked. Her crew were rescued.

=== 18 March ===
List of shipwrecks: 18 March 1920
Ship	State	Description
USS Althea	United States Navy	The 60 foot motorboat was sunk by ice at Detroit, Michigan. She was sold for salvage while still sunk on 20 March but salvage efforts were abandoned in 1926.
Cordier	France	During her first commercial trip from Nantes (region Pays de la Loire, France) to Rotterdam (Netherlands) loaded with iron ore, sank following a leak north of Alderney Channel Islands. 19 perished, only 4 sailors were rescued by the Norwegian steamer Wacland.
Eva	Denmark	The cargo ship came ashore on the west coast of Skagen. Her crew survived.
Jeremiah Smith	United States	The schooner foundered in the Atlantic Ocean. Her crew were rescued by Hatteras (United States).

=== 19 March ===
List of shipwrecks: 19 March 1920
Ship	State	Description
Scandia	United States	The 116-gross register ton, 90.8-foot (27.7 m) fishing vessel was stranded in the Gulf of Alaska on the north end of Montague Island at the entrance to Prince William Sound in the Territory of Alaska. All 17 people on board survived. She was salvaged, repaired, and returned to service.

=== 20 March ===
List of shipwrecks: 20 March 1920
Ship	State	Description
Gladys Strut	United Kingdom	The three-masted schooner sprang a leak in the Atlantic Ocean (48°10′N 19°30′W). She was set afire and abandoned; her crew were rescued by Major Wheeler (United States).
Jerx G. Shaw	United States	The schooner was driven ashore on Block Island, Rhode Island. Her crew were rescued.
White Rose	United Kingdom	The cargo ship collided with Fantee (United Kingdom) in the Bristol Channel 8 nautical miles (15 km) off Trevose Head, Cornwall and sank. Her crew were rescued by Fantee.

=== 22 March ===
List of shipwrecks: 22 March 1920
Ship	State	Description
Ambar	Portugal	The whaler was wrecked in the Congo River at Loanda, Portuguese East Africa. Some of her passengers and crew were rescued.
Kara	United Kingdom	The cargo ship was wrecked off Cape Quintres, Santoña, Spain. Her crew were rescued.
Rock Island Bridge	United States	The cargo ship collided with tanker Iroquois (United Kingdom) in the English Channel 8 nautical miles (15 km) south south east of The Lizard, Cornwall, United Kingdom. She was taken in tow by Kenosha (United States) beached in the Helford River but subsequently sank. Later raised and sold for scrap. The wreck was sold by auction in May 1920.

=== 24 March ===
List of shipwrecks: 24 March 1920
Ship	State	Description
City of St. Helens	United States	The auxiliary schooner caught fire and was abandoned in the Atlantic Ocean off the east coast of the United States.
USS H-1	United States Navy	The H-class submarine ran aground on a reef off Isla Margarita, Baja California, Mexico in stormy weather and high seas on 12 March. Three crewmen drowned trying to reach shore and her captain was washed overboard from the conning tower and drowned. Survivors were rescued from shore by Mazatlan (flag unknown). She was pulled off by USS Vestal (United States Navy) on 24 March and taken under tow but sank an hour later in 50 feet (15 m) of water. Wreck was sold for scrap.
HMS Moorview	Royal Navy	The naval mooring vessel, on a voyage from Belfast to Plymouth, struck the Runnel Stone, off Gwennap Head, Cornwall, England, in fog and sank. The crew reached shore in the ship's boats.
Mutlah	United Kingdom	The cargo ship caught fire at Naples, Italy, and sank.
Teje	Norway	The cargo ship collided with Mimer (Norway) off Kristiansand, Norway, and was beached.

=== 25 March ===
List of shipwrecks: 25 March 1920
Ship	State	Description
Botanist	United Kingdom	The cargo liner ran aground on the Komuriya Reef, off the coast of Ceylon. Her passengers were rescued by Arracan (United Kingdom). She was declared a total loss on 30 March. Her crew were rescued.

=== 27 March ===
List of shipwrecks: 27 March 1920
Ship	State	Description
Inga	France	The cargo ship ran aground at Villa San Giovanni, Calabria, Italy. She was refloated on 31 March.
Picardie or Picardy	not known	The cargo ship reported in collision with New Londoner (United Kingdom) in the North Sea (or in the Scheldt, off Hansweert) and either sank or returned to Antwerp.
Ugor	Soviet Navy	The Bars-class submarine was sunk by ice in the Neva. The submarine was later salvaged.

=== 28 March ===
List of shipwrecks: 28 March 1920
Ship	State	Description
Crostafels	United Kingdom	The cargo ship ran aground on the Ceiba Bank, off the coast of Cuba. She was later refloated and arrived at Kingston, Jamaica on 5 March.
Moskvityanin	(Russia) White Movement	Russian Civil War: The Emir Bukharski-class destroyer, sunk in May 1919 and refloated on 10 January 1920 but not repaired, was scuttled by gunfire in the Caspian Sea by ships of the Caspian Flotilla of the White Movement.

=== 29 March ===
List of shipwrecks: 29 March 1920
Ship	State	Description
City of St. Helens	United States	The sailing vessel caught fire and sank in the Atlantic Ocean 80 miles off Cape Hatteras, North Carolina.
Kitagawa Maru	Japan	The cargo ship sprang a leak and was abandoned off Chōsi, Chica.
Ribble	United Kingdom	The trawler was sunk by a mine 12 miles northeast of the North Dogger Bank Light. Crew rescued by trawler "Bempton" (United Kingdom).

=== 30 March ===
List of shipwrecks: 30 March 1920
Ship	State	Description
Prince John	United Kingdom	The cargo ship collided with Prince Albert (United Kingdom) off Deadtree Point, British Columbia, Canada and was beached. She was refloated on 8 April.

=== 31 March ===
List of shipwrecks: 31 March 1920
Ship	State	Description
Frances R	United States	The 13-gross register ton motor vessel struck a rock, drifted ashore, and was smashed to pieces by the surf at Lyman Point (55°32′30″N 132°16′35″W) in Southeast Alaska after her gasoline engine broke down during a snowstorm with high winds. The two people on board survived.
Prince Pozharsky	(Russian Empire) White Movement	Russian Civil War: The gunboat was damaged by a mine in the Caspian Sea and scuttled by Dmitry Donskoy ( (Russian Empire) White Movement).

=== Unknown date ===
List of shipwrecks: Unknown date March 1920
Ship	State	Description
USS Brown	United States Navy	The minesweeping tug sank at Naval Air Station Wildwood, Cape May, New Jersey.
Kerowlee	United States	The cargo ship was wrecked in the Weser, Germany in late March. She broke in two on 25 March.

== April ==
=== 1 April ===
List of shipwrecks: 1 April 1920
Ship	State	Description
Murre	United States Bureau of Fisheries	The fishery patrol vessel struck a rock in Keku Strait in the Territory of Alaska and was beached to prevent her from sinking. She was refloated, repaired, and returned to service.

=== 2 April ===
List of shipwrecks: 2 April 1920
Ship	State	Description
USCGC Leader	United States Coast Guard	The motorboat was destroyed by fire.
Saffo	Regia Marina	The torpedo boat sank after running aground on the coast of Ottoman Turkey near Scalanova Bay.

=== 3 April ===
List of shipwrecks: 3 April 1920
Ship	State	Description
Britannia	United Kingdom	The cargo ship foundered in North Sea off Robin Hood's Bay, Yorkshire. All sixteen crew survived.
Rosegg	Norway	The cargo ship ran aground at Goswick, Northumberland, United Kingdom.
Sologne	France	The tug came ashore at Ryhope, County Durham, United Kingdom and sank.
Steinsund	Norway	The four-masted barque departed Bordeaux, France, for Newport News, Virginia, United States. No further trace, presumed foundered in the Atlantic Ocean with the loss of all hands.

=== 4 April ===
List of shipwrecks: 4 April 1920
Ship	State	Description
Malabar	United Kingdom	The cargo ship ran aground near the Barns Ness Lighthouse, Lothian. Her crew were rescued. She broke in two on 6 April.

=== 5 April ===
List of shipwrecks: 5 April 1920
Ship	State	Description
Aughinish	United Kingdom	The cargo ship struck a submerged object and was beached on Montague Island, New South Wales, Australia. She was refloated on 12 April.
Verdun	France	The auxiliary schooner caught fire in the River Seine and was a total loss.

=== 7 April ===
List of shipwrecks: 7 April 1920
Ship	State	Description
Olinda	United States	The cargo ship ran aground off Manati, Cuba. She was refloated on 14 April.

=== 8 April ===
List of shipwrecks: 8 April 1920
Ship	State	Description
Caspian	(Soviet Union) Red Movement	Russian Civil War: The auxiliary cruiser foundered in a storm in the Caspian Sea with the loss of 52 of her 65 crew. Survivors were rescued by the destroyer Proletarskiy ( (Soviet Union) Red Movement). Caspian was raised in 1934, repaired and returned to service as a transport.
Clutha	United Kingdom	The cargo ship sprang a leak at Manzanillo, Cuba and was beached. She was refloated on 13 April.

=== 10 April ===
List of shipwrecks: 10 April 1920
Ship	State	Description
Powel	United States	The cargo ship was abandoned in the Atlantic Ocean off the coast of Florida. Her crew survived.

=== 11 April ===
List of shipwrecks: 11 April 1920
Ship	State	Description
Bastia	Italy	The cargo ship caught fire at Naples. She was scuttled the next day.
Roye	France	The auxiliary sailing vessel arrived at Salonica, Greece on fire. She was a total loss.

=== 12 April ===
List of shipwrecks: 12 April 1920
Ship	State	Description
Zilia	Italy	The auxiliary sailing vessel caught fire at Porto, Portugal and was scuttled.

=== 13 April ===
List of shipwrecks: 13 April 1920
Ship	State	Description
Meditation	United Kingdom	The schooner was abandoned in the Atlantic Ocean 5 nautical miles (9.3 km) north of Faial Island, Azores, Portugal.

=== 14 April ===
List of shipwrecks: 14 April 1920
Ship	State	Description
Flensburg	Germany	The fishing trawler struck a mine and sank in the North Sea off List, Schleswig-Holstein.

=== 15 April ===
List of shipwrecks: 15 April 1920
Ship	State	Description
Eagle Wing	United States	The schooner sprang a leak and was beached at Santa Cruz del Norte, Cuba.

=== 16 April ===
List of shipwrecks: 16 April 1920
Ship	State	Description
Svelviksand I	Norway	The auxiliary sailing ship was wrecked on the Knock Sand, North Sea. Her crew sought refuge on the Knock Lightship ( Trinity House).

=== 18 April ===
List of shipwrecks: 18 April 1920
Ship	State	Description
William O'Brien	United States	The cargo ship probably foundered on this date. She had issued a SOS that she was leaking in a severe storm and had lost her cargo hatches in the Atlantic Ocean (40°00′N 65°50′W) which was answered by Baltic and Minniekahda (both United Kingdom), some debris was found. Lost with all 40 hands.

=== 19 April ===
List of shipwrecks: 19 April 1920
Ship	State	Description
St. Barcran	United Kingdom	The coaster collided with Whinhill (United Kingdom) at Liverpool, Lancashire and was beached. She was later refloated and taken to Manchester.

=== 20 April ===
List of shipwrecks: 20 April 1920
Ship	State	Description
Bayonnaise	France	The schooner foundered in the Bristol Channel. Her crew were rescued by the Mumbles Lifeboat.

=== 22 April ===
List of shipwrecks: 22 April 1920
Ship	State	Description
Matilde	United Kingdom	The schooner was driven ashore at Whitby, Yorkshire and was wrecked.

=== 24 April ===
List of shipwrecks: 24 April 1920
Ship	State	Description
Arthur V. S. Woodruff	United States	The schooner came ashore on the east coast of Barbados. She was a total loss.
Ernst	Sweden	The sailing ship struck a mine at Herthas Flak in Kattegat on 24 or 25 April and sank with all hands, 22 in all.
Westgate	United Kingdom	The cargo ship was abandoned in the Atlantic Ocean.

=== 27 April ===
List of shipwrecks: 27 April 1920
Ship	State	Description
Gubitelnyy	(Soviet Union) Red Movement	Polish-Soviet War: The gunboat was shelled and sunk at Chernobyl on the Pripyat River by Polish artillery. Salvaged post war.

=== Unknown date ===
List of shipwrecks: Unknown date April 1920
Ship	State	Description
Brisk	United States	The schooner caught fire in the Atlantic Ocean in early April. Her crew were rescued by Hellenes (United Kingdom).
Gladys Street	United Kingdom	The sailing ship was abandoned in the Atlantic Ocean. Her crew were rescued by Major Wheeler (United States).
J. T Ralston	Canada	The schooner caught fire in the Caribbean Sea. Her crew were rescued by USS Chemung (United States Navy).

== May ==
=== 2 May ===
List of shipwrecks: 2 May 1920
Ship	State	Description
Latona	United Kingdom	The barquentine foundered in the Atlantic Ocean 17 nautical miles (31 km) west of Tory Island, County Donegal. Her crew were rescued.

=== 3 May ===
List of shipwrecks: 3 May 1920
Ship	State	Description
Munamar	United States	The passenger ship ran aground on Watling Island, Bahamas. All eighty passengers and crew were rescued by Athenic (United Kingdom). She was later refloated and beached. Munamar was refloated on 20 May.
Notre Dame d'Arvour	France	The barque came ashore on Wardang Island, South Australia. She was later gutted by fire.
Risør	Norway	The auxiliary schooner caught fire in the Atlantic Ocean (approximately 40°N 68°W and was abandoned. Her crew were rescued by City of Canton (United Kingdom).

=== 4 May ===
List of shipwrecks: 4 May 1920
Ship	State	Description
Benito Suarez	Spain	The three-masted schooner was wrecked in Bay Limonade, Haiti. Her crew were rescued.

=== 5 May ===
List of shipwrecks: 5 May 1920
Ship	State	Description
Joseph Leopold	United States	The four-masted schooner ran aground on the Silver Bank, in the Atlantic Ocean off the coast of the Dominican Republic, and was a total loss.

=== 6 May ===
List of shipwrecks: 6 May 1920
Ship	State	Description
Sunshine	United Kingdom	The schooner struck a sunken wreck at Zeebrugge, West Flanders, Belgium and sank. Her crew were rescued.

=== 9 May ===
List of shipwrecks: 9 May 1920
Ship	State	Description
Harlsywood	United Kingdom	The cargo ship ran aground at Melilla, Spain. She was refloated on 25 May.
Merkur	Finland	The cargo ship collided with Castro Alen (Spain) in the Bristol Channel off Barry, Glamorgan, United Kingdom and sank. Her crew were rescued by a pilot cutter. Salvage efforts were abandoned in September 1920.
USAT Northern Pacific	United States	The United States Army troopship ran aground on Collnas Shoal at the entrance to the harbor at San Juan, Puerto Rico. She was refloated and underway again the next day.
Windrush	United States	The barque collided with Buenos Aires (Spain) in the Atlantic Ocean 1,000 nautical miles (1,900 km) east of Sandy Hook, New Jersey and sank with the loss of five crew.

=== 10 May ===
List of shipwrecks: 10 May 1920
Ship	State	Description
Tibermede	United Kingdom	The cargo ship ran aground near the Cabo Carvoeiro Lighthouse, Portugal. Her crew were rescued; the ship was declared a total loss.

=== 11 May ===
List of shipwrecks: 11 May 1920
Ship	State	Description
Shusana	United States	The 49-gross register ton, 79.8-foot (24.3 m) sternwheel paddle steamer was wrecked on the Tanana River near Nenana Territory of Alaska. All 11 people on board survived.

=== 12 May ===
List of shipwrecks: 12 May 1920
Ship	State	Description
Lake Stobi	United States	The Design 1099 cargo ship ran aground off the Koshiki Lighthouse, Gotō Islands, Japan and was wrecked.

=== 13 May ===
List of shipwrecks: 13 May 1920
Ship	State	Description
Florence Thurlow	United States	The schooner collided with Laramie (United States) off New York and was abandoned. Her crew were rescued by Laramie.
RIMS Mayo	Royal Navy	The Royal Indian Marine transport Mayo collided with Arankola (United Kingdom) at Rangoon and was run ashore. She became a total loss

=== 15 May ===
List of shipwrecks: 15 May 1920
Ship	State	Description
Padouk	United Kingdom	The barque ran aground 4 nautical miles (7.4 km) off Bassein, Burma. Her crew abandoned ship in the lifeboats.
Tenzan Maru	Japan	The cargo ship departed Montevideo, Uruguay for Antwerp, Belgium. No further trace, presumed foundered with the loss of all hands.

=== 16 May ===
List of shipwrecks: 16 May 1920
Ship	State	Description
Lake Grafton	United States	The Design 1093 cargo ship ran aground on the Runnel Stone, off the coast of Cornwall, United Kingdom and was wrecked. Her crew were rescued.

=== 17 May ===
List of shipwrecks: 17 May 1920
Ship	State	Description
Clewbay	United Kingdom	The cargo ship ran aground on the west coast of Mutton Island, County Galway. She was refloated on 2 June.

=== 18 May ===
List of shipwrecks: 18 May 1920
Ship	State	Description
HSwMS Laxen	Swedish Navy	The submarine sank at Karlskrona, Sweden.

=== 21 May ===
List of shipwrecks: 21 May 1920
Ship	State	Description
Lester	United States	The sternwheel paddle steamer was lost at Fairbanks, Territory of Alaska.

=== 22 May ===
List of shipwrecks: 22 May 1920
Ship	State	Description
Cordora	United Kingdom	The passenger ship caught fire in the Indian Ocean off Socotra and was abandoned. Her crew were rescued by Umtata (United Kingdom).
Manoussis	Greece	The cargo ship ran aground on the Carromeiro Rocks, off Corcubión, A Coruña, Spain and was a total loss.
Tafna	United Kingdom	The cargo ship ran aground in the Tunas Channel, Cuba. She was refloated on 26 May.

=== 23 May ===
List of shipwrecks: 23 May 1920
Ship	State	Description
Lurcher	United Kingdom	The cargo liner ran aground 2 nautical miles (3.7 km) south Portpatrick, Wigtownshire. All 53 passengers were taken off.
Mina	(Soviet Union) Red Movement	Polish-Soviet War: The minesweeper was sunk on the Pripyat River at Pripyat by mines.

=== 24 May ===
List of shipwrecks: 24 May 1920
Ship	State	Description
John W. Wood	United Kingdom	The schooner was rammed and sunk in the Atlantic Ocean by Lake Elsah (United States). Her crew were rescued.
Wasa	United Kingdom	The cargo ship caught fire off Colonsay, Inner Hebrides and was a total loss. Four of her crew were killed.

=== 25 May ===
List of shipwrecks: 25 May 1920
Ship	State	Description
Albertus	Germany	The cargo ship came ashore at Hustadvika, Norway and was a total loss.
Equity	United Kingdom	The cargo ship ran aground in fog on Alderney, Channel Islands carrying a cargo of potatoes from Jersey. She was refloated on 15 June.
Leota	United States	The 36-gross register ton steamer was crushed by ice during the spring ice breakup while laid up on the bank of a river for the winter of 1919–1920 near Fairbanks, Territory of Alaska.
USFS Osprey	United States Bureau of Fisheries	While beached at Cordova, Territory of Alaska, to have her hull cleaned and copper painted, the fishery patrol vessel settled into the gravel on the beach, rolled away from the shore onto her side, filled with water, and became partially submerged. She was refloated and returned to service.

=== 26 May ===
List of shipwrecks: 26 May 1920
Ship	State	Description
Fau Sang	United Kingdom	The cargo ship ran aground off the Hainan Head Lighthouse, China. She later broke her back and was declared a total loss on 3 June.

=== 27 May ===
List of shipwrecks: 27 May 1920
Ship	State	Description
Deva	United States	The cargo ship caught fire at Faial Island, Azores, Portugal and was beached.
Dunleith	United Kingdom	The cargo ship ran aground at Proudfoot, Caithness. Her crew were rescued. She was refloated on 2 June.

=== 29 May ===
List of shipwrecks: 29 May 1920
Ship	State	Description
Cypress	United States	The 33-gross register ton fishing vessel was wrecked on a shoal in Dry Bay on the south-central or southeast coast of the Territory of Alaska. Her crew of four survived. The wreck report does not specify in which of several bays of the name the loss took place. Her gasoline engine was salvaged.

=== Unknown date ===
List of shipwrecks: Unknown date May 1920
Ship	State	Description
Prarial	United Kingdom	The cargo ship ran aground at Melilla, Spain in early May. She was refloated at the end of the month.
Selma	United States	The concrete hull tanker ran aground on the breakwater at Tampico, Mexico and was holed. She was towed to Galveston, Texas arriving on 21 May. Probably sank shortly after. Refloated 9 March 1922.
Oceaan IV	Netherlands	The 120.1-foot (36.6 m) trawler was last seen on the North Sea fishing grounds on 30 May and not seen again.

== June ==
=== 1 June ===
List of shipwrecks: 1 June 1920
Ship	State	Description
Little Florence	United Kingdom	The sailing ship foundered in the English Channel off Paimpol, Côtes-du-Nord, France.

=== 3 June ===
List of shipwrecks: 3 June 1920
Ship	State	Description
Samos	Greece	The cargo ship ran aground at Pointe Fern, Ouessant, Finistère, France. She broke in two on 11 June and was a total loss.

=== 7 June ===
List of shipwrecks: 7 June 1920
Ship	State	Description
Britannia	United Kingdom	The barque foundered in the North Sea 125 nautical miles (232 km) east by north of Spurn Point, Yorkshire with the loss of a crew member. Survivors were rescued by the trawler Dragon (United Kingdom).
Irmgard	United States	The schooner was wrecked at Suva, Fiji.
Pak Ling	United Kingdom	The cargo ship ran aground on Button Island, East China Sea. She was refloated on 15 June.

=== 8 June ===
List of shipwrecks: 8 June 1920
Ship	State	Description
Berwyn	United States	The cargo ship struck rocks off Sharbithat, Oman (17°50′N 57°22′E): She refloated but consequently foundered. Her 54 crew were rescued by Katiagallus (flag unknown).

=== 11 June ===
List of shipwrecks: 11 June 1920
Ship	State	Description
USS Eagle 25	United States Navy	The Eagle-class submarine chaser capsized and sank in a storm in the Delaware River off Finn's Point Light, 3 miles (4.8 km) south of New Castle, Delaware. Nine crewmen were killed. Over 45 survivors were rescued by Thomas Clyde and Independence Hall (flags unknown).
St. Boswells	United Kingdom	The tug struck a mine and sank in the North Sea off Terschelling, Netherlands with the loss of 16 of her 22 crew. Santa Theresa (Germany) rescued survivors.
USS SC-282	United States Navy	The SC-1-class submarine chaser sank in the Pacific Ocean off Mexico.

=== 14 June ===
List of shipwrecks: 14 June 1920
Ship	State	Description
Arkley	United Kingdom	The auxiliary sailing vessel ran aground on the Sow and Pig Sands, in the North Sea off Blyth, Northumberland. She was abandoned by her crew, but was later boarded by some of the crew of the Blyth Lifeboat. Arkley was refloated and brought into Blyth Harbour.

=== 15 June ===
List of shipwrecks: 15 June 1920
Ship	State	Description
Anna	Soviet Union	The cargo ship was destroyed by fire in the Skagerrak off Kristiansand, Norway.
Gladys	United Kingdom	The Thames barge collided with Chifuku Maru (Japan) in the Thames Estuary off the Mucking Lightship ( Trinity House) and sank. Her crew were rescued. Gladys was later refloated.
Pacifico	United States	The cargo ship was destroyed by fire in the Atlantic Ocean off Rio Grande do Sul, Brazil.
Pauline M. Cummins	United States	The schooner ran aground on the Hogsty Reef, Barbados and was a total loss. Her crew survived.
Robert Forest	United Kingdom	The tug sprang a leak in the North Sea and was beached off Grimsby, Lincolnshire. Her crew were rescued by the Spurn Lifeboat.

=== 16 June ===
List of shipwrecks: 16 June 1920
Ship	State	Description
Campos	Brazil	The cargo ship struck rocks in Victoria Girazill Bay and was beached at Rio de Janeiro.
F. R. Hazard	United States	The cargo ship collided with another vessel in Whitefish Bay and was consequently beached at Whitefish Point.

=== 17 June ===
List of shipwrecks: 17 June 1920
Ship	State	Description
Lady Thea	(Russian Empire) White Movement	Russian Civil War: The tanker caught fire at Batumi while loading kerosene and was scuttled by shelling by HMS Swallow (Royal Navy).

=== 18 June ===
List of shipwrecks: 18 June 1920
Ship	State	Description
Engineer	United Kingdom	The cargo ship caught fire at Lourenço Marques, Mozambique and was severely damaged. She sank on 20 June.
Wico	United States	The cargo ship ran aground in the Rabbit Islands, Turkey. She was refloated on 24 June.

=== 19 June ===
List of shipwrecks: 19 June 1920
Ship	State	Description
Heroine	United States	The 136-foot (41 m), 296-gross register ton fishing vessel sprang a leak and sank without loss of life in 80 feet (24 m) of water off Watch Hill, Rhode Island.

=== 20 June ===
List of shipwrecks: 20 June 1920
Ship	State	Description
Frontera	Norway	The cargo ship caught fire in the Atlantic Ocean off the coast of Cuba and was abandoned. She was later towed into Gibara.

=== 21 June ===
List of shipwrecks: 21 June 1920
Ship	State	Description
William C. May	United States	The schooner sprang a leak in the Atlantic Ocean and was abandoned. Her crew were rescued.

=== 26 June ===
List of shipwrecks: 26 June 1920
Ship	State	Description
Ansaldo San Giorgio III	Italy	The cargo ship caught fire and sank at Cartagena, Murcia, Spain.

=== 28 June ===
List of shipwrecks: 28 June 1920
Ship	State	Description
Charles E. Moody	United States	The 2,003-gross register ton, 233.9-foot (71.3 m) wooden ship was destroyed by fire while anchored in the roadstead at Naknek, Territory of Alaska. The only person aboard survived.

=== 29 June ===
List of shipwrecks: 29 June 1920
Ship	State	Description
Gladys and Nellie	United Kingdom	The schooner was destroyed by fire at Antilla, Cuba.
Independent	United States	The 17-gross register ton motor vessel was wrecked on the eastern spit at the entrance to Dry Bay – most likely the body of water of that name located at 59°08′N 138°25′W – on the south-central coast of the Territory of Alaska after her gasoline engine broke down and her anchors failed to hold in strong currents.
Koyo Maru	Japan	The cargo ship ran aground on the Serrana Bank, Columbia. She was refloated on 1 August.

== July ==
=== 2 July ===
List of shipwrecks: 2 July 1920
Ship	State	Description
Grayson	United States	The cargo ship ran aground on Stroma, Caithness, United Kingdom. She was declared a total loss on 7 July.

=== 3 July ===
List of shipwrecks: 3 July 1920
Ship	State	Description
Chas E. Moody	United States	The ship was destroyed by fire in Bristol Bay.

=== 4 July ===
List of shipwrecks: 4 July 1920
Ship	State	Description
Metkiy	(Soviet Union) Red Movement	Polish-Soviet War: Battle of Loyev: The paddle gunboat was wrecked at Loyev with its paddle wheels broken. The ship was abandoned and later shelled by Polish artillery.

=== 6 July ===
List of shipwrecks: 6 July 1920
Ship	State	Description
Standard #1	United States	While anchored in Norton Sound off the Bering Sea coast of the Territory of Alaska 0.5 nautical miles (0.93 km; 0.58 mi) south of the Egavik River (64°02′N 160°55′W) with no people or cargo aboard, the 15-gross register ton scow was blown ashore by a sudden storm and broke up in the surf without loss of life.

=== 7 July ===
List of shipwrecks: 7 July 1920
Ship	State	Description
West Nosska	United States	The Design 1013 cargo ship ran aground at Baltimore, Maryland. She was refloated on 12 July.

=== 9 July ===
List of shipwrecks: 9 July 1920
Ship	State	Description
Primrose	United Kingdom	The skiff was driven ashore at Oxwich Point, Glamorgan with the loss of the only crew member on board.

=== 12 July ===
List of shipwrecks: 12 July 1920
Ship	State	Description
Fort de Troyon	France	The cargo ship ran aground at Rio Grande, Brazil. She was refloated on 16 July.
Lake Frampton	United States	The cargo ship collided with Comus (United States) off Atlantic City and sank with the loss of two of her crew.

=== 19 July ===
List of shipwrecks: 19 July 1920
Ship	State	Description
Caroline	France	The barque caught fite at Antofagasta, Chile and was beached.
Coastwise	United States	The 109-foot (33.2 m), 269-gross register ton tug sprang a leak and sank in the North Atlantic Ocean south of Long Island, New York. Her entire crew of 17 survived.

=== 20 July ===
List of shipwrecks: 20 July 1920
Ship	State	Description
Jan	Netherlands	The tug foundered off Wenchow, China in a typhoon.
Shanghai	Netherlands	The dredger foundered off Wenchow in a typhoon.

=== 21 July ===
List of shipwrecks: 21 July 1920
Ship	State	Description
Carlo Alberto Racchia	Regia Marina	Allied intervention in the Russian Civil War: The Mirabello-class scout cruiser sank in the Black Sea after striking a mine off Odesa, Ukraine.
Saint Michael #9	United States	Loaded with a cargo of 406 tons of fuel oil in tanks, the 366-ton barge sank at the dock at St. Michael, Territory of Alaska, when a gale struck and heavy seas swamped her. She was a total loss.

=== 22 July ===
List of shipwrecks: 22 July 1920
Ship	State	Description
Kolyma	United States	The 29-gross register ton motor vessel was wrecked on the northwest coast of Sledge Island in the Bering Sea during a gale. Her crew of two survived.
Sesnon #5	United States	While anchored about 0.25 nautical miles (0.46 km; 0.29 mi) west of the mouth of the Lost River (65°23′N 167°09′W) on the Bering Sea coast of the Territory of Alaska with no cargo or crew aboard, the 58-ton scow dragged her anchor during a gale, was driven ashore, and was wrecked.

=== 25 July ===
List of shipwrecks: 25 July 1920
Ship	State	Description
HMCS CD88	Royal Canadian Navy	The Admiralty-type drifter foundered on passage from Canada to the United Kingdom.

=== 26 July ===
List of shipwrecks: 26 July 1920
Ship	State	Description
Mayals	United Kingdom	The coaster ran aground at Bideford, Devon. Her crew were rescued.
Stanton	United Kingdom	The cargo ship collided with Redriff (United Kingdom) in the Thames Estuary and sank. Her crew were rescued.

=== 27 July ===
List of shipwrecks: 27 July 1920
Ship	State	Description
Santa Elena	United States	The cargo ship was destroyed by fire at Valparaíso, Chile.

=== 28 July ===
List of shipwrecks: 28 July 1920
Ship	State	Description
Niki	Greece	The cargo ship arrived at Liverpool, Lancashire, United Kingdom leaking. She was beached at Tranmere, Cheshire.

=== 31 July ===
List of shipwrecks: 31 July 1920
Ship	State	Description
Santiago de Cuba	Cuba	The cargo ship was destroyed by fire after an explosion in one of her fuel tanks at Santiago de Cuba. One crewman killed, 2 badly burned.

=== Unknown date ===
List of shipwrecks: Unknown date July 1920
Ship	State	Description
Latham	United States	The concrete hull tanker ran aground at Tampico, Mexico. Refloated, repaired and taken to New Orleans where she was laid up. She was eventually sunk as a breakwater at Frontera, Mexico at an unknown date.
Suki Maru	Japan	The cargo ship ran aground at Cooktown, Queensland, Australia, in late July. She was refloated on 9 August.
Tinea	United States	The motor vessel was lost in Cook Inlet in the Territory of Alaska.

== August ==
=== 1 August ===
List of shipwrecks: 1 August 1920
Ship	State	Description
Emanuel Repoulis	Greece	The cargo ship departed Salonica for Beirut, Greater Lebanon. No further trace, presumed foundered in the Mediterranean Sea with the loss of all hands.

=== 3 August ===
List of shipwrecks: 3 August 1920
Ship	State	Description
Bitche	France	The cargo ship caught fire in the Mediterranean Sea off Cape Tiñoso, Spain and was abandoned.

=== 4 August ===
List of shipwrecks: 4 August 1920
Ship	State	Description
Gjoa	United States	With nine members of her crew ashore and only her captain on board, the 20-gross register ton motor vessel was wrecked without loss of life on the south-central coast of the Territory of Alaska 34 nautical miles (63 km; 39 mi) east of Cape Suckling (59°59′30″N 143°19′00″W) after her anchor cable parted during a storm.
H. C. Grube	Denmark	The schooner was driven ashore at Casablanca, French Morocco and was wrecked.

=== 5 August ===
List of shipwrecks: 5 August 1920
Ship	State	Description
Adramantis	Greece	The cargo ship sank in the Ionian Sea off Cerigo.
Santiago de Cuba	Cuba	The cargo ship was destroyed by fire.

=== 6 August ===
List of shipwrecks: 6 August 1920
Ship	State	Description
Pride of the West	United Kingdom	The schooner was driven ashore at Westkapelle, Netherlands. She broke up and was a total loss. Her crew were rescued.
West Eldara	United States	The Design 1013 cargo ship ran aground at Barier Point, Oahu, Hawaii. She was refloated on 10 August.

=== 12 August ===
List of shipwrecks: 12 August 1920
Ship	State	Description
Matra	United Kingdom	The cargo ship ran aground on the Curlew Reef, off Port Augusta, South Australia. She was refloated on 17 August.
Norman	United Kingdom	The steam whaler foundered off the Aliwal Shoal with the loss of all hands.

=== 14 August ===
List of shipwrecks: 14 August 1920
Ship	State	Description
A.S.310		The tug, under tow of tug H.S.83 from Calais, foundered in the English Channel off the East Goodwin Lightship ( Trinity House). Her crew were rescued.
Alma	(Russian Empire) White Movement	Russian Civil War: The transport was sunk in the Sea of Azov off Primorsko-Akhtorsk by mines.
Smolensk	(Russian Empire) White Movement	Russian Civil War: The cargo ship was sunk in the Sea of Azov off Primorsko-Akhtorsk by mines.

=== 15 August ===
List of shipwrecks: 15 August 1920
Ship	State	Description
Dorcas		The Thames barge was destroyed by fire in the River Thames at Woolwich, London with the loss of one of her three crew.
Snug Harbor	United States	During a voyage from Baltimore, Maryland, to Portland, Maine, the cargo ship sank in 60 feet (18 m) of water in the Atlantic Ocean 4.5 nautical miles (8.3 km; 5.2 mi) east by north of Montauk Point Light on Montauk Point, Long Island, New York, after colliding with the barge Pottsville (United States), which was under tow by Covington (United States). Snug Harbor was declared a total loss.

=== 16 August ===
List of shipwrecks: 16 August 1920
Ship	State	Description
Seresia	Belgium	The cargo ship collided with Eglantier (Belgium) at Antwerp and was beached. She was refloated on 18 August.

=== 17 August ===
List of shipwrecks: 17 August 1920
Ship	State	Description
Fife	United Kingdom	The cargo ship ran aground at Kaskinen, Finland. She was refloated on 24 August.

=== 18 August ===
List of shipwrecks: 18 August 1920
Ship	State	Description
James H. Shrigley	Canada	The cargo ship was wrecked/beached or foundered one-half mile (0.80 km) off Braddock Point Light, Lake Ontario. She was stripped and abandoned. The crew were rescued by the United States Coast Guard.
Ponrabbel II	United Kingdom	The dredger was reported to have gone ashore near São Martinho do Porto, Portugal. She was refloated by 27 August.

=== 19 August ===
List of shipwrecks: 19 August 1920
Ship	State	Description
Volga	White Movement	Russian Civil War: The transport was sunk in the Sea of Azov off Akhtar by naval mines.
Zharkyi	Russian Navy White Movement	Russian Civil War: The torpedo boat was sunk in the Sea of Azov off Primorsko-Akhtorsk by naval mines.

=== 20 August ===
List of shipwrecks: 20 August 1920
Ship	State	Description
Superior City	United States	The cargo ship collided with Willis L. King (United States) in Whitefish Bay, Lake Superior and sank with the loss of 29 of her 33 crew. The boiler exploded as the vessel sank.

=== 21 August ===
List of shipwrecks: 21 August 1920
Ship	State	Description
Hammonia	flag unknown	The ship struck a submerged wreck in the Baltic Sea off Fehmarn, Schleswig-Holstein, Germany and sank.
Panos	Greece	The cargo ship foundered in the Bay of Biscay 55 nautical miles (102 km) off Bilbao, Biscay, Spain.

=== 23 August ===
List of shipwrecks: 23 August 1920
Ship	State	Description
Haaber	Denmark	The schooner was wrecked at Hyrdalsand, Iceland with some loss of life.
Hebe	Denmark	The schooner foundered off Keflavík, Iceland.
Old Point Comfort	United States	The cargo ship was destroyed by fire at Baltimore, Maryland.

=== 25 August ===
List of shipwrecks: 25 August 1920
Ship	State	Description
Sea Breeze	United States	The 8-gross register ton, 35-foot (11 m) fishing vessel was destroyed by fire at Yasha Island (56°57′59″N 134°33′37″W) in Sumner Strait in the Alexander Archipelago in Southeast Alaska. Two of her three crewmen were killed.

=== 26 August ===
List of shipwrecks: 26 August 1920
Ship	State	Description
Electra	Netherlands	The schooner was driven ashore on Trinidad and was wrecked.
Friend Ship	United States	The schooner collided with a scow she was towing in the Atlantic Ocean off Hoffman Island, New York and was beached.
J. A. McKee	United Kingdom	The cargo ship ran aground in the Saint Lawrence River at Saguenay, Quebec, Canada. She was refloated on 29 August.
Lady C	United Kingdom	The schooner foundered in Placentia Bay. Her crew were rescued.

=== 27 August ===
List of shipwrecks: 27 August 1920
Ship	State	Description
HMCS CD93	Royal Canadian Navy	The Admiralty-type drifter foundered on passage from Canada to the United Kingdom.

=== 29 August ===
List of shipwrecks: 29 August 1920
Ship	State	Description
Anthracite Bridge	United States	The cargo ship ran aground at Nazik Point, Salonica, Greece. She was refloated on 28 September.

=== 30 August ===
List of shipwrecks: 30 August 1920
Ship	State	Description
Arakan	United Kingdom	The cargo ship ran aground at Point Reyes, California and was abandoned by her crew. She was refloated on 2 September.
Carmenchu	Spain	The cargo ship foundered in the Atlantic Ocean off Rosinos de la Requejada, Zamora.
Hickleton	United Kingdom	The cargo ship ran aground at Gurnard's Head, Cornwall. She later refloated but sank and was a total loss. Her thirteen crew survived.
Lisette	France	The schooner foundered in the Atlantic Ocean off Cape Pine, Newfoundland with the loss of a crew member.

=== Unknown date ===
List of shipwrecks: Unknown date August 1920
Ship	State	Description
Dagny	Denmark	The ship foundered in pack ice off Shannon Island, Greenland. Her crew survived, but a number of them died before they were rescued in September 1921.
John H. Dwight	United States	The 221-gross register ton barge was wrecked on rocks during a gale at St. Michael, Territory of Alaska. The only person aboard survived.
Kamui Maru	Japan	The cargo ship ran aground on Formosa in early August. She was declared a total loss on 12 September.

== September ==
=== 1 September ===
List of shipwrecks: 1 September 1920
Ship	State	Description
Myron C. Taylor	United States	The three-masted schooner was destroyed by fire at Cádiz, Spain.
USS S-5	United States Navy	July 2001 sonar image of the wreck of S-5 The S-class submarine partially flooded due to a jammed valve in the Atlantic Ocean 40 miles (64 km) off the Delaware Capes with her stern above water. All crew were rescued on 3 September. S-5 sank completely during an attempt to tow her to port on 3 September, 15 miles (24 km) off the Delaware Capes.

=== 2 September ===
List of shipwrecks: 2 September 1920
Ship	State	Description
Gjede	Norway	The cargo ship sprang a leak in the North Sea (57°20′N 5°10′E) and was abandoned. Her crew were rescued by a British trawler.
Red Dawn	Russian Navy Bolshevik	Russian Civil War: The warship was sunk by an onboard explosion with the loss of 130 lives.
Stavros	Greece	The cargo ship sprang a leak and sank in the English Channel. All nine crew were rescued by Marshal Plumer (United Kingdom).

=== 3 September ===
List of shipwrecks: 3 September 1920
Ship	State	Description
Cristóba Cólon	Spain	The ocean liner was severely damaged by fire at Ferrol, Galicia whilst under construction.
Genyei Maru	Japan	The cargo ship foundered in the South China Sea north of Formosa in a typhoon.
George Fisher	United Kingdom	The cargo ship sank on the Middle Cross Sand, North Sea. Her crew were rescued by Lucient (United Kingdom and the Caister Lifeboat. She was a total loss.
Katalla Queen	United States	The 7-gross register ton motor vessel sank in deep water near the middle of Valdez Bay (61°07′N 146°16′W) on the south-central coast of the Territory of Alaska during an attempt to tow her to shore after she struck piling head and began to flood. Her crew of two survived.

=== 5 September ===
List of shipwrecks: 5 September 1920
Ship	State	Description
Astarte	France	The cargo ship collided with Hird (Norway) in the Bay of Biscay 6 nautical miles (11 km) off Ouessant, Finistère and sank.
Dimitrios	Greece	The coaster foundered in the English Channel off Hartland Point, Devon, United Kingdom. All nine crew survived.

=== 6 September ===
List of shipwrecks: 6 September 1920
Ship	State	Description
Berwyn	United States	The cargo ship was wrecked at the Khuriya Muriya Islands in the Arabian Sea at approximately 17°44′N 056°38′E.
Norton	United Kingdom	The cargo ship ran aground off Zooria Island, Greece. She was refloated on 10 September.
Queenmead	United Kingdom	The cargo ship ran aground at Punta Entinas, Spain. She was refloated on 9 September.

=== 7 September ===
List of shipwrecks: 7 September 1920
Ship	State	Description
City of Omaha	United States	The cargo ship sank at Yokohama, Japan.

=== 8 September ===
List of shipwrecks: 8 September 1920
Ship	State	Description
Comboyne	Australia	The cargo ship sank at Port Kembla, New South Wales. She was later refloated, repaired and returned to service.

=== 9 September ===
List of shipwrecks: 9 September 1920
Ship	State	Description
Basaan	United States	The cargo ship sprang a leak. She was towed to Riverhead, Newfoundland by Portia (United Kingdom) and beached.
Loughborough	United Kingdom	The cargo ship collided with Konigin Luise (United Kingdom) in the Atlantic Ocean off Belém, Portugal and was beached.
Pentakota	United Kingdom	The cargo ship ran aground on the Gahha Reef. She was refloated on 30 September.
Siboney	United States	The passenger ship ran aground at Vigo, Galicia, Spain, due to an error in navigation by her captain. Her 500 passengers were taken off on 10 September. She was refloated on 30 September.
War Fundy	United Kingdom	The cargo ship ran aground in the Gulf of Bothnia off Grundkallen, Sweden and was a total loss. Her crew were rescued.

=== 10 September ===
List of shipwrecks: 10 September 1920
Ship	State	Description
USS Pittsburgh	United States Navy	The Pennsylvania-class cruiser ran aground in the Baltic Sea 3 nautical miles (5.6 km) off Liepāja, Latvia. She was refloated on 11 September.

=== 14 September ===
List of shipwrecks: 14 September 1920
Ship	State	Description
Fylla	Denmark	The schooner departed Campbellton, Newfoundland for Preston, Lancashire, United Kingdom. No further trace, presumed foundered in the Atlantic Ocean with the loss of all hands.
Mary L. Oxner	United Kingdom	The schooner ran aground on the Silver Bank, off the Turks Islands and was wrecked. Her crew were rescued.
Vermillion	United States	Under tow by the tug Barrelton (United States) from Norfolk, Virginia, to Fall River, Massachusetts, with a cargo of coal, the barge sank in the Atlantic Ocean 4.5 nautical miles (8.3 km; 5.2 mi) east by north of Montauk Point Light on Montauk Point, Long Island, New York, after colliding with the sunken wreck of the cargo ship Snug Harbor (United States). Vermillion and her cargo were declared a total loss.
Winstead	United States	Under tow by the tug Barrelton (United States) from Norfolk, Virginia, to Fall River, Massachusetts, with a cargo off coal, the barge sank in the Atlantic Ocean 4.5 nautical miles (8.3 km; 5.2 mi) east by north of Montauk Point Light on Montauk Point, Long Island, New York, after colliding with the sunken wreck of the cargo ship Snug Harbor (United States). Winstead and her cargo were declared a total loss.

=== 15 September ===
List of shipwrecks: 15 September 1920
Ship	State	Description
Charles A. Ritcey	Canada	The schooner was wrecked at Rose Head, Lunenburg, Nova Scotia with the loss of her captain.
Havfruen	Denmark	The cargo ship collided with United States (Denmark) in the Lessoe Channel. She was towed into Frederikshavn, Nordjylland, where she capsized with the loss of a crew member.
Salgyr	(Russian Empire) White Movement	Russian Civil War: Battle of Obytichnyi Spit: The gunboat was shelled and sunk in the Sea of Azov off Berdyansk by Krasnaya Zvezda (Soviet Navy). Two crewmen killed. Survivors were rescued by Ural ( (Russian Empire) White Movement).
Spyrios	Greece	The cargo ship sprang a leak and sank in the Atlantic Ocean off the Eddystone Lighthouse, Cornwall, United Kingdom. Her crew survived.

=== 17 September ===
List of shipwrecks: 17 September 1920
Ship	State	Description
Norse	United Kingdom	The 136.2-foot (41.5 m), 297-ton steam trawler ran aground on Patterson's rocks between Sanda Island and the Mull of Kintyre and was wrecked. A storm interrupted salvage operations on 27 September and by 3 October she had broke up and was below water.
Warita	United Kingdom	The coaster was severely damaged by fire at Fleetwood, Lancashire.

=== 19 September ===
List of shipwrecks: 19 September 1920
Ship	State	Description
Zelo	United Kingdom	The cargo ship struck the wreck of Merkur ( Finland) and sank in the Bristol Channel off Barry Island, Glamorgan with the loss of one of her 27 crew.

=== 20 September ===
List of shipwrecks: 20 September 1920
Ship	State	Description
Prince Rupert	Canada	The passenger ship struck a reef in Swanson Bay on the coast of British Columbia in Canada and was beached in a sinking condition. After her passengers and crew had been put ashore, she became almost completely submerged at high tide. She was refloated, repaired, and returned to service.

=== 22 September ===
List of shipwrecks: 22 September 1920
Ship	State	Description
Nea Ellas	Greece	The cargo ship ran aground on the Brazilian coast (5°11′S 35°10′W). She was refloated on 28 September.

=== 23 September ===
List of shipwrecks: 23 September 1920
Ship	State	Description
Amelia J.	Australia	The yacht was wrecked on Flinders Island, Tasmania with the loss of all hands. An Airco DH.9A aircraft of the Australian Air Corps was lost whilst searching for her, along with both crew. Amelia J. was on a voyage from Newcastle, New South Wales to Hobart, Tasmania.
I. D. S. Adolph	Denmark	The cargo ship ran aground on Middelgrunden. She was refloated on 28 September.

=== 24 September ===
List of shipwrecks: 24 September 1920
Ship	State	Description
USS Cushing	United States Navy	The decommissioned torpedo boat was sunk as a target.

=== 25 September ===
List of shipwrecks: 25 September 1920
Ship	State	Description
Annavore	United Kingdom	The cargo ship collided with España No.4 (Spain) and was consequently beached at Bonanza, province of Cádiz, Spain. She broke in two on 27 September.

=== 26 September ===
List of shipwrecks: 26 September 1920
Ship	State	Description
Eikhang	Norway	The cargo ship collided with Trostan (United Kingdom) in the Lessoe Channel and sank with the loss of three of her crew.

=== 27 September ===
List of shipwrecks: 27 September 1920
Ship	State	Description
Northland	United States	The schooner foundered in the Atlantic Ocean off Cape Henry, Virginia. She was later refloated in a severely leaking condition and beached.

=== 28 September ===
List of shipwrecks: 28 September 1920
Ship	State	Description
Fujinoki Maru No.2	Japan	The cargo ship ran aground in Tobashima Province. She broke up and was wrecked with the loss of two lives.

=== 29 September ===
List of shipwrecks: 29 September 1920
Ship	State	Description
Flandre	France	The cargo ship foundered in the English Channel off Saint-Brieuc, Côtes-du-Nord. Her crew survived.
Speedwell	United States	The cargo ship sank in the Gulf of Mexico during a hurricane. Everyone abandoned ship in her lifeboats, but eight died in the boats from exhaustion and privation.

=== 30 September ===
List of shipwrecks: 30 September 1920
Ship	State	Description
Katingo A. Lemos	Greece	The cargo ship foundered in the Atlantic Ocean 105 nautical miles (194 km) off Cape Finisterre, Spain.

=== Unknown date ===
List of shipwrecks: Unknown date September 1920
Ship	State	Description
Luella	United States	The sternwheel paddle steamer was lost at Chena, Territory of Alaska.
Meridian	United Kingdom	The ketch went aground on the Smalls Rocks off Pembrokeshire in dense fog on 13 September or 19 September 1920 or 1921. She was abandoned by her crew who were rescued by the trawler William Hanbury (United Kingdom) on either 14 or 20 September. She floated off the rocks and drifted nearly 100 kilometres (62 mi), crossing St. Georges Channel in two days and was driven ashore, about 3.2 kilometres (2 mi) north of Carnsore Point Ireland, on 15 or 21 September, becoming a total loss.
Southern Cross	United Kingdom	The brigantine was lost with all hands in Bass Strait, Australia.

== October ==
=== 1 October ===
List of shipwrecks: 1 October 1920
Ship	State	Description
Albyn	Finland	The barque departed Norfolk, Virginia, United States for Gothenburg, Sweden. No further trace, presumed foundered in the Atlantic Ocean with the loss of all hands.

=== 3 October ===
List of shipwrecks: 3 October 1920
Ship	State	Description
Akiska	United States	Akiska The yacht foundered and turned over on her side on the Brigantine Shoals at Atlantic City, New Jersey trying to make shelter in Absecon Inlet; her crew survived.
Yvonne	France	The barquentine ran aground at Plymouth, Devon, United Kingdom with the loss of a crew member. The survivors were rescued by a lifeboat.

=== 4 October ===
List of shipwrecks: 4 October 1920
Ship	State	Description
HMCS CD54	Royal Canadian Navy	The Admiralty-type drifter foundered on passage from Canada to the United Kingdom.
Montclair	United States	The cargo ship ran aground on Ellis Island, New York. She was refloated on 21 October.

=== 5 October ===
List of shipwrecks: 5 October 1920
Ship	State	Description
Cometa	Norway	The coaster came ashore at Desterro, Brazil and was wrecked.
Sorknes	Norway	The barque was dismasted and abandoned in the Atlantic Ocean. She was subsequently towed into Barry, Glamorgan, United Kingdom and was hulked.

=== 7 October ===
List of shipwrecks: 7 October 1920
Ship	State	Description
Elizabeth Alice	Belgium	The schooner foundered in the Bristol Channel. All six crew survived.

=== 8 October ===
List of shipwrecks: 8 October 1920
Ship	State	Description
Zuleika	United Kingdom	The cargo ship came ashore at Las Palmas, Canary Islands, Spain. She was declared a total loss on 11 November.

=== 9 October ===
List of shipwrecks: 9 October 1920
Ship	State	Description
Mars	Finland	The auxiliary schooner collided with Eston (United Kingdom) in the North Sea (54°12′N 0°08′W) and was abandoned.
Masnedsund	United Kingdom	The cargo ship came ashore at Bacton, Norfolk. She was driven further up the beach on 10 October and was abandoned by her crew.

=== 10 October ===
List of shipwrecks: 10 October 1920
Ship	State	Description
Benicia	United States	The barkentine ran aground on the Lafolle Reef off the coast of Haiti and was a total loss.
Svartskog	Norway	The barque departed Newport News, Virginia, United States for Buenos Aires, Argentina. No further trace, presumed foundered in the Atlantic Ocean with the loss of all hands.

=== 11 October ===
List of shipwrecks: 11 October 1920
Ship	State	Description
HMCS CD86	Royal Canadian Navy	The Admiralty-type drifter foundered on passage from Canada to the United Kingdom.
Dinorwic	United Kingdom	The cargo ship struck rocks off Lambay Island, County Dublin. She proceeded to Dublin but sank at her moorings there.
Esther Anne	United States	The four-masted schooner collided with Duquesne (United States) in the Atlantic Ocean off the coast of Pennsylvania and sank. Her crew were rescued.
Ella C. Hollett	United Kingdom	The schooner was abandoned in the Atlantic Ocean. She was discovered derelict and on fire at 44°33′N 17°33′W by St Catherine (United Kingdom).
Inverawe	United Kingdom	The cargo ship ran aground on the Haisborough Sands. She was refloated on 14 October.
Peder Wessel	Denmark	The three-masted schooner collided with Ravensworth (United Kingdom) in the English Channel off the Royal Sovereign Lightship ( Trinity House) and sank. Her crew were rescued.

=== 12 October ===
List of shipwrecks: 12 October 1920
Ship	State	Description
HMCS CD87	Royal Canadian Navy	The Admiralty-type drifter foundered on passage from Canada to the United Kingdom.

=== 13 October ===
List of shipwrecks: 13 October 1920
Ship	State	Description
Nikon	Greece	The cargo ship struck a mine and sank in the Baltic Sea and sank off Västervik, Sweden.
P. Heat	United States	The auxiliary schooner was sunk in a collision with Cayo Mambi (United States) at Santiago, Cuba. 12 killed.

=== 14 October ===
List of shipwrecks: 14 October 1920
Ship	State	Description
Santiago Arago	Spain	The schooner was destroyed by fire in the Mediterranean Sea off Almería. Her crew were rescued.

=== 18 October ===
List of shipwrecks: 18 October 1920
Ship	State	Description
Burnside	United States	The cargo ship caught fire in the Atlantic Ocean and was abandoned (49°22′N 4°32′W). Her crew were rescued by Goliath (United States). She later broke in two, with both sections remaining afloat and coming ashore on the Cornish coast. Later scrapped.

=== 20 October ===
List of shipwrecks: 20 October 1920
Ship	State	Description
Rose	United Kingdom	The Thames barge foundered in the Thames Estuary 1 nautical mile (1.9 km) off Slough Fort.

=== 21 October ===
List of shipwrecks: 21 October 1920
Ship	State	Description
Adonis	United Kingdom	The schooner came ashore on the east coast of the United States 300 nautical miles (560 km) from Jacksonville, Florida and was abandoned.
Chama	United Kingdom	The cargo ship ran aground on Bellechasse Island, Quebec, Canada. She was refloated on 25 October.
Georgie	France	The cargo ship came ashore at Quebec City, Canada. She was refloated on 11 November.
Nordica	United Kingdom	The schooner was abandoned in the Atlantic Ocean (43°53′N 51°28′W). Her crew were rescued by Willfaro (United States).

=== 22 October ===
List of shipwrecks: 22 October 1920
Ship	State	Description
Zaca	United States	The cargo ship caught fire at Port of Spain, Trinidad and was beached.

=== 23 October ===
List of shipwrecks: 23 October 1920
Ship	State	Description
Village Belle	United Kingdom	The cargo ship sprang a leak and was abandoned off Cape St. Mary's, Newfoundland.

=== 25 October ===
List of shipwrecks: 25 October 1920
Ship	State	Description
E. Hoel	Norway	The cargo ship collided with Grandlieu (France) in the Atlantic Ocean 40 nautical miles (74 km) off Vigo, Galicia, Spain and sank. Her crew were rescued.

=== 27 October ===
List of shipwrecks: 27 October 1920
Ship	State	Description
Bernard B. Conrad	United Kingdom	The schooner was abandoned in the Atlantic Ocean (45°50′N 38°54′W). Her crew were rescued by British Fern (United Kingdom).
Hastier	Belgium	Hastier The cargo ship arrived at Antwerp with a fire in her cargo. She sank on 3 November. Hastier was raised in 1921 and scrapped in 1922.

=== 28 October ===
List of shipwrecks: 28 October 1920
Ship	State	Description
USS Asher J. Hudson	United States Navy	The 92-foot (28 m), 136-ton harbor tug sank at dock at the New Orleans Navy Yard. One crewman was killed. The wreck was raised, renamed USS Yuma, but was sold commercial without returning to service with the U. S. Navy.
Minard Castle	United Kingdom	The cargo ship collided with Maple (United Kingdom) in the River Clyde and was beached at Dumbarton. She was refloated the next day.

=== 29 October ===
List of shipwrecks: 29 October 1920
Ship	State	Description
Sodegaura Maru	Japan	The cargo ship ran aground at Ninian, India. She was refloated on 8 November.

=== 30 October ===
List of shipwrecks: 30 October 1920
Ship	State	Description
Cape Fear	United States	The 266.5 foot concrete hulled cargo ship collided with City of Atlanta (United States) in Narragansett Bay and sank in 180 feet of water with the loss of 17 of her crew of 34.

=== 31 October ===
List of shipwrecks: 31 October 1920
Ship	State	Description
New York Maru	Japan	The cargo ship ran aground in the Red Sea off Mokha, Aden Protectorate. She was refloated on 17 November.

=== Unknown date ===
List of shipwrecks: Unknown date October 1920
Ship	State	Description
Ella C. Holley	United Kingdom	The schooner was abandoned in the Atlantic Ocean. Her crew were rescued by County of Cardigan (United Kingdom) and were landed at Bermuda on 1 November.
Gromoboi	Soviet Navy	The crew of the armoured cruiser mutinied and took over the ship off Kronstadt in late October. Commisars and officers were killed and the ship was scuttled. Later refloated and sold for scrap.

== November ==
=== 1 November ===
List of shipwrecks: 1 November 1920
Ship	State	Description
Coast Battleship Number 1	United States Navy	Coast Battleship Number 1, ex-USS Indiana, after sinking The decommissioned Indiana-class battleship (formerly USS Indiana) sank in shallow water in the Chesapeake Bay while in use as a target. Her wreck was sold for scrap.
Lothair	United Kingdom	The Thames barge was driven ashore at Felixstowe, Suffolk and was wrecked. Her crew were rescued by the Walton Lifeboat.
Posen	United Kingdom	The captured Nassau-class battleship (ex-Imperial German Navy) was driven ashore at Hawkcraig, Fife.

=== 2 November ===
List of shipwrecks: 2 November 1920
Ship	State	Description
Riberhuus	Germany	The cargo ship collided with Westwood (United States) at Saint-Nazaire, Loire-Inférieure, France and sank.
Thomas Lagnelet	France	The schooner foundered on this date. Her crew were rescued.

=== 4 November ===
List of shipwrecks: 4 November 1920
Ship	State	Description
Harvester	United States	The schooner departed Vavau, Tonga for San Francisco, California. No further trace, presumed foundered in the Pacific Ocean with the loss of all hands.
Les Aulnays	France	The cargo ship ran aground at Pointe du Touquet, Pas-de-Calais. She broke in two the next day and was a total loss.

=== 5 November ===
List of shipwrecks: 5 November 1920
Ship	State	Description
Guillane Ness	United Kingdom	The coaster was destroyed by fire in the North Sea off Montrose, Forfarshire. Her crew survived.
Loring R. Haskell	United Kingdom	The schooner foundered in White Bay. Her crew were rescued by Cactus (United Kingdom).

=== 6 November ===
List of shipwrecks: 6 November 1920
Ship	State	Description
Stella	Norway	The sail-powered cargo ship was driven ashore at Lyngvær, Norway, and was wrecked. Her crew were rescued.
HMS Stonehenge	Royal Navy	The destroyer was wrecked on the coast of the Ottoman Empire near Smyrna.

=== 7 November ===
List of shipwrecks: 7 November 1920
Ship	State	Description
Barbadoes	United Kingdom	The trawler struck a mine and sank in the North Sea with the loss of all ten crew.

=== 8 November ===
List of shipwrecks: 8 November 1920
Ship	State	Description
Cheechaco	United States	Stored for the winter on blocks high on the beach at Gambell on Saint Lawrence Island in the Bering Sea, the 9-ton schooner was destroyed during a gale when an unusually high tide floated her off the blocks and she drifted away and was dashed to pieces on rocks and the beach.

=== 9 November ===
List of shipwrecks: 9 November 1920
Ship	State	Description
Ulla	Sweden	The steamer struck a mine in the North Sea, and sank immediately. The crew survived.

=== 10 November ===
List of shipwrecks: 10 November 1920
Ship	State	Description
Baltabor	United Kingdom	The passenger ship ran aground at Liepāja, Latvia. All 152 passengers were taken off. She was refloated on 7 December.
Ella L. Williams	United Kingdom	The schooner caught fire in the Atlantic Ocean (approximately 19°N 67°W) and was abandoned.
El Mundo	United States	The tanker suffered an onboard explosion and caught fire at New York with the loss of a crew member. She was beached on Ellis Island. El Mundo was refloated on 20 November.

=== 11 November ===
List of shipwrecks: 11 November 1920
Ship	State	Description
Clan Graham	United Kingdom	The cargo ship collided with another vessel and was beached at Vlissingen, Netherlands. She was refloated on 21 November.
Ekstrand	Norway	The cargo ship foundered in the Skagerrak off Larvik, Norway.
Italian Prince	United Kingdom	The cargo ship was destroyed by fire at Limassol, Cyprus.
Lake Falk	United States	The cargo ship ran aground in the Paracel Islands. She was later refloated and arrived at Hong Kong on 23 November.
"Stella"	GermanyWeimar Republic	The abandoned Ketch was taken under tow by drifter "Feasible" (United Kingdom) off the North Hinder Lightship, but sank 4 hours later.

=== 12 November ===
List of shipwrecks: 12 November 1920
Ship	State	Description
Houthulst	Belgium	The schooner was wrecked off Smögen, Sweden.
HMS Tobago	Royal Navy	Russian Civil War, Allied Intervention: The destroyer struck a mine and in the Black Sea. She was deemed a constructive total loss.

=== 13 November ===
List of shipwrecks: 13 November 1920
Ship	State	Description
Baymanter	United Kingdom	The cargo ship came ashore at Ras Hafun, Italian Somaliland. She was declared a total loss on 7 December. Her crew were rescued.
Edith Pardy	United Kingdom	The schooner was driven ashore at Lamaline, Newfoundland and was a total loss.
J. A. Maclean	United Kingdom	The schooner was driven ashore at Englee, Newfoundland and was a total loss.

=== 14 November ===
List of shipwrecks: 14 November 1920
Ship	State	Description
Ferret	Australia	Ferret The cargo ship ran aground at Reef Head, Cape Spencer, South Australia and was wrecked. All 21 crew survived.

=== 15 November ===
List of shipwrecks: 15 November 1920
Ship	State	Description
HMS Amethyst	Royal Navy	The Topaze-class cruiser parted tow from Eagle and Margaret Ham (both United Kingdom) in the Irish Sea off the Smalls Lighthouse. Most of her crew were taken off by the Aberystwyth Lifeboat.
Maria José	Portugal	The schooner was driven ashore at Porthcawl, Glamorgan, United Kingdom with the loss of one of her six crew. Survivors were rescued by breeches buoy.
Nicholas	Greece	The cargo ship foundered in the Black Sea 5 nautical miles (9.3 km) off Cape Tuzla, Soviet Union. Her crew survived.
Pechiney	France	The auxiliary sailing ship caught fire and sank at Le Havre, Seine-Inférieure.
Sark	United Kingdom	The 98.1-foot (29.9 m), 145-ton steam trawler was wrecked south of Loch Eriboll.
T.30	Reichsmarine	The torpedo boat foundered at Cuxhaven, Germany.
Zhit	Soviet Navy	Russian Civil War, Evacuation of the Crimea: The destroyer foundered in the Black Sea with the loss of all on board - her crew and 250 passengers. She was on a voyage from Kertch to Constantinople, Ottoman Empire.

=== 16 November ===
List of shipwrecks: 16 November 1920
Ship	State	Description
Sarah Lightfoot	United Kingdom	The schooner was dismasted in the North Sea (55°22′N 0°16′W) and was abandoned in a sinking condition. Her crew were rescued by Bessheim (United Kingdom).
Sark	United Kingdom	The 98-foot (30 m) steam trawler fowled her prop with her net on 14 November in a westerly gale. She was towed to Loch Eriboll and anchored on 15 Nov. On 16 Nov. the gale swung to the northwest and drove her ashore. Her crew abandoned ship in her boat, the boat capsized before reaching shore, her skipper and fireman died. Abandoned as a Total Loss.
HMS Tyne	Royal Navy	The troopship sprang a leak and sank in the River Medway at Chatham, Kent.
Waltraute	United Kingdom	The depôt ship was driven ashore at Leith, Lothian. She was refloated on 28 November.
Zhivoi	(Russia) White Movement	Russian Civil War: The Boiki-class destroyer sank at Sevastopol during a storm.

=== 17 November ===
List of shipwrecks: 17 November 1920
Ship	State	Description
Delta	Norway	The barque ran aground north of Bergen, Norway and was severely damaged. She was towed to Hindö for examination with the expectation that she would be condemned as a constructive total loss.
Yute	Spain	The cargo ship issued an SOS in the Atlantic Ocean 240 nautical miles (440 km) south east of Cape May, Newfoundland. No further trace, presumed foundered with the loss of all hands.

=== 18 November ===
List of shipwrecks: 18 November 1920
Ship	State	Description
K.1	(Russia) White Movement	Russian Civil War: The river gunboat, a converted Bolinder-type landing barge, was scuttled.
Neptunus	Netherlands	The auxiliary schooner foundered in the Irish Sea 5 nautical miles (9.3 km) off the Smalls Lighthouse after her cargo shifted with the loss of one of her five crew. Survivors were rescued by the trawler Kirkland (United Kingdom).
Scarpa	United Kingdom	The vessel became stranded on the North Rock, Cloughey Bay, Country Down. She was raised on 23 February 1921, repaired and returned to service

=== 20 November ===
List of shipwrecks: 20 November 1920
Ship	State	Description
General Horne	United Kingdom	The schooner departed Catalina, Newfoundland for the Change Islands. No further trace, presumed foundered with the loss of all hands.
Grandest	United Kingdom	The coaster struck rocks off the Hanois Lighthouse, Guernsey, Channel Islands and sank. All twelve crew were rescued by a trawler.
Minnie Sommers	United Kingdom	The barquentine departed Bo'ness, Lothian for Cherbourg, Seine-Inférieure, France. No further trace, presumed foundered with the loss of all hands.

=== 21 November ===
List of shipwrecks: 21 November 1920
Ship	State	Description
Blenda	Sweden	The cargo ship struck a mine and sank in the Baltic Sea, en route from Finland to Hull. Her crew were rescued.

=== 22 November ===
List of shipwrecks: 22 November 1920
Ship	State	Description
Chausey	France	The cargo ship sank south of Belle Île, Morbihan.
Lizzie	United Kingdom	The cargo ship struck a rock and sank at Cherbourg, Seine Maritime, France.
Santa Rosa	Spain	The cargo ship sprang a leak and sank off Cape Prior, Galicia.

=== 23 November ===
List of shipwrecks: 23 November 1920
Ship	State	Description
Gregory	United Kingdom	The cargo ship ran aground at Tutóia, Brazil. She broke her back on 29 November and was a total loss.
Margaret F. Dick	United Kingdom	The schooner sprang a leak in the Atlantic Ocean (41°40′N 53°42′W. She was set afire and abandoned. Her crew were rescued by Leersum (Netherlands).

=== 24 November ===
List of shipwrecks: 24 November 1920
Ship	State	Description
Meduana	United Kingdom	The ocean liner caught fire and capsized at Wallsend, Northumberland.
Taunton	Norway	The cargo ship ran aground in the Bahamas. She was abandoned the next day and was a total loss.

=== 25 November ===
List of shipwrecks: 25 November 1920
Ship	State	Description
Cerealia	United Kingdom	The 122-foot (37 m), 220-ton steam trawler ran aground and was wrecked on Jager Rock, Sound of Islay, Jura, Scotland.
Zenith	United Kingdom	The barquentine foundered in the Atlantic Ocean four nautical miles (7.4 km) west of the Longships. All seven crew were rescued.

=== 26 November ===
List of shipwrecks: 26 November 1920
Ship	State	Description
W. J. Pirrie	United States	The schooner barge, with 18 people on board, wrecked on rocks in the Pacific Ocean off La Push, Washington after being cut loose from her tow by the steamer Santa Rita during a gale and heavy seas. W. J. Pirrie departed on 24 November from Tacoma, Washington, toward San Francisco, where she was to pick up additional cargo with a destination of Antofagasta, Chile. Only two of the 18 survived, and the ship's captain, his wife and baby son were among the lost.

=== 27 November ===
List of shipwrecks: 27 November 1920
Ship	State	Description
Comboyne	Australia	The cargo ship sank off Shellharbour, New South Wales. Her crew survived.
Erminie	France	The schooner was abandoned in the Bay of Biscay 3.5 nautical miles (6.5 km) north west of Ouessant, Finistère. Her crew were rescued by West Maximus (United States).
Evangelistria	Greece	The cargo ship foundered in the English Channel off the Casquets, Guernsey, Channel Islands. Her crew survived.

=== 28 November ===
List of shipwrecks: 28 November 1920
Ship	State	Description
Betsy	Netherlands	The schooner sprang a leak and sank in the North Sea. Her crew were rescued by the trawler Unity (United Kingdom).
Ioannis Carras	Greece	The cargo ship sank in the Iroise Sea off the Pierres Noires, Finistère, France. Her crew survived.

=== 29 November ===
List of shipwrecks: 29 November 1920
Ship	State	Description
Capitaine Remy	France	The auxiliary sailing vessel capsized in the English Channel 10 nautical miles (19 km) south of The Lizard, Cornwall, United Kingdom.
Meta	France	The schooner foundered off in the Mediterranean Sea off Port-la-Nouvelle, Aude.
Notre Dame de la Mer	France	The cargo ship capsized at Brunsbüttelkoog, Schleswig-Holstein, Germany.

=== 30 November ===
List of shipwrecks: 30 November 1920
Ship	State	Description
Sheila Margaret	United Kingdom	The cargo ship foundered in the English Channel. Wreckage from the ship washed up at Swanage, Dorset.

=== Unknown date ===
List of shipwrecks: Unknown date November 1920
Ship	State	Description
Rostislav	White forces	Russian Civil War: The minesweeper depot ship, a former Rostislav-class battleship, in use by White forces under Pyotr Wrangel, was scuttled in the Kerch Strait.

== December ==
=== 1 December ===
List of shipwrecks: 1 December 1920
Ship	State	Description
Betsy	Netherlands	The schooner sprang a leak in the North Sea and was abandoned. Her crew were rescued.
Giant King	United Kingdom	The schooner ran aground on Ambergris Cay, Turks Islands. Her passengers and crew were rescued.

=== 2 December ===
List of shipwrecks: 2 December 1920
Ship	State	Description
Ansgir	United Kingdom	The cargo ship ran aground near Mousehole, Cornwall. Her crew of 45 were rescued.
Blanche H. King	United States	The schooner ran aground on the West Reef, Bahamas and was a total loss. Her crew survived.
Dauntless	Norway	The cargo ship struck a mine in the Baltic Sea off the Närs Lighthouse, Sweden. Her crew were rescued.
Eastern Tempest	United States	The cargo ship ran aground on the Bogskär, Finland and was abandoned by her crew. She was refloated on 7 December.
Fiorino	Norway	The barque departed Kristiansand, Norway for the Hampton Roads. No further trace, presumed foundered with the loss of all hands.
Hathor	Germany	The cargo ship ran aground on the Lethegus Ledge off the Isles of Scilly, United Kingdom and was wrecked. All 24 crew were rescued by the St. Mary's Lifeboat.
Kate	United Kingdom	The schooner issued an SOS off Holyhead, Anglesey. Her crew were taken off by the Holyhead Lifeboat.

=== 4 December ===
List of shipwrecks: 4 December 1920
Ship	State	Description
Hermina	Netherlands	The auxiliary schooner broke free from her mooring and was wrecked at Fishguard, Pembrokeshire, United Kingdom in a gale with the loss of one of her ten crew. Survivors were rescued by the Fishguard Lifeboat or by rocket apparatus.
Renvoyle	United Kingdom	The cargo ship was abandoned off Belle Île, Finistère, France. she subsequently sank.
Schoolcraft	United Kingdom	The cargo ship was destroyed by fire at Kingston, Ontario, Canada.
Timbo	United Kingdom	The coaster was driven ashore near Clynnog Fawr, Caernarfonshire with the loss of four of her eight crew. Five of the thirteen crew of the Rhoscolyn Lifeboat were lost attempting to rescue her crew before she came ashore.
Tourmaline	United Kingdom	The coal hulk was driven ashore 16 nautical miles (30 km) west of Thurso, Caithness and was a total loss. Her crew were rescued by rocket apparatus.

=== 5 December ===
List of shipwrecks: 5 December 1920
Ship	State	Description
Verena	Netherlands	The schooner was abandoned in the North Sea (55°50′N 0°30′E). Her crew were rescued by Haakon VII (Norway).

=== 6 December ===
List of shipwrecks: 6 December 1920
Ship	State	Description
Graf Waldersee	United Kingdom	The cargo ship collided with Tregantle (United Kingdom) in the River Thames at Gravesend, Kent. She then collided with Fairfield and the ice hulk Sumatra (both United Kingdom) and was then beached. Fairfield sank and the other ships were damaged. Graf Waldersee was refloated on 8 December.
Taff	United Kingdom	The cargo ship ran aground on the Dogger Bank in the North Sea and was a total loss.

=== 8 December ===
List of shipwrecks: 8 December 1920
Ship	State	Description
V140	Reichsmarine	The V125-class torpedo boat was wrecked on this date.

=== 10 December ===
List of shipwrecks: 10 December 1920
Ship	State	Description
Yellowstone	United States	The cargo ship dragged her anchor and ran hard aground off Ponta Delgada in the Azores and was declared a total loss. All 45 of her crew were saved.

=== 13 December ===
List of shipwrecks: 13 December 1920
Ship	State	Description
Mabel A	United States	After her gasoline engine broke down, the 32-ton fishing vessel drifted onto the coast of "Noise Island" – apparently Noyes Island – in the Alexander Archipelago in Southeast Alaska and was stranded, breaking up in the surf in about two hours. Her crew of three survived.
Nikolaos Stathatos	Greece	The cargo ship foundered in the Atlantic Ocean 40 nautical miles (74 km) off Cape Ortegal, Galicia, Spain. All 25 crew were rescued.

=== 15 December ===
List of shipwrecks: 15 December 1920
Ship	State	Description
Limehouse	United Kingdom	The cargo ship ran aground on the East Barrow Sands in the Thames Estuary. She was refloated on 21 December.

=== 16 December ===
List of shipwrecks: 16 December 1920
Ship	State	Description
Anna G. Lord	United States	The schooner was abandoned in the Atlantic Ocean off the coast of Maryland. Her crew were rescued.
Emma Belliveau	United Kingdom	The schooner foundered off Saint Michael, Barbados.
Inca	United States	The five-masted schooner was abandoned in the Pacific Ocean (approximately 34°S 154°E). Her crew were rescued by Cosmos (United Kingdom). She was towed into Sydney, New South Wales, Australia, arriving on 18 December.
Monnow	United Kingdom	The four-masted auxiliary schooner was destroyed by fire off Southend, Essex. All nineteen crew survived.
Perry Setzer	United States	The four-masted schooner was beached at Jacksonville, Florida.
St. Louis	United States	The ocean liner was severely damaged by fire at New York.
Yellowstone	United States	The cargo ship was driven ashore at Saint Michael, Barbados and was wrecked.

=== 17 December ===
List of shipwrecks: 17 December 1920
Ship	State	Description
Bar-le-Duc	French Navy	The despatch boat was wrecked off Euboea, Greece with the loss of 26 of her 105 crew.

=== 18 December ===
List of shipwrecks: 18 December 1920
Ship	State	Description
Elisabeth	Denmark	The schooner came ashore on the south coast of Iceland and was a total loss. Her crew were rescued.
Joseph Pulitzer	United States	During a mail voyage from Seward, Territory of Alaska, to the Aleutian Islands, the 73-gross register ton, 75-foot (22.9 m) two-masted motor schooner sank in Aniakchak Bay (56°42′N 157°22′W) on the south coast of the Alaska Peninsula. All eight people on board survived. Joseph Pulitzer's wreck later was salvaged, taken to Chignik, Territory of Alaska, and stripped.

=== 19 December ===
List of shipwrecks: 19 December 1920
Ship	State	Description
Jane Palmer	United States	The schooner was abandoned in the Atlantic Ocean (35°04′N 65°25′W). Her crew were rescued by Cotati (United States).

=== 20 December ===
List of shipwrecks: 20 December 1920
Ship	State	Description
Dora	United States	During a voyage from Seattle, Washington, to Unga, Territory of Alaska, and way ports with a cargo of general merchandise and a crew of 29 aboard, the 320-gross register ton steamer was wrecked without loss of life on the coast of Noble Island in British Columbia, Canada.
Spyros	Greece	The cargo ship foundered in the English Channel 11 nautical miles (20 km) south of St. Catherine's Point, Isle of Wight, United Kingdom. All eleven crew were rescued.

=== 21 December ===
List of shipwrecks: 21 December 1920
Ship	State	Description
Fredensborg	Denmark	The schooner was driven ashore 6 nautical miles (11 km) south of Johnshaven, Aberdeenshire, United Kingdom. Her crew were rescued by the Johnshaven Lifeboat, which later capsized with the loss of two of her crew and a lifeboatman.
Robert H. McCurdy	United States	The schooner foundered in the Atlantic Ocean.

=== 23 December ===
List of shipwrecks: 23 December 1920
Ship	State	Description
Curieuse	France	The schooner departed Fogo, Newfoundland for Alicante, Spain. No further trace, presumed foundered in the Atlantic Ocean with the loss of all hands.
Vlassios	Greece	The cargo ship foundered in the Aegean Sea off Leipsoi with the loss of six of her fifteen crew.

=== 25 December ===
List of shipwrecks: 25 December 1920
Ship	State	Description
Kwinana	United Kingdom	The cargo ship caught fire at Carnarvon, Western Australia and sank.
Ougree	Belgium	The cargo ship collided with Aleppo (United Kingdom) in the River Scheldt and was beached off Vlissingen, Netherlands.
Photios	Greece	The cargo ship sprang a leak, broke in two, and sank in the Mediterranean Sea between Corsica and Elba, Italy. Her crew were rescued by Calliroi Saparis (Greece).
Prah	United Kingdom	The cargo liner ran aground 5 nautical miles (9.3 km) east of Grand-Bassam, French West Africa. She was refloated on 3 January 1921.

=== 26 December ===
List of shipwrecks: 26 December 1920
Ship	State	Description
Navarino	United Kingdom	The cargo ship arrived at Queenstown, County Cork, United Kingdom on fire and was beached. She was refloated on 31 December.

=== 27 December ===
List of shipwrecks: 27 December 1920
Ship	State	Description
Elsie L. Corkum	United Kingdom	The schooner sprang a leak and was abandoned in the Atlantic Ocean (40°29′N 13°38′W). Her six crew were rescued by Heronspool (United Kingdom).
Lakeside Bridge	United States	The EFC Design 1023 cargo ship lost her propeller in strong gale and ran aground on Pico Island, Azores, Portugal and became a total loss.

=== 28 December ===
List of shipwrecks: 28 December 1920
Ship	State	Description
Impressive	United Kingdom	The schooner foundered off Memory Rock, Bahamas.
Tris Adelft	Greece	The cargo ship sank in the Tyrrhenian Sea 18 nautical miles (33 km) north west of Monte Circeo, Lazio, Italy. Her crew were rescued.

=== 29 December ===
List of shipwrecks: 29 December 1920
Ship	State	Description
John C. Craven	United States	The ocean liner Nieuw Amsterdam (Netherlands) rammed the lighter John C. Craven in New York Harbor, cutting her in two and sinking her. Two lightermen were killed; the skipper and five lightermen were rescued.
Korsnæs	Norway	The auxiliary schooner was destroyed by fire off Chesapeake, Virginia, United States.

=== 30 December ===
List of shipwrecks: 30 December 1920
Ship	State	Description
Saint Oran	United Kingdom	The cargo ship collided with Eveleen (United Kingdom) off Ailsa Craig, Ayrshire and sank. Twenty of her crew were rescued.

=== 31 December ===
List of shipwrecks: 31 December 1920
Ship	State	Description
Kentucky	Denmark	The cargo ship came ashore at Duncansby Head, Caithness, United Kingdom. Her crew were rescued.

=== Unknown date ===
List of shipwrecks: Unknown date December 1920
Ship	State	Description
Kaes Samud	Unknown	The ship sank off Bangkok, Thailand.
Marion J. Smith	United Kingdom	The schooner was abandoned in the Atlantic Ocean. Her crew was rescued by Pennyworth (United Kingdom) and landed at Tarragona, Spain, on 15 December.

== Unknown date ==
List of shipwrecks: Unknown date 1920
Ship	State	Description
BDL	United States	The motor vessel was lost in "Strawberry Bay" near Katalla, Territory of Alaska – probably a reference to Strawberry Harbor, also known as Strawberry Cove (60°10′N 144°23′W), 5 nautical miles (9.3 km) southeast of Katalla.
HMCS CD57	Royal Canadian Navy	The Admiralty-type drifter was lost at sea sometime before August 1920.
Gunner	United States	The whaling boat was lost in Prince William Sound on the south-central coast of the Territory of Alaska after her harpoon cannon exploded.
Imperial Queen	United Kingdom	The steam fishing trawler sailed from Grimsby on 22 July for the North Sea fishing grounds and was last seen on 28 July, apparently returning to Grimsby. Her crew of 11 were lost. It was supposed that she had struck a mine.
On Time	United States	The 27-gross register ton, 56.1-foot (17.1 m) motor cargo vessel was wrecked in Cook Inlet on the south-central coast of the Territory of Alaska. Her loss was not reported until 1928.
Outline	United States	The vessel was lost in Cook Inlet on the south-central coast of the Territory of Alaska.
USS Richmond	United States	The decommissioned frigate, sold for scrap, was burned on the beach at Eastport, Maine, sometime during the first half of 1920 to ease the retrieval of valuable metals.
UB-21	United Kingdom	The Type UB II submarine foundered off the coast of England whilst under tow to be scrapped.
Varyag	Royal Navy	The protected cruiser ran aground at Lendalfoot, Ayrshire whilst under tow to be scrapped. She sank in 1925.
