= Smolensk (disambiguation) =

Smolensk is a city in Russia.

Smolensk may also refer to:

- A former name of Livingston Island
- Smolensk Strait in the South Shetland Islands, Antarctica
- Smolensk air disaster, a 2010 plane crash
- Smolensk (film), about the plane crash
- Smolensk, former name of the football club SFC CRFSO Smolensk

Ships

- Soviet submarine K-410 "Smolensk"
- Soviet monitor Smolensk (1926-1941)
- SS Smolensk, a number of steamships named Smolensk

== See also ==
- Diocese of Smolensk (disambiguation)
- Smolensk Governorate
- Smolensk Oblast
- Smolensk Principality
- Smolensk Province
- Smolensk Upland
- Smolensk Voivodeship
