= SS Ceylan =

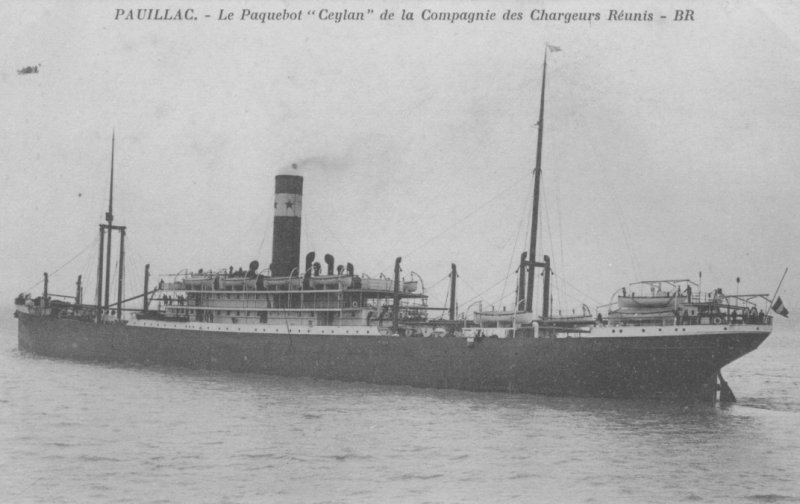

History
- Name: Ceylan
- Owner: Compagnie des Chargeurs Réunis
- Builder: Swan Hunter, Wallsend
- Yard number: 793
- Launched: 13 August 1907
- Completed: December 1907
- Home port: Le Havre
- Fate: Scrapped in 1934

General characteristics
- Type: passenger ship
- Tonnage: 8,214 gross register tons (GRT); 5,128 tons deadweight (DWT)
- Length: 483 ft (147 m)
- Beam: 56.6 ft (17.3 m)
- Depth: 33.4 ft (10.2 m)
- Installed power: 679 nhp
- Propulsion: 2 x triple expansion steam engines
- Speed: 14 knots (16 mph)

SS Ceylan was a passenger ship of the French shipping company Compagnie Maritime des Chargeurs Réunis, which entered service in 1907 and was scrapped in 1934. In January 1920 she rescued 34 survivors of the passenger ship SS Afrique, which had sunk in a storm in the Bay of Biscay.

== Construction ==
The 8223-ton steamship Ceylan was built at the Swan Hunter & Wigham Richardson shipyard in Wallsend, England for the French shipping company Compagnie Maritime des Chargeurs Réunis. Launched on 13 August 1907, she was completed in December that year. The 483 ft (147 m) long and 56.6 ft (17.3 m) wide passenger ship had a single funnel, two masts and two propellers. The top speed was 14 knots (16 mph).

== Service ==
On 11 January 1920 the Ceylan, under the command of Captain Juan, went to the assistance of the Afrique, which with 609 passengers and crew members on board, had run onto a reef in the Bay of Biscay. Because of the stormy seas the Ceylan could not approach the Afrique but was able to rescue two of her lifeboats, which together had 34 people in them. These 34 people, including four women, were the only survivors of the disaster. They were brought ashore by the Ceylan.

== Scrapping ==
The Ceylan, after 27 years' service, arrived at La Spezia Italy on 21 March 1934 to be scrapped.
