= SS Olockson =

Steam cargo ship

History

United States
- Name: Olockson
- Owner: USSB
- Operator: Pacific Steamship Co. (November 1919–January 1920); Barber Line (1920)
- Ordered: 8 January 1918
- Builder: Guy M. Standifer Construction Co., Vancouver
- Yard number: 6
- Laid down: 3 January 1919
- Launched: 11 September 1919
- Commissioned: 17 November 1919
- Maiden voyage: 6 December 1919
- Home port: Seattle
- Identification: US Official Number 219005; Call sign LTDJ
- Fate: Scrapped, 1924

General characteristics
- Type: Design 1015 cargo ship
- Tonnage: 6,076 GRT; 3,729 NRT; 9,419 DWT
- Length: 401.4 ft (122.3 m)
- Beam: 53.2 ft (16.2 m)
- Draft: 26 ft 6 3/16 in (8.082 m) (loaded)
- Depth: 31.9 ft (9.7 m)
- Installed power: 359 Nhp, 2,800 ihp
- Propulsion: Hooven, Owens & Rentschler 3-cylinder triple expansion
- Speed: 11 knots (13 mph; 20 km/h)

Olockson was a steam cargo ship built in 1918–1919 by Guy M. Standifer Construction Company of Vancouver for the United States Shipping Board as part of the wartime shipbuilding program of the Emergency Fleet Corporation (EFC) to restore the nation's Merchant Marine. In March 1920, only on her second voyage, the vessel caught fire and had to be abandoned by the crew. The ship was subsequently towed to Baltimore where she was broken up in 1924.

== Design and construction ==
After the United States entry into World War I, a large shipbuilding program was undertaken to restore and enhance shipping capabilities both of the United States and their Allies. As part of this program, EFC placed orders with nation's shipyards for a large number of vessels of standard designs. Design 1015 cargo ship was a standard cargo freighter of approximately 9,400 tons deadweight designed by Moore Shipbuilding Co. and adopted by USSB.

Olockson was part of the order for 10 vessels placed by USSB with Guy M. Standifer Construction Co. on 8 January 1918 and was laid down at the shipbuilder's yard on 3 January 1919 and launched on 11 September 1919 (yard number 6).

The ship had two main decks as well as forecastle and poop deck and was built on the Isherwood principle of longitudinal framing providing extra strength to the body of the vessel. The freighter had five main holds and also possessed all the modern machinery for quick loading and unloading of cargo from five large hatches, including ten winches and a large number of derricks. She was also equipped with wireless apparatus, had submarine signal system installed and had electrical lights installed along the decks.

As built, the ship was 401.4 feet (122.3 m) long (between perpendiculars) and 53.2 feet (16.2 m) abeam, a depth of 31.9 feet (9.7 m). Olockson was originally assessed at 6,076 GRT and 3,729 NRT and had deadweight of approximately 9,419. The vessel had a steel hull with double bottom throughout with exception of her machine compartment, and a single 2,800 ihp triple expansion steam engine, with cylinders of 24 1/2-inch (62 cm), 41 1/2-inch (105 cm) and 72-inch (180 cm) diameter with a 48-inch (120 cm) stroke, that drove a single screw propeller and moved the ship at up to 11 knots (13 mph; 20 km/h). The steam for the engine was supplied by three single-ended Scotch marine boilers fitted for both coal and oil fuel, with latter one being the main source.

== Operational history ==
While the steamer was still under construction she was allocated by the USSB to Pacific Steamship Company for Oriental service. However, with ever changing trade conditions, Olockson and another Shipping Board steamer, Wawalona, were later reassigned to carry a cargo of flour for the Atlantic Coast with further delivery to Europe. On 17 November 1919 the freighter finally moved from the builder's yard and was berthed at the municipal dock in preparation for loading. She then took on board a large cargo of flour for Europe and lumber for Panama Canal Zone discharged from damaged steamer Siletz which was scheduled to go into drydock for repairs. Following an established USSB policy the Shipping Board ship could only continue with cargo to Europe if an equivalent amount of cargo space would be allocated by a foreign shipping operator, so Olockson were to discharge her cargo in one of the East Coast ports. The cargo transfer was completed by December 3 and the steamer then proceeded to load additional cargo eventually departing Portland on December 6. After an uneventful journey Olockson arrived at Balboa on Christmas Day discharging 953 tons of lumber there and then continuing on to the ports in the Northeast with the remaining cargo consisting of 7,128 tons of flour. She reached Philadelphia on 10 January 1920 where she unloaded part of her cargo before continuing on to New York.

She returned to Philadelphia on February 3 after being chartered by Barber Line to transport cargo to the Far East. After taking on board 2,500 tons of steel rails and 1,594,100 gallons of gasoline in cases and drums she cleared from Philadelphia on March 2 bound for Japan and Japanese-occupied Vladivostok. The freighter reached Cristóbal in the afternoon of March 11, and exited from the Panama Canal into the Pacific at 18:58 on March 12. The ship was under command of captain Thomas Endreson and had a crew of forty five.

At approximately 06:10 on March 13 a fire was discovered by the first assistant engineer while Olockson was approximately 35 nautical miles (40 mi; 65 km) southwest by south off Punta Mala lighthouse and about 125 nautical miles (144 mi; 232 km) from Balboa in approximate position 7°12′N 80°20′W. The fire was well under way and the engineer could barely escape the quickly spreading flames. A wireless call for help was sent out and U.S. Navy cruiser Tacoma and tug Gorgona were dispatched to the ship's aid. Due to severity of the fire and considering the nature of the ship's cargo the captain ordered the crew to abandon ship. Several lifeboats were lowered and about half the crew of forty-five disembarked the burning vessel without any issues while the captain and the other half remained on board to try to fight off the fire. At about 9:00 some gasoline exploded in the aft hold tearing off the wireless house. A series of gasoline explosions followed forcing the rest of the crew to abandon the burning vessel by 11:00. The survivors were then picked up by steamer SS Salvador which responded to Olockson's call for help and was standing by. After picking up all the survivors, Salvador took course towards Balboa. In the afternoon of March 13 she encountered Tacoma and transferred all the survivors on board the cruiser. The tug reached the area in the morning of March 14 and took the burning freighter into tow bringing her to Balboa outer harbor by about 18:00 on March 17 where Olockson was immediately beached. Holes were cut in the steamer's hull while she was lying at low tide, and after arrival of high tide they were plugged by divers to ensure the water stays inside the burning holds. The fire was finally extinguished by approximately 17:30 on March 21. Olockson was then floated on April 19 and brought into inner harbor next day where she was berthed to unload any undamaged cargo. The unloading was finished by May 26 and in total all 2,500 tons of steel and 593,832 gallons of gasoline were salvaged from the burned vessel.

After examining the vessel USSB decided not to rebuild the ship but rather offered it for sale in "as is, where is" condition in September 1920. However, as no bids were received that matched USSB expected price of about US$100,000 the sale fell through and the ship remained moored in Balboa for the next several years. USSB continued offering the vessel for sale, for example they did so in June 1922. Olockson was eventually sold to the Boston Iron metal Company of Baltimore. In April 1923 the vessel was loaded with scrap iron at Balboa and towed 2,239 miles by collier Ulysses to Hampton Roads. She was then brought from there by tug Joseph D. Wood to Baltimore on 9 May 1923 and remained moored at the bottom of Fallsway for the next several months. The ship was eventually broken up and scrapped in February 1924.
