= SS West Aleta =

American cargo steamship

History

United States
- Name: West Aleta
- Owner: United States Shipping Board
- Builder: Western Pipe and Steel Company
- Launched: 15 March 1919
- Completed: 1919
- Out of service: 12 February 1920
- Fate: wrecked at Terschelling, the Netherland on 12 February 1919

General characteristics
- Type: Steamship
- Tonnage: 5720 GRT
- Length: 142 m (465 ft 11 in)
- Beam: 18 m (59 ft 1 in)
- Crew: 42

SS West Aleta was a 142 metre long American Design 1019 cargo steamship with home port San Francisco. She was built in 1919 by Western Pipe and Steel Company, and owned by United States Shipping Board. During a storm on her maiden voyage on 12 February 1920, the ship sank near Terschelling, the Netherlands. All 42 crew members were rescued. The salvage of the ship was difficult and took almost a year.

Several things on Terschelling were later named after the ship, including the business that sold a part of the wine barrels and a choir.

== Ship details ==
The 5720 GRT steel Design 1019 cargo ship was built in 1919 by Western Pipe and Steel Company in San Francisco and owned by the United States Shipping Board. She was 124 metres (406 ft 10 in) long and had a width of 16 m (52 ft 6 in). She was propulsed by a General Electric steam turbine, had 4 boilers, a single shaft and one screw, and could reach a speed of 10.5 knots. She had yard number 8 and Official number: 218556.

== Fate ==
During her maiden voyage in early 1920, the ship was en route from Seattle, United States to Hamburg and Bremen in Germany with a cargo of 35,000 barrels of wine and whiskey, bales of rice, boxes of herring, pine beams, spirits and other general cargo. The ship had many European old wines onboard (among others Bordeaux, Bourgogne). Due to the Prohibition, these drinks were banned in the United States and therefore shipped back to Europe.

During a storm on 12 February 1920, she got stranded near Terschelling, the Netherlands. The ship Brandaris of the Terschelling Rescue Committee went to the ship. With great difficulty, she was able to get the 42 crew members off the ship. Shortly after, the ship broke into two pieces.

In February 1928, next to the wreck of West Aleta another ship from Urk sank. All three people probably drowned.

== Salvage ==
The recovery of the cargo from the wreck was difficult and took almost a year. The salvage was carried out by “Nieuwe Bergingsmaatschappij” of Andries Dirkzwagwr from Maassluis, but eventually also vessels of local fishermen and of Rederij Doeksen helped. The last barrels were salvaged by divers. The salvage lasted until November 1920.

Many barrels washed up on Terschelling, but also on Vlieland and Ameland. Beachcombers drilled holes in the barrels to taste the wine. The favorites were taken home and others were left behind and emptied into nature. Of the 35,000 barrels, only 15,000 barrels have been officially reported as salvaged.

== Legacy ==
The officially registered barrels were later sold. Two companies were founded to sell the barrels: wine manufacturer Siebrand from Kampen and drink trader Jan Kooijman. Kooijman bought a part of the 35,000 barrels of wine and started a wine business in Harlingen. Later he moved his business to Terschelling and named it “West Aleta”. "West Aleta” is nowadays a subsidiary of Heineken.

A choir on Terschelling, founded in 1974, is named after this ship: the West Aleta Singers.
