= SS Lakeside Bridge =

Coordinates: 38°25′23.0″N 28°24′58.8″W

History

United States
- Name: Lakeside Bridge
- Namesake: Lakeside Bridge & Steel Co.
- Owner: USSB
- Operator: Alex. Sprunt & Sons (1920); Lykes Brothers (1920)
- Ordered: 16 November 1917
- Builder: Submarine Boat Company, Newark
- Cost: US$1,182,000
- Yard number: 83
- Laid down: 26 June 1919
- Launched: 31 October 1919
- Sponsored by: Miss Genevieve Coddington
- Completed: December 1919
- Maiden voyage: 13 January 1920
- In service: 22 December 1919
- Home port: Newark
- Identification: US Official number 219243; code letters LTRG
- Fate: Wrecked, 27 December 1920

General characteristics
- Type: Design 1023 ship
- Tonnage: 3,545 GRT; 2,174 NRT; 5,300 DWT
- Length: 324.0 ft (98.8 m)
- Beam: 46.2 ft (14.1 m)
- Draft: 22 ft 9 1/2 in (6.947 m) (loaded)
- Depth: 25.0 ft (7.6 m)
- Installed power: 1,500 ihp
- Propulsion: Westinghouse Electric steam turbine double reduction geared to one screw
- Speed: 10 1/2 knots (19.4 km/h)

Lakeside Bridge was a steam cargo ship built in 1919 by Submarine Boat Company of Newark for the United States Shipping Board (USSB) as part of the wartime shipbuilding program of the Emergency Fleet Corporation (EFC) to restore the nation's Merchant Marine. The vessel was chiefly employed on the East Coast and Gulf to Europe routes throughout her short career. In December 1920 the vessel went ashore in strong gale and was wrecked without loss of life.

== Design and construction ==
After the United States entry into World War I, a large shipbuilding program was undertaken to restore and enhance shipping capabilities both of the United States and their Allies. As part of this program, EFC placed orders with nation's shipyards for a large number of vessels of standard designs. Design 1023 cargo ship was a standard cargo freighter of approximately 5,300 tons deadweight designed by Submarine Boat Corp. and adopted by USSB.

Lakeside Bridge was part of the second optional order for 68 additional vessels placed by USSB with Submarine Boat Corp. on 16 November 1917. The ship was laid down at the shipbuilder's yard on 26 June 1919 (yard number 83) and launched on 31 October 1919, with nine-year old Miss Genevieve Coddington, granddaughter of Van Tyle William Coddington, president of the Lakeside Bridge & Steel Company of North Milwaukee, being the sponsor. The ship was named after the company, one of many providers of fabricated steel for the shipyard.

Similar to all vessels of this class the ship had one main deck and was built on the three-island principle. The freighter had her machinery situated amidships and had four main holds, both fore and aft, which allowed for the carriage of variety of goods and merchandise. The vessel also possessed all the modern machinery for quick loading and unloading of cargo from five large hatches, including ten winches and ten booms. She was also equipped with wireless apparatus and had electric lights installed along the deck.

As built, the ship was 324.0 feet (98.8 m) long (between perpendiculars) and 46.2 feet (14.1 m) abeam and had a depth of 25.0 feet (7.6 m). Lakeside Bridge was originally assessed at 3,545 GRT and 2,174 NRT and had deadweight of approximately 5,300. The vessel had a steel hull with double bottom throughout and a single turbine rated at 1,500 shp, double reduction geared to a single screw propeller, that moved the ship at up to 10 1/2 knots (12.1 mph; 19.4 km/h). The steam for the engine was supplied by two Babcock & Wilcox Water Tube boilers fitted for oil fuel.

The vessel construction was finalized in December 1919 and the ship proceeded to New York on 20 December 1919 where she was inspected by the USSB representatives and officially accepted by them on 22 December 1919.

== Operational history ==
Upon acceptance by USSB the ship was allocated to Alexander Sprunt & Son, major North Carolina cotton trader, for service to United Kingdom. The freighter arrived in Wilmington on December 29 and commenced loading in early January. After taking on board 11,693 bales of cotton, Lakeside Bridge left Wilmington on 13 January 1920 bound for Liverpool. After a stopover at Norfolk for bunkers the freighter arrived at her destination on January 30 after an uneventful trip. After unloading her cargo, she stayed in Europe for several months doing tramp trade between Welsh ports of Cardiff and Port Talbot and Antwerp. On 1 May 1920 the freighter sailed from Wales for Béni Saf where she loaded full cargo of iron ore and delivered it to Baltimore on June 9.

On her next transatlantic trip Lakeside Bridge first sailed from Baltimore in ballast for Port Hastings where she loaded 4,200 tons of coal and departed for Kristiania on 29 July 1920. The freighter reached her destination two weeks later and after unloading returned in ballast to Norfolk in mid-September successfully completing another journey. Upon return the ship was allocated to Lykes Brothers and departed Norfolk for Galveston at the end of October.

Upon arrival the freighter loaded large cargo consisting of 8,491 bales of cotton for Bremen and additional 1,674 bales for Rotterdam and departed Galveston on November 16. The vessel safely arrived in Bremen on December 8.

=== Sinking ===
After unloading her cargo of cotton, Lakeside Bridge left Bremen in ballast on December 17 bound for Galveston. The ship was under command of captain W. M. Atkinson and had a crew of thirty nine. The voyage was largely uneventful until the freighter reached the Azores. The weather got progressively worse turning into full scale gale with strong winds, rain and heavy seas. On Christmas night while approximately 100 nautical miles (190 km; 120 mi) southeast of the island of Pico Lakeside Bridge suddenly lost all blades of her propeller. The vessel became inoperable and a distress signal was sent out immediately. SS Easterling which was approximately 60 miles away responded and rushed to Lakeside Bridge's aid. However, due to heavy rain, fog and poor visibility she was never able to locate the disabled freighter. Meanwhile, the crew used canvas hatch cover to create a makeshift sail in an attempt to exert some sort of control of the ship. In the early hours of December 27 the vessel came into view of the island of Pico. The ship continued to drift along the shore for several hours, but approximately at 07:00 Lakeside Bridge struck the cliffs of the island. Lines were thrown ashore and the entire crew was able to quickly abandon ship with the help of breeches buoy and assisting locals.

The next day the storm subsided somewhat and the crew was able to go back on board to collect some of their belongings. By that time, the freighter had already listed by more than 45 degrees. The crew remained on the island of Pico for the next four days due to continuing storm but was able to leave the island for Horta once the weather improved. The entire crew departed the Azores on 6 January 1921 on board steamer SS Andalusia and safely arrived in New York two weeks later.
