= SS William O'Brien =

History

United States
- Name: William O'Brien
- Namesake: William J. O'Brien
- Owner: East Coast Transportation Co. (1915–1917); Delaware Navigation Co. (Apr–Oct 1917); Huron Navigation Co. (Oct 1917-1920)
- Operator: W.R. Grace & Co. (June–Sept 1915); East Coast Transportation Co. (Oct 1915–Jan 1917); Cosmopolitan Shipping Co. (Apr–Oct 1917); Army Transportation Service (Oct 1917–February 1919); France & Canada Steamship Co. (1919–1920)
- Builder: New York Shipbuilding Co., Camden
- Cost: US$400,000
- Yard number: 158
- Laid down: 9 September 1914
- Launched: 27 February 1915
- Commissioned: 17 April 1915
- Maiden voyage: 20 June 1915
- Home port: New York
- Identification: US Official Number 213085; Call sign LFHQ
- Fate: Foundered, 18 April 1920

General characteristics
- Type: Cargo ship
- Tonnage: 5,146 GRT; 3,099 NRT; 7,438 DWT
- Length: 353 ft 3 in (107.67 m)
- Beam: 51 ft 2 in (15.60 m)
- Depth: 24 ft 2 in (7.37 m)
- Installed power: 301 Nhp, 2,000 ihp
- Propulsion: New York Shipbuilding Co. 3-cylinder triple expansion
- Speed: 9 1/2 knots (10.9 mph; 17.6 km/h)

William O'Brien was a steam cargo ship built in 1914–1915 by New York Shipbuilding Company of Camden for the Carpenter–O'Brien Lumber Company of Delaware. The vessel was extensively employed on East Coast to Europe routes during her career and foundered on one of her regular trips in April 1920.

== Design and construction ==
The Carpenter–O'Brien Lumber Company controlled by the William J. O'Brien's family of Minnesota was incorporated in Delaware in May 1913. As part of their expansion eastward they acquired a large tract of pine forest in central Florida near a town of Carbur, and built a sawmill in Eastport, a town not far from Jacksonville on the St. John's River. The Eastport sawmill were to mill pine logs coming from the O'Brien's holdings, and from there ship them by sea to the company's yard on Staten Island. In 1914 the company placed an order with the New York Shipbuilding Co. to build a cargo steamship, specifically designed for lumber transportation. The vessel was designed by San Francisco naval architect and marine engineer Edward S. Hough to be used seamlessly with monorail conveyor loading and unloading systems employed in many lumber-handling ports. The freighter was laid down on 9 September 1914 at the builder's shipyard and launched on 27 February 1915 (yard number 158), with Miss Alice O'Brien, daughter of William J. O'Brien of St. Paul, one of the principal owners of the company, being the sponsor.

The vessel was designed specifically as a lumber carrier capable of carrying approximately 3,000,000 feet of packaged lumber on each trip. The ship had a single steel deck with poop and combined shelter deck and forecastle, had her machinery located aft and had eight main cargo holds. A water-tight center-line bulkhead ran the entire length of the ship from keel to the top of main deck. In order to be able to load and unload her cargo in a day or less, her holds and hatches were arranged in such a way so they could easily work together with the conveyor cargo loading system. The freighter had no cargo-handling gear of her own with the exception of a forward hoist which were to be used sparingly. The vessel was also equipped with wireless apparatus located in the bridge house, had submarine signal system installed and had electrical lights installed along the decks.

As built, the ship was 353 feet 3 inches (107.67 m) long (between perpendiculars) and 51 feet 2 inches (15.60 m) abeam, a depth of 24 feet 2 inches (7.37 m). William O'Brien was originally assessed at 5,146 GRT and 3,099 NRT and had deadweight of approximately 7,000. The vessel had a steel hull with double bottom fitted only under machinery room and No. 2 hold, and a single 301 Nhp (2,000 ihp) vertical reciprocating triple expansion steam engine, with cylinders of 24 1/2-inch (62 cm), 38 1/2-inch (98 cm) and 67-inch (170 cm) diameter with a 45-inch (110 cm) stroke, that drove a single screw propeller and moved the ship at up to 9 1/2 knots (10.9 mph; 17.6 km/h). The steam for the engine was supplied by three single-ended Scotch marine boilers fitted for oil fuel.

The sea trials were held on the Delaware River on 15 April 1915 during which the steamer performed satisfactorily. Following their successful completion, the freighter was handed over to her owners on April 17.

== Operational history ==
After delivery William O'Brien remained berthed in New York awaiting completion of the owner's yard on Staten Island. While idle, the freighter was chartered for three months by the W.R. Grace & Co. to transport lumber from Puget Sound to the East Coast. William O'Brien then proceeded to Philadelphia where she loaded 5,300 tons of coal for delivery to the Bremerton Navy Yard. The freighter departed Philadelphia for her maiden voyage on 20 June 1915, arriving at the Panama Canal nine days later. While transiting through the canal, the vessel got stranded and suffered some minor damage to her hull. After an uneventful journey through the Pacific, she arrived at her destination on July 22. After undergoing quick repairs and unloading her cargo, she proceeded to visit several ports around the Puget Sound such as Tacoma and Mukilteo where she took on board a load of 1,000 tons of copper and 3,250,000 feet of lumber and departed for East Coast on August 16. The freighter reached New York on September 19, thus successfully concluding her maiden trip. Upon completion of the trip, the vessel was returned to her owners and was put under control of East Coast Transportation Co., a subsidiary of Carpenter–O'Brien Lumber Co., and proceeded on her first trip down the Atlantic coast arriving at Jacksonville on October 5. William O'Brien continued serving this general route through the end of 1916 carrying lumber from Jacksonville to New York on her northward journeys, and returning down south with general merchandise.

Late in 1916 Carpenter-O'Brien Lumber decided to divest itself of their Florida holdings including their lumber freighter William O'Brien. Early in 1917 the vessel was put into New York Shipbuilding Co. drydock for modifications to make it suitable to carry cargo other than packaged lumber. In February 1917, New York banker Sylvester W. Labrot and three of his partners formed Delaware Navigation Corporation and through it acquired steamer William O'Brien for approximately US$1,600,000 to serve on a route between East Coast and Europe. After delivery in April 1917 the vessel was put under management of Cosmopolitan Shipping Co. to be employed on New York to Genoa route. At the same time the owners created a new entity, Huron Navigation Corp., with a goal to increase capitalization with William O'Brien being transferred to the newly formed company in early October 1917. Under the management of Delaware Navigation Corp. William O'Brien made three trips to Europe before being chartered by the French government to carry general cargo from New York to Le Havre.

On 12 October 1917 while William O'Brien was on her homeward journey, the USSB sent Requisition Order to the ship's owners. The freighter arrived at New York and finished discharging her cargo by October 19 and after obtaining approval from USSB, loaded for her upcoming trip to France. The ship left New York on October 24 and after arriving at Le Havre and unloading her cargo, she was immediately requisitioned by the Army Transportation Service to be used as a supply transport for the American Expeditionary Forces in France. The vessel was directed to proceed to Cardiff where she was surveyed and underwent repairs, and subsequently put under Army control on November 27. On 26 November 1917 while entering the port of Barry Roads and looking for anchorage, William O'Brien struck British steamer SS Kyleakin anchored in port and caused minor damage to the latter's hull.

On 22 November 1917 approximately 90% of Huron Navigation Corp. stock was bought for US$700,000 by the France & Canada Steamship Corp. owned by Charles and Francis R. Mayer bringing the vessel under their control. The Army wanted to use William O'Brien as a collier but after one trip from Cardiff to Le Havre, they discovered the vessel was ill-equipped for that purpose being a former lumber carrier. As a result, in January 1918 they entered into agreement with British Admiralty trading the services of William O'Brien for two smaller vessels capable of carrying coal. The vessel remained in Army service and operated by the British Admiralty through the early part of 1919.

On 16 October 1918 William O'Brien, while in the British Admiralty service, collided in River Mersey with British steamer SS Dorington Court and was forced to beach herself to avoid sinking.

Following the end of hostilities, William O'Brien was discharged from her Army service and departed Liverpool on 26 January 1919 and arrived at New York on February 11 where she was examined and returned to her owners on February 21. The freighter then remained in operation by France & Canada Steamship Line who used the steamer to transport various cargo to Europe. The ship sailed on her next trip in June 1919 with general cargo for Denmark and Sweden, and from there proceeded to Buenos Aires. After unloading her cargo there, the vessel continued on to Tocopilla where she loaded 6,500 tons of nitrate of soda and departed in mid-October bound for Antwerp. On her return trip from Europe in mid-December 1919 the freighter was forced to be put into Flushing due to her running out of fuel.

=== Sinking ===
William O'Brien cleared out from Newport News on her last voyage with approximately 6,500 tons of coal on 10 April 1920 bound for Rotterdam. Upon departure there was a disagreement between the captain and part of the crew, and the vessel called in at New York where the chief engineer disembarked and his replacement boarded the vessel. The freighter left New York on April 15 with a crew of forty. At approximately 21:30 on 18 April 1920 while in an approximate position 39°50′N 65°50′W the steamer sent out a distress call stating that she ran into strong gale and her cargo hatches were opened and blown off and that she was taking on water rapidly. The message was received by steamers SS Baltic, SS Port Saunders and SS Minnekahda who were in the vicinity and proceeded to aid the sinking ship. The signal was also relayed to the US Coast Guard and two cutters, Seminole and Acushnet, were dispatched from Woods Hole to search for survivors. On April 20 Port Saunders radioed that she encountered an empty lifeboat marked William O'Brien in approximately the same area as last reported by the distressed vessel. On April 22 cutter Acushnet found a name board belonging to the missing steamer in a potential place of the foundering floating in the sea covered by fuel oil. The search for the survivors continued for several more days but no trace of William O'Brien or any other lifeboats were ever found. Cutter Acushnet eventually was recalled to Boston on April 25.
