= USS Admiral (SP-541) =

Patrol vessel of the United States Navy

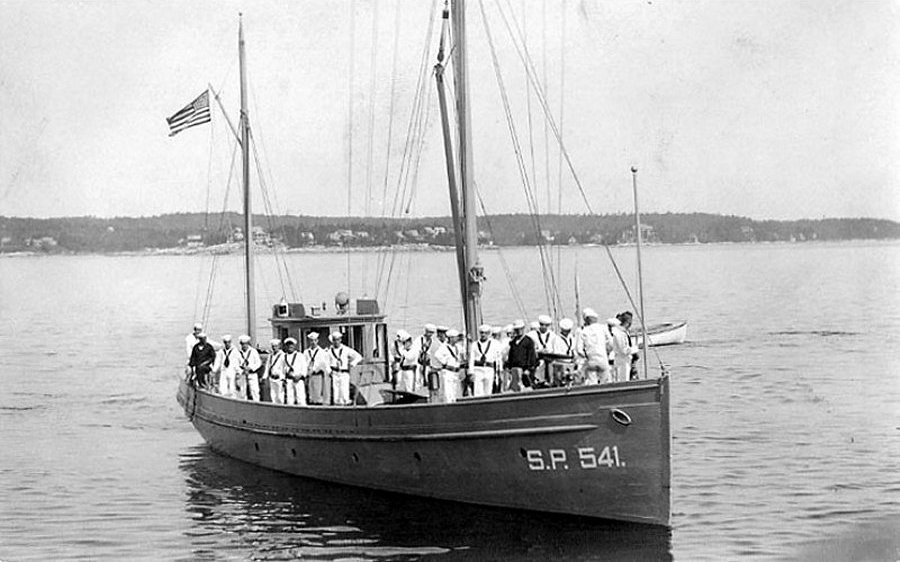

History

United States
- Name: USS Admiral (SP 541)
- Builder: Adams, Boothbay Harbor, ME
- Launched: 1913
- Acquired: 1 May 1917
- Commissioned: 31 May 1917
- Fate: Transferred to the Coast Guard 21 April 1919

United States
- Name: USCGC Leader
- Acquired: 16 December 1919
- Fate: Destroyed by fire 2 April 1920.

General characteristics
- Displacement: 35 t
- Length: 73 ft (22 m)
- Beam: 16 ft (4.9 m)
- Draft: 8 ft (2.4 m)
- Propulsion: gasoline engine, one shaft.
- Speed: 8 knots
- Complement: 12
- Armament: One 3-pounder and two .30 cal. machine guns

Admiral was a wooden-hulled motorboat built by Adams, of Boothbay, Maine, in 1913—was acquired by the United States Navy from the Governor of the state of Maine on 1 May 1917 for section patrol duty in the 1st Naval District. Assigned the classification SP-541, Admiral was placed in commission on 31 May 1917.

Regarded as an "excellent seagoing design" of "very heavy construction," and "perfectly sound," Admiral performed "especially good service ... in Boothbay Harbor . . . breaking ice and keeping the harbor clear" during her winter operations. The sketchy records that are extant for this craft show very little of the character of her operations, but do indicate that she continued patrol duties until well after the armistice of November 1918.

Transferred to the Coast Guard on 21 April 1919, Admiral was taken over by that service at Boston, that June, and stationed at Portsmouth, NH She was renamed Leader on 16 December 1919 in Coast Guard Circular Letter No. 118, but she did not serve long under that name; for, on 2 April 1920, her gasoline tank exploded, and the resultant fire destroyed the boat.
