= Diocese of Smolensk =

Diocese (or Bishopric or Eparchy) of Smolensk may refer to the following ecclesiastical jurisdictions :

- the present Russian Orthodox Diocese of Smolensk
- two former Catholic bishoprics :
  - Roman Catholic Diocese of Smolensk (Latin)
  - Ruthenian Catholic Eparchy of Smolensk (Eastern Catholic: Byzantine rite)
