= SS Smolensk =

A number of steamships have been named Smolensk, including:

- SS Smolensk (1901), a ship of the Russian Volunteer Fleet, in service 1901–04, 1906-13 as Smolensk and with the Russian Navy as Rion 1904-06 and 1913–31
- SS Smolensk (1916), a cargo ship in service 1916-29
- SS Smolensk (1931), a cargo ship operated by Sovtorgflot, active until at least 1945
- SS Smolensk (1944), a Hansa A Type cargo ship in service 1946-76
