= February 1920 =

Month in 1920

<<	February 1920					>>
Su	Mo	Tu	We	Th	Fr	Sa
1	2	3	4	5	6	7
8	9	10	11	12	13	14
15	16	17	18	19	20	21
22	23	24	25	26	27	28
29

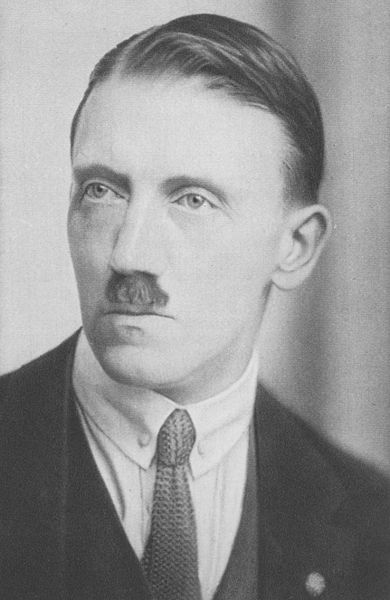
February 24, 1920: German Workers' Party Deputy Chairman Hitler unveils platform of new Nazi Party

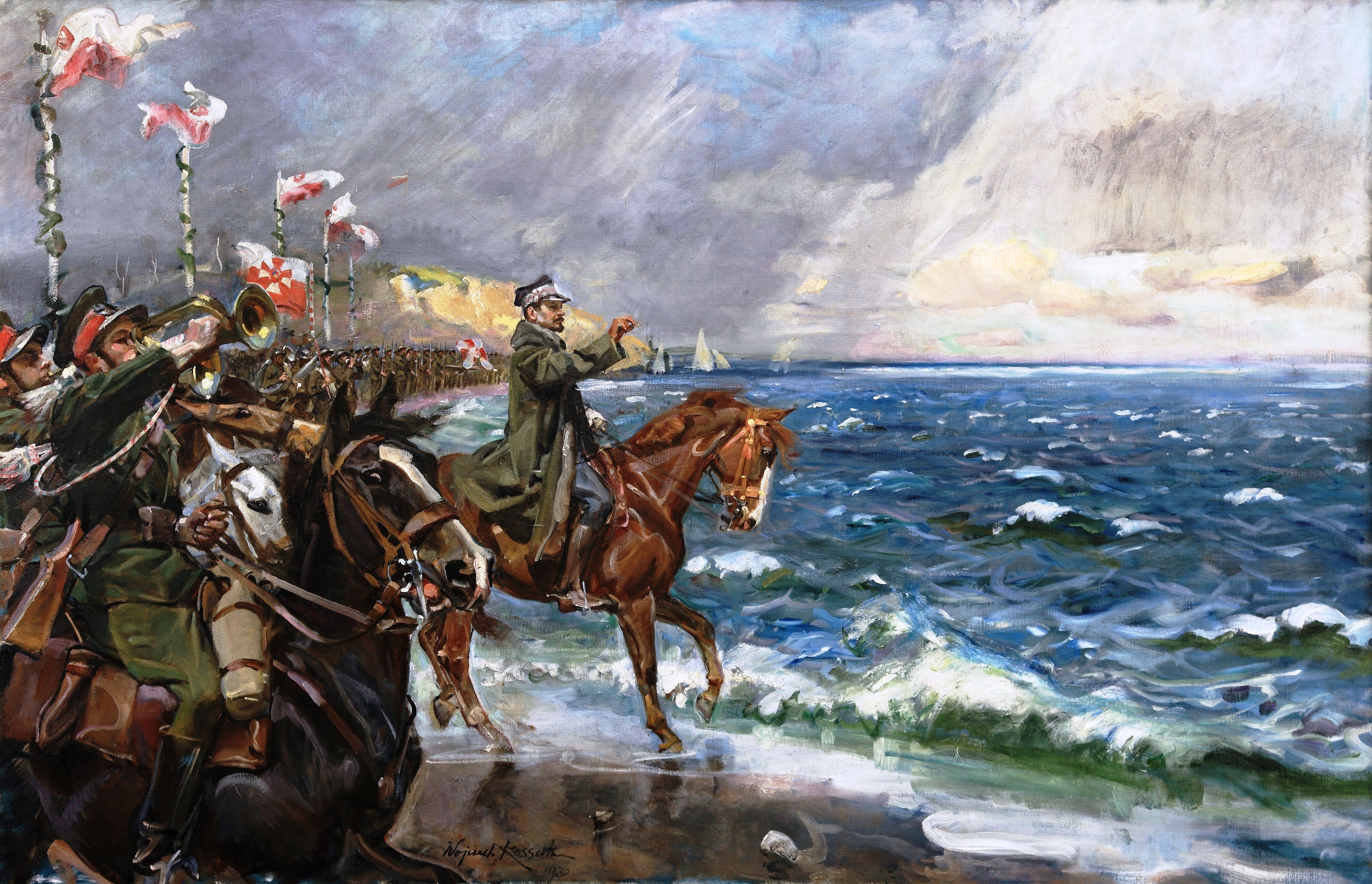
February 10, 1920: Poland regains a seaport

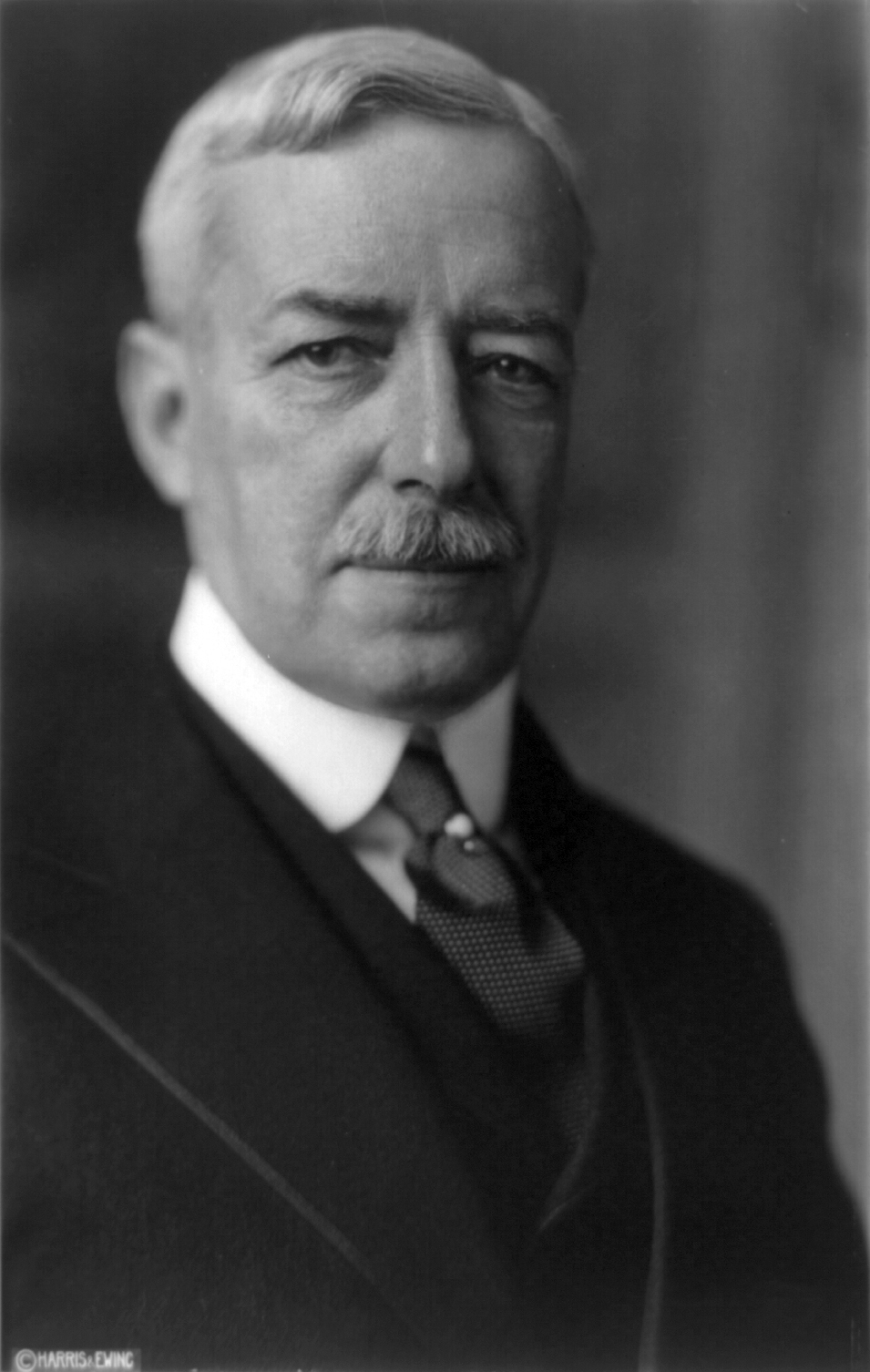
February 13, 1920: U.S. Secretary of State Lansing fired by President Wilson

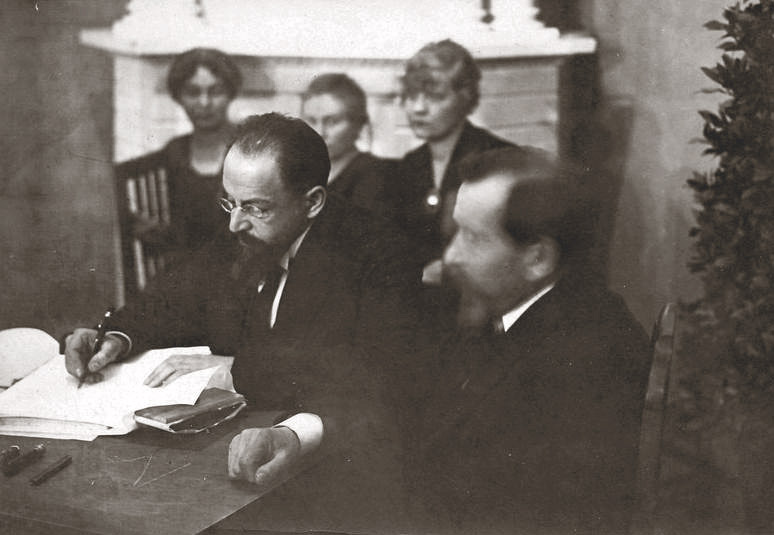
February 2, 1920: Soviet Union recognizes Estonian independence with treaty in Tartu

The following events occurred in February 1920:

== February 1, 1920 (Sunday) ==
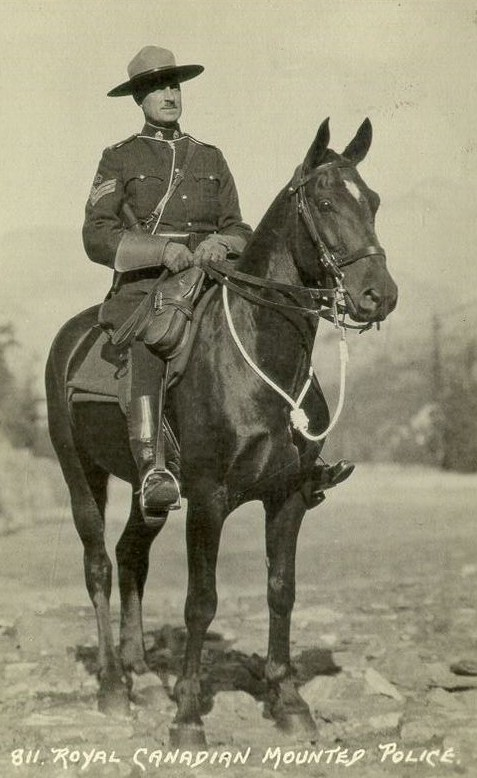
A RCMP "Mountie" in 1931

- The Royal Canadian Mounted Police was created by the merger of the Dominion Police Force and the North-West Mounted Police.
- The Bolshevik government of Soviet Russia authorized the Central Union of Russian Cooperatives to resume trade with the Allied powers of World War I.
- Died: Konstantin Mamontov, 50, Russian military officer who commanded the Don Cossacks army during its fight against the Bolsheviks (b. 1869)

== February 2, 1920 (Monday) ==
- The Treaty of Tartu was signed between the Soviet Union and Estonia (referred to at the time as "Esthonia"), with the Soviets recognizing Estonia as an independent nation and renouncing claims to Estonian territory. The pact, signed at the city of Tartu in Estonia, brought a successful end to the Estonian War of Independence after more than a year of fighting. The Soviet government also agreed to pay five million gold rubles and permission to purchase 2.5 million acres of Russian timber, in return for use of the Narva River for development of hydroelectric power. Estonian independence would last for 20 years, but the nation would be annexed into the Soviet Union on August 6, 1940. The Republic of Estonia would remain part of the U.S.S.R. until August 20, 1991.
- The U.S. Census Bureau announced that the death rate in the United States in 1918 was the highest on record, with 1,471,367 people dying, a rate of 18 per every 1,000 people. Of the total, nearly one-third—477,467—had died in the Spanish influenza epidemic from either the flu or from complications with pneumonia.
- Born: Han Young-suk, Korean folk dancer, preserved the art of the traditional Seungmu and Taepyeongmu Korean dances, honored as a Ingan-munhwage; in Cheonan, Chōsen, Japanese Empire (present-day Cheonan, South Chungcheong Province, South Korea) (d. 1990)
- Died:Maurice "Moss" Enright, American gangster and labor racketeer; killed in a drive-by shooting after stepping out of his car in front of his home on Chicago's Garfield Avenue.

== February 3, 1920 (Tuesday) ==
- The Allies submitted a list to the German government, with the names of almost 1,000 accused German war criminals whose extradition for trial would be sought. Germany's Defense Minister, Gustav Noske commented to a London Daily Mail reporter, "the surrender of these men is virtually impossible, turn it how you will."
- Born:
  - George Armitage Miller, American psychologist, co-founder of cognitive psychology; in Charleston, West Virginia, United States (d. 2012)
  - Khieu Ponnary, Cambodian Khmer Rouge official, wife of Pol Pot; in Battambang Province, Cambodia, French Indochina (present-day Cambodia) (d. 2003)

== February 4, 1920 (Wednesday) ==
- Australia's NRMA, an automobile owners group offering roadside assistance and travel advice to its members, was established as the National Roads and Motorists' Association.
- The Hultschiner region of the German Empire's Prussian Province of Silesia, inhabited mostly by speakers of the Czech language, was turned over to Czechoslovakia pursuant to treaty. The 122.4 square miles (317 km^{2}) territory is now part of the Czech Republic. Among the villages renamed was Schreibersdorf, now called Hněvošice. The city of Hultschin itself was renamed Hlučín.
- Born:
  - Gerardo Guerrieri, Italian playwright, known for translating numerous foreign plays into the Italian language; in Matera, Kingdom of Italy (present-day Italy) (d. 1986)
  - LeRay Wilson, U.S. Navy sailor, killed after saving the ship USS William B. Preston. Another ship, USS LeRay Wilson, was later named in his honor; in Cove, Oregon, United States (d. 1942, killed in action)
- Died:
  - Edward Payson Ripley, 74, American railroad executive, 14th president of the Atchison, Topeka & Santa Fe Railway (b. 1845)
  - O. C. Barber, 78, American industrialist, owner of the Diamond Match Company, founded the town of Barberton, Ohio (b. 1841)
  - Jean Louis Émile Boudier, 92, French mycologist, discovered multiple species of fungi (b. 1828)

== February 5, 1920 (Thursday) ==
- A fire destroyed the buildings of the 130-year old University of King's College in Windsor, Nova Scotia. The university would be rebuilt by a grant from the Carnegie Foundation, but only on the condition that it be relocated 40 miles (64 km) to Halifax, adjacent to the campus of Dalhousie University.
- Fifty-six officers and soldiers of the New Zealand Army, commanded by then-Major Edward Puttick were dispatched to the island of Fiji during a period of civil unrest, departing on the government-owned ship Tutanekai. The Fiji Expeditionary Force would serve as a peacekeeping unit as part of the first peacetime overseas deployment of New Zealand forces until April 18.
- Smith College of Northampton, Massachusetts, began an unusual fundraising campaign by directing its alumni to call on every family in the United States with the surname "Smith" to donate one dollar "to perpetuate the name of the largest college for women in the world."
- Born: Willemiena Bouwman, Dutch social worker and member of the Dutch Resistance, credited with the rescue of numerous Jewish children in the Netherlands during World War II; in Gees, Netherlands (d. 2007)

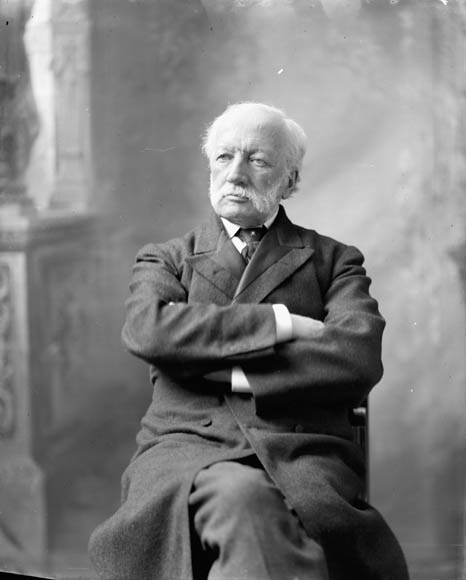
Sir James Grant (1831-1920

- Died:
  - James Grant, 88, Canadian physician and political figure, last surviving member of Canada's first House of Commons (b. 1831)
  - Earl Burgess, 30, American film stuntman; slipped and fell 700 feet from an airplane during the filming of a comedy in California

== February 6, 1920 (Friday) ==
- France's Prime Minister, Alexandre Millerand, called for a vote of confidence on his government's foreign policy of strict adherence to the terms of the Treaty of Versailles, and received an endorsement of 518 to 68.
- The Commonwealth of Virginia became the third U.S. state to reject women's suffrage and the proposed 19th Amendment to the U.S. Constitution, as the vote in the state Senate failed, 10 to 24. More than 30 years after the amendment had been ratified, Virginia's legislature would approve the amendment on February 21, 1952.
- During a blizzard, the American concrete cargo ship SS Polias ran aground on a reef off the U.S. coast near Port Clyde, Maine, and 11 of her crew disregarded the skipper's orders and abandoned ship in a lifeboat rather than wait to be rescued. All 11 were killed when their boat was blown against the hull of Polias, broke up, and sank. The rest of the crew evacuated the next day in lifeboats and were picked up by the U.S. Coast Guard cutter USCGC Acushnet.

== February 7, 1920 (Saturday) ==
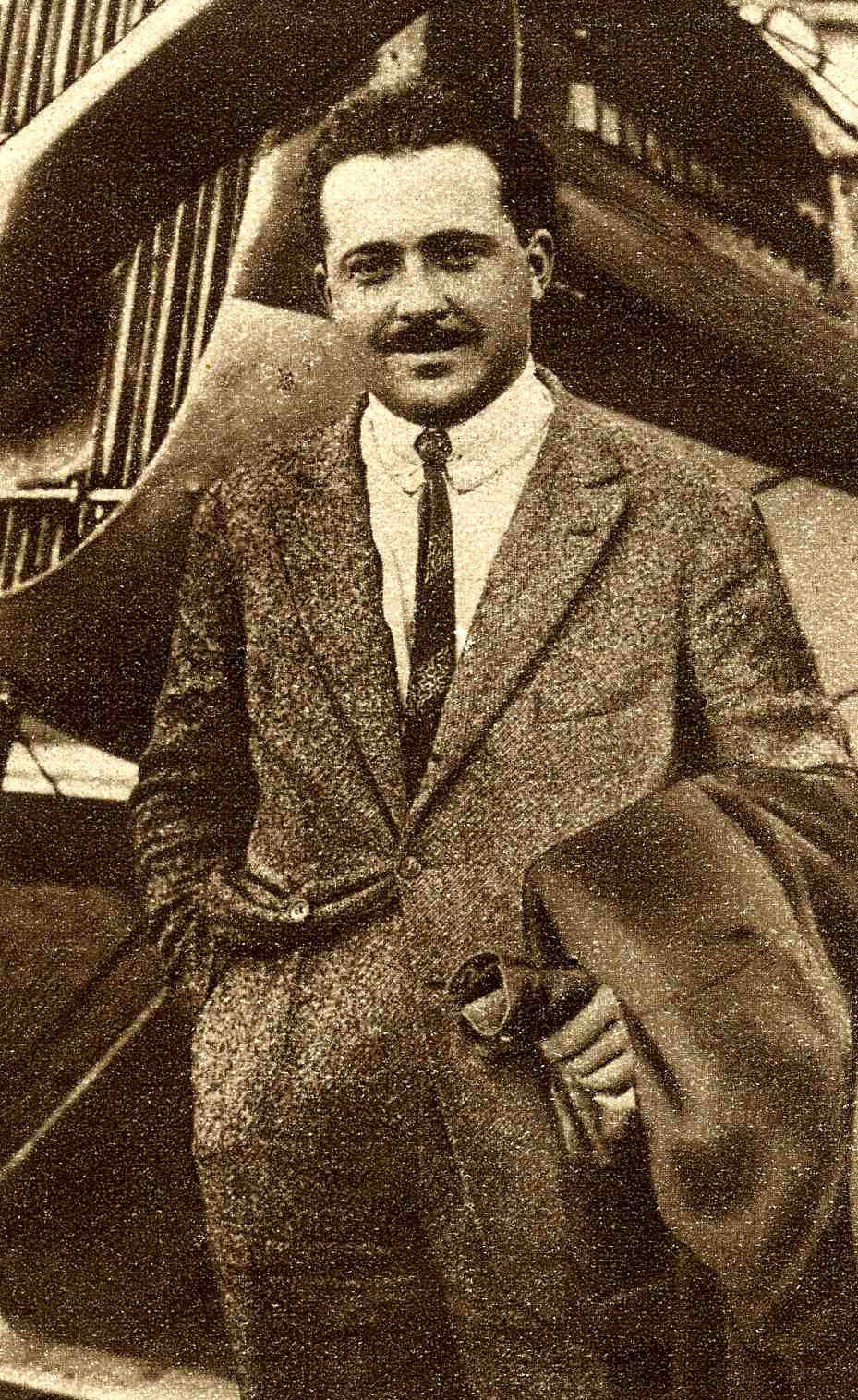
Fastest pilot, Sadi-Lecointe

- Admiral Alexander Kolchak, the former "Supreme Leader of Russia" was executed in a prison in Irkutsk, along with his former prime minister, Viktor Pepelyayev.
- French aviator Joseph Sadi-Lecointe set a new record for fastest time to travel one kilometer — 13.05 seconds — with an average speed of 275.86 kilometres per hour (171.41 mph) in a Nieuport-Delage NiD 29 airplane.
- Having recovered from a stroke that had kept him bedridden for several months, U.S. President Woodrow Wilson confronted his Secretary of State, Robert Lansing, asking, "Is it true, as I have been told, that during my illness you have frequently called the heads of the executive departments of government into conference?", adding that if it was true, "Under our constitutional law and practice, no one but the president has the right to summon" cabinet members to a meeting, "and no one but the president and the congress has the right to ask their views or the views of any one of them on any public question." Lansing responded two days later, conceding that he frequently called meetings "in view of the fact that we were denied communication with you." The response led Wilson to ask Lansing's resignation on February 11.
- The Soviet government established an agency to audit its civil servants, Rabkrin (an acronym for Raboche-Krestyanskaya Inspektsiya (the Workers'—Peasants' Inspectorate).
- Died: Richard Bullock, 72, Cornwall-born American trickshot artist who portrayed "Deadwood Dick" in vaudeville (b. 1847)

== February 8, 1920 (Sunday) ==
- The first American film cartoon to be shown in color, The Debut of Thomas Katt, was released to American theaters by Bray Productions. The animated movie film used the Brewster Color process that had been patented by Percy Douglas Brewster in 1913.

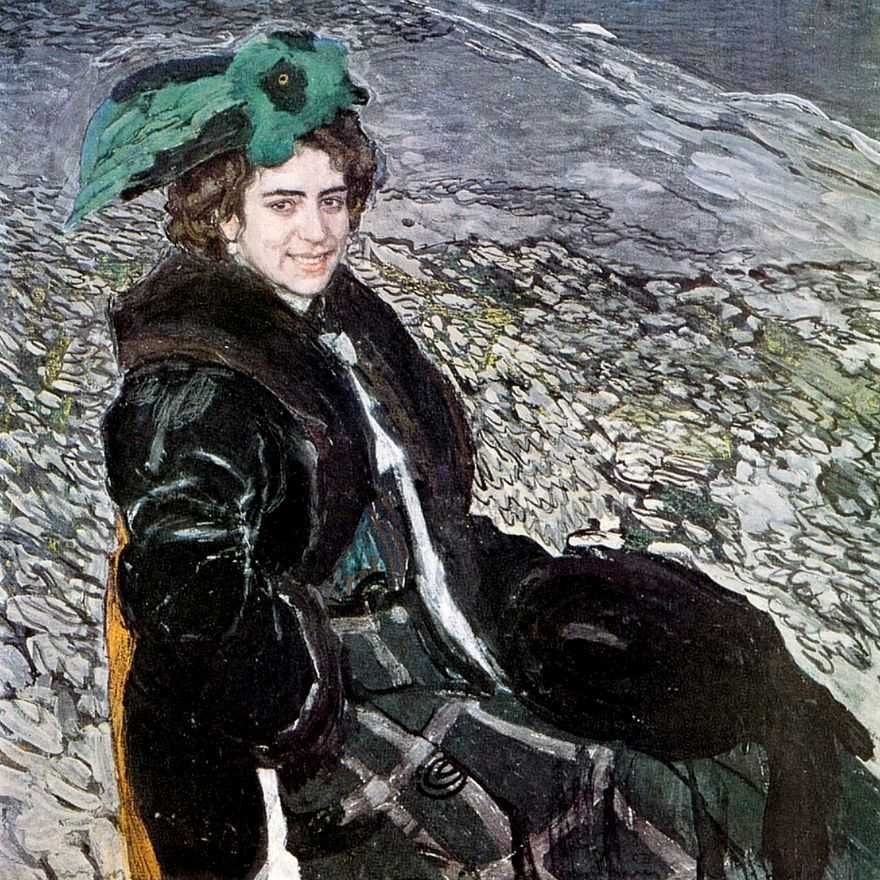
Smirnova

- In Albania, the Congress of Lushnjë proclaimed Tirana as the new nation's temporary capital, after the city of Durrës had served as the capital since 1918. Tirana would still be the Balkan nation's capital a century later.
- Prima ballerina Elena Smirnova performed in Russia for the final time, as the production of Romance of the Roses closed. Smirnova and other artists subsequently fled from the Soviet Union. She would never return to Russia, and would die in 1934.
- Born:
  - George W. George, American stage and film producer, known for the 1981 movie My Dinner with Andre; as George Warren Goldberg, in New York City, United States (d. 2007)
  - Viola Herms Drath, German-American playwright, journalist and author; as Viola Herms, in Düsseldorf, Weimar Republic (present-day Germany) (d. 2011, murdered)

== February 9, 1920 (Monday) ==
Svalbard

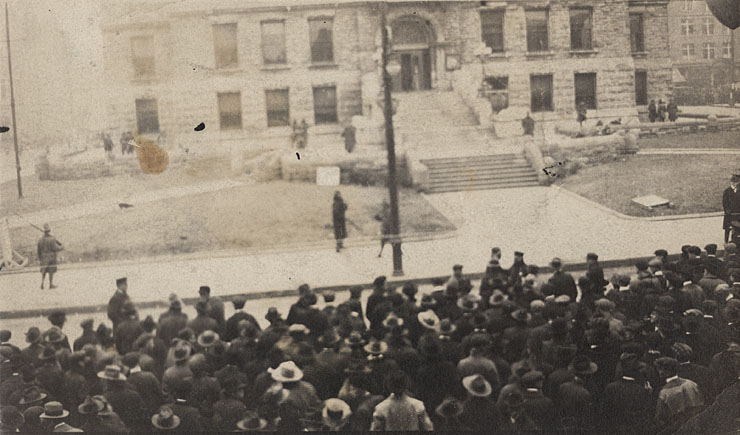
Lexington riot

- The Svalbard islands, located above the Arctic Circle, were recognized as territory of Norway in the Spitsbergen Treaty signed in Paris by seven European nations.
- The Battle of Urfa began after a former Ottoman Empire official, Ali Saip Bey, had unsuccessfully demanded that a garrison of French occupation forces withdraw from the area that they were claiming as French territory. The 473 soldiers defending Urfa would withstand a siege by Turkish and Kurdish forces for 61 days; almost all of the defenders would be killed after having been promised that they would receive safe passage following a surrender.
- The U.S. Senate voted, 63 to 9, to allow consideration of the Treaty of Versailles again and referred it to the Foreign Relations Committee.
- The Brotherhood of Maintenance of Way Employees and Railway Shop Workers, an American labor union, called for its 300,000 members to walk out on strike on February 17 if an agreement on wages could not be resolved with the U.S. Railroad Administration.
- Five people in Lexington, Kentucky, were killed by the state National Guard after attempting to storm the city courthouse to lynch Will Lockett (alias for Petrie Kimbrough), an African-American serial killer who had confessed to the killing of three women and a child, 10-year old Geneva Hardman. Lockett would be executed by electric chair on March 11.
- Born:
  - Herbert Bachnick, German Luftwaffe fighter ace, credited with 80 aerial victories, awarded the Knight's Cross of the Iron Cross; in Mannheim, Weimar Republic (present-day Germany) (d. 1944, killed in action)
  - Grigory Rechkalov, Soviet ace fighter pilot, credited with more than 50 shootdowns during World War II, awarded the title Hero of the Soviet Union; in the Irbitsky District, Sverdlovsk Oblast, Russian SFSR (present-day Russia) (d. 1990)
- Died: David Ward King, 62, American inventor, created the horse-drawn King road drag and the first road grader (b. 1857)

== February 10, 1920 (Tuesday) ==
- In a plebiscite taken in the former northern portion of the German Duchy of Schleswig, residents voted by a 3 to 1 margin to become part of the Kingdom of Denmark. The formal transfer would take place on June 15 as the districts of Hadersleben, Apenrade, Sonderburg and Tondern became Haderslev, Aabenraa, Sønderborg and Tønder. The official results issued in Copenhagen were 75,023 Schleswig voters in favor of their land becoming part of Denmark, and 25,087 voting in favor of remaining part of Germany.
- French Army troops, under the command of General Louis Albert Quérette, abandoned their garrison at the former Ottoman Empire city of Maraş and allowed the Turkish National Forces to reclaim the site, bringing an end to the Battle of Marash. The French forces had been protecting 20,000 Armenian civilians who had been relocated to Maraş following the Armenian Genocide, and although more than 4,000 fled with the French troops, more than 8,000 left behind were killed when the Turks entered the city. Of the Armenians who did depart with the French troops, only 1,500 survived the winter weather during the retreat to another French fortress at İslâhiye.
- There ceremony of the "Wedding to the Sea" (Zaślubiny Polski z morzem) was carried out as Poland regained territory from Germany along the Baltic Sea. Lieutenant General Józef Haller of the Polish Army carried out the symbolic union of Poland to the sea at the seaport town of Puck, formerly Putzig.

== February 11, 1920 (Wednesday) ==
- The British House of Commons voted to reject a resolution for nationalization of the nation's coal mines. The vote, on whether to accept the recommendation of the Royal Commission on the Coal Industry for nationalization, was defeated by a margin of 329 against and only 64 for.
- Born: Prince Farouk of Egypt, Egyptian noble, King of Egypt from 1936 until his overthrow in 1952, son of Sultan Fuad of Egypt; in Cairo, Sultanate of Egypt (present-day Egypt) (d. 1965)
- Died: Gaby Deslys, 38, French singer and actress; died of a throat infection two months after becoming ill in the Spanish flu epidemic (b. 1881)

== February 12, 1920 (Thursday) ==
- The Parliament of the Ottoman Empire, published its final report, the Misak-ı Millî, after closing out its existence at a January 28 meeting in Constantinople (now Istanbul). The six point policy was alarming enough to the victorious Allies that they sent troops to occupy Istanbul on March 16, and sponsored the creation of a republic and a new parliament, the Grand National Assembly of Turkey, with its capital at Ankara.
- Born: Quentin Fiore, American graphic designer; in the Bronx, New York, United States (d. 2019)
- Died: Aurore Gagnon, 10, Canadian child abuse victim; died of sepsis and fatigue. Her stepmother, Marie-Anne Houde, was convicted of murder and sentenced to life in prison (b. 1909)

== February 13, 1920 (Friday) ==
- U.S. President Wilson fired Secretary of State Robert Lansing, two days after asking Lansing to resign, stating "I feel it is my duty to accept your resignation, to take effect at once." President Wilson reportedly stated in three letters that Secretary Lansing had usurped presidential authority by countermanding Wilson's foreign policy decisions. One day after Wilson wrote to Lansing that "I am very much disappointed" and stated "it would relieve me of embarrassment, Mr. Secretary... if you would give your present office up, and afford me an opportunity to select someone whose mind would more willingly go along with mine." On Thursday, Lansing formally presented his requested resignation.
- The League of Nations admitted Switzerland as a neutral member and appointed a commission to determine the future of the Saar valley.

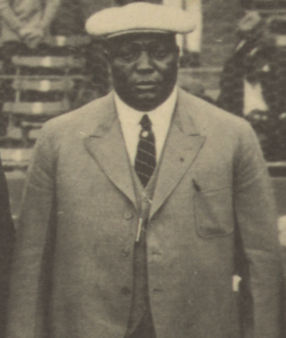
NNL Founder Foster

- The Negro National League was established as the first African-American baseball league to last more than one season. Rube Foster and seven other team owners met in Kansas City to make plans to begin play starting on May 1. The initial teams were the Chicago American Giants, the traveling Chicago Giants and Cuban Stars, the Dayton Marcos, the Detroit Stars, the Indianapolis ABCs, the Kansas City Monarchs and the St. Louis Giants.
- Born: A. Maruthakasi, Indian songwriter and poet who wrote mainly in the Tamil language; as Ayyamperumal Maruthakasiudayar, in Melakudikadu, Trichinopoly District, Madras Province, British India (present-day India) (d. 1989)
- Died: Otto Gross, 42, Austrian psychoanalyst; died of pneumonia (b. 1877)

== February 14, 1920 (Saturday) ==
- The League of Women Voters was founded in Chicago, Illinois by Carrie Chapman Catt, succeeding the National American Women's Suffrage Association, following the approval of the 19th Amendment.
- Most of the 515 suspected American subversives detained on Ellis Island were released after posting bail, while charges were dismissed on another 100 after the cases were processed. The others were held to await deportation.

== February 15, 1920 (Sunday) ==
- French troops, under the command of General Odry began their occupation of the Memel Territory, territory of the German Kingdom of Prussia surrendered to the League of Nations in the 1919 Treaty of Versailles. The Memel territory is the Klaipėda Region of Lithuania.
- The first Hakone Ekiden, Japan's annual marathon college relay race, was won by the University of Tokyo team, as Zensaku Motegi crossed the finish line first Created by Japanese Olympic runner Shizo Kanakuri, the two-day race began and ended at the Ōtemachi district of Tokyo, in front of the offices of Tokyo's Yomiuri Shimbun newspaper. The other relay teams in the first race represented Waseda University, Keio University, and Meiji University. Under the rules, each relay team had 10 runners, with five in the relay from Tokyo to Hakone on the first day, and the other five running on the next day's relay back to Tokyo. The average distance the handing off of a baton to the runner at the next station is now 21.6 kilometres (13.4 mi) on the first day and almost 22 kilometres (14 mi) the next day, for a total distance of 217.9 kilometres (135.4 mi). The race is now run as part of the New Year's Day holiday.
- Born:
  - Otto Fönnekold, German Luftwaffe ace with 136 shootdowns; in Hamburg, Weimar Republic (present-day Germany) (d. 1944, killed in action)
  - Adolfo Pérez Zelaschi, Argentine novelist; in San Carlos de Bolívar, Argentina (d. 2005)
  - David Wickins, English entrepreneur, founder of British Car Auctions and saved Lotus Cars; in Tilehurst, England (d. 2007)
- Died: Aleksander Aberg, 38, Estonian professional wrestler; died of pneumonia (b. 1881)

== February 16, 1920 (Monday) ==
- The Allies of World War I accepted a proposal, by Germany, that accused war criminals would be tried by German courts at Leipzig, with the understanding that the arrangement would continue for as long as it appeared that the trials were being conducted in good faith. The German government also agreed that the charges against each indicted defendant would be published by the government for use by the media.
- The Supreme Court of Iceland, the Hæstiréttur, held its first session as the highest court in that nation. Previously, cases decided by the National High Court (the Landsyfirréttur of Reykjavik) were reviewable by the Supreme Court of Denmark.
- Born:
  - Jagdish Chandra Kapur, Indian solar energy entrepreneur and social scientist; in British India (present-day India) (d. 2010)
  - I. S. Johar, Indian comedian and film actor; as Indra Sen Johar, in Talagang, British India (present-day India) (d. 1984)
  - Stephen Peet, British filmmaker and producer of the TV program Yesterday's Witness; in London, England (d. 2006)
- Died: Edward Jones, 65, American statistician and journalist, co-founder of Dow Jones & Company and The Wall Street Journal, known as the "Jones" in the Dow Jones Industrial Average

== February 17, 1920 (Tuesday) ==
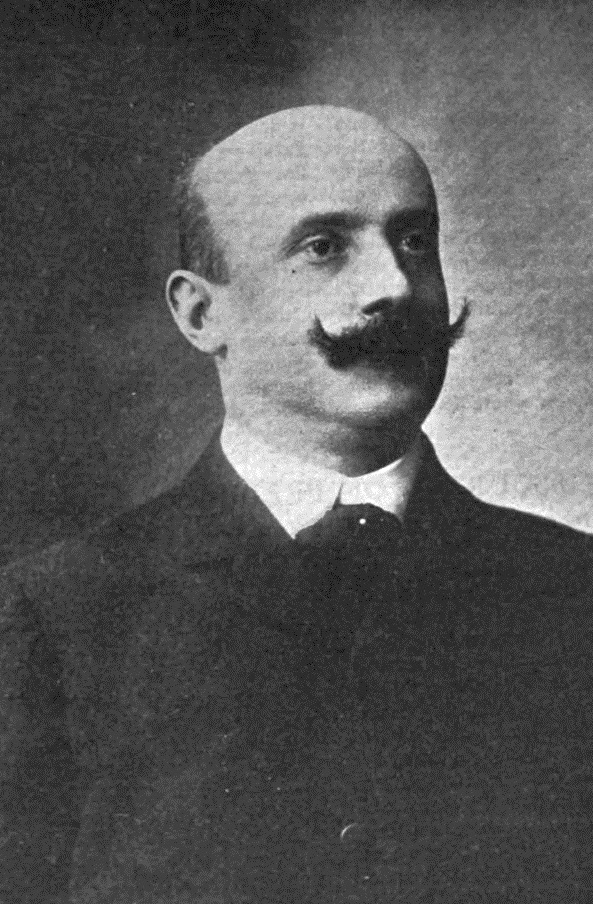
Former premier Caillaux

- Former French Prime Minister Joseph Caillaux, already imprisoned since 1919, was placed on trial for treason by the French Senate.
- Maryland voted to reject the 19th Amendment in separate votes in the state House and state Senate. The vote in the House of Delegates was only 36 for and 64 against ratification, and lost 9 to 18 in the state Senate.
- The Miami Causeway (now the MacArthur Causeway) opened for traffic at 2:00 in the afternoon as a highway and bridge over Florida's Biscayne Bay to connect Miami to the Miami Beach resort area.
- Tom Kelly, an Irish nationalist Sinn Féin member who had been elected Lord Mayor of Dublin while he was incarcerated in England, was conditionally released from Wormwood Scrubs prison near London because of ill health, with the provision that he make no attempt to return to Ireland.
- Born:Saad Nadim, Egyptian journalist and documentary film director; in Boulaq, Sultanate of Egypt (present-day Egypt) (d. 1980)
- Died: Jovan Babunski, 41, commander within the Serbian Chetnik Organization; died of influenza (b. 1878)

== February 18, 1920 (Wednesday) ==
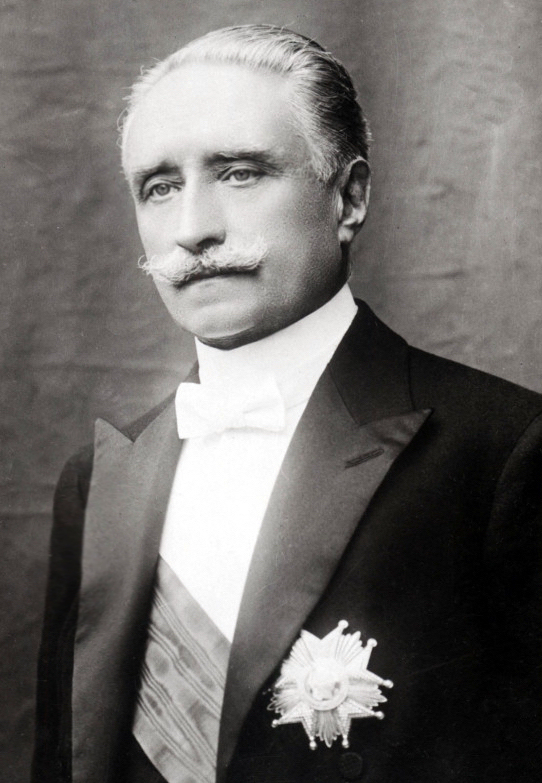
President Deschanel

- Paul Deschanel was sworn into office as the new President of France.
- Will H. Hays, Chairman of the Republican National Committee, announced at a rally in New York that the Party would not accept campaign contributions of more than $1,000. In 1920, according to the U.S. Bureau of Labor Statistics, $1,000 had the buying power of a little less than $13,000 a century later.
- Born:
  - Johnnie Colemon, African American religious leader, known for her revival of the New Thought movement; as Johnnie Haley, in Centerville, Alabama, United States (d. 2014)
  - Bill Cullen, American game show host, host of the original version of The Price Is Right; in Pittsburgh, United States (d. 1990)
- Died:
  - Sammy Marks, 75, Lithuanian-born South African financier (b. 1844)
  - Joseph M. Flannery, 53, American industrialist whose mining and processing company, the Vanadium Corporation, was the world's largest producer of radium

== February 19, 1920 (Thursday) ==
- The Russian port of Arkhangelsk, part of the Severnaya Oblast region defended by the White Army of Admiral Kolchak, was entered and occupied by the Soviet Bolshevik army; Murmansk, the last bastion of the White Army, would fall on March 13. Most of the White Army government officials had evacuated to Norway the week before.
- China's Foreign Minister Lu Zhengxiang and Vice Foreign Minister Chen Lu resigned in protest after interference by conservatives during negotiations with Japan over the Shandong peninsula.
- The U.S. Bureau of Labor Statistics reported that average wages had risen during 1919 by at least 25%, and in some cases, as high as 125%, in eleven leading industries. The BLS also concluded that the number of employees had risen by as much as 50% in some of the businesses surveyed.
- Shareholders of the Grand Trunk Railway in Canada voted to turn operation of the system over to the Canadian government.
- Khosrov bey Sultanov, assigned to be the Governor of Karabakh, a primarily Armenian area claimed by the Azerbaijan Democratic Republic, met with a council of Armenian leaders and demanded that they agree to the incorporation of the area into Azerbaijan. After the Armenians met and rejected the demand, Azerbaijan troops carried out a massacre of civilians on March 22.
- The U.S. Navy demonstrated its new weapon to reporters, an artillery shell powerful enough to penetrate more than 13 inches (330 mm) of armor siding. The new shell, produced at the naval ordnance plant in South Charleston, West Virginia, was fired on the Navy's proving grounds at Indian Head, Maryland.
- Born:
  - Richard E. Byrd, Jr., American arctic explorer, grandson of North Pole explorer Richard E. Byrd; in Boston, United States (d. 1988)
  - Jim Fritzell, American television and film screenwriter; in San Francisco, United States (d. 1979)
  - C. Z. Guest, American fashion model, stage actress and socialite; as Lucy Cochrane Guest, in Boston, United States (d. 2003)
- Died: Georges Fragerolle, 64, French musician, composer, novelist and theatrical producer (b. 1855)

== February 20, 1920 (Friday) ==
- The Communist Party of Azerbaijan (Azərbaycan Kommunist Partiyası), which favored a merger of the Azerbaijan Republic into a federation of Communist republics in the old Russian Empire, was formed at a meeting in Baku by delegates from four political parties (Hummet Party, Adalat Party, Ahrar Party and the Azerbaijan Bolsheviks), with Mirza Davud Huseynov of the Hummet party as its first General Secretary. By April, the Communists would have a majority in the Azerbaijan government; in 1922, they would join with parties in the Armenian and Georgian republics to create a federation and the independent nation would become part of the Union of Soviet Socialist Republics at the end of that year. The Azerbaijan Communists would remain in power until 1991.
- Kin Canada, a Canadian service club, was founded as the Kinsmen of Canada at a meeting in Hamilton, Ontario. Plumbing supply salesman Harold A. Rogers created the group after his application to the Hamilton Rotary Club was denied.
- The city of Metapa, in Nicaragua, was renamed Ciudad Darío in honor of its most famous native, poet Rubén Darío.
- U.S. Customs authorities made their first reported confiscation of imported liquor since Prohibition had gone into effect a few weeks earlier. The yacht Genesee, owned by playboy W. K. Vanderbilt Jr., had been carrying "about $1,800 worth of spirituous liquors" (almost $24,000 in current USD buying power) as it arrived at Key West, Florida, after its departure from Cuba.
- The Greek cargo ship Aghia Paraskevi wrecked off of the coast of Cape St. Thomas, Argentina, with the loss of 15 of her crew, while survivors were rescued by the British ship SS Carnarvonshire.

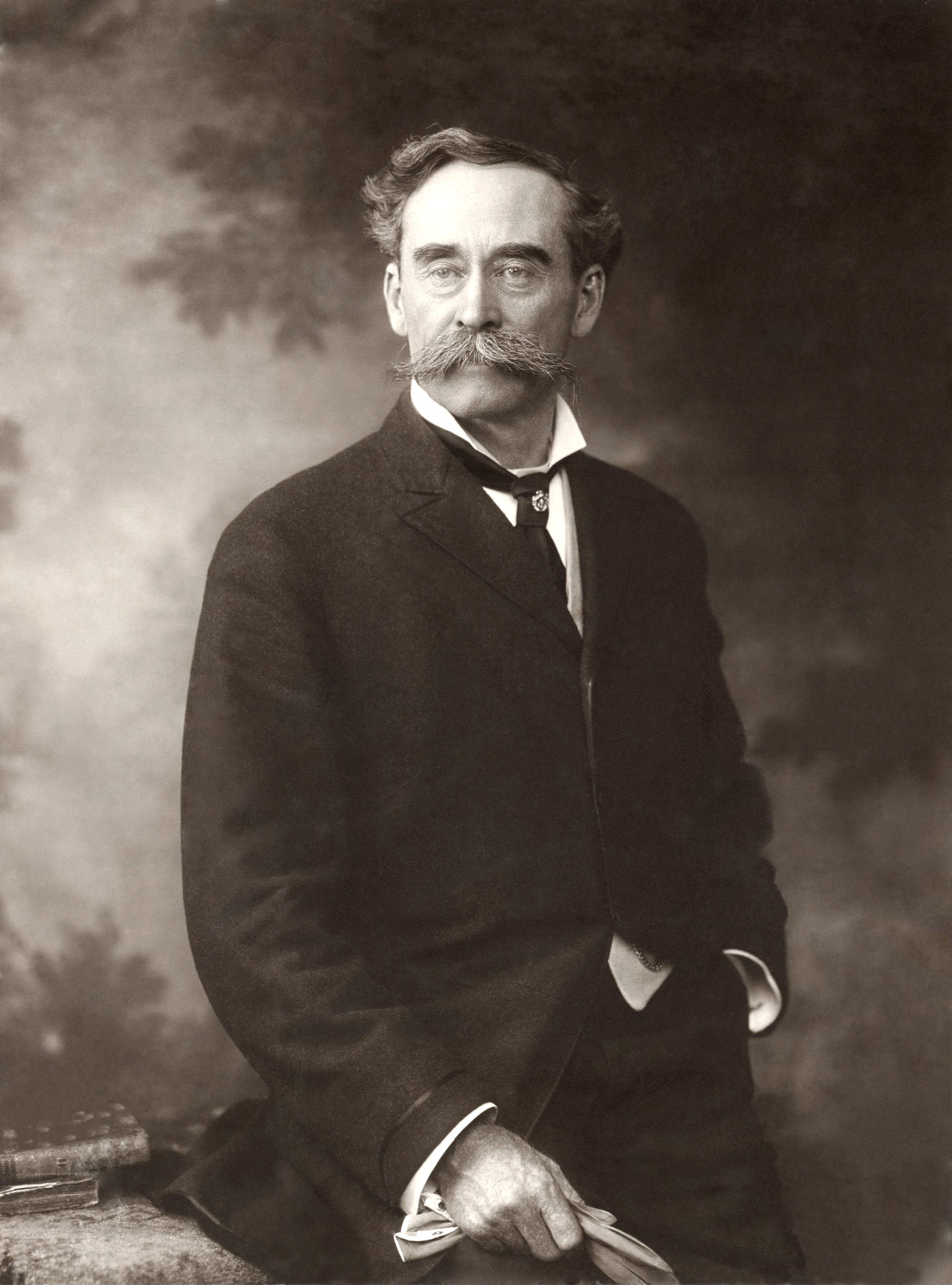
Robert E. Peary (1856-1920)

- Died:
  - Robert E. Peary, 63, American Arctic explorer and officer in the U.S. Navy, long credited as the first to reach the North Pole in 1909, although now considered to have been unlikely (b. 1856)
  - Jacinta Marto, 9, Portuguese saint, one of first people to report the prophecy of the Miracle of Fátima, canonized by the Roman Catholic Church in 2017; died of influenza (b. 1910)

== February 21, 1920 (Saturday) ==
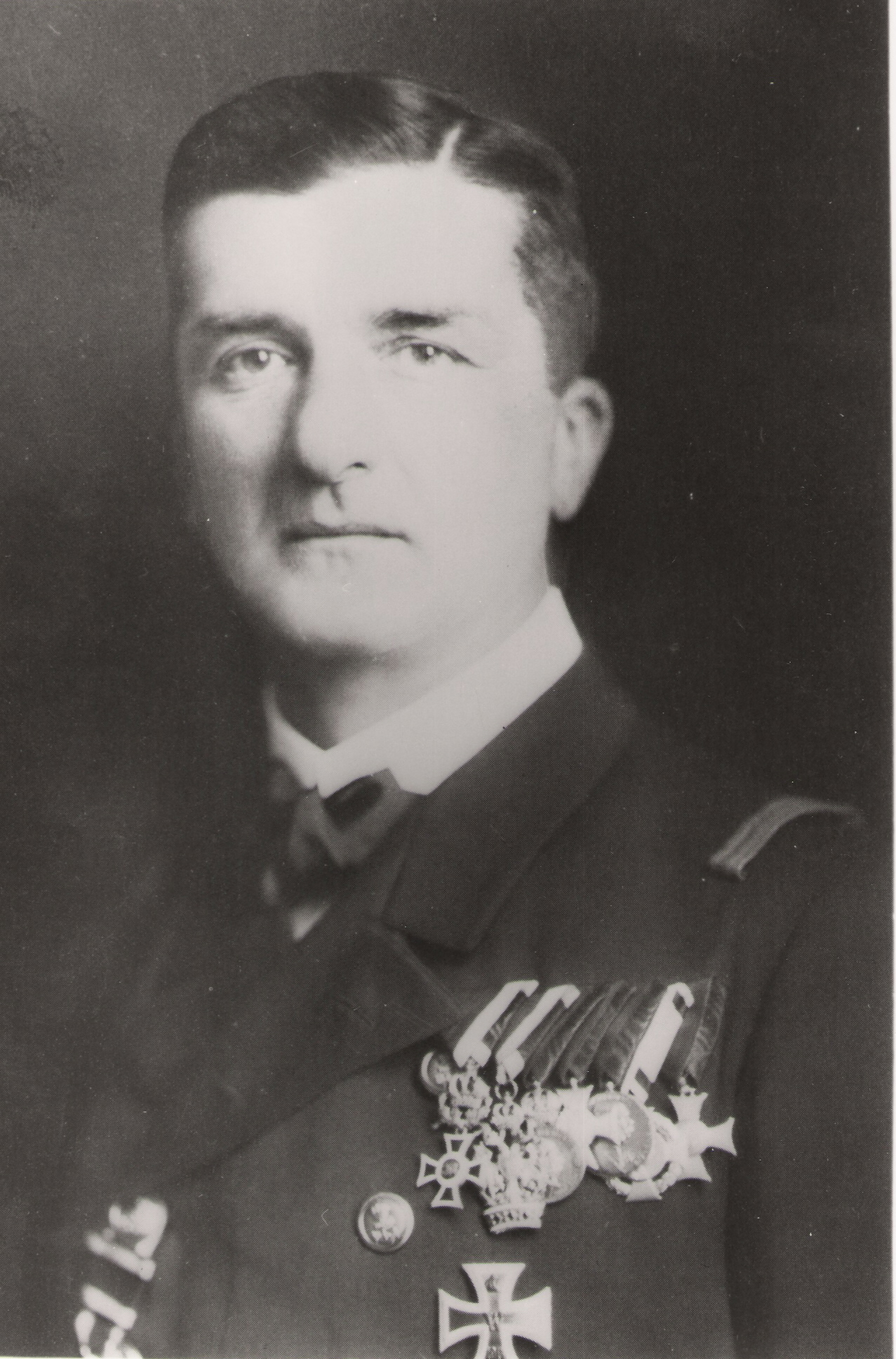
Admiral Horthy

- Admiral Nicholas Horthy was named as the Regent for the vacant throne of the Kingdom of Hungary, in a vote taken by the Hungarian Assembly. The monarchy had been vacant since the surrender of Austria-Hungary in 1918.
- Marinduque, one of the smaller islands in the Philippines, was designated as a separate province by act of the Philippine Congress.
- Prime Minister Karlis Ulmanis of Latvia signed an armistice with the Soviet Union, bringing an end to hostilities between the two nations.
- The largest crowd in the then three year old National Hockey League, 8,500 fans, watched in Toronto's Arena Gardens to see the original Ottawa Senators play the Toronto St. Patricks (now the Maple Leafs).
- Born:
  - Pyotr Dolgov, colonel in the Soviet Air Force and balloonist; in Bogoyavlenskoye, Zemetchinsky District, Penza Oblast, Russian SFSR (present-day Dolgovo, Russia) (d. 1962, killed in space diving decompression accident)
  - Robert S. Johnson, American ace fighter pilot, credited with 27 victories in World War II; in Lawton, Oklahoma, United States (d. 1998)
  - Janet L. Wolff, American advertising executive, key figure at J. Walter Thompson Co. and William Esty Co., inductee into the Advertising Hall of Fame; as Janet Loeb, in San Francisco, United States (d. 2014)
- Died: Afonso, Duke of Porto, 54, the last Prince Royal of Portugal and former heir presumptive to his nephew, King Manuel II, from 1908 until the monarchy was abolished in 1910 (b. 1865)

== February 22, 1920 (Sunday) ==
- In the first standoff between the U.S. government and local level authorities since Prohibition went into effect, the U.S. Bureau of Prohibition, part of the Bureau of Internal Revenue (now the IRS) authorized the sending of prohibition agents to Iron County, Michigan, to suppress what the U.S. media described as a new "Whiskey Rebellion." Major A. V. Dalrymple, in charge of the central states, wired to his superiors at the B.O.P. for permission to have armed enforcement agents to deal with Iron County prosecutor Martin S. McDonough, who had taken seized alcohol back from B.O.P. agents on February 19. The "rebellion" ended with an angry confrontation between Dalrymple and McDonough at a hotel in Iron Mountain, after which Dalrymple and his 16 agents departed without violence.
- Born:
  - George E. Moore, American oncologist, discovered the link between chewing tobacco and mouth cancer; in Minneapolis, United States (d. 2008)
  - Kamal Kapoor, Indian film actor and producer, appeared in over 600 Hindi, Punjabi, and Gujarati films; in Peshawar, British India (present-day Pakistan) (d. 2010)
  - Rocco Borella, Italian avant-garde painter; in Genoa, Kingdom of Italy (present-day Italy) (d. 1994)
  - Leonard F. Mason, American Marine, posthumous Medal of Honor recipient; in Middlesboro, Kentucky, United States (d. 1944)
  - Karl Drews, American major league baseball player, whose career spanned 21 seasons from 1939 to 1959; in Staten Island, New York, United States (d. 1963, killed in car accident)
  - Pedro Junco, Cuban musical composer; in Pinar del Río, Cuba (d. 1943)
- Died: Spencer Leigh Hughes, 61, British politician and journalist; died of a heart aneurysm (b. 1858)

== February 23, 1920 (Monday) ==
- The Soviet Army completed its consolidation of northern Russia by taking control of Murmansk.
- The UK's Secretary of War, Winston Churchill, announced that the British Army would be composed entirely of volunteers with the abolition of military conscription effective March 31. Churchill reported that the British had succeeded in recruiting enough new volunteers to reach 220,000 troops, around the world, with the exception of British India, and that persons who had been drafted would be released from the service by the end of April.
- Born:
  - Alex Kawilarang, Indonesian freedom fighter, founder of special forces unit Kesko TT, now the Kopassus force; in Batavia, Dutch East Indies (present-day Jakarta, Indonesia) (d. 2000)
  - Kung Te-cheng, Taiwanese government official, 77th generation descendant of Confucius, last Duke Yansheng of China (1920 to 1935) and the first Sacrificial Official to Confucius of Taiwan; in Ch'u-Fu, Shantung province, Republic of China) (present-day Qufu, Shandong, China) (d. 2008)
  - Louise Reiss, American pediatrician, coordinated the Baby Tooth Survey which provided evidence that children born in 1963 had absorbed 50 times as much radioactive strontium-90 in their teeth as children born before atmospheric nuclear testing had become widespread in 1950; in Queens, New York City, United States (d. 2011)
  - Anton Antonov-Ovseyenko, Soviet Russian historian and writer, prisoner in a labor camp during the rule of Stalin; in Moscow, Russian SFSR (present-day Russia) (d. 2013)
  - Sri Madhava Ashish, Scottish-born Indian spiritualist, mystic, writer and agriculturist; as Alexander Phipps, in Edinburgh, Scotland (d. 1997)

== February 24, 1920 (Tuesday) ==
Emblem of the DAP

Flag of the NSDAP

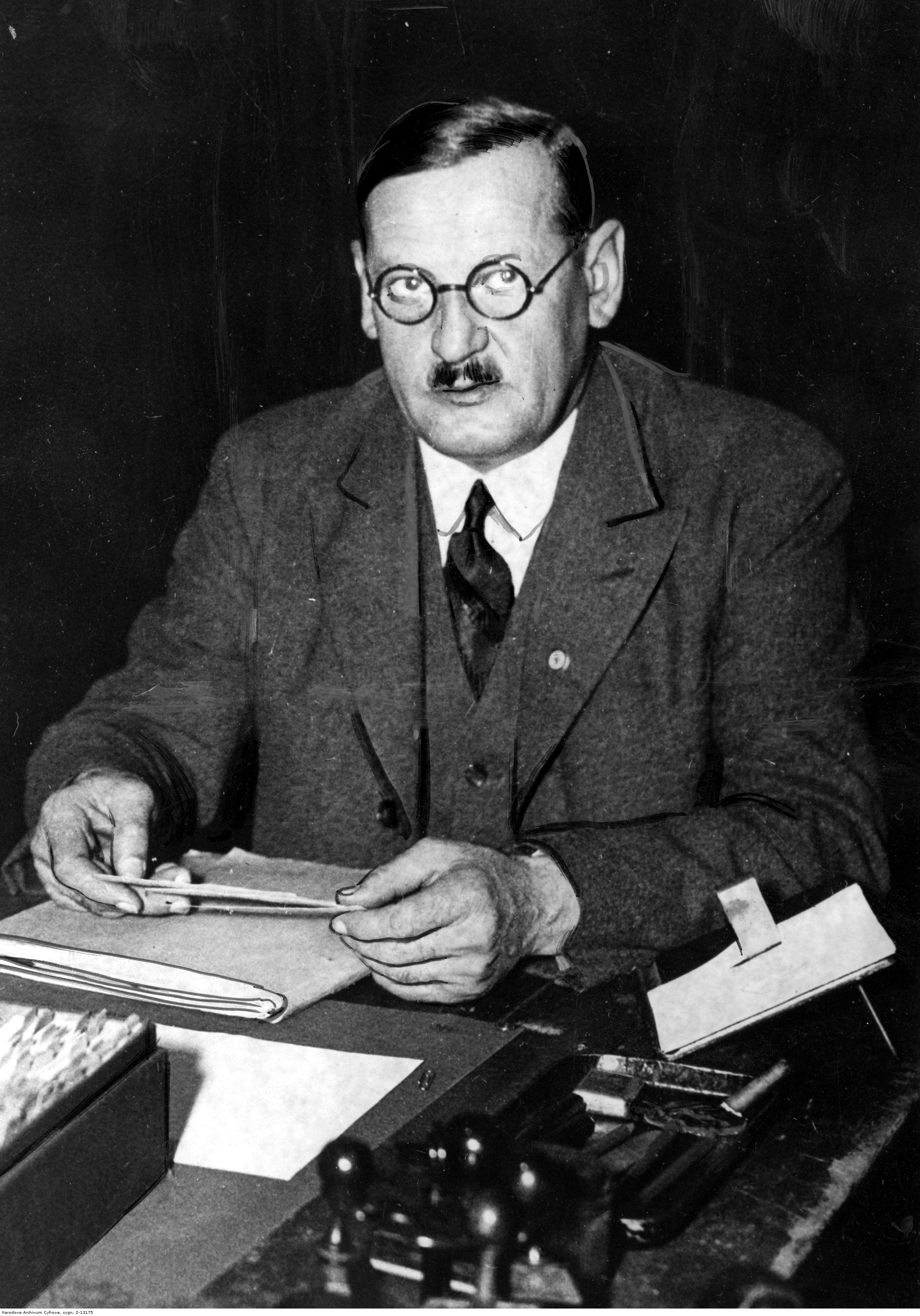
Nazi Party leader Drexler

- The National Socialist German Workers' Party, colloquially known as the Nazi Party, was founded at a meeting at the Staatliches Hofbräuhaus in Munich. With over 2,000 people in attendance, German Workers' Party (DAP) Chairman and founder Anton Drexler introduced Adolf Hitler, who then presented his German nationalist "25-Point Program" that changed the DAP's mission statement, its flag and its name to the new NSDAP. The term "Nazi" derived from the abbreviation for Nationalsozialistische.
- The Dairy Council, which has promoted the consumption of milk in the United Kingdom for over a century, was founded. During its first 63 years of existence, it was called the National Milk Publicity Council.
- The rights to the Encyclopaedia Britannica, published continuously since its founding in Great Britain in 1768, was purchased by American philanthropist Julius Rosenwald, the chief executive officer of Sears, Roebuck and Company.
- Soviet Army general Yakov Tryapitsyn and 4,000 troops entered the city of Nikolayevsk-on-Amur, which had been occupied by the Japanese Army's 14th Infantry Division, a Russian White Army garrison, and 6,000 Russian and Japanese civilians. Outnumbered by 4,000 Soviet troops against the combined Japanese and White Russian force of 650, the Japanese commander allowed the Soviets to enter the city. General Trapitsyn's men then began a roundup of the White Russian troops for execution.
- The League of Nations Supreme Council decided that it would not recognize the Soviet Union as the government of Russia until outrages by the Bolsheviks were halted, but said that the League nations would resume trade with Russia, and that neighboring nations would receive "every possible support" from the League if they were attacked by the Soviets.
- Mathias Erzberger was forced to resign as Germany's Minister of Finance after his financial scandals were revealed in testimony during a lawsuit he had brought against Dr. Karl Helfferich for libel.
- The U.S. state of Maryland rejected the 19th Amendment for women's suffrage nationwide. In 1941, Maryland would become the first of nine southern states to reverse its decision to reject the amendment.
- Born: V. Nanammal, Indian yoga teacher, trained over one million students during her 45-year career; in Coimbatore, Madras Presidency, British India (present-day Tamil Nadu state, India) (d. 2019)
- Died: John Charles Olmsted, 67, American landscape architect (b. 1852)

== February 25, 1920 (Wednesday) ==
- Dr. Anna Weld and Professor Leila Andrews became the first and second women to be admitted into the American College of Physicians.
- Within a month of the beginning of Prohibition, the U.S. House rejected the Igoe proposal to repeal the Volstead Act, which provided for enforcement of the ban against liquor.
- Born:
  - Wladyslaw Machejek, Polish propaganda writer and legislator; in Chodów, Poland (d. 1991)
  - Molly Bobak, Canadian war artist; born as Molly Lamb, in Vancouver, Canada (d. 2014)
- Died: James Gayley, 64, American inventor and metallurgist, credited with improving in the production of steel and iron (b. 1855)

== February 26, 1920 (Thursday) ==
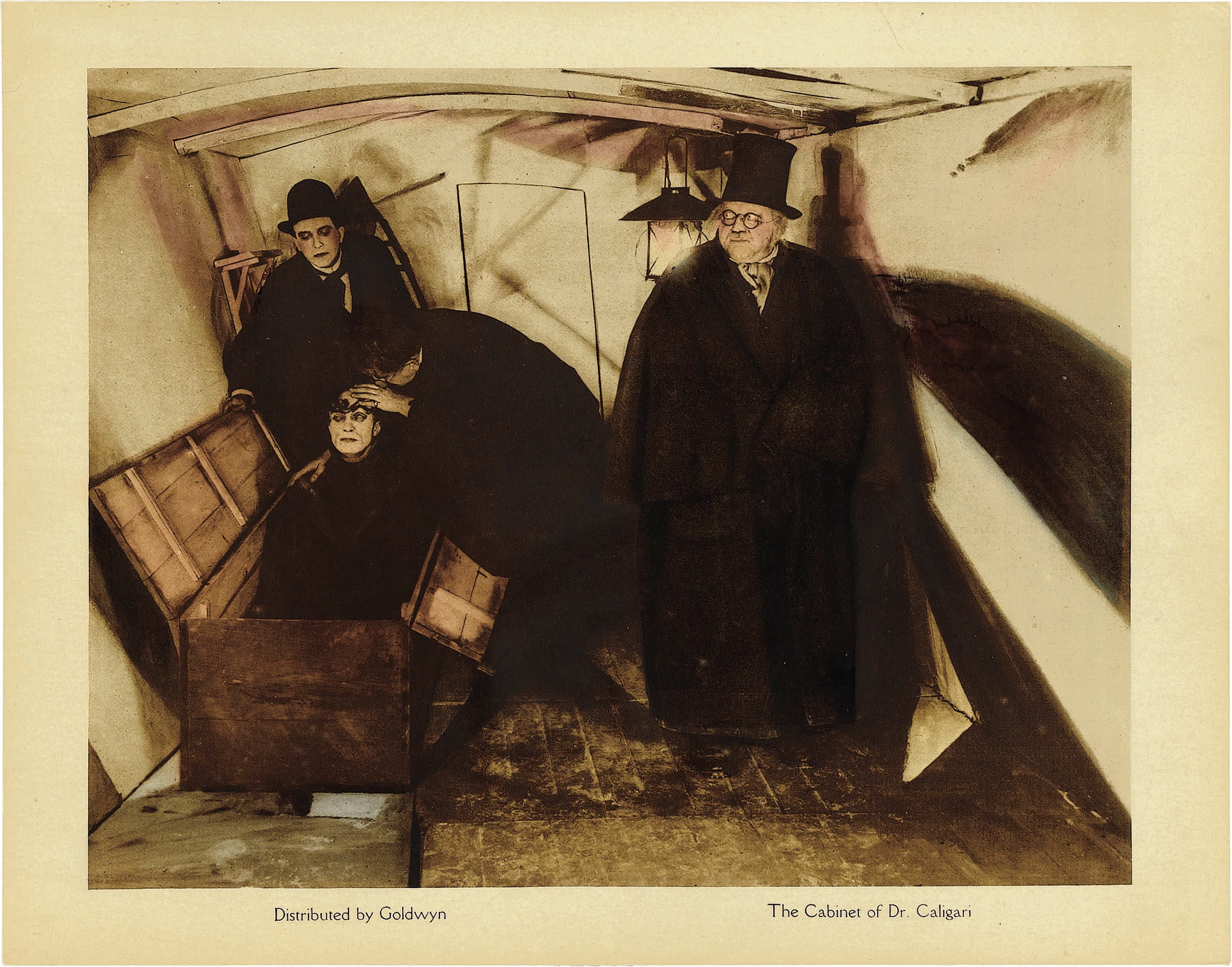
"Dr. Caligari" and crew

- Directed by Robert Wiene, The Cabinet of Dr. Caligari, premiered in German cinemas. The German silent horror movie is considered a classic by film historians and marked the introduction of the film noir style.
- Ontario, the most populous Province of Canada (2.9 million people), presented its first plan for a network of federally funded provincial highways.
- In Lwow, at the time a part of Poland and now Lviv, Ukraine, moved Jan Kazimierz University to its current location, the former legislative building for the Polish Republic. After 1939, when the area was annexed by the Soviet Union into the Ukrainian SSR, the institution was renamed Ivan Franko University and is now the University of Lviv.
- Born:
  - Derek Goodwin, British ornithologist; in Woking, England (d. 2008)
  - José Mauro de Vasconcelos, Brazilian novelist; in Bangu, Brazil (d. 1984)
- Died: Anna Alice Chapin, 39, American novelist (b. 1880)

== February 27, 1920 (Friday) ==
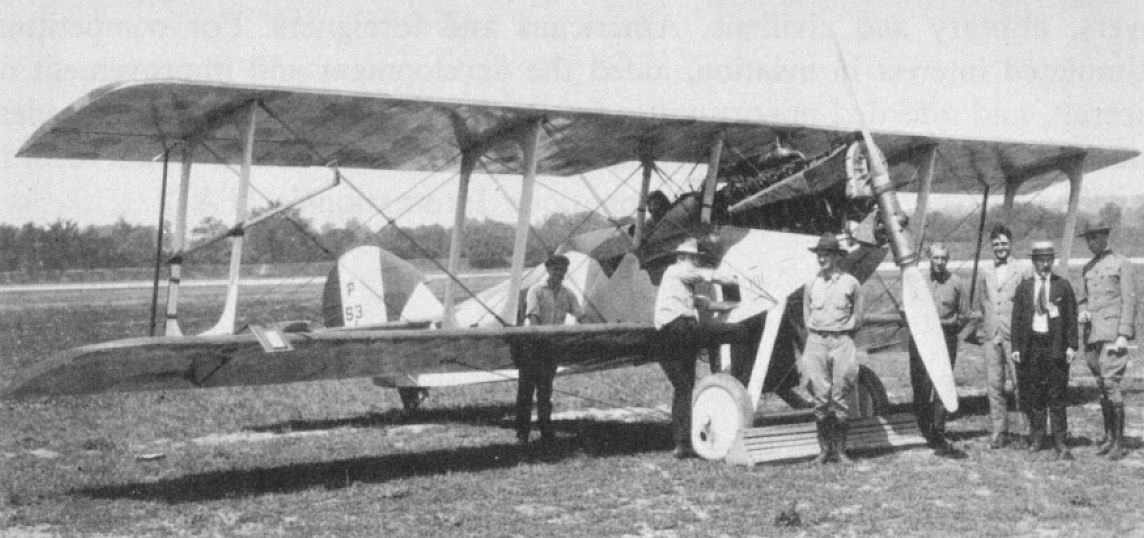
Major Schroeder in his Le Père airplane

- Prime Minister Millerand of France issued an order drafting striking railroad workers into the French Army, after a nationwide walkout had stopped service on three of the nation's five railway lines. The strike ended three days later, on March 1.
- The British government released the text of proposed legislation in the House of Commons providing for Irish Home Rule, with an autonomous government and a dual parliament.
- French troops in Syria, formerly territory of the Ottoman Empire, were forced to retreat from Aleppo after heavy fighting. A French study concluded that at least 20,000 Armenians had been massacred by the Ottoman military.
- U.S. Army Major R. W. Schroeder took off from McCook Field in Dayton, Ohio, and set a new world record for highest altitude obtained by a human being, but lost consciousness after reaching an altitude later determined to be 36,020 feet (10,980 m). His plane fell more than six miles before Schroeder was able to regain control of it 2,000 feet (610 m) before impact. Major Schroeder was trying to reach an altitude of 40,000 feet (12,000 m) in his unpressurized, open cockpit Packard-Le Père plane.

== February 28, 1920 (Saturday) ==
- The patent application for the mass production of silica gel was filed by its inventor, chemistry professor Walter A. Patrick of Johns Hopkins University in Baltimore, under the title "Process of producing gels for catalytic and adsorbent purposes." U.S. Patent No. 1,577,186 was not granted until more than six years later, on March 16, 1926. Silica gel is now widely used in packaging as a means of keeping perishable products dry by removing moisture from the air within the package.
- U.S. President Wilson signed the Esch–Cummins Act, returning control of the nation's railroads to their corporate owners, effective at 12:01 a.m. on March 1. "Thus ends twenty-six months of federal control and operation of the lines," a reporter noted.
- President Wilson also said in a statement to U.S. Senate leaders that if the Senate failed to ratify all of the articles of the Treaty of Versailles, he would decline to sign the ratification bill, exercising the pocket veto of the legislation. At issue was Article 10 of the Treaty.
- Italy began the blockade of the disputed city of Fiume.
- Greece ratified the Treaty of Versailles.
- The Emperor of Japan dissolved the nation's legislature, the Diet, because of disagreements between the Cabinet and the Diet over extended male suffrage. Under the law, new elections were required within five months.
- Mexican bandits crossed the border into the U.S. state of Arizona and killed an American storekeeper at the mining town of Ruby.

== February 29, 1920 (Sunday) ==
- The freighter ship SS Cubadist (a tanker for the Cuba Distilling Company) made its last communication after departing from Havana en route to Baltimore with a cargo of molasses. At that time, it identified its position as 111 nautical miles (206 km; 128 mi) south-southwest of Cape Hatteras, North Carolina. The ship and its crew of 40 were never seen again, and was believed to have been lost in a gale that swept through that area of the Atlantic Ocean.
