= Władysław Machejek =

Polish communist official

- Machejek at his party office, 1967
- Born: February 25, 1920; Chodów, Kielce Voivodeship, Poland
- Died: December 21, 1991 (aged 71); Kraków, Poland
- Citizenship: Polish
- Occupations: Party official, publicist, writer
- Known for: Polish United Workers' Party deputy

Władysław Machejek (February 25, 1920 – December 21, 1991) was a communist official, writer, publicist and hoax artist during the Stalinist period in Poland following World War II. He wrote fabricated accounts of anti-communist underground mainly for his own political gains as regional party secretary and later member of the communist highest parliamentary echelons. Due to the coarse and infamous nature of his works, he has been described as a "legendary socialist scribbler".

== Biography ==
Machejek was born on February 25, 1920, into a peasant family in the hamlet of Chodów. He joined the Communist Party of Poland as a youth. During World War II he served in the Soviet-sponsored partisan organizations Gwardia Ludowa and Armia Ludowa. After the war he became a member of the new Polish communist party PZPR and took over the post of its regional secretary in the town of Nowy Targ not far from where he grew up. Soon, he became a member of the provincial party cell in Kraków, and eventually deputy to the Sejm (Polish parliament) in the People's Republic of Poland. He was selected editor-in-chief of Życie Literackie magazine under Stalinism (1952) and became a prolific writer of ideological propaganda and coarse, often embarrassing polemics supporting the communist party line. He has also been known on occasion to attack the authorities of other communist countries (such as Romania), but his criticism was tolerated. It is said he always carried a bottle of vodka in his hollow briefcase. Machejek died in Kraków at the age of 71 shortly after the collapse of the communist regime in the People's Republic, and the re-emergence of sovereign Polish state in the Autumn of Nations.

== Works ==
Machejek was a political writer. His most infamous book Rano przeszedł huragan (In the Morning There Came A Hurricane) published in 1955 presented purported crimes in the Podhale region committed by the Ogniowcy partisan units under Józef Kuraś. The book was based on a fictional diary of their leader written by Machejek himself. In an often coarse and even primitive prose, Machejek painted Poland's anti-communists as motley crew of bloodthirsty anti-Semites who killed Jews, persecuted the Slovak population of the region and who preyed on innocent people. Although those fragments were simply invented by Machejek, some historians, most recently Jan Tomasz Gross in his Fear: Anti-Semitism in Poland After Auschwitz (2006), have fallen for his claim that the novel was based on facts (Kuraś himself was hunted to death by secret police), thus treating Machejek's falsehood as a valid source.

Polish poet, literary critic and dissident activist Stanisław Barańczak saw Machejek's style as worthy of mention and wrote an essay, U źródeł machejkizmu, published in his 1990 book Książki najgorsze (The Worst of Books). He suggested that Machejek's style was unique enough to merit a special term, machejkizm or machejcyzm. According to Barańczak, Machejek's style was a mixture of the worst elements of socialist (communist) literature, namely coarse language of an uneducated man mixed with the pompous and complex officialese of the Party. Machejek, according to Barańczak, was a master of writing empty sentences, which contain no value, no real message, are not meant to be read, but function simply to fill space.

== Bibliography ==
- Po wojnie (1954)
- Dzwony (1955)
- Zginęli W Walce: Sylwetki Bojowników AL i GL (1957)
- Niespokojny człowiek (1964)
- Z mojego obserwatorium (1969)
- W starym młynie (1971)
- Zawytka (1972)
- Z wojny tej, wojny złej ... (1978)
- Rano przeszedł huragan (In the Morning There Came A Hurricane, 1985 reprint)

== Awards and decorations ==
- Order of the Banner of Labour, 1st Class
- Order of the Banner of Labour, 2nd Class
- Commander's Cross with Star of the Order of Polonia Restituta
- Order of the Cross of Grunwald, 3rd Class
- Officer's Cross of the Order of Polonia Restituta (16 July 1954)(1954)
- Knight's Cross of the Order of Polonia Restituta
- Silver Cross of Virtuti Militari
- Silver Cross of Merit
- Partisan Cross
- Medal of the 10th Anniversary of People's Poland (1955)
- Bronze Medal of Merit for National Defence (1966)
- Badge of the 1000th Anniversary of the Polish State (1966)
