= Hetty Voûte =

Dutch Resistance fighter

Henriëtte Voûte
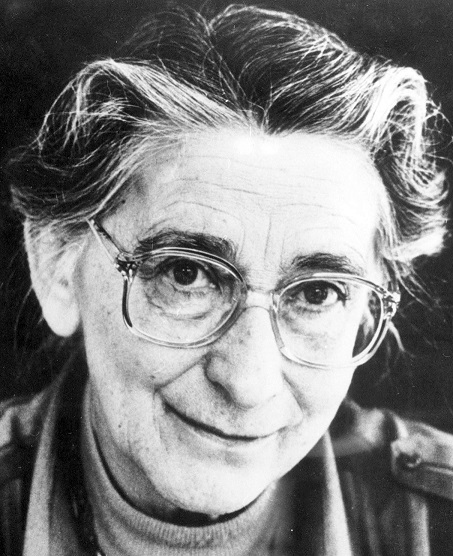
- Born: Henriëtte Voûte; 12 June 1918; Utrecht, Netherlands
- Died: 16 January 1999 (aged 80); Amsterdam, Netherlands
- Other name: Hetty
- Occupation: Dutch Resistance (Utrechts Kindercomité)
- Parent(s): Paul Antoine Voûte, Jr. and Pauline Hermine Elisabeth (Pierson) Voûte
- Relatives: Jan Lodewijk Voûte, Paul Antoine Voûte, Jan Reinier Voûte, Allard Voûte, Nicolaas Gerard Voûte, and Pauline Hermine Elisabeth Voûte
- Awards: Righteous Among the Nations (1988)

Henriëtte ("Hetty") Voûte (12 June 1918 – 16 January 1999) was a Dutch Resistance fighter who was declared Righteous Among the Nations by Yad Vashem on 24 March 1988 for her work rescuing Dutch Jewish children whose parents had been deported to Nazi concentration camps during World War II.

Under increasing scrutiny by Nazi sympathizers, she was forced to go into hiding in February 1943 for personal safety reasons, but resumed her rescue and resistance work within weeks, deeming the lives of the children she was helping as important as, or more important than her own. Arrested in June 1943 for her rescue work as a member of the Utrechts Kindercomité (Utrecht Children’s Committee or UKC), she was incarcerated, and moved from one jail to another until being transferred to the detention camp at Herzogenbusch in Vught. She was then later deported to the Ravensbrück concentration camp in Germany. Surviving until the camp was liberated, she returned home to the Netherlands, married and had children.

== Formative years ==
Born on 12 June 1918 in Utrecht, in the Netherlands, Henriëtte (Hetty) Voûte was the youngest of seven children of Pauline Hermine Elisabeth (Pierson) Voûte (1881–1965) and Paul Antoine Voûte, Jr. (1877–1946), a native of the village of Glowaczow in Poland who had emigrated from Warsaw aboard the M.S. Batory, and had become a factory director in Utrecht. Her siblings were: Jan Lodewijk Voûte (1904–1962), who was also known as “Lodie”; Paul Antoine Voûte (1906–1971); Jan Reinier Voûte (1908–1993); Allard Voûte (1910–1974); Nicolaas Gerard Voûte (1913–1998); and Pauline Hermine Elisabeth Voûte (1916–1979).

After completing her studies at the Stedelijk Gymnasium, she enrolled as a biology major in 1937 at Utrecht University, a state-sponsored academic institution in the Netherlands. It was during this period of her life that she and her family began to hear stories regarding the increase of Antisemitism in Germany. These stories were confirmed by her brother in 1938. An employee of KLM Royal Dutch Airlines who was in Germany for a work assignment in November that year, he had been an eyewitness to the violence perpetrated against Jewish people by supporters of Adolf Hitler as part of Kristallnacht, a pogrom which took place on 9–10 November, during which the Sturmabteilung (the German paramilitary force known more commonly as the "SA") destroyed synagogues and Jewish-owned stores and other buildings, murdered more than 90 Jewish people, and deported 30,000 Jewish men to Nazi concentration camps. That same year, Hetty Voûte became a member of the Red Cross.

== Occupation of the Netherlands and World War II ==
Close to her family, Hetty Voûte opted to live at home while studying biology at Utrecht University since the academic institution was located not far from her parents' house on Kromme Nieuwe Gracht. Her ordered world was upended in 1940, however, when Germany invaded the Netherlands on 10 May and when her nation surrendered after five days of brutal fighting:

At the beginning the Germans were very civil.... They behaved courteously and correctly, and many people thought they were not so bad. Early on, Seyss-Inquart issued a statement that he would respect the laws of the Dutch people as much as possible. That’s why two of my brothers started an underground newspaper. They wrote things like, "Don’t be fooled by them – they say they are here to liberate us, but they are stealing everything out of our shops." Whenever I saw my brothers, their fingers were always black from assembling the news. I learned from those articles what the Nazis were up to, and I decided to throw "the stubborn ounces of my weight" against them....

Her brothers' publication, Bulletin, was in fact the first Dutch Resistance newspaper, according to Yad Vashem. Consequently, Hetty Voûte's first act of resistance was to serve as a courier for her brothers; she delivered their publication to members of the community who were passionate about regaining control of their government.

By autumn 1940 she and a classmate, Olga Hudig, had relocated to the village of Noordwijk in South Holland in order to conduct research as part of the requirements for a university class in marine biology. While obtaining the requisite permission from a local government official to conduct her research (because beach access was restricted by Nazi authorities at this time), she noticed "a very nice map showing the locations of all the anti-aircraft guns on that strip of land," and realized that she could help by alerting members of a local Dutch Resistance cell to the map's contents and location:

I’d take a good look at that map, and then report what I had seen to a boy I knew who had a secret radio transmitter. He would then send the information to British intelligence.

During this time, she and Hudig also helped identify families in and around Noordwijk, who were willing to hide and protect Jewish children from persecution by Nazi officials; they then also began to transport children sent to them by the resistance cell operated by Joop Westerweel.

In response to the persecution and deportation of Jewish men and women from the Netherlands (including the July 1942 mass deportation from Amsterdam to the Auschwitz and Sobibor) concentration camps, she then joined the Utrechts Kindercomité (Utrecht Children’s Committee or UKC), and became involved with child rescue on a significantly larger scale:

The Nazis sealed off a whole block and went running through with their rifles and Doberman dogs shouting, “All Jews out!” We heard how they broke down doors, barged into houses....

Many Jewish people were arrested, but afterwards, there were some children left behind, just wandering the streets. A young woman named Ad Groenendijk went walking through the Jewish Quarter and thought, who is going to care for these little ones? She gathered four or five of them up and brought them to the home of our friend Jan Meulenbelt. His mother immediately said they could stay there until other arrangements were made.

Jan called me up and said we had work to do....

For several months, I’d been helping to find places Jewish children whose parents had to report for “labour assignments.” But this was different: the parents had just been snatched away with no thought given to the children. Very quickly, about ten of us students joined together to try to find hiding places for them....

Sometimes I would fetch two or three children in one day, and deliver them far into the country. By the end of August our group had found hiding places for 140 children.

According to Yad Vashem, just prior to beginning the massive July 1942 action in Amsterdam, Nazi authorities and their Dutch collaborators had designated the Hollandse Schouwberg, a Jewish theater there, as the main holding area for the targeted families. As the round up progressed, children were separated from their parents and moved across the street to "the Crèche – what had been a day care center for the children of mostly Jewish working mothers." The parents were then taken to the Nazi transit camp at Westerbork, and held there until transported by cattle car to a death camp. As soon as they were safely able to make their way into the Crèche, Hetty Voûte and Gisela Wieberdink-Soehnlein, a Utrech University law student, began a series of rescue visits, during which they hid at-risk children in laundry bags, milk cans and potato sacks, smuggled them out of the building, and transported them to UKC support families. Between 1942 and 1943, Voûte and Wieberdink-Soehnlein collaborated with Henriette Pimentel, headmistress of the Crèche, Dr. Johan Van Hulst, director of a nearby teachers’ seminary, and Walter Süskind, and to save 1,000 of the roughly 4,000 at-risk children.

Her brother, Paul Voûte, M.D., a respected physician, also assisted her with her child rescue efforts during this time.

By the summer of 1942, Hetty Voûte was also actively engaged in procuring ration cards for the increasing number of Jewish children being sheltered through the UKC's support network. Among her suppliers was Menachem Pinkhof, one of the Jewish members of the Westerweel group. She then also began traveling throughout the Netherlands to secure additional cards, and built a secure supply network by convincing officials at 12 distribution centers to authorize the issuance of ration cards in conjunction with each UKC child's registration papers. By November 1942, she was in charge of the UKC’s administration, and was responsible for safeguarding the codebook which documented the names and addresses of the Jewish children being hidden by the UKC. She also escorted children to their respective safehouses and, when no hiding places were available, found temporary shelters for children in need. Also participating in this network was Willemiena Bouwman (known as Mien van Trouw), and Bouwman's love interest, Willem Pieter (“Wim”) Speelman, one of the organizers of Trouw ("True" or "Allegiance"), an orthodox Protestant underground newspaper which was published illegally in violation of Nazi laws prohibiting the free operation of independent press outlets

As awareness built of her rescue work, Hetty Voûte came under increasing scrutiny by Dutch and Nazi officials. After nearly being arrested in February 1943, she was forced to temporarily halt her activities and go into hiding, staying with Adrie Knappert in Ommen, Overijssel immediate for several weeks until the immediate danger passed. During the summer of 1943, her luck finally ran out. When she went to the Utrecht train station to retrieve her bicycle on the evening of 12 June, she was arrested there by the Geheime Staatspolizei (the Nazi Secret State Police unit known more commonly as the Gestapo), and sent to jail. Her friend and fellow UKC collaborator, Gisela Wieberdink-Soehnlein, was then also arrested and jailed the next day.

=== Imprisonment at Herzogenbusch and Ravensbrück ===
Following their arrest for their work with the Utrechts Kindercomité, Hetty Voûte and Gisela Wieberdink-Soehnlein were incarcerated, and then moved from one jail to another until being transferred to the Herzogenbusch concentration camp at Vught.

At the camp in Vught, the Germans made us work in a big tire factory in Den Bosch that they had converted to manufacture gas masks. We had to make gas masks from six in the morning until six at night, and I sat at the end of an assembly line and molded the nose onto each mask. From there, the masks went into a vulcanization oven where they would be baked and come out hard. But I dug my nails into the nose-pieces while they were still soft, so that when they came out, nobody would be able to breathe while wearing one! For that I was sentenced to the bunker: the prison within the concentration camp.

During this time, they were also interrogated by the Gestapo, but Voûte never divulged the names of her collaborators or other details of their rescue operation. According to a later interview:

The interrogations were terrible. At times, out of decency, they removed my eyeglasses before slapping me across the face. This in itself did not anger me. It was worse when they were polite, because then I found it harder to remain silent.

Transferred next to Haaren to a Catholic seminary that had been converted into a prison by Nazi officials, they were both subsequently deported to Germany as Allied troops advanced through the Netherlands. Sent to the train station near Ravensbrück, and marched from there to the concentration camp, but were not permitted to enter due to severe overcrowding. The "largest concentration camp for women in the German Reich," according to the United States Holocaust Memorial Museum, Ravensbrück was located roughly 50 miles north of Berlin, and was "second in size only to the women's camp in Auschwitz-Birkenau."

Forced to "sit on a pile of coal for two days and two nights in the rain," said Voûte, they realized once they were finally allowed in that their living conditions would be abysmal. Required to stand for hours during the morning and evening "Appell" as prisoners names were checked against camp rosters, they were often beaten during those reviews. Assigned to a work detail at the Siemens factory, they were given only "watery soup with some cabbage in it" for lunch, "and for dinner, more soup and a piece of hard bread." At night, they slept on "hard mattresses filled with a little fetid straw" in dirty, lice-infested barracks. The conditions then deteriorated further. By 1945, as awareness dawned that Germany would lose the war, the guards stopped feeding the surviving prisoners, and ramped up their mass extermination efforts.

Following negotiations by Swedish diplomat Folke Bernadotte, Hetty Voûte, Gisela Wieberdink-Soehnlein, and other inmates were finally freed from Ravensbrück on 28 April 1945. Given fresh bread and lentil soup by representatives from the International Red Cross, they were also given medical care before being transported by van, train and ferry to Malmö. Initially not permitted to return to the Netherlands due to a severe food shortage there and because she still had not yet fully recovered from the effects of her concentration camp imprisonment, she was hospitalized at Landskrona before being transferred to Lidingö, a sanatorium near Stockholm when physicians discovered she had contracted tuberculosis. She was finally permitted to return home in April 1946.

== Post-war life ==
On 16 December 1946 Hetty Voûte began a new life when she wed Christian Elie Dutilh (1923–1989) in Utrecht. Following their marriage, the couple relocated to the Dutch East Indies, where they greeted the arrival of two sons and two daughters. When Hetty contracted tuberculosis again in 1953, the family returned to the Netherlands, making their home in Amsterdam's Prinses Marijkestraat. She and her husband divorced in 1972. Hetty Voûte then became a biology teacher at the Huishoudschool in Amsterdam, a position she held for eight years. In her later years, she was a resident of Amsterdam who lived "in an elegant apartment on one of the loveliest streets in the city, just a few blocks from the Anne Frank House".

Her parents and siblings also survived the war.

Her brother, Jan Lodewijk Voûte (1904–1962), who was the oldest of the Voûte children, was known by friends and family as "Lodie," and was one of the two Voûte brothers who co-published a Dutch Resistance newspaper during World War II (an activity for which he was ultimately arrested and imprisoned by Nazi officials), went on to become a Dutch diplomat. Assigned to posts in Madrid, Spain; Rio de Janeiro and São Paulo, Brazil; The Hague; and Santiago, Chile, he was appointed as the Netherlands' ambassador to Chile in 1960 – a position he held until his death there from heart disease on 24 October 1962. His remains were returned to the Netherlands for interment at the General Cemetery in Noordwijk on 5 November 1962.

Her brother, Paul Antoine Voûte, M.D. (1906–1971), who had been a respected physician in The Hague at the start of World War II and was imprisoned for helping Hetty Voûte with her child rescue activities during the war, continued to practice medicine, and he and his wife Margaret were declared to be Righteous Among the Nations by Yad Vashem on 28 March 2012.

Jan Reinier Voûte (1908–1993), the third of the Voûte children, had been a lawyer with Amsterdam firm of Loeff and Van der Ploeg, Lawyers & Notaries prior to the war, went on to serve as a member of the Provincial States of North Holland from 1966 to 1980, and as a member of the Senate of the States General from 1976 to 1980. Chairman of the foundation supporting Amsterdam's Rembrandt House Museum, he also founded and chaired the Dutch-Indonesia Society, and was knighted on 21 September 1978 as an officer in the Order of Orange-Nassau.

== Death ==
Henriëtte (Hetty) Voûte died in Amsterdam, the Netherlands on 16 January 1999.

== Awards ==
On 24 March 1988 she was declared to be Righteous Among the Nations by Yad Vashem, and a tree was planted in her honour in The Garden of the Righteous Among the Nations on the Mount of Remembrance in Jerusalem. During her address at the tree planting ceremony, she noted:

As a young girl we would enter an unknown home of unknown people. We would not mention our name, but the parents would confide their children to us....

That was 46 years ago. These children are today men and women about 50 years of age, and a number of them have played roles in the construction and defense of the state.

We would not have been able to do this alone.... Each one of these people helped in searching for addresses where children could disappear, in transporting them, and supplying ration cards....

== External resources ==
- Johan Gerard and Wilhelmina Dora Westerweel (profile of Dutch Resistance fighter "Joop" Westerweel). Jerusalem, Israel: Yad Vashem.
- Oral history interview with Ruth Lavie-Jourgrau, Hetty Voute, and Miriam Pinkhof Waterman (Accession Number: 2009.156.19 | RG Number: RG-50.591.0019). Washington, D.C.: United States Holocaust Memorial Museum, May 31, 1996.
- Ravensbrück, in "Holocaust Encyclopedia." Washington, D.C.: United States Holocaust Memorial Museum.
- The Righteous Among the Nations (background information and database of names). Jerusalem, Israel: Yad Vashem.
- Testimony of Hetty Voûte. Los Angeles, California: Visual History Archive, USC Shoah Foundation.
