= Jagdish Chandra Kapur =

Social scientist

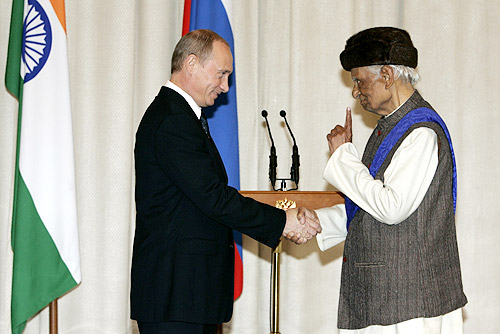
- Born: 16 February 1920; India
- Died: 19 November 2010 (aged 90)
- Occupations: Entrepreneur, social scientist
- Awards: Padma Bhushan

Jagdish Chandra Kapur (February 16, 1920 - November 19, 2010) was an Indian social scientist, entrepreneur and the founder of Kapur Surya Foundation and Kapur Solar Farms. He was also the Editor of World Affairs Journal, a publication aiming at and providing a platform for better interaction between the developed and the developing nations. The Government of India honoured him in 2010, with the Padma Bhushan, the third-highest civilian award, for his services to the fields of science and technology.

== Life sketch ==
Jagdish Chandra Kapur was a towering figure in reconfiguring the new world order, a major public intellectual in Asia, and a source of inspiration for us, wrote Tu Weiming, about Jagdish Chandra Kapur on hearing the news of his death, I cherished his willingness to share his broad vision with me. I look forward to an opportunity to continue his seminal work on intercivilizational dialogue in Cultural China.

Jagdish Chandra Kapur was born on 16 February 1920. He did his graduate studies at the Punjab University and secured his master's degree from the Indian Institute of Science in Bangalore. Later, he went to the United States and had higher studies at the Cornell University at Ithaca, New York.

Kapur's activities are largely centred on the four institutions he has helped found viz. the World Public Forum, World Affairs journal, Kapur Foundation and Kapur Solar Farms and the social activities such as organising seminars and delivering keynote addresses on topics such as science and technology, urban and rural development and future of mankind.

The World Public Forum is a consultative body which serves as a platform for various non-governmental organisations (NGO), public, academic, cultural, spiritual, social and business institutions for exchange of views and ideas on global problems and their resolutions. Dialogue of Civilizations or Rhodes Forum is one such initiative by WPF. WPF was founded by Jagdish Kapur, along with Vladimir Yakunin, former President of the Russian Railways and has participation from many known personalities such as Alfred Gusenbauer, Federal Chancellor of Austria, Fred Dallmayr, Professor of Notre Dame University, Nicholas Papanicolaou, president of Titan Corporation, Greece, Walter Schwimmer, former Secretary-General of the Council of Europe and Hans Koechler, Director of Research Emeritus at the Centre National de la Recherche Scientifique of France Henri Favre.

Surya Foundation, a non-governmental organisation and its sister concern, Surya Solar Farms, are founded by Kapur and focus on research on renewable energy such as solar energy and putting them to practical uses. The Foundation, apart from publishing journals on quarterly intervals, organises meetings and seminars on the subject. It is also involved in charitable activities in the areas of health and education.

Kapur's efforts on dissemination information and knowledge on renewable energy and the future of mankind are effected mainly through the journal, the World Affairs: The Journal of International Issues. It attempts to take the views of the developing nations into the notice of the developed nations and thereby attempt to bridge the gap of information flow between them. The readers of the journal include politicians, academics, leaders and the general public.

Jagdish Chandra Kapur died on 19 November 2010, aged 90, due to age related illnesses.

== Awards and recognitions ==
- Padma Bhushan – 2010
- Kanpur Municipal Corporation has honoured Jagdish Chandra Kapur by naming a road after him, stretching from Vijay Nagar to Sastri Nagar.

== Writings ==
- Jagdish Chandra Kapur (1982). India, an uncommitted society. Vikas. p. 229. ISBN 9780706918786.
- Jagdish Chandra Kapur (September 1947). A Design for a Cold Storage Plant to Store One Thousand Tons of Mangoes and Also a Ten Ton Ice Plant. Cornell University. p. 132.
- Jagdish Chandra Kapur (2005). Our Future: Consumerism Or Humanism. Kapur Surya Foundation. p. 297. ASIN B002Q3QW6A.
- Jagdish Chandra Kapur (1975). "India in the Year 2000". India International Centre Quarterly. 2 (1). Publications Division, India International Centre: 3–12. JSTOR 23001718.
- Jagdish Chandra Kapur and Martin Boodhoo (1979). Public enterprise management : a select bibliography. London: Commonwealth Secretariat. p. 61. ASIN B0007AWC9U.
- The Human Condition Today: Some New Perspectives. Clarion Books. 1988. ISBN 9788185120294.

He has also published more than 50 papers and articles on the subject of the future of mankind.
