= Adolfo Pérez Zelaschi =

Argentine writer

Adolfo Pérez Zelaschi (15 February 1920 – 6 March 2005) was an Argentine writer. He was born in San Carlos de Bolivar on 15 February 1920 and died in Buenos Aires on 6 March 2005. He was a member of the Academia Argentina de Letras (Argentine Academy of Arts).

== Career ==
At age 20, he moved to Buenos Aires, and developed an interest in legal studies, literature and sociology. In his prolific literary works, the following stories stand out: Hombres sobre la pampa (1941), Más allá de los espejos (1949), De los pequeños y los últimos (1976), El barón polaco (1985) and Cien cuentos para cien días (1998).

He is recognized for his works in the detective genre, although he once said: "It's not my fault but the anthologies. Not even 15% of my production is detective."

Perez Zelaschi claimed that his stories were not characterized by horrendous crimes or harmful scenes, but "crimes were peaceful for the weekend, although if someone checks my library they will find, among other things, two or three that deal with toxicology, as many on firearms and some more about forensics."

== Works ==
- 1931 Los Montiel (novel) – The Montiels.
- 1941 Hombres sobre la pampa (story) – Men on the plain.
- 1944 Cantos de labrador y marinero (poetry) – Songs of farmer and sailor.
- 1949 Más allá de los espejos (story) – Beyond the Mirror.
- 1954 El terraplén (novel) – The embankment.
- 1966 El caso de la muerte que telefonea (detective novel) – The case of the death that telephoned.
- 1969 Presidente en la mira (novel) – President in sight.
- 1975 Canto fragmentario de Newpolis (poetry) – Fragmentary Song of Newpolis.
- 1976 De los pequeños y los últimos (story) – From the smallest and the latest.
- 1981 Divertimento para revólver y piano (detective novel) – Amusement for revolver and piano.
- 1981 Nicolasito (novel)
- 1982 La ciudad (novel) – The City.
- 1985 El barón polaco (story) – The Polish Baron.
- 1989 Mis mejores cuentos policiales (anthology of stories) – My best detective stories.
- 1998 Cien cuentos para cien días (story) – A hundred stories for one hundred days.

His poems and stories were collected in anthologies appearing in his native country and in foreign countries such as Chile, Mexico and Belgium.

== Awards ==
- 1949 Argentina Book Chamber Award.
- 1954 Emecé Literary Award (for "The embankment").
- 1954–1957 Province of Buenos Aires Triennial.
- 1960 Clarín Newspaper Award.
- 1976 First Prize of the National Endowment for the Arts for story.
- 1977 Antonio Machado Prize for Short Stories, sponsored by RENFE.
