= SS Cubadist =

Steam ship (1915–1920)

History

United States
- Name: Cubadist
- Owner: Cuba Distilling Co.
- Builder: Fore River Shipbuilding Co., Quincy
- Yard number: 247
- Laid down: 24 August 1915
- Launched: 8 April 1916
- Sponsored by: Miss Lucy Pettengill Currier
- Commissioned: 26 May 1916
- Maiden voyage: 28 May 1916
- Home port: New York
- Identification: US Official Number 214053; Call sign LFWV
- Fate: Disappeared, February 1920

General characteristics
- Type: Tanker
- Tonnage: 5,788 GRT; 3,606 NRT; 8,190 DWT
- Length: 389 ft 0 in (118.57 m)
- Beam: 54 ft 7 in (16.64 m)
- Depth: 29 ft 3 in (8.92 m)
- Installed power: 488 Nhp, 2,400 ihp
- Propulsion: Fore River Shipbuilding Corp. 3-cylinder triple expansion
- Speed: 10 1/2 knots (12.1 mph; 19.4 km/h)

Cubadist was a steam tank ship built in 1915–16 by Fore River Shipbuilding Company of Quincy for the Cuba Distilling Company of New York. The vessel was extensively employed on East Coast to Cuba route during her career and disappeared without a trace on one of her regular trips in February 1920.

== Design and construction ==
Cuba Distilling Company of New York was founded in 1907 to process and utilize molasses, the main by-product of sugar refining which was left unused until then. The company intended to transport blackstrap molasses to the United States where it would be used to produce cattle feed, vinegar and technical alcohol. Early in 1915 in light of their rapidly increasing business, Cuba Distilling decided to enlarge their fleet operating between their sugar plantations in the West Indies and the ports on the East Coast of the United States and an order was placed with Fore River Shipbuilding Corporation for three steam tankers of approximately 8,000 tons deadweight.

Cubadist was the first vessel on that order and was laid down on 24 August 1915 at the builder's shipyard and launched on 8 April 1916 (yard number 247), with Miss Lucy Pettengill Currier, 16-year-old daughter of Hon. Guy W. Currier of Boston, being the sponsor.

The ship had two main decks with a top gallant forecastle, long poop deck and short bridge and had her machinery located aft. The tanker was built on the transverse system, had her hold subdivided into eleven oiltight, two watertight and two non-watertight bulkheads and also had nine cargo tanks. The vessel was designed by the shipyard's naval architects to accommodate the owners requirements for the ship being able to carry both petroleum and molasses in bulk. Because of the difference in density between molasses and oil, different set of tanks were to be used depending on the type of cargo being carried. The total capacity of the main and double bottom tanks was 2,342,500 and 382,000 gallons, respectively. The pump room was located amidships and contained both main cargo pump, and an auxiliary ballast pump that could have been used to handle oil cargo independently of the main pump. The tanker was also equipped with wireless apparatus located in the bridge house, had submarine signal system installed and had electrical lights installed along the decks.

As built, the ship was 389 feet 0 inches (118.57 m) long (between perpendiculars) and 54 feet 7 inches (16.64 m) abeam, a depth of 29 feet 3 inches (8.92 m). Cubadist was originally assessed at 5,788 GRT and 3,606 NRT and had deadweight of approximately 8,120. The vessel had a steel hull with double bottom throughout, and a single 488 Nhp (2,400 ihp) vertical triple expansion steam engine, with cylinders of 25-inch (64 cm), 41-inch (100 cm) and 68-inch (170 cm) diameter with a 48-inch (120 cm) stroke, that drove a single screw propeller and moved the ship at up to 10 1/2 knots (12.1 mph; 19.4 km/h). The steam for the engine was supplied by three single-ended Scotch marine boilers fitted for both coal and oil fuel.

The tanker was delivered to her owner on 26 May 1916 and was put into Boston Navy Yard drydock for cleaning and painting.

== Operational history ==
After final touches were applied at the Navy Yard, Cubadist was immediately pressed into service and left Boston on 28 May 1916 in ballast for Cuba. There she loaded 1,800,000 gallons of molasses and sailed out from Matanzas on June 5 reaching Boston on June 10 being somewhat delayed en-route by the gale and fog. At the time, her cargo was one of the largest to be delivered to Boston and was going to be used to distill industrial alcohol needed in production of smokeless powder. During June and July 1916 the tanker made several more trips to Cuba transporting molasses to ports on the East Coast such as Baltimore and Boston. In August she was reassigned to carry petroleum and oil from Port Arthur and Mexican oilfields in Túxpan and Puerto Lobos to Philadelphia and remained in that role through an early part of 1917. For example, she brought a full cargo of oil from Mexico to Philadelphia on 8 February 1917.

In October 1917 following United States entry into World War I, Cubadist together with many other vessels over 2,500 tons capacity was requisitioned by the United States Shipping Board for service with their Emergency Fleet Corporation. The tanker remained employed on her regular routes under her current owners until December 1917, when she was chartered to work as an auxiliary oiler. Cubadist remained chartered to EFC until February 1918 when she was returned to her owners. As part of her EFC service, she, for example, brought fuel oil to Bermuda in February 1918 to replenish British cruiser Caesar during the latter's stay at Camber.

Following the end of hostilities the tanker was released by the EFC and returned to her regular schedule. Cubadist spent 1919 largely in molasses trade but also made several voyages to Mexican ports of Puerto Lobos and Tuxpan to bring oil to Philadelphia and Baltimore. For example, on 14 November 1919 she arrived at Baltimore with 55,000 barrels of Mexican oil and immediately left for Puerto Rico port of Guánica. On one of her usual trips from Cuba with a cargo of molasses she went aground when entering Delaware River near Reedy Island but was able to refloat herself and get to her destination.

=== Fate ===
Cubadist cleared out from New Orleans on her last voyage on 20 February 1920 bound for Havana. The tanker was under command of captain Harry L. Michelson and had a crew of thirty nine. Upon arrival in Cuba, the vessel loaded her usual cargo of approximately 1,600,000 gallons of molasses and departed Havana on February 26 bound for Baltimore. On February 29 the ship reported her position as being about 111 nautical miles (206 km) south-southwest of Diamond Shoals Lightship and that she were to reach Baltimore on March 2. There were no further communications coming from the vessel, and the tanker never arrived at her destination. As a storm developed later in the day in an approximately the same area as the last reported position of Cubadist, it was believed that the tanker broke in two and sank rapidly during the gale similarly to her sister ship Mielero a month earlier. On March 15 steamer Lake Elizabeth observed small pieces of wreckage in the water approximately 50 miles northeast from Diamond Shoals consisting of mattresses, wooden parts of bridge and fire bucket, however, no positive identification could have been made about the name of the vessel these things came from.
