= USS LeRay Wilson =

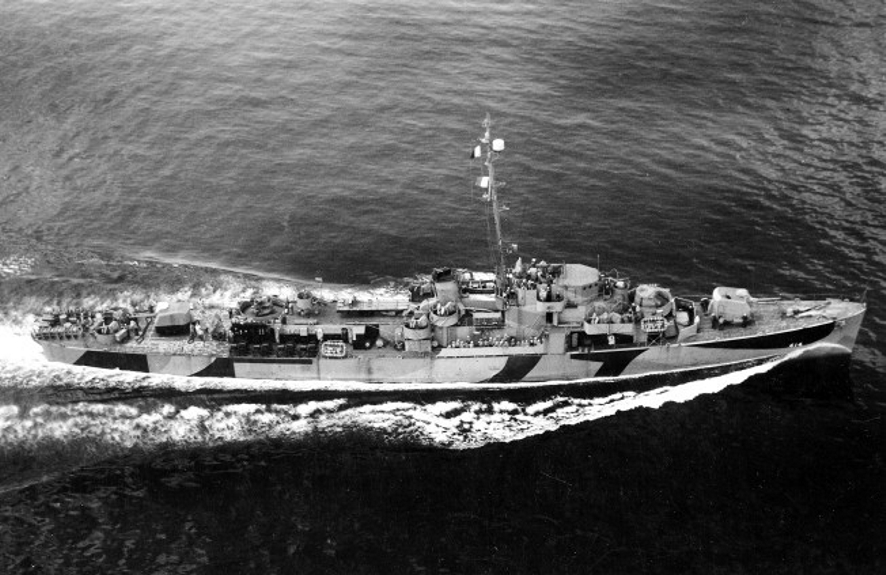
- LeRay Wilson underway on 4 July 1944

History

United States
- Name: LeRay Wilson
- Namesake: LeRay Wilson
- Builder: Brown Shipbuilding, Houston, Texas
- Laid down: 20 December 1943
- Launched: 28 January 1944
- Commissioned: 10 May 1944
- Decommissioned: 15 January 1947
- Recommissioned: 28 March 1951
- Decommissioned: 30 January 1959
- Stricken: 15 May 1972
- Identification: DE-414
- Fate: Sold for scrap 14 September 1973

General characteristics
- Class & type: John C. Butler-class destroyer escort
- Displacement: 1,350 long tons (1,372 t)
- Length: 306 ft (93 m)
- Beam: 36 ft 8 in (11.18 m)
- Draft: 9 ft 5 in (2.87 m)
- Propulsion: 2 boilers, 2 geared turbine engines, 12,000 shp (8,900 kW); 2 propellers
- Speed: 24 knots (44 km/h; 28 mph)
- Range: 6,000 nmi (11,000 km; 6,900 mi) at 12 kn (22 km/h; 14 mph)
- Complement: 14 officers, 201 enlisted
- Armament: 2 × single 5 in (127 mm) guns; 2 × twin 40 mm (1.6 in) AA guns; 10 × single 20 mm (0.79 in) AA guns; 1 × triple 21 in (533 mm) torpedo tubes; 8 × depth charge throwers; 1 × Hedgehog ASW mortar; 2 × depth charge racks

USS LeRay Wilson (DE-414) was a John C. Butler-class destroyer escort acquired by the U.S. Navy during World War II. The primary purpose of the destroyer escort was to escort and protect ships in convoy, in addition to other tasks as assigned, such as patrol or radar picket. Post-war she returned home with four battle stars to her credit.

== Namesake ==
LeRay Wilson was born on 4 February 1920 at Cove, Oregon. He enlisted in the United States Navy on 8 February 1939. Assigned to the USS William B. Preston on 14 June 1940, Wilson was on the seaplane tender in Malalog Bay in the Philippines when the Japanese attacked American ships there on the morning of 8 December 1941. He remained on the ship throughout the succeeding months while American ships fought to hold back the enemy advance toward Australia.

Japanese bombers caught up with the William B. Preston at Darwin Australia on 19 February 1942. Despite the rapidity with which the attack developed and the very obvious danger of being trapped by an explosion, Wilson went immediately below decks and had just completed closing all doors and hatches when a bomb hitting within a few feet of him caused his death. He was posthumously awarded the Silver Star.

== Construction and commissioning ==
The ship's keel was laid down on 20 December 1943 by Brown Shipbuilding Co. at their yard in Houston, Texas. LeRay Wilson was launched on 28 January 1944; sponsored by Mrs. Julia Wilson, mother of LeRay Wilson and commissioned on 10 May 1944.

== History ==
=== World War II ===
After shakedown off Bermuda, the new destroyer escort departed Boston, Massachusetts, 15 July 1944 for the Pacific war zone. With calls at San Diego, California, Pearl Harbor, and Eniwetok, LeRay Wilson arrived at Manus in Admiralty Islands, as the Navy prepared for the invasion of the Philippines. Departing 12 October, she escorted Task Force 77.4.2 to Leyte, arriving 18 October. For the next 12 days, the destroyer escort remained on station screening Rear Admiral Felix Stump's escort carriers while they repelled the attacking Japanese fleet and provided air cover for the landings. The ship arrived at Manus on 3 November and returned to the battle from 20 to 28 November, escorting more carriers to provide air cover for the enemy-infested convoy lanes east and southeast of Leyte.

With Leyte secured, the destroyer escort immediately became involved in the Lingayen Gulf operation. While on antisubmarine patrol near the western entrance to Lingayen Gulf on 10 January 1945, LeRay Wilson underwent Japanese kamikaze attacks. Spotting an enemy two-engine bomber dead ahead about 25 feet (7.6 m) off the water, the ship's gunners maintained continuous gunfire, diverting the aircraft enough to save the ship. As the plane splashed, its starboard wing crashed the ship's port side, killing six gunners, seriously wounding seven more, and causing extensive damage. LeRay Wilson continued patrolling until relieved later the same day, then steamed for Manus. In his battle report Lt. Comdr. M. V. Carson, commanding officer, wrote of the crew: "I say that those men made naval tradition. May their gallant acts live always in the memory of a grateful nation....They were my shipmates and I am proud of them".

During February and March 1945, the ship repaired its port side and prepared for the largest operations of the Pacific war, the capture and occupation of Okinawa. During April, she escorted two convoys of supply ships from Saipan to Okinawa. On 1 May LeRay Wilson began antisubmarine and antiaircraft screening duties off Okinawa. On 26 May she detected and made runs on a midget submarine. Two days later, quick action from the destroyer escort splashed an enemy kamikaze before it could crash into a sister ship. She departed Okinawa on 16 June and arrived Ulithi on 26 June.

For the remainder of the war, LeRay Wilson supported the strikes on the Japanese homeland, escorting oilers and other logistics ships to rendezvous with Admiral William Halsey's 3rd Fleet in the East China Sea. After the Surrender of Japan, she steamed to Tokyo Bay for occupation duty.

The ship departed Tokyo Bay 12 October for Okinawa en route to duty along the coast of China, remaining there until she sailed 26 December for San Francisco, California, arriving 16 January 1946 and joining the Pacific Reserve Fleet. LeRay Wilson decommissioned on 15 January 1947.

=== Korean War and fate ===
With the advent of the Korean War and the need for more fighting ships, LeRay Wilson recommissioned on 28 March 1951. After 2 1/2 years of training and patrol duty between the U.S. West Coast and Pearl Harbor, the ship departed Pearl Harbor on 27 August 1954 for the first of four WestPac cruises. LeRay Wilson continued these missions to the Far East until she decommissioned at San Diego on 30 January 1959 and reentered the Pacific Reserve Fleet. On 15 May 1972 she was struck from the Navy list, and, on 14 September 1973, she was sold for scrap and broken up.

== Awards ==
LeRay Wilson received four battle stars for World War II service.
