= Leila Andrews =

American physician (1876–1954)

Leila Edna Andrews (August 14, 1876 – April 28, 1954) was an American physician who was one of the first two female members of the American College of Physicians (ACP). Andrews was born in North Manchester, Indiana and received her medical degree in 1900 at Northwestern University. She began a practice in her hometown but relocated to Oklahoma City in 1908. She became an instructor in pediatrics at the University of Oklahoma College of Medicine in 1910; in 1915, she became an associate professor at the school, a position she held until 1925. In 1920, Andrews and Anna Weld of Illinois became the first two women elected to the American College of Physicians (ACP). Andrews later practiced hematology at Oklahoma City's St. Anthony Hospital.

== Early life ==
Andrews was born August 14, 1876, to John Smith and Elizabeth Strasbaugh Andrews in North Manchester, Indiana. She attended public school in North Manchester then went to Northwestern University for her medical education, where she received her doctoral (M.D.) in 1900. After graduating, she opened a practice in North Manchester, where she worked until 1908.

== Career in Oklahoma ==
Andrews moved to the new state of Oklahoma, where she reportedly settled in Oklahoma City. In 1910, she was hired by the University of Oklahoma School of Medicine as an instructor in pediatrics. (Note: OU had been established in Norman in 1890, but the School of Medicine was established there in 1908. In 1910, the medical school moved from Norman to Oklahoma City. Thus, she could have been considered as part of the original medical school faculty.) She became an associate professor of medicine in 1915 and served in that position until 1925.

The Journal of the American Institute of Homeopathy reported that professor Leila Andrews of the University of Oklahoma and Anna Weld of Rockford, Illinois were part of a group of two hundred physicians that were named "Fellow of the American College of Physicians" at the fourth annual meeting of the American Congress of Internal Medicine in February 1920. They were the first two women to become members of the ACP. Andrews was accepted into this organization in recognition of her work treating diseases of the blood. In 1938, Andrews was one of ten Oklahoma women to be honored by the national Federation of Business and Professional Women.

Andrews filled various medical positions over the years she practiced. Besides serving on the University of Oklahoma's Medical School faculty, Andrews worked at St. Anthony's, Wesley, and University hospitals. In addition to these positions, Dr. Andrews had a general practice as well, in which she treated mostly women and children.

Andrews practiced medicine in Oklahoma City until her retirement in 1950.

== Life outside of medicine ==
During her time at Northwestern, Andrews became a member of Alpha Epsilon Iota, a chapter of a national women's medical organization that began there in 1898. She proceeded to start a chapter in Oklahoma and served as the organization's national president from 1923 to 1925.

During World War I, in addition to serving on a variety of relief committees, Andrews served as the state chairman for Oklahoma of the Women's Liberty Loan committee as well. This committee raised $3,791,850 in two weeks for the war effort. Andrews was also involved with the Daughters of the American Revolution, being a descendant of John Andrews, who enlisted in the Third Connecticut Regiment in 1777. With this organization, she hosted several meetings and luncheons for fellow members.

== After retirement ==
Andrews remained in Oklahoma City after her retirement. She died in her home four years later, on April 28, 1954, at the age of 77.
