= George E. Moore =

American physician (1920–2008)

- Born: February 22, 1920; Minneapolis, US
- Died: May 19, 2008 (aged 88); Evergreen, Colorado, US
- Education: University of Minnesota
- Occupations: Medical doctor, cancer researcher
- Known for: Discovery of link between chewing tobacco and mouth cancer
- Medical career
- Institutions: Roswell Park Comprehensive Cancer Center, University of Colorado

George Eugene Moore (February 22, 1920 – May 19, 2008) was an American doctor and cancer researcher notable for his discovery of the link between chewing tobacco and mouth cancer. He was head of Roswell Park Comprehensive Cancer Center in Buffalo, New York. He was the author of two books and more than 700 papers.

== Biography ==
Moore was born in Minneapolis. He attended the University of Minnesota where he earned his medical degree and a doctorate of surgery. As a 26-year-old intern at the university he pioneered the use fluorescent and radioactive materials to find and diagnose brain tumors. In 1950 he was awarded the Samuel D. Gross Prize, given every five years by the Philadelphia Academy of Surgery for the best original research in surgery by an American citizen. From 1952 to 1973 he was the director of the Roswell Park Comprehensive Cancer Center, during which time he greatly expanded the institution's facilities and faculty. He met his wife Lorraine P. Hammell while hitchhiking; they were married on February 22, 1945.

In 1954, with colleagues from the Institute and the University of Minnesota, he published a study of male patients with mouth cancer in which he reported that the majority of patients had been tobacco chewers thus establishing a link between tobacco and cancer. They also found that chewers often exhibited a condition known as leukoplakia (irritation of the gums as well as mouth lesions). This study was used as keystone evidence in the American Cancer Society's case against tobacco.

He left the institute in 1967 when he was appointed director of public health research in New York City. In 1973 he moved to Denver to become professor of surgery and microbiology at the University of Colorado.

He had a multitude of interests aside from medicine as well. He was also interested in geology and was the president of the Colorado Mineral Society.

He died of bladder cancer in Evergreen, Colorado, at the age of 88. He lived in Conifer, Colorado
