= Willemiena Bouwman =

Dutch resistance member (1920–2007)

Willemiena Vooren-Bouwman
- Born: Willemiena Bouwman; 5 February 1920; Gees, Drenthe, Netherlands
- Died: 3 March 2007 (aged 87); Bennebroek, North Holland, Netherlands
- Other names: Wilhelmina Vooren; Mien van Trouw (Resistance alias)
- Occupation: Dutch Resistance Member
- Spouse(s): Gerrit Dijkstra, Henk Vooren
- Parent: Rev. J. J. Bouwman
- Awards: Righteous Among the Nations (1992)

Willemiena Bouwman (5 February 1920 – 3 March 2007), also known by her resistance alias, Mien van Trouw, was a social worker and member of the Dutch Resistance who rescued dozens of Jewish children who were at risk of persecution and deportation by Nazi officials during World War II. She also played a role in the development of the Dutch newspaper, Trouw, as one of its earliest employees.

She was declared to be Righteous Among the Nations by Yad Vashem on 7 June 1992 for her rescue of Jewish children during the war.

== Formative years ==
Born in the village of Gees in the Netherlands province of Drenthe on 5 February 1920, Willemiena Bouwman was a daughter of the Rev. J. J. Bouwman. Sometime around the start of World War II, the family resided in Almelo; their father had been forced into hiding for forbidding a prominent member of the Nationaal-Socialistische Beweging (the National Socialist Movement in the Netherlands or NSB) from taking part in religious services related to an evening meal.

== World War II ==
Willemiena Bouwman found love during the early years of World War II with Willem Pieter (“Wim”) Speelman (1919–1945), one of the organizers of Trouw (“True” or “Allegiance”), an orthodox Protestant underground newspaper which was published illegally in violation of Nazi laws prohibiting the free operation of independent press outlets. An economics student at the Vrije Universiteit (Free University), Speelman had been involved with the Dutch Resistance since 1940, writing content for resistance advocacy pamphlets, as well as with Vrij Nederland (Free the Netherlands).

Under increasing scrutiny by Dutch and German officials, Speelman was forced to go into hiding on 20 April 1941 when that scrutiny turned into a wave of arrests at Trouw. Bouwman would later recall that his date of departure proved ironic since it fell on Adolf Hitler's birthday. By 1942, Bouwman and Speelman were engaged. Afterward, they went into hiding in Groningen; Bouwman then also became active with Trouw's work on behalf of the Dutch Resistance.

Film footage of the Jewish ghetto in Amsterdam (c. 1941-1944, public domain).

Using the alias “Mien van Trouw,” she joined Trouw's “verspreiders,” a group of couriers who covertly distributed the newspaper and confidential messages to resistance supporters. Carrying the materials from Amsterdam to Groningen twice weekly, she risked her life more and more with each trip because Dutch and German officials had declared that involvement with anti-Nazi newspapers was punishable by death.

By the summer of 1943, she and Speelman were also actively engaged in the rescue of Jewish children who were at risk of persecution and deportation by Nazi officials. Among those participating in this network was Hetty Voûte. According to Yad Vashem, just prior to beginning a massive July 1942 action in Amsterdam, Nazi authorities and their Dutch collaborators had designated the Hollandsche Schouwburg, a Jewish Theater there, as the main holding area for the targeted families. As this round up and subsequent actions progressed, children were separated from their parents and moved across the street to "the Crèche – what had been a day care center for the children of mostly Jewish working mothers." The parents were then taken to the Nazi transit camp at Westerbork, and held there until transported by cattle car to a death camp.

In 1943, using her alias, “Mien van Trouw,” Willemiena Bouwman became active with the ongoing Crèche rescues. Picking up children in Amsterdam on her return from courier trips for Trouw, she transported those children to safe houses located in Friesland and Groningen. Additional rescue trips were also undertaken to Drenthe and Overijssel. In one case, she escorted Barend Stempel on a dangerous train trip north. After dropping the two-year-old off at a temporary shelter, she was able to return home safely.

Film footage of May 1945 Liberation festivities, Amsterdam (Nederlands Instituut voor Beeld en Geluid, CCSA 3.0 Netherlands).

By September 1943, as child rescues from the Crèche declined, Willemiena Bouwman resumed her covert activities for Trouw. Three months later, her fiancé was arrested, but then managed to escape on 30 December. In January 1944, they relocated to Amsterdam in order to facilitate new resistance activities. A year later, her fiancé was arrested when the Sicherheitsdienst (also known as the “SD”) raided the printing office of Trouw on Amsterdam's Lijnbaansgracht. Just over two weeks later, Wim Speelman was executed. He was just 26 years old when he died at Halfweg on 19 February 1945. Soldiering on, Willemiena Bouwman (aka “Mien van Trouw”) took over her fiancé's former job with the newspaper. Ten weeks later, she oversaw the publication of Trouw's 5 May 1945 Liberation edition.

== Post-war life ==
Following her nation's liberation from its occupation by Germany and the end of World War II, Willemiena Bouwman left her newspaper work behind, and became a social worker at the Stichting Gezinszorg in Kennemerland. She also married and was widowed by fellow former Trouw courier Gerrit Dijkstra. Later, she wed for a second time, marrying Henk Vooren and becoming Wilhelmina Vooren-Bouwman.

She also served as a board member of the Christian Press Foundation. Reportedly “annoyed” with the “anti-revolutionary” stance of her former employer, she welcomed the change in the publication's tone in later years, according to Trouw. In 1977, she began work with the '40-'45 Foundation, a position she held until her 1985 retirement. An elder of the Reformed Church, she was also active with her local Council of Churches.

== Awards ==
She was declared to be Righteous Among the Nations by Yad Vashem on 7 June 1992 for her rescue of David de La Penha and Barend Stempel. Her name was inscribed on the Wall of Honor (Netherlands) in the Garden of the Righteous Among the Nations on the Mount of Remembrance in Jerusalem, Israel.

== Death and burial ==
Wilhelmina Vooren-Bouwman (aka "Mien van Trouw") died in Bennebroek, North Holland, Netherlands at the age of 87 on 3 March 2007.

== External resources ==
- "The Illegal Press ". Amsterdam, Netherlands: Dutch Resistance Museum.
- The Righteous Among the Nations (database). Jerusalem, Israel: Yad Vashem.
- “Trouw.” Nationaal Comité 4 en 5 mei 2018: Jaar van Verzet (National Committee of 2018: Year of the Resistance).
- “Waken over de naam van oom Wim, oprichter van Trouw” (“Watch over the name of Uncle Wim, founder of Trouw”). Amsterdam, Netherlands: Trouw, January 30, 2018.
