= Chodów, Lesser Poland Voivodeship =

Chodów
- Village
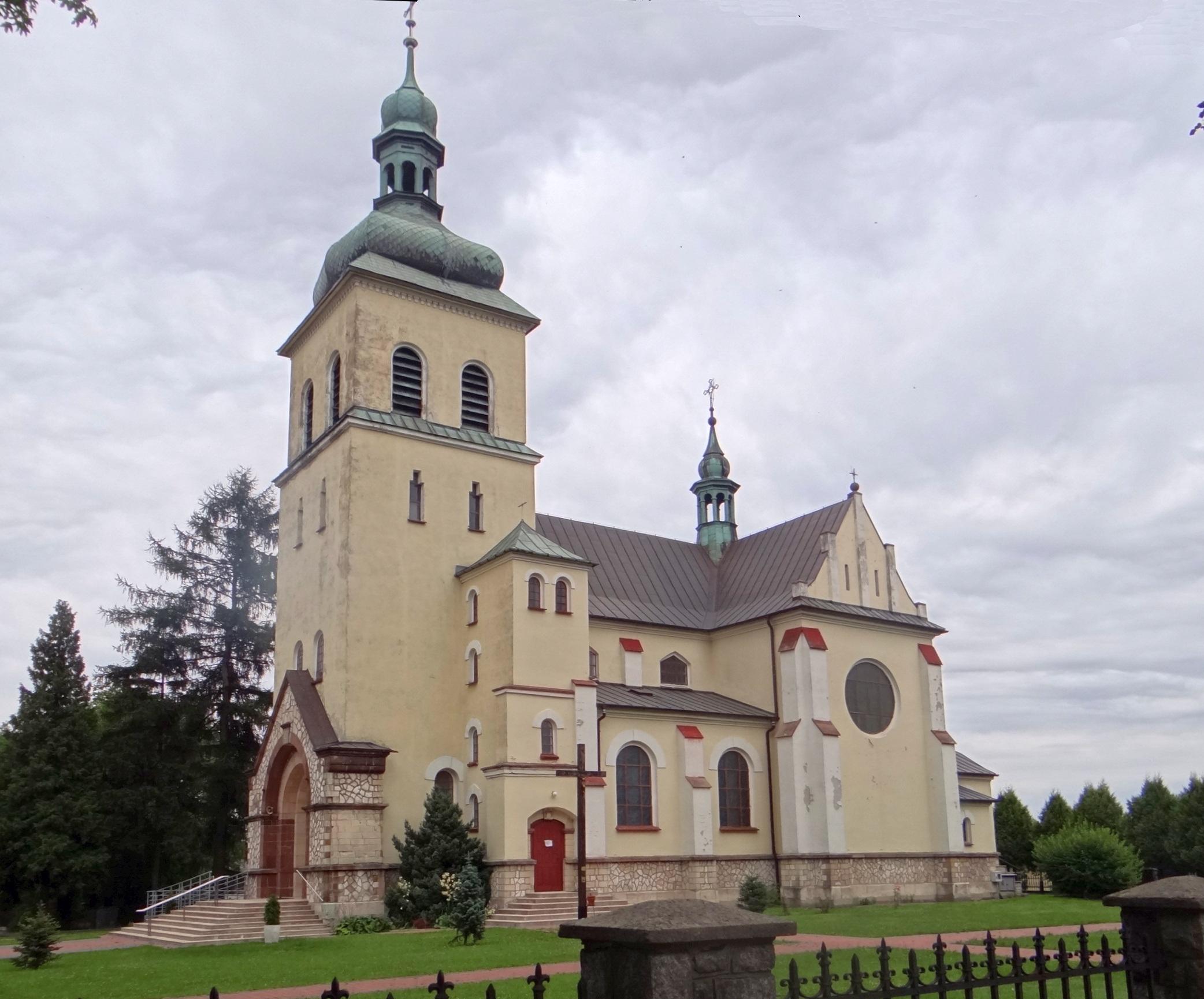
- Catholic church

- Location within Poland
- Coordinates: 50°23′5″N 19°58′10″E
- Country: Poland
- Voivodeship: Lesser Poland
- County: Miechów
- Gmina: Charsznica
- Population: 320

Chodów [ˈxɔduf] is a village in the administrative district of Gmina Charsznica, within Miechów County, Lesser Poland Voivodeship, in southern Poland.
