= April 1920 =

Month in 1920

| << | April 1920 | | | | | >> |
| Su | Mo | Tu | We | Th | Fr | Sa |
| | | | | 1 | 2 | 3 |
| 4 | 5 | 6 | 7 | 8 | 9 | 10 |
| 11 | 12 | 13 | 14 | 15 | 16 | 17 |
| 18 | 19 | 20 | 21 | 22 | 23 | 24 |
| 25 | 26 | 27 | 28 | 29 | 30 |

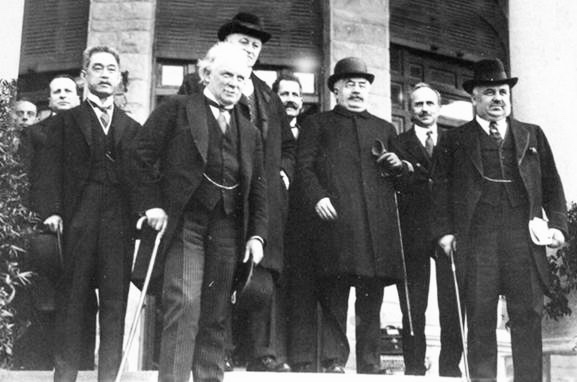
April 19–23, 1920: Allied Powers leaders gather at San Remo...

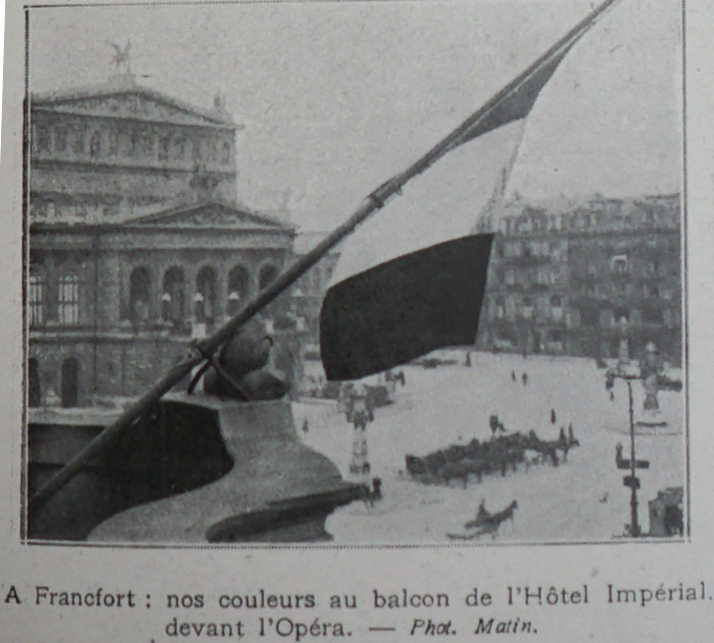
April 6, 1920: French troops seize Frankfurt and German cities

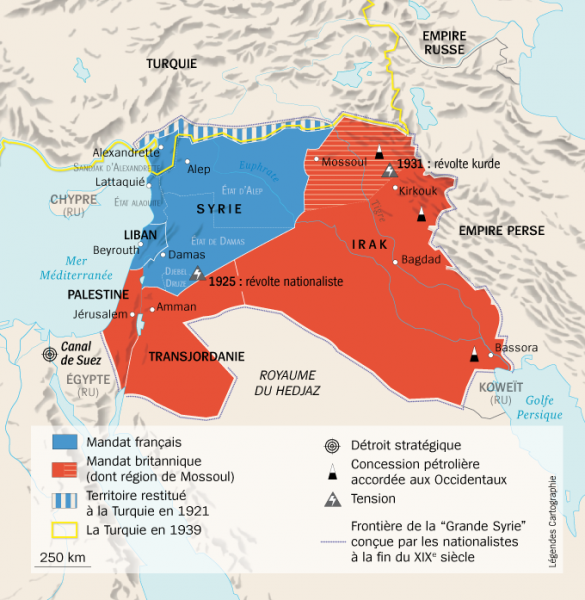
... divide the Ottoman Empire in the Middle East (British Mandates in Red, French Mandates in Blue)

The following events occurred in April 1920:

== April 1, 1920 (Thursday) ==
- Delaware turned down the chance to become the necessary 36th U.S. state to ratify the 19th Amendment (regarding women's suffrage) to the U.S. Constitution, as the House of Delegates voted 23 to 9 on a motion to reject the amendment.
- Ian Macpherson, resigned from the position as the UK's Chief Secretary of Ireland, in the wake of the second reading that favored the Irish Home Rule bill.
- Agreeing to the demand of the Allies occupying Constantinople, Salih Pasha and the Turkish cabinet resigned.
- The New York State House of Assembly voted to expel its five Socialist members, all of whom had been elected from boroughs in New York City. Louis Waldmann, August Claessens and Charles Solomon, who had been allowed by a court action to take their seats after the Assembly had voted against seating them, were expelled by a vote of 116 to 28. Samuel Orr and Samuel A. DeWitt were voted out by a margin of 104 to 40.
- Born: Toshiro Mifune, Japanese film star; in Qingdao (Tsingtao), Japanese-occupied China (d. 1997)

== April 2, 1920 (Friday) ==
- Germany sent troops into the Ruhr valley in violation of the Treaty of Versailles, in order to confront leftist workers. The German refusal to withdraw the troops prompted France to send its army to occupy Frankfurt, Hamburg and other German cities. Herr Wilhelm von Mayer, Germany's chargé d'affaires to France, met with Prime Minister Alexandre Millerand and said that some German troops had entered the demilitarized neutral zone (the 50 kilometres (31 mi) west of the Rhine River) on Thursday evening, but requested a waiver of the treaty in order to confront the leftist rebels. Premier Millerand informed von Mayer that the German troops would have to be withdrawn.
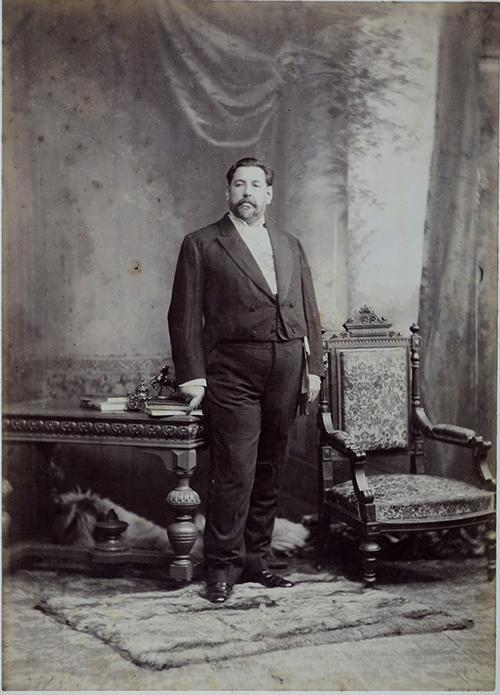
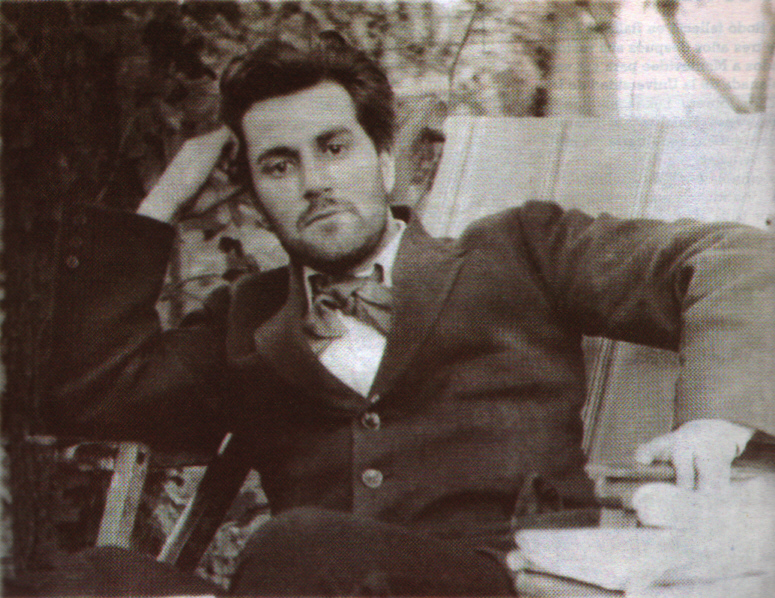
Batlle and Beltran
- José Batlle y Ordóñez, former President of Uruguay and founder of the Montevideo newspaper El Pais, was challenged to a duel by newspaper editor Washington Beltrán Barbat of El Dia after Batlle accused Beltrán of libel. Batlle killed Beltrán with a pistol shot to the chest.
- The Aqua String Band, a mainstay at the annual Mummers Parade in Philadelphia, was first organized.
- Born: Jack Webb, American actor, known for starring as Sergeant Joe Friday in Dragnet and the creator of the TV shows Adam-12 and Emergency!; as John Randolph Webb, in Santa Monica, California (d. 1982)
- Died: Matty McIntyre, 39, American baseball outfielder, died from tuberculosis (b. 1880)

== April 3, 1920 (Saturday) ==
- In one of the great celebrity marriages of the year, novelist F. Scott Fitzgerald and flapper Zelda Sayre were married in New York City, eight days after the publication of his bestselling novel, This Side of Paradise.
- Attempts are being made to carry out the failed assassination attempt on General Mannerheim, led by Aleksander Weckman by order of Eino Rahja, during the White Guard parade in Tampere, Finland.
- Died: Patrick D. Tyrrell, 88, Irish-born American detective who foiled a plot by grave robbers to steal the body of Abraham Lincoln (b. c. 1831)

== April 4, 1920 (Sunday) ==
- France announced that it would send troops to occupy the German cities of Frankfurt, Darmstadt, Homburg and Hanau, located within the neutral zone in the Ruhr Valley, because Germany had declined to withdraw its troops at French Prime Minister Millerand's request.
- The 1920 Nebi Musa riots began in old Jerusalem and lasted for three days in a clash between Arab Palestinians and Jewish immigrants.
- Denmark's Prime Minister Liebe resigned after only a few weeks in office, and King Christian X promised electoral reforms. The planned general strike in Denmark was called off.
- The Soviet Union issued a law requiring all workers to carry passbooks on their person as proof of employment.

== April 5, 1920 (Monday) ==
- After eight hours of fighting, Japanese Imperial Army troops took control of the Russian city of Vladivostok (Urajiosutoku) in order to stop the advance of Soviet troops. The Japan's imperial flag replaced the Russian ensign over all city government buildings.
- A strike of Chicago's railroad yard workers, not authorized by their labor union, put 50,000 related laborers out of work and tied Chicago's 25 railway lines. The strike spread to the rest of the United States during the week.
- Daylight saving time or "summer time", the practice of setting a clock forward in order to allow more daylight at the end of the workday, went into effect in Austria, Hungary and the Netherlands. It had been implemented in Belgium on February 14, France on March 1, and the United Kingdom on March 28, and would take effect in Yugoslavia on April 5.
- Born:
  - Arthur Hailey, British-born Canadian suspense novelist; in Luton, Bedfordshire (d. 2004)
  - Barend Biesheuvel, Prime Minister of the Netherlands from 1971 to 1973; in Haarlemmerliede (d. 2001)
- Died: Laurent-Honoré Marqueste, 71, French sculptor (b. 1848)

== April 6, 1920 (Tuesday) ==
Far Eastern Republic flag

- The Far Eastern Republic (Dalnevostochnaya Respublika or DVR) was established on Russia's Pacific coast as a buffer state between Russia and Japanese-occupied Russian territory. Verkhneudinsk was the first capital, and Bolshevik politician Alexander Krasnoshchyokov was installed as the regime's first President and Prime Minister. The DVR would be annexed into the Russian SFSR in 1922.
- Two days after France announced the occupation of Germany's Rhine Valley, French Army troops under the command of General Degoutte marched into Frankfurt and Darmstadt erected the French Tricolor over the Town Halls of both cities. In a military operation that New York Times correspondent Walter Duranty described as "the most wonderful ever carried out by one army in another country", the Third Regiment of the Moroccan Rifles, Morocco natives under French Army command, arrived in Frankfurt at 12:30 in the morning and met no resistance. Troops also moved into Hamburg, Hanau and Dieburg and disarmed striking workmen.
- Germany's Army, the Reichswehr, marched into Essen, site of the largest concentration of leftist rebels in the Ruhr zone.
- General Romanovsky, former Chief of Staff to White Russian Lieutenant General Anton Denikin, was murdered when he arrived at the Russian Embassy in Constantinople, shortly after his arrival in the Turkey. General Denikin resigned and was succeeded by General Pyotr Wrangel.
- Herbert Hoover, who had recently declared that he would only accept a Republican nomination for president, was on the presidential primary ballot for both parties in Michigan, finishing in first place as a Democrat (with 22,752 votes) and fourth place as a Republican (with 49,461 votes). California U.S. Senator Hiram Johnson won the Republican primary.
- In Wisconsin, Daniel Hoan, the Socialist Party of America Mayor of Milwaukee, was elected to a second term of office.
- The Supreme Court of Canada ruled that the government could not control the supply of paper for newsprint under a law permitting rationing control for necessities of life.
- Anatolia News Agency was founded in Ankara, Turkey.
- Born: Edmond H. Fischer, Swiss-American biochemist, 1992 Nobel Prize laureate; in China's Shanghai International Settlement, Shanghai, Republic of China (d. 2021)

== April 7, 1920 (Wednesday) ==
- Turkish forces destroyed the Armenian village of Harouniyi and an American missionary orphanage in the village.
- French Moroccan troops in Frankfurt fired on a mob of protesters, killing seven people, including three women and a boy.
- Born: Ravi Shankar, Indian musician known for his influence on The Beatles and other western artists; as Ravindra Shankar Chowdhury, in Benares, United Provinces of Agra and Oudh, British India (now Varanasi, Uttar Pradesh, India) (d. 2012)

== April 8, 1920 (Thursday) ==
- Rebels took control of Guatemala City, and the Guatemalan Army under the command of President Estrada began shelling the capital.
- Britain refused to join France in occupying the German Rhineland, and all other Allies except for Belgium agreed.
- Germany appealed to the Supreme Council of the League of Nations to arbitrate the issues of the French occupation. Because Germany was not a League member, the appeal was rejected.
- The German cabinet voted to accede to France's demand for the withdrawal of German troops from the Ruhr Valley. The withdrawal of forces, to the treaty limit of 17,000 men, was accomplished by the Germans by April 26.
- An agreement was reached between Italy and Yugoslavia over the Adriatic territory, with Italy to acquire Fiume and Albazia, and Yugoslavia getting Susak, Canale della Fiumara, Porto Baross, Volosca and Scutari.
- The Soviet Navy auxiliary cruiser Caspian foundered in a storm in the Caspian Sea and 52 of her 65 crew were killed. The 13 survivors were rescued by the destroyer Proletarskiy. Fourteen years after its sinking, the Caspian would be raised from the Soviet lake in 1934 and restored to service as a transport ship.
- During a tour of Hawaii, Edward, Prince of Wales, the 25-year old heir to the British throne and the future King Edward VIII, became the first member of British royalty to try surfing. In the evening, Prince Edward then boarded the Royal Navy battleship HMS Renown to begin his state visit to Australia.
- Died:
  - John A. Brashear, 79, American astronomer and inventor (b. 1840)
  - Charles Tomlinson Griffes, 35, American composer, died of influenza (b. 1884)

== April 9, 1920 (Friday) ==
- New York City became the latest metropolis to see the shutdown of railroad service across the United States as workers went on strike in the largest city in the U.S., stopping freight from being shipped into the city; subway service ceased at 5:00 the next morning. At the time, railroad workers were on strike in California, Chicago, Detroit, St. Louis, Kansas City, and Indianapolis. By the end of April, most strikes were settled and rail service resumed nationwide.
- Although the U.S. Senate had failed to ratify the Treaty of Versailles, the U.S. House of Representatives approved an alternative to officially declaring the end of World War I, voting 242 to 150 "to declare war with Germany at an end."
- Germany warned the government of France that the French would be held responsible for any property damage or injuries arising from the Rhineland occupation.
- Former U.S. Food Relief Administrator Herbert Hoover sent a telegram to Democratic Party officials to make clear that he would not accept a nomination to run for President of the United States as a Democrat. Hoover would be elected president in 1928 as a Republican.

== April 10, 1920 (Saturday) ==
Sonora

- The legislature of the Mexican state of Sonora voted to disassociate from the United Mexican States. In a closed door session at Hermosillo, the Sonoran state legislature voted to take up arms to resist President Carranza's attempt to send federal troops into the state. Sonora's Governor, Adolfo de la Huerta had ordered the seizure of the Southern Pacific Railroad lines within Sonoran borders and the next day, Huerta reportedly was described having become "the supreme power in the Republic of Sonora."
- General Obregon of Mexico was arrested and imprisoned in Mexico City.
- Ninety United States Marines arrived in Guatemala City to protect the American diplomatic legation from rebel troops, after being brought to Guatemala's Atlantic coast on the cruiser USS Tacoma and the patrol ship USS Niagara. The entire guard was withdrawn on April 27.
- Germany's government notified all German states to cooperate in reducing the army to 200,000 men as agreed in the Treaty of Versailles.
- Died: Moritz Cantor, 90, German mathematical historian known for his four volume work Vorlesungen über Geschichte der Mathematik (b. 1828)

== April 11, 1920 (Sunday) ==
- On Easter Sunday, a "national war on big lotteries" in the United States opened in Columbus, Ohio as police arrested representatives of three foreign companies that were printing lottery tickets and selling them in America. The four outlaw companies identified were the Honduras Lottery, the Cuban Lottery, the Metropolitan Lottery of Canada, and the "Alaskan Lottery."
- SS Bastia, an Italian freighter with a cargo of refined oil, exploded in harbor at Naples, causing an estimated $5,000,000 in damage and hurling fragments 200 yards (180 m), but with few casualties to the crew and none to bystanders. The Italian Navy then fired cannons to sink the flaming ship in order "to avert danger to adjacent shipping."
- Born:
  - Peter O'Donnell, British comic strip author, known for Modesty Blaise, wrote romance novels under the female pseudonym "Madeline Brent"; in London (d. 2010)
  - Emilio Colombo, Italian politician, prime minister of Italy from 1970 to 1972; in Potenza (d. 2013)
- Died:
  - John Baptist Crozier, 67, leader of the Church of Ireland as Primate of All Ireland (b. 1853)
  - Ferdinand Roybet, 79, French painter and engraver (b. 1840)
  - Vlasis Gavriilidis, 71, Greek newspaper publisher (b. 1848)

== April 12, 1920 (Monday) ==
- Sonora's Governor Adolfo de la Huerta resigned and was succeeded by General P. Elias Calles.
- Died: Walter Edwards, 50, American silent film director (b. 1870)

== April 13, 1920 (Tuesday) ==
- The Mayor of Dublin pledged support to Irish Sinn Féin prisoners on hunger strike, and Irish labor leaders called a general strike.
- The leaders of Islam for both Turkey's Sultan and the Republican nationalists ordered a jihad against each other.
- Born:
  - Liam Cosgrave, Taoiseach of Ireland from 1973 to 1977; as William Michael Cosgrave, in Castleknock, Dublin (d. 2017)
  - Marthe Cohn, French spy and Holocaust survivor; in Metz, Moselle département (d. 2025)
  - Roberto Calvi, controversial Italian banker and chairman of Banco Ambrosiano; in Milan (killed 1982)

== April 14, 1920 (Wednesday) ==
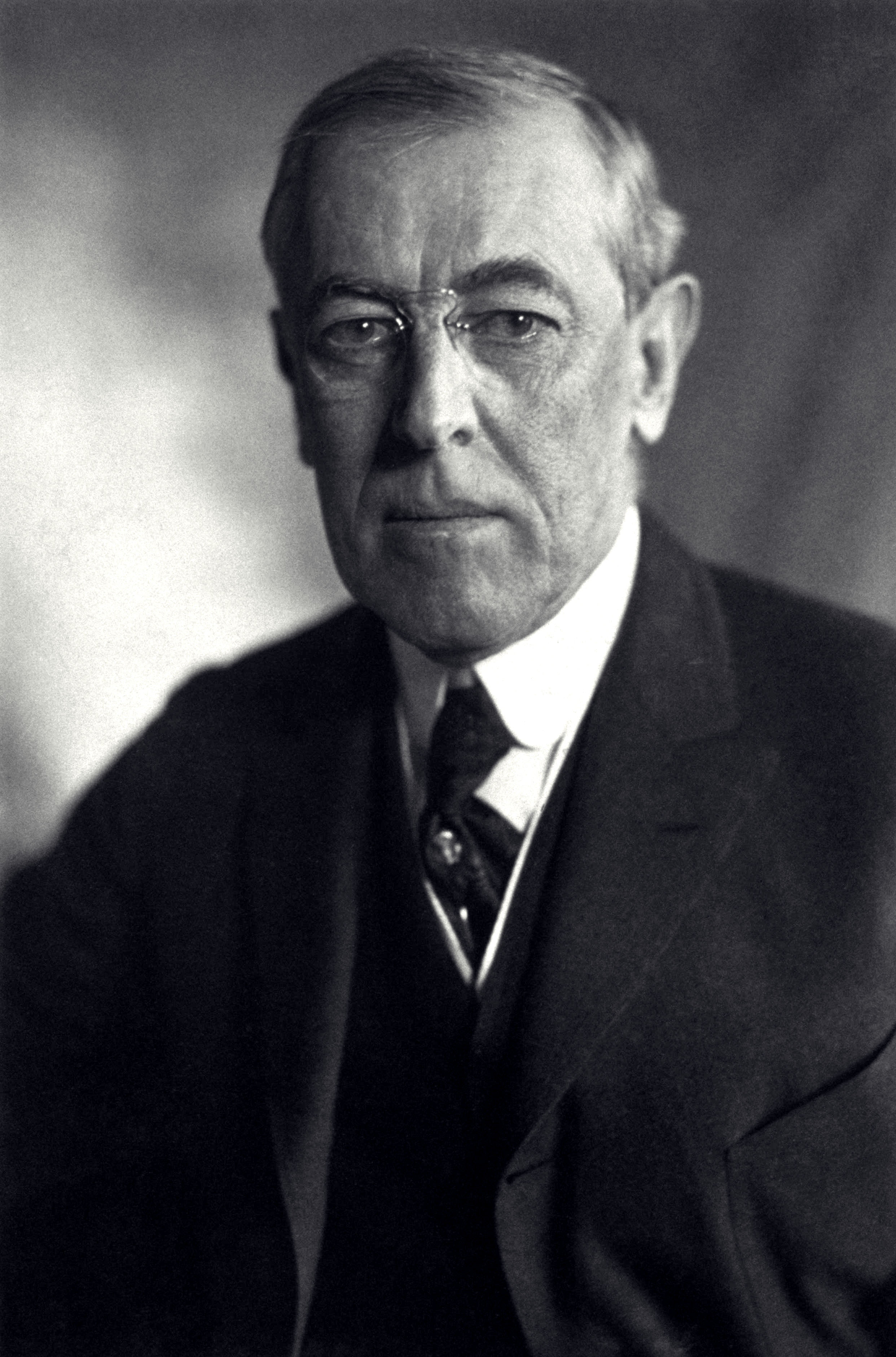
U.S. President Wilson

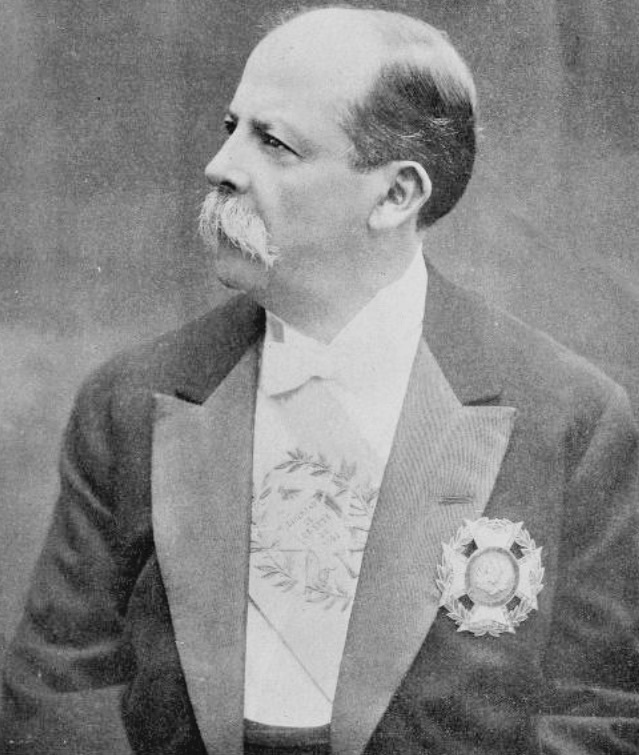
Guatemalan President Estrada

- After a disability of more than six months because of a stroke, U.S. President Woodrow Wilson met with his Cabinet for the first time since September 2.
- Manuel Estrada Cabrera, president of Guatemala since 1898, surrendered to rebels at the end of the "Semana Tragica"— the "Tragic Week"— that followed Estrada's refusal to step down from office after being declared mentally unfit for the job. Estrada was surrounded at La Palma, southeast of the capital, and capitulated after being guaranteed his safety by Carlos Herrera, the new provisional President.
- General Nevil Macready, newly appointed to lead British Army forces in Ireland, ordered the release of jailed Sinn Féin prisoners, bringing an end to their 10-day hunger strike.
- In a battle at El Fuerte, Sonoran rebels defeated Mexico's federal troops.
- After the intervention by the United States embassy, a ceasefire was brokered between Guatemalan rebels and the Guatemalan government.
- Born:
  - Ivor Forbes Guest, British historian and writer, chairman of the Royal Academy of Dance from 1970 to 1993; in Chislehurst, London (d. 2018)
  - Mona Vangsaae, Danish ballet dancer; in Copenhagen (d. 1983)
- Died: Traugott von Sauberzweig, 56, Prussian Army Officer who served as the German Military Governor of Belgium during World War I and signed the death warrant for Edith Cavell (b. 1863)

== April 15, 1920 (Thursday) ==
- A double murder, that would become one of the most famous criminal cases of the 1920s, was committed in South Braintree, Massachusetts when a group of armed robbers stole the payroll for the Slater & Morrell shoe factory. Alessandro Berardelli was guarding the factory paymaster, Frederick A. Parmenter, when both were shot outside of the factory gates. Berardelli died at the scene, and Parmenter died in the hospital the next day. The murders would soon be pinned on Nicola Sacco and Bartolomeo Vanzetti, and their conviction in 1921 would lead to worldwide protests to "Save Sacco and Vanzetti" as their execution approached in 1927.
- Police forces in Dublin carried out the largest raid up to that time of Irish Republicans, arresting more than 100 prisoners.
- At 9:00 in the morning, the 17,000 elevator operators in New York City's buildings went on strike for higher wages. At the time, the 57-story Woolworth Building and the 50-story Metropolitan Life building were the two tallest in the city. The strike ended after a week.
- The Allied Powers warned Germany that if it failed to abide by the Treaty of Versailles, the Germans would be subject to an embargo on food and raw materials.
- Born:
  - Richard von Weizsäcker, German politician, the last President of West Germany (1984 to 1990), and President of Germany following reunification from 1990 to 1994; in Stuttgart, Germany (d. 2015)
  - Thomas Szasz, Hungarian-born American psychiatrist and activist, known for his opposition to involuntary psychiatric treatment and his 1961 book The Myth of Mental Illness; in Budapest (d. 2012)

== April 16, 1920 (Friday) ==
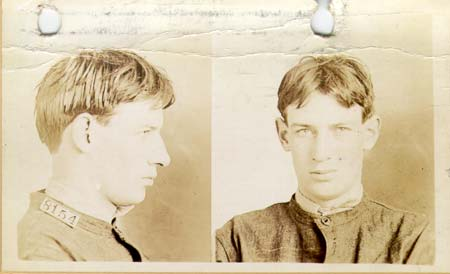
Mugshot of Robert Stroud, c. 1912

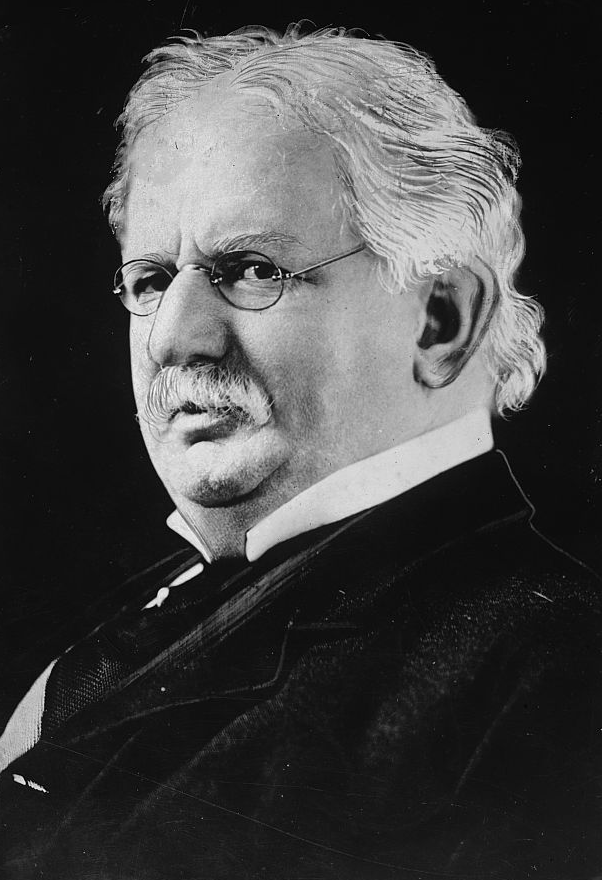
Theodore Vail

- The first overseas airplane flight from the United States took place when a flying boat carried freight from Miami to Nassau in the Bahamas.
- The death sentence of Robert Stroud, who would become famous as the "Birdman of Alcatraz", was commuted to life imprisonment by U.S. President Wilson.
- Childers Classical Institute, founded near Abilene, Texas in 1906 and built on land owned by J. W. Childers, was renamed as Abilene Christian College after the Childers family was paid $4,000 by the institute's board of trustees. In 1976, it would receive its present name of Abilene Christian University.
- Died: Theodore N. Vail, 74, American businessman who served as the first President of the American Telephone and Telegraph Company (b. 1845)

== April 17, 1920 (Saturday) ==
- The Overall Club movement, which had originated in Jacksonville, Florida, as a protest against the high prices of clothing and then "went viral" as it was reported in the U.S. press, reached the U.S. Congress. Breaching the congressional dress code, U.S. Representative William David Upshaw of Georgia appeared on the floor of the House of Representatives wearing "a $4 suit of one-piece blue overalls" and told reporters that he was the president of the "Congress Overall and Old Clothes Club." After initially being denied the right to address Congress by the Speaker of the House, Upshaw went to meet with the press, prompting a crowd to fill the galleries, and was given the right to make a two-minute speech.

== April 18, 1920 (Sunday) ==
- At the moment of funeral services for former AT&T President Theodore N. Vail, telephone service was halted across the United States from 11:00 to 11:01 a.m. Eastern Time (8:00 to 8:01 a.m. Pacific Time). The moment of silence affected 12 million AT&T telephones.
- The first national elections in Czechoslovakia, for the new nation's first National Assembly, took place as candidates from 16 political parties vied for 281 of the 300 seats of the Chamber of Deputies. Elections for the 100 member Senate took place one week later.
- The states of Michoacan and Nayarit joined Sonora in seceding from the United Mexican States.

== April 19, 1920 (Monday) ==
- The Allied Prime Ministers (David Lloyd George of the UK, Alexandre Millerand of France, and Francesco Nitti of Italy) met at San Remo to divide up the defeated Ottoman Empire.
- Died: Jean Baffier, 68, French sculptor (b. 1851)

== April 20, 1920 (Tuesday) ==
- Tornadoes killed 155 people in the U.S. states of Mississippi, Alabama and Tennessee. Among the locations heavily damaged were Meridian, Mississippi and a plantation near Aberdeen, Mississippi, with 21 deaths at each location.
- Born: John Paul Stevens, American lawyer and jurist, served as associate justice of the Supreme Court of the United States from 1975 to 2010; in Chicago (d. 2019)
- Died: Briton Rivière, 79, British painter (b. 1840)

== April 21, 1920 (Wednesday) ==
- Wu Ting-fang, the Foreign Minister for South China, announced a merger between North China and South China, with a parliament at Shanghai.
- Germany asked the Allies to permit it to have 200,000 troops rather than 100,000 troops. The request was denied on April 26.
- The states of Hidalgo, led by Governor Nicolas Flores, and Tlaxcala, led by Maximo Rojas, seceded, bringing the number of rebel states in Mexico to nine.
- Died:
  - Maria Sanford, 83, American educator and one of the first women in the United States to serve as a university professor. Her statue is one of the two selected to represent Minnesota at the United States Capitol (b. 1836)
  - Henry Mosler, 78, American painter and illustrator (b. 1841)

== April 22, 1920 (Thursday) ==
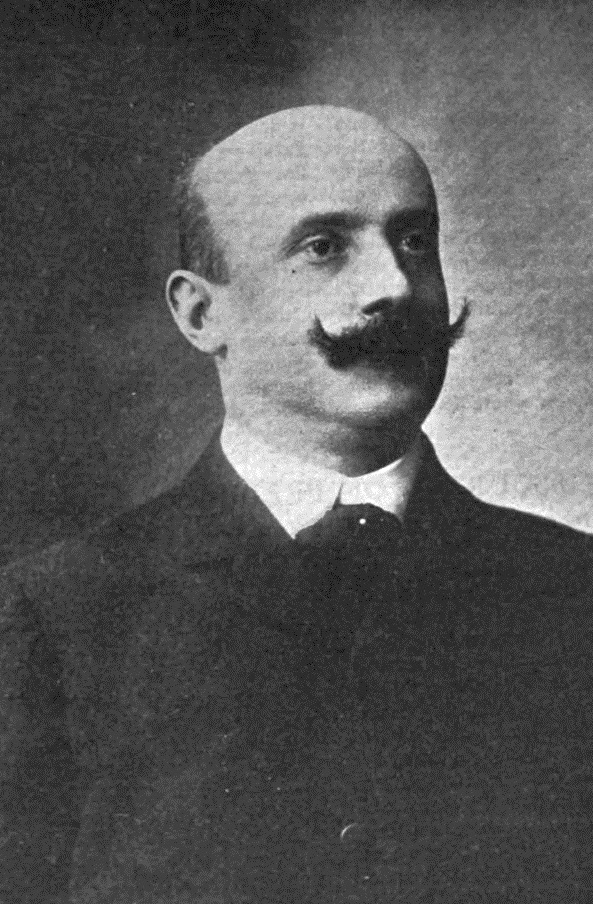
Former premier Caillaux

- Former Prime Minister of France Joseph Caillaux was acquitted by the French Senate of charges of high treason, but was convicted of "commerce and correspondence with the enemy" during World War One and was exiled for five years.
- The Republican Party released the results for the presidential primaries held in six states up to that time. General Leonard Wood was first with 311,766 votes; Illinois Governor Frank Lowden and U.S. Senator Hiram Johnson of California were a close second and third.

== April 23, 1920 (Friday) ==
- The first gathering of the Grand National Assembly of Turkey (Türkiye Büyük Millet Meclisi, commonly called the Meclis) took place at the new capital, Ankara. The event is now commemorated in a unique public holiday, National Sovereignty and Children's Day, and in a ceremony where schoolchildren selected from around the nation gather in the parliamentary building to represent their constituencies.
- At the close of the San Remo conference, the Allied premiers announced that in the breakup of the Ottoman Empire, Armenia would receive complete independence, and İzmir (Smyrna) would remain part of Turkey but would be administered by Greece.
- Ice hockey was played for the first time in the Olympic games, with seven teams at a world championship tournament in Antwerp in Belgium, almost four months ahead of the Summer Olympic competition that was scheduled to start on August 14. In the opening game at the Palais de Glace d'Anvers, Sweden defeated Belgium, 8 to 0. Erik Burman scored the first Olympic ice hockey goal.

== April 24, 1920 (Saturday) ==
- At least 150 people were killed in a collision on the Oudh and Rohilkhand Railway, between a passenger train and a freight train hauling fuel in India near Delhi According to reports at the scene, the blaze had burned hot enough to melt silver coins that many of the passengers were carrying.
- The United Kingdom and France signed an agreement regarding the division of ownership of the Turkish Petroleum Company that had a monopoly on oil exploration and drilling in the Mesopotamian area of the Ottoman Empire (now Iraq) John Cadman signed on behalf of the UK and Philippe Berthelot for France at the San Remo conference in San Remo on the Italian Riviera.
- Over 1,000 officials of the Ottoman Empire, including former Ottoman Grand Vizier Ahmed Izzet Pasha, were arrested by the Allies. Anatolia, led by Mustapha Kemal, proclaimed its independence.
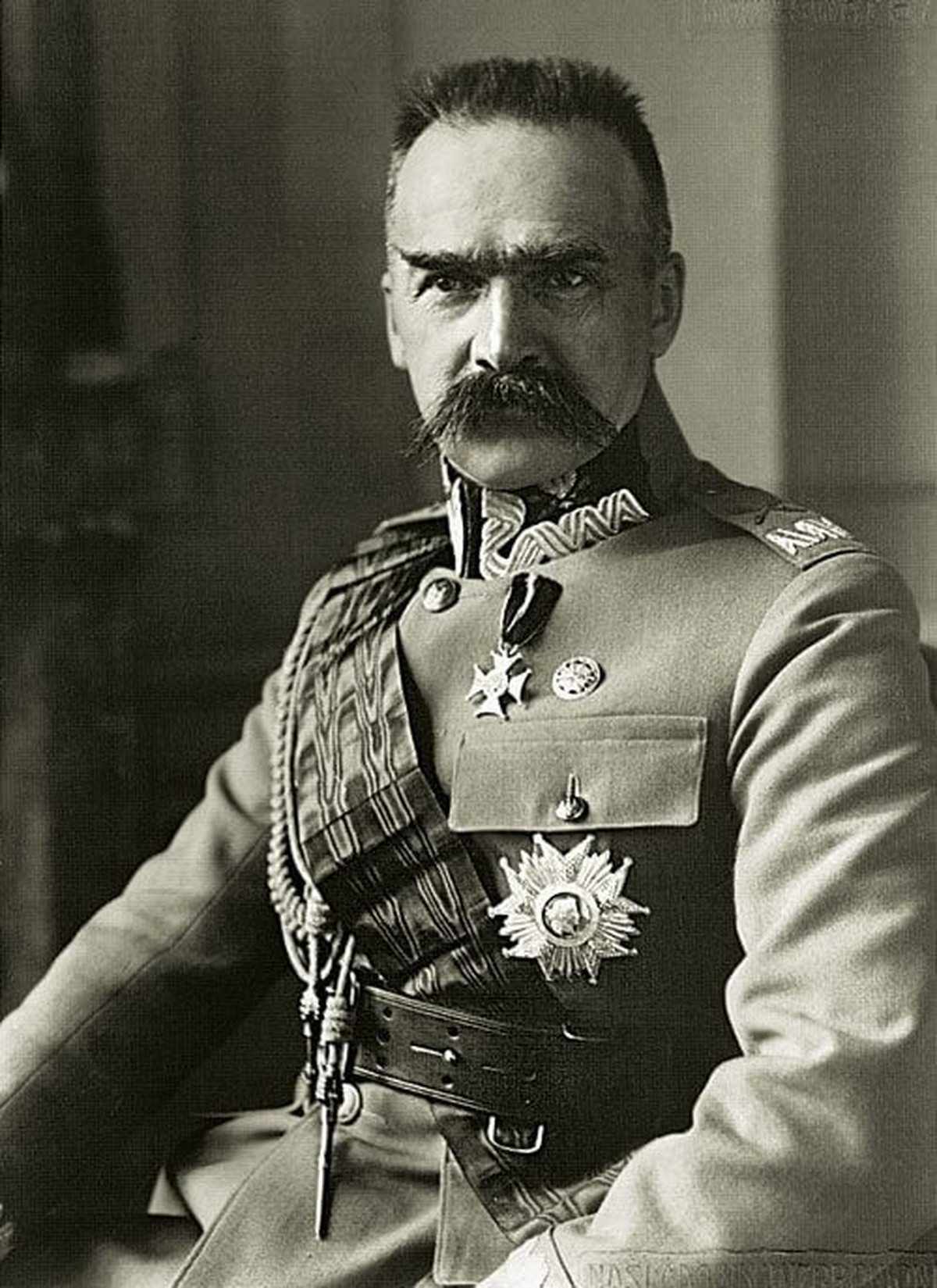
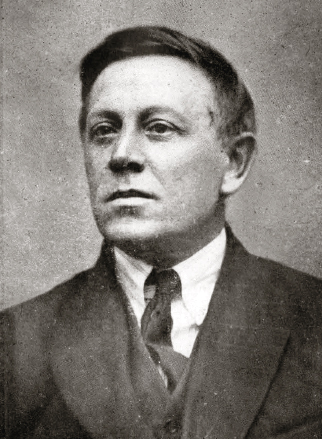
  Pilsudski and Petlaia
- Poland's chief of state Józef Piłsudski, and the Ukrainian People's Republic's President, Symon Petliura, signed an alliance to begin the recapture of Kiev from the Soviet Union.
- The United States Olympic ice hockey team set a scoring record that would stand for more than 100 years, defeating the Switzerland team, 29 goals to 0. Anthony Conroy scored eight of the goals.
- Born: Wilhelm Schlombs, German architect; in Köln (d. 1993)
- Died: Edward Bancroft Williston, 82, U.S. military officer and Medal of Honor recipient (b. 1837)

== April 25, 1920 (Sunday) ==
- The League of Nations Supreme Council voted to place Palestine under British protection for a future Jewish state. In addition, the League gave France the mandate over Syria, and that the United Kingdom had the mandate over Mesopotamia (now Iraq), and offered the United States a mandate over Armenia.
- The Interchurch World Movement, a partnership of various Protestant Christian denominations, announced the beginning of its plan to raise $336,777,572 within eight days a nationwide campaign After a Presbyterian denomination and a Baptist one dropped out, the Interchurch movement leader announced that on June 28 they were abandoning the worldwide "billion dollar campaign" effective July 8.
- Born: Robert Q. Lewis (stage name for Robert Goldberg), American radio and television comedian; in New York City (d. 1991)
- Died:
  - Charles A. Nichols, 43, U.S. Representative for Michigan since 1915 to 1920, died from a heart attack at his home in Washington D.C. (b. 1876) "Congressman Dies from Heart Failure", The Evening Star (Washington, D.C.), April 26, 1920
  - Clarine Seymour, 21, American silent film star, died from complications of emergency surgery for a bowel obstruction (b. 1898)
  - W. C. Wilkinson, 86, American author and theologist (b. 1833)

== April 26, 1920 (Monday) ==
- What has become known as "The Great Debate" took place between American astronomers Harlow Shapley and Heber D. Curtis at the annual meeting of the National Academy of Sciences in Washington, at the Smithsonian Museum of Natural History. Shapley maintained that the Milky Way galaxy contained almost all of the stars, nebulae, and star clusters in the universe. Curtis advanced the theory that there were more than a million galaxies (which one press account described at the time as "island universes"). Curtis placed the Sun near the center of the relatively small Milky Way galaxy, while Shapley said that the Sun (and hence the Solar System) was far from the universe's center. Each was right about some things and wrong about others.
- Canada, represented by Winnipeg Falcons amateur team, won the gold medal game in the first Olympic ice hockey competition, defeating Sweden, 12 to 1. Competition continued for three more days for the silver medal and the bronze medal.
- Japan demanded the Soviet Union evacuate its troops to a distance of at least 30 kilometres (19 mi) from Japanese troops.

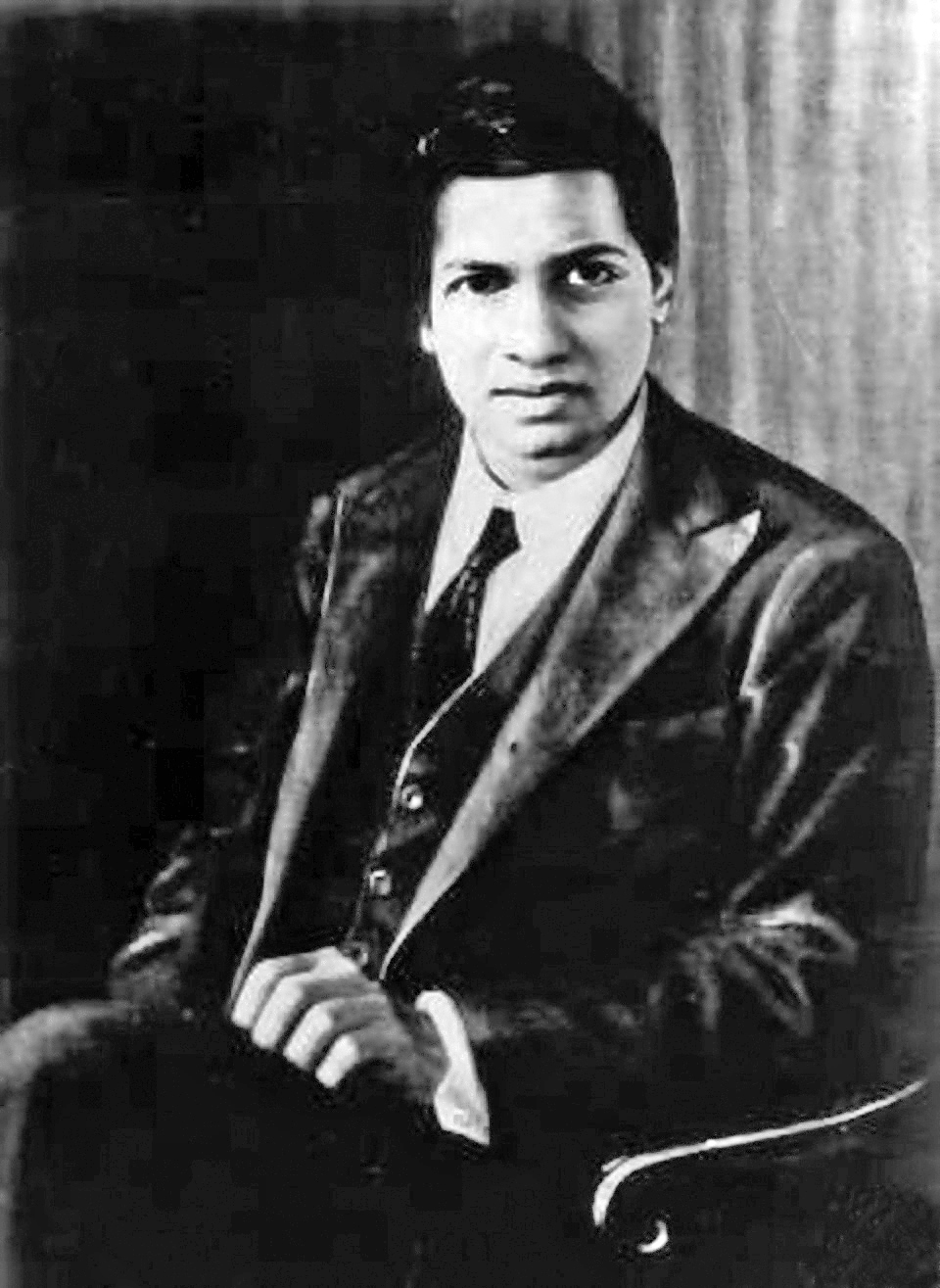
Srinivasa Ramanujan

- Born: Padú del Caribe, Aruban songwriter and independence activist, author of Aruba's national anthem, "Aruba Dushi Tera"; as Juan Chabaya Lampe, in Oranjestad, Netherlands Antilles (present-day Aruba) (d. 2019)
- Died:
  - Srinivasa Ramanujan, 32, India mathematician known for his identification of the Ramanujan prime, "Ramanujan's lost notebook", and for an anecdote of the number 1729 being called the Hardy–Ramanujan number, died from amoebic dysentery (b. 1887)
  - Marjorie Benton Cooke, 43, American playwright and novelist, died from pneumonia while on a visit to the Philippines (b. 1876)

== April 27, 1920 (Tuesday) ==
- U.S. Senator Warren G. Harding of Ohio won a narrow victory over Leonard Wood in the Republican presidential primary in the Ohio Republican primary, while Ohio Governor James M. Cox won the Democratic primary. Harding and Cox would win their respective parties' nominations for the U.S. presidential election.
- France prohibited the importation of 197 different items.
- The United States War Risk Insurance Company announced that it had settled claims for death or permanent disability for 627,651 Americans who served in World War I.
- Born: Guido Cantelli, Italian orchestral conductor; in Novara (d. 1956, killed in Paris DC-6 crash)

== April 28, 1920 (Wednesday) ==
Azerbaijan Republic and Azerbaijani SSR
- One day after Russian Soviet troops had captured Baku, the capital of the new Azerbaijan Democratic Republic, the independent nation was annexed into the Soviet Union as the Azerbaijan Soviet Socialist Republic.
- The Soviet government, through its newspaper Izvestia, announced that the anti-counterrevolutionary had arrested 21,032 people for "counterrevolutionary crimes", 19,673 for breach of office, 8,167 for speculation, 9,514 for "anti-Bolshevik opinions, and about 70,000 for other crimes. Of that group, 9,641 were ordered to be executed by gunshot.
- The U.S. seaplane HS2-L completed its 1,500 miles (2,400 km) flight from Miami to New York City in 15 hours and 35 minutes.

== April 29, 1920 (Thursday) ==
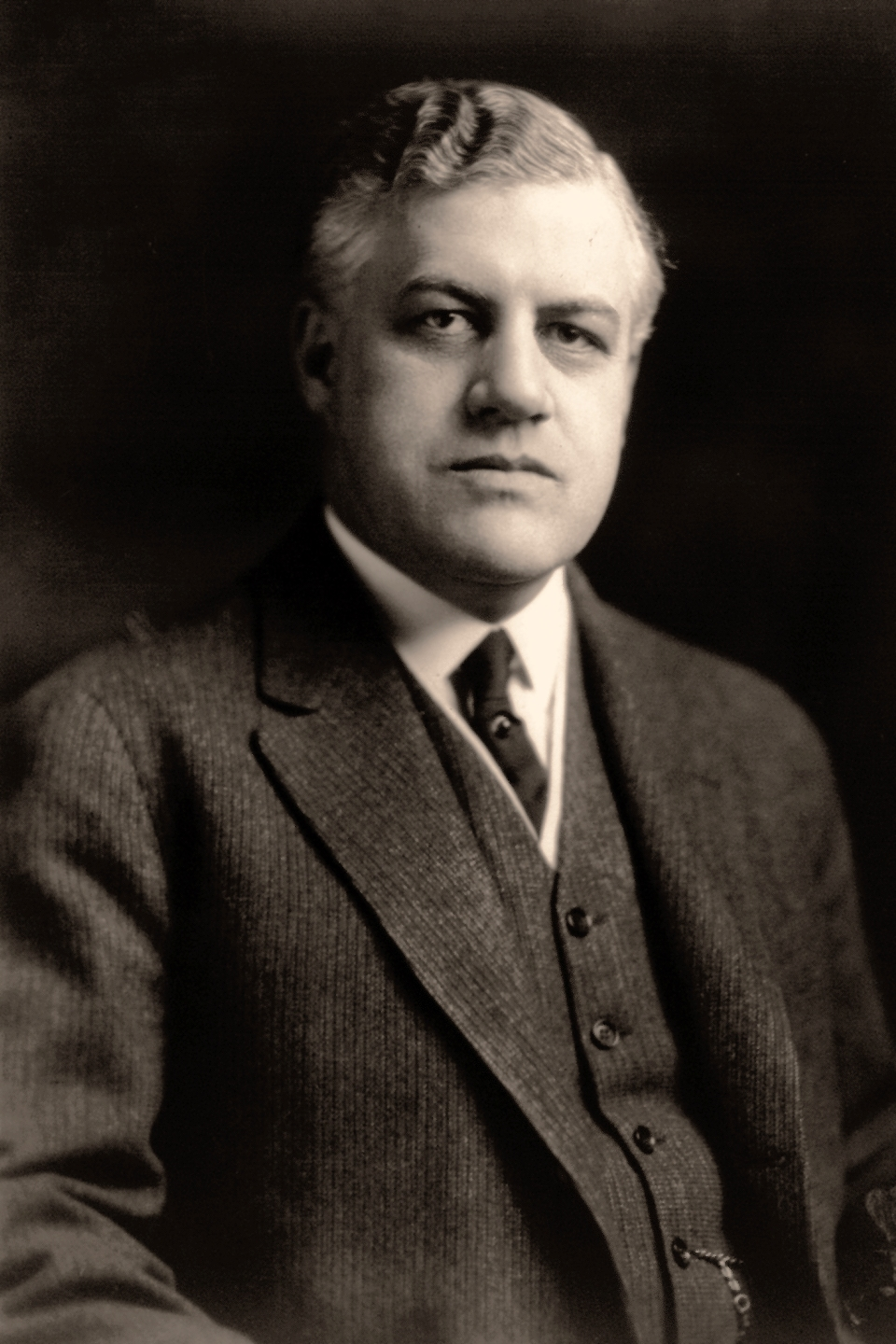
A. Mitchell Palmer

- U.S. Attorney General A. Mitchell Palmer terrified the American public at the height of the "Red Scare" by claiming to reporters that he had a list of "marked men" whom Communist Americans would target for assassination during the "International Labor Day" demonstrations on May 1. Palmer said in an afternoon press conference, "A warning has been issued by the department to all those whose names are included in the list of marked men, and the department has taken steps to furnish protection." Palmer declined to identify any of the "marked men," but said that members of the Communist Party of America, the Communist Labor Party and the International Workers of the World" were believed to be planning a May Day uprising "to force recognition of the Russian Soviet" by the U.S. government. May Day passed without incident. Palmer lost credibility and his warnings of domestic terrorism were no longer taken seriously.
- Born: Harold Shapero, American classical music composer; in Lynn, Massachusetts (d. 2013)

== April 30, 1920 (Friday) ==

- The German Republic enacted a law to create a single national railroad, the Deutsche Reichseisenbahnen, by acquiring the seven state-owned railways of Baden, Mecklenburg, Oldenburg, Bavaria, Saxony, Württemberg and Prussia.
- The Studebaker factory in South Bend, Indiana, which had manufactured horse-drawn wagons and carriages since 1852, produced its first automobile. The Studebaker company had previously manufactured automobiles in Detroit.
- The potential of airplane travel for passengers was demonstrated as "Miami, Fla., and New York City became less than a day's traveling distance apart" on a Curtiss HS-2L flying boat that made the trip that took 15 hours and 35 minutes actual flying time. Piloted by Harry Rogers and Sidney Schroeder, the seaplane, christened "Miss Miami", landed in a driving rain on the Hudson River at 86th Street at 8:35 in the evening. Rogers and Schroeder made only one stop, refueling at Morehead City, North Carolina, a process that they estimated to have taken an hour. "Had we had the necessary space," Rogers said of his fuel tanks, "there is no doubt that we could have come all the way without a stop."
- Born:
  - Berendina Eman, Netherlands Resistance leader during World War II;in The Hague (d. 2019)
  - Gerda Lerner, Austrian-born American feminist; as Gerda Hedwig Kronstein, in Vienna (d. 2013)
- Died: William Barret Ridgely, 61, U.S. Comptroller of the Currency from 1901 to 1908 (b. 1858)
