= March 1920 =

Month in 1920

<<	March 1920					>>
Su	Mo	Tu	We	Th	Fr	Sa
	1	2	3	4	5	6
7	8	9	10	11	12	13
14	15	16	17	18	19	20
21	22	23	24	25	26	27
28	29	30	31

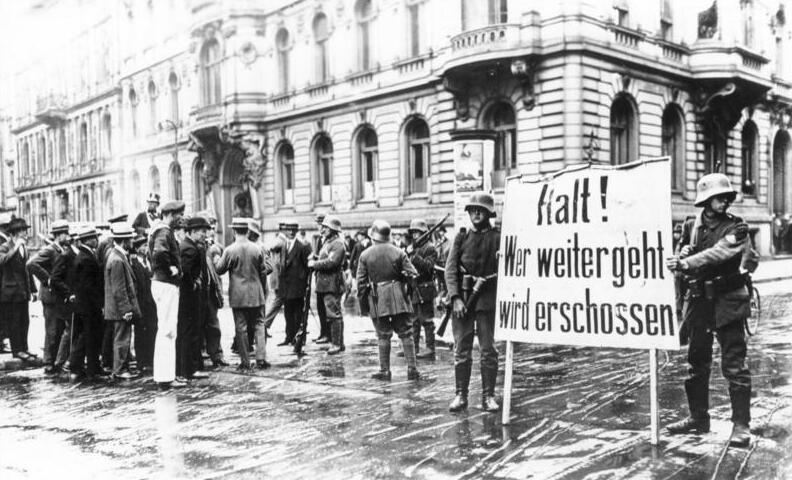
March 13, 1920: Wolfgang Kapp attempts to overthrow government of Germany

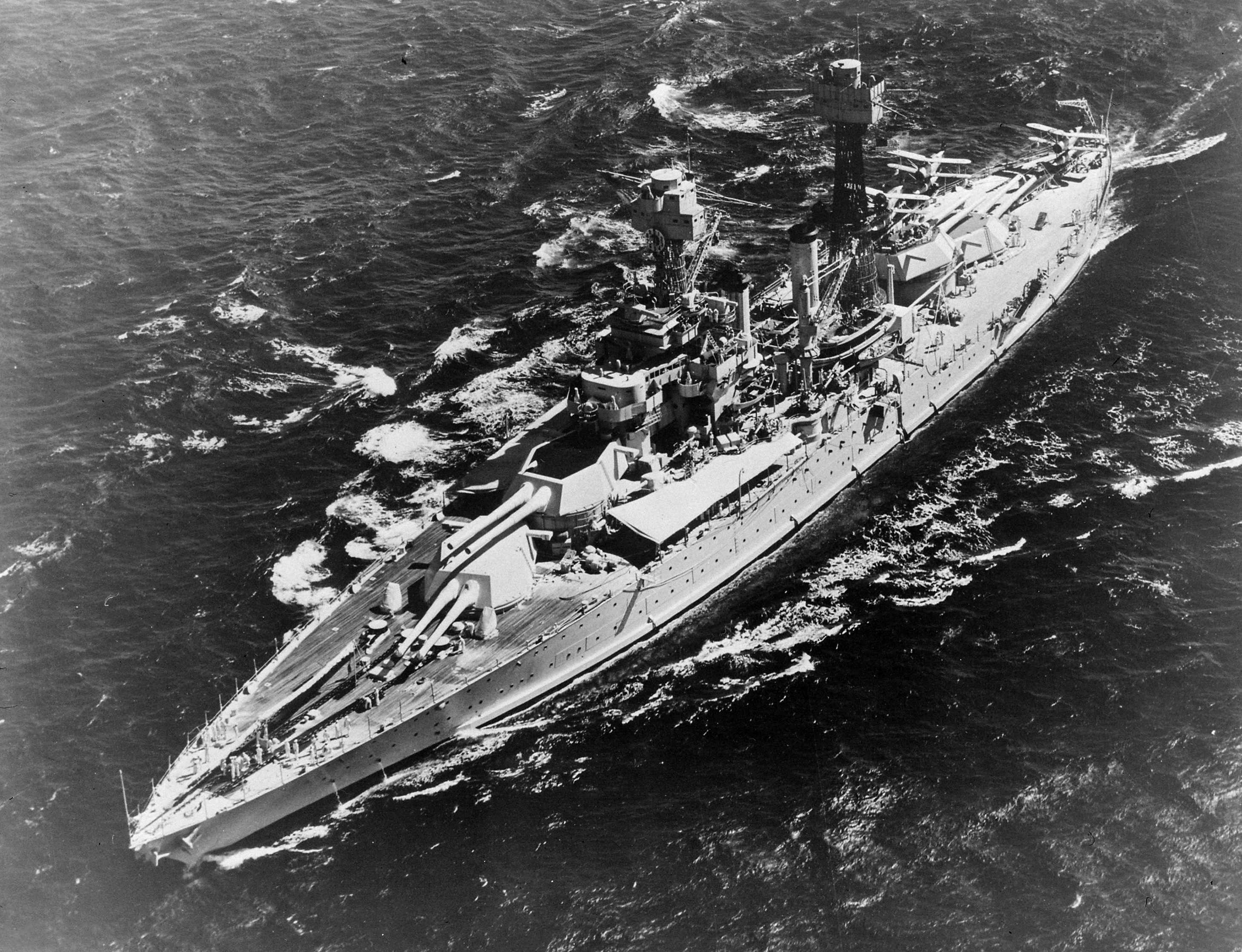
March 20, 1920: "Superdreadnought" USS Maryland becomes U.S. Navy's most powerful weapon

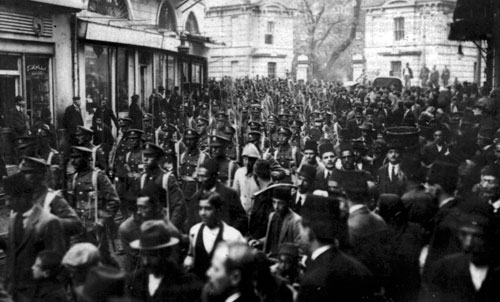
March 15, 1920: Allied troops began occupation of Constantinople to end Ottoman Empire

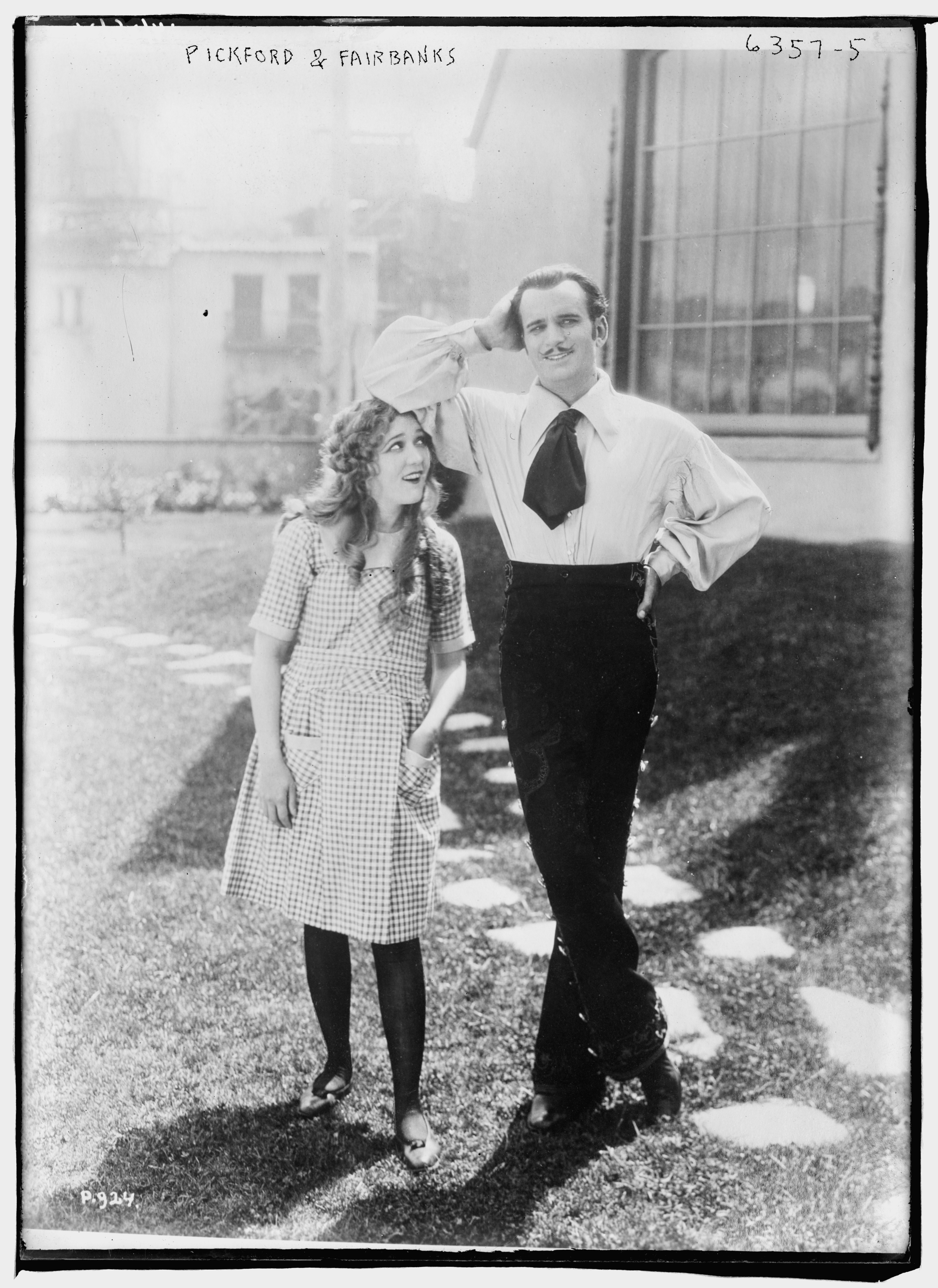
March 28, 1920: Hollywood superstars Mary Pickford and Douglas Fairbanks marry

The following events occurred in March 1920:

== March 1, 1920 (Monday) ==
- Admiral Miklós Horthy, who had commanded the Austro-Hungarian Navy during World War I, then later led the Hungarian Army to defeat the dictatorship of Bela Kun, was elected as the Regent of the Kingdom of Hungary. The National Assembly voted 131 to 9 to approve him until a permanent King of Hungary could be found. Horthy took the oath of regency immediately after the vote.

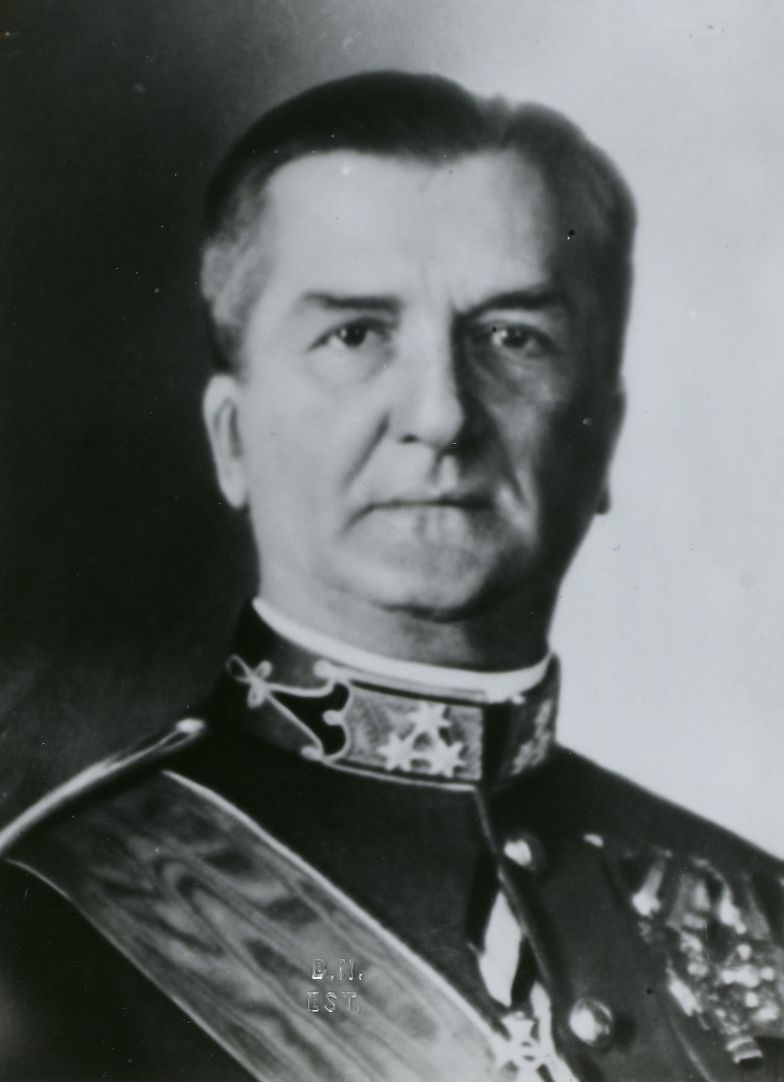
Admiral Horthy

- The Battle of Tel Hai, the first military confrontation between Zionist Jews and Palestinian Arabs, took place when Shi'ite Muslims confronted European Jewish settlers in Northern Galilee in Palestine (now Israel). Although the casualties were limited to eight Zionists and five Palestinians, the example of Tel Hai has become an example in Israeli culture of courage and sacrifice.
- At 12:01 a.m., the United States Railroad Administration returned control of American railroads to its constituent railroad companies. The railroads had been under federal control since 1918 during U.S. participation in World War I.
- France's nationwide railroad strike ended, after a compromise between the government and the Confederation Generale du Travail (CGT) union that no striker would be penalized for disobeying a return-to-work order, and an increase in pay that would not include pay for time on strike.
- By a vote of 4 to 3, the United States Supreme Court decided that the United States Steel Corporation was not a monopoly subject to breakup under U.S. antitrust law. Justices Brandeis and McReynolds did not participate in the case because of a conflict of interest.
- By a margin of 2 to 1, the French Socialist Party convention in Strasbourg elected not to ally itself with the Soviet Communist Party.
- Born: Julian Samora, Mexican American sociologist, helped to pioneer Latino Studies (d. 1996)
- Died:
  - John H. Bankhead, 77, American politician, U.S. Representative and Senator for Alabama, last surviving Confederate Army veteran to serve in Congress (b. 1842)
  - Joseph Trumpeldor, 39, Russian Zionist activist, helped form the Zion Mule Corps to help Russians emigrate to Palestine; killed in the Battle of Tel Hai (b. 1880)

== March 2, 1920 (Tuesday) ==
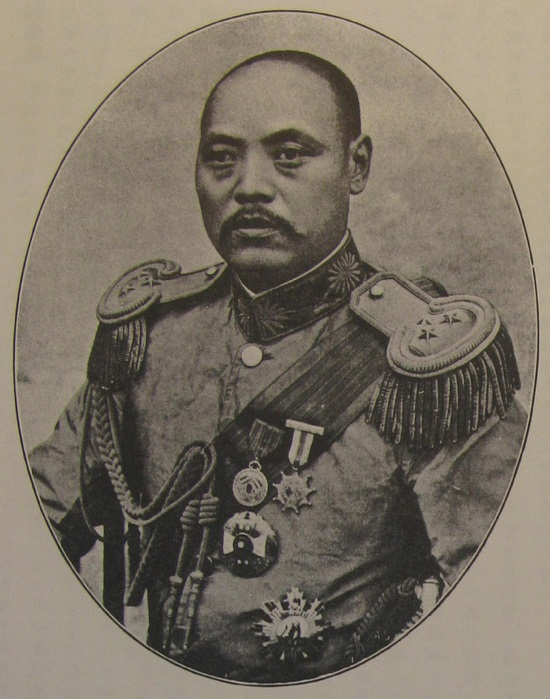
Chin Yun-p'eng

- China's Prime Minister Chin Yun-p'eng resigned after his party continued to insist on negotiating with Japan on rights to China's Shantung peninsula.
- In a city mayoral vote that attracted national attention because one of the two candidates had been a leader of the Seattle General Strike that saw a walkout of most of the U.S. city's labor force, Hugh M. Caldwell was elected Mayor of Seattle, defeating I.W.W. official James A. Duncan by a margin of 40,850 to 34,849. Conservative U.S. newspapers had characterized the vote as a question of "the most momentous issue ever brought to the polls here— that of sovietism."

== March 3, 1920 (Wednesday) ==
- U.S. President Woodrow Wilson, who had not ventured outside of the White House grounds since suffering a stroke in October, went out in public for the first time in 1920, in order to be chauffeured around Washington. President Wilson, accompanied by the First Lady, his physician Rear Admiral Cary T. Grayson, a chauffeur and a pair of Secret Service agents, was driven through Washington, D.C., for about an hour
- The Progressive Party of Canada was founded by Thomas Crerar and 11 other Members of Parliament who were dissatisfied with the Unionist Party. In the 1921 election, the Progressives would win 58 of the 235 seats in the House of Commons. By 1930, the Progressive Party would disband after winning only three seats.
- Born:
  - James Doohan, Canadian-born American actor, best known for his role as Mr. Scott in the original Star Trek television series; in Vancouver (d. 2005)
  - Ronald Searle, British cartoonist; in Cambridge (d. 2011)
- Died: Theodor Philipsen, 79, Danish painter (b. 1840)

== March 4, 1920 (Thursday) ==
- In London, the foreign ministers of the United Kingdom and France agreed upon plans for the dissolution of the Ottoman Empire.
- Born:
  - Bai Yang, Chinese stage, film and TV actress, became one of the nation's most popular film stars; as Yang Chengfang, in Beijing, Republic of China (d. 1996)
  - Morrie Yohai, American food company executive, creator of Cheez Doodles; in Harlem, New York City (d. 2010)
  - Alan MacNaughtan, Scottish stage, film and TV actor; in Bearsden, East Dumbartonshire (d. 2002)
  - Pavel Plotnikov, Soviet military pilot and twice Hero of the Soviet Union'; in Barnaul, RSFSR, Soviet Union) (d. 2000)

== March 5, 1920 (Friday) ==
- South Korea's right-wing daily newspaper, Chosun Ilbo, was first published as a Korean nationalist publication in Japanese Korea.
- The Norwegian government dissolved the Metal Central of the State (the Statens metalcentral) as the import and export crisis eased with the end of World War I. The agency controlled the limited supply of copper and other metals (but not iron or steel) by Norwegian manufacturers during the war and the subsequent recovery.
- France announced its opposition to the Allied plan for rehabilitation of the German economy, on the grounds that the French economy was in greater need of aid because most of World War I had been fought in France rather than in Germany. A United Press reporter paraphrased the French explanation by noting that "France's greatest industrial cities were laid waste and her factories wrecked with typical Teuton thoroughness" while "Germany's industries were little affected by the war because German territory was not invaded extensively."
- Born:
  - Rachel Gurney, English stage, film and TV actress; in Eton, Berkshire (d. 2001)
  - Del Latta, American lawyer and politician, served as the U.S. representative for Ohio for 30 consecutive years from 1959 to 1989; as Delbert Leroy Latt, in Weston, Ohio (d. 2016)
  - Leontine T. Kelly, American clergy, served as the United Methodist Bishop of San Francisco, first African American woman to become a bishop in a major Christian denomination; as Leontine Turpeau, in Washington, D.C. (d. 2012)

== March 6, 1920 (Saturday) ==
- The Anti-Saloon League, which had successfully lobbied U.S. state legislators to pass the 18th Amendment for Prohibition, issued a statement asking that the federal government should buy the more than 60 million gallons (227 million liters) of already-distilled whiskey that remained in bonded warehouses after it could no longer be sold without a prescription, in that "there is a constant temptation to devise ways and means of utilizing that liquor in spite of the law."
- Prime Minister Domingos Leite Pereira of Portugal and his government resigned. António Maria Baptista formed a new cabinet on March 8.
- The upper house of the Netherlands' States General of the Netherlands, the Eerste Kamer, voted 21 to 2 in favor of entry into the League of Nations, following up on the vote in favor cast by the Tweede Kamer on February 19.
- Born: Lewis Gilbert, British film director best known for three James Bond films; in London (d. 2018)

== March 7, 1920 (Sunday) ==
- The First Polish Army was established to serve in the Polish–Soviet War.
- Died: Jaan Poska, 54, first Foreign Minister of Estonia (b. 1866)

== March 8, 1920 (Monday) ==
- The Syrian National Congress proclaimed Syria independent, with Prince Faisal of Hejaz as king.
- Britain's Royal Navy was dispatched to Turkey in order to back up an Allied demand that the Turks cease their persecution of Armenians.
- British Prime Minister David Lloyd George stated in a session of the House of Commons that, despite rumors to the contrary, the British Empire had no intentions of ceding any part of the British West Indies to the United States in settlement of American loans made to the United Kingdom during World War I. By 1920, the British war debt to the U.S., compounded with interest ranging from 3.5% to 5%, was over $4,000,000,000 in United States dollars or almost £1.1 billion in British pounds sterling. The UK was not able to retire the debt for another 95 years, with final payment made on March 9, 2015 The British West Indies included The Bahamas, Jamaica and Barbados, along with a current British Overseas Territory, the British Virgin Islands.
- Born:
  - Ingemar Hedberg, Swedish canoeist, won three gold medals at the 1950 ICF Canoe Sprint World Championships; in Örebro (d. 2019)
  - Douglass Wallop, American novelist and playwright, winner of the 1956 Tony Award for Best Musical, for Damn Yankees; as John Douglass Wallop III, in Washington, D.C. (d. 1985)

== March 9, 1920 (Tuesday) ==
- The New Hampshire primary was held, beginning the 1920 U.S. presidential election campaign, former U.S. Army Chief of Staff Leonard Wood was the top vote recipient among registered Republicans, while the largest number of registered Democrats favored Herbert Hoover, who would win the presidency as a Republican in 1928. Republican Warren G. Harding would win the general election in November 1920.
- Born:
  - Frank Llaneza, American cigar industry baron and tobacco blender; in Tampa (d. 2010)
  - Franjo Mihalić, Yugoslavian Croatian marathon runner, winner of the 1956 Boston Marathon; in Ludina, Kingdom of the Serbs, Croats and Slovenes (present-day Kutina, Croatia) (d. 2015)
- Died: Haralamb Lecca, 47, Romanian playwright and poet (b. 1873)

== March 10, 1920 (Wednesday) ==
- The Canadian fishing trawler FV Jutland departed from Halifax, Nova Scotia, with a crew of 21 people. The next day, one body was found in a lifeboat. FV Jutland and the other 20 crew were never seen again.

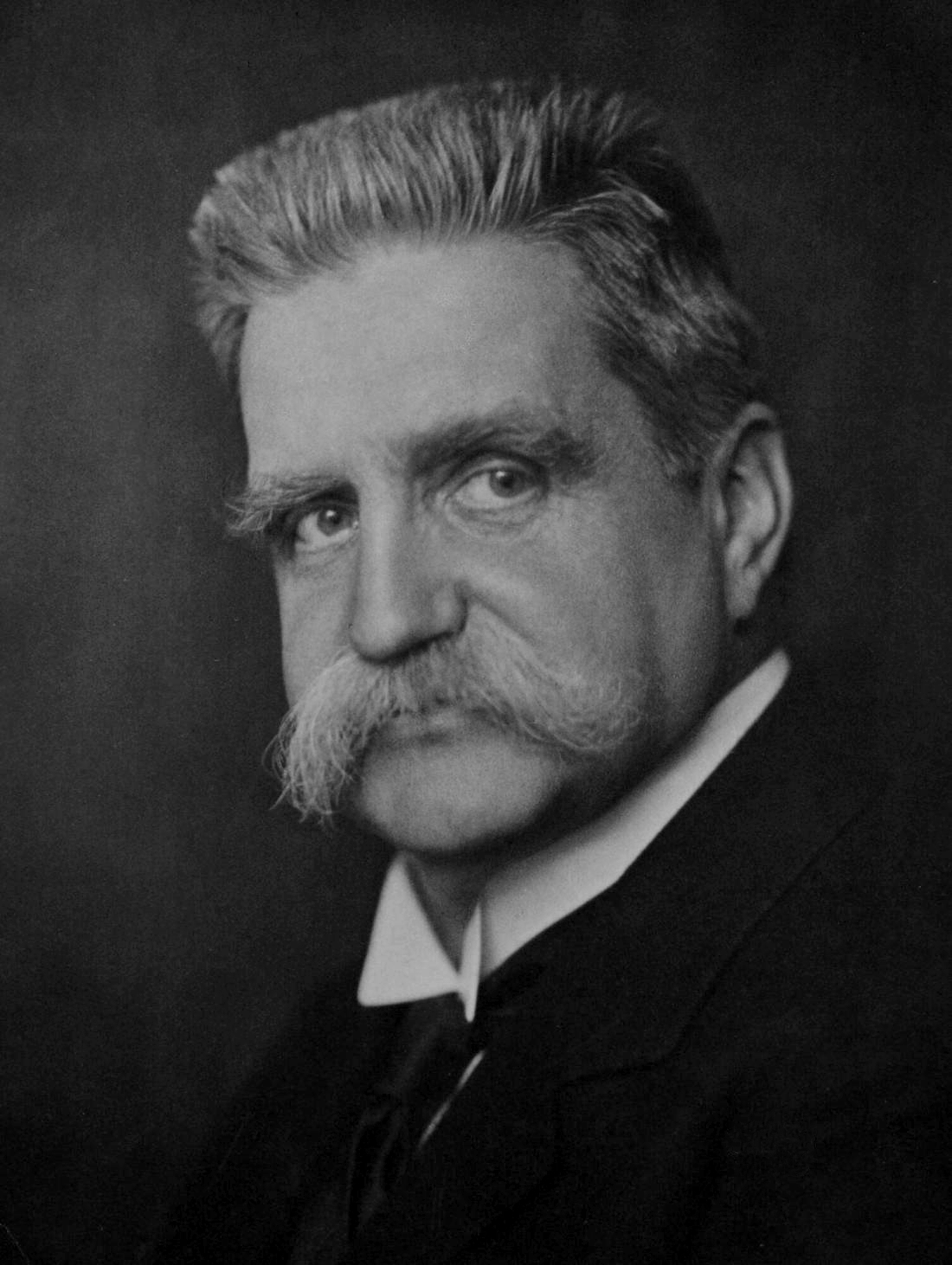
Premier Branting

- The world's first peaceful establishment of a social democratic government took place in Sweden, as Hjalmar Branting took over as Prime Minister when Nils Edén left office.
- West Virginia ratified the 19th Amendment to the U.S. Constitution, permitting universal women's suffrage, by a vote of 16 to 13 in favor One week earlier, the state House of Delegates had approved ratification by a similarly narrow vote of 47 to 40.
- Born:
  - Boris Vian, French novelist, published under the pen-name Vernon Sullivan; in Ville-d'Avray, Hauts-de-Seine departement (d. 1959, cardiac arrest)
  - Alfred Peet, Dutch-born American entrepreneur, founder of Peet's Coffee & Tea; in Alkmaar (d. 2007)

== March 11, 1920 (Thursday) ==
- The Guatemalan Army fired into a crowd of demonstrators against the government of President Manuel Estrada Cabrera, killing a large number of people. Public outrage against the massacre led to the April uprising later called the Semana Tragica, the "tragic week."
- The SS Llay-Llay, a cargo ship, sank off the Chilean coast near Iquique after colliding with the Chilean Navy cruiser General O'Higgins.
- Born:
  - Nicolaas Bloembergen, Dutch-born American physicist, 1981 Nobel Prize in Physics laureate; in Dordrecht (d. 2017)
  - Gérard Tichy, German-born Spanish film actor; as Gerhard Johannes Alexander Tichy Wondzinski, in Weissenfels (d. 1992)
  - Isaac M. Carpenter, American jazz bandleader; in Durham, North Carolina (d. 1998)
- Died: Julio Garavito Armero, 55, Colombian astronomer (b. 1865)

== March 12, 1920 (Friday) ==
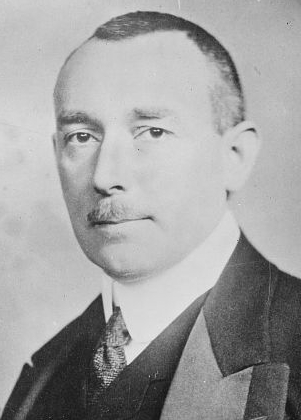
Helfferich

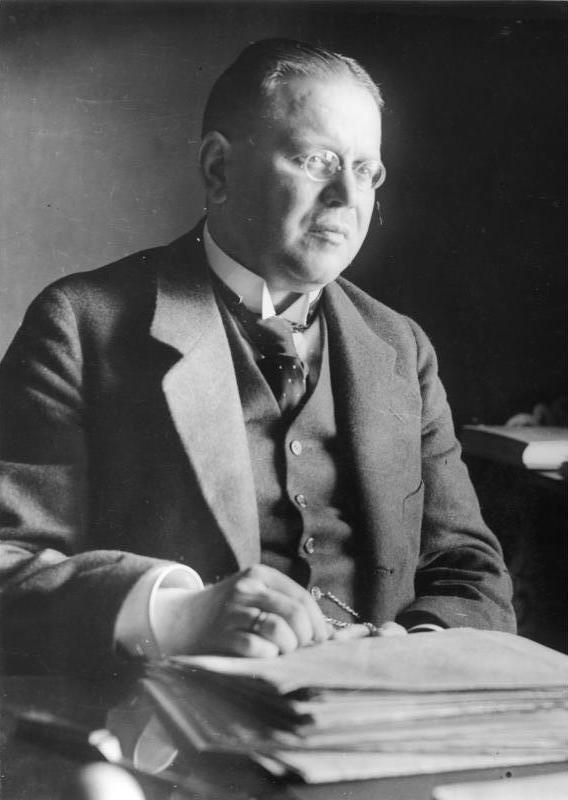
Erzberger

- Japanese soldiers in the besieged Russian city of Nikolayevsk-on-Amur launched a surprise attack on the troops of Soviet Army general Yakov Tryapitsyn rather than to comply with Tryapitsyn's ultimatum to voluntarily surrender their weapons. After three days, most of the Japanese soldiers were dead, and most of the surviving soldiers and civilians would be killed by the Soviet troops.
- Germany's Finance Minister, Matthias Erzberger, resigned after failing in his libel lawsuit against former Vice Chancellor Karl Helfferich. Testimony by Erzberger's witnesses revealed Helfferich's corrupt business practices.
- The Lions Club, founded as an American service organization on June 7, 1917, began its first steps in becoming Lions Clubs International (LCI) with the chartering of the Border Cities Lions Club in Windsor, Ontario, after being successful in 23 U.S. states. By its 100th anniversary, LCI would have 1.4 million members in clubs in more than 200 nations.
- The U.S. Navy submarine USS H-1 ended its service when it ran aground on a shoal off of Santa Margarita Island in California. Four men, including H-1's commanding officer Lieutenant Commander James R. Webb, were killed while they tried to reach shore, and the wreckage of H-1 sank after it was pulled off the shoal on March 24. Lt. Comm. Webb was washed overboard by a wave while guiding his men, and sailors H. S. Delmarine, Harry W. Gilles and Joseph Kauffman were found to be missing when the other 22 surviving crew reached the shore.
- Died: Edward P. McCabe, 69, American settler, attorney and land agent who became one of the first African Americans to hold a major political office in the American Old West, serving from 1883 to 1887 as the Kansas State Auditor (b. 1850)

== March 13, 1920 (Saturday) ==
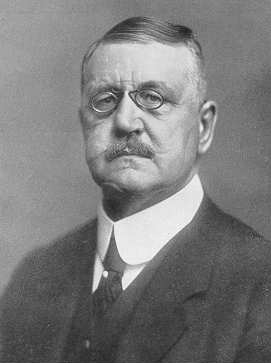
Kapp

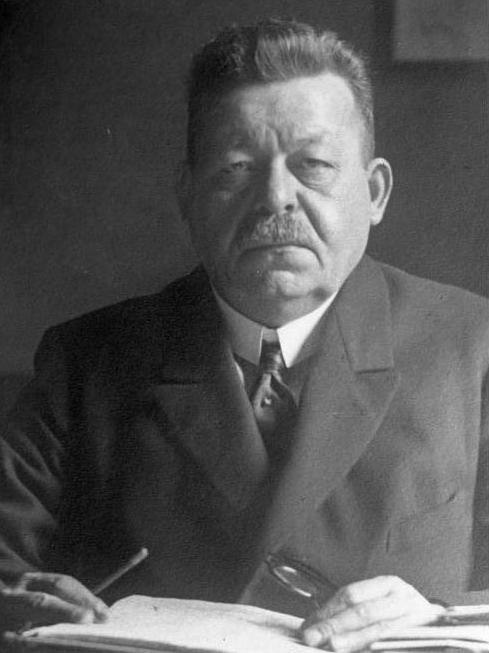
Ebert

- Dr. Wolfgang Kapp was the nominal leader of an attempted coup in Germany known as the Kapp Putsch that briefly ousted the government of the Weimar Republic of President Ebert in Berlin. Dr. Kapp, co-founder of the Fatherland Party, proclaimed himself as Chancellor of Germany. President Friedrich Ebert and Chancellor Gustav Bauer fled their offices at Berlin at 1:00 in the morning and traveled to Dresden, but not before Ebert issued a proclamation calling on the German public to call a general strike and to resist the putsch. German union leaders responded with general strike, and President Ebert re-established his government at Stuttgart. The general strike helped lead to the collapse of Dr. Kapp's coup.
- Murmansk, a Russian port city on the Barents Sea, surrendered to the Soviet Union after having resisted the Bolshevik Army for more than two years
- Alexandru Averescu was named as the new Prime Minister of Romania, the day after Alexandru Vaida-Voevod was fired by King Ferdinand I.
- A jury in Centralia, Illinois, convicted seven members of the Industrial Workers of the World (I.W.W.) for conspiracy and murder of U.S. war veterans in 1919. Three other defendants were acquitted, including one by reason of insanity.
- Born:
  - Evelio Otero Sr., Cuban-born Puerto Rican journalist, first television anchorman in Puerto Rico; in Santiago de Cuba (d. 1988)
  - Ralph J. Roberts, American businessman, co-founder of Comcast; in New York City (d. 2015)

== March 14, 1920 (Sunday) ==
- At a referendum, residents of the lower portion of Schleswig voted overwhelmingly in favor of continuing to be part of Germany. Residents of the upper portion had voted in favor of joining Denmark in February.
- Born: Hank Ketcham, American cartoonist, creator of the Dennis the Menace comic strip; in Seattle (d. 2001)
- Died: Nikolai Korotkov, 46, Russian physician, pioneer of vascular surgery, died from tuberculosis (b. 1874)

== March 15, 1920 (Monday) ==
- Constantinople was occupied by British Empire forces, acting for the Allied against the Turkish National Movement, without opposition. Retrospectively, the Grand National Assembly of Turkey would regard this as the dissolution of the Ottoman regime in Istanbul.
- By a vote of 56 to 26, the U.S. Senate approved most of the Treaty of Versailles, but substituted a compromise version of Article X of the Treaty.
- British Prime Minister Lloyd George announced in the House of Commons that the Allies had come to an agreement on mandates for the disposition of many of the German Empire's former African and Pacific Ocean colonies. German East Africa (Deutsch-Ostafrika), which would later become the nations of Tanganyika (now mainland Tanzania, Rwanda and Burundi), was assigned to the UK. German South West Africa (Deutsch-Südwestafrika), now Namibia, was assigned to South Africa. In the Pacific, New Zealand, was assigned a mandate for German Samoa (now Samoa); Australia was to receive the other colonies south of the Equator and Japan was to receive those north of the Equator.
- For the first time in American history, the office of the U.S. Secretary of State was vacant, as Frank Polk completed his service as Acting Secretary, limited by law to 30 days after the firing of Robert Lansing. "Until the office is filled," a news report noted, "no one can leave the United States for a foreign country because there is no one to sign passports" (which were limited to the duration of the time outside the U.S.). "Scores of congressmen discovered this today when they sought to get passports to Europe, Cuba, South America, and other places for constituents." The crisis continued for a week until the Senate confirmed the new nominee, Bainbridge Colby.
- The Ruhr Red Army, a communist paramilitary group of 60,000 men, was formed in Germany.
- Born:
  - E. Donnall Thomas, American physician, 1990 recipient of the Nobel Prize in Physiology or Medicine for his development of bone marrow transplantation as a treatment of leukemia; as Edward Donnall Thomas, in Mart, Texas (d. 2012)
  - Lawrence Sanders, American novelist and short story writer; in Brooklyn, New York City (d. 1998)
  - Kim Sang-ok, South Korean poet; in Tongyeong, Chōsen, Empire of Japan (now South Korea) (d. 2004)
- Died:
  - Rudolf Berthold, 28, German flying ace of World War I, later organized a Freikorps; killed in a clash with union members in Hamburg (b. 1891)
  - George Louis Beer, 47, American historian (b. 1872)

== March 16, 1920 (Tuesday) ==
- British troops in India fired on a mob of strikers at Jamshedpur.
- Hazel Miner, a 15-year-old student in Center, North Dakota, died from hypothermia while protecting her younger brother and sister in a blizzard that killed 34 people. During the 1920s, Hazel's story would spread through the United States and she would obtain posthumous fame.
- Born:
  - Leo McKern, Australian actor, best known as the title character and lead actor in Rumpole of the Bailey; as Reginald McKern, in Sydney (d. 2002)
  - Sid Fleischmann, American novelist and children's author; as Avron Zalmon Fleischmann, in Brooklyn, New York City (d. 2010)
- Died: Joseph Apukai Akina, 63, Hawaiian lawyer, served in last session of the Kingdom of Hawaii's House of Representatives, first Speaker of the Assembly in the Territory of Hawaii House of Representatives (b. 1856)

== March 17, 1920 (Wednesday) ==
- The tomb of Meket-Re, the chief minister for the Egyptian pharaoh Mentuhotep II, was discovered almost 3,900 years after he was buried. The tomb was located in a valley south of Deir el-Bahari, part of the Theban Necropolis across the Nile River from Thebes near Luxor.
- Four days after declaring himself Chancellor of Germany in an attempted coup, Wolfgang Kapp resigned along with General von Luettwitz.
- U.S. President Wilson allowed news photographers to take pictures and films of him for the first time since his stroke in October. The president ordered the chauffeur of the open convertible limousine to slow down as it entered the southwest entrance to the White House grounds in order to accommodate the journalists.
- The sinking of the French cargo ship SS Cadrier in the English Channel killed 19 of the ship's 23 crew.
- Born:
  - Sheikh Mujibur Rahman, Bangladeshi politician and revolutionary, first President of Bangladesh, led East Pakistan's secession from Pakistan; in Tungipara, Bengal Province, British India (present-day Bangladesh) (d. 1975, assassinated)
  - Manuel Zapata Olivella, Colombian anthropologist and writer; in Santa Cruz de Lorica (d. 2004)
  - George B. Hartzog Jr., American conservationist, Director of the National Park Service from 1964 to 1972; in Smoaks, South Carolina (d. 2008)

== March 18, 1920 (Thursday) ==
- Allied occupational forces in Turkey, under the command of the British Army's Marshal George Milne, entered the Ottoman capital. Former Grand Vizier Mehmet Talaat Pasha and former nationalist leader Mehmet Esat Bülkat were both arrested and imprisoned by the occupying forces.
- Born: Willy F. James, Jr., African American U.S. Army private first class, awarded the Medal of Honor more than 50 years after being killed in action; in Kansas City, Missouri (d. 1945, killed in action)
- Died: Franz Büchner, 22, one of Germany's most successful flying aces during World War I; killed during reconnaissance mission over Leipzig looking for members of the Spartacus League Communist organization (b. 1898)

== March 19, 1920 (Friday) ==
- The United States Senate failed to ratify the Treaty of Versailles, a move which rejected U.S. entry into the League of Nations. The vote was 49 for and 35 against, seven short of the necessary two-thirds majority. President Wilson had announced in advance that he would not sign any ratification of the resolution by U.S. Senator Henry Cabot Lodge for an amended version of Article X of the treaty, a factor in the failure of the Senate to join. The American press generally condemned the failure of the treaty and disagreed as to whether Republican U.S. senators or the Democrat president were to blame. The New York Times commented that "Mr. Lodge has been beaten at his own game, a most despicable deadly game" while the New York World faulted President Wilson saying that "The inefficiency, all-sufficiency and self-sufficiency of our self-named and only negotiator created a bedevilment whose waves never could be disquieted... he was able to command enough senators to drive a knife into the heart of his own work."
- Germany surrendered five warships to United States control under the terms of the 1918 Armistice, including the battleship SMS Ostfriesland and the light cruiser SMS Frankfurt.
- Born:
  - Kjell Aukrust, Norwegian novelist artist; in Alvdal) (d. 2002)
  - Paul Hagen, Danish film and TV actor, best known as a regular for the Danish TV series Huset på Christianshavn; in Copenhagen (d. 2003)

== March 20, 1920 (Saturday) ==
- With Wolfgang Kapp's coup having failed, German President Ebert, returned from Stuttgart to Berlin, but former Chancellor Bauer did not. Ebert was accompanied by first chancellor, Philipp Scheidemann, sparking rumors that Scheidemann would be asked to head the post-coup government.
- U.S. Senator Truman Newberry of Michigan was found guilty of excessive use of campaign funds in his 1918 election campaign. The U.S. Supreme Court would later reverse the conviction, and Newberry would be allowed to take his seat, but he would resign in 1922 under further investigation of his qualifications.
- USS Maryland, the first of the new "superdreadnought" Colorado-class battleships, was launched from Norfolk, Virginia. Armed with eight 16-inch (406mm) guns, it and the other two Colorado-class ships would be the U.S. Navy's most powerful vessels for almost 20 years. USS Colorado, for whom the class was named, would not be launched until 1921.
- In Ireland, Thomas MacCurtain, the Lord Mayor of Cork, was assassinated in a home invasion when a group of gunmen shot him in his bedroom, then fled.
- Born:
  - Pamela Harriman, English-born American diplomat, served as U.S. Ambassador to France from 1993 until her death in 1997; as Pamela Digby, in Farnborough, Hampshire (d. 1997)
  - Rosemary Timperley, British novelist, short story writer, and screenwriter; in London (d. 1988)
  - Qemal Stafa, Albanian politician and freedom fighter, cofounder of the Albanian Communist Party; in Elbasan, Principality of Albania (d. 1942, killed by Italian occupational forces)
  - Yaakov Banai, Polish-born Zionist guerrilla, officer of the Israeli Defense Forces; as Jacob Tunkel, in Baranowicze, Poland (present-day Baranavichy, Belarus) (d. 2009)
  - Felix Ziegel, Soviet astronomer and UFO researcher; in Moscow, Russian SFSR (d. 1988)

== March 21, 1920 (Sunday) ==
- Georgy Chicherin, the Soviet Union's Commissar for Foreign Affairs, informed Finland that the Soviets would cease further attacks.
- Died: Evelina Haverfield, 52, British suffragette (b. 1867)

== March 22, 1920 (Monday) ==
- Washington became the 35th U.S. state to ratify the 19th Amendment to the U.S. Constitution, permitting women the right to vote nationwide. The vote in favor of ratification was unanimous in the state house of representatives, and the state senate followed suit. With 35 states having ratified, only one more was necessary for the 19th Amendment to become part of the U.S. Constitution, but it would take almost five months before Tennessee would become the 36th state on August 18, 1920.
- Bainbridge Colby was confirmed by the Senate as the new U.S. Secretary of State, replacing Robert Lansing. "The confirmation to-day was not unanimous," the New York Tribune noted, reporting that "No record vote was had, but several Senators answered in the negative on a viva voce vote."
- In a postseason best-of-three college basketball championship title series, between the best eastern team (the 19-0 University of Pennsylvania Quakers) and the best western team (the 10-2 University of Chicago Maroons) the Maroons handed the Quakers their first loss of the season, winning 28 to 24 before a crowd of 3,600 at the Chicago campus's Bartlett Gymnasium. At halftime, Chicago led Penn, 18–3. Penn staged a furious comeback attempt but was never able to take the lead. The series moved to Philadelphia for Game 2 on March 25.
- Born:
  - Werner Klemperer, German-born American actor, winner of two Emmy Awards for his role as "Colonel Klink" in the 1960s comedy Hogan's Heroes; in Cologne, Germany) (d. 2000)
  - Ross Martin, Polish-born American actor, known for his role as "Artemus Gordon" in the 1960s adventure show The Wild Wild West; as Martin Rosenblatt, in Grodek, Poland (present-day Horodok, Ukraine) (d. 1981)
  - Josip Manolić, Croatian politician, first Prime Minister of Croatia after its 1991 separation from Yugoslavia; in Kalinovac, Kingdom of the Serbs, Croats and Slovenes (present-day Croatia) (d. 2024)
  - Gilbert Plass, Canadian physicist, one of the first scientists to make the connection between atmospheric carbon dioxide and global warming during the 1950s; in Toronto (d. 2004)

== March 23, 1920 (Tuesday) ==
- Azerbaijan troops carried out the burning of the Armenian half of the town of Shusha and the massacre of its population, after the Armenians had failed in an uprising against the Azerbaijan Democratic Republic. At least 500, and perhaps as many as 30,000 civilians were killed over four days and 2,000 homes were destroyed.
- The drapery hook, now universal in homes with curtains, was patented by its inventor, James William McGhee, who had applied for the patent less than a year earlier.
- Retired General Leonard Wood won his third presidential primary, as approved by Republican voters in South Dakota, while former U.S. Ambassador to Germany James W. Gerard was the winner of the Democratic primary.
- By executive order, U.S. President Wilson abolished further price-fixing of coal by the government.
- Born:
  - Tetsuharu Kawakami, Japanese baseball player, three time Japan leagues MVP, five-time batting champion and inductee into Japanese Baseball Hall of Fame; in Hitoyoshi, Kumamoto (d. 2013)
  - Barbara Low, English-American biochemist; in Lancaster, Lancashire (d. 2019)
  - Neal Edward Smith, American politician, U.S. Representative for Iowa for 18 consecutive terms, from 1959 until 1995; in Hedrick, Iowa (d. 2021)

== March 24, 1920 (Wednesday) ==
- Syria's King Faisal issued an ultimatum for the French Army to leave Syria and the British Army to withdraw from Palestine by April the 6th. British Prime Minister David Lloyd George replied that the Allies did not recognize Faisal as the rightful king.
- The town of East Brookfield, Massachusetts, the last municipality to be founded in the state, was incorporated by vote of the state Senate.
- Born:
  - Corbin Harney, elder and spiritual leader of the Newe (Western Shoshone) people; in Bruneau, Idaho (d. 2007)
  - Mary Stolz, American children's and young adult's author; as Mary Slattery, in Boston (d. 2006)
- Died:
  - Mrs. Humphry Ward, 68, British novelist and founding president of the Women's National Anti-Suffrage League (b. 1851)
  - William J. Browning, 69, American Politician, U.S. Representative from New Jersey from 1911 to 1920; collapsed and died of a heart attack after getting a shave and haircut inside the U.S. Capitol barber shop. Reportedly, he joked with the barber, "Well, it will probably be the last chance you'll ever get to shave me." (b. 1850)
  - Maria Antonietta Torriani, 80, Italian journalist and author who published under the pen name Marchesa Colombi (b. 1840)

== March 25, 1920 (Thursday) ==
- British recruits to the Royal Irish Constabulary began arriving in Ireland to maintain order during the Irish War of Independence. They would become known from their improvised uniforms as the "Black and Tans".
- Penn evened the national college basketball title series with a 29 to 18 win over Chicago on the Quakers' home court at Weightman Hall in Philadelphia, requiring a third game in the best-of-three event.
- Born:
  - Patrick Troughton, British actor, starred as the second reincarnation of the Doctor on the television series Doctor Who from 1966 to 1969; in Mill Hill, Middlesex (d. 1987)
  - John Barnes, educational film and documentary producer; in Belford, New Jersey (d. 2000)

== March 26, 1920 (Friday) ==
- This Side of Paradise, the first of F. Scott Fitzgerald's novels, was published by Scribner's. It became a bestseller, and launched Fitzgerald's success.
- The German government asked France for permission to use its own troops against the rebellious Ruhr Red Army, in the French-occupied Ruhr region.
- In Poplar Bluff, Missouri, James Jackson survived the first hanging in the state since its revival of capital punishment in 1919. Jackson was an African-American convicted of the sexual assault of a white woman. Having climbed the scaffold at the Butler County, Missouri jail, when the trap door was sprung, the rope broke and he dropped to the ground. After he regained consciousness, Jackson asked that the second hanging attempt be done quickly, and the second execution took place less than half an hour later.
- Born:
  - Rose Cousins, American aviator, first African American woman to become a solo pilot in the Civilian Pilot Training Program; in Fairmont, West Virginia (d. 2006)
  - Junius Scales, American Communist, leader of the Communist Party of the United States of America, arrested and convicted under the Smith Act in the 1950s; in Greensboro, North Carolina (d. 2002)
- Died:
  - William Moore Davis, 90, American landscape painter (b. 1829)
  - W. C. Minor, 85, American surgeon, contributor to the Oxford English Dictionary, convicted of murder in England (b. 1834)
  - Samuel Colman, 88, American landscape painter (b. 1832)

== March 27, 1920 (Saturday) ==
- Germany was found to be in violation of the limitations imposed upon it under the Treaty of Versailles, which limited its army to no more than 204 guns and no airplanes at all. The German Luftwaffe had 6,000 airplanes and the military had 12,000 guns.
- Herman Muller formed a new cabinet as Chancellor of Germany, serving as Foreign Minister as well.
- The Penn Quakers narrowly won the 1919-1920 college basketball championship, defeating the University of Chicago Maroons, 23 to 21, in the third and deciding game held at Princeton University.
- Born:
  - Robin Jacques, English book illustrator; in London (d. 1995)
  - Tex Moncrief, American oil billionaire; in Fort Worth (d. 2021)

== March 28, 1920 (Sunday) ==
- On Palm Sunday, 380 people in the United States were killed by a series of 37 tornadoes that swept through the eastern half of the United States, from Illinois to Georgia. Heaviest hit was Troup County, Georgia, which was struck at 5:45 in the evening local time, killing 27 people in LaGrange alone, and over 100 elsewhere in the county. Indiana and Ohio both suffered more than 50 deaths each.
- France's Chamber of Deputies voted 518 to 70 in favor of confidence in Prime Minister Millerand.
- Popular movie stars Mary Pickford and Douglas Fairbanks were married at a private ceremony in Los Angeles, a little less than a month after her March 2 divorce from Owen Moore.
- Died: Elmer Apperson, 58, pioneer automobile manufacturer, co-founded the Apperson Brothers Motor Company with his younger brother, Edgar

== March 29, 1920 (Monday) ==
- King Christian X of Denmark demanded and received the resignation of Prime Minister Carl Zahle and Zahle's entire cabinet. Zahle declined to continue operating the government until a new cabinet could replace him, and the king asked Otto Liebe to form a new cabinet. As news of the dismissal spread, angry crowds assembled in Copenhagen to protest the King's action and demanded that Denmark become a republic. King Christian then agreed to meet with a group of Socialist deputies and promised to give a reply to their demands by 9:30 the next morning and rejected demands to reinstate the Zahle ministry, prompting trade unions to declare a general strike.
- William Robertson was promoted to Field Marshal, the first man to rise from private to the highest rank in the British Army.
- The Irish Home Rule bill passed its first reading in Parliament.
- Born:
  - Alene Duerk, American naval officer, first woman to attain the rank of admiral in the U.S. Navy; in Defiance, Ohio (d. 2018)
  - Hajime Toyoshima, Japanese airman, helped lead the Cowra breakout, the largest prisoner of war escape of World War II; in Kagawa Prefecture (d. 1944, killed during escape)
  - John Palladino, pioneering American recording engineer and record company producer; in Ashley, Pennsylvania (d. 2014)
  - Marion Mann, American physician, Dean of the Howard University College of Medicine from 1970 to 1979; in Atlanta (d. 2022)
  - Gottfried Weilenmann, Swiss professional cyclist, winner of the Tour de Suisse; in Amriswil, Switzerland (d. 2018)
  - Theodore Trautwein, American judge; in Paramus, New Jersey (d. 2000)

== March 30, 1920 (Tuesday) ==
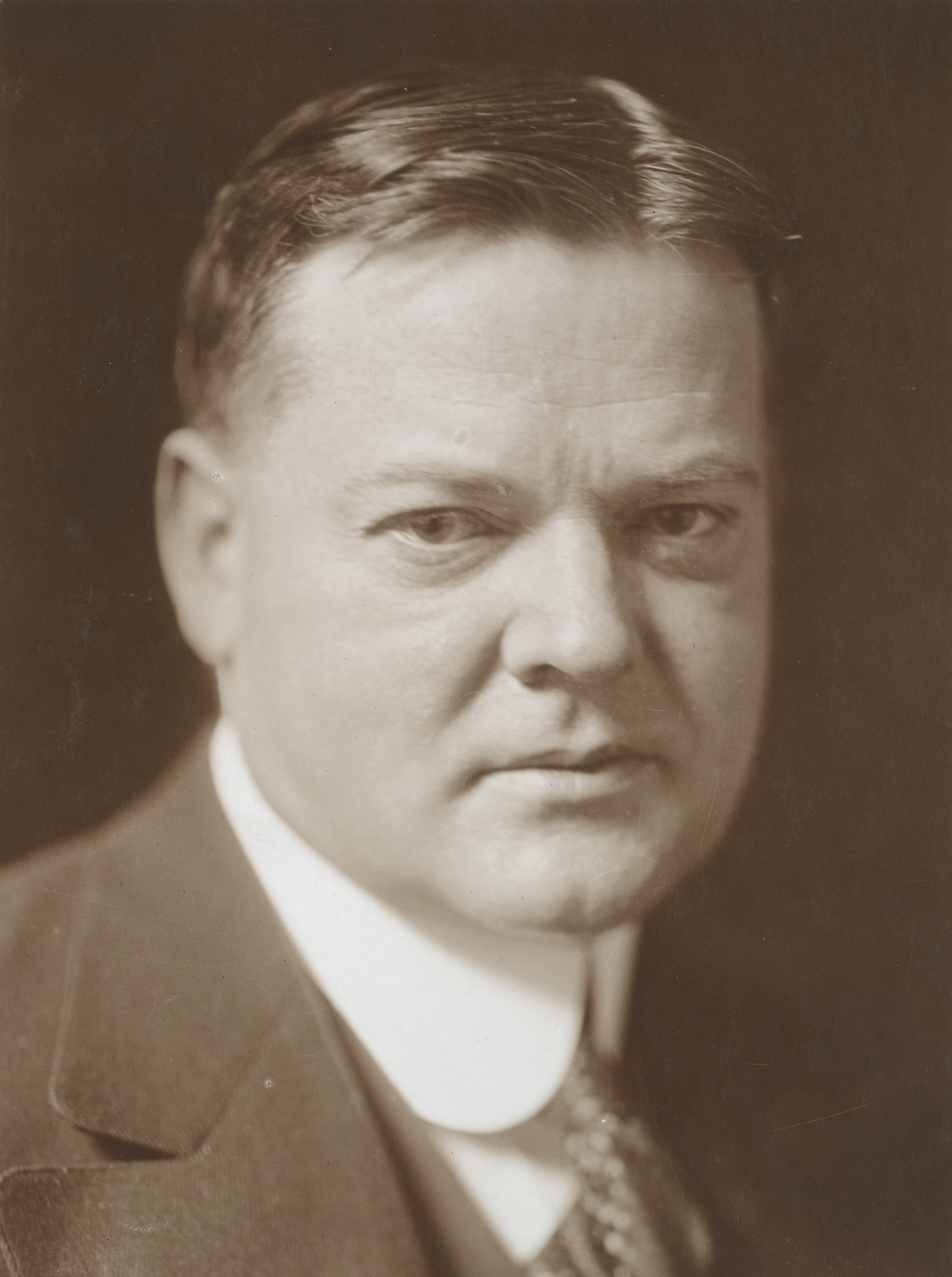
Herbert Hoover

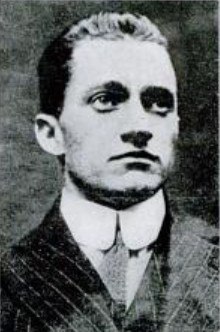
Grover Bergdoll

- Former U.S. war relief administrator Herbert Hoover, who had been placed on the ballot by supporters in both Democrat and Republican presidential primaries, formally announced that he would run for the Republican Party nomination for President of the United States. Hoover announced his decision in a lengthy telegram sent to the chairman of a "Hoover for President" club in California.
- Grover Bergdoll, known as "the millionaire draft dodger", began a five-year prison sentence for desertion at Fort Jay in New York. He would serve only five months before escaping in August while being allowed to visit his mansion in Philadelphia.

== March 31, 1920 (Wednesday) ==
- The House of Commons passed the second reading of the Irish Home Rule bill by a vote of 348 to 94, clearing the way for a third and final reading for approval, but United Kingdom Prime Minister David Lloyd George declared that demands for self-determination would not be granted. "I know this bill is accepted by no considerable section of the Irish people," Lloyd George said. "If you ask the great majority of the Irish what they will accept, they will say 'We want independence and an Irish republic. In these circumstances it is of no use to talk about self-determination. If we use these words we mean going to the full length of an Irish republic, and that will never be tolerated by Great Britain." The United Kingdom's Chief Secretary for Ireland, Ian Macpherson, resigned the next day.
- Born:
  - Marga Minco, Netherlands journalist, novelist, and Holocaust survivor; as Sara Menco, in Ginneken en Bavel (d. 2023)
  - Howard A. Anderson Jr., American cinematographer and visual effects artist; in Los Angeles (d. 2015)
- Died:
  - Paul Bachmann, 82, German mathematician (b. 1837)
  - Lothar von Trotha, 71, German army officer and colonial governor of German South West Africa (b. 1848)
  - Charles H. Ilgenfritz, 83, American Civil War Veteran, Medal of Honor recipient (b. 1837)
