= Wilhelm Schlombs =

German architect

Wilhelm Schlombs (April 24, 1920 in Cologne – August 25, 1993) was a German architect and church builder. As Cologne Erzdiözesanbaumeister he was largely responsible for the reconstruction of the historic church building in the Archdiocese of Cologne after World War II. Its greatest merit is the rebuilding of the great Twelve Romanesque churches of Cologne.

Wilhelm Schlombs was born on 24 April 1920 in Cologne. As a returned soldier discharged shortly after the end of World War II, he participated with the city curator Hans Vogt in the salvage of damaged monuments. Subsequently, he studied architecture at the RWTH Aachen and was afterwards for a short time at Cologne's Building Surveyor. Schlombs was named Erzdiözesanbaumeister of the Diocesan Building Authority until his retirement in 1985. Prof. Dr. Wilhelm Schlombs died on 25 August 1993. Schlombs was married from 1949 until his death to Irmgard Schlombs, née Luebke. Together they had five daughters. One of his daughters, Dr. Adele Schlombs, has been director of the Museum of East Asian Art in Cologne since 1991.

In addition to restoring towed churches damaged during the war, he campaigned for the modern church. This led to numerous church building projects, particularly in Eastern Europe and East Asia, such as the Cathedral of Tokyo. He especially loved the former Jesuit church of St. Mary's Assumption of Cologne, and is responsible for the reconstruction of the original equipment. In 1981 he founded the "Friends of Romanesque churches of Cologne," and in 1985 initiated the "Year of the Romanesque churches," the climax and conclusion of his active service. The Church of St. Mary Queen of Peace in Pulheim Dansweiler 1952/53 has been built according to his plans.
