= Diet Eman =

Dutch resistance member (1920–2019)

- Born: April 30, 1920; The Hague, Netherlands
- Died: September 3, 2019 (aged 99); Grand Rapids, Michigan, U.S.
- Occupations: Resistance hero during World War II and author

Berendina Roeloffina Hendrika (Diet) Eman (April 30, 1920 – September 3, 2019) was a Dutch resistance worker during World War II and author of the book Things We Couldn't Say.

== War experience ==
Eman grew up in a middle-class, business-owning, Christian family in The Hague. Her wartime experience began on May 10, 1940, when she awoke in the night to the sound of aircraft battle; she knew immediately that this meant Hitler's forces had invaded the Netherlands despite promises otherwise. Her brother-in-law, in fact, was killed the first day. Immediately, Eman began her work against the Nazi regime: she and her fiancé, Hein Sietsma, established a resistance group with friends.

Initially, Eman's resistance group listened to forbidden BBC war news broadcasts and spread the information to as many people as possible. These efforts grew, however, as the Nazi regime began enacting antisemitic laws. Eman soon worked to find a place to hide for a friend being threatened with "relocation," meaning movement to a concentration camp. This action spiraled into relocating 60 people in safe houses in cities as well as rural areas. Because of the large number of Jews fleeing persecution, Eman was routinely confronted with the problem of housing too many individuals in one place, which was even more dangerous in an urban setting. To try to alleviate this challenge, Eman continually delivered, by bicycle and trains, false ID papers as well as extra ration cards to those who needed these resources. She also carried personal mail to and from evacuees' families, who dared not leave their tiny confined spaces nor receive official postal mail. She also helped launder evacuees' money as it was recalled for newer-issued banknotes.

Despite Eman's efforts at discretion and strategy, the Gestapo soon discovered her identity and her connection to resistance work. Fearing arrest, she fled from her home to a family on a dairy farm named Watergoor where she found refuge and a new identity. At this new location, her resistance work continued; she even tracked Nazi troop movements and stores of military equipment. On April 26, 1944, her fiance Sietsma was arrested; this once again jeopardized Eman's identity and she changed her name again. Eman now had a premonition of her own arrest. Despite these ill feelings, she kept working with the resistance. Unfortunately, her premonition proved to be true.

While traveling by train, Eman was asked for her ID, which was immediately identified as fake. Removed from the train for questioning, Eman knew she would be questioned and the pack of illegal documents she was carrying would be discovered, leading to her arrest and even death. Thankfully, at the last moment, Eman had a chance to dispose of the documents at a busy station when the officers were distracted by one of the men's new plastic raincoat, a novelty at the time. Eman was still taken to prison in Scheveningen because of her fake ID, and on to the Vught concentration camp for questioning, where she met the celebrated Corrie and Betsie ten Boom. At the concentration camp, Eman was assigned to work in the laundry; she was very distraught at having to scrub the bloodied clothes of civilian prisoners who were executed nightly by SS men, and she had a total emotional breakdown.

Soon it was time for Eman's trial. Because she had so thoroughly remembered her false identity, and pretended to be a simple, naive housemaid, she was released and survived until the end of the Nazi regime, continuing her secret delivery work under increasingly impoverished conditions. Her fiancé Hein Sietsma, however, died at the Dachau concentration camp in January 1945.

== After the war ==
Eman received thanks from numerous leaders for her efforts, including General Eisenhower in 1946 and President Ronald Reagan in 1982. She was awarded the Righteous Among Nations award in 1998 by Yad Vashem.

Eman left the Netherlands after the war worked as a nurse for Shell Oil in Venezuela where she met Egon Erlich. She married Egon, moved to Manhattan, and had two children Mark Aryeh Erlich and Joy Coe. She did not speak about her resistance work until 1978. That year, she spoke at a "Suffering and Survival" convention. There she met Dr. James Schaap who worked with Eman to write her memoir, Things We Couldn't Say, which was published in 1994.

Eman lived in Grand Rapids, Michigan. In April 2016, a local ballet troop in Grand Rapids performed "It Is Well," the story of Eman's wartime experiences. Eman was even present in the audience for her 96th birthday, when the dancers sang her the Dutch birthday song "Lang zal ze leven (Long shall she live)." Eman died September 3, 2019, in Grand Rapids, Michigan, aged 99.
