= List of shipwrecks in January 1890 =

The list of shipwrecks in January 1890 includes ships sunk, foundered, grounded, or otherwise lost during January 1890.

== 1 January ==
List of shipwrecks: 1 January 1890
Ship	State	Description
Arethusa	United Kingdom	The steamship ran aground off the Carbonera Lighthouse, Spain. She was refloated.
Claudian, and Persian Monarch	United Kingdom	The Thames barge Claudian was run into by the steamship Persian Monarch and sank in the River Thames at Woolwich, London. Persian Monarch was beached.
Ocanmo	United Kingdom	The steamship ran aground in the River Thames at Tripcock Point.
Persia	Italy	The steamship was driven ashore near Aléria, Corsica, France. Her 140 passengers were taken off, the crew refusing to leave. She was on a voyage from Livorno to La Maddelena.
Poonah	United Kingdom	The steamship caught fire at Barry, Glamorgan. The fire was extinguished.
William Davison	United Kingdom	The steamship collided with the steamship Anglesea (United Kingdom) at Dublin and was severely damaged.

== 2 January ==
List of shipwrecks: 2 January 1890
Ship	State	Description
Åhus	Sweden	The schooner was wrecked at "Kjaragaard". She was on a voyage from Hull, Yorkshire, United Kingdom to Malmö.
Benmore	United Kingdom	The steamship was wrecked on the Lagan Reef, off the coast of Borneo. All on board were rescued.
Czarowitz	United Kingdom	The brigantine was hit by the White Star Line ocean liner Britannic (United Kingdom) and sank in the Crosby Channel as she was about to enter the River Mersey. Her captain drowned, five survivors were rescued by Britannic. Czarowitz was bound for Runcorn loaded with china clay from Fowey, Cornwall.
Record	Norway	The schooner was wrecked at "Varlang Jadaren". Her crew were rescued.
Shahjehan	India	The steamship ran aground in the Hooghly River. She was refloated on 4 January.
Snilesworth	United Kingdom	The steamship ran aground on the Owers Shoal, in the English Channel off Selsey Bill, Sussex. She was on a voyage from South Shields, County Durham to Venice, Italy. She was refloated and taken in to Spithead, Hampshire.
Venus	Netherlands	The steamship was driven ashore at Noordwijk, North Holland. She was on a voyage from Danzig, Germany to Amsterdam, North Holland. She was refloated.

== 3 January ==
List of shipwrecks: 3 January 1890
Ship	State	Description
Ataka	United Kingdom	The steamship ran aground on the Smethwick Sands, in Bridlington Bay. She was on a voyage from Calcutta, India to Dundee, Forfarshire. She was refloated and resumed her voyage.
Bouvet	French Navy	The aviso ran ashore on Zanzibar. She was refloated with assistance from HMS Cossack and HMS Turquoise (both Royal Navy) and towed in to Zanzibar in a leaky condition.
Cloncurry	United Kingdom	The steamship collided with the steamship Maple Branch and sank in Suez Bay. Her crew were rescued. Cloncurry was on a voyage from Liverpool, Lancashire to Rangoon, Burma. She was refloated on 23 March.
Excelsior	United Kingdom	The steamship sprang a leak off Brest, Finistère, France and was abandoned by her eighteen crew, who were rescued by two French fishing boats. Excelsior subsequently foundered. She was on a voyage from Bilbao, Spain to Cardiff, Glamorgan.
Friendship	United Kingdom	The steamship was run into by the steamship Tanfield (United Kingdom) and sank in the North Sea off Flamborough Head, Yorkshire. Her six crew were rescued by Tanfield.
Inva	United Kingdom	The yacht ran aground off Cape Trafalgar, Spain. All ten people on board took to a boat, but six of them were drowned when the boat made land. Inva was on a voyage from Gosport, Hampshire to the Mediterranean Sea. She was subsequently towed in to Gibraltar in a leaky condition.
Nordcap	Dominion of Canada	The barque was abandoned in the Atlantic Ocean. Her twelve crew were rescued by the steamship Alfreda (United Kingdom). Nordcap was on a voyage from Saint John, New Brunswick to Penarth, Glamorgan.
Norge	Norway	The passenger ship ran aground in the Kristianiafjord in thick fog. She was on a voyage from Copenhagen, Denmark to Christiania. She was refloated and sent to Gothenburg, Sweden for repairs.

== 4 January ==
List of shipwrecks: 4 January 1890
Ship	State	Description
Celurea	United Kingdom	The barque ran aground on the Barnard Sand, in the North Sea off the coast of Suffolk and was abandoned by her crew. she was on a voyage from Antwerp, Belgium to south shields, County Durham. She was refloated with assistance from the tug Rainbow (United Kingdom) and taken in to Lowestoft, Suffolk.
Florence	United Kingdom	The ship departed from Falmouth, Cornwall for Montrose, Forfarshire. No further trace, reported missing.
Glanrheidol	United Kingdom	The steamship ran aground in the River Orwell. She was on a voyage from Huelva, Spain to Ipswich, Suffolk. She was refloated and taken in to Ipswich.
London	United Kingdom	The Thames barge was run into by the steamship Tom John Taylor (United Kingdom) and sank in the River Thames at the mouth of Deptford Creek.
Queen of the East	United States	The barque was damaged by ice and was beached at Brunshausen, Germany. She was on a voyage from New York to Hamburg, Germany. She was refloated the next day and taken in to Hamburg.
Unnamed	United Kingdom	The schooner foundered off Waterford with the loss of all hands.

== 5 January ==
List of shipwrecks: 5 January 1890
Ship	State	Description
Catalina	Argentina	The barque was driven ashore at Montevideo, Uruguay.
Felix	Sweden	The barque was driven ashore and wrecked at Harboøre, Denmark. She was on a voyage from Cádiz, Spain to Malmöe.
Harefield	United Kingdom	The steamship ran aground in the Thames Estuary off the Mouse Lightship ( Trinity House ).
St. Christopher	Flag unknown	The ship was driven ashore and wrecked near Åhus, Sweden. She was on a voyage from Danzig, Germany to Bordeaux, Gironde, France.

== 6 January ==
List of shipwrecks: 6 January 1890
Ship	State	Description
Bonnie Doon	United Kingdom	The pilot boat broke from her moorings, was driven ashore and wrecked at Barry, Glamorgan.
Brunswick	United Kingdom	The steamship was driven ashore at Lisbon, Portugal. She was on a voyage from Liverpool, Lancashire to Maranhão, Brazil. She was refloated and put back to Lisbon in a leaky condition.
Erin	United Kingdom	The steamship foundered with the loss of all hands.
Linwood	United Kingdom	The brig was driven ashore and wrecked at Dunoon, Argyllshire. She was on a voyage from Moville, County Donegal to Ayr.
Maurice	France	The brig was driven ashore at "Faraman", Bouches-du-Rhône.
Wild Flower	United Kingdom	The steamship ran aground off Southwold, Suffolk. She was refloated and take in to Sunderland, County Durham for repairs.

== 7 January ==
List of shipwrecks: 7 January 1890
Ship	State	Description
Baron Hambro	United Kingdom	The steamship caught fire at Cardiff, Glamorgan with the loss of a life.
Borinqueen	United Kingdom	The steamship caught fire at Liverpool, Lancashire.
Coronilla	United Kingdom	The barque ran aground 7 nautical miles (13 km) west south west of the Newarp Lightship ( Trinity House). Her crew survived. Coronilla was on a voyage from Montevideo, Uruguay to Hamburg, Germany. She was refloated and towed in to Hamburg by a steamship.
Dona Zoyla	Germany	The ship ran aground in the Orinoco River 6 or 7 nautical miles (11 or 13 km) from Ciudad Bolívar, Venezuela. She was on a voyage from Hamburg to Ciudad Bolívar.
Eugenie	Russia	The schooner collided with the steamship Lubeca (Germany) and sank at Gothenburg, Sweden. Her crew were rescued. Eugenie was on a voyage from Grangemouth, Stirlingshire, United Kingdom to Landskrona, Sweden.
George	Netherlands	The barque was abandoned in the Atlantic Ocean. Her thirteen crew were rescued by the barque Emile (Norway). George was on a voyage from Pensacola, Florida, United States to Delfzijl, Groningen.

== 8 January ==
List of shipwrecks: 8 January 1890
Ship	State	Description
Andelana, Ara, and Mediator	Flag unknown Norway; Norway	Andelana was driven from her moorings at Cape Town, Cape Colony and collided with the brig Ara. Both vessels the collided with the barque Mediator. Ara was abandoned by her crew; she was subsequently towed in to Cape Town. Mediator was severely damaged.
Annie Cowley	(United Kingdom of Great Britain and Ireland) Isle of Man	The schooner was wrecked on Inchkeith, Fifeshire. Her three crew were rescued. She was on a voyage from Leith, Lothian to Crail, Fifeshire.
Camerata	United Kingdom	The steamship departed from New York, United States for Cork. No further trace, reported overdue.
Douglas, Deronda, Earl of Dumfries, and Wild Flower	United Kingdom	The steamship Wild Flower caught fire at Sunderland, County Durham, setting fire to three other vessels. Douglas and Earl of Dumfries were destroyed and Deronda was severely damaged with the loss of a crew member. Wild Flower was severely damaged. The fire was extinguished with assistance from the fireboats Fire Barrow and Fire Queen.
Evelyn	United Kingdom	The steamship ran aground at Maassluis, South Holland, Netherlands. She was on a voyage from Benisaf, Algeria to Rotterdam, South Holland. She was refloated.
J. C. Ordway	United States	The sternwheeler was destroyed by fire at San Francisco, California.
Le Locquirec	France	The brig was wrecked off Villez Martin, Loire-Inférieure.
Miaoulee	Romania	The lighter sank at Tulcea.
Otway	United Kingdom	The fishing vessel was wrecked on Inchkeith.
Plover	United Kingdom	The steamship was abandoned in the Atlantic Ocean. Her crew were rescued by the steamship Tancarville (United Kingdom). Plover was on a voyage from Liverpool, Lancashire to St. John's, Newfoundland Colony.
Varuna	Dominion of Canada	The brig was driven ashore at Liverpool, Nova Scotia. She was on a voyage from Liverpool to a Cuban port.

== 9 January ==
List of shipwrecks: 9 January 1890
Ship	State	Description
Caldee	United Kingdom	The steam trawler was driven ashore at Stone Point, Renfrewshire with the loss of two of her crew.
Godiva	United Kingdom	The ship dragged her anchor and ran aground a Philadelphia, Pennsylvania, United States. She was refloated.
Khalif	United Kingdom	The steamship sank at Glasgow, Renfrewshire when a shaft was dropped whilst being loaded and went through her bottom.
Llandaff City	United Kingdom	The steamship collided with the steamship Vivant (United Kingdom) and sank in the River Avon at Pill, Gloucestershire. Llandaff City was on a voyage from Queenstown, County Cork to Bristol, Gloucestershire. She was refloated on 18 January and taken in to Bristol.
Relief	United Kingdom	The tugboat sank at Rotherhithe, Kent.
Rowena	United Kingdom	The steamship was driven ashore 30 nautical miles (56 km) south of Cartagena, Colombia. She was on a voyage from Bluefields, Nicaragua to Boston, Massachusetts.

== 10 January ==
List of shipwrecks: 11 January 1890
Ship	State	Description
Aberdare, and Ardanbhan	United Kingdom	The steamship Aberdare collided with the steamship Ardanbhan (United Kingdom) and sank off the mouth of the River Usk. Her crew survived. Aberdare was on a voyage from a Spanish port to Newport, Monmouthshire. Ardanbhan was severely damaged. She was on a voyage from Newport to Pointe-à-Pitre, Guadeloupe. She put back to Newport.
Charrington	United Kingdom	The steamship ran aground on the Swash, in the Bristol Channel. She was on a voyage from Alexandria, Egypt to Bristol, Gloucestershire. She was refloated and taken in to the King Road.
Italia	Portugal	The steamship ran aground off Ouessant, Finistère, France and sank. Her nineteen crew were rescued. She was on a voyage from Hamburg, Germany to Lisbon.
James Taylor	United Kingdom	The schooner was driven ashore at "Haddocks". She was on a voyage from London to Londonderry.
Jane Law	United Kingdom	The barque foundered at sea. There were at least six survivors. They were rescued by the steamship Australien (France). Jane Law was on a voyage from New York, United States to Hull, Yorhsire.
Minnie	United Kingdom	The schooner was driven ashore and wrecked at Kimmeridge, Dorset. Her crew survived. She was on a voyage from the Isles of Scilly to Middlesbrough, Yorkshire.
Parthenia	United Kingdom	The ship departed from Laguna for the English Channel. No further trace, reported overdue.
Primrose	United Kingdom	The steamship ran aground at Villa Real, Argentina. She was on a voyage from Buenos Aires, Argentina to Nantes, Loire-Inférieure, France. She was refloated the next day.
Teal	United Kingdom	The steamship was driven ashore at Ardrossan, Ayrshire. She was on a voyage from Belfast, County Antrim to Ardrossan.
Sverre	Norway	The barque was driven ashore at Arisaig, Inverness-shire.
Whinlatter	United Kingdom	The barque was driven ashore at Newhaven, Sussex. She was on a voyage from London to San Diego, California, United States.

== 11 January ==
List of shipwrecks: 11 January 1890
Ship	State	Description
Aberdare	United Kingdom	The steamship (wrongly initially identified by some as "Labarrouere"), arriving with iron ore at Newport, Monmouthshire, Wales, collided with the steamship Ardanbhan (United Kingdom) and sank in the mouth of the Usk Lighthouse. No lives were lost and Aberdare was raised on 13 January.
Aghios Nicholaos	Greece	The brig was wrecked at "San Serghi".
Arakan	France	The barque departed from Mayotte for Belle Île, Morbihan. No further trace, reported missing.
Francois	Netherlands East Indies	The ship capsized at Sourabaya and was a total loss.
Joseph Banigan	Brazil	The schooner ran aground off the coast of Pará. She was on a voyage from a port in Pará to Liverpool, Lancashire, United Kingdom.
Louise	Netherlands	The schooner was abandoned at sea. Her crew were rescued by the full-rigged ship Struan (Norway).
Marlborough	United Kingdom	The full-rigged ship departed from Lyttleton, New Zealand for London. No further trace, reported missing.
Mary	United Kingdom	The schooner collided with a steamship off the Isle of Wight and was cut in two with the loss of all but one of her crew. The survivor was rescued by the steamship City of Amsterdam (United Kingdom). Mary was on a voyage from Pentone, Italy to Brussels, West Flanders, Belgium.
Mertola	United Kingdom	The barque was abandoned in the Atlantic Ocean. Her nine crew were rescued by the barque Frenchny (United Kingdom). Mertola was on a voyage from Fernandina Beach, Florida, United States to a port in the English Channel.
Olinda	Portugal	The steamship caught fire at Bremen, Germany.

== 12 January ==
List of shipwrecks: 12 January 1890
Ship	State	Description
Ardbanhan, and La Barrouère	United Kingdom; France	The steamships collided at the mouth of the River Usk. La Barronère sank. Her crew survived. Ardbanhan was beached.
City of Worcester	United States	The steamship struck a sunken rock and sank off New London. All on board, more than 60 people, were rescued.
Mary Hoyle	United Kingdom	The schooner collided with the steamship Manhatta (United Kingdom) and sank with the loss of all but one of her crew. The survivor was rescued by the steamship City of Amsterdam (United Kingdom).
Thames	United Kingdom	The steamship was damaged by fire at Govan, Renfrewshire.

== 13 January ==
List of shipwrecks: 13 January 1890
Ship	State	Description
Ann	United Kingdom	The schooner foundered in the Irish Sea 15 nautical miles (28 km) south of the Isle of Man. Her three crew were rescued by the fishing trawler Stag (United Kingdom).
Ben Hur	United States	The schooner was wrecked on Blanche Point, Nova Scotia. Crew saved.
Heather Bell	United Kingdom	The yacht capsized in Conway Bay with the loss of the sole person aboard.
Maid of Honour	United Kingdom	The ship ran aground off Ryde, Isle of Wight. She was refloated and taken in to Cowes, Isle of Wight in a leaky condition.

== 14 January ==
List of shipwrecks: 14 January 1890
Ship	State	Description
Albina	United Kingdom	The schooner was driven ashore at Saltfleet, Lincolnshire. She was refloated and taken in to Grimsby, Lincolnshire.
Camiola	United Kingdom	The steamship was severely damaged at North Shields, Northumberland when the barque Jupiter capsized onto her.
Equity	United Kingdom	The steamship was beached at Leule, Germany. She was refloated and resumed her voyage.
Hamilton	(United Kingdom of Great Britain and Ireland) Isle of Man	The fishing boat was abandoned off Ramsey. Her crew were rescued by the Ramsey Lifeboat Two Sisters (Royal National Lifeboat Institution).
Jupiter	United Kingdom	The barque capsized at North Shields. She was righted the next day.
Otter	(United Kingdom of Great Britain and Ireland) Isle of Man	The fishing boat was abandoned off Ramsey. Her crew were rescued by the Ramsey Lifeboat Two Sisters (Royal National Lifeboat Institution). Otter subsequently foundered.
Sacrobosco	United Kingdom	The steamship burned to the waterline at Baltimore, Maryland. Several lives were lost. The wreck was bought by thrRed Star Line. It was salvaged, rebuilt and returned to service as Conemaugh.
Sagitta	(United Kingdom of Great Britain and Ireland) Guernsey	The ship, a barque or barquentine, collided with the steamship County of Salop (United Kingdom) and sank in the English Channel 10 nautical miles (19 km) south west of Beachy Head, Sussex. Her nine crew took to the boats; they were rescued by County of Salop. Sagitta was on a voyage from London to Guernsey.
Surprise	United Kingdom	The fishing trawler was driven ashore 2 nautical miles (3.7 km) north of Ramsey. Her four crew were rescued by rocket apparatus.
W. M. J.	United Kingdom	The fishing trawler was abandoned off Ramsey. Her four crew were rescued by the Ramsey Lifeboat Two Sisters (Royal National Lifeboat Institution).
Unnamed	United Kingdom	The fishing boat foundered off the coast of County Donegal with the loss of all nine hands.

== 15 January ==
List of shipwrecks: 15 January 1890
Ship	State	Description
Eiffel Tower	United Kingdom	The steamship ran aground in the Nieuwe Waterweg. She was on a voyage from Odessa, Russia to Rotterdam, South Holland, Netherlands. She was refloated with assistance.
Reaper	United Kingdom	The schooner was driven ashore at Rattray Head, Aberdeenshire. Her crew were rescued by rocket apparatus. She was on a voyage from Sunderland, County Durham to Inverness.
St. Kevin	United Kingdom	The steamship was driven ashore at Dundalk, County Louth.
Thalia	United Kingdom	The steamship ran aground at Reval, Russia. Her crew survived. She was on a voyage from Savannah, Georgia, United States to Reval.

== 16 January ==
List of shipwrecks: 16 January 1890
Ship	State	Description
Friends	United Kingdom	The fishing lugger capsized and sank off Howth Head, County Dublin. Her seven crew were rescued by the lugger St. Patrick (United Kingdom).
Puritan	United Kingdom	The full-rigged ship was driven ashore at Greenock, Renfrewshire. She was refloated the next day.

== 17 January ==
List of shipwrecks: 17 January 1890
Ship	State	Description
Arbutus	United Kingdom	The steamship struck the Goldstone Rock, off Lindisfarne, Northumberland and sank. All sixteen people on board survived. She was on a voyage from Dundee, Forfarshire to Seaham, County Durham.
Hampshire	United Kingdom	The steamship caught fire at Genoa, Italy. She was on a voyage from Savannah, Georgia, United States to Genoa.
Latona	United Kingdom	The barque foundered 13 nautical miles (24 km) south of the Tuskar Rock. Her crew took to the boats; they were rescued by the steam trawler Heron (United Kingdom). Latona was on a voyage from Cardiff, Glamorgan to the Cape of Good Hope, Cape Colony.
Maude	United Kingdom	The yacht was driven ashore at Palermo, Sicily, Italy.
Nerid	United Kingdom	The ship departed from Blyth, Northumberland for Gothenburg, Sweden. No further trace, reported overdue.

== 18 January ==
List of shipwrecks: 18 January 1890
Ship	State	Description
Bellarena	United Kingdom	The steamship was driven ashore at Faro Point, Sicily, Italy. She was on a voyage from Glasgow, Renfrewshire to Venice, Italy. She was refloated the next day.
Cintra	United Kingdom	The ship was driven ashore at Wexford. She was refloated.
Crono	Austria-Hungary	The barque collided with a steamship and sank in the North Sea. All seven people on board were rescued. She was on a voyage from South Shields, County Durham, United Kingdom to Fiume.
Divinia	United Kingdom	The steamship was driven ashore on Skagen, Denmark. She was on a voyage from Leith, Lothian to Eckkernförde, Germany.
Enno	United Kingdom	The schooner ran aground on the Cork Sand, in the North Sea off the coast of Essex. She was on a voyage from Dunkerque, Nord, France to Ipswich, Suffolk. She was refloated and beached at Harwich, Essex.
Following	United Kingdom	The ship was driven ashore at Wexford.
Gleaner	United States	The schooner was wrecked on Murder Island near Yarmouth, Nova Scotia. Later pulled off and taken to Yarmouth, heavily damaged. Crew saved after spending two days in a hut on the island.
Glynn	United Kingdom	The schooner was driven ashore at Wexford.
Lege	United Kingdom	The dredger was driven ashore at Ardrossan, Ayrshire. Both crew were rescued by rocket apparatus.
J. C. Wade	United Kingdom	The schooner was driven ashore at Wexford. She was refloated with assistance on 22 January.
Jenny Lind	United Kingdom	The schooner was driven ashore at Wexford.
Libertador	Colombia	The steamship sank in the Magdalena River downstream of Puerto Berrío.
Norsa	United Kingdom)	The steamship ran aground on the Akorale Reef, 2 nautical miles (3.7 km) off the coast of Ceylon and was wrecked. Her crew were rescued. She was on her maiden voyage, from Middlesbrough, Yorkshire to Madras, India.
Petrel	United Kingdom	The schooner was driven ashore at Wexford.
Phillis	United Kingdom	The schooner was driven ashore at Lamlash, Isle of Arran. She was on a voyage from Irvine, Ayrshire to Kilkeel, County Down.
Royal Dane	United Kingdom	The tug sank at Leith, Lothian.
Venice	United Kingdom	The steamship caught fire at Barcelona, Spain. The fire was extinguished.
William Porter	United Kingdom	The ketch was driven ashore at Kingsgate, Kent. She was on a voyage from Dunkerque, Nord, France to London.
Williams	United Kingdom	The schooner was driven ashore at Wexford.
Unnamed	United Kingdom	The fishing boat sank in the English Channel off Folkestone, Kent. Her crew were rescued.

== 19 January ==
List of shipwrecks: 19 January 1890
Ship	State	Description
Agnes	United Kingdom	The smack was driven ashore and severely damaged at Cobh, County Cork.
Enterprise	United Kingdom	The steamship was driven ashore and damaged at Burtonport, County Donegal. She was refloated on 7 February and towed in to Rutland Island, County Donegal.
Hirondelle	United Kingdom	The steam yacht was driven ashore at Toward Point, Argyllshire. She was on a voyage from Greenock, Renfrewshire to Buenos Aires, Argentina. She was refloated in early February and taken in to Greenock.
John Rapp	United States	The schooner sprang a leak and foundered. Her crew were rescued by the brig Ohio (United States). John Rapp was on a voyage from Norfolk, Virginia to Philadelphia, Pennsylvania.
Katie Robbins	United States	The steamboat collided with a barge and sank near Vicksburg, Mississippi with the loss of four lives.
HMS Malabar, and Eurymanthe	Royal Navy; France	The Euphrates-class troopship HMS Malabar collided with the steamship Eurymanthe off Cape Trafalgar, Spain. Both vessels were damaged. The put in to Cádiz, Spain.
Norde	United Kingdom	The ship collided with the steamship Tara (United Kingdom) at Greenock, Renfrewshire and was damaged.
Ophelia	United Kingdom	The ship caught fire at Chittagong, India. The fire was extinguished on 3 February.
Penthesilea	United Kingdom	The full-rigged ship was driven ashore near Appledore, Devon. Her 31 crew were rescued by the Braunton Lifeboat Robert and Catherine ( Royal National Lifeboat Institution). Penthesilea was on a voyage from Newport, Monmouthshire to Mauritius. She was refloated on 18 February.
Appledore Lifeboat	Royal National Lifeboat Institution	The lifeboat was driven ashore at Appledore. Her crew were rescued.

== 20 January ==
List of shipwrecks: 20 January 1890
Ship	State	Description
Aramis	France	The brig foundered in the English Channel off Boulogne, Pas-de-Calais. She was on a voyage from Le Havre, Seine-Inférieure to Guadeloupe.
Balmore	United Kingdom	The barque ran aground off Mocha Island, Chile and was abandoned by her crew. She was on a voyage from Buenos Aires, Argentina to Talcahuano, Chile. She subsequently became a wreck.
Cape Clear	United Kingdom	The steamship departed from Liverpool, Lancashire for Rosario, Argentina. Presumed subsequently foundered in the Bristol Channel with the loss of all hands. Wreckage from the ship was discovered 4 nautical miles (7.4 km) south of Hartland Point, Devon on 4 February.
Carl Albert	Sweden	The schooner was driven ashore and wrecked at Thisted, Denmark. She was on a voyage from Newcastle upon Tyne, Northumberland, United Kingdom to Helsingborg.
Centennial	Victoria	The steamship sank in the Patterson River.
Commodore	United Kingdom	The steamship ran aground in the River Thames at Greenwich, London. She was on a voyage from Newcastle upon Tyne to London.
Fanny	Norway	The barque ran aground near the "Grisebo Lighthouse".
Glenrose	United Kingdom	The ship was driven ashore at Port MacDonnell, South Australia. She subsequently became a wreck.
Hesper	United Kingdom	The steamship departed from Barry, Glamorgan for Genoa, Italy. No further trace, reported missing.
Poonah	United Kingdom	The steamship ran aground at Tripoli, Libya. She was refloated.
Strauss	Germany	The steamship ran aground at Bremerhaven. She was on a voyage from London to Bremen. She was refloated and completed her voyage.

== 21 January ==
List of shipwrecks: 21 January 1890
Ship	State	Description
Aberfeldy	United Kingdom	The ship was run into by the steamship Daventry (United Kingdom) off Barry, Glamorgan and was beached.
Ballister	Spain	The schooner ran aground at the mouth of the Rio Grande do Sul, Brazil. She was on a voyage from Cádiz to the Rio Grande do Sul. She was refloated and found to be leaky.
Battle Isle	United Kingdom	The steamship was driven ashore on Gigha, Argyllshire.
Heedful	United Kingdom	The ship was driven ashore and wrecked at "Badcoll". She was on a voyage from the River Tyne to Stornoway, Isle of Lewis.
Plantina	United States	The ship ran aground at Santander, Spain. She was on a voyage from Philadelphia, Pennsylvania to Santander.

== 22 January ==
List of shipwrecks: 22 January 1890
Ship	State	Description
Dispatch	United States	Whilst towing a barge, steamboat dragged her anchor during a storm and was wrecked on the east shore of Seymour Canal on the coast of Admiralty Island in the Alexander Archipelago in Southeast Alaska, 15 nautical miles (28 km; 17 mi) northwest of the mouth of the canal. Her crew of three survived.
Dora Ewing	United Kingdom	The steamship collided with the steamship Britannia (United Kingdom) at Hull, Yorkshire and was damaged.
Genoa, and Pregel	Germany; Denmark	The steamships collided at Hamburg and were both damaged.
Giang Ann	United Kingdom	The steamship was driven ashore in the Thousand Islands, Netherlands East Indies. She was refloated on 25 January and taken in to Singapore.
Gulf of Aden	United Kingdom	The steamship caught fire at Liverpool, Lancashire. The fire was extinguished.
Henry Brand, and Lord Derby	United Kingdom	The steamships collided off Cardiff, Glamorgan and both vessels sank. Henry Brand was refloated on 24 January. Lord Derby was on a voyage from Bensisaf, Algeria to Cardiff. She was refloated on 23 January.
Lake Huron	United Kingdom	The steamship struck the quayside at Liverpool and was damaged. She was on a voyage from New York, United States to Liverpool.
Nan	United Kingdom	The barge sank at Custom House, Newham, London.
Olive	Germany	The barque ran aground in the Elbe at Schulau. She was on a voyage from Howland Island to Hamburg. She was refloated on 23 January and taken in to Hamburg.
Portland	United Kingdom	The lighter was driven ashore at Kimmeridge, Dorset.
Salvatore	Italy	The brig was wrecked at "Torre de Sale". She was on a voyage from Marsala, Sicily to Livorno.
San Antonio	United Kingdom	The barque ran aground at Wilmington, North Carolina, United States. She was on a voyage from Barbadoes to Wilmington.
Walter Scott	United Kingdom	The steamship ran aground at Blyth, Northumberland. She was refloated.
Unnamed	(United Kingdom of Great Britain and Ireland) Gibraltar	The hulk was run into by the steamship Tarifa (Spain) at Gibraltar and damaged.

== 23 January ==
List of shipwrecks: 23 January 1890
Ship	State	Description
Ambassador	United Kingdom	The barque was run into by the full-rigged ship Cambrian Duchess (United Kingdom) off The Mumbles, Glamorgan. She was taken in to Cardiff, where she was declared a constructive total loss.
Isabel	United States	The sternwheeler sank in the Willamette River near San Francisco, California.
John M'Leod	United Kingdom	The ship was driven ashore at Yokohama, Empire of Japan. She was on a voyage from Yokohama to Iloilo, Spanish East Indies.
Manhattan	United Kingdom	The steamship ran aground nar Haulbowline, County Cork. She was on a voyage from London to New York, United States. She was refloated with the assistance of a tug.
St. Michael	United Kingdom	The lugger was driven ashore and wrecked at Skerries, County Dublin.
Strathblane	United Kingdom	The steamship was driven ashore and wrecked 7 nautical miles (13 km) west of Cape Recife, Cape Colony. She was on a voyage from London to the Natal Colony.
Unnamed	Flag unknown	The steamship foundered in the Atlantic Ocean (33°44′N 51°00′W), witnessed by the steamship Brampton (United Kingdom).

== 24 January ==
List of shipwrecks: 24 January 1890
Ship	State	Description
Amazon	United States	The barge, under the tow of the steamship Harold (United States) lost her tow line in high wind and heavy seas causing her to fill and sink in Long Island Sound. Her captain drowned.
Amstelstroom	Netherlands	The steamship ran aground in the River Thames at Blackwall, London, United Kingdom.
Carl and Louise	United Kingdom	The brigantine was wrecked on the Gullane Rocks, off the coast of Lothian. Her seven crew were rescued. She was on a voyage from Aruba Curaçao and Dependencies to Leith, Lothian.
Carpanan	United Kingdom	The barque was driven ashore near Lingan, Nova Scotia, Dominion of Canada. She was on a voyage from Sydney, Nova Scotia to St. John's, Newfoundland Colony.
Clutha	United Kingdom	The ship ran aground at Burry Port, Carmarthenshire. She was refloated.
Eliezer	Norway	The schooner was abandoned in the Atlantic Ocean. Her crew were rescued by the steamship Glendochart (United Kingdom). She was sighted on 27 January by the steamship Duchess of Cornwall (United Kingdom).
Kandy	United Kingdom	The schooner was wrecked at Tarbert, Argyllshire. Her crew were rescued by a smack. She was on a voyage from Irvine, Ayrshire to Campbeltown, Argyllshire.
Lusie Eiland	Belgium	The fishing smack collided with the barque Thorgny (Sweden) and sank. Her crew were rescued.
Swift	United Kingdom	The brig was damaged by fire at Gravesend, Kent.
True Briton	United Kingdom	The steamship collided with the steamship Hochfeld (Germany) at Bilbao, Spain and sank.
Val de Saire	France	The ship was driven ashore on the Île de Ré, Charente-Inférieure. She was on a voyage from Glasgow, Renfrewshire to Rio de Janeiro, Brazil.
Unnamed	Argentina	The lighter sank at Buenos Aires.
900 unnamed vessels	China	The fishing boats were wrecked on the coast of Bashu with heavy loss of life.
11 unnamed vessels	Japan	The fishing boats were loss off Tobishima with the loss of50 lives.

== 25 January ==
List of shipwrecks: 25 January 1890
Ship	State	Description
Express	United Kingdom	The steamship ran aground at Stromness, Orkney Islands. She was refloated.
G. C. Kelly	United Kingdom	The schooner ran aground on the Soldier's Ledges, off Pease Island, Nova Scotia, Dominion of Canada. She floated off and consequently sank with the loss of three of the eight people on board. Survivors were rescued the next day by the schooner Louise (United Kingdom).
Irex	United Kingdom	The full-rigged ship was driven ashore and wrecked in Scratchel Bay, Isle of Wight with the loss of eight of the 32 people on board. Survivors were rescued by rocket apparatus. She was on a voyage from Glasgow, Renfrewshire to Rio de Janeiro, Brazil. She broke in two on 1 November.
Islay	United Kingdom	The steamship collided with the steamship Strathspey (United Kingdom) in the Clyde upstream of Dumbarton. Islay was beached at "Kelvinwater".
Jehu	United Kingdom	The schooner was driven ashore on Inchkeith, Fifeshire. Her crew were rescued the next day by a tug. She was on a voyage from Grangemouth, Stirlingshire to Saint-Servan, Ille-et-Vilaine, France.
Nile	United Kingdom	The ketch was driven ashore and wrecked at Rattray Head, Aberdeenshire. Her four crew survived. She was on a voyage from Invergordon, Ross-shire to Hartlepool, County Durham.
Rondo	United Kingdom	The ship ran aground in Oban Bay. She was on a voyage from Portland, Maine, United States to Greenock, Renfrewshire. She was refloated and towed in to Greenock in a severely leaky condition.
Sarah Mills	United Kingdom	The lighter was wrecked off Montrose, Forfarshire with the loss of all four crew. She was being towed from Bo'ness, Lothian to Aberdeen by the tug Fairweather (United Kingdom).
Thorne	United Kingdom	The barque was abandoned off Douglas, Isle of Man. All eighteen people on board reached shore in one of the ship's lifeboats. She was on a voyage from Liverpool, Lancashire to Adelaide, South Australia. Thorne was subsequently driven into the rocks off Onchan Head, Isle of Man and wrecked.
Unnamed	United Kingdom	The schooner was driven onto the Dulas Rocks, off the coast of Anglesey. She was refloated.
Unnamed	United Kingdom	The Fifie was wrecked at Nairn. Her four crew survived.
Unnamed	Japan	A number of fishing boats were lost off "Maschawa" with the loss of 23 lives.

== 26 January ==
List of shipwrecks: 26 January 1890
Ship	State	Description
Ashlowe	Dominion of Canada	The barque ran aground off The Mumbles, Glamorgan and was abandoned by her eleven crew. They were rescued by the Mumbles Lifeboat Wolverhampton ( Royal National Lifeboat Institution ). Ashlowe was on a voyage from Cork, United Kingdom to an St. John's, Newfoundland Colony. She was refloated on 22 March and taken in to Swansea, Glamorgan.
Athlete	United Kingdom	The schooner was abandoned in the North Sea. Her crew were rescued by the smack Fanny (United Kingdom). Athlete was on a voyage from Leith, Lothian to Woolwich, London.
Cambrian Duchess	United Kingdom	The full-rigged ship collided with the quayside at Cardiff and was severely damaged.
Emma	Germany	The steamship departed from Burntisland, Fife, United Kingdom for Tönning. No further trace, reported missing.
Harmonie	Norway	The barque was driven ashore on Coll, Inner Hebrides, United Kingdom with the loss of a crew member. She was on a voyage from Liverpool, Lancashire, United Kingdom to a Norwegian port.
Loch Moidart	United Kingdom	The ship was driven ashore at Callantsoog, North Holland, Netherlands while approaching the port of Hamburg, Germany. Only two of her 32 crew survived. She was on a voyage from Iquique, Peru and Pisagua, Chile to Hamburg, Germany.
Nedjed	Flag unknown	The steamship ran aground in the Small Bitter Lake.
Pythomene	United Kingdom	The barque caught fire at Brooklyn, New York. She was on a voyage from Calcutta, India to Brooklyn. She was scuttled to extinguish the fire. She was refloated on 30 January.
Rohilla	United Kingdom	The ship was wrecked on the American Bol, 35 nautical miles (65 km) off Texel, North Holland, Netherlands with the loss of all 30 people on board. She was on a voyage from Pisagua, Chile to Hamburg.
St. Clair	United Kingdom	The schooner was abandoned in the North Sea 80 nautical miles (150 km) off St. Abbs Head, Berwickshire. Her crew were rescued by the steamship Elbe (Germany). St. Clair was on a voyage from Aberdeen to Newcastle upon Tyne, Northumberland.
300 unnamed vessels	Japan	The fishing boats were lost off Kadusa and Toukomma with the loss of about 600 lives.

== 27 January ==
List of shipwrecks: 27 January 1890
Ship	State	Description
Alma	United Kingdom	The ship was driven ashore at Stornoway, Isle of Lewis.
Glenesk	United Kingdom	The barque ran aground in the Clyde. She was on a voyage from Glasgow, Renfrewshire to Buenos Aires, Argentina. She was refloated.
Howard A. Turner	Dominion of Canada	A derelict barque was seen being towed by the steamship Corrwg (United Kingdom) off Sennen Cove, Cornwall, United Kingdom with no signs of crew on board. At around 20:00 the barque came ashore on rocks at Penzer Point, near Lamorna Cove, Cornwall. She was on a voyage from Saint John, New Brunswick to Dublin, United Kingdom and was believed to have been abandoned ten days before, and the crew landed at Liverpool, Lancashire.
Prince Llewellyn, and Sigmar	United Kingdom; Norway	The barque Sigmar collided with the steamship Prince Llewellyn off Martin García Island, Argentina and sank. Sigmar was on a voyage from Cardiff, Glamorgan, United Kingdom to Buenos Aires. Prince Llewellyn was on a voyage from Paraná, Brazil to Buenos Aires. She was severely damaged and was beached. She was refloated and taken in to La Boca, Argentina for repairs.
Reliance	Victoria	The barge struck the Burtonairy Rocks and sank in the Darling River.
Unnamed	United Kingdom	The wherry sank at South Shields, County Durham.

== 28 January ==
List of shipwrecks: 28 January 1890
Ship	State	Description
Cambodge	France	The steamship was driven ashore in the River Thames. She was on a voyage from Marseille, Bouches-du-Rhône to London, United Kingdom. She was refloated on 2 February with the assistance of seven tugs and taken in to London the next day.
DeSoto	United States	The steamship burned to the waterline 1 nautical mile (1.9 km) downstream of Owensboro, Kentucky. Two crewmen died.
Harmonie	Norway	The barque collided with another vessel in the English Channel and was severely damaged. She was on a voyage from Fredrikstad to Cape Town, Cape Colony. She was towed in to Portland, Dorset, United Kingdom by the steamship Gervase (United Kingdom).
Irene Morris	United Kingdom	The steamship collided with the steamship Busy Bee (United Kingdom) at Antwerp, Belgium and was beached. Irene Morris was on a voyage from Sicily, Italy to Antwerp.
Lisbon	Flag unknown	The steamship was driven ashore at Hampton, North Carolina, United States.
Mysore	United Kingdom	The ship departed from Liverpool, Lancashire for Iquique Peru. No further trace, presumed foundered with the loss of all 29 hands.
Ohio	United States	The steamship sank at Louisville, Kentucky. All on board were rescued. She was on a voyage from Memphis, Tennessee to Cincinnati, Ohio.
Riverina	United Kingdom	The steamship was driven ashore at Ram Head, Victoria. Her crew were rescued by the steamship Wendourie (United Kingdom). Riverina was on a voyage from London to Sydney, New South Wales. She was a total loss.

== 29 January ==
List of shipwrecks: 29 January 1890
Ship	State	Description
Earnholme	United Kingdom	The steamship struck the pier and ran aground at Buckie, Banffshire and was severely damaged. She was refloated and found to be severely leaky. Following temporary repairs, she departed for Aberdeen on 2 February.
Gellert	Germany	The steamship collided with an iceberg in the Atlantic Ocean and was holed. She was on a voyage from Hamburg to New York, United States. She completed her voyage.
Silvio	Italy	The barque departed from Holyhead, Anglesey, United Kingdom for Callao, Peru. No further trace, reported missing.

== 30 January ==
List of shipwrecks: 30 January 1890
Ship	State	Description
Hugo	Germany	The ship was driven ashore near Telok Betong, Netherlands East Indies. She was a total loss.

== 31 January ==
List of shipwrecks: 31 January 1890
Ship	State	Description
Acorn	(United Kingdom of Great Britain and Ireland) Guernsey	The brig ran aground at Saint Sampson. She was on a voyage from Newcastle upon Tyne, Northumberland to Saint Sampson. She was refloated and taken in to Saint Sampson in a leaky condition.
Amethyst	United Kingdom	The steamship was driven ashore at Dielette, Manche, France and was severely damaged. She was later refloated and sailed for the Clyde.
Falcon	United Kingdom	The steamship ran aground off Hospital Point, Victoria, Virgin Islands.
Lucari	Argentina	The steamship ran aground on the Negrillos Reef. She was refloated and found to be severely leaky. Subsequently placed under repair.

== Unknown date ==
List of shipwrecks: Unknown date in January 1890
Ship	State	Description
Adjai	India	The ship was driven ashore in the Sundarbans.
Adorna	Flag unknown	The ship ran aground at Maassluis, South Holland, Netherlands. She was refloated on 19 January.
Alexandria	United Kingdom	The barque was driven ashore and wrecked on Crete, Greece. Her crew were rescued.
Alice May	United Kingdom	The ship was abandoned at sea. Her crew were rescued. She was on a voyage from the West Indies to Bo'ness, Lothian.
Alice M. Strople	United States	The schooner was believed to have sunk in a gale, described as a hurricane, on 9 January. Lost with all 14 crew.
Arno	United Kingdom	The schooner was driven ashore at Redcar, Yorkshire. She was on a voyage from Ipswich, Suffolk to Middlesbrough, Yorkshire. She was refloated on 4 January and taken in to Middlesbrough.
Brunswick	United Kingdom	The steamship was driven ashore at Lisbon, Portugal. She was refloated.
Ceylon	Norway	The steamship ran aground at Finkenwerder, Germany. She was on a voyage from Nicolaieff, Russia to Hamburg, Germany. She was refloated on 5 January.
Clan Alpine	United Kingdom	The steamship ran aground at Cape Frio, Brazil and was severely damaged. She was refloated and resumed her voyage.
Coventina	United Kingdom	The steamship was driven ashore at Mauritius. She was refloated.
Dreadnaught	United States	The fishing schooner left Saint Pierre Island on 16 January and vanished, probably lost in a gale and snowstorm that night. Lost with all seven crew and one passenger.
Elektra	Trieste	The steamship was driven ashore at Suakim, Mahdist State. She was on a voyage from Hong Kong to Trieste. She was refloated.
Elser	Flag unknown	The ship foundered with the loss of all hands. She was on a voyage from Ostend, West Flanders, Belgium to Cardiff, Glamorgan, United Kingdom.
Emily L. Boyd, and Rolf	United Kingdom; Norway	The barque Emily L. Boyd collided with the full-rigged ship Rolf and sank in the Atlantic Ocean. Rolf was severely damaged. She put in to Saint Thomas, Virgin Islands.
Enno	United Kingdom	The schooner ran aground on the Cork Sand, in the North Sea off the coast of Essex. She was on a voyage from Dunkerque, Nord, France to Ipswich, Suffolk. She was refloated and taken in to Harwich, Essex in a leaky condition.
Fabio	Italy	The ship was abandoned at sea. Six people were rescued by Enterprise (United States Navy). Fabio was on a voyage from Rouen, Seine-Inférieure, France to Cardiff.
Gleniffer	United Kingdom	The steamship was driven ashore at Savannah, Georgia, United States. She was refloated and taken in to Savannah.
Guiana	Netherlands	The ship was driven ashore at Mossoró, Brazil. She was on a voyage from Pernambuco to Mossoró.
Hamarona	United Kingdom	The steamship was lost in the Niger River.
Heather Bell	United Kingdom	The yacht sank off Conway, Caernarfonshire with the loss of a life.
Hermelin	Sweden	The barque was lost whilst on a voyage from Pascagoula, Mississippi, United States to Port Natal, Cape Colony. Her crew were rescued by the steamship Principia (United Kingdom).
Howard	United Kingdom	The ship was wrecked at Havana, Cuba. She was on a voyage from Mobile, Alabama, United States to Liverpool.
Iberia	Argentina	The steamship was wrecked in a cyclone at Concordia with the loss of her captain.
Inex	Argentina	The tug sank in the River Plate.
Iroquois	United States	The steamship ran aground at Charleston, South Carolina and sprang a leak. She was on a voyage from Charleston to New York. She was refloated and put back to Charleston.
Isaac A. Chapman	United States	The schooner left Saint Pierre and Miquelon on 16 January and vanished. Probably sank in a snowstorm and gale that night. Lost with all seven crew and one passenger.
James Turpie	United Kingdom	The steamship ran aground in the Patapsco River, Maryland, United States. She was later refloated.
Jamie Carleton	United States	The schooner collided with the steamship Ardangorm (United Kingdom) and sank in the Atlantic Ocean.
Josephine	Norway	The ship was abandoned in the Atlantic Ocean before 31 January with the loss of six of her fourteen crew. Survivors were rescued by the steamship Thanemore (United Kingdom). Josephine was on a voyage from New York to Danzig, Germany.
Leander	United Kingdom	The schooner was wrecked at Barbadoes.
Lee	United Kingdom	The steam lighter was driven ashore and wrecked at Saddell, Argyllshire.
Macapa	United Kingdom	The steamship sank in the Purus River, Brazil before 17 January. She was a total loss.
Maren	United Kingdom	The brigantine was driven ashore at Moville, County Donegal. She was on a voyage from Londonderry to Bristol, Gloucestershire. She was refloated with assistance on 22 January.
Mathilde	France	The brigantine was abandoned at sea. Her crew were rescued by the steamship Polynesian (United Kingdom). Mathilde was on a voyage from Martinique to Saint Pierre. She was discovered in a derelict condition on 1 February by the steamship Naranja (United Kingdom) and set afire.
Maude Scammell	Flag unknown	The ship was wrecked at "South Penedo", Brazil. her crew were rescued. She was on a voyage from Montevideo, Uruguay to Barbadoes.
Millie G. Brown	United States	The schooner was abandoned at sea. Her crew were rescued. She was on a voyage from Norfolk, Virginia to Montevideo.
Norseman	United Kingdom	The schooner was wrecked off Mogador, Morocco. Her crew were rescued.
Nueva Providenza	Italy	The barque was wrecked in the Cayman Islands. Her crew were rescued. She was on a voyage from a port in Jamaica to Pensacola, Florida, United States.
Parramatta	Norway	The ship was damaged by fire at New Orleans, Louisiana, United States.
Pellegro	Italy	The barque sprang a leak 95 nautical miles (176 km) off Cape Clear Island, County Cork, United Kingdom. She was on a voyage from Cardiff to Genoa. She was beached at Ventry, County Kerry, United Kingdom. Her crew were rescued by the Coast Guard.
Prince Alfred	United Kingdom	The brig collided with the steamship Pennland (Belgium) off Dungeness, Kent and sank. Her crew were rescued by Pennland. Prince Alfred was on a voyage from Guernsey, Channel Islands to London.
Riviera	Norway	The barque was driven ashore in the Paraná River before 26 January. She was refloated and towed to Buenos Aires, Argentina.
Rosetta	United Kingdom	The steamship ran aground on Saltholm, Denmark. She was on a voyage from Hull, Yorkshire to Reval, Russia. She was refloated on 11 January and resumed her voyage.
Sir Robert Peel	Norway	The brig was abandoned at sea. Her crew were rescued. She was subsequently towed in to Barcelona, Spain by the steamship St. Pierre (France).
Southwold	United Kingdom	The steamship ran aground in the Nieuwe Waterweg.
Spaniel	United Kingdom	The steamship was lost off Borneo. All on board were rescued.
Speranza	Italy	The brig was wrecked at "Faramaz" with the loss of all hands.
Sunshine	United Kingdom	The steamship collided with the steamship Wellfield (United Kingdom) and sank in the Gulf of Lyons. Sunshine was on a voyage from the River Tyne to Genoa, Italy.
Tanjore	United Kingdom	The barque was driven ashore at Little River, Maine, United States. She was refloated with assistance and placed under repair.
Tantallon	United Kingdom	The steamship was driven ashore at Mauritius. She was refloated.
Themis	Denmark	The barque was driven ashore at Lemvig. She was on a voyage from Cardiff, Glamorgan, United Kingdom to Malmö, Sweden.
Transition	United Kingdom	The steamship ran aground on the Mocha Shoal. She was on a voyage from Cardiff to Saigon, French Indo-China. She had been refloated by 7 January and resumed her voyage.
Tunbridge	United Kingdom	The steamship foundered in the Bay of Biscay. Her 25 crew were rescued by the steamship Alassio (United Kingdom).Tunbridge was on her maiden voyage, from Blyth, Northumberland to Alexandria, Egypt.
Veendam	Netherlands	The steamship was driven ashore at Mauritius. She was refloated.
Villy	Flag unknown	The barque was driven ashore at Jury's Gap, Sussex. She was on a voyage from Le Havre, Seine-Inférieure, France to Hamburg. She was refloated with assistance on 8 January and resumed her voyage.
Voluna	Norway	The ship was presumed to have foundered with the loss of all hands. She was on a voyage from Christiania to Newcastle upon Tyne. Wreckaged from the ship washed up at Frederikshavn, Denmark on 24 January.
Volunteer	United Kingdom	The schooner was driven ashore at Conway, Caernarfonshire. She was refloated.
About 1,200 unnamed fishing vessels	China; Japan	Between 24 and 26 January, more than 3,000 fishermen were believed to have drowned during a hurricane off the Chinese and Japanese coasts.
