= List of ships lost on their maiden voyage =

This is a list of ships that were lost on their maiden voyage.

== Naval ships ==
- Vasa (1628)
- Galera Victoria (1729)
- Constante (1730)
- Georgiana (1863)
- Flach (1866)
- Grosser Kurfürst (1878)
- Doterel (1881)
- Cerisoles (1918)
- Inkerman (1918)
- Posidonia (1940) (Note: Due to enemy action)
- Bismarck (1941)
- Dinsdale (1942)
- Shinano (1944)

== Passenger ships and cargo liners ==
- Amazon (1851)
- City of Philadelphia (1854)
- New Era (1854)
- Tayleur (1854)
- Willem III (1871)
- Geltwood (1875)
- Castilian (1899)
- Titanic (1912)
- Great Bear (1916)
- City of Honolulu (1922)
- Georges Philippar (1932)
- Magdalena (1949)
- Hans Hedtoft (1959)
- Zenobia (1980)

== Cargo ships ==
- Batavia (1629)
- Vansittart (1719) (Note: Maiden revenue-earning voyage)
- Fortuyn (1723)
- Zeewijk (1727)
- Amsterdam (1749)
- Royal Captain (1773)
- Hartwell (1787)
- George Green (1830)
- Carrier Pigeon (1852)
- Schomberg (1855)
- Crescent City (1871)
- Catherine Griffiths (1875)
- George Roper (1883)
- Queensmore (1889)
- Irex (1890)
- Brecknockshire (1916)
- Dumaru (1918)
- Mecanicien Donzel (1918)
- Hastier (1919)
- Treveal (1920)
- Adolf Vinnen (1923)
- Île de Los (1935)
- Joseph Medill (1935)
- Mim (1939)
- Empire Frost (1941)
- Empire Thunder (1941)
- Michael E (1941)
- Alexander Macomb (1942)
- Derryheen (1942)
- Empire Clough (1942)
- Empire Drum (1942)
- Empire Dryden (1942)
- Empire Spenser (1942)
- Fort Good Hope (1942)
- Fort la Reine (1942)
- George Calvert (1942)
- George Thatcher (1942)
- Sam Houston (1942)
- San Victorio (1942)
- Stangarth (1942)
- Stephen Hopkins (1942)
- Bloody Marsh (1943)
- Empire Florizel (1943)
- Fort Cedar Lake (1943)
- Haakon Jarl (1943)
- John Morgan (1943)
- J. Pinckney Henderson (1943)
- Kherzon (1943)
- Matt W. Ransom (1943) (Note: Constructive total loss)
- Molly Pitcher (1943)
- Fort Crevier (1944)
- John A. Treutlen (1944)
- Union Star (1981)
- Ranga (1982)
- Reijin (1988)

== Racing yachts ==
- Mohawk (1876)
