= Adolf Vinnen =

A number of ships have been named Adolf Vinnen, including:

- Adolf Vinnen (barque), a four-masted barque built in 1892 as Somali. In service under this name 1912–14 then interned in Mexico. Sold and renamed in 1921.
- Adolf Vinnen (barquentine), a five-masted barquentine built by Krupps in 1921-22, that was wrecked on her maiden voyage
- German weather ship Adolf Vinnen, a German weather ship sunk by the British destroyer Somali in 1940
- MV Adolf Vinnen, a West German cargo ship built in 1962
