= List of shipwrecks in December 1888 =

The list of shipwrecks in December 1888 includes ships sunk, foundered, grounded, or otherwise lost during December 1888.

== 1 December ==
List of shipwrecks: 1 December 1888
Ship	State	Description
Concha Ballester	Spain	The brig was abandoned in the Atlantic Ocean east of Bermuda. Her sixteen crew were rescued by the barque Somand (Norway). Concha Ballester was on a voyage from Brunswick, Georgia, United States to Málaga.
Lady Stuart	United Kingdom	The schooner was wrecked at Safi, Morocco. Her crew were rescued.
Plover	United Kingdom	The steamship foundered in the English Channel south of Plymouth, Devon, according to a message in a bottle that washed ashore near Devonport Dockyard.
Vasco da Gama	Norway	The barque was run into by the steamship Boulmer (United Kingdom) in the North Sea and was severely damaged. She was towed into the River Tyne the next day and beached.

== 2 December ==
List of shipwrecks: 2 December 1888
Ship	State	Description
Afton	United Kingdom	The steamship sprang a leak and was beached at Milford Haven, Pembrokeshire. She was on a voyage from Dublin to the Bristol Channel.
Baines Hawkins	United Kingdom	The steamship ran aground at Pound Point. She was on a voyage from Le Tréport, Seine-Inférieure, France to Bristol, Gloucestershire. She was run into by the steamship South Tyne (United Kingdom) and was severely damaged.
Lord Provost	United Kingdom	The steamship was driven ashore south of Eyemouth, Berwickshire. Her crew survived. She was on a voyage from Peterhead, Aberdeenshire to South Shields, County Durham.

== 3 December ==
List of shipwrecks: 3 December 1888
Ship	State	Description
Seaton	United Kingdom	The steamship collided with Argo (United Kingdom) and sank off Hull, Yorkshire with the loss of two of her crew.
Unnamed	Flag unknown	The brig ran aground on the Elbow Bank, in the Solent.

== 4 December ==
List of shipwrecks: 4 December 1888
Ship	State	Description
Dolphin	United Kingdom	The steam trawler was driven onto the Skerry Rocks and sank. Her crew were rescued.
Vendome	United Kingdom	The steamship was wrecked 4 nautical miles (7.4 km) west of Strumble Head, Pembrokeshire. Her crew survived. She was on a voyage from the Isle of Man to Neath, Glamorgan.

== 5 December ==
List of shipwrecks: 5 December 1888
Ship	State	Description
Clan Macintosh	United Kingdom	The steamship ran aground in the Suez Canal. She was on a voyage from Colombo, Ceylon to a British port.
Gothia	Germany	The ship ran aground Hveen, Sweden. She was refloated with the assistance of another ship and taken in to Copenhagen, Denmark.

== 6 December ==
List of shipwrecks: 6 December 1888
Ship	State	Description
Hartlepools	United Kingdom	The steamship struck a rock and was wrecked at "Naarlevig", south of Egersund, Norway with the loss of seventeen of her 21 crew. She was on a voyage from the Danube to Bergen, Norway.

== 7 December ==
List of shipwrecks: 7 December 1888
Ship	State	Description
John Bryce	United Kingdom	The ship was lost in a hurricane in the South Atlantic with the loss of a crew member.
Pioneer	United Kingdom	The brig was run into by the barque Crusader (United States) and sank in the English Channel 6 nautical miles (11 km) off Dungeness, Kent. Her nine crew were rescued by Crusader. Pioneer was on a voyage from Newcastle upon Tyne, Northumberland to a Mediterranean port.

== 8 December ==
List of shipwrecks: 8 December 1888
Ship	State	Description
Hawk, and Recepta	United Kingdom	The steamship Hawk and the collier Recepta collided in the River Thames at Barking, Essex. Both vessels were severely damaged. Hawk was on a voyage from London to Hamburg, Germany. She was beached at Plumstead Marshes, Kent and her passengers were taken off. Recepta was severely damaged at the bow. A stowaway on board was killed. She completed her voyage to London.

== 9 December ==
List of shipwrecks: 9 December 1888
Ship	State	Description
F. J. Robson	United Kingdom	The steamship put in to A Coruña, Spain on fire. She was on a voyage from Methil, Fife to Odesa, Russia.
Yaquina Bay	United States	Yaquina Bay The passenger ship broke her tow and ran aground in Yaquina Bay at Newport, Oregon. All on board were rescued. She was declared a total loss.

== 10 December ==
List of shipwrecks: 10 December 1888
Ship	State	Description
Bellingham	United Kingdom	The steamship was damaged by an onboard explosion off Grimsby, Lincolnshire. Two of her crew were injured. She was on a voyage from Hull, Yorkshire to Savona, Italy.
Dewdrop	United Kingdom	The fishing vessel was driven ashore and wrecked near the Grebe. Her crew were rescued.
Martha	United Kingdom	The schooner ran aground on the Perch Bank. She was on a voyage from Caernarfon to Sunderland, County Durham.
Violet	Norway	The schooner was driven ashore at Boulmer, Northumberland, United Kingdom. She was on a voyage from Teignmouth, Devon to Leith, Lothian, United Kingdom. She subsequently became a wreck.
Volante	United Kingdom	The steam yacht foundered off Bardsey Island, Pembrokeshire. Her crew were rescued.

== 11 December ==
List of shipwrecks: 11 December 1888
Ship	State	Description
Cledona	United Kingdom	The ship was driven ashore at Whiting Bay, Isle of Arran. She was on a voyage from Troon, Ayrshire to Limerick.
Elba	United Kingdom	The ship ran aground 3 1/2 nautical miles (6.5 km) south west of North Sunderland, Berwickshire. She was refloated on 14 December with the assistance of four tugs and taken in to Sunderland, County Durham in a leaky condition.
Nicolina	Italy	The barque, on a voyage from Greenock, Scotland, to Buenos Aires with coal, and seeking shelter off Kingstown, County Dublin in as gale, ran aground on Burford Bank in Dublin Bay. When her crew abandoned ship, the pilot and helmsman remained and she floated off but then went ashore on Clontarf Strand. She was refloated and towed in to Dublin Port.
Strathspey	United Kingdom	The steamship was driven ashore at Irvine, Ayrshire. She was on a voyage from Londonderry to Irvine.
Unnamed	Flag unknown	The schooner sank on the Hale Sand, in the North Sea off the coast of Lincolnshire, United Kingdom.

== 16 December ==
List of shipwrecks: 16 December 1888
Ship	State	Description
Betty	Russia	The barque was driven ashore and wrecked at Folkestone, Kent, United Kingdom. She was on a voyage from Stettin, Germany to New York, United States.
Lumberman's Laddie	United Kingdom	The barque ran aground and was wrecked on the Haisborough Sands, in the North Sea off the coast of Norfolk. Her crew took to the boats; they were rescued by the steamship Ann Webster (United Kingdom). Lumberman's Laddie was on a voyage from Leith, Lothian to Rio de Janeiro, Brazil.
Unnamed	Flag unknown	The steamship was driven ashore at Dungeness, Kent. She was refloated.
Unnamed	Flag unknown	The steamship was driven ashore at Dungeness.
Unnamed	Flag unknown	The steamship was driven ashore at Lydd, Kent.

== 17 December ==
List of shipwrecks: 17 December 1888
Ship	State	Description
Asia	United Kingdom	The steamship collided with the steamship Africa (United Kingdom in the River Thames and was beached near Gravesend, Kent .
Atalanta	Russia	The barque ran aground in the North Sea with the loss of several lives.
Neptune	Norway	The barque was abandoned in the North Sea off the Dutch coast. Her crew were rescued by a British fishing smack. She was on a voyage from Stockholm, Sweden to Antwerp, Belgium.
W. H. Green	Norway	The schooner collided with the steamship Dowlais (United Kingdom) and sank. Her crew were rescued by Dowlais. W. H. Green was on a voyage from Hamburg, Germany to Santa Catharina.

== 18 December ==
List of shipwrecks: 18 December 1888
Ship	State	Description
Wild Rose	United Kingdom	The steamship ran ashore 4 nautical miles (7.4 km) south of Bridlington, Yorkshire. She was refloated and assisted in to Bridlington.

== 19 December ==
List of shipwrecks: 19 December 1888
Ship	State	Description
China	United Kingdom	The steamship ran aground in the River Thames at Northfleet, Kent. She was refloated.
Gamma	United Kingdom	The steamship ran aground on the Middle Sand, in the Humber and was severely damaged. She was on a voyage from Hull, Yorkshire to Odesa, Russia.
Unnamed	Flag unknown	The steamship was driven ashore and wrecked at Detachment Gribe, Cornwall, United Kingdom.

== 20 December ==
List of shipwrecks: 20 December 1888
Ship	State	Description
Hay and Catherine	United Kingdom	The ship was driven ashore at Arbroath, Forfarshire. Her crew were rescued by the Arbroath Lifeboat. She was on a voyage from Sunderland, County Durham to Arbroath.

== 21 December ==
List of shipwrecks: 21 December 1888
Ship	State	Description
Amalfi	Germany	The steamship ran aground in the Elbe at Schulau. She was on a voyage from New York, United States to Hamburg.
B. S. Mimbelli	Malta	The barque was driven ashore at Gibraltar.
Hankow	United Kingdom	The steamship ran aground in the Suez Canal. She was on a voyage from London to Sydney, New South Wales.. She was refloated and resumed her voyage.

== 22 December ==
List of shipwrecks: 22 December 1888
Ship	State	Description
Mendocino	United States	The auxiliary schooner bottomed out crossing the Bar at Humboldt Bay and went ashore on the south side. On the 25/26 she refloated at high tide crossing the channel and grounding on the north side becoming a total loss. Her engineer, his wife, and infant daughter drowned when a lifeboat overturned, or just the daughter.
Racer	United Kingdom	The smack was driven ashore and wrecked at Skerries, County Dublin.
Storm Queen	United Kingdom	The steamship foundered in the Bay of Biscay (45°20′N 9°20′W) with the loss of six of her 28 crew. Survivors were rescued by the barque Gulnare (Norway). Storm Queen was on a voyage from Sebastopol, Russia to Rotterdam, South Holland, Netherlands.

== 23 December ==
List of shipwrecks: 23 December 1888
Ship	State	Description
Benan	United Kingdom	The full-rigged ship was wrecked at Point Cloates, Western Australia. Her crew survived. She was on a voyage from Cardiff, Glamorgan to Hong Kong.
Harmony	Netherlands	The fishing smack collided with the barque J. C. Julius (United Kingdom) and sank in the Dogger Bank. Her crew were rescued by J. C. Julius.
Kate Adams	United States	The steamship was destroyed by fire in the Mississippi River opposite Commerce, Mississippi with the loss of 33 lives.
Saltburn	United Kingdom	The steamship was driven ashore at Coatham, Yorkshire. She was on a voyage from the Barns Ness Lighthouse to Middlesbrough, Yorkshire.

== 24 December ==
List of shipwrecks: 24 December 1888
Ship	State	Description
Gulf of Guyaquil	United Kingdom	The steamship departed from the River Mersey on her maiden voyage. She was bound for São Vicente, Cape Verde Islands. No further trace, presumed foundered with the loss of all 41 people on board.
John H. Hannah	United States	The steamship was destroyed by fire in the Mississippi River off Plaquemine, Louisiana with the loss of 21 lives.
Mary Anning	United Kingdom	The steamship was holed by the anchor of the steamship Galatz (United Kingdom) and sank at Cardiff Docks while loading coal.
Mary Davies	United Kingdom	The schooner was driven ashore at Seaford, Sussex. Her three crew were rescued. She was on a voyage from Portland, Dorset to London.

== 25 December ==
List of shipwrecks: 25 December 1888
Ship	State	Description
Alaska, and Thomas Joliffe	United Kingdom	The steamship Alaska and the tug Thomas Joliffe became jammed together in a channel at Penarth, Glamorgan and were both severely damaged Alaska subsequently heeled against Thomas Joliffe, sinking her. Alaska was taken in to Penarth and Thomas Joliffe was refloated.
Gulf of Guayaquil	United Kingdom	The steamship foundered between the South Bishop Lighthouse, Pembrokeshire and the Tuskar Rock. She was on a voyage from Liverpool, Lancashire to a port on the west coast of South America.

== 26 December ==
List of shipwrecks: 26 December 1888
Ship	State	Description
Suakim	United Kingdom	The ship departed from Newcastle, New South Wales for San Francisco, California, United States. No further trace, reported missing.

== 27 December ==
List of shipwrecks: 27 December 1888
Ship	State	Description
Ada	United Kingdom	The ship was wrecked at Abbotsbury, Dorset with the loss of all hands. She was on a voyage from Exeter, Devon to Harwich, Essex.
Stephen D. Horton	Canada	The full-rigged ship caught fire in the Atlantic Ocean 400 nautical miles (740 km) off Pernambuco, Brazil and was abandoned with the loss of two of her crew. Survivors took to the boats; they were rescued on 30 December by the barque Twilight (United Kingdom). Stephen D. Horton was on a voyage from Calcutta, India to New York, United States.

== 29 December ==
List of shipwrecks: 29 December 1888
Ship	State	Description
Glance	United Kingdom	The schooner was wrecked at Mazagan, Morocco. Her crew were rescued.

== 30 December ==
List of shipwrecks: 30 December 1888
Ship	State	Description
Bristol	United States	The steamship was destroyed by fire at Newport Dock, New York.
Maude	United Kingdom	The ship was sighted off Dungeness, Kent whilst on a voyage from South Shields, County Durham to Buenos Aires, Argentina. No further trace, reported overdue.
Macgregor	United Kingdom	The steamship was lost in Ascension Bay, Mexico. Her crew were rescued.
Reliance	United Kingdom	The tug foundered off Prawle Point, Devon.

== 31 December ==
List of shipwrecks: 31 December 1888
Ship	State	Description
Cameo	United Kingdom	The steamship was driven ashore and severely damaged near Drobak, Norway. She was on a voyage from Christiania, Norway to London.
Egypt	United Kingdom	The steamship caught fire in the Atlantic Ocean. She was on a voyage from New York to a British port. The fire was extinguished.
H. C. Warmoth	United States	The steamship was sunk in a collision with the steamship Sarah (United States) in the Pearl River. A passenger was killed.
Jane Owen	United Kingdom	The schooner foundered off the Smalls Lighthouse, Cornwall. Her crew were rescued by the steamship Avon (United Kingdom). Jane Owen was pn a voyage from Plymouth, Devon to Aberdovey, Merionethshire.
Rare Plant	United Kingdom	The schooner was driven ashore in Mountbatten Bay. She was refloated.

== Unknown date ==
List of shipwrecks: Unknown date in December 1888
Ship	State	Description
Ada-Gane	United Kingdom	The ketch foundered in the English Channel off Portland, Dorset with the loss of all four crew.
Agamemnon	United Kingdom	The ship was driven ashore in Mihara Bay. She was refloated and towed in to Hiogo, Japan.
Alf	United Kingdom	The barque was lost with all fourteen hands. She was on a voyage from Demerara, British Guiana to Philadelphia, Pennsylvania, United States.
Alundra	United Kingdom	The steamship was driven ashore at San Cataldo, Sicily, Italy. She was later refloated and taken in to Brindisi, Italy.
Amana, and Belgravia	United Kingdom	The steamships collided in the Suez Canal and were both severely damaged. Amana was on a voyage from Penarth, Glamorgan to Bombay, India. Belgravia was on a voyage from Calcutta India to New York, United States. She put in to Port Said, Egypt for temporary repairs.
Anapira	United Kingdom	The schooner was run into by the steamship Lutetia (United Kingdom) off Lowestoft, Suffolk and was severely damaged. Anapira was on a voyage from Hamburg, Germany to London. She was assisted in to Lowestoft by a tug and sank there.
Anna	Sweden	The schooner was driven ashore and wrecked at "Hesseloen". Her crew were rescued by the salvage ship Helsingør (Denmark). Anna was on a voyage from Varberg to "Veile".
Anna	Flag unknown	The ship was driven ashore at Hallands Väderö, Sweden. She was on a voyage from Lisbon, Portugal to Riga, Russia. She was later reflaoted and taken in to Copenhagen, Denmark.
Anne	United Kingdom	The brig was wrecked in the Îles de Glénan, Finistère, France. She was on a voyage from Arcachon, Gironde, France to Swansea, Glamorgan.
Astracana	United Kingdom	The full-rigged ship collided with the steamship Borussia (Germany) and was abandoned 14 nautical miles (26 km) off Cherbourg, Manche, France. Her crew were rescued by Borussia. Astracana was on a voyage from Philadelphia, Pennsylvania to Havre de Grâce, Seine-Inférieure, France.
August	Germany	The steamship was holed by the propeller of the steamship Rydal Fell (United Kingdom) and sank at Bristol, Gloucestershire, United Kingdom.
Avon	United Kingdom	The steamship struck a sunken rock in the River Severn and was beached. She was on a voyage from Sudbrook, Monmouthshire to Bristol.
Benalder	United Kingdom	The steamship ran aground in the Elbe. She was on a voyage from Hamburg to Greenock, Renfrewshire. She was refloated and put back to Hamburg in a leaky condition.
Benmore	United Kingdom	The steamship was driven ashore at "Bilosara", Russia. She was later refloated and taken in to Kertch, Russia in a leaky condition.
Bermudez	Venezuela	The steamship sank after collision with steamer Nutrias, also Venezuelan, in the River Orinoco 15 nautical miles (28 km) below Ciudad Bolivar.
Bradley	United Kingdom	The steamship collided with another vessel and sank in the River Thames at Northfleet, Kent. She was refloated on 21 December and towed in the Higham, Kent.
Brooklands	United Kingdom	The ship was driven ashore at "St. Georges".
Bruno and Marie	Germany	The barque was abandoned in the Bay of Biscay. Her crew were rescued by the barque Augusta (Sweden). Bruno was on a voyage from Havre de Grâce to Buenos Aires, Argentina.
Cameo	United States	The ship was driven ashore in Vineyard Bay. She was on a voyage from Jamaica to New London.
Cameo	United Kingdom	The steamship ran aground and sank in the Christianiafjord. She was on a voyage form Christiania, Norway to London.
Carl Friedrich	Germany	The ship was driven ashore and wrecked on Skagen, Denmark. She was on a voyage from St. David's to Colberg.
Cashie Doo	United Kingdom	The yacht was driven ashore at Saigon, French Indo-China. She was on a voyage from Pulo Ubi to Saigon.
Castine	Flag unknown	The ship was driven ashore on Bermuda. She was refloated.
Chamois	Flag unknown	The ship ran aground at Odesa, Russia. She was refloated with assistance.
Countess of Lancaster	United Kingdom	The ship ran aground at Hayle, Cornwall.
Crest	United Kingdom	The steamship was driven ashore at "Ostre Hage", Denmark. She was refloated with assistance and taken in to Copenhagen, Denmark.
Easington	United Kingdom	The steamship was driven ashore and wrecked in the Sea of Marmara 20 nautical miles (37 km) from the entrance to the Bosphorus. Her crew were rescued by rocket apparatus.
Eidern	Sweden	The barque collided with the steamship Vorwarts (United Kingdom). Eidern was on a voyage from Sweden to Valencia, Spain. She was towed into the Weser in a waterlogged condition by Vorwarts.
Eldorado	Flag unknown	The ship was driven ashore at Duclair, Seine-Inférieure, France.
Eleois	United States	The ship was beached on Crooked Island, Bahamas. She was on a voyage from Africa to New York.
Ella	Sweden	The barque was driven ashore at Beadnell, Northumberland, United Kingdom.
Elsa	Germany	The steamship was driven ashore at Falsterbo, Sweden. She was on a voyage from Colberg to Hartlepool, County Durham, United Kingdom. She was refloated with assistance from the steamship Laura (Denmark) and taken in to Copenhagen.
Erato	Norway	The steamship was driven ashore at "Karlavigen", near Tønsberg.
Escalona	Flag unknown	The ship put in to Saint John's, Newfoundland Colony on fire. She was on a voyage from New Orleans, Louisiana, United States to Bremen, Germany.
Esther	Norway	The barque was run into by the steamship Express (United Kingdom) at Cardiff, Glamorgan and was severely damaged. She was taken in to Cardiff for repairs.
Ethel Horatio	United Kingdom	The steamship was driven ashore at Lemvig, Denmark. She was on a voyage from Sunderland, County Durham to Wismar, Germany.
Ethel Horatio	United States	The ship was abandoned at sea. She was on a voyage from Laguna to New York.
Etta	United Kingdom	The barque was driven ashore in Creadon Bay, County Waterford with the loss of her captain from the eighteen people on board. She was on a voyage from Saint John's, Newfoundland Colony to Fleetwood, Lancashire. She was refloated on 31 December and taken in to Woodstown Beach.
Fabian	United Kingdom	The steamship was driven ashore on Makronisos, Greece. She was later refloated and taken in to Smyrna, Ottoman Empire.
Franceschino	Cyprus	The ship was wrecked at Kyrenia.
Franz von Mathies	Germany	The brig collided with the barque St. Olaf (Russia) and was abandoned in the Skaggerak. Her crew were rescued by St. Olaf. Franz von Mathies was on a voyage from Hartlepool to Halmstadt, Sweden.
Frey	Norway	The steamship ran aground and sprang a leak at St. Davids, Pembrokeshire, United Kingdom.
Garry	United Kingdom	The steamship was driven ashore on Anholt, Denmark.
George Lamb	United Kingdom	The schooner was driven ashore at Saint Pierre and Miquelon.
Giorgio Washington	Italy	The barque was driven ashore on Scharhörn, Germany. Her crew were rescued. She was on a voyage from Buenos Aires to Hamburg, Germany.
Glencoe	United Kingdom	The steamship ran aground at Danzig, Germany. She was later refloated and towed in to Danzig.
Golden Grove, and Walley	United Kingdom	The steamships collided at Constantinople, Ottoman Empire. Both vessels were severely damaged and were beached.
Gothia	Germany	The steamship was driven ashore at Falsterbo. She was on a voyage from Hamburg to New York. She was refloated with the assistance of a steamship and taken in to Copenhagen.
Governor	United Kingdom	The barque was driven ashore at Key West, Florida, United States. She was on a voyage from Navassa Island to Plymouth, Devon. She was refloated and found to be severely leaky.
Govina	United Kingdom	The steamship collided with another vessel and sank in the River Thames at Gravesend, Kent. She was later refloated and taken in to Tilbury, Essex.
Graf Bismarck	United Kingdom	The steamship ran aground in the Scheldt at Vinkenisse, Zeeland, Netherlands. She was refloated and taken in to Antwerp, Belgium.
Gustave et Victor	France	The pilot boat was run down and sunk 10 nautical miles (19 km) off Les Casquets, Channel Islands by the barque Agon (Norway with the loss of two lives.
Hamlet	Denmark	The schooner was driven ashore. She was on a voyage from Havre de Grâce to Kallundborg. She was refloated with the assistance of a steamship and towed in to Fredrikshavn.
Henry Wesley	United Kingdom	The smack foundered in the North Sea with the loss of all hands.
Hermann Heinrich	Germany	The ship was driven ashore and wrecked at "Tromoen", Norway. She was on a voyage from Flensburg to Kragerø, Norway.
Heroine	United Kingdom	The ship was wrecked at Dunbar, Lothian. Her crew were rescued.
James Mason	United Kingdom	The brig was severely damaged by fire at Wilmington, Delaware.
Japanese	United Kingdom	The steamship ran aground at "Donaslaw", Ottoman Empire. She was on a voyage from Odesa to Gibraltar.
Jasper	United Kingdom	The steamship foundered off the coast of Wigtownshire with the loss of all eleven crew. She was on a voyage from Workington, Cumberland to Glasgow, Renfrewshire.
John Ward	United Kingdom	The ketch capsized in a squall and foundered in the North Sea off Whitby, Yorkshire with the loss of all hands. She was on a voyage from South Shields, County Durham to Sheerness, Kent.
Joseph and Thomas	United Kingdom	The ketch was driven ashore and wrecked at Bude, Cornwall. Her crew were rescued by the Bude Lifeboat.
Kamroon	India	The flat ran aground on the Sunderbund, in the Hooghly River and broke in two.
Kate	(United Kingdom of Great Britain and Ireland) Guernsey	The brig ran aground on the Shingles, in the Solent. She was on a voyage from Newcastle upon Tyne, Northumberland to Jersey, Channel Islands. She was refloated and taken in to Cowes, Isle of Wight in a leaky condition.
Knight Templar	United Kingdom	The ship foundered off the coast of Finistère.
Kronprinds Carl	Norway	The ship was driven ashore. She was on a voyage from Newcastle upon Tyne to Kristiansand. She was refloated and put in to Mandal, Norway, in a leaky condition.
Lily of Devon	United Kingdom	The ship foundered at sea. Her crew were rescued on 13 December by Bluebird (United Kingdom).
Magda	United Kingdom	The ship was driven ashore and severely damaged at Negroponte, Greece. She was later refloated.
Margaret Ann	United Kingdom	The ship was driven ashore and wrecked on Puffin Island, Anglesey.
Mexico	United States	The steamship was damaged by fire at New York.
Miranda	Sweden	The steamship was driven ashore at Nasby, Öland. She was later refloated with the assistance of a steamship but consequently sank with the loss of one life.
Munk	Germany	The ship struck a sunken wreck and sprang a severe leak. She was on a voyage from Stettin to Plymouth. She put in to Lyngør, Norway.
Myrthe	France	The barque was wrecked at Casablanca, Morocco. Her crew were rescued by Marbella (Spain).
Nerissa	Germany	The steamship ran aground on the Haven Hole Spit, in the Thames Estuary. She was on a voyage from Hamburg to London.
Nino Bixio	Italy	The barque collided with the barque Ran (Norway) at Buenos Aires and was severely damaged.
Olaf Nielssen	Norway	The brigantine was abandoned in the North Sea with the loss of one of her six crew. Survivors were rescued by the steamship Norge (Norway).
Onalaska	United States	The brig was driven ashore at Cape May, New Jersey. She was refloated with assistance and taken in to Philadelphia for repairs.
O. R. Bishop	Germany	The barque caught fire. She was on a voyage from San Francisco, California, United States to Queenstown, County Cork, United Kingdom. She put back to San Francisco.
Orient	United Kingdom	The ship ran aground at Nyborg, Denmark.
Ozama	Italy	The ship was wrecked at Saint Domingo. Her crew were rescued. She was on a voyage from Genoa to Saint Domingo.
Pomona	United Kingdom	The ship ran aground on the Goodwin Sands, Kent. She was on a voyage from South Shields to Rosario, Brazil. She was refloated and taken in to Dover, Kent for repairs, being leaky.
Punctum	United Kingdom	The brigantine was driven ashore near Skegness, Lincolnshire.
Pytheas	France	The ship was wrecked at Cette, Hérault. She was on a voyage from Spain to Cette.
Richard	Norway	The brig was driven ashore at Fredrikshavn, Denmark. She was on a voyage from Karlskrona, Sweden to Aalborg, Denmark.
River Derwent	United Kingdom	The steamship ran aground on the Caloot Bank, in the North Sea off the coast of Zeeland. She was on a voyage from London to Terneuzen, Zeeland. She was refloated and resumed her voyage.
Salama	Russia	The barque was driven ashore at Thisted, Denmark. She was on a voyage from Kristianstad, Sweden to Valencia.
Santos	Germany	The steamship ran aground in the Elbe at Lühesand. She was refloated.
Scalpa	United Kingdom	The steam yacht was driven ashore at Scarborough, Yorkshire. Her crew were rescued by the Scarborough Lifeboat. She was on a voyage from Sunderland to Colchester, Essex.
Sea Bird	United States	The ship collided with a schooner and was abandoned. Her crew were rescued. She was on a voyage from Port-de-Paix, Haiti to New York. She was subsequently towed in to New York.
Serethe	United Kingdom	The ship was abandoned at sea. Her crew were rescued by Budapest (Flag unknown). Serethe was on a voyage from London to Saint John's, Newfoundland Colony.
Snaefell	(United Kingdom of Great Britain and Ireland) Isle of Man	The paddle steamer collided with the steamship Maranhense (Flag unknown) and was severely damaged. She was taken in to Liverpool, Lancashire.
Sophie	Norway	The schooner was driven ashore at Lista. She was on a voyage from Leith, Lothian to Odense, Denmark.
St. Kilda	United Kingdom	The ship was driven ashore at Newry, County Antrim. She was on a voyage from Garston, Lancashire to Warrenpoint, County Down.
Svelvig	Norway	The barque was abandoned at sea. Her crew were rescued. She was on a voyage from Ayr, United Kingdom to Christiania.
Tagus	United Kingdom	The brig was taken in to Stonehaven, Aberdeenshire in a derelict condition.
Tempo	United Kingdom	The ship caught fire at Port Elizabeth, Cape Colony after 17 December.
Texada	France	The brigantine was driven ashore and wrecked at Saint Pierre and Miquelon.
Thalia	United Kingdom	The ship was destroyed by fire at sea. She was on a voyage from Hull, Yorkshire to Pisagua, Chile.
Thor	Denmark	The barque was driven ashore. She was on a voyage from Hartlepool to Horsens. She was refloated with assistance.
Trevose	United Kingdom	The ship was driven ashore near Rouen, Seine-Inférieure.
Uganda	Denmark	The steamship foundered at sea. Her crew were rescued by the fishing smack Bonnie Bell (United Kingdom). Uganda was on a voyage from Charlestown, Cornwall to Kolding.
Venice	Flag unknown	The ship was driven onto reefs off Bermuda and was severely damaged.
Victoria	United Kingdom	The steamship struck a sunken wreck near "Lamyit", Japan and was damaged. She was taken in to Nagasaki, Japan.
Voyageur	United Kingdom	The ship was driven ashore near Barfleur, Manche, France. She was on a voyage from Swansea to Trouville-sur-Mer, Calvados, France.
Wastdale	United Kingdom	The steamship was driven ashore at Lemvig. Her crew were rescued. She was on a voyage from Middlesbrough, Yorkshire to Liepāja, Russia.
William K. Chapman	Canada	The barque collided with the steamship Bedlormie (United Kingdom) and sank off the North Foreland, Kent. William K. Chapman was on a voyage from Hamburg to New York.
Woodlawn	Natal Colony	The schooner was wrecked on the coast of Madagascar.
No. 13	India	The flat was destroyed by fire at Chitpore.
Unnamed	Flag unknown	A steamship was driven ashore at Dagerort, Russia.
Unnamed	Flag unknown	A steamship sank in Port Yarrock Bay, County Kerry, United Kingdom.
