= SS Hastier =

Hastier was the name of two ships operated by Lloyd Royal Belge.

- SS Hastier (1885), a passenger ship which caught fire in 1920 and was scrapped in 1922.
- SS Hastier (1919), a cargo ship which foundered in 1919 on her maiden voyage.
