= RMS Magdalena (1948) =

British Passenger & reefer cargo liner

- RMS Magdalena

History

United Kingdom
- Name: Magdalena
- Namesake: Magdalena River in Colombia
- Owner: Royal Mail Lines
- Port of registry: London
- Route: England – South America
- Ordered: 1946
- Builder: Harland and Wolff, Belfast
- Launched: 11 May 1948
- Completed: 18 February 1949
- Maiden voyage: 9 March 1949
- Out of service: 25 April 1949
- Identification: United Kingdom official number: 182955; Call sign GFQD
- Fate: Ran aground 24 April 1949; later sunk

General characteristics
- Type: Passenger & refrigerated cargo liner
- Tonnage: 17,547 gross register tons (GRT); 9,886 net register tons (NRT); 9,725 tons deadweight (DWT)
- Length: 570 ft 1 in (173.76 m) o/a; 540 ft 0 in (164.59 m) p/p
- Beam: 73 ft 3 in (22.33 m)
- Draught: 28 ft 9 in (8.76 m) (SLL)
- Installed power: 18,000 shp (13,000 kW)
- Propulsion: 2 × steam turbines, double reduction geared to drive twin screws
- Speed: 18 knots (33 km/h)
- Capacity: 529 passengers; 460,000 cubic feet (13,000 m^{3}) refrigerated cargo space
- Crew: 251

Position where Magdalena was wrecked off Brazil.

RMS Magdalena was a 17,547 GRT passenger and refrigerated cargo ocean liner that Harland and Wolff built in Belfast in 1948 for Royal Mail Lines (RML). Launched on 11 May 1948, she was the third-largest ship being built in a UK shipyard at that time.

Built as a replacement for a ship lost during the Second World War, she was to serve on route between England and the east coast of South America. She was wrecked on her maiden voyage in 1949, the sixth ship built by Harland and Wolff to suffer this fate. The insurance payout of £2,295,000 was the largest made at the time for a marine casualty in the United Kingdom. Due to changing trading conditions RML decided not to build a replacement vessel.

== Description ==
Magdalena was 570 feet 1 inch (173.76 m) long overall (540 feet 0 inches (164.59 m) between perpendiculars, with a beam of 73 feet 3 inches (22.33 m), and a draught of 28 feet 9 inches (8.76 m) (SLL). She was powered by two Parsons steam turbines, double reduction geared, driving twin screw propellers. Developing 18,000 shaft horsepower (13,000 kW), they could propel the ship at 18 knots (33 km/h).

Magdalena had five holds for the carriage of refrigerated cargo, three forward and two aft, for a total of 460,000 cubic feet (13,000 m^{3}). Internally she was divided into nine watertight compartments. She was of part-riveted and part-welded construction, with a double bottom. She was certificated to carry 251 crew and 529 passengers. She was assessed at 17,547 GRT, 9,885 NRT, 9,725 DWT.

== History ==
RML ordered Magdalena in 1946. Her keel had been laid by 8 October when Harland and Wolff applied for a passenger certificate for the ship. In 1947 it was reported that delivery would be delayed until the end of 1948 and that the cost of building her would be considerably higher than the estimated cost when the order was placed. She was built to replace Highland Patriot, which had been sunk in 1940. Magdalena was the first passenger ship built by Harland and Wolff in Belfast after the end of the war and the third-largest being built in the United Kingdom at that time.

The ship was the third in the Royal Mail Lines fleet to carry the name Magdalena, she was built to serve on the Tilbury – Cherbourg – Vigo – Lisbon – Las Palmas – Pernambuco – Bahia – Rio de Janeiro – Santos – Montevideo – Buenos Aires route. She was launched on 11 May 1948. Her passenger certificate was issued on 18 February 1949. Her port of registry was London. The Official Number 182955 and Code Letters GFQD were allocated.

Magdalena left London on her maiden voyage on 9 March 1949, bound for Buenos Aires, Argentina. Her captain, D.R.V. Lee, was on his final voyage before retirement. She called at Las Palmas in the Canary Islands on 15 March, and Rio de Janeiro, Brazil on 24 March. She reached Buenos Aires, where a cargo of 3,000 long tons (3,048 t) of meat was loaded, and called at Santos where a cargo of oranges was loaded. Carrying 237 crew and 347 passengers, she left Santos on 24 April, passing south of the Isle of Moela and the Isle of San Sebastian. Magdalena's course was more northerly than that intended, and adjustments were made twice on the orders of her captain. She passed Boi Point, San Sebastian at 19:56 and her course was altered to pass about 0.5 nmi (0.93 km) north of the Palmas Island Lighthouse, at the entrance to Rio de Janeiro Harbour. Captain Lee retired to bed at about 22:45, leaving written orders to be called when the ship was at a bearing of 315° off the Garituba Lighthouse. As Magdalena was not due at Rio de Janeiro until the morning, her speed was reduced to 13.5 knots (25.0 km/h). At 02:30 on 25 April, she was some 2 to 2.5 nmi (3.7 to 4.6 km) north of her intended position and another adjustment was made to her heading. By 03:30, she was on course and the bearing of 315° to the Guarituba Lighthouse was obtained at 03:49, at which point the captain was called. Having checked that all was well, he left orders to be called at 04:30.

At 04:00, the watch changed; the incoming watch were informed that the ship's course would mean that it would pass close to the Tijucas Rocks. Shortly before 04:30, a fix was obtained which showed that Magdalena was again 1/2 nautical mile (930 m) north of her intended position. Captain Lee was called as ordered and informed that arrival off Palmas Island would be at about 05:07. The first officer, C.J. Senior, then took another fix as he was unsure of the accuracy of the first fix. He had just returned to the bridge when something was seen in the water ahead of them, which the Third Officer took to be a ship without lights. The order "port, 3 degrees" was given, followed by "hard-a-starboard" immediately before Magdalena struck the Tijucas Rocks, located between the Carragas Islands and the Palmas Islands. The time of the grounding was 04:40.

An SOS was broadcast, which was answered by the Brazilian Navy, which sent three submarine chasers and three destroyers to the scene. The passengers were ordered to take to the lifeboats. Tenders and tugs also assisted in the rescue of all passengers from Magdalena without loss of life. The sea conditions at the time were smooth. At 19:00, the steam turbines had to be shut down, and power was then provided by her auxiliary diesel engines. At about 20:00, the submarine chaser Guaporé arrived and started to rescue the passengers. Other ships which assisted in the rescue were the tugs Comandante Triunfo, Dorat, Saturno and Trovão, and also the cargo ship Goiaz.

Magdalena was refloated at 23:34. Her No.3 compartment was flooded and she was down by the bows. Tugs were sent to tow her the 15 nautical miles (28 km) into Rio de Janeiro. The tow started at 07:00 on 26 April, making slow progress, with the ship being towed stern first and making just 3 knots (5.6 km/h). Her bows were drawing 45 feet (14 m) of water. She was abeam of Sugarloaf Mountain when she began to split in two forward of her aft superstructure. This happened as the ship was passing over a sandbank at the harbour mouth, which lay at a depth of about 45 feet (14 m). The anchors were then dropped. The remaining passengers and crew abandoned ship, with the last three leaving just before Magdalena broke up.

The bow section remained at anchor in the Guanabara Bay, The bow section slowly sank, being noticeably deeper in the water by 29 April. It finally sank on 30 April, with its foremast clear of the water marking its position (22°57′05″S 43°7′30″W). Much of her cargo of oranges washed up on Copacabana Beach. Salvage of the bow section was officially abandoned on 7 June. The wreck now lies in 36 to 44 feet (11 to 13 m) of water.

The stern section drifted aground at the opposite side to the bay to where the bow section remained. The passengers' baggage was salvaged, as well as mail being carried. Of her cargo, 450 long tons (457 t) of frozen meat was salvaged, with hopes that a further 300 long tons (305 t) would also be salvageable, as well as 2,000 of the 12,000 cases of oranges. They were shipped to the United Kingdom aboard Highland Brigade. Salvage operations were abandoned on 25 May, and it was decided to sell her remains for scrap.

Magdalena's stern section was towed to Imbuí Bay, and was sold for £50,000. Her steam turbines were used for many years to generate electricity for Manaus. The ship's bell and some other small parts, including some portholes are preserved at the Jurujuba Yacht Club, Niterói. The wreck of the bow section was a hazard to shipping until at least the 1970s, but has since been mostly demolished. It is difficult to dive due to strong currents in the area, poor visibility and anchoring in the busy shipping lane being banned.

On 4 May, Magdalena was declared to be a total loss, making her the sixth ship built by Harland and Wolff to be lost on her maiden voyage.^{[Note 1]} Her insurers paid out £2,295,000 to Royal Mail Lines by cheque on 16 May. At the time, this was the biggest payout for a marine casualty in the United Kingdom. It was decided that a replacement ship would not be built.

== Investigation ==
A preliminary enquiry into Magdalena's was held at Rio de Janeiro by the British Consul-General, who sent a report to the Minister of Transport, who ordered that a Court of Formal Investigation be held. The enquiry was held at the Royal Courts of Justice, London on 26–28 September 1949 with J. V. Naisby KC in charge, assisted by Captains Grimston and Williamson, and a Mr. Gray. Evidence was heard that the ship was seaworthy, and that the provision of rescue equipment on board either met or exceeded the required standard. The course selected was deemed to be correct, but the navigation of the ship was defective, with insufficient attention being paid to compass errors. Captain Lee had his master's certificate suspended for two years. First Officer C.J. Senior had his certificate suspended for a year, being allowed to hold a second mate's certificate during this time. These suspensions were effective from the date of the report's release on 3 October 1949.

== Reunion ==
In April 1996 a reunion was held at Belfast of people who had either helped to build or worked on board Magdalena. It was organised by the Lagan Legacy heritage organisation. Four of the seven people contacted attended the reunion, with one coming from Australia.

== Notes ==
1. The others were Queensmore in 1889, RMS Titanic in 1912, Brecknockshire in 1916, Treveal in 1920, and RFA Dinsdale in 1942. Brecknockshire and Dinsdale were lost due to enemy action.
