= Principality of Outer Baldonia =

Defunct Micronation in Nova Scotia, Canada

Coordinates: 43°36′N 66°01.5′W

- Micronation (unrecognized entity)
- Area claimed: Portion of Outer Bald Tusket Island, off the coast of Nova Scotia
- Claimed by: Russell Arundel
- Dates claimed: 1949–1973

The Principality of Outer Baldonia is a defunct micronation that claimed sovereignty over approximately 4 acres (16,000 m^{2}) of Outer Bald Tusket Island, the southernmost of the Tusket Islands off the southern tip of the Canadian province of Nova Scotia.

Flag of Outer Baldonia

Founded in 1949 by American businessman Russell Arundel, the principality had a charter, a flag, currency, passports, and an organized military. Its membership consisted of 69 fishermen. All citizens of the principality who caught a Bluefin tuna and paid a $50 fee were accorded the rank of prince. Its government officials included Prince of Princes Russell Arundel, Chancellor Elson Boudreau, and Ambassador Extraordinary and Minister Plenipotentiary Ron Wallace. The text of the Charter of Outer Baldonia is preserved in the Yarmouth County Museum.

After the Soviet state publication Literaturnaya Gazeta published a critique of the charter of Outer Baldonia, Outer Baldonia declared war on the Soviet Union on March 9, 1953. The Soviets issued a series of condemnations through their various press outlets, and press coverage exposed the principality as a humorous half-truth.

In 1973, Outer Bald Tusket Island was sold by Russell Arundel for the price of one dollar to the Nova Scotia Bird Society. The island was designated the Earle E. Arundel Breeding Bird Sanctuary. In 2015, the Nova Scotia Bird Society partnered with the Nova Scotia Nature Trust to donate the Bald Islands as conservation lands.

== Play ==
Canadian playwright A.J. Demers wrote a one-act play based on the story of Outer Baldonia, entitled Whimsy State (or The Principality of Outer Baldonia). The inaugural production of the play happened at the Lunchbox Theatre in Calgary in May 2012. In 2019, Demers published the script through Playwrights Canada Press.

== See also ==
- Micronation
- List of micronations
