= Maiden Voyage =

A maiden voyage is the first trip of a ship or boat in its intended role. Maiden voyage may also refer to:

- Maiden Voyage (Herbie Hancock album), released 1965
  - "Maiden Voyage" (composition), the album's title track
- Maiden Voyage (Ramsey Lewis album), released 1968
- Maiden Voyage (Alice in Videoland album), released 2003
- Maiden Voyage, a 2004 album by Bounding Main
- Maiden Voyage, a 2010 album by Salyu
- "Maiden Voyage", the seventy-first episode of Code Lyoko
- Maiden Voyage (novel), a novel by Denton Welch
- "Maiden Voyage", theme song for History Channel television series Ice Road Truckers (season 7–11) by Andy Kubiszewski

== See also ==
- List of ships lost on their maiden voyage
