= Tusket Islands =

Island in the country of Canada

Coordinates: 43°39′08″N 66°00′50″W

Tusket Islands in Nova Scotia

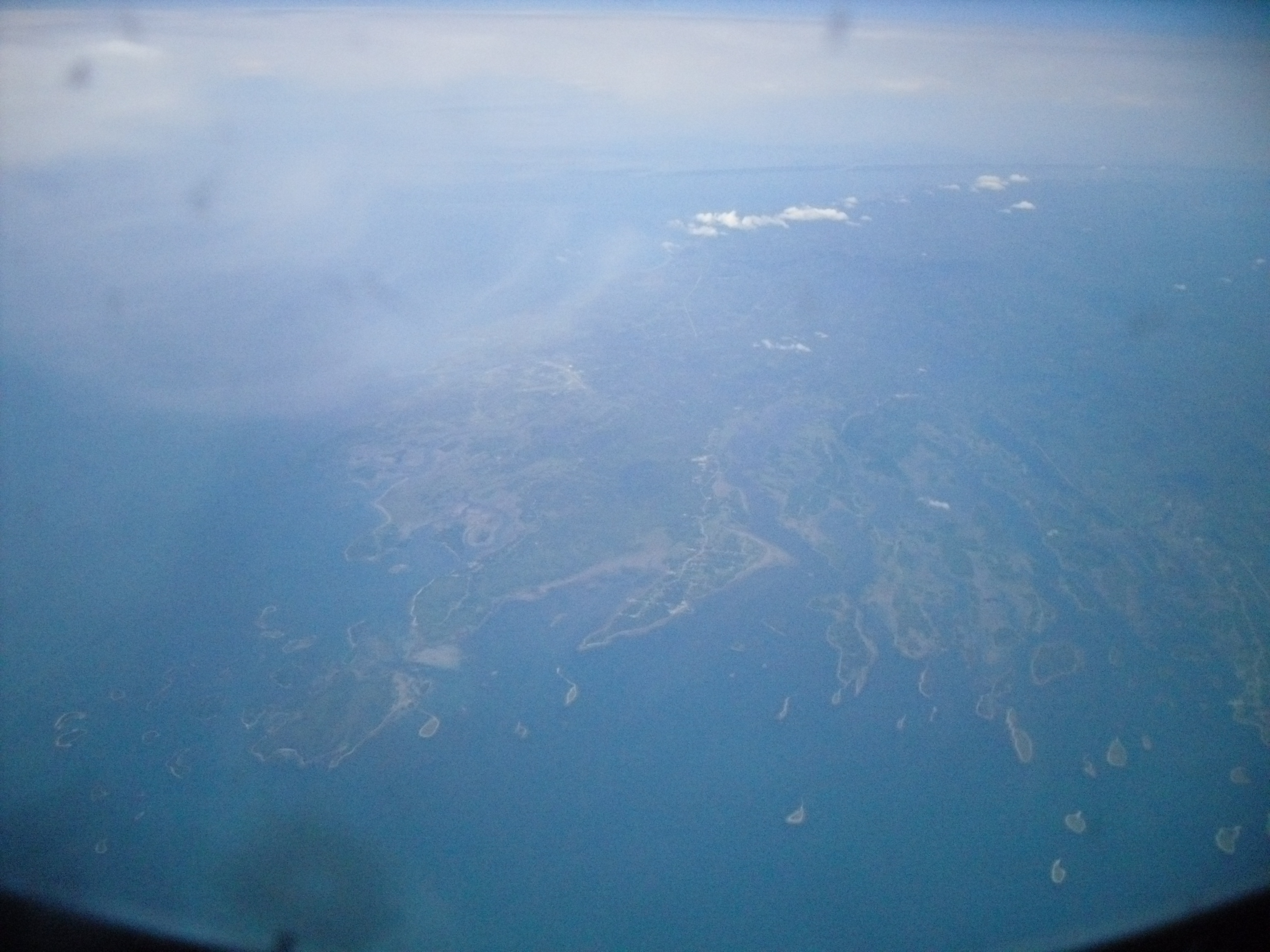
A bird's eye view of the islands

The Tusket Islands are an archipelago of small islands located in the Atlantic Ocean off the southwestern coast of Nova Scotia, Canada, at the entrance to the Bay of Fundy.

Local lore suggests there are 365 islands total, one for each day of the year, although actual estimates simply say 200+ islands. Their economy is based on lobster trapping, although its many canneries have since closed, leaving largely only fishing shanties behind. In the years around 1924, many of the fishing vessels in the islands were converted into rum runners smuggling alcohol to the United States.

== History ==
In 1633, Jean de Laite referred to the islands as "Isles aux Tangneux" in his work The New World. The Mi'kmaq referred to the islands as "Aglassawakade," or "place of the English."

There are two separate beliefs in buried treasure in the islands; one is a belief that pirate treasure is hidden on one of the islands.

There is also an unrelated history of Acadians facing deportation burying their family wealth among the Tusket Islands, and later writing letters to relatives about how to find and reclaim it.

Several dwellings were built on the islands during early decades of European settlement.

On December 14 and December 15, 1909, the Canadian government fisheries patrol vessel Curlew seized and destroyed nearly 800 illegally-set lobster traps in the Tusket Islands area in an effort to curb poaching in advance of the official season opening day on December 16. The captain of the Curlew reported that the United States government intended to deploy a cruiser on the Maine coast to similarly protect the Maine lobster fishery.

In February 1942, the SS West Jaffrey sank after hitting a rock in the Tusket Islands - with a cargo of explosives, warplanes and other materiel.

== Geography ==
The islands stretch along the coast from Pinkney's Point to Wedgeport. Big Tusket Island has the highest elevation at 31 metres and Bald Tusket Island has an elevation of 16 metres.

Morris Island and Surette Island maintain small populations, as they are connected to the mainland by causeways or reachable at low tide.

The islands include:

- Allen Island
- Bald Islands

- Mossy Bald Island
- Half Bald Island
- Middle Bald Island
- Inner Bald Tusket Island
- Outer Bald Tusket Island - Location of the micronation Principality of Outer Baldonia.

- Big Tusket Island (also known as St. Martin's Island), a causeway was proposed to be built but never was.
- Calf Island
- Candlebox Island
- Deep Cove Island, had its own barbershop, leather tanner, blacksmith, cobbler, post office and pool hall to support its canneries.
- Dog Island
- Eagle Island
- Ellenwood Island
- Green Island
- Harris Island
- Haymaker Island
- Holmes Island
- Marks Island
- Murder Island
- Owls Head Island
- Pease Island
- Pumpkin Island
- Spectacle Island
- Tarpaulin Island
- Turpentine Island
