= Murder Island =

Island in Nova Scotia, Canada

Coordinates: 43°40′27″N 66°03′30″W

Murder Island (also known as Île du Massacre) is the northwestern-most Tusket Island, off the western coast of Nova Scotia, Canada, at the mouth of the Bay of Fundy. There is a shoal spit extending from the northwestern edge of Murder Island. There is a light buoy west of the island, with red and white vertical stripes marked "NSH".

Many explanations have been offered for the large number of human skeletons on the island, ranging from the mysterious disappearance of the crew and Irish convict labourers aboard the Baltimore with Susannah Buckler, to extermination of slaves tied to the Oak Island treasure mystery, to indigenous battles between tribes or with settlers.

From 1798 to 1818 the island was owned by Henry Shortliffe, who then sold it for £5 to Joseph Robbins of Chebogue, who used it to graze sheep and cattle. While Robbins was petitioning the government to give him the grant to the island, they instead granted it to Othneal Beals – who then sold his interest to Robbins for £7 in 1819. The matter arose again in 1842, when Robbins sought formal recognition but was met by opposition from Acadien fishermen who insisted the British Crown should hold the islands to allow for public fishing. But in 1848, the Land Board decision to deny him the island was overturned, and the House of Assembly formally recognised Robbins's ownership.

== Shipwrecks ==
The schooner W. Smith O'Brien ran ashore on Murder Island on December 4, 1847, and was destroyed, although its cargo of flour was saved. In 1876, the schooner Abby Wasson struck Murder Island and filled with water. In 1887, the lobster packer Harry Moore drowned on the island. In 1918, the steamer Bruce Cann was destroyed on the island.

From 2016 to 2022, the wreck of the Don Cadegan sat on the island.
