= SS Dumaru =

American wooden steam ship (1918)

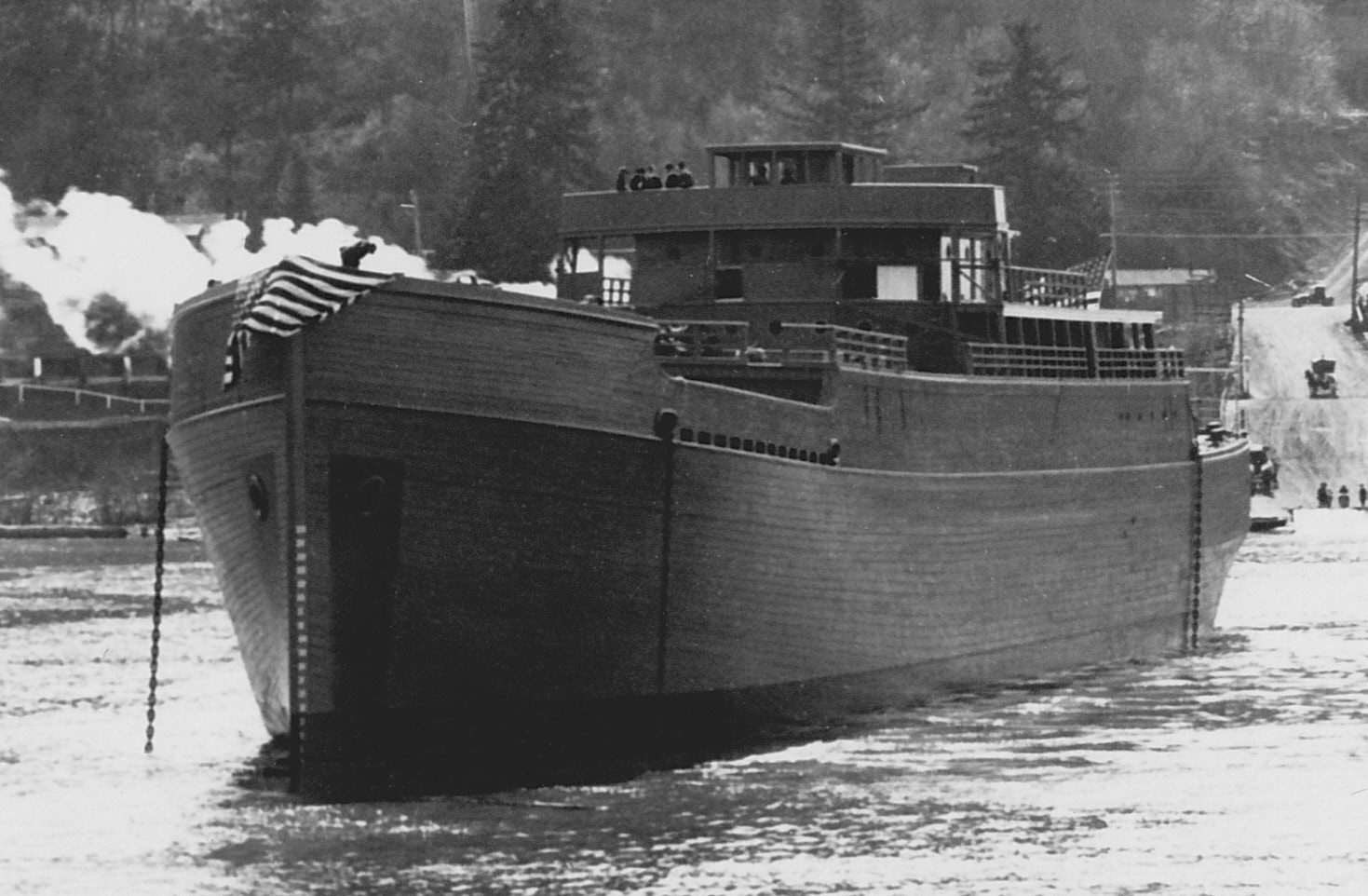
- SS Dumaru in the Willamette River, Portland, Oregon, on April 17, 1918.

History

United States
- Name: SS Dumaru
- Owner: United States Shipping Board
- Builder: Grant Smith-Porter Ship Co.
- Laid down: November 17, 1917
- Launched: April 17, 1918
- Fate: Exploded and sank October 16, 1918

General characteristics
- Type: Hough
- Length: 268 Feet

SS Dumaru was a Design 1003, Hough-type wooden steam ship launched on April 17, 1918, in Portland, Oregon, as part of the United States Shipping Board Merchant Fleet Corporation. On October 16, 1918, during her maiden voyage, Dumaru was struck by lightning off the coast of Guam, igniting her munitions cargo and destroying the ship.

All hands were able to evacuate into two lifeboats and one raft prior to Dumaru´s destruction, with the raft and its five passengers, including Captain Ole Berrensen, being rescued nine days later near the site of the sinking.

The two lifeboats, one undermanned with only nine of its 20 seats filled and the other severely overcrowded with 32 crewmen aboard, drifted for approximately three weeks across the Pacific Ocean to the Philippine Islands. The latter boat quickly exhausted its fresh water supply, forcing the crew to construct a crude water desalination device and eventually resort to cannibalism, consuming the bodies of other crewmen who had died of exposure.

== Bibliography ==
- Thomas, Lowell (1930). The Wreck of the Dumaru. Garden City, New York: Doubleday, Doran & Company, Inc.
- Holbrook, Stewart B. (June 11, 1933). "When the Jinx Cruised With the Dumaru". Sunday Oregonian. pp. Magazine Section.
