= SS Treveal (1919) =

Harland & Wolff cargo ship, wrecked 1920

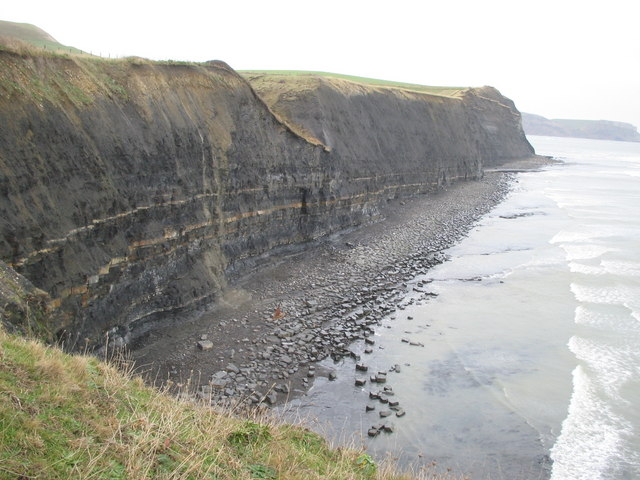
Kimmeridge Ledges

SS Treveal was a cargo ship that sank on its maiden voyage on 9 January 1920, in one of the deadliest maritime incidents off the Jurassic Coast on the English Channel coast of southern England.

== History ==
Treveal was built by Harland & Wolff. Owned by the Hain Steamship Co. Ltd., it was steam powered. In early 1920, the vessel was on a voyage from Calcutta, India, to Dundee, Scotland, carrying a cargo of jute and manganese ore. On 9 January 1920, the ship was wrecked off the Dorset coast in extremely stormy conditions. It broke in two after running aground on Kimmeridge Ledge below St Aldhelms Head, and finally sank just outside Chapman's Pool.

The next morning, the crew was rescued by lifeboats, though 36 of the 43 men were lost. Among those confirmed dead was Ernest Henry Hutchinson, the first mate and a veteran of the First World War. Most of the bodies were interred in the churchyard at Worth Matravers. Reverend Horace Piercey and local fisherman Frank Lander were awarded bronze medals by the Royal Humane Society for their part in the rescue. The cargo was salvaged, but little of the ship now remains. The Board of Trade subsequently launched an inquiry into the sinking.

== See also ==
- List of ships lost on their maiden voyage
- List of shipwrecks in 1920
- List of ships built by Harland & Wolff
