= SS Hastier (1919) =

Coordinates: 49.4204°N 2.6275°W

History
- Name: Hastier
- Owner: Lloyd Royal Belge SA
- Port of registry: (Belgium) Antwerp
- Builder: Scheepsbouwwerf & Maschinenfabriek De Klop
- Yard number: 131
- Launched: 1919
- Completed: March 1919
- Maiden voyage: 9 April 1919
- Out of service: On or after 13 April 1919
- Fate: Sank

General characteristics
- Tonnage: 749 GRT
- Installed power: Triple expansion steam engine
- Propulsion: Screw propeller
- Crew: 17

SS Hastier was a 749 GRT coaster which sank on her maiden voyage in April 1919.

== Description ==
Hastier was built as yard number 131 by Scheepsbouwwerf & Maschinenfabriek De Klop, Sliedrecht, Netherlands. Assessed at 749 GRT, she was powered by a triple expansion steam engine.

== History ==
Hastier was built for Lloyd Royal Belge, SA. Her port of registry was Antwerp. She departed Antwerp on her maiden voyage on 9 April 1919, bound for Brixham, United Kingdom where she loaded a cargo of coal. On 13 April, she departed Brixham bound for Barcelona, Spain, with an ultimate destination of Valencia. She was not heard from again, and no trace was found of her until 21 June when SS Courier found a damaged lifeboat 1 nautical mile (1.9 km) south east of Lower Head, near the Russell Channel Buoy. The lifeboat was landed at Guernsey. Captain Fierens and his crew of 16 were all lost with the ship.
