= Adolf Vinnen (barquentine) =

German sailing vessel

Coordinates: 49°57′53″N 5°11′00″W

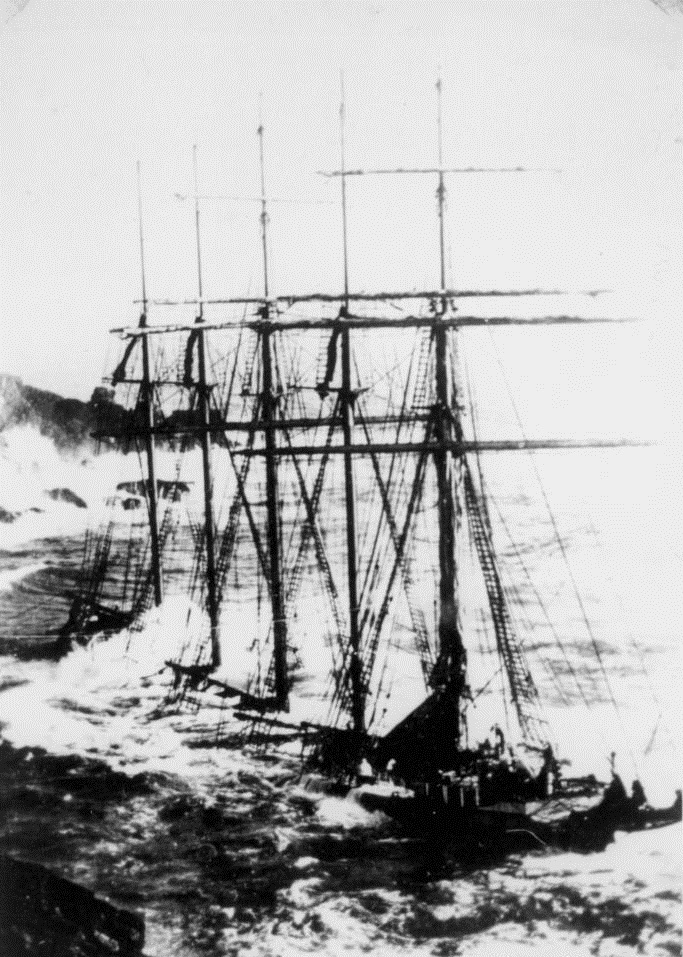
- Adolf Vinnen at Bass Point

History

Germany
- Name: Adolf Vinnen
- Owner: F A Vinnen & Co
- Port of registry: (Weimar Republic) Bremen, Germany
- Builder: Friedrich Krupp Germaniawerft
- Yard number: 420
- Launched: December 1922
- In service: February 1923
- Out of service: 9 February 1923
- Fate: Wrecked 1923

General characteristics
- Tonnage: 1,840 GRT
- Length: 79.90 m (262 ft 2 in)
- Beam: 10.40 m (34 ft 1 in)
- Depth: 5.80 m (19 ft 0 in)
- Propulsion: Sails, two diesel engines.
- Sail plan: Barquentine
- Complement: Up to 45

Adolf Vinnen was a five-masted barquentine that was built by Friedrich Krupp Germaniawerft, Kiel, Germany. She was wrecked on her maiden voyage in 1923.

== Description ==
Adolf Vinnen was a 1,849 GRT five-masted barquentine. She was 79.90 metres (262 ft 2 in) long, with a beam of 10.40 metres (34 ft 1 in) and a depth of 5.80 metres (19 ft 0 in). She was propelled by sails and two 350 horsepower (260 kW) 4-cylinder diesel engines. She was designed for a crew of 45.

== History ==
Adolf Vinnen was built in 1922 by Friedrich Krupp Germaniawerft, Kiel. Launched in December 1922, she was yard number 420. She was built for F A Vinnen & Co, Bremen.

She was one of the five Vinnen sisters, identical ships built by Krupps around 1921–1922 for F A Vinnen of Bremen. These were the Carl Vinnen, Adolf Vinnen, Christle Vinnen, Werner Vinnen and Sussane Vinnen. The four masted steel auxiliary, Magdalene Vinnen was a 3476 ton barque constructed to a separate design in the same year and in the same yard.

On 9 February 1923, during her maiden voyage from Kiel Germany to Barry, Glamorgan, Wales, Adolf Vinnen was driven ashore at Bass Point, Cornwall, United Kingdom in a gale. The Lizard lifeboat attended the ship, Her crew of 24 was rescued by breeches buoy from the cliffs above the wreck. Adolf Vinnen was the last large sailing ship wrecked in the Lizard area. The wreck lies in 12 metres (39 ft) of water.
