= January 1920 =

Month in 1920

| << | January 1920 | | | | | >> |
| Su | Mo | Tu | We | Th | Fr | Sa |
| | | | | 1 | 2 | 3 |
| 4 | 5 | 6 | 7 | 8 | 9 | 10 |
| 11 | 12 | 13 | 14 | 15 | 16 | 17 |
| 18 | 19 | 20 | 21 | 22 | 23 | 24 |
| 25 | 26 | 27 | 28 | 29 | 30 | 31 |

January 10, 1920: Treaty of Versailles goes into effect, changing map of Europe

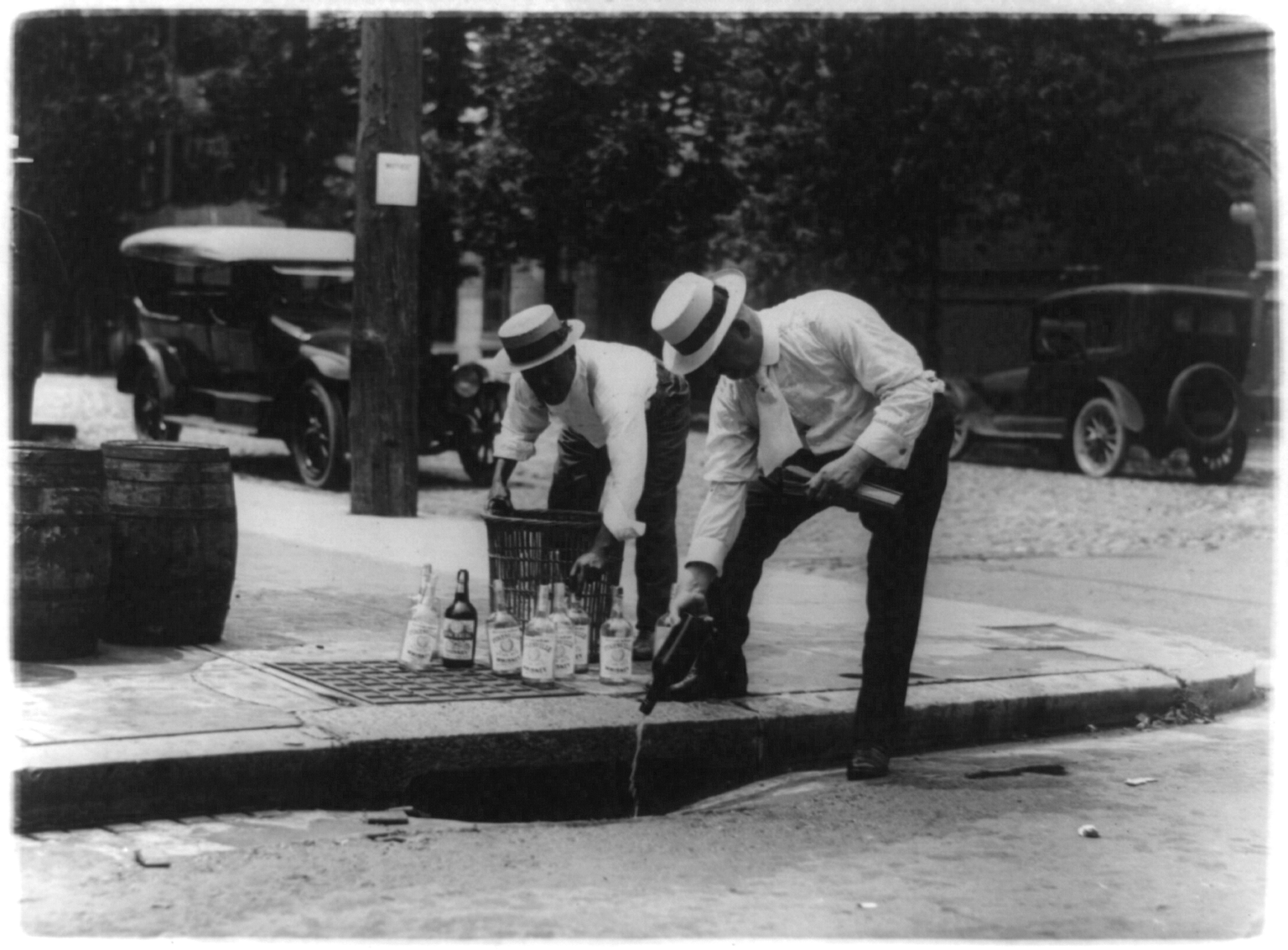
January 17, 1920: Possession of alcohol and beer no longer allowed outside the home in the U.S.

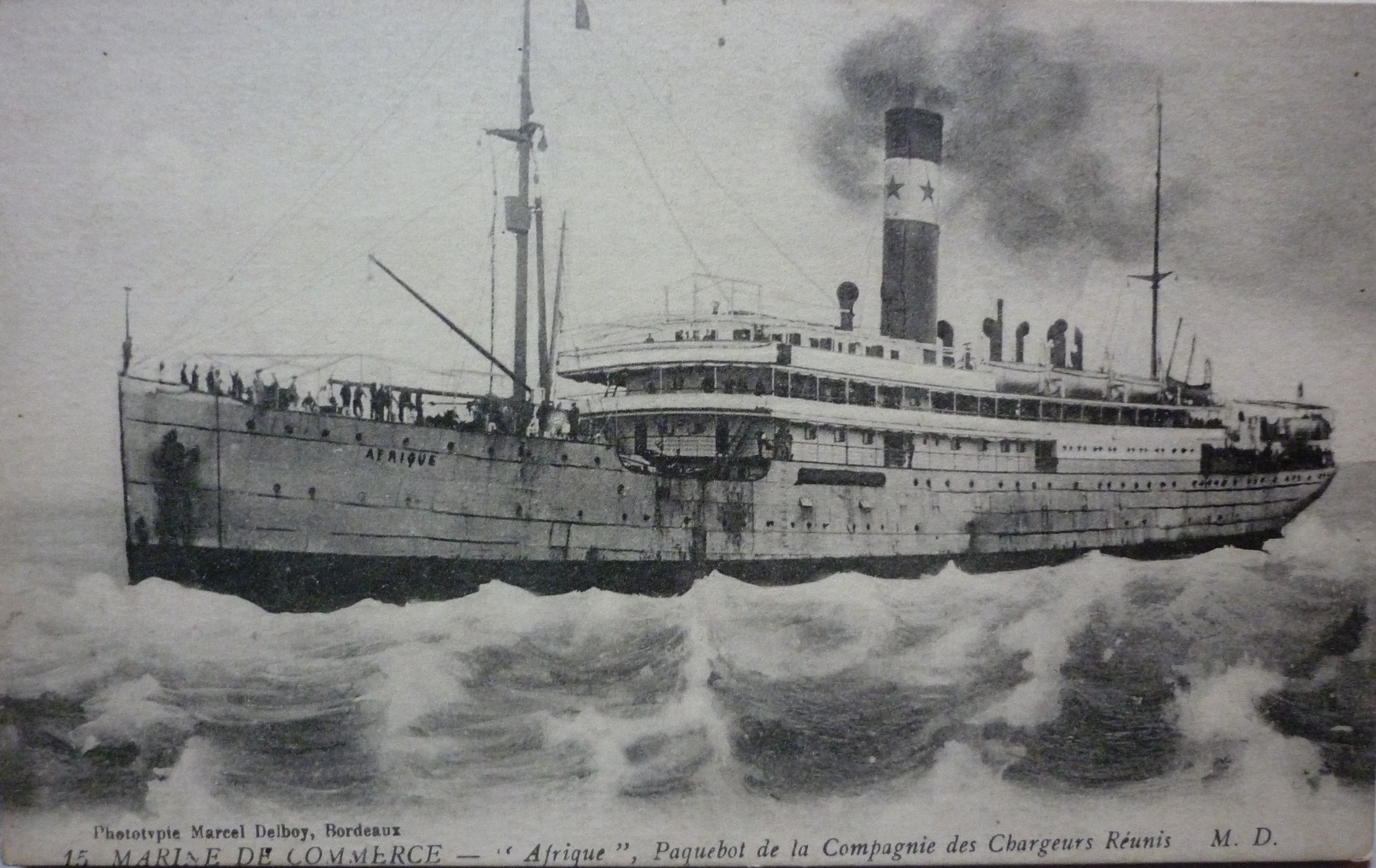
January 12, 1920: French cruise ship SS Afrique sinks, killing 575 of its 609 passengers and crew

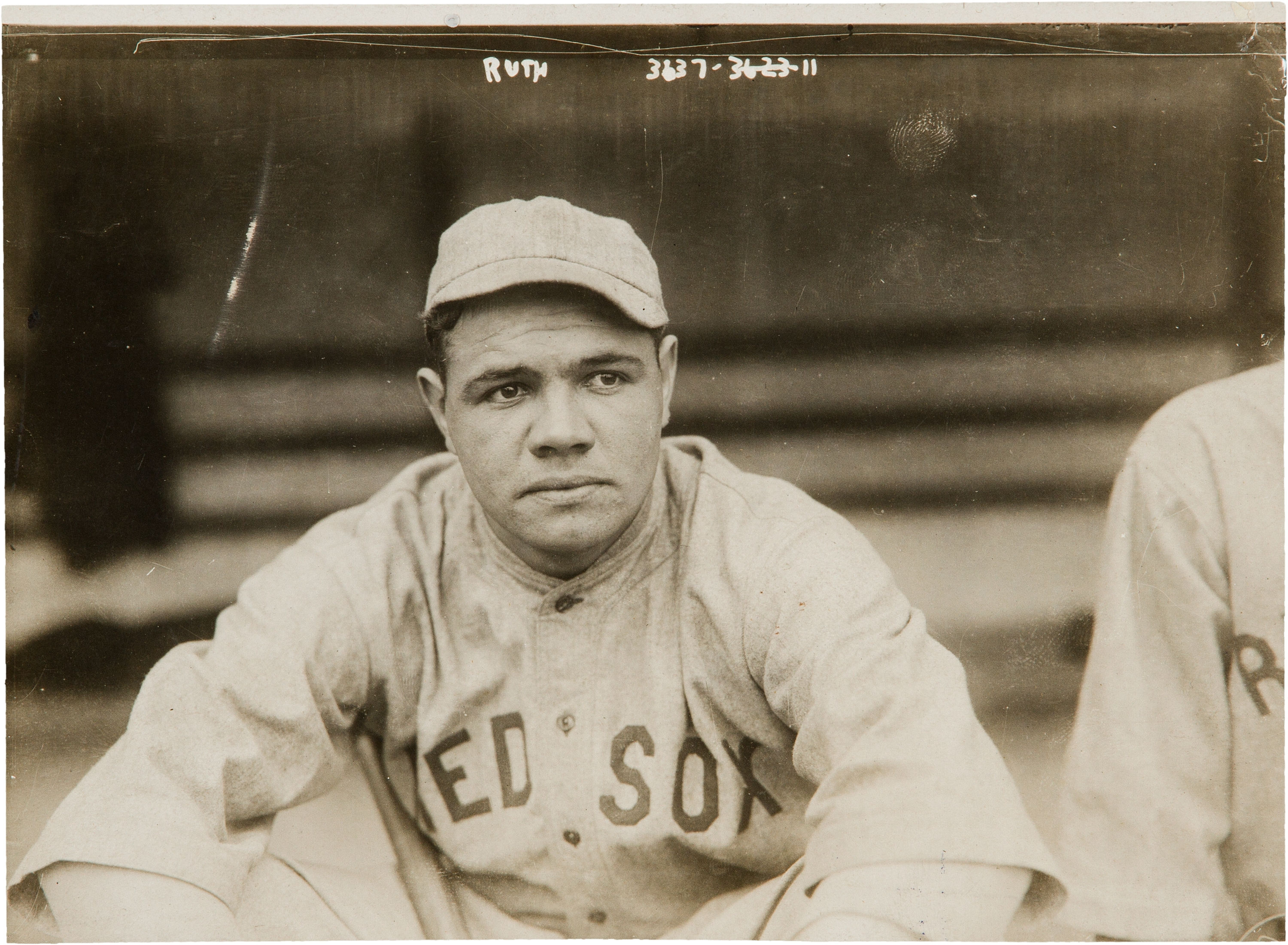
January 5, 1920: Boston Red Sox sell rights for Babe Ruth to New York Yankees

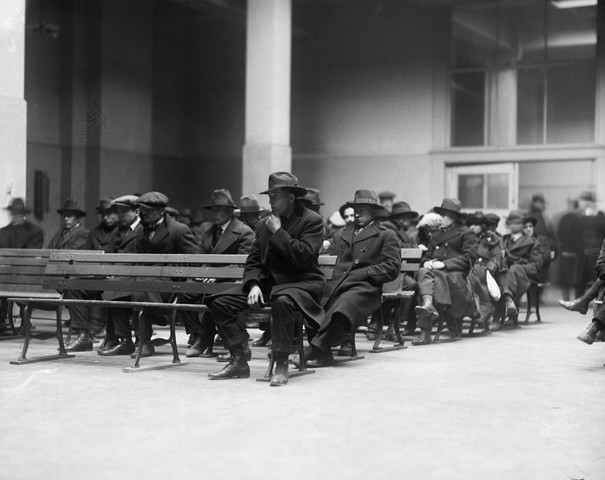
January 2, 1920: U.S. arrests 4,025 suspected Communists and anarchists

The following events occurred in January 1920:

== January 1, 1920 (Thursday) ==
- Harvard University narrowly defeated the University of Oregon, 7 to 6, in the Tournament of Roses East-West Football Game held at Pasadena, California, between the two teams chosen by the tournament committee as the best in the eastern and western United States. All of the scoring came in the second quarter, on a field goal by Oregon's Bill Steers, a 13-yard touchdown run by Fred Church and Arnold Horween's extra point kick for Harvard, and another field goal by Clifford "Skeet" Manerud. In the final minutes of the game, two Oregon field goal tries by Steers were blocked, and a final try by Manerud from the 20 yard line missed by a few inches Harvard, then an independent, was undefeated and went into the game with an 8-0-1 record; it had outscored its opponents 229 to 19 in the 1919 college football season. Oregon had a 5-1-0 record in the Pacific Coast Conference, and had given the other 5-1-0 team, the University of Washington, its only loss. The event, which is now called the Rose Bowl, was the only post-season college football game at the time.
- At 4:00 in the afternoon on the first day of the year, Chicago police began raids on 300 suspected "open and secret gathering places" of "radical cults" in an effort by Chicago's state prosecutor to "wipe out Bolshevism." Hoyne accused U.S. Attorney General A. Mitchell Palmer of "playing petty politics" and "pursuing a pussyfoot policy" by failing to aid Chicago in the roundup of subversives. Palmer would begin his own raids the following day. The raid led to 4,025 arrests of accused communists and anarchists in more than 30 cities. Among the persons arrested was international opera star Georges Baklanoff of Russia (who was quickly released) on the affidavit of a former girlfriend.
- The United Kingdom's Union of Post Office Workers began operations following the 1919 merger of three labor unions, the Postmen's Federation, Postal and Telegraph Clerks' Association and the Fawcett Association.
- Already plagued with post-defeat inflation, the Imperial Bank of Germany printed an additional 1.4 billion marks and placed it into circulation, bringing the total of paper money in Germany to 47,724,000,000 marks.
- The Russian Red Army increased its troops along its border with Poland from four divisions to 20.
- Born:
  - José Antonio Bottiroli, Argentinean classical music composer; in Rosario(d. 1990)
  - Heinz Zemanek, Austrian computer pioneer, designed the transistorized Mailüfterl computer; in Vienna (d. 2014)
  - Elisabeth Andersen, Dutch stage actress, three-time winner of the Theo d'Or award; as Anna Elisabeth de Brujin, in The Hague (d. 2018)
- Died: Zygmunt Gorazdowski, 74, Polish Roman Catholic priest, founded the Sisters of Saint Joseph, canonized as a saint in 2005 (b. 1845)

== January 2, 1920 (Friday) ==
- Counting began for the 1920 United States census, the 14th decennial census taken since the 1789 adoption of the U.S. Constitution. The U.S. Census Bureau predicted that the count would show that the United States now had more than 100,000,000 people, an increase over the 1910 final count of 92,228,496.
- At the Cook County Jail in Chicago, Charles W. Peters (Cook County sheriff) carried out a "psychological experiment" by having a prisoner executed in front of 200 of his fellow inmates. Prisoners were transferred to cells overlooking the jail courtyard, where a scaffold had been erected, and double-murderer Raffaelo Durrago was hanged at sunrise. Despite objections by Illinois Governor Frank Orren Lowden, who asked the sheriff and jailer W.T. Davies not to make a spectacle of the hanging, the sentence was carried out as planned. Sheriff Peters said in a statement afterward that "well-meaning, but misguided" reformers had "destroyed the fear of punishment by criminals" and that mere incarceration was no longer a deterrent to repeat offenders.
- Born:
  - Isaac Asimov, Russian-born American science and science fiction author; as Izaak Azimov, in Petrovichi, Russian SFSR Soviet Union) (d. 1992)
  - George Herbig, American astronomer, known for discovery of Herbig–Haro objects; in Wheeling, West Virginia (d. 2013)
  - Anne-Sofie Østvedt, Norwegian resistance leader, member of XU intelligence group during World War II; in Christiania (present-day Oslo) (d. 2009)
- Died: Frank Lascelles, 78, British diplomat, UK Ambassador to Persia, Russia and Germany (b. 1841)

== January 3, 1920 (Saturday) ==
- Hundreds of people were killed in an earthquake in Mexico, with an epicenter near the Pico de Orizaba in Veracruz state. Although initial reports were that thousands of people had died, the final death toll of the 7.8 magnitude quake was 648 people. The area was rocked by a tremor for five minutes starting at 9:45 in the evening, with the most intense damage happening forty minutes later at 10:25 p.m. Hardest hit were the villages of Teocelo and Couzatlan.
- Troops from Poland and Latvia (referred to at the time by the North American and British press as "Lettland") retook the city of Dvinsk from control of the Bolshevik army. The Latvians subsequently renamed the city Daugavpils.
- U.S. Attorney General Palmer told newspaper reporters that the roundup of subversives came after discovery of a plot by radical leaders "to overthrow the government and seize control of the country" and to create a Soviet-style system to rule in its place. Palmer cited the Chicago convention of the Communist Party of America and a manifesto adopted on September 1 as advocacy for the overthrow "by force and violence".
- The city of Yuma, Arizona, was without sunshine all day long for the first time since 1874, according to residents of the desert locale. A steady rainfall pelted the usually-dry town after 45 years with minimal precipitation.
- Born: Renato Carosone, Italian musician and singer, known for his 1958 hit song Torero; as Renato Carusone, in Naples (d. 2001)
- Died: Zygmunt Janiszewski, 31, Polish mathematician; died of the Spanish flu (b. 1888)

== January 4, 1920 (Sunday) ==
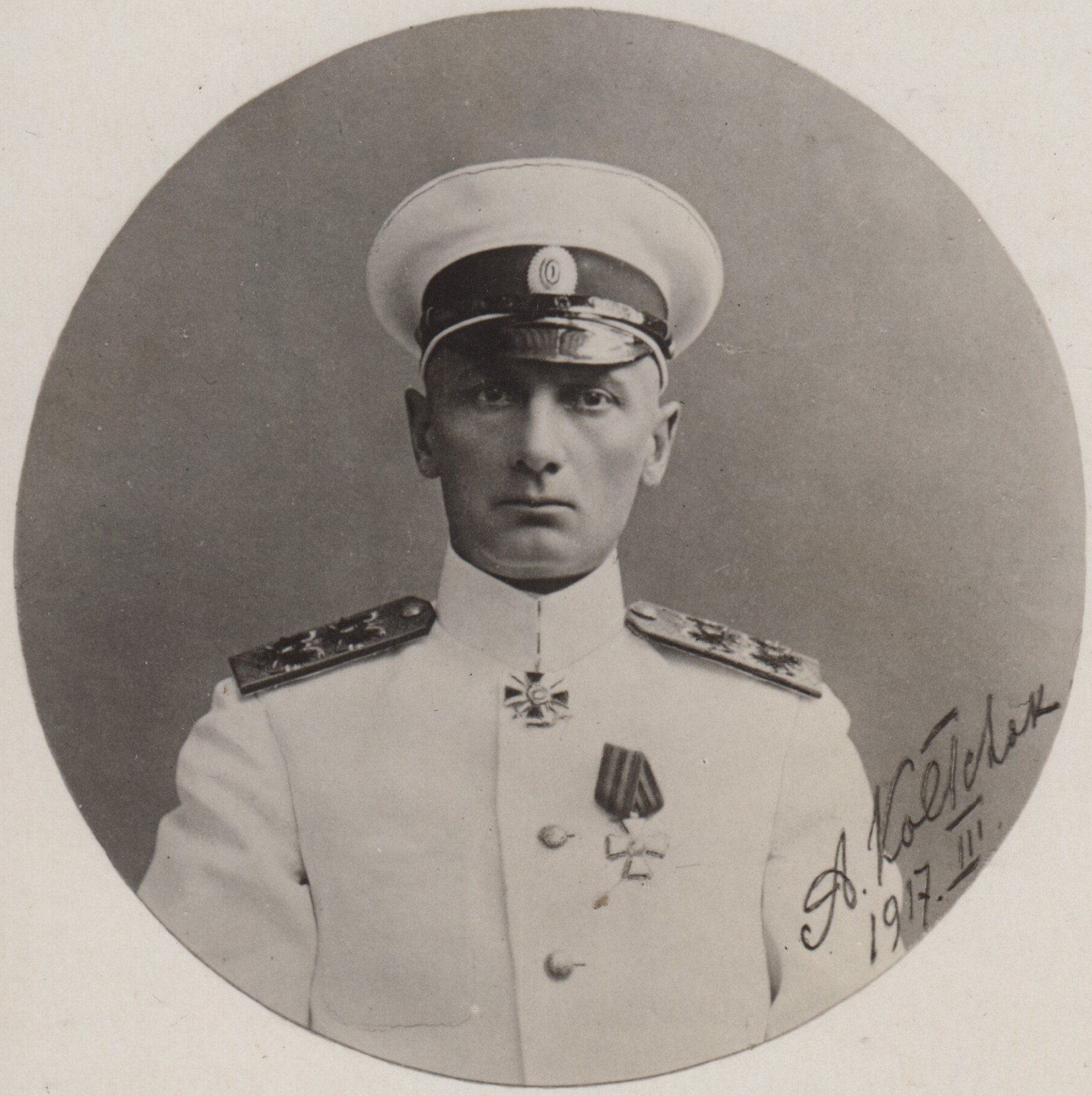
Admiral Kolchak

- Imperial Russian Navy Admiral Alexander Kolchak, recognized by the Allied Powers as "Supreme Leader of Russia" after the Armistice that ended World War I in 1918, resigned his post and transferred his authority as commander of the White Army to General Grigory Semyonov. Kolchak then departed Krasnoyarsk ahead of the arrival of the Bolsheviks of the Red Army, traveling on a train to Irkutsk, where he had been promised safe passage to the west under Allied protection.
- Died:
  - Benito Pérez Galdós, 76, Spanish novelist, leading literary figure in 19th century Spain (b. 1843)
  - Manuel de la Cámara, 84, Spanish naval officer, leader of Spanish operations during the Spanish–American War (b. 1836)
  - Thomas Richard Fraser, 78, British physician and physiologist (b. 1841)

== January 5, 1920 (Monday) ==
- Babe Ruth of the Boston Red Sox, the most famous player in Major League Baseball and the American League's home run leader in 1919 (with 29 homers), was sent to the New York Yankees after Red Sox owner Harry Frazee was paid a sum of at least $100,000 ($1.3 million a century later) for the rights to Ruth's contract. Frazee, already struggling financially from his purchase of the Red Sox, balked at paying Ruth's salary demand of $20,000 ($264,000 equivalent) for the 1920 baseball season.
- Born: Arturo Benedetti Michelangeli, Italian classical pianist; in Brescia (d. 1995)

== January 6, 1920 (Tuesday) ==
- The League of Women Voters was created by the merger of the National Council of Women Voters and the National American Woman Suffrage Association.
- Prince Faisal ibn-Hussein al-Hashemi of Syria and Prime Minister Georges Clemenceau agreed privately in Paris that France would recognize limited autonomy for Syria under a League of Nations mandate, with Faisal as the King of Syria responsible for the nation's internal affairs.
- Kentucky and Rhode Island both ratified the proposed Nineteenth Amendment to the United States Constitution (providing for universal women's suffrage) on the same day, each as their first order of business in the opening of their 1920 sessions. In Kentucky, the measure passed 72 to 25 in the state House of Representatives and 30 to 8 in the state Senate, while the vote in Rhode Island was unanimous in the state Senate and 80 to 3 in the state House. In doing so, they became the 23rd and 24th of the 48 states to ratify, with 36 needed for the process to be completed. Oregon, Indiana, and Wyoming ratified later in January, but South Carolina rejected the amendment during the month.
- Born:
  - Sun Myung Moon, Korean religious leader, founder of the Unification Church, colloquially known as "the Moonies"; as Mun Yong-myeong in Chongju, Chōsen, Empire of Japan (present-day North Korea) (d. 2012)
  - Early Wynn, American baseball pitcher, inductee into the Baseball Hall of Fame; in Hartford, Alabama (d. 1999)
  - John Maynard Smith, British theoretical evolutionary biologist; in Lewes, East Sussex (d. 2004)
- Died:
  - Heinrich Lammasch, 66, the last Prime Minister of the Austrian lands of the Austro-Hungarian Empire (Cisleithania), for the final two weeks of the Empire's existence (b. 1853)
  - Lord Cunliffe, 64, British banker, served as Governor of the Bank of England from 1913 to 1918 during Britain's involvement in World War I (b. 1855)
  - Hieronymus Zeuthen, 80, Danish mathematician, known for the original proposal of the Zeuthen–Segre invariant (b. 1839)

== January 7, 1920 (Wednesday) ==
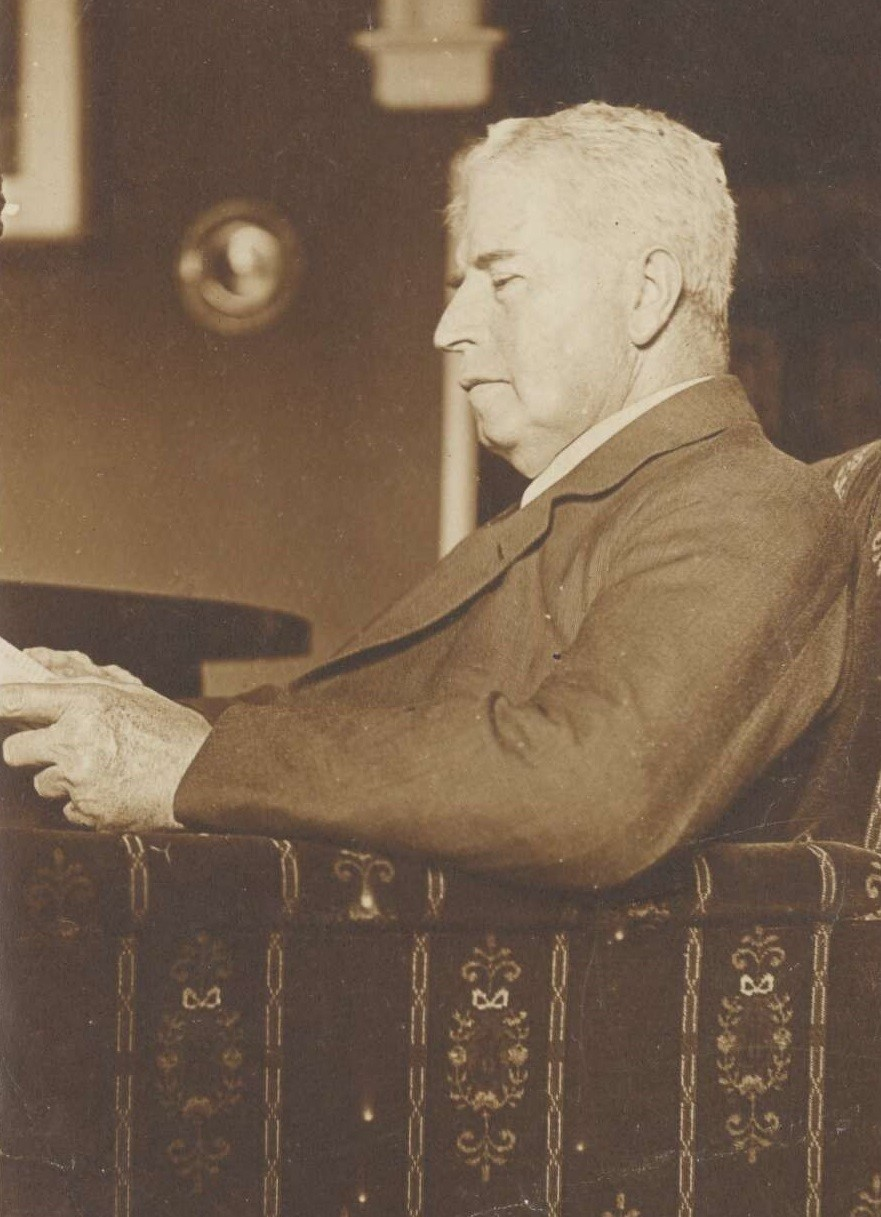
Sir Edmond Barton

- In the Russian Civil War between the Red Army of Bolsheviks and the White Army of Mensheviks, members of the Whites formerly under the command of Admiral Alexander Kolchak surrendered at Krasnoyarsk. The defeated rebels were then forced by the Bolshevik government to march to exile in Siberia.
- The New York State Assembly voted to bar five recently elected members of the Socialist Party of America from being seated, in spite of their election to office. After the members voted, 140 to 6, to make an inquiry into whether the Socialists could be loyal to their oath, the five men were informed that they would have to prove their loyalty to the satisfaction of a tribunal of the Assembly. Those affected were August Claessens and Louis Waldman of Manhattan, Sam De Witt and Samuel Orr of the Bronx, and Charles Solomon of Kings County. All five would be expelled from the Assembly without being allowed to take office.
- Born: Vincent Gardenia, Italian-born American film and TV actor; as Vincenzo Gardenia Scognamiglio, in Naples (d. 1992)
- Died:
  - Sir Edmund Barton, 70, Australian politician, first Prime Minister of Australia from 1901 to 1903, founding justice on the High Court of Australia (b. 1849)
  - Hunter Corbett, 84, American Presbyterian Missionary, established one of the earliest universities in China (b. 1835)

== January 8, 1920 (Thursday) ==
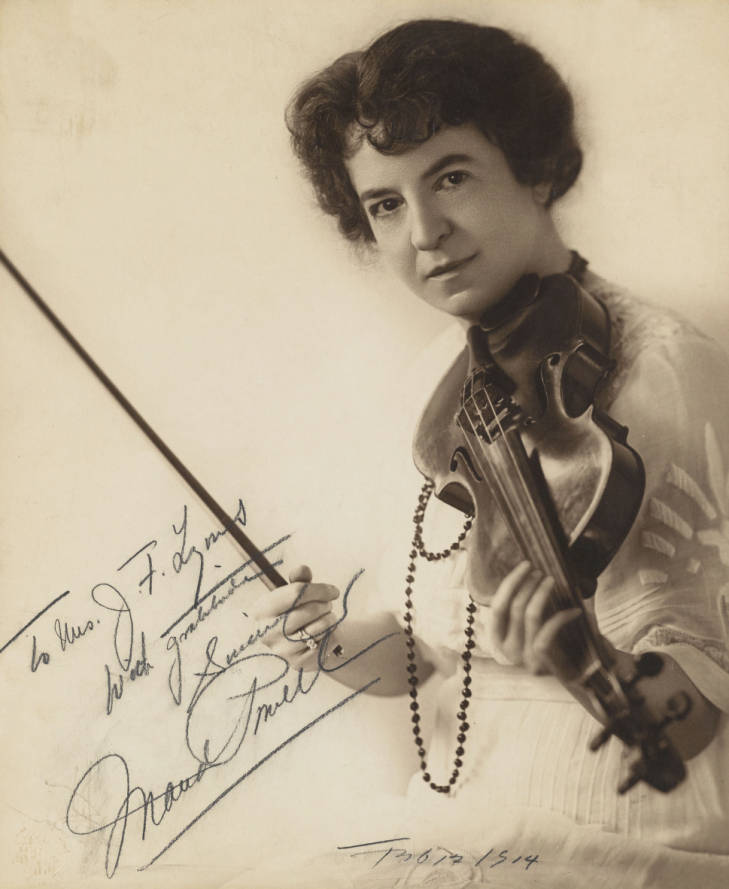
Maud Powell

- The Amalgamated Association of Iron and Steel Workers, predecessor to the United Steelworkers of America, called an end to a strike that had started on September 22. The Association's governing National Committee announced the decision, which involved 367,000 workers at steel mills and furnaces, after an all day meeting in Pittsburgh. William Z. Foster, the Socialist Party organizer who served as the union's secretary-treasurer, resigned, and in 1923, he would join the Communist Party of America, eventually becoming the Communist nominee in three U.S. presidential elections.
- Six Democratic Party candidates, seeking the nomination to succeed Woodrow Wilson as U.S. president in the 1920 election, spoke at the annual Jackson Day dinner in Washington. One of the front-runners, three-time failed nominee William Jennings Bryan, announced his opposition to the plan by Wilson to have the United States join the League of Nations.
- Born: Gordon Kahl, American anti-federal government protester, leader within the Posse Comitatus group who killed two U.S. Marshals; in Heaton, North Dakota (d. 1983, killed in shootout)
- Died:
  - Josef Josephi, 67, Polish-born singer and actor (b. 1852)
  - Maud Powell, 52, American musician, described as "the world's foremost woman violinist"; died of a heart attack (b. 1867)

== January 9, 1920 (Friday) ==
- With a crew of 42 aboard, the British cargo ship Treveal ran aground in a storm as it was nearing the end of its first voyage. The Treveal was on its way to Dundee in Scotland after having departed Calcutta, but got stranded on the Kimmeridge Ledge off of the English coast near Dorset. For hours, rescue boats were unable to get close to the wrecked ship, and as the Treveal started to break up, its crew climbed into two lifeboats, both of which were swamped by the waves. Only seven crewmembers were able to swim to shore, and the other 35 drowned in the English Channel.
- Born:
  - Chan Canasta, Polish-born entertainer and celebrity magician on BBC; as Chananel Mifelew, in Kraków (d. 1999)
  - Hakeem Mohammed Saeed, Pakistani medical researcher, founded Hamdard Laboratories, served as Governor of Sindh Province; in Delhi, British India (d. assassinated 1998 )

== January 10, 1920 (Saturday) ==
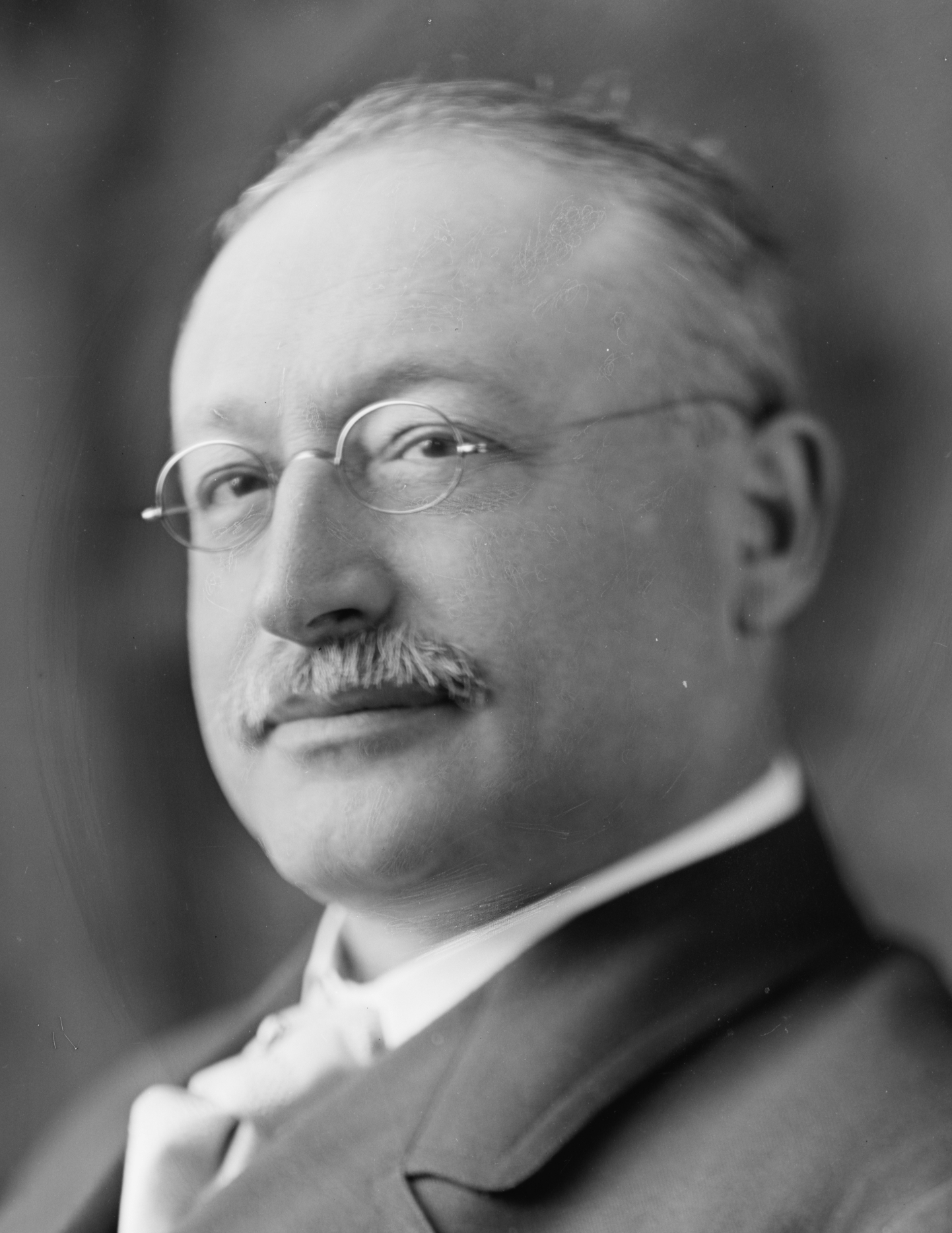
Socialist Congressman-elect Berger

- The Treaty of Versailles went into effect as Germany and 14 of the 17 allied powers exchanged instruments of ratification, bringing a formal end to World War I. The United States, China, Greece and Romania had not ratified the treaty.
- The League of Nations Covenant was entered into force.
- By a vote of 328–6, the U.S. House of Representatives refused to allow Victor Berger, who had been elected in November as a Socialist Party candidate in Wisconsin, to be sworn in to office. The vote was premised on the idea that, as a Socialist, Berger was disloyal to the United States. Berger previously was denied a seat on November 10, by a vote of 311 to 1.
- Setting a National Hockey League record that still stands, the Montreal Canadiens defeated the Toronto St. Patricks (now called the Toronto Maple Leafs), 14 goals to 7. The 21 goals scored that day set an NHL record for most combined goals in a game, and would be tied on December 11, 1985, with the Edmonton Oilers defeat of the Chicago Blackhawks 12 to 9.
- Born: Roberto M. Levingston, president of Argentina from 1970 to 1971; in San Luis (d. 2015)

== January 11, 1920 (Sunday) ==
- The Supreme Council of the League of Nations members voted to give full recognition of the independence of the Azerbaijan Democratic Republic, the Democratic Republic of Armenia and the Democratic Republic of Georgia as separate from the former Russian Empire. Within the next two years, all three of the nations would be invaded and annexed into the Soviet Union.
- The Smithsonian Institution announced in Washington, D.C., that a "multiple charge high efficiency rocket" had been invented by Clark College Professor Robert H. Goddard. Citing Goddard's discovery that the increase of the ratio of propulsion material to the weight of a projectile, coupled with an improved nozzle for the rocket engine, had raised the efficiency of the rocket from two percent to 64%, and that a rocket could be developed to reach a speed of 8,000 feet per second (2,400 m/s). "The great scientific value of Professor Goddard's experiments", the Smithsonian press release stated, "lies in the possibility of sending recording apparatus to moderate and extreme altitudes", noting that the highest altitude of a balloon was 19 miles (31 km), and added that "Weather forecasting... would undoubtedly be improved if daily observations could be taken in the upper levels of the atmosphere" and that a craft could actually reach the Moon.
- France held its first elections for the French Senate since the start of World War I, with 240 seats up for voting.

A Soviet Republic is declared in South Georgia Island by a revolutionary party of whalers.

== January 12, 1920 (Monday) ==
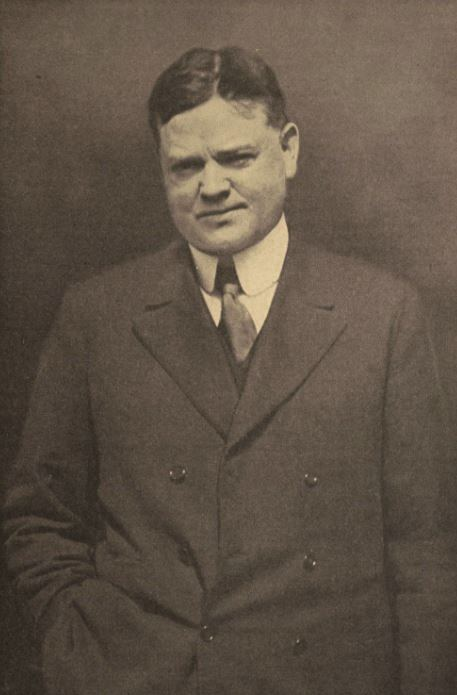
ARA Director Hoover

- The French passenger ship SS Afrique was wrecked on a shoal during a storm in the Bay of Biscay, killing all but 34 of the 609 passengers and crew on board.
- Future U.S. President Herbert Hoover, director of the American Relief Administration for President Woodrow Wilson, announced that the U.S. would provide a 150 million dollar line of credit to European nations to avert famine until the next harvest, with the expectation that the loan would be repaid.
- Born: James Farmer, African American civil rights activist, co-founder and national director of the Congress of Racial Equality (CORE); in Marshall, Texas (d. 1999)

== January 13, 1920 (Tuesday) ==
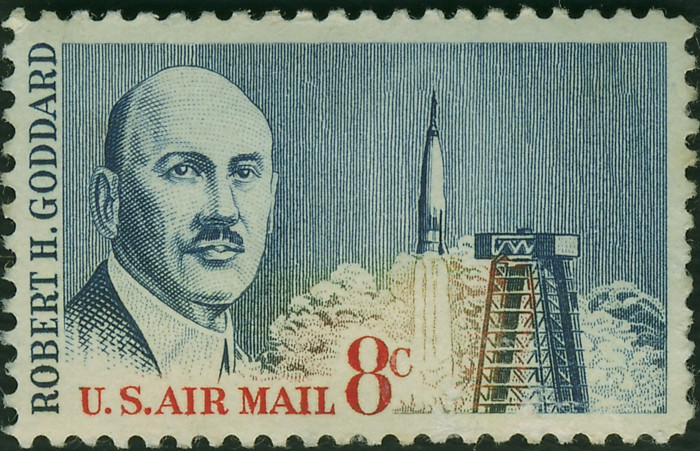
Goddard U.S. stamp

- The New York Times published an editorial ridiculing American rocketry pioneer Robert H. Goddard, referring to Goddard's statement that a rocket fired from Earth could reach the Moon after crossing into the vacuum of space. Observing that "after the rocket quits our air and really starts on its longer journey, its flight would be neither accelerated nor maintained by the explosion of the charges it then might have left. To claim that it would be is to deny a fundamental law of dynamics, and only Dr. Einstein and his chosen dozen, so few and fit, are licensed to do that." The editorial writer added "That Professor Goddard, with his 'chair' in Clark College and the countenancing of the Smithsonian Institution, does not know the relation of action to reaction, and of the need to have something better than a vacuum against which to react— to say that would be absurd. Of course he only seems to lack the knowledge ladled out daily in high schools." The Times would rescind the editorial on July 17, 1969, following the launch of Apollo 11, commenting "[I]t is now definitely established that a rocket can function in a vacuum as in an atmosphere. The Times regrets the error."
- Forty-two demonstrators were killed in Berlin when city police began using bombs and machine guns to disperse the crowd.

== January 14, 1920 (Wednesday) ==
- Frank Munsey, owner of the New York Sun, acquired two other newspaper companies in New York City, the New York Herald and the New York Evening Telegram, both properties of the Bennett family that had owned the Herald for 85 years. Munsey also bought the European edition of James Gordon Bennett Jr.'s flagship paper, the Paris Herald.
- Born: Salvador Flores Rivera, Mexican composer and folk singer; in Mexico City (d. 1987)
- Died:
  - John Francis Dodge, 55, American automobile manufacturer, co-founded the Dodge Brothers Motor Company in 1900; died of Spanish flu (b. 1864)
  - Charles E. Magoon, 58, American lawyer and diplomat, Governor of the Panama Canal Zone from 1905 to 1906, Governor of Cuba from 1906 to 1909 (b. 1861)

== January 15, 1920 (Thursday) ==
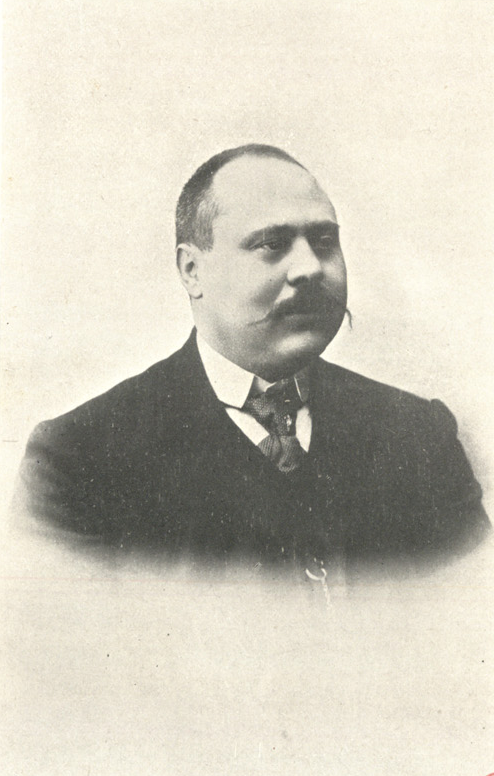
"Five Minute" Prime Minister

- Francisco Fernandes Costa was asked to form a new government for the Kingdom of Portugal after Alfredo de Sá Cardoso resigned as the nation's presidente do Ministerio (president of the cabinet, equivalent to prime minister). Preparing to take office with his coalition of ministers, he was holding his first cabinet meeting when a mob of protesters assembled in the streets. Anticipating violence, Fernandes Costa resigned the same day that he had started the job, an event now called “O Governo dos Cinco Minutos” — "The Five Minute Government." Fernandes Costa returned to form a new ministry the next day, on the condition that he also be appointed to serve as Foreign Minister.
- A group of about 300 anti-government rebels in Haiti, the "Cacos", made a surprise early morning attack on the capital at Port-au-Prince, only to discover that government police and an occupational force of U.S. Marines had been informed of the plot. At least 116 of the cacos, and one of the Marines, were killed in the battle. The tipoff of the impending attack was reportedly given by a U.S. resident, Mr. Elliott, who was the general manager of the Haitian-American Sugar Company refinery on the outskirts of town. Elliott was awake at 2:00 in the morning when he noticed the marching troops and telephoned the U.S. Marine barracks.
- Born: John O'Connor, American Roman Catholic Cardinal, served as Archbishop of New York from 1984 until his death; in Philadelphia (d. 2000)
- Died: Richard Cockburn Maclaurin, 49, Scottish-born American educator and mathematical physicist, 6th President of the Massachusetts Institute of Technology (b. 1870)

== January 16, 1920 (Friday) ==
- Prohibition in the United States began at the end of the day, with the Eighteenth Amendment to the Constitution coming into effect. The amendment had been ratified on January 16, 1919, and provided in Section 1 "After one year from the ratification of this article the manufacture, sale or transportation of intoxicating liquors within, the importation thereof into, or the exportation therefor from the United States and all territory subject to the jurisdiction thereof for beverage purposes is hereby prohibited." The final day of legal alcohol sales saw minimal celebration and, at midnight in each United States time zone, all 177,790 licensed saloons in the U.S. ceased alcohol sales.
- At 10:30 in the morning in the clock room of the French Foreign Ministry, the new League of Nations began operations with the holding of its first Executive Council meeting. With Léon Bourgeois of France presiding, representatives from Belgium, Brazil, France, Greece, Italy, Japan, Spain and the United Kingdom participated in the first session. As New York Times reporter Edwin L. James described it, "The nine men gathered about the table started a work which may influence the lives of untold millions of humans for centuries to come." In addition, the Allied blockade of Russia was partially lifted in order for grain to be exchanged for Russian manufactured products, but recognition was not otherwise accorded to the Soviet government.
- The Allies of World War I served a summons upon the Netherlands Ambassador to France, demanding for the extradition of former German Kaiser Wilhelm II for trial for war crimes. The Kaiser, who was charged with three counts of a treaty violation by invading Belgium, permitting German U-boats to sink civilian ships, and using poison gas in warfare. He had fled after his abdication in 1918.
- U.S. Secretary of State Robert Lansing announced that U.S. troops would be withdrawn from Siberia on February 1.
- Born: Al Morgan, American novelist and TV producer (d. 2011)
- Died: Reginald De Koven, 59, American operatic composer, founder of the Washington Symphony Orchestra (b. 1859)

== January 17, 1920 (Saturday) ==
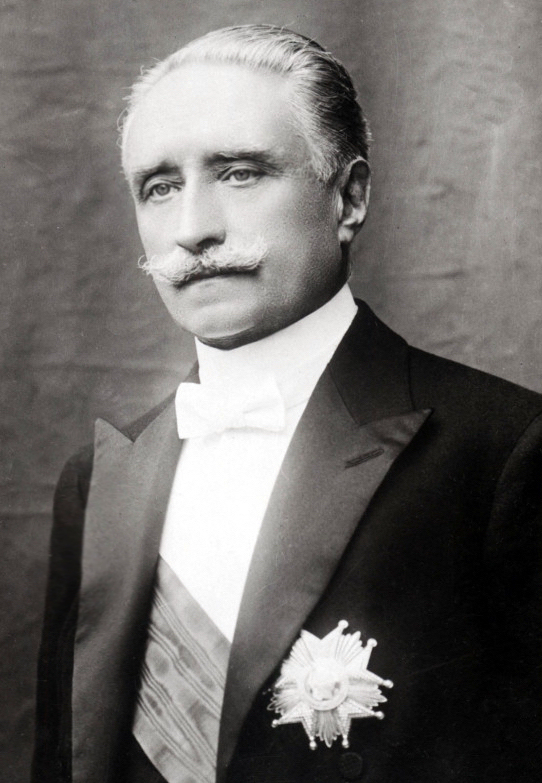
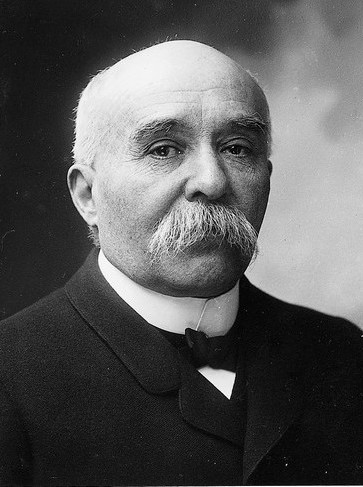
President-elect Deschanel and challenger Clemenceau
- Paul Deschanel was elected as the new President of France, with 734 of 889 members of the National Assembly casting votes in his favor. Only 56 voted for Prime Minister Clemenceau. Deschanel was inaugurated on February 18 for a seven-year term, but would soon be forced to resign because of a deterioration of his sanity.
- At one minute after midnight, any liquor or beer in a public place in the United States, became subject to seizure and destruction by the U.S. government.

== January 18, 1920 (Sunday) ==
- France's Prime Minister Georges Clemenceau resigned, along with his entire cabinet, two days after withdrawing his candidacy for president. President Raymond Poincaré asked Alexandre Millerand to form a new ministry.
- The Morgenthau Report was released to the public, summarizing the findings of the "Mission of the United States to Poland" chaired by diplomat Henry Morgenthau Sr. The report, which had been delivered to President Wilson on October 3, confirmed that mobs in Poland had killed 252 Polish Jews in pogrom since becoming independent in 1918, but found no proof that the Polish government had been involved, or that the number of deaths had been in the thousands.
- Pollyanna, a silent film that marked the start of Mary Pickford's career with United Artists, was released to theaters nationwide.
- Born: Cecil W. Stoughton, American photographer, official White House photographer during the Kennedy and Johnson administrations; in Oskaloosa, Iowa (d. 2008)
- Died: Giovanni Capurro, 60, Italian poet, composed the lyrics to "O sole mio" (b. 1859)

== January 19, 1920 (Monday) ==
- The American Civil Liberties Union (ACLU) was founded.
- Born: Javier Pérez de Cuéllar, Peruvian diplomat, served as the fifth Secretary-General of the United Nations from 1982 to 1991, and later as Prime Minister of Peru from 2000 to 2001; in Lima (d. 2020)

== January 20, 1920 (Tuesday) ==
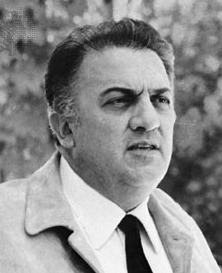
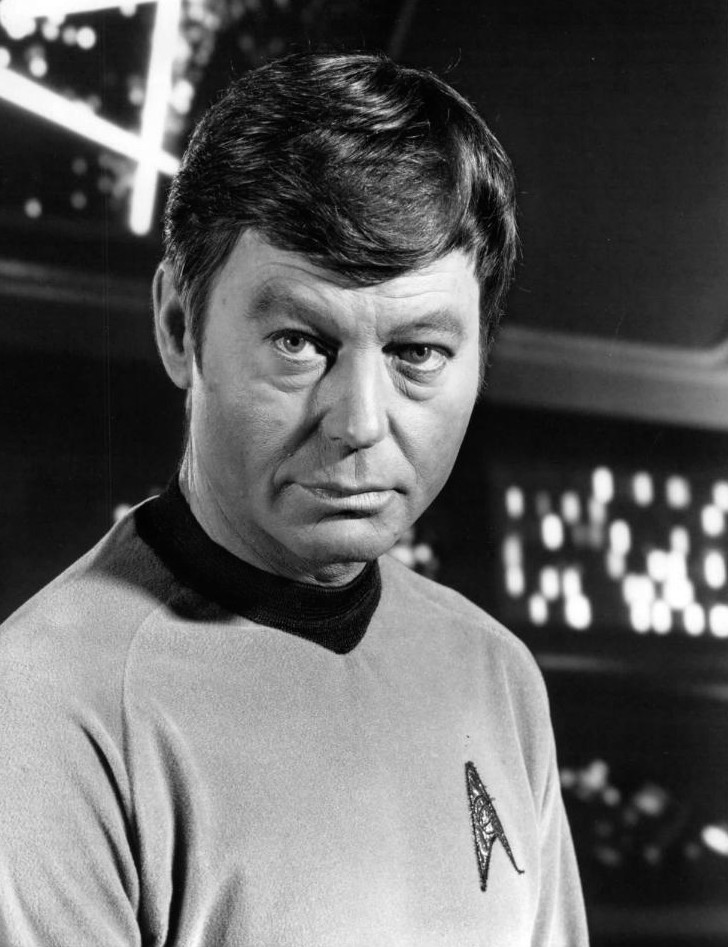
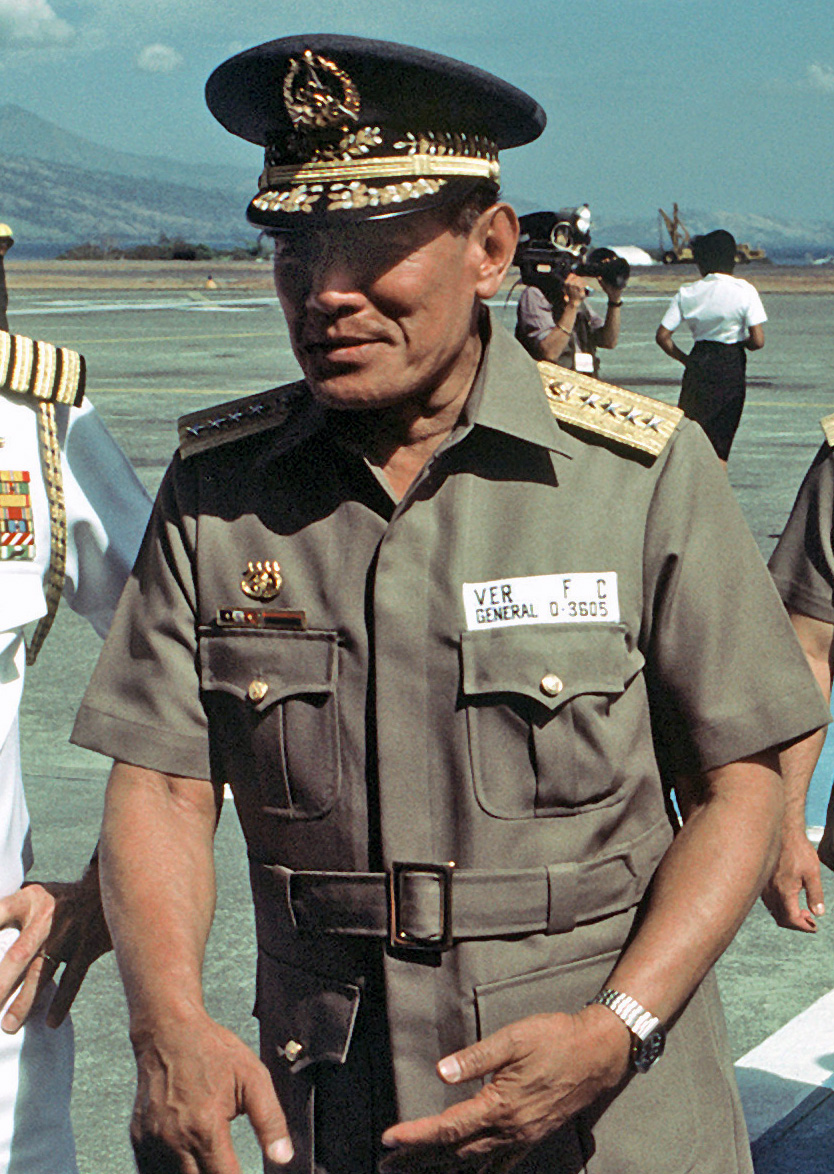
Federico Fellini, DeForest Kelley and Fabian Ver
- Former White Forces commander Alexander Kolchak, defeated by the Bolshevik Army in the Russian Civil War, was surrendered by the White Army authorities at Irkutsk. The Bolsheviks placed him on trial the next day and would execute him on February 7
- The League of Nations Council voted to deliver an ultimatum to Yugoslavia, giving the government four days to comply with the Pact of London by allowing Italy to occupy the Adriatic seaport of Fiume. The pact had been made with Italy in World War I to bring Italy into the side of the Allied Powers in the war against the Central Powers.
- The foundering of the U.S. freighter Macona off of the coast of the Sweden in sight of the Nidingen Lighthouse killed 40 of the 41 crew aboard.

- Born:
  - Federico Fellini, Italian film director, four-time Academy Award winner for Best Foreign Film; in Rimini (d. 1993)
  - DeForest Kelley, American actor, best known as "Dr. McCoy" in the Star Trek television and movie series; as Jackson DeForest Kelley, in Toccoa, Georgia (d. 1999)
  - Fabian Ver, Filipino military officer, Chief of Staff of the Philippines Armed Forces from 1981 to 1986 under President Ferdinand Marcos; in Sarrat, Ilocos Norte province (d. 1998)
- Died: Georg Lurich, 43, Estonian strongman and wrestler who toured the United States; died of typhoid fever (b. 1876)

== January 21, 1920 (Wednesday) ==
- The Battle of Marash began as the Turkish National Forces besieged the former Ottoman Empire city of Maraş in order to reclaim it from the occupying French Army and the French Armenian Legion and French Senegalese troops from Africa. After three weeks, the French Army would flee the city and most of the 20,000 Armenians in Marash would be killed.
- The final session of the Paris Peace Conference was held, even though peace treaties with Hungary and Turkey remain to be concluded. The United States would not conclude its own treaty with Germany until August 25, 1921.
- Mississippi became the first U.S. state to decline to ratify the proposed Nineteenth Amendment to the United States Constitution, providing for the right of American women to vote in all U.S. elections. In the state House of Representatives, only 25 were in favor, while 106 were against ratification. On March 22, 1984, almost 64 years after the Amendment went into effect, Mississippi would become the last state to pass its resolution to ratify.
- Railroad service across Italy was disrupted when the nation's railway workers went on strike. The Italian Army was sent to guard railroad stations, lines and trains, with orders to shoot at anyone attempting to interfere with the passage of the few trains that could be operated. The strike ended one week later after an agreement was reached between the government and labor leaders.
- Mexico granted tentative permits to U.S. oil companies for oil exploration and drilling, to be made permanent after the election of a new president and Mexican Congress in July.
- Born: Errol Barrow, Barbadian statesman, first Prime Minister of Barbados from 1966 to 1976; in Saint Lucy, British Windward Islands (present-day Barbados) (d. 1987)

== January 22, 1920 (Thursday) ==
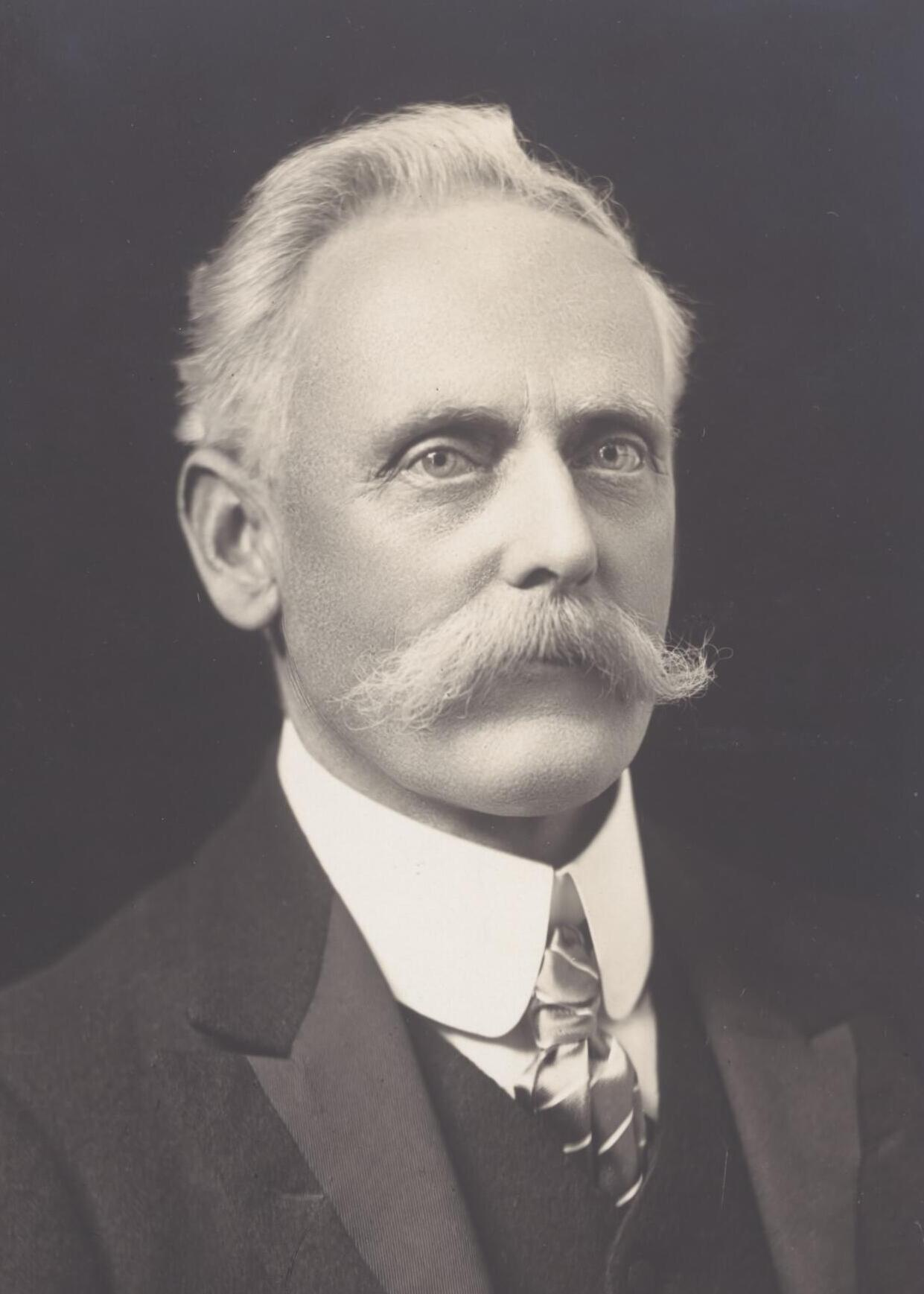
William McWilliams

- The Australian Country Party (ACP) (now called the National Party of Australia) was formed by nine members of Parliament who had supported the policies of the Australian Farmers’ Federal Organisation. William McWilliams, of Tasmania's Country Party organization, as selected as the ACP's first leader.
- On his first day in office as Prime Minister of France, Alexandre Millerand and his government were criticized severely, and he demanded a vote of confidence by the National Assembly. The deputies who did vote registered their approval of the Millerand government, 272 to 23, but another 300 abstained from the possibility of dismissing the new government or from endorsing it
- Born: Alf Ramsey, English football player and manager, coach of the England national football team from 1963 to 1974, winning the 1966 World Cup; in Dagenham, East London (d. 1999)
- Died: Richard Lynch Garner, 71, American primatologist, theorized that chimpanzees had a their own language (b. 1848)

== January 23, 1920 (Friday) ==
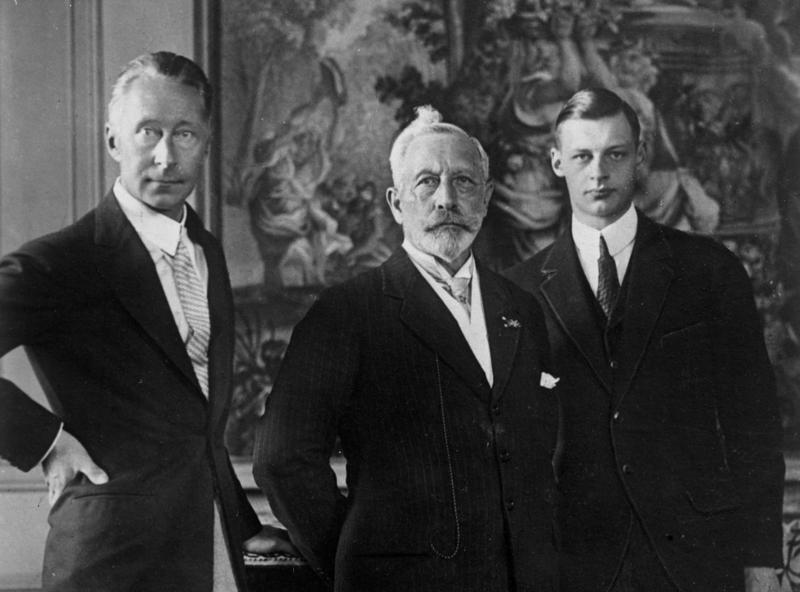
The former Kaiser (center) along with former Crown Prince Wilhelm (left), and grandson, Prince Wilhelm of Prussia (right))

- The Netherlands announced that it would not allow the extradition of the former Kaiser of Germany, Wilhelm II, citing both its tradition of not surrendering political fugitives and the fact that it was not a party to the League of Nations treaty
- The Ukrainian People's Republic signed a treaty with Russia, recognizing the Bolshevik government in return for a withdrawal of their troops, and providing for a resumption of trade between the two nations.
- Construction of the Gibraltar Dam was completed in Santa Barbara County, California, damming the Santa Ynez River and creating the Gibraltar Reservoir that supplies fresh water to the metropolitan area in Southern California.
- Born:
  - Fred Morrison, American inventor and entrepreneur, creator of the Frisbee flying disc; in Richfield, Utah (d. 2010)
  - Gottfried Böhm, German architect and sculptor, winner of the 1986 Pritzker Architecture Prize; in Offenbach am Main, Weimar Republic (d. 2021)

== January 24, 1920 (Saturday) ==
- Germany began the evacuation of their troops from Danzig, Upper Silesia and Schleswig in compliance with the Treaty of Versailles. Control of the German territories was released to a multinational force of League nations.
- Born:
  - Manuel Yan, Filipino general, Chief of Staff of the Philippines Armed Forces from 1968 to 1972, later the Secretary of Foreign Affairs in 1987; in Manila (d. 2008)
  - Jerry Maren, American film and TV actor, last surviving cast member in the 1939 Metro-Goldwyn-Mayer film The Wizard of Oz; as Gerard Marenghi, in Boston (d. 2018)
- Died:
  - Percy French, 65, Irish songwriter and entertainer, best known for his 1877 hit "Abdul Abulbul Amir", died of pneumonia (b. 1854)
  - Amedeo Modigliani, 35, Italian sculptor and painter, died of tuberculosis (b. 1884)
  - Cyrus T. Brady, 58, American priest and popular adventure novelist, died of pneumonia (b. 1861)

== January 25, 1920 (Sunday) ==
- The republic of Germany suggested a compromise with the Allied Powers over demands that the German government surrender 334 citizens for prosecution for crimes committed by them during the First World War. Under the German proposal, the Leipzig War Crimes Trials would take place before a group of seven criminal judges from the former Imperial Court of Justice of Germany. The Allies, who had been unable to persuade Germany to allow its people to be tried by foreign governments, agreed to the German proposal in May and delivered the names of 45 accused German war criminals.

== January 26, 1920 (Monday) ==
- Germany's Reich Minister of Finance, Matthias Erzberger, was wounded in an assassination attempt as he was standing outside the Criminal Courts Building in Berlin. Erzberger was struck in the shoulder, but a second bullet, aimed at his stomach, was deflected by the chain of his pocket watch. Erzberger would be forced to resign two months later in a corruption scandal. Hated by German nationalists for signing the surrender of Germany in 1918, Erzberger was killed in a second assassination attempt on August 26, 1921.
- Died:
  - General Vladimir Kappel, 36, Russian Imperial Army officer, leader of the Menshevik war against the Bolsheviks in Russia; died of typhus contracted during the Great Siberian Ice March (b. 1883)
  - Jeanne Hébuterne, 21, French model, common-law wife of artist Amedeo Modigliani, committed suicide (b. 1898)

== January 27, 1920 (Tuesday) ==
- The Kingdom of Yugoslavia accepted the Allied proposal to create the Free State of Fiume for the region around the city of the same name, occupied by both Italian and Croatian persons who had been citizens of Austria-Hungary. Fiume would exist as an autonomous state until 1924.
- Born:
  - Heinz Kessler, German communist politician and military officer in East Germany, Minister of National Defense from 1985 to 1989; in Lauban, Weimar Republic (present-day Lubań, Poland) (d. 2017)
  - Hiroyoshi Nishizawa, Japanese fighter ace, credited with shooting down at least 36 planes during World War II; in Minamiogawa village, Nagano Prefecture, (d. 1944, shot down by a U.S. pilot)\
  - Helmut Zacharias, German violinist and composer; in Berlin (d. 2002)

== January 28, 1920 (Wednesday) ==
- Construction began on the Cincinnati Subway in Cincinnati, Ohio, as Mayor John Galvin operated a steam shovel to dig the first ground at Walnut Street and the former Miami and Erie Canal. Two miles of tunnels had been excavated by 1923, but the project was abandoned when no additional funding was ever provided.
- King Alfonso XIII of Spain issued a decree establishing the Spanish Legion, similar to the French Foreign Legion, under the name El Tercio de Extranjeros ("The Foreigners’ Regiment”).
- South Carolina's legislature passed a resolution specifically rejecting the proposed 19th Amendment (as opposed to failing to approve a resolution for ratification), with the state Senate voting 30 to 4 to turn it down. The state House of Representatives had voted 97 to 21 in favor of rejection on January 22. On July 1, 1969, almost 49 years after the amendment's effective date, South Carolina would ratify the amendment.

== January 29, 1920 (Thursday) ==
- Peru's National Assembly voted to ask the League of Nations to arbitrate a border dispute over the Tacna and Arica regions claimed by Peru, Chile and Bolivia.
- Three days after the U.S. steamship S.S. Mielero had to evacuate when the ship foundered in a storm off of the coast of Florida, one of the two lifeboats, carrying 21 people (18 crew and the captain's wife, daughter and son) disappeared after becoming separated from the other lifeboat. The 18 people on the surviving boat, all crew of the Mielero, were rescued.
- The same day, the U.S. steamer SS Fortune sank off of Jekyl Island the U.S. state of Georgia with all 13 of its crew.
- Born:Balantrapu Rajanikanta Rao, Indian writer of Telugu language literature and song lyrics; in Nidadavolu, Madras State, British India (present-day Andhra Pradesh state of India) (d. 2018)
- Died: Charles H. Duell, 69, U.S. Patent Office Commissioner, misquoted as saying that "Everything that can be invented has been invented." (b. 1850)

== January 30, 1920 (Friday) ==
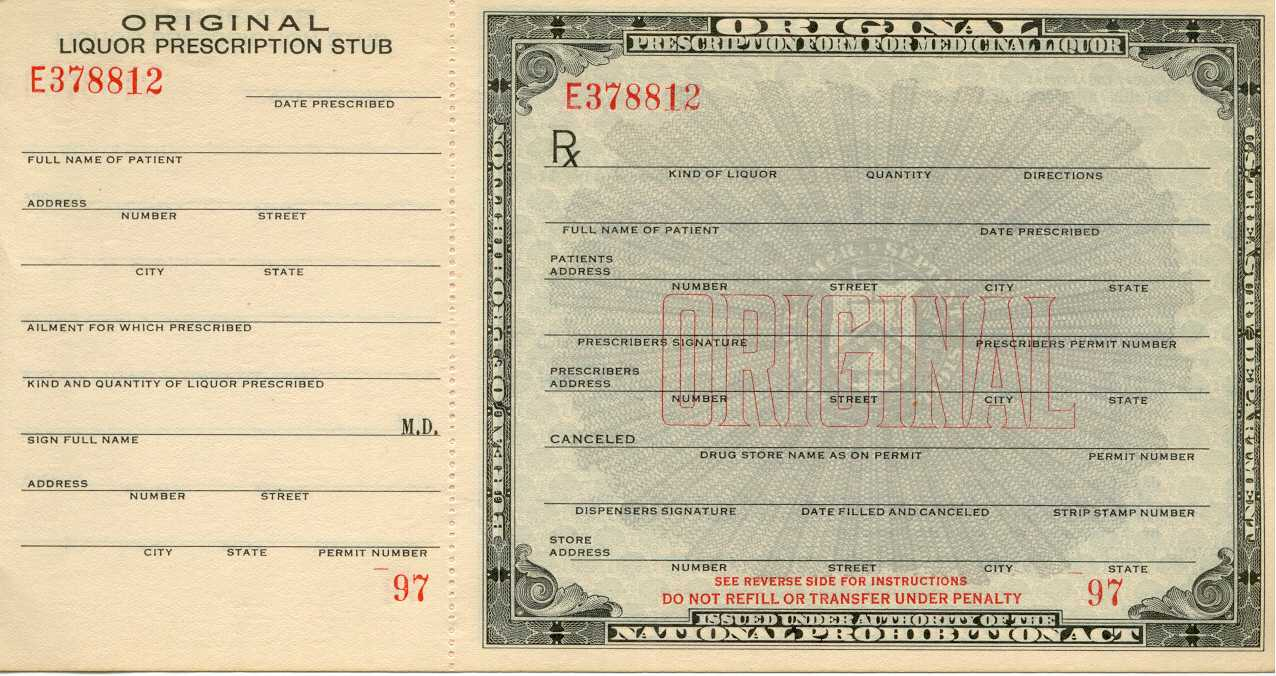
Whiskey available by prescription only

- The U.S. Bureau of Internal Revenue issued regulations governing the medicinal use of alcohol, the lone exception to Prohibition. Under the rule, prescriptions by physicians were limited to no more than one pint of liquor or wine at a time, and no refills earlier than 10 days.
- In Lushnjë in the Principality of Albania, the delegates to the Congress of Lushnjë voted to fire the existing government. Turhan Përmeti, the Ottoman Empire Pasha who had governed Albania after the breakup of the Empire in 1918, was removed from office along with his cabinet, and Paris Peace Conference representative Sulejman Delvina was installed in his place.
- Born:
  - Ben Bagdikian, Armenian-American journalist, political commentator and critic; as Ben-Hur Haig Bagdikian, in Marash, Ottoman Empire (present-day Turkey) (d. 2016)
  - Delbert Mann, American TV and film directory, won the Academy Award for Best Director for the film Marty in 1955; in Lawrence, Kansas (d. 2007)
  - Michael Anderson, English film director, known for Around the World in 80 Days and Logan's Run; in London (d. 2018)

== January 31, 1920 (Saturday) ==
- The British Army and the Royal Irish Constabulary arrested seven members of the Dublin City Council who had been elected to office as candidates of the Sinn Féin political party, which advocated Ireland's independence from the United Kingdom of Great Britain and Ireland. The move came a day after the Irish Republic flags had been placed on the municipal building while the council was in session. In all, 25 Sinn Féin members were arrested on warrants in the counties of Dublin, Clare, Limerick, and Tipperary and were charged with violating the Defence of the Realm Act 1914.

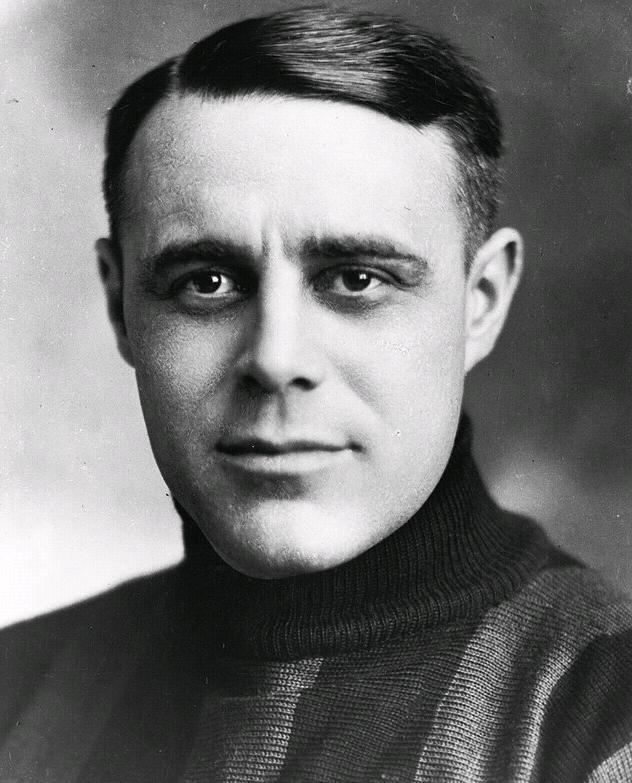
Joe Malone

- Joe Malone of the Quebec Bulldogs set a National Hockey League record (that has never been equaled or surpassed) by scoring seven goals in a 10 to 6 win over the Toronto Saint Patricks (now the Maple Leafs).
- Born: James Lee, American martial arts pioneer and teacher, specialist in the Iron Palm system of training; in Oakland, California (d. 1972 from lung cancer)
