= United Kingdom Postal Clerks' Association =

Former trade union of the United Kingdom

The United Kingdom Postal Clerks' Association was a trade union representing post office workers in the UK.

== History ==
The union was founded in 1887 by postal sorters working outside London. Those in London had already attempted and failed to form a lasting union, and soon afterwards succeeded in forming the Fawcett Association, which remained a rival to the UKPCA. The UKPCA also began recruiting post office counter clerks and writers.

The union was initially based in Liverpool, and never developed strength outside North West England. From 1895, it was instead run from Manchester.

In 1901, the union affiliated to the Trades Union Congress. In 1906, the union's executive proposed affiliation to the Labour Party, but members heavily rejected the idea, and the union instead adopted a position of being non-political.

The union discussed a potential merger with the Fawcett Society in 1907, but members were apathetic, and this did not proceed. Despite this, the union continued to grow, employing Lucy Withrington as its women's officer from 1908, and reaching 7,724 members by 1912.

In 1911, the union instead began discussing a potential merger with the Postal Telegraph Clerks' Association. This was achieved in 1914, with the new union becoming known as the Postal and Telegraph Clerks' Association.

== General Secretaries ==
1887: George Lascelles
1893: Paul Casey
1895: George Landsberry
1901: Ernest Lea
1911: Albert Varley
