= Wallace Bligh Cheesman =

British trade union leader and political activist

Wallace Bligh Cheesman (1865–1947) was a British trade union leader and political activist.

Born in the Gad's Hill area of Higham, Kent, Cheesman began working for the Post Office. In 1890, he was a founder member of the Fawcett Association, a trade union for post office workers, and he served as its general secretary from 1891. The following year, he was sacked from the Post Office on the grounds that he had circulated information about candidates in the 1892 general election. He supported the Labour Representation Committee, attending its founding conference, and he served on its National Executive Committee in 1902/03.

While secretary of the Fawcett Association, Cheesman also served for many years as the honorary secretary of the United Government Workers' Federation, and as editor of its journal, the Government Workers' Advocate. He remained secretary of the Fawcett Association until the end of 1919, when he took it into a merger which formed the Union of Post Office Workers. He served as the first assistant secretary of the new union, but retired in the mid-1920s, when he reached the age limit set for officials of the new union. He then became secretary of the small Royal Parks Employees' Union.

Trade union offices
| Preceded by New position | General Secretary of the Fawcett Association; 1891–1919 | Succeeded by Position abolished |
| Preceded by New position | Assistant Secretary of the Union of Post Office Workers; 1920–c.1925 | Succeeded by T. J. Hodgson |
