= Edith Howse =

British trade unionist and politician

Edith H. Howse (19 December 1883 – 1955) was a British trade unionist and politician.

Born in Chorlton-upon-Medlock, near Manchester, Howse began working for the General Post Office in 1900 as a "telephone learner". She joined the Postal Telegraph Clerks' Association, and in 1909 became a part-time union official. In 1916, she became the first full-time women's organiser of the union.

In 1920, the union became part of the new Union of Post Office Workers, with Howse continuing as women's organiser, and also becoming an assistant secretary of the union, with responsibility for the telephones and telecommunications section. In this role, she attended numerous national and international conferences, often speaking on women's trade unionism.

Howse retired in 1937, but remained active, becoming a Labour Party member of Wembley council, and serving a term as Mayor of Wembley.

Trade union offices
Preceded by New position	Women's Organiser of the Postal and Telegraph Clerks' Association; 1916–1919	Succeeded by Position abolished
Preceded by New position	Women's Organiser of the Union of Post Office Workers; 1920–1937	Succeeded by M. Peake
Civic offices
Preceded by Frank Crook	Mayor of Wembley; 1946–1947	Succeeded by Harold Sirkett
