= Horace Nobbs =

Horace Nobbs (9 December 1880 – 1973) was a British trade unionist and political activist.

Born in Norwich, Nobbs joined the Post Office and became active in the Postal and Telegraph Clerks' Association (PTCA), working for it full-time in Manchester from 1911. He also became a supporter of syndicalism, and in 1914 he persuaded the union to back his motion, which called for the Post Office to come under workers' control. In 1918, he became the union's national organising secretary, then in 1919 briefly served as its treasurer.

Nobbs was active in the Labour Party, for which he stood in Heywood and Radcliffe at the 1918 United Kingdom general election, with the sponsorship of the union; he took 32.4% of the vote and second place. He was expected to stand in the 1921 Heywood and Radcliffe by-election, but withdrew on the instruction of the union, and the election was won by his replacement, Walter Halls.

In 1919, Nobbs became part of the Union of Post Office Workers, becoming its national organising secretary. In this role, he was responsible for membership, the co-ordination of the district organisers, and for members' education. He was also active in the Workers' Educational Association.
