= SS Mielero =

Steam tank ship built in 1916–1917

Coordinates: 31°44′54.02″N 78°40′04.52″W

History

United States
- Name: Mielero
- Owner: Cuba Distilling Co.
- Builder: Fore River Shipbuilding Co., Quincy
- Yard number: 252
- Laid down: 15 April 1916
- Launched: 23 January 1917
- Sponsored by: Mrs. Frances F. Reubens
- Commissioned: 14 February 1917
- Maiden voyage: 17 February 1917
- Home port: New York
- Identification: US Official Number 214740; Call sign LGRN
- Fate: Foundered, 26 January 1920

General characteristics
- Type: Tanker
- Tonnage: 5,853 GRT; 3,670 NRT; 8,120 DWT
- Length: 389 ft 0 in (118.57 m)
- Beam: 54 ft 7 in (16.64 m)
- Depth: 29 ft 3 in (8.92 m)
- Installed power: 2,200 ihp
- Propulsion: General Electric steam turbine, double reduction geared to one screw
- Speed: 10 1/2 knots (12.1 mph; 19.4 km/h)

Mielero was a steam tank ship built in 1916–1917 by Fore River Shipbuilding Company of Quincy for the Cuba Distilling Company of New York. The vessel was extensively employed on East Coast to Cuba route during her career and foundered during one of her regular trips on January 26, 1920, with the loss of 22 men.

== Design and construction ==
Cuba Distilling Company of New York was founded in 1907 to process and utilize molasses, the main by-product of sugar refining which was left unused until then. The company intended to transport blackstrap molasses to the United States where it would be used to produce cattle feed, vinegar and technical alcohol. Early in 1915 in light of their rapidly increasing business, Cuba Distilling decided to enlarge their fleet operating between their sugar plantations in the West Indies and the ports on the East Coast of the United States and an order was placed with Fore River Shipbuilding Corporation for three steam tankers of approximately 8,000 tons deadweight.

Mielero was the third vessel on that order and was laid down on 15 April 1916 at the builder's shipyard and launched on 23 January 1917 (yard number 252), with Mrs. Frances F. Reubens, wife of Horatio S. Reubens, general manager of Cuba Distilling Co., being the sponsor.

The ship had two main decks with a top gallant forecastle, long poop deck and short bridge and had her machinery located aft. The tanker was built on the transverse system, had her hold subdivided into eleven oiltight, two watertight and two non-watertight bulkheads and also had nine cargo tanks. The vessel was designed by the shipyard's naval architects to accommodate the owners requirements for the ship being able to carry both petroleum and molasses in bulk. Because of the difference in density between molasses and oil, different set of tanks were to be used depending on the type of cargo being carried. The total capacity of the main and double bottom tanks was 2,342,500 and 382,000 gallons, respectively. The pump room was located amidships and contained both main cargo pump, and an auxiliary ballast pump that could have been used to handle oil cargo independently of the main pump. The tanker was also equipped with wireless apparatus located in the bridge house, had submarine signal system installed and had electrical lights installed along the decks.

As built, the ship was 389 feet 0 inches (118.57 m) long (between perpendiculars) and 54 feet 7 inches (16.64 m) abeam, a depth of 29 feet 3 inches (8.92 m). Mielero was originally assessed at 5,853 GRT and 3,670 NRT and had deadweight of approximately 8,120. The vessel had a steel hull with double bottom throughout, and a single 2,200 ihp steam turbine, double-reduction geared to a single screw propeller that moved the ship at up to 10 1/2 knots (12.1 mph; 19.4 km/h). The steam for the engine was supplied by three single-ended Scotch marine boilers fitted for both coal and oil fuel.

== Operational history ==
Following delivery, Mielero was immediately pressed into service and left the shipyard on 17 February 1917 for New York. There she loaded a cargo of petroleum and sailed out for Cuba on February 19. She arrived at Baltimore on March 2 loaded with a cargo of 1,650,000 gallons of molasses, thus successfully concluding her maiden voyage. Upon unloading, Mielero immediately sailed out for Cuba again on March 4 and after taking on board a full cargo of molasses at Matanzas and Puerto Padre on March 11 and 13, returned to Baltimore on March 17 making a round trip journey in just eleven days.

Mielero continued serving the same general route for the remainder of her career. On her trips south she was travelling most of the times in ballast and occasionally was transporting small quantities of petroleum products, while on her way up north the ship carried full loads of molasses loaded at various ports of Cuba, such as Matanzas, Puerto Padre, Cienfuegos and Antilla. For the remainder of 1917 and most of 1918 the tanker was largely employed on the route between Cuba and Baltimore but commencing in 1919 she started to transport her cargo to other ports on the US Atlantic Seaboard and Gulf Coast, such as Boston, Philadelphia, New York, New Orleans and Port Eads. For example, she delivered full cargo of molasses to Philadelphia 22 June 1919 and again on October 4 of the same year.

=== Sinking ===
Mielero departed Baltimore for her last trip on 14 January 1920 bound for Nuevitas. The ship was under command of captain Harold G. Simmons and had a crew of 36. In addition, the captain's wife and their 6-year-old son and 3-year-old daughter were on board the tanker. After reaching Cuba and loading her usual cargo of approximately 1,600,000 gallons of molasses, Mielero departed Matanzas on January 23 bound for Philadelphia. While off Florida and Georgia coast the ship ran into a strong gale. In the early morning of January 26 Mielero suddenly developed a list forcing the captain to order the crew to abandon ship. Both lifeboats were lowered and an entire crew and captain's family disembarked the vessel at approximately 05:30 local time. Shortly after the tanker was abandoned, she suddenly parted amidships breaking into two and rapidly sinking. One lifeboat was under command of chief engineer and had 17 other crew members, while the second one was commanded by the captain and had his family and 18 crew men in it. The boats stayed together the first day before being separated by the storm. They again were able to reunite the next day but a very strong gale arriving later on that day separated the lifeboats for good. During the night of January 29–30 the lifeboat containing the chief officer was spotted by the Shipping Board steamer Ozette on her way to Bremen approximately 150 nautical miles (280 km) east of Savannah. All 18 people aboard the lifeboat were rescued and subsequently transferred to Mielero's sister ship SS Sucrosa who safely landed them in Baltimore on February 3. On hearing the news of the rescue, Rear-Admiral Anderson of the Sixth Naval District dispatched minesweeping tug Swallow and destroyer Belknap to look for the second lifeboat. After searching the area for three days and failing to find any trace of the other lifeboat, both vessels returned to Charleston on February 2.
