= Zeuthen–Segre invariant =

In algebraic geometry, the Zeuthen–Segre invariant I is an invariant of a projective surface found in a complex projective space which was introduced by Zeuthen (1871) and rediscovered by Corrado Segre (1896).

The invariant I is defined to be d – 4g – b if the surface has a pencil of curves, non-singular of genus g except for d curves with 1 ordinary node, and with b base points where the curves are non-singular and transverse.

Alexander (1914) showed that the Zeuthen–Segre invariant I is χ–4, where χ is the topological Euler–Poincaré characteristic introduced by Poincaré (1895), which is equal to the Chern number c_{2} of the surface.
