= Postal and Telegraph Clerks' Association =

Former trade union of the United Kingdom

- Formation: 1881
- Dissolved: 1919
- Type: Trade union
- Location: United Kingdom

The Postal and Telegraph Clerks' Association (PTCA) was a trade union in the United Kingdom for workers in the post office and telecommunications industries.

== History ==
The union was founded in 1881 as the Postal Telegraph Clerks' Association, amalgamated with the United Kingdom Postal Clerks' Association in 1914 to form the Postal and Telegraph Clerks' Association, and in 1919 amalgamated with the Postmen's Federation and the Fawcett Association to form the Union of Post Office Workers. It achieved official recognition, and as a result, in 1920 the London Postal Porters' Association, Central London Postmen's Association, Tracers' Association, Tube Staff Association, Messengers' Association and Sorters' Association all merged with it.

== Leadership ==
Notable figures in the leadership of the union included the women's officer, Edith Howse.

=== General Secretaries ===
1881: T. Wilkinson
1881: T. Morris
1886: J. E. Scott
1890: T. D. Venables
1898: C. E. Hall
1903: Thomas McKinney
1906: William Johnson
1910: E. R. Tuck
1914: J. G. Newlove
1917: Albert Lynes (acting)
1917: Frederick Fox Riley (acting)

Lynes was elected as general secretary in 1919, but before he could take up the post, the union was merged.

=== Organising Secretaries ===
1914: Fred Richardson
1918: Horace Nobbs
