= Hieronymus Georg Zeuthen =

Danish mathematician (1839–1920)

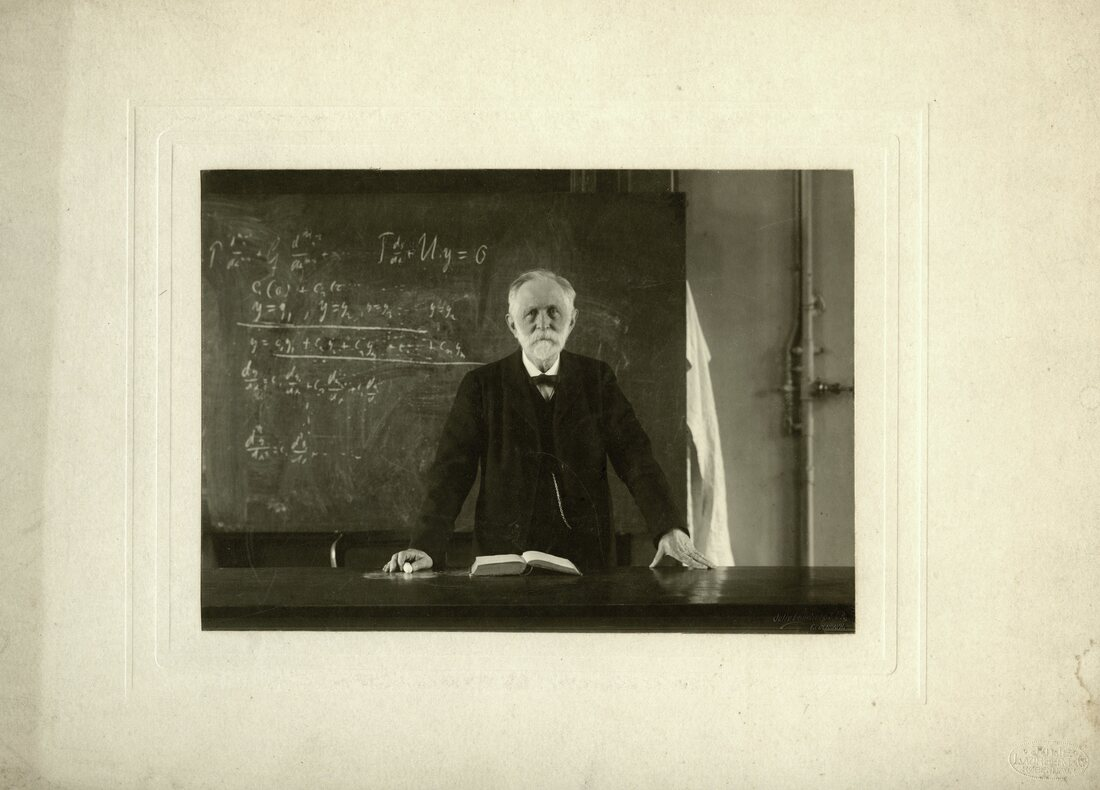
- Hieronymus Georg Zeuthen photographed by Julie Laurberg & Co.
- Born: 15 February 1839; Grimstrup, Denmark
- Died: 6 January 1920 (aged 80); Copenhagen, Denmark
- Known for: Enumerative geometry, History of mathematics
- Scientific career
- Fields: Mathematician

Hieronymus Georg Zeuthen (15 February 1839 – 6 January 1920) was a Danish mathematician. He is known for work on the enumerative geometry of conic sections, algebraic surfaces, and history of mathematics.

== Early life and education ==
Zeuthen was born in Grimstrup near Varde where his father was a minister. In 1849, his father moved to a church in Sorø where Zeuthen began his secondary schooling. In 1857 he entered the University of Copenhagen to study mathematics and graduated with a master's degree in 1862. Following this he earned a scholarship to study abroad, and decided to visit Paris where he studied geometry with Michel Chasles.

== Career ==
After returning to Copenhagen, Zeuthen submitted his doctoral dissertation on a new method to determine the characteristics of conic systems in 1865. Enumerative geometry remained his focus up until 1875.

In 1871, he was appointed as an extraordinary professor at the University of Copenhagen, as well as becoming an editor of Matematisk Tidsskrift, a position he held for 18 years. For 39 years he served as secretary of the Royal Danish Academy of Sciences and Letters, during which he also lectured at the Polytechnic Institute. In 1886, he was promoted to ordinary professor at the University of Copenhagen, where he twice served as rector.

After 1875, Zeuthen began to make contributions in other areas such as mechanics and algebraic geometry, as well as being recognised as an expert on the history of medieval and Greek mathematics. He wrote 40 papers and books on the history of mathematics, which covered many topics and several periods. He was an invited speaker at the International Congress of Mathematicians in 1897 at Zurich, in 1904 at Heidelberg, and in 1908 at Rome.

== See also ==
- Zeuthen–Segre invariant
- Ingeborg Hammer-Jensen, notable student and historian of science

== Publications ==
- Abriß einer elementar-geometrischen Kegelschnittlehre. Teubner 1882.
- Die Lehre von den Kegelschnitten im Altertum. Kopenhagen 1886 (Danish version 1885 in Forh.Vid.Selskab).
- Geschichte der Mathematik im Altertum und Mittelalter. Kopenhagen 1896 (Danish version 1893 publ. by Verlag A.F.Hoest).
- Histoire des Mathématiques dans l'Antiquité et le Moyen Age. Paris, Gauthier-Villars, 1902.
- Geschichte der Mathematik im XVI. und XVII. Jahrhundert. Teubner 1903, and as Heft 17 of Abhandlungen zur Geschichte der mathematischen Wissenschaften (ed. Moritz Cantor). The Danish version was published 1903 in Copenhagen.
- Die Mathematik im Altertum und im Mittelalter. Kopenhagen 1912.
- Lehrbuch der abzählenden Methoden der Geometrie. Teubner 1914.
- Hvorledes Mathematiken i tiden fra Platon til Euklid blev rationel Videnskab. Avec un résumé en francais. Forh.Dansk Vid.Selskab 1917, pp. 199–369.
