= Fawcett Association =

London trade union for post office

- Merged into: Union of Post Office Workers
- Founded: 1890
- Dissolved: 1919
- Headquarters: 55 Doughty Street, London
- Location: England
- Members: 3,750 (1904)
- Key people: Wallace Bligh Cheesman (Gen Sec)
- Affiliations: TUC

The Fawcett Association was a trade union representing postal clerks in London.

== History ==
The union was founded in 1890. It was named after Henry Fawcett, who it considered had been sympathetic to workers when he was Postmaster General.

For most of its existence, the union's general secretary was Wallace Bligh Cheesman, and its chairman was William E. Clery. They were sacked from the Post Office after they circulated information about candidates in the 1892 general election, and attempted to get them to express support for the union. However, Cheesman remained the union's secretary throughout its existence.

Cheesman decided to work closely with other unions, and in 1893, the Fawcett Association became the first clerical union to affiliate to the Trades Union Congress. It also joined the United Government Workers' Federation, and formed the National Joint Committee of Postal and Telegraph Associations in 1897, with the Postmen's Federation, Postal and Telegraph Clerks' Association and United Kingdom Postal Clerks' Association.

The union was represented at the founding meeting of the Labour Representation Committee (LRC). Clery was adopted as an LRC candidate in 1901, but was also adopted as a Liberal-Labour candidate for Deptford. This proved controversial, and he did not ultimately stand under either label.

Membership of the union grew steadily, reaching 3,750 by 1904. The Postal Bagmen's Association and the Women Sorters' Association affiliated to the Fawcett Association in 1906. In 1919, it merged with the Postmen's Federation and the Postal and Telegraph Clerks' Association, forming the Union of Post Office Workers.

== Election results ==
The union co-sponsored a Labour Party candidate at the 1918 UK general election:

Constituency	Candidate	Votes	Percentage	Position
Camberwell North	Charles Ammon	2,175	21.0	3

== Leadership ==
=== General Secretaries ===
1889: L. Leader
1890: William E. Clery
1890: H. Hall
1890: William E. Clery
1891: J. Guest
1892: Wallace Bligh Cheesman

=== Chairs ===
1889: J. H. Williams
1893: William E. Clery
1903: G. W. Gains
1905: A. J. Mosedale
1908: E. J. Nevill
1911: Charles Ammon

=== Treasurer ===
1889: H. Groves
1899: W. E. Smith
1902: J. Fitzgerald
1917: C. P. Randall
