= 1920 =

1920 in various calendars
- Gregorian calendar: 1920; MCMXX
- Ab urbe condita: 2673
- Armenian calendar: 1369; ԹՎ ՌՅԿԹ
- Assyrian calendar: 6670
- Baháʼí calendar: 76–77
- Balinese saka calendar: 1841–1842
- Bengali calendar: 1326–1327
- Berber calendar: 2870
- British Regnal year: 10 Geo. 5 – 11 Geo. 5
- Buddhist calendar: 2464
- Burmese calendar: 1282
- Byzantine calendar: 7428–7429
- Chinese calendar: 己未年 (Earth Goat); 4617 or 4410 — to — 庚申年 (Metal Monkey); 4618 or 4411
- Coptic calendar: 1636–1637
- Discordian calendar: 3086
- Ethiopian calendar: 1912–1913
- Hebrew calendar: 5680–5681
- Hindu calendars
- Vikram Samvat: 1976–1977
- Shaka Samvat: 1841–1842
- Kali Yuga: 5020–5021
- Holocene calendar: 11920
- Igbo calendar: 920–921
- Iranian calendar: 1298–1299
- Islamic calendar: 1338–1339
- Japanese calendar: Taishō 9 (大正９年)
- Javanese calendar: 1850–1851
- Juche calendar: 9
- Julian calendar: Gregorian minus 13 days
- Korean calendar: 4253
- Minguo calendar: ROC 9 民國9年
- Nanakshahi calendar: 452
- Thai solar calendar: 2462–2463
- Tibetan calendar: ས་མོ་ལུག་ལོ་ (female Earth-Sheep); 2046 or 1665 or 893 — to — ལྕགས་ཕོ་སྤྲེ་ལོ་ (male Iron-Monkey); 2047 or 1666 or 894

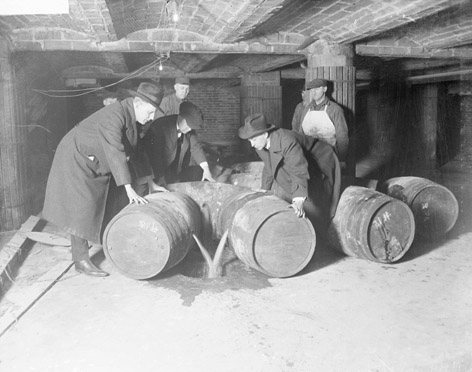
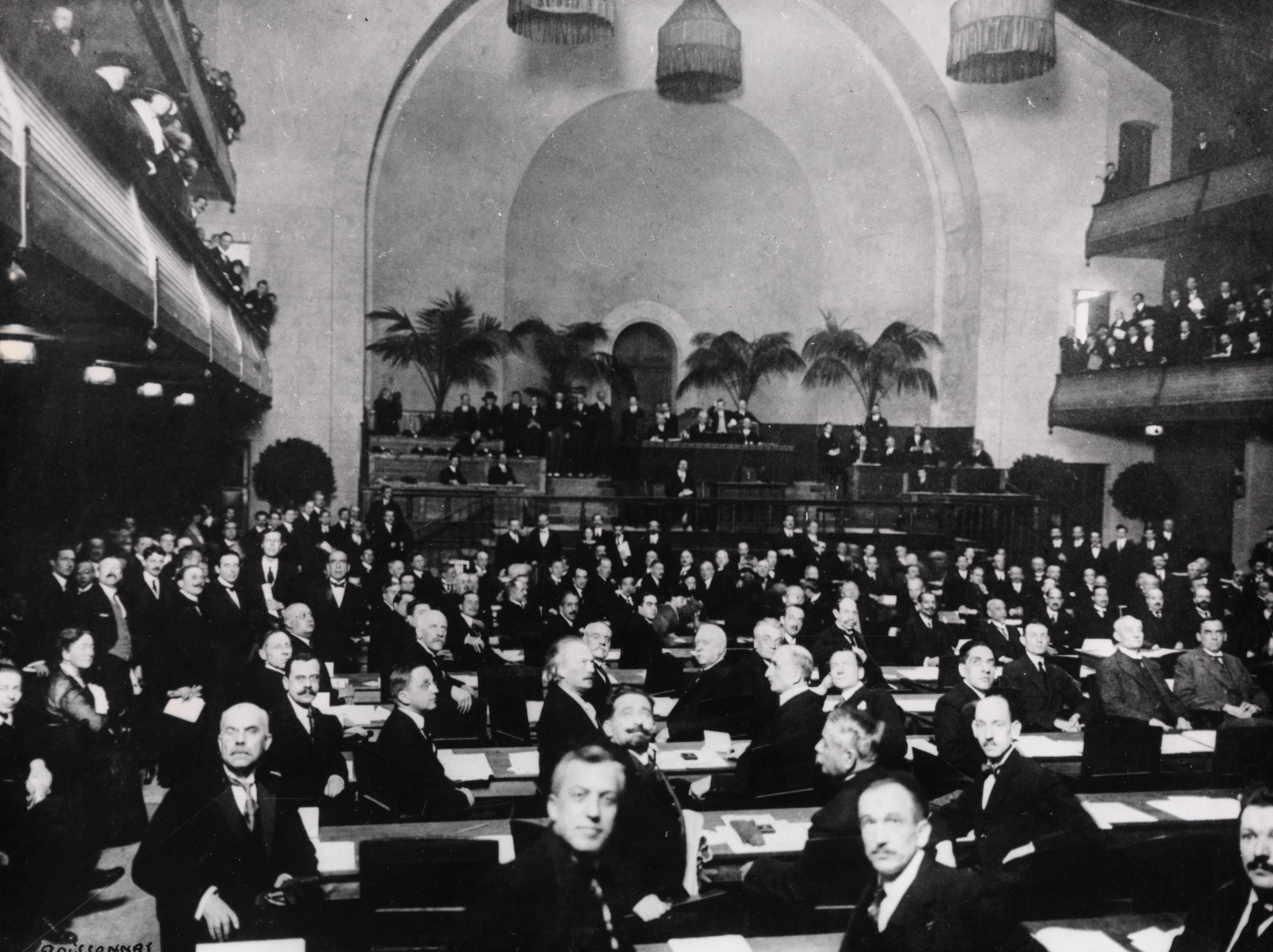
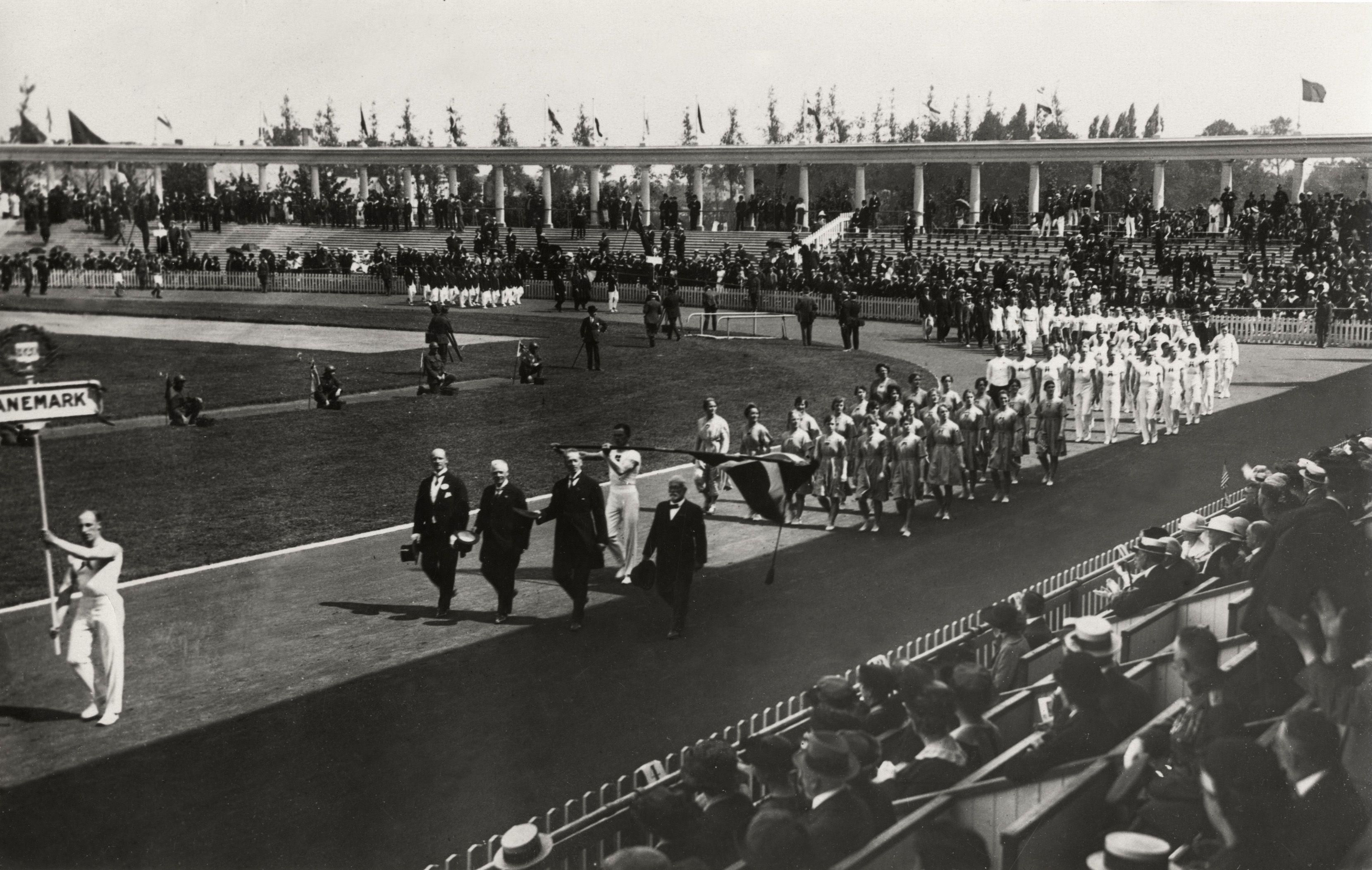
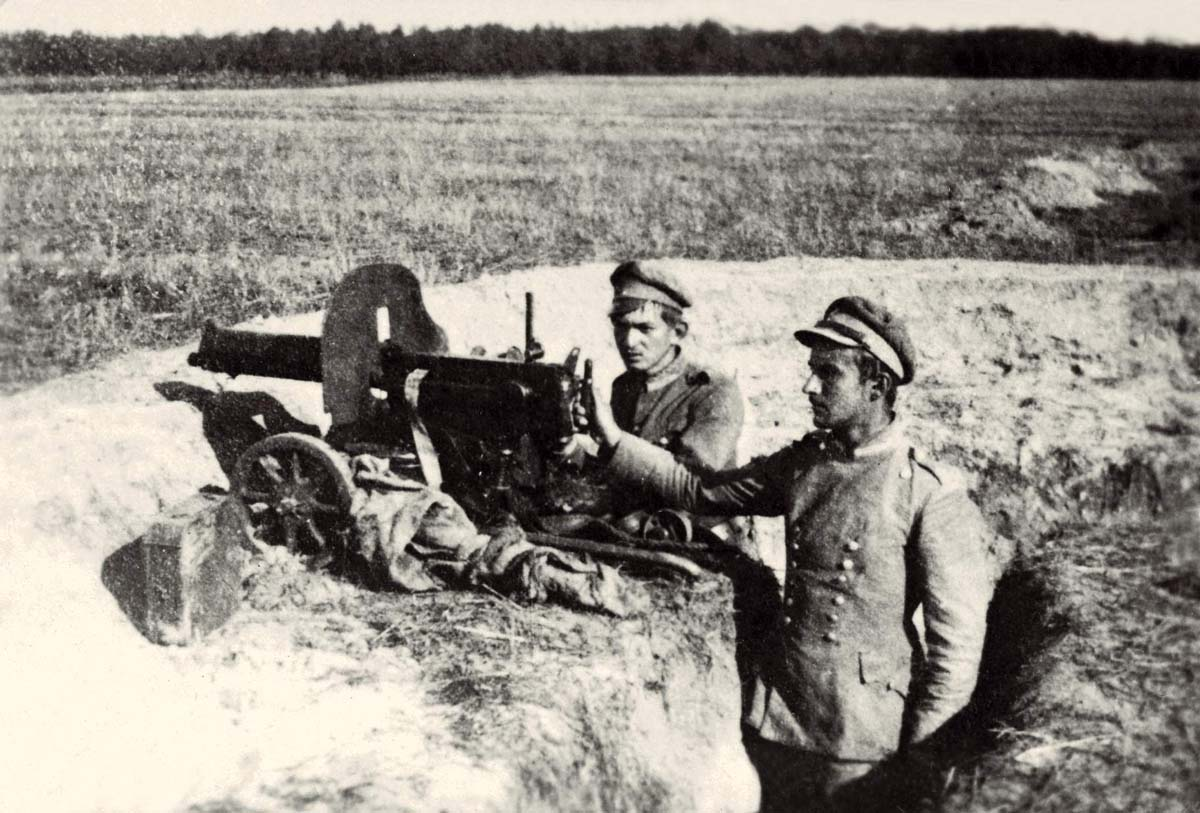
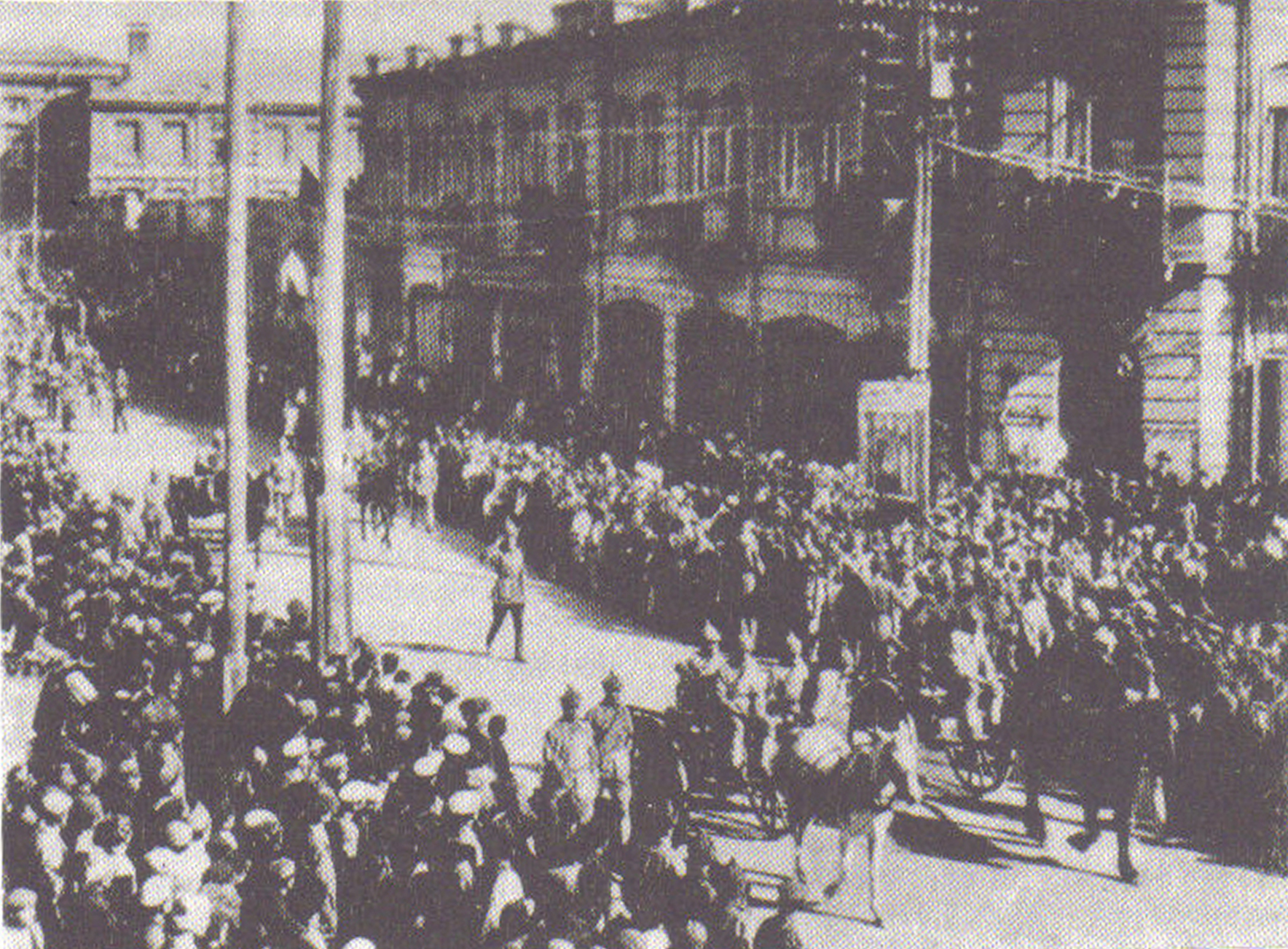
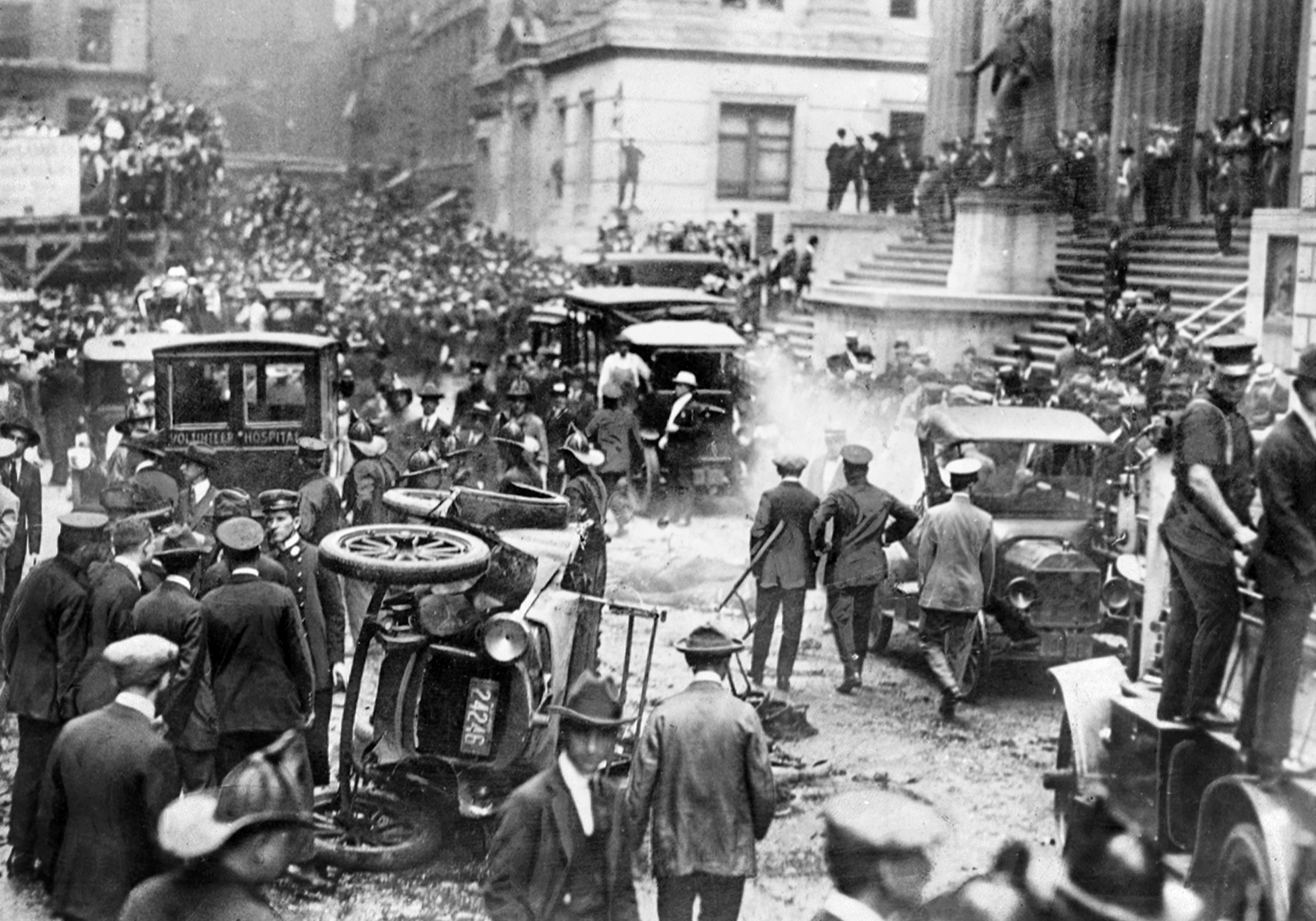
From top to bottom, left to right:
- The Prohibition era begins as the Eighteenth Amendment and Volstead Act ban alcohol across the United States, sparking speakeasies and organized crime;
- The League of Nations is established in Geneva, Switzerland to maintain global peace;
- The 1920 Summer Olympics are held in Antwerp, Belgium, introducing the Olympic flag and athlete's oath;
- The Battle of Warsaw turns the Polish–Soviet War in Poland's favor, repelling the Red Army;
- The Red Army invasion of Armenia and Red Army invasion of Azerbaijan bring both nations into the Soviet Union;
- The Wall Street bombing kills 38 and injures hundreds in New York City's financial district.

1920 (MCMXX) was a leap year starting on Thursday of the Gregorian calendar and a leap year starting on Wednesday of the Julian calendar, the 1920th year of the Common Era (CE) and Anno Domini (AD) designations, the 920th year of the 2nd millennium, the 20th year of the 20th century, and the 1st year of the 1920s decade. As of the start of 1920, the Gregorian calendar was 13 days ahead of the Julian calendar, which remained in localized use until 1923.

== Events ==
=== January ===
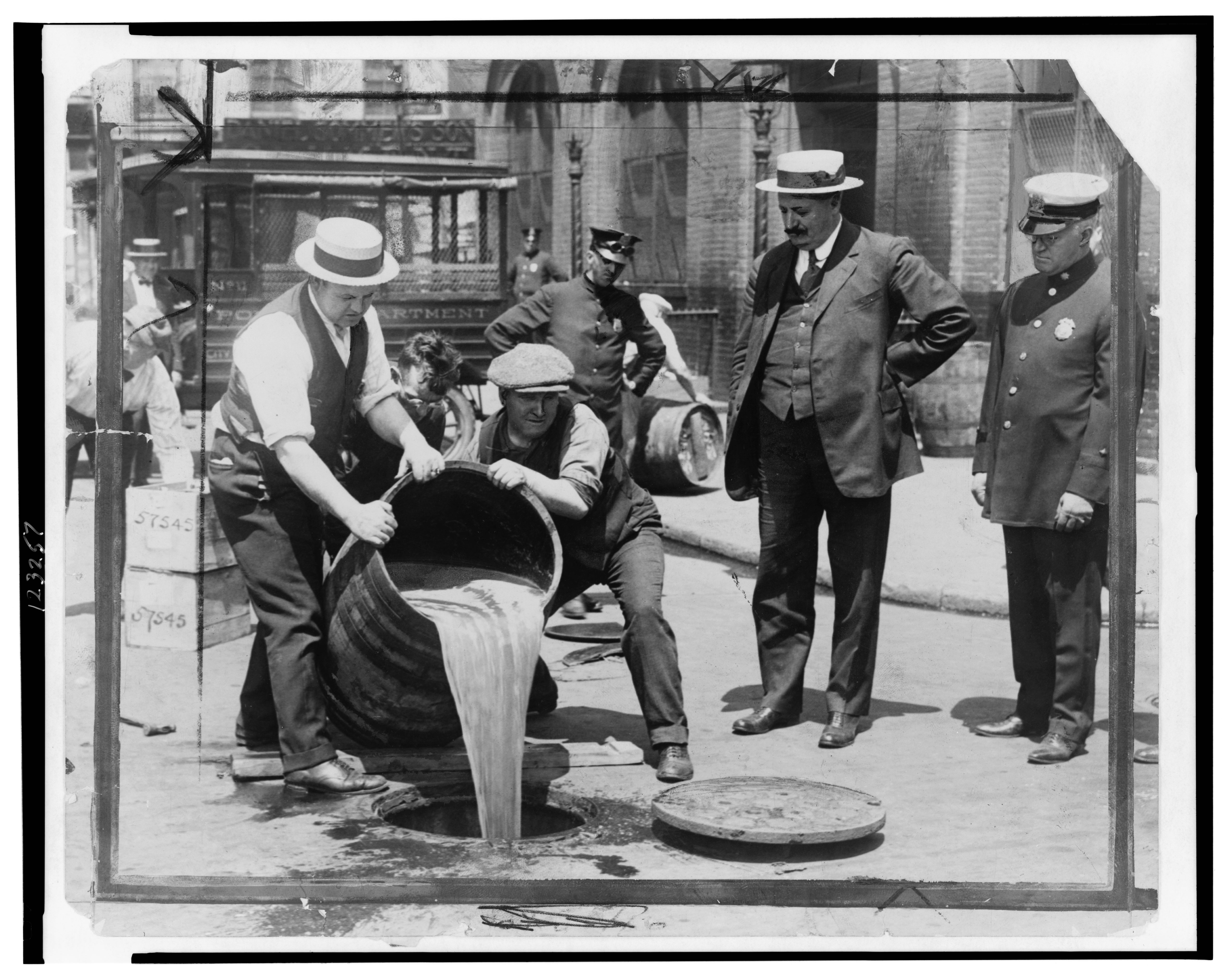
January 17: Beginning of Prohibition in the United States

- January 1
  - Polish–Soviet War: The Russian Red Army increases its troops along the Polish border from 4 divisions to 20.
  - Kauniainen in Finland, completely surrounded by the city of Espoo, secedes from Espoo as its own market town.
- January 7 – Russian Civil War: The forces of Russian White Admiral Alexander Kolchak surrender in Krasnoyarsk; the Great Siberian Ice March ensues.
- January 10
  - The Treaty of Versailles takes effect, officially ending World War I.
  - The League of Nations Covenant enters into force. On January 16, the organization holds its first council meeting, in Paris.
- January 11 – The Azerbaijan Democratic Republic is recognised de facto by European powers in Versailles.
- January 13 – The New York Times ridicules American rocket scientist Robert H. Goddard, which it will rescind following the launch of Apollo 11 in 1969.
- January 16
  - The Allies of World War I demand that the Netherlands extradite ex-German Emperor Wilhelm II who fled there in 1918.
  - Zeta Phi Beta sorority, is founded on the campus of Howard University in Washington, D.C.
- January 17 – Prohibition in the United States begins, with the Eighteenth Amendment to the Constitution which bans the sale of alcohol in all states.
- January 19 – The American Civil Liberties Union (ACLU) is founded.
- January 21 – The final session of the Paris Peace Conference is held, even though peace treaties with Hungary and Turkey remain to be concluded. The United States does not conclude its own treaty with Germany until August 25, 1921.
- January 22 – The Australian Country Party is officially formed.
- January 23 – The Netherlands refuses to extradite ex-German Emperor Wilhelm II; on May 15 he moves into Huis Doorn in the country where he remains permanently in exile until his death in 1941.
- January 28 – El Tercio de Extranjeros (the "Regiment of Foreigners"), later the Spanish Legion, is established by decree of King Alfonso XIII of Spain.

=== February ===
- February 1 – The South African Air Force (SAAF) is established, the second autonomous Air Force in the world, after the British Royal Air Force (RAF).
- February 2
  - Estonian War of Independence: The Tartu Peace Treaty is signed, ending the war and recognizing the independence of both the Republic of Estonia and the Russian Socialist Federative Soviet Republic.
  - France occupies the Memel Territory of East Prussia.
  - Sayyid Muhammad, Khan of Khiva, abdicates.
- February 9 – The Svalbard Treaty, signed by members of the League of Nations in Paris, recognises the sovereignty of Norway over the Arctic archipelago of Svalbard (at this time called Spitzbergen), while giving the other signatories economic rights in the islands.
- February 10 – General Józef Haller first performs Poland's Wedding to the Sea, a symbolic celebration of the restitution of Polish access to the Baltic Sea.
- February 12–24 – Conference of London: Leaders of the United Kingdom, France and Italy meet to discuss the partitioning of the Ottoman Empire.
- February 13 – Switzerland joins the League of Nations.
- February 14 – The League of Women Voters is founded in Chicago.
- February 17 – A woman named Anna Anderson tries to commit suicide in Berlin and is taken to a mental hospital where she claims she is Grand Duchess Anastasia of Russia.
- February 20 – 1920 Gori earthquake: An earthquake hits Gori in the Democratic Republic of Georgia, killing 114.
- February 21 – The island province of Marinduque in the Philippines archipelago is founded.
- February 22 – In Emeryville, California, the first dog racing track to employ an imitation rabbit opens.
- February 24 – Adolf Hitler presents his National Socialist Program in Munich to the German Workers' Party (Deutsche Arbeiterpartei), which renames itself as the Nazi Party (Nationalsozialistische Deutsche Arbeiterpartei).

=== March ===
- March 1
  - Hungarian admiral and statesman Miklós Horthy becomes the Regent of Hungary.
  - The United States Railroad Administration returns control of American railroads to its constituent railroad companies.
- March 7 – The Syrian National Congress proclaims Syria independent, with Faisal I of Iraq as king.
- March 10 – The world's first peaceful establishment of a social democratic government takes place in Sweden as Hjalmar Branting takes over as prime minister when Nils Edén leaves office.
- March 13–17 – Wolfgang Kapp and Walther von Lüttwitz's Kapp Putsch (an attempted coup in Germany) briefly ousts the Weimar Republic government from Berlin, but fails due to public resistance and a general strike.
- March 15 – The Ruhr Red Army, a communist army 50,000 men strong, is formed in Germany.
- March 15–16 – Constantinople is occupied by British Empire forces, acting for the Allied Powers against the Turkish National Movement. Retrospectively, the Grand National Assembly of Turkey regards this as the dissolution of the Ottoman regime in Istanbul.
- March 18 – Greece begins using the Gregorian calendar.
- March 19 – The United States Senate refuses to ratify the Treaty of Versailles.
- March 23 – Admiral Miklós Horthy declares that Hungary is a monarchy, without anyone on the throne.
- March 25 – Irish War of Independence: British recruits to the Royal Irish Constabulary begin to arrive in Ireland. They become known from their improvised uniforms as the "Black and Tans".
- March 26
  - The German government asks France for permission to use its own troops against the rebellious Ruhr Red Army, in the French-occupied area.
  - American fiction writer F. Scott Fitzgerald makes his name with publication of This Side of Paradise.
- March 28 – The 1920 Palm Sunday tornado outbreak hits the Great Lakes region and Deep South of the United States.
- March 29 – Sir William Robertson is promoted to Field Marshal, the first man to rise from private (enlisted 1877) to the highest rank in the British Army.

=== April ===
- April 2 – The German army marches to the Ruhr to fight the Ruhr Red Army.
- April 3 – Failed assassination attempts on General Mannerheim, retired leader of the victorious White Guard in the Finnish Civil War, led by Aleksander Weckman by order of Eino Rahja, during a White Guard parade in Tampere, Finland.
- April 4 – 1920 Palestine riots: Violence erupts between Arab and Jewish residents in Jerusalem; 9 are killed, 216 injured.
- April 6 – The short-lived Far Eastern Republic is declared in eastern Siberia.
- April 11 – Mexican Revolution: Álvaro Obregón flees from Mexico City (during a trial intended to ruin his reputation) to Guerrero, where he joins Fortunato Maycotte.
- April 19–26 – San Remo conference: Representatives of Italy, France, the United Kingdom, and Japan meet to determine the League of Nations mandates for administration of territories, following the partitioning of the Ottoman Empire.
- April 19 – Germany and Soviet Russia agree to the exchange of prisoners of war.
- April 20 – Mexican Revolution: Álvaro Obregón announces (in Chilpancingo) that he intends to fight against the rule of Venustiano Carranza.
- April 23 – The Grand National Assembly of Turkey is founded by Mustafa Kemal Atatürk, in Ankara. It denounces the government of Sultan Mehmed VI and announces a temporary constitution.
- April 24 – Polish–Soviet War: Polish and anti-Soviet Ukrainian troops attack the Red Army in Soviet Ukraine.
- April 26 – The Khorezm People's Soviet Republic is officially created by Soviet Russia, as the successor to the Khanate of Khiva.
- April 28 – The Azerbaijan Soviet Socialist Republic is officially created.

=== May ===
- May 3 – A Bolshevik coup fails in the Democratic Republic of Georgia.
- May 7
  - Polish–Soviet War: Polish troops occupy Kyiv. The government of the Ukrainian People's Republic returns to the city.
  - Mexican Revolution: Venustiano Carranza leaves Mexico City in a large train.
  - Treaty of Moscow (1920): Soviet Russia recognizes the independence of the Democratic Republic of Georgia, only to invade the country six months later.
- May 10 – Agnès Souret is elected "The most beautiful woman in France", retrospectively considered the first Miss France.
- May 15 – Russian Revolution: Russian White soldier Maria Bochkareva is executed in Soviet Russia.
- May 16
  - Canonization of Joan of Arc: Over 30,000 people attend the ceremony in Rome, including 140 descendants of Joan of Arc's family. Pope Benedict XV presides over the rite, for which the interior of St. Peter's Basilica in Rome is richly decorated.
  - A referendum in Switzerland favors joining the League of Nations.
- May 17
  - French and Belgian troops leave the cities they have occupied in Germany.
  - The first flight of Dutch air company KLM, from Amsterdam to London, takes place.
- May 19 – Mexican Revolution: Álvaro Obregón's troops enter Mexico City.
- May 20 – Mexican Revolution: Venustiano Carranza arrives in San Antonio Tlaxcalantongo; troops of Rodolfo Herrero attack him at night and shoot him.
- May 24 – Venustiano Carranza is buried in Mexico City; all of his mourning allies are arrested. Adolfo de la Huerta is elected provisional president.
- May 26 – Ganja revolt: Anti-Soviet opposition in the Azerbaijan SSR launches an abortive revolt in Ganja.
- May 27 – Tomáš Garrigue Masaryk becomes president of Czechoslovakia.
- May 29 – Floods at Louth, Lincolnshire in England kill 23.

=== June ===
- June 4 – Treaty of Trianon: Peace is restored between the Allied Powers and Hungary, which loses 72% of its territory.
- June 5 – Bolshevik cavalry breaks through Polish and Ukrainian lines south of Kyiv, precipitating eventual withdrawal.
- June 12 – Polish–Soviet War: The Red Army retakes Kyiv.
- June 13
  - Essad Pasha Toptani, nominal ruler of Albania, is assassinated by Avni Rustemi in Paris.
  - The United States Post Office Department rules that children may not be sent via parcel post.
- June 15
  - A new border treaty between Germany and Denmark gives northern Schleswig to Denmark.
  - The Estonian Constituent Assembly adopts the first constitution of Estonia, which will come into effect on December 21 this year.
  - Duluth lynchings: Three African American circus workers are sprung from jail, subjected to a kangaroo court and hanged by a white mob in Duluth, Minnesota, in the northern United States.
  - Australian soprano Nellie Melba becomes history's first well-known performer to make a radio broadcast when she sings two arias as part of an experimental series of broadcasts from a studio at the Marconi Company's factory at Chelmsford in England.
- June 22 – Greek Summer Offensive: Greece attacks Turkish troops.
- June 28 – Sigma Tau Gamma is founded on campus at the University of Central Missouri in Warrensburg, Missouri
- June 29 – The Republic of China joins the League of Nations.

=== July ===
- July 1 – Germany declares its neutrality in the Polish–Soviet War.
- July 2 – Polish–Soviet War: The Red Army continues its offensive into Poland.
- July 7 – Arthur Meighen becomes Canada's ninth prime minister.
- July 11 – The East Prussian plebiscite determines that most of the territory in question will remain German.
- July 12 – Soviet–Lithuanian Peace Treaty: The Russian Soviet Federative Socialist Republic recognizes independent Lithuania.
- July 19–August 7 – The Second Congress of the Communist International takes place in Saint Petersburg and Moscow; the Twenty-one Conditions are adopted.
- July 20 – The United Kingdom cedes its brief control of the key Black Sea port of Batum to the Democratic Republic of Georgia.
- July 21
  - The Interallied Mission to Poland takes place.
  - The Troubles in Ulster (1920–1922) begin with 8,000 Catholic and Socialist workers driven from shipyards and industrial sites in Belfast.
- July 22 – Polish–Soviet War: Poland sues for peace with Soviet Russia (which refuses).
- July 24 – Battle of Maysalun: The French defeat the Syrian army, whose leader Yusuf al-'Azma is killed. French troops occupy Damascus and depose Faisal I of Syria as king.
- July 26 – Mexican Revolution: Pancho Villa takes over Sabina and contacts Mexican president de la Huerta to offer his conditional surrender, which he signs on July 28.
- July 29 – The United States Bureau of Reclamation begins construction of the Link River Dam, as part of the Klamath Reclamation Project.
- July 30–August 8 – The 1st World Scout Jamboree is held at Olympia, London.
- July 31
  - Irish-born Australian Catholic Archbishop Daniel Mannix is detained on board ship by British authorities off Queenstown and prevented from landing in Ireland or from speaking in the main Irish Catholic communities elsewhere in the United Kingdom.
  - France prohibits the sale or prescription of contraceptives.
  - Representatives of British revolutionary socialist groups meet at the Cannon Street Hotel in London and agree to form the Communist Party of Great Britain.

=== August ===
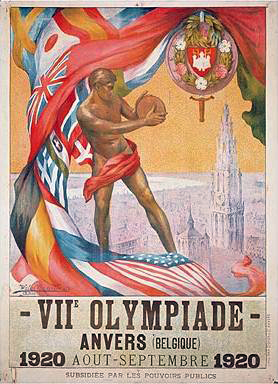
1920 Summer Olympics

- August 3 – Irish War of Independence: Catholics riot in Belfast, in protest at the continuing British Army presence.
- August 10 – Ottoman Sultan Mehmed VI's representatives sign the Treaty of Sèvres with the Allied Powers, confirming arrangements for the partitioning of the Ottoman Empire.
- August 11 – Bolshevik Russia recognizes independent Latvia.
- August 13–25 – Polish–Soviet War: Battle of Warsaw – The Red Army is defeated.
- August 13 – Irish War of Independence: The Restoration of Order in Ireland Act (passed by the Parliament of the United Kingdom) receives Royal Assent, providing for Irish Republican Army activists to be tried by court-martial, rather than by jury in criminal courts.
- August 14–September 12 – Main events of the 1920 Summer Olympics in Antwerp, Belgium (there have been ceremonies and outlying events since April). The Olympic symbols of five interlocking rings and the associated flag are first displayed at the games.
- August 19–25 – Second Silesian Uprising: The Poles in Upper Silesia rise up against the Germans.
- August 19 – Russian Civil War: Peasants in Tambov Governorate begin the Tambov Rebellion against the Bolshevik government of Soviet Russia.
- August 20 – The first commercial radio station in the United States, 8MK (WWJ), begins operations in Detroit. It is owned by the Detroit News, the first U.S. radio station owned by a newspaper.
- August 22 – The Salzburg Festival in Austria is inaugurated as a regular event.
- August 26 – The Nineteenth Amendment to the United States Constitution is ratified, guaranteeing women's suffrage.
- August 28–September 2 – Bukhara operation: The Russian Red Army and Young Bukharians overthrow the Emirate of Bukhara, leading to the establishment of the Bukharan People's Soviet Republic.

=== September ===
- September 5
  - Mahatma Gandhi launches the non-cooperation movement in India, with the goal of obtaining independence from British rule
  - Presidential elections begin in Mexico.
- September 8 – Gabriele D'Annunzio proclaims the Italian Regency of Carnaro in the city of Fiume.
- September 9 – The Lotta Svärd women's paramilitary auxiliary is founded in Finland.
- September 12 – The position of Patriarch of the Serbs is re-established as the authority over the Serbian Orthodox Church, almost 156 years to the day after it was abolished by the Ottoman Empire in 1766.
- September 16
  - Wall Street bombing: A bomb in a horse wagon (perhaps planted by Galleanisti) explodes in front of the J. P. Morgan Building in New York City, killing 38 and injuring 400.
  - The Latvian Land Reform of 1920 is adopted by the Constitutional Assembly of Latvia.
- September 17 – The National Football League is established, as the American Professional Football Association.
- September 20 – The first soldier joins El Tercio de Extranjeros (the "Regiment of Foreigners", later the Spanish Legion). Under the command of José Millán Astray and Francisco Franco, its first duties are against Rif rebels in the Spanish protectorate in Morocco.
- September 21 – The Communist Party of Uruguay is founded.
- September 22 – The London Metropolitan Police forms the Flying Squad, a motorised mobile detective patrol unit.
- September 25 – The Treaty of Seeb is signed, ending the Muscat rebellion and granting the Imamate of Oman autonomy from the Sultanate of Muscat and Oman.
- September 27 – Polish–Soviet War: Soviet Russia sues for peace with Poland.
- September 29
  - The first domestic radio sets come to stores in the United States; a Westinghouse radio costs $10.
  - Adolf Hitler makes his first public appearance in Austria, with speeches in Vienna, Innsbruck and Salzburg.

=== October ===
- October – English writer Agatha Christie's first novel, The Mysterious Affair at Styles, appears in the U.S., introducing her long-running Belgian detective character Hercule Poirot in the setting of an English country house. (The book is published in the U.K. in 1921.)
- October 3 – The Prix de l'Arc de Triomphe horse race first runs in Paris.
- October 4 – The Mannerheim League for Child Welfare, a Finnish non-governmental organization, is founded on the initiative of Sophie Mannerheim.
- October 9 – Polish–Lithuanian War: Polish troops take Vilnius.
- October 10 – Carinthian Plebiscite: A large part of Carinthia Province votes to become part of Austria, rather than Yugoslavia.
- October 14 – A peace treaty between the Soviet and the Finnish governments is concluded at Tartu.
- October 16 – Polish–Soviet War: After the Polish army captures Tarnopol, Dubno, Minsk and Dryssa, the ceasefire is enforced.
- October 18 – Thousands of unemployed demonstrate in London; 50 are injured.
- October 26 – Álvaro Obregón is announced as the elected president of Mexico.
- October 27
  - The League of Nations moves its headquarters to Geneva, Switzerland.
  - Baron Louis De Geer the Younger becomes the new prime minister of Sweden.
- October 30 – The Communist Party of Australia is founded in Sydney.
- October 31 – Dr. Frederick Banting of Ontario first records his insight on how to isolate insulin for the treatment of diabetes; the first successful human trial of insulin will occur 15 months later.

=== November ===
- November 2
  - 1920 United States presidential election: Republican U.S. senator Warren G. Harding defeats Democratic governor of Ohio James M. Cox and Socialist Eugene V. Debs, in the first national U.S. election in which women have the right to vote.
  - In the United States, KDKA AM of Pittsburgh (owned by Westinghouse) starts broadcasting as a commercial radio station. The first broadcast is the results of the presidential election.
  - Meiji Shrine, one of many landmark spots in Tokyo, is officially built in Japan.
- November 11 – In London, The Cenotaph is unveiled and The Unknown Warrior is buried in Westminster Abbey; while in Paris the Tomb of the Unknown Soldier is consecrated beneath the Arc de Triomphe.
- November 12 – Italy and the Kingdom of Serbs, Croats and Slovenes sign the Treaty of Rapallo, determining national borders.
- November 13 – The White Army's last units and civilian refugees are evacuated from the Crimea onboard 126 ships, "Wrangel's fleet" (the remnants of the Imperial Russian Navy's Black Sea Fleet), to Turkey, Tunisia and the Kingdom of Serbs, Croats and Slovenes, accompanied by wide-scale civilian massacres. The total number of evacuees amounts to approximately 150,000 people, of which 20% are civilians.
- November 14 – The Edmonton Symphony Orchestra holds its first concert, in Alberta.
- November 15 – In Geneva, the first assembly of the League of Nations is held.
- November 16 – Queensland and Northern Territory Aviation Services (Qantas) is founded by Hudson Fysh and Paul McGinness.
- November 17 – The council of the League of Nations accepts the constitution for the Free City of Danzig.
- November 20 – Prince Arthur of Connaught is appointed the 3rd Governor-General of South Africa.
- November 21 – Irish War of Independence: Bloody Sunday – The Irish Republican Army (IRA), on the instructions of Michael Collins, shoot dead the "Cairo gang", 14 British undercover agents in Dublin, most in their homes. Later this day in retaliation, the Auxiliary Division of the Royal Irish Constabulary open fire on a crowd at a Gaelic Athletic Association football match in Croke Park, resulting in 14 deaths with 60 wounded. Three men are shot this night in Dublin Castle "while trying to escape".
- November 28
  - Irish War of Independence: Kilmichael Ambush – The flying column of the 3rd Cork Brigade of the Irish Republican Army, led by Tom Barry, ambushes two lorries carrying men of the Auxiliary Division of the Royal Irish Constabulary at Kilmichael, County Cork, killing 17 (with 3 of its own men also dying), which leads to official reprisals.
  - FIDAC (French: Fédération Interalliée des Anciens Combattants, English: The Interallied Federation of War Veterans Organisations) is established in Paris at the initiative of veterans from World War I, predominantly pacifists, joined by associations of veterans from France, the United Kingdom, United States, Belgium, Romania, Czechoslovakia, Italy and Serbia.

=== December ===
- December
  - The so-called Spanish flu pandemic ends with an estimated total of between seventeen and fifty million dead since 1918. It would be the last global pandemic until the 2009 swine flu pandemic almost 90 years later.
  - The first edition of the Poems of the English war poet Wilfred Owen, killed in action in 1918, appears in London, introduced by his friend Siegfried Sassoon. Only five of Owen's verses having been published in his lifetime, the collection introduces his work to many readers. It includes the 1917 poems "Anthem for Doomed Youth" and "Dulce et Decorum est", two of the best-known poetic condemnations of war.
- December 1 – The Mexican Revolution effectively ends with a new regime coming to power.
- December 3 – Following more than a month of the Turkish–Armenian War, the Turkish-dictated Treaty of Alexandropol is concluded.
- December 7 – The first draft of the Mandate for Palestine is submitted to the League of Nations.
- December 5 – A referendum in Greece is favorable to the reinstatement of the monarchy.
- December 10 – Irish War of Independence: Martial law is declared in Counties Cork, Kerry, Limerick and Tipperary by the British authorities.
- December 11 – Burning of Cork in Ireland: British forces set fire to some 5 acres (20,000 m^{2}) of the centre of Cork, including the City Hall, in reprisal attacks, after a British auxiliary is killed in a guerilla ambush.
- December 13 – Confectionery company Haribo is founded in Bonn, Germany.
- December 15–22 – The Brussels Conference establishes a timetable for German war reparations, intended to extend for over 42 years.

Haiyuan earthquake

- December 16
  - An 8.2 Richter scale Haiyuan earthquake causes a landslide in Gansu Province, China, killing 273,000.
  - Finland joins the League of Nations.
- December 17 – South Africa is granted a League of Nations Class C mandate over South West Africa.
- December 22 – The 8th Congress of Soviets of the Russian SFSR adopts the GOELRO plan, the major scheme for the economic development of the country.
- December 23
  - The United Kingdom and France ratify the border between French-held Syria and British-held Palestine.
  - The Government of Ireland Act 1920, passed by the Parliament of the United Kingdom, receives Royal Assent from George V, providing for the partition of Ireland into Northern Ireland and Southern Ireland, with separate parliaments, granting a measure of home rule.
- December 25 – The Rosicrucian Fellowship's spiritual healing temple The Ecclesia is dedicated at Mount Ecclesia, Oceanside, California.

=== Date unknown ===
- Hydrocodone, a narcotic analgesic closely related to codeine, is first synthesized in Germany, by Carl Mannich and Helene Löwenheim.
- Approximate date – The HIV/AIDS pandemic almost certainly originates in Léopoldville, modern-day Kinshasa, the capital of the Belgian Congo.

== Births ==
=== January ===
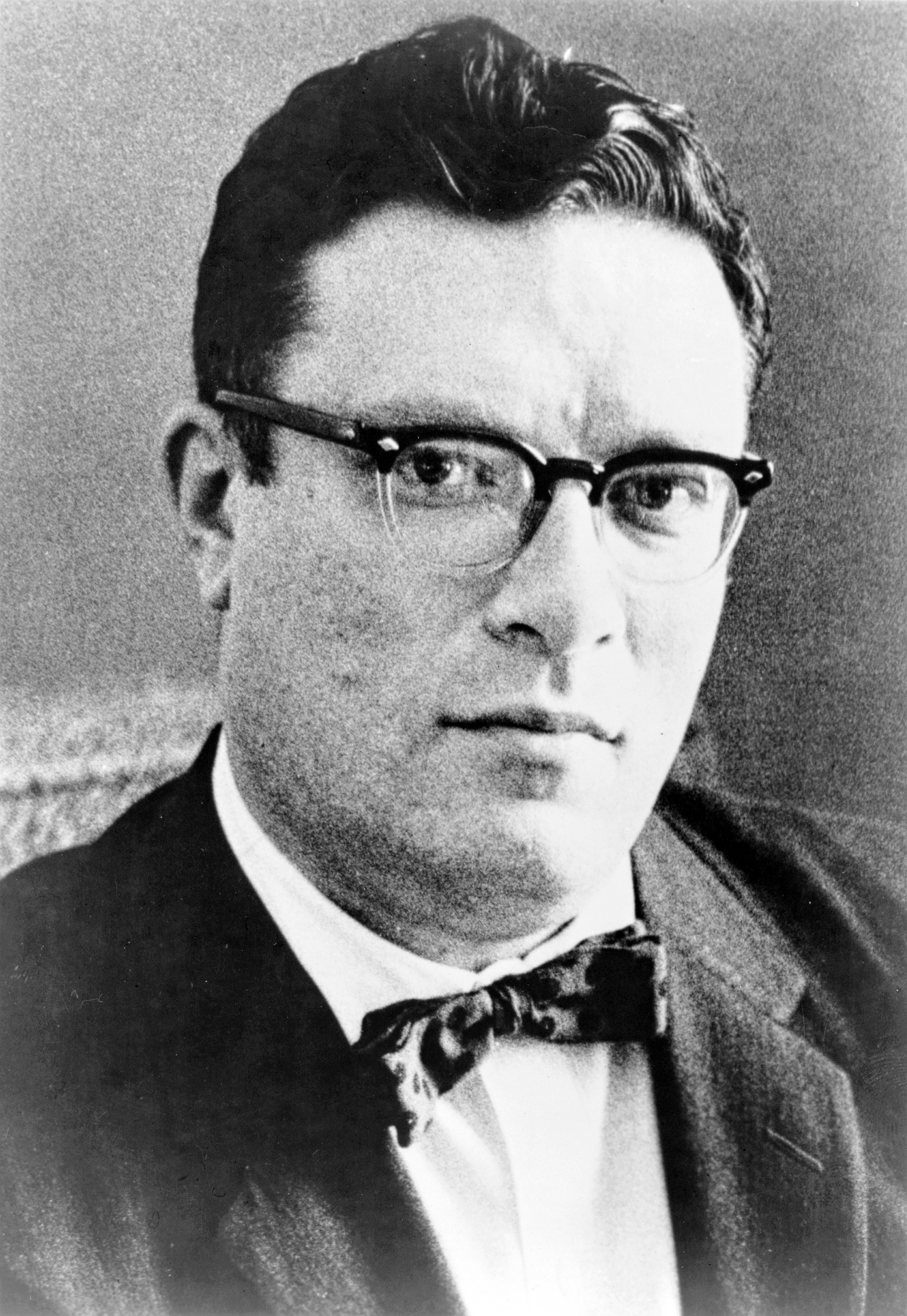
Isaac Asimov

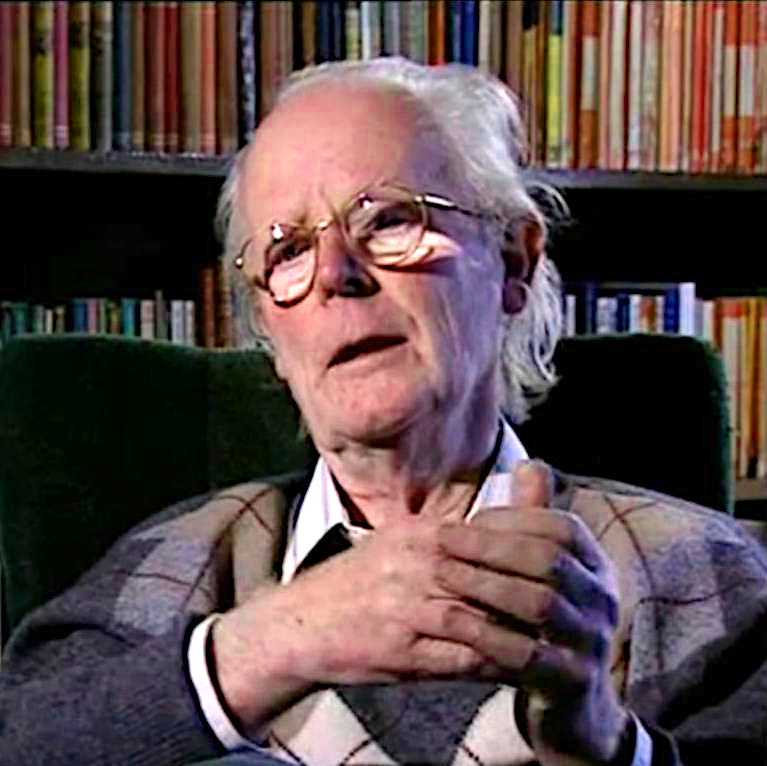
John Maynard Smith

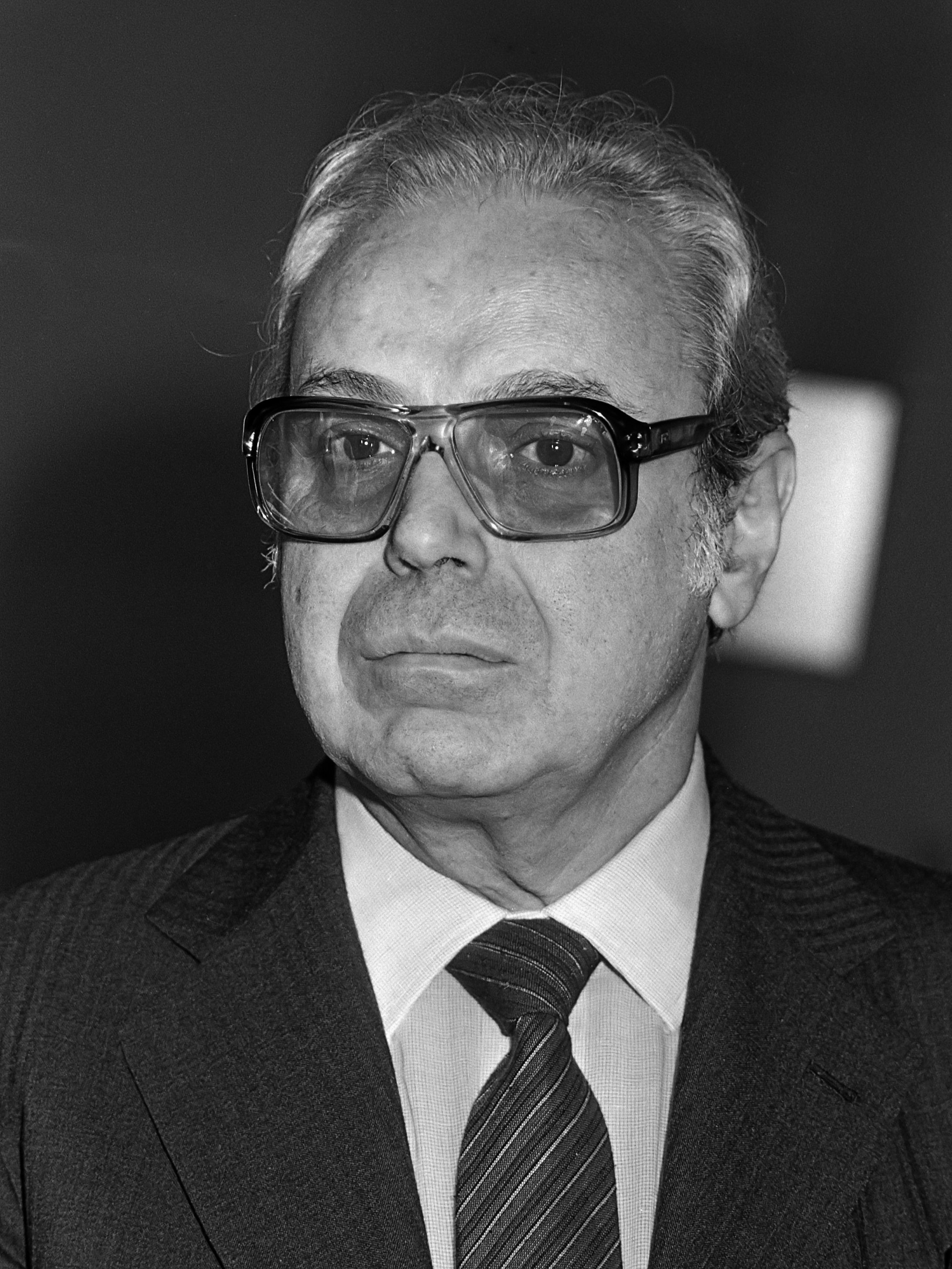
Javier Pérez de Cuéllar

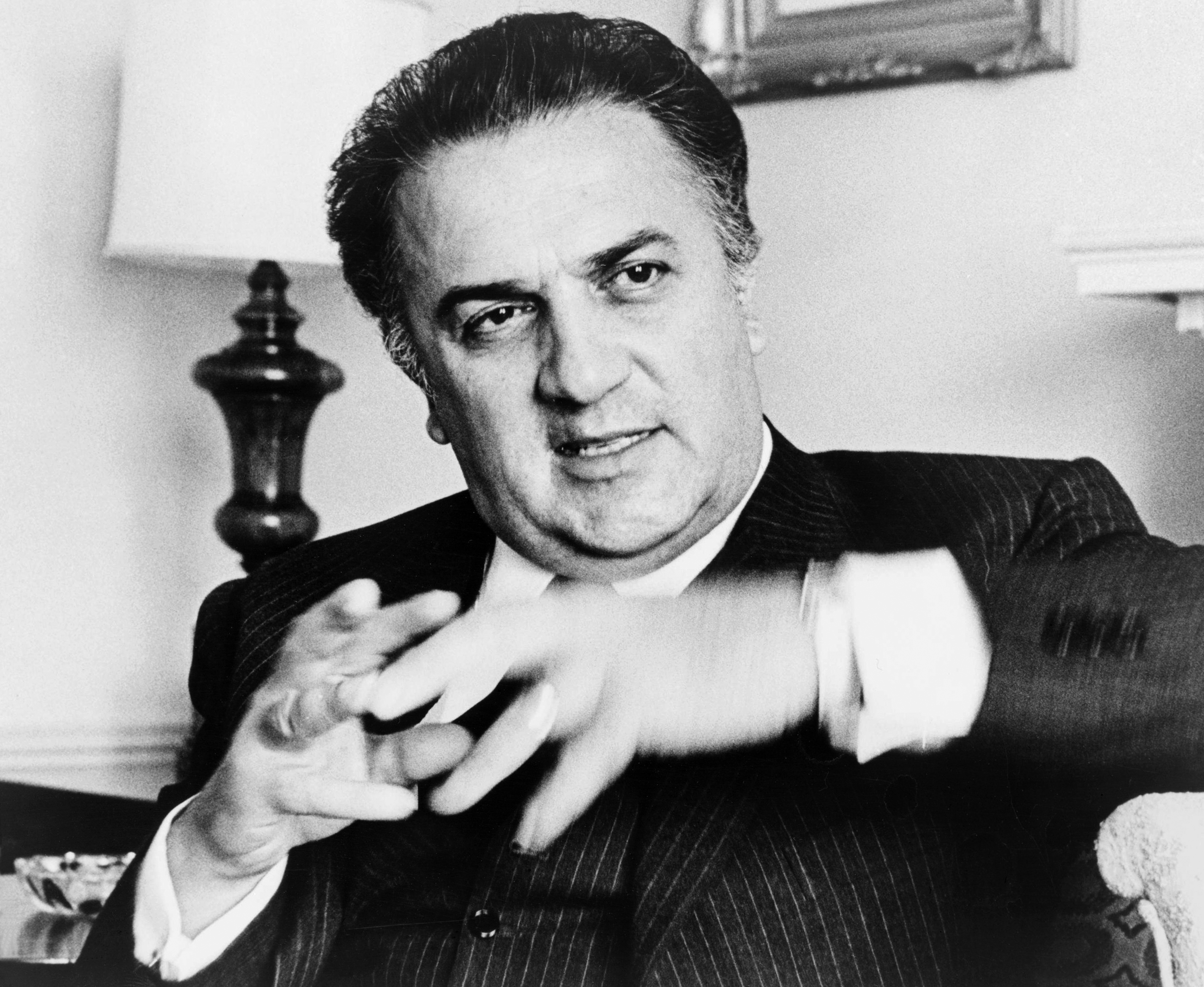
Federico Fellini

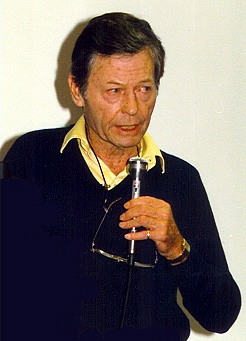
DeForest Kelley

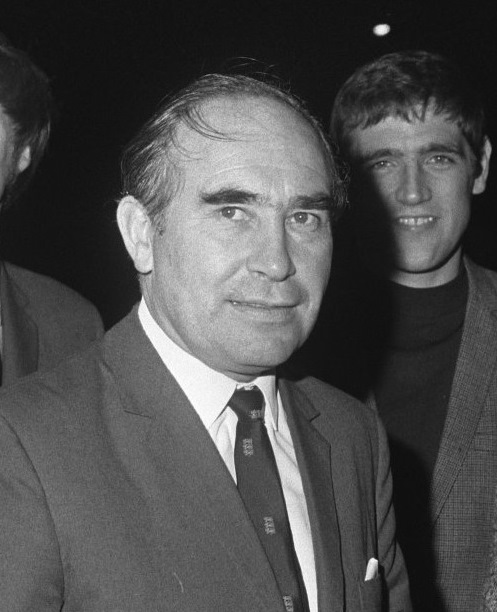
Sir Alf Ramsey

- January 2
  - Isaac Asimov, American author (d. 1992)
  - George Herbig, American astronomer (d. 2013)
  - Anne-Sofie Østvedt, Norwegian resistance leader (d. 2009)
- January 4 – David Musuguri, Tanzanian soldier and military officer (d. 2024)
- January 5 – Arturo Benedetti Michelangeli, Italian pianist (d. 1995)
- January 6
  - Sun Myung Moon, Korean evangelist, founder of the Unification Church (d. 2012)
  - John Maynard Smith, English biologist (d. 2004)
  - P. Chitran Namboodirippad, Indian writer (d. 2023)
- January 7 – Vincent Gardenia, American actor (d. 1992)
- January 8 – Abbey Simon, American classical pianist (d. 2019)
- January 9
  - Clive Dunn, British actor (d. 2012)
  - Hakim Said, Pakistani scholar, philanthropist (d. 1998)
  - Stefan Żywotko, Polish association football coach (d. 2022)
- January 10
  - Raymond Cauchetier, French photographer (d. 2021)
  - Roberto M. Levingston, Argentinian general, politician and 36th president of Argentina (d. 2015)
- January 11 – Jarbas Passarinho, Brazilian military officer, politician (d. 2016)
- January 12 – Bill Reid, Canadian artist (d. 1998)
- January 13 – Jahangir Amuzegar, Iranian economist, academic and politician (d. 2018)
- January 14 – Vahe Danielyan, Soviet soldier and concentration camp survivor
- January 15
  - Trevor Dannatt, English architect (d. 2021)
  - John O'Connor, American Catholic cardinal (d. 2000)
- January 19 – Javier Pérez de Cuéllar, Peruvian Secretary-General of the United Nations, 135th prime minister of Peru (d. 2020)
- January 20
  - Federico Fellini, Italian film director and screenwriter (d. 1993)
  - Theodore H. Geballe, American physicist (d. 2021)
  - DeForest Kelley, American actor (Star Trek) (d. 1999)
  - Fabian Ver, Filipino general (d. 1998)
- January 21 – Errol Barrow, 1st prime minister of Barbados (d. 1987)
- January 22 – Sir Alf Ramsey, English footballer and manager (d. 1999)
- January 23
  - Gottfried Böhm, German architect (d. 2021)
  - Charles Njonjo, Kenyan attorney and politician (d. 2022)
  - Walter Frederick Morrison, American entrepreneur, inventor (d. 2010)
- January 24 – Manuel Yan, Filipino general (d. 2008)
- January 25 – Alicia Montoya, Mexican actress (d. 2002)
- January 26
  - Heinz Kessler, German politician, military officer (d. 2017)
  - Vasant Raiji, Indian cricketer (d. 2020)
- January 27
  - Hiroyoshi Nishizawa, Japanese fighter ace (d. 1944)
  - Helmut Zacharias, German violinist (d. 2002)
- January 29 – Balantrapu Rajanikanta Rao, Indian writer (d. 2018)
- January 30
  - Michael Anderson, English film director (d. 2018)
  - Ben Bagdikian, Armenian American journalist, political commentator and critic (d. 2016)
  - Delbert Mann, American television and film director (d. 2007)

=== February ===
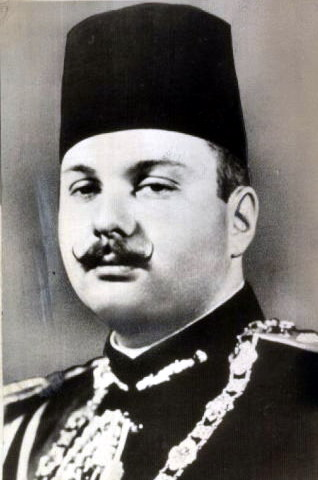
Farouk of Egypt

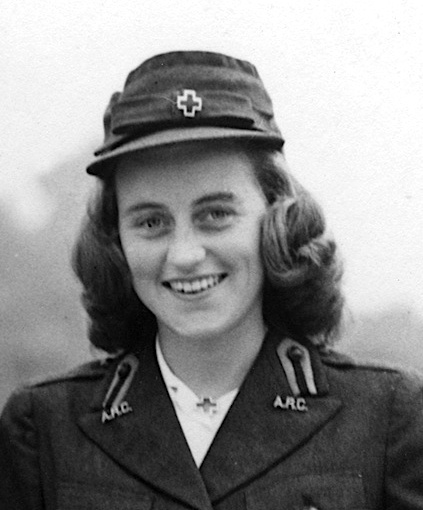
Kathleen Cavendish, Marchioness of Hartington

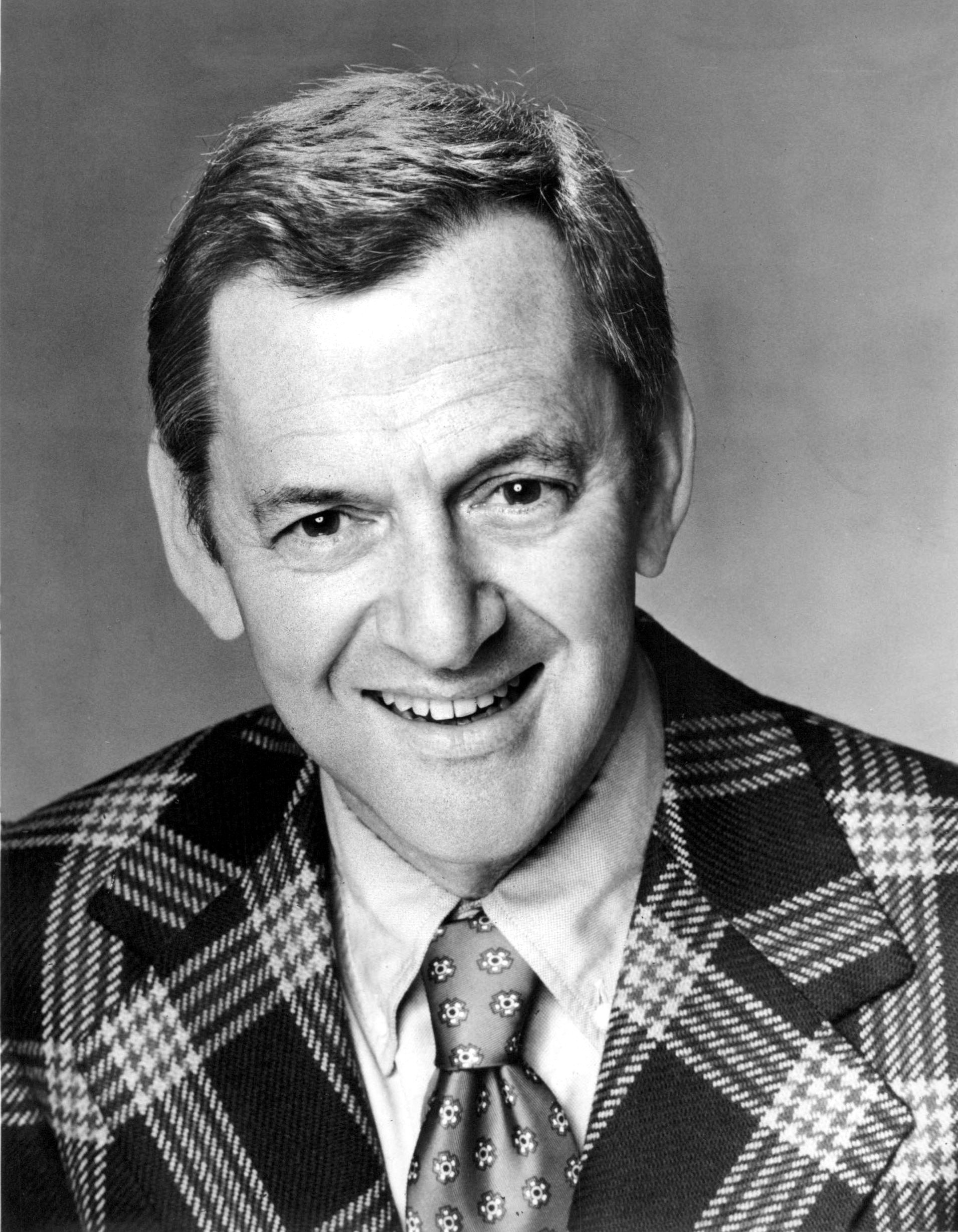
Tony Randall

- February 2 – John Russell, American Olympic equestrian (d. 2020)
- February 3 – Henry Heimlich, American physician, medical researcher (d. 2016)
- February 4 – Giriraj Kishore, Indian activist, politician (d. 2014)
- February 5 – Frank Muir, British actor, comedy writer and raconteur (d. 1998)
- February 6 – Gordon Van Wylen, American physicist and author (d. 2020)
- February 7
  - Jacqueline Diffring, German-born English sculptor (d. 2020)
  - An Wang, Chinese-born computer pioneer (d. 1990)
- February 8 – Tony Murray, French-English billionaire and businessman (d. 2023)
- February 11
  - Farouk I, King of Egypt (d. 1965)
  - George Mandel, American author (d. 2021)
- February 12
  - Heleno de Freitas, Brazilian footballer (d. 1959)
  - Yoshiko Yamaguchi, Japanese actress and singer (d. 2014)
- February 13
  - Seneka Bibile, Sri Lankan pharmacologist (d. 1977)
  - Annæus Schjødt Jr., Norwegian barrister (d. 2014)
- February 16 – Anna Mae Hays, American general (d. 2018)
- February 17 –Ivo Caprino, Norwegian film director (d. 2001)
- February 18 – Eddie Slovik, US Army private, only deserter to be executed during World War II (d. 1945)
- February 20 – Kathleen Cavendish, Marchioness of Hartington (d. 1948)
- February 24 – Fortune FitzRoy, Duchess of Grafton, English noble (d. 2021)
- February 26
  - Hilmar Baunsgaard, Danish politician (d. 1989)
  - Tony Randall, American actor (d. 2004)
  - Lucjan Wolanowski, Polish journalist, writer and traveler (d. 2006)
  - Henry Hu, Hong Kong barrister (d. 2025)
- February 28
  - Alf Kjellin, Swedish film actor and director (d. 1988)
  - Jadwiga Piłsudska, Polish pilot (d. 2014)
  - Zaim Topčić, Bosnian writer (d. 1990)
- February 29
  - Howard Nemerov, American poet (d. 1991)
  - Michele Morgan, French actress (d. 2016)

=== March ===
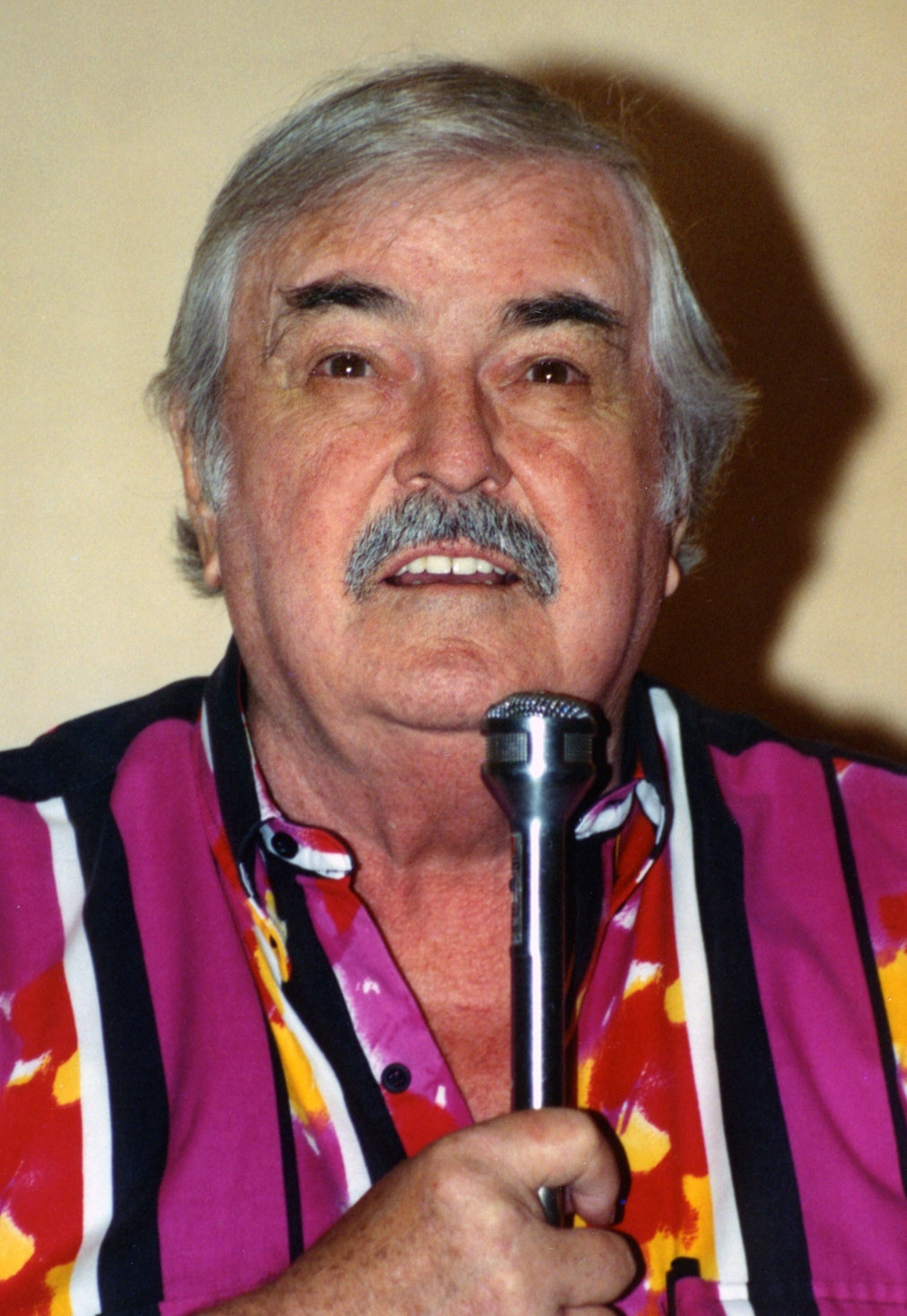
James Doohan

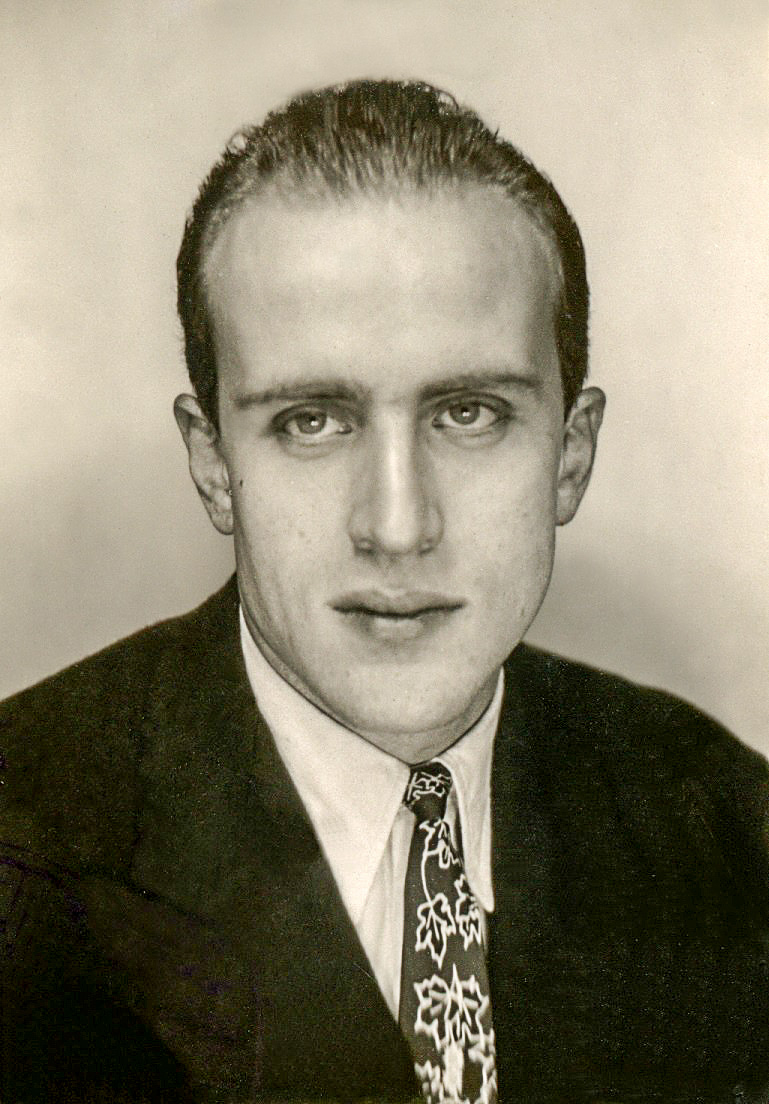
Boris Vian

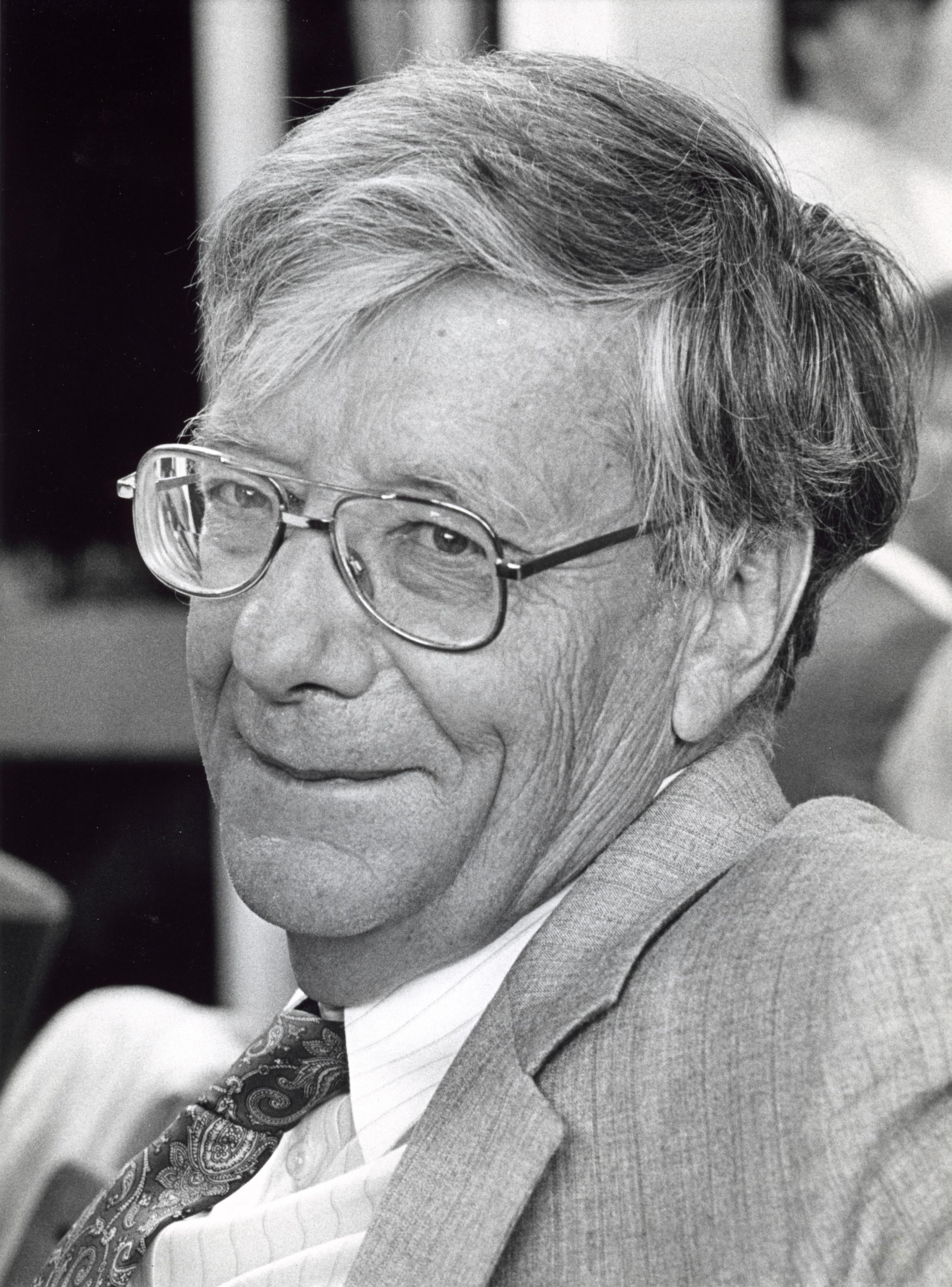
Nicolaas Bloembergen

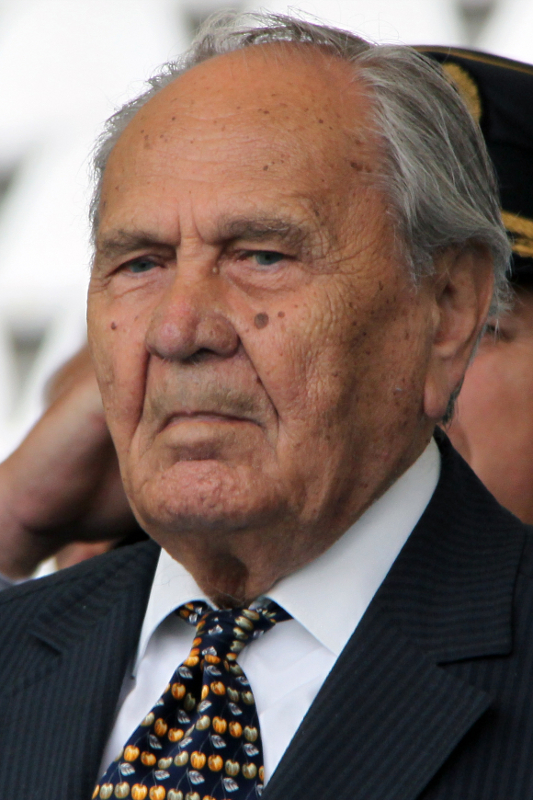
Josip Manolić

- March 3
  - James Doohan, Canadian actor, voice actor, author and soldier (Star Trek) (d. 2005)
  - Ronald Searle, British cartoonist (d. 2011)
- March 4 – Jean Lecanuet, French politician (d. 1993)
- March 5 – Rachel Gurney, British actress (d. 2001)
- March 6
  - Lewis Gilbert, British film director, producer and screenwriter (d. 2018)
  - Celina Seghi, Italian alpine skier (d. 2022)
- March 8 – Ingemar Hedberg, Swedish canoeist (d. 2019)
- March 9 – Franjo Mihalić, Croatian-Serbian athlete (d. 2015)
- March 10
  - Robert Cardenas, American Air Force general (d. 2022)
  - Alfred Peet, Dutch American entrepreneur, founder of Peet's Coffee & Tea (d. 2007)
  - Boris Vian, French writer, poet, singer and musician (d. 1959)
- March 11
  - Nicolaas Bloembergen, Dutch physicist, Nobel Prize laureate (d. 2017)
  - Ben Ferencz, Hungarian American lawyer (d. 2023)
- March 14 – Hank Ketcham, American cartoonist (d. 2001)
- March 15
  - Sid Hartman, American sports journalist (d. 2020)
  - Lawrence Sanders, American novelist (d. 1998)
  - E. Donnall Thomas, American physician, recipient of the Nobel Prize in Physiology or Medicine (d. 2012)
- March 16 – Leo McKern, Australian actor (d. 2002)
- March 17 – Sheikh Mujibur Rahman, founder, 2-time president and second prime minister of Bangladesh (d. 1975)
- March 20
  - Pamela Harriman, English-born American diplomat, socialite (d. 1997)
  - Vickie Panos, Greek Canadian female professional baseball player (d. 1986)
  - Qemal Stafa, Albanian politician (d. 1942)
  - Rosemary Timperley, British author (d. 1988)
- March 21 – Éric Rohmer, French film director (d. 2010)
- March 22
  - Josip Manolić, Prime Minister of Croatia (d. 2024)
  - Fanny Waterman, English pianist, educator (d. 2020)
  - Helmut Winschermann, German oboist, conductor and teacher (d. 2021)
- March 23
  - Tetsuharu Kawakami, Japanese baseball player, coach (d. 2013)
  - Neal Edward Smith, American pilot, lawyer and politician (d. 2021)
- March 24 – Corbin Harney, elder and spiritual leader of the Newe (Western Shoshone) people (d. 2007)
- March 25 – Patrick Troughton, English actor (d. 1987)
- March 26 – Ernest Courant, American accelerator physicist (d. 2020)
- March 27 – William Moncrief, American businessman (d. 2021)
- March 29
  - Marion Mann, American physician and pathologist (d. 2022)
  - Gottfried Weilenmann, Swiss racing cyclist (d. 2018)
- March 31
  - Deborah Cavendish, Duchess of Devonshire (d. 2014)
  - Marga Minco, Dutch journalist, writer (d. 2023)

=== April ===
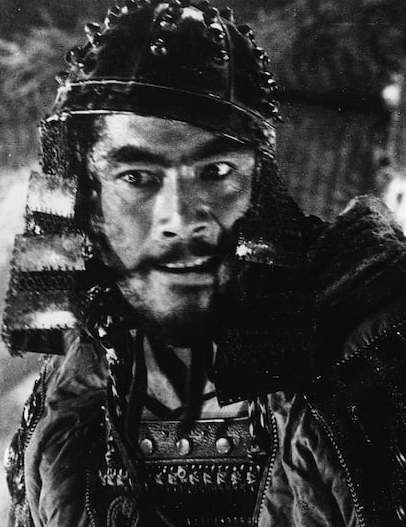
Toshiro Mifune

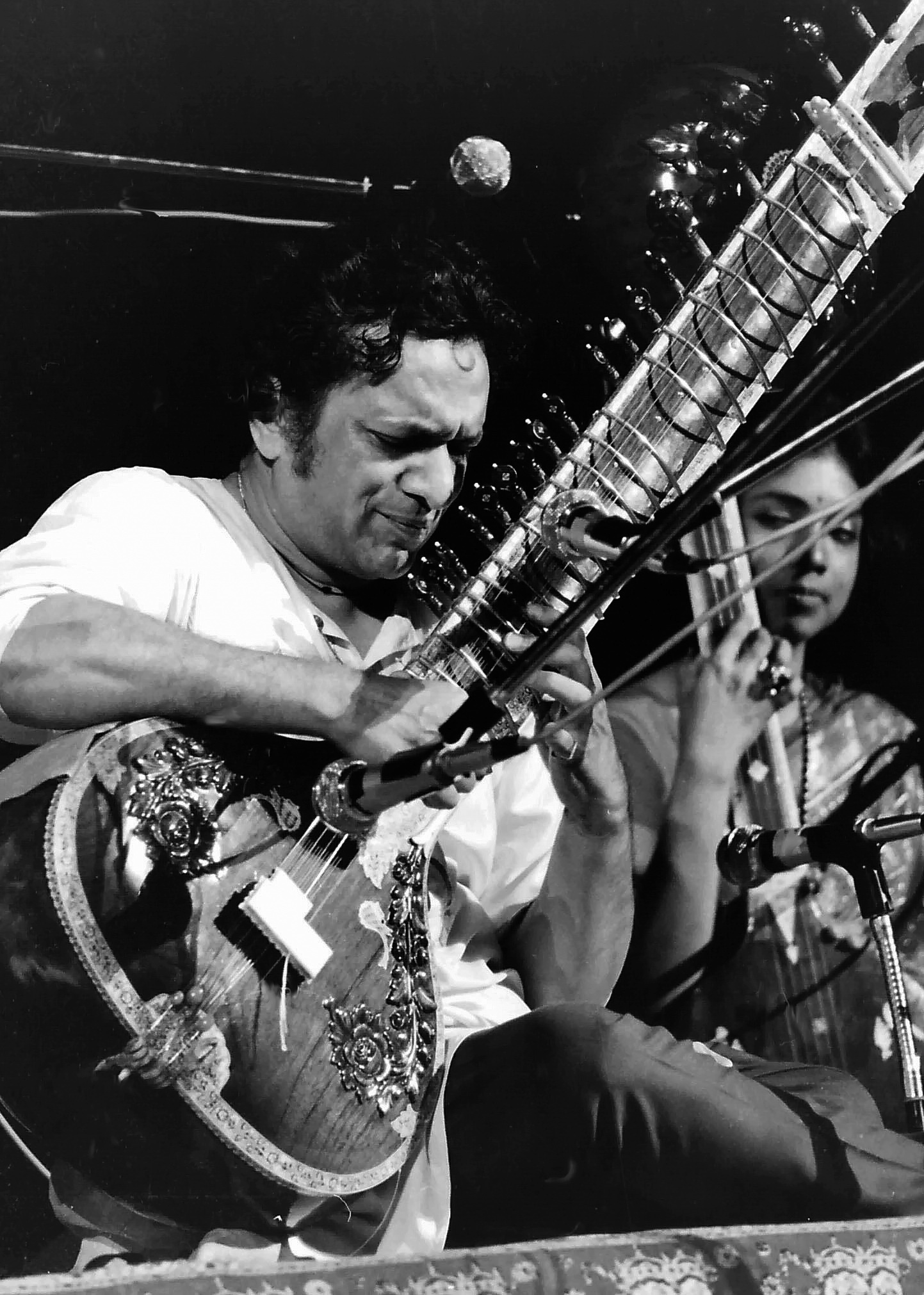
Ravi Shankar

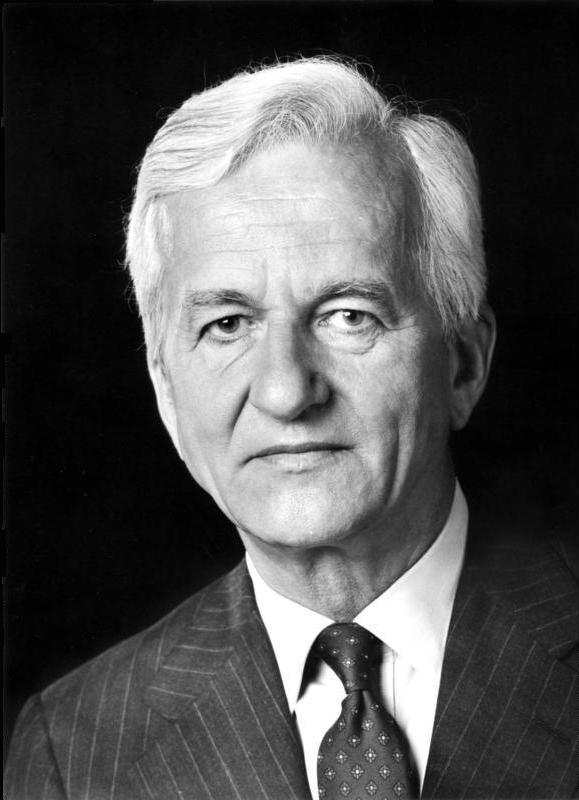
Richard von Weizsäcker

- April 1
  - Toshiro Mifune, Japanese actor (d. 1997)
  - Yosh Uchida, American judo coach, businessman, entrepreneur and educator (d. 2024)
- April 3 – Ehsan Yarshater, Iranian scholar (d. 2018)
- April 5
  - Barend Biesheuvel, Dutch politician, Prime Minister of the Netherlands from 1971 until 1973 (d. 2001)
  - Arthur Hailey, American writer (d. 2004)
- April 6 – Edmond H. Fischer, Swiss American biochemist, recipient of the Nobel Prize in Physiology or Medicine (d. 2021)
- April 7 – Ravi Shankar, Indian sitar player (d. 2012)
- April 11
  - Emilio Colombo, 40th prime minister of Italy (d. 2013)
  - Peter O'Donnell, British author, comic strip writer (d. 2010)
- April 12 – Anita Ellis, Canadian-American singer and actress (d. 2015)
- April 13
  - Roberto Calvi, Italian banker (d. 1982)
  - Marthe Cohn, French author and Holocaust survivor (d. 2025)
  - Liam Cosgrave, sixth Taoiseach of Ireland (d. 2017)
  - Theodore L. Thomas, American chemical engineer, Patent attorney and writer (d. 2005)
- April 14
  - Stanley Stutz, American basketball player (d. 1975)
  - Antônio Afonso de Miranda, Brazilian Roman Catholic bishop (d. 2021)
  - Eleonore Schönborn, Austrian politician (d. 2022)
- April 15
  - Thomas Szasz, Hungarian-born psychiatrist, writer (d. 2012)
  - Richard von Weizsäcker, German politician, President of Germany (1984–1994) (d. 2015)
- April 16
  - Prince Georg of Denmark (d. 1986)
  - Bill Sidwell, Australian tennis player (d. 2021)
- April 17 – Arnold Yarrow, British actor (d. 2024)
- April 18 – Wang Zigan, modern papercutting artist, master of arts and crafts (d. 2000)
- April 19
  - Gene Leis, American jazz guitarist, educator (d. 1993)
  - Ragnar Ulstein, Norwegian journalist and writer (d. 2019)
- April 20 – John Paul Stevens, American judge, Associate Justice of the Supreme Court (d. 2019)
- April 21 – Edmund Adamkiewicz, German footballer (d. 1991)
- April 22 – Valeri Petrov, Bulgarian poet (d. 2014)
- April 23 – Kim Hyung-suk, South Korean philosopher
- April 25
  - Robert Q. Lewis, American radio and television personality (d. 1991)
  - Marko Račič, Slovenian athlete (d. 2022)
- April 26 – Padú del Caribe, Aruban musician and songwriter (d. 2019)
- April 27 – Guido Cantelli, Italian conductor (d. 1956)
- April 30
  - Diet Eman, Dutch author and resistance worker (d. 2019)
  - Gerda Lerner, Austrian American historian and woman's history author (d. 2013)
  - Captain Sir Tom Moore, English army officer and fundraiser (d. 2021)

=== May ===
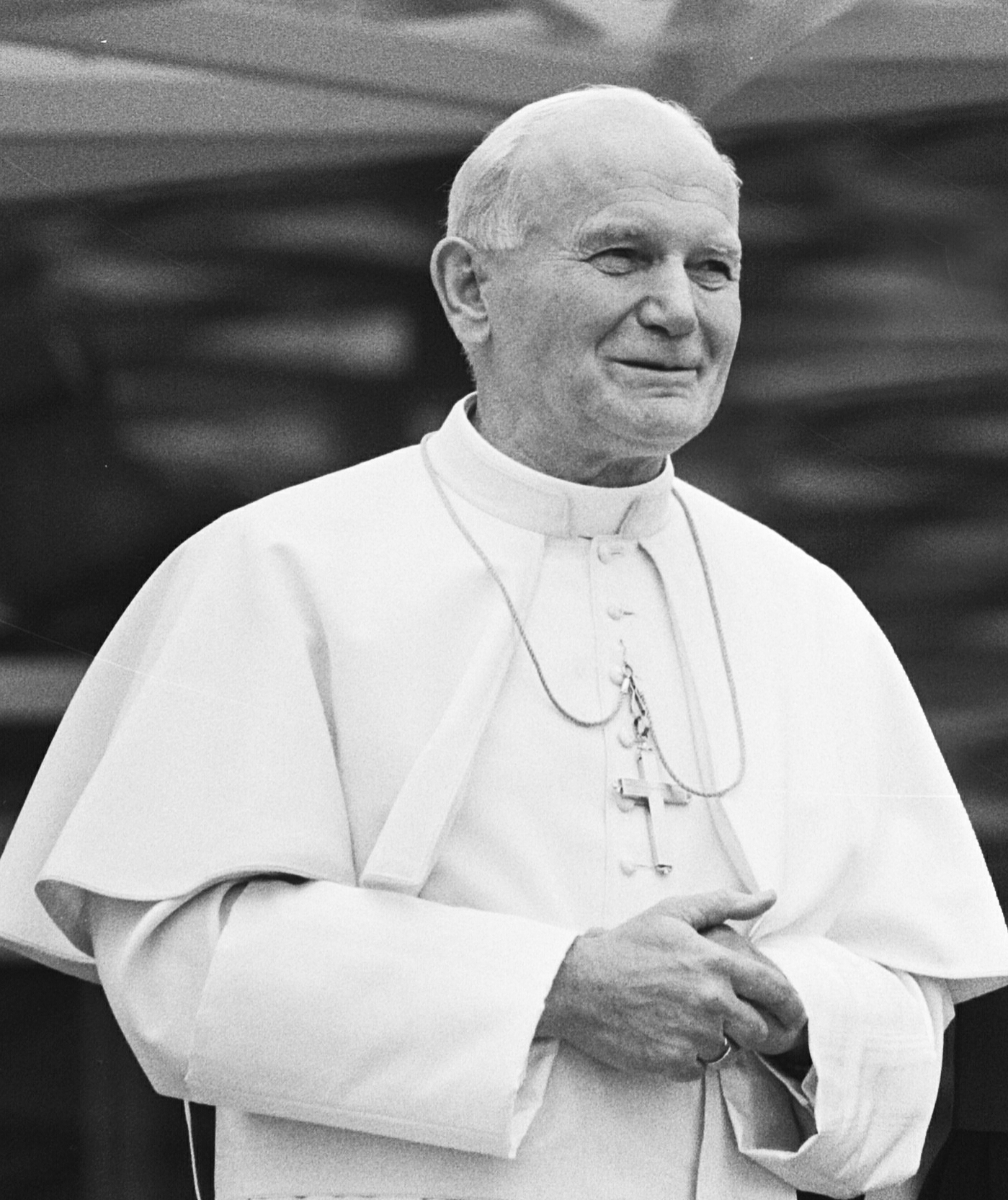
Pope John Paul II

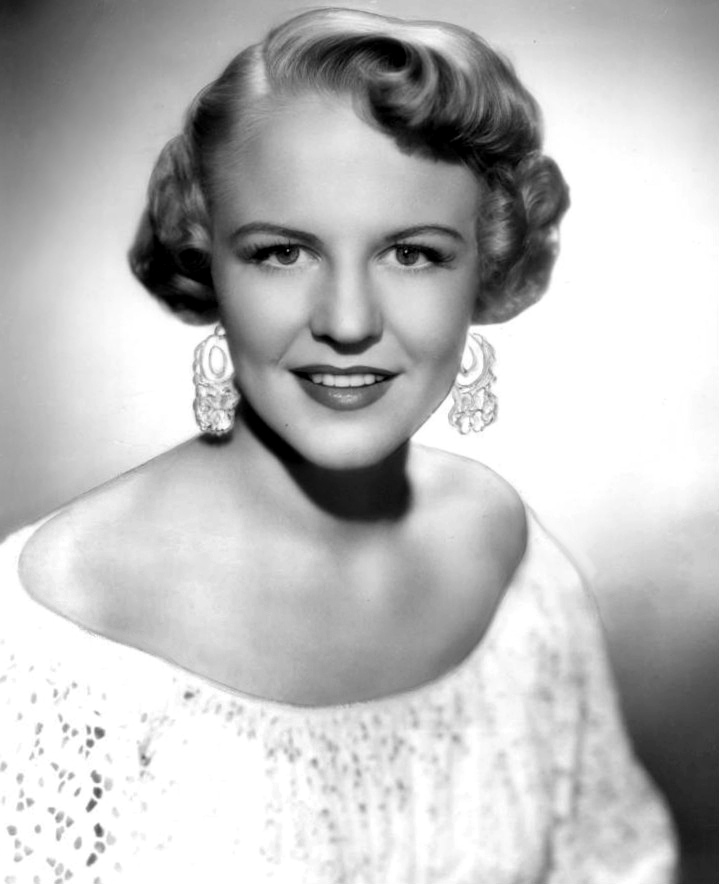
Peggy Lee

- May 1 – Alan Burgess, New Zealand cricketer (d. 2021)
- May 2
  - Jean-Marie Auberson, Swiss conductor (d. 2004)
  - Otto Buchsbaum, Austrian-born writer, ecological activist (d. 2000)
  - Joe "Mr Piano" Henderson, Scottish pianist and composer (d. 1980)
  - Joan van der Waals, Dutch physicist (d. 2022)
- May 5 – Jon Naar, British-American author, photographer (d. 2017)
- May 6
  - Mollie Lentaigne, English medical artist and Red Cross Voluntary Aid Detachment nurse (d. 2024)
  - Ratu Sir Kamisese Mara, first prime minister of Fiji and President of Fiji (d. 2004)
- May 8
  - Tom of Finland, Finnish artist (d. 1991)
  - Jean Maran, French politician (d. 2021)
  - Saul Bass, American graphic designer (d. 1996)
- May 9
  - Michael Dauncey, British Army brigadier (d. 2017)
  - Mitsuko Mori, Japanese actress (d. 2012)
- May 10 – Richard Adams, English novelist (d. 2016)
- May 11 – Gene Hermanski, American baseball player (d. 2010)
- May 12
  - John Tyler Bonner, American biologist (d. 2019)
  - Gerald Stapleton, South African Battle of Britain fighter pilot (d. 2010)
- May 13 – Vassos Lyssarides, Cypriot politician and physician (d. 2021)
- May 15 – Nasrallah Boutros Sfeir, Lebanese cardinal (d. 2019)
- May 17 – Lydia Wideman, Finnish Olympic cross-country skier (d. 2019)
- May 18 – Pope John Paul II (d. 2005)
- May 19
  - Ted Knap, American journalist (d. 2023)
  - Tina Strobos, Dutch psychiatrist known for rescuing Jews during World War II (d. 2012)
- May 20
  - John Cruickshank, Scottish Victoria Cross recipient (d. 2025)
  - Betty Driver, British singer and actress (d. 2011)
  - Domenico Leccisi, Italian politician (d. 2008)
- May 21 – Sonja de Lennart, German fashion designer
- May 22 – Helen Andelin, American author (d. 2009)
- May 23 – Helen O'Connell, American singer (d. 1993)
- May 25 – Arthur Wint, Jamaican runner (d. 1992)
- May 26
  - John Dall, American actor (d. 1971)
  - Peggy Lee, American singer (d. 2002)
- May 28 – Gene Levitt, American television writer, producer and director (d. 1999)
- May 29 – John Harsanyi, Hungarian-born economist, Nobel Prize laureate (d. 2000)
- May 30
  - Godfrey Binaisa, President of Uganda (d. 2010)
  - James F. Leonard, American diplomat (d. 2020)
  - Frederick M. Nicholas, American lawyer (d. 2025)
  - Franklin Schaffner, American film, television director (d. 1989)
  - Shōtarō Yasuoka, Japanese writer (d. 2013)

=== June ===
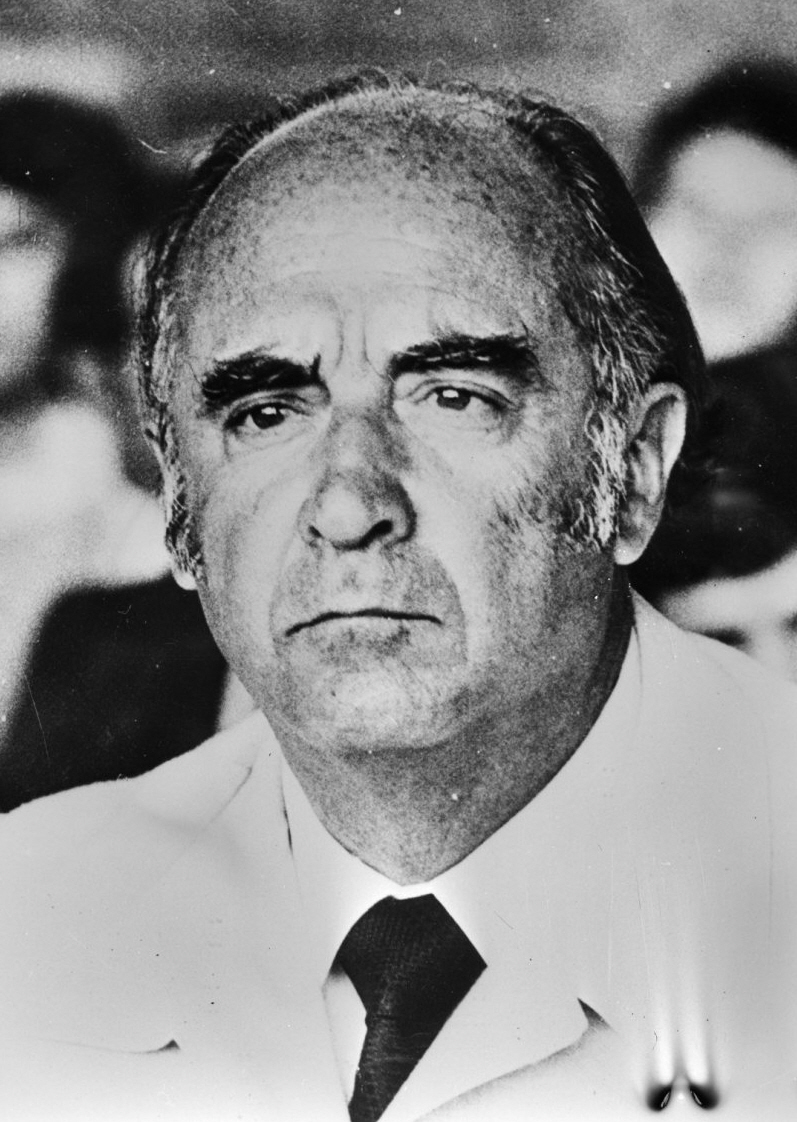
José López Portillo

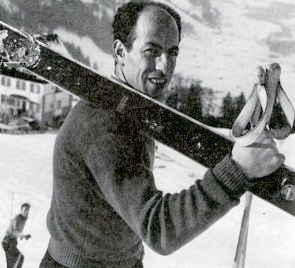
Zeno Colò

- June 1 – Amos Yarkoni, Israeli soldier (d. 1991)
- June 2
  - Marcel Reich-Ranicki, German literary critic, member of the literary Gruppe 47 (d. 2013)
  - Tex Schramm, American football executive (d. 2003)
  - Johnny Speight, British television scriptwriter (d. 1998)
- June 4 – Mia Bustam, Indonesian painter, writer, and political prisoner (d. 2011)
- June 5 – Marion Motley, American football player (d. 1999)
- June 10
  - Ruth Graham, American evangelist, wife of Billy Graham (d. 2007)
  - Paula Stafford, Australian fashion designer (d. 2022)
- June 11
  - Albin Chalandon, French politician (d. 2020)
  - King Mahendra of Nepal (d. 1972)
- June 12 – Dave Berg, American cartoonist (d. 2002)
- June 13
  - Rolf Huisgen, German chemist and academic (d. 2020)
  - Larry Kenney, American basketball player (d. 2021)
- June 14 – Bob Brogoitti, American politician (d. 2009)
- June 15 – Alberto Sordi, Italian actor (d. 2003)
- June 16
  - Eva Estrada-Kalaw, Filipino politician (d. 2017)
  - José López Portillo, 51st president of Mexico (d. 2004)
  - Bob Ryland, American tennis player (d. 2020)
- June 17
  - Patrick Duffy, English economist and president of the NATO Assembly (d. 2026)
  - Jacob H. Gilbert, American politician (d. 1981)
  - Setsuko Hara, Japanese actress (d. 2015)
  - François Jacob, French biologist, recipient of the Nobel Prize in Physiology or Medicine (d. 2013)
  - Peter Le Cheminant, Guernesiase air force commander (d. 2018)
- June 18
  - Utta Danella, German writer (d. 2015)
  - Aster Berkhof, Belgian author and academic (d. 2020)
- June 19 – Eliana Navarro, Chilean poet (d. 2006)
- June 20
  - Amos Tutuola, Nigerian writer (d. 1997)
  - Thomas Jefferson, American musician (d. 1986)
- June 21 – Hans Gerschwiler, Swiss figure skater (d. 2017)
- June 22
  - Lester Wunderman, American executive (d. 2019)
  - Jack Karwales, American football player (d. 2004)
  - Walt Masterson, American right-handed baseball pitcher (d. 2008)
  - Paul Frees, American voice actor (d. 1986)
  - Jovito Salonga, Filipino statesman (d. 2016)
- June 23 – Saleh Ajeery, Kuwaiti astronomer (d. 2022)
- June 25
  - Jeanne Tomasini, Corsican writer (d. 2022)
  - Lassie Lou Ahern, American actress (d. 2018)
  - Ozan Marsh, American pianist (d. 1992)
- June 27 – Fernando Riera, Chilean football player, manager (d. 2010)
- June 28 – Clarissa Eden, wife of British prime minister Anthony Eden (d. 2021)
- June 29
  - Armin Hofmann, Swiss graphic designer (d. 2020)
  - Ray Harryhausen, American animator (d. 2013)
- June 30
  - Eleanor Ross Taylor, American poet (d. 2011)
  - Zeno Colò, Italian Olympic alpine skier (d. 1993)

=== July ===
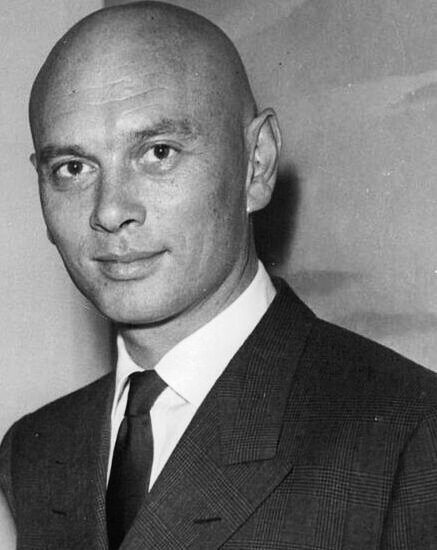
Yul Brynner

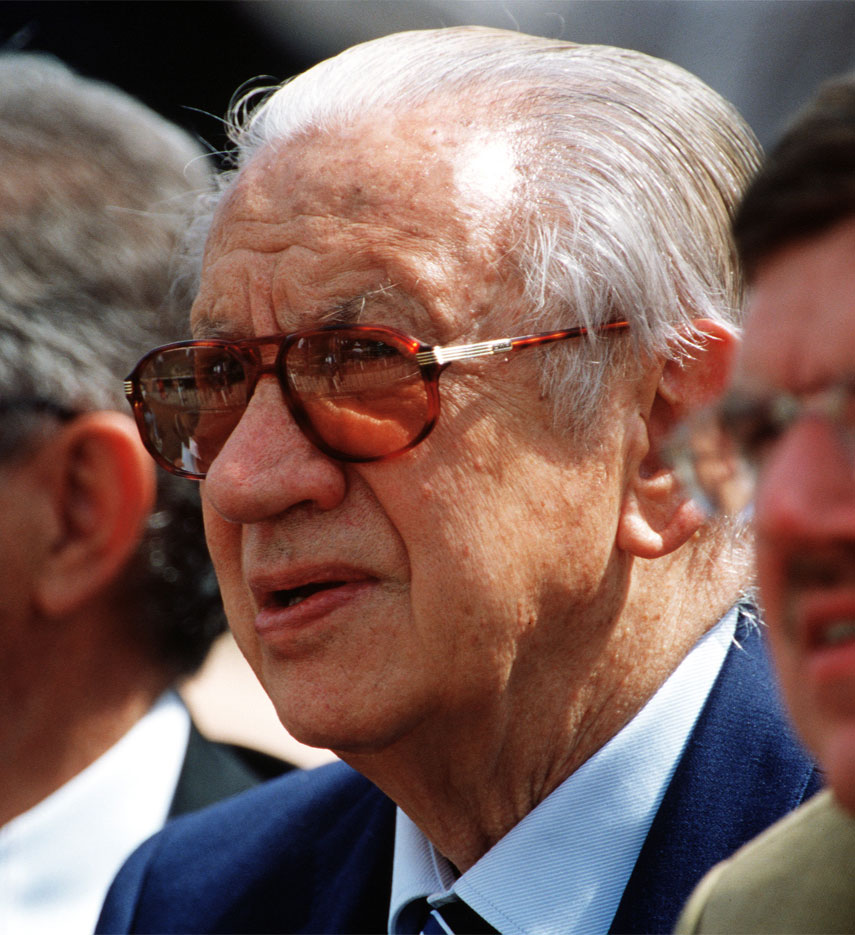
Juan Antonio Samaranch

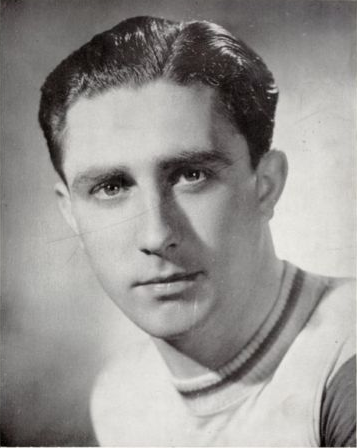
Émile Idée

- July 1
  - George I. Fujimoto, American chemist (d. 2023)
  - Aziz Sedky, Egyptian politician, engineer (d. 2008)
  - Lucidio Sentimenti, Italian footballer (d. 2014)
- July 3 – Lennart Bladh, Swedish politician (d. 2006)
- July 4
  - Anthony Barber, British Conservative politician (d. 2005)
  - Leona Helmsley, American hotel operator, real estate investor (d. 2007)
- July 5
  - Mary Louise Hancock, American politician (d. 2017)
  - Viola Harris, American actress (d. 2017)
  - Rosemarie Springer, German equestrian (d. 2019)
- July 7
  - Sandy Tatum, American golfer (d. 2017)
  - William Thaddeus Coleman Jr., American attorney, politician (d. 2017)
- July 10
  - Owen Chamberlain, American physicist, Nobel Prize laureate (d. 2006)
  - J. T. White, American college football assistant coach (d. 2005)
  - Milo Anstadt, Dutch-Jewish writer, journalist (d. 2011)
- July 11
  - Hudson William Edison Ntsanwisi, South African Politician, Gazankulu Chief Minister (d. 1993)
  - Yul Brynner, Russian actor (d. 1985)
  - Zecharia Sitchin, Soviet-born American author (d. 2010)
- July 12 – Randolph Quirk, British linguist, life peer (d. 2017)
- July 14 – Marijohn Wilkin, American songwriter (d. 2006)
- July 15
  - Theresa Kobuszewski, American professional baseball player, World War II veteran (d. 2005)
  - Prince Michael Andreevich of Russia (d. 2008)
- July 16
  - Ulysses S. Washington, American college football player, coach (d. 2018)
  - Larry Jansen, American right-handed pitcher, coach (d. 2009)
- July 17
  - Juan Antonio Samaranch, Spanish International Olympic Committee president (d. 2010)
  - Gordon Gould, American physicist (d. 2005)
  - June Vincent, American actress (d. 2008)
- July 18
  - Zheng Min, Chinese scholar and poet (d. 2022)
  - Dolph Sweet, American actor (d. 1985)
- July 19
  - Émile Idée, French professional road bicycle racer (d. 2024)
  - Robert Mann, American violinist (d. 2018)
  - Frank Maznicki, American football player (d. 2013)
  - George Dawkes, English cricketer (d. 2006)
- July 20
  - Jasper Blackall, British sailor (d. 2020)
  - Byron Krieger, American foil, sabre and épée fencer (d. 2015)
- July 21
  - Jean Daniel, Algerian-born French-Jewish journalist and author (d. 2020)
  - Gunnar Thoresen, Norwegian footballer (d. 2017)
  - Constant Nieuwenhuys, Dutch painter (d. 2005)
  - Isaac Stern, Ukrainian-born violinist (d. 2001)
  - Ndabaningi Sithole, Zimbabwean politician (d. 2000)
- July 23
  - L. Martin Griffin, American environmentalist and conservationist (d. 2024)
  - Amália Rodrigues, Portuguese fado singer and actress (d. 1999)
- July 24 – Bella Abzug, American feminist politician (d. 1998)
- July 25
  - Rosalind Franklin, British crystallographer (d. 1958)
  - David P. Buckson, American lawyer, politician (d. 2017)
- July 27 – Howard Hibbett, American translator (d. 2019)
- July 28 – Lea Padovani, Italian film actress (d. 1991)
- July 29 – Elói, Portuguese footballer (d. 2000)
- July 30 – Lady Brigid Guinness of the United Kingdom (d. 1995)
- July 31 – Franca Valeri, Italian actress (d. 2020)

=== August ===
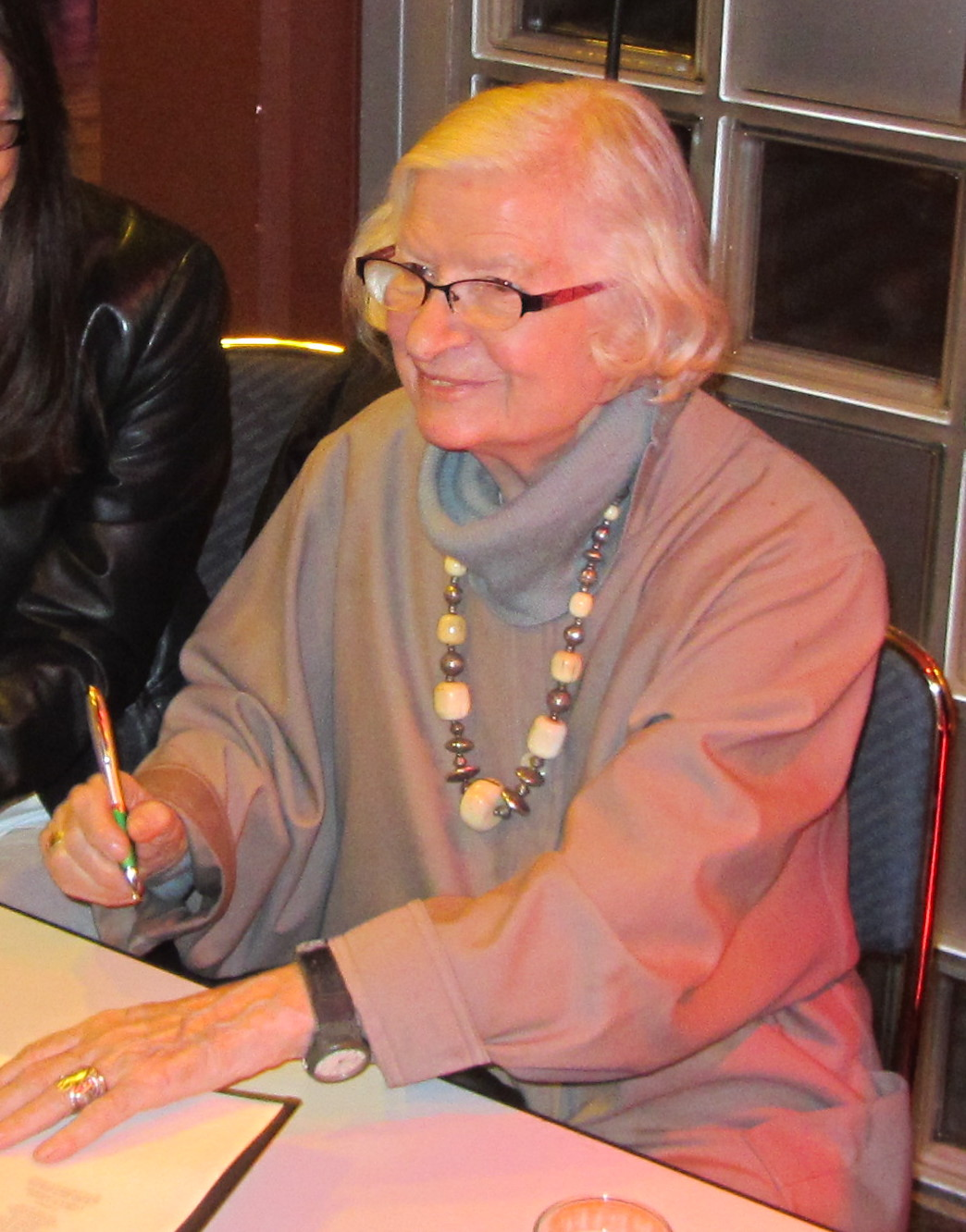
P. D. James

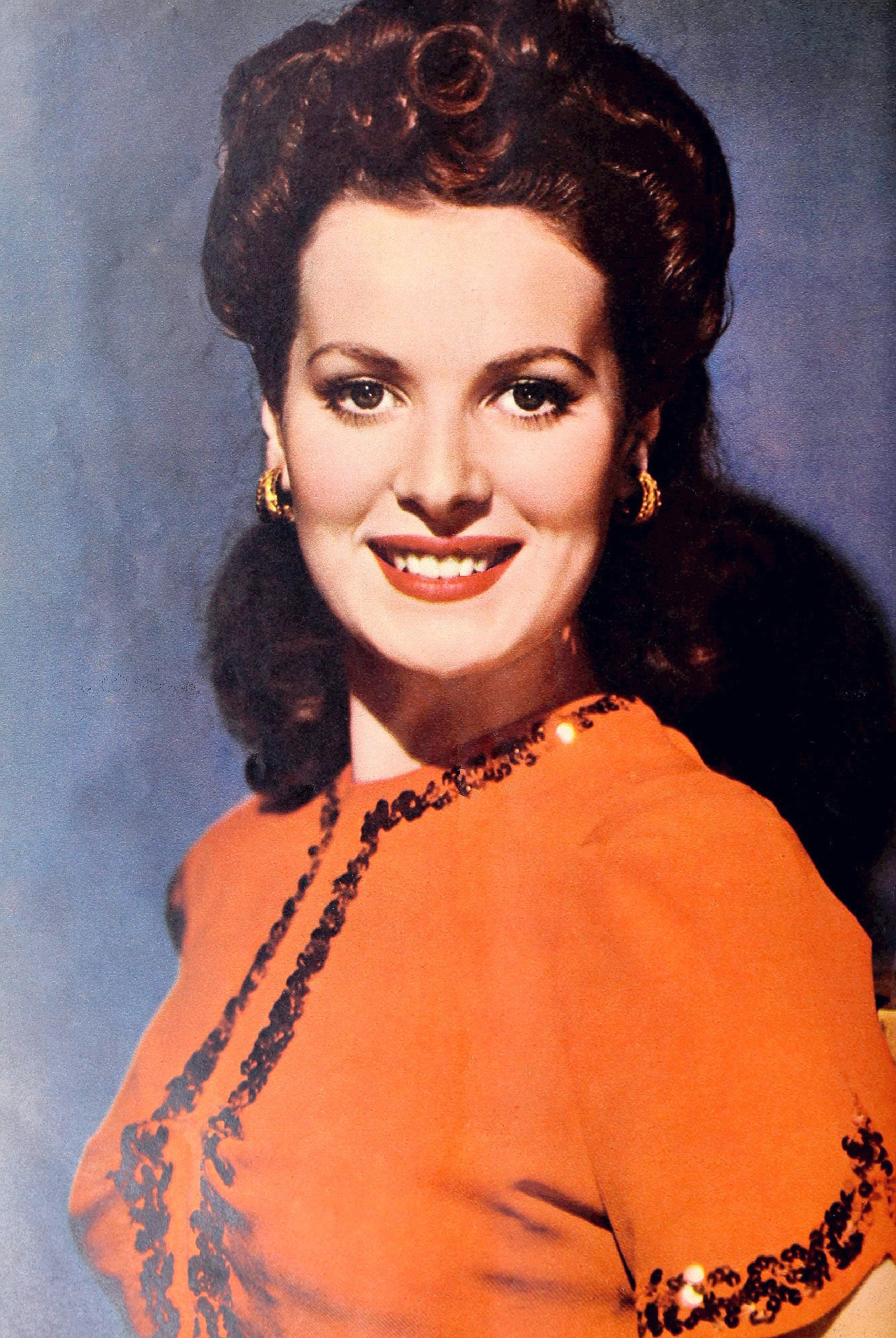
Maureen O'Hara

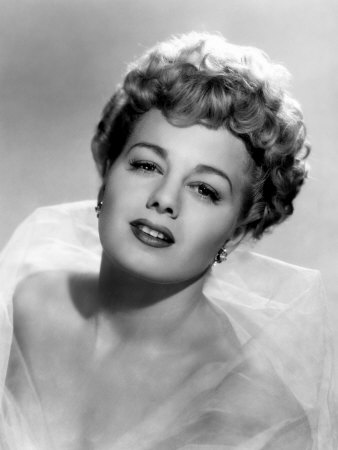
Shelley Winters

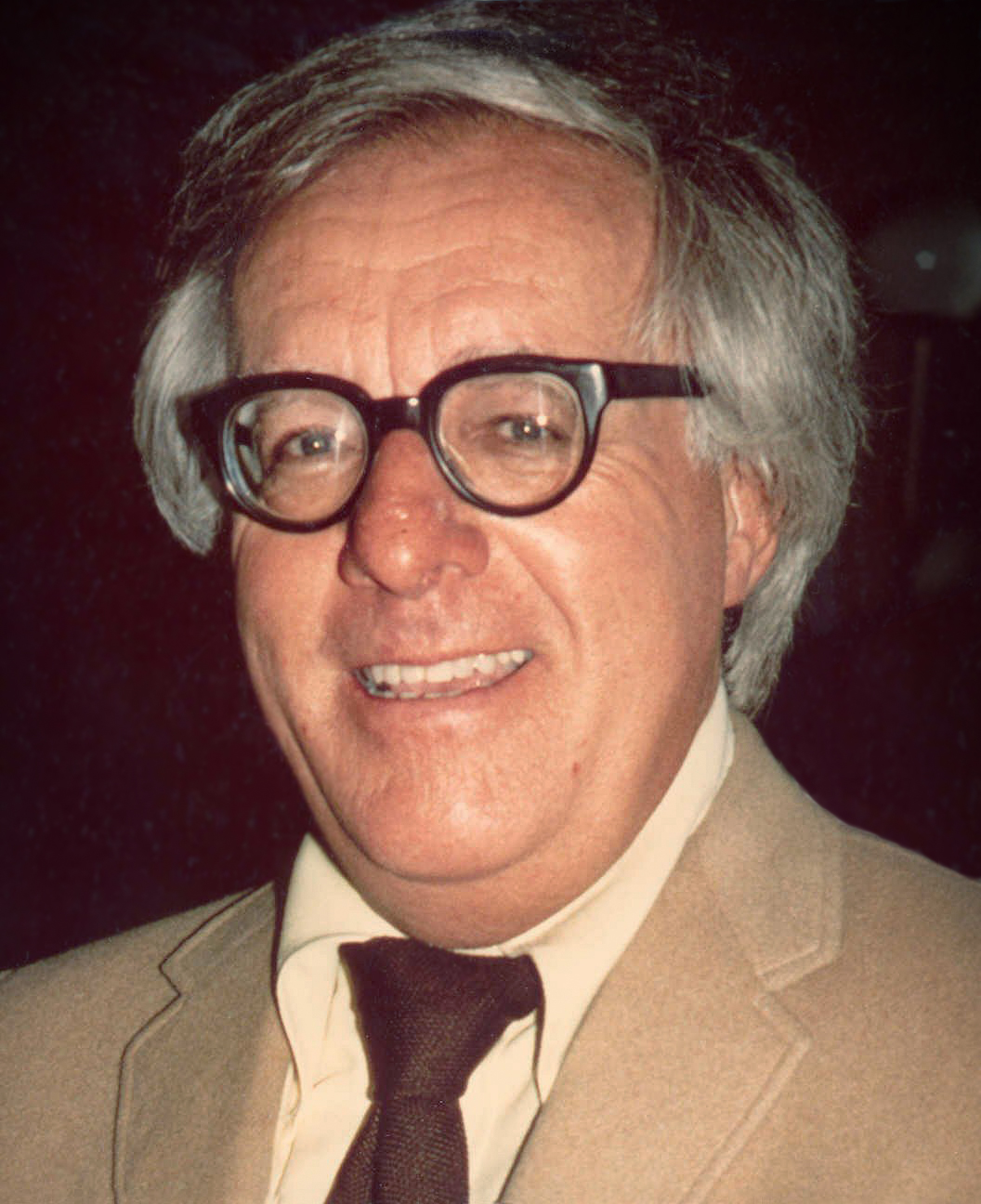
Ray Bradbury

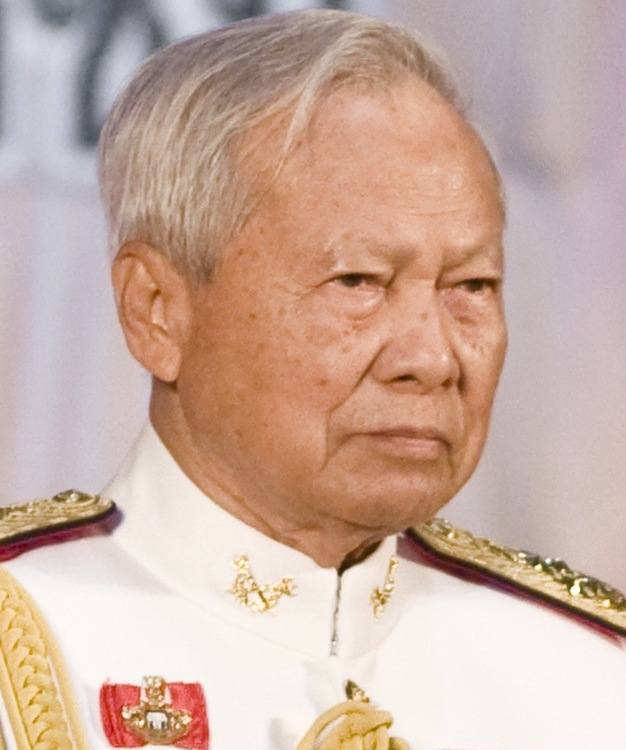
Prem Tinsulanonda

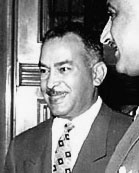
Ali Sabri

- August 1 – Sammy Lee, Korean-American diver (d. 2016)
- August 3 – P. D. James, English mystery novelist (d. 2014)
- August 4
  - John Figueroa, Jamaican poet (d. 1999)
  - Helen Thomas, American author, news service reporter, member of the White House press corps and columnist (d. 2013)
- August 5
  - Bill Grayden, Australian politician (d. 2026)
  - Mickey Shaughnessy, Irish-American character actor, comedian (d. 1985)
  - Selma Diamond, Canadian-American comedic actress (d. 1985)
- August 6 – Ella Raines, American actress (d. 1988)
- August 7
  - Glauco Della Porta, Italian politician, economist (d. 1976)
  - Françoise Adret, French ballet dancer, choreographer (d. 2018)
  - Mario Astorri, Italian football player, coach (d. 1989)
- August 8
  - Leo Chiosso, Italian poet (d. 2006)
  - Dominique Marcas, French actress (d. 2022)
  - Jimmy Witherspoon, American singer (d. 1997)
- August 9
  - Willi Heinrich, German Second World War veteran, later an author (d. 2005)
  - Milton G. Henschel, American member of the Governing Body of Jehovah's Witnesses, 5th president of the Watch (d. 2003)
- August 10
  - Ann Harnett, American female baseball player (d. 2006)
  - Red Holzman, American basketball coach (d. 1998)
- August 11 – Florence Bjelke-Petersen, Australian politician, writer (d. 2017)
- August 12 – Anna-Kaarina Aalto, Finnish physician and politician (d. 1994)
- August 13 – Neville Brand, American actor, highly decorated World War II combat soldier (d. 1992)
- August 14 – María Teresa Linares Savio, Cuban musicologist (d. 2021)
- August 15
  - Prince Konstantin of Bavaria (d. 1969)
  - Peter Lloyd, Australian aviator (d. 2022)
- August 16 – Charles Bukowski, American writer (d. 1994)
- August 17 – Maureen O'Hara, Irish-American actress (d. 2015)
- August 18
  - Bob Kennedy, American baseball player, manager (d. 2005)
  - Mervyn Lee, Australian politician (d. 2009)
  - Shelley Winters, American actress (d. 2006)
  - Godfrey Evans, English cricketer (d. 1999)
- August 20 – Boris Braun, Croatian university professor and Holocaust survivor (d. 2018)
- August 21 – Christopher Robin Milne, English author, bookseller (d. 1996)
- August 22 – Ray Bradbury, American science fiction writer (d. 2012)
- August 26
  - Prem Tinsulanonda, Thai politician, 16th prime minister of Thailand (d. 2019)
  - Richard E. Bellman, American mathematician (d. 1984)
  - Alberte Pullman, French theoretical and quantum chemist (d. 2011)
- August 27 – Baptiste Manzini, American football player (d. 2008)
- August 28 – Jaime de Almeida, Brazilian football player, manager (d. 1973)
- August 29 – Charlie Parker, African-American saxophonist, composer (d. 1955)
- August 30 – Ali Sabri, Egyptian politician, 32nd prime minister of Egypt (d. 1991)

=== September ===
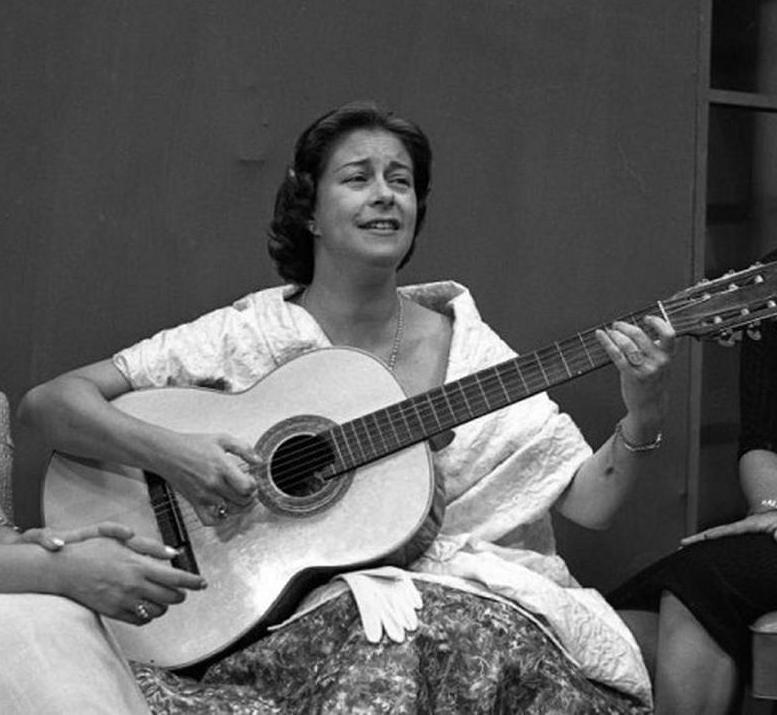
Chabuca Granda

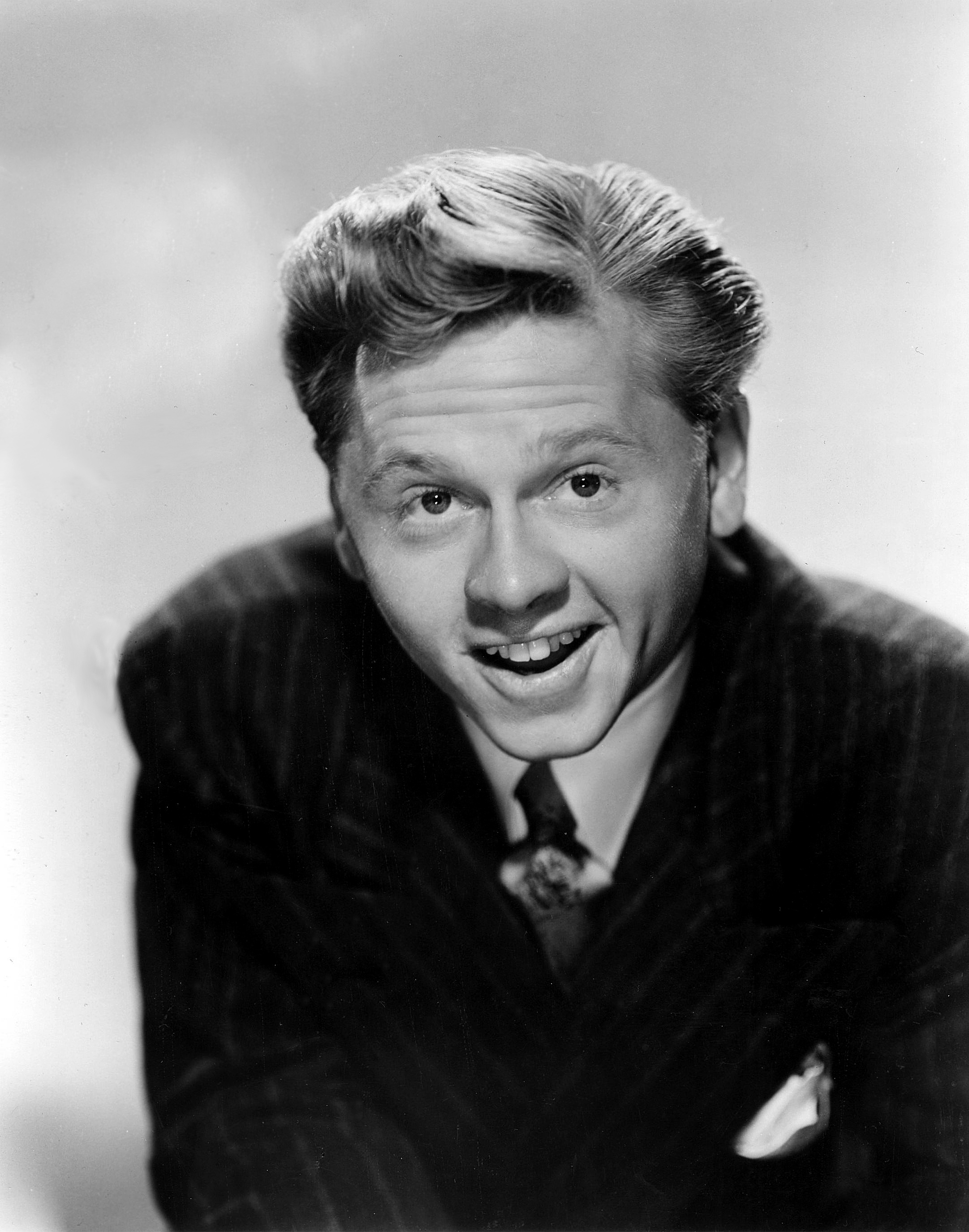
Mickey Rooney

- September 1
  - Richard Farnsworth, American actor, stuntman (d. 2000)
  - Rayson Huang, Hong Kong chemist (d. 2015)
- September 2 – Mónica Echeverría, Chilean journalist, writer, actress and a Literature professor (d. 2020)
- September 5 – Apolonia Muñoz Abarca, American health professional and reproductive rights advocate (d. 2009)
- September 8
  - Lawrence LeShan, American psychologist, educator and author (d. 2020)
  - Lesław Bartelski, Polish male writers (d. 2006)
- September 10
  - Robert F. Inger, American herpetologist (d. 2019)
  - C. R. Rao, Indian-born American mathematician and statistician (d. 2023)
  - Fabio Taglioni, Italian motorcycle engineer (d. 2001)
- September 12
  - Darussalam, Indonesian actor (d. 1993)
  - Lore Lorentz, German cabaret artist, standup comedian (d. 1994)
- September 13
  - Else Holmelund Minarik, Danish-American author and illustrator (d. 2012)
  - Alan Sagner, American public servant, political fundraiser (d. 2018)
- September 14
  - Mario Benedetti, Uruguayan writer (d. 2009)
  - Don Johnson, American football player (d. 1965)
  - Hans Pfann, German gymnast (d. 2021)
  - Fuad Stephens, Malaysian politician (d. 1976)
  - Lawrence Klein, American economist, Nobel Prize laureate (d. 2013)
- September 15 – Dave Garcia, American baseball coach, manager (d. 2018)
- September 17
  - Marjorie Holt, American politician (d. 2018)
  - Hans Otto Jung, German viticulturist, jazz musician and patron of music (d. 2009)
- September 18 – Jack Warden, American actor (d. 2006)
- September 19 – Roger Angell, American journalist, author and editor (d. 2022)
- September 20 – Jay Ward, American animation producer (d. 1989)
- September 21 – Kenneth McAlpine, English racing driver (d. 2023)
- September 22 – William H. Riker, American political scientist (d. 1993)
- September 23 – Mickey Rooney, American actor, dancer and entertainer (d. 2014)
- September 24
  - Dick Bong, American fighter ace (d. 1945)
  - Harber H. Hall, American politician (d. 2020)
  - Ovadia Yosef, Israeli Chief Rabbi (d. 2013)
- September 25 – Wan Haifeng, Chinese military officer (d. 2023)
- September 27
  - William Conrad, American actor, film director and producer (d. 1994)
  - Alan A. Freeman, English record producer (d. 1985)
- September 29 – Peter D. Mitchell, English chemist, Nobel Prize laureate (d. 1992)
- September 30 – Milton P. Rice, American politician (d. 2018)
- Unknown – Wu Ningkun, Chinese academic (d. 2019)

=== October ===
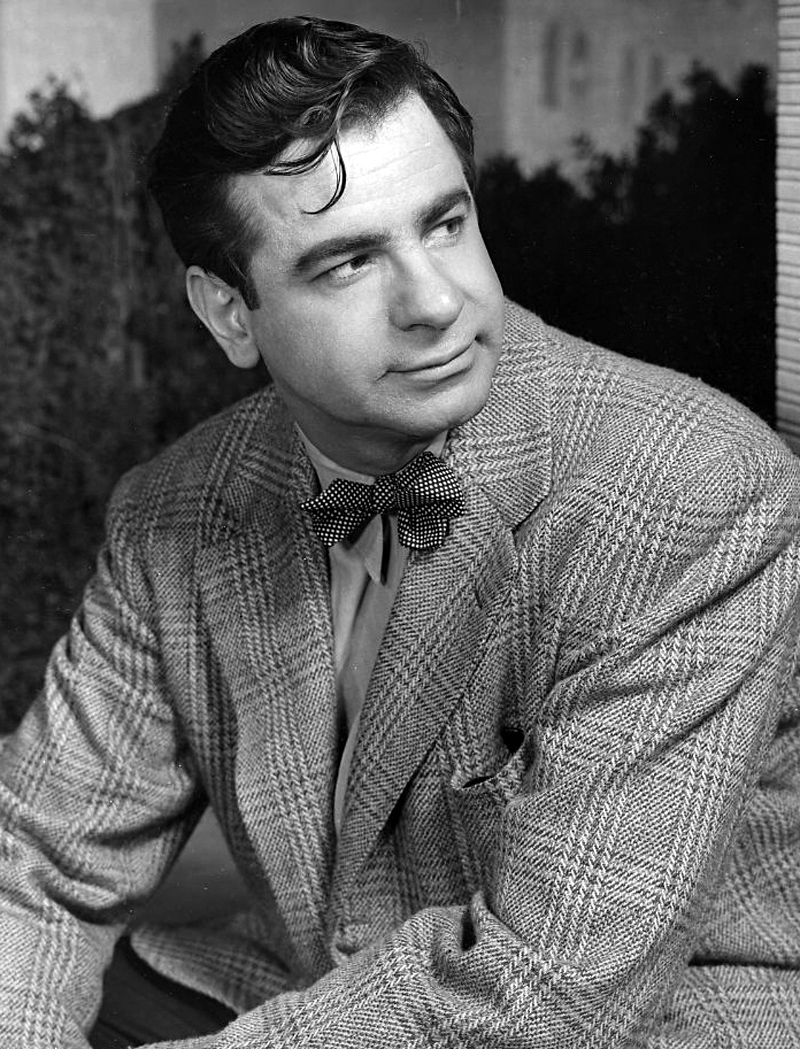
Walter Matthau

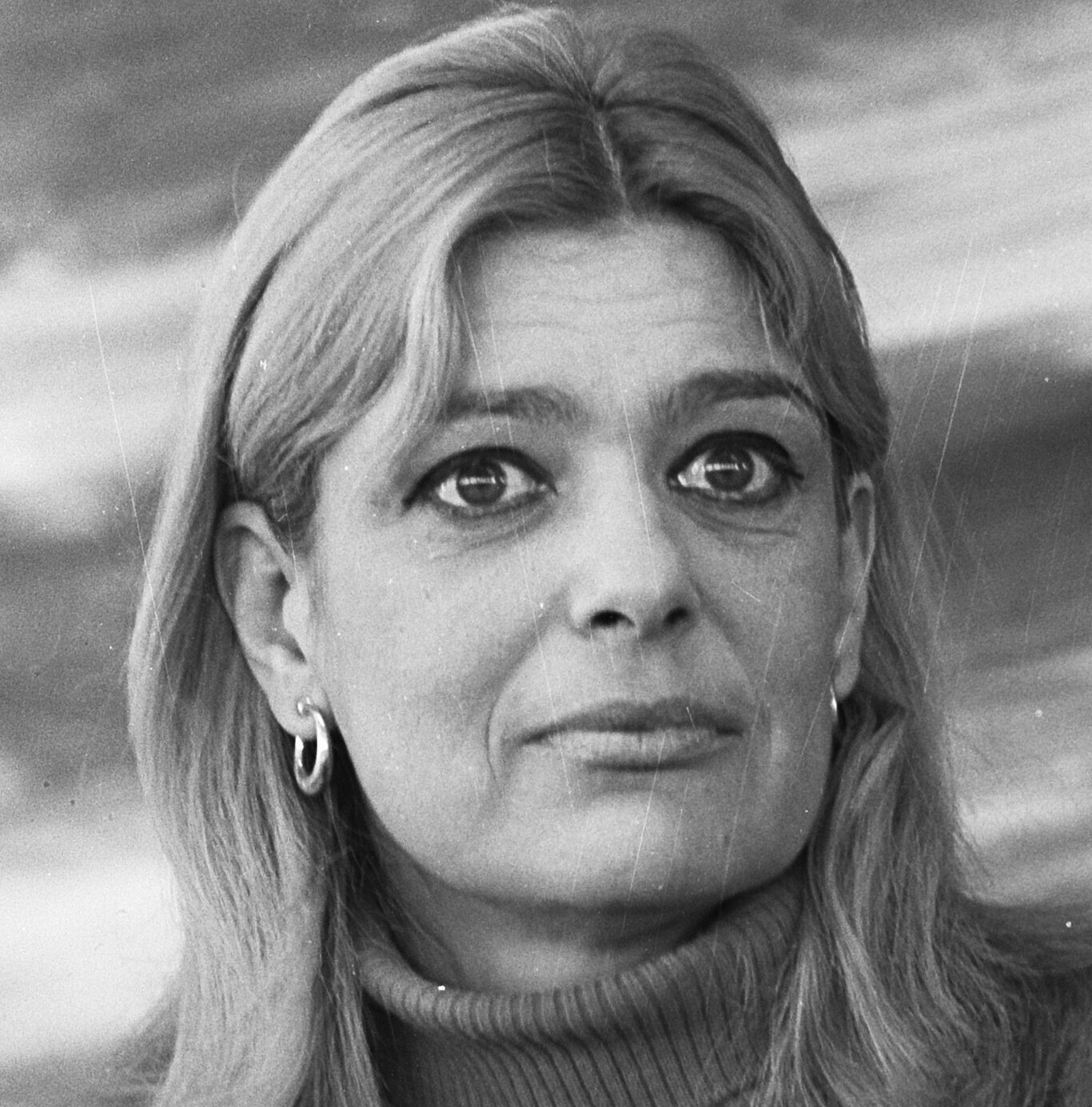
Melina Mercouri

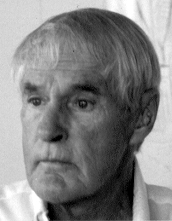
Timothy Leary

- October 1
  - Charles Daudelin, Canadian sculptor (d. 2001)
  - Walter Matthau, American actor (d. 2000)
- October 2 – Tun Tin, 6th prime minister of Burma (d. 2020)
- October 3 – Bung Tomo, Indonesian military leader and 1st Minister of State (d. 1981)
- October 4 – Charles Burrell, American musician (d. 2025)
- October 5 – Ralph Turlington, American politician (d. 2021)
- October 6 – Pietro Consagra, Italian sculptor (d. 2005)
- October 8 – Frank Herbert, American author (d. 1986)
- October 9
  - Jens Bjørneboe, Norwegian author (d. 1976)
  - Yusef Lateef, American jazz musician, composer (d. 2013)
  - Jason Wingreen, American actor (d. 2015)
- October 10
  - Gail Halvorsen, American Air Force pilot (d. 2022)
  - Noah Keen, American actor (d. 2019)
  - Zou Yu, Chinese jurist and politician
- October 12 – Steve Conway, British singer (d. 1952)
- October 13
  - Laraine Day, American actress (d. 2007)
  - Donald Russell, English author (d. 2020)
- October 15 – Mario Puzo, American author (d. 1999)
- October 16 – Alicia Dussán de Reichel, Colombian educator (d. 2023)
- October 17
  - Claire Barry, American singer (The Barry Sisters) (d. 2014)
  - Montgomery Clift, American actor (d. 1966)
  - Miguel Delibes, Spanish novelist (d. 2010)
- October 18 – Melina Mercouri, Greek actress and politician (d. 1994)
- October 19 – Pandurang Shastri Athavale, Indian founder of the Swadhyay Movement (d. 2003)
- October 20
  - Janet Jagan, 6th president of Guyana (d. 2009)
  - Siddhartha Shankar Ray, Indian politician, Chief Minister of West Bengal (d. 2010)
- October 21 – Ruth Terry, American singer, actress (d. 2016)
- October 22 – Timothy Leary, American psychologist, author and proponent of LSD (d. 1996)
- October 23 – Vern Stephens, American baseball player (d. 1968)
- October 25 – J. Denis Summers-Smith, English ornithologist and mechanical engineer (d. 2020)
- October 26
  - Sarah Lee Lippincott, American astronomer (d. 2019)
  - Robert D. Maxwell, American Medal of Honour recipient (d. 2019)
- October 27 – K. R. Narayanan, President of India (d. 2005)
- October 29
  - Baruj Benacerraf, Venezuelan-born immunologist, recipient of the Nobel Prize in Physiology or Medicine (d. 2011)
  - Hilda Bernard, Argentine actress (d. 2022)
- October 31
  - Dedan Kimathi, Kenyan revolutionary leader (d. 1957)
  - Dick Francis, British jockey-turned-novelist (d. 2010)
  - Fritz Walter, German footballer (d. 2002)

=== November ===
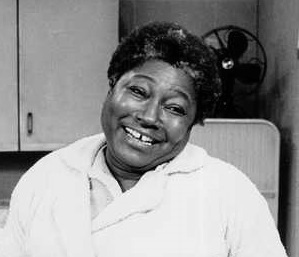
Esther Rolle

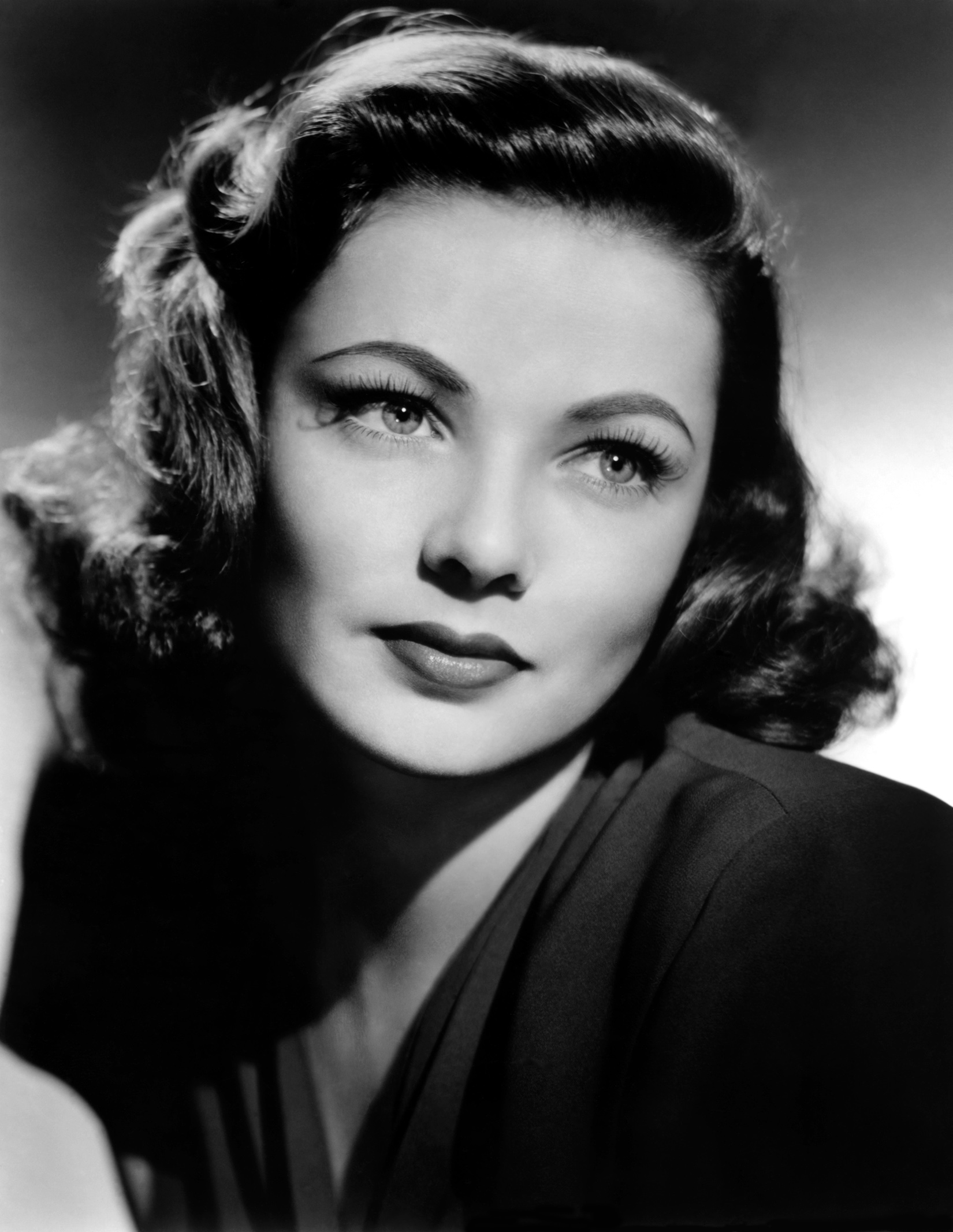
Gene Tierney

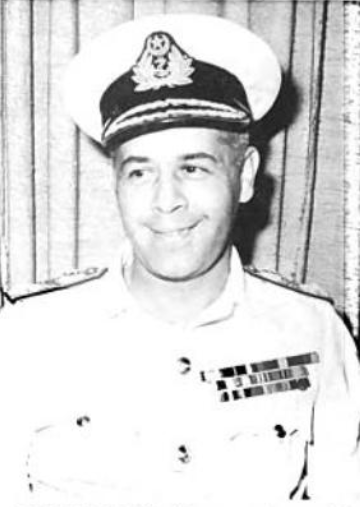
S. M. Ahsan

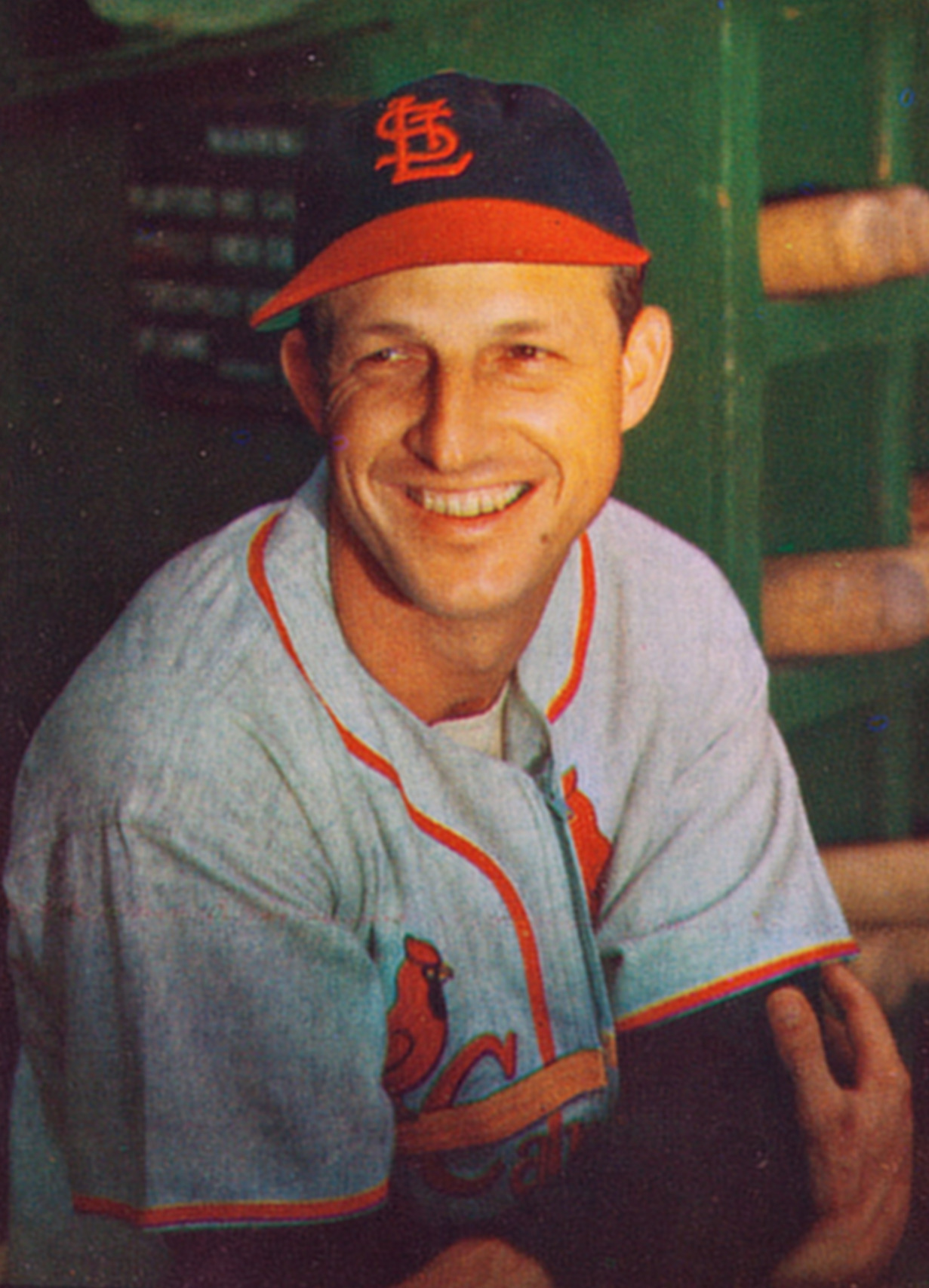
Stan Musial

- November 2 – Kim Chol-man, North Korean politician and military official (d. 2018)
- November 3 – Oodgeroo Noonuccal, Australian political activist, artist, and educator (d. 1993)
- November 4 – Val Heim, American Major League Baseball player (d. 2019)
- November 5
  - John H. Land, American politician, mayor of Apopka, Florida (d. 2014)
  - Douglass North, American economist (d. 2015)
- November 8
  - Sitara Devi, Indian dancer (d. 2014)
  - Esther Rolle, American actress (d. 1998)
  - Wally Westlake, American Major League Baseball player (d. 2019)
- November 11
  - Paul Ignatius, American government official (d. 2025)
  - Walter Krupinski, German World War II fighter ace, postwar general (d. 2000)
- November 12 – Josip Boljkovac, Croatian politician (d. 2014)
- November 13
  - Jack Elam, American actor (d. 2003)
  - Georg Olden, African American graphic designer (d. 1975)
  - Stanley M. Truhlsen, American ophthalmologist (d. 2021)
- November 14 – Mary Greyeyes, first First Nations woman to join the Canadian Armed Forces (d. 2011)
- November 15 – Wayne Thiebaud, American painter (d. 2021)
- November 16
  - Eric P. Hamp, American linguist (d. 2019)
  - José Lewgoy, Brazilian actor (d. 2003)
- November 18 – Mustafa Khalil, 40th prime minister of Egypt (d. 2008)
- November 19 – Gene Tierney, American actress (d. 1991)
- November 21
  - S. M. Ahsan, Pakistani Vice Admiral, Naval Commander, and recipient of the Distinguished Service Cross for his role in World War II (d. 1989)
  - Ralph Meeker, American actor (d. 1988)
  - Stan Musial, American baseball player (d. 2013)
- November 22
  - Anne Crawford, British actress (d. 1956)
  - Baidyanath Misra, Indian economist (d. 2019)
- November 23
  - Paul Celan, German-language Romanian poet (d. 1970)
  - Paik Sun-yup, South Korean military officer (d. 2020)
- November 24 – Jorge Mistral, Spanish-Mexican actor (d. 1972)
- November 25
  - Noel Neill, American actress (d. 2016)
  - Ricardo Montalbán, Mexican actor (d. 2009)
  - Putra of Perlis, Yang di-Pertuan Agong of Malaysia (d. 2000)
- November 27 – Buster Merryfield, British actor (d. 1999)
- November 28 – Patrick Rodger, Scottish Anglican bishop (d. 2002)
- November 29
  - Bob Wolff, American sportscaster (d. 2017)
  - Yegor Ligachyov, Soviet and Russian politician (d. 2021)
- November 30 – Virginia Mayo, American actress (d. 2005)

=== December ===
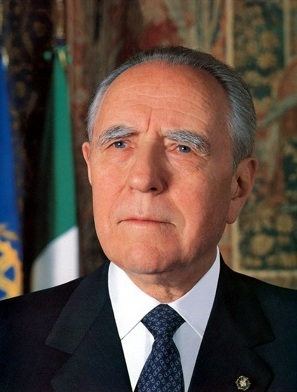
Carlo Azeglio Ciampi

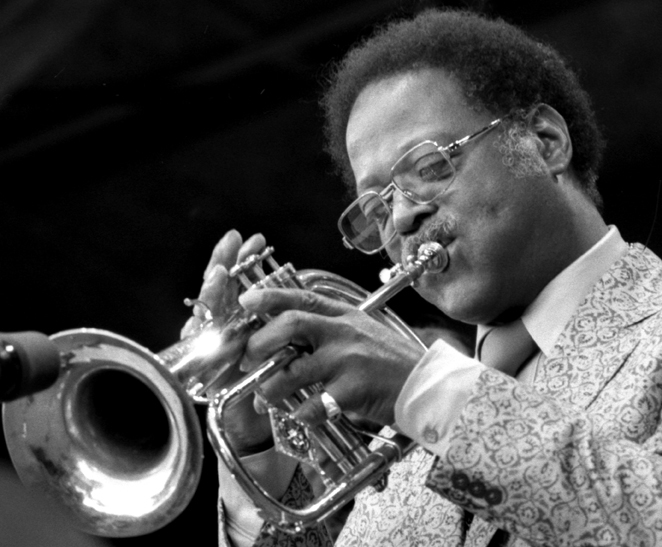
Clark Terry

- December 1
  - Peter Baptist Tadamaro Ishigami, Japanese Roman Catholic prelate (d. 2014)
  - Lê Đức Anh, 4th president of Vietnam (d. 2019)
- December 5 – Poldine Carlo, American author (d. 2018)
- December 6
  - Dave Brubeck, American jazz pianist and composer (d. 2012)
  - George Porter, English chemist, Nobel Prize laureate (d. 2002)
- December 8 – Ivar Martinsen, Norwegian speed skater (d. 2018)
- December 9 – Carlo Azeglio Ciampi, 49th prime minister of Italy, 10th president of Italy (d. 2016)
- December 10 – Stanko Todorov, Bulgarian communist politician (d. 1996)
- December 12
  - Jorge Dória, Brazilian actor and humorist (d. 2013)
  - Margot Duhalde, Chilean pilot (d. 2018)
- December 13
  - Kaysone Phomvihane, 2nd president, 11th prime minister of Laos (d. 1992)
  - George P. Shultz, American economist, politician and 60th United States secretary of state (d. 2021)
- December 14
  - Frank T. Cary, American executive, businessman (d. 2006)
  - Clark Terry, American jazz musician and composer (d. 2015)
- December 15
  - Bernice Falk Haydu, American aviator (d. 2021)
  - Eddie Robinson, American Major League Baseball player (d. 2021)
- December 16 – John Hale Stutesman, American public official (d. 2019)
- December 17 – Ewa Paradies, German Nazi war criminal (d. 1946)
- December 18
  - Franca Pilla, former Italian First Lady
  - Gianni Di Venanzo, Italian cinematographer (d. 1966)
- December 19
  - Trygve Brudevold, Norwegian bobsledder (d. 2021)
  - Little Jimmy Dickens, American country music singer-songwriter (d. 2015)
  - David Susskind, American producer, talk show host (d. 1987)
- December 20 – Väinö Linna, Finnish author (d. 1992)
- December 21
  - Alicia Alonso, Cuban ballerina (d. 2019)
  - Iris Cummings, American Olympic swimmer and aviator (d. 2025)
  - Adele Goldstine, American mathematician (d. 1964)
  - Harold Lang, American dancer and actor (d. 1985)
  - J. Roderick MacArthur, American businessman, philanthropist (d. 1984)
  - Édith Mourier, French mathematician, specialising in probability theory (d. 2017)
- December 22 – Robin Dalton, Australian literary agent and film producer (d. 2022)
- December 23 – Tim Elkington, English Royal Air Force pilot (d. 2019)
- December 24 – Edy Reinalter, Swiss alpine skier (d. 1962)
- December 28 – Princess Antoinette, Baroness of Massy (d. 2011)
- December 29
  - Josefa Iloilo, 3rd president of Fiji (d. 2011)
  - Viveca Lindfors, Swedish-American actress (d. 1995)
- December 30 – Jack Lord, American actor (d. 1998)
- December 31 – Rex Allen, American actor, singer and songwriter (d. 1999)

=== Date unknown ===
- Emilia "Mimi" Jennewein, American painter (d. 2006)

== Deaths ==
=== January ===
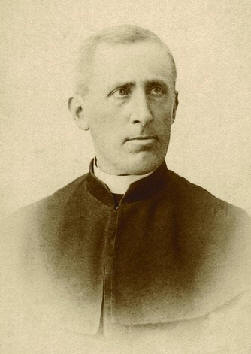
Saint Zygmunt Gorazdowski

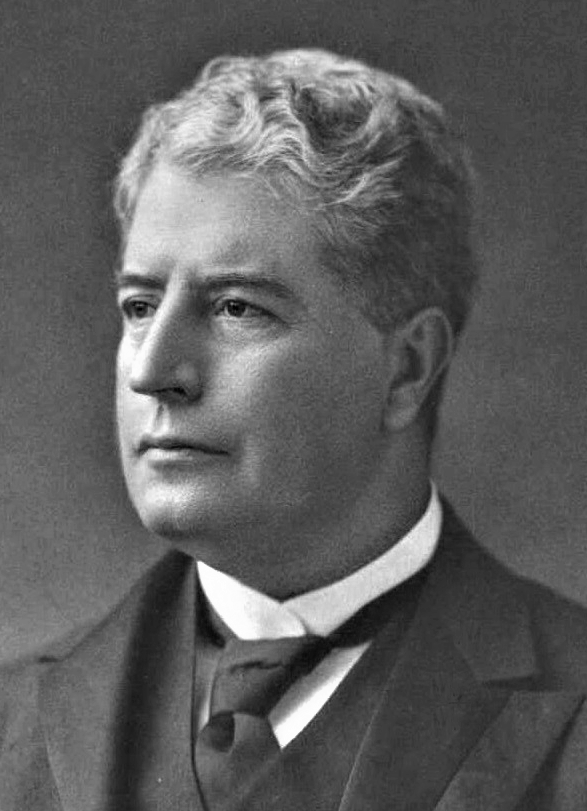
Edmund Barton

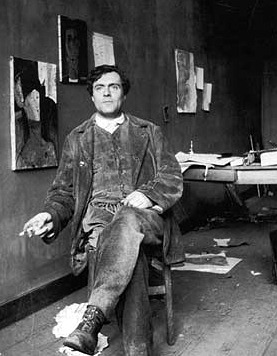
Amedeo Modigliani

- January 1
  - Zygmunt Gorazdowski, Polish Roman Catholic priest and saint (b. 1845)
  - Paul Adam, French Symbolist writer (b. 1862)
- January 3 – Zygmunt Janiszewski, Polish mathematician; Spanish flu (b. 1888)
- January 4
  - Manuel de la Cámara, Spanish admiral (b. 1835)
  - Benito Pérez Galdós, Spanish novelist (b. 1843)
- January 6
  - Heinrich Lammasch, Austrian statesman, last minister-president of Austria (as part of the Austro-Hungarian Empire) in 1918 (b. 1853)
  - Walter Cunliffe, 1st Baron Cunliffe, English banker (b. 1856)
  - Hieronymus Georg Zeuthen, Danish mathematician (b. 1839)
- January 7 – Sir Edmund Barton, 1st prime minister of Australia (b. 1849)
- January 9 – Mikhail Bakhirev, Russian admiral; executed (b. 1868)
- January 11 – Kataoka Shichirō, Japanese admiral (b. 1854)
- January 14 – John Francis Dodge, American automobile manufacturer; Spanish flu (b. 1864)
- January 20 – Georg Lurich, Estonian Greco-Roman wrestler, strongman (b. 1876)
- January 24
  - William Percy French, Irish songwriter and entertainer (b. 1854)
  - Amedeo Modigliani, Italian painter, sculptor; tuberculosis (b. 1884)

=== February ===
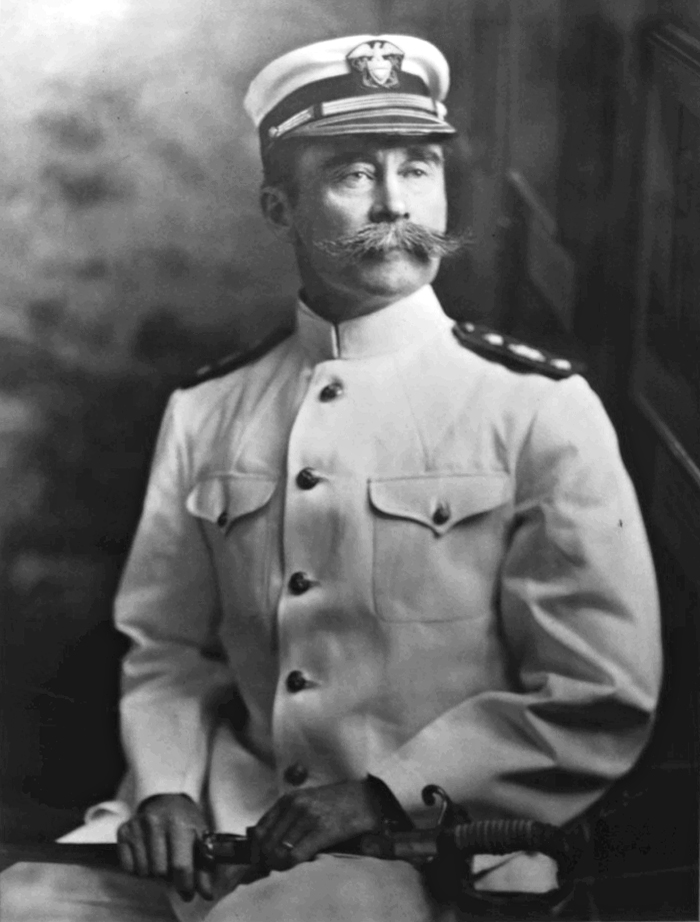
Robert Peary

- February 2 – Field Eugene Kindley, American World War I aviator (b. 1896)
- February 3 – Frank Brown, 42nd governor of Maryland (b. 1846)
- February 7
  - Alexander Kolchak, Russian naval commander; executed (b. 1874)
  - Viktor Pepelyayev, Russian politician; executed (b. 1874)
- February 9 – Friedrich von Beck-Rzikowsky, Austrian general (b. 1830)
- February 11 – Gaby Deslys, French dancer, actress and spy; Spanish flu (b. 1881)
- February 13 – João Maria Correia Ayres de Campos, 1st Count of Ameal, Portuguese politician and antiquarian (b. 1847)
- February 15
  - Aleksander Aberg, Estonian professional wrestler, strongman (b. 1881)
  - Joseph Burton Sumner, American founder of Sumner, Mississippi (b. 1837)
- February 16 – Augustus F. Goodridge, Canadian merchant and politician (b. 1839)
- February 17 – Eduard von Knorr, German admiral (b. 1840)
- February 20
  - Robert Peary, American Arctic explorer (b. 1856)
  - Jacinta Marto, Portuguese saint; Spanish flu (b. 1910)
- February 21 – Afonso, Duke of Porto (b. 1865)
- February 27 – William Sherman Jennings, Governor of Florida (b. 1863)

=== March ===
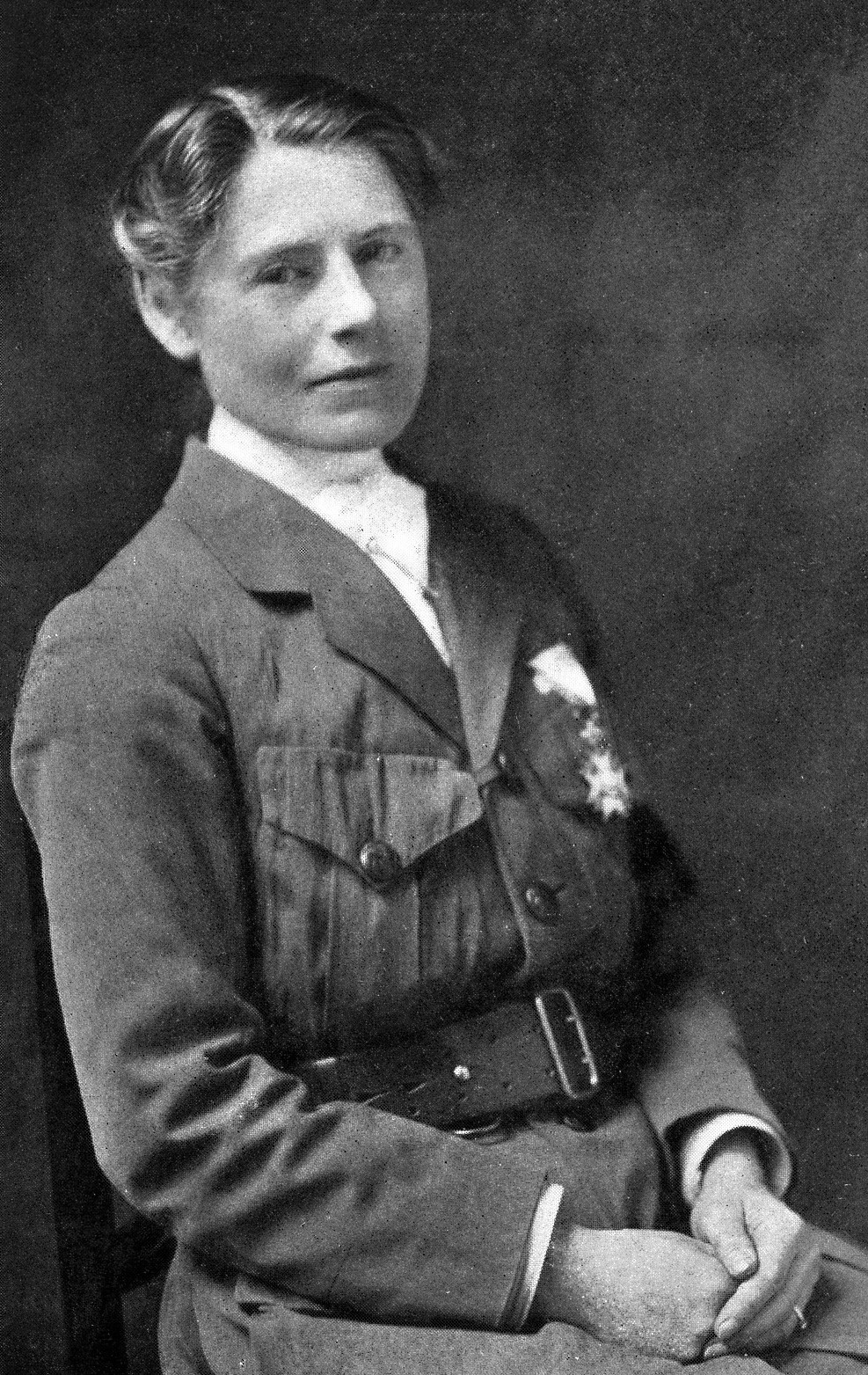
Evelina Haverfield

- March 1
  - John H. Bankhead, U.S. senator from Alabama (b. 1842)
  - William A. Stone, Governor of Pennsylvania (b. 1846)
  - Joseph Trumpeldor, Russian Zionist (b. 1880)
- March 4 – Roswell P. Bishop, U.S. congressman from Michigan (b. 1843)
- March 7 – Jaan Poska, Estonian barrister, politician (b. 1866)
- March 11 – Julio Garavito Armero, Colombian astronomer (b. 1865)
- March 14 – Nikolai Korotkov, Russian surgeon (b. 1874)
- March 15 – Rudolf Berthold, German World War I fighter ace (b. 1891)
- March 21 – Evelina Haverfield, British suffragette (b. 1867)
- March 24 – Mary Augusta Ward, Tasmanian novelist (b. 1851)
- March 26
  - William Chester Minor, American surgeon (b. 1834)
  - William Thomas Smedley, American artist (b. 1858)
- March 31
  - Paul Bachmann, German mathematician (b. 1837)
  - Abdul Hamid Madarshahi, Bengali Islamic scholar and author (b. 1869)
  - Lothar von Trotha, German military commander (b. 1848)
  - Edwin Warfield, Governor of Maryland (b. 1848)

=== April ===
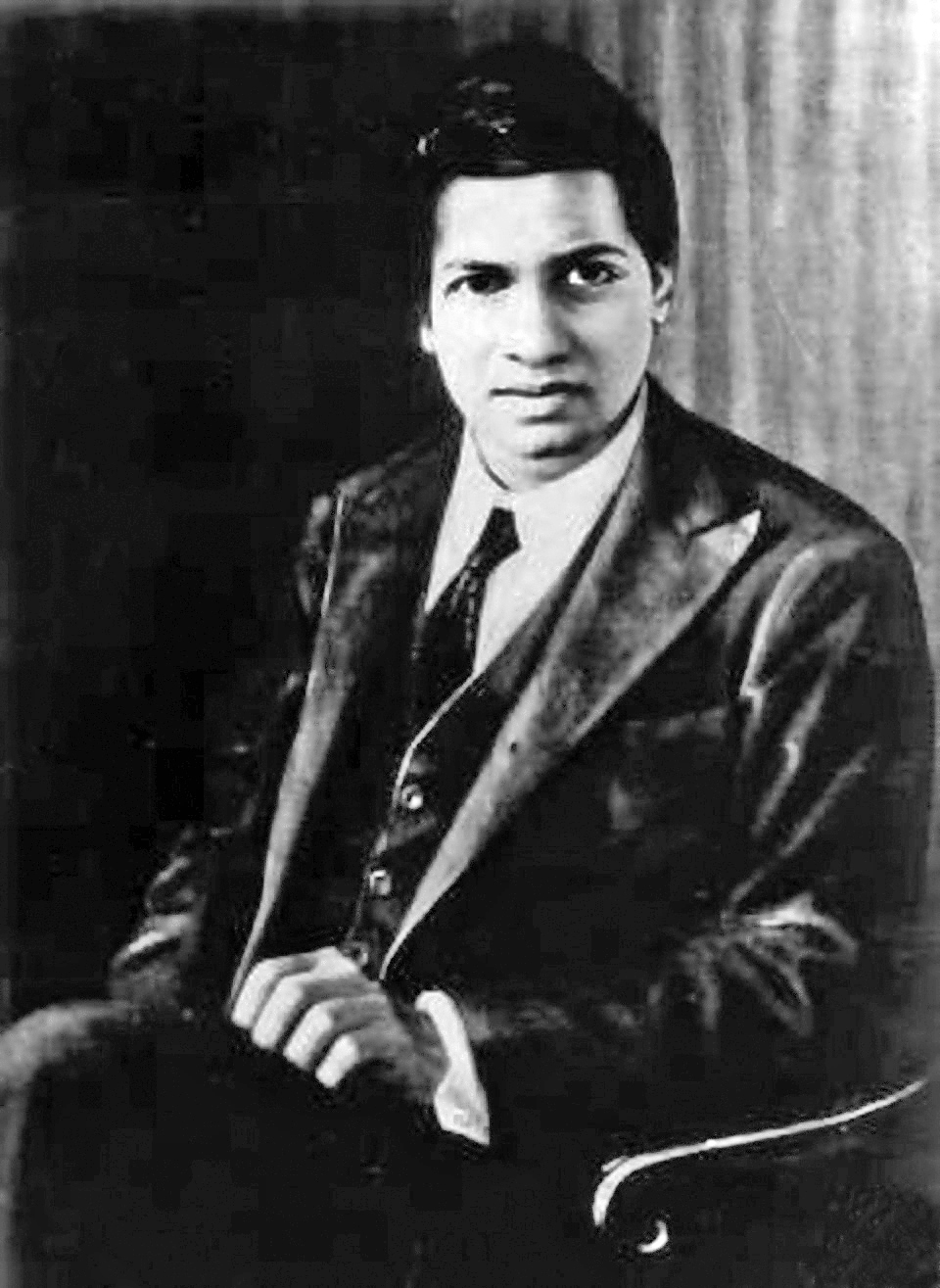
Srinivasa Ramanujan

- April 1 – Walter Simon, German philanthropist (b. 1857)
- April 8
  - John Brashear, American astronomer (b. 1840)
  - Charles Tomlinson Griffes, American composer (b. 1884), Spanish flu
- April 10 – Moritz Cantor, German mathematical historian (b. 1829)
- April 12 – Walter Edwards, American film director (b. 1870)
- April 21 – Maria Sanford, American educator (b. 1836)
- April 26 – Srinivasa Ramanujan, Indian mathematician (b. 1887)

=== May ===
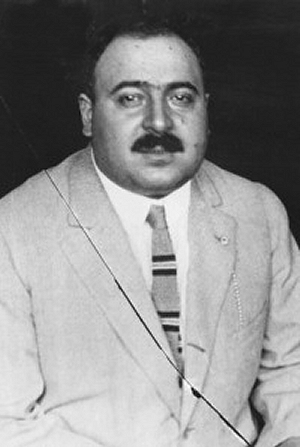
James Colosimo

- May 1 – Princess Margaret of Connaught, Crown Princess of Sweden (b. 1882)
- May 4 – Mary Catherine Crowley, American author (b. 1856)
- May 8 – Johan Reinhold Sahlberg, Finnish entomologist (b. 1845)
- May 10 – John Wesley Hyatt, American inventor (b. 1837)
- May 11
  - Big Jim Colosimo, Italian-born American gangster (b. 1878)
  - William Dean Howells, American writer (b. 1837), Spanish flu
- May 16
  - Joselito, Spanish bullfighter (b. 1895)
  - Levi P. Morton, 22nd Vice President of the United States (b. 1824)
  - Maria Bochkareva, Russian White soldier (b. 1889)
- May 18 – Curry Cabral, Portuguese physician and professor (b. 1844)
- May 21
  - Venustiano Carranza, President of Mexico (b. 1859)
  - Eleanor H. Porter, American novelist (b. 1868)
- May 23 – Svetozar Boroević, Austro-Hungarian field marshal (b. 1856)
- May 28 – Hardwicke Rawnsley, English clergyman, poet, writer of hymns and conservationist (b. 1851)
- May 30
  - Mirza Muhammad Yusuf Ali, Bengali writer and social activist (b. 1858)
  - George Ernest Morrison, Australian adventurer (b. 1862)

=== June ===
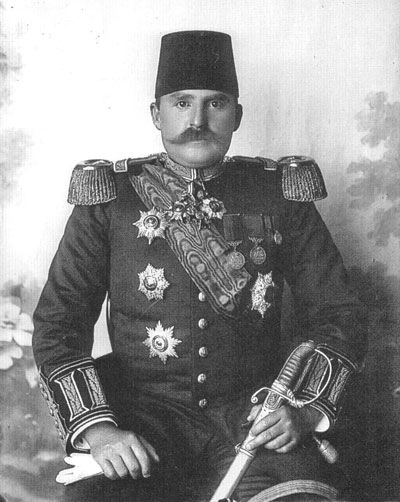
Essad Pasha

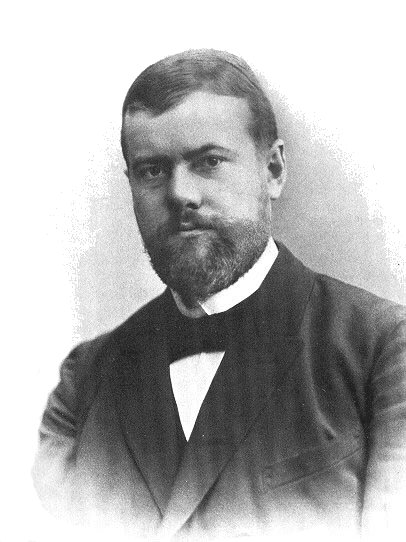
Max Weber

- June 2 – Francisco Plancarte y Navarrete, Mexican archaeologist and Archbishop of Roman Catholic Archdiocese of Monterrey (b. 1856)
- June 6 – James Dunsmuir, Canadian politician (b. 1851)
- June 13 – Essad Pasha Toptani, Prime Minister of Albania (b. 1863)
- June 14
  - Ella Eaton Kellogg, American dietetician (b. 1853)
  - Anna Maria Mozzoni, Italian feminist (b. 1837)
  - Gabrielle Réjane, French actress (b. 1856); Spanish flu
  - Max Weber, German political economist (b. 1864); Spanish flu
- June 18
  - Jewett W. Adams, Governor of Nevada (b. 1835)
  - John Macoun, Irish-born Canadian naturalist (b. 1831)
- June 20
  - Marie-Adolphe Carnot, French chemist, mining engineer and politician (b. 1839)
  - John Grigg, New Zealand astronomer (b. 1838)
- June 27 – Adolphe-Basile Routhier, Canadian judge, author and lyricist (b. 1839)

=== July ===
- July 1 – Delfim Moreira, 10th president of Brazil (b. 1868)
- July 2 – William Louis Marshall, American general, engineer (b. 1846)
- July 3 – William C. Gorgas, American Army surgeon (b. 1854)
- July 5 – Max Klinger, German painter and sculptor (b. 1857)
- July 7 – Roberto Silva Renard, Chilean general (b. 1855)
- July 10 – John Fisher, 1st Baron Fisher, British admiral (b. 1841)
- July 11 – Empress Eugénie of France (b. 1826)
- July 17
  - Charles E. Courtney, American rower, rowing coach (b. 1849)
  - Sir Edmund Elton, 8th Baronet, English potter (b. 1846)
- July 18 – Prince Joachim of Prussia (b. 1890)
- July 20 – Sarada Devi, Indian mystic and saint (b. 1853)
- July 22 – William Kissam Vanderbilt, American heir (b. 1849)

=== August ===
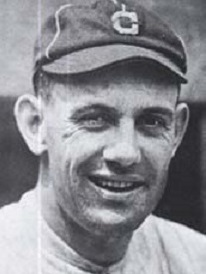
Ray Chapman

- August 1
  - Frank Hanly, Governor of Indiana (b. 1863)
  - Bal Gangadhar Tilak, Indian nationalist (b. 1856)
- August 2 – Ormer Locklear, American stunt pilot, film actor (b. 1891)
- August 6 – Remus von Woyrsch, German field marshal (b. 1847)
- August 8 – Eduard Birnbaum, Polish-born German cantor (b. 1855)
- August 9 – Sir Samuel Griffith, Australian politician and judge (b. 1845)
- August 10
  - Clara Lachmann, Danish-Swedish patron of the arts (b. 1864)
  - James O'Neill, American actor (b. 1847)
  - Ádám Politzer, Austrian otologist (b. 1835)
- August 12 – Hermann Struve, Russian-born astronomer (b. 1854)
- August 16
  - Henry Daglish, Premier of Western Australia (b. 1866)
  - Sir Norman Lockyer, English astronomer (b. 1836)
- August 17 – Ray Chapman, American baseball player (b. 1891)
- August 21 – Paul W. Abt, American businessman and politician (b. 1845)
- August 22 – Anders Zorn, Swedish painter (b. 1860)
- August 26 – James Wilson, Scottish-born American politician (b. 1835)
- August 31 – Wilhelm Wundt, German physiologist, psychologist (b. 1832)

=== September ===
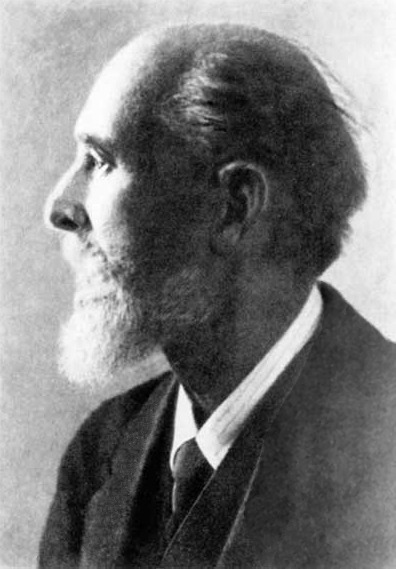
Peter Carl Fabergé

- September 7 – Simon-Napoléon Parent, Premier of Quebec (b. 1855)
- September 8 – Harmon Northrop Morse, American chemist (b. 1848)
- September 10 – Olive Thomas, American actress (b. 1894)
- September 18 – Robert Beaven, Canadian politician (b. 1836)
- September 24 – Peter Carl Fabergé, Russian jeweler (b. 1846)
- September 25 – Jacob Schiff, German-born banker, philanthropist (b. 1847)
- September 30 – Sir William Wilfred Sullivan, Canadian journalist, politician and jurist (b. 1843)

=== October ===
- October 2
  - Max Bruch, German composer (b. 1838)
  - Winthrop M. Crane, Governor of Massachusetts and Senator (b. 1853)
- October 5 – William Heinemann, English publisher (b. 1863)
- October 7 – Yves Delage, French zoologist (b. 1854)
- October 10 – Hudson Stuck, English mountaineer (b. 1865)
- October 17
  - Reginald Farrer, English botanist (b. 1880)
  - John Reed, American journalist (b. 1887)
- October 24 – Grand Duchess Maria Alexandrovna of Russia (b. 1853)
- October 25 – Alexander of Greece, Greek king (b. 1893)
- October 27 – Agda Montelius, Swedish feminist (b. 1850)

=== November ===
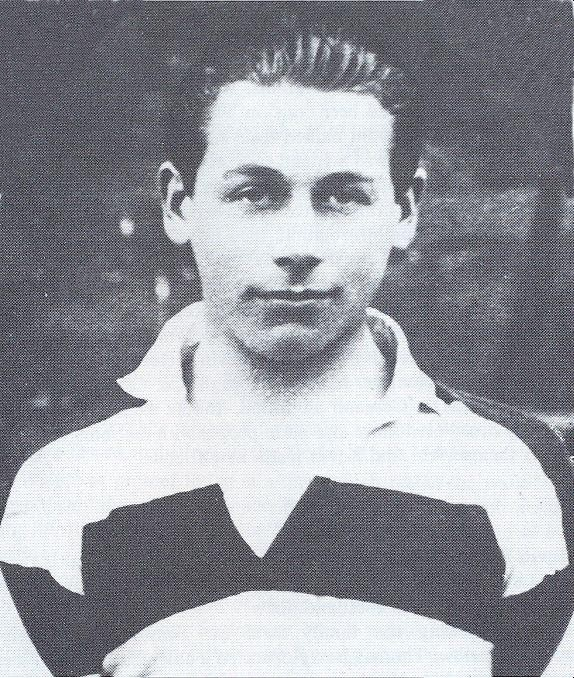
Kevin Barry

- November 1 – Kevin Barry, Irish republican paramilitary; executed (b. 1902)
- November 2
  - James Daly, Irish mutineer; executed (b. 1899)
  - Louise Imogen Guiney, American poet and essayist (b. 1861)
- November 3 – Warren Terhune, United States Navy Commander and 13th governor of American Samoa (b. 1869)
- November 4 – Ludwig Struve, Russian astronomer (b. 1858)
- November 21 – Michael Hogan, Irish footballer and activist, one of 14 civilians killed in the Croke Park massacre by British paramilitary forces (b. 1896)
- November 23 – Sir George Callaghan, British admiral (b. 1852)
- November 25
  - Gaston Chevrolet, Swiss-born racing driver and manufacturer (b. 1892)
  - Madeline McDowell Breckinridge, American leader of the women's suffrage movement, one of Kentucky's leading progressive reformers (b. 1872)
- November 27 – Alexius Meinong, Austrian philosopher (b. 1853)
- November 30 – Eugene W. Chafin, American politician (b. 1852)

=== December ===
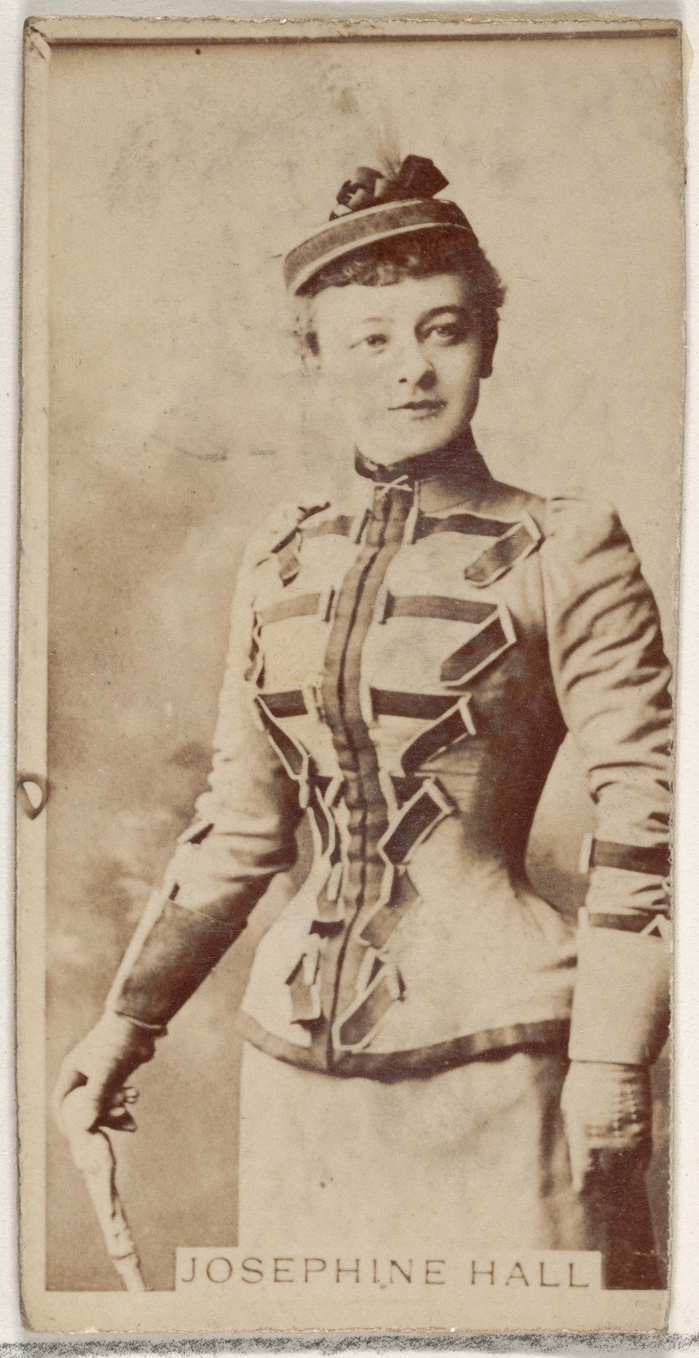
Josephine Hall

- December 5 – Josephine Hall, American actress and soprano (b. 1865)
- December 11 – Olive Schreiner, South African writer (b. 1855)
- December 12 – Edward Gawler Prior, Canadian mining engineer and politician (b. 1854)
- December 14 – George Gipp, American football player (b. 1895)
- December 23 – Cayetano Arellano, first Chief Justice of the Supreme Court of the Philippines under the American Civil Government (b. 1847)
- Unknown date – Nikolai Pavlovich Bobyr, Russian general; executed (b. 1854)

=== Date unknown ===
- Alimuddin Ahmad, Bengali revolutionary and activist (b. 1884)
- Vladimir Viktorovich Sakharov, Russian general (executed) (b. 1853)

== Nobel Prizes ==

- Physics – Charles Édouard Guillaume
- Chemistry – Walther Nernst
- Medicine – Schack August Steenberg Krogh
- Literature – Knut Hamsun
- Peace – Léon Victor Auguste Bourgeois
