= Alt (surname) =

Alt is a surname. Notable people with the surname include:

- Albrecht Alt (1883–1956), German bible scholar and Protestant theologian
- Carol Alt (born 1960), American model and actress
- Denis Alt (born 1980), German politician
- Don Alt (1916–1988), American politician and businessman
- Ernst Alt, German Roman Catholic priest and exorcist
- Helmut Alt, German computer scientist
- Franz Alt (mathematician) (1910–2011), Austrian-born American mathematician
- Franz Alt (painter) (1821–1914), Austrian painter, brother of Rudolf
- J. Kenji López-Alt, American chef and food writer
- Jakob Alt (1789–1872), Austrian painter, father of painters Franz and Rudolf
- Joe Alt (born 2003), American football player
- John Alt (born 1962), German-American football player
- Mark Alt (born 1991), American ice hockey player
- Renata Alt (born 1965), German politician
- Rudolf von Alt (1812–1905), Austrian painter
- Salome Alt (1568–1633), Austrian wife of Wolf Dietrich (von) Raitenau
- Susanne Alt (born 1978), German female saxophonist

== See also ==
- Alt (disambiguation)
- Ant (name)
