= Abt (surname) =

- Language: Dutch, German

Origin
- Language: Old Saxon or Middle Dutch
- Origin: abt
- Meaning: "abbot"

Other names
- Variant form: Abts

Abt is an occupational surname of Dutch and German origin derived from the clerical title of abbot. Notable people with the surname include:

== Arts and entertainment ==
- Franz Abt (1819–1885), German composer
- Karl Friedrich Abt (1733–1783), German actor

== Politicians ==
- John Abt (1904–1991), American CPUSA lawyer and New Deal politician
- Paul W. Abt (1845–1920), American businessman and politician

== Science, engineering and research ==
- Carl Roman Abt (1850–1933), Swiss mechanical engineer who invented the Abt rack system for rack railways
- Clark C. Abt (born 1929), American game researcher
- Thomas Abt (born 1972), American policy analyst
- Helmut Abt (1925–2024), American astrophysicist

== Sport ==
- Alexander Abt (born 1976), Russian figure skater and coach
- Christian Abt (born 1967), German racing driver
- Daniel Abt (born 1992), German racing driver
- Gudrun Abt (born 1962), German athlete
- Hans-Jürgen Abt, German race team manager
- Samuel Abt (1934–2025), American sports journalist and author

== See also ==
- Abt (disambiguation)
- Ant (name)
