= Ant (name) =

Ant is an English nickname abbreviated from the given name Anthony/Antony in use throughout North America, Guyana and English-speaking countries in Europe, Africa, Asia and Oceania. It is also a stage name, given name and a surname.

== Stage name ==
- Ant (comedian), stage name of Anthony Steven Kalloniatis (born 1967), American stand-up comedian and actor
- Ant (producer), stage name of Anthony Davis (born 1970), American record producer and member of Rhymesayers
- ANT, solo performance name of Antony Harding (fl. c. 2000), British musician
- Anthony McPartlin (born 1975), an English television presenter, one half of the duo Ant & Dec
- Ant-Bee, stage name of Billy James (born 1960), American musician and writer
- ASAP Ant, A$AP Mob rap collective member
- Ant Trip Ceremony, 1960s band name
- Ant Lady, ring name of Syuri.

== Nickname ==
- Ant Anstead, nickname of Anthony Richard Anstead (born 1979), English television presenter, motor specialist, car builder, designer and artist
- Ant Banks, nickname of Anthony Banks (born 1969), American producer and rapper
- Ant Botha, nickname of Anthony Greyvensteyn Botha (born 1976), South African cricketer
- Ant Clemons, nickname of Anthony Clemons Jr. (born 1991), American singer-songwriter
- Ant Henson, nickname of Anthony Mark Henson (born 1989), British singer-songwriter
- Ant Middleton, nickname of Anthony Middleton (born 1980), English television presenter
- Ant Neely (born 1923), nickname of Antony Neely, English composer and musician
- Ant Pedersen, nickname of Anthony Pedersen (born 1988), New Zealander racing driver
- Ant Strachan, nickname of Anthony Duncan Strachan (born 1966), New Zealander rugby union player
- Ant Whiting, nickname of Anthony Whiting, British songwriter, instrumentalist, and producer
- Ant Whorton-Eales, nickname of Anthony Whorton-Eales (born 1994), British racing driver
- Anthony Edwards (born 2001), American basketball player nicknamed "Ant"
- Anthony Phillips (born 1951), British guitarist for the band Genesis, nicknamed "Ant"
- Anthony Spilotro (1938–1986), American mobster nicknamed "The Ant"
- Anthony West (motorcyclist) (born 1981), Australian motorcycle road racer, nicknamed "Ant"

== Given name ==
- Ant Gyi (1923–2017), Burmese singer and musician
- Ant Sang (born 1970), New Zealander comic book artist and designer
- Ant Simpson, Australian entertainer
- Ant Timpson (born 1966), New Zealander producer
- Ant Wan (fl 2018–present), Swedish rapper

== Surname ==
- Adam Ant (born Stuart Leslie Goddard in 1954), English singer and musician
- Clara Ant (born 1948), Bolivian architect and political activist
- George Ant, Greek music video director

== Fictional characters ==
- Ant (character), Image comics character
- Ant (DC Comics), DC Comics superhero
- Ant, WordWorld show character
- Ant, Ant and Bee series character
- Atom Ant, Hanna-Barbera cartoon superhero
- Ant-Man, various Marvel Comics superheroes
- Pants Ant, book and cartoon character
- Charlie Ant, United Artist The Ant and the Aardvark series character
- Anthony Ant, protagonist of Anthony Ant animated United States/Canada/United Kingdom TV series that takes place in "Antville"
- Ant Jones, character from Grange Hill
- Ant Richards, character from Shortland Street
- Ant Tenna, character from Deltarune

== See also ==
- Ant (disambiguation)
- Tracy Williams (fl. 2009–present), American professional wrestler with stage names Green Ant and Silver Ant
- Drew Gulak (born 1987), American professional wrestler who has used the stage name Soldier Ant
- Abt (surname)
- Alt (surname)
- An (surname)
- Ana (given name)
- Anat (disambiguation)
- ANC (disambiguation)
- And (disambiguation)
- Anet (disambiguation)
- Ang (surname)
- Ani (given name)
- Ani (surname)
- Ans (given name)
- Ante (name), also derived from Antonius
- Anth (name), also derived from Antonius
- Anto (name), also derived from Antonius
- Ants (given name)
- Anu (name)
- Art (given name)
- ATN (disambiguation)
