= Ans =

Ans or ANS or variation, may refer to:

== Places ==
- Ans, Belgium, a municipality in Belgium
- Ans, Denmark, a village in Denmark
- Angus, Scotland, UK; a council area by its Chapman code
- Ainsdale railway station, England, UK (by station code ANS)
- Andahuaylas Airport, Peru (by IATA airport code ANS)

== People ==
- Ans (given name), a Dutch feminine given name
- Anna Nicole Smith, American model and actress

== Organizations ==
- Academy of Natural Sciences of Philadelphia, Pennsylvania, United States
- American Name Society
- American Nuclear Society
- American Numismatic Society, formerly the American Numismatic and Archaeological Society
- ANS Group of Companies, a news organization in Azerbaijan
- Armée Nationale Sihanoukiste, a Cambodian resistance group; see Coalition Government of Democratic Kampuchea
- Audubon Naturalist Society, an American environmental organization

== Chemistry and biology ==
- Adrenergic nervous system, adrenaline and noradrenaline neurotransmitters distribution in human body
- 8-Anilinonaphthalene-1-sulfonic acid, a fluorescent chemical compound used as a molecular probe
- Anthocyanidin synthase, an enzyme in the leucocyanidin biosynthesis pathway
- Approximate number system, a hypothesized physiological basis for the sense of number
- Autonomic nervous system, part of the peripheral nervous system in the body
- L-Aspartate-nitro-succinate pathway for production of nitrite

== Technology ==
- .ans, an unofficial file extension for ANSI art
- Advanced Network and Services, a non-profit network service provider in the 1990s
- American National Standards, defined by the American National Standards Institute
- ans, a variable in calculators referring to the most recent answer
- ANS carriage control characters (or ASA control characters), for computer line printers
- Asymmetric numeral systems, coding in data compression
- Authoritative name server, a DNS server
- Artificial neural system, or Artificial neural network
- Air Navigation Services, as delivered by an Air Navigation Service Provider (ANSP)
- Apple Network Server, a late 1990s AIX based server machine from Apple Inc.
- Astronomical Netherlands Satellite, a Dutch satellite

== Music ==
- ANS (album), a box set from the British band Coil
- ANS synthesizer, a Russian photoelectric musical instrument

== Other uses ==
- Al Ansar FC, a Lebanese association football club
- Amman National School, in Amman, Jordan
- Ansvarlig selskap, a Norwegian personal responsibility company model
- Algemeen Nijmeegs Studentenblad, a Dutch student magazine
- Akademia Nauk Stosowanych, a vocational university in Nowy Targ, Poland

== See also ==
- AN (disambiguation)
- Answer (disambiguation), for which "Ans." may be an abbreviation
