= ANC (disambiguation) =

ANC is the African National Congress, which became the ruling political party in South Africa in the 1994 election.

ANC may also refer to:

== Organizations ==
=== Companies ===
- Agilent Technologies, an American technology company
- ANC Sports, a sports marketing and signage company

=== Government and military organzitions ===
- Advisory Neighborhood Commission, Washington, D.C., US
- Armée Nationale Congolaise, the Congolese armed forces from 1960 to 1971
- Nurse Corps (United States Army) of the US Army
- Assemblea Nacional Catalana (Catalan National Assembly), in Catalonia, northeastern Spain

=== Political parties ===
- ANC, the African National Congress, in South Africa
- African National Congress (Zambia), a former political party in Zambia
- Alternative National Congress, a political party in Liberia
- Amani National Congress, a Kenyan political party
- Armenian National Congress, a coalition of political parties in Armenia

=== Other organizations ===
- ANC-Halfords Cycling Team, a British-based professional team
- Air Navigation Commission, part of the International Civil Aviation Organization
- The Association of Noise Consultants, a UK-based organisation of companies
- Australian Navy Cadets, a voluntary youth organisation

== Media ==
- All News Channel, a former American TV channel
- ABS-CBN News Channel, an English-language news TV channel for Filipino audiences
- Australian News Channel, parent company of many Australian cable news channels

== Places ==
- Ancaster railway station, UK, National Rail code
- Arlington National Cemetery, burial place of US Presidents William Howard Taft and John F. Kennedy; northern Virginia, US
- Ted Stevens Anchorage International Airport, Alaska, IATA airport code

== Science and technology ==
- Active noise control or active noise cancellation
- Absolute neutrophil count in blood
- Acid neutralizing capacity
- All-number calling for telephones

== Other uses ==
- American National Corpus, a text corpus of written and spoken American English
- Antenuptial Contract, as used in South Africa
- A Northern Chorus, a former band from Canada
- African Cup of Nations, or African Nations Cup, an international football tournament
- Arlington National Cemetery, one of two cemeteries of the US Army

== See also ==
- Ant (name)
