= Abt =

Abt or ABT may refer to:

== Organizations ==
- ABT (TV station), Hobart, Tasmania
- Abt Sportsline, German motor racing company
- Abt Electronics, US retailer
- Abbott Laboratories, NYSE symbol
- American Ballet Theatre, a classical ballet company in New York City, US
- Ansarullah Bengali Team, an Islamic extremist organization in Bangladesh
- Aryan Brotherhood of Texas, a white supremacist prison gang
- Association of Building Technicians, a former British trade union
- Autoridad de Fiscalización y Control Social de Bosques y Tierras (ABT), the Forest and Land Inspection and Social Control Authority, a Bolivian government agency

== Other uses ==
- Abt (surname)
- Abt rack system, Swiss rack systems for hauling trains up steep inclines
- 9423 Abt, a main-belt asteroid
- Abelam language, a Sepik language of Papua New Guinea
- Al-Baha Domestic Airport in Al-Bahah Province, Saudi Arabia (IATA airport code ABT)
- Alberta Standard Time, a timezone used in Alberta, Canada
- Analytical base table, a database table used for data analytics
- Availability-based tariff for electrical power in India
- Automatic ball trap, in clay pigeon shooting

== See also ==
- Abts, a surname
