= Annat =

Annat may refer to:

== In geography ==
- Annat, a settlement in the Highland region of Scotland
- Annat, a settlement in the Argyll and Bute region of Scotland

== See also ==
- Anat (disambiguation)
