= Alt =

Alt or ALT may refer to:

== Culture and sociology ==
- Alt account, an alternative online identity; when used deceptively, it is known as a sock puppet account
- Alternate character, in role-playing games
- Alternative lifestyle, behavior outside the cultural norm
- Alternative or youth subculture, including "alt fashion" and "alt aesthetics"
- alt.* hierarchy, the main set of USENET newsgroups that were not distributed by default
- Alt-right, an abbreviation of alternative right, a loosely connected far-right, white nationalist movement based largely in the United States

=== Arts and media ===
- André Leon Talley (1948–2022), fashion journalist, stylist, and creative director
- Alt (film), a 2013 Venezuelan 6-minute science-fiction movie

==== Music ====
- Alternative rock, a music genre
- A.L.T. (born 1970), American Chicano rapper
- ALT (band) (c. 1995), consisting of Andy White, Liam Ó Maonlaí, and Tim Finn
- ALT (album), 2012, by Van der Graaf Generator
- ALT (EP), 2015, by Vanna
- Alt-J (formed 2007), English indie rock band
- Alt, alt dom, or altered dominant — see Glossary of music terminology § A
- In alt, singing in the octave above the treble staff (G_{5} to F_{6})
- ALT, a robotic singer with songs in the Bemani game series including Pop'n Music, Reflec Beat and Jubeat — see Dance Dance Revolution X3 vs. 2ndMix and Music of Dance Dance Revolution (2013–present)

=== Linguistics and education ===
- Southern Altai language (ISO-639-3 code "alt")
- Association for Linguistic Typology (founded 1995), a professional society for linguists
- Assistant Language Teacher, a job role in Japan
- Association for Learning Technology (founded 1993), a United Kingdom professional body and learned society

== Medicine ==
- Alanine aminotransferase, a enzyme of the transaminase family, primarily found in the liver
- Alternative Lengthening of Telomeres, a mechanism in cellular biology
- Argon laser trabeculoplasty, a type of glaucoma surgery

== Places and transportation ==
- Alt, Greater Manchester, formerly a civil parish of Limehurst Rural District, between Oldham and Ashton-under-Lyne, in Greater Manchester, England
- River Alt, in Merseyside, England
- Olt (river) (German: Alt), a river in Romania
- Altoona Transportation Center, Pennsylvania, U.S. (Amtrak code ALT)
- Altrincham station, in Greater Manchester, England (National Rail station code ALT)
- Altona railway station, in Melbourne, Victoria, Australia
- Altitude, vertical distance from a reference point
- Alternate route, a type of highway designation
- Approach and Landing Tests of the prototype Space Shuttle Enterprise in 1977
- Altimeter, short for altitude meter

== Engineering, technology, and mathematics ==
- Accelerated life testing, subjecting a product to extreme conditions to evaluate its weaknesses
- Alternator, a device that converts mechanical energy into alternating current
- Alt key, a modifier button on a computer keyboard
- ALT Linux, a set of Russian computer operating systems
- Alt attribute, the HTML feature for specifying alternative text in a webpage
- International Conference on Algorithmic Learning Theory, a theoretical computer science meeting
- Alternating group, a mathematical object related to even permutations

== Other uses ==
- Alt (surname)
- Aboriginal Land Trust, a type of organisation in Australia
- Altbier, a German style of beer
