= ATN (disambiguation) =

ATN is the Sydney flagship television station of the Seven Network in Australia.

ATN may also refer to:

== Medicine ==
- Acute tubular necrosis, a medical condition of the kidneys
- Asymmetrical tonic neck reflex
- Atypical trigeminal neuralgia

== Television ==
- ATN Filmnet, the early name of Dutch premium channel Filmnet
- Access Television Network, California, US
- Aotearoa Television Network, defunct Māori language television station from New Zealand
- Arabian Television Network, Dubai, United Arab Emirates
- Ariana Television Network, Kabul, Afghanistan
- Asia Television Network, the first independent television channel in India
- Asian Television Network, Canada
  - ATN Channel, Canada, owned by Asian Television Network

== Transportation ==
- Advanced transit network, another name for personal rapid transit
- Air Transport International, ICAO airline designator
- Anaheim Resort Transportation, or Anaheim Transportation Network
- Anniston station (Amtrak station code: ATN), Alabama, United States
- Arriva Trains Northern, a former train operator, England
- Atherton railway station, Greater Manchester, England (National Rail code)
- Australian Transport Network, a former freight railway operator in Australia
- Namatanai Airport, Papua New Guinea, IATA code

== Other ==
- Addicted to Noise, former online music magazine
- Aeronautical Telecommunication Network
- ATN International, a US telecommunications company
- Augmented transition network in linguistics
- Australian Technology Network, a network of universities in Australia

== See also ==
- Ant (name)
