= Research in Learning Technology =

- Discipline: Education
- Language: English
- Edited by: Michael Flavin, KCL, UK

Publication details
- Former name: ALT-J: Research in Learning Technology
- History: July 1993–present
- Publisher: Association for Learning Technology; Open Academia
- Frequency: Quarterly
- Open access: Yes

Standard abbreviations
- ISO 4: Res. Learn. Technol.

Indexing
- ISSN: 2156-7069 (print); 2156-7077 (web)

Links
- Journal homepage

Research in Learning Technology (RLT) is an open access peer-reviewed academic journal covering research in learning technology. The journal is currently known as Research in Learning Technology (since 2011), formerly known as ALT-J: Research in Learning Technology (1993–2010).

The current editor-in-chief is Michael Flavin, (King's College, London, UK). RLT is currently published by the Association for Learning Technology in partnership with Open Academia.

== History ==
The Journal of the Association for Learning Technology was established in July 1993 under the name ALT-J by the University of Wales Press.

From January 2004 until December 2011, RLT was published by Taylor & Francis. The journal changed its name from ALT-J - Research in Learning Technology to Research in Learning Technology - The Journal of the Association for Learning Technology in January 2011.

The journal increased its publication frequency from three times per year to four in January 2012.

The journal is now being published for the Association of Learning Technology by the Open Academia Publishing Services.

== Editors ==
The journal's current editors are on the RLT website. The journal's past editors have been:

- Lesley Diack (-2020),
- Lesley Gourlay,
- Frances Bell,
- Rhona Sharpe,
- Gabriel Jacobs,
- David Squires,
- Gráinne Conole,
- Martin Oliver, and
- Jane Seale.
