= Abt Global =

American research and consulting company

Abt Global (formerly known as Abt Associates) is a research, consulting and technology firm headquartered in the United States. In 1965, social scientist Clark Abt founded Abt Associates in Cambridge, Massachusetts. In 2024, the company rebranded as Abt Global. and acquired TSPi, a technology provider with expertise in digital solutions across the federal government.

An executive team leads Abt Global with Kathleen Flanagan as president and CEO since October 2009. Abt maintains offices in the United States and Australia.

Expertise includes:

- Digital solutions & Artificial Intelligence
- Research, Monitoring & Evaluation
- Technical Assistance & Implementation

== Notable people ==
- Kerry Healy
- Thomas Abt
- Ann-Marie Slaughter
- Douglas Elmendorf
