= Ans (given name) =

Ans is a Dutch feminine given name, a short form of either Anna or Johanna. People with the name include:

- Ans van den Berg (1873–1942), Dutch painter
- Ans Bouwmeester (fl. 1980s), Dutch Paralympic athlete
- Ans Dekker (born 1955), Dutch artistic gymnast
- Ans van Dijk (1905–1948), Dutch-Jewish collaborator with Nazi Germany
- Ans Dresden-Polak (1906–1943), Dutch-Jewish gymnast and holocaust victim
- Ans van Gerwen (born 1951), Dutch artistic gymnast
- Ans Gravesteijn (born 1951), Dutch rower
- Ans van Kemenade (born 1954), Dutch professor of English linguistics
- Ans Koning (1922–2006), Dutch javelin thrower
- Ans Luttge-Deetman (1867–1952), Dutch painter
- Ans Markus (born 1947), Dutch painter
- Ans Panhorst-Niesink (1918–2010), Dutch discus thrower and shot putter
- Ans Schut (1944–2025), Dutch speed skater
- Ans Timmermans (1919–1958), Dutch swimmer
- Ans Westra (1936–2023), Dutch-born New Zealand photographer
- Ans Wortel (1929–1996), Dutch painter, poet and writer
- Ans Woud, a pseudonym of Setske de Haan (1889–1948), Dutch children's writer

== See also ==
- Ans (disambiguation)
- Ant (name)
