= Molecular probe =

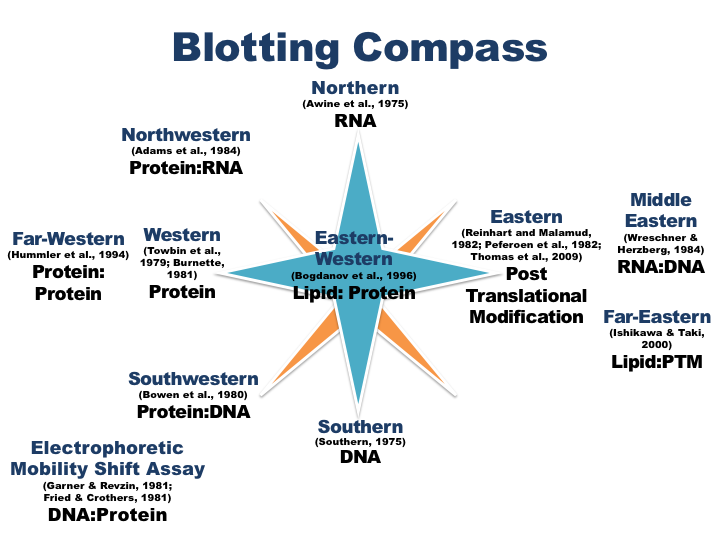
A compass of molecular probes

A molecular probe is a group of atoms or molecules used in molecular biology or chemistry to study the properties of other molecules or structures. If some measurable property of the molecular probe used changes when it interacts with the analyte (such as a change in absorbance), the interactions between the probe and the analyte can be studied. This makes it possible to indirectly study the properties of compounds and structures which may be hard to study directly.

The choice of molecular probe will depend on which compound or structure is being studied as well as on what property is of interest. Radioactive DNA or RNA sequences are used in molecular genetics to detect the presence of a complementary sequence by molecular hybridization.

== Common probes ==
- Digoxigenin
- ANS
- Porphyrin
- BODIPY
- Cyanine
- Hybridization probe

There are two main classes of antibodies

- Covalently bound probes, that bind to the target molecule
- Non-covalent probes that interact with the target protein through intramolecular interactions

Both classes of probes provide a secondary form of identification that indicate binding has successfully occurred, typically fluorescence. Molecular probes also often contain two components, a receptor that recognizes the target molecule, and a reporter/fluorophore that emits light upon excitation.

== Covalent molecular probes ==
The goal of covalently bound probes is to cause an irreversible covalent link to form between the probe and the target molecule, so that when the fluorophore is used to identify the molecule, it is physically attached to the target molecule. Proteins are a common target of molecular probes, and can either be targeted through specific amino acids, or through their active site.

For molecular probes that interact with the active site, what often occurs is the receptor portion of the probe is typically a ligand, with an electrophilic or nucleophilic functional group attached to the ligand that can then covalently bind to an amino acid in the active site, so that the fluorophore can be directly linked to the target protein. An example of this, Pablo Martin-Gago Et. Al designed a Woodward Reagent K probe, that reacts with a neighbouring glutamic acid in the active site of PDE6δ, after the ligand portion of the molecule bound to the Active site. This allows for the fluorophore attached to the probe to be identified by researchers, after successfully binding to the protein.

Another application of this is with photo-reactive molecules that can bind after being excited by light, which has been worked on by Dr. Michael Taylor's lab group at the University of Arizona. Pyridinium and Pyrimidinium salts are a pertinent example of this, as when they are activated by 427 nm light and 467 nm light respectively, they form a reactive fluorophore that then binds to the amino acid tryptophan.

== Non-covalent probes ==
The goal of non-covalent is to design a receptor that maximizes the amount of intramolecular reactions.

A class of probes that achieve this are “Alexa” probes. This class of probes contains hundreds of different antibodies that are designed to bind tightly to the target molecule or protein, allowing for further reactions to be conducted, or for attached fluorophores to be recognized through fluorescence detection at their specified wavelength.

== Identification of Molecules ==
The main purpose of these class of molecules is to perform secondary experiments after labeling in order to detect the levels of the targeted proteins, or to attach other functional groups to that molecule. This is used primarily in drug research, as if a given molecular probe allows for you to detect levels of a given protein, or to image the location of a protein, experiments can be conducted to determine how a certain drug affects levels of the target protein, such as analyzing levels of growth factors like HER2 and VEGF to determine the effectiveness of a cancer drug. This can also lessen the cost of drug research, as it can allow for previous testing to see if a lead molecule would even bind to a given protein without having to go past pre-clinical testing.
