= Anat (disambiguation) =

Anat is a Semitic goddess and a Hebrew female given name. ANAT or Anat may refer to:

== People ==
- Anat Biletzki (born 1952), Israeli philosophy professor
- Anat Brunstein Klomek (born 1973), Israeli psychologist
- Anat Draigor (born 1960), Israeli basketball player
- Anat Fabrikant (born 1975), Israeli Olympic competitive sailor
- Anat Fort (born 1970), Israeli musician
- Anat Gov (1953–2012), Israeli playwright and screenwriter
- Anat Lelior (born 2000), Israeli Olympic surfer
- Anat Maor (born 1945), Israeli politician
- Anat Peleg (born 1957), Israeli author
- Anat Waxman (born 1961), Israeli actress and comedian
- Anat Zamir (1962–2018), Israeli model and actress
- Anat Zuria (born 1961), Israeli film director

== Places ==
- Anat (ancient city), an ancient city on the Euphrates
- Anadyr Time, or Kamchatka Time, a time zone

== Organizations ==
- ANAT Technology, Articulated Nimble Adaptable Trunk
- Australian Network for Art and Technology

== See also ==
- Ant (name)
- Annat (disambiguation)
