= Franz Alt =

Franz Alt may refer to:

- Franz Alt (mathematician) (1910–2011), Austrian-born American mathematician
- Franz Alt (painter) (1821–1914), Austrian landscape painter
- Franz Alt (journalist) (born 1938), German journalist
