= Abts =

- Language: Dutch, German

Origin
- Language: Old Saxon or Middle Dutch
- Origin: abt
- Meaning: "abbot"

Abts, a variation of the surname Abt, is an occupational surname of Dutch and German origin derived from the clerical title of abbot. Notable people with the surname include:

- Matt Abts (born 1953), American drummer
- Tomma Abts (born 1967), German artist and abstract painter
- Wouter Abts, Flemish painter

== See also ==
- ABTS, a chemical compound used to observe the reaction kinetics of specific enzymes
- Abt (disambiguation)
