= Analytical base table =

In database theory, the analytical base table or analytic base table (ABT) is a flat table that is used for building analytical models and scoring (predicting) the future behavior of a subject.

A single record in this table is referred to as an analytical record or analytic record (AR), and represents the subject of the prediction (e.g. a customer) and stores all data (variables) describing this subject. If for example the subject is a customer then the record may be referred to as a customer analytic record or "CAR".

Basically, there are two categories of data: who is the subject (describing subject characteristics related to the organization, such as socio-demographic-geographic data, events, etc.), and what does the subject do (describing characteristics of subject behavior, product purchase, product usage, payment behavior, relationship instances, etc.).

Analytical base tables may be developed as a more general instance applicable to solving general business problems, but more often it is developed for solving very specific business problems.
