= Clark C. Abt =

American educationist and researcher (born 1929)

- Born: 31 August 1929 (age 96); Cologne, Germany
- Occupations: Pedagogue, researcher

Clark C. Abt (born 31 July 1929; birth name: Claus Peisak) is a German-born American researcher. He became an American citizen in 1945, at age 16, and is known for first formalizing the concept and usages of serious games.

== Biography ==
Abt left Germany for the United States in 1937. In 1947, he applied as an aeronautics student at the Massachusetts Institute of Technology, where he graduated in 1951. He then served four months in the merchant navy as a seaman, then spent a year at Johns Hopkins University as an English teacher, eventually obtaining a master's degree in the Writing, Discourse and Drama Department for his thesis, titled A Year of Poems. In 1965, he earned a PhD from MIT in political science. He founded Abt Associates immediately afterwards.

He married Wendy Peter on November 3, 1971, fathering a son and daughter. His son is Thomas Abt, a senior research fellow focusing on evidence-informed crime research at the Harvard Kennedy School.

== Works ==
Abt is known for his book Serious Games (1970), where he formally established a basis for the concept of serious game.

In this work and subsequent ones, he described sports games, role playing games and (then marginal) computer games as mediums for educative, political or marketing ideas. This interest probably stemmed from Abt's involvement with the development of TEMPER, an early computer wargame designed for a Cold War context.
