= Jakob Alt =

German painter (1789–1872)

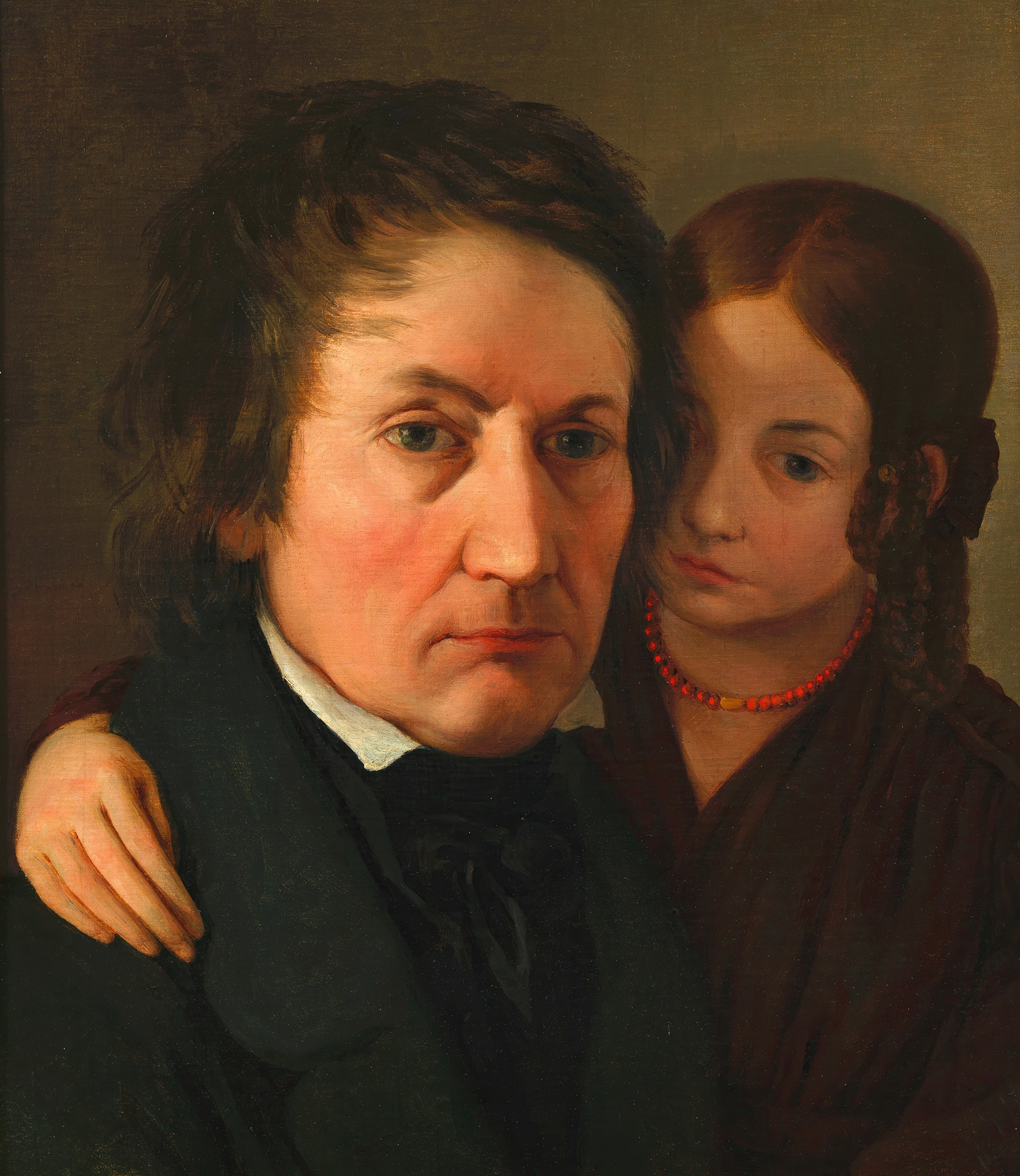
- Alt with his daughter Luise, Franz Alt, c. 1820
- Born: 27 September 1789; Frankfurt am Main, Germany
- Died: 30 September 1872 (aged 83); Vienna, Austria

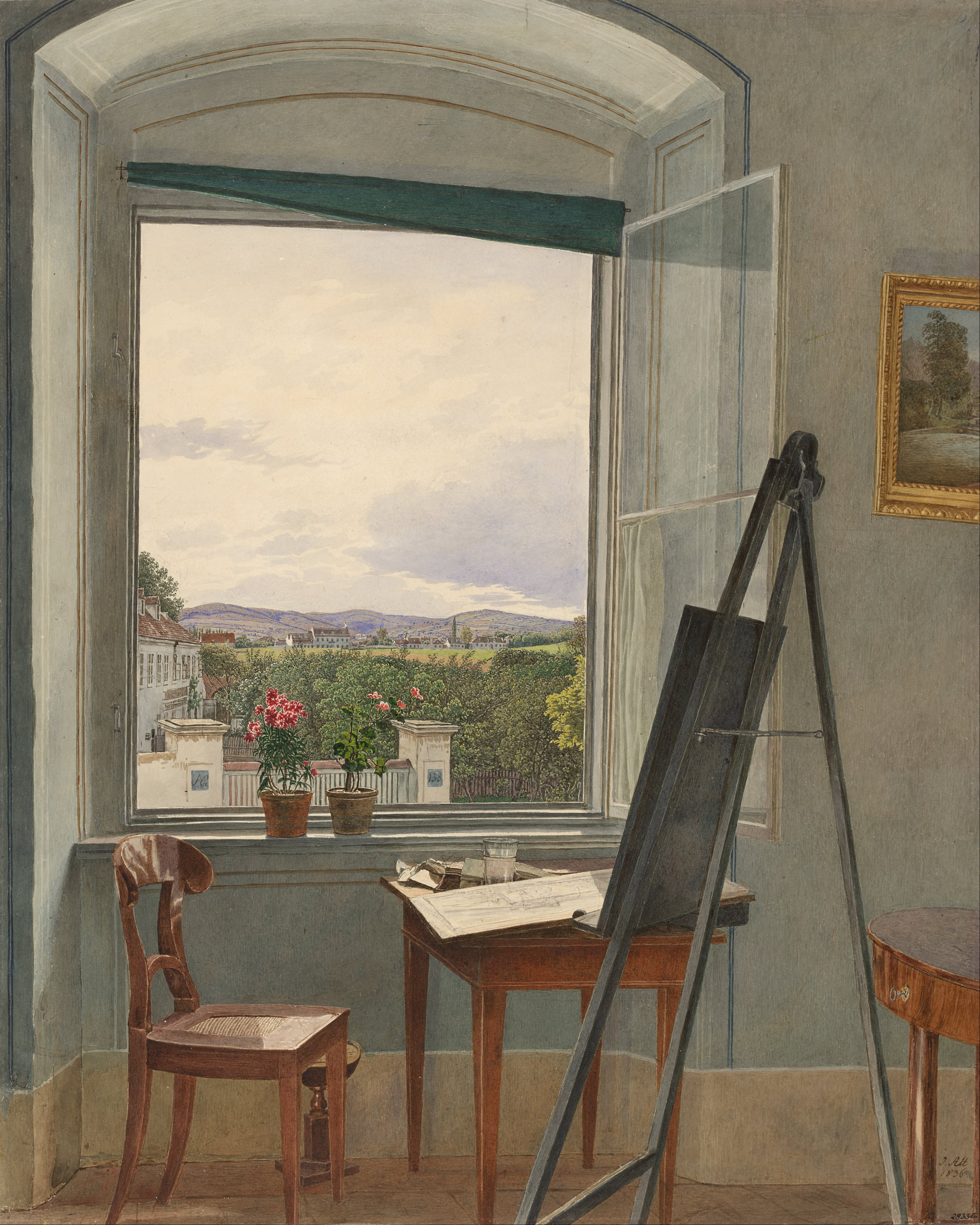
View from the Artist's Studio in Alservorstadt toward Dornbach, 1836

Jakob Alt (27 September 1789 – 30 September 1872) was a German painter and lithographer.

== Life ==
Alt was the son of Barbara Alt, née Horst, and Frankfurt carpenter Johann Leonhart Alt. He was born at Frankfurt am Main in 1789, where he received his early artistic education. Later he moved to Vienna and entered the Academy. He soon became noted as a landscape painter and made various journeys throughout Austria and Italy, painting, as he went along, views in the neighborhood of the Danube and in the city of Vienna.

In later life Alt painted a lot in watercolor; he was also a lithographer. In 1830 the future Emperor Ferdinand I of Austria began a project to commission paintings of the most beautiful views in the Empire. Alt, and his eldest son, Rudolf von Alt painted about 170 of the 300 works executed before the scheme came to an end in 1849. Alt's extensive herbarium is now in the Lower Austrian State Museum .

He died in Vienna in 1872.

== Gallery ==
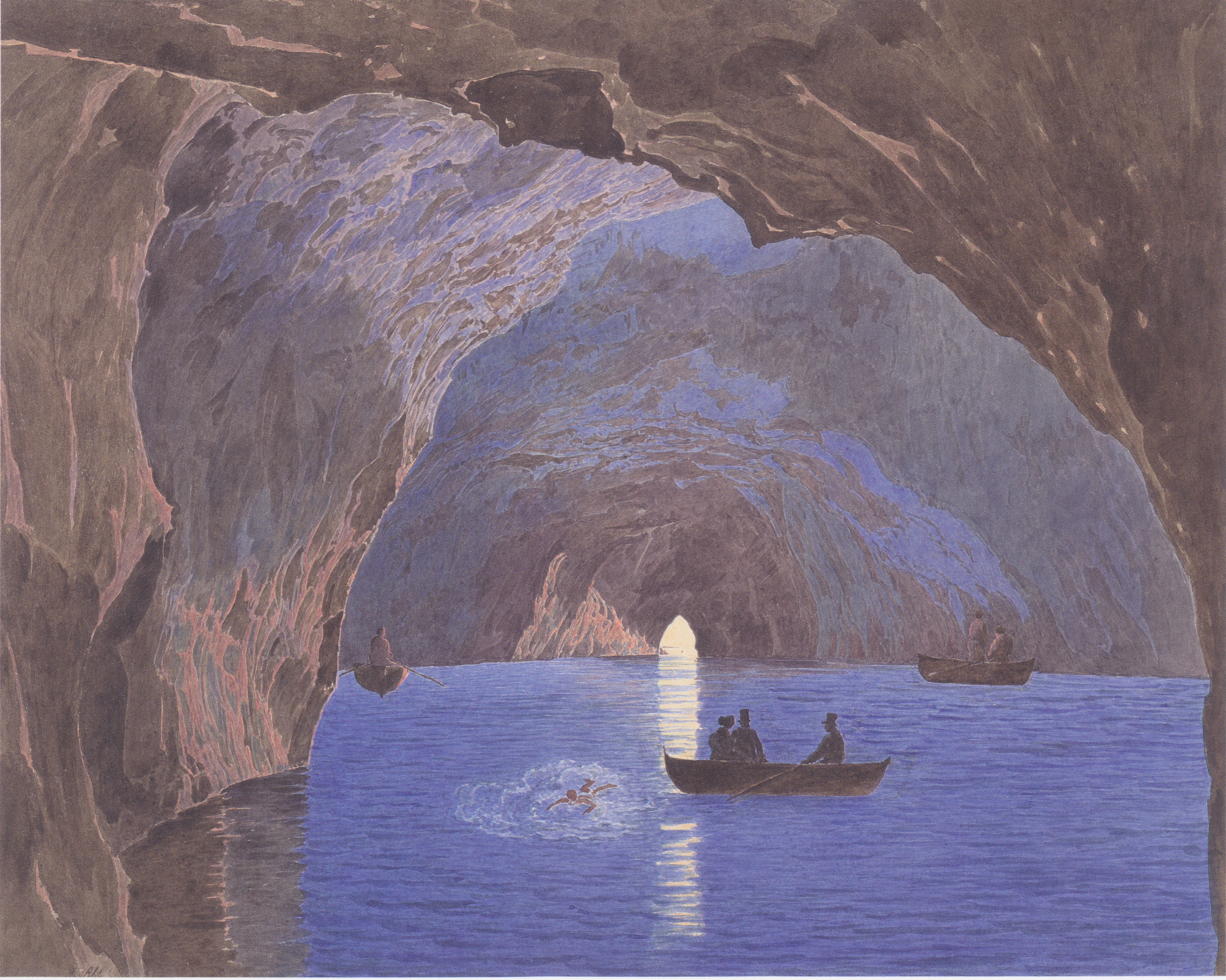
The blue grotto in Capri

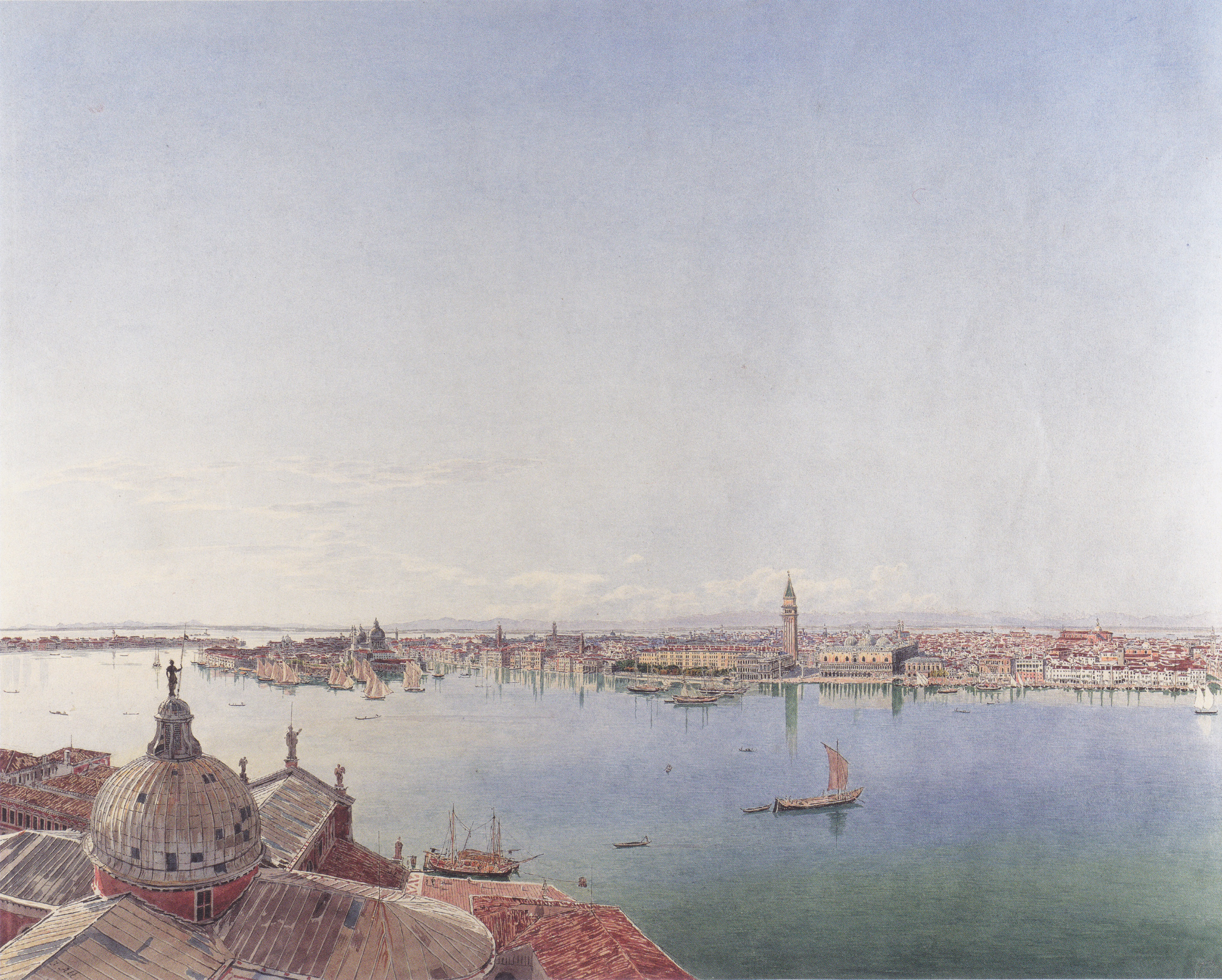
Venice, 1835

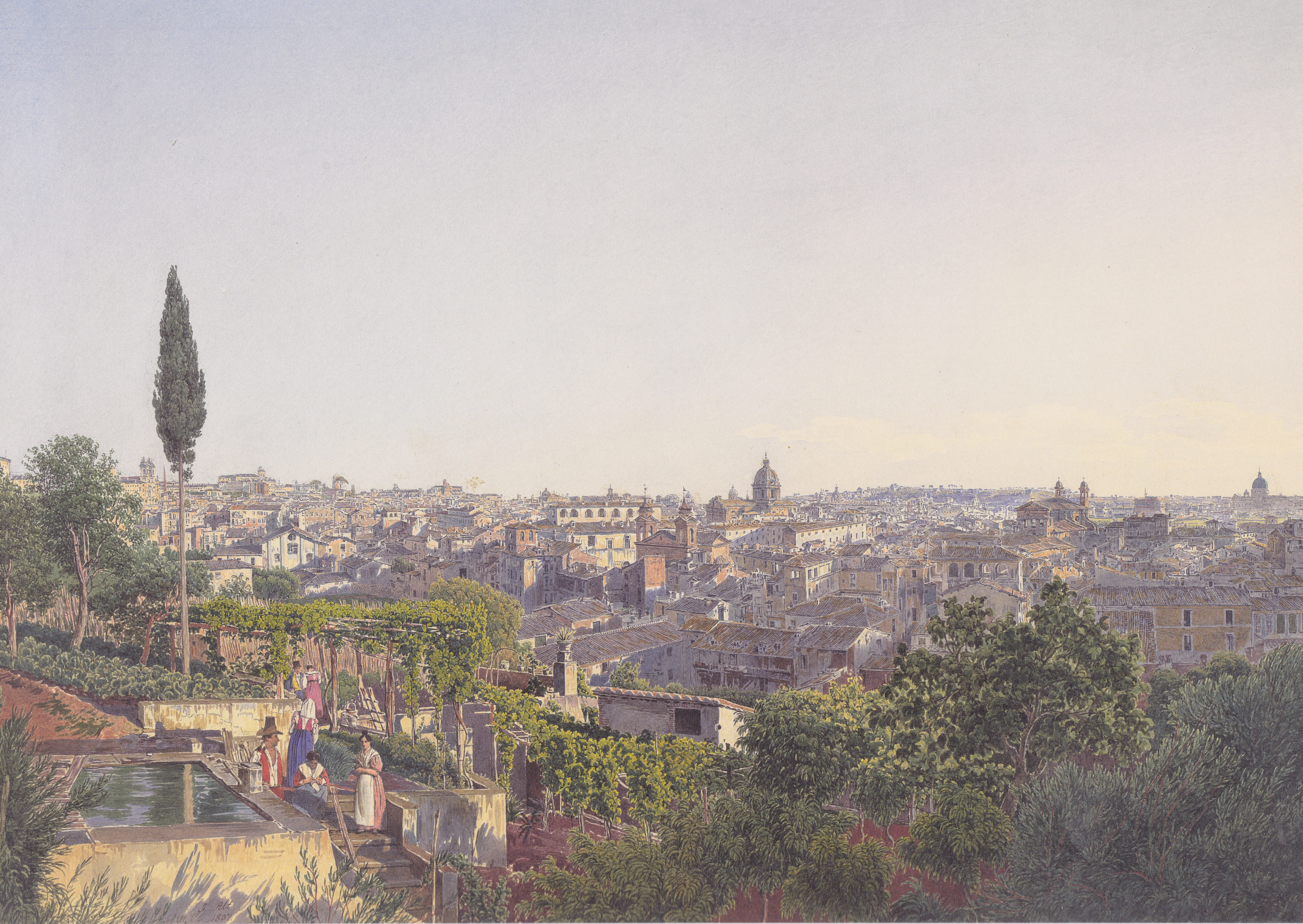
View of Rome, 1837 watercolor now in the Albertina, Vienna

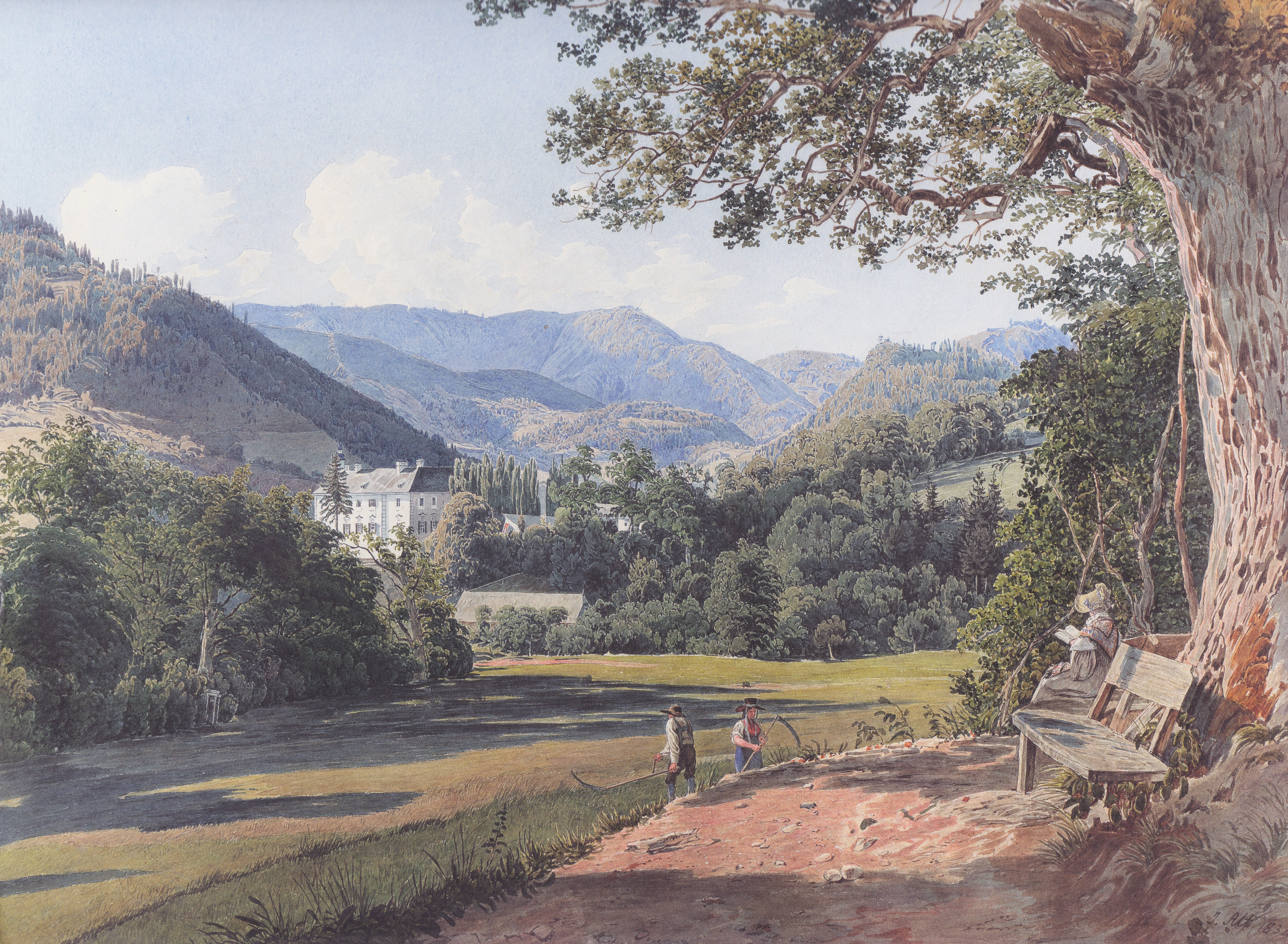
Stiebar Castle, Austria, 1834

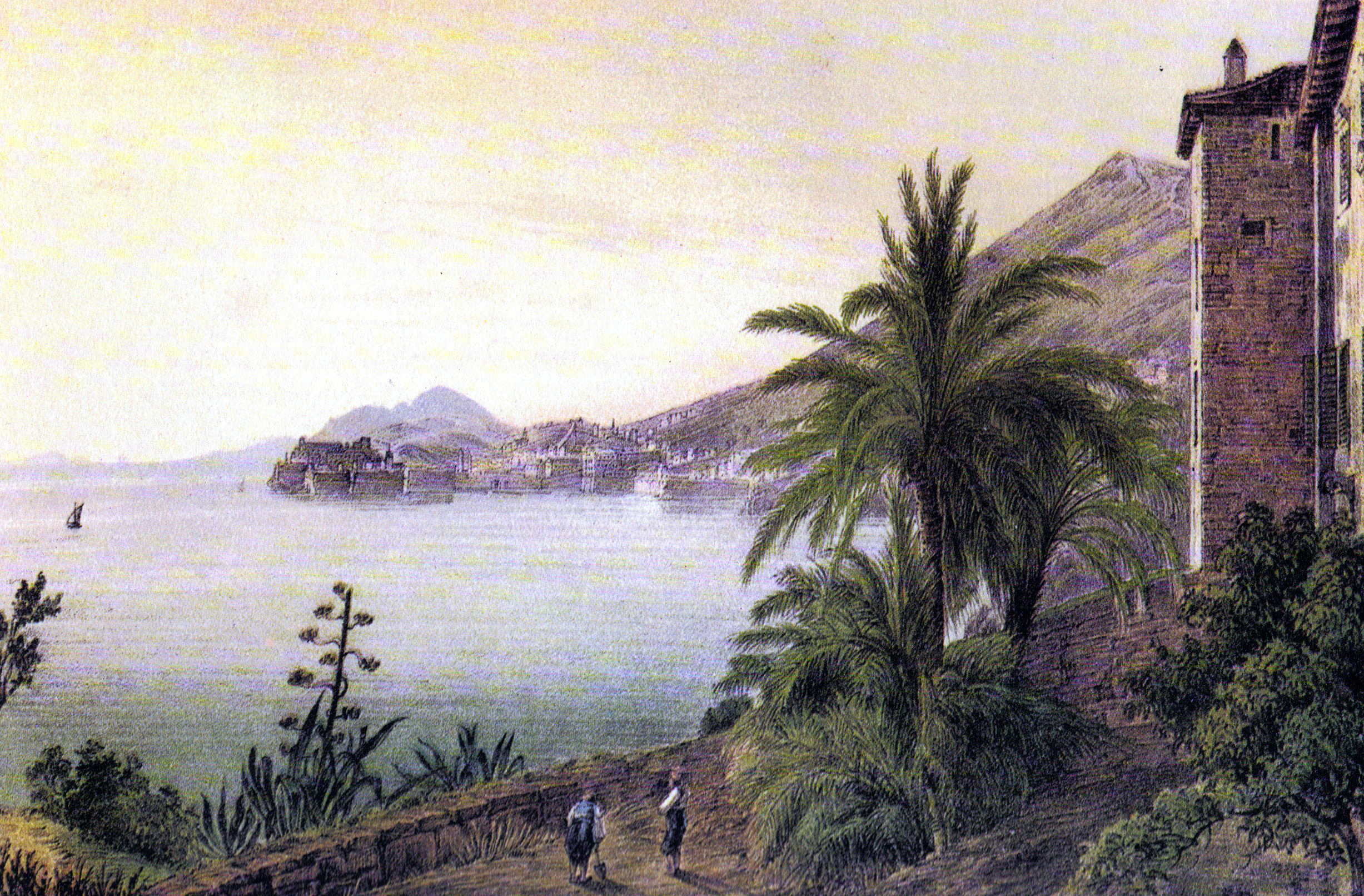
Dubrovnik bay, 1840

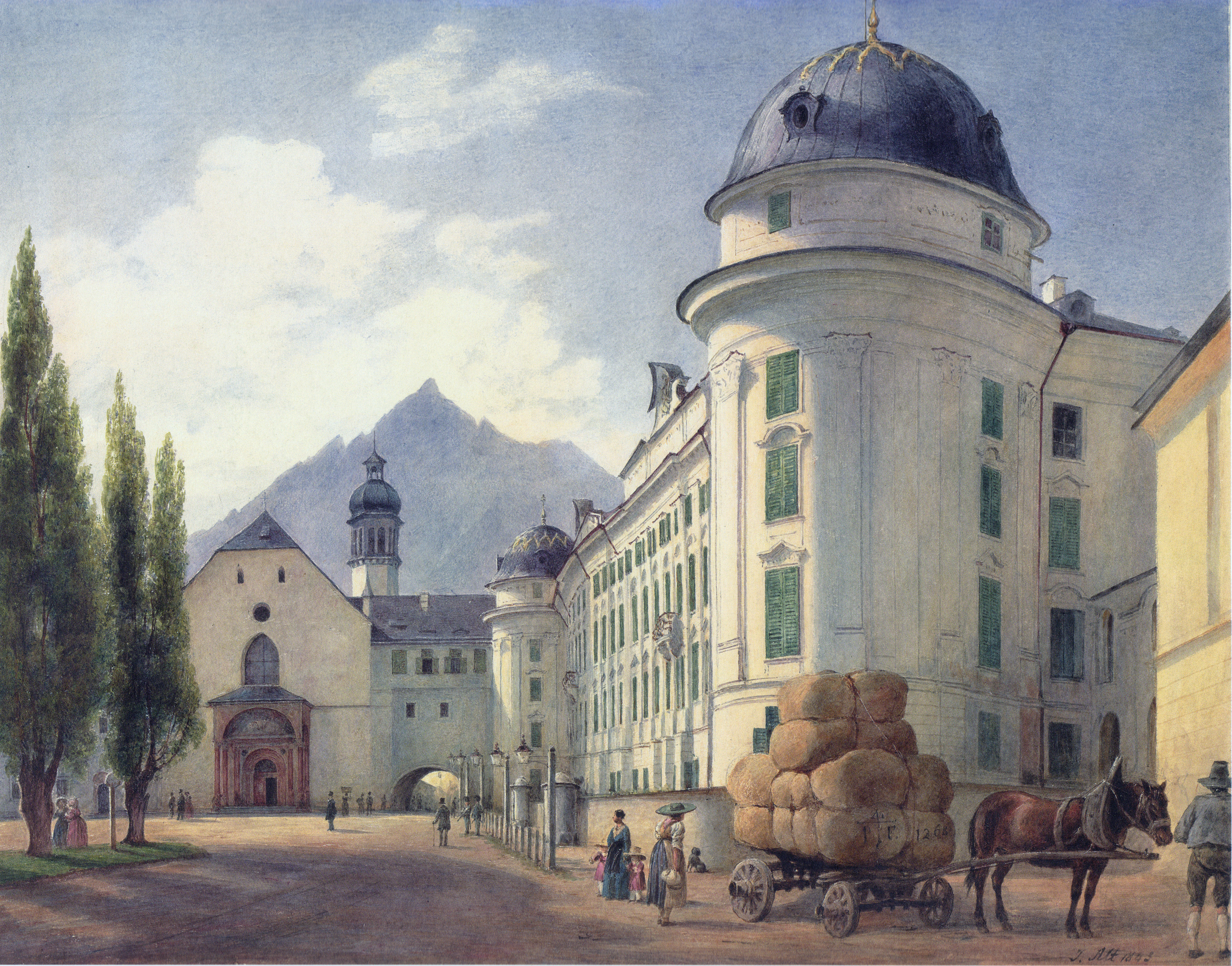
Innsbruck, 1845

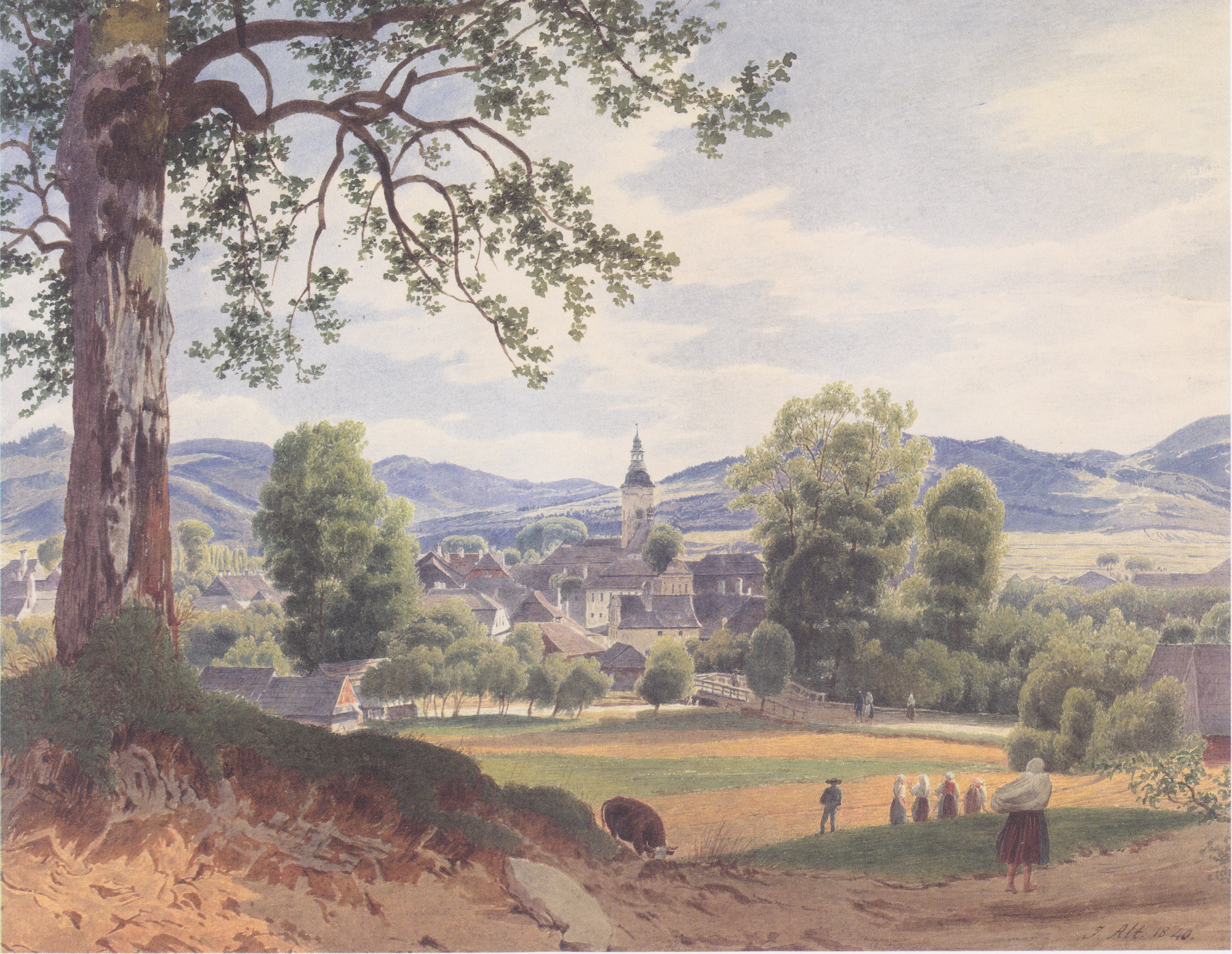
Jablunkov, 1840

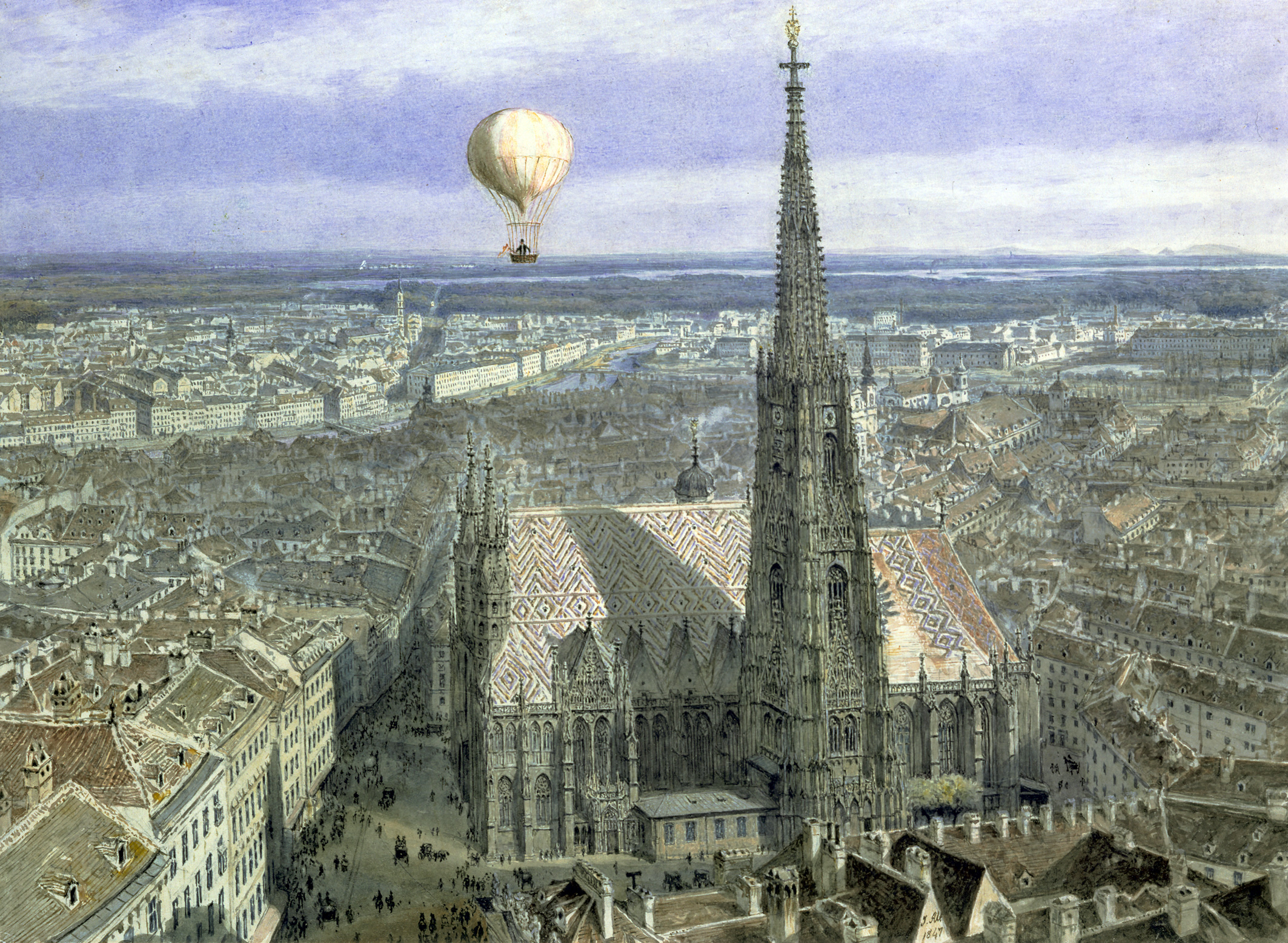
Wien

== See also ==
- List of German painters
