= Joe Alt =

American football player (born 2003)

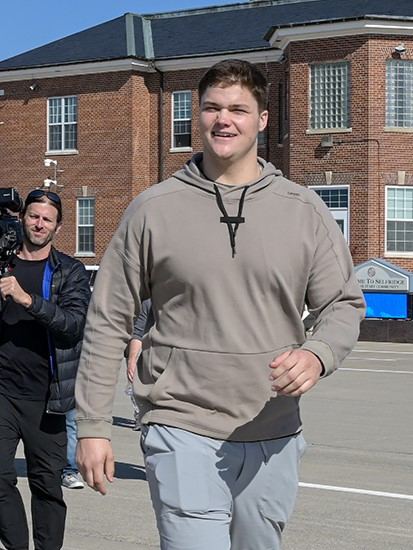
- Alt at Selfridge Air National Guard Base in 2024

No. 76 – Los Angeles Chargers
- Position: Offensive tackle
- Roster status: Active

Personal information
- Born: February 28, 2003 (age 23); North Oaks, Minnesota, U.S.
- Listed height: 6 ft 8 in (2.03 m)
- Listed weight: 322 lb (146 kg)

Career information
- High school: Totino-Grace (Fridley, Minnesota)
- College: Notre Dame (2021–2023)
- NFL draft: 2024: 1st round, 5th overall pick

Career history
- Los Angeles Chargers (2024–present)

Awards and highlights
- Pro Bowl (2025); PFWA All-Rookie Team (2024); Unanimous All-American (2023); First-team All-American (2022)

Career NFL statistics as of 2025
- Games played: 22
- Games started: 22
- Stats at Pro Football Reference

Joseph George Alt (born February 28, 2003) is an American professional football offensive tackle for the Los Angeles Chargers of the National Football League (NFL). He played college football for the Notre Dame Fighting Irish, twice earning All-American honors before being selected fifth overall by the Chargers in the 2024 NFL draft. He is the son of former Kansas City Chiefs player John Alt and younger brother of ice hockey player Mark Alt.

== Early life ==
Alt was born on February 28, 2003, in North Oaks, Minnesota. He attended the Totino-Grace High School in Fridley, Minnesota. He played inside linebacker, offensive tackle, and tight end. He committed to the University of Notre Dame to play college football.

== College career ==
As a true freshman at Notre Dame in 2021, Alt played offensive tackle and tight end. He played in all 13 games and started the final 13 games at left tackle. In 2023, he was a finalist for the Outland Trophy, which is awarded to the nation's best OL/Interior DL. He was unanimously named to the 2023 College Football All-America Team and declared for the 2024 NFL draft following the season.

== Professional career ==
Pre-draft measurables
Height	Weight	Arm length	Hand span	Wingspan	40-yard dash	10-yard split	20-yard split	20-yard shuttle	Three-cone drill	Vertical jump	Broad jump	Bench press
6 ft 8 5/8 in (2.05 m)	321 lb (146 kg)	34 1/4 in (0.87 m)	10 in (0.25 m)	6 ft 10 3/4 in (2.10 m)	5.05 s	1.73 s	2.93 s	4.51 s	7.31 s	28.0 in (0.71 m)	9 ft 4 in (2.84 m)	27 reps
All values from NFL Combine

Alt was selected by the Los Angeles Chargers fifth overall in the 2024 NFL draft. On June 10, 2024, Alt signed his four-year rookie contract with the Chargers worth $33.2 million guaranteed that included a signing bonus of $20.9 million.

=== 2024 season ===
Alt started 16 games in his rookie season, only missing week 4. He was named to the PFWA All-Rookie Team.

=== 2025 season ===
Alt started the first four games for the Chargers before suffering a high ankle sprain in an eventual 21–18 loss to the New York Giants. After missing the next three games, Alt started in Weeks 8 and 9 before being carted off the field after suffering an ankle injury in the second quarter of a 27–20 win against the Tennessee Titans. On November 3, 2025, the Chargers announced that Alt would undergo season-ending ankle surgery. He was placed on injured reserve on November 5. Despite the injury, he was named to his first ever Pro Bowl.

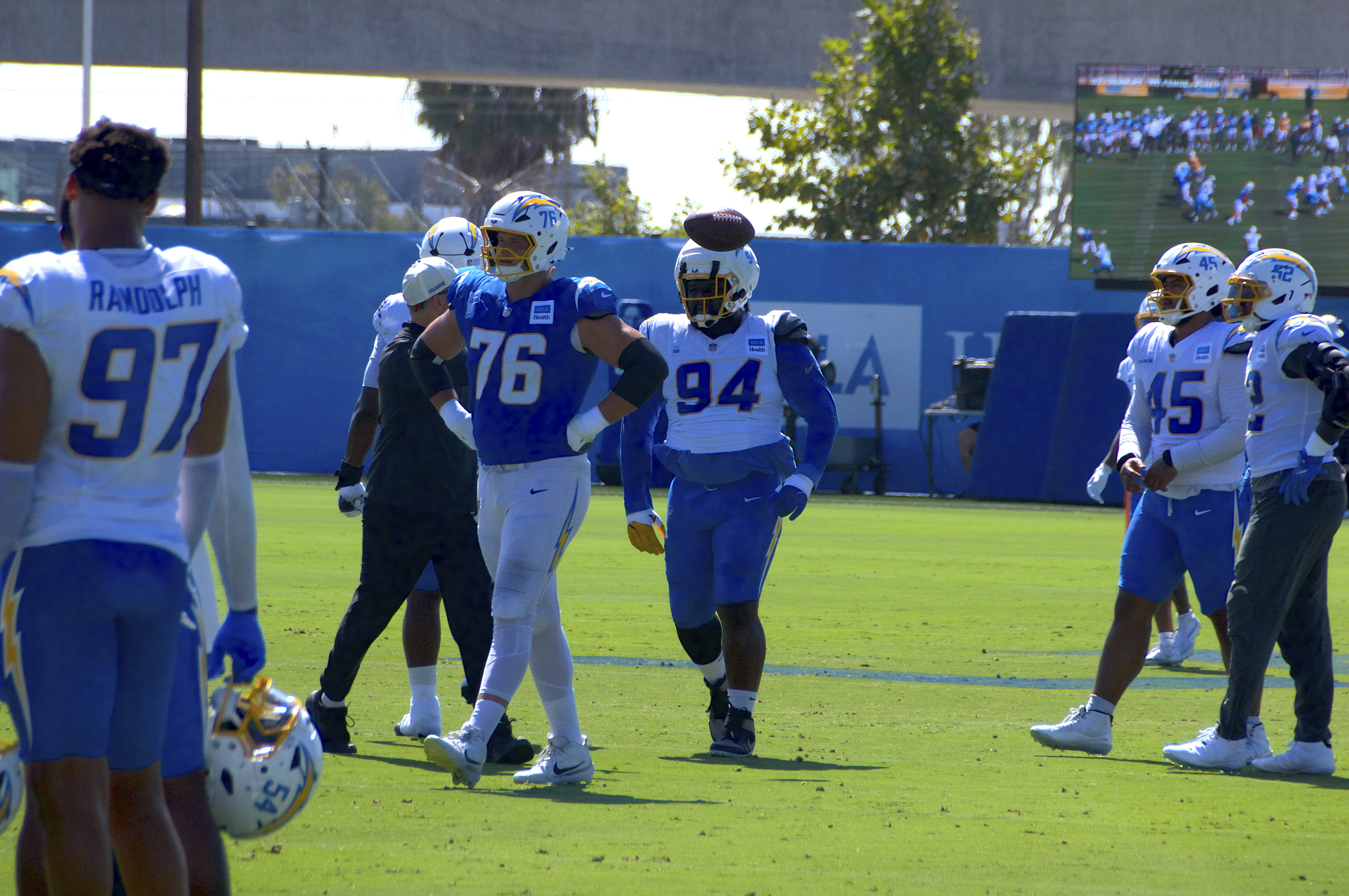
Alt (wearing #76) at Chargers training camp in August 2026

== Personal life ==
His father John Alt played in the NFL for the Kansas City Chiefs. His older brother Mark is a professional ice hockey player. As a defenseman, Mark played 20 games in the National Hockey League.
