= Association for Learning Technology =

Learned society in the UK

The Association for Learning Technology (ALT) is a United Kingdom professional body and learned society. Founded in 1993 as a Registered Charity, ALT brings together people and organisations with an interest in the use of learning technology.

== Membership ==
ALT has over 170 organisational and sponsoring members, and over 2,290 individual members as reported in the 2016/17 accounts. Organisational members include the majority of the UK's universities. Sponsoring members include public sector agencies such as the Department for Business, Innovation and Skills and the Higher Education Academy, and companies such as Blackboard, Google, Microsoft and Toshiba. There are three categories of individual member: Associate Member, Ordinary Member, and, under a scheme which has operated since 2005, Certified Member (CMALT).

== Activities ==
ALT's activities include the following:

- ALT-C, which is the UK's main conference for learning technologists. Past keynote speakers at ALT-C have included Martin G. Bean, David Cavallo, Wendy Hall, Eric Mazur, Natasa Milic-Frayling, Sugata Mitra, Peter Norvig, Richard Noss, Hans Rosling, Carol Twigg, Michael Wesch, Dylan Wiliam.
- Responding to consultations relating to learning technology and e-learning. Some of these responses are referenced in Government publications.
- Workshops and occasional smaller conferences.
- Certification of members under the CMALT scheme, see http://www.alt.ac.uk/cmalt/.
- Working in partnership with other organisations, such as the Association of Colleges, Jisc, LSIS, NIACE, and the TEL Programme.

== Aims ==
ALT aims to:

1. Increase the impact of Learning Technology for public benefit
2. Provide stronger recognition of and representation for Learning Technology professionals on a national level
3. Lead the professionalisation of research and practice in Learning Technology

== Publications ==
- Research in Learning Technology, an international peer-reviewed Open Access journal which aims to raise the profile of research in learning technology, encouraging research that informs good practice and contributes to the development of policy;
- a public wiki with resources of interest to the learning technology community;
- a members' digest, which is sent fortnightly to nearly 2000 subscribers;
- a quarterly printed and web-based Newsletter available at http://newsletter.alt.ac.uk/.
