= Clara Ant =

Brazilian architect and political activist

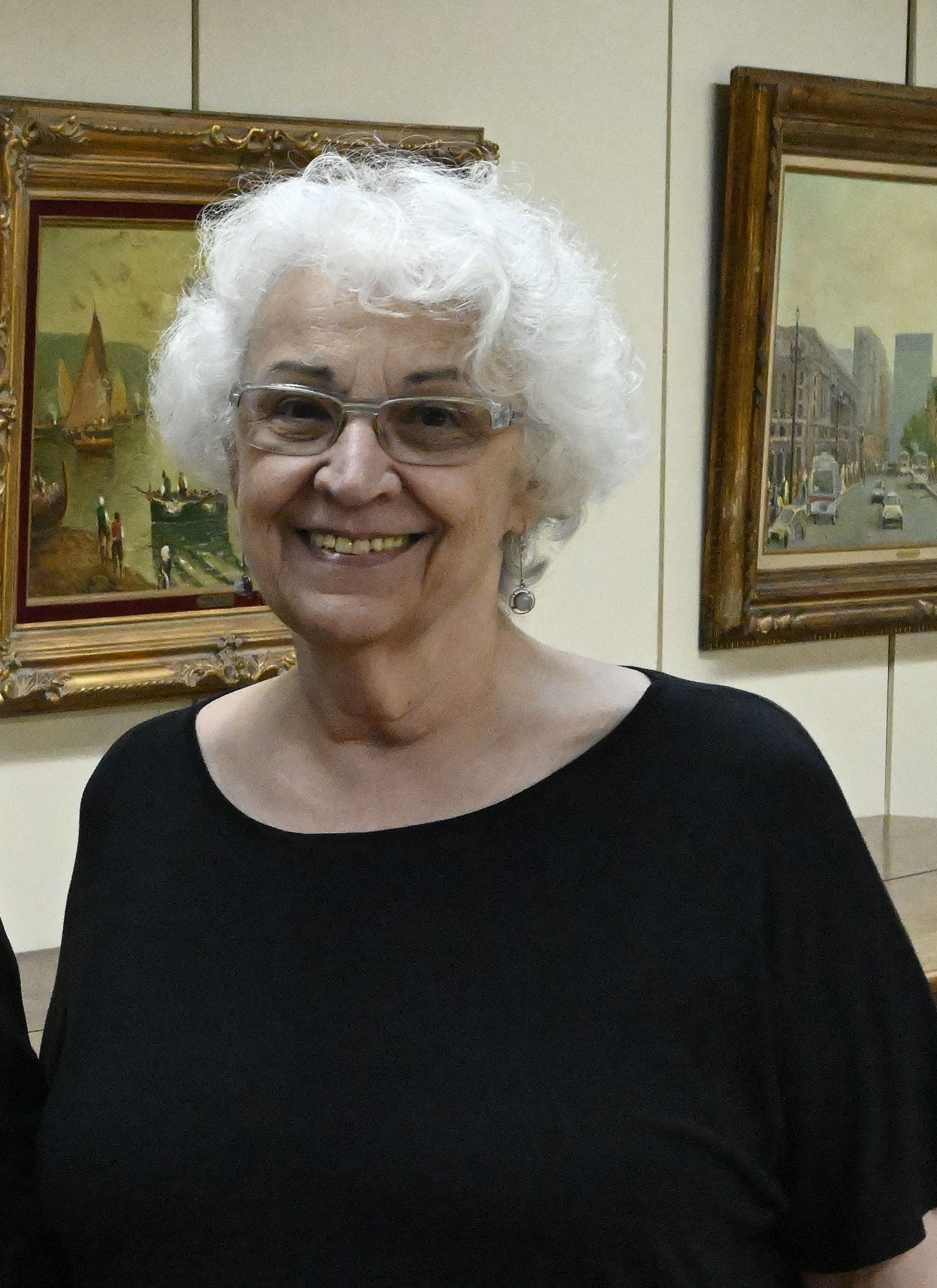
- Clara Ant in March 2023

Personal details
- Born: 7 February 1948 (age 78) La Paz, Bolivia

Clara Levin Ant (born 7 February 1948) is a Bolivian architect and political activist in Brazil.

She started her political activity in the Trotskyist movement Liberdade e Luta but later moved to the centre left. Ant has been an activist of the Brazilian Partido dos Trabalhadores since its onset and was the party's treasurer before been elected a parliamentarian in 1986. Later she became involved in the Executive branch of government as a regional administrator in the city of São Paulo under Marta Suplicy. She served as the Personal Assistant to Brazilian President Luiz Inácio Lula da Silva. She played a role communicating between Lula / PT and the Brazilian Jewish community.
