= Access Television Network =

Access Television Network (ATN) was a company based in Coral Gables, Florida, that mainly carried paid programming for 300 cable television systems with a peak reach of 35 million households. It was generally broadcast by cable systems on existing channels during the early morning hours when no regular programming was scheduled, often overlaying that channel's own block of paid programming. In late 2002, ATN expanded with the purchase of the Product Information Network (PIN), a similar 24-hour cable infomercial network.

However, after incidents where ATN/PIN paid programming (often unknown to the customer where it was coming from) was laid over several NBA and NHL playoff games which went into multiple overtimes in the graveyard slot on their networks, earning heavy customer complaints to providers about the arrangement (along with networks such as Animal Planet beginning to carry a 24/7 schedule which would be pre-empted by the practice), networks cracked down on the practice of their own programming being overlaid by their carriage partners, and began to enforce their networks in future contracts as being carried as-is full-time, severely affecting the ATN/PIN business model. After that ATN began to be carried individually as its own channel on most systems, but was either completely ignored or immediately deleted by cable customers on their channel map who saw no original programming on its channel.

== History ==
ATN was founded by William Bernard in 1993 in Irvine, California. It had over 200 shareholders which included a venture capital firm Spectrum Equity Investors and the Hearst Family Fund. ATN bought out Spectrum Equity with a loan through Wells Fargo Foothill. This loan was in turn purchased by Gladstone Capital who is the current largest debt holder of ATN.

In early 2012 ATN ceased operations as it could no longer generate sufficient revenues to pay its affiliates and satellite transponder obligations. George Henry filed a Chapter 7 bankruptcy for Pacific Media Direct LLC on July 13, 2012.
