= Annat, Argyll =

Coordinates: 56.34°N 05.18°W

Annat
- Location within Argyll and Bute
- OS grid reference: NN0322
- Council area: Argyll and Bute
- Country: Scotland
- Sovereign state: United Kingdom
- Police: Scotland
- Fire: Scottish
- Ambulance: Scottish

Annat (Scottish Gaelic: An Annaid) is a village near Loch Awe in Argyll and Bute, Scotland.
