= Paul W. Abt =

American businessman and politician

Paul William Abt (April 25, 1845 – August 21, 1920) was an American businessman and politician.

Abt was born in what is now Germany and emigrated to the United States in 1864. He eventually settled in East St. Louis, Illinois, in 1873, and was involved in the banking business. He served on the East St. Louis Board of Education and as county treasurer for St. Clair County, Illinois. Abt also served in the Illinois Senate from 1915 to 1919 and was a Republican. He died at his home in East St. Louis, Illinois.
