= Amman National School =

- Amman; Jordan

Information
- Type: Private
- Religious affiliation: Islam
- Established: 1985
- Key people: Dara al-Taher: Head of Board of Directors; Zuka' al-Taher: Academic Principal
- Enrollment: 800
- Average class size: 65 sq.m. – 100 sq.m
- Student to teacher ratio: 8/1
- Campus: 15,000 square meters
- Colors: White, yellow, green, red, blue
- Mascot: As seen in the logo
- Website: http://ans.edu.jo/

The Amman National School (ANS) is a private educational institution located in Amman, Jordan. The head principal is Dara Taher.

== History ==
It was established in 1985 and included only junior Grades. The school started with grades 1–3 in a rented building. Two years later, the school moved to its current location in Dabouq for grades KG-5. From then onward, the school added a grade every year. The first graduating class was in 1995. Since then, the school has continued to expand and extra facilities and classrooms have been added to provide more learning space and services. ANS, now, has full enrollment of 800 students from KG-12th grade.

== Curriculum ==
ANS currently offers the Jordanian high school program (Tawjihi) and IB Diploma Program for grades 11–12. IGCSE was also offered at ANS until the end of the school year 2006–2007. ANS offers the Jordanian National Program for grades (1-12). Students can also choose to join an international program starting 9th grade. The school is authorized to give the International Baccalaureate Diploma for grades (11-12).

== Accreditation ==
ANS is accredited by the International Baccalaureate . The school is licensed by the Jordanian Ministry of Education.

== Students ==
The school body stands at 900 students. The majority of students at ANS are Jordanians. The school also includes a diverse expatriate population, with students from Algeria, Cyprus, Egypt, Lebanon, Morocco, Palestine, Syria, Sweden, and Tunisia, and the United States.
