= George Ant =

Greek music video director

- Born: Greece
- Occupation: Director
- Years active: 2010–present
- Website: www.georgeant.com

George Ant is a Greek music video director in the Greek musical industry, who has worked with a wide range of artists, among them Giannis Ploutarhos, Shaya, Nikos Ganos (Nicko), Kelly Kelekidou, Nikos Karvelas, Mattyas, Dimos Anastasiadis, Mark Angelo, C:Real, Ηousetwins, Christos P., Giorgos Sampanis, Marina Sena and Slick Beats. He has also directed a number of short films and commercials.

== Music videography ==
- Nicko - Break me
- Giannis Ploutarhos - De me pairnei
- Shaya - Lene
- Giorgos Sampanis - Ora Miden
- Nicko - Say my Name
- Mark Angelo feat. Mary Jeras - Insane
- Shaya feat. Housetwins & Slick beats - Summer all Around
- Dimos Anastasiadis - Psemata
- C:real - Athropines sheseis
- Ηousetwins feat. Lisa Rray - Feeling
- Nikos Karvelas & Lakis Papadopoulos - Ola einai mes'to myalo
- Christos P. - H kardia mou antimilaei
- Mattyas - Missing you
- Kelly Kelekidou - Teleftaia fora
- Marina Sena - To agori pou pligwnw
- Marina Sena - Poia Monaksia
- Nikos Ganos - Poso Akoma
- Vera Boufi - Se Thelo Dipla Mou
- Stella Kalli - Tipota
