= Acid neutralizing capacity =

Measure for the overall buffering capacity against acidification of a solution

Acid-neutralizing capacity or ANC in short is a measure for the overall buffering capacity against acidification of a solution, e.g. surface water or soil water.

ANC is defined as the difference between cations of strong bases and anions of strong acids (see below), or dynamically as the amount of acid needed to change the pH value from the sample's value to a chosen different value. The concepts alkalinity are nowadays often used as a synonym to positive ANC and similarly acidity is often used to mean negative ANC. Alkalinity and acidity however also have definitions based on an experimental setup (titration).

ANC is often used in models to calculate acidification levels from acid rain pollution in different geographical areas, and as a basis for calculating critical loads for forest soils and surface waters.

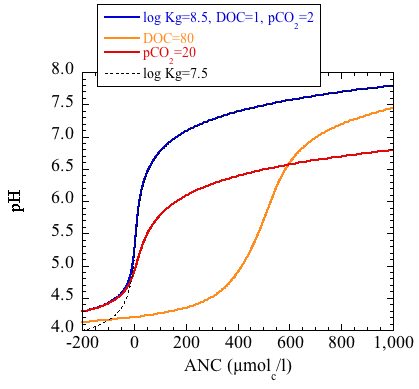
Diagram showing sample pH–ANC relationships for natural waters

The relation between pH and ANC in natural waters depends on three conditions: Carbon dioxide, organic acids and aluminium solubility. The amount of dissolved carbon dioxide is usually higher than would be the case if there was an equilibrium with the carbon dioxide pressure in the atmosphere. This is due to biological activity: Decomposition of organic material releases carbon dioxide and thus increases the amount of dissolved carbon dioxide. An increase in carbon dioxide decreases pH but has no effect on ANC. Organic acids, often expressed as dissolved organic carbon (DOC), also decrease pH and have no effect on ANC. Soil water in the upper layers usually have higher organic content than the lower soil layers. Surface waters with high DOC are typically found in areas where there is a lot of peat and bogs in the catchment. Aluminium solubility is a bit tricky and there are several curve fit variants used in modelling, one of the more common being:

[Al^{3+}] = k_{G}[H^{+}]^{3}

In the illustration to the right, the relation between pH and ANC is shown for four different solutions. In the blue line the solution has 1 mg/L DOC, a dissolved amount of carbon dioxide that is equivalent to a solution being in equilibrium with an atmosphere with twice the carbon dioxide pressure of our atmosphere. For the other lines, all three parameters except one is the same as for the blue line. Thus the orange line is a solution loaded with organic acids, having a DOC of 80 mg/L (typically very brown lake water or water in the top soil layer in a forest soil). The red line has a high amount of dissolved carbon dioxide (pCO_{2} = 20 times ambient), a level that is not uncommon in ground water. Finally the black dotted line is a water with a lower aluminium solubility.

The reason why ANC is often defined as the difference between cations of strong bases and anions of strong acids is that ANC is derived from a charge balance: If we for simplicity consider a solution with only a few species and use the fact that a water solution is electrically neutral we get

[H^{+}] + 2[Ca^{2+}] + [Na^{+}] + 3[Al^{3+}] + 2[Al(OH)^{2+}] + [Al(OH)^{+}_{2}] = [OH^{−}] + [Cl^{−}] + 2[CO^{2−}_{3}] + [HCO^{−}_{3}] + [R^{−}]

where R^{−} denote an anion of an organic acid. ANC is then defined by collecting all species controlled by equilibrium (i.e. species related to weak acids and weak bases) on one side and species not controlled by equilibrium (i.e. species related to strong acids and strong bases) on the other side. Thus, with the species above we get

ANC = 2[Ca^{2+}] + [Na^{+}] − [Cl^{−}]

or

ANC = [OH^{−}] + 2[CO^{2−}_{3}] + [HCO^{−}_{3}] + [R^{−}] − [H^{+}] − 3[Al^{3+}] − 2[Al(OH)^{2+}] − [Al(OH)^{+}_{2}]

== Note ==
1. that a change in DOC or CO_{2} (or for that matter Aluminium solubility, but Aluminium solubility is not something that is easily controlled) does NOT have any effect on ANC.
2. that once a pH–ANC relation for has been established for a lake the pH–ANC relation can be used to easily calculate the amount of limestone needed to raise lake pH to e.g. 5.5
3. not all acid lakes are acid due to human influence since high DOC gives low pH.
4. that the concentrations are multiplied with the charge of the species, hence the unit mol charge per liter
