= Mark Alt =

American ice hockey player (born 1991)

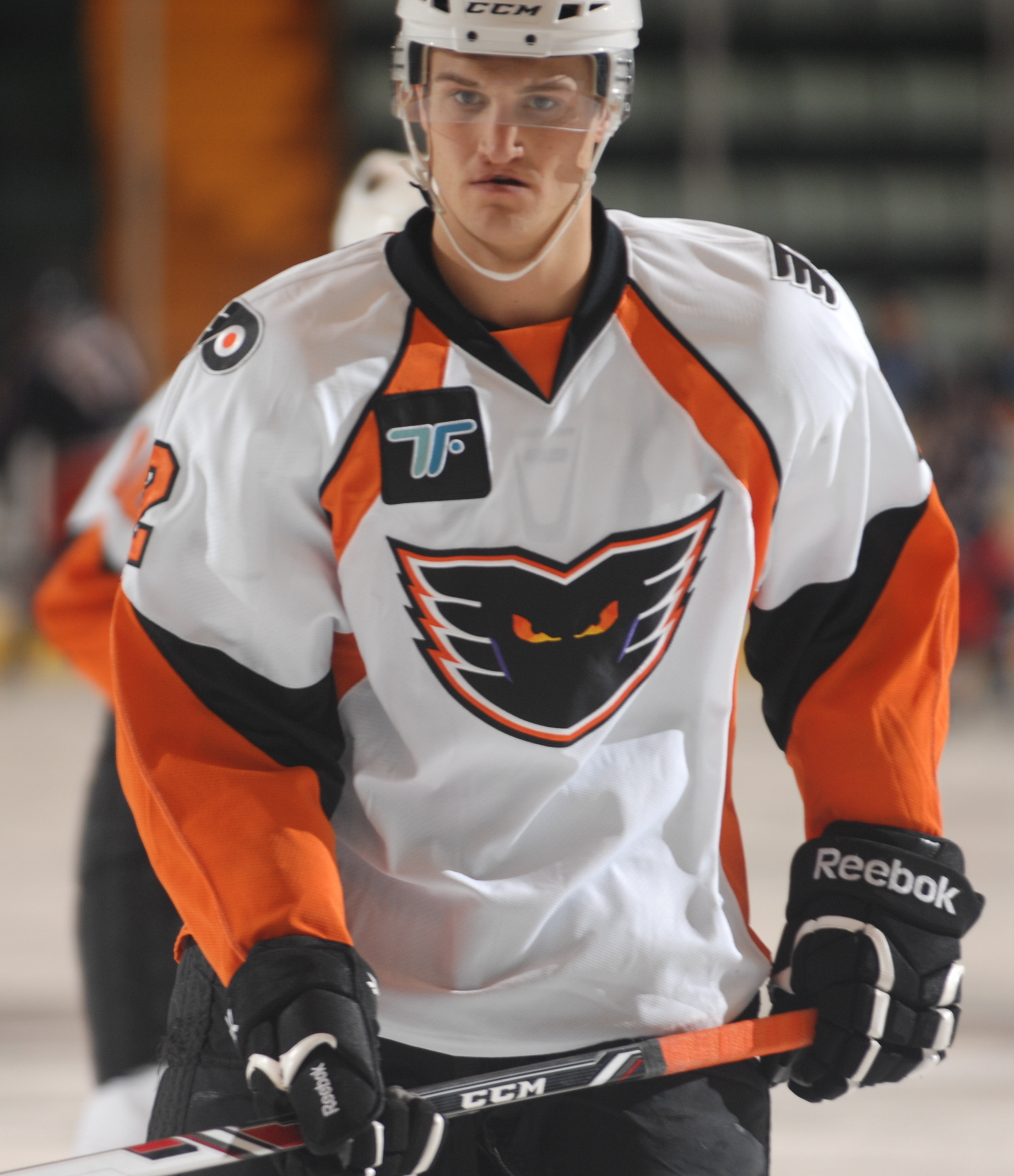
- Alt with the Adirondack Phantoms in 2013
- Born: October 18, 1991 (age 34) Kansas City, Missouri, U.S.
- Height: 6 ft 4 in (193 cm)
- Weight: 201 lb (91 kg; 14 st 5 lb)
- Position: Defense
- Shot: Right
- Played for: Philadelphia Flyers; Colorado Avalanche; Los Angeles Kings; Straubing Tigers
- NHL draft: 53rd overall, 2010; Carolina Hurricanes
- Playing career: 2013–2023

Mark Alt (born October 18, 1991) is an American former professional ice hockey defenseman. He is the son of former Kansas City Chiefs player John Alt and older brother of Los Angeles Chargers player Joe Alt.

== Early life ==
Alt was a two sport star at Cretin-Derham Hall High School in Minnesota. Having begun playing hockey at the age of 5, Alt was later part of the team that qualified for the 2009 Minnesota high school hockey tournament. He was earlier drafted second overall in the 2007 Futures United States Hockey League draft by the Chicago Steel, but he elected to continue playing exclusively with Cretin-Derham Hall and was a finalist for the 2010 Minnesota Mr. Hockey Award.

On the football field, Alt played quarterback, throwing 26 touchdowns and running for six. He was offered football scholarships to the University of Iowa, University of Akron, and the University of Kansas before ultimately opting against his father's advise to pursue a hockey career in committing to the University of Minnesota under the guidance of head coach Don Lucia.

== Playing career ==
=== Amateur ===
Alt was selected 53rd overall in the 2010 NHL entry draft by the Carolina Hurricanes. He joined the Minnesota Golden Gophers in the 2010–11 season. After missing the first game of the season, he participated in 35 consecutive games. His 10 points (two goals, eight assists) ranked fourth among Gophers defenders in points. He played in his first NCAA game on October 9, 2010, versus Massachusetts. In the same game, he logged his first career NCAA point, an assist on the game-winning goal. January 15, 2011, would mark the first NCAA goal of his career, as he scored versus divisional rival North Dakota.

Alt participated in the 2010 U.S. National Junior Evaluation Camp in Lake Placid, New York. Focused on sharpening his defensive shutdown ability, Alt took on a leadership role as a sophomore in the 2011–12 season, while increasing his points totals with 5 goals and 22 points in 43 games.

In his junior season in 2012–13, Alt fully transitioned to a shutdown defense role, recording just 7 assists in 39 games for the Gophers. During the campaign, Alt's NHL rights were traded by the Hurricanes to the Philadelphia Flyers on January 13, 2013, along with Brian Boucher, for Luke Pither. For a second consecutive year he was selected to the WCHA All-Academic Team with a 4.0 grade point average.

=== Professional ===
==== Philadelphia Flyers ====
After his third season of collegiate hockey with the Golden Gophers, having scored 39 points in 117 collegiate games, Alt signed a three-year entry-level contract with the Philadelphia Flyers on April 7, 2013. He immediately joined the Flyers' American Hockey League affiliate, the Adirondack Phantoms, on an amateur try-out contract to finish the 2012–13 regular season. Appearing in 6 games with the Phantoms, Alt earned praise from veteran NHL player and blueline partner Andreas Lilja.

In his first full professional season, Alt was reassigned to continue with the Adirondack Phantoms for the duration of the 2013–14 campaign. He tied for second on the club amongst defenseman with 22 assists and 26 points in 75 games. In the 2014–15 season, Alt was again reassigned to the AHL by the Flyers, joining the relocated Lehigh Valley Phantoms for their inaugural season. Limited to just 44 games due to injury, Alt recorded 2 goals and 10 points. Continuing his upward development the Flyers, Alt was recalled on emergency, and made his NHL debut, playing 9:25 with Philadelphia in a 3-2 shootout loss to the San Jose Sharks on March 28, 2015.

In the final year of his entry-level contract, Alt remained exclusively in the AHL with the Phantoms in the 2015–16 season, appearing in a further 72 games paired alongside Samuel Morin in a shutdown role, collecting 4 goals and 19 points. On June 26, 2016, he agreed to a one-year, two-way contract to remain with the Flyers.

He was assigned to return for his fourth season in the AHL in 2016–17. He was limited to just 40 games with injury, recording 1 goal and 11 points as the Phantoms reached the postseason for the first time in franchise history. Despite his reduced playing time, he placed second on the club in plus-minus (+8). As an impending restricted free agent, Alt was re-signed to a one-year, two-way contract to return for his sixth season within the Flyers organization on June 27, 2017.

In preparation for the 2017–18 season, Alt was among the last cuts at the Flyers training camp and was assigned to Lehigh Valley. As the Phantoms' best defenseman to start the year, Alt returned to the NHL for the first time in three seasons, as he was again used on an emergency basis in a 4-3 overtime defeat to the Arizona Coyotes on October 31, 2017. He was later officially recalled and featured in 7 more games before he was returned to the Phantoms on December 30, 2017. Alt posted 10 points in 23 games in the AHL before receiving his third recall to Flyers on January 22, 2018.

==== Colorado Avalanche ====
As the Flyers' reserve depth defenseman, Alt was a frequent healthy scratch and failed to feature in a game in over a month before he was placed on waivers in order to return to the AHL. On February 26, 2018, Alt was claimed off waivers by the Colorado Avalanche. With the Avalanche vying for a playoff position, he assumed the same role with his new club and remained in the press box until making his belated debut with Colorado in a 2-1 shootout victory over the Vegas Golden Knights on March 24, 2018. He played in 7 more games with the Avalanche to end the regular season and remained a healthy scratch in their first-round defeat to the Nashville Predators in the playoffs.

On May 11, 2018, Alt gave up his impending free agent status in signing a two-year, two-way extension with the Avalanche. After attending his first training camp with Colorado, Alt was among the last cuts prior to the 2018–19 season. He was reassigned to the Colorado Eagles of the AHL and was selected as team captain on October 4, 2018.

==== Los Angeles Kings ====
Following two seasons as the Eagles' captain, Alt left the Avalanche organization as a free agent at the conclusion of his contract. On October 9, 2020, Alt was signed to a one-year, two-way contract with the Los Angeles Kings. In the pandemic delayed 2020–21 season, Alt made a return to the NHL, featuring in 2 games with the Kings before he was assigned to their AHL affiliate, the Ontario Reign, for the remainder of the campaign. As an alternate captain, Alt appeared in 29 regular season games with the Reign, collecting 2 goals and 7 points.

==== Later years ====
As a free agent, Alt was unable to attract an NHL contract, opting to continue in the AHL by signing a one-year contract with the San Jose Barracuda, the primary affiliate of the San Jose Sharks, on August 2, 2021. In the following 2021–22 season, Alt, as an alternate captain, appeared in 46 regular season games with the Barracuda, posting 3 goals and 8 points. On March 28, 2022, Alt was traded to the Rochester Americans in exchange for Mason Jobst.

As a free agent leading into the 2022–23 season, Alt was belatedly signed to his first contract abroad, joining the Straubing Tigers of the Deutsche Eishockey Liga in Germany for the remainder of the season on February 8, 2023.

== Personal life ==
Alt's father, John, played left tackle in for the Kansas City Chiefs of the National Football League (NFL). He played in two Pro Bowls from 1984 to 1996. Alt was born in Kansas City, while his father was playing for the Chiefs.

His younger brother, Joe, followed John's steps as a football player, playing offensive tackle. He played college football for Notre Dame, and he currently plays for the Los Angeles Chargers.

== Career statistics ==
			Regular season					Playoffs
Season	Team	League	GP	G	A	Pts	PIM	GP	G	A	Pts	PIM
2007–08	Cretin-Derham Hall	USHS	17	1	5	6	4	—	—	—	—	—
2008–09	Cretin-Derham Hall	USHS	26	11	16	27	10	—	—	—	—	—
2009–10	Cretin-Derham Hall	USHS	24	6	14	20	20	—	—	—	—	—
2010–11	Minnesota Golden Gophers	WCHA	35	2	8	10	220	—	—	—	—	—
2011–12	Minnesota Golden Gophers	WCHA	43	5	17	22	43	—	—	—	—	—
2012–13	Minnesota Golden Gophers	WCHA	39	0	7	7	20	—	—	—	—	—
2012–13	Adirondack Phantoms	AHL	6	1	1	2	2	—	—	—	—	—
2013–14	Adirondack Phantoms	AHL	75	4	22	26	31	—	—	—	—	—
2014–15	Lehigh Valley Phantoms	AHL	44	2	8	10	18	—	—	—	—	—
2014–15	Philadelphia Flyers	NHL	1	0	0	0	0	—	—	—	—	—
2015–16	Lehigh Valley Phantoms	AHL	72	4	15	19	46	—	—	—	—	—
2016–17	Lehigh Valley Phantoms	AHL	40	1	10	11	10	5	0	0	0	2
2017–18	Lehigh Valley Phantoms	AHL	23	5	5	10	8	—	—	—	—	—
2017–18	Philadelphia Flyers	NHL	8	0	0	0	2	—	—	—	—	—
2017–18	Colorado Avalanche	NHL	7	0	0	0	0	—	—	—	—	—
2018–19	Colorado Eagles	AHL	61	6	13	19	30	4	1	1	2	0
2018–19	Colorado Avalanche	NHL	2	0	0	0	0	—	—	—	—	—
2019–20	Colorado Eagles	AHL	55	5	8	13	35	—	—	—	—	—
2020–21	Los Angeles Kings	NHL	2	0	0	0	2	—	—	—	—	—
2020–21	Ontario Reign	AHL	29	2	5	7	2	—	—	—	—	—
2021–22	San Jose Barracuda	AHL	46	3	5	8	20	—	—	—	—	—
2021–22	Rochester Americans	AHL	14	0	1	1	4	10	0	2	2	0
2022–23	Straubing Tigers	DEL	5	0	0	0	0	7	1	1	2	0
NHL totals			20	0	0	0	4	—	—	—	—	—

== Awards and honors ==
Award	Year
College
WCHA All-Academic Team	2012, 2013
