= Rudolf von Alt =

Austrian painter (1812–1905)

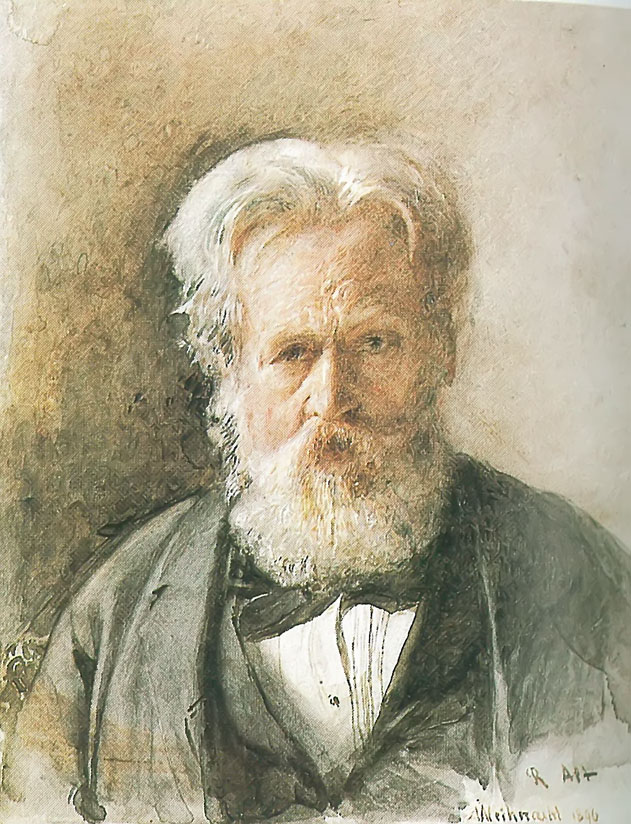
Self-portrait (1890)

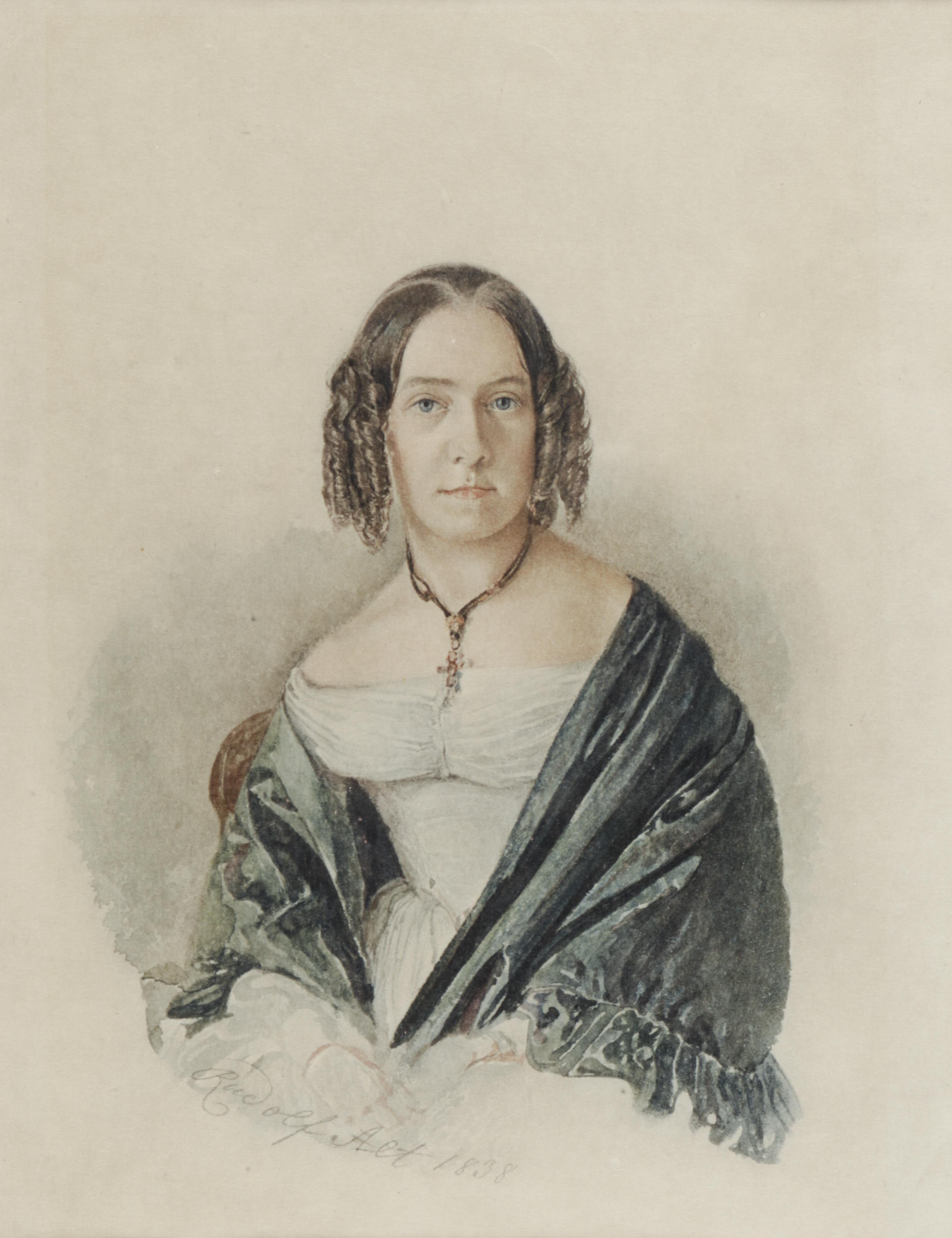
Portrait of a lady, 1838

Rudolf Ritter von Alt (Austrian German: [ˈruːdɔlf ˈrɪtɐ fɔn ˈalt]; 28 August 1812 – 12 March 1905) was an Austrian landscape and architectural painter. Born as Rudolf Alt, he acquired the title of Ritter after being knighted in 1889.

== Biography ==
Born in Vienna, he was the son of the lithographer Jakob Alt (1789–1871) and the brother of the painter Franz Alt (1821–1914). He studied at the Akademie der bildenden Künste in Vienna. Hiking-trips through the Austrian Alps and northern Italy awoke a love for landscapes, and he painted with his brush using watercolors in a very realistic and detailed style. In 1833, inspired by a visit to Venice and neighbouring cities, he also made a number of architectural paintings.

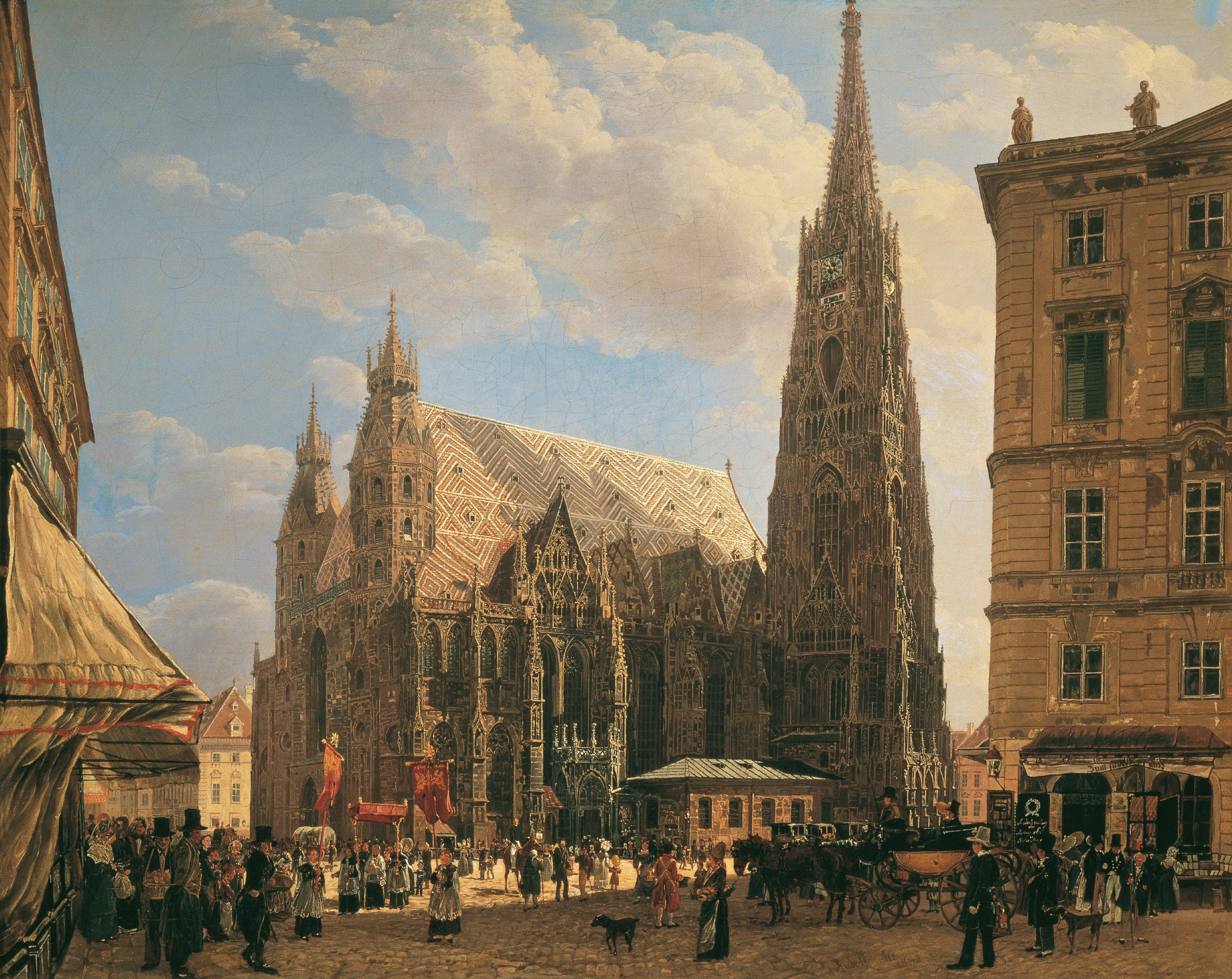
View of Stephansdom, from the Stock-im-Eisen, 1832

Alt demonstrated a remarkable talent for expressing certain peculiarities in nature. He managed to paint nature authentically by focusing on the different hues of sky, the colour-tone of the air and the vegetation. His later works came closer to Impressionism. His perspectives on architecture were interesting, and he often chose everyday objects to paint. The painting of interior views also became one of his strong points, giving him attention in Vienna.

He visited and worked for a while in Rome and Naples; after that he visited the lakes of Lombardy, then Galicia, Bohemia, Dalmatia, Bavaria and then returned multiple times to Italy. In 1863 he went to the Crimea to paint some views of an estate of the Empress, and in 1867 he went to Sicily.

== Death and legacy ==
Von Alt died in Vienna in 1905. The Albertina in Vienna has held retrospective exhibitions of his work. The Staatliche Graphische Sammlung München holds more than 600 of his works, including paintings.

== See also ==
- List of Austrian artists and architects
