= Helmut Abt =

German-American astrophysicist (1925–2024)

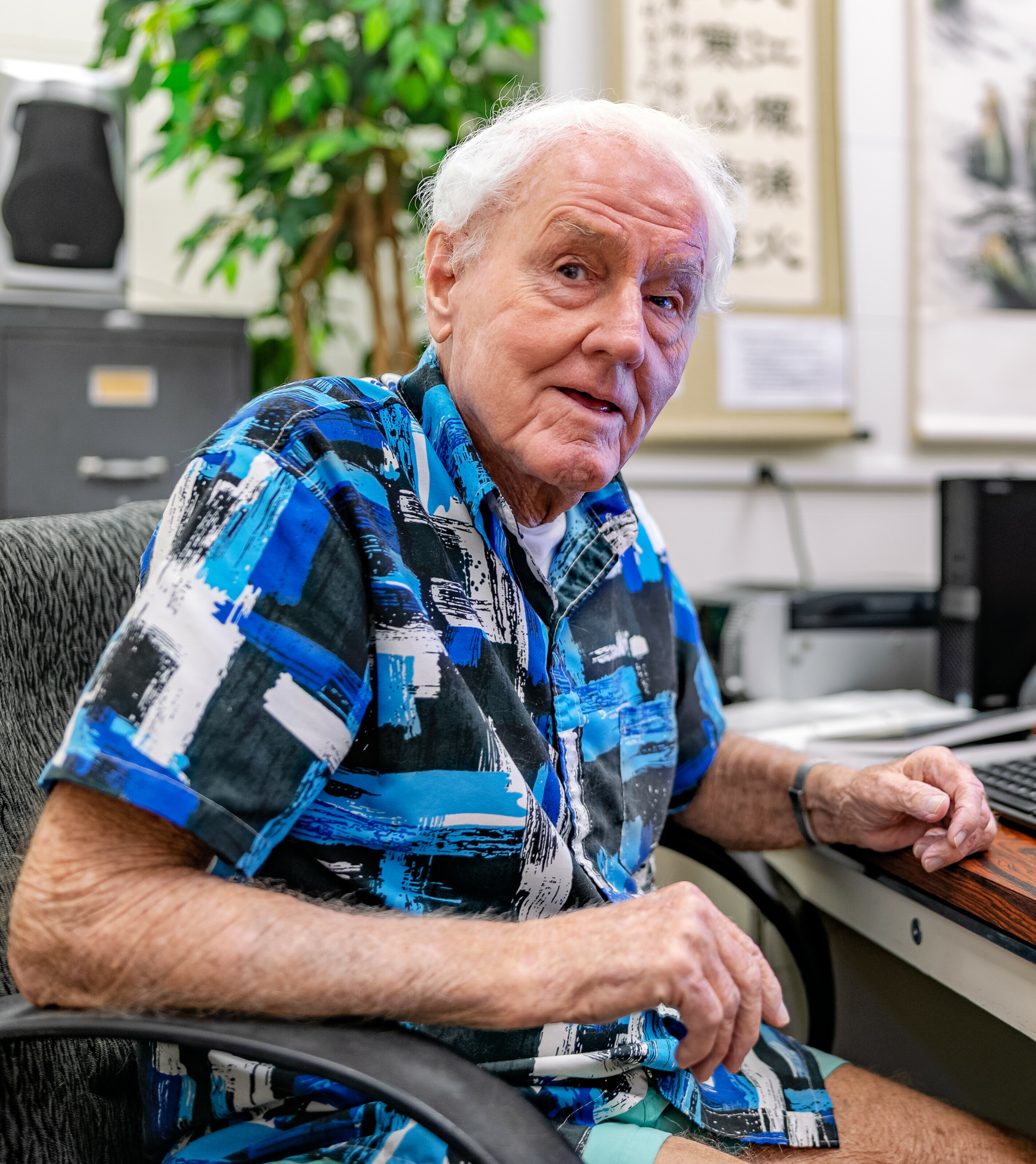
- Abt in 2022 at the NOIRLab HQ in Tucson, Arizona
- Born: Helmut Arthur Abt; 26 May 1925; Helmstedt, Brunswick, Germany
- Died: 22 November 2024 (aged 99)
- Education: Northwestern University; California Institute of Technology
- Awards: George Van Biesbroeck Prize (1997)
- Scientific career
- Fields: Astrophysicist
- Thesis: An Analysis of the Variable Star, W Virginis (1952)
- Doctoral advisor: Jesse L. Greenstein

Helmut Arthur Abt (26 May 1925 – 22 November 2024) was a German-born American astrophysicist, having worked at the National Optical Astronomy Observatory and an Elected Fellow of the American Association for the Advancement of Science. He was astronomer emeritus at the Kitt Peak National Observatory.

== Life and career ==
Helmut Arthur Abt was born in Helmstedt, Germany on 26 May 1925. His family emigrated to the United States when he was two. He received his B.S. in Mathematics from Northwestern University in 1946, M.S. in Physics from Northwestern University in 1948, and became the first person to be awarded a Ph.D. in astrophysics at California Institute of Technology in 1952 for his thesis work on W Virginis.

He then spent a year at Lick Observatory. From 1953 to 1959 he was assistant professor at Yerkes Observatory, part of the University of Chicago, then joined the staff of the Kitt Peak National Observatory as an astronomer, where he remained until 2000. From 1966 to 1968, he was President of the Astronomical Society of the Pacific. During 1971–1999 he was managing editor of the Astrophysical Journal.

His areas of research included stellar rotation; binary stars, including spectroscopic binaries; stellar classification; and bibliometrics of astronomy publications.

== Death ==
Abt died on 22 November 2024, at the age of 99.

== Awards and honors ==
Abt was awarded the George Van Biesbroeck Prize in 1997. The main-belt asteroid 9423 Abt, discovered by Spacewatch at Kitt Peak National Observatory in 1996, and Abt's star (SV Crateris/ HD 98088/ ADS 8115) in the constellation Crater were named in his honor.
