= John Alt =

German gridiron football player (born 1962)

No. 76
- Position: Offensive tackle

Personal information
- Born: May 30, 1962 (age 64); Stuttgart, West Germany
- Listed height: 6 ft 8 in (2.03 m)
- Listed weight: 298 lb (135 kg)

Career information
- High school: Columbia Heights (Columbia Heights, Minnesota, U.S.)
- College: Iowa
- NFL draft: 1984: 1st round, 21st overall pick

Career history
- Kansas City Chiefs (1984–1996)

Awards and highlights
- Second-team All-Pro (1990); 2× Pro Bowl (1992, 1993); Kansas City Chiefs Hall of Fame; First-team All-Big Ten (1983); Second-team All-Big Ten (1982)

Career NFL statistics
- Games played: 179
- Games started: 149
- Stats at Pro Football Reference

John Michael Alt (born May 30, 1962) is a former professional American football offensive tackle in the National Football League (NFL). He played his entire NFL career with the Kansas City Chiefs from 1984 to 1996. He was drafted in the first round of the 1984 NFL draft with the 21st overall pick. A graduate of Columbia Heights (MN) High School, he played his college years at the University of Iowa.

After retiring from the NFL, Alt began assistant coaching at Cretin-Derham Hall High School in Saint Paul, Minnesota, working with the offensive line. He then went to Totino-Grace High School to coach the offensive line when his son Joe started playing there.

Alt's son, Mark, was selected 53rd overall in the 2010 NHL entry draft by the Carolina Hurricanes, and played hockey for the Colorado Avalanche. Alt's other son, Joe, was selected fifth overall in the 2024 NFL draft by the Los Angeles Chargers.
