= 9423 Abt =

Asteroid

Discovery
- Discovered by: Spacewatch
- Discovery site: Kitt Peak Obs.
- Discovery date: 12 January 1996

Designations
- Named after: Helmut Abt (American astrophysicist)
- Alternative designations: 1996 AT_{7} · 1974 DU; 1981 US_{15} · 1983 CK_{8} 1990 VH_{15} · 1992 DP_{2}
- Minor planet category: main-belt · (middle) background

Orbital characteristics
- Epoch 4 September 2017 (JD 2458000.5)
- Uncertainty parameter 0
- Observation arc: 42.95 yr (15,686 days)
- Aphelion: 2.9681 AU
- Perihelion: 2.4182 AU
- Semi-major axis: 2.6932 AU
- Eccentricity: 0.1021
- Orbital period (sidereal): 4.42 yr (1,614 days)
- Mean anomaly: 114.30°
- Mean motion: 0° 13^{m} 22.8^{s} / day
- Inclination: 8.8476°
- Longitude of ascending node: 106.16°
- Argument of perihelion: 219.27°

Physical characteristics
- Dimensions: 12.690±0.145 km 12.84±0.86 km 13.29 km (calculated)
- Synodic rotation period: 3.2766±0.0003 h 3.281±0.005 h
- Geometric albedo: 0.10 (assumed); 0.132±0.012; 0.141±0.020
- Spectral type: S
- Absolute magnitude (H): 12.5 · 12.20 · 12.3 · 12.516±0.003 (R) · 12.15±0.31

9423 Abt, provisional designation 1996 AT_{7}, is a stony background asteroid from the central region of the asteroid belt, approximately 13 kilometers in diameter. It was discovered on 12 January 1996, by the Spacewatch project of the University of Arizona at Kitt Peak National Observatory, United States. The asteroid was named after American astronomer Helmut Abt.

== Orbit and classification ==
Abt is a non-family asteroid from the main belt's background population. It orbits the Sun in the central main-belt at a distance of 2.4–3.0 AU once every 4 years and 5 months (1,614 days). Its orbit has an eccentricity of 0.10 and an inclination of 9° with respect to the ecliptic. It was first identified as 1974 DU at Crimea-Nauchnij in February 1974, extending the body's observation arc by 22 years prior to its official discovery observation at Kitt Peak.

== Naming ==
This minor planet was named after American astrophysicist Helmut Abt (born 1925), one of the founders of the discovering Kitt Peak National Observatory, after which the minor planet 2322 Kitt Peak is named. His research included stellar properties and systems. As senior editor of The Astrophysical Journal he was responsible for converting it into its digital format. The official naming citation was published by the Minor Planet Center on 11 November 2000 (M.P.C. 41568).

== Physical characteristics ==
=== Rotation period ===
In 2006, a rotational lightcurve of Abt was obtained from photometric observation at Hunters Hill Observatory, Australia. Lightcurve analysis gave a well-defined rotation period of 3.281 hours with a brightness variation of 0.30 magnitude (U=3).

In 2012, a second lightcurve from the Palomar Transient Factory, California, gave a concurring period of 3.2766 hours with an amplitude of 0.33 magnitude (U=2).

=== Diameter and albedo ===
According to the surveys carried out by the NEOWISE mission of the NASA's Wide-field Infrared Survey Explorer and the Japanese Akari satellite, Abt measures 12.690 and 12.84 kilometers in diameter, and its surface has an albedo of 0.132 and 0.141, respectively.

The Collaborative Asteroid Lightcurve Link calculates a diameter of 13.29 kilometers, assuming an albedo of 0.10, a compromise figure between the brighter stony and darker carbonaceous bodies from the inner and outer asteroid-belt, respectively.
