= Association of Noise Consultants =

Organisation of companies in UK

The Association of Noise Consultants (ANC) is a UK-based organisation of companies that are engaged in the business of acoustics, noise and vibration consulting. It was established in 1973.

== Overview ==
There is a great range of specialisations within the ANC. Environmental noise consultants carry out measurement, calculation, evaluation and mitigation of noise pollution to fit within current noise regulation and produce an environmental impact assessment often leading to appearance as an expert witness at public inquiries. In building acoustics, sound insulation is tested between dwellings as required by approved document E of the Building Regulations, schools are designed for optimal learning conditions and the acoustic environments of performing arts venues are designed for their specific intended purposes.

== Association Chair ==
The role of ANC chair involves strategic co-ordination of board activities, and chairing the bi-monthly company meetings attended by representatives of the membership organisations. The position is currently held by Paul Shields, Dan Saunders is the Immediate Past Chair.

== President ==
The Association's President is also a member of the board, usually a more senior experienced acoustician holding a more overarching ambassadorial role. Graham Parry is the current president.
