= 8-Anilinonaphthalene-1-sulfonic acid =

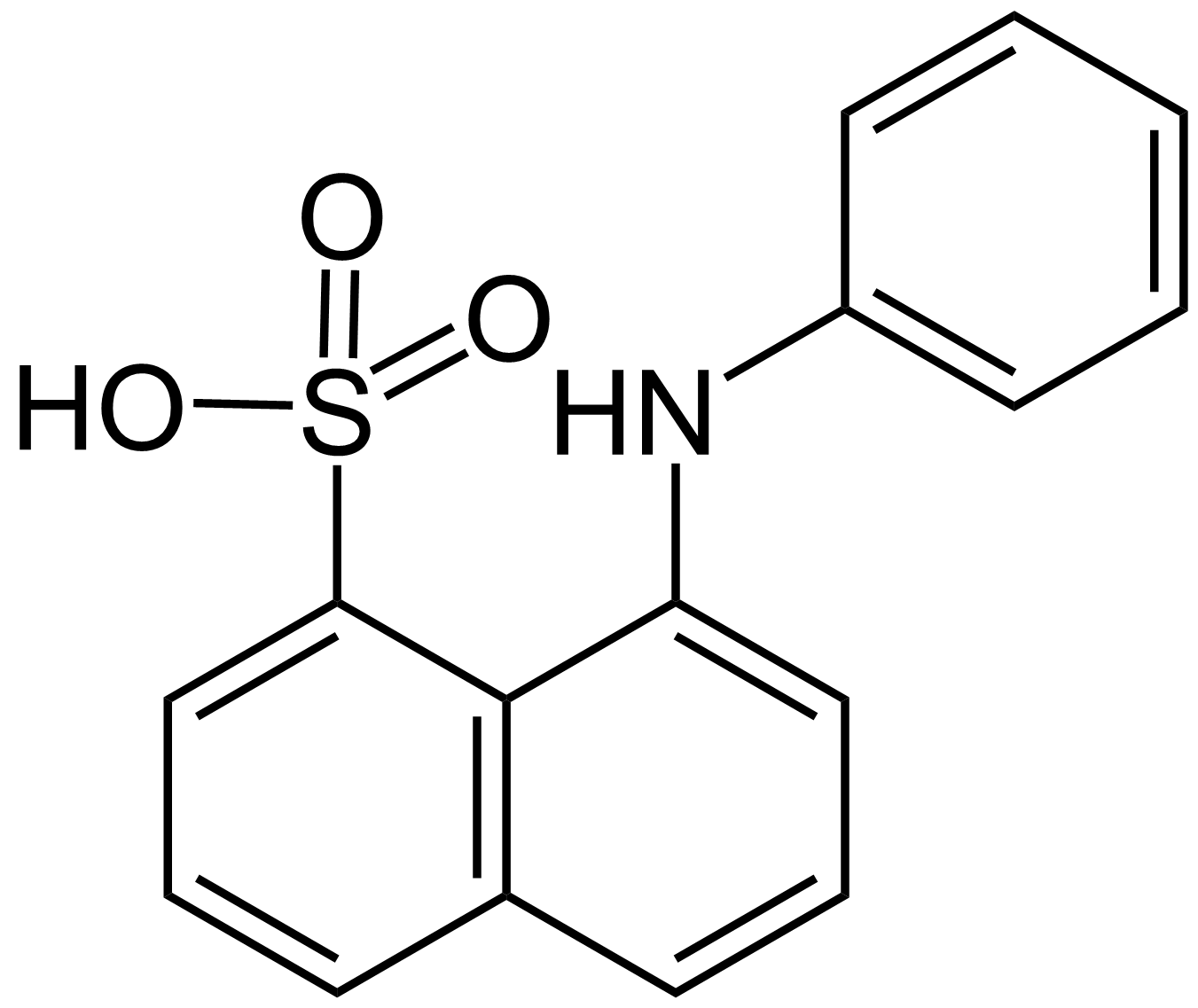

Names
- Preferred IUPAC name 8-Anilinonaphthalene-1-sulfonic acid
- Other names 8-(Phenylamino)naphthalene-1-sulfonic acid

Identifiers
CAS Number	82-76-8
3D model (JSmol)	Interactive image; Interactive image
ChEBI	CHEBI:39708
ChEMBL	ChEMBL285527
ChemSpider	1328
DrugBank	DB04474
ECHA InfoCard	100.001.308
KEGG	C11326
PubChem CID	1369
UNII	630I4V6051
CompTox Dashboard (EPA)	DTXSID7058882
- InChI: InChI=1S/C16H13NO3S/c18-21(19,20)15-11-5-7-12-6-4-10-14(16(12)15)17-13-8-2-1-3-9-13/h1-11,17H,(H,18,19,20) Key: FWEOQOXTVHGIFQ-UHFFFAOYSA-N; InChI=1/C16H13NO3S/c18-21(19,20)15-11-5-7-12-6-4-10-14(16(12)15)17-13-8-2-1-3-9-13/h1-11,17H,(H,18,19,20) Key: FWEOQOXTVHGIFQ-UHFFFAOYAB
- SMILES: O=S(=O)(O)c2c1c(cccc1ccc2)Nc3ccccc3; c1ccc(cc1)Nc2cccc3c2c(ccc3)S(=O)(=O)O

Properties
Chemical formula	C_{16}H_{13}NO_{3}S
Molar mass	299.34 g·mol^{−1}
- Except where otherwise noted, data are given for materials in their standard state (at 25 °C [77 °F], 100 kPa). verify (what is ?) Infobox references

8-Anilinonaphthalene-1-sulfonic acid (ANS), also called 1-anilino-8-naphthalenesulfonate, is an organic compound containing both a sulfonic acid and an amine group. This compound is used as a fluorescent molecular probe. For example, ANS can be used to study conformational changes induced by ligand binding in proteins, as ANS's fluorescent properties will change as it binds to hydrophobic regions on the protein surface. Comparison of the fluorescence in the presence and absence of a particular ligand can thus give information about how the binding of the ligand changes the surface of the protein. Its permeability to mitochondrial membranes makes it particularly useful.
