= Franz Alt (painter) =

Austrian painter

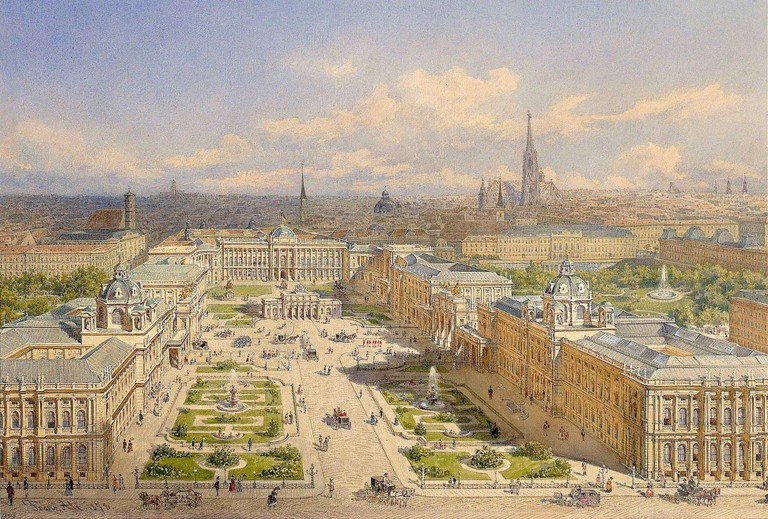
Der alte und der neue Burgplatz in Wien mit dem Projekt des Kaiserforums, 1873

Franz Alt (16 August 1821 in Vienna – 13 February 1914 in Vienna) was an Austrian landscape painter, son of Jakob Alt and the younger brother of Rudolf von Alt. His work is included in the collection of the Metropolitan Museum of Art, the Cooper Hewitt Museum (Smithsonian), the Albertina Museum, the Museum of Fine Arts, Budapest and other international collections.
