= Thomas Abt =

American author (born 1972)

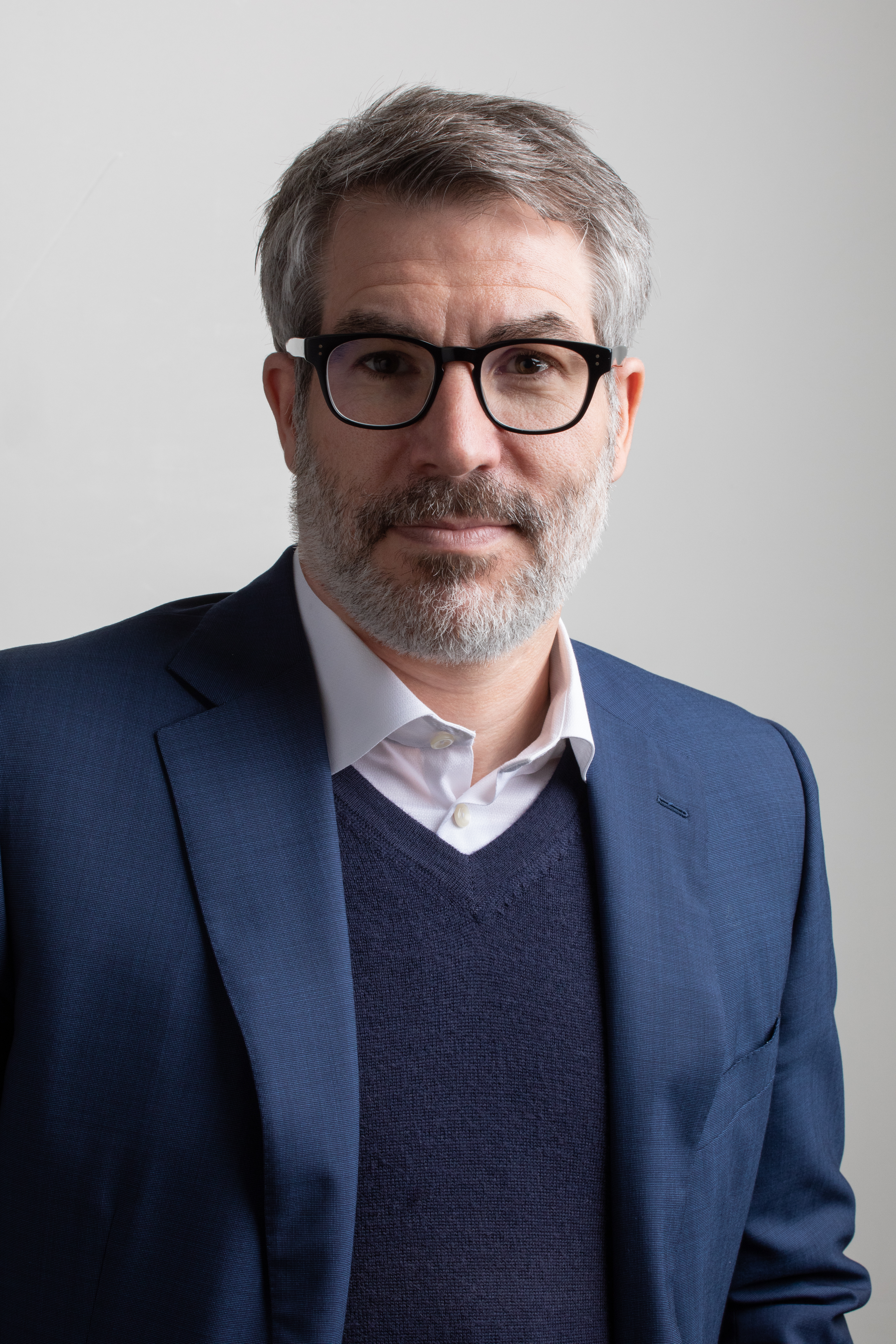
- Born: 1972 (age 53–54)

Academic background
- Education: University of Michigan (BA in economics); Georgetown University Law Center (JD)
- Thesis: The Representation of Three-dimensional Space in Mental Images

Academic work
- Discipline: Economics, law, criminology
- Website: ccjs.umd.edu/research/founding-director-thomas-abt

Thomas Abt (born 1972) is an American author, crime researcher, and former government official specializing in evidence-informed approaches to reducing crime in urban areas. His book, Bleeding Out: The Devastating Consequences of Urban Violence and a Bold New Plan for Peace in the Streets, was published in June 2019 by Basic Books.

== Early life ==
Abt grew up in Cambridge, Massachusetts. His father is Clark C. Abt, an MIT-trained engineer and founder of the social-science research firm Abt Associates and his mother, Wendy (née Peter) was educated at Harvard and is a banking and economic-development consultant.

== Education ==
Abt received his bachelor's degree in economics from the University of Michigan and a J.D. degree with honors from Georgetown University Law Center.

== Views on crime ==
Abt favors an approach to crime prevention that emphasizes eliminating violence directly, rather than focusing on its other associations, which include such things as poverty, gangs and drugs, and his 2019 book substantiates this claim with an extensive review of the data.

== Career ==
Abt began his career after graduating law school in 2000 as a prosecutor in the Manhattan district attorney's office for four years, then shifting to litigation as an associate with Paul, Weiss, Rifkind, Wharton & Garrison from 2004 to 2008. In 2008, Abt worked in Des Moines, Iowa on Barack Obama's campaign as director of voter protection.

Abt served as chief of staff to the Office of Justice Programs at the U.S. Department of Justice from 2010 to 2013. While there, he worked with the nation's principal criminal justice grant-making and research agencies to integrate evidence, policy, and practice. Abt also played a lead role in establishing the National Forum on Youth Violence Prevention, a network of federal agencies and local communities working together to reduce youth and gang violence. After that, he moved to the New York's Governor's Office, where he served from 2013 to 2014 as deputy secretary for public safety under Andrew Cuomo, overseeing all criminal justice and homeland security agencies. During his tenure, Abt led the development of New York's GIVE (Gun-Involved Violence Elimination) Initiative, which employs evidence-informed, data-driven approaches to reduce gun violence.

Since January 2020, Abt has been a senior fellow on the Council on Criminal Justice in Washington, D.C., where he directs its Violent Crime Working Group. He also served as director of CCJ's National Commission on COVID-19 and Criminal Justice. Prior to serving on the CCJ, he was a senior research fellow at the John F. Kennedy School of Government and a senior fellow at Harvard Law School. He is also a member of the Campbell Collaboration Criminal Justice Steering Committee. Abt is a former member of the advisory board of the Police Executive Programme at the University of Cambridge, and he is also a former senior fellow with the Igarapé Institute in Rio de Janeiro, Brazil.

In November 2022, it was announced that Abt would join the University of Maryland's department of criminology and criminal justice, where he would serve as an associate research professor and founding director of a new venture, the Center for the Study and Practice of Violence Reduction. The center will synthesize the latest research concerning community gun violence and make it available to policymakers, practitioners, and the public free of charge. The center will also provide guidance to federal, state, and local leaders on how best to apply anti-violence research in real-world scenarios.

Abt is a nationally recognized researcher and expert on crime. His work has been featured in The Atlantic, The Economist, Foreign Affairs, The New Yorker, The New York Times, The Wall Street Journal, and on MSNBC, PBS, National Public Radio, among other places. His TED talk on saving lives by stopping violence has been viewed more than 200,000 times. Abt also serves as a regular featured speaker at MPD's DC Police Leadership Academy.
