= Ant Simpson =

Ant Simpson is an Australian screenwriter and radio host best known for his time as co-host of the national Drive programme on the Australian Radio Network with co-hosts Anthony "Becks" Toohey and Sami Lukis.

== Career ==
Simpson started his radio career in 2006 while completing his law degree at the University of Melbourne. His first break in radio was a breakfast show on Star FM in Gippsland which he co-hosted with Anthony "Becks" Toohey. In 2007 the show was networked nationally as the Southern Cross Network drive program The Benchwarmers with Ant & Becks. The show was named "Best Network Program" two years in a row at the Australian Commercial Radio Awards (ACRAS).

In November 2009, Simpson & Toohey were poached by the Australian Radio Network to present Drive and commenced broadcasting in January 2010. In April 2012, Toohey announced that he had resigned from the show to pursue overseas projects. The show continued with Simpson and new co-host Sami Lukis.

Ant is a successful voice over artist who has voiced campaigns for 20th Century Fox, Mazda, McDonald's, Disney, Paramount Pictures, Universal Pictures, Foxtel and the Nova network of radio stations.
