= 1920 in the United States =

- Decades: 1900s; 1910s; 1920s; 1930s; 1940s
- See also: History of the United States (1918–1945); Timeline of United States history (1900–1929); List of years in the United States

Events from the year 1920 in the United States.

== Incumbents ==
=== Federal government ===
- President: Woodrow Wilson (D-New Jersey)
- Vice President: Thomas R. Marshall (D-Indiana)
- Chief Justice: Edward Douglass White (Louisiana)
- Speaker of the House of Representatives: Frederick H. Gillett (R-Massachusetts)
- Senate Majority Leader: Henry Cabot Lodge (R-Massachusetts) (starting March 4)
- Congress: 66th

==== State governments ====
Governors and lieutenant governors

=== Governors ===
- Governor of Alabama: Thomas Kilby (Democratic)
- Governor of Arizona: Thomas Edward Campbell (Republican)
- Governor of Arkansas: Charles Hillman Brough (Democratic)
- Governor of California: William Stephens (Republican)
- Governor of Colorado: Oliver Henry Shoup (Republican)
- Governor of Connecticut: Marcus H. Holcomb (Republican)
- Governor of Delaware: John G. Townsend, Jr. (Republican)
- Governor of Florida: Sidney Johnston Catts (Prohibition)
- Governor of Georgia: Hugh M. Dorsey (Democratic)
- Governor of Idaho: D. W. Davis (Republican)
- Governor of Illinois: Frank O. Lowden (Republican)
- Governor of Indiana: James P. Goodrich (Republican)
- Governor of Iowa: William L. Harding (Republican)
- Governor of Kansas: Henry J. Allen (Republican)
- Governor of Kentucky: Edwin P. Morrow (Republican)
- Governor of Louisiana: Ruffin G. Pleasant (Democratic) (until May 11), John M. Parker (Democratic) (starting May 11)
- Governor of Maine: Carl E. Milliken (Republican)
- Governor of Maryland: Emerson C. Harrington (Democratic) (until January 14), Albert C. Ritchie (Democratic) (starting January 14)
- Governor of Massachusetts: Calvin Coolidge (Republican)
- Governor of Michigan: Albert Sleeper (Republican)
- Governor of Minnesota: J. A. A. Burnquist (Republican)
- Governor of Mississippi: Theodore G. Bilbo (Democratic) (until January 18), Lee M. Russell (Democratic) (starting January 18)
- Governor of Missouri: Frederick D. Gardner (Democratic)
- Governor of Montana: Sam V. Stewart (Democratic)
- Governor of Nebraska: Samuel R. McKelvie (Republican)
- Governor of Nevada: Emmet D. Boyle (Democratic)
- Governor of New Hampshire: John H. Bartlett (Republican)
- Governor of New Jersey:
  - until January 13: William Nelson Runyon (Republican)
  - January 13–20: Clarence E. Case (Republican)
  - starting January 20: Edward I. Edwards (Democratic)
- Governor of New Mexico: Octaviano Ambrosio Larrazolo (Republican)
- Governor of New York: Al Smith (Democratic) (until end of December 31)
- Governor of North Carolina: Thomas Walter Bickett (Democratic)
- Governor of North Dakota: Lynn Frazier (Republican)
- Governor of Ohio: James M. Cox (Democratic)
- Governor of Oklahoma: James B. A. Robertson (Democratic)
- Governor of Oregon: Ben W. Olcott (Republican)
- Governor of Pennsylvania: William Cameron Sproul (Republican)
- Governor of Rhode Island: R. Livingston Beeckman (Republican)
- Governor of South Carolina: Robert Archer Cooper (Democratic)
- Governor of South Dakota: Peter Norbeck (Republican)
- Governor of Tennessee: A. H. Roberts (Democratic)
- Governor of Texas: William P. Hobby (Democratic)
- Governor of Utah: Simon Bamberger (Democratic)
- Governor of Vermont: Percival W. Clement (Republican)
- Governor of Virginia: Westmoreland Davis (Democratic)
- Governor of Washington: Louis Folwell Hart (Republican)
- Governor of West Virginia: John J. Cornwell (Democratic)
- Governor of Wisconsin: Emanuel L. Philipp (Republican)
- Governor of Wyoming: Robert D. Carey (Republican)

=== Lieutenant governors ===
- Lieutenant Governor of Alabama: Nathan Lee Miller (Democratic)
- Lieutenant Governor of California: Clement Calhoun Young (Republican)
- Lieutenant Governor of Colorado: George Stepham (Republican)
- Lieutenant Governor of Connecticut: Clifford B. Wilson (Republican)
- Lieutenant Governor of Delaware: vacant
- Lieutenant Governor of Idaho: Charles C. Moore (Republican)
- Lieutenant Governor of Illinois: John G. Oglesby (Republican)
- Lieutenant Governor of Indiana: Edgar D. Bush (Republican)
- Lieutenant Governor of Iowa: Ernest Robert Moore (Republican)
- Lieutenant Governor of Kansas: Charles S. Huffman (Republican)
- Lieutenant Governor of Kentucky: S. Thruston Ballard (Republican)
- Lieutenant Governor of Louisiana: Fernand Mouton (Democratic) (until month and day unknown), Hewitt Bouanchaud (Democratic) (starting month and day unknown)
- Lieutenant Governor of Massachusetts: Channing H. Cox (Republican)
- Lieutenant Governor of Michigan: Luren D. Dickinson (Republican)
- Lieutenant Governor of Minnesota: Thomas Frankson (Republican)
- Lieutenant Governor of Mississippi: Lee Maurice Russell (Democratic) (until January 18), Homer H. Casteel (Democratic) (starting January 18)
- Lieutenant Governor of Missouri: Wallace Crossley (Democratic)
- Lieutenant Governor of Montana: W. W. McDowell (Democratic)
- Lieutenant Governor of Nebraska: Pelham A. Barrows (Republican)
- Lieutenant Governor of Nevada: Maurice J. Sullivan (Democratic)
- Lieutenant Governor of New Mexico: Benjamin F. Pankey (Republican)
- Lieutenant Governor of New York: Harry C. Walker (Democratic) (until end of December 31)
- Lieutenant Governor of North Carolina: Oliver Max Gardner (Democratic)
- Lieutenant Governor of North Dakota: Howard R. Wood (Republican)
- Lieutenant Governor of Ohio: Clarence J. Brown Sr. (Republican)
- Lieutenant Governor of Oklahoma: Martin E. Trapp (Democratic)
- Lieutenant Governor of Pennsylvania: Edward E. Beidleman (Republican)
- Lieutenant Governor of Rhode Island: Emery J. San Souci (Republican)
- Lieutenant Governor of South Carolina: J. T. Liles (Democratic)
- Lieutenant Governor of South Dakota: William H. McMaster (Republican)
- Lieutenant Governor of Tennessee: Andrew L. Todd Sr. (Democratic)
- Lieutenant Governor of Texas: Willard Arnold Johnson (Democratic)
- Lieutenant Governor of Vermont: Mason S. Stone (Republican)
- Lieutenant Governor of Virginia: Benjamin Franklin Buchanan (Democratic)
- Lieutenant Governor of Washington: vacant
- Lieutenant Governor of Wisconsin: Edward F. Dithmar (Republican)

== Events ==
=== January ===
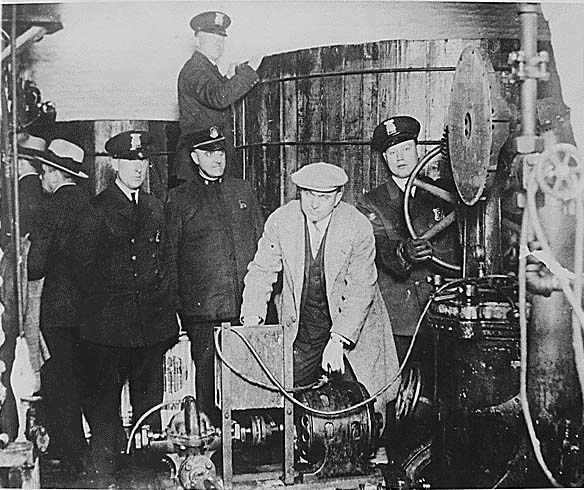
January 16: Prohibition in the United States begins.

- January 2 – First Red Scare: The second of the Palmer Raids takes place with another 4,025 suspected communists and anarchists arrested and held without trial in several cities.
- January 5 – 1920 United States census count begins. This becomes the first census to record a population exceeding 100 million, at 106,021,537. Because there are so many mixed-race persons and because so many Americans with some black ancestry appear white, the Census Bureau stops counting mixed-race peoples and the one-drop rule becomes the national legal standard.
- January 6 – Babe Ruth's December 26 trade to the New York Yankees is made public. (See 1919 in the United States.)
- January 7 – The New York State Assembly refuses to seat five duly elected Socialist assemblymen.
- January 9 – Thousands of onlookers watch as "The Human Fly" George Polley climbs New York City's Woolworth Building. He reaches the 30th floor when a policeman arrests him for climbing without a permit.
- January 13 – The New York Times ridicules the American rocket scientist Robert H. Goddard. (Decades later, on July 17, 1969, as the Apollo 11 crew head to the Moon, the newspaper will retract this editorial.)
- January 16 – Zeta Phi Beta sorority, is founded on the campus of Howard University in Washington, D.C.
- January 17 – Prohibition in the United States begins with the Eighteenth Amendment to the Constitution coming into effect.
- January 19
  - The United States Senate votes against joining the League of Nations.
  - The American Civil Liberties Union (ACLU) is founded.
  - Oahu sugar strike of 1920 begins.
- January 30 – A professional wrestling match in which Joe Stecher defeats Earl Caddock at New York City's Madison Square Garden is filmed by Pioneer Film Corporation for later viewing by cinema audiences; this is the oldest surviving movie of a pro wrestling match.

=== February ===
- February 14 – The League of Women Voters is founded in Chicago.

=== March ===
- March 1 – The United States Railroad Administration returns control of American railroads to its constituent railroad companies.
- March 10 – The Baylor Business Men's Club changes its name to the Baylor University Chamber of Commerce.
- March 19 – United States Congress refuses to ratify the Treaty of Versailles.
- March 28 – The 1920 Palm Sunday tornado outbreak hits the Great Lakes region and Deep South states.

=== April ===
- April 28 – Monongahela National Forest is established.

=== May ===
- May 1 – 1920 Major League Baseball season: The Brooklyn Robins and the Boston Braves play to a 1–1 tie in 26 innings, recording the longest single game in MLB history.
- May 2 – The first game of the Negro National League baseball is played in Indianapolis, Indiana.

=== June ===
- June 11 – During the 1920 Republican National Convention in Chicago, party leaders gather in a "smoke-filled room" of The Blackstone Hotel to decide their presidential candidate.
- June 13 – The U.S. Post Office rules that children may not be sent via parcel post.
- June 14 – Cherokee National Forest is established.
- June 15 – 1920 Duluth lynchings: Three African Americans are sprung from jail and lynched by a white mob in Duluth, Minnesota.
- June 21 – The 4.9 M_{L} Inglewood earthquake shakes the Los Angeles Area with a maximum Mercalli intensity of VIII (Severe), causing more than $100,000 in damage.
- June 28 – Sigma Tau Gamma Fraternity, Incorporated is founded in Warrensburg, Missouri.

=== July ===
- July 1 – The Oahu Sugar Strike of 1920 ends.
- July 6 – Lynching of Irving and Herman Arthur in Paris, Texas.
- July 29 – The United States Bureau of Reclamation begins construction of the Link River Dam as part of the Klamath Reclamation Project.

=== August ===
- August 1–6 – Denver streetcar strike of 1920
- August 20
  - The first commercial radio station in the U.S., 8MK (WWJ), owned by the Detroit News, begins operations in Detroit, Michigan.
  - The National Football League is founded as the American Professional Football Conference (renamed September 17 as 'Association').
- August 26 – Nineteenth Amendment to the United States Constitution is passed, guaranteeing women's suffrage.

=== September ===
- September 16 – The Wall Street bombing: a bomb in a horse wagon explodes in front of the J. P. Morgan Building in New York City – 38 dead, 400 injured.
- September 29 – First domestic radio sets come to stores in the U.S. – Westinghouse radio costs $10.

=== October–November ===
- November 2
  - 1920 United States presidential election: Republican U. S. Senator Warren G. Harding defeats Democratic Governor of Ohio James M. Cox. The 1920 presidential election would be the first national U.S. election in which women have the right to vote.
  - KDKA (AM) of Pittsburgh, Pennsylvania (owned by Westinghouse) starts broadcasting as a commercial radio station. The first broadcast is the results of the presidential election.
- November 2–3 – Ocoee massacre occurs.

=== December ===
- December 25 – Foundation of the Rosicrucian Fellowship's Spiritual Healing Temple "The Ecclesia" at Mount Ecclesia, Oceanside, California.

=== Undated ===
- Black Cross Nurses founded.
- Van Wyck Brooks publishes The Ordeal of Mark Twain, arguing that Twain's genius was twisted by the conditions and culture of late 19th-century America. This begins a reassessment of Twain, who has been seen hitherto mainly as a humorous entertainer, and his contemporaries.

=== Ongoing ===
- Progressive Era (1890s–1920s)
- Lochner era (c. 1897–c. 1937)
- U.S. occupation of Haiti (1915–1934)
- U.S. occupation of the Dominican Republic (1916-1924)
- First Red Scare (1917–1920)
- Prohibition (1920–1933)
- Depression of 1920–21 (1920–1921)
- Roaring Twenties (1920–1929)

== Sport ==
- January 1 – Harvard Crimson win their First Rose Bowl by defeating the Oregon Webfoots 7 to 6 in the 1920 Rose Bowl.
- October 12 – Cleveland Indians win their first (and last until 1948) World Series by defeating the Brooklyn Robins 5 games to 2; the deciding game 7 is played at League Park in Cleveland.
- December 19 – Akron Pros are awarded the First American Professional Football Association Championship.

== Births ==
=== January ===
- January 1 – Pete Turnham, American politician (died 2019)
- January 4 – Cris Alexander, actor, singer, dancer, designer and photographer (died 2012)
- January 6 – Early Wynn, baseball player (died 1999)
- January 8
  - Richard Benedict, actor and director (died 1984)
  - Gordon Kahl, tax protester and cop-killer (died 1983)
- January 10 – Max Patkin, baseball player and clown (died 1999)
- January 12 – James Farmer, civil rights leader (died 1999)
- January 15
  - Bob Davies, basketball player and coach (died 1990)
  - Joseph Mendenhall, ambassador (died 2013)
  - John O'Connor, Catholic cardinal (died 2000)
- January 16
  - Al Morgan, novelist and television producer (died 2011)
  - Elliott Reid, actor (died 2013)
  - Walter Frederick Morrison, entrepreneur and inventor (died 2010)
- January 19 – Buddy O'Grady, basketball player, coach (died 1992)
- January 20
  - DeForest Kelley, screen actor (died 1999)
  - Lewis Wilson, actor (died 2000)
- January 24 – Jerry Maren, actor (died 2018)
- January 30 – Delbert Mann, television and film director (died 2007)
- January 31 – James Yimm Lee, martial arts pioneer, teacher, author and publisher (died 1972)

=== February ===
- February 3
  - Russell Arms, American actor and singer (died 2012)
  - Henry Heimlich, thoracic surgeon (died 2016)
  - George Armitage Miller, psychologist (died 2012)
- February 8 – George W. George, theater, Broadway and film producer (died 2007)
- February 11 – Billy Halop, actor (died 1976)
- February 12
  - William Roscoe Estep, Baptist historian (died 2000)
  - Bill Pitman, musician (died 2022)
- February 17 – Annie Glenn, disability, communication disorder activist (died 2020)
- February 18
  - Bill Cullen, game show host (died 1990)
  - Eddie Slovik, U.S. Army private (died 1945)
- February 20 – Kathleen Cavendish, Marchioness of Hartington ("Kick" Kennedy), socialite (killed in aviation accident 1948)
- February 22 – Burt L. Talcott, American politician (died 2016)
- February 26 – Tony Randall, actor (died 2004)
- February 29 – Howard Nemerov, poet (died 1991)

=== March ===
- March 4 – George W. Landau, diplomat (died 2018)
- March 5 – Del Latta, politician (died 2016)
- March 10 – Thomas J. White, construction company executive and philanthropist (died 2011)
- March 14 – Hank Ketcham, cartoonist (died 2001)
- March 15
  - Lawrence Sanders, novelist (died 1998)
  - E. Donnall Thomas, physician, recipient of the Nobel Prize in Physiology or Medicine (died 2012)
- March 20 – Pamela Harriman, English-born U.S. Ambassador to France (died 1997)
- March 27 – William Moncrief, oil executive (died 2021)

=== April ===
- April 1 – Harry Lewis, actor and businessman (died 2013)
- April 2 – Jack Webb, television actor, director and producer (died 1982)
- April 5 – Arthur Hailey, writer (died 2004)
- April 6 – Edmond H. Fischer, Swiss American biochemist, recipient of the Nobel Prize in Physiology or Medicine (died 2021)
- April 12 – Buck Young, actor (died 2000)
- April 13 – Jack Lambert, actor (died 2002)
- April 19
  - Gene Leis, guitarist, composer, and producer (died 1993)
  - Marvin Mandel, lawyer and politician, 56th Governor of Maryland (died 2015)
  - John O'Neil, baseball player and manager (died 2012)
  - Marian Winters, actress (died 1978)
- April 20 – Ronald Speirs, colonel (died 2007)
- April 29 – Harold Shapero, composer (died 2013)

=== May ===
- May 7 – James B. Pearson, U.S. Senator from Kansas from 1962 to 1978 (died 2009)
- May 8
  - Saul Bass, graphic designer (died 1996)
  - Sloan Wilson, author and poet (died 2003)
- May 10 – Jeff Cooper, soldier and journalist (died 2006)
- May 11
  - Gene Hermanski, baseball player (died 2010)
  - Denver Pyle, actor (died 1997)
- May 23 – Helen O'Connell, singer (died 1993)
- May 26 – Peggy Lee, singer (died 2002)
- May 28 – Gene Levitt, television writer, producer and director (died 1999)
- May 30 – Franklin Schaffner, film and television director (died 1989)

=== June ===
- June 2 – Tex Schramm, American football executive (died 2003)
- June 11
  - Irving Howe, literary and social critic (died 1993)
  - Robert Hutton, actor (died 1994)
  - Shelly Manne, American drummer, composer, and bandleader (died 1984)
- June 12
  - Dave Berg, cartoonist (died 2002)
  - Jim Siedow, actor (died 2003)
  - William Woodward, Jr., banker and racehorse owner (mariticide 1955)
- June 22
  - Paul Frees, voice actor (died 1986)
  - Jack Karwales, American football player (died 2004)
  - Walt Masterson, baseball pitcher (died 2008)
  - Lester Wunderman, executive (died 2019)
- June 25 – Ozan Marsh, pianist (died 1992)
- June 29 – Ray Harryhausen, animator (died 2013)

=== July ===
- July 4
  - Norm Drucker, basketball player and referee (died 2015)
  - Leona Helmsley, born Lena Rosenthal, businesswoman and tax evader (died 2007)
- July 5 – Viola Harris, American actress (d. 2017)
- July 7
  - Sandy Tatum, golfer (d. 2017)
  - William Thaddeus Coleman Jr., attorney, politician (d. 2017)
  - Henry Williams Hise, U.S. General (d. 2010)
- July 9 – Robert H. B. Baldwin, banker and Under Secretary of the Navy (died 2016)
- July 10 – Owen Chamberlain, physicist, Nobel Prize laureate (died 2006)
- July 11 – Yul Brynner, Russian-born actor (died 1985)
- July 15 – Theresa Kobuszewski, underhand baseball pitcher (died 2005)
- July 16
  - Henry Williams Hise, Marine Corps Brigadier General (died 2010)
  - Larry Jansen, baseball pitcher, coach (died 2009)
  - Phillip Pine, screen actor (died 2006)
  - Ulysses S. Washington, American college football player and coach (died 2018)
- July 19 – Robert Mann, violinist (died 2018)
- July 24 – Bella Abzug, politician (died 1998)

=== August ===
- August 1
  - Thomas McGuire, World War II fighter ace (died 1945)
  - Jack Briggs, actor (died 1998)
- August 2 – Bill Scott, voice actor and writer (died 1985)
- August 3 – Earl Killian, college sports coach and athletic director (died 2022)
- August 4
  - Warren Plunkett, American football player (d. 2018)
  - Helen Thomas, American author, news service reporter, member of the White House press corps and columnist (d. 2013)
- August 6 – Ella Raines, screen actress (died 1988)
- August 8 – Jimmy Witherspoon, singer (died 1997)
- August 10
  - Ann Harnett, baseball player (died 2006)
  - Red Holzman, basketball coach (died 1998)
- August 11 – Clifford E. Dorr, Wisconsin politician (died 1978)
- August 13 – Neville Brand, actor and combat soldier (died 1992)
- August 14 – Gorham Getchell, basketball and baseball player (died 1980)
- August 16 – Charles Bukowski, writer (died 1994)
- August 18
  - Bob Kennedy, baseball player and manager (died 2005)
  - Shelley Winters, actress (died 2006)
- August 22 – Ray Bradbury, science-fiction writer (died 2012)
- August 23 – Jim Leavelle, American detective (died 2019)
- August 24
  - Herbert Haft, owner of Dart Drugs Chain (died 2004)
  - J. Paul Taylor, politician (died 2023)
- August 26 – Richard E. Bellman, mathematician (died 1984)
- August 29
  - Charlie Parker, saxophonist and composer (died 1955)
  - Herb Simpson, baseball player (died 2015)

=== September ===
- September 1 – Richard Farnsworth, actor, stuntman (died 2000)
- September 3 – Sterling Lord, literary agent and editor (died 2022)
- September 5 – Apolonia Muñoz Abarca, health professional and reproductive rights advocate (died 2009)
- September 7 – Al Caiola, guitarist and composer (died 2016)
- September 8 – Lawrence LeShan, psychologist (died 2020)
- September 13 – Alan Sagner, politician and public servant (died 2018)
- September 14
  - Don Johnson, American football player (died 1965)
  - Lawrence Klein, economist, recipient of the Nobel Memorial Prize in Economic Sciences in 1980 (died 2013)
- September 15 – Dave Garcia, baseball coach, manager (died 2018)
- September 17 – Marjorie Holt, politician (died 2018)
- September 18 – Jack Warden, actor (died 2006)
- September 19 – Roger Angell, journalist, author, and editor (died 2022)
- September 20 - Jay Ward, television animator, writer and producer (died 1989)
- September 22 – William H. Riker, political scientist (died 1993)
- September 23 – Mickey Rooney, film actor (died 2014)
- September 24
  - Richard Bong, fighter ace (killed in aviation accident 1945)
  - Harber H. Hall, politician (died 2020)
- September 27 – William Conrad, actor (died 1994)
- September 30 – Milton P. Rice, politician (died 2018)

=== October ===
- October 1 – Walter Matthau, film actor (died 2000)
- October 8 – Frank Herbert, science-fiction writer (died 1986)
- October 10 – Gail Halvorsen, US Air Force officer (died 2022)
- October 15
  - Chris Economaki, sportscaster and actor (died 2012)
  - Mario Puzo, novelist (died 1999)
- October 17 – Montgomery Clift, film actor (died 1966)
- October 20 – Janet Jagan, President of Guyana from 1997 to 1999 (died 2009)
- October 22 – Timothy Leary, psychologist and author (died 1996)
- October 25 – Guy M. Townsend, American Air Force brigadier general and test pilot (died 2011)
- October 29 – Benjamin F. McAdoo, architect (died 1981)

=== November ===
- November 4 – Val Heim, baseball player (died 2019)
- November 5
  - John H. Land, politician, long-serving mayor of Apopka, Florida (died 2014)
  - Douglass North, economist, recipient of the Nobel Memorial Prize in Economic Sciences in 1993 (died 2015)
- November 8
  - Esther Rolle, African-American television actress (died 1998)
  - Wally Westlake, baseball player (died 2019)
- November 11 – Paul Ignatius, govrrnment officia; and businessman (died 2025)
- November 13
  - Jack Elam, screen Western actor (died 2003)
  - Edward Hughes, Catholic bishop (died 2012)
  - Georg Olden, African-American graphic designer (died 1975)
- November 19 – Gene Tierney, actress (died 1991)
- November 21
  - Ralph Meeker, actor (dIed 1988)
  - Stan Musial, baseball player (died 2013)
- November 29 – Bob Wolff, sportscaster (died 2017)
- November 30 – Virginia Mayo, film actress (died 2005)

=== December ===
- December 5 – Poldine Carlo, author (died 2018)
- December 6 – Dave Brubeck, jazz pianist and composer (died 2012)
- December 14
  - Frank T. Cary, businessman (died 2006)
  - Clark Terry, swing and bebop trumpeter and composer (died 2015)
- December 15
  - Bernice Falk Haydu, aviator (died 2021)
  - Eddie Robinson, baseball player (died 2021)
- December 19
  - Little Jimmy Dickens, country music singer-songwriter (died 2015)
  - David Susskind, producer and talk show host (died 1987)
- December 21
  - Iris Cummings, Olympic swimmer and aviator (died 2025)
  - Adele Goldstine, mathematician (died 1964)
  - Harold Lang, dancer and actor (died 1985)
  - J. Roderick MacArthur, businessman and philanthropist (died 1984)
- December 30 – Jack Lord, actor (died 1998)
- December 31 – Rex Allen, screen actor, singer and songwriter, "the Arizona Cowboy" (d. 1999)

== Deaths ==
- January 8 – Maud Powell, violinist (born 1867)
- January 14 – John Francis Dodge, automobile manufacturer (born 1864)
- January 16 – Reginald De Koven, composer, conductor and critic (born 1859)
- February 2 – Field Eugene Kindley, World War I aviator (born 1896)
- February 3 – Frank Brown, 42nd Governor of Maryland from 1892 to 1896 (born 1846)
- February 15 – Joseph Burton Sumner, founder of Sumner, Mississippi (born 1837)
- February 20
  - Joseph J. Fern, Mayor of Honolulu from 1909 to 1915 and from 1917 to 1920 (born 1872)
  - Robert Peary, Arctic explorer (born 1856)
- February 27 – William Sherman Jennings, 18th Governor of Florida from 1901 to 1905 (born 1863)
- March 1
  - John H. Bankhead, U.S. Senator from Alabama from 1907 to 1920 (born 1842)
  - William A. Stone, 22nd Governor of Pennsylvania from 1899 to 1903 (born 1846)
- March 4 – Roswell P. Bishop, U.S. Representative from Michigan from 1895 to 1907 (born 1843)
- March 13 – Mary Devens, photographer (born 1857)
- March 14 – Henry W. Blair, U.S. Senator from New Hampshire from 1879 to 1891 (born 1834)
- March 26
  - Samuel Colman, painter and designer (born 1832)
  - William Chester Minor, surgeon (born 1834)
- March 31 – Edwin Warfield, 45th Governor of Maryland from 1904 to 1908 (born 1848)
- April 3 – Mary Katharine Brandegee, botanist (born 1844)
- April 6 – Mary Evelyn Hitchcock, author and explorer (born 1849)
- April 8
  - John Brashear, astronomer (born 1840)
  - Charles Griffes, composer (born 1884)
- April 12 – Walter Edwards, film director (born 1870)
- April 21 – Maria L. Sanford, educator (born 1836)
- April 25 – Clarine Seymour, actress (born 1898)
- May 11 – William Dean Howells, novelist (born 1837)
- May 10 – John Wesley Hyatt, inventor (born 1837)
- May 16 – Levi P. Morton, 22nd vice president of the United States from 1889 to 1893 (born 1824)
- May 21 – Eleanor H. Porter, novelist (born 1868)
- June 5 – Julia A. Moore, poet (born 1847)
- June 11 – Esther G. Frame, Quaker minister and evangelist (born 1840)
- June 18 – Jewett W. Adams, 4th Governor of Nevada from 1883 to 1887 (born 1835)
- July 2 – William Louis Marshall, general and engineer (born 1846)
- July 6 – Andrew Traynor, soldier (born 1843)
- July 17 – Charles E. Courtney, rower and coach (born 1849)
- July 22 – William Kissam Vanderbilt, heir (born 1849)
- August 1 – Frank Hanly, 26th Governor of Indiana from 1905 to 1909 (born 1863)
- August 2 – Ormer Locklear, pilot (born 1891)
- August 6 – Edward Francis Searles, interior designer (born 1841)
- August 9 – Melvin O. Adams, attorney and railroad executive (born 1847)
- August 10 – James O'Neill, actor (born 1847 in Ireland)
- August 12 – Walter W. Winans, sculptor, painter, marksman and horse-breeder (born 1852)
- August 17 – Ray Chapman, baseball player (born 1891)
- August 26 – James Wilson, politician (born 1835 in Scotland)
- September 5 – Robert Harron, actor (born 1893)
- September 10 – Olive Thomas, silent film actress (born 1894)
- October 2 – Winthrop M. Crane, 40th Governor of Massachusetts from 1900 to 1903 and U.S. Senator from Massachusetts from 1904 to 1913 (born 1853)
- October 17 – John Reed, journalist, in Moscow (born 1887)
- November 2 – Louise Imogen Guiney, poet and essayist (born 1861)
- November 3 – Warren Terhune, United States Navy Commander and 13th Governor of American Samoa (born 1869)
- November 7 – Amelie Veiller Van Norman, educator and civic reformer (born 1844 in France)
- November 25 – Madeline McDowell Breckinridge, women's suffrage campaigner (born 1872)
- November 30 – Eugene W. Chafin, politician (born 1852)
- December 9 – Mollie McConnell, actress (born 1865)
- December 14
  - George J. Gaskin, "silver-voiced Irish tenor" (born 1863 in Ireland)
  - George Gipp, American football player (born 1895)
- December 18 – Casimiro Barela, politician, member of the Colorado Senate (born 1847)
- December 24 – Stephen Mosher Wood, politician (born 1832)

== See also ==
- List of American films of 1920
- Timeline of United States history (1900–1929)
