= Economic Development in Rural Western North Carolina =

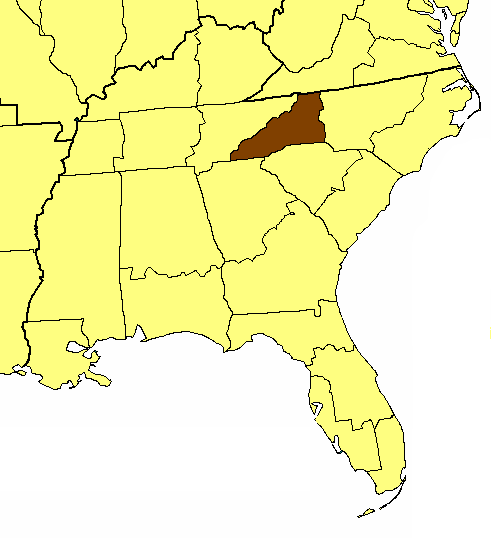
ECUSA Western North Carolina

Rural Economic Development in North Carolina is analogous to other areas as the focus of said projects are to facilitate a higher standard of economic activity to a specified area. In these designated areas citizens, interest groups, business owners, and policymakers work together in order to formulate long-term economic goals and strategies to meet those goals. There are many different avenues and forms an economic development project can take dependent on the desired outcome.

== History ==
Throughout the nineteenth and twentieth centuries, life drastically changed for the citizens of North Carolina. What was once a rural state branded by natural resource exploitation and simple crop cultivation, it has formed a burgeoning labor structure characterized by high capital investment, industrial production, and service provision. From the dark hollows of Murphy, North Carolina to the windy coastal dunes of Nags Head, North Carolina, this socio-economic transformation could be witnessed throughout time. Said proliferation of labor and investment opportunities served to be a magnate for individuals to migrate into the state. During this golden age of growth though, North Carolina's local governments and citizens myopically viewed industries as completely stable means of labor opportunity. Over time, individuals and families within mill and factory towns grew highly dependent upon these jobs and often only invested time, education, and training towards their single industry. This trend was especially evident within the smaller rural communities of North Carolina. It was through these industries' departure that these communities and governments met the harsh reality of the dangers of a homogeneous economic base. In order to assuage the harsh conditions.

== Notable regional economic development entities in rural WNC ==
- The Rural Center of North Carolina
- United States Department of Agriculture Rural Development
- The North Carolina School of Government
- Advantage West
- County and City Economic Development Entities

== The Rural Center ==
Founded in 1987, The North Carolina Rural Center was established to aid rural communities in economic advancement. It was because of this narrow mission, that the General Assembly looked towards the Rural Center to assuage the growing unemployment problem in North Carolina. But with a changing economic climate, and rising social and political urgency, the organization realized that there needed to be some restructuring of the organization's methods and strategies, if the needs of the state's citizens were to be fulfilled.

Between 2004 and 2005, members of the North Carolina State Legislature sought out the aid of The Rural Center, in order to undergo a study that was to evaluate the state of North Carolina's small rural towns. This formal community analysis was to be conducted in order to give state legislators invaluable insight into their constituents' demographic statistics, and their communities' strengths, weaknesses, threats, and opportunities. With the research project underway, representatives Joe Sam Queen of Waynesville, and Walter Dalton of Rutherfordton desired to further expand upon the efforts of The Rural Center in economic development. Through this desire, they initiated and sponsored the creation of the NC STEP Program, which was to be the new muscle of the Rural Center.

Small Towns Initiative Adopted on November 4, 2005, the Small Towns Initiative was established by the North Carolina Rural Center, with the mission to incite and facilitate positive economic change and growth within North Carolina's rural small towns. Spearheaded by Lieutenant Governor Bev Perdue, this new policy came into effect in order to make the Rural Center more efficient in providing their services. This policy was created in order to streamline the Rural Center's approach towards economic development, while adjusting some of the shortcomings the organization had under their old strategy. With the implementation of this initiative, The Rural Center postulated that the overall quality of life of North Carolinians would be amplified if real economic growth was realized.

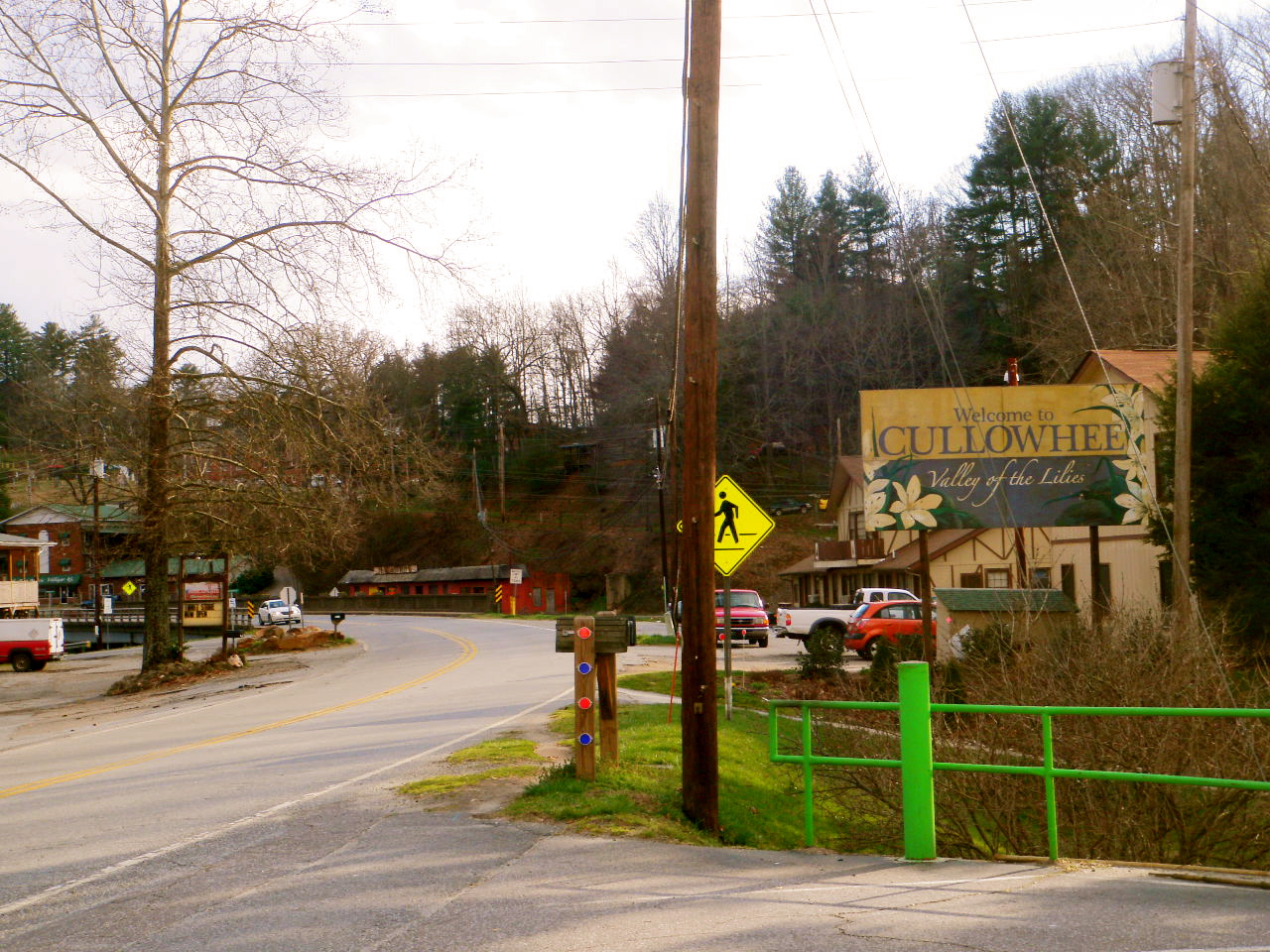
Entering Cullowhee NC

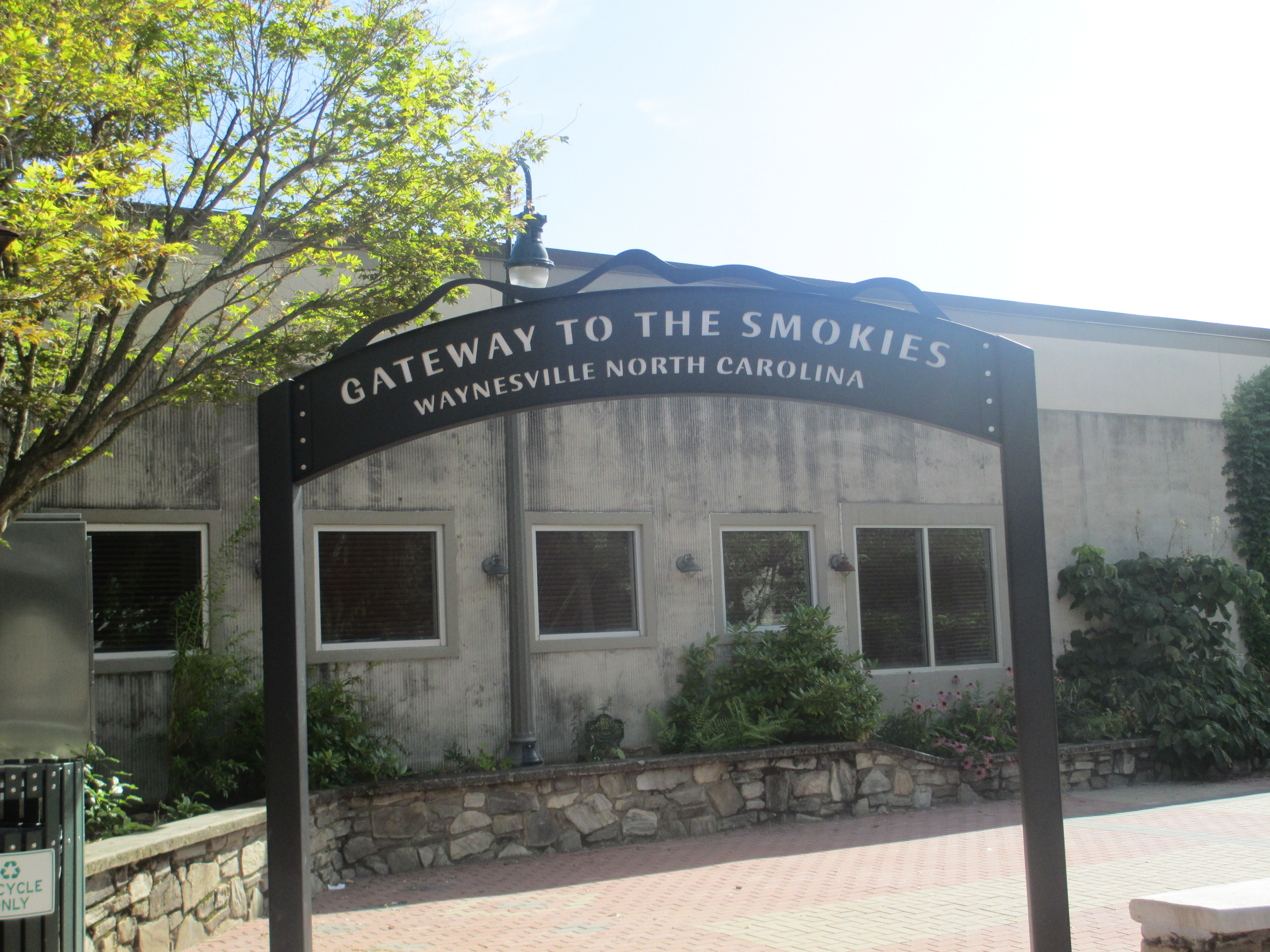
Waynesville, NC sign IMG 5165

=== Programs ===
Business programs

1. Agricultural Advancement Consortium
2. Small Business Credit Initiative
3. Institute for Rural Entrepreneurship
4. Micro-enterprise Loan Program

Community programs

1. Building Reuse
2. Community Development Corporations
3. Rural Hope, A Healthcare Program
4. NC Small Towns Prosperity Program (NCSTEP)
5. Workforce Development

Leadership and engagement

1. Leadership Training
2. Rural Partners Series
3. Youth Initiative

=== Community implementation (economic development case studies) ===
Within the mountains of Western North Carolina, fourteen communities and three cluster demonstration sites have sought out the initiative. Many of these communities, such as Canton, Old Fort, Robbinsville, and Marshall, enrolled into the program early, so they have since finished the program. Thus, their stories can be analyzed to study how the Small Towns Initiative was implemented in these communities.

Canton

For many, Canton, North Carolina is a small rural town that is often negatively remembered for an assault on the olfactory senses that one must endure when traveling to Asheville, North Carolina. For those individuals who live within the community, there is a much different perspective of the town. To their community, Canton is a strong and productive place, where individuals overcome obstacles that may seem unconquerable to others. This sense of pride has always been within the hearts of the community, but was amplified in the aftermath of Hurricanes Ivan and Hurricane Francis. As many know, Canton was inundated by the waters that came with the hurricanes of 2004. This led to 9.2 million dollars in damages to the town's small businesses, which ultimately led 192 of them to close down or uproot, thus leaving 370 individuals without jobs. Under the guidance of a Rural Center-appointed team coach, Canton formulated and adopted a long-term master-plan to repair their damaged economy. Under this newly adopted plan, the town is now focusing on improving their aging and dilapidated infrastructure. Also on the community agenda is the plan to enact downtown building beautification and restoration projects. These projects were to be realized by heavy investing both by Canton and though The Rural Center's grant programs.

Old Fort

Another town that can be used to observe how the Small Towns Initiative implements its NC Step Program, is the small town of Old Fort, North Carolina. Incorporated in 1872, Old Fort grew into a productive society that was well known for its American Revolutionary historic influence. The presence of a recreated revolutionary fort, served the town as the main economic engine for most of the early 1900s. With time though, tourists seemed to lose interest in the attraction and tourism began to decline. Another factor that led to Old Fort's economic decline was the closure of two major employers, which were a furniture factory and a textile mill. With unemployment rising without restraint, community leaders felt as though economic development was just driving by the town on Interstate-40. At this time many other communities such as: West Jefferson, Crossnore, Bakerville, and Todd were facing the same economic issues as Old Fort, but were working together to combat the problem. These towns and cities were analogous to Old Fort in many ways but their historical attributes and economic problems were almost parallel. It was through these similarities, that the Rural Center's community coach for Old Fort helped community leaders join The High Country Cluster, which was a regional economic development cluster that had previously been established by the Rural Center. By Old Fort joining the cluster, they were aided by other communities and their coach to adopt a long-term economic development plan, which would incite sustainable job growth through, heritage tourism, arts and crafts production, and secondary home development.

Robbinsville

Yet another town in the region that has sought out the benefits of The Small Towns Initiative is Robbinsville, North Carolina which is located in Graham County. Robbinsville was an extreme case for the Rural Center, because it had previously been distinguished as being located in a highly economically distressed Tier 1 County. The town was not always characterized in this way though. Once Robbinsville was well known for its natural aesthetic beauty and the city once enjoyed a highly lucrative tourism base and boasted one of the most traveled roads by motorcyclist, The Tail of The Dragon. But with time the factories and mills that provided a labor base for the community shut down and most development migrated to the US-129 Bypass. Income made from the motorcycling tourist market, proved to be insufficient for the shrinking economy, so the community drastically needed to make changes.

With the help of their community coach, the citizens of Robbinsville developed a plan that would pursue business development and job creation, while simultaneously preserving the town's character. Leaders placed natural resources and cultural heritage preservation as economic development tools by considering tourism and second home development as ways to boost their local economy. The promotion of these areas would involve downtown revitalization, and the enhancement of infrastructure to bolster population retention and growth, which would provide a larger more diverse capital base.

Marshall

The Town of Marshall, North Carolina also participated in the NC STEP because they were struggling to develop or even stay economically afloat. The way in which the Town of Marshall implemented the initiative differed slightly from that of the other towns though. While Marshall was assisted by a community coach, they also sought out the help of faculty and students from North Carolina State University. With this assistance, the community defined their vision for the growth out of the formation of "community charrettes." These were to be community leadership team committees, charged with the responsibility of working on specific projects, which were business resources and entrepreneurship, promotions and communications, and master planning.

== The USDA Rural Development Program ==
Since 2009 the USDA has invested $6.3 billion in rural housing and businesses development, utility construction, and other community programs across North Carolina. More than $1.6 billion was invested in 2012, in which over 8000 families were aided through the Single Family Housing Program. Also during this time 752 jobs were created or saved through Business & Cooperative Programs.

=== Business and Industry Loan Guarantees ===
This program provides loan guarantees if expansion and preservation of jobs in rural areas criteria are met. Loan guarantees are available to commercial lenders of whom make credit available for business activity in rural areas with populations up to 50,000. The funds received from this program may be used to purchase land, buildings and equipment, and working capital. Funds received may also be used to refinance debts.

=== Intermediary Re-lending Program ===
Through this program, loans are made available to private nonprofit corporations, state or local governments, Native American tribes, or cooperatives of whom provide credit to finance business facilities and economic development projects in rural areas. These work on a revolving loan basis.

=== Rural Business Opportunity Grants ===
These Grants provide funding for technical assistance and training, as well as planning activities.

=== Rural Business Enterprise Grants ===
These grants finance the development of small and emerging private business enterprises in rural areas.

=== Rural Economic Development Loans and Grants ===
The purpose of this grant system is to develop projects that will result in job creation and higher income levels in rural areas. Applicable projects to these grants range from business start-ups and expansion, to medical training projects.

=== Cooperative Services Technical Assistance ===
This program assists residents in rural areas in inciting new cooperative business networks, while also maintaining and improving existing cooperatives.

=== Rural Cooperative Development Grants ===
These grants are given for the establishment of operation centers for cooperative development.

=== Value-added Program Grants ===
This participatory program enables producers of specific agricultural commodities to encounter the economic returns to be made in the value-added market.

== NC School of Government ==
=== Publications ===
Small Towns Big Ideas, NC School of Government

This packet provides community leaders with avenues for economic development and brings development theories and ideas to life through the usage of case studies. Within this text, there are forty-five studies of communities that underwent successful economic development projects, which varied widely in approach but all led to economic growth.

=== Courses ===
This four-day annual course provides introductory instruction and training for economic development professionals employed by public, civic, private development agencies, and any other individuals pursuing the field. The course is also appropriate for experienced professionals of whom are seeking to update knowledge and skills. This course instructs the fundamentals of economic development practices. The course operates in a manner in which the theoretical and practical meet. By the end of the course it is the goal of the SOG to provide individuals enrolled in the class with the skill-set needed to set proper agendas, formulate affective policy, and implement correctly economic development programs.

== Advantage West, Economic Development Group ==
Certified Entrepreneurial Communities Program (CEC)

=== Certified Communities ===
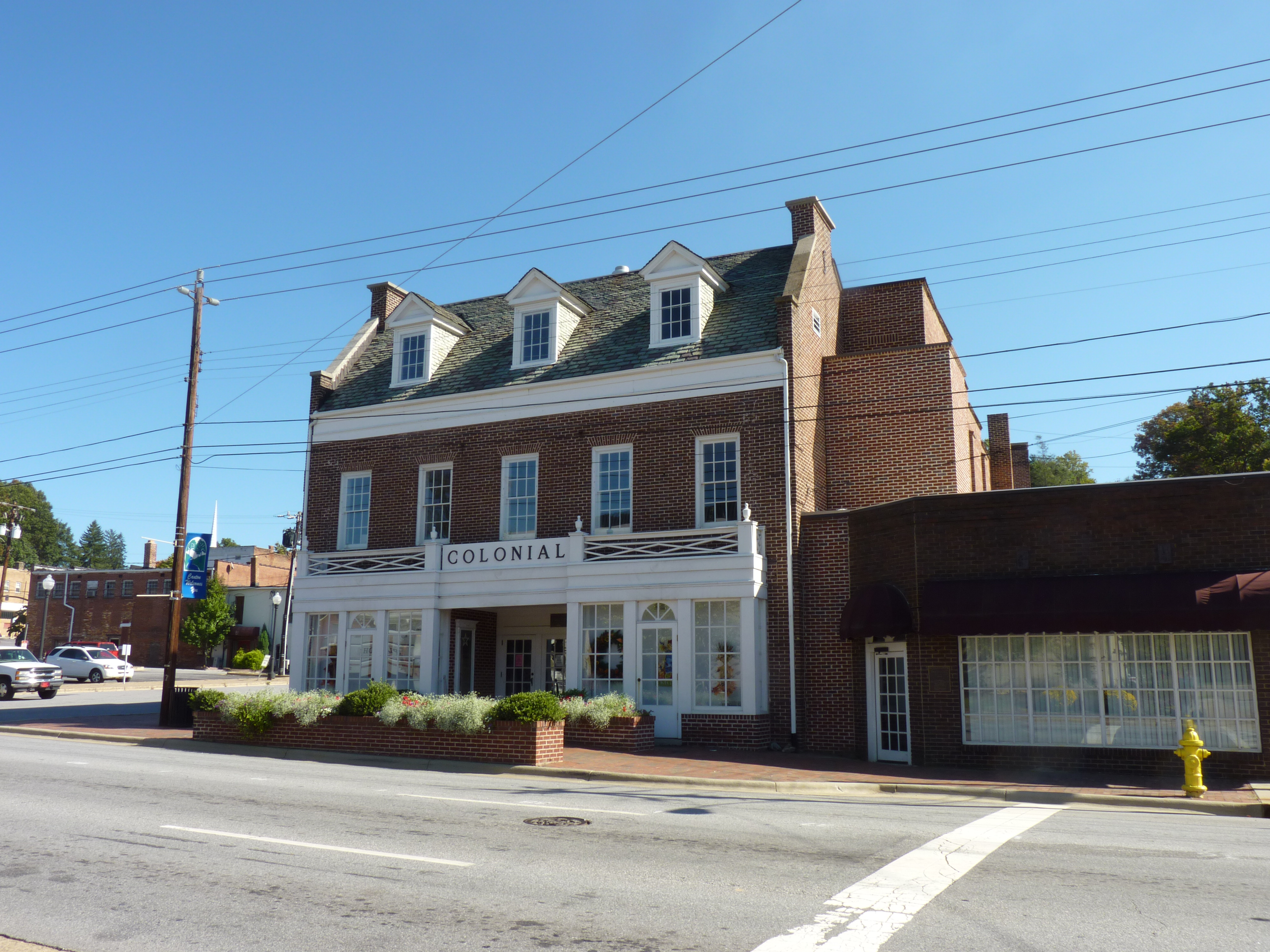
Colonial Theater - Canton NC

1. Black Mountain
2. Burke County
3. Eastern Band of Cherokee Indians
4. Haywood County
5. Macon County
6. Mitchell County
7. Polk County
8. Transylvania County
9. Watauga County
10. Yancey County

=== Purpose ===
The CEC program provided by Advantage West aids communities within western North Carolina formulate goals and strategies pertaining to economic development. Communities that finish the program garner many benefits such as distinguishing signs, advertisement tools such as community profile videos and posters, and much more. With this certification comes much more than a title and a sign as one drives into the county. The certification is meant to be representative of a total reconstruction of how a community views economic development. Above policy change, the certification serves an even greater function, this is to foster economic growth by way of community involvement and action. Hence the goal is to make a local government only a facilitator in the process, the real and affective economic development occurs from the interaction of the community with existing and prospective businesses.
