= Hise (name) =

Hise or Van Hise can be a masculine given name, a middle name, or a surname. Notable people with the name include:

== Given name ==
- Hise Austin (1950–2019), American football cornerback

== Middle name ==
- Elijah Hise Norton (1821–1914), American congressman

== Surname ==
- Charles R. Van Hise (1857–1918), American geologist, university president, and progressive
- Elijah Hise (1802–1867), American diplomat and politician
- Henry Williams Hise (1920–2010), American brigadier general
- James Van Hise (born 1949), American popular culture historian
- Ralph Hise (born 1976), American state politician
