= Hise =

Hise, Van Hise, or HiSE can refer to:

- Hise (name)
- Hise Aircraft Corporation, company that created the Hise Model A
- Hise shrug, kind of shrugging exercise
- Odakyu 10000 series HiSE, Japanese train model
- Van Hise Elementary School, in Madison, Wisconsin, U.S.
- Van Hise Rock, rock near Rock Springs, Wisconsin, U.S.
- Van Hise Township, geographical township in Timiskaming District, Ontario, Canada

== See also ==
- Daniel Howell Hise House, historic house in Salem, Ohio, U.S.
- Highs (disambiguation)
