= North Carolina's 119th House district =

American legislative district

North Carolina's 119th State House of Representatives district
Representative
Anna Ferguson; R–Whittier
- Demographics: 79% White; 3% Black; 7% Hispanic; 1% Asian; 7% Native American; 3% Multiracial
- Population (2024): 91,475

North Carolina's 119th House district is one of 120 districts in the North Carolina House of Representatives. It has been represented by Republican Anna Ferguson since her appointment in 2026.

== Geography ==
Since 2023, the district has included all of Swain, Jackson, and Transylvania counties. The district overlaps with the 50th Senate district.

== District officeholders since 2003 ==
Representative	Party	Dates	Notes	Counties
District created January 1, 2003.
Phil Haire (Sylva)	Democratic	January 1, 2003 – January 1, 2013	Redistricted from the 52nd district Retired.	2003–2013; All of Swain and Jackson counties. Parts of Haywood and Macon counties.
Joe Sam Queen (Waynesville)	Democratic	January 1, 2013 – January 1, 2017	Lost re-election.	2013–2023; All of Swain and Jackson counties. Part of Haywood County.
Mike Clampitt (Bryson City)	Republican	January 1, 2017 – January 1, 2019	Lost re-election.	2013–2023; All of Swain and Jackson counties. Part of Haywood County.
Joe Sam Queen (Waynesville)	Democratic	January 1, 2019 – January 1, 2021	Lost re-election.	2013–2023; All of Swain and Jackson counties. Part of Haywood County.
Mike Clampitt (Bryson City)	Republican	January 1, 2021 – March 18, 2026	Died.	2013–2023; All of Swain and Jackson counties. Part of Haywood County.
Mike Clampitt (Bryson City)	Republican	January 1, 2021 – March 18, 2026	Died.	2023–Present; All of Swain, Jackson, and Transylvania counties.
Vacant		March 18, 2026 – April 16, 2026		2023–Present; All of Swain, Jackson, and Transylvania counties.
Anna Ferguson (Whittier)	Republican	April 16, 2026 – Present	Appointed to finish Clampitt's term.	2023–Present; All of Swain, Jackson, and Transylvania counties.

== Election results ==
=== 2026 ===
North Carolina House of Representatives 119th district Republican primary election, 2026
Party	Candidate	Votes	%
Republican	Mike Clampitt (incumbent)	4,508	56.72%
Republican	Anna Ferguson	2,988	37.59%
Republican	Mike Yow	452	5.69%
Total votes		7,948	100%

North Carolina House of Representatives 119th district general election, 2026
Party	Candidate	Votes	%
Republican	Anna Ferguson (incumbent)		
Democratic	Mark Burrows		
Total votes			100%

=== 2024 ===
North Carolina House of Representatives 119th district general election, 2024
Party	Candidate	Votes	%
Republican	Mike Clampitt (incumbent)	26,871	55.39%
Democratic	Mark Burrows	21,641	44.61%
Total votes		48,512	100%
Republican hold			

=== 2022 ===
North Carolina House of Representatives 119th district general election, 2022
Party	Candidate	Votes	%
Republican	Mike Clampitt (incumbent)	19,332	53.90%
Democratic	Al Platt	16,534	46.10%
Total votes		35,866	100%
Republican hold			

=== 2020 ===
North Carolina House of Representatives 119th district Republican primary election, 2020
Party	Candidate	Votes	%
Republican	Mike Clampitt	4,218	61.63%
Republican	Ron Mau	2,626	38.37%
Total votes		6,844	100%

North Carolina House of Representatives 119th district general election, 2020
Party	Candidate	Votes	%
Republican	Mike Clampitt	22,164	54.10%
Democratic	Joe Sam Queen (incumbent)	18,806	45.90%
Total votes		40,970	100%
Republican gain from Democratic			

=== 2018 ===
North Carolina House of Representatives 119th district general election, 2018
Party	Candidate	Votes	%
Democratic	Joe Sam Queen	15,662	52.33%
Republican	Mike Clampitt (incumbent)	14,270	47.67%
Total votes		29,932	100%
Democratic gain from Republican			

=== 2016 ===
North Carolina House of Representatives 119th district Republican primary election, 2016
Party	Candidate	Votes	%
Republican	Mike Clampitt	3,987	59.15%
Republican	Aaron Littlefield	2,754	40.85%
Total votes		6,741	100%

North Carolina House of Representatives 119th district general election, 2016
Party	Candidate	Votes	%
Republican	Mike Clampitt	17,757	50.39%
Democratic	Joe Sam Queen (incumbent)	17,480	49.61%
Total votes		35,237	100%
Republican gain from Democratic			

=== 2014 ===
North Carolina House of Representatives 119th district Republican primary election, 2014
Party	Candidate	Votes	%
Republican	Mike Clampitt	1,511	63.01%
Republican	Aaron Littlefield	455	18.97%
Republican	Dodie Allen	432	18.02%
Total votes		2,398	100%

North Carolina House of Representatives 119th district general election, 2014
Party	Candidate	Votes	%
Democratic	Joe Sam Queen (incumbent)	11,777	52.58%
Republican	Mike Clampitt	10,623	47.42%
Total votes		22,400	100%
Democratic hold			

=== 2012 ===
North Carolina House of Representatives 119th district Democratic primary election, 2012
Party	Candidate	Votes	%
Democratic	Joe Sam Queen	4,993	50.09%
Democratic	Danny E. Davis	4,975	49.91%
Total votes		9,968	100%

North Carolina House of Representatives 119th district general election, 2012
Party	Candidate	Votes	%
Democratic	Joe Sam Queen	16,679	51.73%
Republican	Mike Clampitt	15,562	48.27%
Total votes		32,241	100%
Democratic hold			

=== 2010 ===
North Carolina House of Representatives 119th district Democratic primary election, 2010
Party	Candidate	Votes	%
Democratic	Phil Haire (incumbent)	5,229	73.36%
Democratic	Bruce "Avram" Friedman	1,899	26.64%
Total votes		7,128	100%

North Carolina House of Representatives 119th district general election, 2010
Party	Candidate	Votes	%
Democratic	Phil Haire (incumbent)	12,637	55.95%
Republican	Dodie Allen	9,951	44.05%
Total votes		22,588	100%
Democratic hold			

=== 2008 ===
North Carolina House of Representatives 119th district Democratic primary election, 2008
Party	Candidate	Votes	%
Democratic	Phil Haire (incumbent)	8,614	72.35%
Democratic	Bruce "Avram" Friedman	3,292	27.65%
Total votes		11,906	100%

North Carolina House of Representatives 119th district general election, 2008
Party	Candidate	Votes	%
Democratic	Phil Haire (incumbent)	19,411	61.59%
Republican	Dodie Allen	12,104	38.41%
Total votes		31,515	100%
Democratic hold			

=== 2006 ===
North Carolina House of Representatives 119th district general election, 2006
Party	Candidate	Votes	%
Democratic	Phil Haire (incumbent)	13,158	58.61%
Republican	Margaret Carpenter	9,292	41.39%
Total votes		22,450	100%
Democratic hold			

=== 2004 ===
North Carolina House of Representatives 119th district general election, 2004
Party	Candidate	Votes	%
Democratic	Phil Haire (incumbent)	14,147	51.74%
Republican	Margaret Carpenter	13,195	48.26%
Total votes		27,342	100%
Democratic hold			

=== 2002 ===
North Carolina House of Representatives 119th district Democratic primary election, 2002
Party	Candidate	Votes	%
Democratic	Phil Haire (incumbent)	5,287	58.69%
Democratic	Troy Burns	3,721	41.31%
Total votes		9,008	100%

North Carolina House of Representatives 119th district general election, 2002
Party	Candidate	Votes	%
Democratic	Phil Haire (incumbent)	11,238	55.05%
Republican	Kaye Matthews	9,175	44.95%
Total votes		20,413	100%
Democratic hold			
