= Mike Clampitt =

American politician from North Carolina (1955–2026)

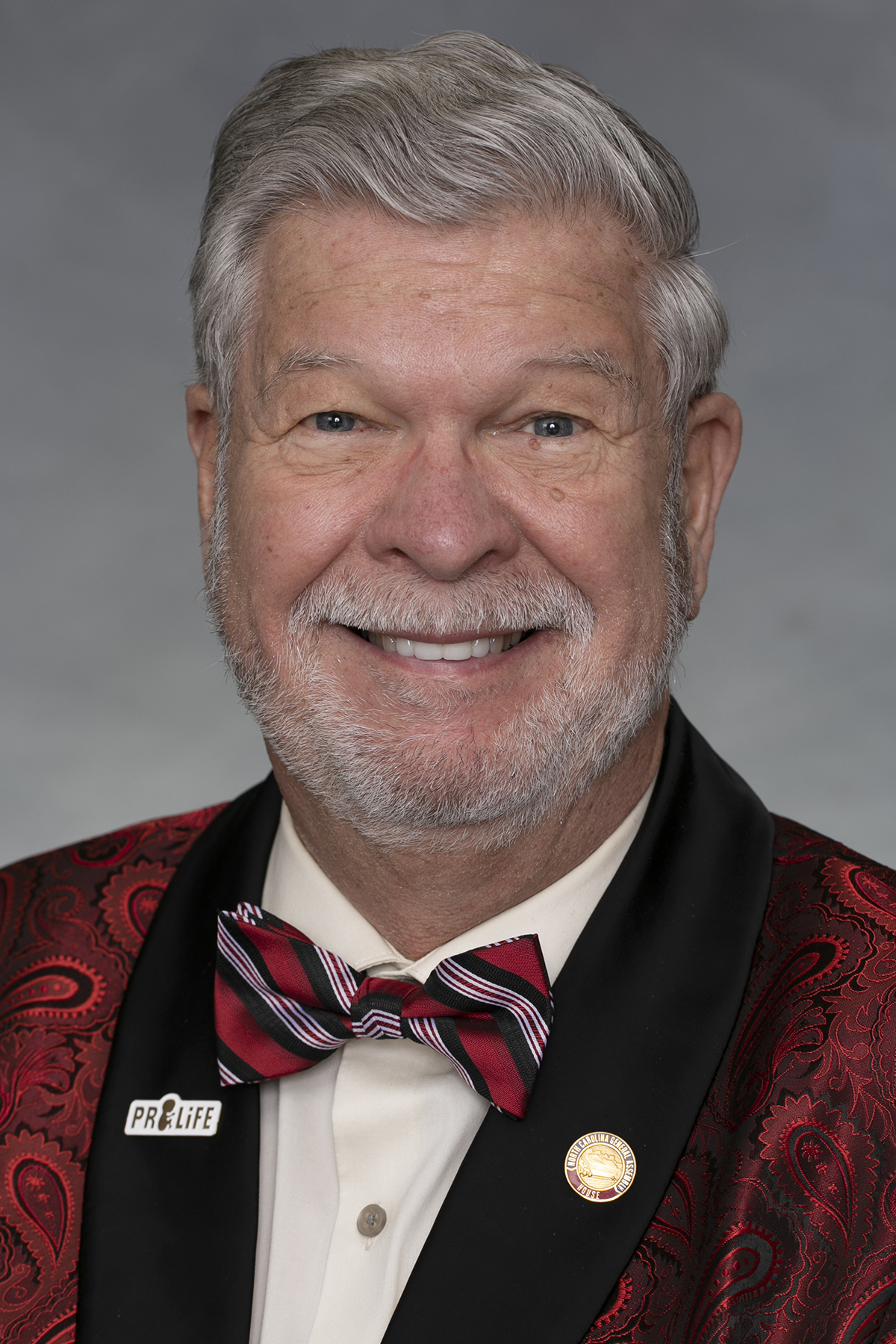
- Official portrait, 2023

Member of the North Carolina House of Representatives from the 119th district
- In office January 1, 2021 – March 18, 2026
- Preceded by: Joe Sam Queen
- Succeeded by: Anna Ferguson
- In office January 1, 2017 – January 1, 2019
- Preceded by: Joe Sam Queen
- Succeeded by: Joe Sam Queen

Personal details
- Born: James Michael Clampitt; February 17, 1955 Swain County, North Carolina, U.S.
- Died: March 18, 2026 (aged 71) Durham, North Carolina, U.S.
- Party: Republican
- Education: Rowan-Cabarrus Community College
- Occupation: Firefighter (retired)

James Michael Clampitt (February 17, 1955 – March 18, 2026) was an American politician. He was a member of the North Carolina House of Representatives from 2017 to 2019, and again from 2021 until his death in 2026. Before his election in 2016, he ran unsuccessfully for office for Swain County Board of Commissioners in both 2006 and 2010, and the North Carolina House of Representatives in 2012 and 2014. A Republican, he represented the 119th district, covering portions of Haywood, Jackson, and Swain counties. He previously served as a captain in the Charlotte Fire Department from 1977 to 2004.

== Involvement with the Oath Keepers ==
In late September 2021, it was revealed that Clampitt's name was among the some 38,000 people whose names appear on a membership roster of the Oath Keepers, a far-right anti-government militia, following a hack of the group's internal data. Records show that Clampitt had been on the Oath Keepers' roster since at least 2014. Clampitt was also a registered member of the Sons of Confederate Veterans.

== Personal life and death ==
Clampitt was a resident of Bryson City. He died from leukemia at Duke University Hospital on March 18, 2026, at the age of 71. His death was publicly announced by Destin Hall, the Speaker of the North Carolina House of Representatives. Governor Josh Stein paid tribute to Clampitt, saying that he was one of the first people he called about rebuilding the western part of the state after Hurricane Helene.

== Honors ==
In 2018, Clampitt received a 90% rating on the NC Values Coalition Legislative Scorecard.

During the 2018 general assembly session, Clampitt was one of the only Republican members of the House of Representatives to cosponsor Democratic Governor Roy Cooper's Budget.

North Carolina House of Representatives
Preceded by Joe Sam Queen	Member of the North Carolina House of Representatives from the 119th district 2017–2019	Succeeded by Joe Sam Queen
Preceded by Joe Sam Queen	Member of the North Carolina House of Representatives from the 119th district 2021–2026	Succeeded by Anna Ferguson
