= Anna Ferguson =

American politician

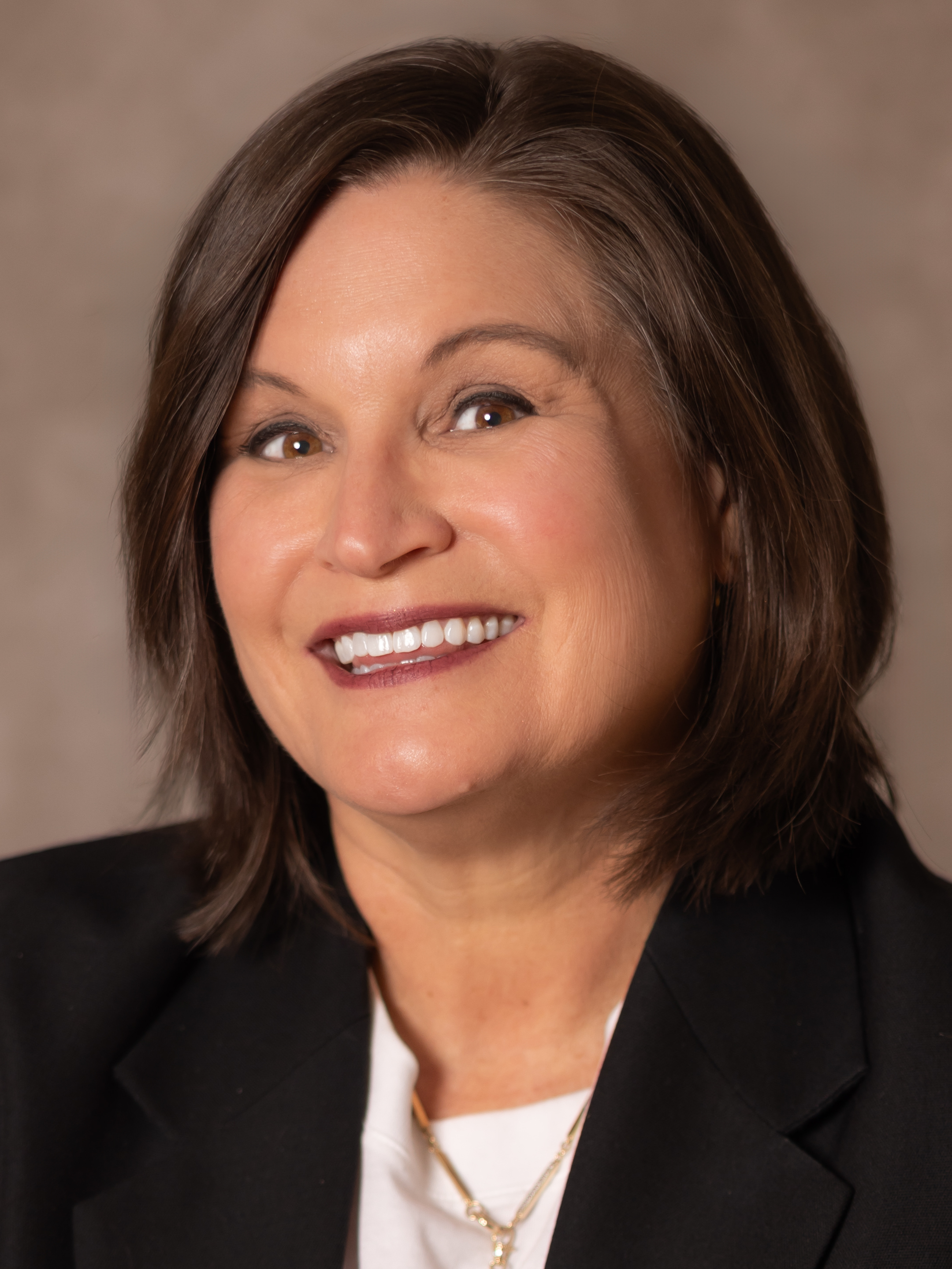

Member of the North Carolina House of Representatives from the 119th district
- Incumbent
- Assumed office April 16, 2026
- Preceded by: Mike Clampitt

Personal details
- Party: Republican
- Education: North Carolina State University

Anna Ferguson is an American politician who has served as a Republican member of the North Carolina House of Representatives from the 119th district since April 2026. She was selected to fill the seat following the death of incumbent Mike Clampitt in March 2026.

Ferguson is the first member of the Eastern Band of Cherokee Indians to serve in the North Carolina House of Representatives.
