= Highs =

Highs may refer to:

- HiGHS optimization solver, an open source library for solving constrained optimization problems
- High-pitched screamed vocals as used in some extreme music genres, by contrast with low-pitched growled vocals ("lows")
- Thomas Highs (1718–1803), British textile engineer

== See also ==
- High (disambiguation)
- Hise (disambiguation)
