= North Carolina's 47th Senate district =

American legislative district

North Carolina's 47th State Senate district
Senator
Ralph Hise; R–Spruce Pine
- Demographics: 89% White; 2% Black; 6% Hispanic; 1% Asian; 2% Multiracial
- Population (2023): 212,555

North Carolina's 47th Senate district is one of 50 districts in the North Carolina Senate. It has been represented by Republican Ralph Hise since 2011.

== Geography ==
Since 2023, the district has included all of Madison, Yancey, Mitchell, Avery, Watauga, Ashe, and Alleghany counties, as well as parts of Haywood and Caldwell counties. The district overlaps with the 85th, 87th, 93rd, and 118th state house districts.

== District officeholders since 2003 ==
Senator	Party	Dates	Notes	Counties
District created January 1, 2003.				2003–2013; All of Madison, Yancey, Mitchell, Avery, and McDowell counties. Part of Haywood County.
Joe Sam Queen (Waynesville)	Democratic	January 1, 2003 – January 1, 2005	Lost re-election.	2003–2013; All of Madison, Yancey, Mitchell, Avery, and McDowell counties. Part of Haywood County.
Keith Presnell (Burnsville)	Republican	January 1, 2005 – January 1, 2007	Lost re-election.	2003–2013; All of Madison, Yancey, Mitchell, Avery, and McDowell counties. Part of Haywood County.
Joe Sam Queen (Waynesville)	Democratic	January 1, 2007 – January 1, 2011	Lost re-election.	2003–2013; All of Madison, Yancey, Mitchell, Avery, and McDowell counties. Part of Haywood County.
Ralph Hise (Spruce Pine)	Republican	January 1, 2011 – Present		2003–2013; All of Madison, Yancey, Mitchell, Avery, and McDowell counties. Part of Haywood County.
Ralph Hise (Spruce Pine)	Republican	January 1, 2011 – Present		2013–2023; All of Madison, Yancey, Mitchell, McDowell, Rutherford, and Polk counties.
Ralph Hise (Spruce Pine)	Republican	January 1, 2011 – Present		2023–Present; All of Madison, Yancey, Mitchell, Avery, Watauga, Ashe and Alleghany counties. Parts of Haywood and Caldwell counties.

== Election results ==
=== 2024 ===
North Carolina Senate 47th district general election, 2024
Party	Candidate	Votes	%
Republican	Ralph Hise (incumbent)	75,607	64.15%
Democratic	Frank Patton Hughes III	42,247	35.85%
Total votes		117,854	100%
Republican hold			

=== 2022 ===
North Carolina Senate 47th district Republican primary election, 2022
Party	Candidate	Votes	%
Republican	Ralph Hise (incumbent)	13,163	50.70%
Republican	Deanna Ballard (incumbent)	12,801	49.30%
Total votes		25,964	100%

North Carolina Senate 47th district general election, 2022
Party	Candidate	Votes	%
Republican	Ralph Hise (incumbent)	62,436	100%
Total votes		62,436	100%
Republican hold			

=== 2020 ===
North Carolina Senate 47th district general election, 2020
Party	Candidate	Votes	%
Republican	Ralph Hise (incumbent)	68,440	68.44%
Democratic	David Brian Wheeler	31,554	31.56%
Total votes		99,997	100%
Republican hold			

=== 2018 ===
North Carolina Senate 47th district Democratic primary election, 2018
Party	Candidate	Votes	%
Democratic	David Wheeler	4,272	54.17%
Democratic	Cheryl D. Swofford	2,473	31.36%
Democratic	Christopher H. Rumfelt	1,141	14.47%
Total votes		7,886	100%

North Carolina Senate 47th district general election, 2018
Party	Candidate	Votes	%
Republican	Ralph Hise (incumbent)	44,305	62.33%
Democratic	David Wheeler	26,777	37.67%
Total votes		71,082	100%
Republican hold			

=== 2016 ===
North Carolina Senate 47th district Democratic primary election, 2016
Party	Candidate	Votes	%
Democratic	Mary Jane Boyd	8,981	60.14%
Democratic	Tim Murphy	5,953	39.86%
Total votes		14,934	100%

North Carolina Senate 47th district general election, 2016
Party	Candidate	Votes	%
Republican	Ralph Hise (incumbent)	56,021	64.85%
Democratic	Mary Jane Boyd	30,364	35.15%
Total votes		86,385	100%
Republican hold			

=== 2014 ===
North Carolina Senate 47th district Republican primary election, 2014
Party	Candidate	Votes	%
Republican	Ralph Hise (incumbent)	8,378	62.04%
Republican	Michael Lavender	5,127	37.96%
Total votes		13,505	100%

North Carolina Senate 47th district general election, 2014
Party	Candidate	Votes	%
Republican	Ralph Hise (incumbent)	39,299	100%
Total votes		39,299	100%
Republican hold			

=== 2012 ===
North Carolina Senate 47th district general election, 2012
Party	Candidate	Votes	%
Republican	Ralph Hise (incumbent)	46,415	56.46%
Democratic	Phil Feagan	35,799	43.54%
Total votes		82,214	100%
Republican hold			

=== 2010 ===
North Carolina Senate 47th district Republican primary election, 2010
Party	Candidate	Votes	%
Republican	Ralph Hise	4,864	37.63%
Republican	Tamera Frank	4,156	32.15%
Republican	Andy Webb	3,906	30.22%
Total votes		12,926	100%

North Carolina Senate 47th district general election, 2010
Party	Candidate	Votes	%
Republican	Ralph Hise	31,846	55.82%
Democratic	Joe Sam Queen (incumbent)	25,209	44.18%
Total votes		57,055	100%
Republican gain from Democratic			

=== 2008 ===
North Carolina Senate 47th district general election, 2008
Party	Candidate	Votes	%
Democratic	Joe Sam Queen (incumbent)	41,736	53.59%
Republican	Keith Presnell	36,144	46.41%
Total votes		77,880	100%
Democratic hold			

=== 2006 ===
North Carolina Senate 47th district general election, 2006
Party	Candidate	Votes	%
Democratic	Joe Sam Queen	27,935	51.29%
Republican	Keith Presnell (incumbent)	26,530	48.71%
Total votes		54,465	100%
Democratic gain from Republican			

=== 2004 ===
North Carolina Senate 47th district general election, 2004
Party	Candidate	Votes	%
Republican	Keith Presnell	37,791	52.56%
Democratic	Joe Sam Queen (incumbent)	34,115	47.44%
Total votes		71,906	100%
Republican gain from Democratic			

=== 2002 ===
North Carolina Senate 47th district Republican primary election, 2002
Party	Candidate	Votes	%
Republican	Gregg Thompson	5,749	41.99%
Republican	Keith Presnell	4,307	31.46%
Republican	Judith C. Fraser	2,671	19.51%
Republican	Garry W. Aldridge	964	7.04%
Total votes		13,691	100%

2002 North Carolina Senate District 47th district general election, 2002
Party	Candidate	Votes	%
Democratic	Joe Sam Queen	25,022	49.05%
Republican	Gregg Thompson	24,375	47.78%
Libertarian	Sherry Hill	1,619	3.17%
Total votes		51,016	100%
Democratic win (new seat)			
