= Don Johnson (American football) =

American football player (1920–1965)

Profile
- Position: Center / Linebacker

Personal information
- Born: September 14, 1920; Chicago, Illinois, U.S.
- Died: September 3, 1965 (aged 44); Oak Park, Illinois, U.S.
- Listed height: 6 ft 2 in (1.88 m)
- Listed weight: 235 lb (107 kg)

Career information
- High school: Chicago (IL) Austin
- College: Northwestern

Career history
- Cleveland Rams (1942)
- Stats at Pro Football Reference

Donald Clifford Johnson (September 14, 1920 – September 3, 1965) was an American football center and linebacker who played one season with the Cleveland Rams.

Johnson was born in Chicago, Illinois on September 14, 1920, to John and Hanna Johnson. He played college football at the Northwestern University, having previously attended Austin Community Academy High School in Chicago. Johnson was married to Lois and had one son, Donald. He died in Oak Park, Illinois on September 3, 1965, at the age of 44.
