= Warren Plunkett =

American football player and judge (1920–2018)

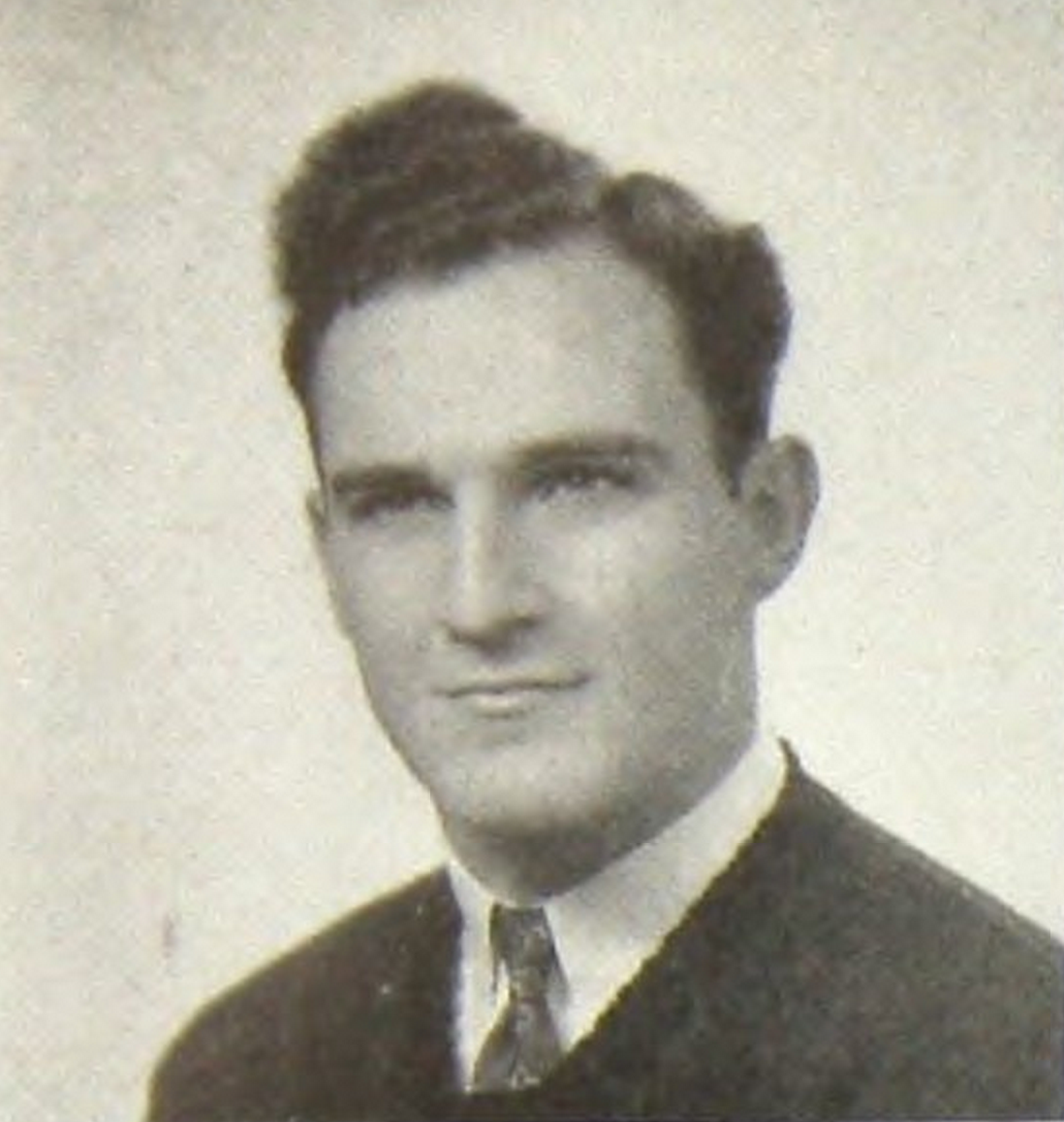
- Plunkett c. 1942 at the University of Minnesota

Profile
- Position: Blocking back

Personal information
- Born: August 4, 1920; Saint Paul, Minnesota, U.S.
- Died: December 30, 2018 (aged 98); Austin, Minnesota, U.S.
- Listed height: 6 ft 0 in (1.83 m)
- Listed weight: 200 lb (91 kg)

Career information
- High school: Austin (MN)
- College: Minnesota

Career history
- Cleveland Rams (1942)

Awards and highlights
- 2× National champion (1940, 1941)
- Stats at Pro Football Reference

Warren Francis Plunkett (August 4, 1920 – December 30, 2018) was an American football player and later a longtime judge.

Born in St Paul, his family moved to Austin, Minnesota when he was 7 years old. He attended Austin High School before going to the University of Minnesota. Playing as a blocking back for the Minnesota Golden Gophers football team, he was named an All-American while playing on two national championship squads; he later played one season with the Cleveland Rams of the National Football League (NFL).

After serving in World War 2, he attended the University of Minnesota Law School and returned to Austin to work at his family's law firm. In 1955 he was appointed to the 3rd Judicial District bench by Governor Orville Freeman, serving in that capacity until 1981, when he retired from the bench to reenter private practice. He kept his license to practice active until 2018.

In 1959 he purchased the S. P. Elam Residence, the second largest Usonian-style house designed by Frank Lloyd Wright, and lived there for 59 years until his death.
