= J. Paul Taylor (politician) =

American politician (1920–2023)

Member of the New Mexico House of Representatives from the 33rd district
- In office 1987–2005
- Succeeded by: Joni Gutierrez

Personal details
- Born: John Paul Taylor; August 24, 1920 Chamberino, New Mexico, U.S.
- Died: February 12, 2023 (aged 102) Mesilla, New Mexico, U.S.
- Party: Democratic
- Spouse: Mary Helen Daniels (m. 1945; died 2007)
- Profession: Teacher, rancher

John Paul Taylor (August 24, 1920 – February 12, 2023) was an American politician who was a Democratic member of the New Mexico House of Representatives from 1987 to 2005. Taylor attended New Mexico State University and was a teacher and academic administrator in Las Cruces, New Mexico. During his time in the House, he was known as "the conscience of the legislature" and chaired the House Health and Human Services Committee. He turned 100 in August 2020, and died from a heart attack at his home in Mesilla, New Mexico, on February 12, 2023, at the age of 1002.
