= Bernice Falk Haydu =

American aviator (1920–2021)

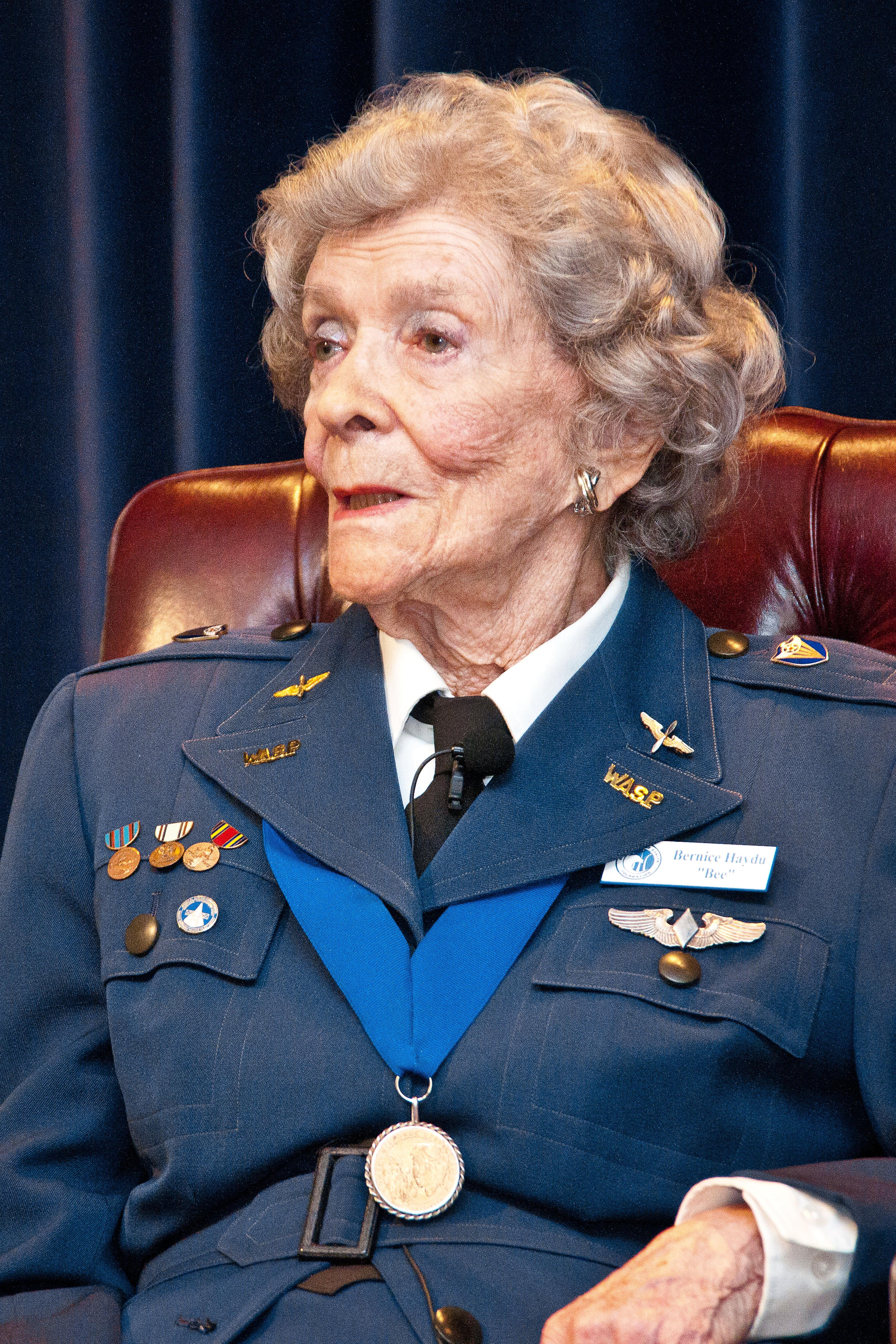
Bernice Haydu at Maxwell Air Force Base, June 5, 2014

Bernice "Bee" S. Falk Haydu (December 15, 1920 – January 30, 2021) was an American aviator and served as a Women Airforce Service Pilot (WASP) in World War II. Haydu remained active in aviation and remained an advocate for women pilots.

== Early life ==
Bernice Falk was born in December 1920 and raised in Montclair, New Jersey. She graduated from high school there in 1938. While working as a secretary, she enrolled in aviation classes on weekends, because her brother Lloyd was in the Army Air Force and she found that she also liked flying. In 1944 she attended WASP flight training in Sweetwater, Texas.

== Career ==
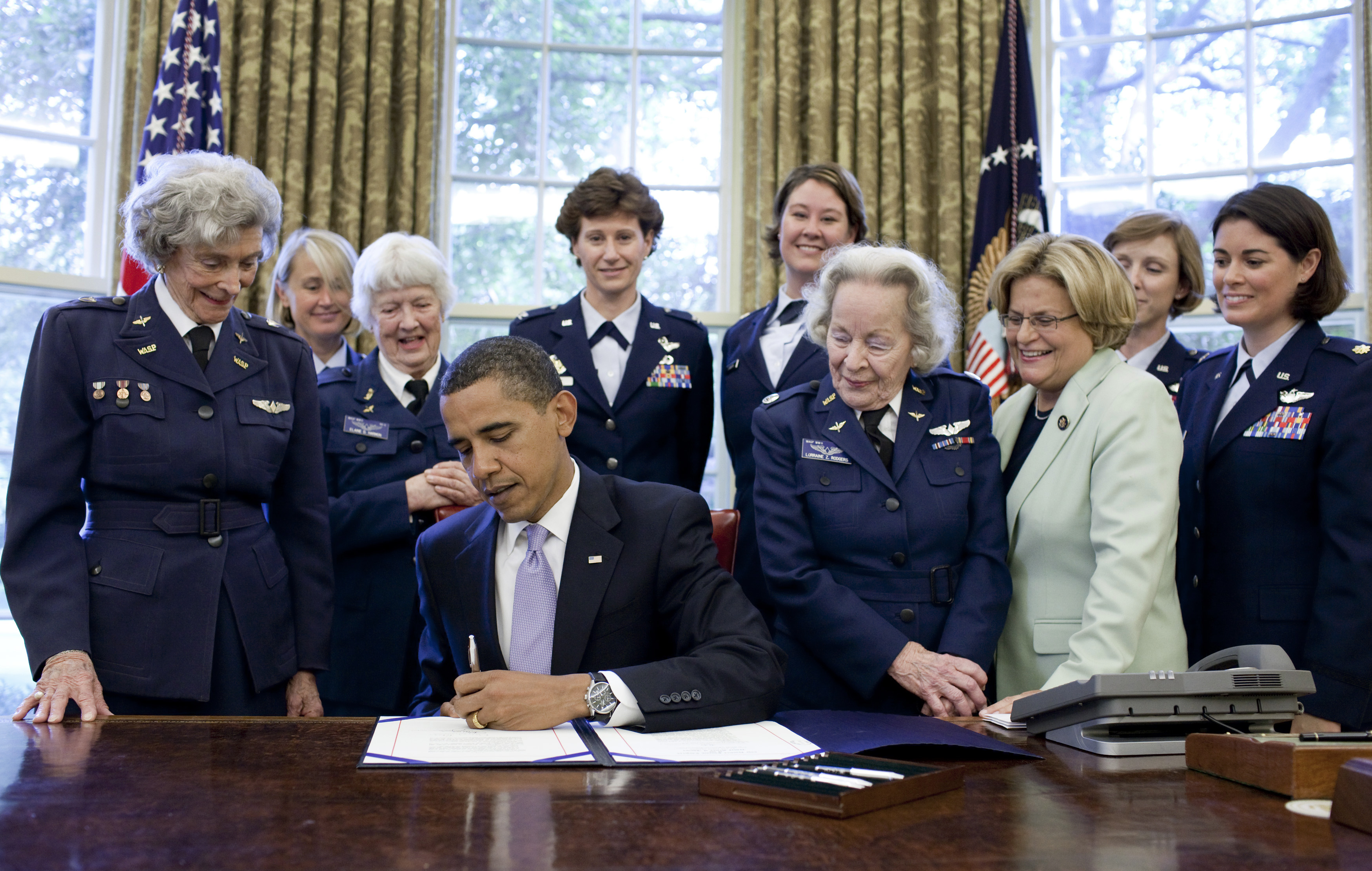
WASP Congressional Gold Medal signing ceremony, 2009; Haydu is standing in front at the left.

After completing training in March 1944, Bee Falk was assigned to Pecos Army Airfield as an engineering test pilot and a utility pilot for the remainder of the WASP program. After the war, Bee Haydu ferried aircraft and opened a Cessna dealership. She owned a flight school with several other veterans, and worked for Indamer, a New York company that sold aircraft parts to India. She also participated in airshows, and in two Powder Puff Derbies. In 1971, she was seriously injured as a passenger in an airshow flight in Ottawa.

She was president of the Order of Fifinella, an alumnae group for WASPs, from 1975 to 1978; during her tenure WASPs were officially recognized as veterans by Congress. From 1978 to 1980 she was president of Women Military Aviators. She was one of the three surviving WASPs present in the Oval Office in 2009, when Barack Obama awarded the Congressional Gold Medal to the WASPs for their service. Haydu received an honorary doctorate from Vaughn College of Aeronautics and Technology in 2015.

== Personal life and legacy ==
Bee Falk married fellow aviator Joe Haydu in 1951. They had three children together, Joseph, Steven, and Diana, born in 1952, 1953, and 1954, respectively. She was widowed in 2001, and spent her later life in Florida. Haydu published a memoir of World War II, Letters Home 1944-1945, in 2008. She gave memorabilia and an oral history interview to the Library of Congress and donated other materials to the Texas Women's University in Denton, Texas. There is a plaque commemorating the work of Bee Falk Haydu at the Aviation Hall of Fame and Museum of New Jersey at Teterboro Airport, and her WASP uniform is on display at the National Air and Space Museum. In her twilight years, Bee traveled with The Greatest Generations Foundation, a veterans organization that honors the legacies of the World War II generation through battlefield return programs.

She turned 100 on 15 December 2020, and died the following month on January 30, 2021.
