= Apolonia Muñoz Abarca =

Mexican-American health professional and activist

- Born: Apolonia Muñoz; September 5, 1920; Texas
- Died: 10 December 2009 (aged 89); Corpus Christi, Texas
- Burial place: Rose Hill Memorial Park, Corpus Christi
- Other name: Polly Abarca
- Education: Nursing school
- Occupations: Nurse, health care administrator
- Years active: 1944–1974
- Known for: Family planning and reproductive rights advocacy
- Notable work: First federal grant for birth control assistance
- Spouse: Antonio "Tony" Abarca

Apolonia "Polly" Muñoz Abarca (née Muñoz; September 5, 1920 – December 10, 2009) was a health professional and reproductive rights advocate in Corpus Christi, Texas.

== Early life ==
Apolonia “Polly” Muñoz Abarca was born as Apolonia Muñoz on September 5, 1920, in Texas. Her parents, Antonio and Apolonia (Villareal) Muñoz, raised their ten children in Mission, Texas. Polly volunteered to assist immigrants and disabled children as a teenager. She was a leader on her basketball and volleyball teams at the all-Hispanic Mission High School in a segregated education system, graduating in 1939. She started nursing school in Corpus Christi and in 1944, she became her classes' sole Hispanic graduate.

Polly began nursing school at the eve of the United States’ participation in World War II. She was already engaged to Antonio Abarca when he shipped out with the US Army, and her older brother, also named Antonio, served in Europe as a gunner.

== Career ==
Abarca first worked as a nurse at City-County Memorial Hospital in Corpus Christi. A year later, she was responsible for treating soldiers and prostitutes as director of the United States Health Service. In 1946, the same year that she married Tony Abarca, she accepted a position as director of outpatient services at Memorial Hospital. She founded a Corpus Christi cancer clinic, while volunteering to teach classes at a local settlement house.

In the 1960s, Abarca focused on family planning services, securing a $300,000 grant for Corpus Christi, the first grant of its kind in the United States. The next year, in 1965, she accepted the position of executive director for the South Texas Planned Parenthood Center. Her interests in birth control and family planning were aimed at women's health and preventing poverty. These family planning grants reduced “chronic, systemic poverty” thereby reducing the amount of spending on other social programs. After stepping away from the Planned Parenthood Center, she served persons with mental disabilities as nursing director at the Corpus Christi State School until her retirement in 1974.

== Death and legacy ==
Abarca died on December 10, 2009, in Corpus Christi and is interred at Rose Hill Memorial Park. Del Mar College created the Apolonia Abarca Nursing Scholarship Fund in her honor.
