= Ralph Hise =

American politician (born 1976)

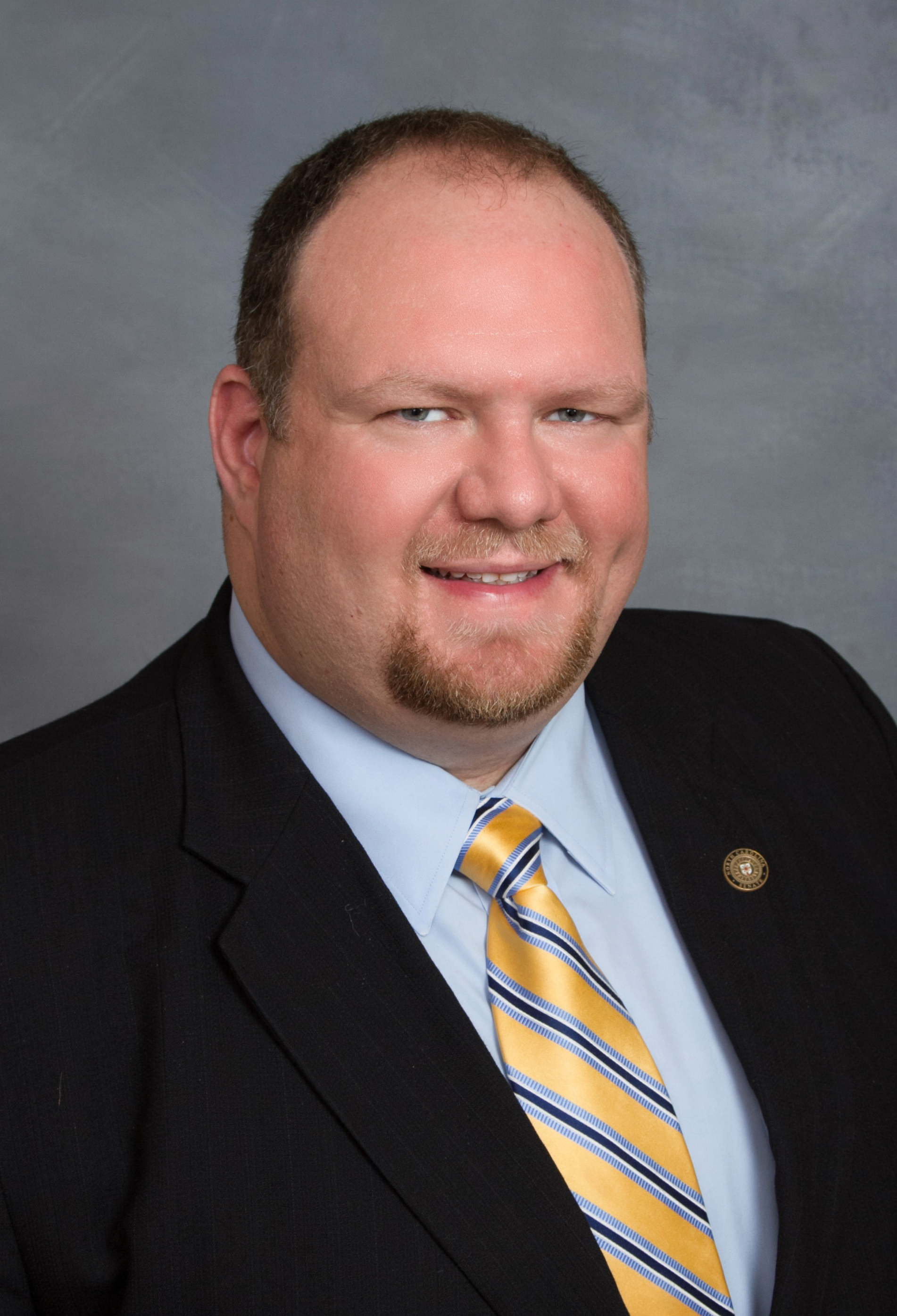
- Official portrait, 2013

Member of the North Carolina Senate from the 47th district
- Incumbent
- Assumed office January 1, 2011
- Preceded by: Joe Sam Queen

Personal details
- Born: August 15, 1976 (age 49) Mitchell County, North Carolina, U.S.
- Party: Republican
- Education: Appalachian State University (BS); North Carolina State University (MEd)

Ralph E. Hise Jr. (born August 15, 1976) is an American politician. A member of the Republican Party, he represents District 47 in the North Carolina Senate. Hise joined the Senate in 2011 after winning election on November 2, 2010. He is from Spruce Pine, North Carolina.

== Early life and career ==
Hise is a native of Mitchell County, North Carolina. He attended Mitchell High School, before graduating from the North Carolina School of Science and Mathematics. He received a B.S. in statistics from Appalachian State University before going on to complete a master's degree in higher education administration from North Carolina State University. He is a statistician by trade, and is currently serving as the Coordinator of Special Projects at Mayland Community College in Spruce Pine, North Carolina.

== Political career ==
At 35 years old in 2011, Hise was the youngest Republican member of the North Carolina Senate.

Hise used his position as chairman of a committee on Medicaid to convinced the Senate to reject the portion of House Bill 998, "a bill to study rural healthcare needs", which would have implemented a study to explore expanding Medicaid in North Carolina under the Affordable Care Act.

On January 9, 2019, he succeeded Senator Louis Pate as the Deputy President Pro Tempore of the North Carolina Senate.

In 2021, he proposed anti-transgender legislation which would prohibit medical professionals from performing gender confirmation surgery on those under the age of 21. The legislation would also mandate that state employees inform parents when their children display "gender nonconformity."

== Campaign finance investigation ==
In 2017, a North Carolina activist filed two complaints with the North Carolina Board of Elections. The complaints accused Hise of allegedly committing a variety of campaign finance violations, including "allegedly paying himself more than $10,000 from his campaign fund."

At the time he was also the chairman of the Senate Select Committee on Elections. After the State Board of Elections began investigating the accusations that Hise had broken campaign finance laws, Ralph Hise introduced Senate Bill 68, which altered the power and structure of the Board of Elections that was investigating him. The bill consolidated the State Board of Elections and State Board of Ethics into one entity called the State Board of Elections and Ethics Enforcement whose Chair switches between the two dominant parties every year such that the Chair is a Republican every even numbered year. The law also required county boards of elections to switch Chairs in the same manner. Ralph Hise refused to recuse himself from the consideration of the Bill when called on to do so due to the ongoing investigation. Senate Bill 68 was passed into law, but it was appealed before the Supreme Court of North Carolina, which ruled on January 26, 2018 that the appointment provisions violated the state Constitution.

In 2017, Hise "paid Parker Poe Adams and Bernstein law firm $7,700 in connection with a campaign finance audit by the state board of elections. Hise also paid his treasurer $9,000 for the audit."

As of 2018, the North Carolina Board of Elections and Ethics Enforcement had not commented on the matter.

Hise, along with State Representative Josh Dobson, was forced to forfeit money received from the Pfizer Inc. Political Action Committee, along with several other government officials in the largest campaign donation forfeitures in North Carolina history due to donations dated during the legislative session in 2017. Hise publicly stated afterwards, "I did not receive contributions during session. I was informed by the State Board of Elections, along with over 40 other legislators from both parties, that Pfizer cut the checks during a special session of the General Assembly. The date they were received by my campaign was a legal date. As requested, I returned the contributions to State Board of Elections."

== Personal life ==
Hise lives in Spruce Pine with his wife, Linn, and their twin sons. The family attends the church of the Ark of WNC.
