= Clifford E. Dorr =

American politician

Clifford E. Dorr (August 11, 1920 – June 1978) from Chippewa Falls, Wisconsin was a member of the Wisconsin State Assembly.

== Biography ==
Dorr was born in New Auburn, Wisconsin. He went on to serve in the United States Army during World War II. From 1955 to 1959, he was Sheriff of Chippewa County, Wisconsin.

== Political career ==
Dorr was elected to the Assembly in 1958. He was a Democrat.
