= Joe Sam Queen =

American politician from North Carolina (born 1950)

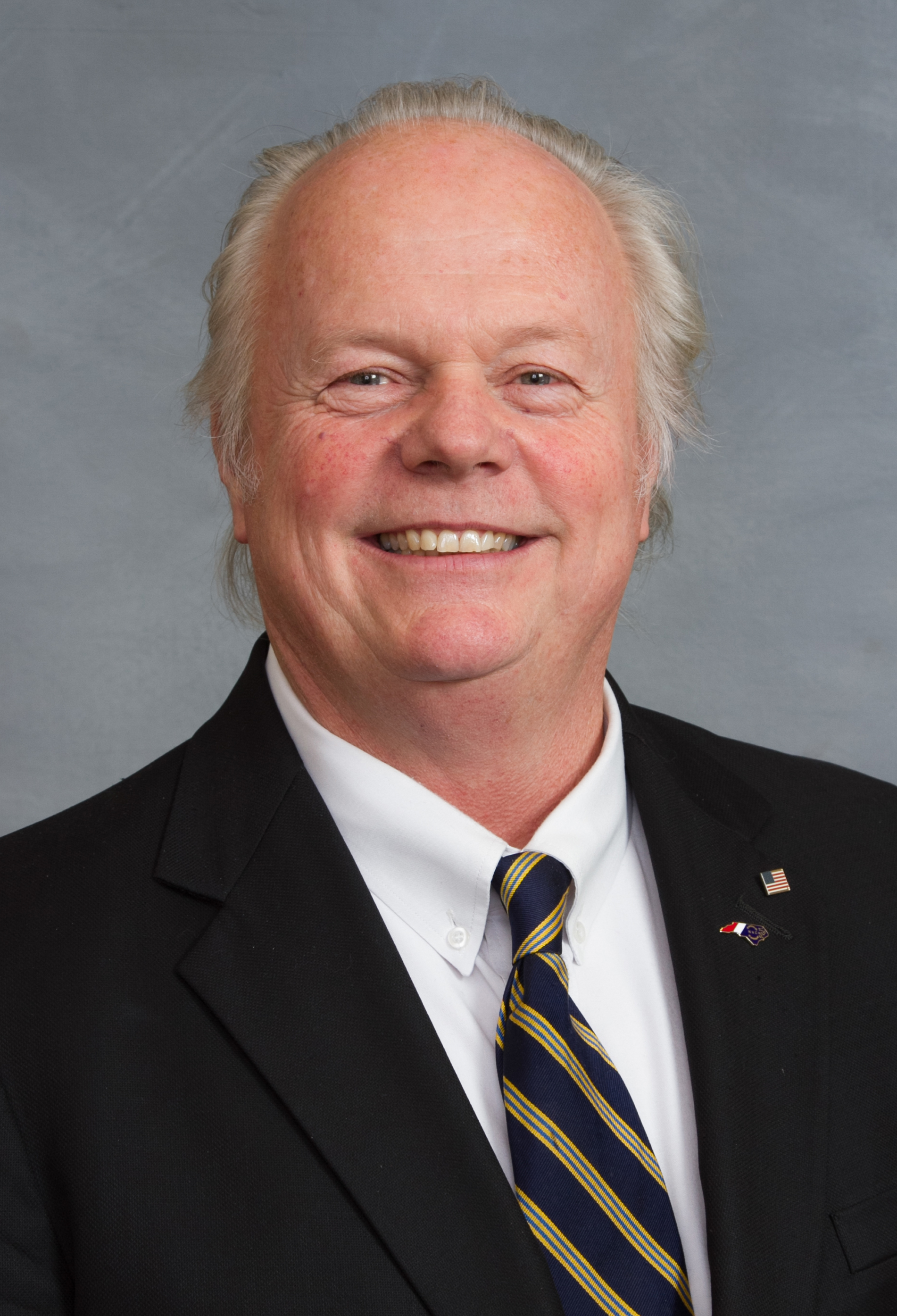
- Official portrait, 2013

Member of the North Carolina House of Representatives from the 119th district
- In office January 1, 2019 – January 1, 2021
- Preceded by: Mike Clampitt
- Succeeded by: Mike Clampitt
- In office January 1, 2013 – January 1, 2017
- Preceded by: Phil Haire
- Succeeded by: Mike Clampitt

Member of the North Carolina Senate from the 47th district
- In office January 1, 2007 – January 1, 2011
- Preceded by: Keith Presnell
- Succeeded by: Ralph Hise
- In office January 1, 2003 – January 1, 2005
- Preceded by: Constituency established
- Succeeded by: Keith Presnell

Personal details
- Born: June 18, 1950 (age 76) Waynesville, North Carolina, U.S.
- Party: Democratic
- Spouse: Kate Queen
- Children: 2
- Education: North Carolina State University (BS, MS)
- Profession: Architect

Joe Sam Queen (born June 18, 1950) is an American politician and architect. He has served in both the North Carolina Senate and the North Carolina House of Representatives. A Democrat, he has faced Republican Mike Clampitt in several elections, winning some and losing others.

== Political career ==
Queen represented the state's 47th Senate district, including constituents in Avery, Haywood, Madison, McDowell, Mitchell and Yancey counties. He was first elected in 2002, serving in the 2003-2004 session before being defeated in 2004 by former Yancey County commissioner Keith Presnell. Queen then defeated Presnell in 2006 and again in 2008. In 2010, he lost a bid for reelection to Ralph Hise.

He was elected to the North Carolina House in 2012, defeating Mike Clampitt, and defeated Clampitt again in 2014. He began his second term in the North Carolina House of Representatives (his 5th total term in the General Assembly) on January 14, 2015. He represented the 119th district, including constituents in Jackson, Swain and Haywood counties. He was defeated for reelection by Mike Clampitt in the 2016 general election. In the 2018 general election, Queen defeated Clampitt in a rematch to gain back his seat. In the 2020 general election, Queen lost to Clampitt.

Queen has served as the vice-chairman of the Aging Committee and was a voting member of committees on Agriculture, Transportation, Appropriations, Appropriations General Government, Judiciary II and Regulatory Reform. He was a vocal leader in the call to expand Medicaid in North Carolina and issues such as raising teacher pay. He is adamantly against fracking in North Carolina and has made strong public remarks against it.

== Personal life ==
An architect and a sixth generation resident of Haywood County, Queen is also heavily involved in other civic and cultural activities, including producing the summer street dances on Main Street in Waynesville and serving as director of the Smoky Mountain Folk Festival for more than 30 years. He has also served as a boy scout master, a Sunday school teacher, a youth soccer coach and on various boards and committees. He attends many arts and educational events in his district, including plays and concerts. He is married to Dr. Kate Queen and has two children, both of whom are graduates of North Carolina State University. He has an architectural practice in Waynesville.

== Electoral history ==
=== 2020 ===
North Carolina House of Representatives 119th district general election, 2020
Party	Candidate	Votes	%
Republican	Mike Clampitt	22,164	54.10%
Democratic	Joe Sam Queen (incumbent)	18,806	45.90%
Total votes		40,970	100%
Republican gain from Democratic			

=== 2018 ===
North Carolina House of Representatives 119th district general election, 2018
Party	Candidate	Votes	%
Democratic	Joe Sam Queen	15,662	52.33%
Republican	Mike Clampitt (incumbent)	14,270	47.67%
Total votes		29,932	100%
Democratic gain from Republican			

=== 2016 ===
North Carolina House of Representatives 119th district general election, 2016
Party	Candidate	Votes	%
Republican	Mike Clampitt	17,757	50.39%
Democratic	Joe Sam Queen (incumbent)	17,480	49.61%
Total votes		35,237	100%
Republican gain from Democratic			

=== 2014 ===
North Carolina House of Representatives 119th district general election, 2014
Party	Candidate	Votes	%
Democratic	Joe Sam Queen (incumbent)	11,777	52.58%
Republican	Mike Clampitt	10,623	47.42%
Total votes		22,400	100%
Democratic hold			

=== 2012 ===
North Carolina House of Representatives 119th district general election, 2012
Party	Candidate	Votes	%
Democratic	Joe Sam Queen	16,679	51.73%
Republican	Mike Clampitt	15,562	48.27%
Total votes		32,241	100%
Democratic hold			

=== 2010 ===
North Carolina Senate 47th district general election, 2010
Party	Candidate	Votes	%
Republican	Ralph Hise	31,846	55.82%
Democratic	Joe Sam Queen (incumbent)	25,209	44.18%
Total votes		57,055	100%
Republican gain from Democratic			

=== 2008 ===
North Carolina Senate 47th district general election, 2008
Party	Candidate	Votes	%
Democratic	Joe Sam Queen (incumbent)	41,736	53.59%
Republican	Keith Presnell	36,144	46.41%
Total votes		77,880	100%
Democratic hold			

=== 2006 ===
North Carolina Senate 47th district general election, 2006
Party	Candidate	Votes	%
Democratic	Joe Sam Queen	27,935	51.29%
Republican	Keith Presnell (incumbent)	26,530	48.71%
Total votes		54,465	100%
Democratic gain from Republican			

=== 2004 ===
North Carolina Senate 47th district general election, 2004
Party	Candidate	Votes	%
Republican	Keith Presnell	37,791	52.56%
Democratic	Joe Sam Queen (incumbent)	34,115	47.44%
Total votes		71,906	100%
Republican gain from Democratic			

=== 2002 ===
2002 North Carolina Senate District 47th district general election, 2002
Party	Candidate	Votes	%
Democratic	Joe Sam Queen	25,022	49.05%
Republican	Gregg Thompson	24,375	47.78%
Libertarian	Sherry Hill	1,619	3.17%
Total votes		51,016	100%
Democratic win (new seat)			

North Carolina Senate
Preceded by Constituency established	Member of the North Carolina Senate from the 47th district 2003–2005	Succeeded by Keith Presnell
Preceded by Keith Presnell	Member of the North Carolina Senate from the 47th district 2007–2011	Succeeded by Ralph Hise
North Carolina House of Representatives
Preceded by Phil Haire	Member of the North Carolina House of Representatives from the 119th district 2013–2017	Succeeded by Mike Clampitt
Preceded by Mike Clampitt	Member of the North Carolina House of Representatives from the 119th district 2019–2021	Succeeded by Mike Clampitt
