= William Moncrief =

American businessman (1920–2021)

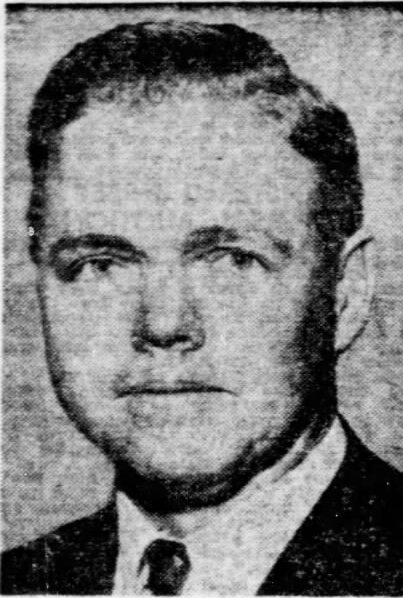
- Moncrief in 1948
- Born: March 27, 1920
- Died: December 29, 2021 (aged 101); Fort Worth, Texas, U.S.
- Education: The University of Texas at Austin (BS)
- Occupation: Businessman
- Known for: President of Moncrief Oil
- Children: 7
- Parent(s): Elizabeth Moncrief; William Alvin Moncrief

William Alvin Moncrief Jr. (March 27, 1920 – December 29, 2021), also known as Tex Moncrief, was an American businessman in the oil and gas sector, often described as a wildcatter. He served as president of Moncrief Oil, and was a billionaire member of the 2006 Forbes 400, with an estimated net worth of US$1 billion.

== Early years ==
William Alvin Moncrief Jr. was born on March 27, 1920. (Note: Sources differ on Moncrief's place of birth, citing either Fort Worth, Texas, Little Rock, Arkansas or Hot Springs, Arkansas.) He was the second child of William Alvin "Monty" Moncrief (1895–1986) and wife Elizabeth Bright, 1897–1992). In 1931, at the age of ten, Moncrief witnessed the opening of a gusher oil well at Gregg County, a joint venture between his father and John E. Farrell. He later described the experience:

It was just the greatest thing I ever saw. People were jumping around and hollering and hugging each other just like they'd won a football game. I decided on the spot that I wanted to become an oilman.

Moncrief graduated cum laude from Culver Military Academy in Culver, Indiana, in 1937, before continuing his education at The University of Texas at Austin, where he graduated with a degree in petroleum engineering in 1942. Moncrief worked for Consolidated Vultee, and then as an engineer for Stanolind Oil. When the United States entered World War II, Moncrief was commissioned in the United States Naval Reserve and served as a communication officer in the Pacific.

== Career ==
Moncrief returned from military service and joined Moncrief Oil, becoming a 50–50 partner with his father. Their father–son partnership was very successful, with Moncrief Oil discovering oil and gas in West Texas, Louisiana, Oklahoma and New Mexico. Their first major post-War success occurred in Scurry County, where the Moncriefs drilled 28 successful wells, which together produced more than 1.2 billion barrels of oil. In 1972, Moncrief acquired one-third of the natural gas field Madden Deep in Wyoming, which proved very profitable.

On September 1, 1994, the offices of Moncrief Oil were raided by the IRS, who seized more than one million documents. Moncrief was accused of owing the United States government between $100 million and $300 million. Following a two-year investigation, Moncrief pleaded "no contest" to one count of criminal tax fraud; this charge alleged that he had "improperly deducted" $900,000 in business expenses from his company Montex Drilling on his 1990 personal federal tax return. This agreement, although signed and sent to the United States Department of Justice, was never officially filed. On January 4, 1996, Moncrief and Montex settled with the IRS by agreeing to pay $23 million "for deficiencies in income, excise and gift taxes for taxable periods from Jan. 1, 1989, through Aug. 31, 1994." In 1998, Moncrief gave testimony before the Senate Finance Committee regarding the IRS raid on his offices:

In my imagination, federal raids were always confined to Mafia bosses and drug lords. If you had told me that 64 IRS agents would storm my office, with sidearms holstered and boot heels trampling my civil rights and my business reputation, I wouldn't have believed you.

In 1995, Forbes estimated Moncrief's personal wealth at US$500 million. In 2006, his wealth was estimated at US$1 billion. In January 2006, Moncrief sank his first wells in the Barnett Shale natural gas field. In September 2009, Moncrief bought a 10% stake in McMoRan Exploration Co.'s Davy Jones oil well off the Louisiana coast. Throughout his career, Moncrief strictly adhered to rules originally held by his father, to operate only through sole proprietorships and never go public.

== Philanthropy ==
The Moncrief family, based for decades in Fort Worth, were known locally for their "civic pride and charitable generosity." Moncrief himself had long been a philanthropic supporter of The University of Texas at Austin, where he graduated and later served on the Board of Regents. He donated more than $27 million to the university. In 1997, the W.A. "Tex" Moncrief Jr.-V.F. "Doc" Neuhaus Athletic Center was named in his honour. Moncrief was also noted for his patronage of Texas Christian University. He often supported conservative causes, and backed Ross Perot's 1992 Presidential bid.

== Personal life and death ==
In 1998, Moncrief had four surviving sons from two marriages: William, Richard, Charlie and Tom. By 2006, Moncrief was married for a third time with five surviving children. Two additional children died young: son John Herbert was killed in a motorcycle accident, and daughter Monty Francine died from leukemia at age seven or eight. By 2014, Moncrief was widowed.

In a 1998 article for FW Weekly, journalist P. A. Humphrey reported that family members, former employees and acquaintances had variously described Moncrief as "arrogant, controlling, opinionated, short-tempered, headstrong, [and] unyielding."

Moncrief was a founding member of the Shady Oaks Country Club in Fort Worth, Texas, and a close friend of professional golfer Ben Hogan. He was the uncle of Mike Moncrief, mayor of Fort Worth from 2003 to 2011.

In 1996, Moncrief accused Mary Ellen Lloyd, a former file clerk at Moncrief Oil, of embezzlement and testified against her in her criminal trial. In her defense, Lloyd stated that she had been Moncrief's mistress for sixteen years, beginning in 1979, which Moncrief denied under oath. On April 23, 1998, Lloyd was found not guilty of her embezzlement charges.

He turned 100 in March 2020, and died on December 29, 2021, at the age of 101.
