= Earl Killian =

American sports coach (1920–2022)

Biographical details
- Born: August 3, 1920
- Died: September 21, 2022 (aged 102)

Coaching career (HC unless noted)

Soccer
- 1951: Towson

Basketball
- 1958–1963: Towson

Baseball
- 1957–1973: Towson

Administrative career (AD unless noted)
- 1969: Towson

Head coaching record
- Overall: 5–4 (soccer); 9–76 (basketball); 97–92–2 (baseball)

Earl Willard Killian (August 3, 1920 – September 21, 2022) was an American college sports head coach and athletic director. He coached Towson University's men's soccer, men's basketball, and baseball teams. He was the first head coach of all three teams.

As of November 2016, Killian was living in Daytona Beach, Florida, and he turned 100 in August 2020. He died on September 21, 2022, at the age of 102.

== Head coaching record ==
=== Soccer ===
Record table
Season	Team	Overall	Conference	Standing	Postseason
Towson Tigers (Mason–Dixon Conference) (1951)
1951	Towson	5–4			
Towson:		5–4 (.556)			
Total:		5–4 (.556)			

=== Basketball ===
Record table
Season	Team	Overall	Conference	Standing	Postseason
Towson Tigers (Mason–Dixon Conference) (1958–1963)
1958–59	Towson	1–17			
1959–60	Towson	3–17			
1960–61	Towson	3–12			
1961–62	Towson	1–15			
1962–63	Towson	1–15			
Towson:		9–76 (.106)			
Total:		9–76 (.106)			

=== Baseball ===
Record table
Season	Team	Overall	Conference	Standing	Postseason
Towson Tigers (Mason–Dixon Conference) (1957–1973)
1957	Towson	3–11			
1958	Towson	5–8			
1959	Towson	7–7			
1960	Towson	6–7			
1961–1964	Towson	Results not available			
1965	Towson	8–4			
1966	Towson	9–5			
1967	Towson	9–5			
1968	Towson	11–3			
1969	Towson	9–4			
1970	Towson	12–7			
1971	Towson	9–9			
1972	Towson	4–12			
1973	Towson	5–10–2			
Towson:		97–92–2 (.513)			
Total:		97–92–2 (.513)			
