= Henry Williams Hise =

United States Marine Corps general

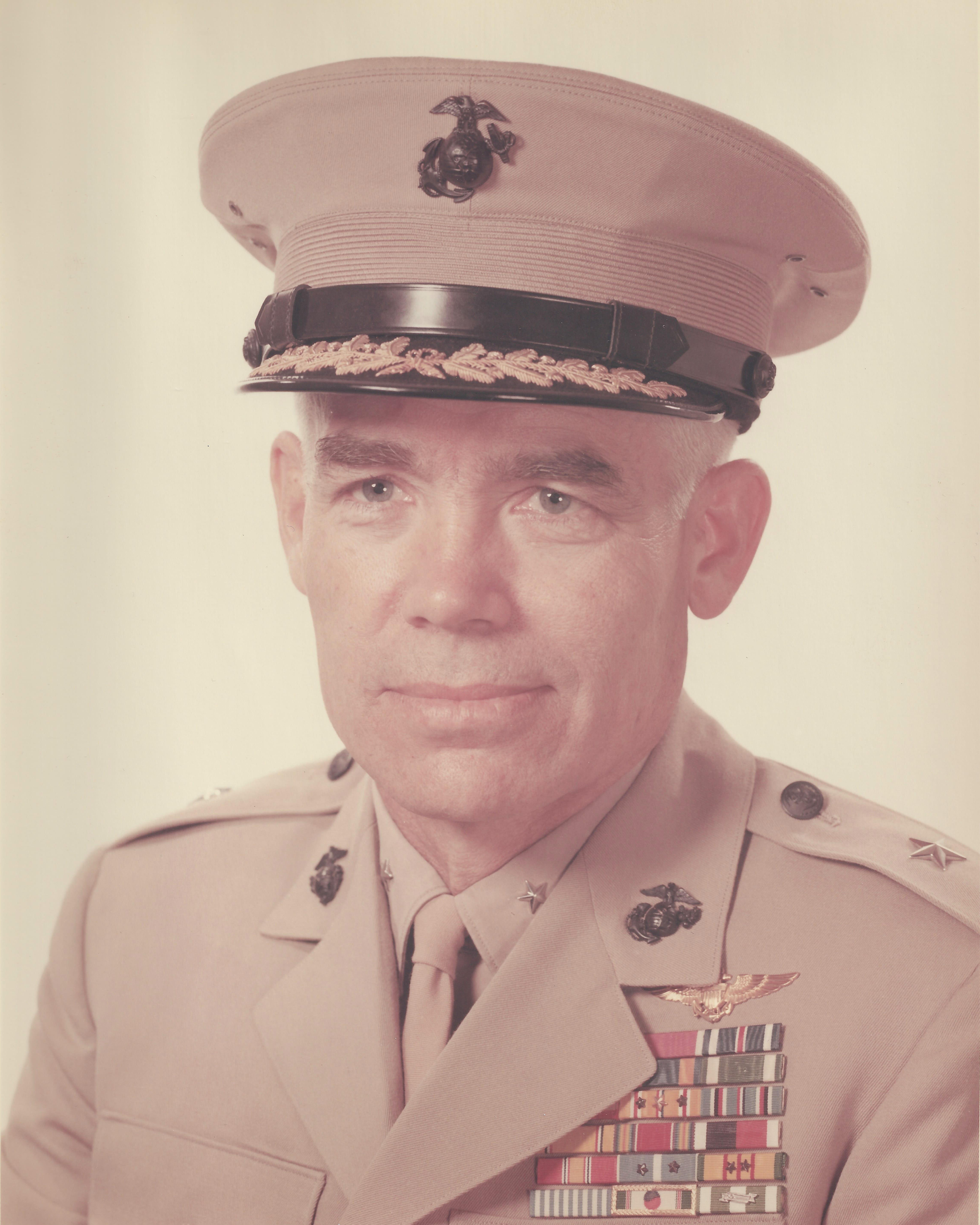
- Brigadier General H.W. Hise, USMC (1968–1971)
- Born: July 7, 1920; Shamrock, Texas
- Died: October 15, 2010 (aged 90); Lubbock, Texas
- Burial place: Arlington National Cemetery
- Military career
- Allegiance: United States of America
- Branch: United States Marine Corps
- Service years: 1941–1971
- Rank: Brigadier general
- Commands: VMSB-232; VMTB-143; VMSB-943; VMTB-132; VMF(N)-114; VMF-311; MGCIS-1(Air Control); VMF(AW)-531; MAG-13; 3rd MAW; 1st MAW; COMCABS (West)
- Conflicts: World War II Pacific Theater Korean War; Vietnam War
- Awards: Legion of Merit (2); Distinguished Flying Cross; Air Medal; Foxworth Commendation

Henry Williams Hise (July 7, 1920 – October 15, 2010) was a United States Marine Corps Brigadier General. Hise served in World War II, Korea and Vietnam as a Marine Corps aviator, completing five combat tours. He was awarded the Distinguished Flying Cross for his actions during the Guadalcanal Campaign in World War II.

== Biography ==
=== Early life ===
Henry W. Hise was born July 7, 1920, in Shamrock, Texas. He attended North Texas Agricultural College in Arlington, Texas. He then completed an additional year at the University of Texas at Austin before entering flight training in the summer of 1941 at Opa-Locka, Florida. After graduating from flight training, Hise was commissioned a second lieutenant in the Marine Corps Reserve on May 13, 1942.

=== World War II ===
Hise was assigned to Marine dive bomber squadron VMSB-232, commanded by Major Richard Mangrum. VMSB-232 and VMF-223 were deployed to Guadalcanal in August 1942. Launching from the USS Long Island aircraft carrier, the two squadrons were the first Marine aircraft to land on Henderson Field on August 20, 1942. The squadrons were met by General Alexander Vandegrift and the 1st Marine Division. On the morning of August 25, 1942, all able and available SBD dive bombers were launched from Henderson Field to attack the approaching Japanese task force commanded by Admiral Raizō Tanaka. The SBD dive bombers successfully attacked Tanaka's convoy, causing heavy damage to the cruiser, Jintsu, and rendering Tanaka unconscious. Lieutenant Hise was awarded the Distinguished Flying Cross for his actions during this engagement in the battle of the Eastern Solomon Islands. Hise was wounded the night of September 1, 1942, during a Japanese aerial bombardment; he was evacuated on September 3 to Espirito Santo on a B-17. Major Mangrum was the only pilot from VMSB-232 to walk away from Henderson Field. All others were killed, wounded or hospitalized.

Lieutenant Hise returned to the United States in October 1942. As the senior officer remaining in VMSB-232, he commanded the squadron until February 1943. Hise was promoted to captain in July 1943.

Captain Hise returned to the southwest Pacific in July 1943. He flew combat missions from Guadalcanal and Munda. He took command of VMTB-143 in December 1943, leading air attacks on Japanese forces and shipping in the New Ireland and New Britain areas, including the intensive aerial bombardment of Simpson Harbor, Rabaul, in January 1944.

Captain Hise returned to the United States in August 1944, serving first as commanding officer of VMSB-943 and then commander of VMTB-132, attached to the USS Cape Gloucester. The carrier sailed to the Western Pacific in April 1945 for combat operations around Okinawa and the South China Sea until the end of World War II. Captain Hise was promoted to major in July 1945.

=== Korean War ===
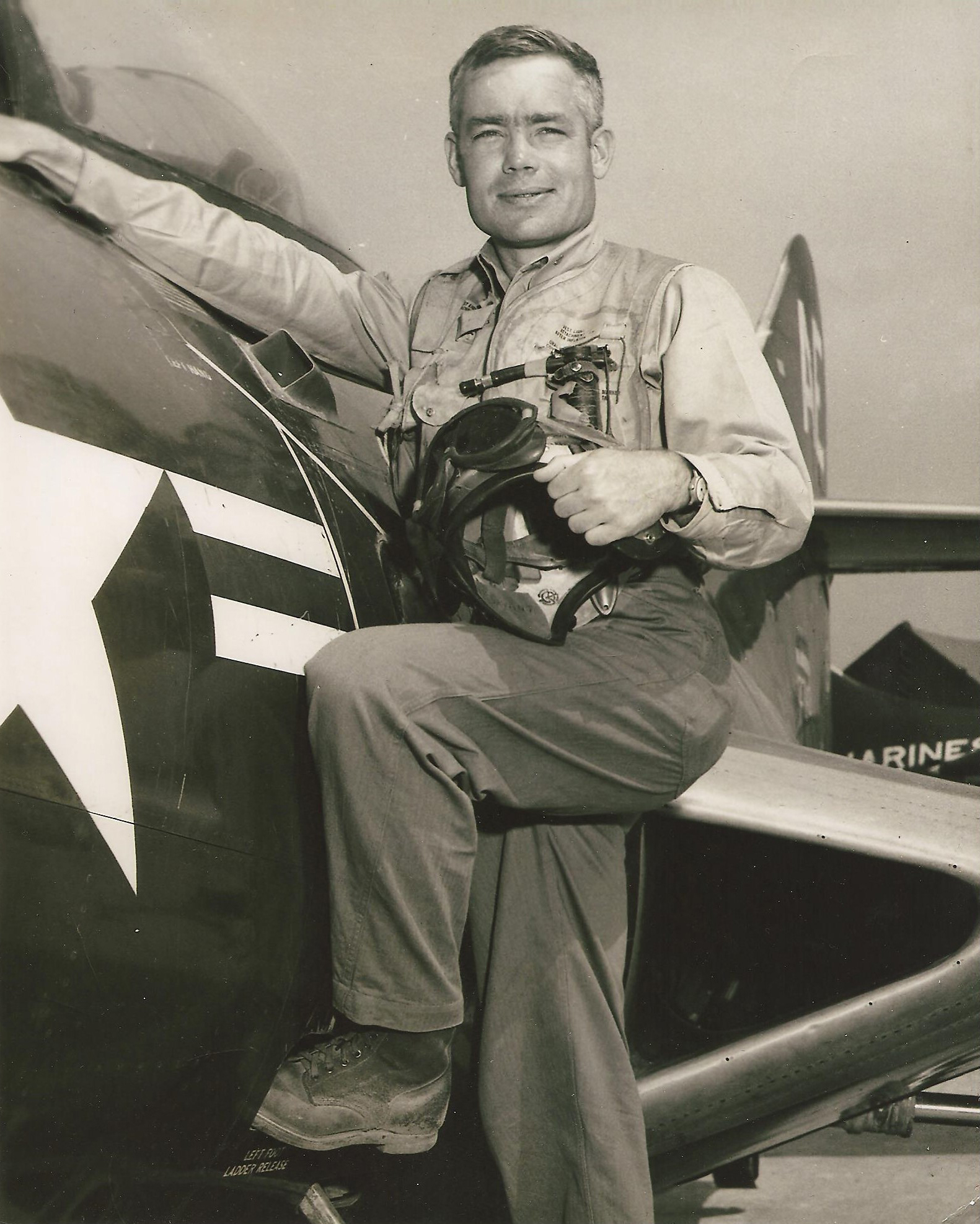
Hise pictured with a Grumman F9F Panther, Korea c. 1952

At the beginning of the Korean War, Major Hise returned to combat operations in March 1952 as a member of the VMF-311 flying F9F Panthers. He flew 66 airstrikes in the Korean campaign, including leading the successful destruction of the Chosin hydroelectric plant in June 1952, as part of the Sui-ho Dam Air Attacks. Major Hise received an unofficial United States Marine Corps Foxworth Commendation for his actions in the war.

=== Vietnam War ===
Major Hise was promoted to brigadier general in 1968. General Hise returned to combat operations for a fifth time as the Assistant Wing Commander of the First Marine Aircraft Wing, Da Nang Air Base. During this posting, General Hise directed close air support for Marine combat units in South Vietnam. General Hise's final posting was as commanding general of Marine Corps Air Station El Toro, near Irvine, California. As commanding general of MCAS, El Torro, General Hise designed and built a structure to hold a 17th-century Taoist Bell from Ho Chein, China. The ancient bell was brought in 1945 to the United States by the First Marine Air Wing; the bell and bell-house currently reside at the MCAS, Miramar. He retired from the USMC in 1971.

=== Military retirement ===
Returning to Texas, General Hise joined the faculty of the University of Texas of the Permian Basin in Odessa, TX, teaching international relations and foreign policy. During his tenure, General Hise testified before the Texas state legislature regarding misappropriation of funds at the University of Texas Permian Basin. His testimony ultimately led to the resignation of the university president, William Amstead. In November 1975, the Texas Monthly named Hise a hero for post-Watergate America.

Hise died on October 15, 2010, in Lubbock, Texas, and was buried in Arlington National Cemetery on December 1, 2010.

== Decorations and awards ==
Hise's awards include:

Naval Aviator Badge
Legion of Merit	Distinguished Flying Cross	Air Medal
Commendation Medal	Presidential Unit Citation	American Defense Service Medal
American Campaign Medal	Asiatic-Pacific Campaign Medal	World War II Victory Medal
Army of Occupation Medal	National Defense Service Medal	Korean Service Medal
Vietnam Service Medal	Vietnam Campaign Medal	United Nations Korea Medal
