= June 1920 =

Month in 1920

<<	June 1920					>>
Su	Mo	Tu	We	Th	Fr	Sa
		1	2	3	4	5
6	7	8	9	10	11	12
13	14	15	16	17	18	19
20	21	22	23	24	25	26
27	28	29	30

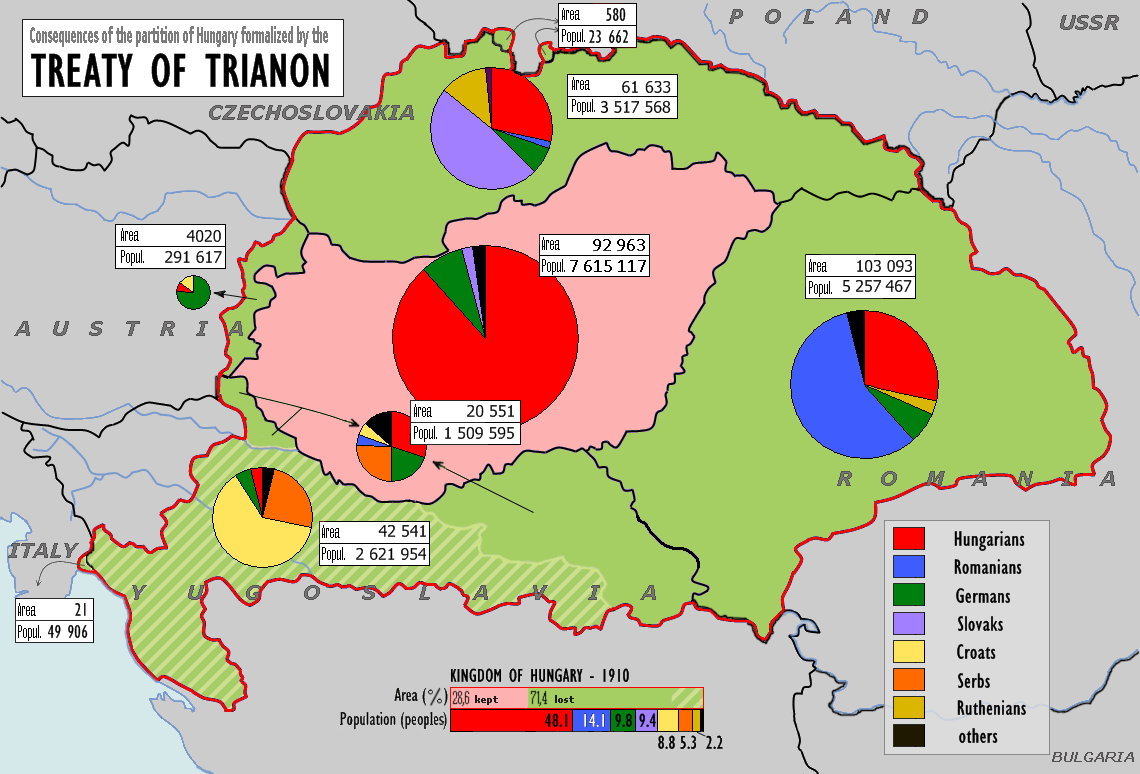
June 4, 1920: Hungary signs treaty at Trianon, loses 2/3rds of its territory (in green) to four nations

June 22, 1920: The pop-up toaster is invented

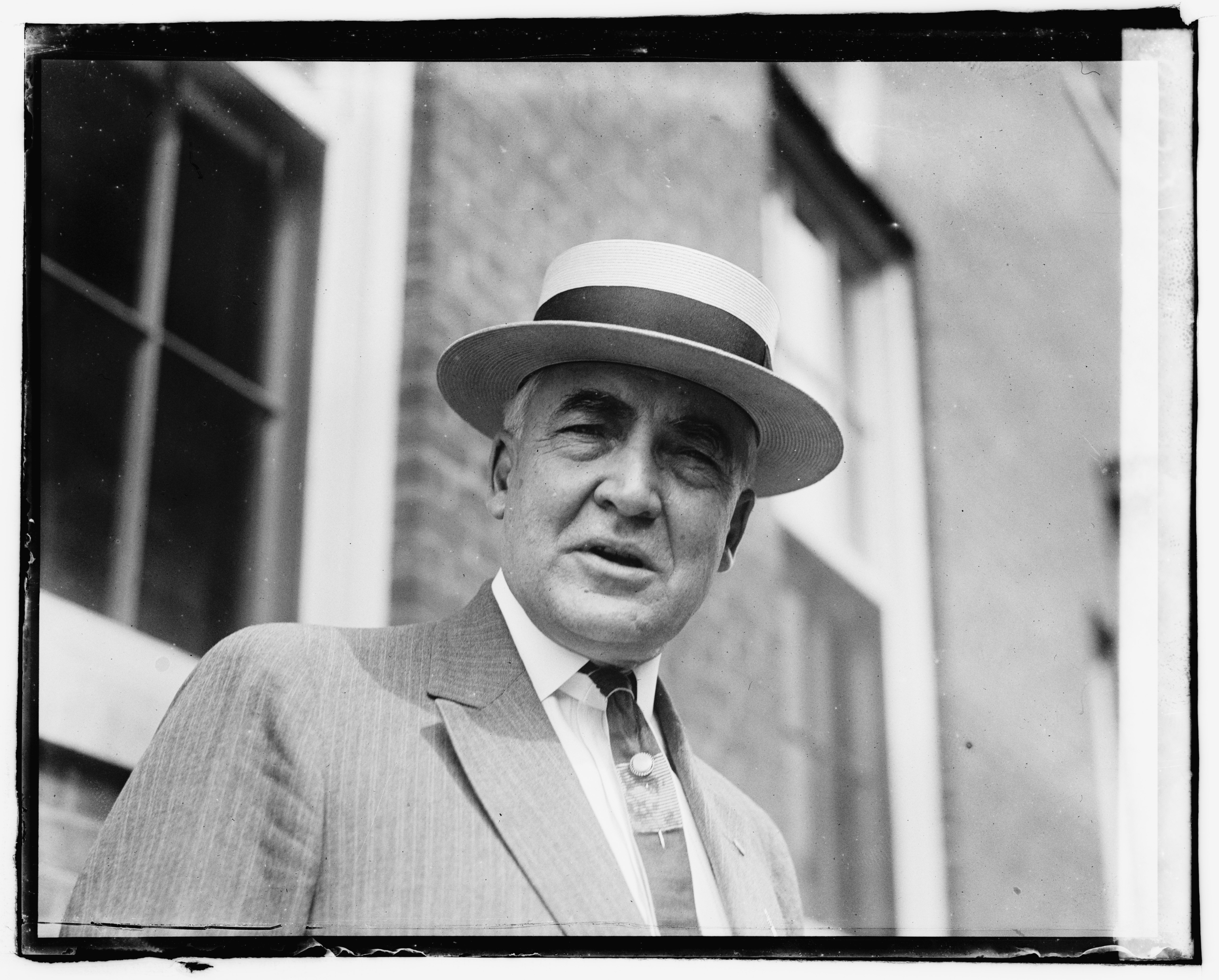
June 12, 1920: "Dark horse" Warren G. Harding nominated for U.S. president after Republican Party deadlock

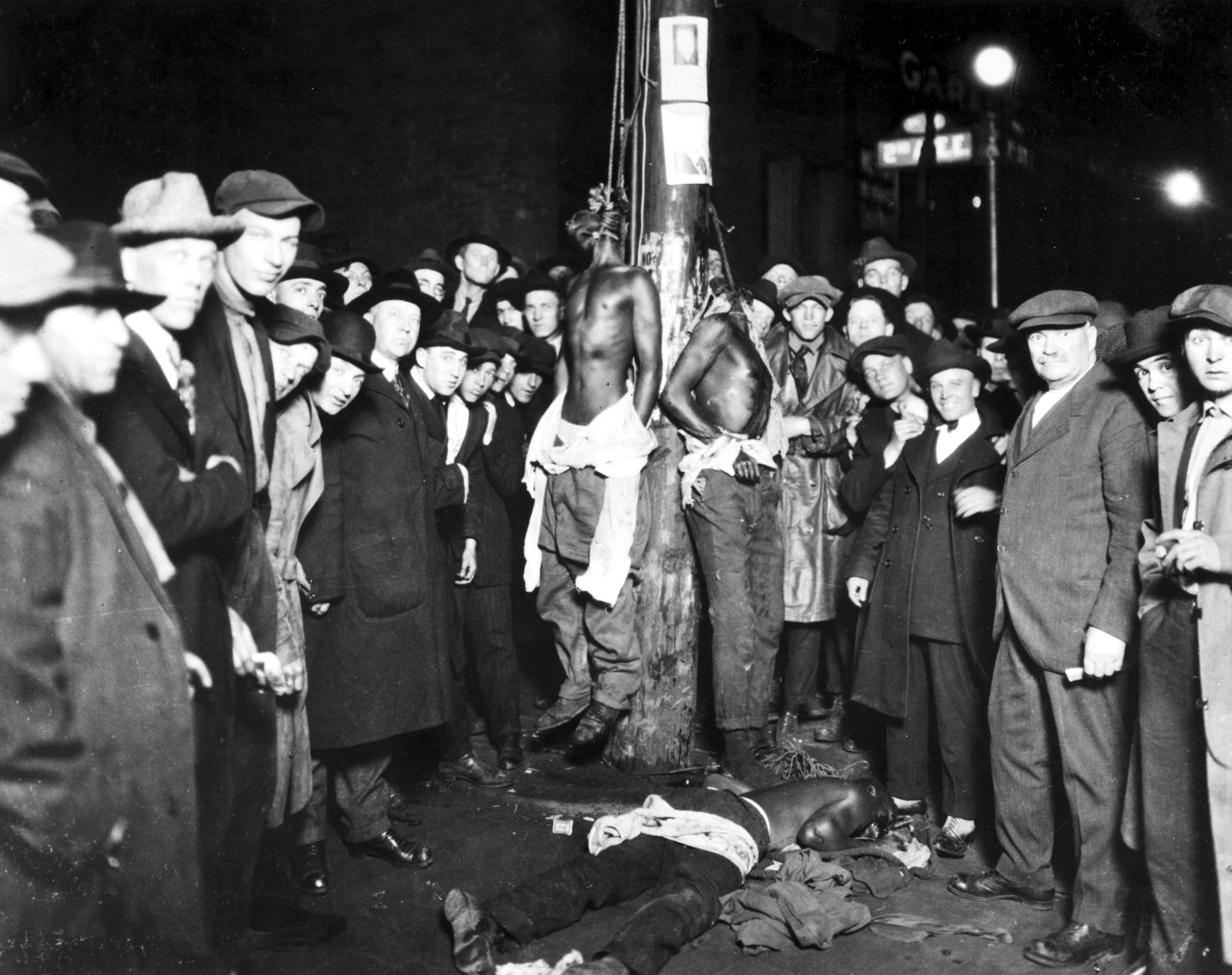
June 15, 1920: White mob storms police station in Duluth, Minnesota, lynches three black inmates

== June 1, 1920 (Tuesday) ==
- Adolfo de la Huerta was sworn into office as President of Mexico. The former Governor of Mexico's Sonora state had prompted the revolution that had toppled the government of President Carranza in May.
- U.S. President Woodrow Wilson's request to Congress to agree to a U.S. mandate over Armenia, similar to the British and French mandates over former Ottoman territories in the Middle East, was rejected by the U.S. Senate, 52 to 23.
- The U.S. Supreme Court ruled in Hawke v. Smith that Ohio could not hold a referendum to reverse its ratification of the Prohibition amendment (the 18th Amendment to the U.S. Constitution), holding that after the constitution is amended, the ratification cannot be taken back. Ohio, which had become the 36th and ratifying state in 1919, had authorized the holding of a public vote on the issue of retraction, but a restraining order had been issued by a lower court to prevent the printing of ballots. The ruling also meant that state legislatures couldn't take back ratifications of the 19th Amendment permitting women's suffrage.
- The Supreme Court ruled also that the salaries paid to the U.S. president and to federal judges were tax-exempt income.
- Born: Amos Yarkoni, Bedouin Arab Muslim, decorated officer within the Israel Defense Forces; as Abd el-Majid Hidr in Na'ura, Mandatory Palestine (d. 1991)

== June 2, 1920 (Wednesday) ==
- In the first known U.S. presidential veto of a bill because of bad grammar, President Wilson vetoed House Resolution 7629, an amendment to the federal penal code that added "licentious motion-picture films" to the list of items not permitted to be transported across state lines. Writing "I return herewith without my signature", Wilson noted that the phrase "subject to the jurisdiction thereof" was in the wrong place in a sentence and that "an obvious error has occurred" and that "I have had the change definitely indicated by appropriate pencil marks." Congressman Thomas L. Blanton of Texas urged a new resolution, saying "There is nothing improper in the President of the United States correcting the English of the House or Senate, is there?" and his colleague Joseph Walsh of Massachusetts replied (with bad grammar), "Not at all; not when their English is incorrect." House Resolution 14384 was hastily passed with the corrected version and signed by Wilson on the same day.
- Dr. Manuel Gondra was elected as the President of Paraguay by the national legislature. Gondra had previously served as acting president for seven weeks in 1911, and had later been the Paraguayan Ambassador to the United States.
- Delaware rejected the 19th Amendment to the U.S. Constitution, which was to provide women with the right to vote. The Delaware State Senate, on the final day of its annual session, voted 24 against and only 10 for the amendment. The state would finally ratify on March 6, 1923, more than two years after the amendment had become part of the constitution.
- Born:
  - Tex Schramm, American professional football executive, general manager of the Dallas Cowboys for the franchise's first 30 seasons, inducted in the Pro Football Hall of Fame; as Texas Earnest Schram Jr, in San Gabriel, California (d. 2003)
  - Johnny Speight, English television writer, known for BBC1's Till Death Us Do Part, the inspiration for the U.S. series All in the Family; in London, England (d. 1998)
  - Marcel Reich-Ranicki, Polish-born German literary critic; as Marceli Reich, in Włocławek, Poland (d. 2013)

== June 3, 1920 (Thursday) ==
- USS Tennessee, the first of the U.S. Navy's "Super-dreadnought battleships," was commissioned at the Brooklyn Navy Yard. Only one other Tennessee-class ship, USS California, was also being constructed.

== June 4, 1920 (Friday) ==
- The Treaty of Trianon was signed between the Allied Powers of World War I, and Hungary, which lost 72% of its territory within the former Austro-Hungarian Empire. The treaty was so unpopular that the Hungarian government had difficulty in finding anyone willing to sign the treaty, until Minister Plenipotentiary Alfred Detrashe Lazas and Minister of Labor Auguste Bernard agreed to do the task of agreeing to the breakup. A contributor to The Guardian called it "The most disastrous event in the long history of the ancient kingdom of Hungary was completed this afternoon in the long hall of the Grand Trianon at Versailles, when her two representatives put their signature at the foot of the treaty."
- U.S. President Woodrow Wilson vetoed the federal budget for the 1921 fiscal year, because it contained an amendment that interfered with his authority to remove executive branch appointees. The U.S. House of Representatives, holding a long session before adjournment for the summer, failed to override the veto in a vote taken after midnight.

== June 5, 1920 (Saturday) ==
- The Merchant Marine Act of 1920, one of several different U.S. laws referred to as "The Jones Act", was signed into law. The new law released U.S. government control (during peacetime) of American merchant ships to private companies and provided that "No merchandise shall be transported by water... on penalty of forfeiture thereof... between points in the United States... in any other vessel than a vessel built in and documented under the laws of the United States and owned by persons who are citizens of the United States." The law provides now that U.S. ships allowed to transport from one U.S. port to another must be owned by companies with at least 75% U.S. ownership, with a crew made up of at least 75% U.S. citizens, and must be built and registered in the U.S. Critics of the Jones Act have described it as "an archaic, burdensome law" whose result has been "to impose significant costs on the U.S. economy while providing few of the promised benefits."
- Julius Lörzing became the first botanist to find the rare carnivorous pitcher plant Nepenthes spectabilis, which grows only in the mountains on the island of Sumatra in Indonesia. Lörzing collected his specimen (Lörzing 7308) while climbing Mount Sibajak at an altitude of 1,800 metres (5,900 ft).
- The United States Women's Bureau, which celebrates its centennial in 2020, was created as a federal agency within the U.S. Department of Labor.
- Born: Marion Motley, American professional football running back, one of the first African American professional football players after World War II, inducted in the Pro Football Hall of Fame; in Leesburg, Georgia (d. 1999)
- Died:
  - Rhoda Broughton, 79, Welsh novelist and short story writer (b. 1840)
  - Julia A. Moore, 72, American poet, known for her famously bad poetry (b. 1847)

== June 6, 1920 (Sunday) ==
- In elections for the Reichstag in Germany, the Social Democratic Party (SPD) retained a plurality, but lost one-third of its 165 seats, while the Independent Social Democratic Party of Germany (USPD), made up of former leftist SPD members, gained 61 seats to more than triple its representation in the Reichstag. Herman Mueller, recently resigned German Chancellor, tried to forge a coalition government that would include his Social Democrats.

== June 7, 1920 (Monday) ==
- The Ku Klux Klan racist movement, the Knights of the Ku Klux Klan, began a public relations campaign to increase its membership nationwide. The Klan hired the Southern Publicity Association, founded in Atlanta by Bessie Tyler of the Daughters of America, and Edward Young Clarke, an Imperial Wizard of the Klan Wyn.
- The U.S. Supreme Court upheld seven separate cases challenging the ratification of the unpopular Eighteenth Amendment to the U.S. Constitution and the enforcement of its prohibition of the general sale of alcohol. The court also upheld a challenge to the Volstead Act's provision that limited the amount of alcoholic content in drink to no more than 0.5 percent or one proof.
- The Prime Minister of Portugal, António Maria Baptista, was conducting a meeting of his cabinet at Lisbon when he was "seized with an attack of congestion of the lungs" shortly after midnight. Baptista was rushed to a hospital and died six hours later. José Ramos Preto, the Minister of Justice, was temporarily appointed to the position of prime minister.
- President Huerta of Mexico announced that Congressional elections would be held on August 1, and a presidential election would take place on September 3.

== June 8, 1920 (Tuesday) ==
- The 1920 Republican National Convention opened at the Chicago Coliseum.
- By a vote of 22 to 19 in favor of postponing consideration of the 19th Amendment to the U.S. Constitution (granting women the right to vote nationwide), the Louisiana State Senate effectively rejected the measure. Only one state's ratification remained necessary for the amendment, permitting women the right to vote in all elections, to go into effect. The postponement was a surprise, in that a report the day before indicated that passage by Louisiana's senate was expected after the resolution had been passed to a third reading.

== June 9, 1920 (Wednesday) ==
- Leopold Skulski resigned as Prime Minister of Poland after six months, following the failure of Poland's effort to fight along with the Ukrainian Army against the Soviet Union.
- Italy's Prime Minister Francesco Nitti and his cabinet resigned.
- Fourteen passengers were killed when New York Central Railroad's Train Number 28 was struck from behind by another eastbound freight train near Schenectady, New York, after the NYCRR train stalled on the track because of a defective water pipe. The engineer for Train Number 34 of the Michigan Central Railroad, which had departed later on the eastbound track for the Buffalo to New York City route, reportedly drove through two warning signals and was the only casualty on his train. Two other people died from their injuries in the days after the accident.

== June 10, 1920 (Thursday) ==
- Less than a week after signing the Treaty of Trianon, Hungary's Prime Minister Sándor Simonyi-Semadam resigned along with his cabinet.
- U.S. President Wilson signed the Federal Water Power Act (now the Federal Power Act) into law, giving the federal government jurisdiction over utility providers whose businesses were part of interstate commerce. The signing was not announced until one week later. The act created the Federal Power Commission within the U.S. Department of Commerce and, "in order to prevent private firms from monopolizing power resources", gave the FPC "authority to determine who could build power plants."
- Germany announced that it had successfully reduced the size of its army to 200,000 troops, in compliance with the Treaty of Versailles.
- The British tugboat St. Boswells struck a sea mine while towing the former German cargo ship Santa Theresa, which had been transferred to British control, from South America to Germany. The St Boswells sank within two minutes after striking the mine in the North Sea, and 16 of its 22 crew went down with the ship, including its Captain, three officers, and eight maintenance crew.
- Born: Ruth Graham, Chinese-born American Christian author, wife of evangelist Billy Graham; as Ruth McCue Bell, Huai'an, Jiangsu province, Republic of China (d. 2007)

== June 11, 1920 (Friday) ==
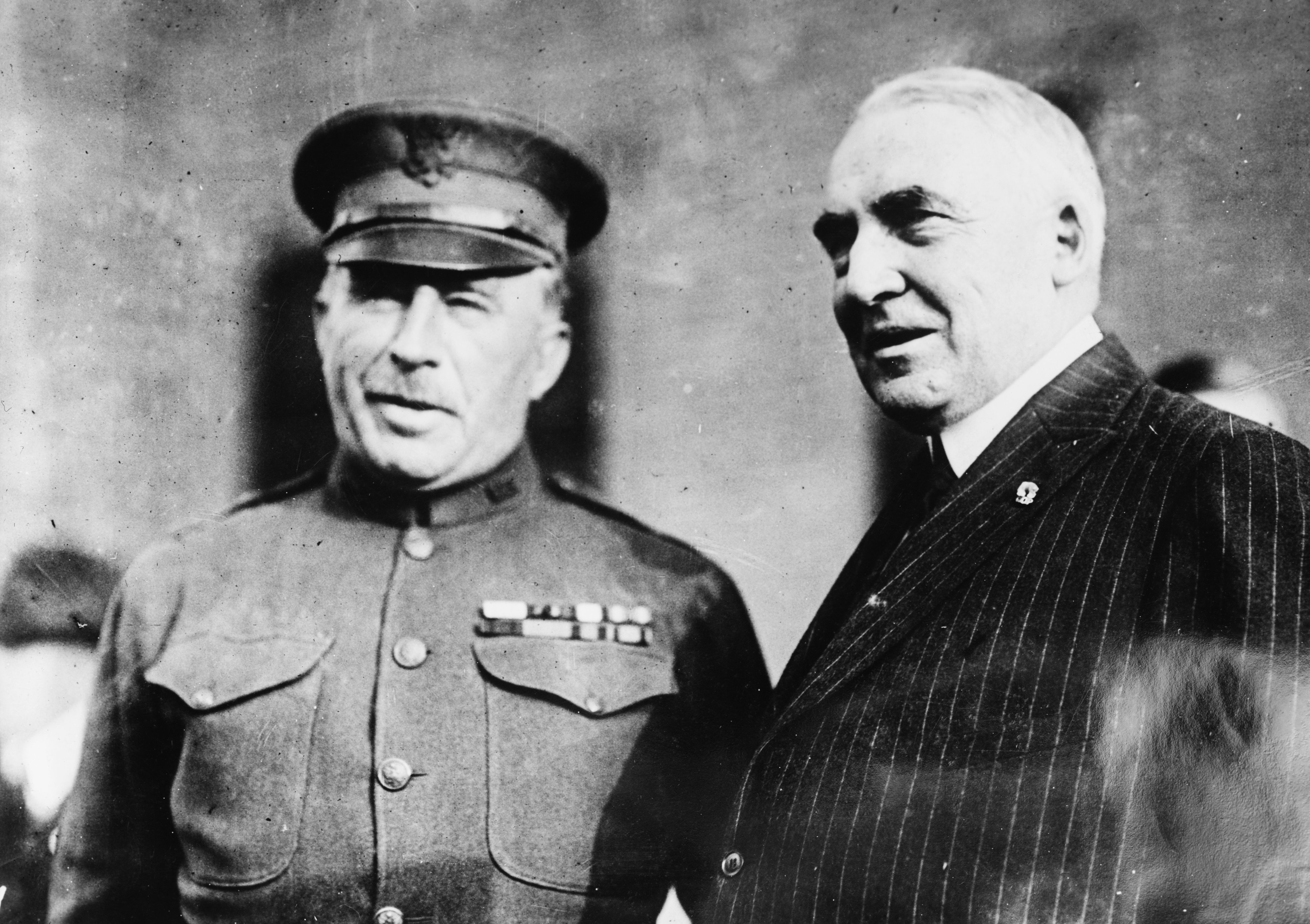
Front runner Wood and eventual nominee Harding

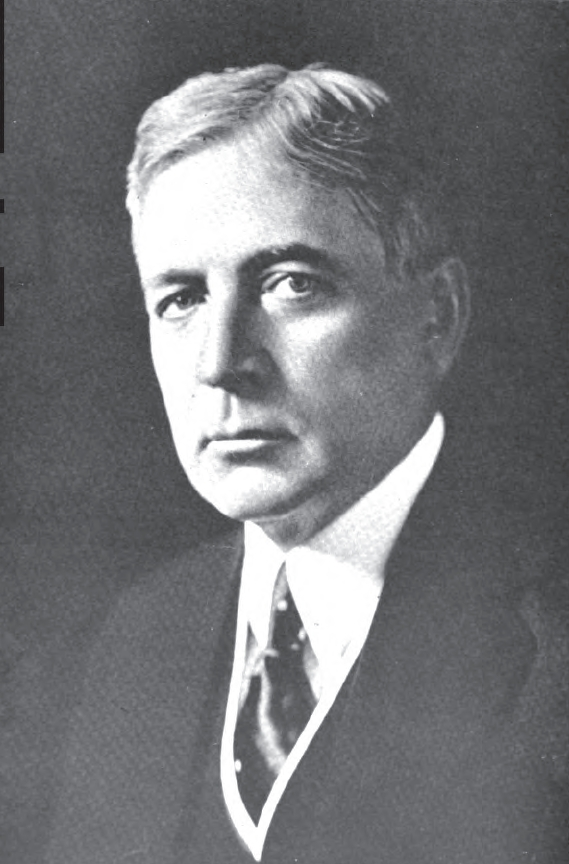
Governor Lowden

- The first four rounds of balloting taken for the presidential nomination were conducted at the 1920 Republican National Convention. As the session closed at 7:00 in the evening, no candidate had the required majority of the 940 delegates' votes. With 471 necessary to be nominated, Major General Leonard Wood was in first place at the end of the day, with 314½ votes and Illinois Governor Frank Lowden was second with 289. The next highest totals after four rounds were U.S. Senator Hiram Johnson of California (140½), Pennsylvania Governor William C. Sproul (79½) and U.S. Senator Warren G. Harding of Ohio (61½).
- Austria's Chancellor Karl Renner and his cabinet resigned
- Born: King Mahendra of Nepal, ruler of Nepal from 1955 to 1972; in Kathmandu (d. 1972)
- Died: Joseph B. Elwell, 47, American bridge player and writer, known for being an unsolved murder victim; murdered (b. 1873)

== June 12, 1920 (Saturday) ==
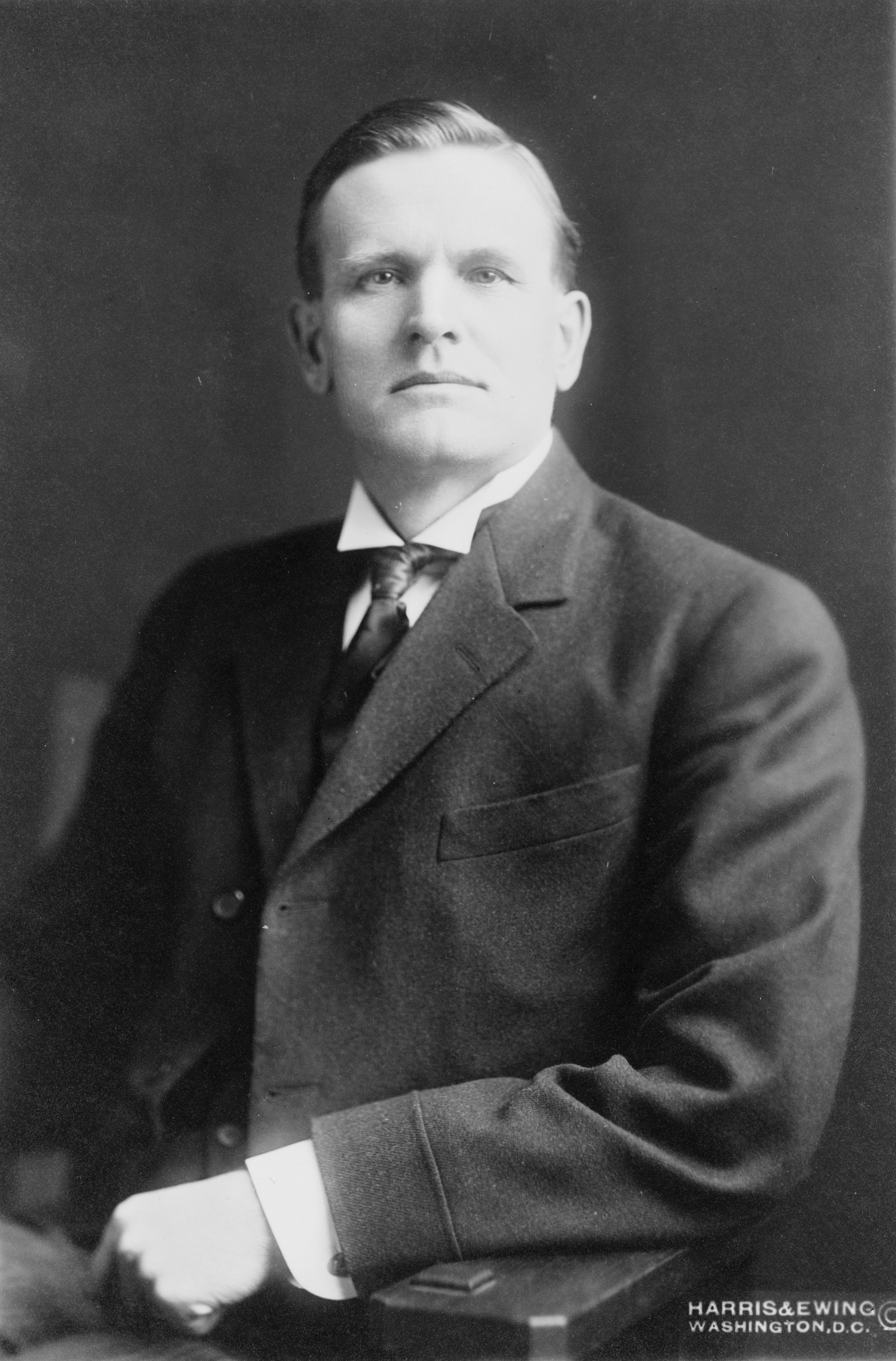
Senator Lenroot

- On the tenth round of balloting at the Republican National Convention, U.S. Senator Warren G. Harding of Ohio was approved as the party's nominee for president. The day opened with the fifth round of voting, and Harding was in sixth place (behind General Wood, Governor Lowden, Senator Johnson, Governor Sproul and Columbia University President Nicholas Murray Butler) with 65½ votes. On the next round, Harding moved into third place with 89 votes, while Wood and Lowden were tied for first with 311½ each. Harding steadily gained and, in the ninth round, gained 270 delegates that had shifted from Sproul and Lowden. Making a reference to the game of poker, Harding told reporters, "Well, you know how a fellow feels that holds a pair of eights and has to stay in and draws full."
- U.S. Senator Irvine Lenroot of Wisconsin, who had agreed to serve as Harding's running mate, was rejected on the first round of balloting for the U.S. nominee Vice President, with Massachusetts Governor Calvin Coolidge getting 674½ votes and Lenroot getting 146½. Although a popular myth is that Lenroot turned down the chance to be Vice President (and with it, the presidency of the United States upon Harding's death in 1923), what actually happened was that the convention delegates went against the GOP leadership's recommendation. When U.S. Senator Medill McCormick began his nominating speech for Lenroot, a delegate from Oregon, Wallace McCamant, shouted "Coolidge! Coolidge!", and other delegates in the crowd took up the chant; when McCormick was finished, McCamant nominated Coolidge and the delegates voted in the governor's favor.
- In fighting during the war between Russia and the combined armies of Poland and Ukraine, a concentration of 30 divisions of the Soviet Red Army retook Kiev.
- John C. Koons, the Assistant Postmaster General of the United States, answered a request for an interpretation of postal regulations from the Washington D.C. postmaster Merritt Chance, and ruled that children could not be sent through the mail by parcel post. Mr. Chance had received three applications to send children under regulations that permitted live animals to be sent through the mail. Koons, reviewing the regulation, pointed out that it was limited to "harmless live animals which do not require food or water." However, the United States Postal Service historian would confirm in 2016 that, soon after the Post Office Department had created parcel post in 1913, there were several instances of children being shipped by railroad through parcel post, the last-known instance having been on August 31, 1915.
- The 1920 Belmont Stakes, final race of the American horse racing Triple Crown, was run with only two horses, heavily favored Man O'War, who won the 1 3/8–mile race (11 f; 2.2 km) by 20 lengths over Donnacona.
- Born:
  - Dave Berg, American cartoonist, noted for his "The Lighter Side of..." satires for MAD magazine; in Brooklyn, New York City (d. 2002)
  - Jim Siedow, American film actor, known primarily as the villain in The Texas Chain Saw Massacre and its sequel; in Cheyenne, Wyoming (d. 2003)

== June 13, 1920 (Sunday) ==
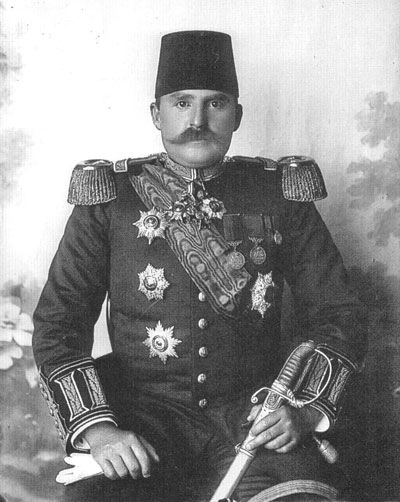
Essad Pasha

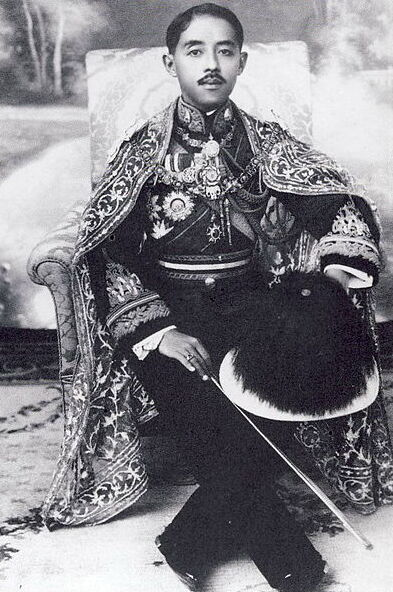
Crown Prince Bhuvanadh

- Essad Pasha Toptani, the nominal ruler of Albania, was assassinated by a 25-year-old Albanian student, Avni Rustemi, during a visit to Paris. Essad was departing the Hotel Continental when Rustemi stepped from behind a pillar and shot him twice.
- Born: Rolf Huisgen, German chemist, developed the Huisgen cycloaddition chemical reaction process for production of heterocyclic compounds; in Gerolstein, Weimar Republic (present-day Germany) (d. 2020)
- Died: Prince Chakrabongse Bhuvanath, 37, heir presumptive to the throne of Siam (now Thailand), younger brother of King Rama VI (Vajiravudh) and Chief of Staff of the Royal Siamese Army; died of pneumonia (b. 1883)

== June 14, 1920 (Monday) ==
- Henry, Baron Forster, a longtime member of the House of Commons of the United Kingdom, was designated as the successor to Sir Ronald Munro Ferguson, who was retiring from his position as Governor-General of Australia.
- The Cherokee National Forest, which now encompasses 1,024 square miles (2,650 km^{2}), was proclaimed by U.S. President Wilson.
- Sul Ross State University, founded in Alpine, Texas, opened as Sul Ross State Normal College, with 77 students. The college, which now has about 2,000 students, was named for the late Lawrence Sullivan Ross, who had served as Governor of Texas in the 19th century.
- Died:
  - Max Weber, 56, German sociologist and philosopher; died of influenza complications (b. 1864)
  - Anna Maria Mozzoni, 83, Italian suffragist and feminist (b. 1837)
  - Gabrielle Réjane, 64, French stage and silent film actress; died of influenza (b. 1856)

== June 15, 1920 (Tuesday) ==
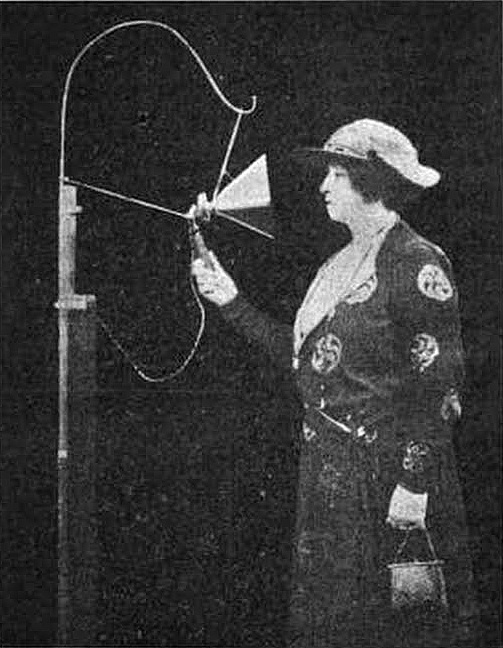
Nellie Melba

- Operatic soprano Nellie Melba became history's first well-known broadcaster when she sang two arias from a studio at Guglielmo Marconi's factory in Chelmsford, Essex, in England. The performance was sponsored by The Daily Mail newspaper in London.
- Three African American circus workers were lynched after a mob of several thousand white people surrounded the police station in Duluth, Minnesota, where six workers were being held in the jail at East Second Avenue and First Street. Charged with rape, the men were then subjected to a mock trial and heard from the accusers and the accused. Three were returned to their cells, but Isaac McGhie, Elmer Jackson, and Elias Clayton were taken out to the street and hanged between 11:30 and 11:45 that night. In 2003, statues of the three men would be erected in Duluth.
- Born: Alberto Sordi, Italian film actor and director, winner of seven David di Donatello film awards for Best Actor; in Rome (d. 2003)

== June 16, 1920 (Wednesday) ==
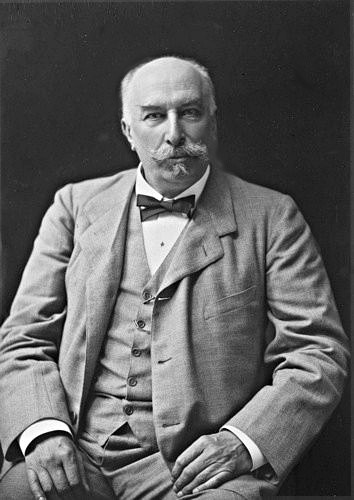
Giolitti

- A committee of jurists gathered at The Hague to plan the organization of the proposed Permanent Court of International Justice, a judicial body for the League of Nations.
- After taking administration of the former South Pacific territory of German Samoa under a League of Nations Mandate, the government of New Zealand seized the territory of the 292 German residents and then deported them on a ship back to Germany, without a trial. The Germans were placed on board the Main, a former German steamer transferred to British control, and then sent from Apia back to Germany. News of the forced exile was not revealed until three months later.
- Giovanni Giolitti was sworn in as the new Prime Minister of Italy, along with his cabinet of ministers, to succeed Francesco Nitti, who had resigned on June 9.
- What was believed to be the distance record for a "long distance wedding" took place between a bride, located in the United States at the First Presbyterian Church in Detroit, and a U.S. Navy sailor who was on the Pacific Ocean aboard the light cruiser USS Birmingham, reportedly 1,000 miles (1,600 km) off the coast of California. The ceremony, legal in Michigan at the time, was conducted by wireless radio.
- Born: José López Portillo, Mexican politician, 51st President of Mexico from 1976 to 1982; in Mexico City (d. 2004)

== June 17, 1920 (Thursday) ==
- The town of Craigmont, Idaho, was created from the merger of two rival towns, Ilo and Vollmer, which were separated only by a railroad track. A mock wedding ceremony was performed the next day between "Miss Ilo" and "Mr. Vollmer", portrayed by one actor from each town.
- St. Joseph's College for Women, located at 245 Clinton Avenue in Brooklyn, graduated its first class, with 14 women receiving their baccalaureate degrees.
- Born:
  - François Jacob, French biologist, 1965 Nobel Prize in Medicine laureate; in Nancy, Meurthe-et-Moselle département (d. 2013)
  - Setsuko Hara, Japanese film actress; as Masae Aida, in Yokohama (d. 2015)
  - John Waddy, British Army officer who was the first Director Special Forces for the Ministry of Defence Special Air Service; in Taunton, Somerset (d. 2020)
- Died: James H. Hyslop, 65, American psychologist, founder of the American Society for Psychical Research (b. 1854)

== June 18, 1920 (Friday) ==
- At Tirana, 330 Italian prisoners were killed in retaliation for the assassination of Essad Pasha.
- William Gibbs McAdoo, considered by many in the American press to be the likely Democratic nominee for president, announced that he would not permit his name to be put to a vote at the upcoming convention. McAdoo reversed himself nine days later, announcing that he would accept if nominated.
- Born:
  - Utta Danella, German author; in Leipzig, Weimar Republic (present-day Germany) (d. 2015)
  - Aster Berkhof, Belgian Flemish language novelist; as Lodewijk Paulina Van Den Bergh, in Rijkevorsel(d. 2020)
- Died:
  - George Walbridge Perkins, 58, American financier and politician (b. 1862)
  - John Macoun, 89, Irish-born Canadian botanist (b. 1831)

== June 19, 1920 (Saturday) ==
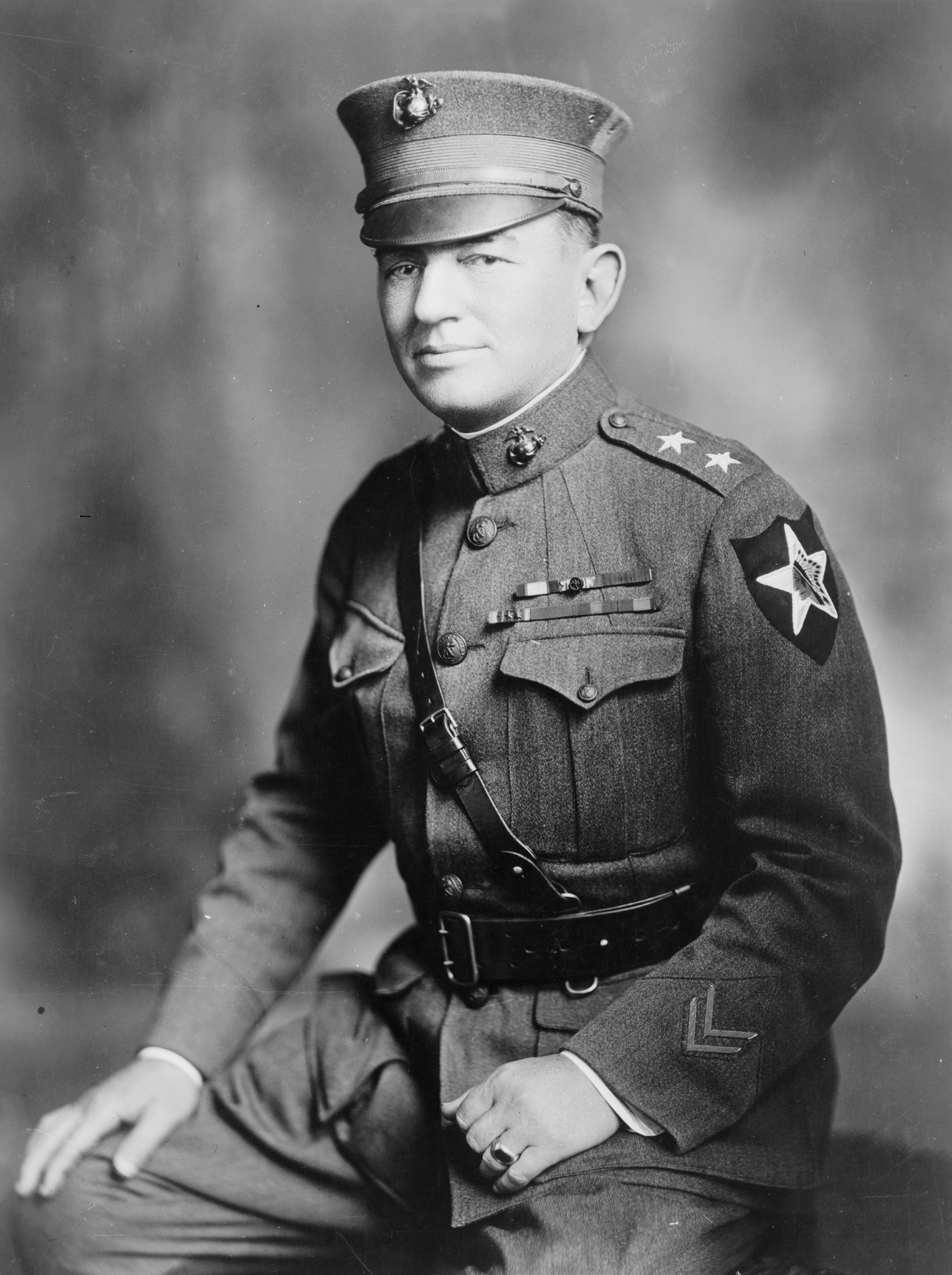
Commandant Lejeune

- Major General John A. Lejeune became Commandant of the United States Marine Corps, succeeding Major General George Barnett, by order of U.S. President Wilson. As Commandant of the U.S. Marines, Major General Lejeune demoted 23 major generals and 16 brigadier generals from their temporary wartime ranks given during World War I. Three major generals were reduced in rank to colonel (including Billy Mitchell, the Director of Military Aeronautics) while the other 20 were made brigadiers. Brigadier General Marlborough Churchill, a cryptanalyst in U.S. Army intelligence, was returned to his pre-war rank of major. It was expected that the reductions "will be only temporary, as new appointments must be made to fill vacancies which will occur when the army is reorganized under recent act of congress."
- Born: Eliana Navarro, Chilean poet; in Valparaíso (d. 2006)

== June 20, 1920 (Sunday) ==
- The Finalissima of Italy's top level in soccer, the Prima Categoria, football league was played at Bologna. F.C. Internazionale Milano (Inter Milan) defeated Livorno, 3 to 2.
- The town of Glasgow, West Virginia, was incorporated.
- Born:
  - Amos Tutuola, Nigerian novelist; as Amos Olatubosun Tutuola Odegbami, in Wasinmi (d. 1997)
  - Danny Cedrone, American rock music guitarist; as Donato Joseph Cedrone, Jamesville, New York (d. 1954, killed in accident)
  - Thomas Jefferson, African American jazz trumpeter; in Chicago (d. 1986)
- Died:
  - Dmitri Ivanovsky, 55, Russian botanist, discovered viruses when researching a blight to tobacco plants (b. 1864)
  - John Grigg, 82, New Zealand astronomer, co-discoverer of the periodic comet 26P/Grigg–Skjellerup (b. 1838)

== June 21, 1920 (Monday) ==
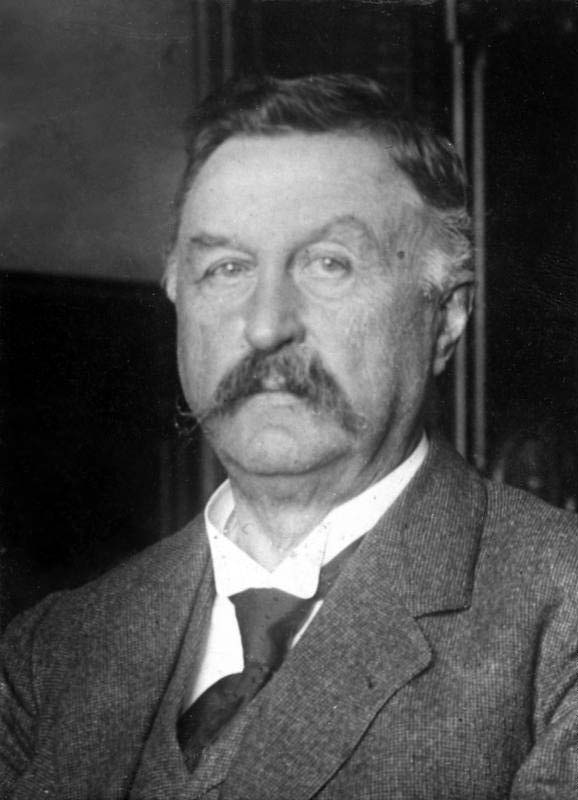
Chancellor Fehrenbach

- Constantin Fehrenbach became the new Chancellor of Germany and, after one failed try, formed a new coalition government on June 25, composed of members of his own Centre Party (Zentrum) and the German Democrats (DDP) from the old coalition, but combining with the right-wing German People's Party (DVP) and without the Social Democrats (SPD).
- At Boulogne, financial experts for the Allied powers announced that Germany's reparations for World War One should be fixed at 111 billion Deutschmarks (equivalent to 25 billion U.S. dollars), payable in gold at a minimum of three billion Deutschmarks (US$610,000,000) per year, to be completed by the year 1957, unless Germany recovered its prosperity, in which case the minimum payment would be changed according to an index.
- Italy withdrew all of its troops from Montenegro.
- The U.S. Army began issuing a new honor, the World War I Victory Medal.
- Born: Hans Gerschwiler, Swiss figure skater and 1947 world championship gold medalist; in Winterthur (d. 2017)

== June 22, 1920 (Tuesday) ==
- The patent application for the first pop-up toaster was filed by Charles P. Strite of Minneapolis for a "Bread-toaster with automatic bread ejection." Strite received U.S. Patent No. 1,394,450 on October 18, 1921.
- Prince Arthur of Connaught was appointed as the successor to Viscount Sydney Buxton, who announced that he would be was retiring in November as Governor-General of South Africa.
- The U.S. Army Motion Picture Service was established by the U.S. Department of War, for the purpose of showing movies at its military installations all over the world.
- Born:
  - Lester Wunderman, American advertising executive known as "the father of direct marketing"; in New York City (d. 2019)
  - Paul Frees, American comedian and voice actor; as Solomon Hersh Frees, in Chicago (d. 1986)

== June 23, 1920 (Wednesday) ==
- Charles F. Murphy, who had been the leader of New York City's Democratic Party political machine as "Boss Murphy of Tammany Hall," was indicted along with other political officials in the city, on charges of conspiracy to defraud the government of excess profits taxes.

== June 24, 1920 (Thursday) ==
- Władysław Grabski became the new Prime Minister of Poland, succeeding Leopold Skulski.
- The British Army restored order in Derry by driving fighting Catholic Nationalist and Protestant Unionist factions off of the streets and out of their strongholds. According to the British authorities, 17 people had been killed and 29 injured in four days of rioting
- Greek troops in Turkey captured the city of Alaşehir, which had been known until the fall of the Byzantine Empire as Philadélphia, and took 8,000 Turkish prisoners. The city of Akhisar fell on the same day.
- The Northern Baptist Convention, meeting in Buffalo, New York, became the second American denomination of Christian churches to vote to withdraw from the Interchurch World Movement effective June 30. The members agreed to pay $2.5 million that it had pledged in the nationwide fundraiser by Protestant denominations in April, but to otherwise halt aid immediately. At the end of May, the Presbyterian Church terminated its association with the Interchurch movement.

== June 25, 1920 (Friday) ==
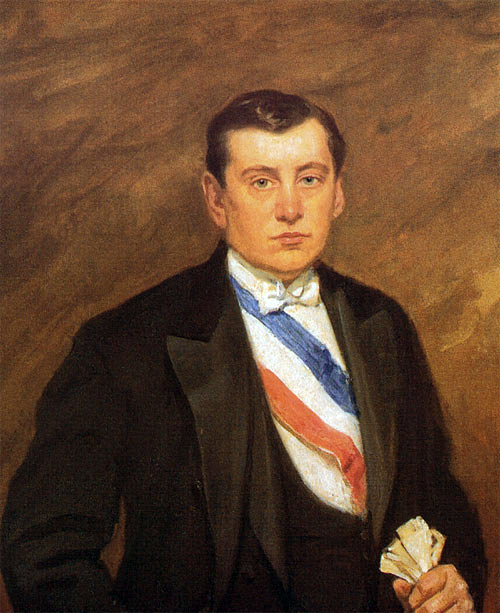
Alessandri

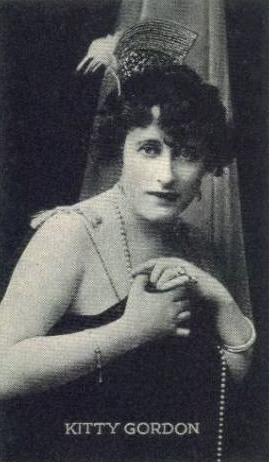
Kitty Gordon

- Arturo Alessandri won the 1920 Chilean presidential election. This was the last Chilean election to have been decided by the Chilean electoral college. Luis Barros Borgoño won a majority of popular votes by a margin of 1,007 votes (83,100 to 82,083) but Alessandri had 179 electoral votes to Barros's 175.
- Russia's White Army General Pyotr Wrangel defeated the Soviet army in the Crimea and captured 10,000 prisoners.
- Kitty Gordon, British stage actress who had left London to perform in the United States, accidentally shot and wounded another actor while she was performing in a vaudeville show. Miss Gordon's partner in the vaudeville act, Jack Wilson, had brought along a pistol "for the double duty of serving as a stage 'prop' and guarding Miss Gordon's '$250,000 worth of jewels'." While reloading the gun with blanks, Wilson overlooked having a loaded cartridge in the chamber. Waiting off stage was the next act in the program, the acrobatic trio of Page, Hack and Mack. The bullet struck Joseph A. Hack and wounded him. Hack was hospitalized, but recovered from his injuries.
- Born:
  - Jeanne Tomasini, French historical novelist; as Jeanne Lucienne Maestracci, in L'Estaque, Bouches-du-Rhône département (d. 2022)
  - Lassie Lou Ahern, American child actress, one of the last survivors of the silent film era; in Los Angeles (d. 2018)

== June 26, 1920 (Saturday) ==
- Royal Navy battleships from the United Kingdom aided the Greek invasion of Turkey by bombarding the city of İzmit, a base of operations for Turkish nationalists. A dispatch from Greece reported that 1,000 Turks had been killed.
- António Maria da Silva formed a new government for Portugal, replacing José Ramos Preto as Prime Minister of Portugal. Ramos had served for 11 days before resigning on June 18.
- Lou Gehrig, a 17-year old player for the New York School of Commerce high school team, got his first publicity for his baseball ability in the "World Series of High Schools" tournament held at Cubs Park in Chicago. In front of 10,000 spectators, Gehrig hit a grand slam home run over the right field wall in the ninth inning for a 12 to 6 win over Chicago's Lane Tech High School. Several newspapers, including the New York Daily News, misspelled the future Hall of Famer's name in their reports.

== June 27, 1920 (Sunday) ==
- British Army Brigadier General Cuthbert Lucas was kidnapped by the Sinn Féin in Ireland while fishing on the River Blackwater near Fermoy in County Cork. After a month in captivity and the threat of execution, General Lucas was able to escape on July 30.
- Bertram G. Goodhue was selected as the architect for the new Nebraska State Capitol, as a panel of three non-resident architects favored his 15-story tall proposal over nine other plans that were submitted. One newspaper referred to Goodhue's design as a "freak type of tower" and a "Woolworth building capitol" favored by a group of outsiders that "was evidently partial to the New York skyscraper style of architecture," and complained that "The capitol commission had previously tied its own hands to such an extent that it was forced to take the 'jury's' selection and could not use its own judgment, if it had so desired, in giving the preference to something more suited to Nebraska's conditions and western ideals."
- Born: Fernando Riera, Chilean football player and manager, who played for the Chile national football team from 1942 to 1950 and later managed the team from 1958 to 1962; in Santiago (d. 2010)
- Died: Adolphe-Basile Routhier, 81, Canadian judge, author and lyricist, wrote the original French version of the Canadian national anthem "O Canada" (b. 1839)

== June 28, 1920 (Monday) ==
- The Democratic Party National Convention opened at San Francisco.
- Governor of Tennessee Albert H. Roberts announced that he would call a special session of the state legislature after the state Democratic primaries, directing the state senators and representatives to meet on August 9 for purposes of considering the proposed 19th Amendment to the U.S. Constitution, granting all American women the right to vote. At the time, 35 of the 48 U.S. states had ratified the amendment, and only one more was required to provide the necessary two-thirds for it to become law.
- U.S. Army Sergeant Boterill inadvertently set a record for highest altitude for a parachute jump, when a high wind opened his chute while he was riding in a two-seat airplane at 20,000 feet (6,100 m) near Dayton, Ohio. Botterill sustained a broken arm when he struck the plane's rudder and was reportedly "carried for miles by the wind before he descended nearly four miles to the earth."
- Born: Clarissa Eden, British socialite and memoirist, niece of Winston Churchill, wife of Prime Minister Anthony Eden; as Anne Clarissa Spencer-Churchill, in Kensington, London (d. 2021)

== June 29, 1920 (Tuesday) ==
- Warren G. Harding, the Republican nominee for the U.S. presidential election recorded a campaign speech to be duplicated on phonographic records that could be played at political rallies. The theme of Harding's address was "America First," with the closing statement "Call it the selfishness of nationality if you will; I think it an inspiration to patriotic devotion; to safeguard America first; to stabilize America first; to exalt America first; and to live for and revere America first." Harding and vice-presidential nominee Calvin Coolidge, who recorded a separate speech, made few public appearances during the actual campaign. The records were put in circulation on July 4.
- Born: Ray Harryhausen, American film animator and pioneer in special effects, particularly the perfection of stop motion; in Los Angeles (d. 2013)

== June 30, 1920 (Wednesday) ==
- The month of June, 1920, closed with the highest ever inflation rate that has ever been recorded by the U.S. Bureau of Labor Statistics, with the Consumer Price Index later showing the annual inflation rate peaking, with prices for consumer goods and services being 23.7 percent higher in June 1920 than they had been at the end of June 1919. In the 12 months that followed June 1920, prices went back down 15.8 percent.
- The Turkish delegation to the Paris peace conference announced that it would recognize the independence of Armenia, Hedjaz (now Saudi Arabia), Syria (now Syria and Lebanon), Mesopotamia (now Iraq) and Palestine (now Israel and Jordan). Turkey also renounced its rights to former territory in Egypt, to control the Suez Canal and the Sudan, and to eight islands in the Aegean Sea, as well as recognizing France's protectorates over Tunisia and Morocco and the United Kingdom's annexation of Cyprus. The Turks refused to cede the city of İzmir (Smyrna) and protested the cession of Eastern Thrace to Greece.
- Born:
  - Soedarpo Sastrosatomo, Indonesian banker, diplomat and journalist, founder of CIMB Niaga; in Pangkalan Susu, Dutch East Indies (present-day Indonesia) (d. 2007)
  - Eleanor Ross Taylor, American poet; as Eleanor Ross, in Norwood, North Carolina (d. 2011)
  - Zeno Colò, Italian slalom ski racer, 1952 Olympic gold medalist; in Cutigliano (d. 1993)
