= Harold A. Robe =

American lyricist (1881-1946)

Harold A. Robe (1881–1946) was an early 20th century American lyricist. He is known for penning several popular songs, most notably Dear Old Pal of Mine. For many of his songs, Robe collaborated with composer Gitz Rice. Other notable songs include, Because You're Here, Mary Lee (Merrily I'll Come to You), and Never Swap Horses When You're Crossing a Stream.
