= May 1920 =

Month in 1920

<<	May 1920					>>
Su	Mo	Tu	We	Th	Fr	Sa
						1
2	3	4	5	6	7	8
9	10	11	12	13	14	15
16	17	18	19	20	21	22
23	24	25	26	27	28	29
30	31

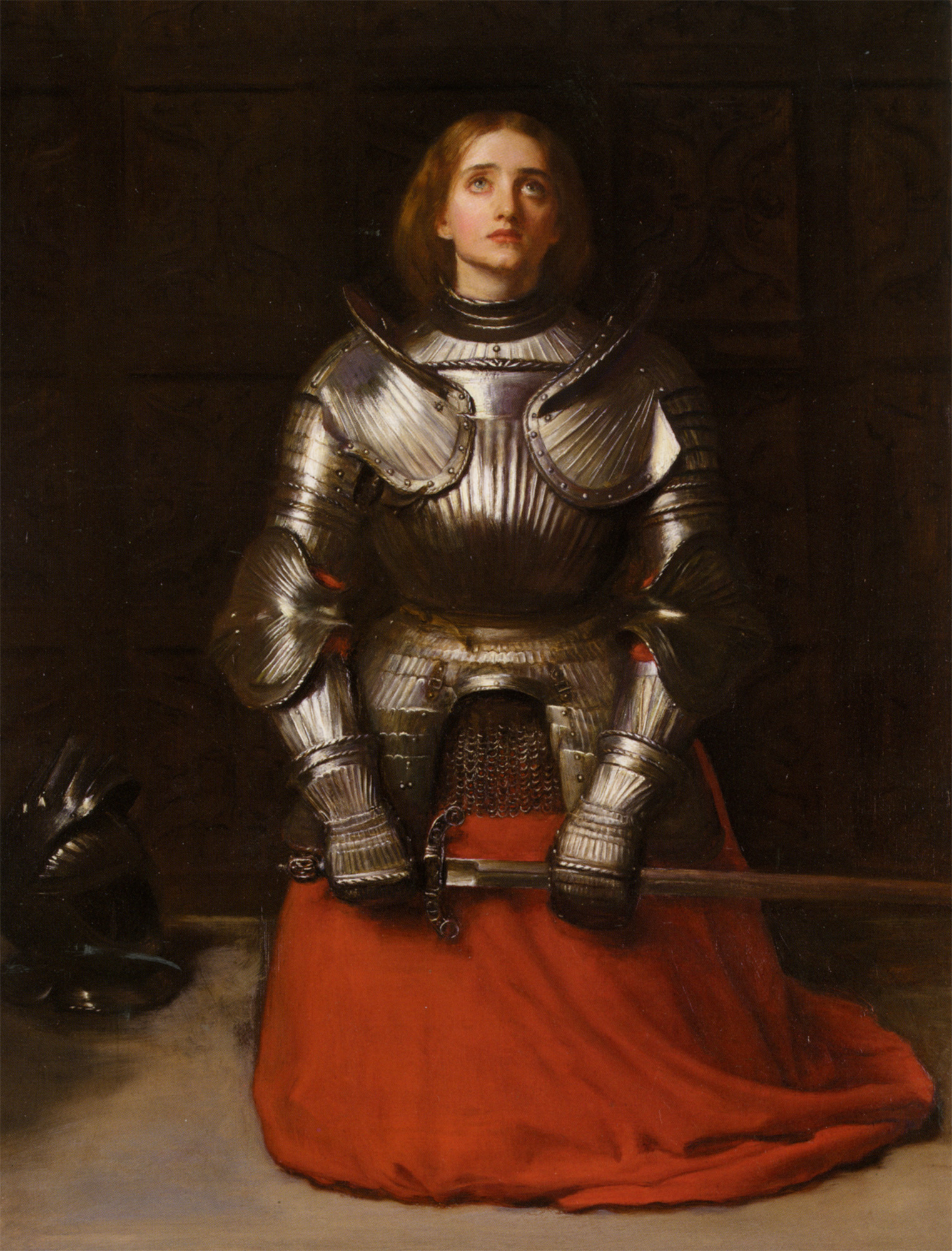
May 16, 1920: Joan of Arc canonized

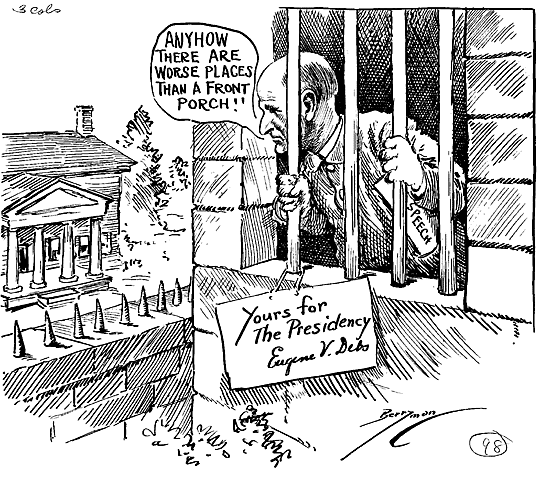
May 13, 1920: Prisoner Eugene Debs nominated for U.S. president

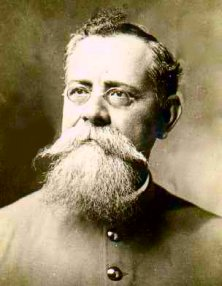
May 21, 1920: Deposed Mexican President Carranza assassinated

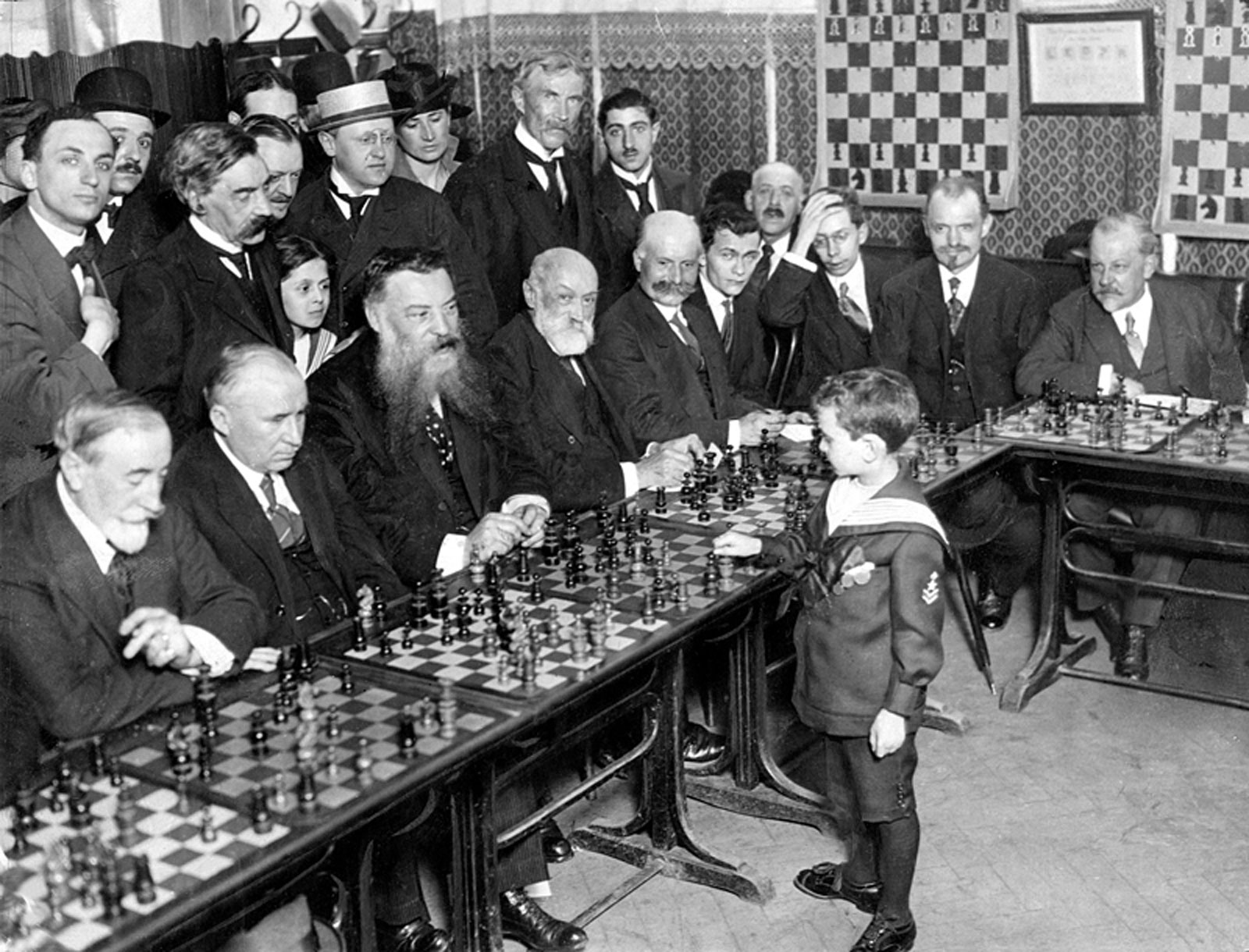
May 17, 1920: future U.S. chess champion Reshevsky, age 8, beats 20 challengers

The following events occurred in May 1920:

== May 1, 1920 (Saturday) ==
- A game between the Boston Braves and the Brooklyn Robins (later the Brooklyn Dodgers and now the Los Angeles Dodgers) lasted 26 innings, setting a major league record that still stands. The score was tied, 1 to 1, after nine innings and then continued for 17 scoreless innings, before being called for darkness. On May 8, 1984, a 7 to 6 win by the Chicago White Sox over the Milwaukee Brewers went 25 innings.
- International Labor Day celebrations in Paris degenerated into riots and a nationwide railway strike began across France. In most locations around the world, the May Day observances were peaceful
- The U.S. Department of War announced that it had discharged 180,581 U.S. Army reserve soldiers since the November 11, 1918, armistice, and that 2,490 others had resigned.
- Born: Louis Siminovitch, Canadian molecular biologist and pioneer in human genetics; in Montreal (d. 2021)
- Died: Princess Margaret of Connaught, 38, English princess who was married to Gustav, Crown Prince of Sweden, died of sepsis following a mastoidectomy. (b. 1882)

== May 2, 1920 (Sunday) ==
- Canada consolidated nine steel, coal, shipbuilding and transportation companies into one entity, British Empire Steel Corporation (BESCO), larger than any British steel concern and second only to United States Steel. The merger included Dominion Steel Corporation, Nova Scotia Steel and Coal Company, Canadian Steamship Lines, Maritime Rail Company, Canada Foundries and Forgings, and four shipbuilding companies The company later sold its assets to the Dominion Steel and Coal Corporation.
- The first game of baseball's Negro National League was played, at Washington Park in Indianapolis, Indiana. A crowd of 6,000 watched the Indianapolis ABCs defeat the Chicago American Giants, 4 to 2, in the first game, and 11 to 4 in the second.
- Born: Preben Neergaard, Danish director; in Farum (d. 1990)

== May 3, 1920 (Monday) ==
- Noël Coward's first play to be produced, I'll Leave It to You, was given its opening performance, at the Gaiety Theatre in Manchester; although it was a success in Manchester, the play flopped when it was transferred to London, where it ran for only 37 performances after opening on July 21 at the New Theatre (now called the Noël Coward Theatre).
- A Bolshevik coup failed to topple the government of the Democratic Republic of Georgia.
- French dock workers and coal miners went on a nationwide strike, two days after the railroad strike began.
- Textile workers across Massachusetts went out on strike, with 15,000 weavers leaving from 37 mills.

== May 4, 1920 (Tuesday) ==
- King Ferdinand I of Romania issued a decree creating "National Hero Day," establishing the practice of a government-supported cult of personality in the Eastern European nation.
- The town of Connelly Springs, North Carolina, was incorporated.

== May 5, 1920 (Wednesday) ==
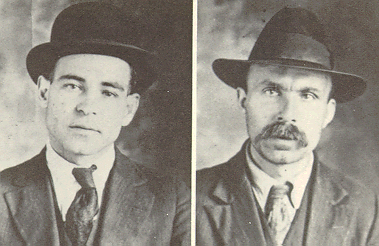
Mike Sacco and Bert Vanzetti

- Nicola "Mike" Sacco and Bartolomeo "Bert" Vanzetti were arrested in Brockton, Massachusetts, for the April 15 murder in Boston of a payroll clerk and his guard. On April 18, a car seen fleeing the scene of the murder had been dropped off at the Elm Square Garage in West Bridgewater by four men. Police waited for more than two weeks for someone to pick up the car on May 5, the four men came to get the car, then departed after the garage keeper tried to stall them. Two fled on motorcycles, and the other two climbed on to a streetcar that was traveling toward Brockton. Two Brockton officers then stopped the trolley and arrested Sacco and Vanzetti, who matched the description given of the visitors to the garage. Both suspects were carrying pistols, and were detained without bail on concealed weapons charges. Sacco and Vanzetti would spend the rest of their lives in prison until their executions in 1927.
- The Allied Powers gave Hungary until May 16 to agree to a separate peace treaty.
- Born: Jon Naar, British-born American photographer; in London (d. 2017)

== May 6, 1920 (Thursday) ==
- Mike O'Dowd, the world middleweight boxing champion, lost his title to a relatively-unknown challenger, Johnny Wilson, in a 12-round decision in Boston. "The defeat of O'Dowd was a big surprise," a wire service reporter wrote, "for Wilson has been boxing no better than second rate boxers in New England cities." Wilson, who had been in only three professional bouts before meeting O'Dowd, would hold the world title for more than three years.
- Born: Sir Kamisese Mara, Fijian politician, first Prime Minister of Fiji from 1970 to 1987, second President of Fiji from 1993 to 2000; in Lomaloma, island of Vanua Balavu (d. 2004)
- Died: Leonida Bissolati, 63, Italian socialist activist and member of the Chamber of Deputies, died of pneumonia while recovering from surgery. (b. 1857)

== May 7, 1920 (Friday) ==
- Troops from Poland and Ukraine retook Kiev from Russia, and the government of the Ukrainian People's Republic returned to the city. The Soviets retook Kiev on June 12 and soon annexed Ukraine into the Soviet Union.
- Soviet Russia recognized the independence of the Democratic Republic of Georgia in the signing of the Treaty of Moscow. Russian troops would invade the country only six months later.
- Mexican President Venustiano Carranza and most of the members of his government left Mexico City by train, but were captured two days later near Acapulco. Before departing with Carranza, General Francisco Murguía ordered the execution of rebel officers who were being held in the penitentiary at Santiago Tlatelolco.
- Cortland Smith, chief of the American Press Association, testified before a U.S. Senate committee that unless a paper shortage was addressed by the government, half of U.S. newspapers would be required to suspend publication.
- At Mineola, New York, the first intercollegiate airplane races took place, as Yale University's team won the sporting competition.
- Morecambe Football Club, now a team in EFL League Two, was founded during a meeting at the West View Hotel on the promenade of the coastal resort of Morecambe in Lancashire. The team is nicknamed "The Shrimps" as an homage to the shrimping industry on Morecambe Bay.
- Born: Rendra Karno, Indonesian film actor; as Raden Soekarno, in Kutoarjo, Dutch East Indies (present-day Indonesia) (d. 1985)
- Died: Hugh Thomson, 59, Irish book illustrator; died of heart disease (b. 1860)

== May 8, 1920 (Saturday) ==
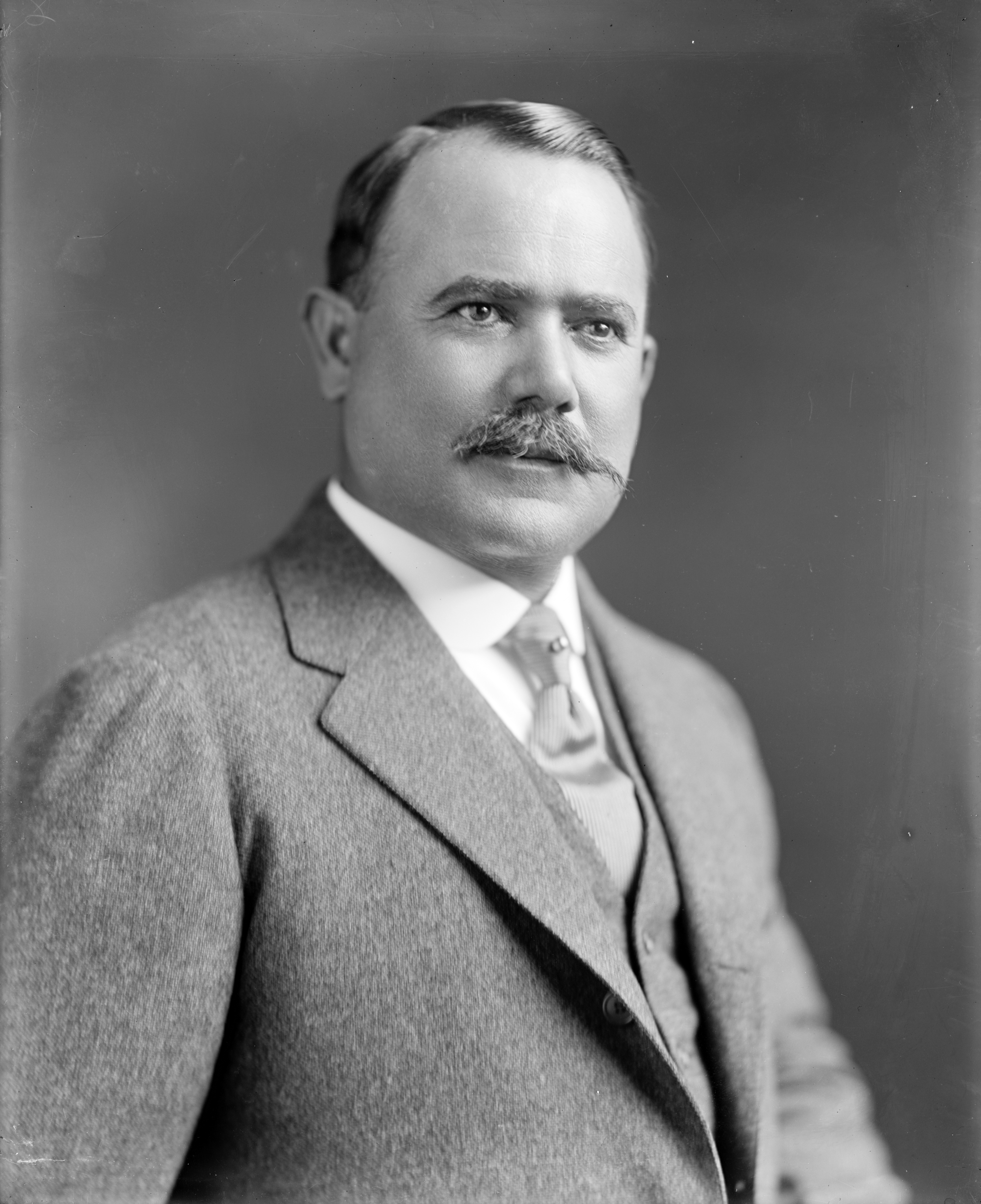
Obregón

- With President Carranza gone, Álvaro Obregón and his troops entered Mexico City, where he would become the new president. In a dispatch the same day to the revolution's leader, Sonoran Governor Adolfo de la Huerta, Obregon reported that the first forces to enter the capital had been those of General Sidronio Méndez the day before.
- The 1920 Kentucky Derby took place with 17 thoroughbred horses, the most up to that time, but without the famous Man o'War, who would win the other two jewels of the American triple crown of horse racing, the Preakness and the Belmont Stakes. Paul Jones finished first and Upset— the only horse to beat Man o'War in a race— was second.
- Born:
  - Saul Bass, American graphic artist and filmmaker; in The Bronx, New York (d. 1996)
  - Tom of Finland, Finnish gay pornographer; as Touko Valio Laaksonen, in Kaarina (d. 1991)
- Died: Johan Reinhold Sahlberg, 74, Finnish entomologist (b. 1845)

== May 9, 1920 (Sunday) ==
- The train carrying former Mexican president Venustiano Carranza was captured by revolutionary forces at Apizaco in the state of Tlaxcala, but Carranza had departed. Mexico's revolutionary leader, General Álvaro Obregón, pledged that Carranza's life would be spared.
- Julio Acosta García was inaugurated as the 24th President of Costa Rica.
- C.A. de Paris defeated Le Havre AC, 2 to 1 at the Stade Bergeyre, in front of a crowd of 7,000 on two consecutive goals by Henri Bard to win the Coupe de France, the championship of the Fédération Française de Football.
- Born: Mitsuko Mori, Japanese stage actress; as Mitsu Murakami, in Kyoto (d. 2012)
- Died: John H. Vincent, 88, American Methodist bishop, co-founder of the Chautauqua Assembly (b. 1832)

== May 10, 1920 (Monday) ==
- Elections were held in Japan for the 464 seats in the nation's House of Representatives.
- Mexico's revolutionary government announced that it was in control of all but three of the nation's 28 states. The only states that had remained loyal to the government of former President Carranza were Campeche, Chiapas and Yucatán.
- In what is now called the "Miss France" beauty competition, Agnès Souret was elected "The most beautiful woman in France" ("La plus belle femme de France").
- Bolsheviks in Armenia briefly seized control of the capital at Alexandropol (now Gyumri) to proclaim a Soviet republic to be annexed by the Soviet Union. The attempt was suppressed by the Armenian army by the end of the week. In September, the Turkish-Armenian War would pave the way for what the May Uprising had sought to accomplish. After the signing of the Treaty of Alexandropol on December 3, the new government would create the Armenian Soviet Socialist Republic that would be a constituent part of the Soviet Union until 1991.
- H. H. Asquith's proposed amendment to the Irish Home Rule bill, which would have created a separate Parliament for Ireland, failed in the United Kingdom House of Commons by a margin of 55 to 259.
- Born: Richard Adams, English novelist, author of Watership Down; in Wash Common, West Berkshire (d. 2016)
- Died: John Wesley Hyatt, 82, American inventor, created the first plastic compounds, including the celluloid used for the first motion pictures (b. 1837)

== May 11, 1920 (Tuesday) ==
- The town of Jackson, Wyoming— now a popular ski resort commonly referred to by the name of the valley, Jackson Hole—- became the first American municipality to elect a government composed entirely of women, as a slate of five female candidates was favored by a 2-to-1 majority over five male candidates. Grace Miller was elected Mayor, and Mae Deloney, Genevieve Van Fleck, Faustina Haight and Rose Crabtree (who defeated her husband, candidate Henry Crabtree) were elected to the city council.
- The French government of Premier Millerand moved to dissolve the General Federation of Labor.
- Poland and Ukraine recaptured Odessa from the Soviets.
- The proposed treaty created at the San Remo conference was presented to Ottoman Empire officials at Paris.
- The U.S. Senate approved an alternative to the Knox peace resolution in order to eliminate any reference to the Treaty of Versailles.

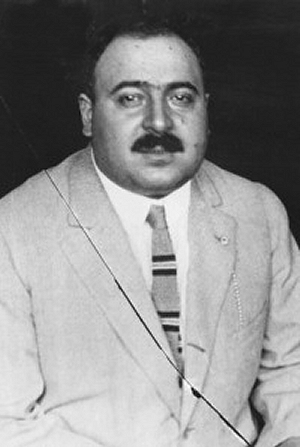
James "Big Jim" Colosimo

- Born: Denver Pyle, American actor and director; in Bethune, Colorado (d. 1997)
- Died:
  - James "Big Jim" Colosimo, 42, Italian-born, American gangster in the Chicago underworld; shot and killed in an ambush by his lieutenant (b. 1878)
  - W. D. Howells, 83, American novelist and playwright; died of influenza (b. 1837)

== May 12, 1920 (Wednesday) ==
- Raids by Sinn Féin across Ireland destroyed 20 tax collection offices and 50 military barracks.
- Elections were held in Romania for both houses of the Parlamentul României. The Partidul Poporului (People's Party), led by Prime Minister Alexandru Averescu, won 206 of the 366 seats in the Chamber of Deputies, while the Partidul National Roman (Romanian National Party), led by recently dismissed Premier Alexandru Vaida-Voevod, lost all but 27 of its 169 seats in the Chamber and all but 14 of its 76 seats in the 166 member Senate.
- The German Reich enacted the Reichslichtspielgesetz (the Reich Moving Picture Law) to censor the film industry.
- U.S. President Wilson signed a resolution providing for the issuance of the Pilgrim Half Dollar in time to celebrate the 300th anniversary of the November 9, 1620, landing of the Mayflower on American soil. Over 200,000 of the 50 cent pieces were minted in October.
- Born:
  - John Tyler Bonner, American evolutionary biologist; in New York City (d. 2019)
  - Gerald Stapleton, South African-born British Royal Air Force pilot and fighter ace, shot down 8 enemy aircraft during the Battle of Britain; as Basil Gerald Stapleton, in Durban (d. 2010)

== May 13, 1920 (Thursday) ==
- Despite serving a federal prison term for violation of U.S. espionage laws during World War I, Eugene V. Debs of Indiana was nominated as the Socialist Party of America presidential candidate for 1920. On May 29, Debs accepted the nomination at the Atlanta Penitentiary, while wearing his prison uniform, in "a scene unique in the history of American politics— the tendering of a nomination for the Presidency of a nation to a man serving a prison term for violating the laws of that nation, a man whose prison term would outlast two terms as President if he were elected, who can make no campaign addresses, who will not be permitted even to issue campaign statements or to write political letters."
- U.S. President Wilson vetoed an attempt by Congress to exercise control over the printing of all government publications. The measure had been included in an appropriations bill to fund the government for the 1921 fiscal year that would start on July 1, and proposed to give Congress control of printing and "all government mimeographing, multigraphing and other duplication processes, other than official correspondence and office records," including press releases. In his veto message, Wilson said that the bill gave Congress censorship power and that it was "an encroachment on the functions of the Executive branch and incompatible with good government" in the separation of powers. Attempts to override the veto failed the next day when the U.S. House of Representatives was unable to obtain the necessary two-thirds majority in a vote along party lines, with 170 Republicans for and 127 Democrats against.
- Born: Gareth Morris, British flute player; in Clevedon, Somersetshire (d. 2007)

== May 14, 1920 (Friday) ==
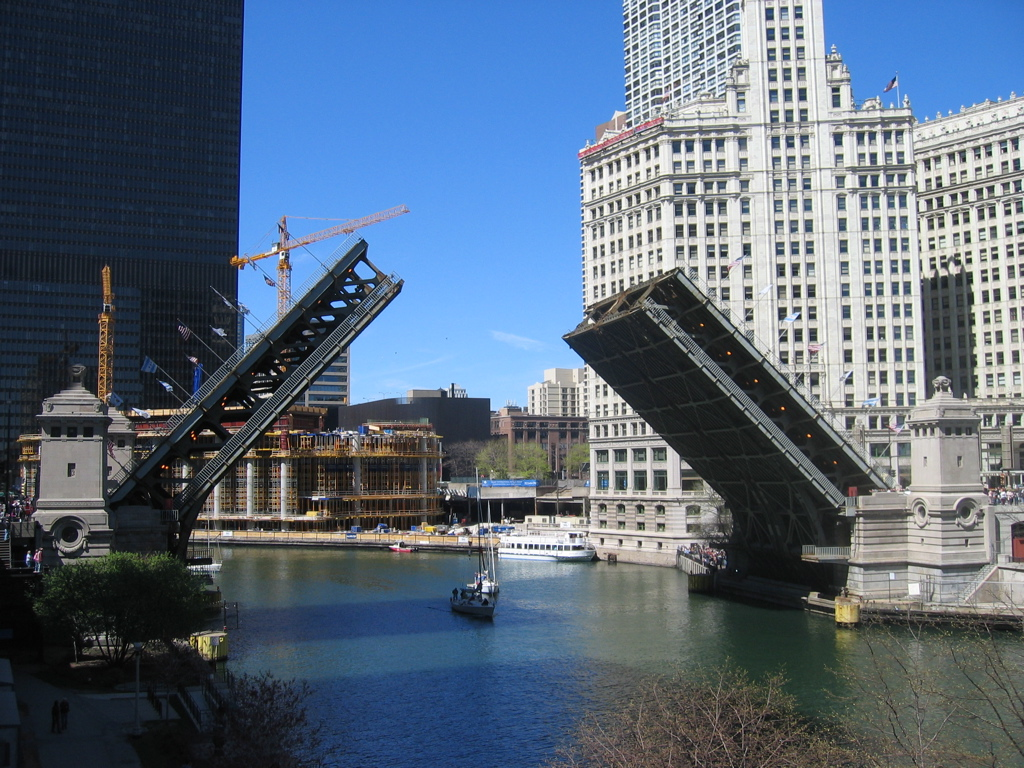
Chicago's DuSable Bridge

- The Michigan Avenue Bridge over the Chicago River, a bascule bridge (a bridge where the spans can be tilted upward in order to allow tall ships to pass) was opened to the public in Chicago at 4:00 in the afternoon. Proposed almost 30 years earlier in 1891 as a link between the parks of the north side and south side of the city, the bridge began to be constructed in 1918 and is now called the DuSable Bridge.
- Warren G. Harding, U.S. Senator for Ohio and a candidate for the Republican presidential nomination, first gave his "Return to normalcy" speech that would become the theme of his successful campaign for U.S. President. Harding's speech to the Home Market Club of Boston forever linked the archaic word "normalcy" (a synonym for normality) to the Harding presidency.
- Sonoran governor Adolfo de la Huerta, who had toppled the government of President Carranza, called the Mexican Congress into session to ask for the election of a temporary president until constitutional reform could be made.
- U.S., British and French Navy ships arrived at Veracruz to enforce peace.
- Most of Mexican President Carranza's cabinet was captured by rebels who seized the train near San Marcos in the Veracruz state. Carranza, however, was able to break through rebel lines and his party took all the minted coins embezzled from the national treasury.

== May 15, 1920 (Saturday) ==
- The U.S. Senate approved the peace resolution proposal of Senator Philander C. Knox of Pennsylvania. The measure passed, 43 to 38, after three Democrats voted in favor, preventing a 40 to 41 defeat. The Senate then sent it back to the House.
- Born: Nasrallah Boutros Sfeir, Lebanese cleric, Patriarch of the Maronite Church and Roman Catholic Cardinal; in Rayfoun (d. 2011)

== May 16, 1920 (Sunday) ==
- Joan of Arc was canonized as a saint of the Roman Catholic Church, almost 500 years after her death. Over 30,000 people attended the ceremony in Rome, including 140 descendants of her family, as Pope Benedict XV presided over the rite in St. Peter's Basilica.
- Voters in a referendum in Switzerland decided in favor of joining the League of Nations. Of the 19 cantons and the six "half-cantons", joining the League was favored in the French-speaking areas and opposed in those where German was the lingua franca. "Never in the history of Switzerland did so many voters go to the booths as today," The New York Times observed. The final result was 11½ cantons for and 10½ against.
- Szmul Rzeszewski (later Samuel Reshevsky), an 8-year-old boy, made world headlines when he defeated 20 challengers in Paris, including some of the best chess players in France. As an adult, Reshevsky would become the U.S. Chess Champion on three occasions between 1936 and 1972.

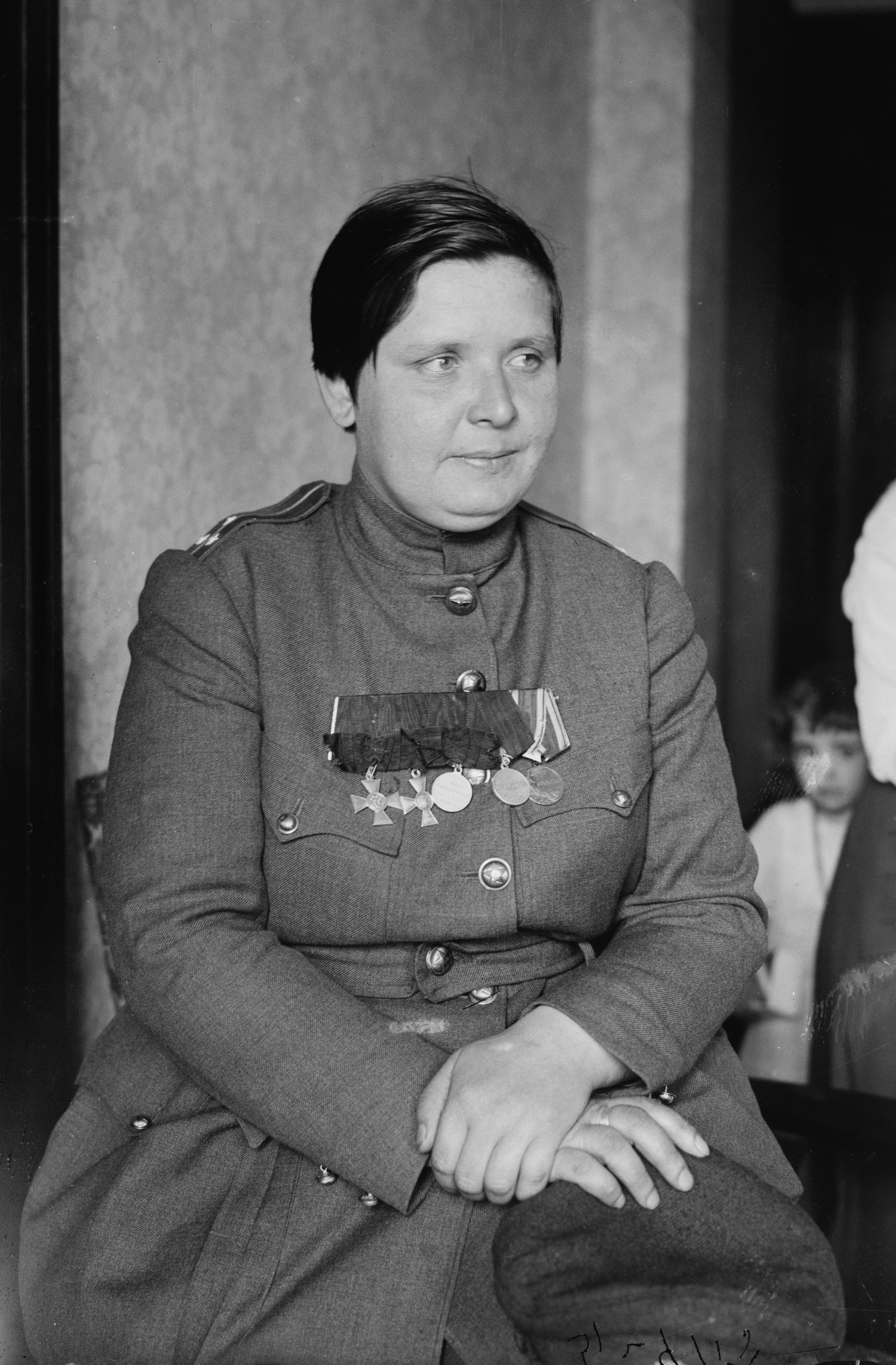
Maria Bochkareva

- Died:
  - José Gómez Ortega, 25, Spanish matador who fought as "Joselito" was fatally gored during a bullfight.(b. 1895)
  - Levi P. Morton, 96, Vice President of the United States from 1889 to 1893 (b. 1824)
  - Maria Bochkareva, 30, woman soldier for the White Army against the Soviet Red Army and founder of the Women's Battalion of Death was executed by the Soviet government.(b. 1889)

== May 17, 1920 (Monday) ==
- Seven months after its founding on October 7, the first airline flight for KLM (Koninklijke Luchtvaart Maatschappij) Royal Dutch Airlines was made. British pilot Jerry Shaw took off from London on a leased De Havilland DH.16 and transported two journalists and a stack of newspapers on the inaugural flight, which landed at the Schiphol Airport at Amsterdam.
- The United States had only 20 years left before its oil supply would be exhausted, President Wilson warned the U.S. Senate, submitting a report from the State Department. In 1920, the U.S. was the largest oil producer, supplying 69 percent of the world's demand for oil, but had already exhausted 40% of the estimated American oil lands and would, at the current rate of depletion, become dry by 1940 if no further discoveries were made.
- Born: Lydia Wideman, Finnish skier, Olympic gold medalist for women's cross-country skiing in 1952; in Vilppula (d. 2019)

== May 18, 1920 (Tuesday) ==
- Man O'War, who had been held out of the Kentucky Derby on May 8, won the Preakness Stakes, the second jewel of the American Triple Crown of thoroughbred horse racing. The race, nowadays conducted on the third Saturday in May, was held on a weekday just ten days after the Kentucky Derby. Derby second-place finisher Upset, who had become the first and only horse to defeat Man O'War in a race on August 13, 1919, finished second to Man O'War by two lengths in the Preakness. Derby winner Paul Jones was not entered in the race.
- The Battle of Hamdh began between 2,000 Saudi and 100 Kuwaiti forces and lasted six days.
- Born: Karol Wojtyla, Polish Roman Catholic priest and saint who served as Pope John Paul II from 1978 until his death in 2005; in Wadowice (d. 2005)

== May 19, 1920 (Wednesday) ==
- Twelve people were shot to death in gun battles in the coal mining town of Matewan, West Virginia, including Matewan's mayor, Cabell Testamen, and seven members of the Baldwin-Felts Detective Agency.
- Born:
  - Tina Strobos, Dutch physician, resistance leader and rescuer of Jewish refugees during the Nazi occupation of the Netherlands; as Tineke Buchter, in Amsterdam (d. 2012)
  - Ted Knap, American journalist and White House correspondent; as Thaddeus L. Knap, in Milwaukee, Wisconsin (d. 2023)

== May 20, 1920 (Thursday) ==
- The first Canadian entertainment radio broadcast took place from the Marconi Building in Montreal, as experimental station XWA transmitted music to a meeting of the Royal Society of Canada at the Château Laurier, a hotel in Ottawa at 9:50 in the evening. J. O. G. Cann, chief engineer for XWA, performed the role of what would be known later as a "disc jockey," starting the transmission with the words "Hello, Ottawa; we will now play a record for you." Cann then played a recording of "Dear Old Pal of Mine" sung by John McCormick, followed by live singing by Dorothy Lutton, beginning with "Believe Me, If All Those Endearing Young Charms."
- Born:
  - Betty Driver, British actress, best known for her role as Betty Williams on Coronation Street for 42 years until her death; as Elizabeth Mary Driver, in Leicester, Leicestershire (d. 2011)
  - John Cruickshank, Scottish pilot of the Royal Air Force and the last surviving recipient of the Victoria Cross during World War II; in Aberdeen (d. 2025)
  - Domenico Leccisi, Italian politician, stole the body of Benito Mussolini from his unmarked grave in 1946; in Molfetta (d. 2008)

== May 21, 1920 (Friday) ==
- Recently deposed Mexican President Venustiano Carranza was murdered, along with six of his fellow officers, after his encampment was discovered near the town of San Antonio Tlaxcalantongo in the state of Puebla. Two weeks earlier, President Carranza had fled Mexico City as rebel forces had entered the capital. The day before, one of his former officers, Colonel Rodolfo Herrero, approached Carranza's men and offered the former president safe escort to Tlaxcalantongo and took him to lodging. At 4:00 in the morning, Herrero's forces then surrounded the safehouse and fired into it while he was sleeping. Former Ambassador to the U.S. Ignacio Bonillas, whom Carranza had selected as a candidate for the scheduled 1920 presidential election, survived. Along with 32 other officers, Bonillas sent a telegram to the new president, Álvaro Obregón, pledging "We are at your service" and asking permission to bring Carranza's body to the capital for burial. Obregón replied, "It is very strange that a group of officers who vouched their loyalty and honor... should have permitted him to be assassinated instead of complying with your duty."
- Grover Cleveland Bergdoll, known for being a wealthy army deserter who was serving a jail sentence at the Governors Island prison in New York, escaped from custody after the prison allowed him a furlough to his mother's mansion in Philadelphia. Bergdoll, who had been accompanied by two prison guards, went into a room to answer a ringing telephone on the second floor and then, "leaving the house by some unknown way, he jumped into his own high-powered automobile" and was driven away by his chauffeur."
- The U.S. House of Representatives approved the Senate peace resolution, 228 to 139, in order to get President Wilson to deliver an expected veto
- Died: Eleanor H. Porter, 51, American novelist and children's author known for the 1913 classic Pollyanna and its sequel (b. 1868)

== May 22, 1920 (Saturday) ==
- The Civil Service Retirement Act went into effect for all United States government employees, and would serve as a model for future government-mandated plans for American retirement systems funded by mandatory payroll deductions.
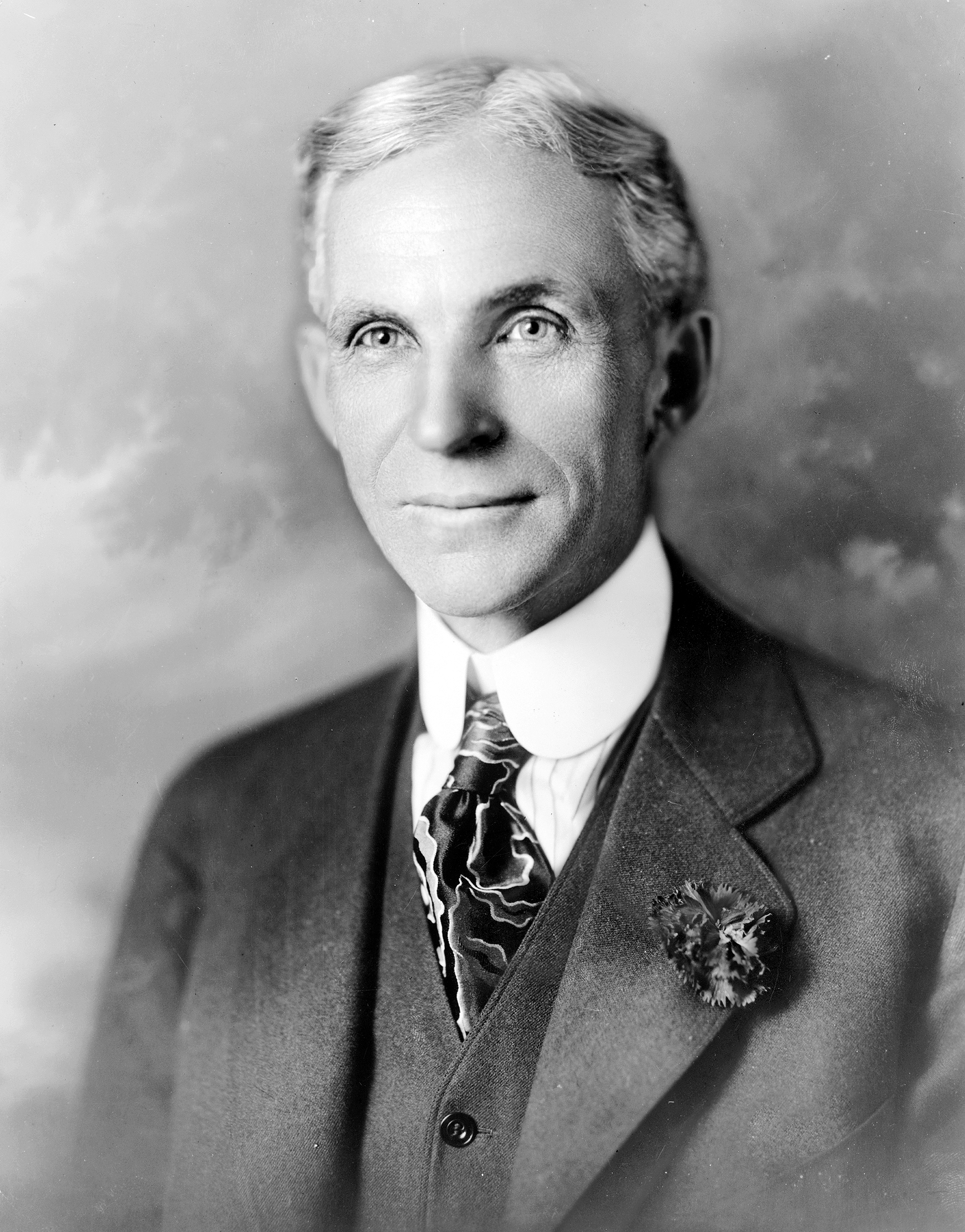
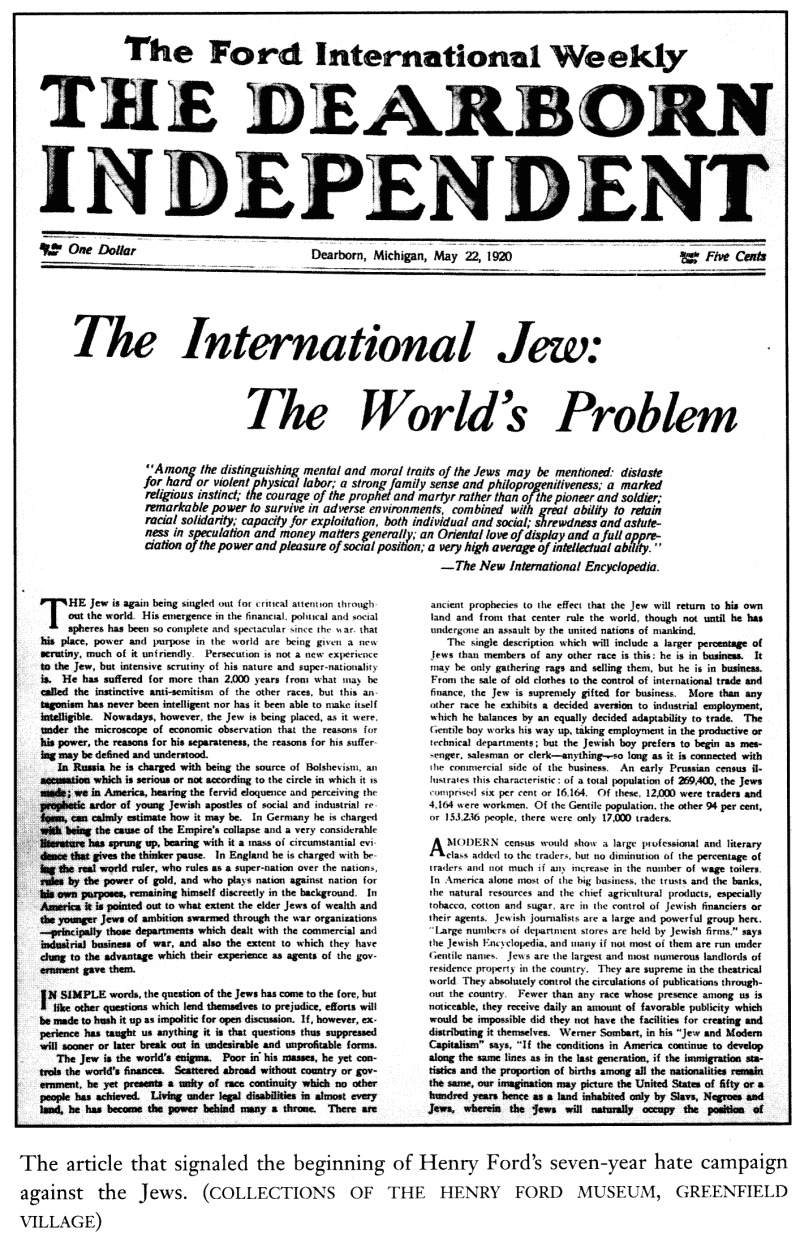
Henry Ford and his anti-Semitic newspaper
- The Dearborn Independent, a weekly newspaper published by auto manufacturer Henry Ford and distributed through the auto dealerships, printed the first of 91 anti-Semitic editorials reflecting Ford's disdain for Jews. The front page of the May 22 issue carried the article "The International Jew: The World's Problem." Most of the articles were excerpts from the book The Protocols of the Elders of Zion, that were "rewritten and 'Americanized' for a U.S. audience." Twenty consecutive articles had been published by October 2 and were gathered into a book by Ford at the end of the year. The filing of a lawsuit for libel and a boycott of Ford Motor Company products would finally bring a halt to The Dearborn Independent at the end of 1927.
- Born: Helen Andelin, American feminist, founder of the Fascinating Womanhood Movement; in Mesa, Arizona (d. 2009)

== May 23, 1920 (Sunday) ==
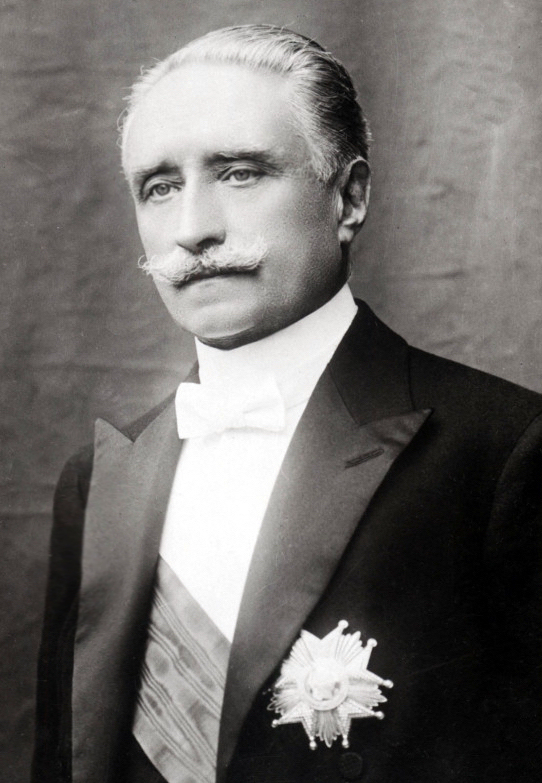
President Deschanel

- Paul Deschanel, the President of France, survived a bizarre accident when he fell out the window of the railroad car that was taking him from Paris to Montbrison for an official visit. The presidential train had passed Montargis in the Loiret department when the president was awakened by a draft from an open window beside his bed. Deschanel fell out, but the train had slowed to half of its normal speed of 75 kilometres per hour (47 mph) as it approached a branch line, and he was fortunate enough to tumble onto a sandy roadbed, to which "the President undoubtedly owed his escape from death." Walking 2½ kilometers (1½ miles) toward the town of Lorcy, the pajama-clad president encountered the trackwalker employed by the PLM railway, a Messr. Lotty, who did not believe him but walked with him to town. The disappearance of Deschanel (whose injuries were limited to a head laceration and a bruised leg) was not realized by his advisers on the train until the next morning. Deschanel's increasingly erratic behavior afterward would lead to his resignation on September 21.
- The Communist Union of the Indies (Perserikatan Komunis di Hindia, or PKH), the first communist party in Asia, was founded at Semarang in the Dutch East Indies colony (now Indonesia). After being suppressed by Dutch authorities in 1927, the party would re-emerge when the Republic of Indonesia was founded. The Communist Party of Indonesia (Partai Komunis Indonesia or PKI) would be re-established in 1945 but has been banned in Indonesia since 1966.
- A bounty of 100,000 Mexican pesos (equivalent to $50,000 U.S. dollars) for the death or capture of bandit leader Pancho Villa was announced by Governor Tomas Gameros of the state of Chihuahua
- Born: Helen O'Connell, American big-band singer, known for "Tangerine" and other hits; in Lima, Ohio (d. 1993)
- Died: Svetozar Boroević, 63, Croatian general of the Austro-Hungarian Army during World War I (b. 1856)

== May 24, 1920 (Monday) ==
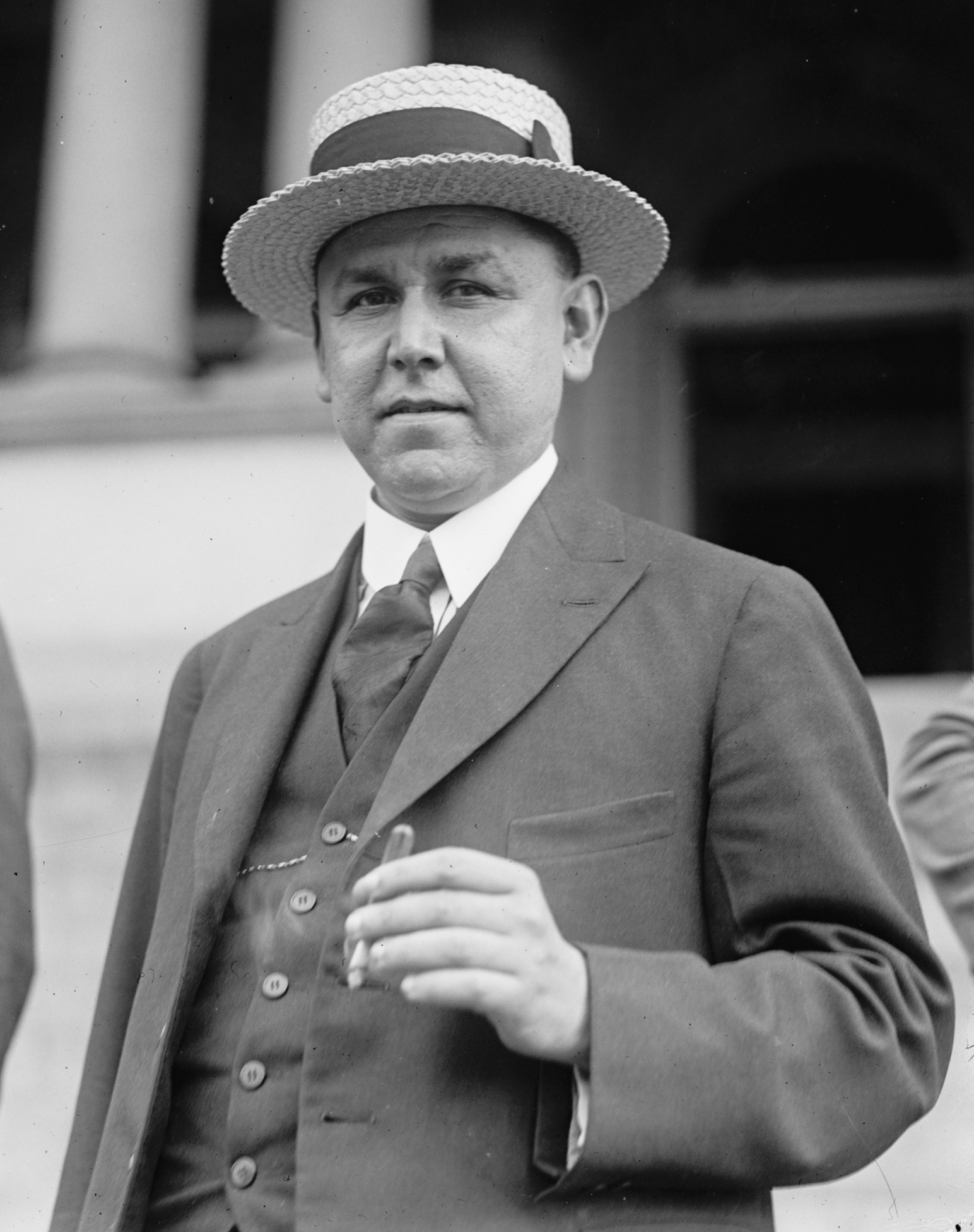
Huerta

- Adolfo de la Huerta, the Governor of Sonora whose secession started the recent revolution, was selected as the provisional President of Mexico by the national congress. With 252 members of the Mexican Congress obeying General Obregón's order to be present or to lose their offices, balloting lasted for 90 minutes until Huerta received the necessary two-thirds majority. The final vote was 224 for Huerta, and 28 for Pablo González. On the same day, Venustiano Carranza was buried in Mexico City three days after he had been executed. When the train bearing Carranza's body arrived at the capital, 14 of the aides who had fled with him were arrested and lodged in a military prison.
- Governor Alfred E. Smith of New York signed the "Walker Law", which revolutionized the sport of professional boxing by establishing weight divisions, creating a regulatory commission for enforcement, and setting limits of 15 rounds for bouts. State senator and future New York City Mayor Jimmy Walker had sponsored the legislation, which serve as a model for other U.S. states, as an effort to make money in promotion of the sport. In signing the legislation, Governor Smith commented, "The stress of the times demands healthy and wholesome amusement for the men of the state, and when an amusement can be afforded under such rigid restrictions and control as this bill provides, no possible harm and, on the other hand, a great amount of good can and will result from this enactment."
- U.S. President Wilson urged Congress to approve American administration of Armenia under a League of Nations Mandate, a plan which the U.S. Senate rejected eight days later by a 52 to 23 vote.

== May 25, 1920 (Tuesday) ==
- The final presidential primary election of the 1920 U.S. presidential campaign was held, as Republican West Virginia voters favored their U.S. Senator, Howard Sutherland. With only two weeks left until the start of the Republican National Convention, General Leonard Wood was the front runner, with 151 of the 984 delegates, and U.S. Senator Hiram Johnson of California was second with 110. Governor Frank Lowden of Illinois had 75 and U.S. Senator Warren G. Harding of Ohio had his state's 39. The vast majority of delegates (595) remained uninstructed and were to be awarded in state conventions in the week before the convention opener. Two thirds, or 656 delegates, were needed to captured the nomination
- Born: Arthur Wint, Jamaican athlete, first Olympic gold medalist to represent Jamaica, winner of the 400 meter dash in 1948; in Plowden, Manchester Parish (d. 1992)

== May 26, 1920 (Wednesday) ==
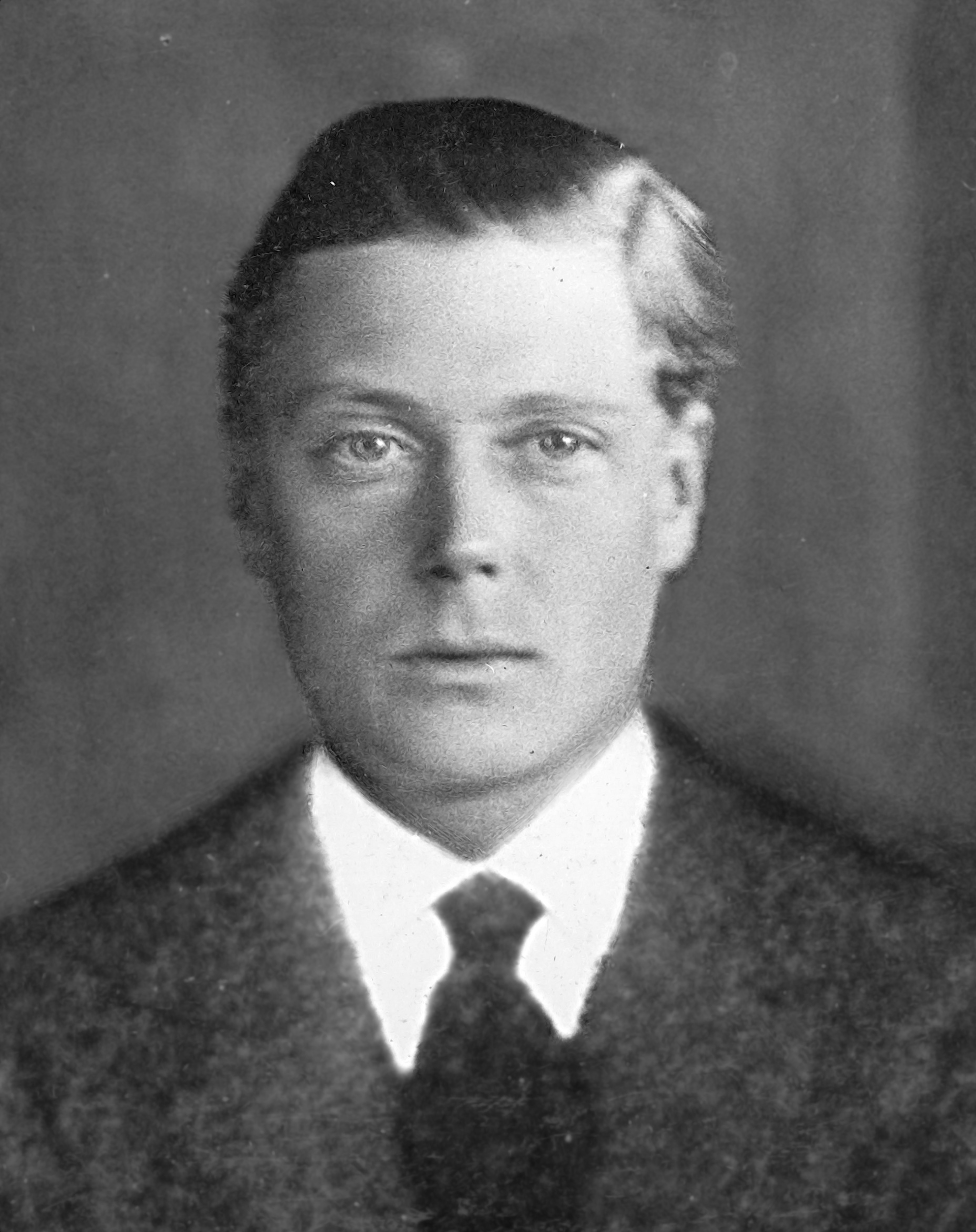
Prince Edward

- Edward, Prince of Wales, heir to the British throne and the future King Edward VIII, arrived in Australia for a goodwill tour to convey the thanks of King George V to the Commonwealth for its service during the Great War. Because of heavy fog that had rolled into The Rip, the entrance to Melbourne's Port Phillip Bay, the prince was not able to enter on the Royal Navy battle cruiser HMS Renown. A crowd of 750,000 waited for hours until HMAS Anzac, recently put into the service of the Royal Australian Navy, took the prince and the rest of the royal party on board. Prince Edward finally set foot on Australian ground at 3:50 in the afternoon, at the pier at St Kilda.
- Mexican Army General Rodolfo Herrero, who had carried out the murder of former President Carranza in violation of the orders of President Obregon, surrendered at Coyutla in the Veracruz state and was taken to Mexico City for questioning.
- Born:
  - Peggy Lee (stage name for Norma Egstrom), American pop music singer, songwriter, and Grammy Award winner; in Jamestown, North Dakota, United States (d. 2002)
  - John Dall (stage name for as John Dall Thompson) American stage and film actor; in New York City(d. 1971)

== May 27, 1920 (Thursday) ==
- U.S. President Wilson vetoed the Knox Peace Resolution, which had declared a state of peace to exist between the U.S. and the former empires of Germany and Austria-Hungary. "The resolution seeks to establish peace with the German Empire," President Wilson wrote, "without exacting from the German Government any action by way of setting right the infinite wrongs which it did to the peoples whom it attacked... Have we sacrificed the lives of more than 100,000 Americans and ruined the lives of thousands of others and brought upon thousands of American families an unhappiness that can never end for purposes which we do not now care to state or take further steps to attain?"
- With a capital at Kazan, the Tatar Autonomous Soviet Socialist Republic was established within the Russian SFSR, granting limited self rule for about 1,500,000 of 4.2 million Tatars who lived in Russia. The Republic of Tatarstan continues to exist as a federal subject of the Russian Federation.
- President Wilson commuted the death sentence of captured German spy Lothar Witzke, who had been convicted of espionage after his capture in 1918, to life imprisonment. Witzke would later be pardoned (on September 26, 1923) by U.S. President Calvin Coolidge.

== May 28, 1920 (Friday) ==
- With a margin of only 219 to 152, the House failed to obtain the two-thirds majority to override President Wilson's veto of the Knox peace resolution.
- Troops from Greece began the occupation of Bulgarian Thrace, a part of the disbanded Ottoman Empire that had been claimed also by the Kingdom of Bulgaria.
- Born: Gene Levitt, American TV producer, creator of Fantasy Island; in Brooklyn, New York City (d. 1999)

== May 29, 1920 (Saturday) ==
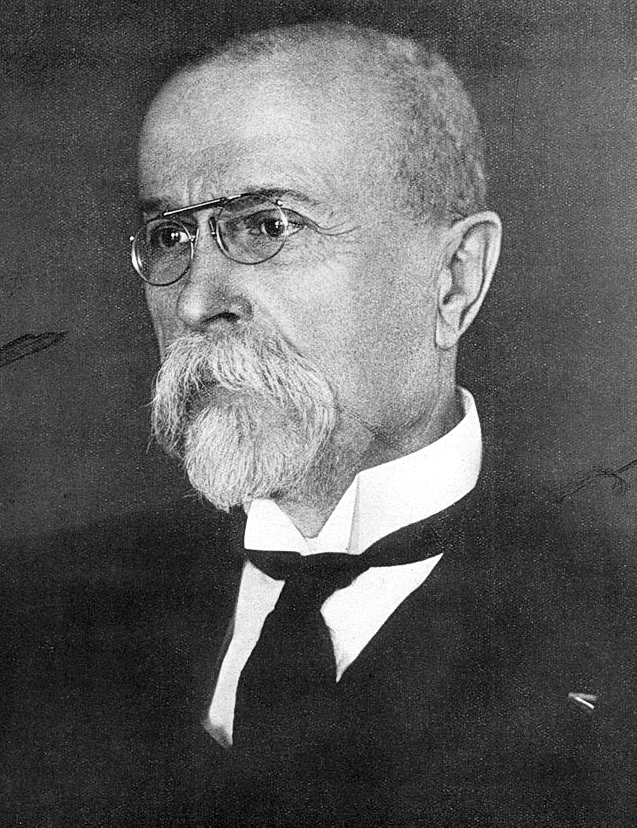
Masaryk

- Tomáš Masaryk, who had been serving as the provisional president of Czechoslovakia since its formation in 1918, was formally approved as President of Czechoslovakia at the opening of the first elected Parliament of the Czechoslovak Republic. Masaryk received 284 votes, to 61 for a German minority candidate, Senator August Naegle.
- The Senate investigation of pre-convention campaign expenditures determined that General Leonard Wood had spent the most money of all candidates, with $1,180,043 to secure the Republican nomination. Governor Frank Lowden was second, having spent $414,984.
- The first worldwide sports broadcast was made as the U.S. Navy transmitted updates of the year's "Army-Navy baseball game" by wireless radio to U.S. Army and U.S. Navy bases around the globe, and to ships at sea. The game was played at Annapolis, Maryland, between the host United States Naval Academy and the United States Military Academy of West Point and the play-by-play was transmitted to the U.S. Department of War offices in Washington, D.C.; approved summaries were then relayed to the Naval Communications Office in Annapolis, which in turn relayed them to San Diego for transmission to 'the island possessions' (including the Philippines), to Alaska, China, and Siberia, and to ships in the Pacific. The results were relayed from the naval radio station at Sayville, New York, for transmission to "the West Indies and the Canal Zone, and all the ships flying the United States flag, from home waters to Constantinople and the Black Sea." The baseball game, never as popular as the Army-Navy football game, was unexciting, in that Navy took an 11 to 0 lead into the ninth inning, where Army scored its lone run.
- In England, flash floods killed 23 people in the Lincolnshire town of Louth.
- Born:
  - John Harsanyi, Hungarian-born American economist; in Budapest (d. 2000)
  - Clifton James, American film actor; as George Clifton James, in Spokane, Washington (d. 2017)

== May 30, 1920 (Sunday) ==
- The American Jewish Congress, which had organized in 1918 to lobby the League of Nations to protect the rights of Jews in the states created after the German, Austro-Hungarian and Ottoman Empires were dissolved, voted in Philadelphia to create a permanent organization that still exists today.
- Born:
  - James F. Leonard, American diplomat, U.S. Ambassador to the United Nations from 1977 to 1979; in Osborne, Pennsylvania (d. 2020)
  - Franklin J. Schaffner, American film director, 1970 Oscar winner for Patton; to American parents in Tokyo, Empire of Japan (d. 1989)
  - Godfrey Binaisa, President of Uganda from 1979 to 1980; in Kampala, Protectorate of Uganda (d. 2010)
  - Frederick M. Nicholas, American real estate developer; in Brooklyn, New York City (d. 2025)
  - Shōtarō Yasuoka, Japanese novelist; in Kōchi Prefecture (d. 2013)
- Died: G. E. Morrison, 58, Australian journalist and political adviser to Chinese president Yuan Shikai (b. 1862)

== May 31, 1920 (Monday) ==
- S.S. Selma, the largest of only 12 concrete ships built for the United States during World War I, was cracked beyond repair after it struck a jetty outside of the harbor of Tampico in Mexico, leaving a 60 feet (18 m) gash. Because the experimental concrete ship program had been discontinued when the war closed, no technology had been developed to repair a concrete ship. The useless hull of the Selma was towed to a site near Pelican Island off of the coast of Texas and scuttled on March 9, 1922.
