= Keep Your Head Down, Fritzie Boy =

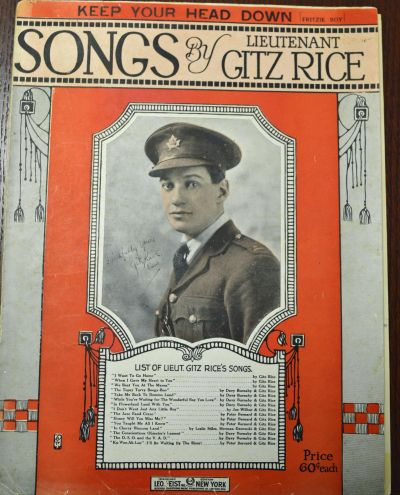
- Sheet Music cover

Song
- Language: English
- Published: 1918
- Songwriter(s): Gitz Rice

"Keep Your Head Down, Fritzie Boy" is a World War I song written and composed by Gitz Rice. This song was published in 1918 by Leo. Feist, Inc., in New York, NY. The cover features a photo of Gitz Rice and reads "inspired by a brave Tommy and written at the Battle of Ypres, 1915."

The song was in the top 20 charts from July to October 1918 and reached number 11 in August. It was recorded by both the American Quartet and Arthur Fields.

The sheet music can be found at the Pritzker Military Museum & Library.
