= St. Boswells (tugboat) =

British tugboat sunk by a mine

History

United Kingdom
- Name: St. Boswells
- Namesake: St Boswells
- Owner: Admiralty
- Port of registry: London
- Builder: John Cran & Somerville, Leith
- Yard number: 116
- Launched: 1919
- Completed: October 1919
- Identification: UK official number 143450; code letters KCRD
- Fate: Sunk by mine, 1920

General characteristics
- Class & type: Saint-class Admiralty tug
- Tonnage: 463 GRT
- Length: 135.4 ft (41.3 m)
- Beam: 29.0 ft (8.8 m)
- Depth: 13.6 ft (4.1 m)
- Decks: 1
- Installed power: 107 NHP
- Propulsion: 1 × triple-expansion engine; 1 × screw
- Speed: 12.5 knots (23 km/h)
- Crew: 22

St. Boswells was a Saint-class Admiralty tug that was built in Scotland in 1919 and sunk by a mine in the North Sea in 1920 with the loss of 16 of her crew. The United Kingdom Admiralty owned her, but she was registered as a merchant ship, and had a civilian merchant crew.

== Building and registration ==
During the First World War the Admiralty ordered 64 Saint-class ocean-going tugs. The number was reduced to 46 because of the end of the war. John Cran & Somerville Ltd in Leith on the Firth of Forth built St. Boswells as yard number 116, and completed her in October 1919.

St. Boswells' registered length was 135.4 ft (41.3 m); her beam was 29.0 ft (8.8 m); her depth was 13.6 ft (4.1 m); and she was assessed as 463 GRT. She had a single screw, driven by a three-cylinder triple-expansion engine that was rated at 107 NHP, and gave her a speed of 12.5 knots (23 km/h). The Admiralty registered her in London. Her UK official number was 143450 and her code letters were KCRD.

== Santa Theresa ==
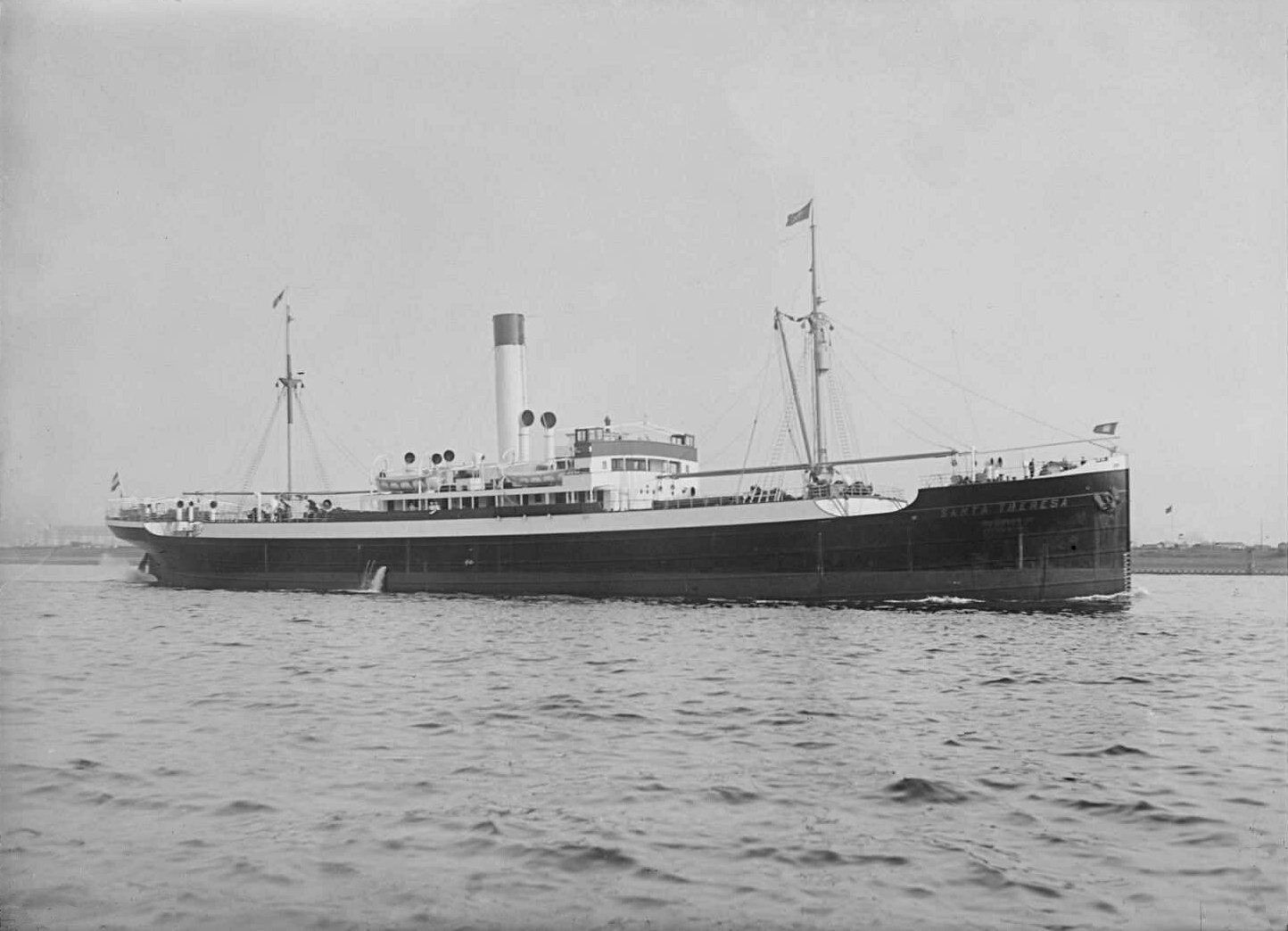
Hamburg Süd's Santa Theresa

Santa Theresa was a 3,739 GRT Hamburg Südamerikanische cargo ship. She spent the First World War sheltering in Iquique in Chile. On 26 September 1918 the Chilean government seized her, but found that her crew had sabotaged her machinery. In 1919 Hamburg Süd surrendered its fleet to the Entente Powers under Article 231 of the Treaty of Versailles. However, Santa Theresa was unable to put to sea under her own power, so she was towed back to Europe to be transferred to the UK Shipping Controller. She was laden with a full cargo of potassium nitrate from Iquique.

== Loss and rescue ==
St. Boswells was towing Santa Theresa on the final leg of her voyage to Hamburg. At about 06:30 hrs on 10 June 1920 St. Boswells struck a mine about 10 miles (16 km) north of the Brandaris on Terschelling. She sank within two minutes, and 16 of her crew were killed, including her Captain; Second Officer; Second Engineer; Third Engineer; six stokers and two greasers.

Santa Theresa broadcast a distress signal, lowered a lifeboat, and rescued six survivors, one of whom was injured. The tugboats Stortemelk II, followed by Texel and Wodan went to her. The Dutch lifeboat Brandaris tried to reach her, but could not get further than the Schuitengat due to engine damage. After a salvage contract had been made with Rederij Doeksen, Stortemelk II and Texel towed Santa Theresa to the Nieuwediep. Santa Theresa was towed into Hamburg on 27 June.

== Wreck ==
On 14 September 1991 a team of divers dived to St. Boswells' wreck. There was little left of the ship. The stern was still there with the fallen triple expansion steam engine and thirteen-foot (4 m) bronze propeller. In 2010 the Friendship shipping company tried to salvage the propeller, but was unsuccessful.

== Bibliography ==
- Cooper, James; Kludas, Arnold; Pein, Joachim (1989). The Hamburg South America Line. Kendal: World Ship Society. ISBN 0-905617-50-9.
- Lloyd's Register of Shipping. Vol. II.–Steamers. London: Lloyd's Register of Shipping. 1919 – via Internet Archive.
- Mercantile Navy List. London. 1920 – via Crew List Index Project.
