= Dear Old Pal of Mine =

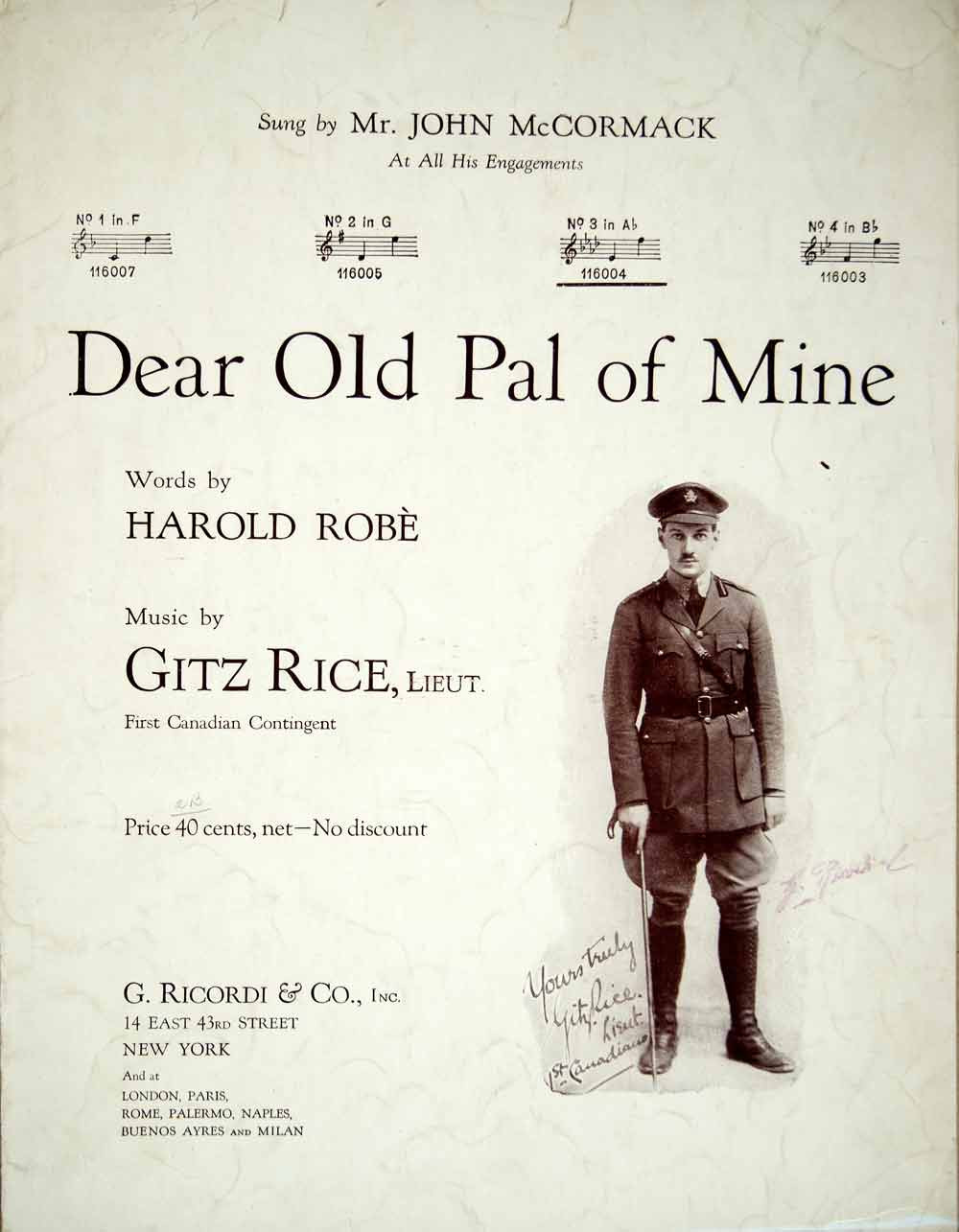
- Sheet Music cover

Song
- Language: English
- Published: 1916
- Songwriters: Harold Robe; Gitz Rice

"Dear Old Pal of Mine" is a World War I song written by Harold Robe and Gitz Rice. The song was first published in 1916 by G. Ricordi & Co. in New York, NY.

Irish tenor John McCormack earned the nickname the "Singing Prophet of Victory" by popularizing this wartime song. It was in the top 20 from January to March 1919 and reached number 10 in February.

The idea for the song, according to an editorial note on the sheet music, was conceived by Rice while on sentry duty at the front lines at Ypres, Belgium.
