= Jeanne Tomasini =

French author (1920–2022)

- Born: Jeanne Lucienne Maestracci; 25 June 1920; Porticciolo, Corsica, France
- Died: 19 April 2022 (aged 101); La Garde, Var, France
- Occupation: Author
- Writing career
- Genre: Historical novels

Jeanne Lucienne Tomasini (née Maestracci, 25 June 1920 – 19 April 2022) was a French writer of historical novels.

== Life and career ==
Jeanne Tomasini started to write at the age of 80 as a leisure activity. Most of her novels are inspired by her Corsican origins and full of vivid fictional portrayals of her characters and settings.

Tomasini died in La Garde, Var on 19 April 2022, at the age of 101.

== Bibliography ==
- Les Obstinés (French Edition), Paris, Little Big Man, 2004
- Don Paolo (French Edition), Paris, Little Big Man, 2005
- Le Persan (French Edition), Paris, Little Big Man, 2006
- Ascanio Mio (French Edition), Paris, Little Big Man, 2008
- Retour à Polveroso (French Edition), Paris, Little Big Man, 2007
- Opération rouge Baiser (French Edition), Paris, GdP, 2009
- A Monticello (French Edition), Paris, GdP, 2010
- Les enfants de l'abîme (French Edition), Paris, GdP, 2010
- Engrenage fatal (French Edition, Paris, GdP
- L´agent....0069 á l´lle du Levant (French Edition), 2012
