= Gitz Rice =

Canadian military entertainer (1891–1947)

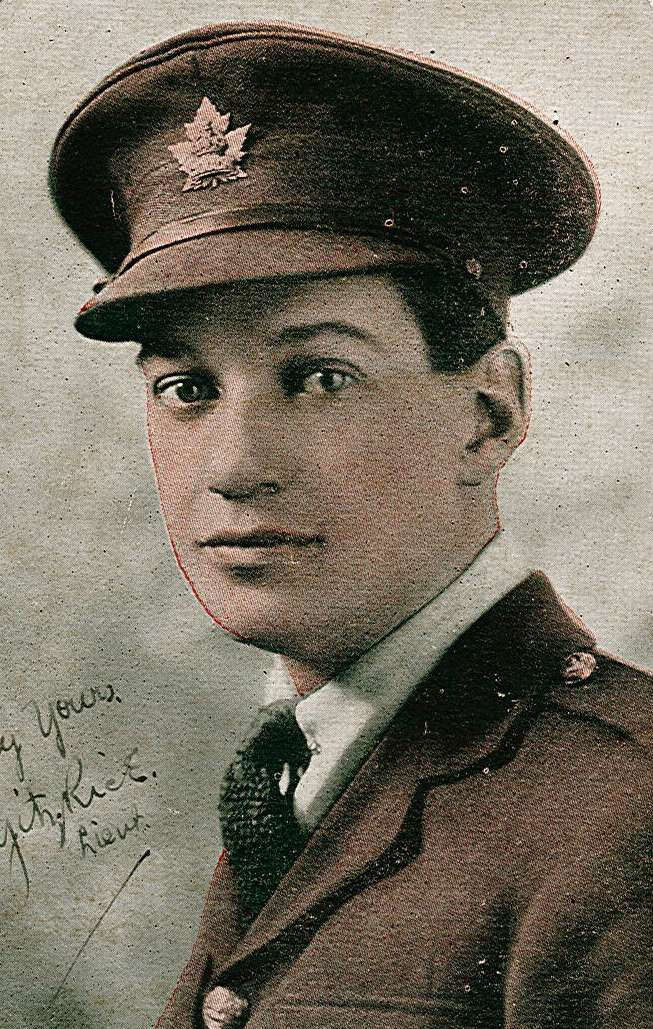
- Born: May 5, 1891; New Glasgow, Nova Scotia, Canada
- Died: October 16, 1947 (aged 56)
- Spouse: Ruby Hoffman
- Relatives: George W. Rice, first cousin
- Military career
- Born: Ingraham Rice
- Allegiance: Canada/United Kingdom
- Branch: Canadian Expeditionary Force
- Rank: Lieutenant
- Nickname: Gitz
- Units: 5th Battery, 2nd Brigade, Canadian Field Artillery
- Conflicts: Ypres, the Somme and Vimy Ridge
- Musical career
- Genre: War songs
- Occupations: Performer, composer
- Instrument: Piano

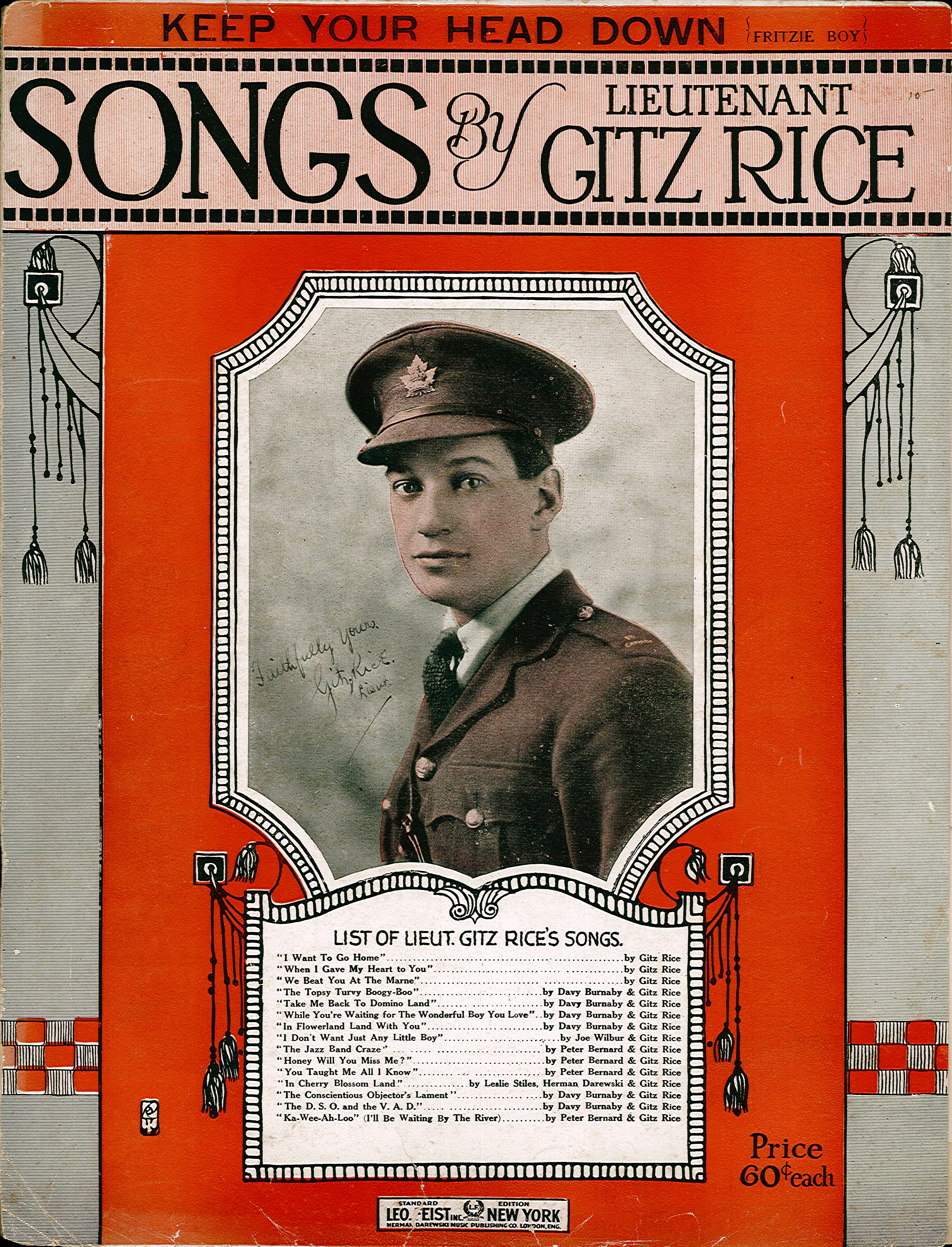
Collection of Gitz Rice songs

Lieutenant Gitz Rice (born Ingraham Rice; March 5, 1891 – October 16, 1947) was a Canadian service member and entertainer, best known for creating various World War I war songs popular among both troops and civilians.

== Early life ==
Ingraham "Gitz" Rice was born in 1891 in New Glasgow, Nova Scotia to Amos Ingraham Rice and Eliza G Rice. His father, Amos, was a photographer who developed his craft in Nova Scotia but transferred his business to Montreal in 1892 when the Gitz was young. He earned the nickname "Gitz" from his eldest brother Charles, due to his odd walking style during his earliest years. Gitz Rice was a direct patrilineal descendant of Edmund Rice, an early immigrant to Massachusetts Bay Colony from England. (Note: The descendancy of Gitz Rice from Edmund Rice is as follows: Edmund Rice (1594-1663); Thomas Rice (1626-1681); Thomas Rice (1654-1747); Beriah Rice (1702-1764); Beriah Rice, Jr. (1741-c1818); Robert Muckford Rice (1805-1892); Amos Ingraham Rice (c1850-?); Ingraham Rice (1891-1947).) His first cousin George W. Rice was a notable Arctic explorer.

Rice studied piano during his childhood. He attended Victoria School, Montreal High School, the Feller Institute, and French Protestant School at Grande Ligne, Quebec before enrolling in the McGill Conservatory in Montreal, where he was influenced by music professor Eddy Upton.

== Military career ==
Rice enlisted in the army on the exact day Britain declared war on Germany in 1914, beginning as a gunnery officer. He began writing songs during training, mostly jokingly musing on the training procedures. Once deployed, he fought in various battles across Europe. He first wrote about trench life in 1915, at the battle of Neuve Chapelle. Rice organized the first World War I concert party for servicemen in France.

Rice joined Princess Patricia's Canadian Light Infantry Comedy Company as a piano player from time to time. In an interview with the New York Times, Rice cites one of his clearest war memories as a time when he saved a piano from destruction:

I shall never forget, in one town, stealing a piano out of an old house that was being shelled. The piano would have been destroyed anyhow. We got a wagon, put the piano on the wagon, and drove down a road where thousands of infantry boys were lined along the sides. I couldn't keep my fingers from the keys, and started to play as we went along. There were shouts, cheers, and singing, and one English soldier came up to me in all seriousness and said: 'What is the idea of the celebration? Has peace been declared?' Of course, I had to answer the negative.

Following the Battle of Somme, Rice created a committee to develop concerts to entertain soldiers. He was removed from combat upon being gassed at Vimy Ridge in 1917, and returned to Canada. There he became lieutenant of musical entertainment for soldiers, overseeing the entertainment of approximately 70,000 troops per week.

== Life after service ==
Having developed a reputation for writing numerous popular war songs, Rice moved to New York City in 1919 to pursue an entertainment career further. He began as a piano accompaniment player, and continued to write. Much of his work was based around emulating his war time experiences and performances, and he often appeared on stage in uniform. He went on to create the successful vaudeville act "Gitzy Rice and His North West Mounted Police," which featured performers in Royal Canadian Mounties uniforms. He wrote multiple musicals, although none matched the success of his other work.

Rice stopped performing in 1930 in order to enter a public relations career, though he returned to the stage to entertain Canadian troops during World War II.

== Personal life ==
Rice married silent film actress Ruby Hoffman in 1918.

He died in October 1947 after facing bronchial asthma for a number of months.

== Notable works ==
- "Dear Old Pal of Mine"
- "Keep Your Head Down, Fritzie Boy"
- "Mademoiselle from Armentières"
- "On the Road That Leads to Home"
