= Army and Air Force Motion Picture Service =

Army and Air Force Motion Picture Service (AAFMPS)
- Active: 1920-1975
- Disbanded: Merged with Army and Air Force Exchange Service
- Branch: United States Army, United States Air Force
- Type: Morale support
- Role: Entertainment, Movie theaters
- Size: Approximately 2,950 (at time of merger in 1975)
- Garrison/HQ: Dallas, Texas, United States

The Army and Air Force Motion Picture Service is a defunct organization that operated movie theaters on US Army and Air Force installations from 1920 until 1975. Before World War I, licensing rights to show motion pictures were the responsibility of individual installation commanders.

== History ==
The Army Motion Picture Service (AMPS) was established on 22 June 1920, under the US War Department as a centralized entity to regulate admissions and film licenses among Army movie theaters, followed by the establishment of the Army Library Service in 1923. In 1941, the AMPS was transferred to the command of the Army Special Services, operating 94 theaters at that time.

== Redesignation ==
In 1948, after the separation of Air Force as a distinct branch, the Army Motion Picture Service was redesignated the Army and Air Force Motion Picture Service.

== Merger with AAFES ==
The AAFMPS was merged with the Army and Air Force Exchange Service on 28 June 1975, and its functions are now part of the U.S. Army Family and Morale, Welfare and Recreation; the G9 Division of the U.S. Army Installation Management Command (for the U.S. Army) and the Air Force Services Agency (for the U.S. Air Force).
