= July 1920 =

Month in 1920

<<	July 1920					>>
Su	Mo	Tu	We	Th	Fr	Sa
				1	2	3
4	5	6	7	8	9	10
11	12	13	14	15	16	17
18	19	20	21	22	23	24
25	26	27	28	29	30	31

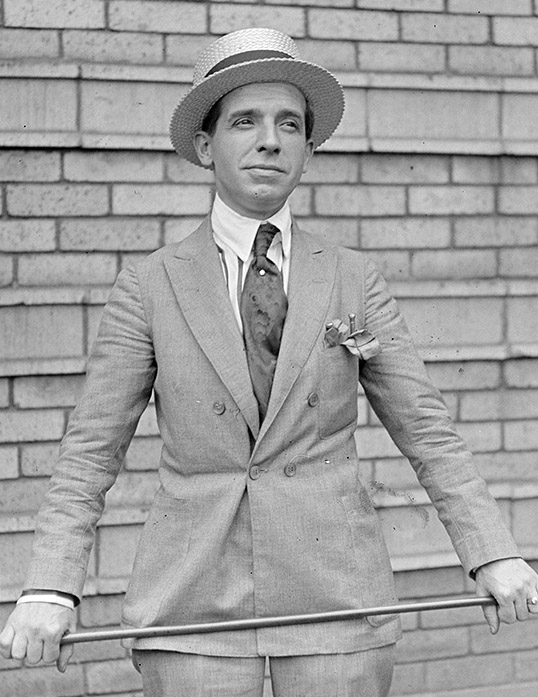
July 26, 1920: Charles Ponzi scheme exposed by The Boston Post

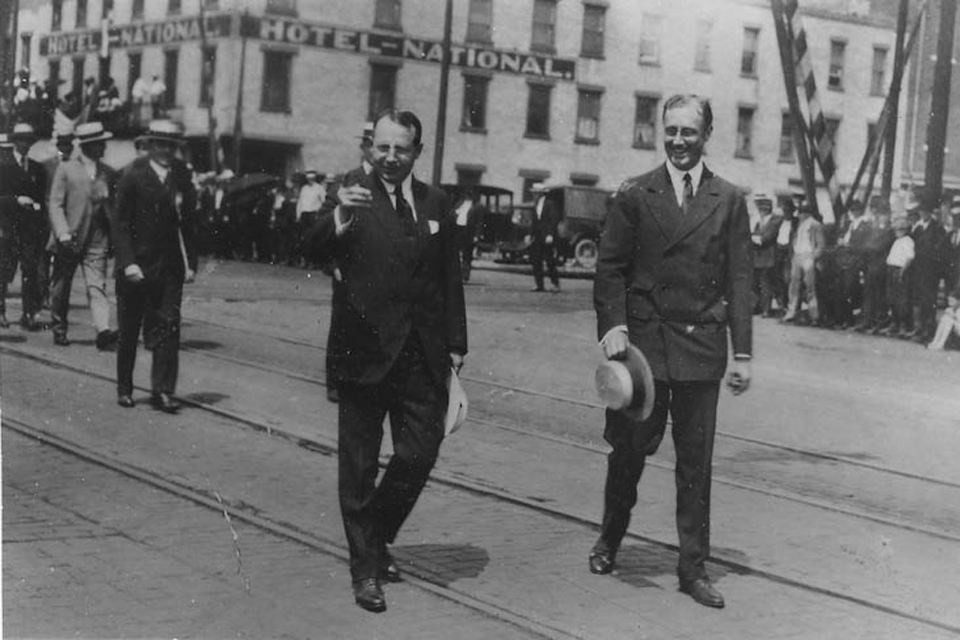
July 5, 1920: Ohio Governor James M. Cox nominated as Democratic presidential candidate after 44 ballots, selects Assistant U.S. Navy Secretary Franklin Roosevelt as running mate

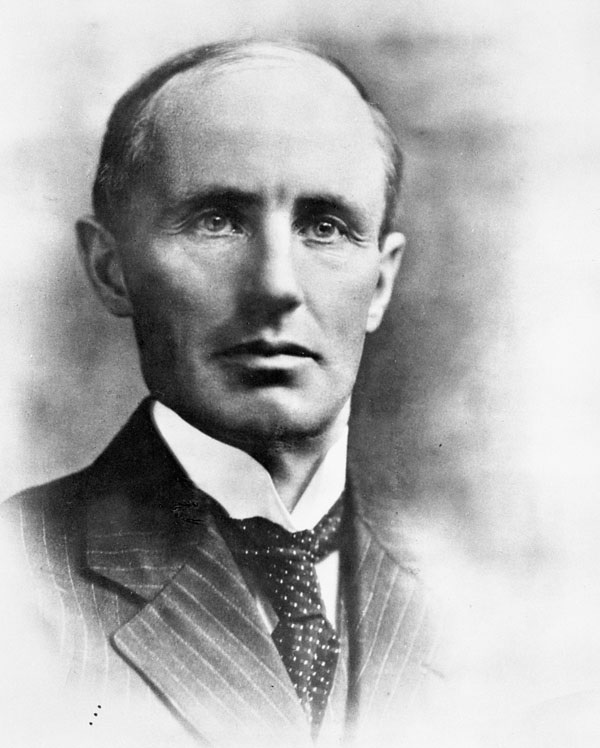
July 10, 1920: Arthur Meighen becomes new Prime Minister of Canada

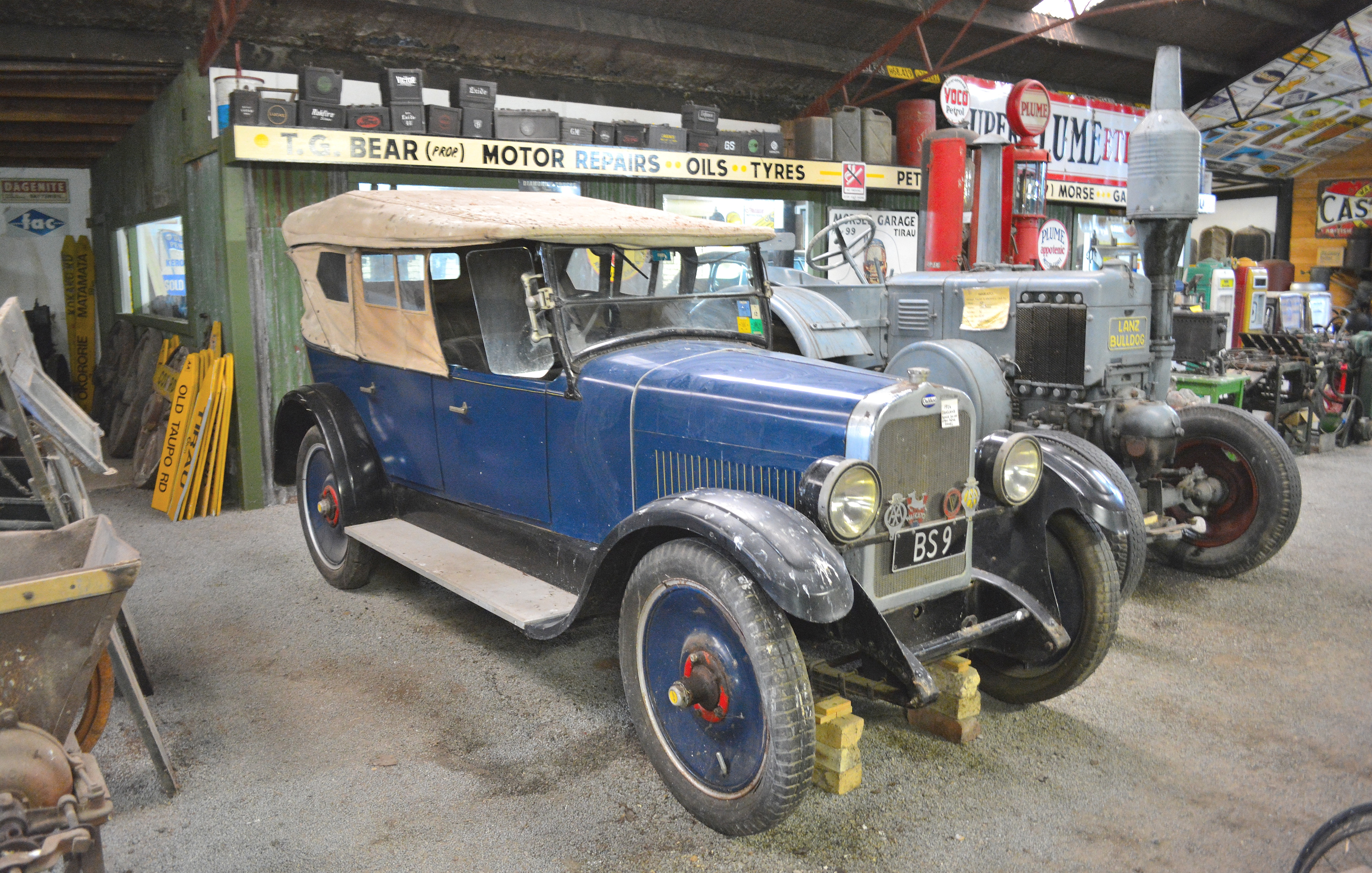
July 4, 1920: DuPont chemist's accidental discovery of Duco process opens the era of colorful mass-produced automobiles (pictured: a 1924 "True Blue" Oakland Tourer, first model lacquered with Duco paint)

== July 1, 1920 (Thursday) ==
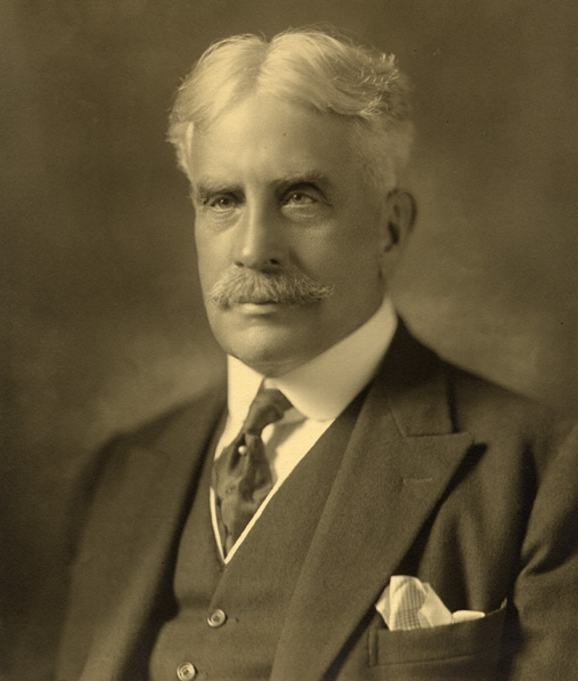
Borden

- Sir Robert Borden announced that he was resigning after nine years of service as prime minister of Canada, because of poor health. Borden made his announcement at a meeting in Ottawa of his Unionist Party colleagues.
- The former German town of Walk was divided by an arbitration commission between Estonia (where most of the area, including the railway station, became the town of Valga) and Latvia (where the southern suburbs part became Valka).
- Born:
  - George I. Fujimoto, American chemist who discovered the Fujimoto–Belleau reaction; in Seattle (d. 2023)
  - Aziz Sedky, Prime minister of Egypt from 1972 to 1973, developer of Egypt's industrialization during the rule of President Nasser; in Cairo(d. 2008)
- Died: Delfim Moreira, 51, Brazilian politician, President of Brazil from 1918 to 1919 (b. 1868)

== July 2, 1920 (Friday) ==
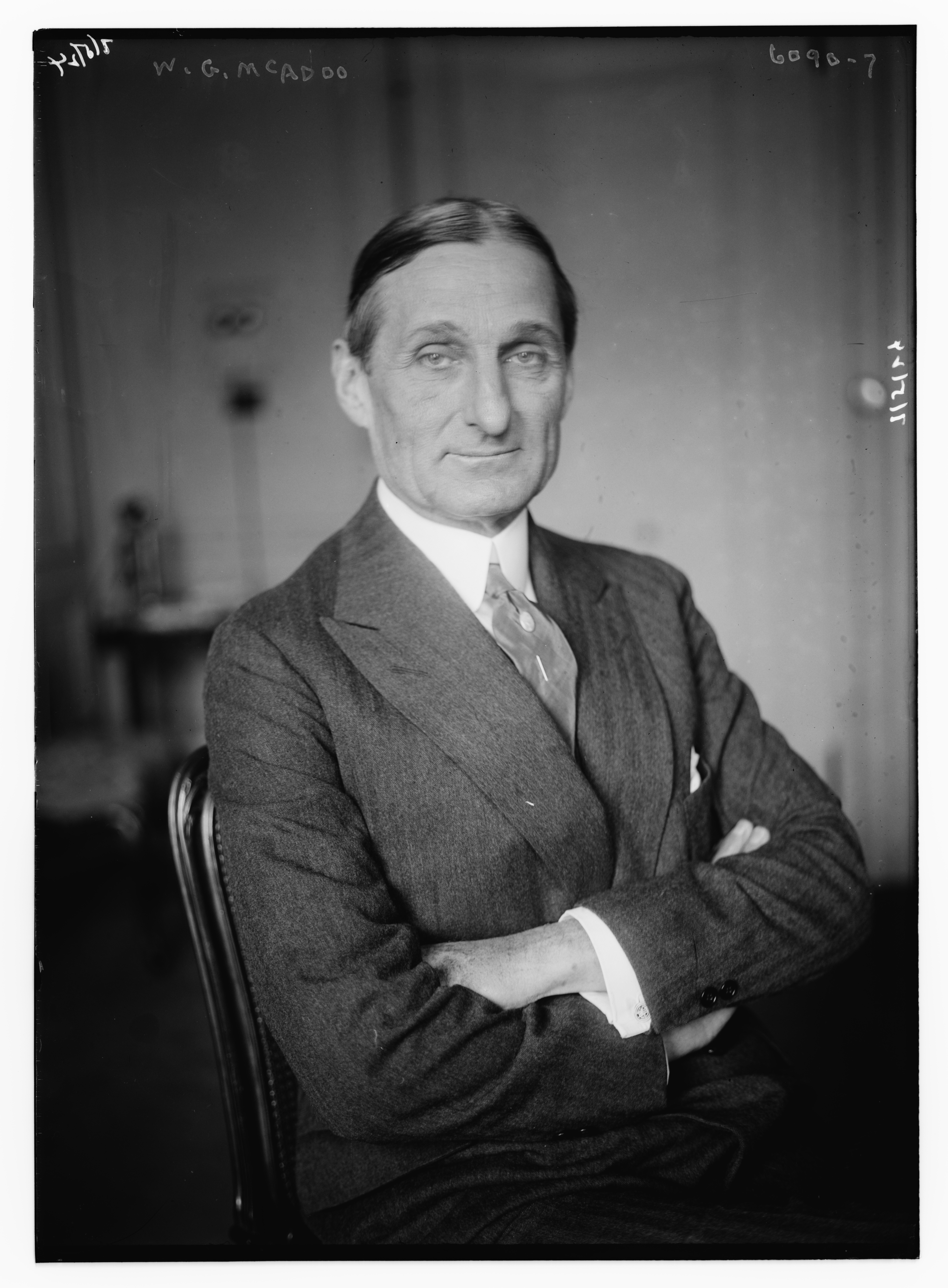
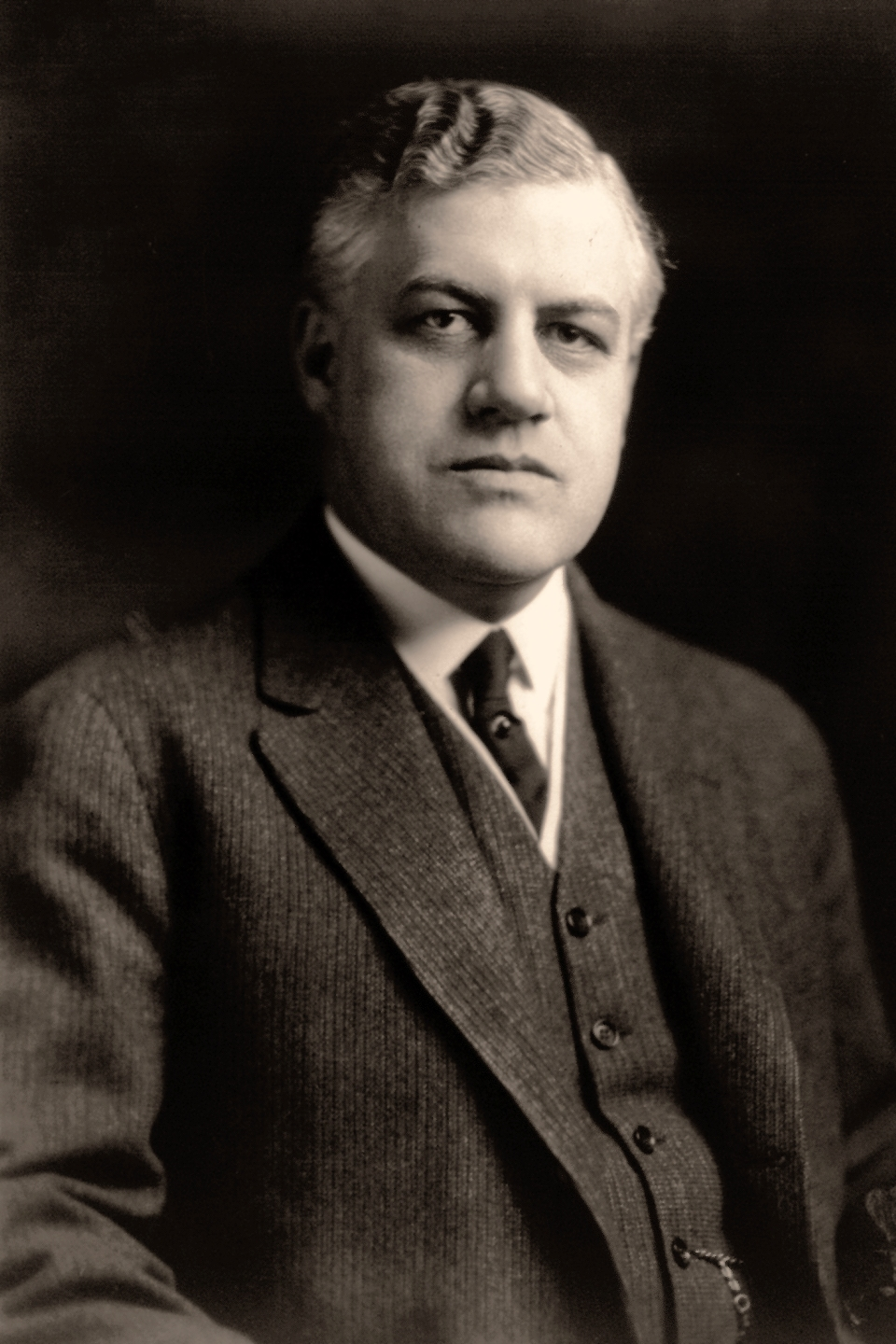
Secretary McAdoo vs. Attorney General Palmer
- Delegate voting for the presidential nomination began at the 1920 Democratic National Convention at San Francisco. With a two-thirds majority (or 729½ of the 1102 delegate votes) necessary for a nomination, former Treasury Secretary William Gibbs McAdoo, had 266 votes on the first ballot, followed by Attorney General A. Mitchell Palmer with 256, Ohio Governor James M. Cox with 134 and New York Governor Al Smith with 109. The other votes were split among 19 other candidates. The convention adjourned for the day after the second roll call, with McAdoo still in first place.
- Sir Herbert Samuel arrived in Jaffa to begin his duties as the first British High Commissioner for Palestine, placed under mandate by the Allied Powers.
- The Soviet Army and Ukrainian Bolsheviks captured the former Austro-Hungarian town of Lemberg, occupied at the time by Poland (which had named in Lwow), driving out Polish and Ukrainian forces. For decades, it was part of the Ukrainian SSR as Lvov, and is now the Ukrainian city of Lviv.
- Died: General William L. Marshall, 74, Chief of the U.S. Army Corps of Engineers from 1908 to 1910 (b. 1846)

== July 3, 1920 (Saturday) ==
- Germany's Chancellor Constantin Fehrenbach and his new coalition government received a vote of confidence in the Reichstag by a margin of 313 to 64.
- Meeting at Brussels, the Allied Conference agreed upon a division of the reparation payments that would be expected from Germany, with the initial 8 percent being allocated to Belgium; 52% to France, 22% to the United Kingdom, 5 1/2 % to Serbia and 4% apiece to Italy, Japan and Portugal. The reparation was reportedly going to be based on a principal of 6,000,000,000 British pounds sterling, along with interest, payable in installments of £150,000,000 per year for the first five years, and £250,000,000 from 1926 onward.
- Sixteen more roll calls were taken in the Democratic National Convention. On the seventh ballot, Governor Cox gained 100 votes to surpass Attorney General Palmer, and, on the twelfth ballot, Cox passed Secretary McAdoo to become the front runner. Cox had 458 when the day adjourned after the eighteenth ballot, still short of the necessary 729½ votes, and McAdoo had 330½.
- A bolt of lightning led to 18 deaths and over 100 injuries in the wreck of three streetcars near Pittston, Pennsylvania. Most of those killed were sports fans returning to Scranton from the annual Caledonian Club games against Pittston. At 7:30 in the evening, the lightning struck and knocked down a telegraph pole adjacent to the Lackawanna and Wyoming Valley Railroad line, just as the lead streetcar was approaching. Moments later, the second streetcar crashed into the back of the first one, and then "a third car telescoped the second car."
- The collision of three Lackawanna and Wyoming Valley Railroad trains in Sebastopol, Pennsylvania in the U.S. killed 18 people and injured 30 others. Almost all the casualties were passengers on the Laurel Line Limited coach, which was "completely telescoped" when it was struck from behind by a fast-moving local train.
- Died: William C. Gorgas, 65, Surgeon General of the United States Army during World War I (b. 1854)

== July 4, 1920 (Sunday) ==
- A researcher at the DuPont chemical laboratories ("more by accident, I think, than by intention" General Motors CEO Alfred P. Sloan would note later), effected a chemical reaction "which led to the development of a nitrocellulose lacquer eventually called Duco." Because the lacquer base could carry more color pigment in suspension, the color of automobiles was no longer limited to black and, in 1923, GM's Oakland Motor Car Company would introduce the dark blue 1924 Oakland Tourer. While cars had been custom painted in other colors in the past (with a finish that would take a month to dry), the Duco Finish permitted the mass production of cars in other colors. The Duco Finish was described by the DuPont company as "a pyroxylin material made from chemically treated cotton, pigments and solvents" that "will practically revolutionize the enameling business" because it dried at room temperature in a few minutes, as well as being "tough, durable, adhesive, pleasing to the eye and touch."
- Born:
  - Anthony Barber, British politician, Chancellor of the Exchequer from 1970 to 1974; in Kingston upon Hull (d. 2005)
  - Leona Helmsley, American real estate financier, owner of the Helmsley Hotels chain; as Lena Rosenthal, in Marbletown, New York (d. 2007)

== July 5, 1920 (Monday) ==
- After 43 ballots for a presidential nominee, the U.S. Democratic Party nominated Ohio Governor James M. Cox. In the 30th round of voting, Secretary McAdoo had taken a 403½ to 400½ lead over Governor Cox, and maintained the lead until the 39th round, when the votes shifted to 468½ to 440 in Cox's favor. As midnight arrived, voting was in progress on a motion to adjourn.

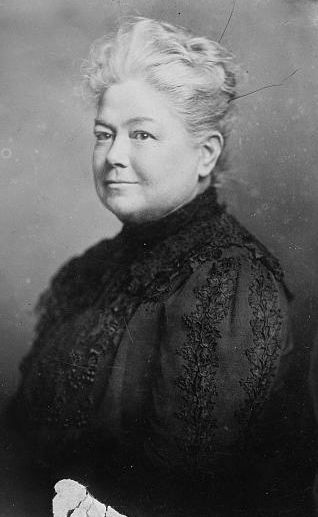
Clay

- Laura Clay, one of the Kentucky delegates to the Democratic National Convention, became the first American woman to receive a vote for a presidential nomination for a major U.S. political party. On the 33rd ballot, Augustus O. Stanley, the chairman of the Kentucky delegation, cast one of the state's 26 votes for Mrs. Clay.
- The Spa Conference between the Supreme War Council (composed of the prime ministers of the Allied nations who had won the First World War) and the German Reich, opened in the town of Spa in Belgium.
- Died:
  - Max Klinger, 63, German painter and sculptor (b. 1857)
  - Israel Friedlander, 43, Polish-born American rabbi and Zionist leader; murdered, along with Rabbi Bernard Cantor, while on a relief mission in Ukraine (b. 1876)

== July 6, 1920 (Tuesday) ==
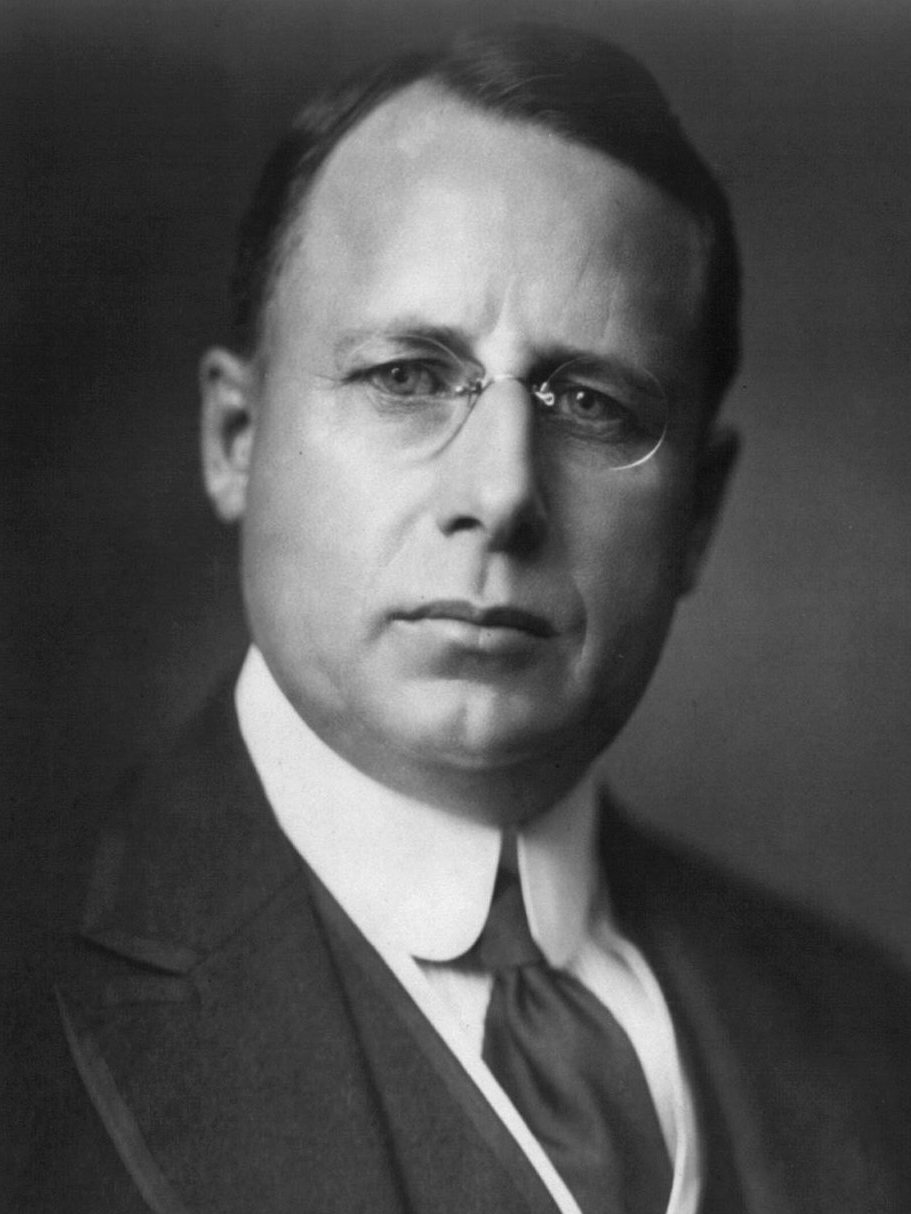
Ohio Governor Cox, the Democratic Party nominee

- The Democratic Convention finally had a nominee for President of the United States at 1:39 in the morning in San Francisco, as Ohio Governor James M. Cox was picked by delegates on the 44th ballot, with 699½ votes cast. "[I]t was apparent that before the ballot was completed he would obtain more than 729 votes, the two-thirds majority required to nominate," The New York Times noted, and the Vice Chairman of the Democratic National Committee then "interrupted the voting and moved to have the nomination made unanimous." The 42nd balloting began at 12:26 in the morning.
- King Christian X of Denmark ratified the treaty with Germany, returning the northern part of the former German Duchy of Schleswig to Danish control as the province of Slesvig.
- A mob in Paris, Texas, forced its way into the jail at the Lamar County courthouse and seized two African American brothers, Irving Arthur and Herman Arthur, who had been arrested on suspicion of the July 2 murder of their landlord and his son. The group then took the Arthur brothers to the county fairgrounds and burned the men at the stake.
- With the help of an army of 100,000 Cossacks, General Pyotr Wrangel's White Russian Army announced that it had surrounded and captured 18 regiments of the Red Army Cavalry, taking 20,000 prisoners and driving the Bolsheviks from Novorossiysk, Taganrog and Ekaterinodar.
- Franklin D. Roosevelt, the Assistant U.S. Secretary of the Navy, was nominated by the Democratic Party for Vice President of the United States. Roosevelt, the selection of Democratic nominee James M. Cox, was approved by acclamation without a roll call vote.
- Died: Andrew Traynor, 77, American Union soldier, Medal of Honor recipient (b. 1843)

== July 7, 1920 (Wednesday) ==
- Arthur Meighen agreed to become the ninth Prime Minister of Canada. At the age of 44, he was the youngest person to serve as head of the Canadian government. Robert Borden, the outgoing premier had recommended to the Governor-General, the Duke of Devonshire, that Meighen would be the ideal successor. The formal transfer of power took place on Saturday, July 10.
- The government of Mexico reported a ceasefire agreement with Pancho Villa as terms of surrender were being discussed, to last until July 14. Villa's demands were that the 1917 Mexican constitution be abolished and that the 1857 constitution be restored, that General Plutarco Elias Calles be dismissed as Minister of War, and that civilian elections be held.
- The U.S. Department of State announced the lifting of a ban on American trade with the Soviet Union, but said that diplomatic relations would not be established.
- Born:
  - William T. Coleman, American attorney and judge who served as U.S. Secretary of Transportation from 1975 to 1977, and the second African American to serve on a U.S. presidential cabinet; in Philadelphia (d. 2017)
  - Frank "Sandy" Tatum, American attorney who served as president of the United States Golf Association from 1978 to 1980 (d. 2017)

== July 8, 1920 (Thursday) ==
- In the city of Spa in Belgium, the Allied powers gave a 24-hour ultimatum to Germany for a reduction of the German Army from 200,000 to 150,000 by the end of October, and to 100,000 by the end of January, 1921. Speaking for the Allies, British Prime Minister David Lloyd George said that if the German government failed to sign an acceptance of the disarmament plan by 12:00 noon on July 9, the Allied Powers were prepared to send troops across the Rhine river to occupy Germany.
- The Louisiana state legislature adjourned at midnight without taking up the question of the women's suffrage amendment. The Nineteenth Amendment to the United States Constitution would take effect the following month. Almost 50 years later, Louisiana's legislature would finally ratify the amendment.

== July 9, 1920 (Friday) ==
- At the Spa Conference in Belgium on terms of Germany's post-war obligations, representatives of Germany agreed to the reduction of the republic's army.

== July 10, 1920 (Saturday) ==
- The Canadian province of New Brunswick became the first to consider whether to stay with the nationwide prohibition that had been enacted in 1918. New Brunswick voters opted overwhelmingly (41,436 to 20,769) in favor of keeping the prohibition against liquor, and a second proposal to allow the sale of beer and light wine failed, with only 23,713 for and 38,375 against.
- The Ford Motor Company announced its purchase of the Detroit, Toledo & Ironton Railroad and of 400,000 acres of forest land for use in its automobiles. The next week, Ford purchased his own coal mines, the Banner Fork Coal Company, in Harlan County, Kentucky.
- Glinda of Oz, the 14th and last of L. Frank Baum's book series, was published 14 months after Baum's death.
- Beijing was placed under martial law as Zhang Zuolin traveled to Tianjin to negotiate peace.
- Born: Owen Chamberlain, American physicist and 1959 Nobel Prize laureate for his discovery of the antiproton with Emilio Segrè; in San Francisco (d. 2006)
- Died: Lord Fisher, 79, British Admiral of the Fleet in the Royal Navy's First Sea Lord during World War I, died of cancer (b. 1841)

== July 11, 1920 (Sunday) ==
- Voting was conducted in a plebiscite in two regions of the province of East Prussia, within Germany's Free State of Prussia, to determine whether the residents of each region wished to continue to be citizens of the German Reich or for their land to become part of the Republic of Poland. Voters in the regions of Allenstein and Marienwerder voted overwhelmingly to remain part of East Prussia.
- The Allied premiers at Spa agreed that Poland would receive defense aid if it agreed to return to the frontiers that it had had prior to going to war with the Soviet Union, and demanded a ceasefire between the Soviets and the Poles.
- Poland's Army was driven out of the Belarusan capital of Minsk by local Bolsheviks and Russian Soviet troops.
- Born:
  - Yul Brynner, Russian-born American stage actor who won two Tony Awards (for The King and I (1951) and an Academy Award for The King and I (1956) ) as Yuli Borisovich Briner, in Vladivostok, Far Eastern Republic (present-day Russia) (d. 1985, lung cancer)
  - Zecharia Sitchin, Soviet-born British author, proponent of the "ancient astronauts" theory of human civilization, wrote the book series The 12th Planet; in Baku, Azerbaijan SSR (present-day Azerbaijan (d. 2010)
- Died:
  - Eugénie, 94, Spanish-born countess, last Empress of France during the reign of her husband, Napoleon III from 1853 until his death in 1873 (b. 1826)
  - Charles Stephens, 57-58, British daredevil; killed in an attempt to go over the Niagara Falls in an oak barrel (b. 1862)

== July 12, 1920 (Monday) ==
- Soviet Russia signed a treaty with Lithuania, acknowledging Lithuania's independence and bringing an end to the Lithuanian–Soviet War. On June 14, 1940, the independence of the Republic of Lithuania would come to an end with an invasion by the Soviet Union, and the creation of the Lithuanian SSR as part of the Soviet Union.
- Japan's House of Representatives rejected a resolution to grant women the right to vote, with only 155 in favor and 283 against.
- Vermont's Governor Percival W. Clement declined to call a special session of the state legislature to consider the 19th Amendment on women's suffrage.
- Sports promoter George "Tex" Rickard took advantage of the recently passed Walker Law and signed an ambitious ten-year lease at $300,000 a year for exclusive use of Madison Square Garden. Within the first eight months of the lease, Rickard had over one million dollars in earnings on his investment.
- George Shima, Japanese-American businessman and President of the Japanese Association of America, testified before the California House Committee on Immigration that the state should legalize intermarriage between Japanese and Americans. "There may be objections now," he said, "but a hundred years from now we will look back upon it as all right."
- Born: Randolph Quirk, British linguist, co-founder of the Survey of English Usage project; as Charles Randolph Quirk, near Kirk Michael, Isle of Man (d. 2017)

== July 13, 1920 (Tuesday) ==
- Bolivia's President José Gutiérrez Guerra was overthrown in a coup led by General Bautista Saavedra, who led a junta of several officers and then won an election in 1921. Gutiérrez had been elected president in 1917 as the Liberal Party candidate. Saavedra, leader of the Republican Party, brought an end to 21 years of Liberal Party rule would serve as President of Bolivia until his term's expiration in 1925.
- The United Kingdom and Japan reported to the League of Nations that they were renewing treaty of alliance.
- The Trades Union Congress of the United Kingdom conducted a vote on the future of Ireland, with union members casting card votes overwhelmingly (almost 2.76 million to 1.64 million) in favor of withdrawing British troops from Ireland and Russia, and establishing a separate Irish parliament.
- Born: Anna Halprin (stage name for as Hannah Schuman) American choreographer and dancer, known for her innovations in postmodern dance and for her books on "The Five Stages of Healing" following her recovery from cancer diagnosed in 1972;, in Winnetka, Illinois (d. 2021)

== July 14, 1920 (Wednesday) ==
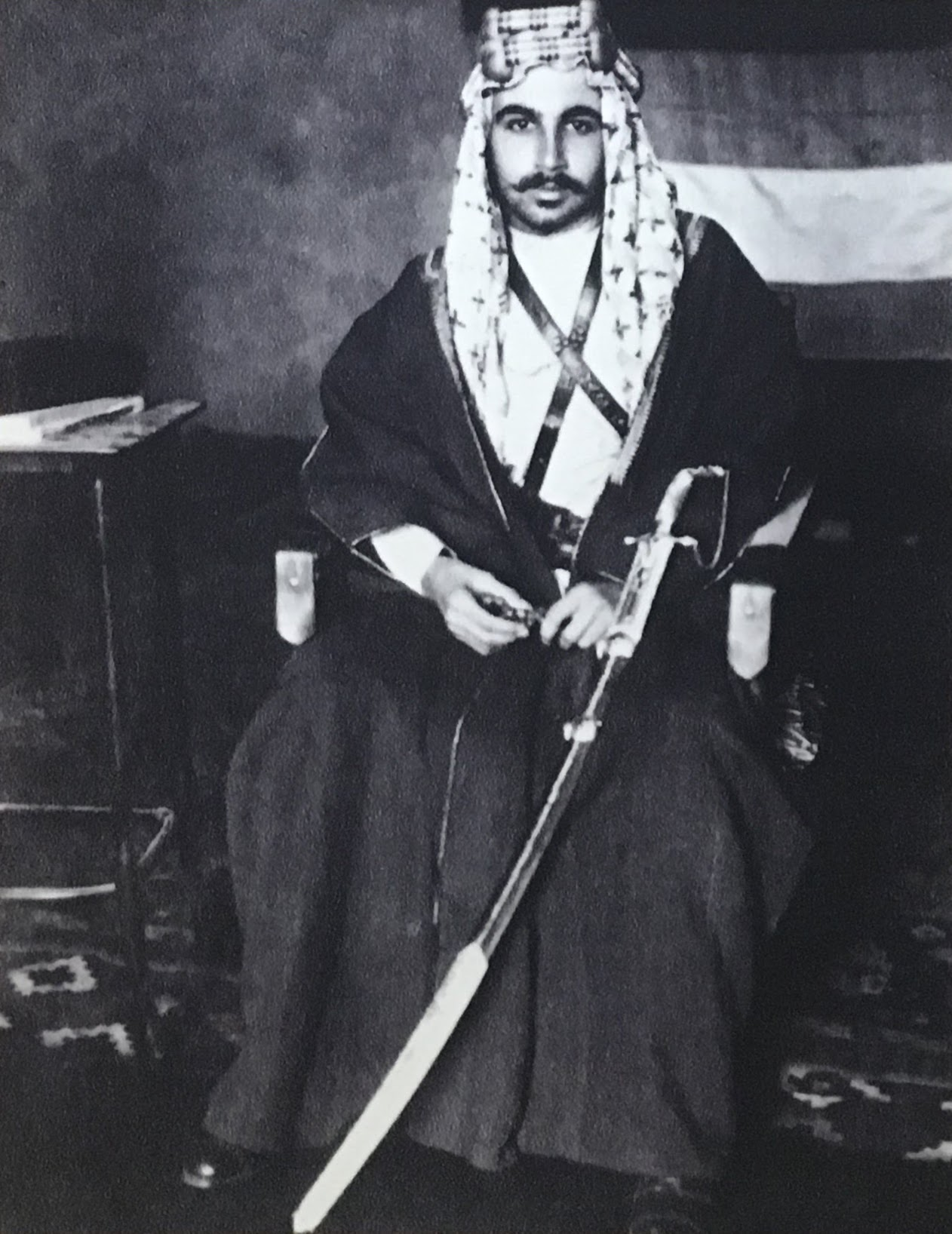
King Faisal of Syria

- General Henri Gouraud, France's new High Commissioner for Syria, issued an ultimatum to Faisal al-Hashemi, the self-proclaimed King of Syria, demanding unopposed access to the railway between Riyaq (in modern-day Lebanon) and Aleppo, with a deadline of July 20. King Faisal responded favorably before the deadline, but on July 22, Gourard sent in occupational troops and issued additional demands.
- Born:
  - Tom Neil, British RAF flying ace who downed 14 enemy aircraft in World War II; in Bootle (d. 2018)
  - Marijohn Wilkin, American gospel music songwriter, known for "One Day at a Time"; as Marijohn Melson, in Kemp, Texas (d. 2006)
  - Hewitt Dunn, American gunner and bombardier during World War II and The Korean war. He remains one of the United States Air Force most decorated Enlisted men and was the only man in the Eighth Air Force to fly over 100 combat missions (d. 1961)
- Died: Albert von Keller, 76, German painter (b. 1844)

== July 15, 1920 (Thursday) ==
- The Allies served an ultimatum on Germany demanding delivery of two million tons of German coal per month, or 24 million per year, less than the 29 million per year agreed upon in the Treaty of Versailles. Germany responded that it had capacity to deliver no more than 1.1 million per month.

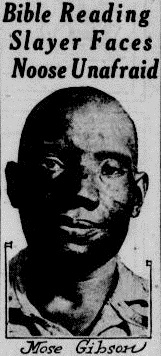
Gibson

- Serial killer Mose Gibson killed his seventh and last victim. Gibson broke into the home of Roy G. Trapp, a wealthy rancher near Fullerton, California, and beat Trapp to death with a miner's hammer. He then beat Trapp's wife unconscious and raped her. Gibson was arrested in Drake, California, after his description was recognized by a telegraph operator. Gibson confessed to the murder of Trapp, as well as the June murder of Mr. and Mrs. Jacob Earhart in Arizona, and victims in Louisiana and Florida. Convicted of the Trapp murder, Gibson was hanged on September 24 at the San Quentin State Prison.
- Chile mobilized 10,000 of its troops after Bolivian rebels deported former President Gutierrez to the port of Arica.
- Sinn Féin raided the Dublin post office during the daytime and, without encountering resistance, carried away government mail and mail addressed to law enforcement agencies.
- Meeting in Chicago, delegates of the Farmer-Labor Party nominated Parley Park Christensen for President and Max F. Hayes for Vice President.
- The America's Cup yachting race series was held for the first time since 1903. The UK challenger, Sir Thomas Lipton's yacht, Shamrock IV defeated the American championship representative, Resolute, in the first race. No foreign challenger had won a single race except on October 19, 1871, when England's Livonia outraced the U.S. yacht Columbia.

== July 16, 1920 (Friday) ==
- The Treaty of Saint-Germain-en-Laye with Austria, and many of the "Minority Treaties" all signed on September 10, 1919, between the founding members of the League of Nations and future League members, went into effect in accordance with their terms.
- The world's first public radiotelephone service was inaugurated to link California's Catalina Island to land lines on the mainland through a relay station at the Los Angeles suburb of San Pedro.
- Born: Larry Jansen, American major league baseball pitcher; in Verboort, Oregon (d. 2009)

== July 17, 1920 (Saturday) ==
- After considering objections by Turkey to terms for a peace treaty to end the First World War, the Allied Powers delivered a ten-day ultimatum to sign the treaty, as slightly modified, or face the prospect of the Allies "ejecting the Turks from Europe once and for all."
- The U.S. Secretary of the Navy approved General Order 541 for the standard nomenclature of official identification letters and numbers for all ships, ranging from "AC-5" for the auxiliary collier USS Vulcan, to "SS-152" for the second line submarine USS H-9. The prefixes ZK, ZN and ZR were reserved for airships to be added to the fleet in the future.
- Author Sinclair Lewis delivered the completed manuscript for his bestselling novel Main Street to Harcourt Publishing.
- Born:
  - Juan Antonio Samaranch, Spanish sports administrator, served as the 7th president of the International Olympic Committee from 1980 to 2001; in Barcelona (d. 2010)
  - Gordon Gould, American physicist who was credited with coining the word "laser" and was first to realize the concept but who failed to patent it before another inventor; in New York City (d. 2005)
- Died: Charles E. Courtney, 70, American rower, coach of Cornell University's championship Intercollegiate Rowing Association team (b. 1849)

== July 18, 1920 (Sunday) ==
- The largest weed colony of plants descended from a common ancestor (a clonal growth, covering 99 acres (40 ha)) was found by botanist Harvey A. Ward, who discovered the field of Gaylussacia brachycera (box huckleberry) "near Losh's Run, Perry County, Pennsylvania."
- Hammonasset Beach State Park, the most popular summer attraction in the U.S. state of Connecticut, opened to the public near the town of Madison.
- Born: Dolph Sweet, American actor, best known as Nell Carter's co-star in Gimme a Break!; as Adolphus J. Sweet, in New York City (d. 1985)
- Died:
  - Prince Joachim of Prussia, 29, youngest son and sixth child of Wilhelm II, committed suicide following the loss of his royal fortune and divorce from his wife. (b. 1890)
  - Albert Zürner, 30, German diver, 1908 Olympic gold medalist, inductee into the International Swimming Hall of Fame, was killed in a diving accident (b. 1890)

== July 19, 1920 (Monday) ==
- The Second Congress of Communist International (Comintern) opened in Russia at Saint Petersburg and, on July 23, moved to Moscow where it lasted until August 7. At the conference, Lenin's Twenty-one Conditions for the admission of a Communist party into Comintern (19 of which were published in advance of the meeting) were adopted.
- What was, at the time, "the largest and most powerful wireless station in the world", was completed in France near Bordeaux. With a capability to send messages "half way around the world," the station had eight antenna towers each 200 metres (660 ft) high.
- Born:
  - Robert Mann, American violinist and composer, co-founder of the Juilliard String Quartet; in Portland, Oregon (d. 2018)
  - Émile Idée, French professional road bicycle racer, five time Critérium National winner; in Nouvion-le-Comte, Hauts-de-France département (d. 2024)
- Died: Hasan bey Aghayev, 45, Azerbaijan Democratic Republic politician, was assassinated while visiting Tbilisi, Georgia (b. 1875)

== July 20, 1920 (Tuesday) ==
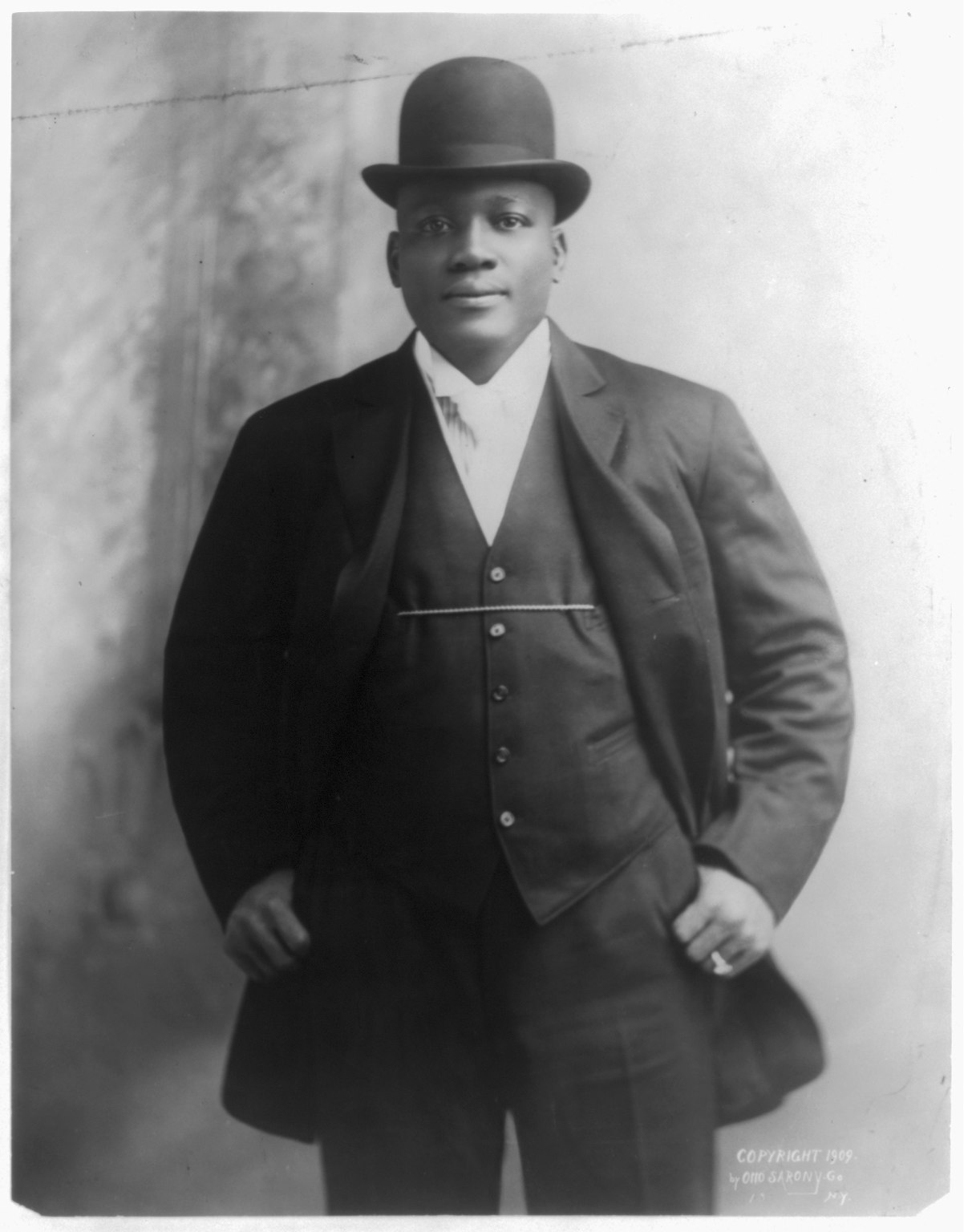
Johnson

- Jack Johnson, the former World Heavyweight Boxing Champion, surrendered to U.S. authorities at the Mexican border, more than seven years after fleeing the country to avoid prison. With newsreel cameras rolling, the former champion and Los Angeles County Sheriff John Cline walked together from Tijuana over to the border patrol office at San Ysidro, California, at 10:30 in the morning local time. Johnson served slightly less than a year at the United States Penitentiary in Leavenworth, Kansas, as inmate number 15461.
- France's Assemblée nationale approved of Prime Minister Alexandre Millerand by a margin of 420 to 152 in a vote of confidence.
- The British yacht Shamrock IV, piloted by Sir Thomas Lipton, took a 2 to 0 lead over the defending U.S. champion, Resolute, in the best 3-of-5 America's Cup series. With Shamrock IV one victory away from winning the Cup for the first time, Resolute was put in the situation that it "must take three straight to keep the famous cup on this side of the Atlantic."

== July 21, 1920 (Wednesday) ==
- The Interallied Mission to Poland began, with a delegation of French and British diplomats traveling to Warsaw in order to negotiate a peaceful end to the Polish–Soviet War. British Prime Minister David Lloyd George told the House of Commons "If ever a nation in history has gone war mad, that nation is Poland. The present Polish government has not the slightest support of a majority of the people," and added, "I am depending upon the wisdom and farsightedness of the Bolsheviks to end the war when they realize the Allies' support is with the Poles." Meanwhile, the evacuation of Warsaw began as women and children left the city by train in advance of a Soviet invasion.
- In the third round of the America's Cup yachting race, Shamrock IV and Resolute finished the 30 nautical miles (56 km; 35 mi) course in exactly the same amount of time — 4 hours, 3 minutes and 6 seconds— but Resolute was awarded the victory based on a seven-minute time allowance.
- Born:
  - Isaac Stern, Polish-born American violinist; in Krzemieniec, Poland (present-day Kremenets, Ukraine) (d. 2001)
  - Jean Daniel, French journalist and author, founder of the weekly news magazine Le Nouvel Observateur; as Jean Daniel Bensaid, in Blida, French Algeria (present-day Algeria) (d. 2020)
  - Gunnar Thoresen, Norwegian football forward, member of the Norway national team from 1946 to 1959; in Larvik (d. 2017)
  - Constant, Dutch painter and sculptor; as Constant Anton Nieuwenhuys in Amsterdam (d. 2005)

== July 22, 1920 (Thursday) ==
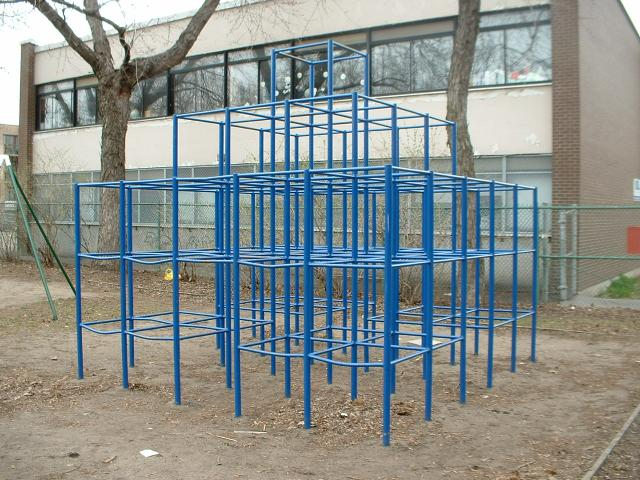
A "jungle gym"

- The patent application for the newly invented playground structure of interlocking horizontal bars and uprights, called the "jungle gym" (also known as the "monkey bars"), was filed by Chicago lawyer Sebastian Hinton and his company, Junglegym, Inc., under the title "climbing structure". Hinton, a resident of Winnetka, Illinois, wrote in his application, "I have designed a climbing apparatus, so proportioned and constructed that it provides a kind of forest top through which a troop of children may play in a manner somewhat similar to that of a troop of monkeys through the tree tops in a jungle." U.S. Patent No. 1,471,465 was awarded on October 23, 1923.
- Losing the Polish–Soviet War, Poland replaced its government as the nation's chief of state, General Józef Piłsudski, dismissed recently appointed Prime Minister Władysław Grabski and selected Wincenty Witos and a new cabinet of ministers. The selection of Witos, leader of the Polish Peasants' Party, was a compromise to the Soviet demand that a soviet government be appointed before negotiations would be considered. Witos then transmitted a request to Moscow asking for an armistice in the war. Pilsudski also placed General Tadeusz Rozwadowski in command of the defending Polish troops.
- Ottoman Sultan Mehmed VI convened a Crown Council (Suray-i Saltanat), at the Yıldız Palace in Istanbul, attended by 55 prominent royal, political and military figures, including his prime minister, Grand Vizier Damat Ferid Pasha. The group recommended in favor of signing the treaty with the Allied Powers leaving Turkey intact, while dividing the lands of the Ottoman Empire, and some recommended that he abdicate his throne.
- U.S. Senator Warren G. Harding of Ohio, who had been nominated as the Republican Party candidate for president on June 12, opened his national campaign as the ceremonial formal notification was delivered to him at his home at 380 Mount Vernon Avenue in Marion, Ohio. Harding then delivered his acceptance speech from his front porch to a crowd of thousands of supporters.
- The Prohibition Party nominated Aaron S. Watkins as its third-party presidential candidate and D. Leigh Colvin for vice president, at its convention in Lincoln, Nebraska. The Prohibitionists, having accomplished their purpose in ratification of the Eighteenth Amendment to the United States Constitution, would win slightly less than 189,000 votes in the presidential election.
- Born: Hubert "Bertie" Lewis, American-born Royal Air Force airman and anti-nuclear activist; in Chicago (d. 2010)
- Died:
  - William Kissam Vanderbilt, 70, American multimillionaire, businessman, philanthropist, and horse breeder (b. 1849)
  - May Wright Sewall, 76, American women's rights activist and suffragist; died of kidney disease (b. 1844)

== July 23, 1920 (Friday) ==
Kenya colonial flag

- By an order in council, the United Kingdom annexed the British East Africa Protectorate and declared it the colony of Kenya, with Major General Edward Northey as the first colonial governor. Northey chose the name of the colony from Mount Kenya, which, in turn, was derived from the Kikuyu language name for the snow-capped peak, Kere Nygaga for "mountain of whiteness." Colonial status would continue until December 12, 1963, with the granting of independence to Kenya.

== July 24, 1920 (Saturday) ==
- The French Army (composed mostly of troops from Algeria, Morocco and Senegal) fought an army of 2,000 Arab volunteers at the Battle of Maysalun outside of Damascus. After eight hours, the Syrian defenders were routed and Yusuf al-'Azma, King Faisal's Minister of War, was among the dead. French forces then marched into Damascus, "marking the start of an unhappy colonial occupation that would last twenty-six years." King Faisal of Syria and his supporters fled Damascus to British protection in Palestine.
- The Soviet Union agreed to a temporary armistice in the Polish-Soviet War, as Soviet Foreign Affairs Commissar Georgy Chicherin replied to Poland's request for a ceasefire on Soviet terms. Chicherin announced that General Mikhail Tukhachevsky would send a flag of truce to Poland's General Rozwadowski to allow Polish negotiators safe passage to a neutral zone.
- Born: Bella Abzug, American politician, lawyer, and feminist, U.S. Representative for New York from 1971 to 1977; as Bella Savitsky, in New York City (d. 1998)

== July 25, 1920 (Sunday) ==
- General Mariano Goybet and the French Army marched into Damascus to begin France's mandate over Syria, two weeks in advance of his commanding officer, General Henri Gourard. Making a reference to the First Crusade more than 800 years earlier, General Goybet then made a visit to the Umayyad Mosque, burial place of the 12th century Muslim commander Saladin, and declared "Saladin, nous voici."— "Saladin, we're back." The remark is usually attributed to General Gouraud.
- Born: Rosalind Franklin, English chemist and X-ray crystallographer, recognized posthumously for her work that led to the discovery of the double helix structure of DNA; in London (d. 1958)

== July 26, 1920 (Monday) ==
- The Boston Post printed the first of a series of investigative reports exposing Charles Ponzi's fraudulent investment scheme, the "Securities Exchange Company." The newspaper's findings would lead to the Massachusetts investigation that would bring a halt to Ponzi's activities and would add the phrase "Ponzi scheme" — used in the July 26 headline — to the English language.
- Chile's presidential election was decided by two electoral votes a month after the June 25 popular vote. Arturo Alessandri had 179 votes and his opponent, Luis Barros Borgoño had 175.

== July 27, 1920 (Tuesday) ==
- The America's Cup would continue to stay in the United States, as Resolute won the fifth race in the best-3-of-5 series after losing the first two outings against the British challenger Shamrock IV. Resolute finished one mile ahead of Sir Thomas Lipton's yacht, which had been only one race away from taking the trophy. The Resolute win marked the thirteenth consecutive time that a U.S. team had beaten a British challenger in the series, and the winning streak that would continue for another 63 years until the 1983 America's Cup win by the Australia II.
- Born:
  - Charles Ginsburg, American engineer and the leader of a research team at Ampex which developed one of the first practical videotape recorders; in San Francisco (d. 1992)
  - Howard Hibbett, American translator and professor of Japanese literature at Harvard University; in Akron, Ohio (d. 2019)

== July 28, 1920 (Wednesday) ==
- Archibald "Archie" Leach, a 16-year old English vaudeville performer, arrived in the United States at Ellis Island, on the ocean liner RMS Olympic along with seven other members of "The Penders" and manager Robert Pender. The troupe had been hired by American producer Charles Dillingham to be featured in a two-week engagement at New York's Globe Theatre as an act in Dillingham's Broadway production, the Good Times revue. In 1931, Leach would be signed to a movie contract with Paramount Famous Lasky Corporation (now Paramount Pictures) and would be given the stage name Cary Grant.
- Pancho Villa surrendered to Mexican Army General Eugenio Martinez, a representative of President de la Huerta, after an all-night conference. Villa and his 180 troops then traveled by train to Torreón, where they disbanded. In return for laying down his weapons, Villa was allowed to return to Chihuahua and granted an annual allowance by the Mexican government, while his 180 troops were allowed a year's pay from the Mexican Army and given farming land. Carl Haeglin, an American businessman who had been held for ransom, was released and all of the rebels were restored to full Mexican citizenship.
- The former Austro-Hungarian territory of the Duchy of Teschen was divided between Czechoslovakia (where it was called Těšín) and Poland (where it was Cieszyn), by order of the Allied Premiers at the Spa Conference.
- Two all-metal airplanes departed from New York for the first trans-continental postal flight. They would arrive in San Francisco on August 8.

== July 29, 1920 (Thursday) ==
- Women were allowed to be part of jury trial in the United Kingdom for the first time, as a result of the new Sex Disqualification (Removal) Act 1919 that had been granted royal assent on December 23. At the court of quarter sessions in Bristol, William Henry Ayton was put on trial on charges of stealing parcels from a railway station. R. E. Dummett, the prosecutor, began his opening statement by saying "Ladies and gentlemen of the jury— this the first occasion on which I have used this unfamiliar phrase. As far as I know, it has not been used before in the annals of the jurisdiction in this country, and certainly not in this city." The jury of six men and six women found Ayton guilty of the crime charged and he was sentenced to one year in jail.

== July 30, 1920 (Friday) ==
- The 1st World Scout Jamboree opened at Olympia in London.
- With two days left before the supply of coal for railroads would be exhausted, U.S. President Wilson sent a telegram to John L. Lewis of the United Mine Workers of America, warning Lewis to end the walkout of coal miners in Illinois and Iowa or face the end of government recognition of the UMWA. "[Y]our action in refusing to mine coal on the terms which you had accepted may result in great suffering in many households during the coming winter and interfere with the continuation of industrial and agricultural activity," Wilson wrote, adding "the violation of the terms of your solemn obligation impairs your own good name" and "destroys the confidence which is the basis of all mutual agreements." The President promised to revisit the findings of the Bituminous Coal Commission in August about alleged inequalities in an agreement, but not "as long as the mine workers continue on strike."
- A record sized crowd for a golf match (more than 7,000 people) the largest group to ever witness a golf match in the United States, came to the Belmont Country Club at Waverley, Massachusetts, to watch English professional golfers Harry Vardon and Ted Ray play against the top U.S. amateur team of Francis Ouimet and Jesse Guilford. The British pros won the exhibition match, hyped as a revenge match for Vardon's victory over Ouimet and Ray in a tiebreaker playoff in the 1913 U.S. Open.
- Born: Martin Knowlton, American travel agent and hostel administrator, co-founder of Elderhostel; in Dallas (d. 2009)

== July 31, 1920 (Saturday) ==
- France prohibited the sale or prescription of contraceptives, as well as forbidding the distribution of "antinatalist propaganda", as a means of remedying the loss of 1.5 million men during World War I. Sociologists would determine later that the severe penalties did not restore the fertility rate to its pre-war level of an average of 2.5 children per women.
- The price of traveling by train in the United States was increased by 20 percent per person, and freight shipping rates increased by 40%, in a decision by the U.S. Interstate Commerce Commission.
- The Byelorussian Soviet Socialist Republic was created by the Belarusan Communist Party, 20 days after the capital city of Minsk was recovered from Poland's control. In 1922, the Russian-dominated state would join with other "Soviet Socialist Republics" (the Russian Federation, the Trancaucasian Federation, and the Ukrainian Republic) to form the Soviet Union.
- The Communist Party of Great Britain was formed by representatives of various British revolutionary socialist groups, at a meeting at the Cannon Street Hotel in London.
- Died: Ion Dragoumis, 41, Greek diplomat, was assassinated by Pavlos Gyparis, bodyguard of Greek Prime Minister Eleftherios Venizelos.
