= Bernard Belleau =

Canadian molecular pharmacologist

Bernard Belleau OC FRSC (March 15, 1925 – September 4, 1989) was a Canadian molecular pharmacologist best known for his role in the discovery of Lamivudine, a drug used in the treatment of HIV and Hepatitis B infection.

== Biography ==
Born in Montreal, Quebec, he gained his BSc (1947) and MSc (1948) from the Université de Montréal and his PhD in 1950 at McGill University. During his time at the Sloan-Kettering Institute for Cancer Research he discovered the Fujimoto–Belleau reaction, which is named after him and George I. Fujimoto. After various academic research postings in the U.S. and Canada he became Professor of Chemistry at the University of Ottawa in 1961. He moved to McGill University in 1971. Belleau worked in the 1960s and 1970s on research programs with Bristol Laboratories, one of which led to the non-narcotic analgesic Butorphanol. Butorphanol was found to have over five times the potency of morphine with far fewer side effects. Butorphanol is often used to relieve post-surgical pain and in the management of migraine headaches.

In the mid-1980s he helped found what became the biotech company BioChem Pharma with colleagues Francesco Bellini and Gervais Dionne. The trio began work on the anti-AIDS drug, 2,3 dideoxy – 3-thiacytidine (3TC). Just prior to his death in 1989 he laid the foundations for Lamivudine's development, which was a significant advance in the fight against AIDS, and is credited with saving over 2 million lives.

In 1981, he was made an Officer of the Order of Canada. In 1978, he was awarded the Quebec government's Prix Marie-Victorin. In 1979, he was awarded the Royal Society of Canada's McLaughlin Medal. In 2000, he was inducted into the Canadian Medical Hall of Fame. In 1977/78, he was awarded a Killam fellowship from The Canada Council for the Arts.
