= Bernard Cantor =

Rabbi and Jewish activist

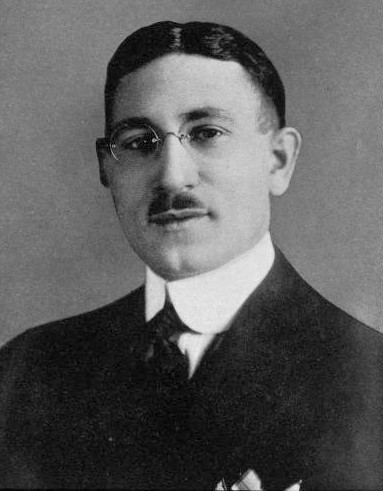
- Bernard Cantor; undated photo from memorial book in his and Israel Friedlander's honor
- Born: Bernard Cantor; March 30, 1892; Buffalo, New York, USA
- Died: July 5, 1920 (aged 28); Yarmolintsky, Ukraine
- Occupations: Rabbi, Jewish activist
- Years active: 1915–1920
- Parent(s): Isaac Cantor and Rose Rachel Cantor

Bernard Cantor (March 30, 1892 – July 5, 1920) was an American-born, Reform rabbi with experience in social work who volunteered to work as an emissary for the American Jewish Joint Distribution Committee (also known as the Joint or the JDC) in Poland and Ukraine (then Galicia) following World War I and the Russian Revolution, providing relief to Jewish communities there, until he was murdered along with his colleague, Israel Friedlander, while on a philanthropic mission.

== Life in the United States ==
Cantor was born in Buffalo, New York, the son of immigrants from Eastern Europe, Isaac Cantor and Rose Rachel Cantor (née Friedland) and the brother of Maxwell, Maurice, Nathan, Ida, Esther and Ethel. He received his BA and MA degrees at the University of Cincinnati, where he was inducted into Phi Beta Kappa, did post-graduate work at Columbia University, New York and was ordained as a rabbi by the Hebrew Union College in Cincinnati, Ohio in 1916. In 1915-16 he became an associate instructor in the department of philosophy at the University of Cincinnati and an instructor at Hebrew Union College. Cantor served as a student rabbi in various communities during his years in rabbinical school. After ordination he served as rabbi of Temple Emanuel in Wichita, Kansas, where he also organized the city's Legal Aid Bureau. From 1917 to 1920 he was the associate rabbi of the Stephen Wise Free Synagogue; he worked to promote inter-faith cooperation. According to a memorial book published in 1920 after his death, "In connection with the social service division of the Free Synagogue, he organized and led the churches and the synagogues of the Central Park district during the time of the [Spanish] Influenza epidemic, in the effort to prevent the spread of this disease". In 1920 he was appointed rabbi of the Free Synagogue of Flushing, New York. At a service in his honor at the Free Synagogue on the eve of his departure, Cantor said, "In consonance with our traditions, we again go forth to serve our suffering people, and gladly do I go, and I rejoice at the opportunity."

== Life in Eastern Europe ==
Cantor was a member of Overseas Unit Number 1, a group of 23 volunteers from the United States who were sent to Eastern Europe by the Joint and whose task was to distribute funds contributed by American Jews (many of them immigrants from Eastern Europe) and to otherwise provide relief to destitute Jews in Poland and the Ukraine. They arrived in Eastern Europe in February 1920. Colleagues of his in the unit later wrote, “He was beloved by all of us for his cheerfulness, his bubbling enthusiasm and his ever-ready willingness to volunteer for difficult and hard service. When calls came – as they did so frequently, from far and near – he was always the first to go. No task was too great, no labor too menial... he managed to bring his message of cheer to the great town and the small, and gladdened the hearts of those poor forsaken ones.” Cantor was in Poland and the Ukraine for a mere five or six months before his death.

== Death ==
The Joint Distribution Committee archives contain testimony as follows, "While in Kamenets-Podolsky allocating JDC funds among local Jewish relief agencies, Cantor met up with Professor Israel Friedlaender of the Jewish Theological Seminary in New York, who was also on a JDC mercy mission. Disregarding warnings of the danger of pogroms and civil unrest in the area, Cantor and Friedlaender, together with a leader of the Tarnopol Jewish community named Grossman, set out early on July 5, 1920 to return to Lemberg. On the highway leading from Kamenets-Podolsky at the entrance to Yarmolintsy [in the Ukraine], in the vicinity of the shtetl of Sokolovka, their car was attacked by members of a Red Army cavalry unit that had broken through a section of the frontline. Cantor and Friedlaender were mistaken for Polish officers while Grossman was mistaken for a landowner. They were killed by Bolshevik soldiers and their driver escaped." Various other sources indicated that the perpetrators were Soviets, armed bandits or members of an anti-Semitic gang.

His death and Friedlander's were described as "one of the most stirring tragedies in the annals of American Jewish relief work in the Ukraine". A meeting was held in the Joint offices in New York City shortly after the murders to discuss plans for a memorial. "The murders of Cantor and Friedlaender sent shock waves through the Jewish communities of Poland and the United States." Tributes were offered by members of communities all over the world, including from Shanghai, China, where Cantor and Friedlander were eulogized as "true martyrs... to the Jewish cause". A memorial meeting sponsored by the Joint was held at Carnegie Hall in New York City on September 9, 1920, one month after the murders, and was attended by over 3,000 people; a leather-bound memorial book commemorating that meeting and honoring the two men was subsequently published.

Cantor and Friedlaender were buried in the Yarmolintsy cemetery, near the place they were murdered. The Joint's initial intention had been to return the bodies to the United States for burial but due to the chaotic conditions in the area at that time, this was deemed impossible. The area remained inaccessible for many years, the local Jewish population was annihilated in World War II, and in the year 2000 the Joint initiated a search for the graves. They were discovered in a dilapidated state; the two stones bore the men's names with identical Hebrew inscriptions: "Emissary of American Jewry who fell sanctifying God's name. July 10[sic], 1920." In accordance with the Cantor family's wishes Cantor's remains were left in place and his gravestone was restored, while Friedlander's remains was reburied in Jerusalem in 2001.

== Legacy ==
As of April 2022, the American Jewish Joint Distribution Committee, the leading global Jewish humanitarian organization, founded in 1914, continues to provide humanitarian aid to hundreds of thousands of needy Ukrainian Jewish elderly and poor families, in essence carrying on the work begun by Cantor, Friedlander and their fellow emissaries over 100 years ago.

Since Bernard Cantor, unlike his colleague and fellow victim Israel Friedlaender, was unmarried and had no offspring, there was no one to carry on his name, as is the Jewish custom. Thus, various Jewish families with no family relation to Cantor took it upon themselves to memorialize Cantor by naming their sons after him. One such individual was mathematician Bernard Epstein, born one month after Cantor's death, who became one of his namesakes. Other boys born at around that time were apparently also named after Bernard Cantor.
