= George I. Fujimoto =

American chemist of Japanese descent (1920–2023)

- Born: July 1, 1920; Seattle, Washington, U.S.
- Died: April 30, 2023 (aged 102)
- Education: Harvard University, University of Michigan
- Known for: Fujimoto–Belleau reaction
- Scientific career
- Workplaces: Harvard University, University of Utah School of Medicine, Albert Einstein College of Medicine, California Institute of Technology
- Doctoral advisor: Werner E. Bachmann

George Iwao Fujimoto (July 1, 1920 – April 30, 2023) was an American chemist of Japanese descent.

== Life and career ==
Fujimoto was born in Seattle, Washington on July 1, 1920. During his studies at Harvard his family was imprisoned in an American internment camp Minidoka in Idaho. He discovered the Fujimoto–Belleau reaction, which is named after him and Bernard Belleau.

Fujimoto was widowed at the age of 99 when his wife Mary died on December 17, 2019. He died on April 30, 2023, at the age of 102.

== Sources ==
- Harvard Crimson George Fujimoto
