= Israel Friedlander =

Polish Rabbi (1876–1920)

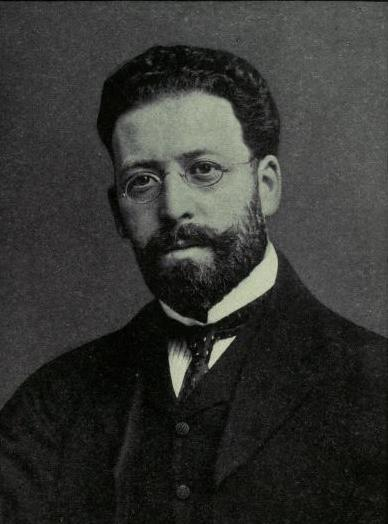
- Born: 8 September 1876; Włodawa, Poland
- Died: 5 July 1920 (aged 43) near Kamenetz-Podolsk, Ukraine
- Cause of death: Mistakenly killed by Red Army soldiers
- Occupations: Rabbi, Educator, translator, biblical scholar

Israel Friedlander, also spelled Friedlaender (8 September 1876 – 5 July 1920), was a Polish-born rabbi, educator, translator, and biblical scholar. Together with Rabbi Mordecai Kaplan, he was a founding adviser to a lecture series that became the Young Israel movement of Modern Orthodox Judaism.

== Early life and career ==
Friedlander was born in Włodawa, Poland to Pinchas Friedlander, a cattle dealer, and his wife Gittel, who was 16 years old at the time of his birth. He was the eldest of four children. As a boy, he attended cheder in Warsaw. From 1896 to 1900 he attended Berlin University and the Hildesheimer Rabbinical Seminary, where he received his rabbinic ordination. He received his PhD from the University of Strasbourg in 1901.

His first position was as a privatdozent in Semitic languages at the University of Strasbourg from 1902 to 1903. In October 1903 he came to the Jewish Theological Seminary of America as the Sabato Morais Professor of Biblical Literature and Exegesis, a position he held until his death. He also served as a history instructor at the Teacher's Institute of the Seminary.

A translator and Arabist, Friedlander was fluent in Yiddish, Russian, Babylonian and Assyrian. As his command of English was initially poor, he taught in German during his early years at the Jewish Theological Seminary. He authored, edited and translated numerous works.

== Youth movement pioneer ==
In 1909 Friedlander became the founding president of Young Judaea, an amalgam of several Zionist youth groups. In 1912, together with Rabbi Mordecai Kaplan, a professor of homiletics and philosophy of religion at the Jewish Theological Seminary, he guided young Jewish adults in combating assimilation into secular American society or Reform circles. These efforts resulted in a popular lecture series, which were a predecessor of the Young Israel movement to combat the wave of assimilation by Jews.

== Affiliations ==
Friedlander was the Chairman of the Board of Trustees of the Bureau of Education of the Jewish community in New York. He was part of the Governing Board of the Intercollegiate Menorah Society, the Executive Committee of Bureau of Education of the Jewish Community of New York City and the Executive Committee of the Federation of American Zionists.

== Relief missions ==
In 1918, Friedlander was invited to travel to Mandate Palestine as the Jewish representative of a Red Cross relief mission.

In January 1920, Friedlander traveled to Poland as part of a four-member commission of the American Jewish Joint Distribution Committee to distribute $35 million to starving Jews in Poland and Ukraine. The US State Department gave its permission for the trip, but would not issue passports or afford any protection to the commission members. On July 5, Friedlander and Rabbi Bernard Cantor were killed by Red Army cavalry soldiers of near Kamenetz-Podolsk, Ukraine after they were mistaken for Polish officers.

== Personal life ==
Friedlander married Lilian Ruth Bentwich of London, England, on 26 September 1905. They had three sons and three daughters. With his marriage, Friedlander became the brother-in-law of Norman Bentwich, the first Attorney-General of Mandate Palestine from 1918 to 1931.

After her husband's death, Lilian moved her family back to England; two years later, upon the death of her sister who was living in Palestine, she relocated to her sister's home in Zikhron Ya'akov.

== Selected bibliography ==
- Past and Present: A Collection of Jewish Essays (1905)
- The Problem of Judaism in America (1909)
- The Problem of Jewish Education in America, and the Bureau of Education of the Jewish Community of New York City (1913)
- The Present Crisis in American Jewry (1915)
- The Jews of Russia and Poland: A Bird's-Eye View of Their History and Culture (1915)
- Zionism and the World Peace (1919)
