= Mose Gibson =

American burglar and serial killer (1883–1920)

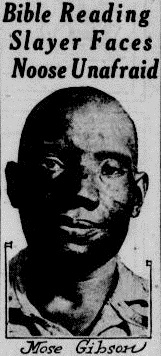
- Born: 1883; Bienville Parish, Louisiana, U.S.
- Died: September 24, 1920 (aged 36–37); San Quentin State Prison, California, U.S.
- Other names: Henry Watson "Monk" Gibson
- Status: Executed by hanging
- Conviction: First degree murder
- Penalty: Death

Details
- Victims: 3–7+
- Span of crimes: 1908–1920
- Country: United States
- States: Louisiana, Florida, Arizona, California

Mose Gibson (1883 – September 24, 1920) was an American burglar and serial killer, responsible for the murders of at least seven people in several U.S. states. Although he was convicted of a double murder and killing rancher Roy Trapp, his guilt has come into question, with allegations that his written confession was made up by the authorities.

== Life and crimes ==
Scant details are available about Gibson's early life, but it is believed that he was born somewhere in Louisiana's Bienville Parish. He was first imprisoned in January 1904 at a Baton Rouge prison for an unknown offence. According to him, he spiralled into a life of crime when he was "innocently railroaded to a southern penitentiary, where he had become a criminal [through] association."

Justice William C. Barnette, a former district attorney for the Bienville Parish, indicated a different story: prior to 1907, Gibson, using the alias of "Monk", was put on trial for ambushing and shooting at another black man. As he was regarded as a good farmhand, Barnette defended Gibson, even employing legal talent to represent him in court. His client was still found guilty and sent off to the Louisiana State Penitentiary. After serving his term, Gibson then left the state, travelling towards Florida.

Following this, Gibson engaged in criminal activities for little over a decade, allegedly committing thousands of burglaries and robberies, as well as several murders. Two often cited burglaries were committed in one night in June 1913, while he was in Omaha, Nebraska. Gibson was arrested after the first successful burglary, but managed to escape, and with the manacles still on his wrists, he burglarized another home so he could get money to have the handcuffs filed off.

He served time in four penitentiaries (in Louisiana, Ohio, Florida and Texas), escaping from the warden on two occasions (from Florida in 1917 and Texas in 1919). He never disclosed for what kind of offences he was imprisoned in Florida, but it later revealed by an oil company manager named Harris that Gibson had attempted to kill him during an argument. After their scuffle, the angered Mose returned with a gun and fired at Harris, grazing the top of his head and leaving a flesh wound.

== Murders ==
According to his initial confessions, Gibson admitted to ten murders, but later sources changed the number to seven. He admitted the following murders:

- J. R. Rivet – restaurateur killed in Addis, Louisiana, on December 24, 1908
- Unknown – a sugar mill watchman killed in Gramercy, Louisiana, in November 1910
- Unknown – a storekeeper and wagoner killed in Louisiana in November 1910
- Susan B. Clark – a woman killed in Orange City, Florida, on November 11, 1919
- Jacob Erhardt and his wife – elderly couple killed in Phoenix, Arizona, on June 6, 1920
- Roy G. Trapp – a rancher killed in Fullerton, California, on July 15, 1920

=== J. R. Rivet ===
The earliest known murder with a date that Gibson committed was that of Joseph (or James) Isadore Rivet, a restaurateur who was killed on December 24, 1908, in Addis, Louisiana. Rivet had employed the then-25-year-old Gibson, ordering him to go get something at nighttime, according to the testimony of Joe Clark, who was sent to get some chickens to cook for breakfast. Clark had left after Gibson was sent out and didn't return until the following morning, when he found Rivet beaten to death and lying in a pool of his own blood. He had been killed by a blunt and sharp instrument. Clark then called upon W. C. Mybank, with whom he later found a trunk owned by Rivet in a nearby field. The trunk had been opened and rifled through, indicating that robbery was the possible motive.

For this murder, a man named "Hobo" Brown Roberts was arrested on January 1, 1909, as an accomplice in the murder. However, not enough evidence was gathered in order to prosecute him. On May 27, a mob of about twenty men broke into the prison where Roberts was held and took him near a railroad engine, allegedly to force a confession out of him. After that night, the accused man was never seen again.

=== Susan B. Clark and Laura Marshall ===
Taking into account that Gibson confessed to murdering an Orange City woman in November 1919, authorities speculated that he could've killed middle-aged widow Susan B. Clark (or Matty Clark), who died on November 1. The same night, another unidentified woman was also robbed. Her murderer was never found, but Gibson, who was well known there, was suspected. Newspapers also mention another woman by the name of Laura Marshall, but at present, no further information is available for her case.

=== Erhardt couple ===
A well-respected couple in Phoenix, the Erhardts, were slain on June 6, 1920. Gibson, who went by the alias Henry Watson, was first arrested in Nogales for importing alcohol into the country while en route to Phoenix. After serving a 24-day sentence in Douglas, he moved on to the city, arriving either on June 3 or 4. Feeling the need to rob somebody, Gibson used a miner's hammer that he had found and entered the home through the kitchen back door. This awoke the Erhardt couple, with Jacob throwing himself at the armed intruder, only to quickly get himself almost instantaneously killed. Mrs. Erhardt fought for her life, but she was beaten and left for dead, managing to slowly crawl back to the bed and die next to her husband.

The gruesome scene was later discovered by the couple's eldest son, Jacob Jr., who immediately reported to the authorities. Investigating the crime scene would prove a challenge, as authorities only had theories with which to proceed. Allegedly, two black men driving a striped Ford were seen fleeing from the crime scene, but even with organized posses, the duo wasn't captured. Later inquiries into fingerprint evidence revealed that there was most likely only one killer, judging by where he had washed his hands and removed his bloodied clothing. During the case 150 suspects were examined and later released, with a reward surpassing $3,000 being promised to anybody who had any clues.

On June 25, a possible suspect emerged, after Mexican national Jesús María Barboa, who lived in Litchfield Park, was arrested in Nogales on June 25. He was taken to the crime scene, and under a bombardment of questions, he confessed to killing the couple. Barboa was then brought to trial, and pleaded guilty. Authorities weren't satisfied with his claims, as he seemed to be in a semi-stupor while telling his story. This resulted in Barboa being transferred to a mental facility in Florence, and despite being initially charged with the Erhardts' killings, he was later acquitted due to his insanity.

=== Roy Trapp ===
Not long after the Erhardt murders, a crime of striking similarity was committed on July 15, 1920, in Fullerton, California. A wealthy rancher by the name of Roy G. Trapp had been killed with a miner's hammer, and his wife beaten into unconsciousness and subsequently assaulted. Only two days later, the man supposedly responsible was arrested and identified as Mose Gibson. In his subsequent confession, Gibson, who had been intoxicated with wood alcohol, claimed that he entered the home with the intention of robbing it, but in the process, he awoke Mr. Trapp. The two men proceeded to scuffle, but Mose overpowered and viciously beat the rancher to death in his bedroom, before proceeding to also beat Trapp's wife and then assault her.

== Arrest ==
Gibson's arrest came thanks to a telegraph operator named Fred Lewis, who was stationed in the town of Drake. Lewis had read an account of Trapp's murder in a Los Angeles newspaper, when he noticed a black man matching the description of the suspect, who was buying tickets en route to Albuquerque. Although the two of them were alone in the office, Lewis stalled Gibson for as much as he could, before telegraphing officers from Needles to come arrest him. A group of five policemen chased after the suspect, eventually getting into a fight with Gibson, but still managed to successfully arrest him in Topock.

== Trial, sentence and death ==
Although initially refusing to speak with authorities and praying all the time, Gibson eventually confessed to killing Roy Trapp in front of agent L. A. West. Because of this, he was sentenced to hang in a three-hour trial, but not before he could be connected to the double murder of the Erhardts, based on the similar circumstances of the two cases. Shortly after, he proceeded to confess the remaining murders, but only discussed the Erhardt case in detail.

After authorities confirmed details he provided, including where the rifled furniture was, how the victims were struck down and the crime scene's locations, they declared that Gibson, who mostly prayed and read the Bible in prison, was guilty of the crime. Despite this, he was never officially charged with their murder, as he was hanged just a week after killing Trapp in San Quentin, California.

== Questionable guilt ==
Even with some of the contemporary media, Gibson's confessions were the subject of doubt. Several reasons for this are that in the initial examination, the perpetrator's fingerprints did not match those of Mose, there were two suspects, and both of them were described as having a lighter skin tone. Despite this, the authorities insisted that they had caught the right man, placing their trust in his admissions.

A few months before Gibson's execution, a Palo Alto-based organization named the Housewives' Union No. 1 wrote to Gov. Stephens to spare the condemned prisoner's life. The letter cited the case of James P. Watson, a bigamist who at that time had recently been convicted of murdering several wives, but was instead given life imprisonment.

== See also ==
- List of serial killers in the United States
