= Fujimoto–Belleau reaction =

Chemical reaction

The Fujimoto–Belleau reaction is a chemical reaction that forms cyclic α-substituted α,β-unsaturated ketones from enol lactones. The reaction was discovered in 1951 by George I. Fujimoto and Bernard Belleau. Belleau used this reaction to synthesize 1-methyl-3-keto-1,2,3,9,10,10a-hexahydrophenanthrene from a ketoacid starting material and Fujimoto demonstrated that steroids could be synthesized from naturally occurring lactone species using this method as well.

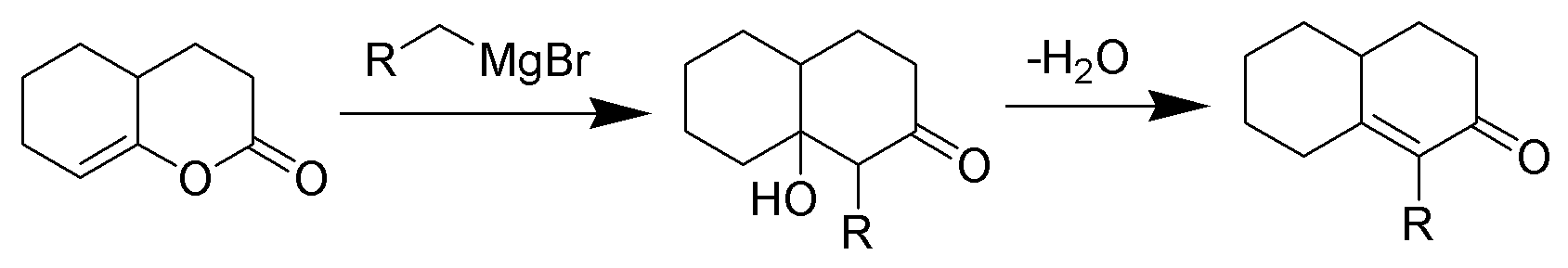
The Fujimoto-Belleau reaction

The reaction starts with opening the ring by the attack of the Grignard reagent, forming an enolate. A proton transfer occurs, forming another enolate via deprotonation of the carbon atom attached to the R group. Using the enolate, an aldol condensation then occurs with aqueous or acidic workup—i.e., aldol addition followed by an E1cB elimination of hydroxide occurs.

mechanism of the reaction

== Applications of the Fujimoto–Belleau reaction ==
=== Steroid synthesis ===
The Fujimoto–Belleau reaction is used in commonly used in steroid synthesis. The reaction can be employed in the syntheses of steroids such as cholestenone, testosterone, and cortisone. Below is a scheme for the Fujimoto–Belleau reaction invoked in steroid synthesis. Note that this pathway is not the true total syntheses for these steroids.
