= Janelle Monáe discography =

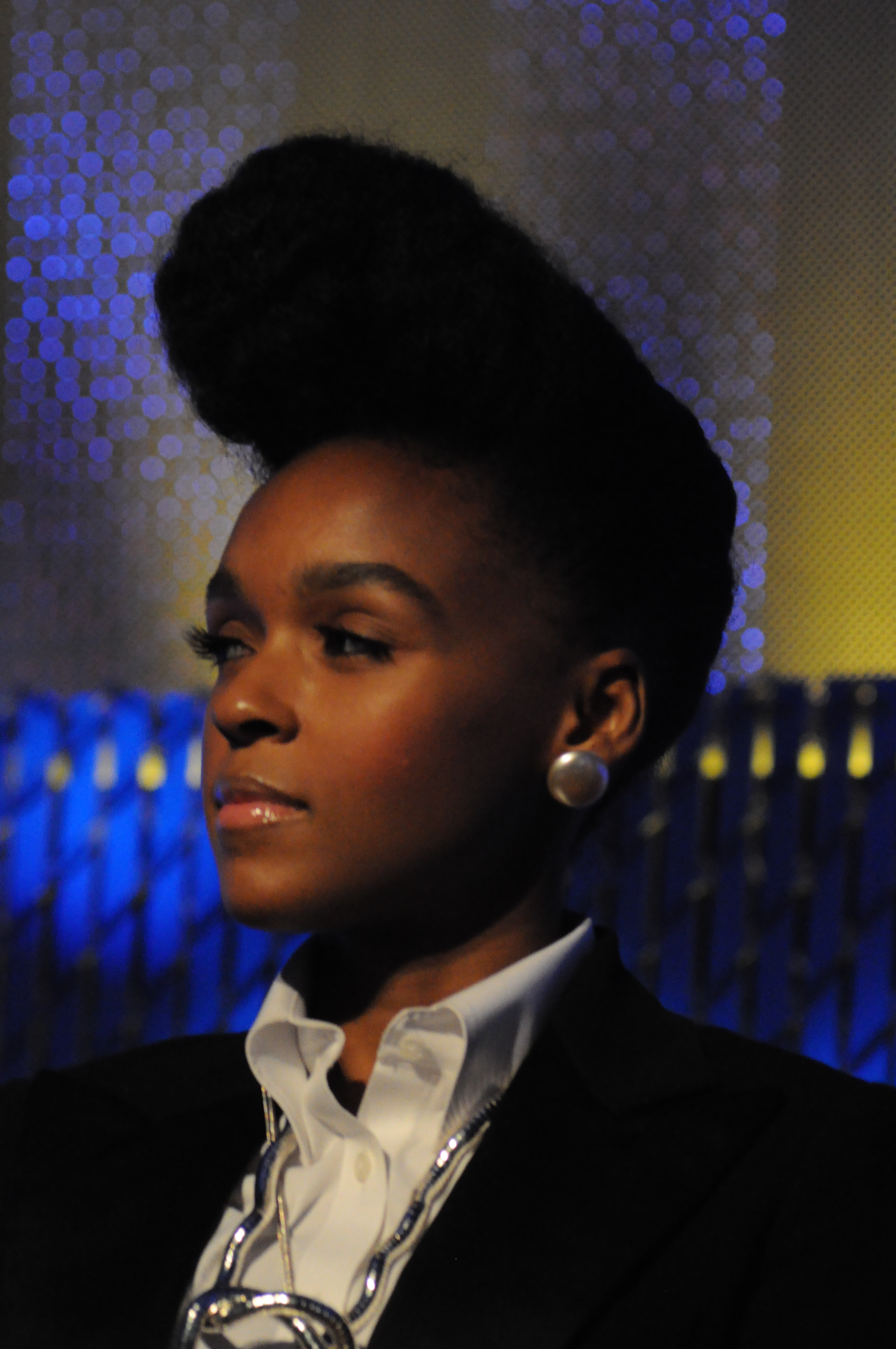
- Janelle Monáe at the 2010 Pop Conference EMPSFM in Seattle on April 15, 2010
- Studio albums: 4
- Extended plays: 4
- Singles: 23
- Music videos: 18
- Demos: 1
- Guest appearances: 24

American singer Janelle Monáe has released four studio albums, four extended plays, 23 singles and eighteen music videos. Monáe debuted with an EP, Metropolis: Suite I (The Chase), which had a modest commercial impact, peaking at number 115 on the Billboard charts in the United States. In 2010, Monáe released her debut studio album, The ArchAndroid, through Bad Boy Records; it is a concept album sequel to her first EP. The album was nominated at the 53rd Grammy Awards for Best Contemporary R&B Album and peaked the number 17 on the Billboard 200. In March 2012, "We Are Young", a song by the band fun. on which Monáe makes a guest appearance, reached the top of the Billboard Hot 100, her first appearance in the chart. Monáe released her second album, The Electric Lady, on September 10, 2013, peaking at number five on the Billboard 200 and producing four singles. Her third album, Dirty Computer, was released on April 27, 2018. In December 2018, the album received a Grammy Award nomination for Album of the Year.

== Studio albums ==
List of studio albums, with selected chart positions
Title	Album details	Peak chart positions										Certifications
Title	Album details	US	US R&B/ HH	AUS	CAN	DEN	GER	IRE	NL	SWI	UK	Certifications
The ArchAndroid	Released: May 18, 2010; Label: Bad Boy, Wondaland, Atlantic; Formats: CD, digital download, LP, streaming	17	4	—	—	15	12	24	65	36	51	BPI: Silver
The Electric Lady	Released: September 6, 2013; Label: Bad Boy, Wondaland, Atlantic; Formats: CD, digital download, LP, streaming	5	3	22	10	11	68	7	28	30	14	
Dirty Computer	Release: April 27, 2018; Label: Bad Boy, Wondaland, Atlantic; Formats: CD, digital download, LP, streaming	6	4	12	8	30	29	9	20	11	8	
The Age of Pleasure	Released: June 9, 2023; Label: Bad Boy, Wondaland, Atlantic; Formats: CD, digital download, LP, streaming	17	5	—	79	—	48	—	93	37	49	
"—" denotes a recording that did not chart or was not released in that territory.

== Demos ==
List of demos
Title	Demo details
The Audition	Released: 2003; Label: Wondaland Arts Society; Format: CD

== Extended plays ==
List of extended plays, with selected chart positions
Title	Details	Peak chart positions		
Title	Details	US	US Heat	US R&B/ HH
Metropolis: The Chase Suite	Released: August 24, 2007; Label: Bad Boy; Formats: CD, digital download, LP	115	2	20
iTunes Festival: London 2013	Released: September 9, 2013; Label: Bad Boy; Formats: Digital download	—	—	—
Wondaland Presents: The Eephus	Released: August 14, 2015; Label: Wondaland, Epic, Sony; Formats: CD, digital download	22	—	5
Spotify Singles	Released: November 14, 2018; Label: Bad Boy; Formats: Digital download	—	—	—
"—" denotes a recording that did not chart or was not released in that territory.

== Singles ==
=== As lead artist ===
List of singles and peak chart positions
Title	Year	Peak chart positions										Certifications	Album
Title	Year	US	US R&B /HH	US R&B	US AAA	BEL (FL) Tip	CAN	IRE	JPN	NZ	UK	Certifications	Album
"Lettin' Go"	2006	—	—	—	—	—	—	—	—	—	—		Got Purp? Vol. 2
"Violet Stars Happy Hunting!"	2007	—	—	—	—	—	—	—	—	—	—		Metropolis: Suite I (The Chase)
"Many Moons"	2008	—	—	—	—	—	—	—	—	—	—		Metropolis: Suite I (The Chase)
"Open Happiness" (with Brendon Urie, CeeLo Green, Patrick Stump and Travis McCoy)	2009	—	—	—	—	—	—	—	—	29	—		Non-album single
"Tightrope" (featuring Big Boi)	2010	—	—	—	—	20	—	—	— (Note: "Tightrope" did not enter the Billboard Japan Hot 100, but peaked at number 68 on the Adult Contemporary Airplay chart.)	—	—	RIAA: Gold	The ArchAndroid
"Cold War"	2010	—	—	—	—	—	—	—	—	—	—		The ArchAndroid
"Q.U.E.E.N." (featuring Erykah Badu)	2013	— (Note: "Q.U.E.E.N." did not enter the Billboard Hot 100, but peaked at number 6 on the Hot Singles Sales chart, a component of the Hot 100)	47	21	—	—	—	—	—	—	—		The Electric Lady
"Dance Apocalyptic"	2013	—	—	—	—	—	—	79	83	—	—		The Electric Lady
"PrimeTime" (featuring Miguel)	2013	— (Note: "PrimeTime" did not enter the Billboard Hot 100, but peaked at number 20 on the Bubbling Under Hot 100 Singles chart.)	36	19	—	—	—	—	—	—	—		The Electric Lady
"What Is Love"	2014	—	—	—	—	—	—	—	—	—	—		Rio 2 (Music From the Motion Picture)
"Heroes"	2014	—	—	—	—	—	—	—	—	—	—		Pepsi Beats of the Beautiful Game
"Electric Lady" (featuring Solange)	2014	—	—	—	—	—	—	—	—	—	—		The Electric Lady
"Yoga" (with Jidenna)	2015	79	24	8	—	—	—	—	—	—	—	RIAA: Gold	Wondaland Presents: The Eephus (EP)
"Make Me Feel"	2018	99	— (Note: "Make Me Feel" did not enter the Hot R&B/Hip-Hop Songs Chart, but peaked at number one on the Bubbling Under R&B/Hip-Hop Songs Chart.)	9	33	3	98	—	—	— (Note: "Make Me Feel" did not enter the NZ Top 40 Singles Chart, but peaked at number seven on the NZ Heatseeker Singles Chart.)	74	RIAA: Gold; ARIA: Gold; BPI: Silver; RMNZ: Gold	Dirty Computer
"Django Jane"	2018	—	— (Note: "Django Jane" did not enter the Hot R&B/Hip-Hop Songs Chart, but peaked at number 23 on the Rap Digital Song Sales Chart.)	—	—	—	—	—	—	—	—		Dirty Computer
"Pynk" (featuring Grimes)	2018	—	—	21	—	—	—	—	—	—	—		Dirty Computer
"I Like That"	2018	—	— (Note: "I Like That" did not enter the Hot R&B/Hip-Hop Songs Chart, but peaked at number 14 on the Bubbling Under R&B/Hip-Hop Songs Chart.)	14	—	—	—	—	—	—	—	RIAA: Gold	Dirty Computer
"That's Enough"	2019	—	—	—	—	—	—	—	—	—	—		Lady and the Tramp (Original Soundtrack)
"Turntables" (from the Amazon Prime Video film All In: The Fight for Democracy)	2020	—	—	—	37	14	—	—	—	—	—		Non-album singles
"Stronger" (from the Netflix series We the People)	2021	—	—	—	—	—	—	—	—	—	—		Non-album singles
"Say Her Name (Hell You Talmbout)" (featuring various artists)	2021	—	—	—	—	—	—	—	—	—	—		Non-album singles
"Float" (featuring Seun Kuti and Egypt 80)	2023	—	—	—	—	—	—	—	—	—	—		The Age of Pleasure
"Lipstick Lover"	2023	—	— (Note: "Lipstick Lover" did not enter the Hot R&B/Hip-Hop Songs chart but peaked at number 27 on the R&B/Hip-Hop Airplay chart.)	16	—	—	—	—	—	—	—		The Age of Pleasure
"—" denotes a recording that did not chart or was not released in that territory.

=== As featured artist ===
List of singles and peak chart positions
Title	Year	Peak chart positions										Certifications	Album
Title	Year	US	AUS	BEL (FL)	BEL (WA)	CAN	FRA	IRE	JPN	NZ	UK	Certifications	Album
"We Are Young" (fun. featuring Janelle Monáe)	2011	1	1	5	2	1	7	1	5	2	1	RIAA: Diamond; ARIA: 7× Platinum; BEA: Gold; BPI: 4× Platinum; MC: 7× Platinum; RIAJ: Gold; RMNZ: 6× Platinum; SNEP: Gold	Some Nights
"Special Education" (Goodie Mob featuring Janelle Monáe)	2013	—	—	—	—	—	—	—	—	—	—		Age Against the Machine
"Pressure Off" (Duran Duran featuring Janelle Monáe and Nile Rodgers)	2015	—	—	133	72	—	—	—	87	—	—		Paper Gods
"Sweet Life" (Jeezy featuring Janelle Monáe)	2015	—	—	—	—	—	—	—	—	—	—		Church In These Streets
"This Is for My Girls" (among Artists for Let Girls Learn)	2016	— (Note: "This Is for My Girls" did not enter the Billboard Hot 100, but peaked at number 5 on the Dance Club Songs chart.)	—	—	—	—	—	—	—	—	—		Non-album single
"—" denotes a recording that did not chart or was not released in that territory.

=== Promotional singles ===
Title	Year	Album
"Come Alive (The War of the Roses)"	2009	The ArchAndroid
"Shape of Things to Come"	2010	—N/a
"We Were Rock & Roll"	2013	The Electric Lady

== Other charted songs ==
Title	Year	Peak chart positions		Album
Title	Year	US R&B	NZ Heat.	Album
"Crazy, Classic, Life"	2018	—	9	Dirty Computer
"Champagne Shit" (solo or remix featuring Latto and Quavo)	2023	22	—	The Age of Pleasure

== Guest appearances ==
The following songs are not singles or promotional singles and have not appeared on an album by Janelle Monáe.

Title	Year	Other artists	Album
"My First Love"	2005	Jaspects	In "House" Sessions
"Time Will Reveal"	2005	Purple Ribbon All-Stars	Got Purp? Vol. 2
"Peachtree Blues"	2006	Jaspects	Broadcasting the Definition
"Call the Law"	2006	Outkast	Idlewild
"In Your Dreams"	2006	Outkast	Idlewild
"Nerd Girl"	2009	Chester French	Jacques Jams, Vol. 1: Endurance (mixtape)
"2012"	2009	Jaspects	The Polkadotted Stripe
"The Kids"	2010	B.o.B	B.o.B Presents: The Adventures of Bobby Ray
"Be Still"	2010	Big Boi	Sir Lucious Left Foot: The Son of Chico Dusty
"Our Riotous Defects"	2010	of Montreal	False Priest
"Enemy Gene"	2010	of Montreal	False Priest
"Without a Fight"	2010	None	For Colored Girls: Music From and Inspired by the Original Motion Picture Soundtrack
"Dance"	2011	Saul Williams	Volcanic Sunlight
"Do My Thing"	2012	Estelle	All of Me
"Fashion"	2014	Paolo Nutini	Caustic Love
"Visions of You"	2014	Sérgio Mendes	Magic
"Slip Slide"	2015	Donnie Trumpet & The Social Experiment	Surf
"Gabby"	2015	The Internet	Ego Death
"Venus Fly"	2015	Grimes	Art Angels
"Hum Along and Dance (Gotta Get Down)"	2016	None	The Get Down (Original Soundtrack from the Netflix Original Series)
"Isn't This the World"	2016	None	Hidden Figures: The Album
"Jalapeño"	2016	Pharrell Williams	Hidden Figures: The Album
"Safari"	2017	Jidenna, St. Beauty, Nana Kwabena	The Chief
"Whatthegirlmuthafuckinwannadoo"	2018	The Coup	Sorry to Bother You: The Soundtrack
"Out and Over/Sticky Sunrise"	2018	The Coup	Sorry to Bother You: The Soundtrack
"All Dolled Up"	2019	Kelly Clarkson	UglyDolls (Original Motion Picture Soundtrack)
"Unbreakable"	2019	Kelly Clarkson	UglyDolls (Original Motion Picture Soundtrack)
"He's a Tramp (2019)"	2019	—N/a	Lady and the Tramp (Original Soundtrack)

== Songwriting credits ==
List of songs written or co-written for other artists, showing year released and album name
Title	Year	Artist(s)	Album
"What a Shame"	2019	Nate "Rocket" Wonder, Roman GianArthur	Lady and the Tramp (Original Soundtrack)

== Music videos ==
List of music videos, showing year released and director
Title	Year	Director(s)
"Morris Brown" (Outkast featuring Scar, Sleepy Brown)	2006	Bryan Barber
"Many Moons"	2008	Alan Ferguson
"Tightrope" (featuring Big Boi)	2010	Wendy Morgan
"Tightrope (Wondamix)" (featuring B.o.B and Lupe Fiasco)	2010	Wendy Morgan
"Cold War"	2010	Wendy Morgan
"Be Still" (Big Boi featuring Janelle Monáe)	2011	—N/a
"We Are Young" (fun. featuring Janelle Monáe)	2011	Marc Klasfeld
"Q.U.E.E.N." (featuring Erykah Badu)	2013	Alan Ferguson
"Dance Apocalyptic"	2013	Wendy Morgan
"Special Education" (Goodie Mob featuring Janelle Monáe)	2013	John Colombo
"PrimeTime" (featuring Miguel)	2013	Alan Ferguson
"Heroes"	2014	The Young Astronauts
"Electric Lady"	2014	Alan Ferguson
"Yoga" (featuring Jidenna)	2015	Dave Meyers
"Pressure Off" (Duran Duran featuring Janelle Monáe)	2015	—N/a
"Venus Fly" (Grimes featuring Janelle Monáe)	2017	Grimes
"Make Me Feel"	2018	Alan Ferguson
"Django Jane"	2018	Andrew Donaho
"Pynk"	2018	Emma Westenberg
"I Like That"	2018	Lacey Duke
"Crazy, Classic, Life"	2018	Alan Ferguson
"Screwed"	2019	TBA
"Turntables"	2020	Child.
"Lipstick Lover"	2023	Janelle Monáe and Alan Ferguson
"Water Slide"	2023	Janelle Monáe and Alan Ferguson
