= Jidenna discography =

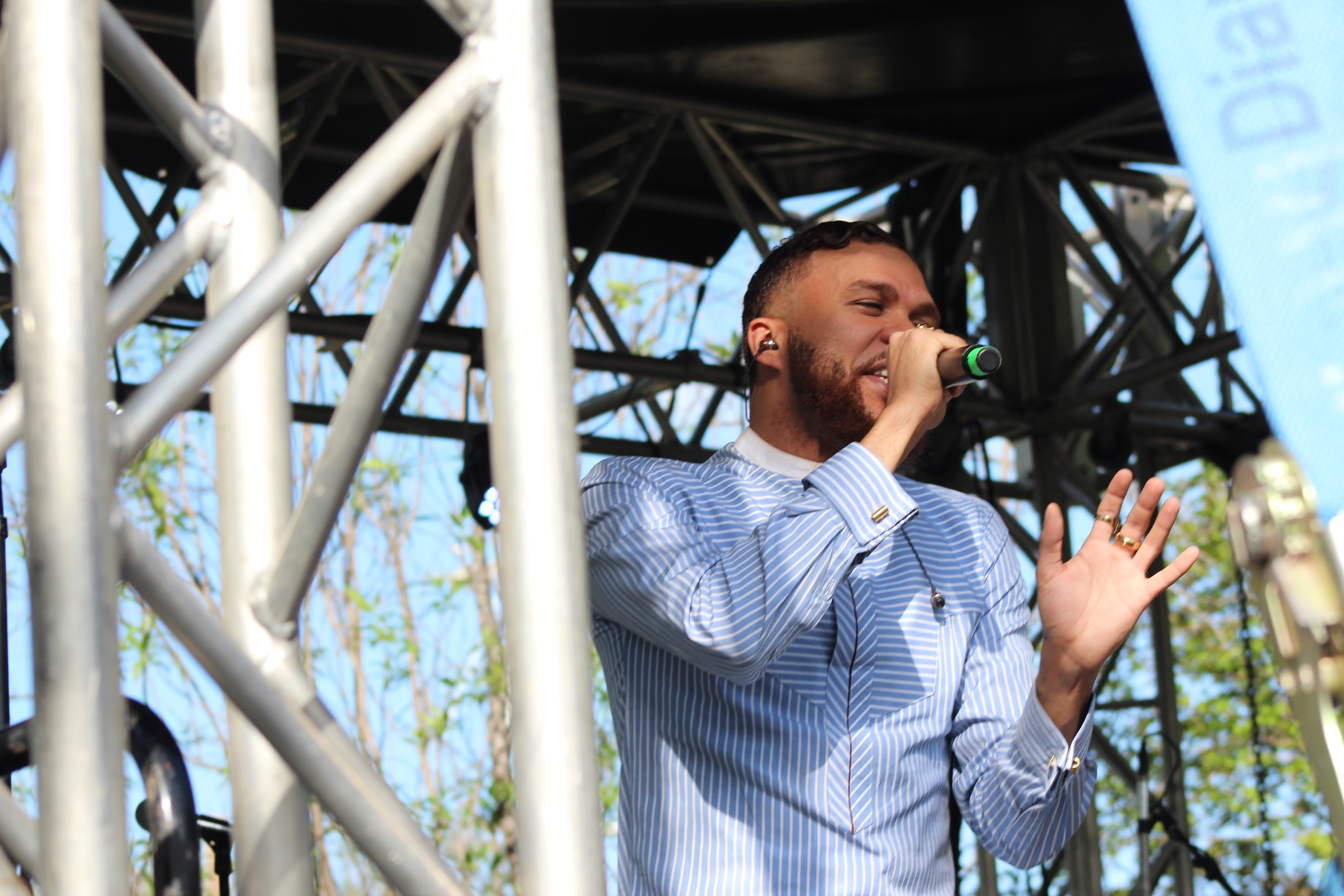
- Jidenna in 2017
- Studio albums: 3
- EPs: 2
- Singles: 12
- Music videos: 8

American rapper Jidenna has released three studio albums, two extended plays (EPs), and twelve singles.

== Studio albums ==
List of studio albums, with selected chart positions
Title	Album details	Peak chart positions				Sales
Title	Album details	US	US R&B/ HH	US Rap	CAN	Sales
The Chief	Released: February 17, 2017; Label: Wondaland, Epic; Formats: CD, Digital download, streaming	38	16	11	58	US: 8,387
85 to Africa	Released: August 23, 2019; Label: Wondaland, Epic; Formats: Digital download, streaming, vinyl	112	— (Note: 85 to Africa did not enter the Top R&B/Hip-Hop Albums chart, but peaked at number 11 on the R&B/Hip-Hop Album Sales chart.)	— (Note: 85 to Africa did not enter the Top Rap Albums chart, but peaked at number 10 on the Rap Album Sales chart.)	—	
Me You & God	Released: May 5, 2023; Label: Wondaland, Magic Chief Productions; Formats: Digital download, streaming	—	—	—	—	

== Extended plays ==
Title	EP details	Peak chart positions		
Title	EP details	US	US R&B/ HH	US Rap
Wondaland Presents: The Eephus	Released: August 14, 2015; Label: Wondaland, Epic, Sony; Format: CD, Digital download, streaming, vinyl	22	5	—
Boomerang	Released: November 10, 2017; Label: Wondaland, Epic; Format: Digital download, streaming	—	— (Note: Boomerang did not enter the Top R&B/Hip-Hop Albums chart, but peaked at number 37 on the R&B/Hip-Hop Album Sales chart.)	— (Note: Boomerang did not enter the Top Rap Albums chart, but peaked at number 22 on the Rap Album Sales chart.)

== Singles ==
List of singles, with selected chart positions and certifications, showing year released and album name
Title	Year	Peak chart positions								Certifications	Album
Title	Year	US	US R&B/ HH	US R&B	US Rap	BEL (FL)	CAN	FRA	UK	Certifications	Album
"Classic Man" (featuring Roman GianArthur)	2015	22	9	6	—	44	59	142	174	RIAA: 2× Platinum	Wondaland Presents: The Eephus
"Yoga" (with Janelle Monáe)	2015	79	31	11	—	—	—	—	—	RIAA: Gold	Wondaland Presents: The Eephus
"Long Live the Chief"	2015	— (Note: "Long Live the Chief" did not enter the Billboard Hot 100, but peaked at number 10 on the Bubbling Under Hot 100 Singles chart.)	48	—	—	—	—	—	—		The Chief
"Knickers"	2015	—	—	—	—	—	—	—	—		—N/a
"Extraordinaire"	2015	—	—	—	—	—	—	—	—		—N/a
"Chief Don't Run" (featuring Roman GianArthur)	2016	—	—	—	—	—	—	—	—		The Chief
"Little Bit More"	2016	—	— (Note: "Little Bit More" did not enter the Billboard Hot R&B/Hip-Hop Songs chart, but peaked at number 40 on the Mainstream R&B/Hip-Hop chart, which is an airplay only component.)	—	— (Note: "Little Bit More" did not enter the Billboard Hot Rap Songs chart, but peaked at number 50 on the Rap Digital Songs Sales chart.)	—	—	—	—		The Chief
"The Let Out" (featuring Quavo)	2017	—	—	—	—	—	—	—	—		The Chief
"Bambi"	2017	—	—	—	—	—	—	—	—		The Chief
"Tribe"	2019	—	—	—	—	—	—	—	—		85 to Africa
"Sufi Woman"	2019	—	—	—	—	—	—	—	—		85 to Africa
"Zodi" (featuring Mr Eazi)	2019	—	—	—	—	—	—	—	—		85 to Africa
"Sou Sou"	2019	—	—	—	—	—	—	—	—		85 to Africa
"Black Magic Hour"	2020	—	—	—	—	—	—	—	—		African On All Sides
"—" denotes a recording that did not chart or was not released in that territory.

== Music videos ==
Year	Title	Ref	Director
2015	"Classic Man" (featuring Roman GianArthur)		Alan Ferguson
2015	"Yoga" (with Janelle Monáe)		Dave Meyers
2015	"Classic Man (Remix)" (featuring Kendrick Lamar)		Benny Boom
2016	"Long Live the Chief"		Benny Boom
2016	"Knickers"		Benny Boom
2016	"Chief Don't Run"		Benny Boom
2016	"Little Bit More"		Benny Boom
2017	"The Let Out" (featuring Nana Kwabena)		Benny Boom
2019	"Tribe"		
2019	"Worth the Weight"		
2019	"Sufi Woman"		
