= Hell You Talmbout =

Song by Janelle Monáe

Single by Janelle Monáe and various artists
- Released: August 13, 2015
- Recorded: 2015
- Genre: Gospel
- Length: 6:41
- Label: Wondaland
- Songwriters: Janelle Robinson; Nate Wonder; Charles Joseph II; Jidenna Mobisson; Roman GianArthur; Alexe Belle; Isis Valentino; George 2.0

Janelle Monáe singles chronology
"Yoga" (2015)	"Hell You Talmbout" (2015)	"Pressure Off" (2015)

Jidenna singles chronology
"Yoga" (2015)	"Hell You Talmbout" (2015)	"Long Live the Chief" (2015)

Roman GianArthur singles chronology
"Classic Man" (2015)	"Hell You Talmbout'" (2015)

Deep Cotton singles chronology
"We're Far Enough from Heaven Now We Can Freak Out" (2012)	"Hell You Talmbout'" (2015)

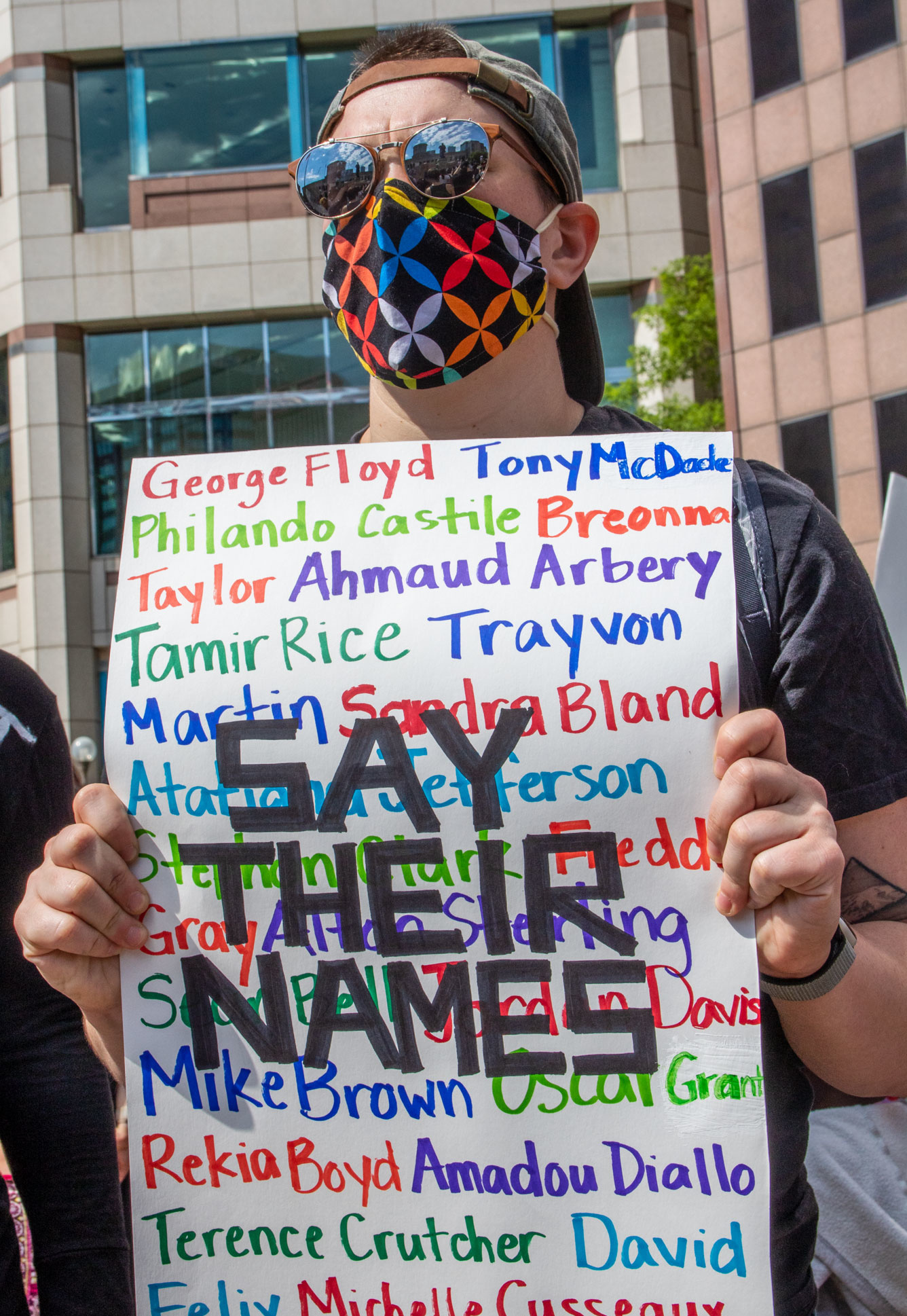
George Floyd protest, May 30, 2020

"Hell You Talmbout" (Note: The word "talmbout" is a contraction of "talking about".) is a 2015 protest song by Janelle Monáe and the members of her Wondaland artist collective, including Deep Cotton, George 2.0, Jidenna, Roman GianArthur, and St. Beauty.

The song lists the names of various African American people who died as a result of encounters with law enforcement or racial violence, and implores listeners to say the names of the dead. Wondaland and Monáe subsequently released the instrumental track of the song, so that listeners could make their own versions.

== Names mentioned ==
- Walter Scott
- Jerame Reid
- Phillip White
- Eric Garner
- Trayvon Martin
- Sean Bell
- Freddie Gray
- Aiyana Jones
- Sandra Bland
- Kimani Gray
- John Crawford
- Michael Brown
- Miriam Carey
- Sharonda Singleton
- Emmett Till
- Tommy Junior Yancy
- Jordan Baker
- Amadou Diallo

== Reception ==
The song received favourable reviews, and many spoke positively about the message of the song. Fast Company described it as "simple yet unquestionably powerful", stating that it will force listeners to remember those who have been murdered. Stereogum called it "less a song and more of a chant, with some gospel overtones", and emphasized that it is both "simple" and "effective". USA Today declared it the "song of the week", praising the song's "simple but stark approach" of only listing names rather than describing circumstances, and attributing this to a desire to avoid "arguments that can quickly turn divisive and bitter", while National Public Radio called it "visceral" and "blistering".

Malcolm Gladwell's audiobook Talking to Strangers, a reflection on the psychology surrounding the arrest and death of Sandra Bland, uses "Hell You Talmbout" as a theme song: "I was almost finished with my book when I first heard [Hell You Talmbout], and I thought, 'I cannot publish Talking to Strangers without it.'"

== Other versions ==
- Transgender rights advocate Vita Elizabeth Cleveland recorded an answer song, "Hell Y'all Ain't Talmbout", which focuses on the names of murdered African-American trans women.
- David Byrne and his band performed "Hell You Talmbout" as the final encore each night on his American Utopia Tour. Byrne said, "This is one of the most moving political songs that I'd ever heard" and chose it because it "...ends the show on the vibe of, 'This is where we are at in 2018.'" A version of it appears on the American Utopia on Broadway album, as well as the Spike Lee-directed film of the concert, during which, several family members of the deceased mentioned hold up photographs of them. During the applause, additional tributes are shown to those who have lost their lives since the song came out, prominently Ahmaud Arbery, Breonna Taylor, and George Floyd, as well as additional tributes to those not mentioned in the song "and too many more". Floyd and Taylor's names were added when the show returned to Broadway in 2021.
- In late September 2021, Monáe released a 17-minute version of the song entitled "Say Her Name (Hell You Talmbout)". The updated version featured the names of 61 Black women and girls who were murdered at the hands of police brutality. Among the vocalists that contributed to the new version the song are Beyoncé Knowles, Alicia Keys, Tierra Whack, Zoë Kravitz, Brittany Howard and Chloe x Halle.
