= American Utopia (film) =

2020 film by Spike Lee

- Official poster
- Directed by: Spike Lee
- Written by: David Byrne
- Produced by: Spike Lee; David Byrne
- Starring: David Byrne
- Cinematography: Ellen Kuras
- Edited by: Adam Gough
- Music by: David Byrne
- Production companies: HBO Films; Participant; River Road Entertainment; Warner Music Entertainment; 40 Acres and a Mule Filmworks; RadicalMedia; Todomundo
- Distributed by: HBO (United States); Universal Pictures (International)
- Release dates: September 10, 2020 (Toronto); October 17, 2020
- Running time: 105 minutes
- Country: United States
- Language: English
- Box office: $275,304

American Utopia is a 2020 American concert film directed and produced by Spike Lee, from a screenplay by American musician David Byrne. The film is a live recording of a Broadway performance of the show adapted from the touring show that supported the album of the same name. The film features selections from that album, as well as songs from throughout Byrne's career. Byrne performed alongside eleven musicians, all of whom used wireless or portable equipment. Frequent collaborator Annie-B Parson served as choreographer.

It had its world premiere at the 2020 Toronto International Film Festival on September 10, 2020. The film received critical acclaim.

== Cast ==
All provide percussion; all except Byrne provide backing vocals.

- David Byrne – lead vocals, electric and acoustic guitars
- Chris Giarmo – dancing, melodica
- Tendayi Kuumba – dancing
- Karl Mansfield – keyboards, musical director
- Angie Swan – electric guitar
- Bobby Wooten III – bass
- Mauro Refosco – drums, musical director
- Tim Keiper – drums
- Gustavo Di Dalva – drums
- Jacquelene Acevedo – drums
- Daniel Freedman – drums
- Stephane San Juan – drums

== Songs ==
- "Here" (from American Utopia)
- "I Know Sometimes a Man Is Wrong" (from Rei Momo)
- "Don't Worry About the Government" (from Talking Heads: 77)
- "Lazy" (from Muzikizum by X-Press 2)
- "This Must Be the Place (Naive Melody)" (from Speaking in Tongues)
- "I Zimbra" (from Fear of Music)
- "Slippery People" (from Speaking in Tongues)
- "I Should Watch TV" (from Love This Giant)
- "Everybody's Coming to My House" (from American Utopia)
- "Once in a Lifetime" (from Remain in Light)
- "Glass, Concrete & Stone" (from Grown Backwards)
- "Toe Jam" (from I Think We're Gonna Need a Bigger Boat by The Brighton Port Authority)
- "Born Under Punches (The Heat Goes On)" (from Remain in Light)
- "I Dance Like This" (from American Utopia)
- "Bullet" (from American Utopia)
- "Every Day Is a Miracle" (from American Utopia)
- "Blind" (from Naked)
- "Burning Down the House" (from Speaking in Tongues)
- "Hell You Talmbout" (by Janelle Monáe)
- "One Fine Day" (from Everything That Happens Will Happen Today)
- "Road to Nowhere" (from Little Creatures)
- "Everybody's Coming to My House: Detroit" (end credits, sung by the Detroit School of Arts Vocal Jazz choir)

== Production ==
In June 2020, it was announced Spike Lee had directed a filmed version of the Broadway performance American Utopia by David Byrne, with HBO distributing.

Cinematographers Ellen Kuras and Declan Quinn used Sony Venice digital cameras to capture the performance.

== Release ==
American Utopia had its world premiere at the 2020 Toronto International Film Festival on September 10, 2020. It screened at the New York Film Festival on October 3, 2020, and the BFI London Film Festival on October 14, 2020. It was broadcast in the United States and Canada on HBO and made available for streaming through HBO Max (U.S.) and Crave (Canada) on October 17, 2020. Universal Pictures distributed the film in all other countries. The film received a limited theatrical release in the United States throughout September 2021. The film was released on 4K Ultra HD, Blu-ray, and DVD by The Criterion Collection on December 16, 2025.

=== Album ===
American Utopia on Broadway

Soundtrack album by David Byrne
- Released: October 18, 2019
- Length: 1:30:42
- Label: Todo Mundo

David Byrne chronology
American Utopia (2018)	American Utopia on Broadway (2019)	Who Is the Sky? (2025)

The movie was accompanied by a soundtrack album that featured the same songs as the movie, but instead of having "Everybody's Coming to My House: Detroit", the album has a bonus track of a live recording of "The Great Curve" from Talking Head's album Remain in Light (1980).

==== Track listing ====
All tracks are written by David Byrne, except where noted.

Disc one
No.	Title	Writer(s)	Length
1.	"Here"	Byrne; Daniel Lopatin	4:19
2.	"I Know Sometimes a Man Is Wrong" / "Don't Worry About the Government"		4:27
3.	"Lazy"	X-Press 2; Byrne	4:34
4.	"This Must Be the Place (Naïve Melody)"	Byrne; Chris Frantz; Jerry Harrison; Tina Weymouth	4:56
5.	"I Zimbra"	Byrne; Brian Eno; Hugo Ball	3:08
6.	"Slippery People"	Byrne; Frantz; Harrison; Weymouth	4:49
7.	"I Should Watch TV"	Byrne; Annie Clark	3:16
8.	"Everybody's Coming to My House"		3:46
9.	"Once in a Lifetime"	Byrne; Eno; Frantz; Harrison; Weymouth	5:34
10.	"Glass, Concrete & Stone"		3:12
Total length:			42:01

Disc two
No.	Title	Writer(s)	Length
1.	"Toe Jam"	Byrne; Dylan Mills	3:39
2.	"Born Under Punches (The Heat Goes On)"	Byrne; Eno	5:01
3.	"I Dance Like This"	Byrne; Eno	3:59
4.	"Bullet"	Byrne; Eno	3:31
5.	"Every Day Is a Miracle"	Byrne; Eno	4:55
6.	"Blind"	Frantz; Harrison; Weymouth	5:11
7.	"Burning Down the House"	Byrne; Frantz; Harrison; Weymouth	4:16
8.	"Hell You Talmbout"	Janelle Robinson; Nate Wonder; Charles Joseph II; Jidenna Mobisson; Roman GianArthur; Alexe Belle; Isis Valentino; George 2.0	4:16
9.	"One Fine Day"		3:36
10.	"Road to Nowhere"		4:31
11.	"The Great Curve" (Bonus Track)	Byrne; Eno; Frantz; Harrison; Weymouth	5:46
Total length:			48:41

== Reception ==
American Utopia received critical acclaim. It holds a 98% approval rating on review aggregator website Rotten Tomatoes, based on 135 reviews, with an average of 8.6/10. The site's critical consensus reads, "Helmed in elegant and exhilarating style by Spike Lee, David Byrne's American Utopia is a concert film that doubles as a joyously cathartic celebration." On Metacritic, the film holds a rating of 92 out of 100, based on 28 critics, indicating "universal acclaim".

Erik Adams of The A.V. Club devotes a lengthy review to American Utopia as "the right movie for 2020", noting how Byrne balances hope in a tumultuous world, writing, "The key to American Utopia's resonance isn’t so much one of joy versus despair as it is connection versus isolation".

=== Accolades ===
Award	Date of ceremony	Category	Recipient(s)	Result	Ref.
Chicago Film Critics Association Awards	December 21, 2020	Best Documentary Film	David Byrne and Spike Lee	Nominated	
Florida Film Critics Circle Awards	December 21, 2020	Best Documentary Film	American Utopia	Nominated	
San Diego Film Critics Society Awards	January 11, 2021	Best Use of Music	American Utopia	Runner-up	
Toronto Film Critics Association Awards	February 7, 2021	Allan King Documentary Award	Spike Lee	Runner-up	
Grammy Awards	March 14, 2021	Best Musical Theater Album	American Utopia on Broadway	Nominated	
Directors Guild of America Award	April 10, 2021	Outstanding Directorial Achievement in Variety/Talk/News/Sports – Specials	Spike Lee	Nominated	
American Cinema Editors Eddie Awards	April 17, 2021	Best Edited Variety Talk/Sketch Show or Special	Adam Gough	Won	
Primetime Emmy Awards	September 19, 2021	Outstanding Variety Special (Pre-Recorded)	Jeff Skoll, David Linde, Diane Weyermann, Len Blavatnik, David Bither, Charlie Cohen, Kurt Deutsch, Bill Pohlad, Christa Zofcin Workman, Jon Kamen, Dave Sirulnick, Meredith Bennett, Kristin Caskey, Mike Isaacson, Patrick Catullo, Sue Naegle, Alec Sash, David Byrne and Spike Lee	Nominated	
Primetime Emmy Awards	September 11 and 12, 2021	Outstanding Directing for a Variety Special	Spike Lee	Nominated	
Primetime Emmy Awards	September 11 and 12, 2021	Outstanding Lighting Design/Lighting Direction for a Variety Special	Rob Sinclair and Brian Spett	Won	
Primetime Emmy Awards	September 11 and 12, 2021	Outstanding Music Direction	Karl Mansfield	Nominated	
Primetime Emmy Awards	September 11 and 12, 2021	Outstanding Sound Mixing for a Variety Series or Special	Paul Hsu, Pete Keppler and Michael Lonsdale	Won	
Primetime Emmy Awards	September 11 and 12, 2021	Outstanding Technical Direction, Camerawork, Video Control for a Special	Peter Agliata, Kerwin DeVonish, Tim Ives, Ellen Kuras, Sam Levy, Charles Libin, Declan Quinn, Yousheng Tang, Gregor Tavenner and David Waterston	Nominated	
Tony Awards	September 26, 2021	Special Tony Award	American Utopia	Won	
Grammy Awards	January 31, 2022	Best Music Film	American Utopia	Nominated	
