= 2015 Soul Train Music Awards =

Music awards ceremony in Las Vegas, US

Soul Train Music Awards
- Date: November 29, 2015
- Location: Orleans Arena, Las Vegas, Nevada
- Country: United States
- Hosted by: Erykah Badu
- Most awards: The Weeknd, Mark Ronson and Bruno Mars (2)
- Website: soultrain.com

Television/radio coverage
- Network: BET, Centric

The 2015 Soul Train Music Awards was held at the Orleans Arena in Las Vegas, Nevada, on Centric and BET on November 29, 2015. Jill Scott was honored with Soul Train Awards' first ever Lady of Soul Award. The ceremony, hosted by Erykah Badu, honored artists in 12 different categories. American singer, songwriter and poet Jill Scott was honored with the Lady of Soul Award for her contributions to the music industry.

== Special awards ==
=== Legend Award ===
- Babyface

=== Lady of Soul Award ===
- Jill Scott

== Winners and nominees ==
Winners are listed first and highlighted in bold.

=== Album of the Year ===
- **The Weeknd – Beauty Behind the Madness**
  - Chris Brown – X
  - D'Angelo and the Vanguard – Black Messiah
  - Jill Scott – Woman
  - Tyrese – Black Rose

=== Song of the Year ===
- **Mark Ronson (featuring Bruno Mars) – "Uptown Funk"**
  - Common and John Legend – "Glory"
  - Jidenna and Roman GianArthur – "Classic Man"
  - Rihanna – "B**** Better Have My Money"
  - The Weeknd – "Earned It"

=== Video of the Year ===
- **Mark Ronson (featuring Bruno Mars) – "Uptown Funk"**
  - Beyoncé – "7/11"
  - Jidenna and Roman GianArthur – "Classic Man"
  - Kendrick Lamar – "Alright"
  - The Weeknd – "Earned It (Fifty Shades of Grey)"

=== The Ashford & Simpson Songwriter's Award ===
- **Common and John Legend – "Glory"**
  - **Written by: Lonnie Lynn, John Stephens and Che Smith**
- J. Cole – "Apparently"
  - Written by: Jermaine Cole, Damon Coleman and Filippo Trecca
- Mark Ronson (featuring Bruno Mars) – "Uptown Funk"
  - Written by: Mark Ronson, Rudolph Taylor, Lonnie Simmons, Philip Lawrence, Peter Hernandez, Jeff Bhasker, Nicholas Williams, Devon Gallaspy, Robert Wilson, Charles Wilson and Ronnie Wilson
- The Weeknd – "Earned It (Fifty Shades of Grey)"
  - Written by: Abel Tesfaye, Ahmad Balshe, Jason Quenneville and Stephan Moccio
- Tyrese – "Shame"
  - Written by: Tyrese Gibson, Warryn Campbell, Sam Dees, Ron Kersey and DJ Rogers, Jr.

=== Best R&B/Soul Male Artist ===
- **The Weeknd**
  - Chris Brown
  - D'Angelo and the Vanguard
  - Tyrese
  - Trey Songz

=== Best R&B/Soul Female Artist ===
- **Jill Scott**
  - Beyoncé
  - Tamar Braxton
  - Janet Jackson
  - Janelle Monáe

=== Best New Artist ===
- **Jidenna**
  - Alessia Cara
  - Dej Loaf
  - Jussie Smollett
  - Tinashe

=== Centric Certified Award ===
- **Tyrese**
  - Avant
  - Vivian Green
  - The Internet
  - Chrisette Michele

=== Best Gospel/Inspirational Song ===
- **Lecrae – "All I Need is You"**
  - Erica Campbell – "More Love"
  - Fred Hammond and BreeAnn Hammond – "I Will Trust"
  - Kirk Franklin – "Wanna Be Happy?"
  - Marvin Sapp – "Yes You Can"

=== Best Hip-Hop Song of the Year ===
- **Kendrick Lamar – "Alright"**
  - Big Sean (featuring Drake and Kanye West) – "Blessing"
  - Big Sean (featuring E-40) – "IDFWU"
  - Fetty Wap – "Trap Queen"
  - Nicki Minaj (featuring Drake and Lil Wayne) – "Truffle Butter"

=== Best Dance Performance ===
- **Silentó – "Watch Me (Whip/Nae Nae)"**
  - Beyoncé – "7/11"
  - Chris Brown and Tyga – "Ayo"
  - Janelle Monáe and Jidenna – "Yoga"
  - Mark Ronson (featuring Bruno Mars) – "Uptown Funk"

=== Best Collaboration ===
- **Omarion (featuring Jhené Aiko and Chris Brown) – "Post to Be"**
  - Big Sean (featuring Drake and Kanye West) – "Blessing"
  - Common and John Legend – "Glory"
  - Mark Ronson (featuring Bruno Mars) – "Uptown Funk"
  - Nicki Minaj (featuring Beyoncé) – "Feeling Myself"
