= The Age of Pleasure =

Studio album by Janelle Monáe
- Released: June 9, 2023
- Genre: Afrobeat; reggae; soul
- Length: 31:59
- Label: Wondaland; Bad Boy; Atlantic
- Producer: Roman GianArthur; Nana Kwabena; Janelle Monáe; Sensei Bueno; Nate Wonder

Janelle Monáe chronology
Dirty Computer (2018)	The Age of Pleasure (2023)

Singles from The Age of Pleasure
- 1. "Float" Released: February 16, 2023; 2. "Lipstick Lover" Released: May 11, 2023; 3. "Water Slide" Released: July 7, 2023

The Age of Pleasure is the fourth studio album by American musician Janelle Monáe. It was released on June 9, 2023, through Atlantic Records, being the singer's first studio album in over five years, since Dirty Computer (2018). The album was preceded by two singles: "Float" featuring Seun Kuti and Egypt 80 in February 2023 and "Lipstick Lover" in May. The album was announced alongside the issue of the second single, which Monáe first previewed at their Met Gala after-party.

Upon release, The Age of Pleasure received positive reviews from critics, who praised its joyful mood and Afrobeat and reggae inspired sounds, though it was criticized by some as inferior to Monáe's previous records. It debuted at number 17 on the Billboard 200 while charting modestly in several other countries. The month following, the single "Water Slide" was released. In support of the album, Monáe embarked on the Age of Pleasure Tour, beginning in August 2023.

At the 66th Annual Grammy Awards, the album received nominations for Album of the Year and Best Progressive R&B Album.

== Background and recording ==
In a May 2023 interview with Zane Lowe, Monáe explained that the songs "were written from such an honest space" and they hoped listeners "feel that when they listen to the music", as they feel they have "had an opportunity to evolve and grow and to tap into the things that bring [them] pleasure". Monáe worked on the songs and played them at parties, including their Met Gala after-party, to see how their friends would respond to the music, and told Lowe that their thought process was, "If the songs can't work at the party, they're not going on the album". They explained that they wanted the album to be "so specific to this Pan-African crowd who are my friends. I want it to be a love letter to the diaspora. And if they fuck with it, it's good. I'm great."

== Critical reception ==
Professional ratings
Aggregate scores
Source	Rating
AnyDecentMusic?	7.3/10
Metacritic	78/100
Review scores
Source	Rating
AllMusic	4/5 stars
And It Don't Stop	A−
The Guardian	3/5 stars
The Independent	4/5 stars
The Irish Times	4/5 stars
The Line of Best Fit	6/10
NME	4/5 stars
Pitchfork	7.6/10
Slant Magazine	3.5/5 stars
The Telegraph	4/5 stars

The Age of Pleasure received a score of 78 out of 100 on review aggregator Metacritic based on 18 critics' reviews, indicating "generally favorable" reception. Erica Campbell of NME called the album "liberating" as well as "an Afrobeats and disco-laced 14-track joy ride" that "positions the pursuit of unabashed delight at its centre", on which Monáe is "truly ready to share and celebrate her queer, Black experience with the world". The Independent's Adam White felt that Monáe "trades sci-fi mythologising for carnally-minded joy" on The Age of Pleasure, which he described as "a sex record, a frothy, horny ode to erotic delight that breezes past in a carnal blur".

Reviewing the album for AllMusic, Andy Kellman described it as being, "threaded with interpolations and samples of numerous reggae classics. It still sounds just like a Wondaland production -- soulful, left-of-center pop that is ornate and tasteful, brimming with ideas from subtly dazzling vocal arrangements to crafty song transitions. The material follows through on the title, celebrating an ideal for sybaritic living whether alone, with a partner, or with partners."

Alexis Petridis of The Guardian named it his album of the week and remarked that Monáe "blends Afrobeat, reggae and laidback soul into a hazily intoxicating cocktail of sex and partying". While he found that it "doesn't always work [...] When it does work, however, it's fantastic". Sam Franzini, reviewing the album for The Line of Best Fit, commented that the album "has no pretenses; there's no required reading to do before listening" and called "Float" a "braggadocious soul number filled with horns" and "Lipstick Lover" an "unabashedly queer, reggae jam ready for summertime". Franzini opined that while it "feels like the freest Monáe has been", "this feeling is drawn through in songs that, really, are lackluster and don't aim to surprise" as its "songs struggle to connect to any broader meaning" and "Monáe's writing here is unusually one-dimensional".

Charles Lyons-Burt of Slant Magazine called it "ironic that the first album where Monáe has completely freed herself of the messianic android character that she embodied throughout The Archandroid and The Electric Lady is the one on which she sounds the most inhuman" as they adopt a "droll deadpan with which she conveys her swagger" that makes them come off as "surprisingly joyless" on several tracks. Lyons-Burt still complimented its "energy" as compared to their other longer works and called it their "hookiest, most pop-forward album". Okla Jones of ESSENCE wrote about the change in Monáe's sound, saying, "In what has become a dynamic shift from earlier records, Monáe has blended together the genres of Afrobeats, pop, R&B, reggae and soul to create an anthem for liberation, sexuality, and self-love with The Age of Pleasure."

Heven Haile of Pitchfork described the album as a "rapturous Afrofuturistic sound collage for sunny days and sticky nights" and commented that "Monáe flourishes in a Pan-African utopia" that, while not "as intricate as their sci-fi novellas or as electrifyingly innovative as The ArchAndroid", is "a bacchanal in the haven Monáe constructed for themself". Neil McCormick of The Telegraph wrote that "Nothing feels overdone or excessive" and called Monáe "an artful orchestrator of bands and guest stars [who] employs an impressive guest list of collaborators with care". He felt that if there is one caveat, it is that it "lacks the dizzying splendour of Monae's earlier epics. But on its own down and dirty terms, The Age of Pleasure is sheer pleasure".

Veteran critic Robert Christgau cautioned listeners not to make the mistake of overlooking the lyrics amidst Monáe's musicality, while summing up her achievement with the idea that she "bets her iconicity on her pan‑sexuality and comes out on top of a crowded field that includes Megan the Stallion, SZA, and Amaarae". He also singled out "Water Slide" as a "secret classic".

== Accolades ==
Awards and nominations for The Age of Pleasure
Organization	Year	Category	Result	Ref.
Soul Train Music Awards	2023	Album of the Year	Nominated	
Grammy Awards	2024	Album of the Year	Nominated	
Grammy Awards	2024	Best Progressive R&B Album	Nominated	
NAACP Image Awards	2024	Outstanding Album	Nominated	

== Track listing ==
The Age of Pleasure track listing
No.	Title	Lyrics	Music	Producer(s)	Length
1.	"Float" (featuring Seun Kuti and Egypt 80)	Janelle Robinson	Jarrett Goodly; Nathaniel Irvin III; Nana Kwabena Tuffuor	Nate Wonder; Nana Kwabena; Sensei Bueno	4:02
2.	"Champagne Shit"	Robinson; Barrington Levy	Robinson; Goodly; N. Irvin; Tuffuor	Janelle Monáe; N. Wonder; Kwabena^{[a]}; Sensei Bueno^{[a]}	2:23
3.	"Black Sugar Beach"	Robinson; Levy	Robinson; Goodly; N. Irvin; Roman Irvin; Tuffuor	Monáe; N. Wonder; Kwabena; Sensei Bueno; Roman GianArthur	1:05
4.	"Phenomenal" (featuring Doechii)	Robinson; Jaylah Hickmon	Goodly; N. Irvin; R. Irvin; Tuffuor	N. Wonder; Kwabena; Sensei Bueno; Monáe^{[a]}; GianArthur^{[a]}; Doechii^{[a]}	3:37
5.	"Haute"	Robinson	Robinson; Goodly; N. Irvin; Tuffuor	Monáe; N. Wonder; Kwabena; Sensei Bueno	1:36
6.	"Ooh La La" (featuring Grace Jones)	Grace Jones	Robinson; Goodly; N. Irvin; Tuffuor	N. Wonder; Sensei Bueno; Kwabena^{[a]}	0:35
7.	"Lipstick Lover"	Robinson	Robinson; Ewart E. Brown; Clifton Dillon; Sly Dunbar; Richard Foulks; Brian Gold; Goodly; Herbert Harris; Leroy Romans; Handel Tucker; Tuffuor; N. Irvin; Stevie Wonder	Monáe; N. Wonder; Kwabena; Sensei Bueno	2:49
8.	"The Rush" (featuring Amaarae and Nia Long)	Robinson; Ama Genfi	Robinson; Goodly; N. Irvin; Tuffuor	Monáe; N. Wonder; Kwabena; Sensei Bueno	2:43
9.	"The French 75" (featuring Sister Nancy)	Ophlin Russell; Stephanie Silva	Robinson; Goodly; N. Irvin; R. Irvin; Tuffuor	Monáe; N. Wonder; Sensei Bueno; Kwabena^{[a]}; GianArthur^{[a]}	1:09
10.	"Water Slide"	Robinson; Taylor Parks	Robinson; Goodly; N. Irvin; Anthony Kelly; Winston Riley; Romans; Russell; Dorothy Smith; Tuffuor; Emelie Walcott	Monáe; N. Wonder; Kwabena; Sensei Bueno^{[a]}	2:44
11.	"Know Better" (featuring CKay, Seun Kuti & Egypt 80)	Robinson; Chukwuka Ekweani	Robinson; N. Irvin; Michael McEwan	Monáe; N. Wonder	2:49
12.	"Paid in Pleasure"	Robinson	Robinson; Goodly; N. Irvin; Tuffuor; Walcott	Monáe; N. Wonder; Kwabena; Sensei Bueno; Kel-P^{[a]}	1:46
13.	"Only Have Eyes 42"	Robinson; Derrick Harriott	Robinson; Goodly; N. Irvin; Tuffuor; Walcott	Monáe; Kwabena; Sensei Bueno^{[c]}; N. Wonder^{[c]}	2:50
14.	"A Dry Red"	Robinson	Robinson; Goodly; N. Irvin; Tuffuor	N. Wonder; Sensei Bueno; Monáe^{[c]}	1:51
Total length:					31:59

Notes

- ^{^[c]} signifies a co-producer
- ^{^[a]} signifies an additional producer

== Personnel ==
Musicians

- Janelle Monáe – lead vocals
- Nana Kwabena – percussion (1, 2, 5–8, 12, 13), programming (1–7, 10, 12), drums (2, 4–6, 8, 10, 12, 13), sound effects (5–8, 10, 13)
- Nate Wonder – background vocals (1, 7, 8), bass guitar (1, 7, 9), flute (1, 5, 6, 14), guitar (1–8, 10–12), sounds (1), drums (2–6, 8, 9, 11, 14), organ (2, 3, 5, 6, 10–12), percussion (2–6, 8, 9, 11, 14), synthesizer (2, 4, 5, 10, 12), sound effects (3, 6–8), horns (4), vibraphone (8), saxophone (10), keyboards (12); strings, woodwinds (14)
- Sensei Bueno – bass guitar (1–8, 12, 13), guitar (1–8, 14), synthesizer (4, 9), drums (5, 6), solo guitar (10)
- Seun Kuti – solo horn (1), horns (1–3, 11)
- Egypt 80 – horns (1–3, 11)
- Roman GianArthur – guitar (2–6)
- Hornz Unlimited – horns (2, 3, 9)
- Cal Bennett – additional horns (2, 3)
- Dennis Mitcheltree – additional horns (2, 3)
- Erm Navarro – additional horns (2, 3)
- Sean Billings – additional horns (2, 3)
- Serafin Aguilar – additional horns (2, 3)
- Dominique Sanders – bass guitar (4)
- Taron Lockett – drums (4)
- Cory Henry – horns (4)
- Precious Basquiat – sound effects (4)
- Kylah Moscovich – trumpet (4)
- Meredith "Ezi" Ezinma – strings (5, 6, 13)
- Kel-P – programming (12)

Arrangements

- Nate Wonder – horns arrangement (1, 3–5, 7, 9–12), arrangement (2, 3, 7, 13), additional arrangement (4), string arrangement (5, 6), woodwind arrangement (14)
- Nana Kwabena – arrangement (1, 4, 12, 13), additional arrangement (2, 3, 5, 6, 9, 10)
- Sensei Bueno – additional arrangement (2, 5, 6, 10), arrangement (3, 4), horns arrangement (4)
- Janelle Monáe – arrangement (3, 8), vocal arrangement (5, 11–13)
- Roman GianArthur – additional arrangement (4, 11, 12)
- Chuck Lightning – additional arrangement (4), arrangement (6)
- Meme Dock – additional arrangement (7, 8, 13)
- Amaarae – additional arrangement (8)
- Kayla Dock – additional arrangement (13)

Technical

- Dave Kutch – mastering
- Mick Guzauski – mixing
- Fabian Marasciullo – mixing (2, 7)
- Janelle Monáe – engineering, executive production
- Nate Wonder – engineering, executive production
- Jayda Love – engineering (1, 2, 4–14)
- Yáng Tan – engineering
- Chuck Lightning – executive production
- Sean "Diddy" Combs – executive production

== Charts ==
Chart performance for The Age of Pleasure
Chart (2023)	Peak position
Australian Vinyl Albums (ARIA)	9
Belgian Albums (Ultratop Flanders)	68
Belgian Albums (Ultratop Wallonia)	61
Canadian Albums (Billboard)	79
Dutch Albums (Album Top 100)	93
French Albums (SNEP)	130
German Albums (Offizielle Top 100)	48
New Zealand Albums (RMNZ)	38
Scottish Albums (OCC)	17
Swiss Albums (Schweizer Hitparade)	37
UK Albums (OCC)	49
UK R&B Albums (OCC)	2
US Billboard 200	17
US Top R&B/Hip-Hop Albums (Billboard)	5
