= 85 to Africa =

Studio album by Jidenna
- Released: August 23, 2019
- Genre: Hip hop; highlife; afrobeats; afro fusion
- Length: 41:08
- Label: Wondaland; Epic
- Producer: 7G; Christian Gregory; Curtis Austin; DJ Burn One; DJ Dahi; DJ Yonny; December Moon; Dom; J-Kits; Jidenna; Kariz Marcel; Lil' C; Mike & Keys; Miles James; Nana Kwabena; Roman GianArthur; Salem Brown; Stephen Gordon; The Five Points Bakery

Jidenna chronology
The Chief (2017)	85 to Africa (2019)

Singles from 85 to Africa
- 1. "Tribe" Released: July 26, 2019; 2. "Sufi Woman" Released: July 26, 2019; 3. "Zodi" Released: August 9, 2019; 4. "Sou Sou" Released: August 9, 2019

85 to Africa is the second studio album by Nigerian-American recording artist Jidenna. It was released on August 23, 2019 through Wondaland and Epic Records. It follows the release of both his debut effort The Chief and the EP Boomerang (both released in 2017). The album features guest appearances from GoldLink, St. Beauty, Mr Eazi, Mereba and Seun Kuti. Reviews for the record were positive, often praising the production and lyrical content. 85 to Africa charted at number 112 on the Billboard 200. The accompanying singles "Tribe", "Sufi Woman", "Zodi", and "Sou Sou" were released.

== Critical reception ==
Professional ratings
Review scores
Source	Rating
AllMusic	3.5/5 stars
The Guardian	3/5 stars
HipHopDX	3.7/5
Pitchfork	6.7/10
The Root	(favorable)

85 to Africa garnered positive reviews from music critics. AllMusic writer Andy Kellman wrote that: "Continuing where the Boomerang EP left off, even tighter lyrical, sonic, and collaborative connections are made with his father's home continent. The rapping and singing dandy is still chiefin' — coasting on charisma and wit more than skill, preening and gloating through much of the LP in his inimitable way, humble enough to accept one of the humorous nicknames bestowed on him." Brody Kenny of HipHopDX praised Jidenna's "charismatic performances" throughout the album and its world-spanning production but was critical of his lyrics being "shoddy" and "egregious" at points and not bringing more focus to himself, concluding that: "[T]here's no sense of shyness in Jidenna when he performs, his vocals ringing out proudly and loudly at the top of the mix. But he might be holding himself — and his music — back by not presenting himself as boldly as he could. He can use his voice for rapping and singing, but he's still getting the hang of using it to truly deliver a message."

Pitchfork contributor Rawiya Kameir was also critical of Jidenna's "hardy, awkward rapping" not quite living up to his ambitious ideas but gave praise to DJ Dahi and Nana Kwabena's "cinematic and expansive" production, the "universally understood" cultural references and the record's second half for best embodying its "metaphorical highway to Africa" concept, concluding that: "It feels necessary to celebrate the visibility of these songs, propelled into the mainstream without the rubric of any A-list affiliation. It would be unwise to extrapolate too much from such anomalies, but it's hard not to feel that Jidenna's right about something." Dean Van Nguyen of The Guardian found criticism in the album's production being "clean to the point of sterility" and Jidenna himself being a "competent rhyme-spitter" that "lacks distinction", but gave praise to "Worth the Weight" and "The Other Half" for showcasing his "star quality", concluding that: "In these moments, Jidenna gives reason to believe he can outlast the gimmicks."

== Track listing ==
85 to Africa
No.	Title	Writer(s)	Producer(s)	Length
1.	"Worth the Weight" (featuring Seun Kuti)	Jidenna Mobisson; Nana Kwabena Tuffuor; Dacoury Natche; Robert Bell; Ronald Bell; Claydes Charles Smith; George Brown; Gene Redd; Woodrow Sparrow; Dennis Thomas; Richard Westfield	Nana Kwabena; DJ Dahi	4:22
2.	"85 to Africa"	Mobisson; Tuffuor; Jerren Spruill; Fela Kuti; Dominique Sanders	Nana Kwabena; J-Kits; Dom^{[a]}	2:23
3.	"Babouche" (featuring GoldLink)	Mobisson; D'Anthony Carlos; Jerren Spruill; Tuffuor; Dominique Sanders	J-Kits; Nana Kwabena^{[a]}; Dom^{[a]}	2:46
4.	"Tribe"	Mobisson; Tuffuor; Darwin Cordale Quinn; Michael Cox, Jr.; John Groover; Richard Allen Brown; Walter I. Williams	Jidenna; Lil' C; Mike & Keys^{[a]}; Nana Kwabena; Dom; DJ Burn One^{[a]}; Five Points Music Group^{[a]}	3:33
5.	"Sou Sou"	Mobisson; Tuffuor; Oladele "7G" Kiambu; Marcelius "Kariz Marcel" Martin; Milan Wiley; Stephen "Swanky" Gordon; Clarence McDonald; Derrick Parker; Gus Redmond; Lowrell Simon	7G; Kariz Marcel; Stephen "Swanky" Gordon; Nana Kwabena^{[a]}	3:48
6.	"Zodi" (featuring Mr Eazi)	Mobisson; Oluwatosin Ajibade; Tuffuor; Jonathan Avila; Curtis Avila; James Seals	Nana Kwabena; DJ Yonny^{[a]}; Curtis Austin^{[a]}	3:20
7.	"Sufi Woman"	Mobisson; Tuffuor; Ahlaam Abdulgalil; Françoise Hardy	Nana Kwabena	3:28
8.	"Vaporiza"	Mobisson; Tuffuor; Ilunga Chenji Kamanda wa Kamanda Gaston Omer	Nana Kwabena; Dom^{[a]}	2:59
9.	"Pretty & Afraid"	Mobisson; Roman GianArthur Irvin; Tuffuor; Sekou Bembeya Diabete	Roman GianArthur; Nana Kwabena^{[a]}	4:06
10.	"Jungle Fever"	Mobisson; Eleanor Kateri Tannis; Christian Gregory; Miles C. James	Christian Gregory; Miles James	3:30
11.	"The Other Half" (featuring St. Beauty and Mereba)	Mobisson; Tuffuor; Alexandria Rosemond; Carissa Murray; Dominique Sanders; Marian Azeb Mereba; Andrew Johnson; Salem Brown; Irvin; Nick Seeley; Sebastio Rodrigues Maia; Jacques Burbick	Nana Kwabena; Roman GianArthur^{[a]}; December Moon^{[a]}; Dom^{[a]}; Salem Brown^{[a]}	6:53
Total length:				41:08

Notes

- ^{^{^[a]}} – signifies a co-producer

== Charts ==
Chart performance for 85 to Africa
Chart (2019)	Peak position
US Billboard 200	112
US Top Album Sales (Billboard)	47

== Release history ==
Region	Date	Format	Label	Ref.
Various	August 23, 2019	Digital download; streaming	Epic	
Various	March 6, 2020	Vinyl	Epic	
