= Lady and the Tramp (soundtrack) =

2019 soundtrack album by various artists

Lady and the Tramp (Original Soundtrack)

Soundtrack album by Various artists
- Released: November 12, 2019
- Genre: Classical; jazz; blues
- Length: 1:24:01
- Label: Walt Disney
- Producer: Joseph Trapanese

Singles from Lady and the Tramp (Original Soundtrack)
- 1. "That's Enough" Released: November 18, 2019

Lady and the Tramp (Original Soundtrack) is the soundtrack album for the 2019 film of the same name, produced by Walt Disney Pictures, which itself adapted from Disney's 1955 animated film. The original songs from the 1955 film written by Sonny Burke and Peggy Lee were included, alongside two new songs written by Nate "Rocket" Wonder and Roman GianArthur of Wondaland, and Janelle Monáe: a re-worked version of the Siamese Cat song, titled "What a Shame" and an original song titled "That's Enough" (performed by Monáe) being curated for the film. All the tracks were produced by Joseph Trapanese, who also composed the film's score. The album containing both the songs and score, were released on November 12, 2019, alongside the film.

== Development ==
On May 6, 2019, it was reported that Janelle Monáe will perform two new songs for the film. One of them titled "The Siamese Cat Song" will be replaced by a new track, due to both its modern-day perceived racist connotations and to fit the characters' depictions in the film. The song had problematic lyrics based on the depiction of Asian culture. The song was ultimately reworked as a blues song titled "What a Shame". She also performed the cover version of the song "He's a Tramp" and an original song titled "That's Enough", released after the soundtrack release.

Other songs of the original film were retained. On creating new music for the film, GianArthur had stated "I think Nate [Wonder] and I certainly fall into the category of having listened to these songs from Lady and the Tramp growing up, so it was a challenge. But you mentioned earlier like doing research on Disney, and we certainly did research a lot of songs. And we found the common denominator in a lot of the songs was a certain cheekiness, there's like a beauty, there's moments of like built-in laughs and things like that. It's like if you were singing them to yourself, you're gonna start laughing. So that was kind of the benchmark." Though the film was set in the 1910s, Monáe had pulled the musical style from 20's and 60's music, and derived her style from popular jazz vocalists, Ella Fitzgerald, Nat King Cole, Rosemary Clooney and Peggy Lee.

Joseph Trapanese had produced the score even before the film began production, and went to New Orleans to collaborate with local musicians, for the jazz and blues infused music. He added that "the music goes deeper into the time period and the beginning of jazz. Charlie Bean and I worked diligently to celebrate the original film by maintaining the spirit of the classic songs, while being unafraid to explore the benefits of modern production and scoring to create an updated musical identity for today." He collaborated with the 125-piece orchestra, consisting an array of instrumentalists, choir members to produce the early-20th century influenced music, which was recorded at the MGM Scoring Stage in Sony Pictures Studios, California. According to him, the music captured the essence of each and every character in the film. Alongside working on the score, he had produced the original songs from the 1955 film, as well as two new songs.

== Reception ==
Writing for Laughing Place, Alex Reif wrote "The soundtrack to Lady and the Tramp from Disney+ offers some updates on the classic songs from the animated feature, a few new ones, and a beautiful score by Joseph Trapanese. While it doesn't top the soundtrack from the 1955 animated version, there are some beautiful themes and some worthwhile performances to satisfy the tastes of Disney music collectors."

== Track listing ==
All music is composed by Joseph Trapanese, except where noted.

No.	Title	Writer(s)	Artist	Length
1.	"Main Title (Bella Notte)/Peace on Earth"	Sonny Burke and Peggy Lee	Lady and the Tramp Studio Choir and Donald Novis	2:23
2.	"Welcome to the Family"			2:58
3.	"Another Perfect Day (La La Lu)"			1:06
4.	"The Tramp"			3:02
5.	"Busting Peg and Bull"			3:33
6.	"Tramp Comes to Town"			3:08
7.	"La La Lu"	Burke and Lee	Kiersey Clemons	1:19
8.	"Baby Moves In"			1:27
9.	"Auntie Arrives"			1:43
10.	"What a Shame"	Nate "Rocket" Wonder, Roman GianArthur, and Janelle Monáe	Wonder and GianArthur	2:27
11.	"Muzzled"			4:24
12.	"Scenic Route"			2:41
13.	"Getting on the Boat"			1:54
14.	"Carriage Ride"			2:17
15.	"Tony and Joe"			2:29
16.	"Bella Notte"	Burke and Lee	F. Murray Abraham and Arturo Castro	2:50
17.	"A Home"			3:09
18.	"Left Behind"			1:52
19.	"Dog Catcher Chase"			3:38
20.	"Lady at Pound"			1:53
21.	"He's a Tramp (2019)"	Burke, Lee and Monáe	Monáe	1:34
22.	"The One Way Door"			1:34
23.	"They Came Back"			1:28
24.	"Lady Meets Lulu"			1:11
25.	"Howling at the Moon"			1:03
26.	"I Missed You"			4:43
27.	"Rat"			6:10
28.	"Caught"			1:36
29.	"Carriage Chase"			5:19
30.	"He Has a Home"			4:39
31.	"Peace on Earth"	Burke and Lee	Clemons	2:20
32.	"That's Enough"	Wonder and GianArthur	Monáe	2:10
