= The Let Out =

The Let Out may refer to:

- "The Let Out", a song by J. Cole from The Fall-Off (2026)
- "The Let Out", a song by Jidenna from The Chief (2017)
