= Long Live the Chief =

Single by Jidenna

from the album The Chief
- Released: December 21, 2015
- Recorded: 2015
- Genre: Hip hop
- Length: 2:40
- Label: Wondaland; Epic
- Songwriters: Julian Nixon; Craig Balmoris; Jidenna Mobisson; Nana Kwabena Tuffuor; Milan Wiley; Eleanor Kateri Tannis
- Producer: Best Kept Secret

Jidenna singles chronology
| "Yoga" (2015) | "Long Live the Chief" (2015) | "Blush" (2023) |

Music video
- "Long Live the Chief" on YouTube

"Long Live the Chief" is a song recorded by American rapper Jidenna. It was released on December 21, 2015, by Wondaland Records and Epic Records as the lead single from his debut studio album, The Chief (2017). The track was produced by Best Kept Secret.

== Music video ==
The song's accompanying music video premiered on December 10, 2015, on Jidenna's YouTube account. The music video was directed by Benny Boom.

== Live performances ==
On October 13, 2016, Jidenna performed the song on The Daily Show.

A performance of "Long Live The Chief" was presented as a sound check during the opening of S01E05 of Luke Cage.

== Track listing ==
Digital download
| No. | Title | Length |
|---|---|---|
| 1. | "Long Live the Chief" | 2:40 |

== Charts ==
| Chart (2016) | Peak position |
|---|---|
| US Bubbling Under Hot 100 (Billboard) | 10 |
| US Hot R&B/Hip-Hop Songs (Billboard) | 48 |
