= American Utopia =

Studio album by David Byrne
- Released: March 9, 2018
- Studios: DB Spare Bedroom (New York City); Reservoir Studios (NYC); Oscilloscope (NYC); XL Studios (NYC); Crowdspacer Studio (NYC); Livingston Studio 1 (London)
- Genres: Art pop; art rock
- Length: 37:17
- Labels: Nonesuch; Todo Mundo
- Producers: David Byrne; Brian Eno; Rodaidh McDonald

David Byrne chronology
Brass Tactics (2014)	American Utopia (2018)	American Utopia on Broadway (2019)

Singles from American Utopia
- 1. "Everybody’s Coming to My House" Released: January 8, 2018; 2. "This Is That" Released: January 31, 2018

American Utopia is the eighth studio album by American rock musician David Byrne, released on March 9, 2018, through Todo Mundo and Nonesuch Records. Although the album is credited solely to David Byrne, longtime collaborator Brian Eno wrote 8 of the 10 songs, and played on four of them. This release is Byrne's first solo-credited studio album since 2004's Grown Backwards, and serves as a musical component of a larger multimedia project titled Reasons to Be Cheerful, which attempts to spread positivity. Byrne announced the album and released its lead single, "Everybody's Coming to My House", on January 8, 2018. A second single, "This Is That", was released on January 31.

== Recording and release ==
The album is part of a larger multimedia project titled Reasons to Be Cheerful which aims to give reasons for being happy and optimistic in spite of political strife and environmental problems. The title is derived from the Ian Dury song "Reasons to Be Cheerful, Part 3".

== Reception ==
=== Critical reception ===
Professional ratings
Aggregate scores
Source	Rating
AnyDecentMusic?	7.0/10
Metacritic	72/100
Review scores
Source	Rating
AllMusic	3.5/5 stars
The A.V. Club	B
The Daily Telegraph	4/5 stars
Entertainment Weekly	B+
The Guardian	2/5 stars
Mojo	4/5 stars
NME	4/5 stars
Pitchfork	5.8/10
Q	4/5 stars
Rolling Stone	3.5/5 stars

American Utopia received generally positive reviews from critics. At Metacritic, which assigns a normalized rating out of 100 to reviews from mainstream critics, the album has an average score of 72 based on 32 reviews, indicating "generally favorable reviews". The Arts Desk's Howard Male gave the album a positive review calling it a "a muscular and quirky return to form". Erik Adams of The A.V. Club gave the album a B, calling the album an uneven "mixed bag" but praising the album's themes.

=== Commercial reception ===
American Utopia became Byrne's first top 10 album on the Billboard 200, debuting at No. 3 with the equivalent of 63,000 copies sold in the United States.

== Tour ==
The release of the album was backed by the American Utopia Tour, which lasted from March to November 2018. The elaborate concert featured an empty stage surrounded by metal chains and a cast of twelve musicians, including Byrne himself, sporting bare feet and wearing identical gray suits. Cutting-edge technology in wireless audio, MIDI, lighting and real-time tracking was used to totally untether the musicians from any cables, allowing free movement and complex choreography (developed by Annie-B Parson) like in Byrne's previous tours. In addition to songs from American Utopia, the setlist incorporated material from Byrne's solo catalogue, several hits by Talking Heads and a cover of Janelle Monáe's "Hell You Talmbout". The tour legs included North and South America, Europe, Oceania and a concert in Hong Kong.

== Other media ==
=== Broadway show ===
In September 2019, an altered version of the concert was previewed at the Colonial Theatre in Boston. It featured small changes to the setlist and to the structure to achieve a format closer to that of a musical stage production. It premiered on Broadway at the Hudson Theatre in previews on October 4, 2019, and officially on October 20, closing on February 16, 2020. A second run, scheduled to start in September 2020, was postponed by the COVID-19 pandemic. It was eventually moved to the St. James Theatre, where it started on September 17, 2021, and ended on April 3, 2022.

=== Cast recording ===
A live recording of the Broadway production titled American Utopia on Broadway was released in 2019 and received a Grammy Award for Best Musical Theater Album nomination.

=== Film ===
A film version of the Broadway play was produced and directed by Spike Lee as a documentary/concert film, released in late 2020. debuting on HBO.

=== Picture Book ===
An homonymous picture book was released in late 2020, intended to be a companion piece to the Broadway show. The book includes words and lyrics by Byrne and illustrations by Maira Kalman.

== Track listing ==
All tracks are written by David Byrne and Brian Eno, except where noted.

No.	Title	Writer(s)	Length
1.	"I Dance Like This"		3:33
2.	"Gasoline and Dirty Sheets"		3:19
3.	"Every Day Is a Miracle"		4:46
4.	"Dog's Mind"		2:29
5.	"This Is That"	Byrne, Daniel Lopatin	4:31
6.	"It's Not Dark Up Here"		4:10
7.	"Bullet"		3:09
8.	"Doing the Right Thing"		3:38
9.	"Everybody's Coming to My House"		3:29
10.	"Here"	Byrne, Lopatin	4:13
Total length:			37:13

== Personnel ==
Personnel according to David Byrne's homepage.

- David Byrne – vocals, guitar (tracks 1–3, 6–10), keyboards (1, 2, 7, 9), pads (9)
- Rodaidh McDonald – arrangements (2–5, 10), (additional) keyboards (1–3, 6, 8, 9), drum programming (2–9), "verse percussion" (1), bells (6), strings (7)
- Daniel Lopatin – keyboards (4, 5, 8, 10), drums (4, 5, 10), synthesizers and bass (4), processing and textures (8, 9), strings (8)
- Brian Eno – drum programming, vocoder, background vocals and "prog ride tracks" (1), keyboards (6, 8), percussion (6, 9), voice effects, whistling, celeste and brass (6), drums (8), "robot rhythm guitar" (9)
- Thomas Bartlett (Doveman) – Mellotron (1, 2, 7, 9), piano (1)
- Joey Waronker – tom and snare (1)
- Alex Epton – drum programming (2, 6, 8), choir programming (2), synthesizer stabs (3), bass (7), cymbals (8), shaker (9)
- Jack Peñate – keyboards (2, 3, 7), backing vocals (2, 7), textures (2), drums, bass and shaker (3)
- Happa – drum programming (2, 9), electronics and drums (3), synthesizer solo (9)
- Jaakko Savolainen – guitar, bass and synthesizer (2), keyboards (3)
- Isaiah Barr – saxophone (2, 9)
- Jamie Edwards – sitar samples (2)
- Nathan Jenkins – harmonica solo and voices (2)
- Ben Reed – live bass (3, 9)
- Magnus Bang Olsen – piano (3)
- Jam City – synth stabs, guitar and drums (3)
- Koreless – drums (3)
- Ben Anderson – cymbal (3)
- Joe Williams – harp (5)
- Mauro Refosco – percussion (6–9)
- Ariel Rechtshaid – flexatone (6)
- Airhead - drums (7)
- MMPH - main orchestral arrangement and sounds (8)
- Brian Wolfe - drums (8)
- Sampha – piano (9)
- Ethan P. Flynn – "middle 8 section synthesizer" (9)

Production

- David Byrne, Rodaidh McDonald and Patrick Dillett – production
- Brian Eno – original tracks
- Alex Epton, Matt Cohn and Patrick Dillett – recording engineers
- Gabriel Schuman - additional engineering (5)
- David Wrench – mix and additional programming
- Marta Salogni, Jack Sugden and Tuck Nelson – mix engineers
- Greg Calbi – mastering
- Purvis Young – cover art

== Charts ==
Weekly chart performance for American Utopia
Chart (2018)	Peak
Australian Albums (ARIA)	82
Austrian Albums (Ö3 Austria)	22
Belgian Albums (Ultratop Flanders)	19
Belgian Albums (Ultratop Wallonia)	88
Canadian Albums (Billboard)	2
Czech Albums (ČNS IFPI)	37
Dutch Albums (Album Top 100)	43
French Albums (SNEP)	129
German Albums (Offizielle Top 100)	31
Irish Albums (IRMA)	18
Italian Albums (FIMI)	32
Japanese Albums (Oricon)	13
New Zealand Heatseeker Albums (RMNZ)	2
Portuguese Albums (AFP)	10
Scottish Albums (Official Charts)	14
Swiss Albums (Schweizer Hitparade)	21
UK Albums (Official Charts)	16
US Billboard 200	3
US Top Rock Albums (Billboard)	1

Annual chart performance for American Utopia
Chart (2018)	Position
US Top Rock Albums (Billboard)	74
