= The Chief (album) =

Studio album by Jidenna
- Released: February 17, 2017
- Recorded: 2015–16
- Genres: Hip hop; pop; R&B
- Length: 57:28
- Labels: Wondaland; Epic
- Producers: Jidenna (also exec.); Nana Kwabena (also exec.); Best Kept Secret; Nate "Rocket" Wonder; Roman GianArthur; Andrew Horowitz; Frank Dukes; Mark Williams; Volta; f a l l e n; Mikey Mike; Jupiter; Jon Jon Traxx; Laco; Ellis Martin; Sonny Digital; Hit-Boy; Nick Seeley; B HAM

Jidenna chronology
Wondaland Presents: The Eephus (2015)	The Chief (2017)	85 to Africa (2019)

Singles from The Chief
- 1. "Long Live the Chief" Released: December 21, 2015; 2. "Chief Don't Run" Released: June 27, 2016; 3. "Little Bit More" Released: July 8, 2016; 4. "The Let Out" Released: February 3, 2017

The Chief is the debut studio album by Nigerian-American hip hop recording artist Jidenna, released on February 17, 2017, by Wondaland and Epic Records. It features guest appearances from fellow labelmates Roman GianArthur, Nana Kwabena, Janelle Monáe and St. Beauty. The album's artwork pays homage to Boz Scaggs' 1980 album Middle Man. It garnered positive reviews from critics for its globe-trotting, genre-hopping production and showcasing Jidenna's charismatic delivery and knack for narrative storytelling. The Chief debuted at number 38 on the Billboard 200 and spawned four singles: "Long Live the Chief", "Chief Don't Run", "Little Bit More" and "The Let Out".

== Promotion ==
=== Singles ===
The lead single from the album, called "Long Live the Chief" was released on December 21, 2015. The track was produced by Best Kept Secret.

The second single from the album, called "Chief Don't Run" was released on June 27, 2016, which features guest vocals from fellow American singer Roman GianArthur whom he had previously collaborated with on "Classic Man earlier in 2015." The track was produced by Nana Kwabena, Nate Wonder, Mark Williams and Volta.

The third single from the album, called "Little Bit More" was released on July 4, 2016. The track was produced by Roman GianArthur, Nana Kwabena and Mark Williams.

The fourth single from the album, called "The Let Out" was released on February 3, 2017. The song features guest vocals from Southern hip hop rapper Quavo from the hip hop group Migos, although Quavo is not featured on the album version. The track was produced by Nana Kwabena.

=== Other songs ===
"Knickers" and "Extraordinaire" were released on December 21, 2015, alongside "Long Live the Chief", but did not make the final cut on the album.

The album's first promotional single, "Bambi", was released on February 9, 2017. The song was produced by Jidenna himself and Nate "Rocket" Wonder.

=== Tour ===
On May 17, 2017 Jidenna announced that he was going on his 24-city "Long Live the Chief Tour" for the summer to support the record, beginning on July 20 in Raleigh, North Carolina and finishing up in Vancouver on August 27.

== Critical reception ==
Professional ratings
Aggregate scores
Source	Rating
Metacritic	73/100
Review scores
Source	Rating
AllMusic	3.5/5 stars
Exclaim!	8/10
The Guardian	3/5 stars
HipHopDX	3.7/5
The New York Times	(favorable)
Pitchfork	5.8/10
Filter Free Nigeria	9/10

The Chief received generally positive reviews from music critics. At Metacritic, which assigns a normalized rating out of 100 to reviews from mainstream publications, the album received an average score of 73, based on 9 reviews. Erin Lowers of Exclaim! said, "Just as Jidenna uses hip-hop music to convey the story of an immigrant, he reaches across the globe to pull from seemingly disparate genres as he tells his tales. Surprisingly, Jidenna makes it work, commanding the listener's attention from start to finish." Preezy of XXL said, "The project gives Jidenna an identity that any artist aspires to: someone who makes pretty damn good music. He’ll still have to continue to get listeners familiar with what makes the man behind the music tick, but The Chief is an admirable beginning to what appears to be a blossoming career." Eric Diep of HipHopDX said, "While The Chief sets him up for a more focused second effort, Jidenna’s genre-hopping album is merely a sliver of his versatility as an entertainer." Andy Kellman of AllMusic said, "What's thrown, including tepid trap beats, passable tropical pop-house, and overly fanciful retro-contemporary touches, doesn't always stick, yet Jidenna's charismatic flair and sharp writing make almost all of it entertaining, rarely dull. In a way, he's a Kid Creole for the 2010s, mixing and matching old and new cross-continental sounds with a twinkle in his eye, a glide in his stride, and a special knack for storybook-style narration." Elias Leight of Pitchfork said, A versatile dandy, Jidenna tries on many different musical styles with his debut album—but all that changing quickly grows tiresome."

== Commercial performance ==
The Chief debuted at number 38 on the Billboard 200, selling 13,312 album equivalent units, and 8,387 pure album copies in the first week.

== Track listing ==
The Chief track listing
No.	Title	Writer(s)	Producer(s)	Length
1.	"A Bull's Tale"	Jidenna Mobisson; Nana Kwabena Tuffuor; Nathaniel Irvin III; Mark Williams; Raul Cubina; Andrew Horowitz; Nana Afriyie; Amaka Izuchi; Henry Obiefule; Adam Feeney	Nana Kwabena; Frank Dukes; OjiVolta^{[a]}	4:56
2.	"Chief Don't Run" (featuring Roman GianArthur)	Mobisson; Irvin III; Williams; Tuffuor; Roman GianArthur Irvin; Cubina; Horowitz; Joseph Young III; Afriyie; Milan Wiley; Leslie Gray	Nana Kwabena; Nate "Rocket" Wonder; Ojivolta; Jidenna^{[a]}	3:47
3.	"Trampoline"	Mobisson; Tuffuor; Irvin III; Horowitz; Obiefule; Emmanuel Quist-Fianyeku; Feeney; Jack Keller; Noel Sherman	Jidenna; Nana Kwabena; Andrew Horowitz; Nate "Rocket" Wonder; Frank Dukes^{[b]}	5:01
4.	"Bambi"	Mobisson; Irvin III; Tuffuor; Horowitz	Jidenna; Nate "Rocket" Wonder; Nana Kwabena^{[a]}; Horowitz^{[b]}	4:10
5.	"Helicopters / Beware"	Mobisson; Tuffuor; Irvin III; Irvin; Carlos St John; Lee Stashenko; Michael Williams; Carl Taylor; Brandon Hamlin; Wiley	Nana Kwabena; Jidenna; f a l l e n; Kidd Jupiter; Mikey Mike^{[a]}; Ojivolta^{[a]}	6:18
6.	"Long Live the Chief"	Julian Nixon; Craig Balmoris; Mobisson; Tuffuor; Wiley; Eleanor Kateri Tannis	Best Kept Secret	2:40
7.	"2 Points"	Mobisson; Chauncey Hollis, Jr.; Tuffuor; Horowitz	Hit-Boy; Nana Kwabena^{[a]}; Horowitz^{[a]}	1:38
8.	"The Let Out" (featuring Nana Kwabena)	Mobisson; Tuffuor; Horowitz; Feeney; Wiley; Brandon Cromwell	Nana Kwabena; Horowitz^{[a]}; Frank Dukes^{[a]}	3:43
9.	"Safari" (featuring Janelle Monáe, St. Beauty, and Nana Kwabena)	Mobisson; Janelle Monáe Robinson; Tuffuor; John M. Webb, Jr.; Lacoster Tennant; Horowitz	Jon Jon Traxx; LaCo Music; Nana Kwabena^{[a]}; Horowitz^{[a]}	4:05
10.	"Adaora"	Mobisson; Tuffuor; Ra Olusegun Amen; Horowitz	Nana Kwabena; Jidenna	4:00
11.	"Little Bit More"	Akil King; Williams; Wiley; Mobisson; Jaramye Daniels; Eddy Kenzo; Cubina; Irvin; Kathryn Buford; Tuffuor; Tannis; Desiré Lynn Gaston	Roman GianArthur; Nana Kwabena; Ojivolta	3:26
12.	"Some Kind of Way"	Mobisson; Tuffuor; Grant Newsome; Wiley; Amen; Matthew Bair; Jae Choung; Virman Coquia; Eric Frederic; Kevin Nishimura; James Roh; Andreas Schuller	Nana Kwabena; Jidenna; Ellis Martin^{[b]}	3:55
13.	"White Niggas"	Mobisson; Tuffuor; Horowitz; Alexander Matthew Lipinski; Obiefule; Feeney	ADOTHEGOD; Jidenna; Nana Kwabena; Horowitz; Frank Dukes^{[b]}	5:25
14.	"Bully of the Earth"	Mobisson; Tuffuor; Horowitz; Nick Seeley; Sonny Uwaezuoke	Nana Kwabena; Sonny Digital; Horowitz; Seeley^{[a]}	4:25
Total length:				57:28

Notes

- ^{^{^[a]}} – signifies a co-producer
- ^{^{^[b]}} – signifies an additional producer

== Charts ==
Chart (2017)	Peak position
Canadian Albums (Billboard)	58
US Billboard 200	38
US Top R&B/Hip-Hop Albums (Billboard)	16

== Release history ==
Region	Date	Format	Version	Label	Ref.
Worldwide	February 17, 2017	CD, digital download	Clean; Explicit	Wondaland; Epic	
