= The Audition (album) =

Demo album by Janelle Monáe
- Released: 2003
- Studio: Wondaland Studios in Atlanta
- Genre: Pop
- Length: 52:07
- Label: Wondaland Arts Society
- Producer: Janelle Monáe; Cutmaster Swiff; Nate Wonder

Janelle Monáe chronology
The Audition (2003)	Metropolis: The Chase Suite (2007)

Singles from The Audition
- 1. "Lettin' Go" Released: January 1, 2006

The Audition is a demo album by American singer and songwriter Janelle Monáe, self-released and self-financed in 2003. Some versions of the album were later entitled Metropolis: Point Zero.

The album features thirteen songs and one instrumental, "I Won't Let Go". Before signing with Bad Boy Records, she distributed the album independently under the Wondaland Arts Society label, out of the Atlanta boarding house she was living in at the time. There are fewer than 500 physical copies in existence. The album features a cover of the song "Time Will Reveal" by DeBarge, which was later featured along with "Lettin' Go" on the Purple Ribbon All-Stars' 2005 studio album Got Purp? Vol. 2.

== Track listing ==
The Audition
No.	Title	Writer(s)	Length
1.	"Thoughts" (intro)	Janelle Robinson	1:42
2.	"Lettin' Go"	Robinson; Charles Joseph II; Nathaniel Irvin III; Terrence Smith	4:28
3.	"Party Girl"	Robinson	3:48
4.	"Metropolis"	Robinson	4:57
5.	"Cindi"	Robinson	2:15
6.	"It's Not Fair"	Robinson	3:48
7.	"Time Will Reveal"	Eldra DeBarge; Robert DeBarge Jr.; Etterlene DeBarge	3:33
8.	"My Favorite Nothing"	Robinson	3:56
9.	"Warm Up (Cloud 9)"	Robinson	0:47
10.	"Cloud 9"	Robinson	4:15
11.	"Star"	Robinson	4:45
12.	"I Won't Let Go"	Robinson	4:48
13.	"You"	Robinson	4:22
14.	"You Are My Everything"	Robinson	4:43
Total length:			52:07
