= St. Beauty =

American music group

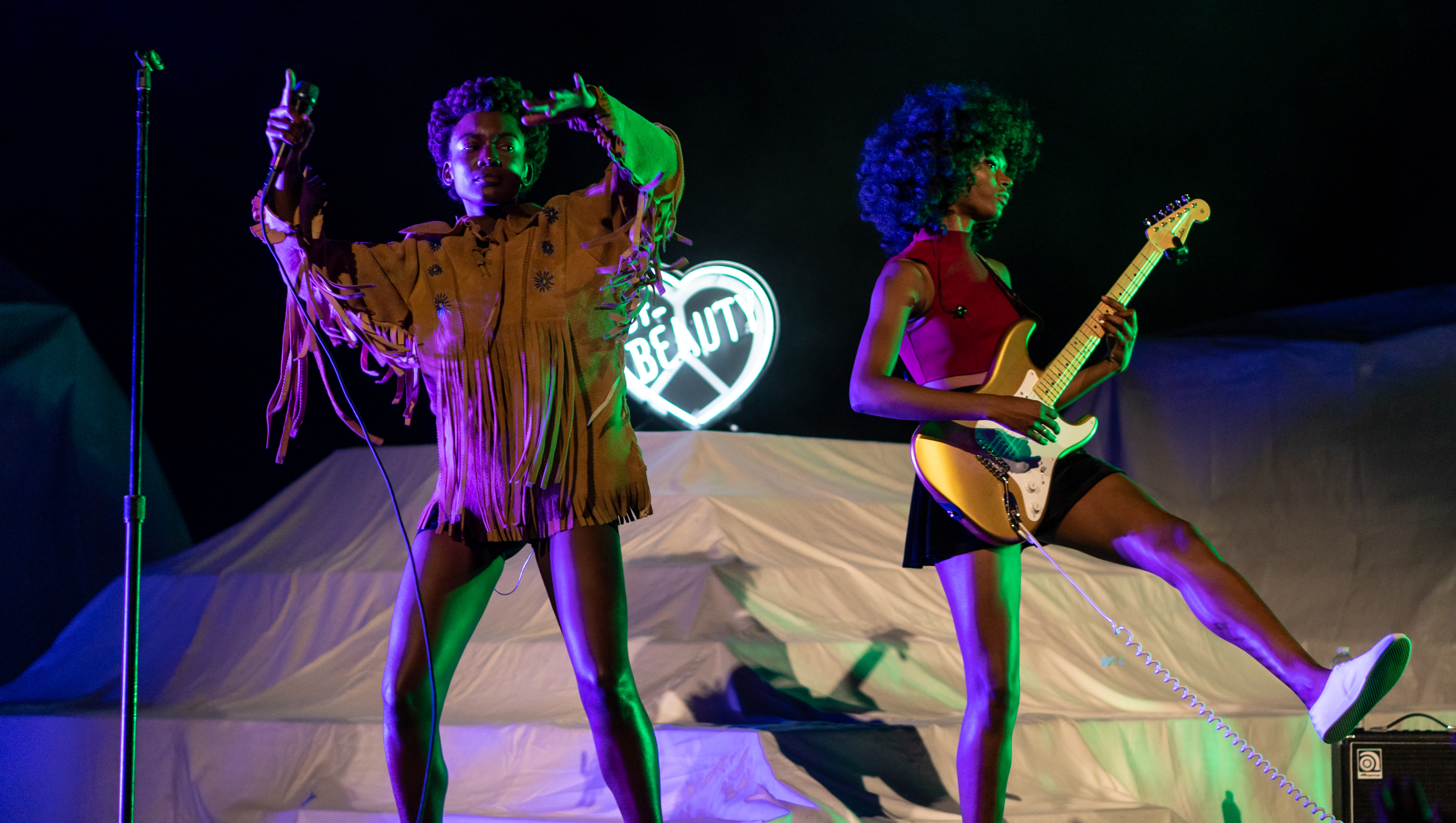
- St. Beauty opening for Janelle Monáe in 2018

Background information
- Genre: Neo soul
- Years active: 2012–2019
- Label: The Wondaland Arts Society
- Members: Alexe Belle; Isis Valentino

St. Beauty was an American musical duo consisting of singers Alexe Belle and Isis Valentino. The duo was affiliated with a larger artistic collective called Wondaland Art Society, a group of musicians that also includes Janelle Monáe, Jidenna, Roman GianArthur, and Deep Cotton. Both the duo and the collective are based in Atlanta, Georgia.

== Career ==
Belle and Valentino met while working at a clothing boutique that held a showcase for local artists in 2012. In light of the acclaim they received after the performance, the two officially formed a band and selected the name St. Beauty. In a 2015 interview, the duo explained that they selected the name because, "St. Beauty is a pure beauty that lives in everyone." Their mission is "to heal and inspire."

St. Beauty's song "Going Nowhere" appeared on the album, Wondaland Presents: The Eephus. The album was released on August 14, 2015, and was distributed by Epic Records. The album debuted at No. 5 on the Billboard Chart for R&B/Hip-Hop Albums. In November 2017, St. Beauty toured as an opening act for Jhené Aiko's Trip Tour.

In 2018, the group released their debut extended play Running to the Sun (executive produced by Jon Jon Traxx), featuring the singles "Caught" (2017), "Not Discuss It" (2018) and "Borders" (originally released in 2016).

Though no official announcement was made, the group seems to have parted ways between 2020 and 2021, erasing their official social media pages, and they both seem to be working on individual endeavors. Valentino is now creating music under the name Kharissa.wav

== Discography ==
=== Extended play ===
Title	Details
Running to the Sun	Released: January 19, 2018; Label: The Wondaland Arts Society, Empire; Formats: Digital download, streaming, LP

=== Singles ===
==== As lead artist ====
Title	Year	Album
"Going Nowhere"	2015	Wondaland Presents: The Eephus
"Borders"	2016	Running to the Sun
"Holographic Lover"	2016	Non-album single
"Caught"	2017	Running to the Sun
"Not Discuss It"	2018	Running to the Sun

==== As featured artist ====
Title	Year	Album
"Hell You Talmbout" (Janelle Monáe and various artists)	2015	Non-album single
"Castles" (Bosco featuring St. Beauty)	2017	b.
"No Escape" (Spree Wilson featuring St. Beauty & Big Rube)	2019	Thank You for Coming, Enjoy

=== Guest appearances ===
Title	Year	Other artists	Album
"Safari"	2017	Jidenna, Janelle Monáe, Nana Kwabena	The Chief
"Up"	2017	Pvndo, Bobby Earth	Shapes in Odd Spaces
"PTSD"	2019	Dreamville, Omen, Mereba, Deante' Hitchcock	Revenge of the Dreamers III
"The Other Half"	2019	Jidenna, Mereba	85 to Africa
