= Seun Kuti =

Nigerian Afrobeat saxophonist and singer (born 1983)

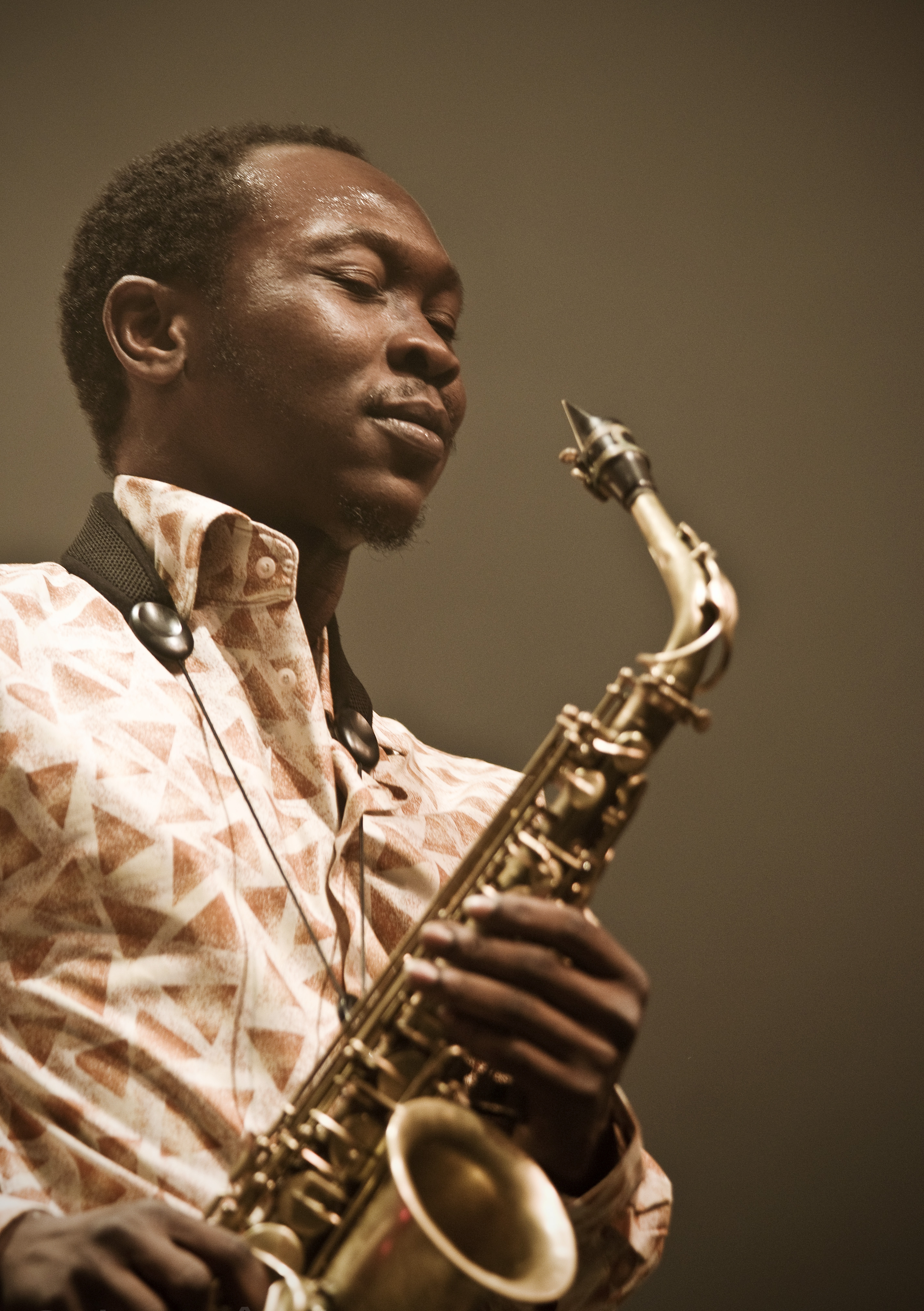
- Seun Kuti at the 2008 Marsatac Festival in Marseille, France

Background information
- Born: Oluseun Anikulapo Kuti; 11 January 1983 (age 43); Lagos, Nigeria
- Origin: Nigeria
- Genre: Afrobeat
- Occupations: Musician; singer
- Instruments: Vocals; saxophone
- Labels: Disorient Records; Knitting Factory Records; Strut Records
- Website: https://www.seunkutimusic.com/

Oluseun Anikulapo Kuti (born 11 January 1983), popularly known Seun Kuti, is a Nigerian musician, singer and the youngest son of Afrobeat pioneer Fela Kuti. Seun leads his father's former band Egypt 80.

== Early life and education ==
The youngest son of Fela Kuti, Seun Kuti was born in 1983. He became interested in music at the age of five, by the time he turned nine, he had started playing with his father's band, Egypt 80.

Following in the footsteps of his father, Kuti pursued his musical education at the Liverpool Institute for Performing Arts. During his time there, he became a member of the African Funk ensemble known as River Niger.

== Biography ==
Fela Kuti died in 1997 and Seun Kuti took to the role of leading Egypt 80.

In 2008, the band released an album called Many Things. This was the first album released under the moniker Seun Kuti & Egypt 80.

He is featured in Calle 13's song "Todo se mueve" (Everything Moves), on their 2010 album Entren los que quieran.

In 2014, Kuti was given an honorary invitation to perform live for the first time at the Industry Nite.

In 2019, Kuti was a featured guest on 85 to Africa; the second album by American rapper Jidenna. In June, Kuti was featured in the Visual Collaborative electronic catalogue, under the Polaris series, he was interviewed on Pan-African awareness, his country and music.

In 2024, Kuti and Egypt 80 released their sixth studio album, Heavier Yet (Lays the Crownless Head), via Record Kicks. The project served as his first full-length album in six years following his Grammy-nominated 2018 release, Black Times. To support the release, Kuti embarked on the global "Heavier Yet Tour" spanning across Europe, Asia, and Oceania throughout late 2024 and 2026.

In 2026, Kuti publicly discussed his position within the domestic music market during an appearance on the Saleh Meditate podcast, stating that his politically-charged, conscious style of Afrobeat had led to him being systematically blacklisted from Nigeria's mainstream industry for over 13 years.

== Politics ==
Kuti participated actively in the Occupy Nigeria protests against the fuel subsidy removal policy of President Goodluck Jonathan in his country Nigeria in January 2012.

In 2019, on Jidenna's 85 to Africa album Kuti voiced an outro of a song with the words:

"I believe it's time for an African peoples powered highway. A highway that will connect the Diaspora and Motherland. A global highway for African people all over the world to rediscover themselves. To remember that the only thing that unites black people, globally, the only thing we all have in common is that we are from Africa".

In November 2020, Kuti led the revival of his father's defunct political party – Movement of the People – with the intention of registering it with Nigeria's electoral body, INEC.

In fall 2023, Kuti signed the open letter Artists Against Apartheid in support of Palestinians.

== Personal life ==
On 16 December 2013, Kuti and his partner had a daughter. Kuti is an atheist.

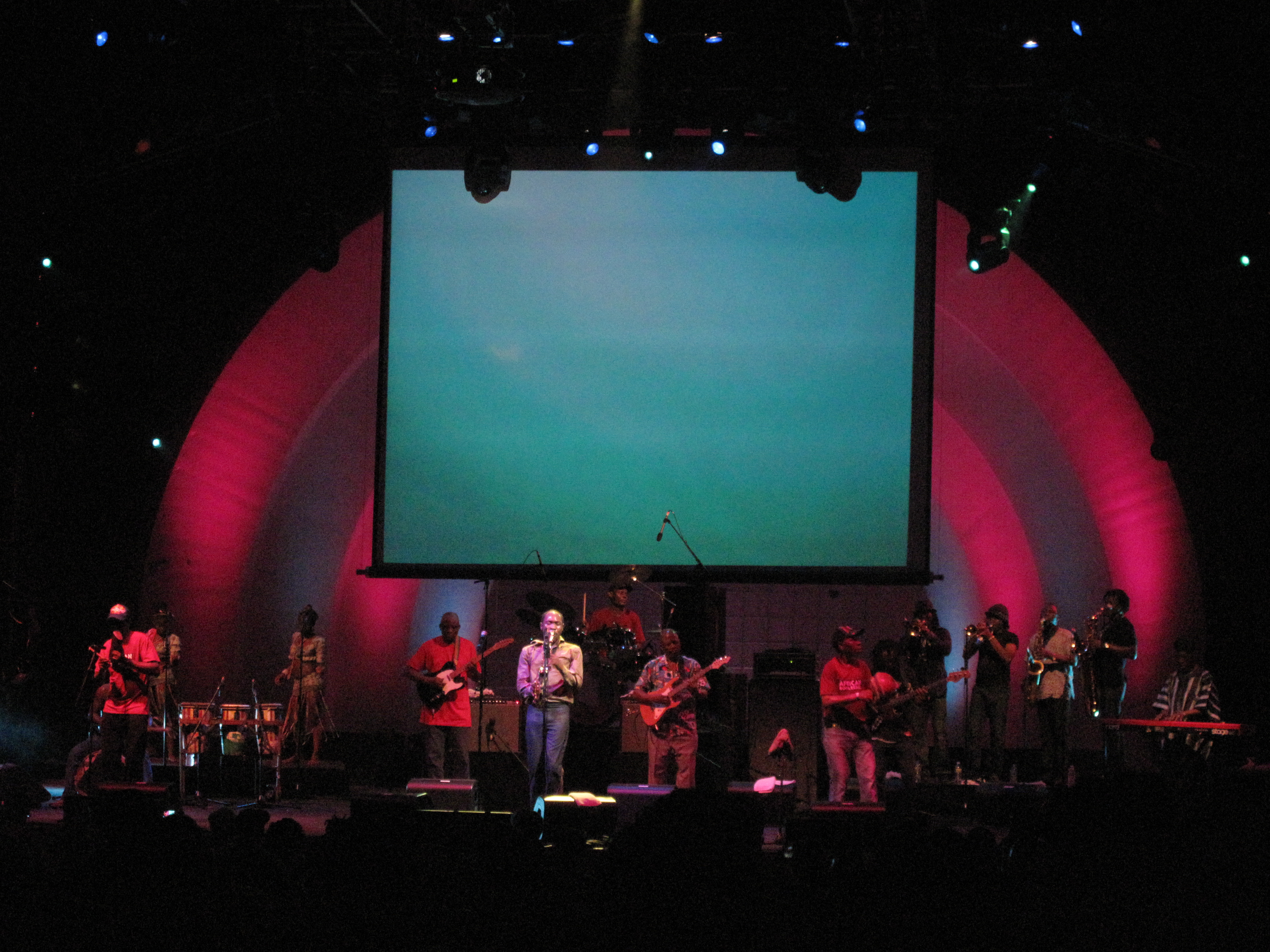
Seun Kuti and the Egypt 80 Orchestra performing at Celebrate Brooklyn 2011

== Discography ==
Released as Sean Kuti & Egypt 80:

=== Studio albums ===
- Many Things (CD & LP album, 2008, Tôt ou Tard, Disorient Records)
- From Africa With Fury: Rise (2011, Knitting Factory Records/Because Music)
- A Long Way to the Beginning (2014, Knitting Factory Records)
- Struggle Sounds (EP, 2016, Sony Masterworks)
- Black Times (CD & LP album, 2018, Strut Records)
- Night Dreamer Direct to Disc Sessions (CD & LP, 2019, Night Dreamer Records)
- Heavier Yet (Lays The Crownless Head) (CD & LP album, 2024, Record Kicks)

=== Other recordings ===
- Think Africa (12", 2007)
- African Dreams EP (2022, with Black Thought)

=== Appearances ===
- "James Brown" (on the album I'm Not Bossy, I'm the Boss by Sinéad O'Connor) (2014, Nettwerk)
- "Float" (on the album The Age of Pleasure by Janelle Monáe (2023, Atlantic)

== Awards & recognitions ==
In 2018, Black Times, by Kuti was nominated for a Grammy Award in the World Music Category. This makes him the second child of the late Fela Anikulapo Kuti to be considered for this award, as his elder brother Femi Kuti has been previously nominated in the same category without a win.

In 2019, Kuti was named one of the "100 Most Influential People" by Time for his music and activism.

== See also ==
- Ransome-Kuti family
- Femi Kuti
