= Yoga (Janelle Monáe and Jidenna song) =

2015 song performed by Janelle Monáe

Single by Janelle Monáe and Jidenna

from the album Wondaland Presents: The Eephus
- Released: March 31, 2015
- Recorded: 2014–15
- Genre: Hip hop; trap
- Length: 3:37
- Label: Wondaland; Epic
- Songwriters: Charles Joseph II; Eleanor Kateri Tannis; Janelle Monáe Robinson; Jidenna Theodore Mobisson; Milan Wiley; Nana Kwabena Tuffuor; Nathaniel Irvin III; Roman GianArthur Irvin
- Producers: Jidenna; Nana Kwabena; Nate "Rocket" Wonder

Janelle Monáe singles chronology
| "Electric Lady" (2014) | "Yoga" (2015) | "Make Me Feel" (2018) |

Jidenna singles chronology
| "Classic Man" (2015) | "Yoga" (2015) | "Long Live the Chief" (2015) |

Alternate cover

"Yoga" is a song by American singer Janelle Monáe and Nigerian-American rapper Jidenna. It was released on March 31, 2015 as the second single from the collective EP, The Eephus. A departure from Monáe's well-known indie funk and psychedelic sound, "Yoga" is a hip hop and trap record with a more mainstream sound and lyrics that can be interpreted as "sexualized". Many music blogs and publications have praised Monáe for her creativity, sense of individuality and boldness on the track as well as Jidenna's relaxed flow. The song was produced by Nate "Rocket" Wonder, Nana Kwabena and Jidenna. In the United States, "Yoga" became Monáe's first single as a lead artist to chart on the Billboard Hot 100; the song, "We Are Young" on which she was featured, peaked at number one in 2012.

== Background ==
In February 2015, Monáe announced that she had signed her Wondaland Records label to a partnership deal with Epic Records. Soon after, she announced that she and her collective (Jidenna, St. Beauty, Roman GianArthur, and Deep Cotton) would be releasing a 5-track EP titled The Eephus. Epic CEO and chairman L.A. Reid said of Monáe and her collective, "The collective talent of the Wondaland artists is awe-inspiring," and also that, "I haven't personally witnessed a collective that sounds and looks this special in quite a while. I've been a longtime supporter and friend of Janelle and it is an honor to now work with her as a visionary businesswoman who brings an all-star group of talented performers to the table." The first single released under the new and revamped Wondaland Records for The Eephus EP was Jidenna's "Classic Man".

== Critical reception ==
Music critics were generally favorable towards the song. Many have also praised the inclusion of Jidenna's verse, with some calling his flow "fresh" and "promising". Writing for Billboard, Natalie Weiner says Monáe kept "the overall emphasis on girl power," and that Monáe added "a #FreeTheNipple moment with the line 'Get off my areola.'" Zara Husaini of PopCrush wrote of the song's catchiness that "There's a pretty good chance that you had Janelle Monae's “Yoga” stuck in your head for a few days after the single release." Global Grind's Kelsey Paine praised Monáe's new direction and stated that she has "taken off her tuxedo."

Time named "Yoga" the second-best song of 2015.

== Music video ==
A music video for the song was uploaded to a new Wondaland Vevo account on April 13, 2015. Directed by Dave Meyers and choreographed by Fatima Robinson and Sean Bankhead, the video features Monáe and a diverse group of women dancing and performing Yoga. The majority of the video is set in a workout studio; however, Jidenna's verse is delivered in a diner scene as well as the final moments of the video where Monáe and others join Jidenna and dance together until the video fades to a TV screen with the words, "The Eephus" written on it. This music video marks the first time in 14 years that Robinson and Meyers have collaborated as they last worked together on Aaliyah's music video for her single "More Than a Woman" in early August 2001. Actress Tessa Thompson makes a cameo in the video as one of Monáe's female dancers.

Writing online for Vibe, Iyana Robertson wrote, "Janelle Monae had a “Yoga” party, and you weren't invited." She also says of the video, "Starting with a classic, dancing-in-the-mirror, 'no boys allowed' session with her girlfriends, Janelle is part-serene, part-turn up as she transitions from levitating into a funky living room dance break. With a crown adorning her head, the video gets a bit more literal as the singer heads to the yoga studio. Backed by a troupe of bendable ladies, she gets her bounce on while mouthing bossy lyrics like 'You cannot police me, so get off my areola.'"

== Live performances ==
Monáe performed the song live for the first time, along with Jidenna and former contestant Adanna Duru, on the 14th season finale of American Idol on May 13, 2015. Monáe and Jidenna performed the song live for a second time on The Tonight Show Starring Jimmy Fallon on May 18, 2015. The song was performed live at the 15th BET Awards by Monáe and Jidenna along with his song, "Classic Man" on June 28, 2015.

== Track listing ==
Digital download
| No. | Title | Length |
|---|---|---|
| 1. | "Yoga" (with Jidenna) | 3:37 |

== Charts ==
=== Weekly charts ===
| Chart (2015) | Peak position |
|---|---|
| South Africa (EMA) | 10 |
| US Billboard Hot 100 | 79 |
| US Hot R&B/Hip-Hop Songs (Billboard) | 24 |

=== Year-end charts ===
| Chart (2015) | Position |
|---|---|
| US Hot R&B Songs (Billboard) | 22 |

== Certifications ==
| Region | Certification | Certified units/sales |
|---|---|---|
| United States (RIAA) | Gold | 500,000^{‡} |
^{‡} Sales+streaming figures based on certification alone.
