= Classic Man =

Single by Jidenna featuring Roman GianArthur

from the album Wondaland Presents: The Eephus
- Released: February 3, 2015
- Genre: Hip hop
- Length: 3:46 (original version); 3:55 (remix version)
- Label: Wondaland; Epic
- Songwriters: Amethyst Amelia Kelly; Charlotte Aitchison; Eleanor Kateri Tannis; George Astasio; Jasbir Sehra; Jason Pebworth; Jidenna Theodore Mobisson; John Turner; Jonathan Christopher Shave; Kurtis McKenzie; Milan Wiley; Nana Kwabena Tuffuor; Nathaniel Irvin III; Roman GianArthur Irvin
- Producers: Jidenna; Nana Kwabena; Nate "Rocket" Wonder

Jidenna singles chronology
"Classic Man" (2015)	"Yoga" (2015)

Roman GianArthur singles chronology
"I-69" (2013)	"Classic Man" (2015)

"Classic Man" is a song by Nigerian-American rapper Jidenna, released on February 3, 2015, as his commercial debut single by Epic Records. The song, which features vocals from American singer Roman GianArthur, was included on Janelle Monáe's Wondaland Records collective EP, The Eephus, as the lead single. In December 2015, it was nominated for a Grammy Award for Best Rap/Sung Performance. The song was produced by Jidenna, alongside Nana Kwabena and Nate "Rocket" Wonder.

== Composition ==
The song credits the writers of Australian rapper Iggy Azalea's 2014 single "Fancy", which Jidenna attributes to the similarity between the two songs and the increased caution of the record industry following the copyright infringement verdict against "Blurred Lines".

== Music video ==
The music video of the song was released to YouTube on February 20, 2015. The video shows Jidenna at a party, walking on the street, and at a martial arts school. The video was directed by Alan Ferguson. The music video for the remix was released on July 15, 2015. It features Jidenna and Kendrick Lamar rapping in various locations. Ty Dolla Sign, Janelle Monáe, Issa Rae, Roman GianArthur, and Hit-Boy make cameo appearances in the music video.

== Commercial performance ==
"Classic Man" debuted at number 89 on the US Billboard Hot 100 for the chart dated May 23, 2015. The song peaked at number 22 in its sixteenth week on the chart. As of August 2015, the song has sold 399,000 copies in the US.

== Remixes ==
Jidenna and Wondaland Records released a remix of the song featuring American rapper Kendrick Lamar, included as a bonus track on The Eephus EP. The remix was accompanied by a music video, which premiered on July 15, 2015. The remix is also featured in the video-games MLB The Show 16 and NBA Live 16. Jamaican rapper Sean Paul also released a remix of this song called "Ganja Man". T-Pain released a Jidenna approved remix called "Classic Man (T-Mix)", featuring Vantrease and Young Cash of Nappy Boy Entertainment.

== Usage in popular media ==
A Chopped and screwed version of "Classic Man" featured in the Academy Award winning 2016 film Moonlight. The track was also heard in the 2016 film Dirty Grandpa.

== Charts ==
=== Weekly charts ===
Chart (2015)	Peak position
Belgium (Ultratip Bubbling Under Flanders)	26
Belgium Urban (Ultratop Flanders)	44
Canada Hot 100 (Billboard)	59
France (SNEP)	142
South Africa (EMA)	7
UK Singles (OCC)	174
UK Hip Hop/R&B (OCC)	28
US Billboard Hot 100	22
US Dance/Mix Show Airplay (Billboard)	33
US Hot R&B/Hip-Hop Songs (Billboard)	8
US Pop Airplay (Billboard)	29
US R&B/Hip-Hop Airplay (Billboard)	5
US Rhythmic Airplay (Billboard)	2

=== Year-end charts ===
Chart (2015)	Position
US Billboard Hot 100	72
US Hot R&B/Hip-Hop Songs (Billboard)	22
US Rhythmic (Billboard)	19

== Certifications ==
Region	Certification	Certified units/sales
New Zealand (RMNZ)	Gold	7,500^{*}
United States (RIAA)	2× Platinum	2,000,000^{‡}
^{*} Sales figures based on certification alone.^{‡} Sales+streaming figures based on certification alone.
