= Wondaland Presents: The Eephus =

EP by Wondaland Records
- Released: August 14, 2015
- Recorded: 2014–15
- Genre: Hip-hop; psychedelic pop; R&B
- Length: 21:39
- Label: Wondaland; Epic; Sony
- Producer: Janelle Monáe Robinson; Roman GianArthur Irvin; Nathaniel Irvin III; Charles Joseph II

Singles from Wondaland Presents: The Eephus
- 1. "Classic Man" Released: February 3, 2015; 2. "Yoga" Released: March 31, 2015

Janelle Monáe chronology
The Electric Lady (2013)	Wondaland Presents: The Eephus (2015)	Dirty Computer (2018)

Jidenna chronology
iTunes Festival: London 2013 (2013)	Wondaland Presents: The Eephus (2015)	The Chief (2017)

Wondaland Presents: The Eephus is the second extended play (EP) by the artists signed to Wondaland Records. It was released on August 14, 2015, by Epic Records and Sony Music. The EP includes five tracks, featuring Janelle Monáe, Jidenna, Roman GianArthur, Deep Cotton and St. Beauty. The sixth track is the remix to Jidenna's "Classic Man" featuring Kendrick Lamar, and it is included with the EP on iTunes.

== Background ==
In February 2015, Janelle Monáe announced that she had signed her Wondaland Records label to a partnership deal with Epic Records. Soon after, she announced that she and her collective (Jidenna, St. Beauty, Roman GianArthur and Deep Cotton) would be releasing a 5-track EP titled The Eephus, which is a term used in baseball to an unusual type of pitch. Epic CEO and chairman L.A. Reid said of Monáe and her collective, "The collective talent of the Wondaland artists is awe-inspiring," and also that, "I haven't personally witnessed a collective that sounds and looks this special in quite a while. I've been a longtime supporter and friend of Janelle and it is an honor to now work with her as a visionary businesswoman who brings an all-star group of talented performers to the table". Two singles have been released from the EP Jidenna's "Classic Man" and Monáe's "Yoga", which also features Jidenna.

== Track listing ==
Digital download
No.	Title	Writer(s)	Artist(s)	Length
1.	"Let's Get Caught" (featuring Jidenna)	Nathaniel Irvin III; Charles Joseph II	Deep Cotton	4:00
2.	"Classic Man" (featuring Roman GianArthur)	Jidenna Mobisson; Nana Kwabena Tuffuor; Irvin III; Jasbir Sehra; Milan Wiley; Roman GianArthur Irvin; Eleanor Kateri Tannis; Charlotte Aitchison; George Astacio; Amethyst Kelly; Kurtis McKenzie; Jason Pebworth; Jonathan Shave; John Turner	Jidenna	3:46
3.	"Yoga" (with Jidenna)	Janelle Monáe Robinson; Mobisson; Tuffuor; Irvin III; Joseph II; Tannis; Wiley; Irvin	Janelle Monáe	3:37
4.	"Going Nowhere"	Carissa Murray; Alexandria Rosemond; Joshua Dean; Irvin III	St. Beauty	3:19
5.	"iKnow"	Irvin	Roman GianArthur	3:02
6.	"Classic Man" (Remix, featuring Kendrick Lamar)	Mobisson; Tuffuor; Irvin III; Sehra; Wiley; Irvin; Tannis; Aitchison; Astacio; Kelly; McKenzie; Pebworth; Shave; Turner; Kendrick Duckworth	Jidenna	3:55
Total length:				21:39

== Charts ==
Chart (2015)	Peak position
US Billboard 200	22
US Top R&B/Hip-Hop Albums (Billboard)	5
