= Nana Kwabena Tuffuor =

American producer and musician (born 1986)

Nana Kwabena
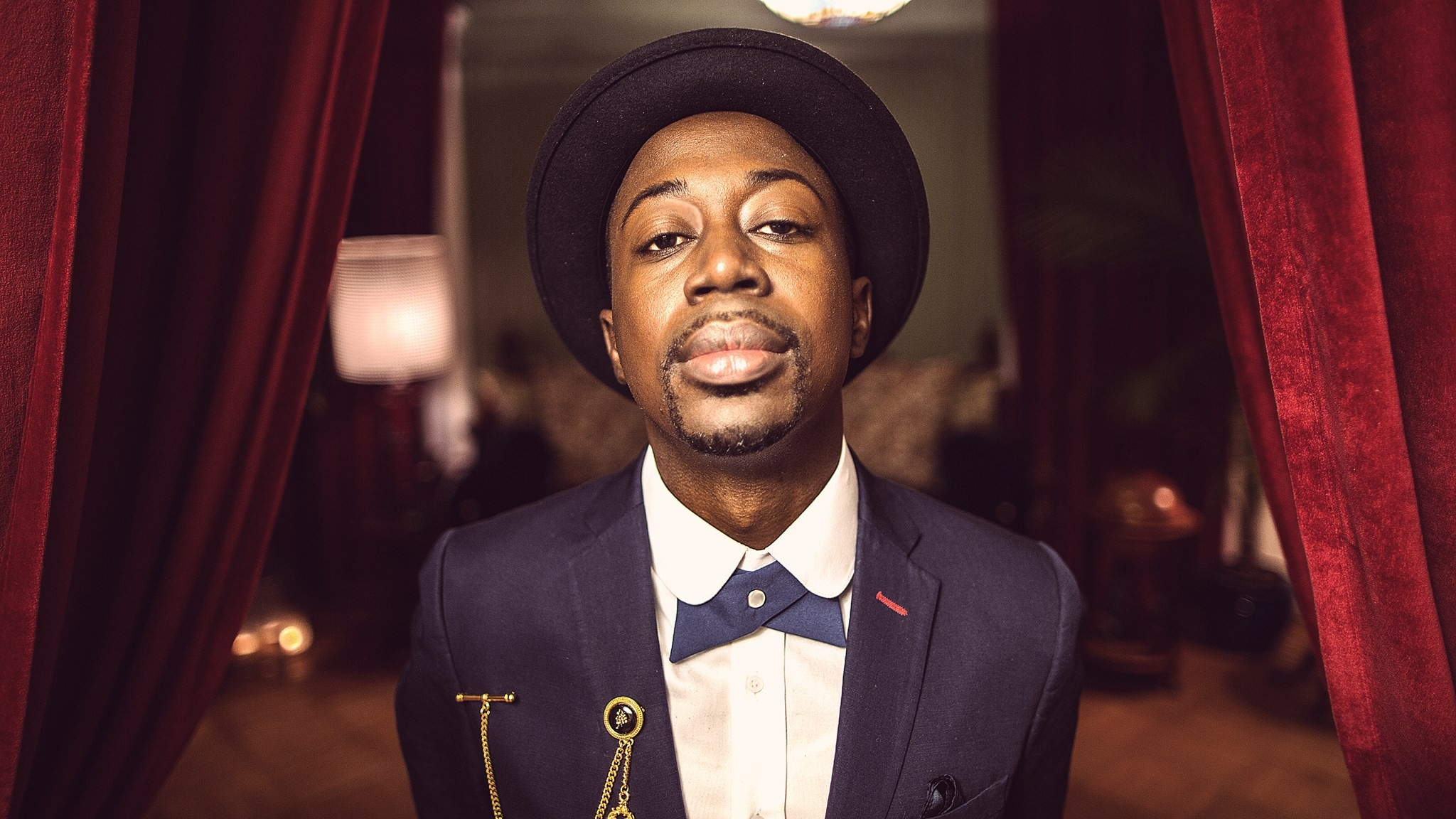
- Nana Kwabena in Fear & Fancy Studios, 2014

Background information
- Also known as: Nana Kwabena; NANA
- Born: Nana Kwabena Tuffuor; March 25, 1986 (age 40); Cleveland, Ohio, United States
- Origin: Ghana
- Genres: Hip hop; R&B; world; pop
- Occupations: Record producer; rapper; singer; songwriter; DJ; sound engineer
- Instruments: Drums; percussion; keyboard; logic pro; pro tools; vocals
- Years active: 2009–present
- Label: Wondaland
- Website: nanakwabena.com

Nana Kwabena Tuffuor (born March 25, 1986) is an American record producer, rapper, singer, songwriter, DJ and sound engineer. He is most noted for co-producing Jidenna's certified platinum single, "Classic Man." In 2015, the song was nominated for a Grammy at the 58th annual Grammy Awards for Best Rap/Sung Collaboration. Tuffuor also co-produced "Made To Love" by John Legend and "Yoga," featuring Jidenna and Janelle Monáe.

As a music producer, Nana Kwabena has collaborated with Jidenna, Janelle Monáe, John Legend, Kanye West, Rick Ross, Kimbra, Kendrick Lamar, Seun Kuti, Mr Eazi, Goldlink and Quavo.

Following his younger brother's passing from Sickle Cell Disease in 2011, Nana Kwabena founded AllOneBlood in 2012, a nonprofit organization dedicated to raising awareness of the disease.

Nana joined Fear & Fancy Social Club and Arts Collective in 2012.

== Early life and education ==
Tuffuor was born in Cleveland, Ohio. Tuffuor's mother is an accountant and founder of an elementary school in Ghana and his father is a computer engineer and entrepreneur.

Nana grew up in Philadelphia, Pennsylvania. He attended high school at George School.

Nana Kwabena graduated from the University of Pennsylvania in 2008 as a pre-med student with a Bachelor of Arts degree in Health & Societies and a minor in both Sociology and Africana Studies.

After deferring his acceptance into George Washington University's Milken Institute School of Public Health for a year, Tuffuor later moved from Philadelphia to New York in 2010 to pursue his music career full-time.

== Career ==
Following the passing of his younger brother, Kwame Apau, from Sickle Cell in 2011, Nana Kwabena founded the non-profit organization AllOneBlood. This initiative expands public awareness of Sickle Cell disease through photo and video campaigns and celebrity hospital visits. The organization aims to raise money for existing organizations dedicated to finding a universal cure for the disease.

Tuffuor is a member of Fear & Fancy, a social club that began in California in 2006. The society, reminiscent of the social aid and pleasure clubs of New Orleans, is an international collective of entrepreneurs, activists, educators, scientists, and artists who host soirees, dinner parties, and demonstrations.

== Personal life ==
Tuffuor currently resides in East Flatbush, Brooklyn.

Tuffuor supports several initiatives for social justice, especially pertaining to African Americans. He joined Janelle Monáe, Jidenna and other Wondaland artists in leading demonstrations to support the Black Lives Matter movement during the Wondaland Eephus Tour.

== Production credits ==
=== Elliot Yamin – Fight For Love ===
- 12. "Someday" (Drum Programming)

=== John Legend – Love in the Future ===
- 02. "The Beginning" (Drum Programming)
- 04. "Made To Love feat. Kimbra" (Producer, composer, engineer, Drum Programming, Programming)
- 05. "Who Do We Think We Are feat. Rick Ross" (Additional Producer, Drum Programming)
- 08. "Save The Night" (Drum Programming)
- 14. "You & I (Nobody in the World)" (Drum Programming)
- 15. "Asylum" (Drum Programming)

=== Wondaland – The Eephus ===
- 02. Jidenna – "Classic Man feat. Roman GianArthur" (Producer, composer, Drum Programming, Background Vocals, Arrangement)
- 03. Janelle Monáe – "Yoga feat. Jidenna" (Producer, composer, Drum Programming, Background Vocals, Arrangement)

=== Jidenna ===
- 00. "Long Live The Chief" (Lyrics, Arrangement, Recording Engineer)
- 00. "Extraordinaire" (Producer, composer, Arrangement, Drum Programming, Background Vocals, Synthesizers, Recording Engineer)
- 00. "Knickers" (Producer, composer, Arrangement, Drum Programming, Background Vocals, Synthesizers, Vocoders, Recording Engineer)

=== Jidenna ===
- 00. "Chief Don't Run" (Producer, composer, Arrangement, Lead Vocals, Background Vocals, Drum Programming, Programming, Recording Engineer)
- 00. "Little Bit More" (Producer, composer, Arrangement, Drum Programming, Palmas Handclaps)

=== Desiigner ===
- 00. "Timmy Turner Remix" (Additional Producer, Drum Programming)

=== Jidenna – The Chief ===
- 01. "A Bull's Tale" (Producer, composer, Arrangement, Synthesizer, Drum Programming, Programming, Sound Effects, Recording Engineer, Mixing Engineer)
- 02. "Chief Don't Run featuring Roman GianArthur" (Producer, composer, Arrangement, Lead Vocals, Background Vocals, Drum Programming, Programming, Recording Engineer)
- 03. "Trampoline" (Producer, composer, Arrangement, Drum Programming, Programming, Sound Effects, Recording Engineer)
- 04. "Bambi" (Co-Producer, composer, Arrangement, Drum Programming, Programming, Mixing Engineer)
- 05. "Helicopters / Beware" (Producer, composer, Arrangement, Background Vocals, Synthesizer, Drum Programming, Programming, Recording Engineer, Mixing Engineer)
- 06. "Long Live The Chief" (Lyrics, Arrangement, Recording Engineer)
- 07. "2 Points" (Co-Producer, Arrangement, Drum Programming, Programming, Recording Engineer)
- 08. "The Let Out featuring Nana Kwabena" (Producer, Featured Artist, Lead Vocals, composer, Arrangement, Synthesizer, Drum Programming, Programming, Recording Engineer)
- 09. "Safari featuring Janelle Monáe, St. Beauty and Nana Kwabena" (Co-Producer, Featured Artist, Lead Vocals, Vocal Production, composer, Arrangement, Programming, Recording Engineer)
- 10. "Adaora" (Producer, composer, Arrangement, Synthesizer, Drum Programming, Programming, Mixing Engineer)
- 11. "Little Bit More" (Producer, composer, Arrangement, Drum Programming, Palmas Handclaps)
- 12. "Some Kind of Way" (Producer, composer, Arrangement, Synthesizer, Drum Programming, Programming, Recording Engineer)
- 13. "White N****s" (Producer, composer, Arrangement, Drum Programming, Programming, Sound Effects, Mixing Engineer)
- 14. "Bully of the Earth" (Producer, composer, Arrangement, Drum Programming, Programming, Recording Engineer, Mixing Engineer)
