= Jidenna =

Nigerian-American rapper, singer and songwriter

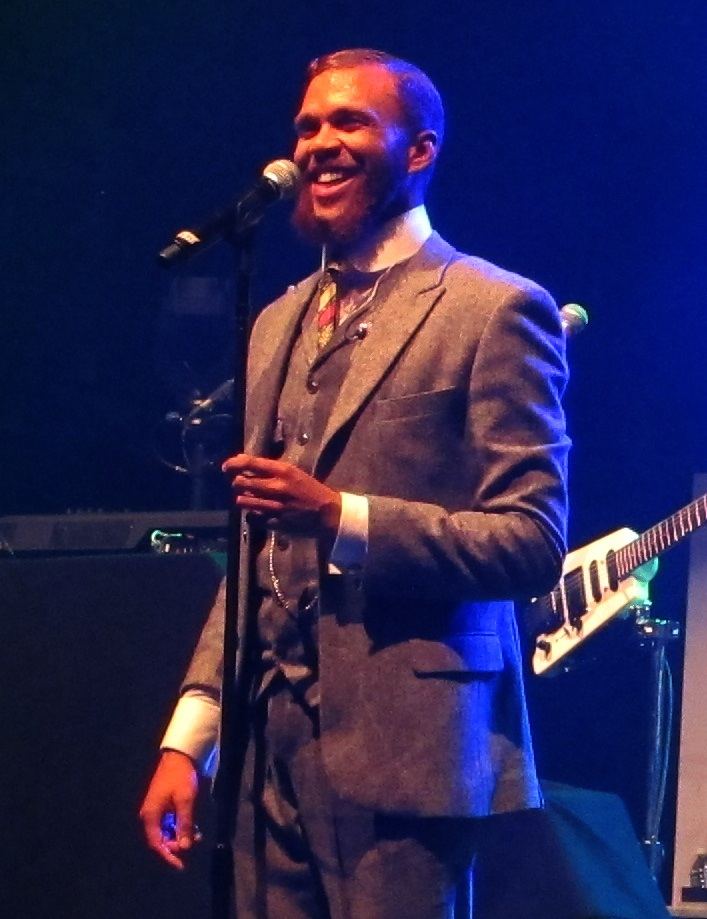
- Jidenna performing in 2015

Background information
- Born: Jidenna Theodore Mobisson; May 4, 1985 (age 41); Wisconsin Rapids, Wisconsin, U.S.
- Genres: Alternative hip-hop; R&B; pop rap
- Occupations: Rapper; singer; songwriter
- Works: Jidenna discography
- Years active: 2015–present
- Labels: Fear & Fancy; Wondaland; Epic
- Website: jidenna.com

Jidenna Theodore Mobisson (born May 4, 1985), known mononymously as Jidenna, is an American rapper, singer and songwriter. He signed with Janelle Monáe's record label Wondaland Arts Society, an imprint of Epic Records to release his 2015 debut single, "Classic Man" (featuring Roman GianArthur or Kendrick Lamar). The song peaked at number 22 on the Billboard Hot 100, received double platinum certification by the Recording Industry Association of America (RIAA), and was followed by the single "Yoga" (with Janelle Monáe) that same year. Both songs preceded the release of Wondaland's collective project, The Eephus (2015). Jidenna's debut studio album, The Chief (2017), peaked at number 38 on the Billboard 200. His second album, 85 to Africa (2019), explored afro fusion.

"Classic Man" received a Grammy Award nomination for Best Rap/Sung Performance, while Jidenna won in four categories at the 2015 Soul Train Music Awards.

== Early life and education ==
Jidenna Theodore Mobisson was born on May 4, 1985, in Wisconsin Rapids, Wisconsin, to Tama Mobisson, a White American accountant, and Oliver Mobisson, a Nigerian Igbo academic. Mobisson grew up partially in Nigeria, where his father was working as a professor of computer science at Enugu State University. When Mobisson was six years old, the family moved back to the United States due to a failed kidnapping attempt. In 1995, the family moved to Norwood, Massachusetts, and then to Milton in 2000. His father died in 2010.

In high school he became a co-founder of the rap group Black Spadez, and began producing, arranging and writing. Mobisson released his first album with Black Spadez as their final project at Milton Academy, where Mobisson graduated in 2003. In 2008, after graduating with a Bachelor of Arts degree in Comparative Studies in Race and Ethnicity from Stanford University, he pursued his music career while working full-time as a teacher, moving between Los Angeles, Oakland, Brooklyn and Atlanta, before signing a deal with recording artist Janelle Monáe's Wondaland Records.

== Career ==
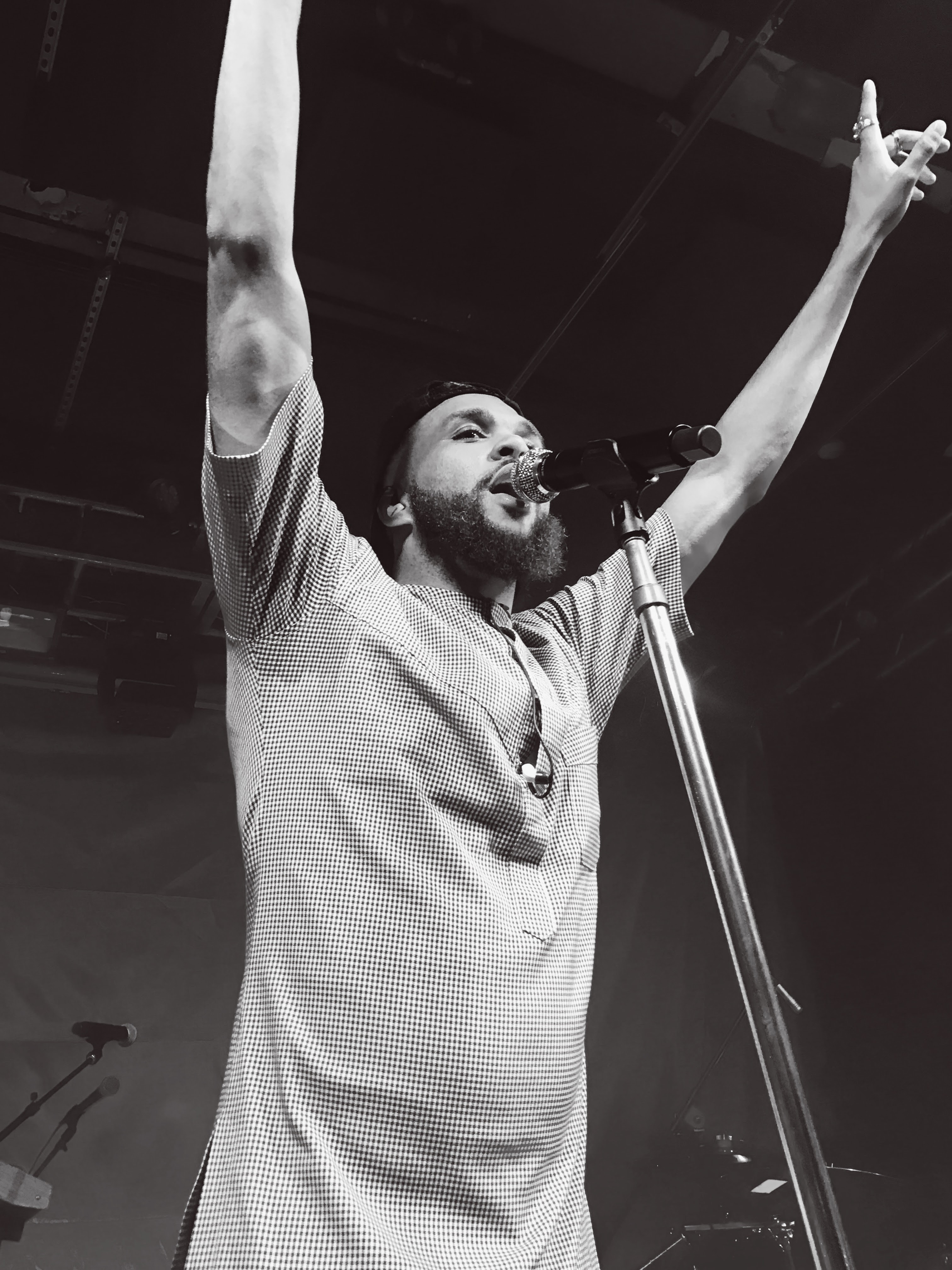
Jidenna performing in Seattle

Jidenna is signed to Janelle Monáe's Wondaland Records label and distributed through Epic Records. He has collaborated with a number of artists that are signed to this label; including Roman GianArthur, St. Beauty, Deep Cotton and Janelle Monáe herself, and then began recording a five-song compilation of its label's first extended play (EP), titled The Eephus. In February 2015, Jidenna released his first official single, called "Classic Man" featuring GianArthur. The song was in heavy rotation throughout the United States, and debuted at number 49 on Billboard Hot R&B/Hip-Hop Airplay chart.

On March 31, 2015, the second single from the EP was released – "Yoga" by Janelle Monáe and Jidenna. His song "Classic Man" was nominated for Best Rap/Sung Collaboration at the 58th Grammy Awards. In June of the same year, Jidenna performed the song with Monáe at the BET Awards. Jidenna also received an award for best new artist at the 2015 Soul Train Music Awards in November.

Jidenna is a founding member of Fear & Fancy, a social club that began in California in 2006. The society, reminiscent of the social aid and pleasure clubs of New Orleans, is an international collective of entrepreneurs, activists, educators, scientists, and artists who host soirees, dinner parties, and demonstrations.

In June 2016 he released the single "Chief Don't Run". On February 17, 2017, Jidenna released The Chief, his first studio album. The album cover pays homage to Boz Scaggs' Middle Man album. The lead singles "Sufi Woman" and "Tribe" were released on July 26, 2019, and will appear on his second studio album 85 to Africa.

In 2019 Jidenna released his second album, 85 to Africa.

In 2021, Jidenna co-wrote "Woman" from rapper Doja Cat's album Planet Her. The single became a sleeper hit, charting in the top 10 of numerous international markets (United States, Denmark, France, Switzerland, Portugal, New Zealand, Greece) more than a year after release.

== Style ==
Jidenna stated that his major influences include KRS-One and Big Daddy Kane, as well as the Nigerian Highlife music genre.

Over the years, the singer developed his personal style in college, where he learned about the power of fashion from his psychology professor Philip Zimbardo. However, he would not adopt his signature dandy style until the death of his father in 2010. Jidenna describes his look as "heavily inspired by the Harlem Renaissance with hints of traditional West African design," and a "marriage of European and African aesthetics." Jidenna currently resides in East Flatbush, Brooklyn.

== Appearances in popular media ==
In September 2016, Jidenna was featured in an episode of the Netflix original series Luke Cage. Season 1 episode 5, "Just to Get a Rep", opens with Jidenna performing "Long Live the Chief" at the fictitious Harlem's Paradise. He performed "Long Live the Chief" and "Little Bit More" with a full band on The Daily Show with Trevor Noah in October 2016. Jidenna guest starred on Insecure in the episodes "Thirsty as Fuck," and "Shady as Fuck," which aired in November 2016.

A chopped and screwed version of "Classic Man" was featured in the Academy Award winning 2016 film Moonlight.

== Discography ==
=== Studio albums ===
- The Chief (2017)
- 85 to Africa (2019)
- Me You & God (2023)

=== Extended Plays ===
- Wondaland Presents: The Eephus (2015)
- Boomerang (2017)

== Awards and nominations ==
=== Grammy Awards ===
Year	Nominee / work	Award	Result
2016	"Classic Man" (featuring Roman GianArthur)	Best Rap/Sung Collaboration	Nominated
2022	Planet Her (Deluxe)	Grammy Award for Album of the Year	Nominated

=== ASFA Awards ===
Year	Nominee / work	Award	Result
2016	Crossing Borders with Fashion	Continental (Africa)	Nominated

=== BMI Awards ===
Year	Nominee / work	Award	Result
2016 BMI R&B/Hip-Hop Awards	"Classic Man"	Most Performed Songs	Won
2016 BMI London Pop Awards	"Classic Man"	Most Performed Songs	Won
2023 BMI R&B/Hip-Hop Awards	"Woman"	Most Performed Songs	Won
2023 BMI London Awards	"Woman"	Song Of The Year	Won
2023 BMI London Awards	"Woman"	Most Performed Songs	Won
2023 BMI Pop Awards	"Woman"	Most Performed Songs	Won

=== Soul Train Music Awards ===
Year	Nominee / work	Award	Result
2015	Himself	Best New Artist	Won
2015	"Classic Man" (featuring Roman GianArthur)	Song of the Year	Nominated
2015	"Classic Man" (featuring Roman GianArthur)	Video of the Year	Nominated
2015	"Yoga" (with Janelle Monáe)	Best Dance Performance	Nominated
