= Deep Cotton =

American funk duo

Deep Cotton is an American funk duo based in Atlanta, whose members are Chuck Lightning and Nate "Rocket" Wonder. Part of the Wondaland Arts Society, they are also sometimes called the "Punk Prophets".

== Music career ==
Lightning and Wonder met in 2002 at Morehouse College in Atlanta. The pair were roommates, and began collaborating when Lightning overheard Wonder playing music and started shouting to his music. Wonder said this became a competition to see who could "out-crazy" the other person, and their musical collaboration is basically a chance to do "whatever the hell we want."

They produce music, including that of Janelle Monáe, another co-founder of the Wondaland collective. They began to gain notoriety of their own after their song "We're Far Enough from Heaven Now We Can Freak Out" was featured in a Sonos commercial featuring Monáe. The single was released in October 2012.

== Personal life ==
Wonder is the older brother of Roman GianArthur, another member of the Wondaland Arts Collective.

== Discography ==
- "Runaway Radio" (2013)
- "We're Far Enough from Heaven Now We Can Freak Out" – Deep Cotton, October 2012
- "57821" – Janelle Monáe featuring Deep Cotton (from The ArchAndroid)
- "Let's Get Caught" — Deep Cotton featuring Jidenna (from Wondaland Presents: The Eephus)
