= Roman GianArthur =

American singer

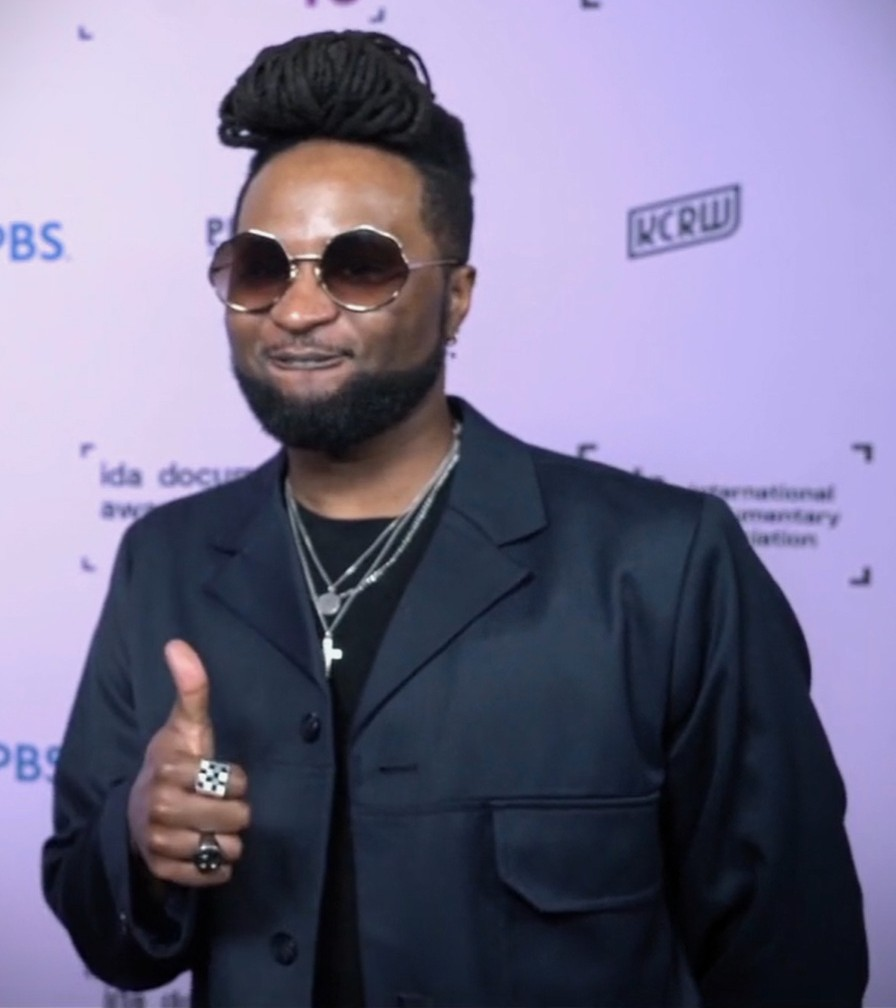
- GianArthur in 2024

Background information
- Born: Roman GianArthur Irvin; November 21, 1988 (age 37)
- Genres: R&B
- Occupations: Singer; songwriter; record producer
- Instruments: Vocals, guitar
- Years active: 2012–present
- Label: Wondaland

Roman GianArthur Irvin (born November 21, 1988) is an American singer. He is best known for his guest appearance on Jidenna's 2015 single "Classic Man", which peaked within the top 30 of the Billboard Hot 100. He is the brother of Nate Wonder; both are members of Janelle Monáe's Wondaland Arts Collective, alongside Jidenna and Nana Kwabena.

Irvin has also contributed to Monae's albums The ArchAndroid and The Electric Lady. His single "iKnow" was featured on the EP Wondaland Presents: The Eephus. In September 2015, Rolling Stone named GianArthur to a list of "10 New Artists You Need to Know."

== Discography ==
- OK LADY (2015 EP)

== Filmography ==
Year	Title	Role	Notes
2019–2020	American Soul	Ernie Isley	Episode: Just Us
2019	Lady and the Tramp	Rex	Voice
