= Ian Bohen =

American actor (born 1976)

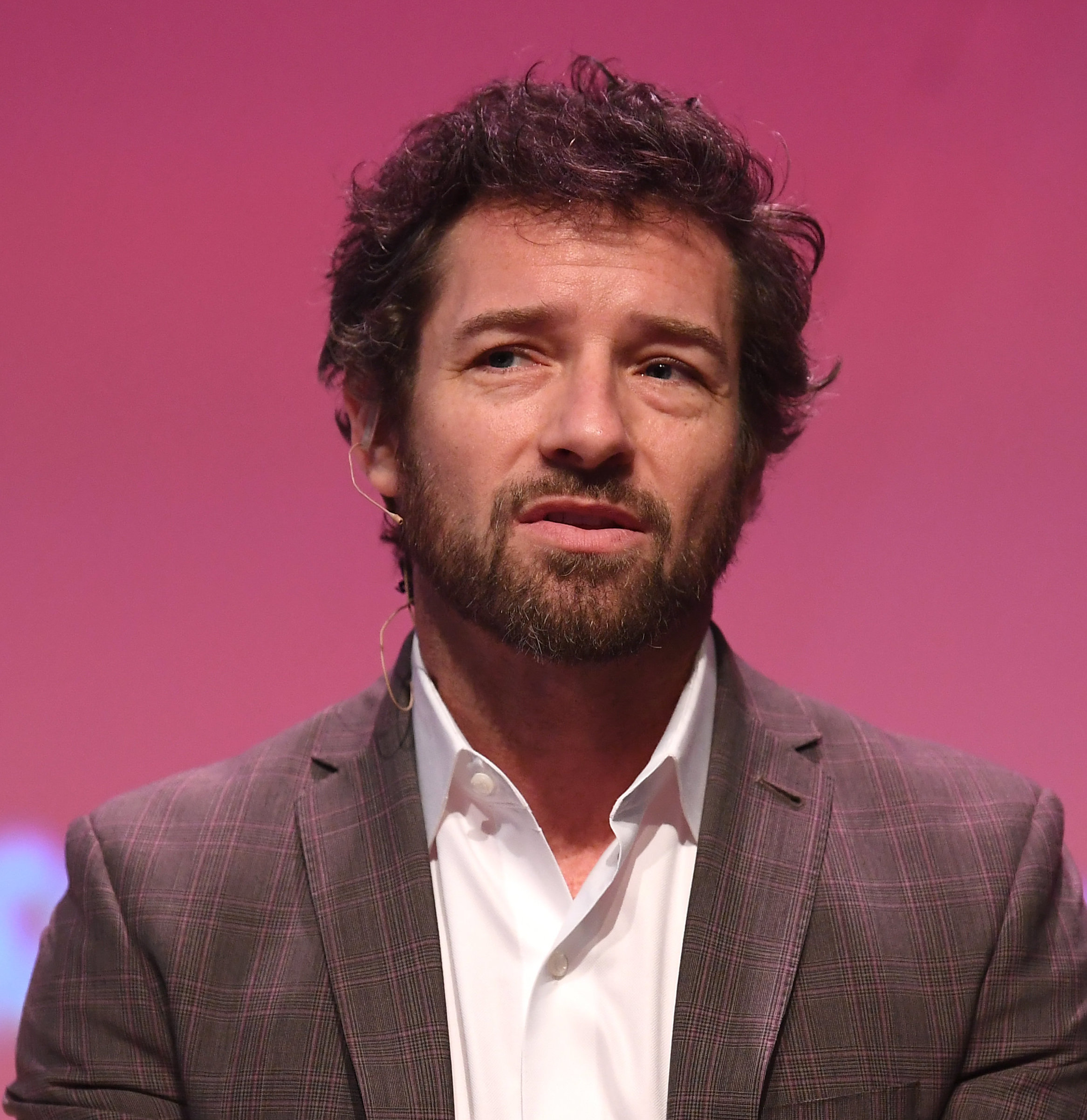
- Bohen in 2018
- Born: Ian Stuart Bohen; September 24, 1976 (age 49); Carmel, California, U.S.
- Occupations: Actor, director
- Years active: 1993–present
- Known for: Teen Wolf; Yellowstone

Ian Stuart Bohen (/ˈboʊən/ BOH-ən; born September 24, 1976) is an American actor known for his role as Peter Hale in MTV's Teen Wolf and as Ryan in Paramount Network's drama series Yellowstone. Bohen also appeared in a recurring role as Roy Hazelitt in AMC's series Mad Men.

== Life and career ==
Bohen was born and raised in Carmel, California. Since the age of 8 or 9, during the summers, he spent months at a time on his grandfather's livestock ranch in Wisconsin, where he learned to ride horses. He began his acting career in 1993, making his debut in Todd Field's AFI Conservatory project, Delivering. He followed this with a turn as "Young Earp" to Kevin Costner's "Wyatt," in Lawrence Kasdan's 1994 Oscar nominated film, Wyatt Earp.

In 1997, Bohen landed the role of Young Hercules in Hercules: The Legendary Journeys. He recurred in flashbacks as the young hero during the series. A spin-off of the popular show was made into a television movie, Young Hercules, with Bohen appearing again as Hercules in his formative years. A children's television series was later commissioned, but Bohen declined to return to the role as he was unwilling to move to New Zealand full-time. Between 1998 and 2001, he appeared in ten episodes of Any Day Now as Johnny O'Brien. He appeared in the first season of Mad Men as beatnik Roy Hazelitt, who fell in love with one of Don Draper's many women, Midge Daniels.

In 2012, Bohen guest-starred in four episodes of Major Crimes as the natural father of supporting character Rusty Beck, Daniel Dunn.

From 2011 to 2017, Bohen had a recurring role in MTV's Teen Wolf portraying Peter Hale. He appeared in 42 episodes during most of the subsequent seasons until the show's end. Bohen enjoyed the challenge of playing Hale, a morally ambiguous character. He also was proud of Teen Wolf portraying LGBT relationships on television.

In 2016, Bohen was cast in Taylor Sheridan's directorial feature film debut, Wind River. Bohen co-starred in Sicario: Day of the Soldado, the sequel to the 2015 film Sicario, directed by Denis Villeneuve. The film premiered on June 29, 2018. Starting in June 2018, Bohen has portrayed recurring character Ryan, a cowboy wrangler, in the television series Yellowstone.

Bohen appears in Little Women, a modern adaptation of Louisa May Alcott's novel of the same name, portraying Freddy Bhaer, a German professor who strikes up a friendship with Jo March. The film was released on September 28, 2018, to coincide with the book's 150th anniversary.

Bohen later recurred in the second season of Superman & Lois as Mitch Anderson.

In September 2021, it was announced that a reunion film for the 2011 Teen Wolf television series had been ordered by Paramount+, with Jeff Davis returning as a screenwriter and executive producer for the film. The majority of the original cast members, including Bohen himself, would reprise their roles. The film was released on January 26, 2023.

In February 2024, Bohen starred in James Bamford's action thriller Air Force One Down alongside Katherine McNamara.

== Filmography ==
=== Film ===
Year	Film	Role	Notes
1993	Delivering	Jimmy Wakefield	Short film
1994	Wyatt Earp	Young Wyatt	
1995	Monster Mash	Scott	
1998	Young Hercules	Young Hercules	
2001	Pearl Harbor	Radar operator #1	
2002	Hometown Legend	Brian Schuler	
2006	Special	Ted Exiler	
2007	Marigold	Barry	Also known as Marigold: An Adventure in India
2010	Irreversi	Adam	
2011	Vile	Julian	
2012	The Dark Knight Rises	Cop with Gordon	
2013	5 Souls	Noah	
2017	Wind River	Evan	
2018	Sicario: Day of the Soldado	Carson Wills	
2018	Little Women	Freddy Bhaer	
2023	Teen Wolf: The Movie	Peter Hale	
2024	Air Force One Down	President Edwards	

=== Television ===
Year	Show	Role	Notes
1994	Weird Science	Jeremy Scanlon	Episode: "Camp Wannabe"
1995	Walker, Texas Ranger	Keith Reno	Episode: "War Zone"
1995	Dr. Quinn, Medicine Woman	Cole Younger	Episode: "Baby Outlaws"
1996	Boy Meets World	Denny	Episode: "Life Lessons"
1996	Picket Fences	Russell "Doze" Feuer	Episode: "Liver Let Die"
1996	Her Last Chance	Matt Arnold	Television film
1996	If These Walls Could Talk	Scott Barrows	Television film
1996	Townies	Jeremy	Episode: "It's Go Time"
1997	Baywatch Nights	Teen	Episode: "Zargtha"
1997–1998	Hercules: The Legendary Journeys	Young Hercules	Recurring role
1998	Beyond Belief: Fact or Fiction	Son	Guest role; 2 episodes
1998	Dawson's Creek	Anderson Crawford	Episode: "Kiss"
1998	To Have & to Hold	Reed Sanderson	Episode: "Driveway to Heaven"
1998–2001	Any Day Now	Johnny O'Brien	Recurring role
2004	JAG	PO Thurmond	Episode: "Trojan Horse"
2004	Cold Case	Nelson Miller 1943	Episode: "Factory Girls"
2004	Joan of Arcadia	Peter	Episode: "Wealth of Nations"
2007	Mad Men	Roy Hazelitt	Episodes: "The Hobo Code" & "Babylon"
2009	Prison Break	Darrin Hooks	Episode: "Cowboys and Indians"
2010	CSI: Miami	Doug	Episode: "Manhunt"
2011	Drop Dead Diva	Handsome man	Episode: "Hit and Run"
2011	Body of Proof	Mitch Barnes	Episode: "Gross Anatomy"
2011–2017	Teen Wolf	Peter Hale	Recurring role (seasons 1–4, 6)
2012	Breakout Kings	Pete Gillies	Recurring role
2012	The Mentalist	Richard Eldridge	Episode: "War Of The Roses"
2012	Major Crimes	Daniel Dunn	Recurring role
2013	CSI: Crime Scene Investigation	Thomas Pope / Johnathan Harris	Episode: "Ghosts of the Past"
2013	The Client List	Adam	Episode: "When I Say I Do"
2014	Beauty & the Beast	Pete Franco	Episode: "Ancestors"
2014	Chicago P.D.	Edwin Stillwell	Recurring role
2018–2024	Yellowstone	Ryan	Recurring role (seasons 1–3); main role (season 4)
2022	Superman & Lois	Mitch Anderson, Bizarro Mitch Anderson	Recurring role; 8 episodes
2026	Lioness	Grady	Recurring role; 3 episodes

=== Music videos ===
Year	Title	Artist	Ref.
2016	"Where's the Love"	Black Eyed Peas (featuring The World)	
2018	"Give Me Your Hand"	Shannon K	

=== Director ===
Year	Title	Notes
2011	Morning Love	Short film; also cinematographer and editor
2016	The Tow	Short film; also writer

== Awards and nominations ==
Year	Award	Category	Work	Result	Ref.
2009	Action on Film Award	Male Action Performer of the Year	Interpretation	Nominated	
2017	Saturn Awards	Best Guest Performance in a Television Series	Teen Wolf	Nominated	
