= Justin Carmack =

American child actor (1981–2000)

Justin Mathew Carmack
- Born: March 12, 1981
- Died: July 20, 2000 (aged 19); Los Angeles, California, United States
- Occupation: Actor
- Years active: 1993–2000
- Relatives: Ciaran Carmack (brother), Georgiana Carmack (sister)
- Family: Joan Carmack (mother), Michael Carmack (father)

Justin Matthew Carmack (March 12, 1981 – July 20, 2000) was an American child actor, known for his appearance in the television series Full House.

He died on July 20, 2000, in a car accident in Los Angeles, California. He was buried in the Santa Ana Cemetery.

== Filmography ==
=== Television ===
Year	Title	Character	Notes
1994	Full House	Scott	Episode: "Is It True About Stephanie?"

=== Film ===
Year	Title	Character	Notes
1993	Delivering	Chris Wakefield	Short film
