= Some Freaks =

2016 American film

- Film poster
- Directed by: Ian MacAllister-McDonald
- Written by: Ian MacAllister-McDonald
- Produced by: Tim Harms
- Starring: Thomas Mann; Lily Mae Harrington; Ely Henry
- Cinematography: Joe Zizzo
- Edited by: Jonathan Melin
- Music by: Walter Sickert
- Production company: Mountainview Creative
- Distributed by: Good Deed Entertainment
- Release dates: July 24, 2016 (Fantasia International Film Festival); August 4, 2017
- Running time: 97 minutes
- Country: United States
- Language: English

Some Freaks is a 2016 American film written and directed by Ian MacAllister-McDonald and starring Thomas Mann, Marin Ireland, and Lily Mae Harrington. A romantic drama, it follows the romance between Matt, a one-eyed high school teenager falling in love with an overweight classmate, Jill.

== Plot ==
Three oddball friends attend Benjamin Franklin High School in Rhode Island. Jill is punk and overweight at 250 pounds; Matt comes from a poor background and only has one eye, wearing a skin-colored eyepatch; and Elmo, who is short and unattractive, is gay. When Matt and Jill begin to date and explore their teen sexuality, Elmo feels even more isolated. After graduation, Jill goes off to California and secretly loses 50 pounds over the course of six months. Matt is a dishwasher in a hometown restaurant and uses his wages to buy a prosthetic eye. Elmo is still in the closet and secretly admires Justin, a basketball player from high school that he had a crush on, who goes to his college.

Matt visits Jill at her west coast campus and is surprised by her weight loss, whereas she, in turn, is surprised by his prosthetic. As Matt's weeklong stay with Jill progresses, it becomes apparent that he doesn't support Jill's new healthy lifestyle. This culminates in Matt attempting to trick Jill into eating carb-loaded and fatty foods and then trying to force-feed her when she refuses. This sparks a fight between the two and they break up, with Jill telling Matt never to contact her again.

The popular and good-looking Patrick, who went to high school with the three, asks Jill out on a date, which she rejects. She gets a follow-up note, and a second request from Patrick, slipped under her door. She talks it over with her college friends and decides to attend after another friend warns her that the fraternity party is called the "Cattle Call": Fraternity men invite overweight girls over to be weighed publicly. There is also an expectation of drinking and sex at the party. Jill goes with Patrick to the fraternity party but refuses to be weighed. Patrick supports her and pushes the person attempting to forcibly weigh her. Patrick's older brother reminds him this is all in fun, hands him a key, and insinuates that he and Jill must go upstairs and have sex as the girls know that this is their one night of sex with someone conventionally attractive. Patrick and Jill go upstairs but Patrick has difficulty getting erect and Jill leaves without having sex with him. On her way out, she sees Patrick's older brother getting oral sex and he winks, telling her to enjoy her night.

Back in Rhode Island, Matt and Elmo attend a "Boys Will Be Girls" themed costume party. Matt meets Toni who tells him he is not her type and just too normal for her taste. In anger, he takes out his eye and asks if his one eye is weird enough for her. She initially finds his prosthetic eye cool, however, after Matt gets extremely drunk and begins to show off his eye, she tells him he is too pathetic to fuck. At the same party, Elmo finds his secret love, Justin. Elmo tells Justin that there are too many fags at this party and they leave to drink elsewhere. Later in Elmo's bedroom, Justin falls asleep drunk. Elmo kisses him, and Justin, while in his drunken state, kisses him back, unaware that he is kissing Elmo. Justin wakes up, realizes what has happened and, in anger, hits Elmo in the head with a baseball bat.

Matt rushes to the hospital to find his friend Elmo in intensive care. Jill walks into the waiting room shortly after. Matt attempts to apologize but Jill asks him not to speak to her. Matt then sits down beside her and rests his head on her shoulder. Jill rests her head on Matt's head. Elmo's fate is left unknown.

== Cast ==
- Thomas Mann as Matt Ledbetter
- Lily Mae Harrington as Jill Delisle
- Ely Henry as Elmo Moss
- Lachlan Buchanan as Patrick Keever
- John Thorsen as Justin Linksy
- Shannon Hartman as Toni
- Matt Russell as Head Senior
- Marin Ireland as Georgia Ledbetter - Matt's Sister

== Release and reception ==
Some Freaks premiered at the 2016 Fantasia International Film Festival. The film had a limited release in the United States on August 4, 2017. As of August 2020, 92% of the twelve reviews compiled by Rotten Tomatoes are positive, with an average score of 7/10.
