= Delivering (film) =

- Directed by: William Field
- Screenplay by: William Field
- Based on: Delivering by Andre Dubus
- Produced by: Michael G. Levin
- Starring: Ian Bohen; Justin Carmack
- Cinematography: Stöps Langensteiner
- Edited by: Frank Reynolds
- Music by: Kronos Quartet
- Release date: 1993
- Running time: 24 minutes
- Country: United States
- Language: English
- Budget: $400.00

Delivering is a 1993 short film by American filmmaker Todd Field (using his first name William), while a fellow at the AFI Conservatory. Adapted from the story of the same name by Andre Dubus, it is a dramatic piece that takes place on the day brothers Jimmy (Ian Bohen) and Chris (Justin Carmack) discover their mother has abandoned the family.

The film is notable as it was the first time Field adapted Dubus' work. The next would be his Academy Award-nominated feature debut, In the Bedroom, based on Dubus' short story, Killings. Years after Field's graduation from the AFI, Delivering continued to be screened in the classroom.

== Cast ==
- Ian Bohen as Jimmy
- Justin Carmack as Chris
- Danni Wheeler as Dottie
- David Hayward as Dad
