= Lady and the Tramp (2019 film) =

Film by Charlie Bean

- Official release poster
- Directed by: Charlie Bean
- Screenplay by: Andrew Bujalski; Kari Granlund
- Based on: Lady and the Tramp by Erdman Penner, Joe Rinaldi, Ralph Wright, and Don DaGradi; Happy Dan, the Cynical Dog by Ward Greene
- Produced by: Brigham Taylor
- Starring: Tessa Thompson; Justin Theroux; Kiersey Clemons; Thomas Mann; Janelle Monáe; F. Murray Abraham; Yvette Nicole Brown; Adrian Martinez; Ken Jeong; Sam Elliott
- Cinematography: Enrique Chediak
- Edited by: Melissa Bretherton
- Music by: Joseph Trapanese
- Production companies: Walt Disney Pictures; Taylor Made
- Distributed by: Walt Disney Studios; Motion Pictures
- Release date: November 12, 2019 (United States)
- Running time: 104 minutes
- Country: United States
- Language: English
- Budget: $60 million

Lady and the Tramp is a 2019 American musical romance film and a live-action/animated remake of Walt Disney's 1955 animated film, which was based on the 1945 Cosmopolitan short story, "Happy Dan, the Cynical Dog" by Ward Greene. Produced by Walt Disney Pictures, it was directed by Charlie Bean and written by Andrew Bujalski and Kari Granlund, and stars the voices of Tessa Thompson, Justin Theroux, Janelle Monáe, and Sam Elliott with Thomas Mann, Kiersey Clemons, Yvette Nicole Brown, F. Murray Abraham, Adrian Martinez, and Ken Jeong in live-action roles. It is dedicated to storyboard artist Chris Reccardi, who died on May 2, 2019.

Lady and the Tramp was released on November 12, 2019 on Disney+, making it the first Disney remake not to be released theatrically, but instead only on a streaming service. The film received mixed reviews from critics.

== Plot ==
On Christmas Day, "Jim Dear" gives his wife "Darling" an American Cocker Spaniel puppy as a present. The puppy, named Lady, grows up and befriends the neighbors' dogs: elderly Bloodhound Trusty and feisty Scottish Terrier Jacqueline, AKA "Jock".

Meanwhile, a Schnauzer-mix named Tramp roams the streets, stealing food and causing trouble for local dogcatcher Elliot, who has labeled Tramp "vicious" and is intent on catching him. Tramp hides out in Lady's neighborhood. Having been shooed away from Darling's baby shower by Darling's aunt Sarah and not realizing why her owners are neglecting her, Lady mistakes Tramp's voice for Trusty's and confides in him. Tramp deduces that Darling is pregnant, and warns Lady that "when a baby moves in, a dog moves out". Upon discovering Tramp's identity, Lady sends him away and dismisses his claims. After the baby girl Lulu is born, the couple becomes busier than ever and Lady begins to wonder if Tramp was right.

Later, Jim Dear and Darling leave for an extended visit to Jim Dear's sister and ask Aunt Sarah to dog-sit. While Aunt Sarah is upstairs, her two Devon Rex cats demolish the living room and pin the deed on Lady. Aunt Sarah immediately takes Lady to a pet store to fit a muzzle. Frightened, Lady escapes into an alley, and is confronted by vicious street dog Isaac, but Tramp saves her.

The two dogs spend the day around the city, and have spaghetti and meatballs for dinner at Tony's restaurant. Lady confesses she is doubtful whether her owners still want her, and Tramp reveals he once had owners, but was dumped after they had a child. Their conversation is interrupted by Elliot, who accidentally captures Lady instead of Tramp, and takes her to the dog pound. Two dogs named Peg and Bull discuss Tramp's self-serving nature with Lady, causing her to question why he did not save her from Elliot. Jim and Darling find Lady at the pound and bring her home, kicking out Aunt Sara and allowing Lady to bond with Lulu.

Learning that Peg and Bull have been adopted from the pound, and regretful that he could not do more to save Lady from Elliot, Tramp returns to Lady's house. Lady decides her place is with her owners, and Tramp leaves. A rat suddenly enters Lulu's nursery, and Lady starts barking frantically, just as Elliot arrives to warn Jim Dear that he has tracked Tramp to their house. Jim Dear locks Lady in a room, and Lady calls for Tramp, who returns and sneaks inside to the nursery. In the ensuing battle, Tramp is injured, but kills the rat. Lulu, whose crib was knocked over in the struggle, starts to cry loudly. Believing Tramp attacked Lulu, Jim Dear hands Tramp over to Elliot to be euthanized.

After being released, Lady leads Jim Dear and Darling to the dead rat, then sets out with Jock and Trusty to rescue Tramp. Realizing the truth, Jim Dear and Darling follow in their motorcar. Elliot's frightened horses crash his cart when the dogs attack, and Tramp is injured further. Jim Dear and Darling catch up, and adopt Tramp as their own to protect him from Elliot.

The family celebrates Christmas together, and Tramp receives his new collar and license. Outside in the yard, Trusty entertains Dodge and Ollie, two puppies adopted by Jock's owner, with the story of how he helped save "a poor stray with a heart of gold".

== Cast ==
- Thomas Mann as Jim Dear, a musician who is married to Darling.
- Kiersey Clemons as Darling, a woman who is married to Jim Dear.
- Yvette Nicole Brown as Aunt Sarah, Darling's aunt who dislikes dogs and prefers cats.
- F. Murray Abraham as Tony, the owner of Tony's Restaurant that knows Tramp.
- Adrian Martinez as Elliot, a dog catcher that constantly targets Tramp.
- Ken Jeong as the doctor who delivers Jim Dear and Darling's baby.
- Arturo Castro as Joe, a chef who works for Tony and also knows Tramp.
- Kate Kneeland as Jock's owner, an avid painter and photographer.
- Darryl W. Handy as Trusty's owner.
- Parvesh Cheena as the pet shop owner who sells Aunt Sarah a muzzle.

=== Voices ===
- Tessa Thompson as Lady, an American Cocker Spaniel.
- Justin Theroux as Tramp, a Schnauzer-mix.
- Sam Elliott as Trusty, an old Bloodhound.
- Ashley Jensen as Jock, a feisty Scottish Terrier.
- Janelle Monáe as Peg, a stray Lhasa Apso that Tramp is friends with.
- Benedict Wong as Bull, a stray Bulldog that Tramp is friends with.
- Nate "Rocket" Wonder and Roman GianArthur as Devon and Rex, Aunt Sarah's Devon Rex cats.
- Clancy Brown as Isaac, a vicious stray mastiff-mix that Tramp saves Lady from.
- Jentel Hawkins as Dame, a street dog that Lady meets in the pound.
- James Bentley as Chance, a street dog that Lady meets in the pound.
- Ara and Aemon O'Keefe as Dodge and Ollie, two con-artist puppies.

== Production ==
=== Development ===
On February 8, 2018, it was announced that Walt Disney Pictures was developing a live-action adaptation of the 1955 animated film Lady and the Tramp. The film was expected to premiere on Disney+, Disney's streaming service that launched in late 2019. On March 19, 2018, it was announced that film was set to be directed by Charlie Bean from a screenplay by Andrew Bujalski with Brigham Taylor serving as a producer.

=== Casting ===
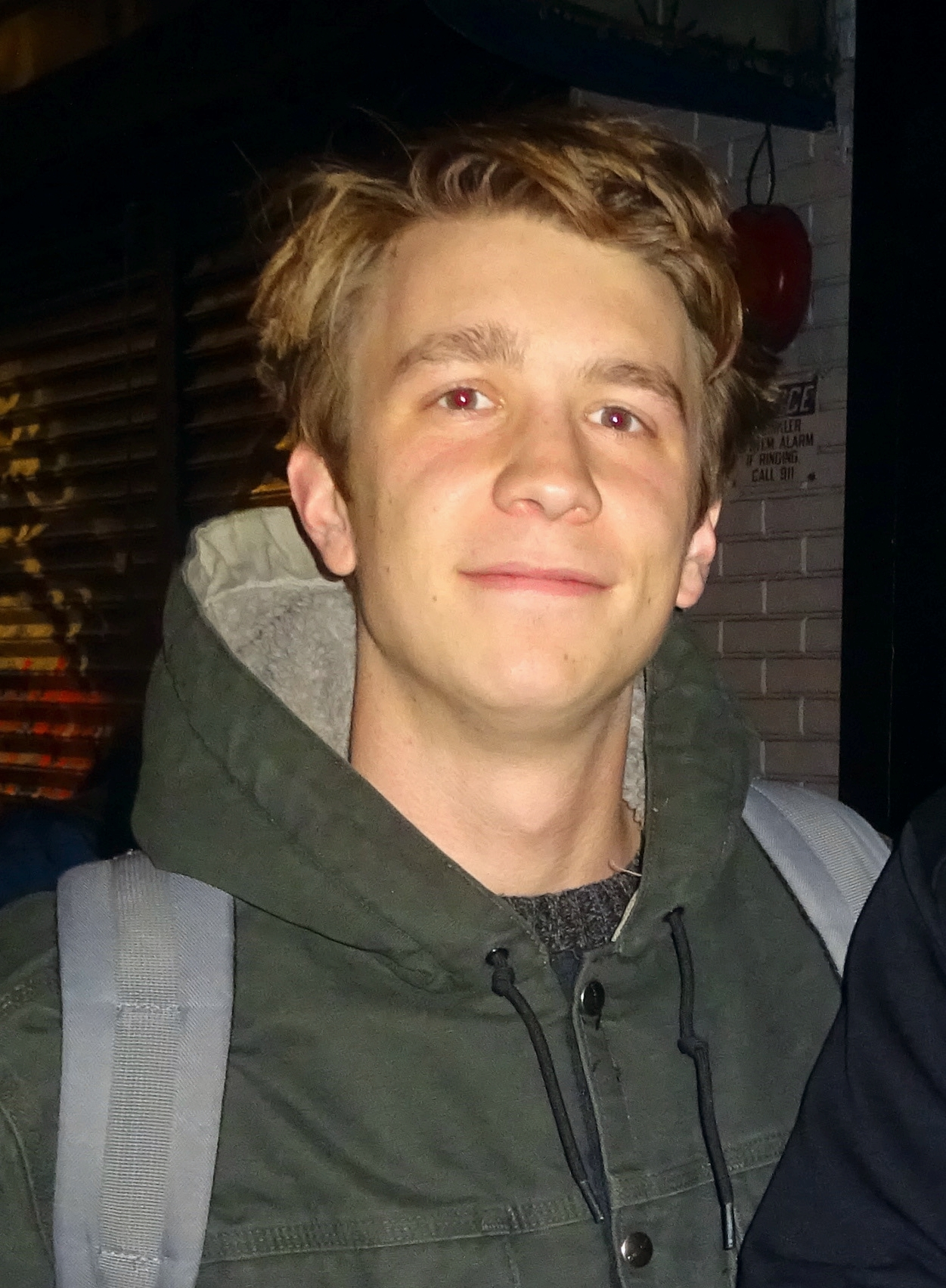
Thomas Mann
(Jim Dear)

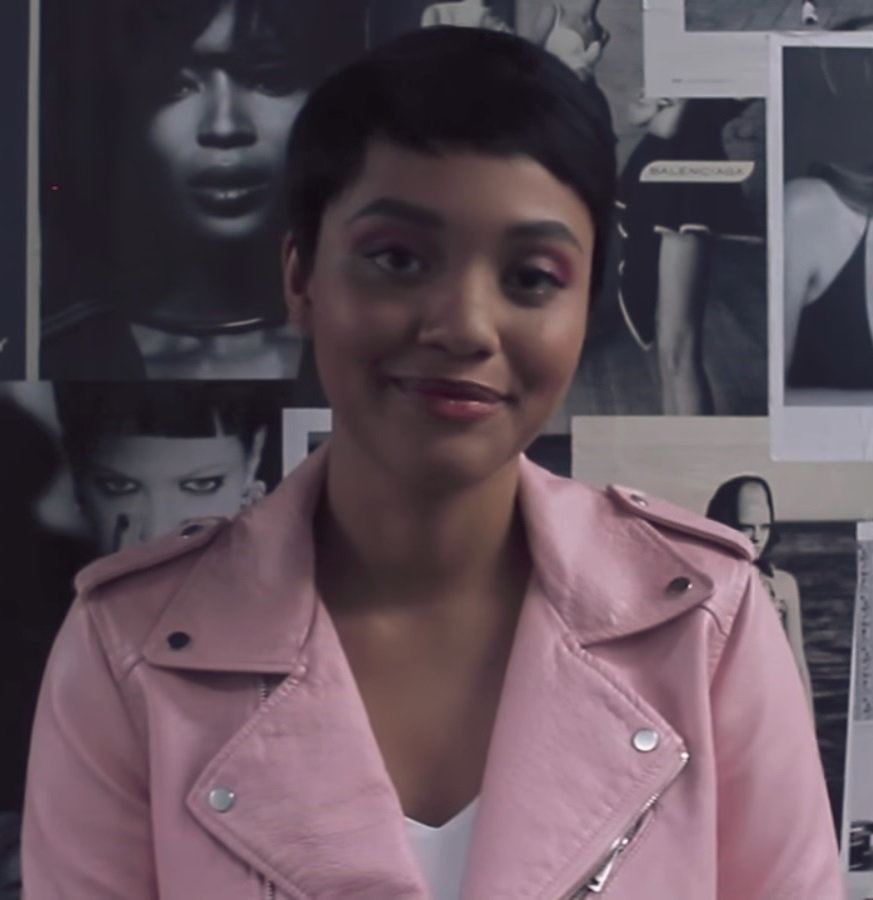
Kiersey Clemons
(Darling)

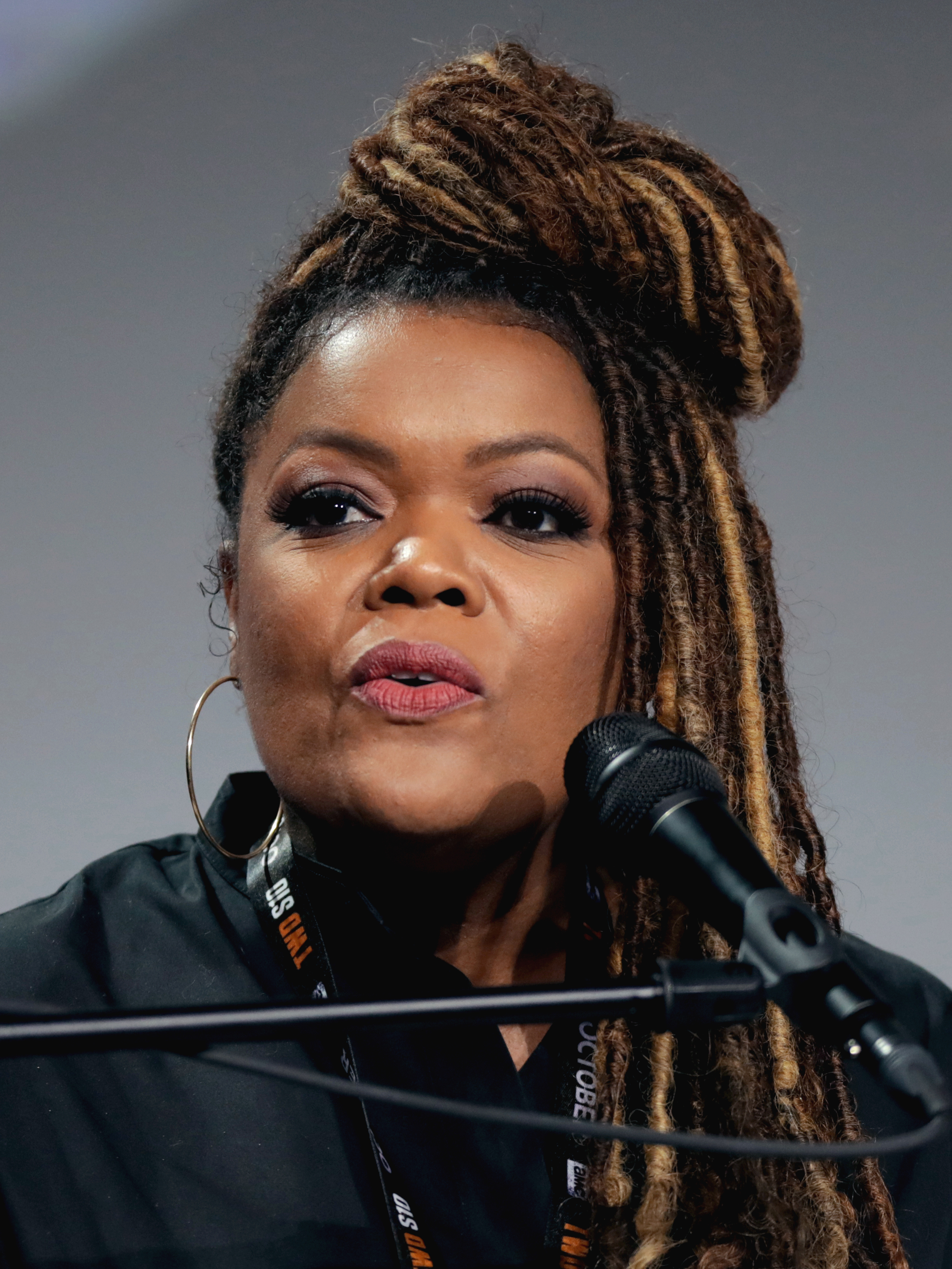
Yvette Nicole Brown
(Aunt Sarah)

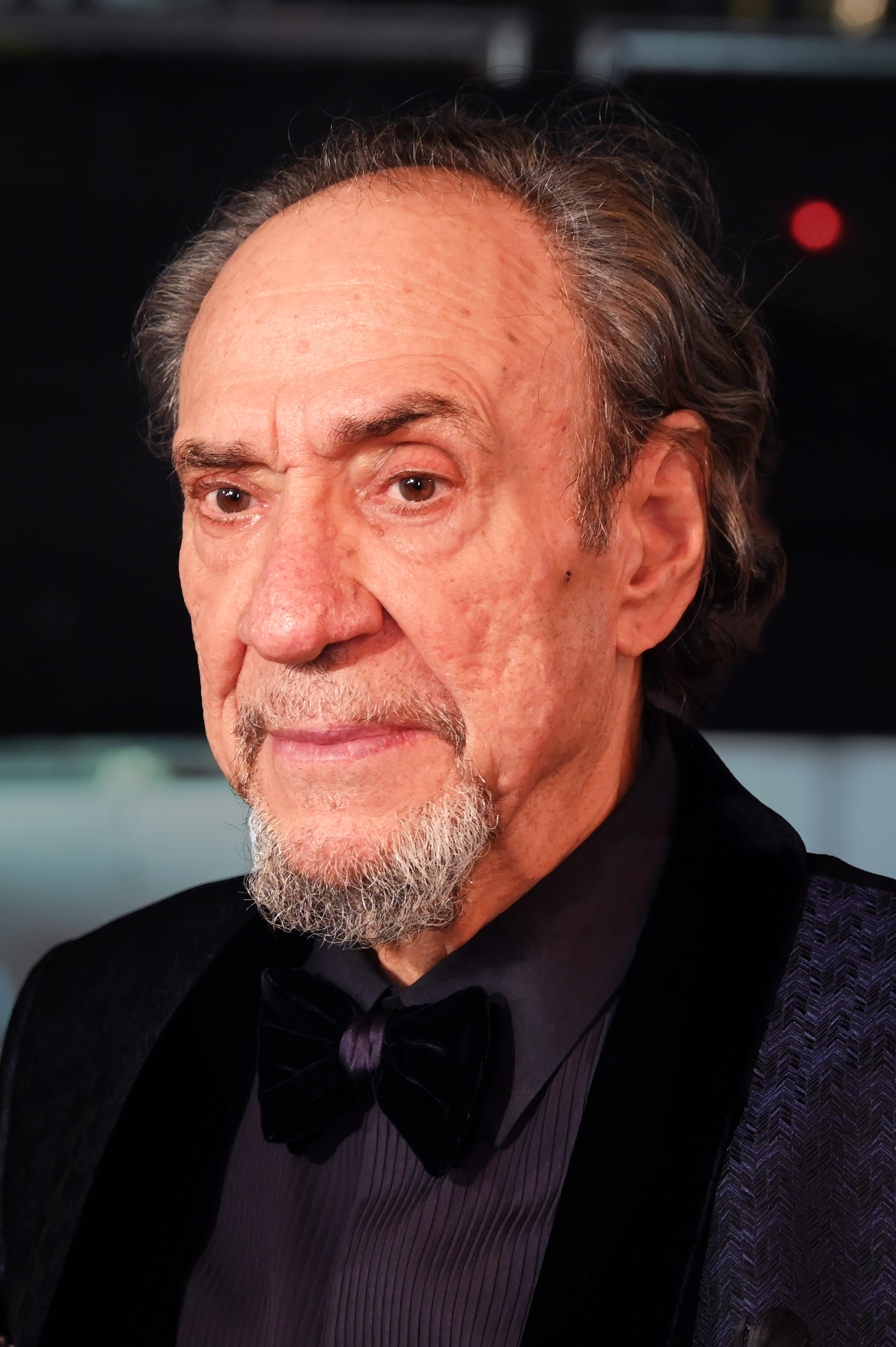
F. Murray Abraham
(Tony)

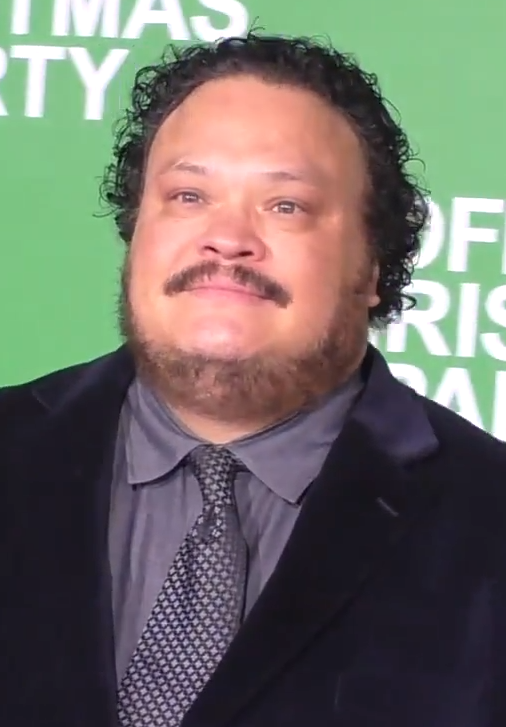
Adrian Martinez
(Elliot)

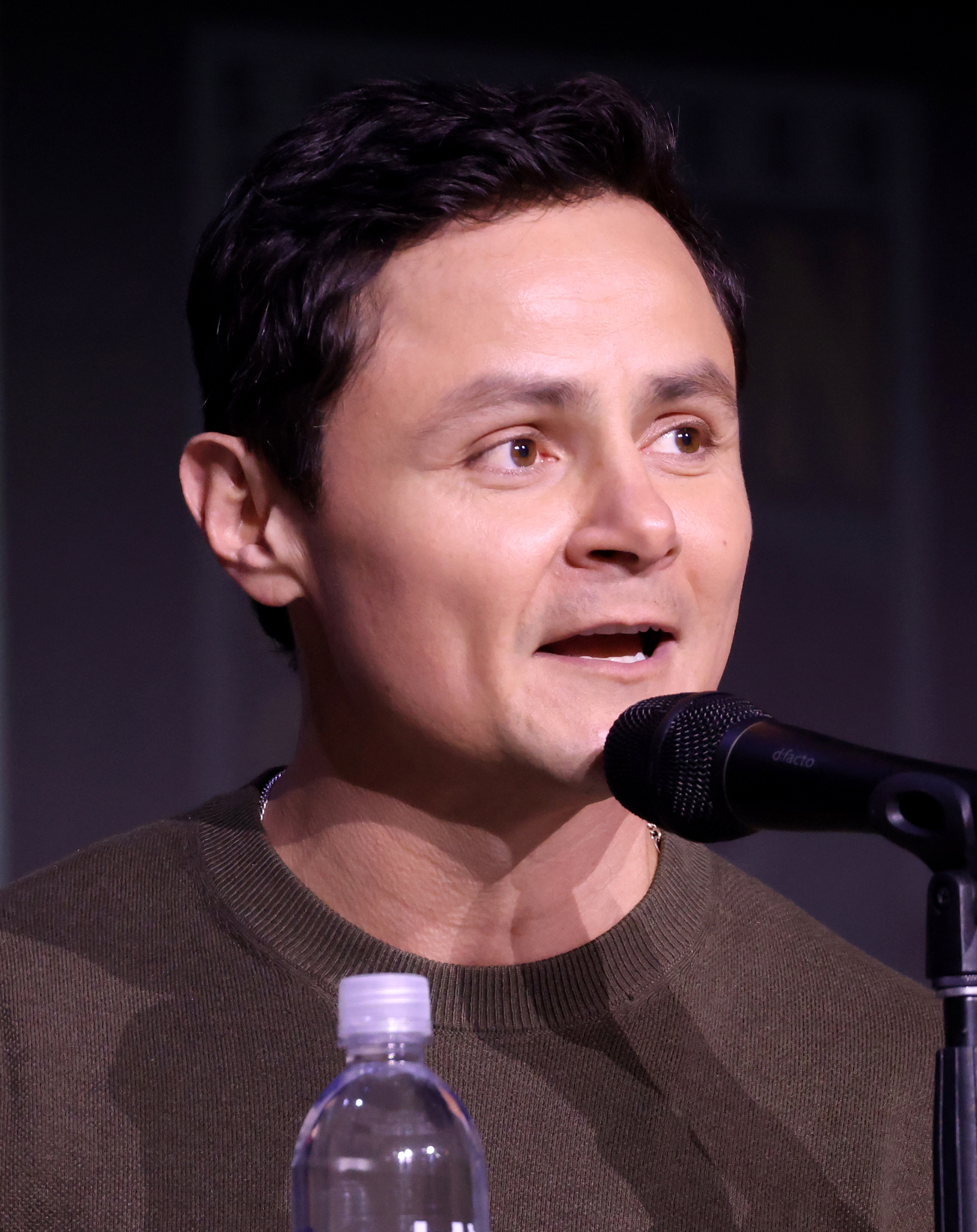
Arturo Castro
(Joe)

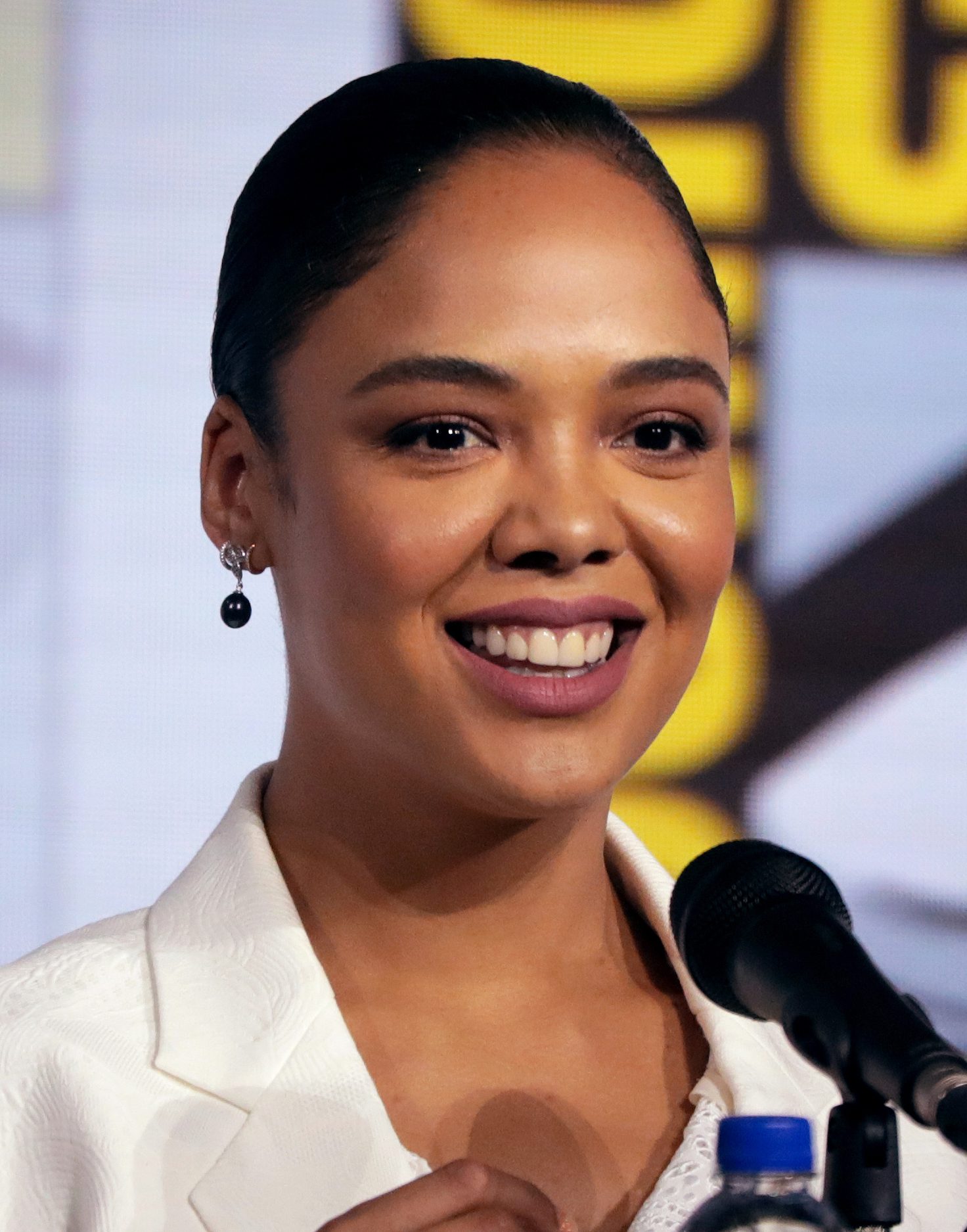
Tessa Thompson
(Lady)

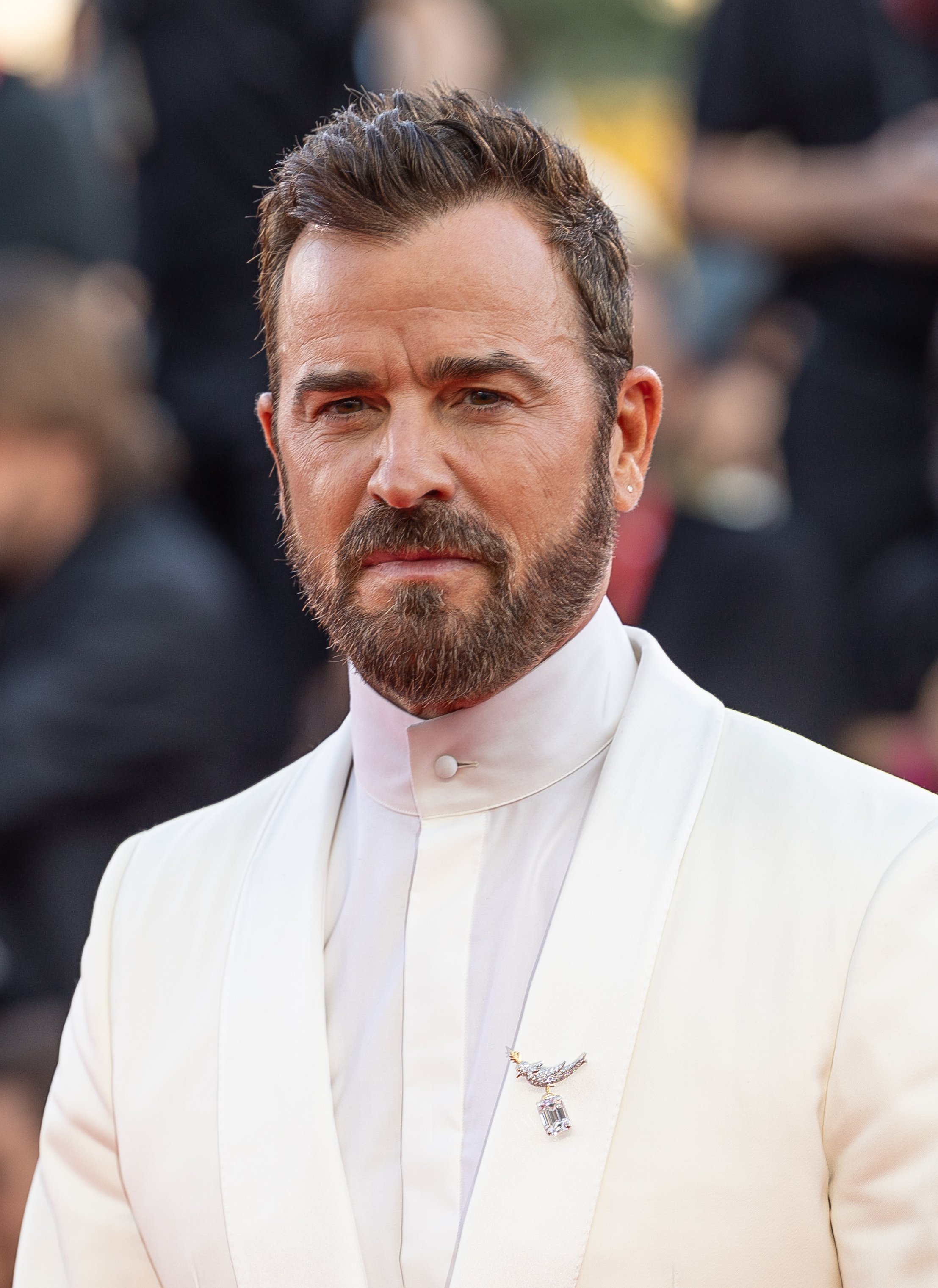
Justin Theroux
(Tramp)

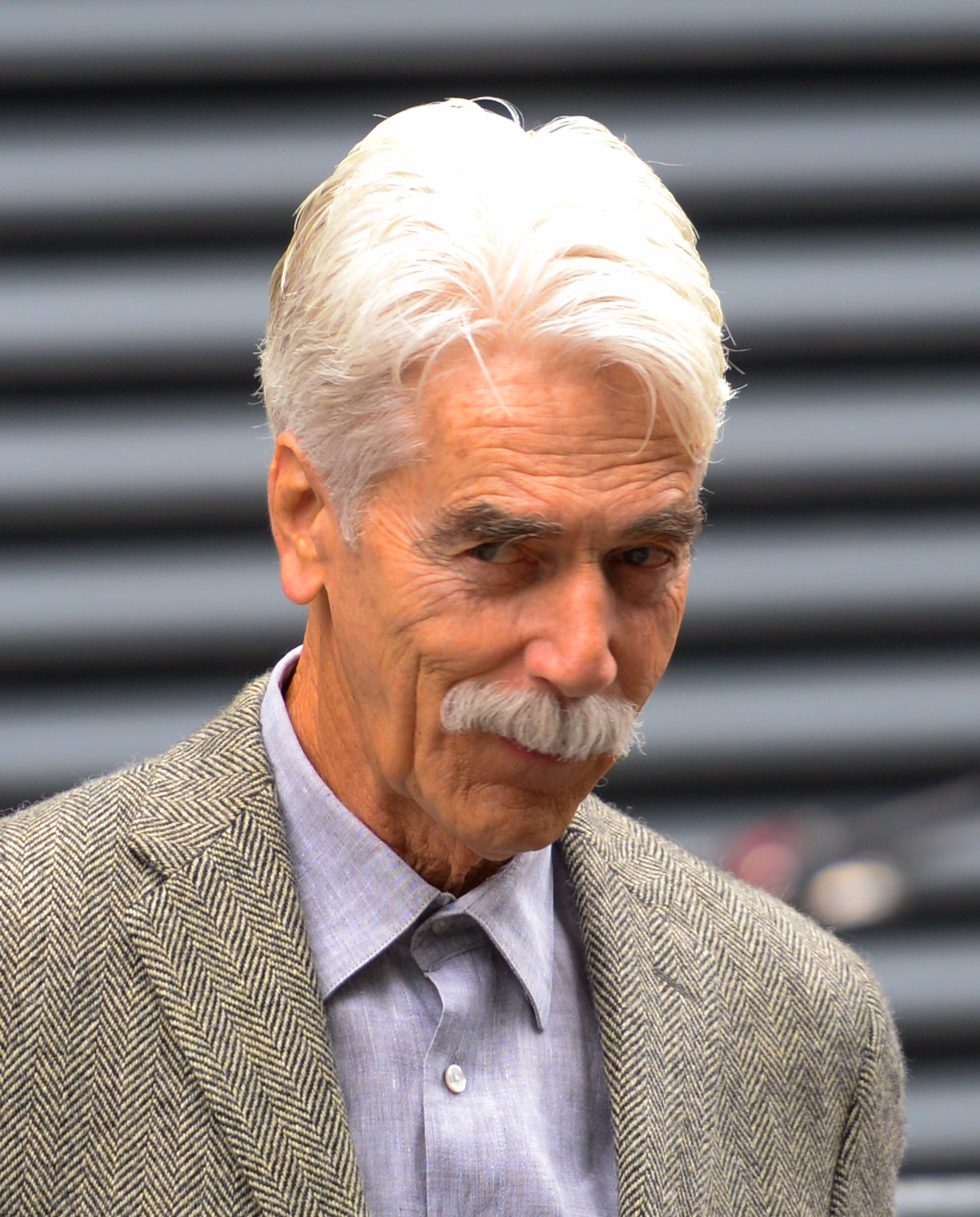
Sam Elliott
(Trusty)

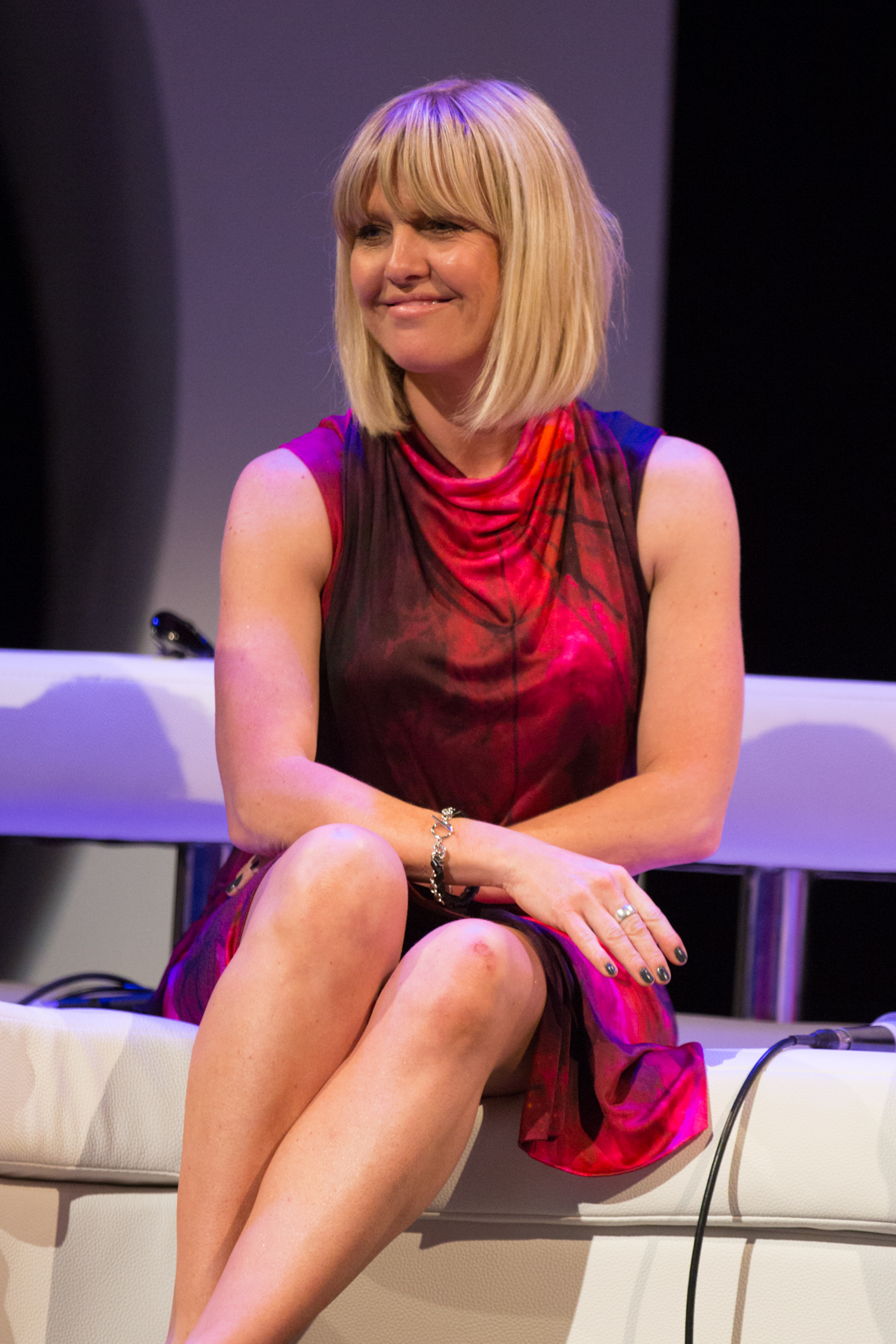
Ashley Jensen
(Jock)

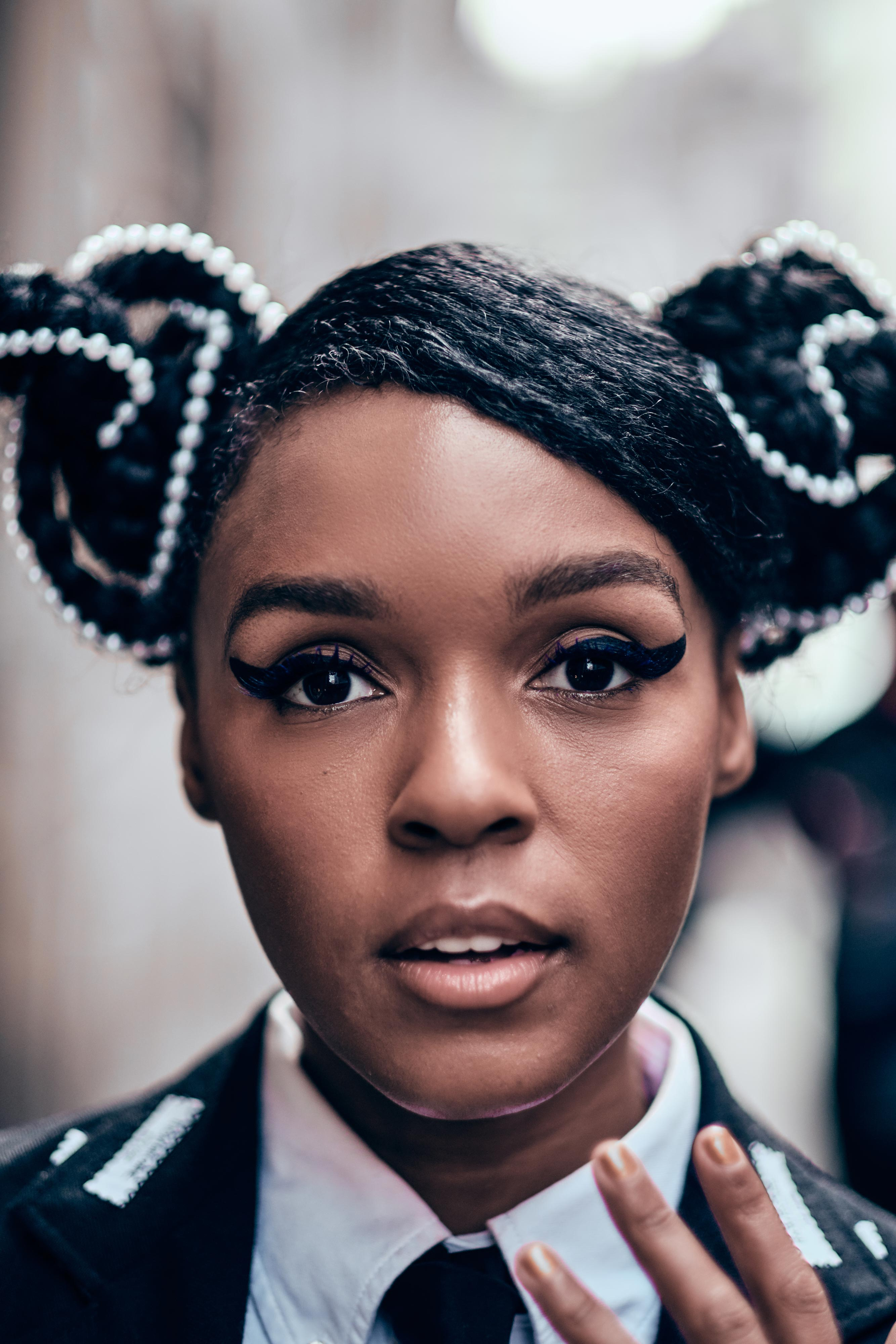
Janelle Monáe
(Peg)

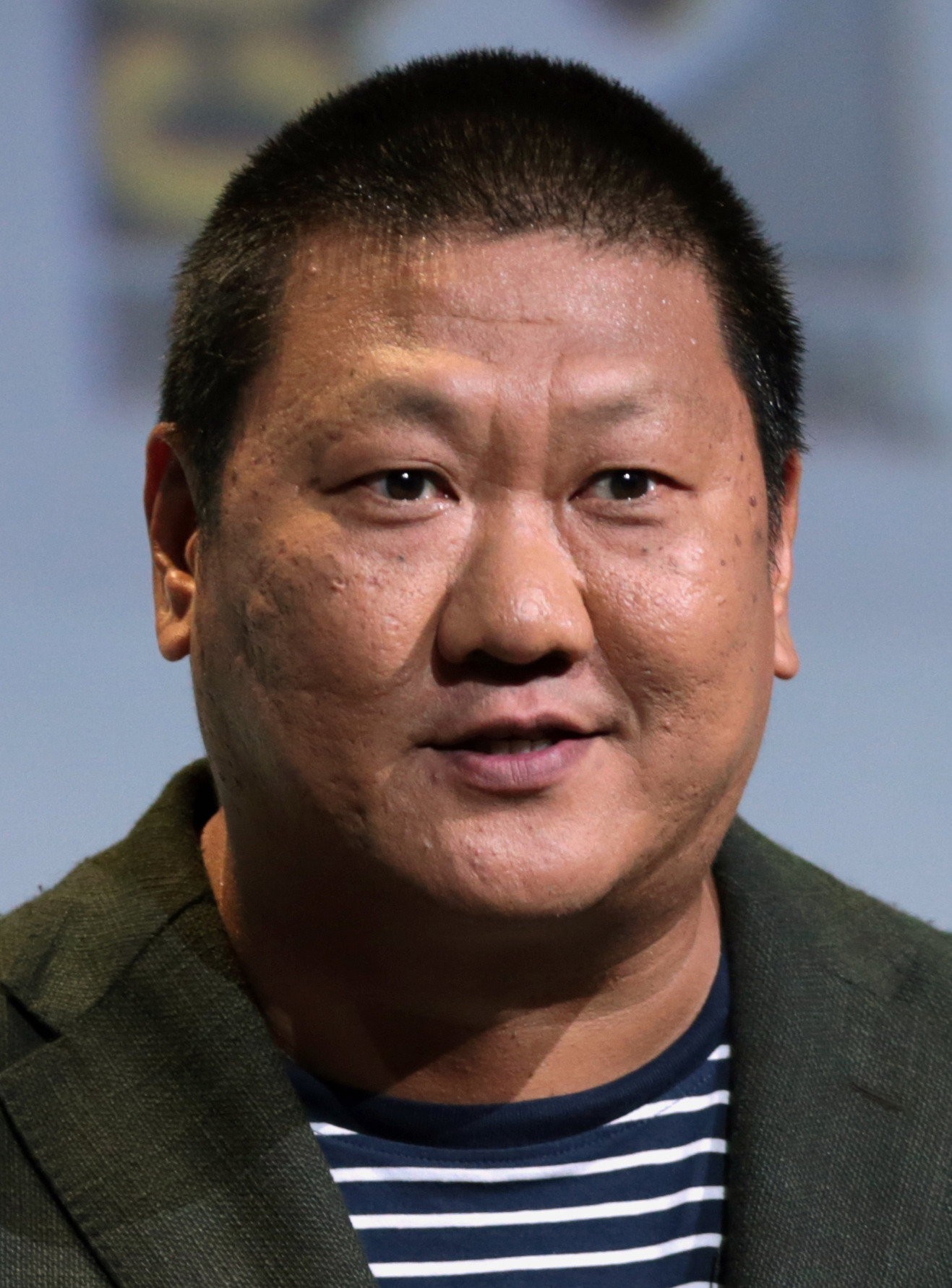
Benedict Wong
(Bull)

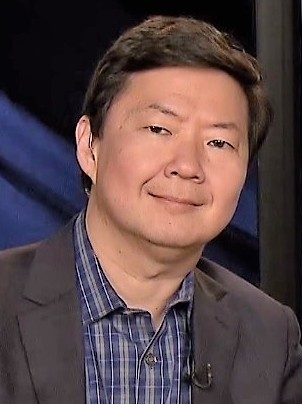
Ken Jeong
(Doctor)

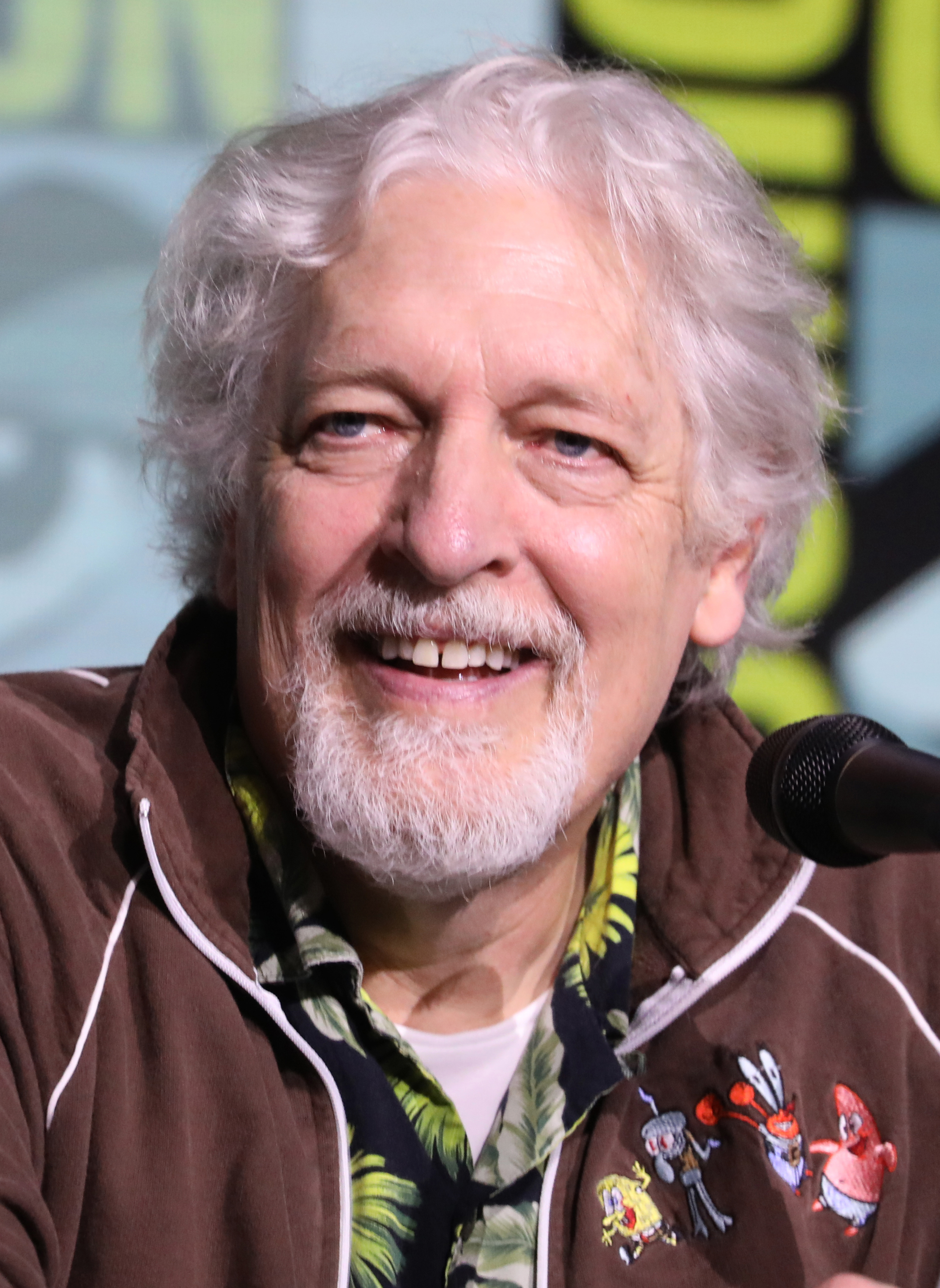
Clancy Brown
(Isaac)

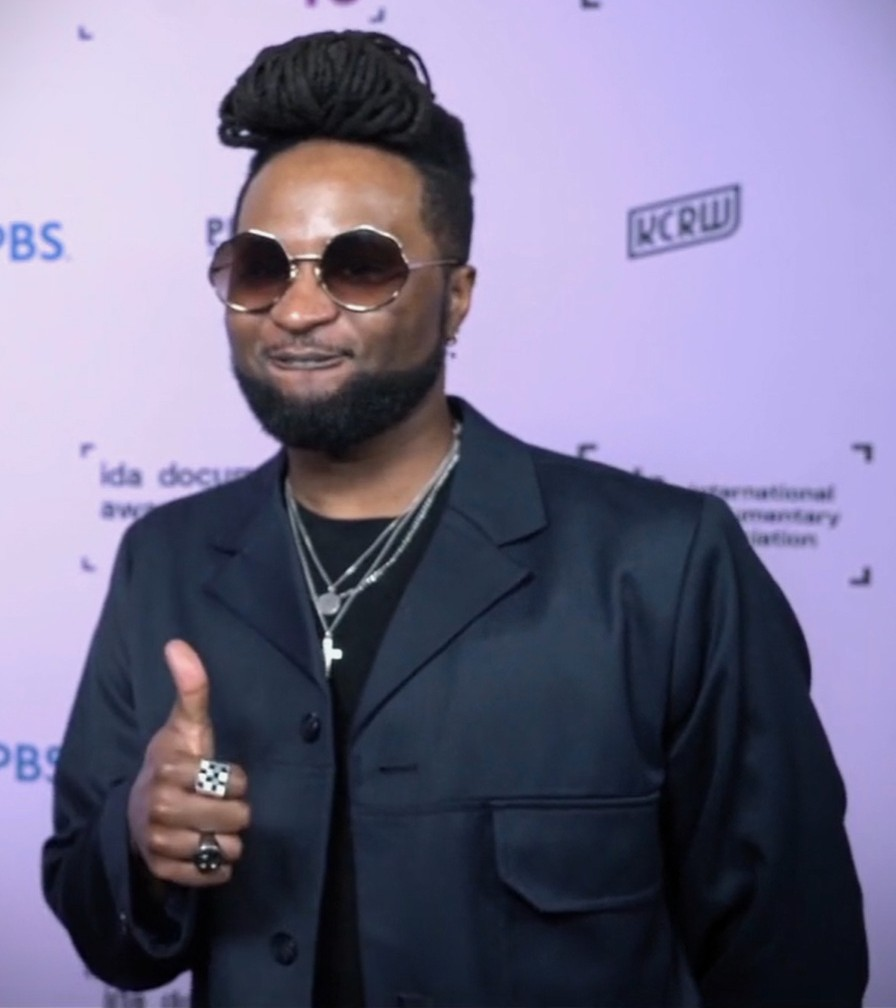
Roman GianArthur
(Rex)

In July 2018, it was announced that Ashley Jensen, Justin Theroux, and Sam Elliott had been cast in the voice roles of Jock, Tramp, and Trusty, respectively. Additionally, it was reported that Kiersey Clemons was in talks for the live-action role of Darling, Lady's human owner. In August 2018, it was reported that Tessa Thompson and Benedict Wong had been cast in the voice roles of Lady and Bull, respectively, and that Thomas Mann had been cast in the live-action role of Jim Dear. In September 2018, it was announced that Yvette Nicole Brown and Adrian Martinez had been cast in the live-action roles of Aunt Sarah and the dog-catcher Elliot, respectively. In October 2018, it was announced Arturo Castro had been cast in the live-action role of Marco and that Janelle Monáe had been cast in the voice role of Peg.

The production utilized real dogs to portray the film's titular characters with a dog named Rose portraying Lady in the film. About three months prior to the start of filming, the animals started their training for the film. Tramp is physically portrayed by Monte, a rescue dog, while Jackie was renamed Jock shortly before filming began.

=== Filming ===
Voice work for the film began in July 2018 with principal photography of the film's live-action externally filmed portions lasting from September 10, 2018 to November 18, 2018 in Savannah, Georgia. Locations were set to include Johnson Square, Wright Square and The Cathedral of St. John the Baptist. Filming on an indoor soundstage took place through December 2018.

=== Music ===
The film was going to feature a new version of "The Siamese Cat Song", performed by Janelle Monáe. The song was to be re-written by Nate "Rocket" Wonder, Roman GianArthur, and Monáe due to both its modern-day perceived racist connotations and to fit the characters' depictions in the film. The song was ultimately reworked as a blues song titled "What a Shame". Monáe also performed two new songs for the film. On August 23, 2019, Joseph Trapanese was revealed to be composing the film's score. The soundtrack, featuring Trapanse's score, as well as songs from the original film performed by the remake's cast, was released on November 12, 2019.

== Marketing ==
On August 23, 2019, a first trailer was released. On October 14, 2019, a second trailer featuring new footage as well as the song "He's a Tramp" was released. On November 6, 2019, a featurette which presented each of the dogs chosen to portray the main characters and how they were all rescued from animal shelters and foster homes was released.

=== Novelization ===
Unlike Ward Greene, a tie-in novelization of the film written by Elizabeth Rudnick was published by Disney Publishing Worldwide on January 28, 2020.

== Release ==
Lady and the Tramp was released on November 12, 2019 exclusively as part of the launch content library for Disney's streaming service, Disney+.

== Reception ==
=== Critical response ===
On the review aggregation website Rotten Tomatoes, the film holds an approval rating of 66% based on 71 reviews and an average rating of 5.8/10. The site's critics consensus reads: "Lady and the Tramp's cute dogs and likable cast work well enough, but the live-action update lacks some of the magic that made the original 1955 film such a delight." On Metacritic, the film has a weighted average score of 48 out of 100 based on reviews from 13 critics, indicating "mixed or average" reviews.

In a mixed review, Michael Phillips of the Chicago Tribune wrote, "The worst of this new Lady and the Tramp comes when the script piles on the strenuous comic action, followed by ill-advised dark shadows."

=== Accolades ===
Award	Date of ceremony	Category	Recipient(s)	Result	Ref.
Imagen Foundation Awards	2020	Best Actor - Feature Film	Adrian Martinez	Nominated	
Motion Picture Sound Editors	2020	Outstanding Achievement in Sound Editing - Sound Effects, Foley, Music, Dialogue and ADR for Non-Theatrical Feature Film Broadcast Media	Andrew DeCristofaro, Darren 'Sunny' Warkentin, David Esparza, Kelly Oxford, Michael Payne, Matthew Wilson, David Stanke, Geordy Sincavage, Alexander Jongbloed, Tara Blume, Monique Reymond, Vincent Guisetti, Bryan Lawson, Erica Weis	Nominated	
MovieGuide Awards	2020	Genesis Award		Nominated	
Visual Effects Society Awards	January 29, 2020	Outstanding Visual Effects in a Photoreal Episode	Robert Weaver, Christopher Raimo, Arslan Elver, Michael Cozens, Bruno Van Zeebroeck	Nominated	
Visual Effects Society Awards	January 29, 2020	Outstanding Animated Character in an Episode or Real-Time Project	Thiago Martins, Arslan Elver, Stanislas Paillereau, Martine Chartrand (For "Tramp")	Nominated	
