= Thomas Mann (actor) =

American actor (born 1991)

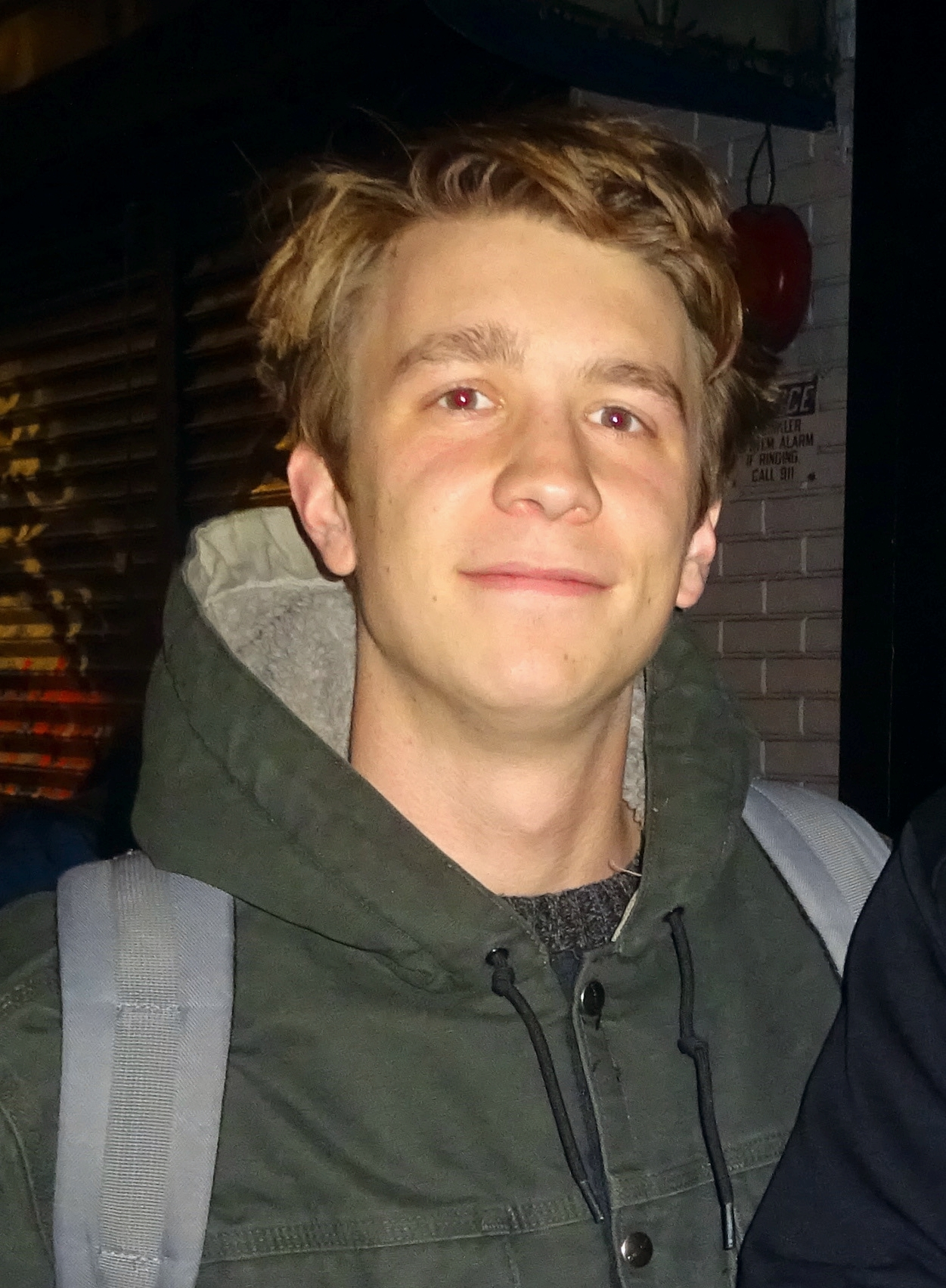
- Mann in 2016
- Born: September 27, 1991 (age 35); Portland, Oregon, U.S.
- Occupation: Actor
- Years active: 2009–present

Thomas Mann (born September 27, 1991) is an American actor. After making his film debut with a supporting role in It's Kind of a Funny Story (2010), Mann had his breakout with a lead role in the found footage teen comedy film Project X (2012).

Following Project X, Mann had starring roles in the films Fun Size (2012), Beautiful Creatures (2013), and Welcome to Me (2014), and had the lead role in the comedy-drama film Me and Earl and the Dying Girl (2015). In the late 2010s, Mann starred in the films Kong: Skull Island (2017), Amityville: The Awakening (2017), The Highwaymen (2019), and Lady and the Tramp (2019).

In the 2020s, Mann starred in the films Marcel the Shell with Shoes On (2021), Halloween Kills (2021), About Fate (2022), and Parachute (2023), and had a main role as Johnny Buss on season 2 of the HBO television series Winning Time: The Rise of the Lakers Dynasty (2023). He also had a recurring role as Boryweitz on the Apple TV+ miniseries Lessons in Chemistry (2023).

== Early life ==
Mann was born in Portland, Oregon, and grew up in Dallas, Texas. His father is a construction project manager, and his mother is a nurse. Mann attended Plano East Senior High School briefly before moving to California at the age of 17 to pursue acting.

== Career ==
=== Early work ===
In 2009, Mann made his acting debut on the Nickelodeon sitcom television series iCarly portraying the role of Jeffrey. Later in the year, Mann appeared in The Middle portraying the role of Brendan Nichols.

In 2010, Mann was cast as the protagonist in the comedy film Project X. Mann was told he could not audition because producers only wished to cast people without acting credits; Mann was ultimately given the role after auditioning 7 times. The film centers on Mann's character, Thomas Kub, who throws a house party for his birthday that becomes totally out of hand. Filming began in June that same year in Los Angeles, California on a $12 million budget. A planned sequel was in development in 2012.

In March 2012, Mann was in final negotiations to star in a film adaptation of the novel King Dork. It was optioned in November 2006 by Gary Sanchez Productions, a joint production company founded by Will Ferrell and Adam McKay. The same year, Mann appeared in the film Fun Size alongside Victoria Justice portraying the role of Roosevelt. The film was released in the United States on October 26, and was both a box office bomb and a critical flop.

Throughout 2013, Mann appeared in Hansel & Gretel: Witch Hunters portraying the role of Ben. The film was released in the U.S. on January 25. That same year, Mann appeared in Beautiful Creatures, a film adaption of the book with the same name. Mann appeared alongside Viola Davis and Emma Thompson, portraying the role of Link. The film was released on February 14, and grossed $60 million worldwide against a budget of $60 million. Mann later appeared in As Cool As I Am alongside Sarah Bolger and James Marsden. The film was released on June 21, by IFC Films.

=== Breakthrough: 2015–present ===
Mann starred in many films in 2015. He began starring in the film adaptation of Jesse Andrews' novel, Me and Earl and the Dying Girl, which premiered on January 25 at the 2015 Sundance Film Festival. The film was acquired by Fox Searchlight for $12 million, which was the most money paid for a film at the festival, and was released on June 12 in the U.S. That same year, Mann appeared in The Stanford Prison Experiment, which also premiered at the same Sundance Film Festival; Mann portrayed the role of Prisoner 416. The film began a limited release on July 17 by IFC Films. Mann also appeared in Barely Lethal, also starring Sophie Turner and Hailee Steinfeld, was released on May 29 in a limited release and through VOD by DirecTV Cinema and A24. Then he starred as Tobias Hammell in the drama The Preppie Connection. The film is about Mann's character, a student at a private school, using connections to start a drug trafficking network at the school.

In 2016, he starred as Matt in Some Freaks, a teen romance, Blood Father, opposite William H. Macy and Mel Gibson, and the drama Brain on Fire, alongside Chloë Grace Moretz and Jenny Slate.

In 2017, Mann played Reg Slivko in the fantasy action film Kong: Skull Island, and appeared alongside Bella Thorne in Amityville: The Awakening. After a 3-year delay, the film was released for free on Google Play. Then he appeared in the acclaimed Fargo episode "The Law of Non-Contradiction."

In 2019, Mann played Ted Hinton in John Lee Hancock's drama film The Highwaymen, which was released on Netflix in March of the same year.

In 2021, Mann was announced as starring in a remake of the Soviet television film The Irony of Fate titled About Fate. Filming was scheduled to begin in Boston in June 2021 and the film was released in 2022.

In 2024, Mann was featured in a YouTube short film that was related to his 2012 role as Thomas Kub in Project X. He was featured alongside his original co-stars Dax Flame and Oliver Cooper.

== Filmography ==
Key
†	Denotes films that have not yet been released

=== Film ===
Year	Title	Role	Notes
2010	It's Kind of a Funny Story	Aaron Fitzcarraldo	
2012	Project X	Thomas Kub	
2012	Fun Size	Roosevelt Leroux	
2013	Hansel and Gretel: Witch Hunters	Ben	
2013	Beautiful Creatures	Wesley "Link" Lincoln	
2013	As Cool as I Am	Kenny Crauder	
2014	Welcome to Me	Rainer Ybarra	
2015	Me and Earl and the Dying Girl	Greg Gaines	
2015	The Stanford Prison Experiment	Prisoner 416	
2015	Barely Lethal	Roger Marcus	
2015	The Preppie Connection	Tobias Hammel	
2015	Memoria	Alex Dratch	
2016	Blood Father	Jason	
2016	Some Freaks	Matt	
2016	Brain on Fire	Stephen Grywalski	
2017	Kong: Skull Island	Reg Slivko	
2017	Amityville: The Awakening	Terrence	
2017	Lean on Pete	Lonnie	Deleted scene
2018	Maine	Lake	
2018	Our House	Ethan	
2018	The Land of Steady Habits	Preston Hill	
2019	Them That Follow	August "Augie" Slaughter	
2019	The Highwaymen	Ted Hinton	
2019	Lady and the Tramp	Jim Dear	
2021	Marcel the Shell with Shoes On	Mark	
2021	Halloween Kills	Young Frank Hawkins	
2022	The Chariot	Harrison Hardy	
2022	About Fate	Griffin Reed	
2023	Parachute	Ethan	
2023	Cora Bora	Travis	
2024	Project X Dose	Himself	Short film
2025	Sovereign	Adam Bouchart	
2026	Lucy Schulman †		

=== Television ===
Year	Title	Role	Episodes
2009	iCarly	Jeffery Flanken	Episode: "iGive Away a Car"
2009	The Middle	Brendan Nichols	Episode: "The Floating Anniversary"
2017	Fargo	Thaddeus Mobley	Episode: "The Law of Non-Contradiction"
2018	Drunk History	William Stuart-Houston	Episode: "World War II"
2020	Moonbase 8	Cooper	Episode: "Dry"
2022–2023	Winning Time: The Rise of the Lakers Dynasty	Johnny Buss	Main role (season 2)
2023	Lessons in Chemistry	Boryweitz	Miniseries; recurring role

== Awards and nominations ==
Year	Awards/Festival	Category	Nominated work	Result
2015	Hamptons International Film Festival	Breakthrough Performer	The Preppie Connection	Won
2015	Teen Choice Awards	Choice Movie Breakout Star	Me and Earl and the Dying Girl	Nominated
2015	Teen Choice Awards	Choice Movie Chemistry (shared with RJ Cyler)	Me and Earl and the Dying Girl	Nominated
2016	Empire Awards	Best Male Newcomer	Me and Earl and the Dying Girl	Nominated
2019	Newport Beach Film Festival	Ensemble Cast (shared with the cast)	Them That Follow	Won
