= Nature of the Beast (2007 film) =

2007 television film

Nature of the Beast is a 2007 American horror romantic comedy television film starring Autumn Reeser and Eddie Kaye Thomas. A werewolf movie, it premiered on ABC Family in 2007 and ran several times during its "13 Nights of Halloween" feature. It was directed by Rodman Flender. This television film was shot in Toronto, Ontario.

== Plot ==
Julia and Rich are engaged. Despite his protests, Julia succeeds in getting him to come to her family's mushroom moon harvest. Her overweight, pothead cousins search through his stuff, finding what they think are drugs and take them. As the full moon rises, Rich ruses back to his room to take the medicine, but finds it gone; he locks himself in a bathroom and transforms into a werewolf. Julia eventually discovers the truth, and after an argument (about her idiot cousins taking the medicine he needs to control the change), they reconcile their differences. Rich explains that when he was in college, a werewolf bit him on the rear when he and his buddies were climbing over a gate to escape. They plan to kill the Alpha werewolf, allowing him to be cured (Betas like himself can be cured by killing the Alpha if they have not taken a human life). Much to their shock, they find his best friend from College is the Alpha wolf, who forced him to transform to attack her. However, his love for her prevents him from harming her, allowing his human consciousness to take hold and allow him to kill the Alpha. At their wedding, he jokes about something sexual, prompting her to call him a beast.

== Cast ==
- Autumn Reeser as Julia
- Eddie Kaye Thomas as Rich
- Ely Henry as Garrett

== Critical reception ==
The film received poor reviews. The Chicago Tribune called it "a howler, but not in a good way." Cinema Crazed also panned the movie.
