= Air Force One Down =

2024 film by James Bamford

- Theatrical release poster
- Directed by: James Bamford
- Written by: Steven Paul
- Produced by: Steven Paul
- Starring: Katherine McNamara; Ian Bohen; Dascha Polanco; Rade Šerbedžija; Paul S. Tracey; Anthony Michael Hall
- Cinematography: Anton Bakarski
- Edited by: Trevor Mirosh; Robert A. Ferretti
- Music by: Rich Walters
- Production company: SP Media Group
- Distributed by: Republic Pictures
- Release date: February 9, 2024
- Running time: 84 minutes
- Country: United States
- Language: English

Air Force One Down is a 2024 American action film directed by James Bamford, written and produced by Steven Paul, and starring Katherine McNamara, Ian Bohen, Dascha Polanco, Rade Šerbedžija, Paul S. Tracey, and Anthony Michael Hall.

Air Force One Down was released on February 9, 2024.

== Synopsis ==
Allison Miles is a rookie secret service agent who finds herself aboard Air Force One in her first assignment. The plane is suddenly hijacked by a group of terrorists whose intention is to derail an energy deal. Agent Allison Miles must save President Edwards, whose life is on the line. Agent Miles is duty-bound to protect the president, facing an ultimate task and pushing her skills and bravery to the limits.

== Cast ==
- Katherine McNamara as United States Secret Service Special Agent Allison Miles
- Ian Bohen as President Dallas Edwards
- Rade Šerbedžija as Rodinov
- Hristo Mitzkov as Hozman
- Anthony Michael Hall as Sam Waitman
- Paul S Tracey as Miller
- Dascha Polanco as Vice President Hanson

== Production ==
Production for the film wrapped in March 2023.

== Release ==
Air Force One Down was distributed by Republic Pictures on February 9, 2024.

== Reception ==
On the review aggregator website Rotten Tomatoes, 11% of nine critics' reviews are positive, with an average rating of 3.8/10.
