= Taz: Quest for Burger =

- Directed by: Ryan Kramer
- Written by: Bryan Condon
- Story by: Jack Donaldson
- Produced by: Mark Marek
- Starring: Steve Blum; Hadley Gannaway; Eric Bauza; Ian James Corlett; Ely Henry; Piotr Michael; Kevin Michael Richardson; Jon Luke Thomas; James Urbaniak
- Edited by: Nick Simotas
- Music by: Jake Monaco; Toby Sherriff
- Production companies: Warner Bros. Animation; Titmouse, Inc.
- Distributed by: Warner Bros. Home Entertainment
- Release date: June 6, 2023
- Running time: 75 minutes
- Country: United States
- Language: English

Taz: Quest for Burger is a 2023 American animated direct-to-streaming comedy film starring the Looney Tunes character Taz, produced by Warner Bros. Animation and animated by Titmouse, Inc. It was released digitally on June 6, 2023.

== Summary ==
A young bandicoot, Quinn, recruits Taz the Tasmanian devil to help rescue her father after he is kidnapped by outlaws.

== Voice cast ==
- Steve Blum as Taz
- Hadley Gannaway as Quinn
- Eric Bauza as Sid/Bandicoot Friend
- Ian James Corlett as Dad/Bill
- Ely Henry as Aristotle
- Piotr Michael as Lou/Stan
- Kevin Michael Richardson as Butch/Emo
- Jon Luke Thomas as Ned/Sam
- James Urbaniak as Rocky
- Kari Wahlgren as Melanie/Koala

== Critical reception ==
Jennifer Green writing for Common Sense Media gave the film a score of three out of five, saying:

This animated cartoon stars a young bandicoot alongside the classic Tasmanian Devil in a cute tale of friendship and adventure. The star of Taz Quest for Burger, Quinn, is wonderfully voiced by Gannaway (Young Anna in Frozen 2) as a precociously smart, determined, and kind creature. She's still a kid, inspired by the adventures of a book character, but she's wise beyond her years. She corrects Taz (voiced by veteran Blum) when he calls her nosy -- "I'm intellectually curious." Quinn is a fun hero worth following on her adventures. The animation is pleasing in its simplicity and subdued color palette.
