= Smallfoot =

2018 film by Karey Kirkpatrick

- Theatrical release poster
- Directed by: Karey Kirkpatrick
- Screenplay by: Karey Kirkpatrick; Clare Sera
- Story by: John Requa; Glenn Ficarra; Karey Kirkpatrick
- Based on: Yeti Tracks by Sergio Pablos
- Produced by: Bonne Radford; Glenn Ficarra; John Requa
- Starring: Channing Tatum; James Corden; Zendaya; Common; LeBron James; Danny DeVito; Gina Rodriguez; Yara Shahidi; Ely Henry; Jimmy Tatro
- Cinematography: Stephen W. Childers
- Edited by: Peter Ettinger
- Music by: Heitor Pereira (score); Wayne Kirkpatrick (songs); Karey Kirkpatrick (songs)
- Production companies: Warner Animation Group; Zaftig Films
- Distributed by: Warner Bros. Pictures
- Release date: September 28, 2018 (United States)
- Running time: 96 minutes
- Country: United States
- Language: English
- Budget: $80 million
- Box office: $214 million

Smallfoot is a 2018 American animated musical comedy film produced by Warner Animation Group and Zaftig Films, and distributed by Warner Bros. Pictures. Based on the unpublished children's book Yeti Tracks by Sergio Pablos, the film was co-written and directed by Karey Kirkpatrick, and stars the voices of Channing Tatum, James Corden, Zendaya, Common, LeBron James, Gina Rodriguez, Danny DeVito, Yara Shahidi, Ely Henry, and Jimmy Tatro. The plot follows a tribe of Himalayan Yeti who come across a human being, with each species thinking the other was just a myth.

Smallfoot was theatrically released in the United States on September 28, 2018. It received generally positive reviews from critics and grossed $214 million at the box office.

== Plot ==
A village of Yetis live in isolation on a mountain above the clouds in the Himalayas. A young yeti named Migo abides by the law of the ancient stones held by Stonekeeper, the yetis' leader. The yetis believe ringing a gong with their heads wakes up the sun. While learning how to ring the gong, Migo gets distracted by his crush, Stonekeeper's daughter Meechee. He misses the gong, landing outside the village. There, Migo witnesses a plane crash and finds a "smallfoot" (human), whom the yetis believe is mythical before, but the plane and human are quickly blown off the mountain by the wind.

Migo runs back to inform the villagers, but Stonekeeper claims he is lying and banishes him from the village. Migo is visited by rejected yetis Gwangi, Kolka, and Fleem, who do not believe in the stones. They bring him to the Smallfoot Evidentiary Society (S.E.S.) led by Meechee. She convinces Migo to travel below the clouds. After some hesitation, Migo agrees, but his rope snaps and Migo falls, discovering land. Meanwhile, British human and wildlife documentary filmmaker Percy Patterson meets the pilot who saw Migo, and in an attempt to regain his fame after losing most of viewership, tries unsuccessfully to convince his assistant, Brenda, to dress up as a yeti for filming. Migo arrives and tries to communicate with Percy, but inadvertently terrifies him. After an attempt to tranquilize Migo, the errant dart hits Percy instead. Migo decides to abduct the unconscious Percy, stuffing him into a sleeping bag.

During the trek back up the mountain, Migo and Percy encounter a severe blizzard and are blown into a nearby cave. Migo discovers that Percy has frozen completely solid. He lights a fire and ties Percy up over it to thaw him out. As Percy regains consciousness, he believes Migo is trying to cook him alive. Percy breaks free from the rope and films and uploads a video of Migo before attempting to escape. Migo saves Percy from a bear in the cave, but his toe becomes ensnared in a bear trap. Percy takes pity on Migo, removing the trap and bandaging his wound. Realizing that Migo is trying to communicate with him, Percy agrees to go with him, and they head back up the mountain overnight, where they reunite with the S.E.S.

The yetis are confused by Percy's appearance but welcome him, much to Stonekeeper's dismay. Stonekeeper then reveals to Migo that long ago, the yetis used to live below the clouds but were forced into hiding by the vicious humans who mercilessly attacked them. To keep themselves safe, the yetis created the stones and fled to the mountain, where humans cannot survive. Meanwhile, Meechee is able to develop rudimentary communication with Percy by referring to crude chalk drawings Percy scribbles on her cave wall, but Percy begins showing signs of altitude sickness. Desperate to protect the village and Meechee, Migo reluctantly agrees to continue Stonekeeper's lie, telling the yetis that Percy is just a hairless wild yak. Stonekeeper locks Percy in an ice box, so he cannot alert other humans of the yetis' whereabouts. Migo later discovers that Meechee took Percy to return him home so he could recover and jumps down the mountain, with Gwangi and Kolka in tow.

Percy discovers that his video of Migo has generated significant public excitement; Meechee becomes distracted by the wonders of Kathmandu and accidentally causes a public disruption. She is attacked by the police, but Gwangi, Kolka, and Migo rescue her. As Migo tries to explain to Meechee that humans are monsters, they see a mural depicting a yeti attacking people and realize that humans view them as monsters. The yetis try to return to the mountain but are chased by a SWAT helicopter. The Stonekeeper comes down to help them and disables the helicopter while Migo tries to divert the police away from the other yetis. Percy arrives on his snowmobile and tranquilizes Migo to hide him and uses his fake Yeti costume to make the police think the Yetis were just a publicity stunt. Although Percy is punished with community service, Brenda is proud of him for choosing integrity and the Yeti’s wellbeing over fame.

Back at the village, Migo explains the truth to the yetis and apologizes for lying to them. He explains that even though humans may still be scared of the yetis, they should try to communicate with them. The yetis leave the village to go down the mountain. Percy and Brenda notice them and emerge from the crowd to stand up for the yetis. The rest of the humans slowly welcome the yetis and accept them into their lives.

== Voice cast ==
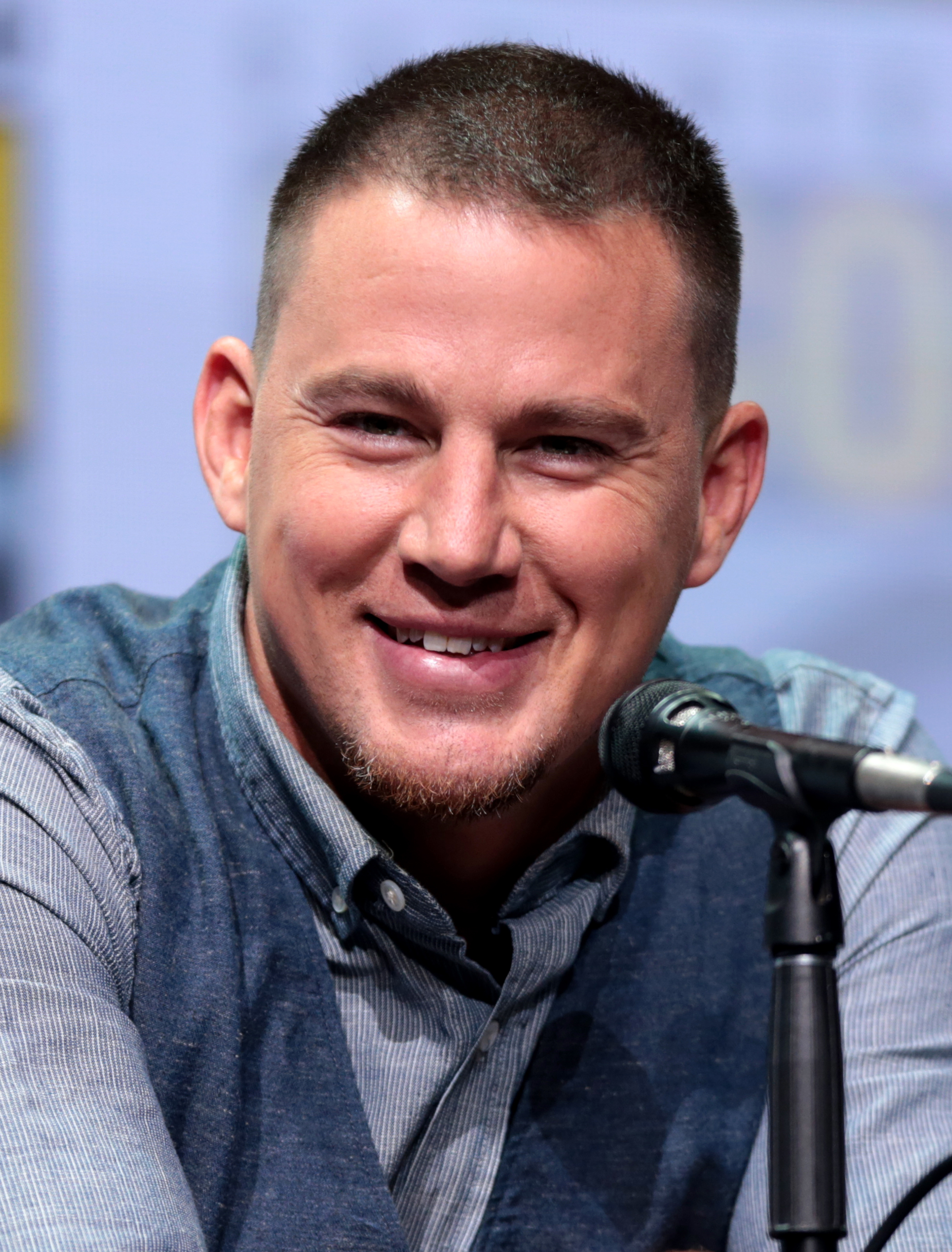
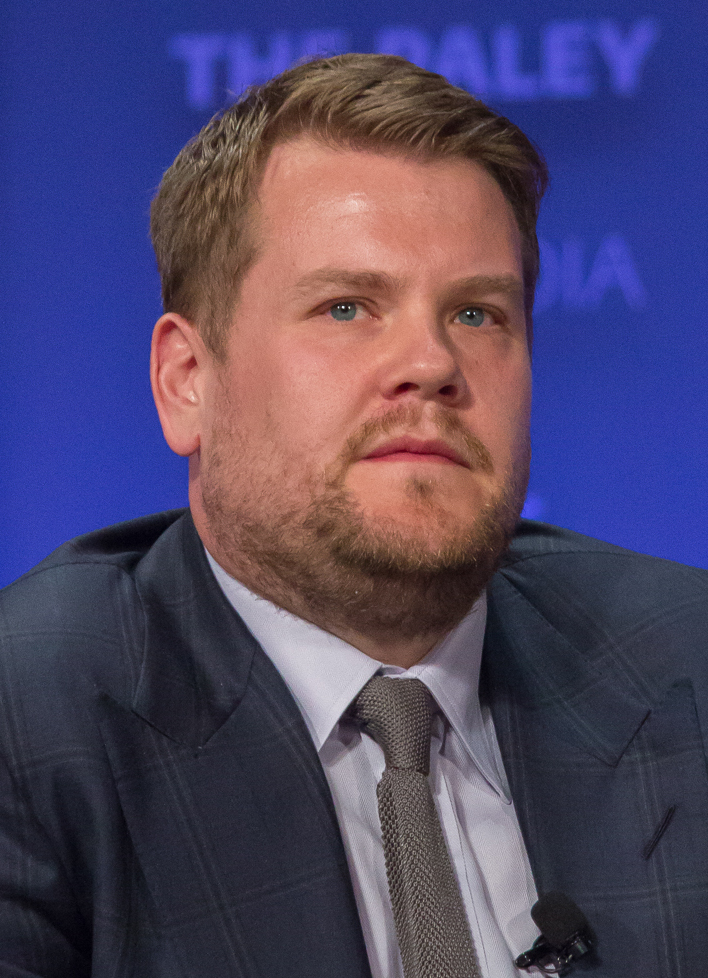
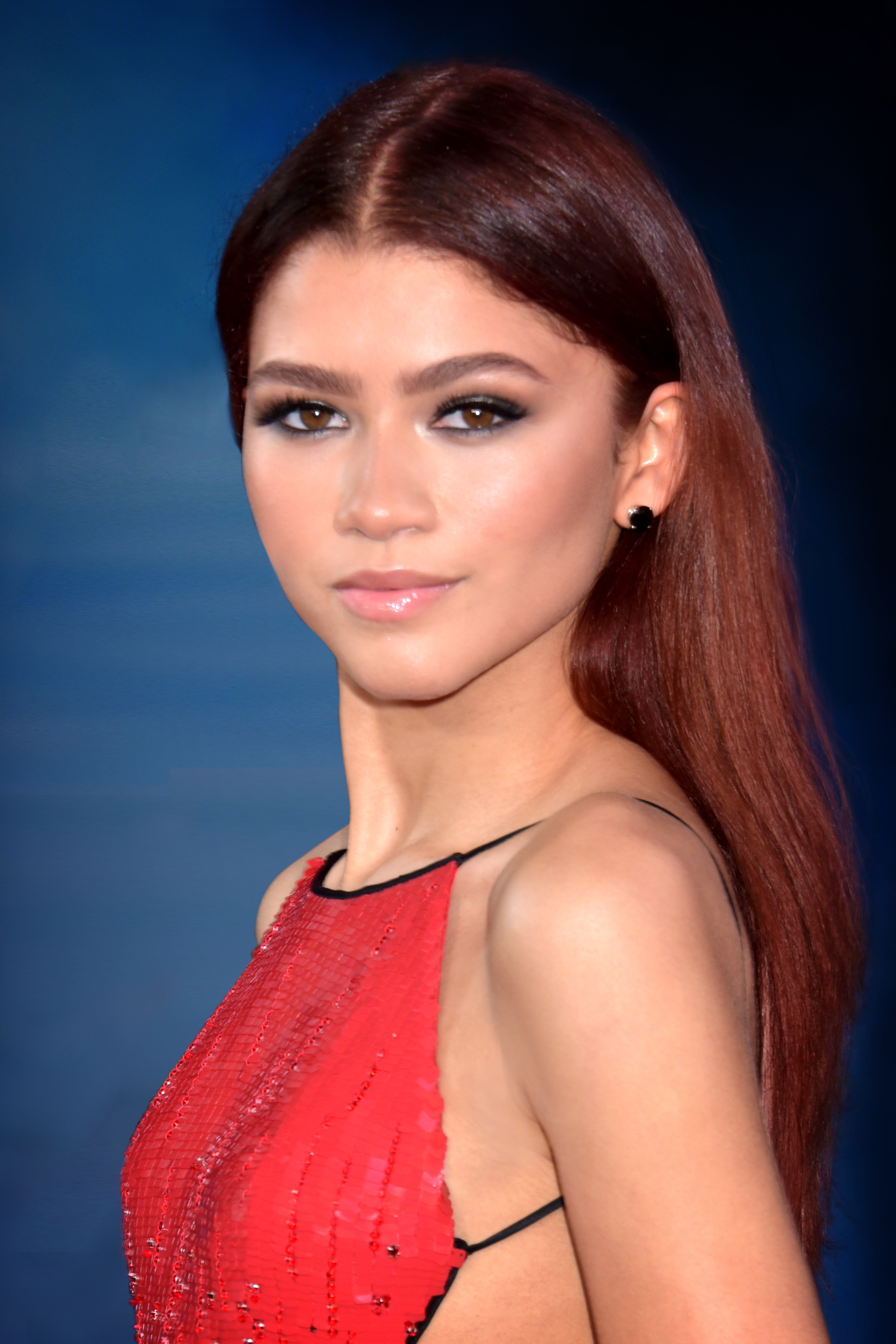
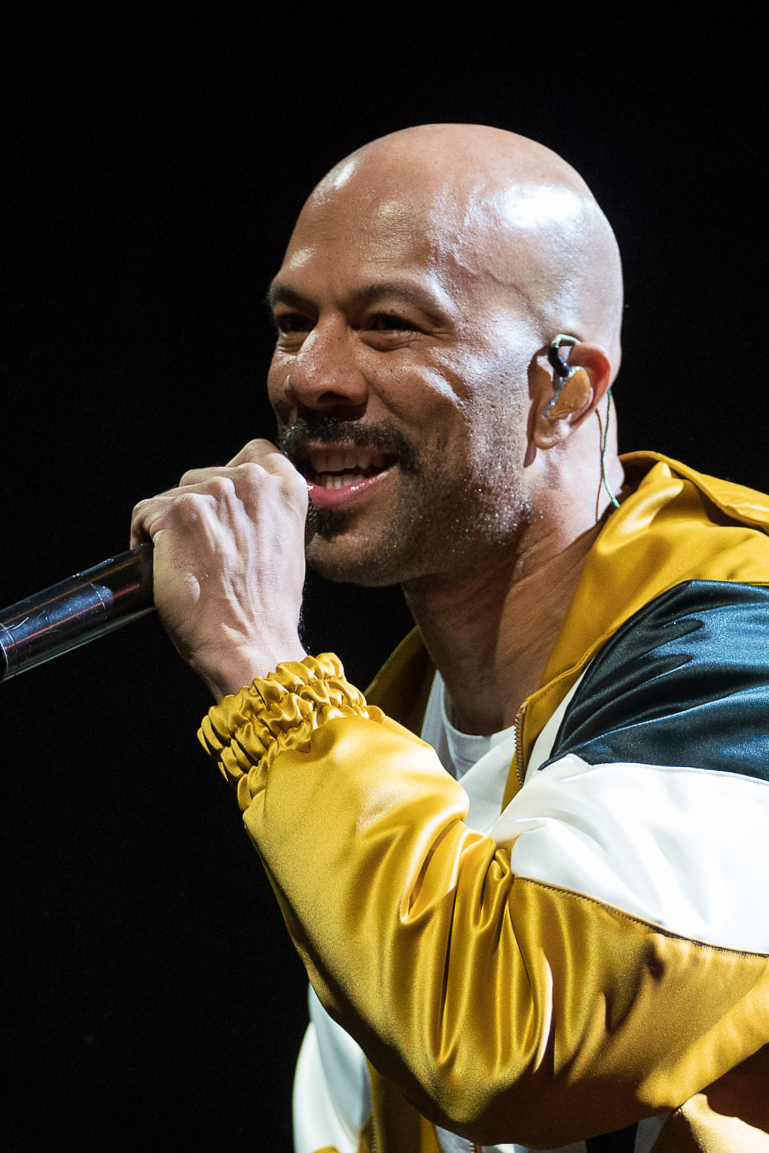
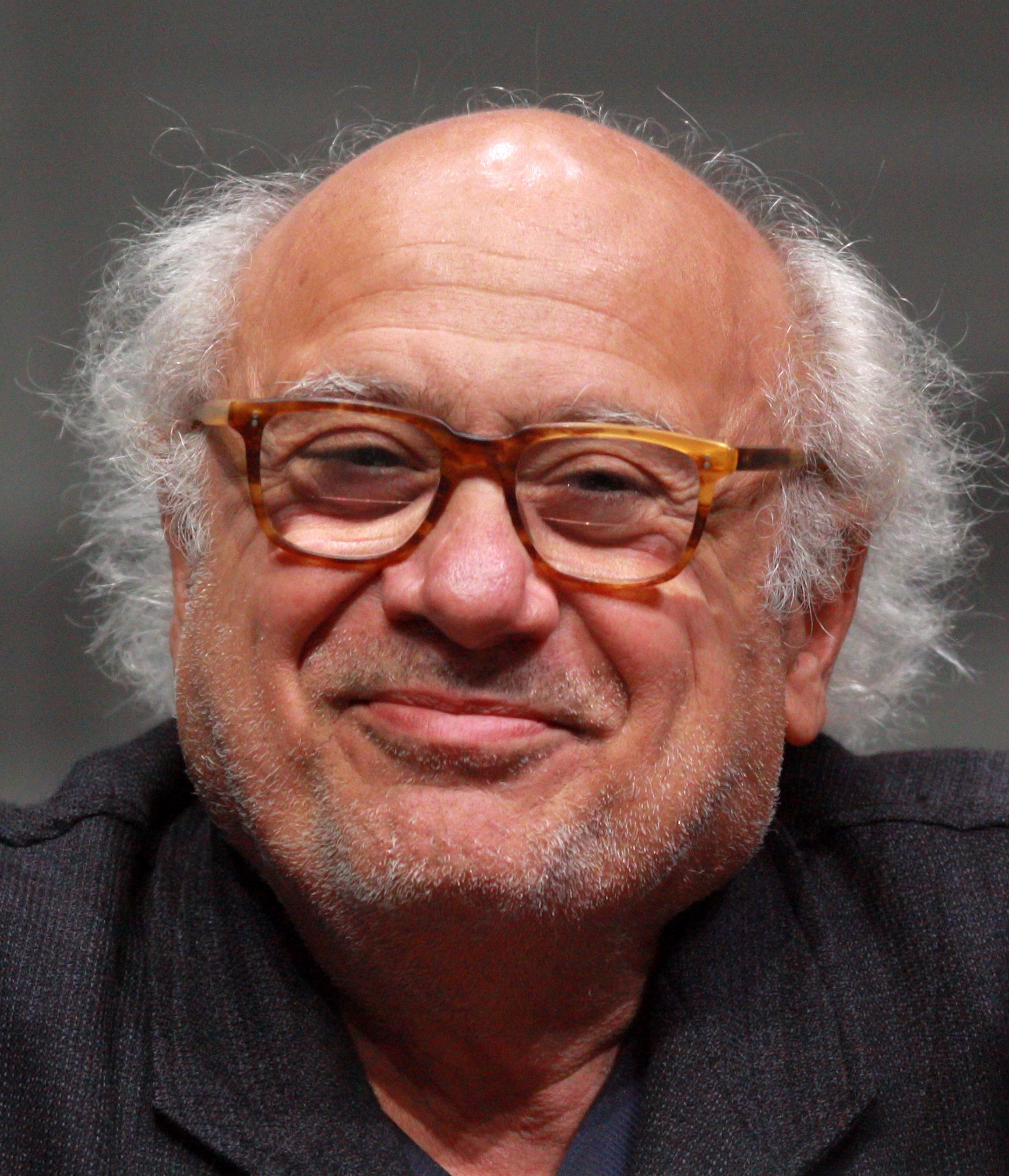
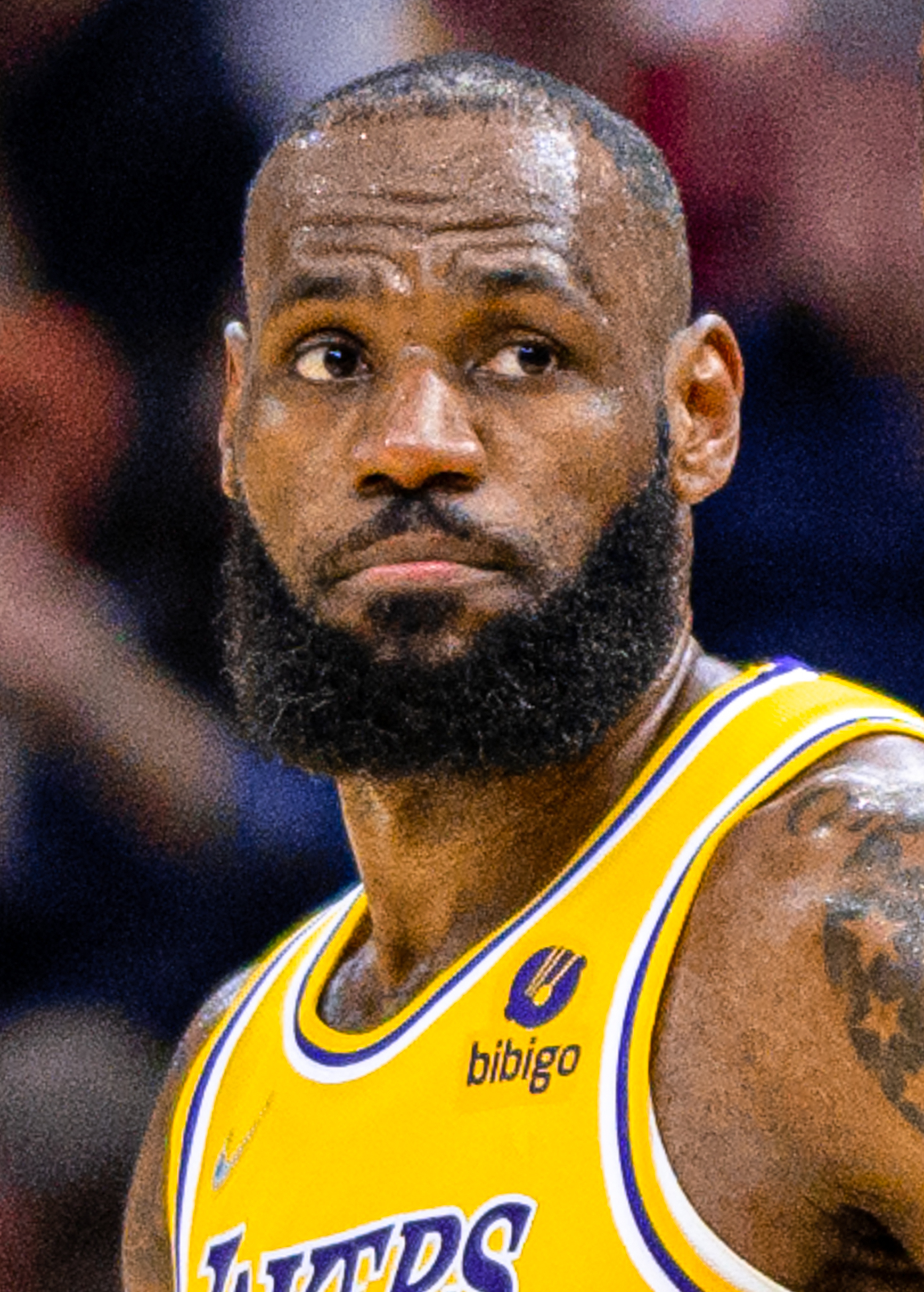
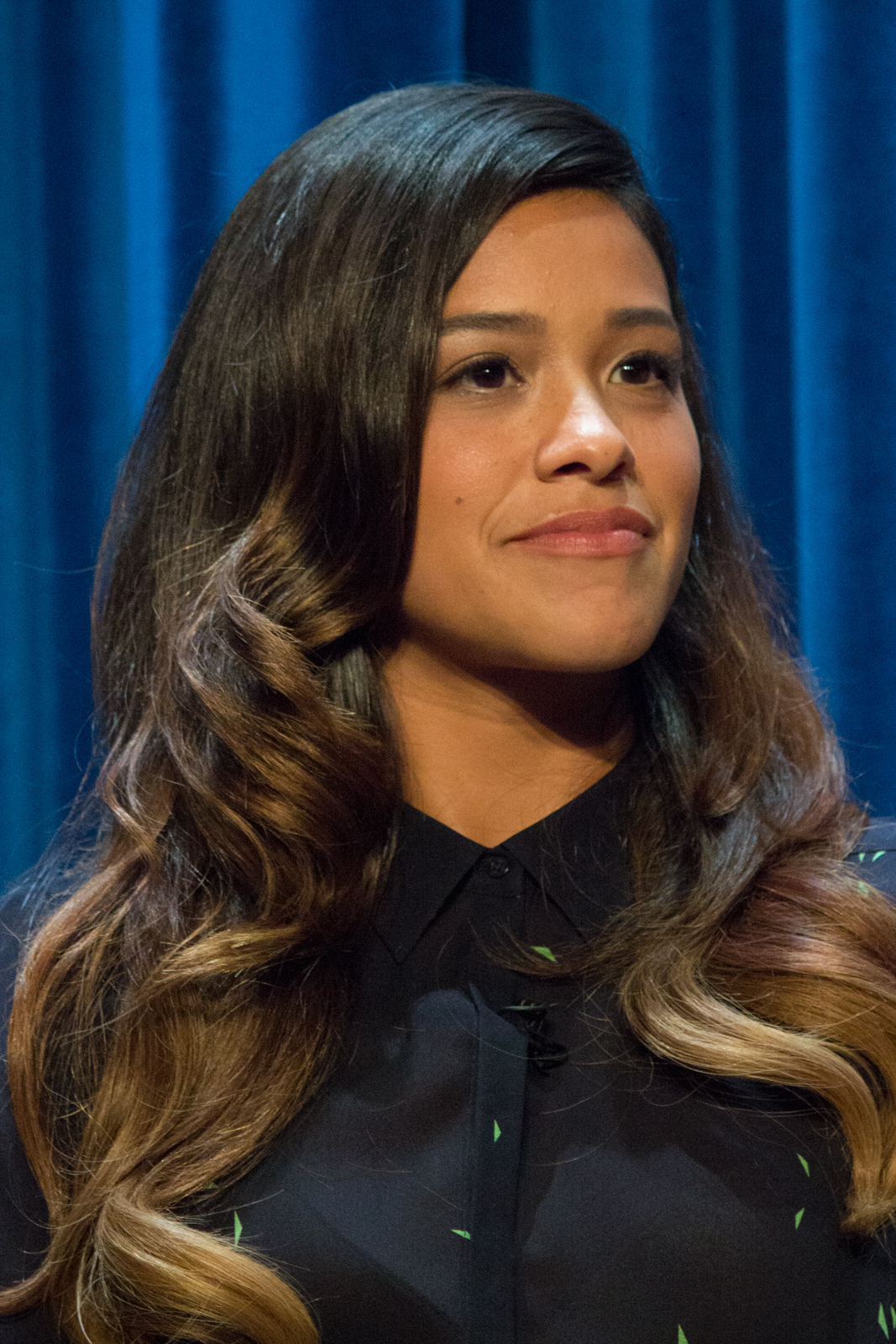
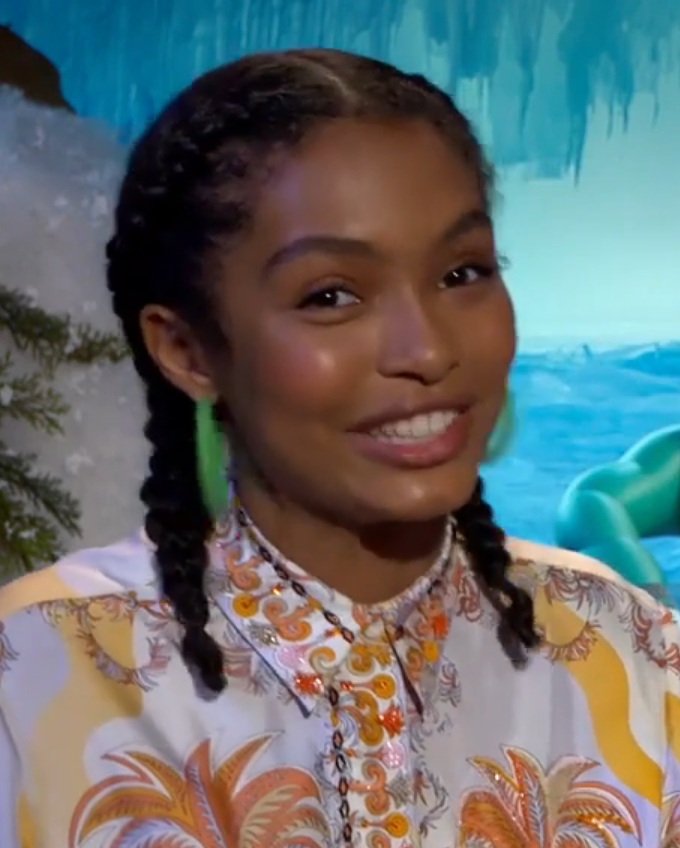
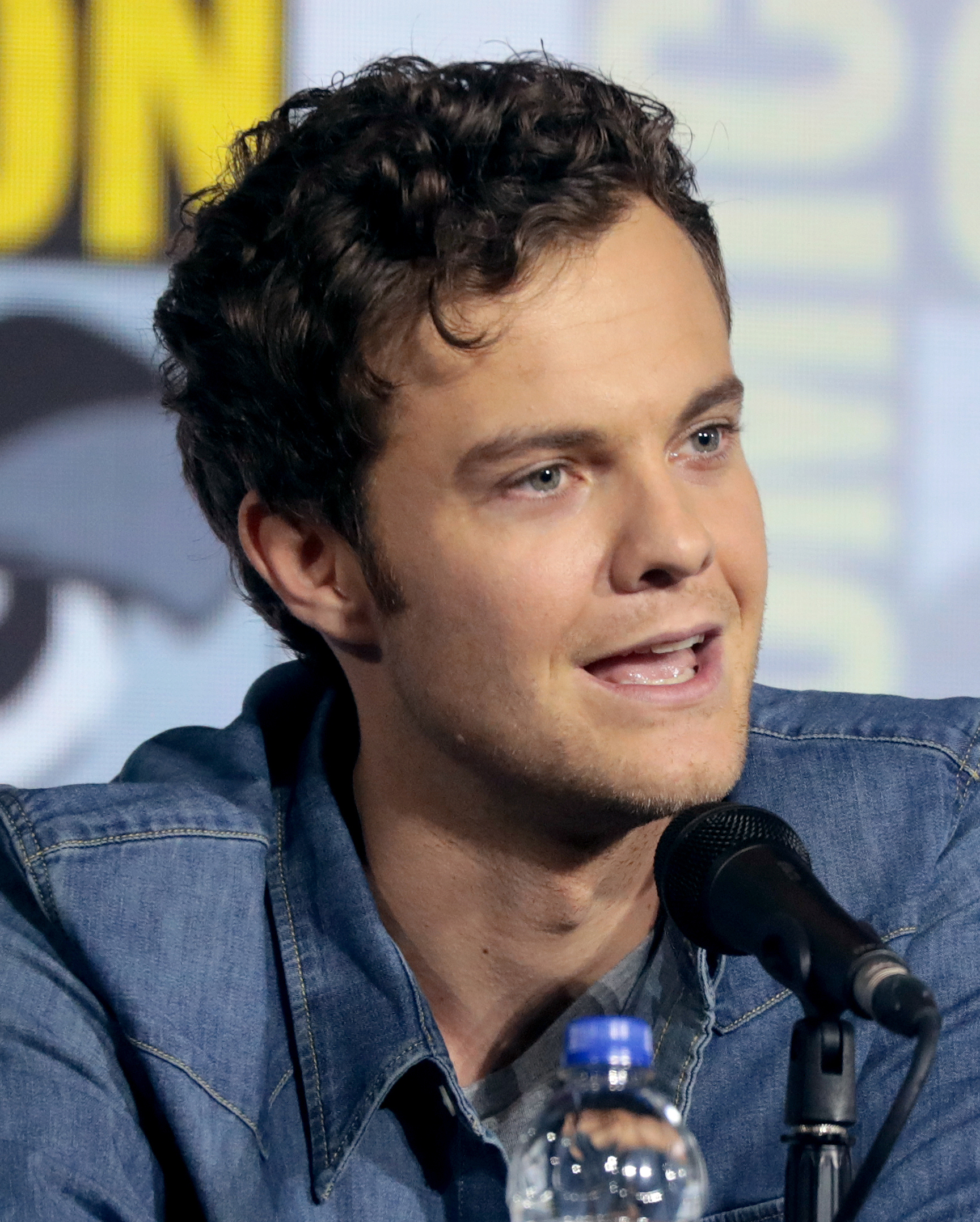
Top row: Channing Tatum, James Corden and Zendaya voice Migo, Percy Patterson & Meechee
Middle row: Common, Danny DeVito and LeBron James voice Stonekeeper, Dorgle and Gwangi
Bottom row: Gina Rodriguez, Yara Shahidi and Jack Quaid voice Kolka, Brenda and Pilot
- Channing Tatum as Migo, a young yeti who is determined to prove the existence of the Smallfoot.
- James Corden as Percy Patterson, a British human filmmaker of wildlife documentaries trying to get back in the spotlight, who becomes Migo's Smallfoot best friend.
- Zendaya as Meechee, a young yeti, the Stonekeeper's daughter, Thorp's younger sister, the leader of S.E.S., and Migo's love interest.
- Common as Stonekeeper, the condescending yeti chief and father of Thorp and Meechee.
- LeBron James as Gwangi, a large purple yeti who is part of the S.E.S.
- Gina Rodriguez as Kolka, a young yeti who is part of the S.E.S.
- Danny DeVito as Dorgle, a short yeti who is the village gong ringer and Migo's widowed father.
- Yara Shahidi as Brenda, Percy's morally conscious assistant, who does not believe in yetis until the end of the film.
- Ely Henry as Fleem, a small yeti who is part of the S.E.S. and is often an annoyance to the other members due to his sarcastic and pessimistic personality.
- Jimmy Tatro as Thorp, a slow-witted yeti who is the Stonekeeper's son and Meechee's older brother.
- Patricia Heaton as Mama Bear, a grumpy Himalayan brown bear Migo and Percy encounter in a cave while waiting out a blizzard. In the UK release, the part of Mama Bear was performed by Emma Bunton.
- Justin Roiland as Garry, a paranoid yeti.
- Jack Quaid as Pilot, a human airplane pilot who crashes on the mountain and who Migo first meets.
- Sarah Baker as Soozie's Mom

== Production ==
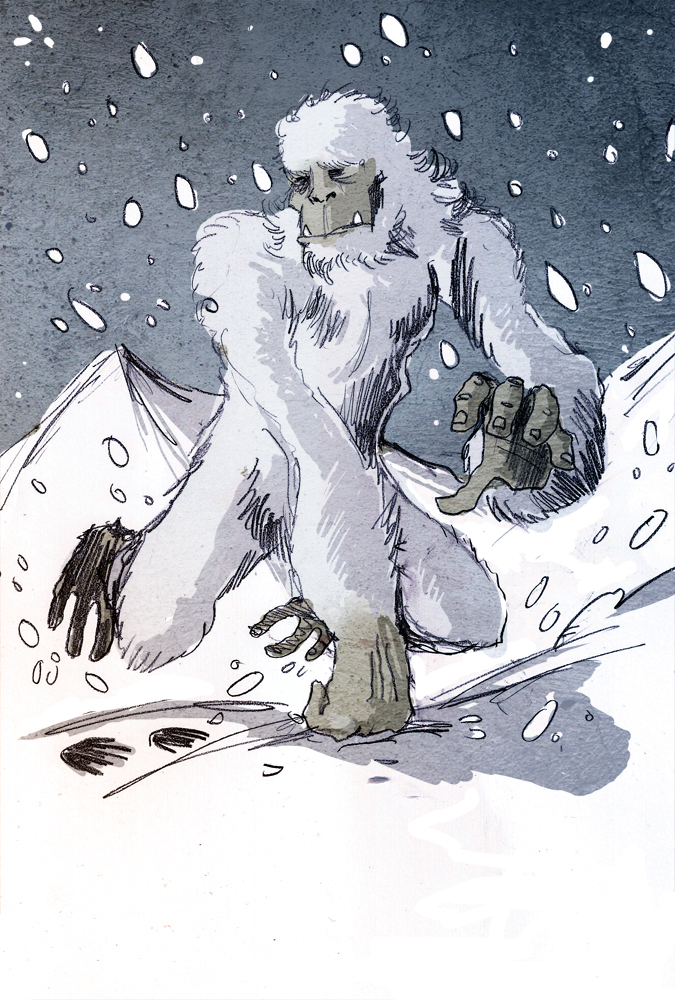
The legend of the Yeti and an original idea by Sergio Pablos inspired the story.

Writers Glenn Ficarra and John Requa conceived of Smallfoot, interested in a story about Yeti or Bigfoot; they drew inspiration from an original idea by Sergio Pablos.

The concept for Smallfoot was in development before director Karey Kirkpatrick joined the project in July 2016; he viewed an animatic in which Percy was a "ski bum type" with no motivation on his personality in the first drafts of the script and repetitive gag lines, and so they added more elements in his later revisions by giving arc and depth to his character. Kirkpatrick also said Meechee was undeveloped, and she was made head of the S.E.S. in rewrites. Observing Brexit and a rise in nationalism, Kirkpatrick also drew inspiration:

Truth was under attack ... certainly phrases like alternative facts were being thrown around. So, it became an age of misinformation fueled by agendas that are often fueled by fear. And like, 'I want this result, and so I am skewing the truth.' That is just in the zeitgeist.

On May 11, 2017, it was announced that the film was in-production with Channing Tatum, Zendaya, and Gina Rodriguez providing the lead voice roles. Ely Henry was originally hired as a scratch vocal for the film four years before its release, however was later invited to join the cast and subsequently voiced Fleem in the final product. The film was animated by Sony Pictures Imageworks, who had earlier been hired by Warner Animation Group to provide animation for Storks, and utilized Autodesk Maya for the animation process. Ryan O'Loughlin, a DreamWorks Animation veteran, was originally the film's director, but was replaced by Kirkpatrick.

== Music ==
The score for the film was composed by Heitor Pereira. The songs were written by Karey Kirkpatrick and his brother Wayne Kirkpatrick. The film originally had no songs until six months into production when the suggestion of making the film a musical came from Toby Emmerich, who was recently elected as chairman of the Warner Bros. Pictures Group at the time, partially because the Kirkpatrick brothers had previously written the music and lyrics for the Tony-winning Broadway musical Something Rotten!.

The songs include "Perfection" performed by Channing Tatum, "Wonderful Life" performed by Zendaya, "Percy's Pressure" performed by James Corden (music from the song "Under Pressure", additional lyrics by Karey and Wayne Kirkpatrick), "Wonderful Questions" performed by Tatum & Zendaya, "Let It Lie" performed by Common, "Moment of Truth" performed by CYN, and "Finally Free" performed by Niall Horan (written by Horan, Ian Franzino, Andrew Hass, John Ryan and Julian Bunetta).

The soundtrack peaked at number 8 on the Billboard 200. The song "Finally Free" peaked on a couple of Billboard charts including number 39 on the Mexico Ingles Airplay chart and number 2 on the Bandsintown X Billboard Top Livestream Artists chart.

== Release ==
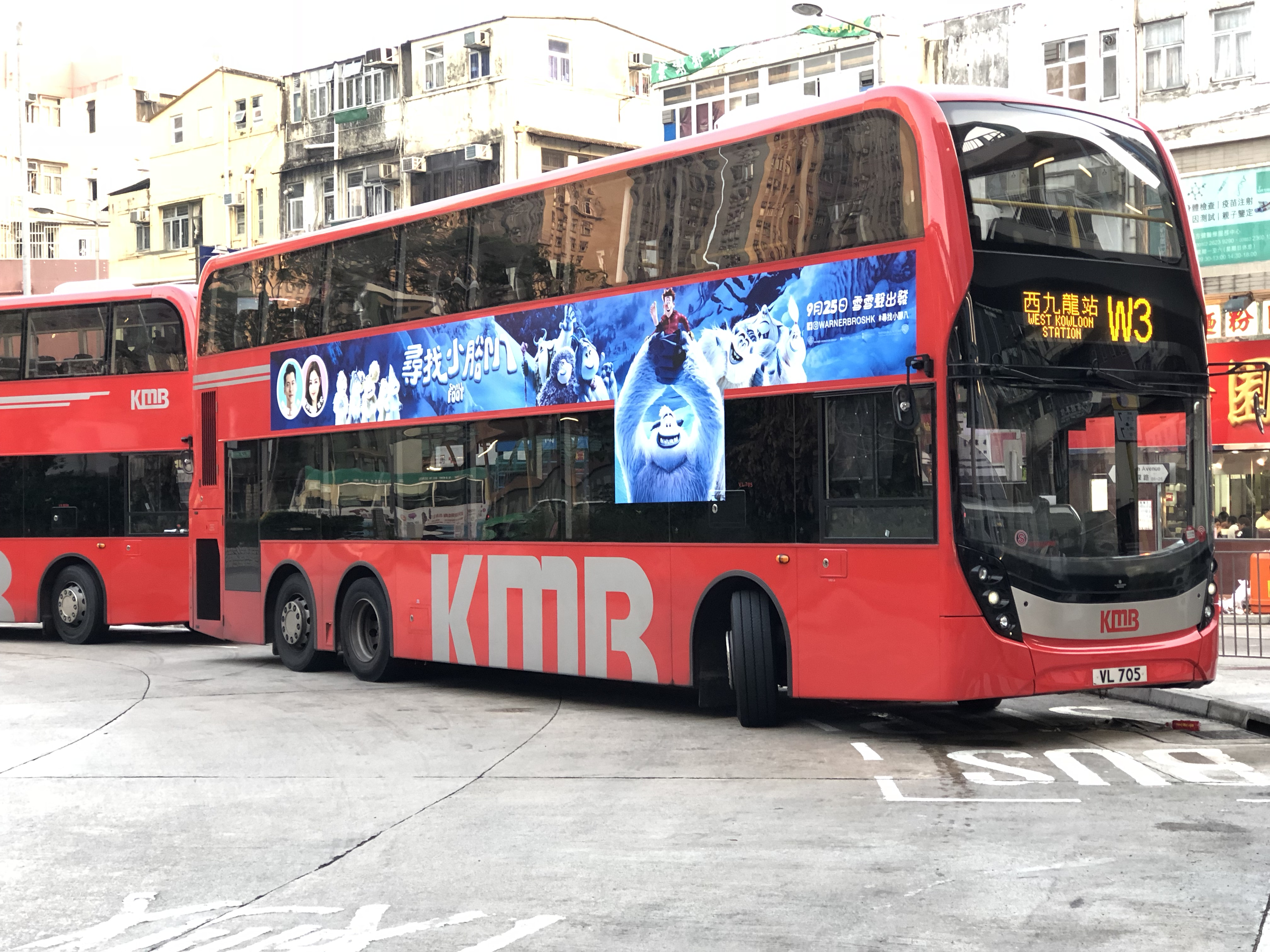
A bus advertising the film in Hong Kong

The film was released on September 28, 2018.

=== Marketing ===
In late summer 2018, American pizza chain Chuck E. Cheese's announced that they would be the official partner of the film. Marketing materials for the film, in particular a series of posters in Los Angeles advertising the cast of the film with phrases such as "Zendaya is Meechee", turned into a minor Internet meme (in a short song by Gabriel Gundacker).

=== Home media ===
Smallfoot was released on Digital on iTunes, Movies Anywhere, Microsoft Store, Vudu, and Amazon Prime on December 4, 2018, and on DVD, Blu-ray, Blu-Ray 3D and Digital Copy on December 11, 2018. The releases also included a short film, titled Super Soozie.

== Reception ==
=== Box office ===
Smallfoot grossed $83.2 million in the United States and Canada, and $130.9 million in other territories, for a total worldwide gross of $214.1 million.

In the United States and Canada, Smallfoot was released alongside Night School, Little Women and Hell Fest, and was projected to gross $25–30 million from 4,131 theaters in its opening weekend. The film made $6.5 million on its first day, including $850,000 from Thursday night previews, more than the Warner Animation Group's previous September release Storks ($435,000 in 2016). It went on to debut to $23 million, finishing second at the box office behind Night School. It made $14.3 million in its second weekend and $9.1 million in its third, dropping 37% each time and finishing third and fifth, respectively.

=== Critical response ===
On review aggregator Rotten Tomatoes, the film holds an approval rating of 76% based on 129 reviews, with an average rating of 6.3/10. The website's critical consensus reads, "Smallfoot offers a colorful distraction that should keep younger viewers entertained - and a story whose message might even resonate with older audiences." On Metacritic, the film has a weighted average score of 60 out of 100, based on 25 critics, indicating "mixed or average reviews". Audiences polled by CinemaScore gave the film an average grade of "A−" on an A+ to F scale, while PostTrak reported filmgoers gave it 4 out of 5 stars.

=== Accolades ===
Award	Date of ceremony	Category	Recipients	Result	Ref.
Alliance of Women Film Journalists	January 10, 2019	Best Animated Feature Film	Karey Kirkpatrick; Jason Reisig	Nominated	
Alliance of Women Film Journalists	January 10, 2019	Best Animated Female	Zendaya as Meechee	Nominated	
Annie Awards	February 2, 2019	Annie Award for Music in a Feature Production	Heitor Pereira, Karey Kirkpatrick, Wayne Kirkpatrick	Nominated	
Detroit Film Critics Society	December 3, 2018	Best Animated Feature	Smallfoot	Nominated	
Heartland Film Festival	October 11–21, 2018	Truly Moving Picture Award	Smallfoot	Won	
Hollywood Music in Media Awards	November 14, 2018	Original Score – Animated Film	Heitor Pereira	Nominated	
Hollywood Music in Media Awards	November 14, 2018	Original Song – Animated Film	Niall Horan	Nominated	
Kids' Choice Awards	March 23, 2019	Favorite Male Voice from an Animated Movie	Channing Tatum	Nominated	
Kids' Choice Awards	March 23, 2019	Favorite Female Voice from an Animated Movie	Zendaya	Nominated	
Kids' Choice Awards	March 23, 2019	Favorite Female Voice from an Animated Movie	Yara Shahidi	Nominated	
Visual Effects Society Awards	February 5, 2019	Outstanding Effects Simulations in an Animated Feature	Henrik Karlsson, Theo Vandernoot, Martin Furness, Dmitriy Kolesnik	Nominated	

== Future ==
In September 2018, Ficarra and Requa expressed hope for a sequel, with Requa stating that they "could make a whole other movie just on that shtick that we came up with". Ficarra added "Hopefully, we are lucky enough to be in that position. But you have to wait for the world to digest it to a certain extent [...] We have a myriad of ideas. Just in the discarded notions that we have entertained over the last 6 years."

In October 2018, on the subject of a sequel Kirkpatrick stated, "Haven't gone there yet, but you know it's really just the importance of truth. And the way to get to truth is by asking questions and never losing your sense of wonder and curiosity that leads to bridging a gap between the 'us' and the 'them'. I mean, we are often given misconceptions about things that make us different. And the only way to break through that is to question it and you won't question things without a sense of curiosity and wonder. So never lose that. All the songs basically have something to do with that."

== See also ==
- Missing Link: A 2019 stop-motion animated film that also focuses on a man and a "bigfoot" creature, albeit a sasquatch; yetis do appear as well.
- Abominable: A 2019 CG-animated film that also focuses on the interaction between humans and a yeti.
