= Little Women (2018 film) =

- Theatrical release poster
- Directed by: Clare Niederpruem
- Written by: Clare Niederpruem; Kristi Shimek
- Based on: Little Women; 1868 novel by Louisa May Alcott
- Produced by: Maclain Nelson; Kristi Shimek; Stephen Shimek; David M. Wulf
- Starring: Sarah Davenport; Allie Jennings; Lucas Grabeel; Ian Bohen; Lea Thompson
- Cinematography: Anka Malatynska
- Edited by: Kristi Shimek
- Music by: Robert Allen Elliott
- Production companies: Main Dog Productions; Paulist Productions
- Distributed by: Pure Flix Entertainment; Pinnacle Peak
- Release date: September 28, 2018 (United States)
- Running time: 112 minutes
- Country: United States
- Language: English
- Box office: $12.2 million

Little Women is a 2018 American drama film directed by Clare Niederpruem, from a screenplay by Niederpruem and Kristi Shimek. The sixth film adaptation of Louisa May Alcott's 1868–69 two-volume novel of the same name, it is a modern retelling of the original story and marks the 150th anniversary of the release of the book's first volume. The film stars Sarah Davenport, Allie Jennings, Lucas Grabeel, Ian Bohen, and Lea Thompson. It was released in the United States on September 28, 2018, by Pinnacle Peak.

== Plot ==
Set in the early 2000s, four sisters grow up together. Jo is an aspiring writer who travels to New York and eventually marries her professor, Freddy Bhaer. Beth plays the piano, has a battle against cancer throughout the movie, and eventually dies of leukemia. Amy becomes an internationally renowned painter and marries Theodore Laurence (Laurie). Meg, who struggles with wanting to be happily married versus being able to help with her family's finances, marries Laurie's former tutor and has twins.

== Cast ==
- Sarah Davenport as Jo March
  - Aimee Lynne Johnson as Young Jo
- Allie Jennings as Beth March
  - Reese Oliveira as Young Beth
- Melanie Stone as Meg March
- Taylor Murphy as Amy March
  - Elise Jones as Young Amy
- Lucas Grabeel as Theodore "Laurie" Laurence
- Stuart Edge as John Brooke
- Ian Bohen as Frederick "Freddy" Bhaer
- Lea Thompson as Marmee March
- Bart Johnson as Papa March
- Adam Johnson as Duke Senior
- Michael Flynn as Mr. Laurence
- Barta Heiner as Aunt March

== Production ==
In April 2017, it was announced Lea Thompson and Lucas Grabeel had joined the cast of the directorial debut of Clare Niederpruem, directing from a screenplay she wrote alongside Kristi Shimek, based upon the novel of the same name by Louisa May Alcott. Maclain Nelson and Stephen Shimek will serve as producers on the film, while Chris Donahue and Marybeth Sprows, will executive produce the film under their Main Dog Productions and Paulist Productions banners, respectively. In June 2017, Sarah Davenport and Ian Bohen joined the cast of the film.

Principal photography began in June 2017, in Salt Lake City, Utah.

== Music ==
=== Track listing ===
Track listing adapted from IMDb

Title	Performed by	written/arranged by	produced by	Courtesy/publishing
Little Bit of Grace	Performed by Benj Heard			Courtesy of The Music Bed, LLC
Angels We Have Heard On High	Performed by Kayliann	Traditional French Carol Lyrics written by James Chadwick, Arranged by Doug Lowe & Kayliann		
I'm Getting Better All the Time	Performed by Barbara			Pittman Courtesy of The Music Bed, LLC
Count Bassy	Written and Performed by Matt Mattson	Written and Performed by Matt Mattson		
Saturday Night	Written and Performed by Stella Mwangi	Written and Performed by Stella Mwangi	Produced by Rumblin Music Courtesy of Badili Akili From the album Living for Music Published by Tono Norway	
Single	Performed by Sean & Blake	Written by Santoy Campbell & Blake Andrew	Produced by Mantra Beats	
Stay Young	Performed by Sean & Blake	Written by Santoy Campbell & Blake Andrew	Produced by Anthony Pisano	
Human Right	Performed by The Str!ke	Written by Chris Crabb, Jarrett Burns, Jesse Williams & Chase Baker		Published by The Str!ke, LLC
Auld Lang Syne	Performed by Hannah Miller			Courtesy of The Music Bed, LLC
Beautiful Day	Performed by Lucas Grabeel	Written by Chris Crabb and Jarrett Burns		Courtesy of Jazzy Squares Inc. Publishing Courtesy of Banshee Inc. Publishing
Alive	Performed by Tyrone Biggs	Written by Tyrone Biggs, Josh Glazer, and Jonathan Muro		
Get Up and Go	Written and Performed by Stella Mwangi	Written and Performed by Stella Mwangi	Produced by Big City From the EP 'Stella Mwangi'	Courtesy of Position Music/The Music Bed, LLC Published by Tono Norway
Swans	Performed by The Format Written by Nate Ruess & Sam Means			Courtesy of The Vanity Label Deck the Halls Performed by The Cast of Little Women
Traditional Welsh Carol	Performed by Allie Jennings From the ballet Swan Lake	Lyrics written by Thomas Oliphant Swan Lake, Op. 30 Written by Pyotr Ilyich Tchaikovsky		
When I Go	Performed by Jessica Frech	Written by Russell Dixon (BMI) & Scott Krippayne Pirk Music (BMI)		Courtesy of Seven Stories Entertainment Inc.
Angels We Have Heard On High	Performed by Allie Jennings & The Cast of Little Women Traditional French Carol	Lyrics written by James Chadwick		Courtesy of Raincoat Records Courtesy of Sea Boot Cafe Publishing
No Ordinary Life	Performed by Gayle Skidmore			Courtesy of Nicole Sheahan Music
Chapters of My Heart	Written and Performed by Nicole Sheahan	Written and Performed by Nicole Sheahan		Courtesy of Lost Slipper Music Courtesy of Prize Pig Music Courtesy of Shakes Spear Music
Heartbeat	Performed by Kayliann	Written by Doug Lowe, Pete Sallis, & Kayliann		
All the Things	Performed by Lucas Grabeel	Written by Lucas Grabeel		Courtesy of 14341 Music Courtesy of Naked Banshee Publishing Release

== Release ==
In June 2018, it was announced Pinnacle Peak and Pure Flix Entertainment would distribute the film. It was released in the United States on September 28, 2018.

=== Box office ===
In the United States and Canada, Little Women was released alongside Smallfoot, Night School and Hell Fest, and was projected to gross $3–5 million from 643 theaters in its opening weekend. It ended up grossing just $747,000, finishing 16th at the box office.

=== Critical response ===
According to the review aggregator website Rotten Tomatoes, 30% of critics have given the film a positive review based on 27 reviews, with an average rating of 4.9/10. The site's critics consensus reads, "This updated version of Little Women may hold some appeal for newcomers, but fans of the classic source material have far better adaptations to choose from." At Metacritic, the film has a weighted average score of 40 out of 100 based on 11 critic reviews, indicating "mixed or average" reviews. Nell Minow of RogerEbert.com gave it 3 out of 4 stars and wrote, "For devotees, the essence of the Little Women story remains, and, for newcomers, it is a sweet film that should inspire them to explore the book and the more traditional adaptations." But Elizabeth Weitzman of The Wrap gave it low marks, writing, "The girls in this contemporary retelling ... are not messy and complex human beings but Hallmark Channel characters, two-dimensional symbols of virtuous nostalgia."
