= Ely Henry =

Canadian-American actor and comedian

- Education: Unionville
- Alma mater: Sheridan College
- Occupations: Actor, comedian, singer, songwriter, writer
- Years active: 2004–present

Ely Henry is a Canadian-American actor and comedian. He is best known for his roles in Smallfoot, Some Freaks and NCIS: Origins.

== Career ==
Henry worked on the television series Roadies, created by Cameron Crowe.

After working as a temporary voice (also known as a scratch vocal) for the animated film Smallfoot, he was invited to join the main cast.

Henry co-starred in the short-lived NBC comedy titled Connecting, created by Martin Gero and Brendan Gall. The series is set during the ongoing COVID-19 pandemic in the United States. He currently recurs as Philip "Phil" Elertson in NCIS: Origins since 2024 and appeared as the older version of Phil in NCIS for the NCIS and Origins crossover special in 2025.

== Filmography ==
=== Film ===
Year	Title	Role	Notes
2016	Some Freaks	Elmo Moss	
2018	Smallfoot	Fleem	Voice
2023	Legion of Super-Heroes	Bouncing Boy	Voice, direct-to-video
2023	Taz: Quest for Burger	Aristotle	Voice

=== Television ===
Year	Title	Role	Notes
2007	Nature of the Beast	Garrett	Television film
2006–2007	Monster Warriors	Eustace	3 episodes
2012	I, Martin Short, Goes Home	Stan	Television special
2010	Twisted	Doug	5 episodes
2013–2014	Suburgatory	Reggie	6 episodes
2016	Roadies	Mike Finger	4 episodes
2017	Justice League Action	Noah Kuttler / Calculator	Voice, 2 episodes
2019	Yabba Dabba Dinosaurs	Bamm-Bamm Rubble	Voice, 13 episodes
2019–2020	Where's Waldo?	Edmund	Voice, 2 episodes
2020	Connecting	Rufus	8 episodes
2022	Players	Kyle Braxton	10 episodes
2023–2024	For All Mankind	Dr. Seth Razack	3 episodes
2024–present	NCIS: Origins	Philip "Phil" Elertson	Recurring role
2025	NCIS	Philip "Phil" Elertson	Episode: "Now And Then" (NCIS and NCIS: Origins crossover event)
2026	The Boys	The Worm	Recurring (season 5)
