= List of awards and nominations received by Janelle Monáe =

Janelle Monáe awards and nominations
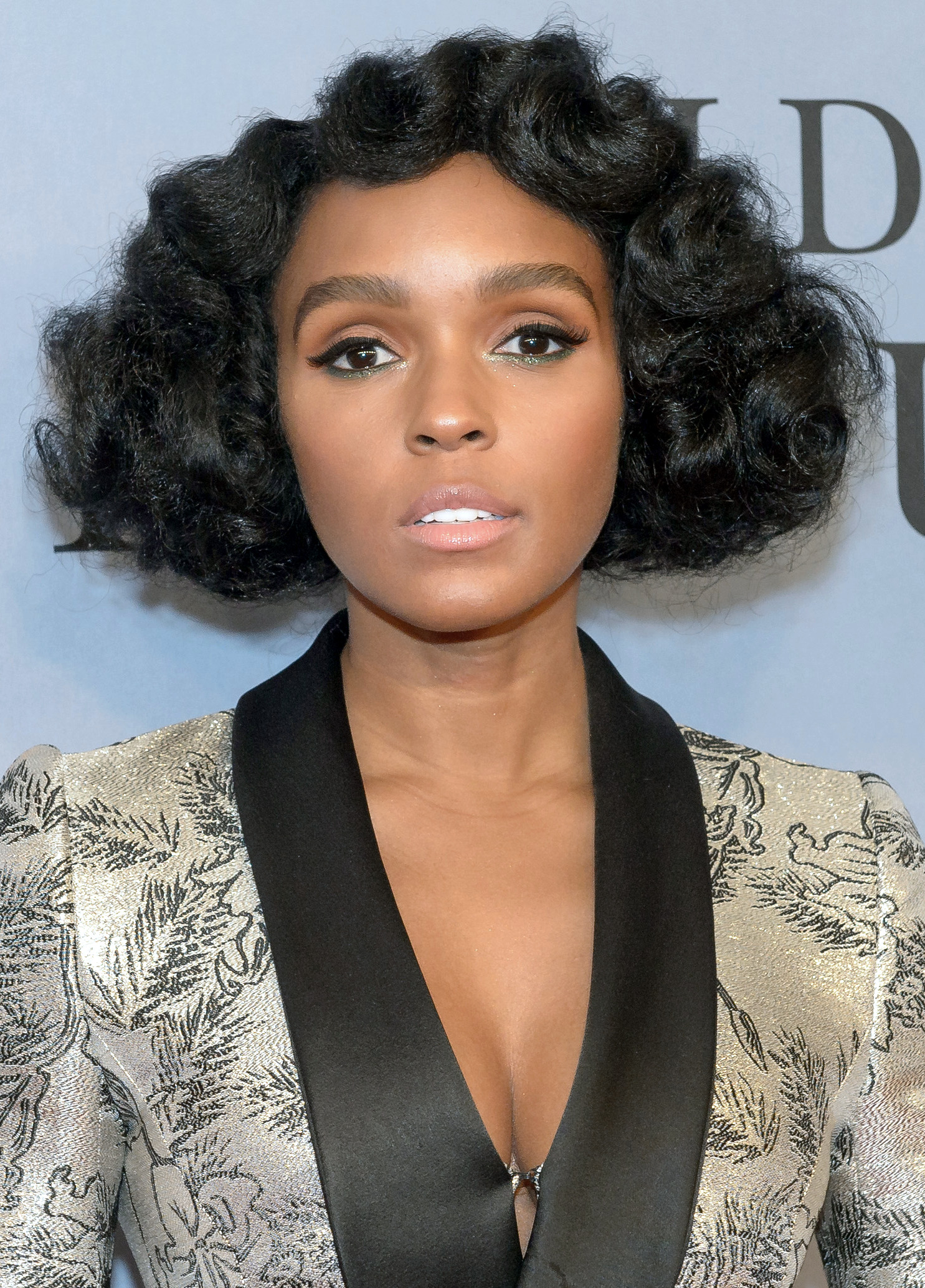
- Janelle Monáe in 2016
Awards and nominations
Award	Wins	Nominations
Black Reel Awards	2	12
Children's and Family Emmy Awards	1	1
Critics' Choice Awards	3	6
Grammy Awards	0	10
MTV Video Music Award	1	7
NAACP Image Awards	1	13
National Board of Review	2	2
Satellite Awards	2	3
Spirit Awards	1	1
Screen Actors Guild Award	1	2
Soul Train Music Awards	3	18

Totals (Note: Certain award groups do not simply award one winner. They acknowledge several different recipients, have runners-up, and have third place. Since this is a specific recognition and is different from losing an award, runner-up mentions are considered wins in this award tally. For simplification and to avoid errors, each award in this list has been presumed to have had a prior nomination.)
- Wins: 66
- Nominations: 186

This is a list of awards and nominations received by Janelle Monáe, an American singer, songwriter, rapper and actress.

Ten-time Grammy Awards nominee, she is currently signed to her own imprint Wondaland Records in connection with Epic Records and Atlantic Records. After her first Grammy Awards nominations for Best Urban/Alternative Performance with the song "Many Moons", she published her debut album The ArchAndroid (2010), receiving two nominations at the Grammy Awards, including for Best Contemporary R&B Album. In 2012 she collaborated with American pop band Fun on "We Are Young", which was nominated at the Grammy Award for Record of the Year and Best Pop Duo/Group Performance. The song won a Teen Choice Award for Choice Music – Single by a Group. In 2013 she published her second studio album The Electric Lady, which featured the "Q.U.E.E.N." with Erykah Badu, winner of a Soul Train Music Awards, an NAACP Image Awards and a MTV Video Music Award. After five years Monae published her third studio album Dirty Computer, nominated at the Grammy Award for Album of the Year. The two album singles "Make Me Feel" and "Pynk" received several nominations, including at the MTV Video Music Award and at the Grammy Award for Best Music Video for the later one. In 2023 she published The Age of Pleasure, which earned her two nominations at the Grammy Awards, for Album of the Year and Best Progressive R&B Album.

In 2016, Monáe ventured into acting and received critical acclaim for her roles as Teresa and Mary Jackson in the films Moonlight and Hidden Figures, respectively. These first two acting roles garnered her several award nominations and wins, alongside the cast, including a Screen Actors Guild Award, a Critics' Choice Award, an Independent Spirit Award and a Satellite Award. In 2022, she starred in Glass Onion: A Knives Out Mystery winning the National Board of Review Award for Best Supporting Actress and a Critics' Choice Movie Awards and a Satellite Awards with the cast. The same year she won a Children's and Family Emmy Award for her writing credit on We the People.

Monáe also received several honors and non-competitive awards. For her singer-songwriter works she was honored with the ASCAP Vanguard Award, two Billboard Women in Music and the Soul Train Music Awards Spirit of Soul Award. For her acting career she was recognized with the Critics' Choice Movie Awards #SeeHer Award and the Santa Barbara International Film Festival Virtuosos Award. Monáe was also honored by the Council of Fashion Designers of America Awards.

== Awards and nominations ==
Award	Year	Work	Category	Result	Ref.
ASCAP Awards	2010	Herself	Vanguard Award	Won	
ASCAP Awards	2019	"I Like That"	Top R&B/Hip-hop songs	Won	
AICE Awards	2019	"I Like That"	Best Color Grading Music Video	Nominated	
BET Awards	2014	Herself	Best Female R&B/Pop Artist	Nominated	
BET Awards	2015	Herself	Best Female R&B/Pop Artist	Nominated	
BET Awards	2017	Herself	Best Actress	Nominated	
BET Awards	2018	"Django Jane"	Bet Her Award	Nominated	
BET Awards	2019	"Pynk"	Bet Her Award	Nominated	
BET Awards	2023	Herself	Best Actress	Nominated	
Billboard Music Awards	2013	"We Are Young (with Fun)	Top Streaming Song (Audio)	Nominated	
Billboard Music Awards	2013	"We Are Young (with Fun)	Top Streaming Song (Video)	Nominated	
Billboard Music Awards	2013	"We Are Young (with Fun)	Top Digital Song	Nominated	
Billboard Music Awards	2013	"We Are Young (with Fun)	Top Rock Song	Nominated	
Billboard Women in Music	2013	Herself	Rising Star Award	Won	
Billboard Women in Music	2018	Herself	Trailblazer of the Year	Won	
Black Girls Rock! Awards	2009	Herself	Who Got Next Award	Won	
Black Girls Rock! Awards	2012	Herself	Young, Gifted & Black Award	Won	
Black Reel Awards	2015	"What is Love"	Outstanding Original Song	Nominated	
Black Reel Awards	2017	Hidden Figures	Outstanding Breakthrough Performance, Female	Nominated	
Black Reel Awards	2017	Hidden Figures	Outstanding Supporting Actress	Won	
Black Reel Awards	2017	Hidden Figures	Outstanding Ensemble	Nominated	
Black Reel Awards	2017	Moonlight	Outstanding Breakthrough Performance, Female	Nominated	
Black Reel Awards	2017	Moonlight	Outstanding Supporting Actress	Nominated	
Black Reel Awards	2017	Moonlight	Outstanding Ensemble	Won	
Black Reel Awards	2018	Electric Dreams	Outstanding Actress, Drama Series	Nominated	
Black Reel Awards	2019	Philip K. Dick's Electric Dreams	Outstanding Actress, TV Movie or Limited Series	Nominated	
Black Reel Awards	2019	Harriet	Outstanding Supporting Actress	Nominated	
Black Reel Awards	2020	Homecoming	Outstanding Actress, Drama Series	Nominated	
Black Reel Awards	2023	Glass Onion: A Knives Out Mystery	Outstanding Supporting Actress	Nominated	
BreakTudo Awards	2019	"Unbreakable" (with Kelly Clarkson)	Best Soundtrack Song	Nominated	
Brit Awards	2014	Herself	International Female Solo Artist	Nominated	
Brit Awards	2019	Herself	International Female Solo Artist	Nominated	
Children's and Family Emmy Awards	2022	We the People	Outstanding Short Form Program	Won	
Critics' Choice Awards	2016	Hidden Figures	Best Supporting Actress	Nominated	
Critics' Choice Awards	2016	Hidden Figures	Best Acting Ensemble	Nominated	
Critics' Choice Awards	2016	Moonlight	Best Acting Ensemble	Won	
Critics' Choice Awards	2023	Herself	#SeeHer Award	Won	
Critics' Choice Awards	2023	Glass Onion: A Knives Out Mystery	Best Supporting Actress	Nominated	
Critics' Choice Awards	2023	Glass Onion: A Knives Out Mystery	Best Acting Ensemble	Won	
Daily Californian Music Awards	2018	Dirty Computer	Best Album	Won	
Daily Californian Music Awards	2018	"Pynk"	Best Song (Non-Billboard)	Runner-up	
Daily Californian Music Awards	2018	Herself	Best Artist	Runner-up	
Edison Jazz-World Awards	2019	Dirty Computer	Soul, Funk, R&B Award	Won	
Essence Awards	2011	Herself	Black Women in Music Award	Won	
Essence Black Women in Hollywood Awards	2017	Herself	Breakthrough Award	Won	
GAFFA Awards (Norway)	2018	Herself	International Artist of the Year	Nominated	
GAFFA Awards (Norway)	2018	Dirty Computer	International Album of the Year	Nominated	
GAFFA Awards (Sweden)	2019	Herself	International Artist of the Year	Nominated	
GAFFA Awards (Sweden)	2019	Dirty Computer	International Album of the Year	Nominated	
GLAAD Media Award		Herself	Outstanding Music Artist	Won	
Grammy Award	2009	"Many Moons"	Best Urban/Alternative Performance	Nominated	
Grammy Award	2011	The ArchAndroid	Best Contemporary R&B Album	Nominated	
Grammy Award	2011	"Tightrope"	Best Urban/Alternative Performance	Nominated	
Grammy Award	2013	Some Nights	Album of the Year (as a featured artist)	Nominated	
Grammy Award	2013	"We Are Young"	Record of the Year	Nominated	
Grammy Award	2013	"We Are Young"	Best Pop Duo/Group Performance	Nominated	
Grammy Award	2019	"Pynk"	Best Music Video	Nominated	
Grammy Award	2019	Dirty Computer	Album of the Year	Nominated	
Grammy Award	2024	The Age of Pleasure	Album of the Year	Nominated	
Grammy Award	2024	The Age of Pleasure	Best Progressive R&B Album	Nominated	
Hollywood Music in Media Awards	2021	"Turntable" (from All In: The Fight for Democracy)	Original Song — Documentary	Nominated	
Hugo Awards	2019	Dirty Computer	Best Dramatic Presentation (Short Form)	Nominated	
Independent Spirit Awards	2016	Moonlight	Robert Altman Award	Won	
International Dance Music Awards	2011	Herself	Best Breakthrough Artist	Nominated	
MOBO Awards	2010	Herself	Best International Act	Nominated	
MTV Europe Music Awards	2012	"We Are Young" (with Fun)	Best Song	Nominated	
MTV Video Music Award	2010	"Tightrope"	Best Choreography	Nominated	
MTV Video Music Award	2012	"We Are Young" (with Fun)	Best Pop Video	Nominated	
MTV Video Music Award	2013	"Q.U.E.E.N." (with Erykah Badu)	Best Art Direction	Won	
MTV Video Music Award	2018	"Pynk"	Best Video with a Message	Nominated	
MTV Video Music Award	2018	"Make Me Feel"	Best Art Direction	Nominated	
MTV Video Music Award	2018	"Make Me Feel"	Best Editing	Nominated	
MTV Video Music Award	2023	"Lipstick Lover"	Best Cinematography	Nominated	
MTV Video Music Awards Japan	2013	"We Are Young" (with Fun)	Best Group Video	Nominated	
MTV Video Music Awards Japan	2013	"We Are Young" (with Fun)	Best New Artist	Nominated	
MTV Video Music Awards Japan	2013	"We Are Young" (with Fun)	Best Rock Video	Nominated	
MTV Video Music Brazil Awards	2010	Herself	Aposta Internacional (International Bet)	Nominated	
Much Music Video Awards	2017	"Venus Fly" (with Grimes)	Best EDM/Dance Video	Won	
Much Music Video Awards	2017	"Venus Fly" (with Grimes)	Best Director	Nominated	
Much Music Video Awards	2017	"Venus Fly" (with Grimes)	Best Pop Video	Nominated	
Much Music Video Awards	2017	"Venus Fly" (with Grimes)	Fan Fave Video	Nominated	
NAACP Image Award	2014	Herself	Outstanding Female Artist	Nominated	
NAACP Image Award	2014	"Q.U.E.E.N." (with Erykah Badu)	Outstanding Music Video	Won	
NAACP Image Award	2014	"Q.U.E.E.N." (with Erykah Badu)	Outstanding Song	Nominated	
NAACP Image Award	2014	The Electric Lady	Outstanding Album	Nominated	
NAACP Image Award	2019	Herself	Outstanding Female Artist	Nominated	
NAACP Image Award	2019	Dirty Computer	Outstanding Album	Nominated	
NAACP Image Award	2020	Harriet	Outstanding Ensemble Cast in a Motion Picture	Nominated	
NAACP Image Award	2020	Harriet	Outstanding Supporting Actress in a Motion Picture	Nominated	
NAACP Image Award	2021	Antebellum	Outstanding Actress in a Motion Picture	Nominated	
NAACP Image Award	2023	Glass Onion: A Knives Out Mystery	Outstanding Supporting Actress in a Motion Picture	Nominated	
NAACP Image Award	2024	Herself	Outstanding Female Artist	Nominated	
NAACP Image Award	2024	"Lipstick Lover"	Outstanding Soul/R&B Song	Nominated	
NAACP Image Award	2024	The Age of Pleasure	Outstanding Album	Nominated	
National Board of Review	2017	Hidden Figures	Best Cast	Won	
National Board of Review	2023	Glass Onion: A Knives Out Mystery	Best Supporting Actress	Won	
Nebula Award	2019	Dirty Computer	Bradbury Award	Nominated	
NME Awards	2011	"Tightrope"	Best Track	Won	
O Music Awards	2011	The ArchAndroid	Best iTunes LP	Nominated	
People's Choice Awards	2013	We Are Young (with Fun)	Favorite Song of the Year	Nominated	
Pop Awards	2021	"Turntables"	Music Video of the Year	Nominated	
Q Awards	2012	"We Are Young" (with Fun)	Best Trak	Nominated	
Q Awards	2018	"Make Me Feel"	Best Trak	Nominated	
Q Awards	2018	Herself	Best Solo Artist	Nominated	
Queerty Awards	2018	"Pynk"	Queer anthem	Won	
Queerty Awards	2018	Herself	Badass	Won	
Satellite Awards	2017	Hidden Figures	Best Cast – Motion Picture	Won	
Satellite Awards	2023	Glass Onion: A Knives Out Mystery	Best Cast – Motion Picture	Won	
Satellite Awards	2023	Glass Onion: A Knives Out Mystery	Best Actress – Motion Picture Comedy or Musical	Nominated	
Screen Actors Guild Award	2017	Hidden Figures	Outstanding Performance by a Cast in a Motion Picture	Won	
Screen Actors Guild Award	2017	Moonlight	Outstanding Performance by a Cast in a Motion Picture	Nominated	
Soul Train Music Awards	2010	Herself	Centric Award	Won	
Soul Train Music Awards	2010	"Tightrope"	Best Dance Performance	Nominated	
Soul Train Music Awards	2013	Herself	Best R&B/Soul Artist	Nominated	
Soul Train Music Awards	2013	"Q.U.E.E.N." (with Erykah Badu)	The Ashford and Simpson Songwriter's Award	Nominated	
Soul Train Music Awards	2013	"Q.U.E.E.N." (with Erykah Badu)	Best Dance Performance	Nominated	
Soul Train Music Awards	2013	"Q.U.E.E.N." (with Erykah Badu)	Video of the Year	Won	
Soul Train Music Awards	2013	"Q.U.E.E.N." (with Erykah Badu)	Best Collaboration	Nominated	
Soul Train Music Awards	2014	Herself	Best R&B/Soul Female Artist	Nominated	
Soul Train Music Awards	2014	The Electric Lady	Album of the Year	Nominated	
Soul Train Music Awards	2014	"Electric Lady" (with Solange Knowles)	Best Dance Performance	Nominated	
Soul Train Music Awards	2014	"PrimeTime" (with Miguel)	Best Collaboration	Nominated	
Soul Train Music Awards	2015	Herself	Best R&B/Soul Female Artist	Nominated	
Soul Train Music Awards	2015	"Yoga"	Best Dance Performance	Nominated	
Soul Train Music Awards	2023	Herself	Spirit of Soul Award	Won	
Soul Train Music Awards	2023	Herself	Best R&B/Soul Female Artist	Nominated	
Soul Train Music Awards	2023	The Age of Pleasure	Album of the Year	Nominated	
Soul Train Music Awards	2023	"Lipstick Lover"	Song of the Year	Nominated	
Soul Train Music Awards	2023	"Lipstick Lover"	Video of the Year	Nominated	
Shorty Awards	2018	Herself	Music - Arts & Entertainment	Nominated	
Teen Choice Awards	2012	"We Are Young" (with Fun)	Choice Rock Song	Nominated	
Teen Choice Awards	2012	"We Are Young" (with Fun)	Choice Single by a Group	Won	
UK Music Video Awards	2018	Herself	Best Artist	Nominated	
Variety Awards	2014	Herself	Breakthrough in Music Award	Won	

== Critics awards ==
Critics' Awards
Year	Nominated work	Category	Result	Ref.
Awards Circuit Community Awards
2016	Moonlight	Best Cast Ensemble	Won	
2016	Hidden Figures	Best Cast Ensemble	Nominated	
2016	Hidden Figures	Best Actress in a Supporting Role	Nominated	
African-American Film Critics Association Awards
2017	Hidden Figures	Best Ensemble	Won	
2017	Herself	Breakout Performance	Won	
2023	Glass Onion: A Knives Out Mystery	Best Ensemble	Won	
Alliance of Women Film Journalists EDA Awards
2017	Hidden Figures and Moonlight	Best Breakthrough Performance	Nominated	
2023	Glass Onion: A Knives Out Mystery	Best Actress in a Supporting Role	Nominated	
Atlanta Film Critics Circle Awards
2022	Glass Onion: A Knives Out Mystery	Best Supporting Actress	Won	
2022	Glass Onion: A Knives Out Mystery	Best Ensemble Cast	Won	
Austin Film Critics Association Awards
2016	Moonlight	Special Honorary Award (for excellence as an ensemble)	Won	
2023	Glass Onion: A Knives Out Mystery	Best Supporting Actress	Nominated	
2023	Glass Onion: A Knives Out Mystery	Best Ensemble	Nominated	
Boston Online Film Critics Association Awards
2016	Moonlight	Best Ensemble	Won	
Boston Society of Film Critics Awards
2016	Moonlight	Best Cast	Won	
Capri Hollywood International Film Festival Awards
2016	Glass Onion: A Knives Out Mystery	Best Ensemble Cast	Won	
Chicago Film Critics Awards
2016	Hidden Figures	Best Supporting Actress	Nominated	
2016	Herself	Most Promising Performer	Nominated	
2022	Glass Onion: A Knives Out Mystery	Best Supporting Actress	Nominated	
Dallas–Fort Worth Film Critics Association Awards
2022	Glass Onion: A Knives Out Mystery	Best Supporting Actress	5th place	
Dorian Awards
2023	Glass Onion: A Knives Out Mystery	Supporting Film Performance of the Year	Nominated	
Florida Film Critics Circle Awards
2016	Moonlight	Best Ensemble	Runner-up	
Georgia Film Critics Association
2023	Glass Onion: A Knives Out Mystery	Best Supporting Actress	Runner-up	
2023	Glass Onion: A Knives Out Mystery	Best Supporting Actress	Won	
Hollywood Critics Association Awards
2023	Glass Onion: A Knives Out Mystery	Best Cast Ensemble	Nominated	
Hollywood Film Awards
2014	"What Is Love?"	Best Song	Won	
2016	Hidden Figures	Spotlight Award	Won	
Houston Film Critics Society Awards
2022	Glass Onion: A Knives Out Mystery	Best Supporting Actress	Nominated	
2022	Glass Onion: A Knives Out Mystery	Best Ensemble Cast	Nominated	
Miami International Film Festival
2022	Glass Onion: A Knives Out Mystery	Ensemble Award	Won	
New York Film Critics Online Awards
2016	Moonlight	Best Ensemble	Won	
2022	Glass Onion: A Knives Out Mystery	Best Ensemble	Won	
Online Film & Television Association Awards
2017	Hidden Figures	Best Breakthrough Performance: Female	Nominated	
Palm Springs International Film Festival
2017	Hidden Figures	Ensemble Performance Award	Won	
Queerty Awards
2020	Harriet	Best Film Performance	Nominated	
San Diego Film Critics Society Awards
2016	Moonlight	Best Ensemble	Nominated	
2022	Glass Onion: A Knives Out Mystery	Best Ensemble	Nominated	
Santa Barbara International Film Festival
2016	Herself	Virtuosos Award	Won	
Seattle Film Critics Society
2016	Moonlight	Best Ensemble	Won	
2022	Glass Onion: A Knives Out Mystery	Best Actress in a Supporting Role	Nominated	
Southeastern Film Critics Association Awards
2016	Moonlight	Best Ensemble	Won	
St. Louis Gateway Film Critics Association Awards
2022	Glass Onion: A Knives Out Mystery	Best Supporting Actress	Runner-up	
2022	Glass Onion: A Knives Out Mystery	Best Ensemble	Runner-up	
Vancouver Film Critics Circle Awards
2022	Glass Onion: A Knives Out Mystery	Best Supporting Actress	Nominated	
Washington D.C. Area Film Critics Association Awards
2016	Moonlight	Best Ensemble	Nominated	
2022	Glass Onion: A Knives Out Mystery	Best Supporting Actress	Nominated	
2022	Glass Onion: A Knives Out Mystery	Best Acting Ensemble	Won	
Women Film Critics Circle Awards
2019	Harriet	Invisible Woman Award	Won	
2021	Antebellum	Courage in Acting Award	Won	
2021	Antebellum	Best Female Action Hero	Won	

== Miscellaneous ==
=== Council of Fashion Designers of America Awards ===
Year	Nominee / work	Award	Result
2017	Herself	Board of Directors’ Tribute	Won
2018	Janelle Monáe	American Ingenuity Award	Won
