= Special education (disambiguation) =

Special education is the practice of educating students in a way that addresses their individual differences and needs.

Special Education may also refer to:

- "Special Education" (Glee), an episode of the American musical television series Glee
- Special Education (film), a 1977 Yugoslav drama
- "Special Education" (song), a 2013 song by Goodie Mob featuring Janelle Monáe
