= Dance Apocalyptic =

Single by Janelle Monáe

from the album The Electric Lady
- Released: July 2, 2013
- Genre: Dance-pop; new wave; rock; doo-wop; Motown; hip-hop
- Length: 3:26
- Label: Wondaland Arts Society; Bad Boy; Atlantic
- Songwriters: Janelle Monáe; Charles Joseph II; Nathaniel Irvin III
- Producers: Wonder; Lightning; Monáe

Janelle Monáe singles chronology
| "Special Education" (2013) | "Dance Apocalyptic" (2013) | "PrimeTime" (2013) |

Music video
- "Dance Apocalyptic" on YouTube

"Dance Apocalyptic" is a song by Janelle Monáe, issued as the second single from her second studio album, The Electric Lady. The song was co-written with Charles Joseph II and Nathaniel Irvin III, and Monae, Chuck Lightning and Nate "Rocket" Wonder providing production. "Dance Apocalyptic" is a dance-pop song with elements of hip-hop, doo-wop, rock, Motown, and new wave. The song is built on kick-drums, keyboards, an electric guitar, scratching and synthesizers. Lyrically, the song is about dancing and liberation.

"Dance Apocalyptic" received widespread positive reviews, with critics noting its catchiness and feel-good lyrics.

== Composition and lyrics ==
"Dance Apocalyptic" is a dance-pop, new wave rock, doo-wop, Motown and hip-hop song.

== Reception ==
Keith Murphy of Vibe praised the song, calling it an "infectious rave-up" and "the soundtrack to endless summer cookouts".

== Music video ==
The music video was directed by Wendy Morgan. The video features Janelle performing in a vintage style club accompanied by a band wearing black and white. in the midpoint of the video, there is a interruption where a news reporter (played by Janelle) reports on an Apocalypse, similar to the one described in Book of Revelation, with locusts, fires, earthquakes, and the raising of the dead. The video then returns back to Janelle performing as her band destroys their instruments. The video ends with a gang of bikers taking Janelle and her band away.

== Live performances ==
On September 9, 2013, Monáe performed the song on the Late Show with David Letterman. She then performed the song (along with "Electric Lady") on Saturday Night Live on October 26.

== Track listing ==
Dance Apocalyptic Remixes
| No. | Title | Length |
|---|---|---|
| 1. | "Dance Apocalyptic" (Chocolate Puma Remix) | 5:32 |
| 2. | "Dance Apocalyptic" (Olugbenga Edit) | 4:09 |

== Charts ==
| Chart (2013) | Peak position |
|---|---|
| Japan Hot 100 (Billboard) | 83 |

== Release history ==
Release dates and formats for "Dance Apocalyptic"
| Region | Date | Format | Label(s) | Ref. |
|---|---|---|---|---|
| United States | November 5, 2013 | Mainstream airplay | Atlantic | |
