= The Electric Lady =

Studio album by Janelle Monáe
- Released: September 6, 2013
- Recorded: 2011–2013
- Studios: Wondaland, Atlanta; EastWest, Hollywood
- Genre: Progressive soul
- Length: 67:35
- Labels: Wondaland Arts Society; Bad Boy; Atlantic
- Producers: Roman GianArthur; Janelle Monáe; Wonder & Lightning; Nate "Rocket" Wonder

Janelle Monáe chronology
| The ArchAndroid (2010) | The Electric Lady (2013) | Wondaland Presents: The Eephus (2015) |

Alternative cover
- Target exclusive edition cover

Singles from The Electric Lady
- 1. "Q.U.E.E.N." Released: April 23, 2013; 2. "Dance Apocalyptic" Released: July 2, 2013; 3. "PrimeTime" Released: August 19, 2013; 4. "Electric Lady" Released: July 30, 2014

The Electric Lady is the second studio album by American singer and songwriter Janelle Monáe, released on September 6, 2013, by Wondaland Arts Society, Bad Boy Records and Atlantic Records. It is the follow-up to her critically acclaimed debut studio album, The ArchAndroid (2010), and likewise, received universal acclaim from music critics. This album serves as the fourth and fifth installments of her seven-part Metropolis concept series. Musically, The Electric Lady incorporates influences of hip hop soul, funk, gospel, jazz, rock, pop, and reggae.

== Background ==
The Electric Lady is the follow-up to Janelle Monáe's debut album The ArchAndroid (2010) and debut EP Metropolis: Suite I (The Chase) (2007), and consists of the fourth and fifth installments of her seven-part Metropolis concept series. Partly inspired by the 1927 film of the same name, the series involves the fictional tale of Cindi Mayweather, a messianic android sent back in time to free the citizens of Metropolis from The Great Divide, a secret society that uses time travel to suppress freedom and love.

Monáe debuted tracks from The Electric Lady at the 2012 Toronto Jazz Festival. The Electric Lady was made available for pre-order through the iTunes Store on July 2, 2013, with "Dance Apocalyptic" as a pre-order bonus. The album features nineteen tracks, although only "Dance Apocalyptic" and previously released single "Q.U.E.E.N." were revealed.

== Writing and lyrical themes ==
Thematically, The Electric Lady continues the dystopic cyborg concepts of its predecessors, while presenting itself in more plainspoken, personal territory in addition to experimenting with genres beyond conventional funk and soul music genres such as jazz, pop punk and gospel, as well as woozy and sensual vocal ballads. As stated on July 30, 2013, by Monáe on Twitter, The Electric Lady are the fourth and fifth suites of her Metropolis concept series. Monáe also stated in an interview with Billboard that The Electric Lady is a prequel to her critically acclaimed 2010 album The ArchAndroid.

The album features guest appearances by Miguel, Erykah Badu, Solange, Prince and Esperanza Spalding with production from previous collaborator, funk duo Deep Cotton, as well as soul music composer Roman GianArthur.

The music video for "Dance Apocalyptic" illustrates many of Monáe's artistic ambitions. The centrality of dance to Monáe's aesthetic reportedly led to obsessing over "how the human body might respond to [her music]", so much so that her musical team "brought early versions of [The Electric Lady's] tracks to Atlanta's fabled strip clubs to see what the women there would dance to."

According to Philadelphia Weekly's Kennedy Allen, Monáe's "Dance Apocalyptic" also takes the dance styles of minstrelsy, which featured "smiling, wide-eyed black performers in shiny livery, their talents on display in subordinate and subservient roles for the enjoyment of white audiences," and repurposes this Sambo imagery into an allegory to "alert a generation to the decaying infrastructure of the urban community." This repurposing fits within a larger history of African-American music and culture developing the art of "signifying, recontextualization, collective memory and resistance" by fashioning icons of opposition to harmful stereotypes and racial conceptions. For Monáe in "Dance Apocalyptic", dancing operates on both a physical and a cerebral level that fits within the historical context of black popular music while also altering how race and gender are conceived and performed.

== Artwork ==
The cover art was painted by Sam Spratt, a New York-based illustrator. Because of the many iterations and revisions made to both the standard and deluxe covers, Monáe herself never actually sat and posed for the artwork. Instead, Spratt was given "thousands of photos from every possible angle, both professional and candid, so [he] had plenty of references to make any possible pose". The cover art was produced in about two months.

The standard edition cover, subtitled Concerning Cindi and Her Sisters and the Skull of Night Thrashings, depicts Cindi Mayweather and her five sisters. Clockwise from left to right: Andromeda, Andy Pisces, Catalina, Morovia, Polly Whynot, and in the front and center, Cindi Mayweather. The artwork pays homage to the work of photographer William Klein, and in particular, the graphic sensibility of his 1966 film Who Are You, Polly Maggoo?. The deluxe edition cover, subtitled Concerning Cindi and the Glow of the Drogon's Eyes, displays Cindi Mayweather alone, proudly showing her Digital Auction Code that shows she is no longer for sale. In this painting, she is an E1 Class android superstar, with full manumission papers.

== Release and promotion ==
The album was released on September 10, 2013, in the United States on Wondaland Arts Society and Bad Boy Records. For promoting the album, Monáe hosted a listening session for press and VIPs at various locations in the country, such as: Illinois, Michigan, New Orleans, Texas, and Washington, D.C. Three short films were uploaded to Monáe's official YouTube account as cinematic advertisements of the upcoming album, days before its release. Aside from the Target deluxe tracks, Prince himself contributed a special "Fashion remix" of "Q.U.E.E.N.". It has since been featured in Chanel's Spring/Summer 2014 Ready-to-Wear show. On September 14, 2013, Monáe performed a set at the 2013 iTunes Festival at The Roundhouse in London. The set included "Sincerely, Jane" from her EP Metropolis; "Suite II Overture", "Cold War", "Tightrope", and "Come Alive (War of the Roses)" from her debut album The Archandroid; and "Dance Apocalyptic", "Q.U.E.E.N.", "Electric Lady", and her cover of "I Want You Back" from The Electric Lady.

=== Singles ===
The first official single, "Q.U.E.E.N." (featuring Erykah Badu), premiered on April 23, 2013, on Monáe's website and was followed by an "emotion picture" music video that debuted on BET's 106 & Park on May 1, 2013. Monáe performed the song alongside Erykah Badu at the closing of the 2013 BET Awards. Monáe also went on to perform the song on Later... with Jools Holland.

The album's second single, "Dance Apocalyptic", was released alongside its emotion picture music video on July 2, 2013. Monáe performed the song the day of her album's release on the Late Show with David Letterman, ultimately dancing on David Letterman's desk and walking out after her performance in a theatrical fashion, to which Letterman proclaimed her as "the hardest working woman in show business". Two days later, she performed the same song on The Today Show, live from Rockefeller Plaza. "Dance Apocalyptic" was sent to US contemporary hit radio on November 5, 2013.

The album's third single, "PrimeTime", was released in August. The music video was officially released in mid-October. The song is a duet with Miguel.

A fourth single from the album, "Electric Lady", was released on July 30, 2014, along with its Greek-themed music video, directed by Alan Ferguson.

== Critical reception ==
Professional ratings
Aggregate scores
| Source | Rating |
|---|---|
| AnyDecentMusic? | 8.0/10 |
| Metacritic | 82/100 |
Review scores
| Source | Rating |
| AllMusic | 4/5 stars |
| The Daily Telegraph | 5/5 stars |
| Entertainment Weekly | B |
| The Guardian | 4/5 stars |
| The Independent | 4/5 stars |
| Los Angeles Times | 2/4 stars |
| NME | 7/10 |
| Pitchfork | 8.3/10 |
| Rolling Stone | 3.5/5 stars |
| Spin | 7/10 |

The Electric Lady received universal acclaim from music critics. At Metacritic, which assigns a rating out of 100 to reviews from mainstream critics, the album has received an average score of 82, based on 37 reviews.

The Guardian's Alexis Petridis called The Electric Lady an "audacious, intrepid and brilliantly executed [album]." Holly Gleason of Paste described it as a "19-track epic that weaves spoken 'radio breaks' with callers, promos and news about Mayweather for a 25th-century immediacy." Peter Tabakis of popular music blog, Pretty Much Amazing, gave it a B+ saying that the album is a "more focused epic" compared to her debut album, The ArchAndroid. Ben Wener of OC Register praised Monáe's "outta-space idiosyncrasies," saying the record "hits hard like Janet Jackson."

In his Pitchfork review, Jayson Greene wrote that "taken as a whole, The Electric Lady is a convincing argument for the virtues of micromanagement, but some of the most powerful, tender moments come from acknowledging limits", and continued writing that "[Monáe]'s not singing to exorcise pain, which will hang around until it's good and ready to go, she's just passing the time until it does doing the thing she does best." Jez Collins of PopMatters mentioned that "as with The Archandroid, Monáe refuses to wear a musical straightjacket" and continued to give a positive review by adding "Monáe is acutely aware of her history, and it's a history to be understood, respected, re-appropriated and re-purposed. But this is never merely pastiche, Monáe takes her history and updates it, makes it relevant and vital for today. This is smart, thought-provoking music. And it will make you want to dance."

Rolling Stone starts by claiming: "You've got to admire an artist who can cut through the weight of her own pretensions." And it continued "The ArchAndroid, was a head-spinning album conceived as parts II and III in an ongoing suite based on Fritz Lang's expressionist silent-film classic Metropolis. This album is parts IV and V, and ... dropping references to sci-fi author Philip K. Dick and ghetto-revolutionary politics." It concludes, "Monáe holds it together through sheer force of freakadelic will and a radical feminist's sense of self-exploration".

=== Accolades ===
Monáe's music video for "Q.U.E.E.N." won Best Art Direction at the 2013 MTV Video Music Awards. Monáe has also been nominated for the Best R&B/Soul Artist at Soul Train Awards, as well as The Ashford and Simpson Songwriter's Award, Best Dance Performance, Video of the Year, and Best Collaboration for "Q.U.E.E.N.". Paste magazine placed "Q.U.E.E.N." at number one on its list of "The 50 Best Songs of 2013". The A.V. Club ranked The Electric Lady at number fourteen on its list of "The 23 best albums of 2013".

== Commercial performance ==
The Electric Lady debuted at number five on the Billboard 200 with first-week sales of 47,000 copies, making it Monáe's highest debut-week sales so far. The album fell to number twenty-three the following week, selling 15,000 copies. In its third week, it dropped to number forty-seven with 9,000 copies sold. The Electric Lady entered the UK Albums Chart at number fourteen, selling 5,498 copies in its first week.

== Track listing ==
Suite IV
| No. | Title | Writer(s) | Producer(s) | Length |
|---|---|---|---|---|
| 1. | "Suite IV Electric Overture" | Roman GianArthur II; Janelle Monáe Robinson; Charles Joseph II | GianArthur | 1:37 |
| 2. | "Givin' Em What They Love" (featuring Prince) | Robinson; Nathaniel Irvin III; Joseph II; Terrence L. Brown | Robinson; Deep Cotton; GianArthur^{[a]} | 4:26 |
| 3. | "Q.U.E.E.N." (featuring Erykah Badu) | Robinson; Irvin III; Joseph II; Kellis Parker Jr.; Irvin | Deep Cotton; Robinson; GianArthur^{[a]} | 5:10 |
| 4. | "Electric Lady" (featuring Solange) | Robinson; Irvin III; Joseph II; Irvin | Deep Cotton; Robinson; GianArthur^{[a]} | 5:08 |
| 5. | "Good Morning Midnight (Interlude)" | Joseph II | | 1:22 |
| 6. | "PrimeTime" (featuring Miguel) | Robinson; Irvin III; Joseph II; Miguel Pimentel; Irvin | Irvin III; GianArthur; Robinson^{[a]}; Joseph II^{[a]} | 4:40 |
| 7. | "We Were Rock & Roll" | Robinson; Irvin III; Joseph II; Irvin; Parker Jr. | Deep Cotton; Robinson; GianArthur | 4:19 |
| 8. | "The Chrome Shoppe (Interlude)" | Joseph II | | 1:10 |
| 9. | "Dance Apocalyptic" | Robinson; Irvin III; Joseph II | Deep Cotton; Robinson | 3:25 |
| 10. | "Look into My Eyes" | Robinson; Irvin III; Joseph II; Brown | Deep Cotton; Robinson | 2:18 |

Suite V
| No. | Title | Writer(s) | Producer(s) | Length |
|---|---|---|---|---|
| 11. | "Suite V Electric Overture" | | GianArthur | 2:20 |
| 12. | "It's Code" | Robinson; GianArthur; Irvin III; Joseph II | GianArthur; Irvin II; Robinson^{[a]}; Joseph II^{[a]} | 4:05 |
| 13. | "Ghetto Woman" | Robinson; Irvin III; Joseph II | Irvin III; GianArthur; Robinson; Joseph II | 4:46 |
| 14. | "Our Favorite Fugitive (Interlude)" | Joseph II | | 1:23 |
| 15. | "Victory" | Robinson; Irvin III; Joseph II; Parker Jr. | Deep Cotton; Robinson; GianArthur | 4:12 |
| 16. | "Can't Live Without Your Love" | Robinson; Irvin III; Joseph II; Irvin | Deep Cotton; Robinson; GianArthur^{[a]} | 3:54 |
| 17. | "Sally Ride" | Robinson; Irvin III; Joseph II; Irvin; Parker Jr. | Deep Cotton; Robinson; GianArthur | 4:08 |
| 18. | "Dorothy Dandridge Eyes" (featuring Esperanza Spalding) | Robinson; Irvin III; GianArthur; Joseph II | Irvin III; GianArthur; Robinson^{[a]}; Joseph II^{[a]} | 4:15 |
| 19. | "What an Experience" | Robinson; Irvin III; Joseph II | Deep Cotton; GianArthur; Robinson | 4:57 |
| Total length: | | | | 67:35 |

Target exclusive edition bonus tracks
| No. | Title | Writer(s) | Producer(s) | Length |
|---|---|---|---|---|
| 20. | "Q.U.E.E.N. (Wondamix)" (featuring Erykah Badu) | Robinson; Irvin III; Joseph II; Parker Jr.; Irvin | Deep Cotton; Robinson; GianArthur^{[b]} | 5:24 |
| 21. | "Electric Lady (Dungeon-Wondamix)" (featuring Big Boi and Cee-Lo Green) | Robinson; Irvin III; Joseph II; Irvin | Deep Cotton; Robinson; Dungeoneze^{[b]} | 3:46 |
| 22. | "Hell You Talmbout" | | Irvin III; GianArthur; Robinson^{[a]}; Joseph II^{[a]} | 3:41 |
| 23. | "I Want You Back" (Jackson 5 cover) | The Corporation | Deep Cotton; GianArthur | 2:49 |
| Total length: | | | | 83:15 |

Japanese edition bonus tracks
| No. | Title | Writer(s) | Producer(s) | Length |
|---|---|---|---|---|
| 20. | "Q.U.E.E.N. (Wondamix)" (featuring Erykah Badu) | Robinson; Irvin III; Joseph II; Parker Jr.; Irvin | Deep Cotton; Robinson; GianArthur^{[b]} | 5:24 |
| 21. | "Electric Lady (Dungeon-Wondamix)" (featuring Big Boi and Cee-Lo Green) | Robinson; Irvin III; Joseph II; Irvin | Deep Cotton; Robinson; Dungeoneze^{[b]} | 3:46 |
| Total length: | | | | 76:45 |

Notes

- ^{^a} signifies a co-producer
- ^{^b} signifies an additional producer
- The Target exclusive edition is divided into two discs, with the second disc beginning with "Suite V Electric Overture".

== Personnel ==
Credits adapted from the liner notes of The Electric Lady.

- Janelle Monáe – additional paintings, backing vocals, co-production, engineering, executive producer, lead vocals, production
- YoungPete Alexander – drums
- Larry Anthony – mastering
- Sachiko Asano – packaging layout
- Erykah Badu – backing vocals, lead vocals
- Marc Baptiste – photography
- Terrence L. Brown – Farfisa organ, organ, Wurlitzer piano
- Christopher Burns – trombone
- Chris Carmouche – mixing
- Sean "Diddy" Combs – executive producer
- Charlie Darker – featured artist
- Deep Cotton – backing vocals
- DJ Cutmaster Swiff – cuts, scratches
- Lacey Duke – featured artist
- Alvern Emmanuel – mixing assistant
- Jason P. Freeman – flugelhorn, trumpet
- Lanre Gaba – A&R administration
- Azza Gallab – featured artist
- George 2.0 – featured artist
- Roman GianArthur – additional bass guitar, additional organ, arrangement, associate producer, backing vocals, clavinet, co-production, drums, engineering, featured artist, Fender Rhodes, flute, glockenspiel, golf balls, guitar, harp, horn arrangements, jazz guitar, lead guitar, Moog bass, Moog synthesizer, organ, percussion, piano, production, rhythm guitar, string arrangements, synthesizer, Wurlitzer piano
- Brandon Gilliard – bass guitar
- Hornz Unlimited – horn arrangements, horn composition
- Dr. Nathaniel Irvin II – acoustic guitar
- Ninjaback Leroy – featured artist
- Marcus Lewis – trombone
- Chuck Lightning – arrangement, art direction, co-production, creative director, executive producer, production
- Mitch "Mitchowski" Martin – A&R direction and coordination, associate producer
- Miguel – backing vocals, engineering, lead vocals
- Vernon Mungo – Pro Tools
- Joshua Newbright – featured artist
- Mia Nunnally – featured artist
- Jeremiah "JHop" Olvera – mixing assistant
- Alexander Page – viola, violin
- Kellindo Parker – additional arrangement, electric guitar, electric guitar solo, guitar, lead guitar, rhythm guitar, solo guitar, ukulele
- Antwan "Big Boi" Patton – co-executive producer
- Rafael Pereira – percussion
- Neal H. Pogue – mixing
- Lance Powlis – additional horn arrangements, trumpet
- Prince – additional bass, additional guitar, backing vocals, lead vocals
- Darryl Reeves – tenor saxophone
- Kenneth Richmond – mixing assistant
- Grace Shim – cello
- Shaan Singh – mixing assistant
- The Skunks – backing vocals
- Solange – backing vocals
- Esperanza Spalding – backing vocals, lead vocals
- Sam Spratt – additional artwork, cover paintings
- Carolyn Tracey – packaging production
- Trombone Shorty – trombone
- Isis Valentino – featured artist
- Randy Warnken – mixing assistant
- Kebbi Williams – flute, tenor saxophone
- Chad Weatherford – additional paintings, costume design
- The Wondaland ArchOrchestra – strings
- Nate "Rocket" Wonder – acoustic guitar, additional guitar, additional horn arrangements, arrangement, backing vocals, bass guitar, drums, engineering, executive producer, Farfisa organ, Fender Rhodes, glockenspiel, horn arrangements, Mellotron, Moog synthesizer, Octican organ, organ, percussion, piano, production, rhythm guitar, string arrangements, Wurlitzer piano
- Trethan Yelurvin – horn
- Andrew Zaeh – photography

== Charts ==
=== Weekly charts ===
| Chart (2013) | Peak position |
|---|---|
| Australian Albums (ARIA) | 22 |
| Australian Urban Albums (ARIA) | 2 |
| Belgian Albums (Ultratop Flanders) | 60 |
| Belgian Albums (Ultratop Wallonia) | 72 |
| Danish Albums (Hitlisten) | 11 |
| Dutch Albums (Album Top 100) | 28 |
| Finnish Albums (Suomen virallinen lista) | 40 |
| French Albums (SNEP) | 50 |
| German Albums (Offizielle Top 100) | 68 |
| Irish Albums (IRMA) | 7 |
| Japanese Albums (Oricon) | 160 |
| New Zealand Albums (RMNZ) | 24 |
| Norwegian Albums (VG-lista) | 16 |
| Scottish Albums (Official Charts) | 24 |
| Swiss Albums (Schweizer Hitparade) | 30 |
| Spanish Albums (Promusicae) | 44 |
| UK Albums (Official Charts) | 14 |
| UK R&B Albums (Official Charts) | 2 |
| US Billboard 200 | 5 |
| US Top R&B/Hip-Hop Albums (Billboard) | 3 |

=== Year-end charts ===
| Chart (2013) | Position |
|---|---|
| US Top R&B/Hip-Hop Albums (Billboard) | 56 |

| Chart (2014) | Position |
|---|---|
| US Top R&B/Hip-Hop Albums (Billboard) | 64 |

== Release history ==
| Region | Date | Label |
|---|---|---|
| Ireland | September 6, 2013 | Atlantic |
| Netherlands | September 6, 2013 | Warner Music |
| France | September 9, 2013 | Warner Music |
| United Kingdom | September 9, 2013 | Atlantic |
| United States | September 10, 2013 | Wondaland Arts Society; Bad Boy |
| Australia | September 13, 2013 | Warner Music |
| Germany | September 13, 2013 | Warner Music |
| Poland | September 16, 2013 | Warner Music |
| Italy | September 17, 2013 | Warner Music |
| Japan | September 18, 2013 | Warner Music |
