= Electric Lady (song) =

Single by Janelle Monáe featuring Solange

from the album The Electric Lady
- Released: July 30, 2014
- Recorded: 2013
- Genre: R&B; funk; neo soul
- Length: 5:08
- Label: Wondaland Arts Society; Bad Boy; Atlantic
- Songwriters: Janelle Monáe Robinson; Roman GianArthur Irvin; Nathaniel Irvin III; Charles Joseph II
- Producers: Nate "Rocket" Wonder; GianArthur; Monáe; Chuck Lightning

Janelle Monáe singles chronology
"Heroes" (2014)	"Electric Lady" (2014)	"Yoga" (2015)

Solange singles chronology
"Looks Good with Trouble" (2013)	"Electric Lady" (2014)	"Cranes in the Sky" (2016)

"Electric Lady" is a song by American psychedelic soul and R&B singer Janelle Monáe featuring singer Solange. It was released on July 30, 2014 as the fourth and final single from Monáe's second studio album, The Electric Lady. It uses the "Sunny" chord progression.

The song serves as the title track from the album and is one of the more up-tempo tracks on the album. Taking on the concept of female empowerment, "Electric Lady" focuses on the need for women to be themselves while at the same time maintaining self-control over their bodies and sexuality; therefore, taking the power over women's bodies from men. As with her song, "Q.U.E.E.N.", Monáe raps the climax portion of the song to further get her point across. She describes an electric lady during the rap section claiming, "She can fly you straight to the moon into the ghettos/Wearing tennis shoes or in flats or in stilettos," and "Illuminating all that she touches, eye on the sparrow/A modern day Joan of her Arc, or Mia Farrow."

== Critical reception ==
Writing for Rolling Stone magazine, Ryan Reed describes "Electric Lady" as "a perfect showcase for Monáe's eclectic talents, as she praises the mythical title woman over soulful horns and a shapeshifting groove."

== Music video ==
A music video for the song, directed by Alan Ferguson, was released on July 30, 2014. It features Janelle Monáe as a college student. After saying goodbye to her mother, portrayed by Monáe's real life mother, Janelle leaves the house and attends a Greek party with her sorority sisters, the Electro Phi Betas. During the party, she describes what makes a woman an electric lady while dancing signature black fraternity and sorority dances. Near the end of the video Monáe, now dressed as a band leader, leads the South Atlanta High School marching band as they play their instruments along with the record. The dances were choreographed by Fatima Robinson and Atlanta-based choreographer Sean Bankhead, who both make cameo appearances in the video. T.I., T-Boz, Monica, Esperanza Spalding, Estelle, Joi, and Kimbra also make cameo appearances in the music video.

Brian Mansfield for USA Today described the music video for "Electric Lady" in a short web article, writing, "In the video, Monáe, dressed in a letter jacket and a pink-and-black crop top, helps throw a sorority party that includes an elaborate cupcake display, a step-dancing fraternity and a marching band. The video combines a '70s vibe - right down to the 8-track player in a vintage car - with modern trappings, most noticeably some new Samsung gadgetry."

== Live performances ==
Monáe performed the song during various appearances while promoting the album in 2013. She has performed the song on The Today Show, Saturday Night Live, The Arsenio Hall Show, and the BET award event Black Girls Rock! which previously awarded Monáe with an award in 2012. In a few of her live performances, she moonwalks during the rap portion of the song.

== Track listing ==
Electric Lady – Single
No.	Title	Length
1.	"Electric Lady" (featuring Solange)	5:08
