= Alan Ferguson (director) =

American music video director

- Born: August 5, 1963 (age 63)
- Other name: Sky Dalton
- Occupation: Music video director
- Spouse: Solange Knowles (m. 2014; sep. 2019)

Alan Ferguson (born August 5, 1963) is an American music video director. He is the son of Winifred Hocker Ferguson and William Alfred Ferguson Sr. His father was a U.S. Army veteran and a postal worker.

Ferguson is sometimes credited under the pseudonym Sky Dalton. He won his first Grammy Award for Best Music Video, for Jon Batiste's "Freedom", at the 64th Annual Grammy Awards in 2022.

== Selected music video credits ==
- The Academy Is... – "We've Got a Big Mess on Our Hands" (2007)
- The Isley Brothers featuring Angela Winbush – "Floatin' on Your Love" (1996)
- Armor for Sleep – "The Truth About Heaven" (2005)
- Ashlee Simpson – "Outta My Head (Ay Ya Ya)" (2007)
- Natasha Bedingfield – "Pocketful of Sunshine" (2008)
- Nelly Furtado – "Night Is Young" (2010)
- Beyoncé – "Dance for You" (2011)
- Beyoncé featuring J. Cole – "Party" (2011)
- Boys Like Girls – "The Great Escape" (2007)
- Camila Cabello - "Living Proof" (2019)
- Cobra Starship – "The Church of Hot Addiction" (2006)
- Chris Cornell – "Scream" (2008)
- Chris Cornell – "Part of Me" (2009)
- Chiddy Bang – "Ray Charles" (2012)
- Logic and Marshmello – "Everyday" (2018)
- Miranda Cosgrove – "Kissin U" (2010)
- Mobb Deep – "Front Lines (Hell on Earth)" (1996)
- Fefe Dobson – "Stuttering" (2010)
- Fall Out Boy – "Dance, Dance" (2005)
- Fall Out Boy – "A Little Less Sixteen Candles, a Little More "Touch Me"" (2005)
- Fall Out Boy – "This Ain't a Scene, It's an Arms Race" (2007)
- Fall Out Boy – "The Take Over, the Breaks Over" (2007)
- Fall Out Boy – "Thnks fr th Mmrs" (2007)
- Fall Out Boy – "I'm Like a Lawyer with the Way I'm Always Trying to Get You Off (Me & You)" (2007)
- Fall Out Boy – "I Don't Care" (2008)
- Fall Out Boy – "America's Suitehearts" (2008)
- Fall Out Boy – "What a Catch, Donnie" (2008)
- Gym Class Heroes – "Papercuts" (2005)
- Gym Class Heroes – "Cupid's Chokehold" (2006)
- Gym Class Heroes – "Shoot Down the Stars" (2007)
- Gym Class Heroes – "Clothes Off!!" (2007)
- Jay-Z – "Feelin' It" (1997)
- Jay-Z – "Who You Wit" (1997)
- Start Trouble – "Non Stop" (2004)
- Jewel – "Good Day" (2006)
- John Legend featuring André 3000 – "Green Light" (2008)
- Jidenna featuring Roman GianArthur – "Classic Man" (2015)
- Jill Scott – "Back Together" (2015)
- Janelle Monáe – "Many Moons" (2008)
- Janelle Monáe featuring Erykah Badu – "Q.U.E.E.N." (2013)
- Janelle Monáe featuring Miguel – "PrimeTime" (2013)
- Janelle Monáe – "Electric Lady" (2014)
- Janelle Monáe – "Make Me Feel" (2018)
- Janelle Monáe – "Crazy, Classic, Life" (2018)
- Janelle Monáe – "Lipstick Lover" (2023)
- Panic! at the Disco – "That Green Gentleman (Things Have Changed)" (2008)
- Katy Perry – "Hot n Cold" (2008)
- Lizzo - "Good As Hell" (2019)
- Lizzo - "Truth Hurts" (2019)
- Rise Against – "Help Is on the Way" (2011)
- Rakim – "Guess Who's Back" (1997)
- Solo – "Heaven" (1995)
- Solo – "Touch Me" (1998)
- Solange Knowles - "Cranes in the Sky" (2016)
- Solange Knowles - "Don't Touch My Hair" (2016)
- Tiësto featuring Nelly Furtado – "Who Wants to Be Alone" (2010)
- Tiësto featuring Busta Rhymes – "C'mon (Catch 'Em by Surprise)" (2011)
- Train – "Drive By" (2012)
- Train – "Mermaid" (2013)
- We the Kings – "Check Yes Juliet" (2007)
- Wizkid featuring Drake – "Come Closer" (2017) (Alternative Music Video)
- 112 featuring The Notorious B.I.G. and Mase – "Only You (Bad Boy Remix)" (1996)
- Jon Batiste - "Freedom" (2021)

== Personal life ==
Ferguson married his longtime girlfriend, Solange Knowles, whom he had been dating since 2008, on November 16, 2014. Ferguson is credited as co-director on Solange's "Cranes in the Sky" and "Don't Touch My Hair" videos.

In 2019, Knowles announced via Instagram post that she and Ferguson had "separated, and parted ways".
