= Special Education (song) =

Single by Goodie Mob featuring Janelle Monáe

from the album Age Against the Machine
- Released: June 18, 2013
- Recorded: Winter 2012; Portland, Jamaica
- Genre: Crunk&B; dubstep
- Length: 4:07
- Label: The Right Records; Primary Wave; Atlantic
- Songwriters: Robert Barnett; Willie Knighton; Thomas Calloway; Cameron Gipp; Tramaine Winfrey
- Producers: Young Fyre; Q Rock

Goodie Mob singles chronology
"Fight to Win" (2012)	"Special Education" (2013)

Janelle Monáe singles chronology
"Q.U.E.E.N." (2013)	"Special Education" (2013)	"Dance Apocalyptic" (2013)

"Special Education" is a song performed by hip-hop group Goodie Mob featuring Janelle Monáe, from their 2013 studio album Age Against the Machine. It was released as the first single from the album on June 18, 2013. As part of promotion for the song, a music video directed by John Colombo was released, as well as a 7" vinyl single.

== Background ==
"Special Education" was recorded by the Goodie Mob featuring Janelle Monáe as the first single of their studio album Age Against the Machine (2013) in around Winter 2012, in the Jamaican Geejam Studios. Young Fyre and Q Rock produced the track. It was officially released on June 18, 2013.

== Composition ==
"Special Education" is written to be a song advocating uniqueness, as well as highlighting segregation and discrimination against those with lesser intellectual capabilities.

== Critical reception ==
Eric Black of Rolling Out found the track to be "dope", adding that it "[will] take you back to when being different was cool". Chris Martins of Spin wrote that the song was "a step in the right direction", in comparison with Goodie Mob's "Fight to Win" (2012).

== Music video ==
The music video for "Special Education" was directed by John Colombo. More than four minutes long, it features members of the Goodie Mob singing the song with child actors portraying younger versions of them. There are also anti-bullying elements in the video. Additionally, a lyric video was released.

== Live performances ==
"Special Education" was performed live by Goodie Mob on August 1, 2013, on the Late Night Show with Jimmy Fallon. They sang it live again with group trainee V. Bozeman substituting Janelle Monaé on "The View" and was broadcast by ABC Television. Other live performance locations included the 9:30 Club in Washington D.C. and the Brooklyn Bowl in Long Island.

== Official versions ==
- Album version – 4:07
- Instrumental version – 4:07
