= Many Moons (song) =

Single by Janelle Monáe

from the album Metropolis: Suite I (The Chase)
- Released: August 2008
- Recorded: 2005
- Genre: Funk, contemporary R&B, art rock
- Length: 5:34
- Label: Wondaland Arts Society/Bad Boy Records
- Songwriter(s): Nathaniel Irvin III, Charles Joseph II, Janelle Monáe Robinson
- Producer(s): Nate Wonder, Chuck Lightning, Janelle Monáe

Janelle Monáe singles chronology
"Sincerely, Jane." (2008)	"Many Moons" (2008)	"Tightrope" (2010)

"Many Moons" is a 2008 song by American singer Janelle Monáe, included on the Metropolis: Suite I (The Chase) album. It was number 47 on Rolling Stone's list of the 100 Best Songs of 2008. The song was also nominated for Best Urban/Alternative Performance at the 51st Grammy Awards. The song's opening section, which involves a refrain of "voodoo," borrows both musically and lyrically from the "Pinball Number Count" song from Sesame Street, which was performed by The Pointer Sisters.

== Music video ==
The video, which Monáe promoted as a short film, takes place at the Annual Android Auction in the fictional city of Metropolis. During the auction, Monae's alter-ego Cindi Mayweather performs for the crowd, while the other androids walk down the catwalk. They are being auctioned off to the wealthiest of Metropolis, such as technology moguls, city officials, religious authorities, and crime lords. The current bid for each android is displayed, with each costing billions of British pounds. Cindi eventually performs so feverishly that she shorts out, and is taken away by Lady Maestra, Master of the ShowDroids (another alter-ego). The video was directed by Alan Ferguson.

== Critical reception ==
The song received a positive critical reception. Random JPop wrote "'Many Moons' follows in the footsteps of 'Violet Stars Happy Hunting' by marrying 60's swing with hip-hop undertones ... This sounds very much like an OutKast song - with an unconventional beat that seems hard to catch in places, but sticks a couple of minutes in. The song oozes originality and Janelle's operatic runs are hot. So many different genres and styles get fused into this song, yet they all unify so well."
