= PrimeTime (song) =

- "PrimeTime Remixes" single cover

Single by Janelle Monáe featuring Miguel

from the album The Electric Lady
- Released: August 19, 2013
- Genre: R&B; soul
- Length: 4:40
- Label: Wondaland Arts Society; Bad Boy; Atlantic
- Songwriters: Janelle Monáe Robinson; Roman GianArthur Irvin; Nathaniel Irvin III; Charles Joseph II; Miguel Jontel Pimentel
- Producers: Nate "Rocket" Wonder; GianArthur; Monáe; Chuck Lightning

Janelle Monáe singles chronology
"Dance Apocalyptic" (2013)	"PrimeTime" (2013)	"What Is Love" (2014)

Miguel singles chronology
"#Beautiful" (2013)	"PrimeTime" (2013)	"Ashley" (2013)

"PrimeTime" is a song by American psychedelic soul and R&B singer Janelle Monáe featuring Miguel. It was released on August 19, 2013, as the third single from Monáe's second studio album, The Electric Lady.

The song has charted at number 20 on the Billboard Bubbling Under Hot 100 Singles chart, and at number 36 on the Hot R&B/Hip-Hop Songs chart.

A single containing two remixes of the song was released digitally on February 25, 2014.

== Critical reception ==
Mark Rozeman of Paste magazine commented that with "PrimeTime" Monáe was "taking things at a slower pace" than in the first two singles from The Electric Lady – "Q.U.E.E.N." and "Dance Apocalyptic" – and called the song a "romantic slow jam" with "soulful guitar".

Spin's Chris Martins wrote that the song is "a classic R&B ballad shaded in with Lynchian '50s haze and powered by the strength of the featured duet. Monáe and the Kaleidoscope dreamer are a natural fit, trading verses and uniting for the chorus ... which should be enough to make Mariah Carey just a little bit jealous," referring to Miguel's collaboration with Carey on "Beautiful".

== Music video ==
A music video for the song, directed by Alan Ferguson, was released on October 10, 2013. It stars Janelle Monáe in the role of Cindi Mayweather, the protagonist of Monáe's Metropolis concept album series, and Miguel as Joey Vice, Mayweather's love interest.

== Track listing ==
PrimeTime Remixes – Single
No.	Title	Length
1.	"PrimeTime" (featuring Miguel) (Kastle Remix)	4:40
2.	"PrimeTime" (featuring Miguel) (Chloe Martini Remix)	4:54

== Charts ==
Chart (2013–14)	Peak position
US Bubbling Under Hot 100 Singles (Billboard)	20
US Hot R&B/Hip-Hop Songs (Billboard)	36

=== Year-end charts ===
Chart (2014)	Position
US Hot R&B Songs (Billboard)	50
