= Metropolis: The Chase Suite =

- The Special Edition features a zoomed in photo of Monáe (as Cindi Mayweather) showing just her torso. The Fantastic Edition features green curtains instead of red.

EP by Janelle Monáe
- Released: August 24, 2007
- Genres: Pop; funk; dance-punk; soul; hip-hop; new wave
- Length: 17:30
- Label: Bad Boy
- Producers: Big Boi (exec.); Janelle Monáe; Control Z; Chuck "Wolfmaster" Lightning

Janelle Monáe chronology
The Audition (2003)	Metropolis: The Chase Suite (2007)	The ArchAndroid (2010)

Singles from Metropolis: Suite I (The Chase)
- 1. "Violet Stars Happy Hunting!!!" Released: June 1, 2007; 2. "Sincerely, Jane." Released: August 25, 2008; 3. "Many Moons" Released: August 2008

Metropolis: The Chase Suite, sometimes known as Metropolis: Suite I (The Chase), is the debut extended play (EP) by American recording artist Janelle Monáe, released August 24, 2007 on Bad Boy Records. Produced by Monáe, Control Z, and Chuck Lightning, the EP constitutes the first installment of Monáe's seven-part Metropolis conceptual series.

The EP debuted at number 115 on the US Billboard 200 chart, selling 5,200 copies in its first week. It was re-released as a special edition on August 12, 2008, and produced three singles, "Violet Stars Happy Hunting!!!", "Sincerely, Jane.", and "Many Moons".

Upon its release, Metropolis: Suite I (The Chase) received critical acclaim from music critics, with "Many Moons" being nominated for Best Urban/Alternative Performance at the 51st Annual Grammy Awards.

== Concept ==
Metropolis: Suite I (The Chase) is the first installment of Monáe's seven-part Metropolis conceptual series, inspired by Fritz Lang's science fiction classic film, Metropolis (1927). It follows a fictional tale of android Cindi Mayweather who is mass-produced in the year 2719 for a market filled with severe social stratification. Mayweather falls in love with a human, and is sentenced to disassembly.

== Critical reception ==
Professional ratings
Review scores
Source	Rating
About.com	4/5 stars
AllMusic	3.5/5 stars
Art Nouveau Magazine	4.5/5 stars
The Boston Globe	favorable
HipHopDX	4/5 stars
The Kansas City Star	favorable
Newsday	B
PopMatters	8/10
Robert Christgau	(dud)
Seattle Times	favorable

Metropolis received critical acclaim upon its release. Mark Nero from About.com gave the EP a positive review saying "Though she's new to the mainstream, the quirky, highly-talented singer Janelle Monae has been putting out music for years. ... If you've heard the original version of the EP, there's no need to pick this up unless you're a diehard fan, but if this is your first exposure to Janelle's music, you're in for a treat. Hip-Hop DX gave the EP a positive review saying, "Even without the random interplanetary references and notions of forbidden robot love, Metropolis has the type of production that takes its cues from something made in the past, as well as the future. The drums hit hard, and when combined with the synth keys, strings and the occasional electric guitar, they make for an oddly enjoyable mix." The Kansas City Star gave the EP a positive review.

== Commercial performance ==
Metropolis: Suite I had minor success in the United States where it peaked at number 115 on the US Billboard 200 chart and fared much better on the R&B/Hip-Hop Albums chart at number 20. The album also charted on the Top Heatseekers chart at number two. The EP spent one week on the Billboard 200, but spent 9 weeks altogether on both the R&B/Hip-Hop Albums chart and the Top Heatseekers chart.

== Track listing ==
Suite I
No.	Title	Writer(s)	Length
1.	"The March of the Wolfmasters"	Charles Joseph II (Chuck Lightning), Nathaniel Irvin III (Nate Rocket Wonder)	1:27
2.	"Violet Stars Happy Hunting!!!" (featuring The Skunks)	Janelle Monáe Robinson, Joseph II, Irvin III	3:13
3.	"Many Moons"	Robinson, Joseph II, Irvin III	5:34
4.	"Cybertronic Purgatory"	Robinson, Joseph II, Irvin III	1:40
5.	"Sincerely, Jane."	Robinson, Joseph II, Irvin III	5:36
Total length:			17:30

Special edition
No.	Title	Writer(s)	Length
6.	"Mr. President"	Robinson, Joseph II, Irvin III	4:59
7.	"Smile"	Charlie Chaplin, Geoffrey Parsons, John Turner	3:58
Total length:			26:10

Vinyl hidden bonus track
No.	Title	Writer(s)	Length
8.	"Violet Stars Happy Hunting!!!" (Cyber-Hop Mix)	Janelle Monáe Robinson, Joseph II, Irvin III	3:12
Total length:			29:22

Fantastic edition
No.	Title	Length
8.	"Violet Stars Happy Hunting!!!" (The Jetson's Mix)	3:10
9.	"Violet Stars Happy Hunting!!!" (live from The Blender Theater) (video)	3:30
10.	"Sincerely, Jane." (live from The Blender Theater) (video)	4:56
11.	"Many Moons" (extended version) (video)	6:24
Total length:		44:10

== Personnel ==
Credits for Metropolis: Suite I (The Chase) adapted from AllMusic.

- Terrence Brown – piano, strings
- Control_z – engineer, drum programming, mastering, mixing
- Cutmaster Swift – scratching, cut
- Brian Davis – graphic design, concept, layout design, creation
- Provi Fulp – concept, stylist, creation
- Bernie Grundman – mastering
- Jaspects – horn section, trumpet, alto sax, tenor sax
- Chuck Lightning – concept, story, creation
- Lord Of The Cybersoul Patrol – executive production
- Lord Mitchell A. "MitchOW!ski" Martian – mastering, mixing, concept, assistant, creation
- Janelle Monáe – hammond organ, vocals, background vocals, production, executive production, concept, soloist, creation, voiceover
- Emily "Widget" Parker – concept, creation
- Kellindo Parker – concept, creation
- Kellis Jr. Parker – guitar, soloist
- Antwan "Big Boi" Patton – executive production
- Donna Permell – photography, concept, creation
- George "Rico" Rodriguez – concept, creation
- Ben Rose – photography, concept, creation
- Skunks – snaps
- Chris Stanford – photography, concept, creation
- Delvin Stanklin – concept, creation
- Sweetfish – bass
- Wolfmaster Lightning – arranger, vocals, production, associate production, associate arranger
- Wolfmaster Z – organ, synthesizer, guitar, piano, arranger, keyboards, electric piano, programming, vocals, production, artwork, graphic design, mastering, mixing, concept, layout design, instrumentation, creation
- Wolfmasters – executive production
- Wondaland Arts Society – creative director, concept, creation

== Charts ==
Chart (2008)	Peak position
US Billboard 200	115
US Top R&B/Hip-Hop Albums (Billboard)	20
US Top Heatseekers (Billboard)	2
