= Harvard College Women's Center =

The Harvard College Women's Center was established in September 2006 as a division of the Office of Student Life. The mission of the HCWC is to promote gender equity by raising awareness of women’s and gender issues, developing women’s leadership, and celebrating women who challenge, motivate, and inspire. In alignment with these goals, it centralizes resources and offers student-focused programming to strengthen individuals and student organizations. The Women’s Center is committed to creating a welcoming and inclusive environment for all genders that encourages dialogue and diversity.

It is located in Harvard Yard's Canaday Hall, B basement and is open to all Harvard undergraduates, regardless of gender.

== Programming ==
The HCWC is run by two full-time staff members and a cohort of undergraduate and graduate interns. Interns work together to produce diverse events that uphold the center's mission and serve the undergraduate student body. Some of these events have included:

- “Fair Game? Media Portrayals of Women in Politics” a discussion led by political journalist Susan Milligan
- “How to Run for the Undergraduate Council” an election workshop designed to get more women candidates to run for Harvard's student undergraduate council
- “Pixel Perfect? (Re)Drawing the Lines of Beauty” an interactive discussion on the alternation of women's images in the media
- “Teach Me How To…” a dance workshop focusing on gender dynamics at parties

The Women's Center also serves the undergraduate body through its support of the Radcliffe Mentor Program,

- The Radcliffe Mentor Program was established in 1985, largely thanks to the work of Cynthia Piltch ’74 as well as the work of other Radcliffe classes. The Program matches current undergraduates (regardless of gender) to Harvard/Radcliffe alumnae for career development, personal growth, and support. Students and alumnae are matched in the fall through an application process.
- The WISTEM Mentor Program connects undergraduate women in science, technology, engineering, and mathematics community with similarly interested graduate students. WISTEM's goal is to help retain women in STEM fields and increase the number of women STEM concentrators at Harvard.
- Ann Radcliffe Trust/Women's Center Community Fund is one of the major ways that the Women's Center supports undergraduate students who wish to implement independent programming that upholds the Women's Center mission. Previous grants have been awarded to the inaugural Sex Week at Harvard, the 2011 Division II National Champions Radcliffe Rugby team, and the annual Women's Leadership Conference.

== Women's Leadership Award ==
The Harvard College Women's Leadership Award honors a senior (of any gender) who demonstrated exceptional leadership and who has made a meaningful impact on fellow students, the campus, and/or the community. Along with honoring a senior at Harvard College, the ceremony also presents a professional who has benefited women with the Harvard College Women's Professional Achievement Award. It is given to a woman who has demonstrated exceptional leadership and distinguished herself in her profession, in public service, or in the arts. The Harvard College Women's Center directs the application process, although a separate selection committee makes the final decision. The Women's Leadership Award is made possible by an endowment given by Terrie Fried Bloom ’75.

== Women's Leadership Award Winners ==
- 2012: Naseemah Mohamed
- 2011: Madeleine Ballard
- 2010: Eva Lam
- 2009: Sarah Lockridge-Steckel
- 2008: Katherine Beck
- 2007: Tracey Nowski
- 2006: Lauren Scuker
- 2005: Lia Larson
- 2004: Lindsay Hyde
- 2003: Braxton Brooks
- 2002: Laura Clancy, '02-'03
- 2001: Peggy Lim
- 2000: Sameera Fazili
- 1999: Sarah Russell

== Women's Professional Achievement Award ==
- 2012: Rebecca Eaton
- 2011: Tina Tchen '78
- 2010: Anne Garrels, '72
- 2009: Stephanie Wilson
- 2008: Diane Paulus
- 2007: Drew Gilpin Faust
- 2006: Joann Manson
- 2005: Carla Harris, '84
- 2004: Hanna Gray, '57
- 2003: Jane Swift
- 2002: Ellen Goodman, '63
- 2001: Doris Kearns Goodwin
- 2000: Carole Simpson
- 1999: Pat Schroeder
