= Janelle Monáe =

American musician and actor (born 1985)

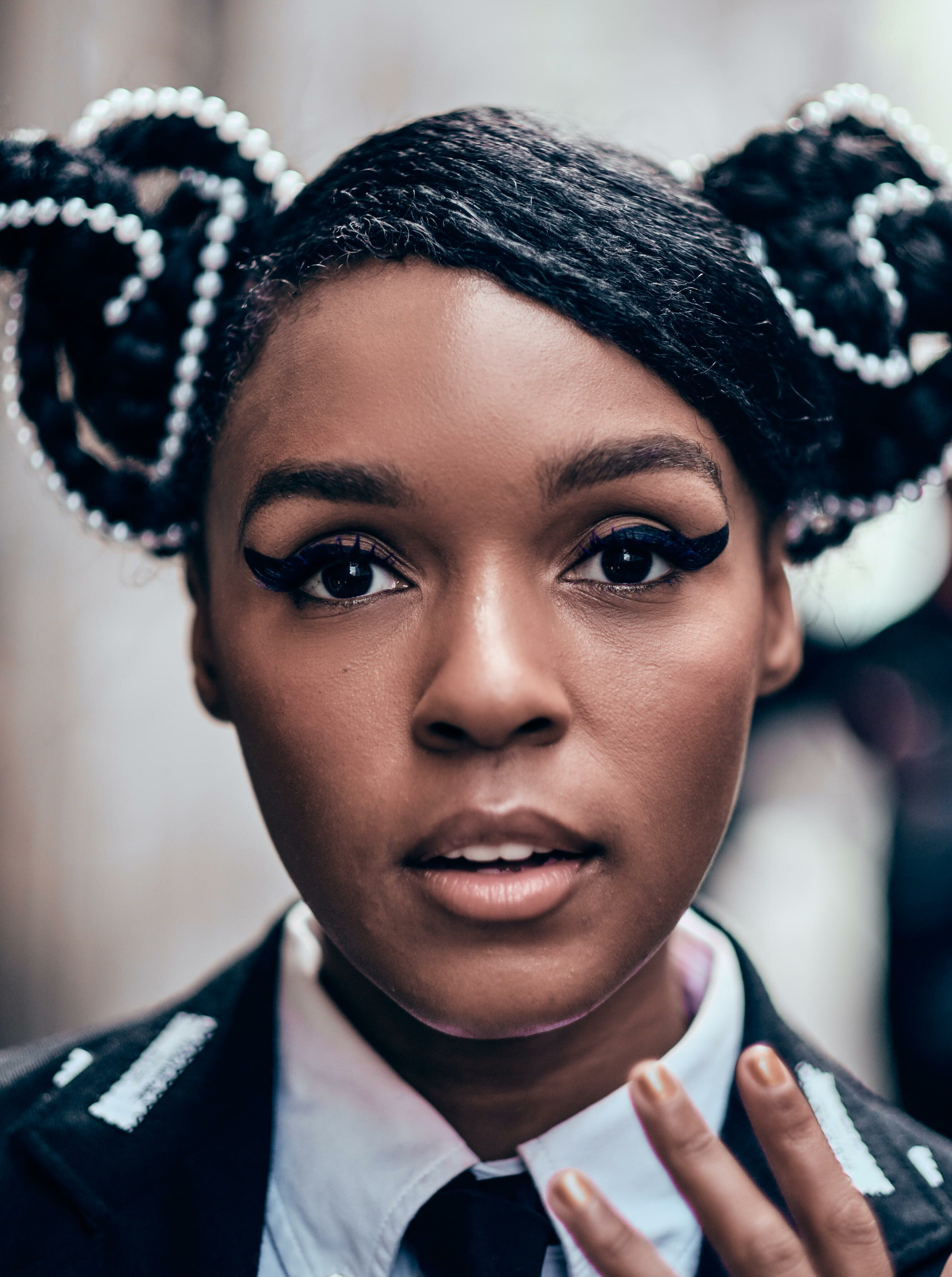
- Monáe at the 2019 Paris Fashion Week
- Born: Janelle Monáe Robinson; December 1, 1985 (age 40); Kansas City, Kansas, U.S.
- Other name: Cindi Mayweather
- Occupations: Singer; songwriter; rapper; actress
- Years active: 2003–present
- Organization: The Wondaland Arts Society
- Works: Discography; filmography
- Awards: Full list
- Musical career
- Origin: Atlanta, Georgia, U.S.
- Genres: R&B; pop; funk; psychedelic soul; hip-hop; progressive soul
- Works: Janelle Monáe discography
- Labels: Wondaland; Epic; Bad Boy; Atlantic
- Formerly of: Purple Ribbon All-Stars
- Website: jmonae.com

Janelle Monáe Robinson (/dʒəˈnɛl moʊˈneɪ/ jə-NEL moh-NAY; born December 1, 1985) is an American singer, songwriter, rapper and actress. She (Note: Monáe uses she/her and they/them pronouns. This article uses she/her for consistency.) has received ten Grammy Award nominations, and is the recipient of a Screen Actors Guild Award and a Children's and Family Emmy Award. Monáe has also been honored with the ASCAP Vanguard Award; as well as the Rising Star Award (2015) and the Trailblazer of the Year Award (2018) from Billboard Women in Music.

Monáe began her musical career in 2003 with the release of her demo album, The Audition. She signed with Bad Boy Records to release her debut extended play (EP), Metropolis: Suite I (The Chase) (2007). It received critical acclaim and narrowly entered the Billboard 200. She signed a joint venture with Atlantic Records to release her debut studio album, The ArchAndroid (2010), which peaked at number 17 on the chart. The following year, she guest performed on fun.'s 2011 single "We Are Young," which received diamond certification by the Recording Industry Association of America (RIAA) and peaked atop the Billboard Hot 100. Monáe's second studio album, The Electric Lady (2013), debuted at number five on the Billboard 200.

Monáe's third studio album, Dirty Computer (2018)—also a concept album—was released to widespread critical acclaim; it was named best album of the year by several publications. The album peaked within the top ten of the Billboard 200, and was accompanied by both Monae's Dirty Computer Tour and the science fiction film of the same name. In 2022, she wrote the cyberpunk story collection, The Memory Librarian: And Other Stories of Dirty Computer, based on the album. Her fourth studio album, The Age of Pleasure (2023) was nominated for Album of the Year at the 66th Annual Grammy Awards, becoming her second nomination in the category as a lead artist.

Monáe has also ventured into acting, first gaining attention for starring in the 2016 films Moonlight and Hidden Figures. For portraying engineer Mary Jackson in the latter, she was nominated for the Critics' Choice Movie Award for Best Supporting Actress. She has since starred in the films Harriet (2019) and Glass Onion (2022), and the television series Homecoming (2020). For her performance in Glass Onion, Monáe won the National Board of Review Award for Best Supporting Actress. In 2022, she won a Children's and Family Emmy Award for Outstanding Short Form Program for her role in the TV series We the People. She launched her record label, Wondaland Arts Society in a joint venture with Epic Records in 2015, and has signed artists including Jidenna, Roman GianArthur and St. Beauty. In 2019 she inducted Janet Jackson into the Rock and Roll Hall of Fame.

== Early life ==
There was a lot of confusion and nonsense where I grew up, so I reacted by creating my own little world. [...] I began to see how music could change lives, and I began to dream about a world where every day was like anime and Broadway, where music fell from the sky and anything could happen.

— Monáe, on her childhood musical inspiration

Janelle Monáe Robinson was born on December 1, 1985, in Kansas City, Kansas, and was raised in Quindaro, a working-class community of Kansas City. Her mother, Janet, worked as a janitor and a hotel maid. Her father, Michael Robinson Summers, was a truck driver. Monáe's parents separated when Monáe was a toddler and her mother later married a postal worker. Monáe has a younger sister, Kimmy, from her mother's remarriage.

Monáe was raised Baptist and learned to sing at a local church. Her family members were musicians and performers at the local African Methodist Episcopal church, the Baptist church, and the Church of God in Christ. Monáe dreamed of being a singer and a performer from a very young age, and has cited the fictional character of Dorothy Gale from The Wizard of Oz as a musical influence. The Miseducation of Lauryn Hill, which Monáe bought two copies of with her first check, was another source of inspiration. She performed songs from the album on Juneteenth talent shows, winning three years in a row.

As a teenager, Monáe was enrolled in the Coterie Theater's Young Playwrights' Round Table, which began writing musicals. One musical, completed when she was around the age of 12, was inspired by the 1979 Stevie Wonder album Journey Through "The Secret Life of Plants".

Monáe attended F. L. Schlagle High School, and after high school, moved to New York City to study musical theater at the American Musical and Dramatic Academy, where she was the only black woman in her class. Monáe enjoyed the experience, but feared that she might lose her edge and "sound, or look or feel like anybody else". In a 2010 interview Monáe explained, "I felt like that was a home but I wanted to write my own musicals. I didn't want to have to live vicariously through a character that had been played thousands of times – in a line with everybody wanting to play the same person."

After a year and a half, Monáe dropped out of the academy and relocated to Atlanta, enrolling at Georgia Perimeter College. She began writing her own music and performing around the campus. In 2003, Monáe self-released a demo album titled The Audition, which she sold out of the trunk of a Mitsubishi Galant. During this period she worked at an Office Depot but was fired for answering a fan's e-mail using a company computer, an incident that inspired the song "Lettin' Go", which in turn attracted the attention of Big Boi.

== Career ==
=== Career beginnings (2005) ===
Monáe appeared on the Purple Ribbon All-Stars album Got Purp? Vol. 2 as well as on Outkast's 2006 album Idlewild, where she was featured on the songs "Call the Law" and "In Your Dreams". Big Boi told his friend Sean Combs about Monáe, of whom at the time Combs had not yet heard. Combs soon visited Monáe's MySpace page and according to a HitQuarters interview with Bad Boy Records A&R person Daniel 'Skid' Mitchell, Combs loved it right away: "[He] loved her look, loved that you couldn't see her body, loved the way she was dancing, and just loved the vibe. He felt like she has something that was different – something new and fresh."

Monáe signed to the label, Bad Boy, in 2006. The label's chief role was to facilitate her exposure on a much broader scale rather than develop the artist and her music, as Mitchell noted: "She was already moving, she already had her records – she had a self-contained movement." Combs and Big Boi wanted to take their time and build her profile organically and allow the music to grow rather than put out "a hot single which everyone jumps on, and then they fade because it's just something of the moment".

=== Metropolis and The ArchAndroid (2007–2011) ===
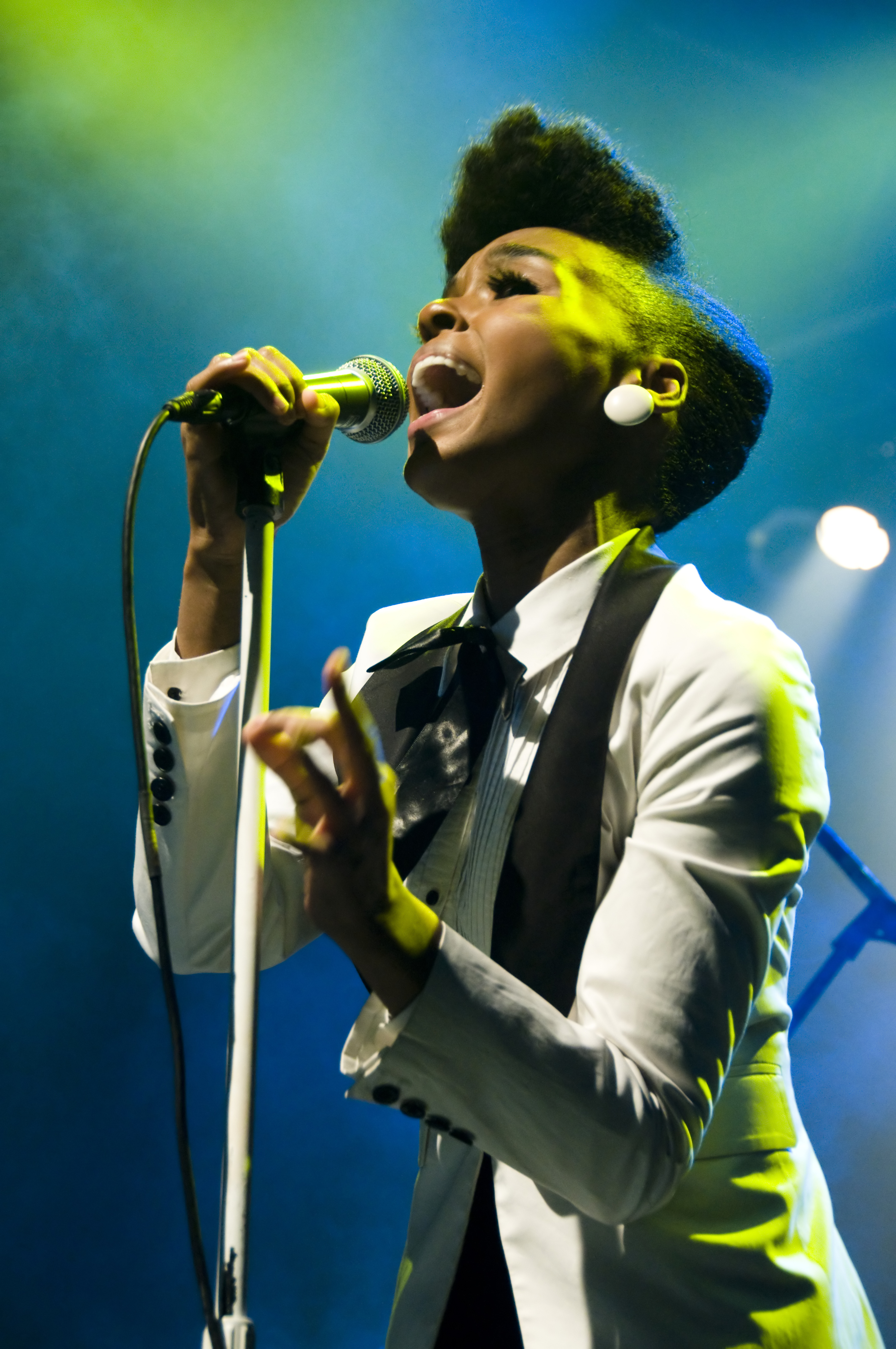
Monáe performing at the Austin Music Hall in 2009

In 2007, Monáe released her first solo work, Metropolis. It was originally conceived as a concept album in four parts, or "suites", which were to be released through her website and mp3 download sites. After the release of the first part of the series, Metropolis: Suite I (The Chase) in mid-2007, these plans were altered following signing with Sean Combs's label, Bad Boy Records, later in the year. The label gave an official and physical release to the first suite in August 2008, which was retitled Metropolis: The Chase Suite (Special Edition) and included two new tracks. The EP was critically acclaimed, garnering Monáe a 51st Annual Grammy Awards Grammy nomination for Best Urban/Alternative Performance for the single "Many Moons", festival appearances and opening slots for indie pop band of Montreal. Monáe also toured as the opening act for band No Doubt on their summer 2009 tour. Her single "Open Happiness" was featured in the 2009 season finale of American Idol. Monáe told MTV about the concept for her new album and also discussed an alter ego named Cindi Mayweather. She said:

Cindy is an android and I love speaking about the android because they are the new "other". People are afraid of the other and I believe we're going to live in a world with androids because of technology and the way it advances. The first album she was running because she had fallen in love with a human and she was being disassembled for that.

In a November 2009 interview, Monáe revealed the title and concept behind her album, The ArchAndroid. The album was released on May 18, 2010. The second and third suites of Metropolis are combined into this full-length release, in which Monáe's alter ego, Cindi Mayweather – also the protagonist of Metropolis: The Chase Suite – becomes a messianic figure to the android community of Metropolis. Monáe announced plans to shoot a video for each song on The ArchAndroid and create a film, graphic novel and a touring Broadway musical based on the album. The Metropolis concept series draws inspiration from a wide range of musical, cinematic and other sources, ranging from Alfred Hitchcock to Debussy to Philip K. Dick. The series puts Fritz Lang's 1927 silent film Metropolis, which Monáe referred to as "the godfather of science-fiction movies", in special regard. Aside from sharing a name, they also share visual styles (the cover for The ArchAndroid is inspired by the iconic poster for Metropolis), conceptual themes and political goals, using expressionistic future scenarios to examine and explore contemporary ideas of prejudice and class. Both also include a performing female android, though to very different effect. Where Metropolis android Maria is the evil, havoc-sowing double of the messianic figure to the city's strictly segregated working class, Monáe's messianic android muse Cindi Mayweather represents an interpretation of androids as that segregated minority, which Monáe describes as "... the Other. And I feel like all of us, whether in the majority or the minority, felt like the Other at some point."

Monáe received the Vanguard Award from the American Society of Composers, Authors and Publishers at the Rhythm & Soul Music Awards in 2010. Monáe covered Charlie Chaplin's Smile on Billboard.com in June 2010. In an NPR interview in September 2010, Monáe said she is a believer in, and a proponent of, time travel. Monáe performed "Tightrope" during the second elimination episode of the 11th Season of Dancing with the Stars on September 28, 2010. Monáe performed at the 53rd Annual Grammy Awards in 2011 alongside artists Bruno Mars and B.o.B; they performed the synth section of B.o.B's song "Nothin' on You" and she then performed the track "Cold War" with B.o.B on the guitar and Mars on the drums. The performance received a standing ovation. Monáe's single "Tightrope" was also featured on the American Idols LIVE! Tour 2011, performed by Pia Toscano, Haley Reinhart, Naima Adedapo, and Thia Megia.

In September 2011, Monáe was featured as a guest vocalist on fun.'s single, "We Are Young", which achieved major commercial success, topping the charts of more than ten countries and selling over ten million units worldwide. The song garnered Monáe three Grammy nominations at the 55th Annual Grammy Awards, including Record of the Year. Nate Ruess, the lead singer of fun., performed an acoustic version of "We Are Young" with Monáe. On December 11, 2011, Monáe performed at the Nobel Peace Prize concert in Oslo, Norway, including her songs 'Cold War', 'Tightrope', and a cover of the Jackson 5's 'I Want You Back'.

=== The Electric Lady and other projects (2012–2014) ===
Monáe was also featured on "Do My Thing" for Estelle's studio album, All of Me. In June 2012, Monáe performed two new songs, "Electric Lady" and "Dorothy Dandridge Eyes" – from her then-upcoming sophomore studio album, The Electric Lady – at the Toronto Jazz Festival. In July 2012, for the second year in a row, Monáe appeared at the North Sea Jazz Festival in Europe as well as in the 46th edition of the Montreux Jazz Festival in Switzerland on the 14th.

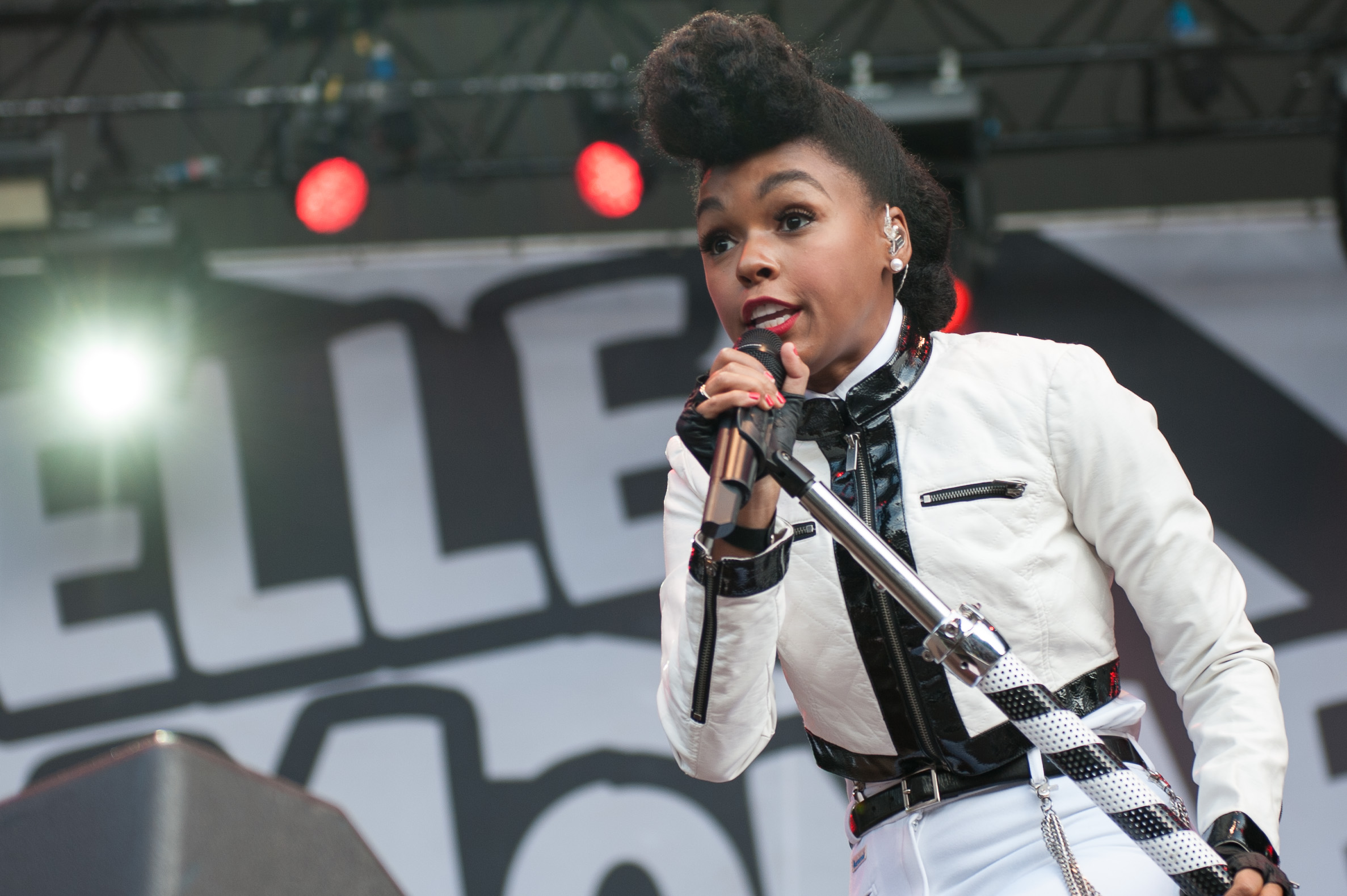
Monáe performing at Way Out West in Gothenburg, Sweden, on August 8, 2014

In August 2012, Monáe was chosen as CoverGirl's newest spokesperson. In September 2012, Monáe performed at CarolinaFest in support of President Obama, just before the 2012 Democratic National Convention in Charlotte, North Carolina. In October 2012, Monáe starred in a commercial for the Sonos Wireless HiFi home audio system, and appeared in a Sonos commercial in 2012 with Deep Cotton. The Boston City Council named October 16, 2013, "Janelle Monáe Day" in the city of Boston, Massachusetts, in recognition of her artistry and social leadership.

Monáe's first single from The Electric Lady, "Q.U.E.E.N.", featuring Erykah Badu, premiered on SoundCloud and made available for download purchase at the iTunes Store on April 23, 2013. "Q.U.E.E.N." garnered 31,000 digital sales according to Nielsen Soundscan with the accompanying music video gaining four million YouTube views within its first week of release. In her 2013 interview with fuse, Monáe said "Q.U.E.E.N." was inspired by conversations she shared with Erykah Badu about the treatment of marginalized people, especially African-American women, and the title is an acronym "for those who are marginalized"; Q standing for the queer community, U standing for the "untouchables", the first E standing for "emigrants", the latter standing for "excommunicated" and N standing for "negroid". Thematically, The Electric Lady continues the utopian cyborg concepts of its predecessors, while presenting itself in more plainspoken, introspective territory in addition to experimenting with genres beyond conventional funk and soul such as jazz ("Dorothy Dandridge Eyes"), pop-punk ("Dance Apocalyptic"), gospel ("Victory") and woozy, sensual vocal ballads ("PrimeTime", featuring Miguel). The album features guest appearances by Prince, Solange Knowles, aforementioned Miguel and Esperanza Spalding with production from previous collaborator Deep Cotton (a psychedelic punk act) and Roman GianArthur (a soul music composer), and was released to critical acclaim on September 10, 2013.

On September 14, 2013, Monáe performed along with Chic at the iTunes Festival in London. On September 28, Monáe performed at the Global Citizens Festival in Central Park alongside Stevie Wonder. Monáe performed as the featured musical guest on Saturday Night Live October 26 with host Edward Norton.

Monáe's voice is heard as veterinarian Dr. Monáe in the movie Rio 2, released in the U.S. on April 11, 2014, and the song "What Is Love" was featured on the soundtrack. In April 2014, Monáe was invited to perform along with Tessanne Chin, Patti LaBelle, Aretha Franklin, Jill Scott, Ariana Grande, and Melissa Etheridge at the White House as a part of the PBS-broadcast "Women of Soul" event, which celebrated American women artists whose work has left an indelible and profound impact on American national musical culture. She performed "Goldfinger", "Tightrope", and joined in on the all-inclusive performance of "Proud Mary".

On April 14, 2014, Monáe was the recipient of the inaugural Harvard College Women's Center Award for Achievement in Arts and Media for achievements as an artist, advocate and feminist. She tweeted earlier that day, "Headed to #Harvard to meet the beautiful ladies in the Women's Center. Can't believe I'm the honoree today. Just So thankful." Monáe was also recognized as the 2014 Woman of the Year by the Harvard College Black Men's Forum at their annual Celebration of Black Women gala.

In mid-2014, Monáe had an interview with Fuse where she teased a follow-up to The Electric Lady, saying "I'm working on a new, cool creative project called 'Eephus'" and "It's a big concept and you're not going to see it coming. It'll just land." Later in 2014, Monáe was featured on Sérgio Mendes' album, Magic. She sings on the track titled "Visions of You".

=== The Eephus, Moonlight, and Hidden Figures (2015–2016) ===
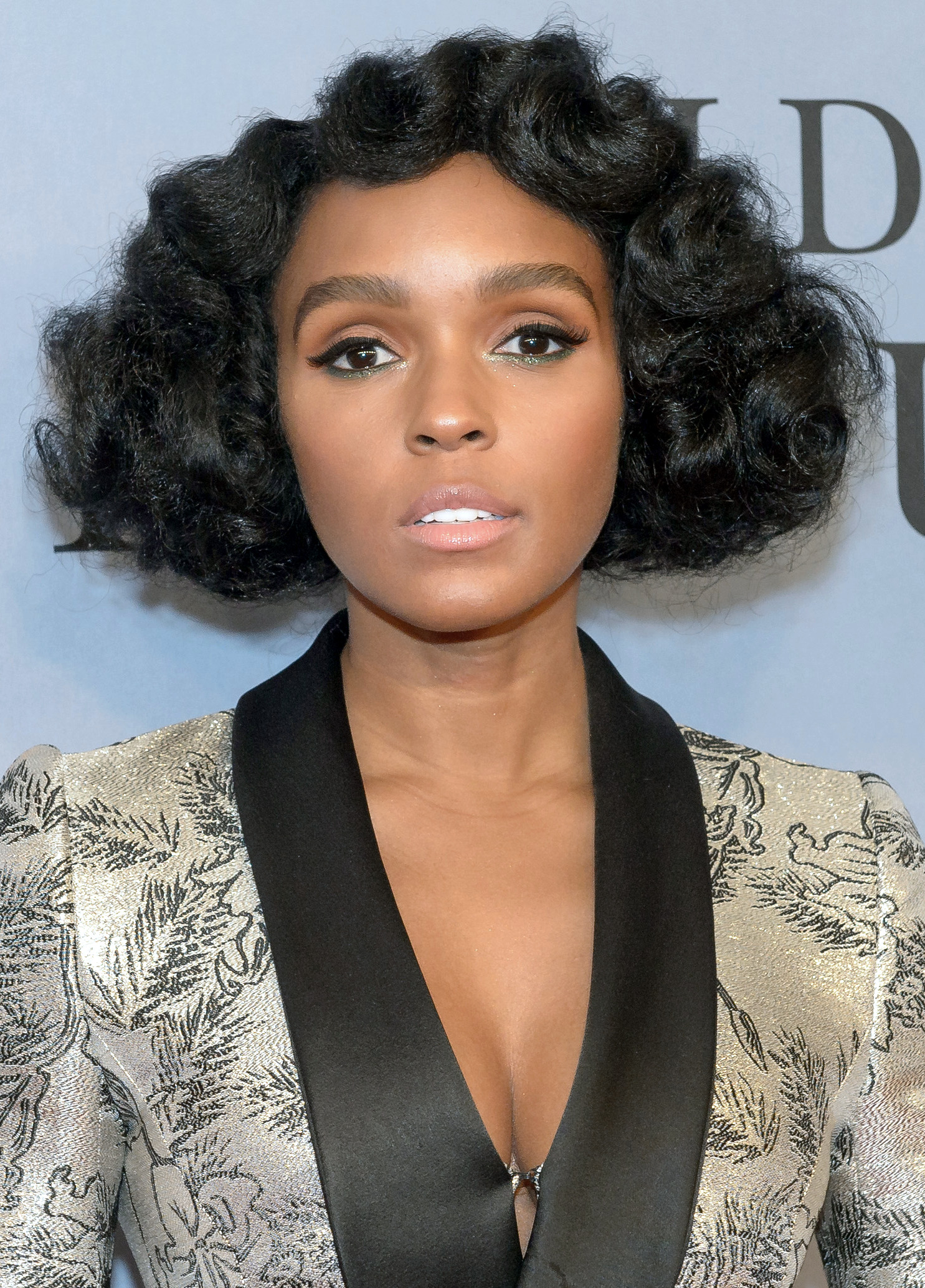
Monáe at the premiere of Moonlight in 2016

In February 2015, Monáe along with Epic Records and its CEO and chairman L.A. Reid announced that Monáe's independent label Wondaland Arts Society had signed a "landmark joint venture partnership" to revamp the label, now known as Wondaland Records, and to promote the artists on the label. Jem Aswad of Billboard called Monáe a "mini-mogul" because of the deal and revealed that "the partnership will bow in May with a 5-song compilation EP called The Eephus, including tracks from rapper Jidenna [...], Roman, St. Beauty, Deep Cotton and Monáe herself."

In late March 2015, Monáe released the single "Yoga" from the album The Eephus. The album debuted at number 22 of the Billboard 200 and at number 5 of the top R&B/Hip-Hop Albums with an equivalent album sales of 47,000 units.

In mid-2015 Monáe attended various fashion events including London Fashion Week and the 2015 Met Gala. She began collaborating with Nile Rodgers for a new Chic album and Duran Duran for the album Paper Gods, their first album in over five years, and their single called "Pressure Off".

On August 14, 2015, Monáe and the body of her Atlanta-based Wondaland Arts Society collective performed the protest song "Hell You Talmbout", which raised awareness of the many black lives that were taken as a result of police brutality, with lyrics such as "Walter Scott, say his name. Jerame Reid, say his name. Philip White, say his name ... Eric Garner, say his name. Trayvon Martin, say his name ... Sandra Bland, say her name. Sharondra Singleton, say her name." She also gave a speech about police brutality after the performance on NBC's Today Show, "Yes Lord! God bless America! God bless all the lost lives to police brutality. We want white America to know that we stand tall today. We want black America to know we stand tall today. We will not be silenced ..."

By March 15, 2016, First Lady Michelle Obama proclaimed that she had assembled a collaborative track featuring vocals from Monáe, Kelly Clarkson, Zendaya and Missy Elliott, alongside production credit from pop songwriter Diane Warren and Elliott, titled "This Is for My Girls". The iTunes-exclusive record was used to both coincide with Obama's Texan SXSW speech and to promote the First Lady's third-world educational initiative Let Girls Learn.

In October 2016, Monáe made her big screen acting debut in the critically acclaimed film Moonlight, alongside Naomie Harris, André Holland, and Mahershala Ali. Monáe also starred in the film Hidden Figures, alongside actors Taraji P. Henson and Octavia Spencer; the film was released in December 2016.

=== Dirty Computer and other projects (2017–2022) ===
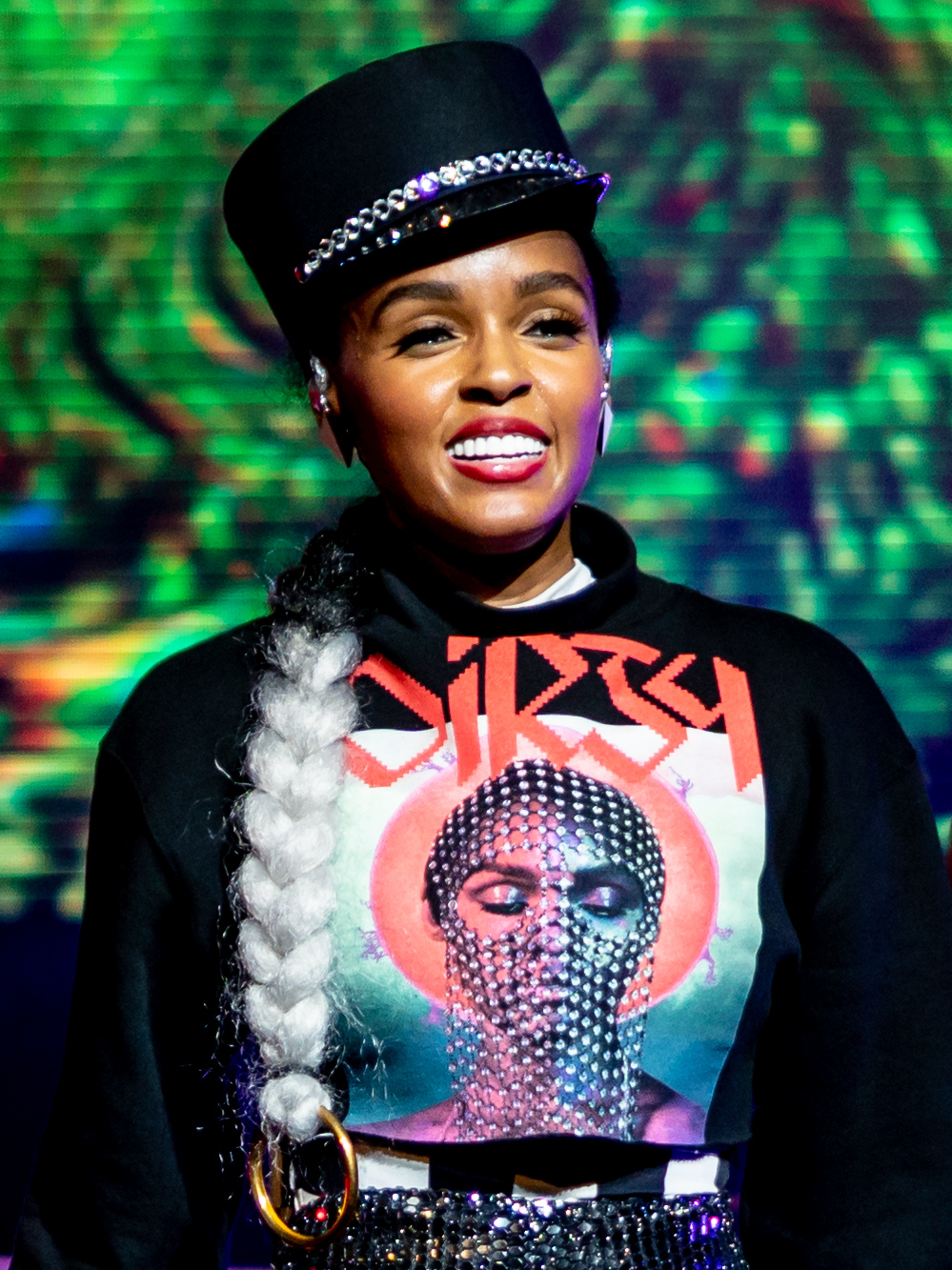
Janelle Monáe performing at the Dirty Computer Tour

While filming these two movie roles, Monáe remained active in music with features on Grimes' "Venus Fly" from her Art Angels album and also the soundtrack for the Netflix series The Get Down with a song titled, "Hum Along and Dance (Gotta Get Down)". Monáe was also on the tracks "Isn't This the World" and "Jalapeño" for the Hidden Figures soundtrack.

In an interview with People, Monáe revealed that she was already working on her third studio album when she received the scripts for her two first acting roles; therefore, she put the album on hold. Monáe also revealed in the interview that she would be releasing new music sometime in 2017, although by the end of the year no album or single was announced. On February 16, 2018, Monáe revealed her third studio album, titled Dirty Computer, through a teaser video on YouTube. The album was accompanied by a narrative film project, and the teaser video aired nationwide in select theaters prior to screenings of Black Panther. She held a series of "top-secret" listening sessions in Los Angeles and New York in support of the album. On February 22, 2018, Monáe released "Make Me Feel" and "Django Jane" as the first two singles from Dirty Computer, both accompanied by music videos and announced that the album would follow on April 27, 2018. Monáe stated in an interview with BBC Radio 1: "Prince was actually working on the album with me before he passed on to another frequency, and helped me come up with some sounds. And I really miss him, you know, it's hard for me to talk about him. But I do miss him, and his spirit will never leave me." Its short film earned a Hugo Award nomination for Best Dramatic Presentation – Short Form.

Monáe appeared in the episode "Autofac" of the 2017 anthology series based on the work of Philip K. Dick, Electric Dreams, which premiered on Channel 4 in the UK and on Amazon Video in the US.

On April 27, 2018, Monáe released a sci-fi film companion "emotion picture" to her new record Dirty Computer. The album debuted at the number six of the Billboard 200 with 54,000 equivalent units and on the top ten charts of Canada, United Kingdom and Ireland. It was chosen as the best album of the year by three publications: the Associated Press, New York Times, and NPR. The album received the nomination for Album of the Year at the 61st Annual Grammy Awards. She also contributed to the soundtrack to the dark comedy film Sorry to Bother You, collaborating with The Coup. In 2018 her Wondaland Pictures production company was signed to a first look deal with Universal.

On November 15, 2018, it was announced that Monáe would receive the Trailblazer of the Year award at the 2018 Billboard Women in Music event, which was held on December 6, 2018. Also in 2018, Monáe co-starred in the fantasy drama feature film Welcome to Marwen, by filmmaker and screenwriter Robert Zemeckis alongside Steve Carell and Leslie Mann. On January 3, 2019, the Coachella Valley Music and Arts Festival announced that Monáe will co-headliner the stage with Childish Gambino. Glastonbury Festival also confirmed Monáe's presence as headlining the West Holts stage of the festival. Four days after the Coachella setlist announcement, Monàe released a new music video for the song "Screwed". She replaced Julia Roberts in the second season of the Amazon Prime Video series, Homecoming, playing "a tenacious woman who finds herself floating in a canoe, with no memory of how she got there or who she is." On March 29, 2019, in Brooklyn, NY, she inducted Janet Jackson into the Rock & Roll Hall of Fame. Also in 2019, she co-starred in the film Harriet, about abolitionist Harriet Tubman. Monáe returned to the big screen twice in 2020, with her first lead role in September 2020 with horror film Antebellum, and another supporting role with biopic The Glorias.

On February 9, 2020, Monáe opened the 92nd Academy Awards with a performance featuring Billy Porter that highlighted the many films nominated as well as films that were snubbed by the Academy, including Dolemite Is My Name and Midsommar. In September 2020, Monáe released the music video Turntables as part of the Amazon Studios' bipartisan voter registration campaign. The song is used over the end credits of the Stacey Abrams-backed film, All In: The Fight for Democracy. More recently, she signed global deal with Sony Music Publishing.

On July 4, 2021, We The People, a 10-part series of animated music videos premiered on Netflix, created by Chris Nee, with Kenya Barris as a showrunner and produced by Barack and Michelle Obama. Monáe performed a number of songs for the series. This included a reggae-influenced number, titled "Stronger," which focuses on the "fight for justice and unity ... unity, liberty and equality" and the title track for the series. She won the Children's and Family Emmy Awards for Outstanding Short Form Program as one of the writers.

In 2022, Monáe portrayed twin sisters Helen and Cassandra "Andi" Brand in Glass Onion: A Knives Out Mystery, for which she received critical acclaim. In April 2022, Harper Voyager published her first book, The Memory Librarian: And Other Stories of Dirty Computer, which "explores how different threads of liberation—queerness, race, gender plurality, and love—become tangled with future possibilities of memory and time in such a totalitarian landscape ... and what the costs might be when trying to unravel and weave them into freedoms." In May 2022, Deadline reported Monáe was set to act as Josephine Baker in the TV series De La Resistance.

=== The Age of Pleasure (2023) ===
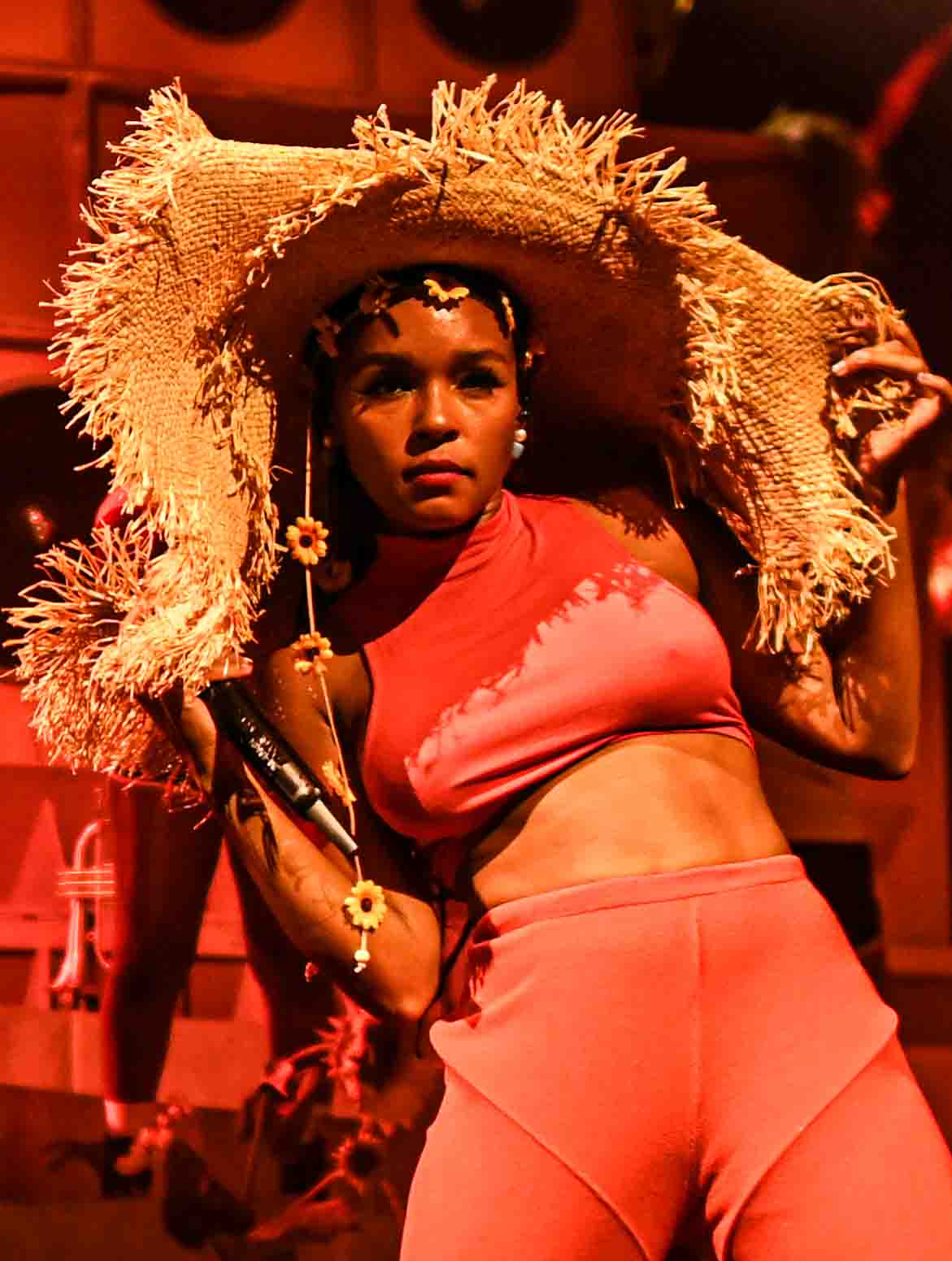
Janelle Monae performing during 'The Age of Pleasure' tour in 2023

In December 2022, Atlantic Records' CEO Craig Kallman said in an interview with Variety that Monáe had new music scheduled for 2023. On February 16, 2023, Monáe released the single "Float" featuring horns by Seun Kuti and his band, Egypt 80. On May 11, she announced her fourth album The Age of Pleasure would be released on June 9.

In a July 2023 interview with The Current, Monáe described her new album as "a movement" and "a soundtrack to a lifestyle" emphasizing the unapologetic pursuit of radical joy. The sensual and summery beats of the songs and accompanying music videos for tracks like "Water Slide" and "Lipstick Lover" continue to build upon depictions of queer love and acceptance common in Monáe's work.

The album was nominated for Album of the Year and Best Progressive R&B Album at the 66th Annual Grammy Awards.

=== Bass X Machina (2026) ===
In September 2026, Brian Tyree Henry revealed that he asked Monáe to write the theme song of Bass X Machina, a steampunk Western Science fiction and supernatural adult animated series. The series theme song is entitled "HONOR KiLLING". She, and two other members of her Wondaland Arts Collective, Roman GianArthur and Nate Wonder, created original music used in the series. Monáe also voices the character Glory in the six-episode limited series.

== Artistry ==
=== Musical styles and influences ===
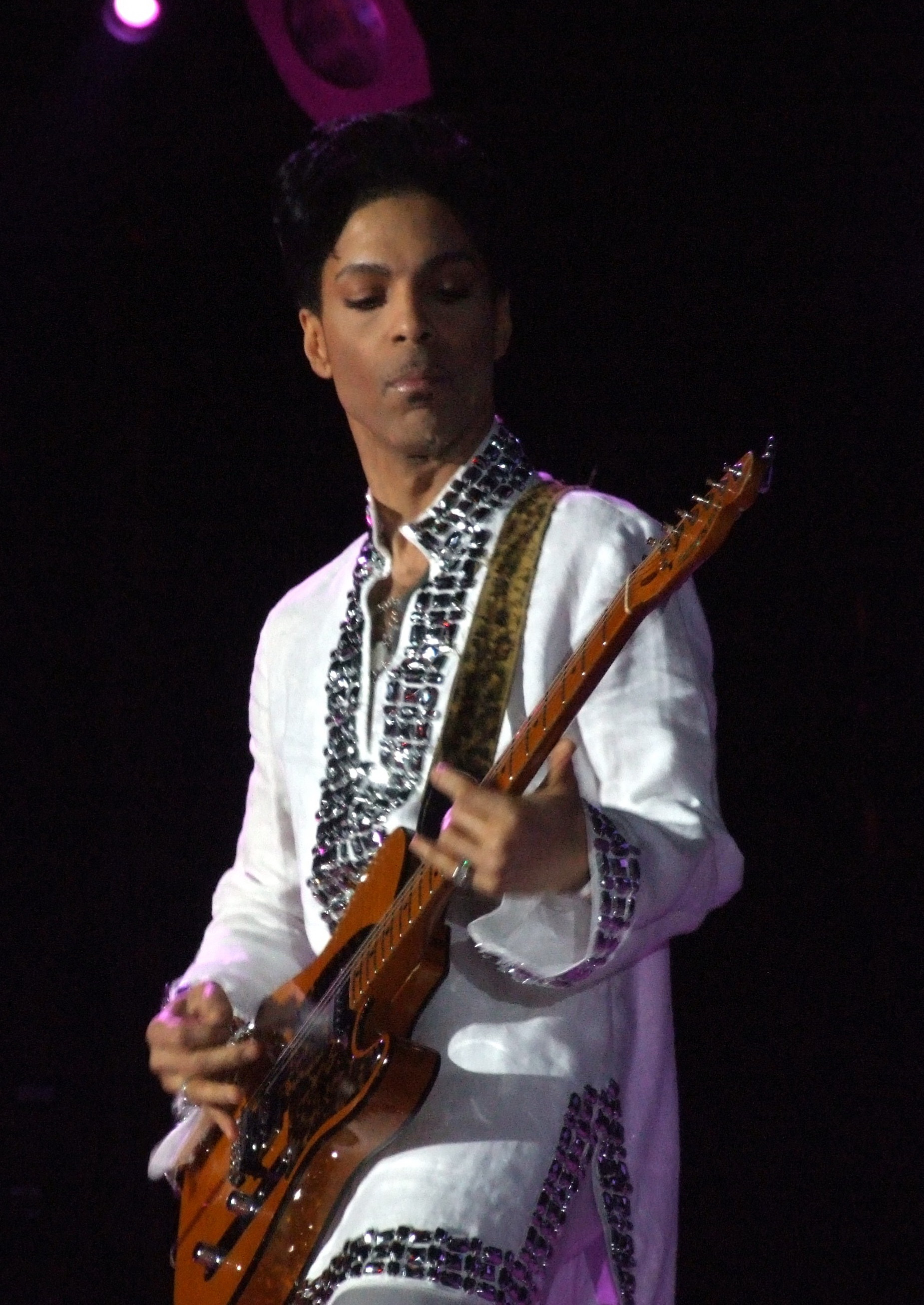
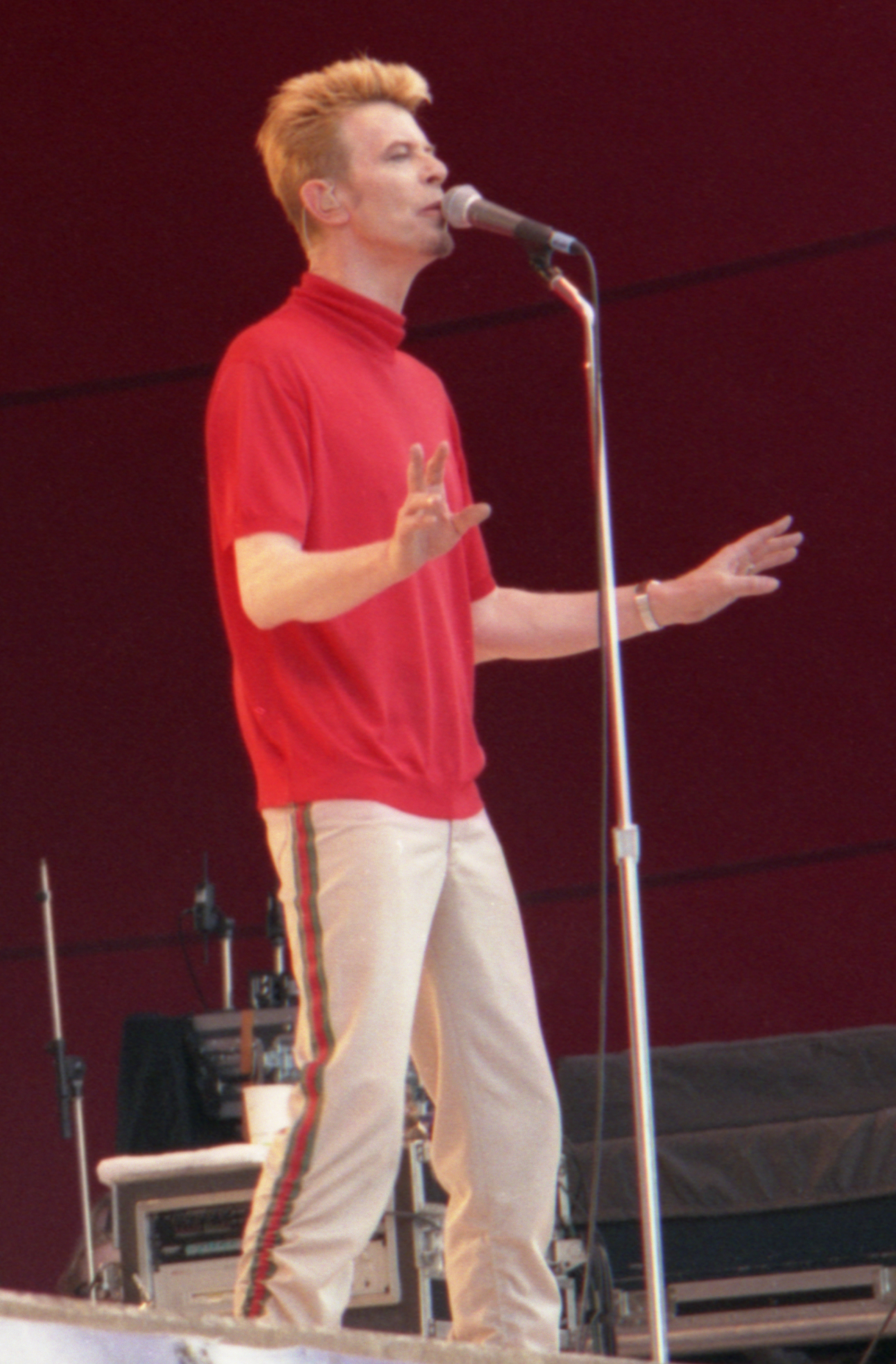
Monáe's music and image has drawn comparisons to Prince (left) and David Bowie (right). She has cited both musicians as major influences.

Monáe has a mezzo-soprano voice. The Telegraph published an interview with Monáe, talking about her first studio album, in which the journalist Bernadette McNulty said, "I begin to worry for a moment that Monáe may not just be a humourless science-fiction nerd, but actually an android herself, created in a laboratory as a super-musical cross between James Brown, Judy Garland, André 3000 and Steve Jobs, invented to test the desperate incredulity of music journalists." She also compared Monáe to artists such as Annie Lennox, Lauryn Hill, and Corinne Bailey Rae. Monáe's musical styles have been described as "a soaring orchestral trip enlivened with blockbuster vocals, mysterious imagery and notes of Sixties pop and jazz". The Guardian has noted some of Monáe's influences as Michael Jackson, Janet Jackson, Prince, Outkast, Erykah Badu, James Brown, Grace Jones, Stevie Wonder, David Bowie, Jimi Hendrix, Bernard Herrmann, Funkadelic and the Incredible String Band. Matthew Valnes likens Monáe's dancing style in the music video for "Tightrope" to that of James Brown. In an opinion piece for The Quietus, John Calvert places Janelle Monáe within the Afrofuturism movement, pointing out her similarities to Sun Ra and George Clinton. He asserts that Janelle Monáe is innovating the genre. Monáe has said she has an alter ego from the year 2719, named Cindi Mayweather.

In her first EP, Monáe gave this alter ego a back story: she was on the run after breaking the law in her home town of Metropolis by falling in love with a human, Anthony Greendown. Monáe has expanded on Cindi's mythos, saying, "The Archandroid, Cindi, is the mediator, between the mind and the hand. She's the mediator between the haves and the have-nots, the oppressed and the oppressor. She's like the Archangel in the Bible, and what Neo represents to The Matrix." In her second album, Cindi Mayweather returned to Earth to liberate Metropolitans from the Great Divide, an oppressive oligarchy that used time travel to "suppress freedom and love". Chris Champion of The Observer described Metropolis and The ArchAndroid as "psychedelic soul with a sci-fi twist". Matthew Valnes describes Monáe as innovating a more contemporary Neo-Afrofuturism, where the android role is used as a tool to critique the representation of Black female musicians in the funk genre. Funk music of 1960s through 1980s is a prevalent music style influencing Monáe. The website for Monáe's Wondaland Arts Society Collective asserts, "We believe there are only three forms of music; good music, bad music, and funk." Monáe has also referred to herself as a "funkstress".

Monáe's roots in Kansas City, Kansas, where she was born and raised, are evident in her lyrics and style. According to Carrie Battan's Pitchfork feature on Monáe, the song "Ghetto Woman" directly addresses Monáe's working-class K.C., Kansas mother – as well as the portrayal of working-class black women in U.S. culture – with the line "Carry on, ghetto woman, even when the news portrays you less than you could be." Monáe also told the London Evening Standard she has internalized her KCK (K.C., KS) roots by wearing the working-class uniform of her parents and expressing concern that she cannot let "her community down". On the album The ArchAndroid, especially in songs like "Cold War" or "BabopbyeYa", Monáe relates "the dystopian cityscapes depicted in Metropolis to the boarded-up projects of poverty-wracked Kansas". Kansas City, therefore, not only represents Monáe's physical roots within her hometown, but also serves as an important influence on the lyrics and science-fictional setting.

=== Public image ===
I feel like I have a responsibility to my community and other young girls to help redefine what it looks like to be a woman. I don't believe in men's wear or women's wear, I just like what I like. And I think we should just be respected for being an individual ... I've been in Vogue, now, and different publications, which is cool, because I think that it just shows a different perspective of how women can dress.

— Monáe, on her image and artistic freedom

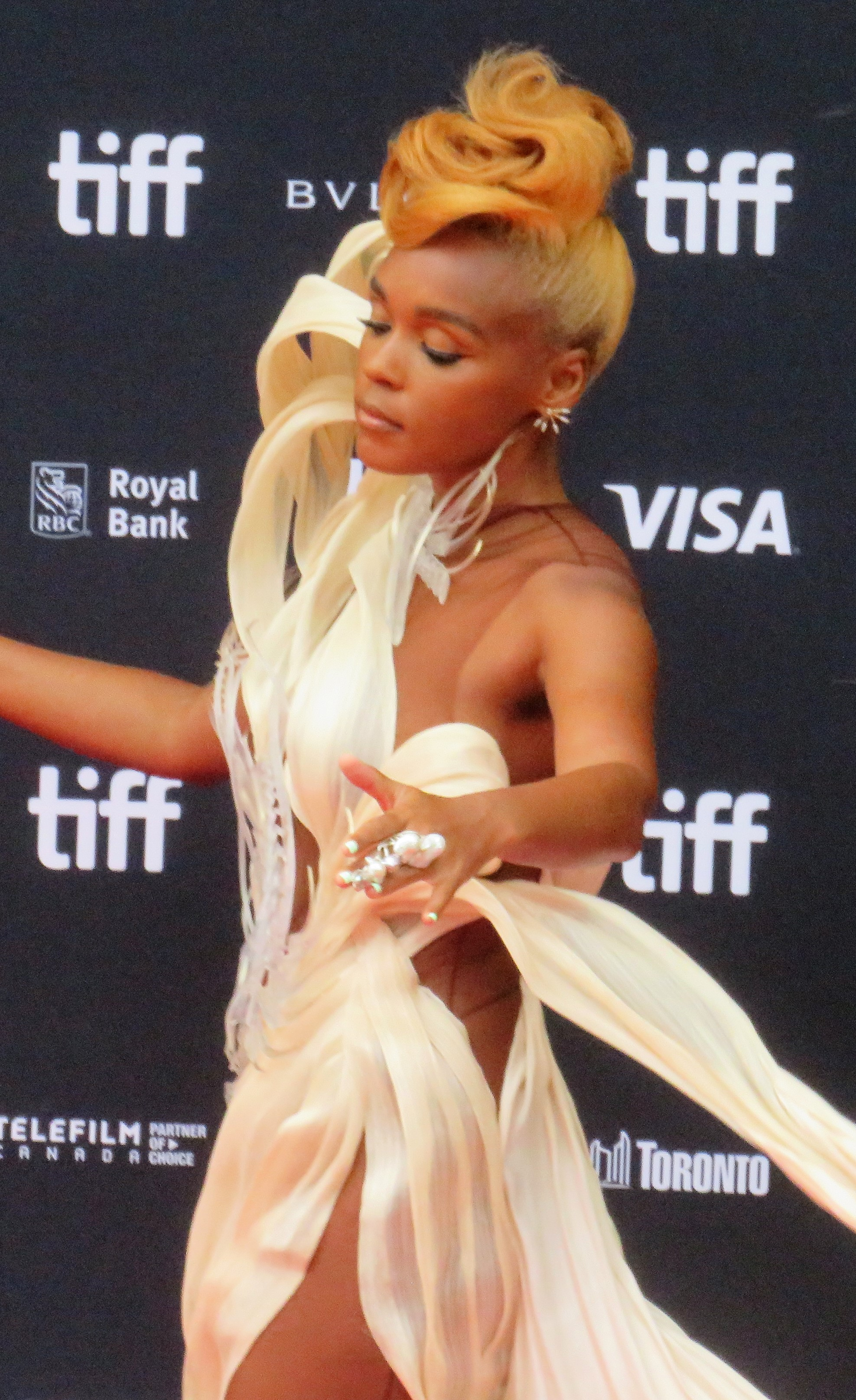
Monáe is known for her eccentric style.

In the 2010s, Monáe's signature style was her tuxedo wardrobe. She said "I bathe in it, I swim in it, and I could be buried in it. A tux is such a standard uniform, it's so classy and it's a lifestyle I enjoy. The tux keeps me balanced. I look at myself as a canvas. I don't want to cloud myself with too many colors or I'll go crazy. It's an experiment I'm doing. I think I want to be in the Guinness Book of World Records." Monáe's signature look harkens back to dandyism. Citing Grace Jones and Josephine Baker as role models, Monáe takes the classical 18th-century look in the classical white and black pattern. Monáe's signature look can also be attributed to the early days in her career, when she was employed as a maid. She mentioned this in her acceptance speech for the "Young, Gifted, and Black" award at the 2012 Black Girls Rock! ceremony. Monáe has been known to distribute the Ten Droid Commandments, which encourages her fans to be individuals. The Telegraph also commented on her image as an artist, saying, "Sitting in a grey, airless record company office, this slight, stiff young woman delivers her speech in slow, deliberate tones, utterly expressionless. Dressed in her trademark starched shirt and tuxedo, hair immaculately coiffed, Monáe's face is an opaque mask of perfection: all silken smooth skin, button nose and glassy brown eyes." Monáe describes tuxedos as a uniform for her career, speaks of wanting to redefine how women dress, and has been featured in the "Style 100" of InStyle magazine. The Council of Fashion Designers of America Awards honored Monáe with the Board of Directors' Tribute and the American Ingenuity Award for her "extraordinary ability to experiment in fashion".

When it comes to her acting career, Monáe expressed desire to shape it around that of Johnny Depp, stating that he has a very vast career: "The amount of roles: Willy Wonka to Sweeney Todd to all of the dramatic roles. Whatever the Janelle Monáe version of that is. Maybe something even better..."

== Personal life ==
During a 2011 interview with London Evening Standard, Monáe said she "only dates androids", a reference to her musical alter ego found in many of her songs. She also said, "I speak about androids because I think the android represents the new 'other'. You can compare it to being a lesbian or being a gay man or being a Black woman ... what I want is for people who feel oppressed or feel like the 'other' to connect with the music and to feel like, 'She represents who I am.'" She added that she would talk about her sexual orientation "in due time". In 2013, Monáe said she wants both men and women to "still be attracted to [her]" and expressed support for the LGBTQ community.

Reporting in 2018 has Monáe identifying with both bisexuality and pansexuality. The same year, Tessa Thompson told Net-A-Porter, that she and Monáe loved each other "deeply" and were so close that they "vibrate on the same frequency," but clarified that "if people want to speculate about what we are, that's okay. It doesn't bother me."

On January 10, 2020, Monáe tweeted the hashtag #IAmNonbinary, along with a quoted tweet, which trended on Twitter that day. She said in an interview with The Cut a month after the tweet that "I tweeted the #IAmNonbinary hashtag in support of Nonbinary Day and to bring more awareness to the community. I retweeted the Steven Universe meme 'Are you a boy or a girl? I'm an experience' because it resonated with me, especially as someone who has pushed boundaries of gender since the beginning of my career. I feel my feminine energy, my masculine energy, and energy I can't even explain."

In April 2022, she came out publicly as non-binary on the Red Table Talk saying, "I'm nonbinary, so I just don't see myself as a woman, solely ... I feel like god is so much bigger than the 'he' or the 'she.' And if I am from God, I am everything." In the interview, she also acknowledged having been in both monogamous and polyamorous relationships. Following the interview, a representative of Monáe said that she "continues to use she/her pronouns." In an interview with the Los Angeles Times, Monáe again identified herself as non-binary and added that her "pronouns are free-ass motherfucker—and they/them, her/she".

== Filmography ==
=== Film ===
Year	Title	Role	Notes
2014	Rio 2	Dr. Monae	Voice
2016	Moonlight	Teresa	
2016	Hidden Figures	Mary Jackson	
2018	Welcome to Marwen	Julie	
2019	UglyDolls	Mandy	Voice
2019	Harriet	Marie Buchanon	
2019	Lady and the Tramp	Peg	Voice
2020	The Glorias	Dorothy Pitman Hughes	
2020	Antebellum	Veronica Henley / Eden	
2022	Glass Onion: A Knives Out Mystery	Cassandra Brand / Helen Brand	
2024	Golden	—N/a	Unreleased
2026	Is God Is	Angie	

=== Television ===
Year	Title	Role	Notes
2009	Stargate Universe	Herself	Episode: "Earth"; Performed "Many Moons"
2010	Dancing with the Stars	Herself	Performed "Tightrope"
2013	American Dad!	Announcer	Voice; Episode: "The Boring Identity"
2013	Saturday Night Live	Herself	Episode: "Edward Norton/Janelle Monáe"
2014	In Performance at the White House: Women of Soul	Herself	Performed "Goldfinger" and "Tightrope"
2014	Sesame Street	Herself/performer	Episode: "The Power of Yet"
2017	Philip K. Dick's Electric Dreams	Alice	Episode: "Autofac"
2018	Dirty Computer	Jane 57821	Short television film
2020	Sex, Explained	Herself	Narration
2020	Homecoming	Jacqueline Calico / Alex Eastern	Main cast (Season 2)
2021	We the People	Song performer	Episode: "We The People"
2022	Human Resources	Claudia	Voice; Episode: "The Light"
2023	RuPaul's Drag Race	Herself / Guest Judge	Episode: "House of Fashion"
2023	RuPaul's Drag Race: Untucked	Herself	Episode: "Untucked – House of Fashion"
2026	Bass X Machina	Glory	Voice; upcoming series
TBA	De La Resistance	Josephine Baker	Pre-production

== Discography ==
- The ArchAndroid (2010)
- The Electric Lady (2013)
- Dirty Computer (2018)
- The Age of Pleasure (2023)

== Tours ==
=== Headlining ===
- Metropolis Tour (2008)
- The ArchAndroid Tour (2010)
- Hooligans in Wondaland Tour (with Bruno Mars) (2011)
- Campus Consciousness Tour (with fun.) (2011)
- Summer Soul Festival (with Amy Winehouse and Mayer Hawthorne) (2011)
- The Electric Lady Tour (2013)
- The Golden Electric Tour (with Kimbra) (2014)
- Dirty Computer Tour (2018)
- Age of Pleasure Tour (2023)

=== Supporting ===
- No Doubt Summer Tour (2009)
- Out My Mind, Just in Time World Tour (2010)
- Palm Trees & Power Lines Tour (2010)
- California Dreams Tour (2011)
- I'm with You World Tour (2012)
- Music of the Spheres World Tour (2024)

== Bibliography ==
Publication year	Title	Publisher	Notes
2022	The Memory Librarian: And Other Stories of Dirty Computer	HarperCollins	In collaboration with: Yohanca Delgado, Eve L. Ewing, Alayna Dawn Johnson, Danny Lore, Sheree Renée Thomas
