= Q.U.E.E.N. =

Single by Janelle Monáe featuring Erykah Badu

from the album The Electric Lady
- Released: April 23, 2013
- Recorded: 2013
- Genre: Hip hop soul; crunk; funk
- Length: 5:10
- Label: Wondaland Arts Society; Bad Boy; Atlantic
- Songwriters: Janelle Robinson; Kellis Parker Jr.; Roman GianArthur Irvin; Nathaniel Irvin III; Charles Joseph II
- Producers: Nate "Rocket" Wonder; GianArthur; Monáe; Chuck Lightning

Janelle Monáe singles chronology
| "We Are Young" (2011) | "Q.U.E.E.N." (2013) | "Special Education" (2013) |

Erykah Badu singles chronology
| "See Thru to U" (2012) | "Q.U.E.E.N" (2013) |

Music video
- "Q.U.E.E.N." on YouTube

"Q.U.E.E.N." (acronym of "Queer, Untouchables, Emigrants, Excommunicated, and Negroid") is a song by American recording artist Janelle Monáe featuring the singer Erykah Badu. It was released on April 23, 2013, as the lead single from Monáe's second studio album, The Electric Lady. Stylized in the form of question and response, each line of the song has Monáe expressing her thoughts on subjects ranging from sexuality to religion. Prince, a mentor to Monáe, called the music video for "Q.U.E.E.N." the best music video of 2013.

== Song info ==
According to Monáe on her Twitter page, "Q.U.E.E.N." was inspired by "private discussions between her and Erykah Badu," and "is meant to make you jam, dance, funk out and dialogue later." While the album focuses on the empowerment of women and the need for women to control their own images, the single "Q.U.E.E.N." also focuses on the empowerment of other oppressed people. The title is an acronym for Queer, Untouchables, Emigrants, Excommunicated, and Negroid. Throughout the song, Monáe uses a question-answer format to explain the stereotypes, misconceptions, and oppression of those in the LGBT community, untouchables (those in poverty), emigrants (those who were forced to leave their home countries due to dangerous/unlivable circumstances), the excommunicated (those who have served/continue to serve time in prison), and the negroid (black people of all origins).

Monáe uses various terms and phrases from LGBT slang at the beginning of the song. She opens the song with, "I can't believe all of the things they say about me, walk in the room they throwin' shade from left to right. They be like 'ooh, she servin' face,' and I just tell 'em cut me up and get down." [emphasis added] Both phrases throwing shade and serving face are phrases used by many in the LGBT community, especially in the African-American gay community. She also alludes to lesbianism later in the song when she sings, "Hey, is it weird to like the way she wears her tights?" and, "Am I a freak because I love watchin' Mary?" Monáe then juxtaposes these references with religion by asking, "Hey brother can you save my soul from the devil?" and, "Hey sister am I good enough for your heaven? Will your God accept me in my black and white? Would he approve the way I'm made or should I deprogram, reprogram and get down?"

== Music video ==
A music video for the song, directed by Alan Ferguson, was released on May 1, 2013, with a length of 6 minutes and 4 seconds. It features Janelle Monáe as herself in the future. She, along with her band members and Badulla Oblongata (Badu), have been frozen in time and placed on display in the Ministry of Droids museum. They are all described as "rebels who time travel" by a representative for the Ministry of Droids at the beginning of the video. One woman dressed in all black and another dressed in black and white arrive at the museum and knock down the guards. They then put on Monáe's song "Q.U.E.E.N." and within seconds, Monáe and her band begin to reanimate. As well as portraying herself in the video, Monáe also portrays her android persona, Cindi Mayweather. Cindi, along with her android sisters, dance and question each other throughout the song. Towards the end of the video, Monáe delivers her climactic rap wearing her tuxedo "work uniform." The camera focuses in on her as she raps and then cuts to black immediately after she finishes. Writing for Billboard, Gregory DelliCarpini Jr. said of the music video, "Channeling the retro swagger of Elvis's "Jailhouse Rock" video, Monáe jams while surrounded by six dancing ladies rocking bold black-striped looks. Janelle contrasts the backup dancers in a solid look while getting her groove on in a puffy sleeved white shirt and black second skin pants paired with fierce metallic Givenchy heels." The music video features a prominent black and white theme. It is shown in the clothes, the background, the furniture, and even the people. Janelle Monáe has four costume changes throughout the entire video; and other than the first outfit we see on her, the only colors that we see are black and white. The first outfit has a black jacket with a white shirt and pants followed by a red sash over her and ended with black boots. The second outfit is a white ruffled shirt with black pants and silver heels, and the third outfit is a dress that is striped with black and white. The last outfit, a black and white tuxedo, is worn at the end when she raps the last part of the song. As well as the furniture being a mix of black and white, there are also black and white people. In the music video it looks like they are dancing with each other and teaching each other to dance. This theme seems to be important to Janelle Monáe because of the lyric, "Will your God accept me in my black and white, would he approve the way I'm made". This means that this aspect of black and white is important to who she is as a person, as she has discussed in the many interviews that she has done.

== Afrofuturism ==
Afrofuturism is described as works that mix the significance of African Diaspora qualities and pictures of technology to create a new future. The song "Q.U.E.E.N." is set in the future and throughout the song, Monáe talks about all the important features to her of being black. One of the aspects of Afrofuturism is the use of time travel, and in the music video, that is mentioned right away with the phrase, "it's hard to stop rebels who time travel". This mixes Janelle Monáe and her company with time travel. By using the art of time and how she and her rebels are frozen in time, this is her stating that time is a way to bring back those narratives. She also uses Afrofuturism in other music videos such as "Tightrope" and "Screwed".

== Critical reception ==
Critics wrote positive reviews of the song. Rolling Stone gave 3.5 stars saying it was, "an anthem of self-determination with a funkadelicious bass line, it downshifts into soul jazz midway through, with Erykah offering Badu-ist perspective ("Booty don't lie!"). Monáe transforms into a superhero MC to take it home." Afropunk wrote, "Q.U.E.E.N. does a good job of breaking free of the duality of the black and white Janelle wears proudly." Another review by the Chicago Tribune proclaims, "Yessssssssss! Honestly, that's all that needs to be said. This song kicks so much butt." Much of the reception is praising Monáe for her uniqueness that she tries to employ throughout the music video.

== Live performances ==
Monáe first performed the song live at the 2013 BET Awards along with Erykah Badu to critical acclaim. She has also performed the song at the 2013 iTunes Festival in London.

== Track listing ==
Q.U.E.E.N. – Single
| No. | Title | Length |
|---|---|---|
| 1. | "Q.U.E.E.N." (featuring Erykah Badu) | 5:10 |

Q.U.E.E.N. – Remixes
| No. | Title | Length |
|---|---|---|
| 1. | "Q.U.E.E.N. [Tradelove Remix]" (featuring Erykah Badu) | 5:25 |
| 2. | "Q.U.E.E.N. [The FatRat Remix]" (featuring Erykah Badu) | 3:30 |
| 3. | "Q.U.E.E.N. [ATFC's Return of the Boom Bap Remix]" (featuring Erykah Badu) | 6:56 |
| 4. | "Q.U.E.E.N. [Solidisco Remix]" (featuring Erykah Badu) | 4:22 |
| 5. | "Q.U.E.E.N. [Barjo Remix]" (featuring Erykah Badu) | 4:31 |
| 6. | "Q.U.E.E.N. [Vindata Remix]" (featuring Erykah Badu) | 6:18 |

== Charts ==
| Chart (2014) | Peak position |
|---|---|
| South Korea International (Circle) | 83 |
| US Hot R&B/Hip-Hop Songs (Billboard) | 47 |
| US Heatseekers Songs (Billboard) | 22 |
