= 53rd Annual Grammy Awards =

2011 US music awards ceremony

- Date: February 13, 2011
- Location: Staples Center, Los Angeles

Highlights
- Most awards: Lady Antebellum (5)
- Most nominations: Eminem (10)
- Website: https://www.grammy.com/awards/53rd-annual-grammy-awards

Television/radio coverage
- Network: CBS
- Viewership: 26.6 million viewers

The 53rd Annual Grammy Awards were held on February 13, 2011, at the Staples Center in Los Angeles. They were broadcast on CBS with a rating of 26.6 million viewers. Barbra Streisand was honored as the MusiCares Person of the Year two nights prior to the telecast on February 11. Nominations were announced on December 1, 2010 and a total of 108 awards were presented. Most of the awards were presented during the pre-telecast, which took place at the Los Angeles Convention Center next to the Staples Center, where the main telecast took place. The eligibility period was October 1, 2009 to September 30, 2010.

For the third year, nominations were announced on prime-time television as part of "The GRAMMY Nominations Concert Live! – Countdown to Music's Biggest Night" a one-hour special broadcast live on CBS from Club Nokia at L.A. Live.

Arcade Fire won Album of the Year for The Suburbs becoming the first indie act to do so, and surprising many viewers and critics. Baba Yetu composed and arranged by Christopher Tin won Best Instrumental Arrangement Accompanying Vocalist(s), the first Grammy given to a piece of music written for a video game. Esperanza Spalding was awarded Best New Artist. Lady Antebellum won five awards including Record of the Year and Song of the Year for "Need You Now". Other multiple winners include: David Frost, John Legend, Lady Gaga, Jay-Z, and Jeff Beck with three awards each. The Black Keys, Eminem, Herbie Hancock, Alicia Keys, The Roots, Usher, Christopher Tin and BeBe Winans won two awards each.

The television broadcast of the 53rd Grammy Awards marked the last awards show for the Grammy's executive producer, John Cossette, before his death on April 26, 2011.

At the request of manager and music impresario, Lisa Roy, the album was compiled and mastered by music producer, Stewart Cararas. All attendees of the 2011 Academy Awards received the CD in their gift bags.

== Performers ==
=== Pre-telecast ceremony ===
- ChocQuibTown
- Trombone Shorty
- Buddy Guy, Cyndi Lauper, Maria Muldaur, Kenny Wayne Shepherd, Mavis Staples, and Betty Wright
- Kirk Whalum

=== Telecast ceremony ===
The following performed:

Artist(s)	Song(s)
Yolanda Adams; Christina Aguilera; Jennifer Hudson; Martina McBride; Florence Welch	Tribute to Aretha Franklin: "(You Make Me Feel Like) A Natural Woman" "Ain't No Way" (Aguilera) "Until You Come Back to Me (That's What I'm Gonna Do)" (McBride) "Think" (Welch) "Respect" (Hudson) "Spirit in the Dark" (Adams) "Sisters Are Doin' It for Themselves"
Lady Gaga	"Born This Way"
Miranda Lambert	"The House That Built Me"
Muse	"Uprising"
B.o.B; Bruno Mars; Janelle Monáe	"Nothin' on You" "Grenade" "Cold War"
Justin Bieber; Jaden Smith	"Baby" "Never Say Never"
Usher; Justin Bieber	"OMG"
Mumford & Sons; The Avett Brothers; Bob Dylan	"The Cave" "Head Full of Doubt/Road Full of Promise" "Maggie's Farm"
Lady Antebellum	"If You Don't Know Me By Now" "American Honey" "Need You Now"
Cee-Lo Green; Gwyneth Paltrow; Henson Company Puppets	"Forget You"
Katy Perry	"Not Like the Movies" "Teenage Dream"
Norah Jones; John Mayer; Keith Urban	Tribute to Dolly Parton "Jolene"
Eminem; Adam Levine; Rihanna; Skylar Grey; Dr. Dre	"Love the Way You Lie (Part II)" "I Need a Doctor"
Mick Jagger; Raphael Saadiq	Tribute to Solomon Burke "Everybody Needs Somebody to Love"
Barbra Streisand	"Evergreen"
Rihanna; Drake	"What's My Name?"
Arcade Fire	"Month of May" "Ready to Start"

== Presenters ==
Pre-telecast ceremony

- BT
- Kathy Griffin
- Wayne Wallace
- Laurie Anderson
- Sara Bareilles

Telecast ceremony

The following presented:

- LL Cool J — presented the Aretha Franklin-tribute
- Ricky Martin — introduced Lady Gaga
- Blake Shelton — introduced Miranda Lambert
- Lenny Kravitz — introduced Muse
- Ryan Seacrest — introduced Bruno Mars, B.o.B, and Janelle Monáe
- Dierks Bentley and Zac Brown — presented Best Female Country Vocal Performance
- Eva Longoria — introduced Justin Bieber, Jaden Smith and Usher
- Paramore and Pauley Perrette — presented Best Rock Album
- Selena Gomez and Donnie Wahlberg — presented Best Pop Vocal Album
- David Letterman — introduced Bob Dylan, Mumford & Sons, and The Avett Bros.
- Clay Matthews and Lea Michele — introduced Lady Antebellum
- Kings of Leon and Miley Cyrus — presented Best Country Album
- Jamie Foxx — introduced Cee Lo Green, Gwyneth Paltrow and The Jim Henson Company Puppets
- Neil Patrick Harris — introduced Katy Perry
- John Mayer, Norah Jones and Keith Urban — presented Song of the Year
- Seth Rogen — introduced Eminem, Dr. Dre, and Rihanna
- Jewel and John Legend — presented Best New Artist
- Matthew Morrison — introduced Recording Academy President Neil Portnow
- Kris Kristofferson — introduced Barbra Streisand
- Nicki Minaj and will.i.am — presented Best Rap Album
- Diddy — introduced Drake and Rihanna
- Marc Anthony and Jennifer Lopez — presented Record of the Year
- Barbra Streisand and Kris Kristofferson — presented Album of the Year
- Jason Segel — introduced Arcade Fire

== Awards ==
=== General ===
Record of the Year

- "Need You Now" – Lady Antebellum
  - Lady Antebellum & Paul Worley, producers; Clarke Schleicher, engineer/mixer
- "Nothin' on You" – B.o.B & Bruno Mars
  - The Smeezingtons, producers; Ari Levine, engineer/mixer
- "Love the Way You Lie" – Eminem featuring Rihanna
  - Alex da Kid & Makeba Riddick, producers; Alex da Kid, Eminem & Mike Strange, engineers/mixers
- "F*** You" – Cee-Lo Green
  - The Smeezingtons, producers; Manny Marroquin & Graham Marsh, engineers/mixers
- "Empire State of Mind" – Jay-Z & Alicia Keys
  - Angela Hunte, Jane't "Jnay" Sewell-Ulepic & Shux, producers; Ken "Duro" Ifill, Gimel "Young Guru" Keaton & Ann Mincieli, engineers/mixers

Album of the Year

- The Suburbs – Arcade Fire
  - Arcade Fire & Markus Dravs, producers; Arcade Fire, Mark Lawson & Craig Silvey, engineers/mixers; Mark Lawson, mastering engineer
- Recovery – Eminem
  - Kobe, Lil Wayne, Pink & Rihanna, featured artists; Alex da Kid, Victor Alexander, Boi-1da, Nick Brongers, Dwayne "Supa Dups" Chin-Quee, DJ Khalil, Dr. Dre, Eminem, Jason Gilbert, Havoc, Emile Haynie, Jim Jonsin, Just Blaze, Magnedo7, Mr. Porter, Robert Reyes, Makeba Riddick & Script Shepherd, producers; Alex Da Kid, Dwayne "Supa Dups" Chin-Quee, Kal "Boogie" Dellaportas, Dr. Dre, Eminem, Mauricio "Veto" Iragorri, Just Blaze, Robert Marks, Alex Merzin, Matthew Samuels, Joe Strange, Mike Strange & Ryan West, engineers/mixers; Brian "Big Bass" Gardner, mastering engineer
- Need You Now – Lady Antebellum
  - Lady Antebellum & Paul Worley, producers; Clarke Schleicher, engineer/mixer; Andrew Mendelson, mastering engineer
- The Fame Monster – Lady Gaga
  - Beyoncé, featured artist; Ron Fair, Fernando Garibay, Tal Herzberg, Rodney Jerkins, Lady Gaga, RedOne, Teddy Riley & Space Cowboy, producers; Victor Alexander, Eelco Bakker, Christian Delano, Mike Donaldson, Paul Foley, Tal Herzberg, Rodney Jenkins, Hisashi Mizoguchi, Robert Orton, Dan Parry, Jack Joseph Puig, RedOne, Teddy Riley, Dave Russel, Johnny Severin, Space Cowboy, Mark Stent, Jonas Wetling & Frank Wolff, engineers/mixers; Gene Grimaldi, mastering engineer
- Teenage Dream – Katy Perry
  - Snoop Dogg, featured artist; Ammo, Benny Blanco, Dr. Luke, Kuk Harrell, Max Martin, Stargate, C. "Tricky" Stewart, Sandy Vee & Greg Wells, producers; Victor Alexander, Steve Churchyard, Mikkel S. Eriksen, Serban Ghenea, John Hanes, Sam Holland, Jaycen-Joshua, Damien Lewis, Chris O'Ryan, Carlos Oyanedel, Paris, Phil Tan, Brain Thomas, Lewis Tozour, Miles Walker, Emily Wright & Andrew Wuepper, engineers/mixers; Brian Gardner, mastering engineer

Song of the Year

- "Need You Now"
  - Dave Haywood, Josh Kear, Charles Kelley & Hillary Scott, songwriters (Lady Antebellum)
- "Beg, Steal or Borrow"
  - Ray LaMontagne, songwriter (Ray LaMontagne and the Pariah Dogs)
- "F*** You"
  - Cee Lo Green, Philip Lawrence & Bruno Mars, songwriters (Cee Lo Green)
- "The House That Built Me"
  - Tom Douglas & Allen Shamblin songwriters (Miranda Lambert)
- "Love the Way You Lie"
  - Alexander Grant, Holly Hafferman & Marshall Mathers, songwriters (Eminem featuring Rihanna)

Best New Artist

- Esperanza Spalding
- Justin Bieber
- Drake
- Florence & The Machine
- Mumford & Sons

=== Pop ===
Best Female Pop Vocal Performance

- "Bad Romance" – Lady Gaga
- "King of Anything" – Sara Bareilles
- "Halo" (Live from I Am... Yours: An Intimate Performance at Wynn Las Vegas) – Beyoncé
- "Chasing Pirates" – Norah Jones
- "Teenage Dream" – Katy Perry

Best Male Pop Vocal Performance

- "Just the Way You Are" – Bruno Mars
- "Haven't Met You Yet" – Michael Bublé
- "This Is It" – Michael Jackson
- "Whataya Want from Me" – Adam Lambert
- "Half of My Heart" – John Mayer

Best Pop Performance by a Duo or Group with Vocal

- "Hey, Soul Sister" (Live) – Train
- "Don't Stop Believin'" (Regionals Version) – Glee Cast (Note: Nominated vocalists: Cory Monteith, Lea Michele, Chris Colfer, Amber Riley, Kevin McHale, Jenna Ushkowitz, Mark Salling and Naya Rivera)
- "Misery" – Maroon 5
- "The Only Exception" – Paramore
- "Babyfather" – Sade

Best Pop Collaboration with Vocals

- "Imagine" – Herbie Hancock, Pink, India.Arie, Seal, Konono Nº1, Jeff Beck, & Oumou Sangaré
- "Airplanes, Part II" – B.o.B, Eminem, & Hayley Williams
- "If It Wasn't for Bad" – Elton John & Leon Russell
- "Telephone" – Lady Gaga & Beyoncé
- "California Gurls" – Katy Perry & Snoop Dogg

Best Pop Instrumental Performance

- "Nessun Dorma" – Jeff Beck
- "Flow" – Laurie Anderson
- "No Mystery" – Stanley Clarke
- "Orchestral Intro" – Gorillaz
- "Sleepwalk" – The Brian Setzer Orchestra

Best Pop Instrumental Album

- Take Your Pick – Larry Carlton & Tak Matsumoto
- Pushing the Envelope – Gerald Albright
- Heart and Soul – Kenny G
- Singularity – Robby Krieger
- Everything Is Everything: The Music of Donny Hathaway – Kirk Whalum

Best Pop Vocal Album

- The Fame Monster – Lady Gaga
- My World 2.0 – Justin Bieber
- I Dreamed a Dream – Susan Boyle
- Battle Studies – John Mayer
- Teenage Dream – Katy Perry

=== Dance ===
Best Dance Recording

- "Only Girl (In the World)" – Rihanna
  - Crystal Johnson, Mikkel S. Eriksen, Tor Erik Hermansen, Sandy Wilhelm, producers: Stargate, Sandy Vee
- "Rocket" – Goldfrapp
  - Alison Goldfrapp & Will Gregory, producers; Mark 'Spike' Stent, mixer
- "In for the Kill" – La Roux
  - Elly Jackson & Ben Langmaid, producers; Serban Ghenea & John Hanes, mixers
- "Dance in the Dark" – Lady Gaga
  - Fernando Garibay & Lady Gaga, producers; Robert Orton, mixer
- "Dancing on My Own" – Robyn
  - Patrik Berger & Robyn, producers; Niklas Flyckt, mixer

Best Electronic/Dance Album

- La Roux – La Roux
- These Hopeful Machines – BT
- Further – The Chemical Brothers
- Head First – Goldfrapp
- Black Light – Groove Armada

=== Traditional pop ===
Best Traditional Pop Vocal Album

- Crazy Love – Michael Bublé
- The Greatest Love Songs of All Time – Barry Manilow
- Let It Be Me: Mathis in Nashville – Johnny Mathis
- Fly Me to the Moon... The Great American Songbook Volume V – Rod Stewart
- Love Is the Answer – Barbra Streisand

=== Rock ===
Best Solo Rock Vocal Performance

- "Helter Skelter" – Paul McCartney
- "Run Back to Your Side" – Eric Clapton
- "Crossroads" – John Mayer
- "Silver Rider" – Robert Plant and the Band of Joy
- "Angry World" – Neil Young

Best Rock Performance by a Duo or Group with Vocal

- "Tighten Up" – The Black Keys
- "Ready to Start" – Arcade Fire
- "I Put a Spell on You" – Jeff Beck & Joss Stone
- "Radioactive" – Kings of Leon
- "Resistance" – Muse

Best Hard Rock Performance

- "New Fang" – Them Crooked Vultures
- "A Looking in View" – Alice in Chains
- "Let Me Hear You Scream" – Ozzy Osbourne
- "Black Rain" – Soundgarden
- "Between the Lines" – Stone Temple Pilots

Best Metal Performance

- "El Dorado" – Iron Maiden
- "Let the Guilt Go" – Korn
- "In Your Words" – Lamb of God
- "Sudden Death" – Megadeth
- "World Painted Blood" – Slayer

Best Rock Instrumental Performance

- "Hammerhead" – Jeff Beck
- "Black Mud" – The Black Keys
- "Do the Murray" – Los Lobos
- "Kundalini Bonfire" – Dave Matthews & Tim Reynolds
- "The Deathless Horsie" – Dweezil Zappa

Best Rock Song

- "Angry World"
  - Neil Young, songwriter (Neil Young)
- "Little Lion Man"
  - Ted Dwane, Ben Lovett, Marcus Mumford & Country Winston, songwriters (Mumford & Sons)
- "Radioactive"
  - Caleb Followill, Jared Followill, Matthew Followill & Nathan Followill, songwriters (Kings of Leon)
- "Resistance"
  - Matthew Bellamy, songwriter (Muse)
- "Tighten Up"
  - Dan Auerbach & Patrick Carney, songwriters (The Black Keys)

Best Rock Album

- The Resistance – Muse
- Emotion & Commotion – Jeff Beck
- Backspacer – Pearl Jam
- Mojo – Tom Petty and the Heartbreakers
- Le Noise – Neil Young

=== Alternative ===
Best Alternative Music Album

- Brothers – The Black Keys
- The Suburbs – Arcade Fire
- Infinite Arms – Band of Horses
- Broken Bells – Broken Bells
- Contra – Vampire Weekend

=== R&B ===
Best Female R&B Vocal Performance

- "Bittersweet" – Fantasia
- "Everything to Me" – Monica
- "Gone Already" – Faith Evans
- "Tired" – Kelly Price
- "Holding You Down" – Jazmine Sullivan

Best Male R&B Vocal Performance

- "There Goes My Baby" – Usher
- "Second Chance" – El DeBarge
- "Finding My Way Back" – Jaheim
- "Why Would You Stay" – Kem
- "We're Still Friends" – Kirk Whalum & Musiq Soulchild

Best R&B Performance by a Duo or Group with Vocals

- "Soldier of Love" – Sade
- "Love" – Chuck Brown, Jill Scott & Marcus Miller
- "Take My Time" – Chris Brown & Tank
- "You've Got a Friend" – Ronald Isley & Aretha Franklin
- "Shine" – John Legend & The Roots

Best Traditional R&B Vocal Performance

- "Hang On in There" – John Legend & The Roots
- "When a Woman Loves" – R. Kelly
- "You're So Amazing" – Calvin Richardson
- "In Between" – Ryan Shaw
- "Go" (Live) – Betty Wright

Best Urban/Alternative Performance

- "Fuck You" – Cee Lo Green
- "Little One" – Bilal
- "Orion" – Carolyn Malachi
- "Tightrope" – Janelle Monáe & Big Boi
- "Still" – Eric Roberson

Best R&B Song

- "Shine"
  - John Stephens, songwriter (John Legend & The Roots)
- "Bittersweet"
  - Charles Harmon & Claude Kelly, songwriters (Fantasia)
- "Finding My Way Back"
  - Ivan "Orthodox" Barias, Curt Chambers, Carvin "Ransum" Haggins, Jaheim Hoagland & Miquel Jontel, songwriters (Jaheim)
- "Second Chance"
  - El DeBarge & Mischke, songwriters (El DeBarge)
- "Why Would You Stay"
  - Kim Owens, songwriter (Kem)

Best R&B Album

- Wake Up! – John Legend & The Roots
- Still Standing – Monica
- Back to Me – Fantasia
- Another Round – Jaheim
- The Love & War Masterpeace – Raheem DeVaughn

Best Contemporary R&B Album

- Raymond vs. Raymond – Usher
- Untitled – R. Kelly
- Graffiti – Chris Brown
- Transition – Ryan Leslie
- The ArchAndroid – Janelle Monáe

=== Rap ===
Best Rap Solo Performance

- "Not Afraid" – Eminem
- "Over" – Drake
- "How Low" – Ludacris
- "I'm Back" – T.I.
- "Power" – Kanye West

Best Rap Performance by a Duo or Group

- "On to the Next One" – Jay Z & Swizz Beatz
- "Shutterbugg" – Big Boi & Cutty
- "Fancy" – Drake, T.I. & Swizz Beatz
- "My Chick Bad" – Ludacris & Nicki Minaj
- "Lose My Mind" – Young Jeezy & Plies

Best Rap/Sung Collaboration

- "Empire State of Mind" – Jay-Z & Alicia Keys
- "Nothin' on You" – B.o.B & Bruno Mars
- "Deuces" – Chris Brown, Tyga & Kevin McCall
- "Love the Way You Lie" – Eminem & Rihanna
- "Wake Up Everybody" – John Legend, The Roots, Melanie Fiona & Common

Best Rap Song

- "Empire State of Mind"
  - Shawn Carter, Angela Hunte, Burt Keyes, Alicia Keys, Jane't "Jnay" Sewell-Ulepic & Alexander Shuckburgh, songwriters (Jay-Z & Alicia Keys)
- "Love the Way You Lie"
  - Alex da Kid, Holly Hafferman & Marshall Mathers, songwriters (Eminem & Rihanna)
- "Not Afraid"
  - Matthew Burnett, Jordan Evans, Marshall Mathers, Luis Resto & Matthew Samuels, songwriters (Eminem)
- "Nothin' on You"
  - Philip Lawrence, Ari Levine, Bruno Mars & Bobby Simmons Jr., songwriters (B.o.B. & Bruno Mars)
- "On to the Next One"
  - Shawn Carter, Kasseem Dean, Gaspard Augé, Xavier de Rosnay & Jessie Chaton, songwriters (Jay-Z & Swizz Beatz)

Best Rap Album

- Recovery – Eminem
- The Adventures Of Bobby Ray – B.o.B.
- Thank Me Later – Drake
- The Blueprint 3 – Jay-Z
- How I Got Over – The Roots

=== Country ===
Best Female Country Vocal Performance

- "The House That Built Me" – Miranda Lambert
- "Satisfied" – Jewel
- "Swingin'" – LeAnn Rimes
- "Temporary Home" – Carrie Underwood
- "I'd Love To Be Your Last" – Gretchen Wilson

Best Male Country Vocal Performance

- "'Til Summer Comes Around" – Keith Urban
- "Macon" – Jamey Johnson
- "Cryin' for Me (Wayman's Song)" – Toby Keith
- "Turning Home" – David Nail
- "Gettin' You Home" – Chris Young

Best Country Performance by a Duo or Group with Vocals

- "Need You Now" – Lady Antebellum
- "Free" – Zac Brown Band
- "Elizabeth" – Dailey & Vincent
- "Little White Church" – Little Big Town
- "Where Rainbows Never Die" – The SteelDrivers

Best Country Collaboration with Vocals

- "As She's Walking Away" – Zac Brown Band & Alan Jackson
- "Bad Angel" – Dierks Bentley, Miranda Lambert & Jamey Johnson
- "Pride (In the Name of Love)" – Dierks Bentley, Del McCoury & The Punch Brothers
- "Hillbilly Bone" – Blake Shelton & Trace Adkins
- "I Run to You" – Marty Stuart & Connie Smith

Best Country Instrumental Performance

- "Hummingbyrd" – Marty Stuart
- "Tattoo of a Smudge" – Cherryholmes
- "Magic #9" – The Infamous Stringdusters
- "New Chance Blues" – Punch Brothers
- "Willow Creek" – Darrell Scott

Best Country Song

- "Need You Now"

Dave Haywood, Josh Kear, Charles Kelley & Hillary Scott, songwriters (Lady Antebellum)

- "The Breath You Take"
  - Casey Beathard, Dean Dillon & Jessie Jo Dillon, songwriters (George Strait)
- "Free"
  - Zac Brown, songwriter (Zac Brown Band)
- "The House That Built Me"
  - Tom Douglas & Allen Shamblin, songwriters (Miranda Lambert)
- "I'd Love to Be Your Last"
  - Rivers Rutherford, Annie Tate & Sam Tate, songwriters (Gretchen Wilson)
- "If I Die Young"
  - Kimberly Perry, songwriter (The Band Perry)

Best Country Album

- Need You Now – Lady Antebellum
- Up On The Ridge – Dierks Bentley
- You Get What You Give – Zac Brown Band
- The Guitar Song – Jamey Johnson
- Revolution – Miranda Lambert

=== New Age ===
Best New Age Album

- Miho: Journey to the Mountain – Paul Winter Consort
- Ocean – Michael DeMaria
- Sacred Journey of Ku-Kai, Volume 4 – Kitaro
- Dancing into Silence – R. Carlos Nakai, William Eaton & Will Clipman
- Instrumental Oasis, Vol. 4 – Zamora

=== Jazz ===
Best Contemporary Jazz Album

- The Stanley Clarke Band – The Stanley Clarke Band
- Never Can Say Goodbye – Joey DeFrancesco
- Now Is the Time – Jeff Lorber Fusion
- To the One – John McLaughlin
- Backatown – Trombone Shorty

Best Jazz Vocal Album

- Eleanora Fagan (1915-1959): To Billie with Love from Dee Dee Bridgewater – Dee Dee Bridgewater
- Freddy Cole Sings Mr. B – Freddy Cole
- When Lights Are Low – Denise Donatelli
- Ages – Lorraine Feather
- Water – Gregory Porter

Best Improvised Jazz Solo

- "A Change Is Gonna Come" – Herbie Hancock
- "Solar" – Alan Broadbent
- "Body and Soul" – Keith Jarrett
- "Lonely Woman" – Hank Jones
- "Van Gogh" – Wynton Marsalis

Best Jazz Instrumental Album, Individual or Group

- Moody 4B – James Moody
- Positootly! – John Beasley
- The New Song and Dance – Clayton Brothers
- Historicity – Vijay Iyer Trio
- Providencia – Danilo Pérez

Best Large Jazz Ensemble Album

- Mingus Big Band Live at Jazz Standard – Mingus Big Band
- Infernal Machines – Darcy James Argue's Secret Society
- Autumn: In Moving Pictures Jazz – Chamber Music Vol. 2 – Billy Childs Ensemble featuring the Ying String Quartet
- Pathways – Dave Holland Octet
- 54 – Metropole Orkest, John Scofield & Vince Mendoza

Best Latin Jazz Album

- Chucho's Steps – Chucho Valdés and the Afro-Cuban Messengers
- Tango Grill – Pablo Aslan
- Second Chance – Hector Martignon
- Psychedelic Blues – Poncho Sanchez
- ¡Bien Bien! – Wayne Wallace Latin Jazz Quintet

=== Gospel ===
Best Gospel Performance

- "Grace" – BeBe & CeCe Winans
- "He Wants It All" – Forever Jones
- "You Hold My World" – Israel Houghton
- "Nobody Greater" – VaShawn Mitchell
- "He's Been Just That Good – Kirk Whalum & Lalah Hathaway

Best Gospel Song

- "It's What I Do"
  - Jerry Peters & Kirk Whalum, songwriters (Kirk Whalum & Lalah Hathaway)
- "Beautiful Things"
  - Lisa Gungor & Michael Gungor, songwriters (Gungor)
- "Better Than a Hallelujah"
  - Sarah Hart & Chapin Hartford, songwriters (Amy Grant)
- "Our God"
  - Jonas Myrin, Matt Redman, Jesse Reeves & Chris Tomlin, songwriters (Chris Tomlin)
- "Return to Sender"
  - Gordon Kennedy, songwriter (Ricky Skaggs)

Best Rock or Rap Gospel Album

- Hello Hurricane – Switchfoot
- Church Music – David Crowder Band
- For Those Who Wait – Fireflight
- Beautiful Things – Gungor
- Rehab – Lecrae

Best Pop/Contemporary Gospel Album

- Love God. Love People. – Israel Houghton
- Beauty Will Rise – Steven Curtis Chapman
- Pieces of a Real Heart – Sanctus Real
- Mosaic – Ricky Skaggs
- Tonight – TobyMac

Best Southern, Country, or Bluegrass Gospel Album

- The Reason – Diamond Rio
- Times Like These – Austins Bridge
- Expecting Good Things – Jeff & Sheri Easter
- Journey On – Ty Herndon
- Live at Oak Tree: Karen Peck & New River – Karen Peck & New River

Best Traditional Gospel Album

- Downtown Church – Patty Griffin
- The Experience – Vanessa Bell Armstrong
- A City Called Heaven – Shirley Caesar
- Here I Am – Marvin Sapp
- All in One – Karen Clark Sheard

Best Contemporary R&B Gospel Album

- Still – BeBe & CeCe Winans
- Get Ready – Forever Jones
- Love Unstoppable – Fred Hammond
- Triumphant – VaShawn Mitchell
- Aaron Sledge – Aaron Sledge

=== Latin ===
Best Latin Pop Album

- Paraíso Express – Alejandro Sanz
- Poquita Ropa – Ricardo Arjona
- Alex Cuba – Alex Cuba
- Boleto de Entrada – Kany García
- Otra Cosa – Julieta Venegas

Best Latin Rock, Alternative or Urban Album

- El Existential – Grupo Fantasma
- Oro – ChocQuibTown
- Amor Vincit Omnia – Draco
- Bulevar 2000 – Nortec Collective Presents: Bostich+Fussible
- 1977 – Ana Tijoux

Best Tropical Latin Album

- Viva la Tradición – Spanish Harlem Orchestra
- Sin Salsa No Hay Paraiso – El Gran Combo de Puerto Rico
- A Son de Guerra – Juan Luis Guerra 4.40
- Irrepetible – Gilberto Santa Rosa
- 100 Sones Cubanos – (Various Artists); Edesio Alejandro, Nelson Estevez & Juan Hidalgo, producers

Best Tejano Album

- Recuerdos – Little Joe & la Familia
- Sabes Bien – Juan P. Moreno
- In the Pocket – Joe Posada
- Homenaje a Mi Padre – Sunny Sauceda y Todo Eso
- Cookin – Tortilla Factory

Best Norteño Album

- Classic – Intocable
- Indispensable – Angel Fresnillo
- Ni Hoy Ni Mañana – Gerardo Ortíz
- Desde la Cantina Volumen 1 – Pesado
- Intensamente – Principez de la Musica Norteña

Best Banda Album

- Enamórate de Mí – El Guero Y Su Banda Centenario
- Ando Bien Pedo – Banda Los Recoditos
- Caricias Compradas... – Cuisillos
- Con la Fuerza del Corrido – El Chapo
- Todo Depende de Ti – La Arrolladora Banda El Limón

=== American roots music ===
Best Americana Album

- You Are Not Alone – Mavis Staples
- The List – Rosanne Cash
- Tin Can Trust – Los Lobos
- Country Music – Willie Nelson
- Band of Joy – Robert Plant

Best Bluegrass Album

- Mountain Soul II – Patty Loveless
- Circles Around Me – Sam Bush
- Family Circle – The Del McCoury Band
- Legacy – Peter Rowan Bluegrass Band
- Reckless – The SteelDrivers

Best Traditional Blues Album

- Joined at the Hip – Pinetop Perkins & Willie 'Big Eyes' Smith
- Giant – James Cotton
- Memphis Blues – Cyndi Lauper
- The Well – Charlie Musselwhite
- Plays Blues, Ballads & Favorites – Jimmie Vaughan

Best Contemporary Blues Album

- Living Proof – Buddy Guy
- Nothing's Impossible – Solomon Burke
- Tribal – Dr. John and the Lower 911
- Interpretations: The British Rock Songbook – Bettye LaVette
- Live! In Chicago – Kenny Wayne Shepherd Band featuring Hubert Sumlin, Willie "Big Eyes" Smith, Bryan Lee, and Buddy Flett

Best Traditional Folk Album

- Genuine Negro Jig – Carolina Chocolate Drops
- Onward and Upward – Luther Dickinson & The Sons Of Mudboy
- Memories of John – The John Hartford Stringband
- Maria Muldaur & Her Garden Of Joy – Maria Muldaur
- Ricky Skaggs Solo: Songs My Dad Loved – Ricky Skaggs

Best Contemporary Folk Album

- God Willin' & the Creek Don't Rise – Ray LaMontagne and the Pariah Dogs
- Love Is Strange: En Vivo Con Tino – Jackson Browne & David Lindley
- The Age of Miracles – Mary Chapin Carpenter
- Somedays the Song Writes You – Guy Clark
- Dream Attic – Richard Thompson

Best Hawaiian Music Album

- Huana Ke Aloha – Tia Carrere
- Amy Hanaiali'i and Slack Key Masters of Hawaii – Amy Hanaiali'i And Slack Key Masters of Hawaii
- Polani – Daniel Ho
- The Legend – Ledward Kaapana
- Maui on My Mind – Hawaiian Slack Key Guitar – Jeff Peterson

Best Native American Music Album

- 2010 Gathering of Nations Pow Wow: A Spirit's Dance – (Various Artists); Derek Mathews, Dr. Lita Mathews & Melonie Mathews, producers
- XI – Bear Creek
- Temptations: Cree Round Dance Songs – Northern Cree
- Woodnotes Wyld: Historic Flute Sounds from the Dr. Richard W. Payne Collection – Peter Phippen

Best Zydeco or Cajun Music Album

- Zydeco Junkie – Chubby Carrier and the Bayou Swamp Band
- En Couleurs – Feufollet
- Happy Go Lucky – D. L. Menard
- Back Home – The Pine Leaf Boys
- Creole Moon: Live at the Blue Moon Saloon – Cedric Watson et Bijou Créole

=== Reggae ===
Best Reggae Album

- Before the Dawn – Buju Banton
- Isaacs Meets Isaac – Gregory Isaacs & King Isaac
- Revelation – Lee "Scratch" Perry
- Made in Jamaica – Bob Sinclar And Sly & Robbie
- One Pop Reggae + – Sly & Robbie and the Family Taxi
- Legacy An Acoustic Tribute to Peter Tosh – Andrew Tosh

=== World music ===
Best Traditional World Music Album

- Ali and Toumani – Ali Farka Touré & Toumani Diabaté
- Pure Sounds – Gyuto Monks of Tibet
- I Speak Fula – Bassekou Kouyate & Ngoni Ba
- Mushtari- a live concert - Cassius Khan
- Grace – Soweto Gospel Choir
- Tango Universal – Vayo

Best Contemporary World Music Album

- Throw Down Your Heart, Africa Sessions Part 2: Unreleased Tracks – Béla Fleck
- All in One – Bebel Gilberto
- ÕŸÖ – Angelique Kidjo
- Bom Tempo – Sérgio Mendes
- Om Namo Narayanaya: Soul Call – Chandrika Krishnamurthy Tandon

=== Children's ===
Best Musical Album for Children

- Tomorrow's Children – Pete Seeger with the Rivertown Kids and Friends
- Here Comes Science – They Might Be Giants
- Jungle Gym – Justin Roberts
- Sunny Days – Battersby Duo
- Weird Things Are Everywhere! – Judy Pancoast

Best Spoken Word Album for Children

- Julie Andrews' Collection of Poems, Songs, And Lullabies – Julie Andrews & Emma Walton Hamilton
- Anne Frank: The Diary of a Young Girl: The Definitive Edition – Selma Blair
- The Best Candy in the Whole World – Bill Harley
- Healthy Food For Thought: Good Enough to Eat – (Various Artists); Jim Cravero, Paula Lizzi & Steve Pullara, producers
- Nanny McPhee Returns – Emma Thompson

=== Spoken Word ===
Best Spoken Word Album

- Earth – Jon Stewart (With Samantha Bee, Wyatt Cenac, Jason Jones, John Oliver & Sigourney Weaver)
- American on Purpose – Craig Ferguson
- The Bedwetter – Sarah Silverman
- A Funny Thing Happened on the Way to the Future... – Michael J. Fox
- This Time Together: Laughter and Reflection – Carol Burnett
- The Woody Allen Collection: Mere Anarchy, Side Effects, Without Feathers, Getting Even – Woody Allen

=== Comedy ===
Best Comedy Album

- Stark Raving Black – Lewis Black
- Cho Dependent – Margaret Cho
- I Told You I Was Freaky – Flight of the Conchords
- Kathy Griffin Does the Bible Belt – Kathy Griffin
- Weapons of Self Destruction – Robin Williams

=== Musical show ===
Best Musical Show Album

- American Idiot (featuring Green Day) – Billie Joe Armstrong, producer (Green Day, composers; Billie Joe Armstrong, lyricist)
- Fela! – Robert Sher, producer (Fela Anikulapo-Kuti, composer; Fela Anikulapo-Kuti, lyricist)
- A Little Night Music – Tommy Krasker, producer (Stephen Sondheim, composer; Stephen Sondheim, lyricist)
- Promises, Promises – David Caddick & David Lai, producers (Burt Bacharach, composer; Hal David, lyricist)
- Sondheim on Sondheim – Philip Chaffin & Tommy Krasker, producers (Stephen Sondheim, composer; Stephen Sondheim, lyricist)

=== Film, TV and other visual media ===
Best Compilation Soundtrack Album for Motion Picture, Television or Other Visual Media

- Crazy Heart
- Glee: The Music, Volume 1
- Tremé
- True Blood – Volume 2
- The Twilight Saga: Eclipse

Best Score Soundtrack Album for Motion Picture, Television or Other Visual Media

- Toy Story 3 – Randy Newman
- Alice in Wonderland – Danny Elfman
- Avatar – James Horner
- Inception – Hans Zimmer
- Sherlock Holmes – Hans Zimmer

Best Song Written for Motion Picture, Television or Other Visual Media

- "The Weary Kind" (From Crazy Heart)
  - Ryan Bingham & T Bone Burnett, songwriters (Ryan Bingham)
- "Down in New Orleans" (From The Princess and the Frog)
  - Randy Newman, songwriter (Dr. John)
- "I See You" (From Avatar)
  - Simon Franglen, Kuk Harrell & James Horner, songwriters (Leona Lewis)
- "Kiss Like Your Kiss" (From True Blood)
  - Lucinda Williams, songwriter (Lucinda Williams & Elvis Costello)
- "This City" (From Tremé)
  - Steve Earle, songwriter (Steve Earle)

=== Composing and arranging ===
Best Instrumental Composition

- "The Path Among the Trees" – Billy Childs
- "Aurora" – Patrick Williams
- "Battle Circle" – Gerald Clayton
- "Box of Cannoli" – Tim Hagans
- "Fourth Stream...La Banda" – Bill Cunliffe

Best Instrumental Arrangement

- "Carlos" – Vince Mendoza
- "Fanfare for a New Day" – Patrick Williams
- "Itsbynne Reel" – Gil Goldstein
- "Monet" – Ted Nash
- "Skip to My Lou" – Frank Macchia

Best Instrumental Arrangement Accompanying Vocalist(s)

- "Baba Yetu"
  - Christopher Tin, arranger (Christopher Tin, Soweto Gospel Choir & Royal Philharmonic Orchestra)
- "Baby"
  - Roger Treece, arranger (Bobby McFerrin)
- "Based on a Thousand True Stories"
  - Vince Mendoza, arranger (Silje Nergaard & Metropole Orchestra Strings)
- "Don't Explain"
  - Geoffrey Keezer, arranger (Denise Donatelli)
- "Imagine"
  - Herbie Hancock & Larry Klein, arrangers (Herbie Hancock, Pink, Seal, Jeff Beck, India.Arie, Konono No 1 & Oumou Sangare)

=== Package ===
Best Recording Package

- Brothers – Michael Carney, art director (The Black Keys)
- Eggs – Malene Mathiasson, Malthe Fischer, Kristoffer Rom, Nis Svoldgård & Aske Zidore, art directors (Oh No Ono)
- Hadestown – Brian Grunert, art director (Anaïs Mitchell)
- What Will We Be – Devendra Banhart & Jon Beasley, art directors (Devendra Banhart)
- Yonkers NY – Andrew Taray, art director (Chip Taylor)

Best Boxed or Special Limited Edition Package

- Under Great White Northern Lights (Limited Edition Box Set) – Rob Jones & Jack White III, art directors (The White Stripes)
- Light: On the South Side – Tom Lunt, Rob Sevier & Ken Shipley, art directors (Various Artists)
- Minotaur (Deluxe Edition) – Jeff Anderson & Vaughan Oliver, art directors (The Pixies)
- A Sideman's Journey (Limited Collector's Super Deluxe Box Set) – Daniel Reiss & Klaus Voormann, art directors (Voormann & Friends)
- Story Island – Qing-Yang Xiao, art director (Various Artists)

=== Album notes ===
Best Album Notes

- Keep an Eye on the Sky – Robert Gordon, album notes writer (Big Star)
- Alan Lomax in Haiti: Recordings for the Library of Congress, 1936–1937 – Gage Averill, album notes writer (Various Artists)
- Side Steps – Ashley Kahn, album notes writer (John Coltrane)
- There Breathes a Hope: The Legacy of John Work III and His Fisk Jubilee Quartet, 1909–1916 – Doug Seroff, album notes writer (Fisk University Jubilee Quartet)
- True Love Cast Out All Evil – Will Sheff, album notes writer (Roky Erickson With Okkervil River)

=== Historical ===
Best Historical Album

- The Beatles (The Original Studio Recordings)
  - Jeff Jones, compilation producer; Paul Hicks, Sean Magee, Guy Massey, Sam Okell & Steve Rooke, mastering engineers (The Beatles)
- Alan Lomax In Haiti: Recordings For The Library Of Congress, 1936–1937
  - Jeffrey A. Greenberg, David Katznelson & Anna Lomax Wood, compilation producers; Steve Rosenthal & Warren Russell-Smith, mastering engineers (Various Artists)
- The Complete Mother's Best Recordings...Plus!
  - Colin Escott, Mike Jason & Jett Williams, compilation producers; Joseph M. Palmaccio, mastering engineer (Hank Williams)
- Not Fade Away: The Complete Studio Recordings And More
  - Andy McKaie, compilation producer; Erick Labson, mastering engineer (Buddy Holly)
- Where the Action Is! Los Angeles Nuggets 1965–1968
  - Alec Palao, Cheryl Pawelski & Andrew Sandoval, compilation producers; Dan Hersch & Andrew Sandoval, mastering engineers (Various Artists)

=== Production, non-classical ===
Best Engineered Album, Non-Classical

- Battle Studies
  - Michael H. Brauer, Joe Ferla, Chad Franscoviak & Manny Marroquin, engineers (John Mayer)
- Dirty Side Down
  - John Keane, engineer (Widespread Panic)
- Emotion & Commotion
  - Steve Lipson, engineer (Jeff Beck)
- God Willin' & The Creek Don't Rise
  - Ryan Freeland, engineer (Ray LaMontagne And The Pariah Dogs)
- Pink Elephant
  - Seth Presant & Leon F. Sylvers III, engineers (N'dambi)

Producer Of The Year, Non-Classical

- Danger Mouse
  - Broken Bells – Broken Bells (A)
  - Dark Night of the Soul – Danger Mouse and Sparklehorse (A)
  - "Tighten Up" – The Black Keys (T)
- Rob Cavallo
  - Brand New Eyes – Paramore (A)
  - Hang Cool Teddy Bear – Meat Loaf (A)
  - Happy Hour – Uncle Kracker (A)
  - "Music Again" – Adam Lambert (T)
  - "Soaked" – Adam Lambert (T)
  - "Sure Fire Winners" – Adam Lambert (T)
  - "Time for Miracles" – Adam Lambert (T)
  - "When It's Time" – Green Day (T)
- Dr. Luke
  - "California Gurls" – Katy Perry featuring Snoop Dogg (T)
  - "For Your Entertainment" – Adam Lambert (T)
  - "Hungover" – Ke$ha (T)
  - "Kiss n Tell" – Ke$ha (T)
  - "Magic" – B.o.B. featuring Rivers Cuomo (T)
  - "Take It Off" – Ke$ha (T)
  - "Teenage Dream" – Katy Perry (T)
  - "Your Love Is My Drug" – Ke$ha (T)
- RedOne
  - "Alejandro" – Lady Gaga (S)
  - "Bad Romance" – Lady Gaga (S)
  - The Fame Monster – Lady Gaga (A)
  - "I Like It" – Enrique Iglesias Featuring Pitbull (S)
  - "More" – Usher (T)
  - "We Are the World 25 for Haiti" – Various Artists (S)
  - "Whole Lotta Love" – Mary J. Blige (S)
- The Smeezingtons (Bruno Mars, Philip Lawrence, Ari Levine)
  - "Billionaire" – Travie McCoy Featuring Bruno Mars (T)
  - "Bow Chicka Wow Wow" – Mike Posner (T)
  - "Fuck You" – Cee Lo Green (S)
  - "Island Queen" – Sean Kingston (T)
  - "Just the Way You Are" – Bruno Mars (S)
  - "Nothin' on You" – B.o.B Featuring Bruno Mars (T)

Best Remixed Recording, Non-Classical

- "Revolver (David Guetta's One Love Club Remix)"
  - David Guetta & Afrojack, remixers (Madonna)
- "Fantasy (Morgan Page Remix)"
  - Morgan Page, remixer (Nadia Ali)
- "Funk Nasty (Wolfgang Gartner Remix Edit)"
  - Wolfgang Gartner, remixer (Andy Caldwell Featuring Gram'ma Funk)
- "Orpheus (Quiet Carnival) (Funk Generation Mix)"
  - Mike Rizzo, remixer (Sérgio Mendes)
- "Sweet Disposition (Axwell & Dirty South Remix)"
  - Axel Hedfors & Dragan Roganovic, remixers (The Temper Trap)

=== Production, surround sound ===
Best Surround Sound Album

- Britten's Orchestra
  - Keith O. Johnson, surround mix engineer; Keith O. Johnson, surround mastering engineer; David Frost, surround producer (Michael Stern & Kansas City Symphony)
- The Incident
  - Steven Wilson, surround mix engineer; Darcy Proper, surround mastering engineer; Steven Wilson, surround producer (Porcupine Tree)
- Parallax Eden
  - David Miles Huber, surround mix engineer; David Miles Huber, surround mastering engineer; David Miles Huber, surround producer (David Miles Huber)
- Songs and Stories (Monster Music Version)
  - Don Murray, surround mix engineer; Sangwook Nam & Doug Sax, surround mastering engineers; John Burk, Noel Lee & Marcus Miller, surround producers (George Benson)
- Trondheimsolistene – In Folk Style
  - Morten Lindberg, surround mix engineer; Morten Lindberg, surround mastering engineer; Morten Lindberg, surround producer (TrondheimSolistene)

=== Production, classical ===
Best Engineered Album, Classical

- Daugherty: Metropolis Symphony; Deus Ex Machina
  - Mark Donahue, John Hill & Dirk Sobotka, engineers (Giancarlo Guerrero & Nashville Symphony Orchestra)
- Have You Ever Been...?
  - Robert Friedrich, engineer (Turtle Island Quartet, Stefon Harris & Mike Marshall)
- Mackey, Steven: Dreamhouse
  - David Frost, Tom Lazarus, Steven Mackey & Dirk Sobotka, engineers (Gil Rose, Rinde Eckert, Catch Electric Guitar Quartet, Synergy Vocals & Boston Modern Orchestra Project)
- Porter, Quincy: Complete Viola Works
  - Leslie Ann Jones, Kory Kruckenberg & David Sabee, engineers (Eliesha Nelson & John McLaughlin Williams)
- Vocabularies
  - Steve Miller, Allen Sides & Roger Treece, engineers (Bobby McFerrin)

Producer Of The Year, Classical

- Blanton Alspaugh
  - Corigliano: Violin Concerto 'The Red Violin' (Michael Ludwig, JoAnn Falletta & Buffalo Philharmonic Orchestra)
  - Daugherty: Metropolis Symphony; Deus Ex Machina (Giancarlo Guerrero & Nashville Symphony)
  - Rachmaninov: Symphony No. 2 (Leonard Slatkin & Detroit Symphony Orchestra)
  - Tower Of The Eight Winds – Music For Violin & Piano By Judith Shatin (Borup-Ernst Duo)
  - Tyberg: Symphony No. 3; Piano Trio (JoAnn Falletta & Buffalo Philharmonic Orchestra)
  - Wind Serenades (Gregory Wolynec & Gateway Chamber Ensemble)
- David Frost
  - Britten's Orchestra (Michael Stern & Kansas City Symphony)
  - Chambers, Evan: The Old Burying Ground (Kenneth Kiesler & The University Of Michigan Symphony Orchestra)
  - Dorman, Avner: Concertos For Mandolin, Piccolo, Piano And Concerto Grosso (Andrew Cyr, Eliran Avni, Mindy Kaufman, Avi Avital & Metropolis Ensemble)
  - The 5 Browns In Hollywood (5 Browns)
  - Mackey, Steven: Dreamhouse (Gil Rose, Rinde Eckert, Catch Electric Guitar Quartet, Synergy Vocals & Boston Modern Orchestra Project)
  - Meeting Of The Spirits (Matt Haimovitz)
  - Two Roads To Exile (ARC Ensemble)
- Tim Handley
  - Adams: Nixon In China (Marin Alsop, Tracy Dahl, Marc Heller, Thomas Hammons, Maria Kanyova, Robert Orth, Chen-Ye Yan, Opera Colorado Chorus & Colorado Symphony Orchestra)
  - Debussy: Le Martyre De Saint Sébastien (Jun Märkl & Orchestre National De Lyon)
  - Dohnányi: Variations On A Nursery Song (JoAnn Falletta, Eldar Nebolsin & Buffalo Philharmonic Orchestra)
  - Harris: Symphonies Nos. 5 & 6 (Marin Alsop & Bournemouth Symphony Orchestra)
  - Hubay: Violin Concertos Nos. 1 And 2 (Chloë Hanslip, Andrew Mogrelia & Bournemouth Symphony Orchestra)
  - Messiaen: Poèmes pour Mi (Anne Schwanewilms, Jun Märkl & Orchestre National De Lyon)
  - Piazzolla: Sinfonía Buenos Aires (Daniel Binelli, Tianwa Yang, Giancarlo Guerro & Nashville Symphony Orchestra)
  - Ries: Works For Flute And Piano (Uwe Grodd & Matteo Napoli)
  - Roussel: Symphony No. 1 (Stéphane Denève & Royal Scottish National Orchestra)
  - Shchedrin: Concertos For Orchestra Nos. 4 & 5 (Kirill Karabits & Bournemouth Symphony Orchestra)
  - Stamitz: Flute Concertos (Robert Aitken, Donatas Katkus & St. Christopher Chamber Orchestra)
  - Strauss, R: Josephs-Legende; Rosenkavalier; Die Frau Ohne Schatten (Orchestral Suites) (JoAnn Falletta & Buffalo Philharmonic Orchestra)
- Marina A. Ledin, Victor Ledin
  - Brubeck: Songs Of Praise (Lynne Morrow, Richard Grant, Quartet San Francisco & The Pacific Mozart Ensemble)
  - Cascade Of Roses (Janice Weber)
  - Gnattali: Solo & Chamber Works For Guitar (Marc Regnier)
  - If I Were A Bird (Michael Lewin)
  - Kletzki: Piano Concerto (Joseph Banowetz, Thomas Sanderling & Russian Philharmonic Orchestra)
  - Porter, Quincy: Complete Viola Works (Eliesha Nelson & John McLaughlin Williams)
  - Rubinstein: Piano Music (1852–1894) (Joseph Banowetz)
  - Rubinstein: Piano Music (1871–1890) (Joseph Banowetz)
  - 20th Century Harp Sonatas (Sarah Schuster Ericsson)
- James Mallinson
  - Mahler: Symphony No. 2 (Bernard Haitink, Duain Wolfe, Miah Persson, Christianne Stotijn, Chicago Symphony Chorus & Chicago Symphony Orchestra)
  - Prokofiev: Romeo And Juliet (Valery Gergiev & London Symphony Orchestra)
  - Shchedrin: The Enchanted Wanderer (Valery Gergiev, Evgeny Akimov, Sergei Aleksashkin, Kristina Kapustinskaya, Mariinsky Chorus & Mariinsky Orchestra)
  - Strauss, R: Ein Heldenleben; Webern: Im Sommerwind (Bernard Haitink & Chicago Symphony Orchestra)
  - Strauss, R: Eine Alpensinfonie (Bernard Haitink & London Symphony Orchestra)
  - Tchaikovsky: Rococo Variations; Prokofiev: Sinfonia Concertante (Gautier Capuçon, Valery Gergiev & Orchestra Of The Mariinsky Theatre)
  - Wagner: Parsifal (Valery Gergiev, Gary Lehman, Violeta Urmana, René Pape, Evgeny Nikitin, Alexei Tanovitski, Nikolai Putilin, Mariinsky Chorus & Mariinsky Orchestra)

=== Classical ===
Best Classical Album

- Bruckner: Symphonies Nos. 3 & 4 – Mariss Jansons, conductor; Everett Porter, producer; Everett Porter, mastering engineer (Royal Concertgebouw Orchestra)
- Daugherty: Metropolis Symphony; Deus Ex Machina – Giancarlo Guerrero, conductor; Blanton Alspaugh, producer; Mark Donahue, John Hill & Dirk Sobotka, engineers/mixers (Terrence Wilson; Nashville Symphony Orchestra)
- Mackey, Steven: Dreamhouse – Gil Rose, conductor; Rinde Eckert; Catch Electric Guitar Quartet; David Frost, producer; David Frost, Tom Lazarus, Steven Mackey & Dirk Sobotka, engineers/mixers; Silas Brown, mastering engineer (Boston Modern Orchestra Project; Synergy Vocals)
- Sacrificium – Giovanni Antonini, conductor; Cecilia Bartoli; Arend Prohmann, producer; Philip Siney, engineer/mixer (Il Giardino Armonico)
- Verdi: Requiem – Riccardo Muti, conductor; Duain Wolfe, chorus master; Christopher Alder, producer; David Frost, Tom Lazarus & Christopher Willis, engineers/mixers (Ildar Abdrazakov, Olga Borodina, Barbara Frittoli & Mario Zeffiri; Chicago Symphony Orchestra; Chicago Symphony Chorus)

Best Orchestral Performance

- Bruckner: "Symphonies Nos. 3 & 4" – Mariss Jansons, conductor (Royal Concertgebouw Orchestra)
- Daugherty: Metropolis Symphony; "Deus Ex Machina" – Giancarlo Guerrero, conductor (Terrence Wilson; Nashville Symphony)
- Mackey, Steven: "Dreamhouse" – Gil Rose, conductor; Rinde Eckert (Catch Electric Guitar Quartet; Boston Modern Orchestra Project; Synergy Vocals)
- Salieri: "Overtures & Stage Music" – Thomas Fey, conductor (Mannheimer Mozartorchester)
- Stravinsky: Pulcinella; Symphony in Three Movements; "Four Études" – Pierre Boulez, conductor (Roxana Constantinescu, Kyle Ketelsen & Nicholas Phan; Chicago Symphony Orchestra)

Best Opera Recording

- Berg: "Lulu"
  - Antonio Pappano, conductor; Agneta Eichenholz, Jennifer Larmore, Klaus Florian Vogt & Michael Volle; David Groves, producer (Orchestra of The Royal Opera House)
- Hasse: "Marc' Antonio E Cleopatra"
  - Matthew Dirst, conductor; Jamie Barton & Ava Pine; Keith Weber, producer (Ars Lyrica Houston)
- Saariaho: "L'Amour de Loin"
  - Kent Nagano, conductor; Daniel Belcher, Ekaterina Lekhina & Marie-Ange Todorovitch; Martin Sauer, producer (Deutsches Symphonie-Orchester Berlin; Rundfunkchor Berlin)
- Shchedrin: "The Enchanted Wanderer"
  - Valery Gergiev, conductor; Evgeny Akimov, Sergei Aleksashkin & Kristina Kapustinskaya; James Mallinson, producer (Orchestra of the Mariinsky Theatre; Chorus of the Mariinsky Theatre)
- Sullivan: "Ivanhoe"
  - David Lloyd-Jones, conductor; Neal Davies, Geraldine McGreevy, James Rutherford, Toby Spence & Janice Watson; Brian Pidgeon, producer (BBC National Orchestra of Wales; Adrian Partington Singers)

Best Choral Performance

- Bach: "Cantatas" – Nikolaus Harnoncourt, conductor; Erwin Ortner, chorus master (Bernarda Fink, Gerald Finley, Christian Gerhaher, Werner Güra, Julia Kleiter, Christine Schäfer, Anton Scharinger & Kurt Streit; Concentus Musicus Wien; Arnold Schoenberg Chor)
- "Baltic Runes" – Paul Hillier, conductor (Estonian Philharmonic Chamber Choir)
- Haydn: "The Creation" – René Jacobs, conductor; Hans-Christoph Rademann, choir director (Julia Kleiter, Maximilian Schmitt & Johannes Weisser; Freiburger Barockorchester; RIAS Kammerchor)
- Martin: "Golgotha" – Daniel Reuss, conductor (Judith Gauthier, Marianne Beate Kielland, Adrian Thompson, Mattijs Van De Woerd & Konstantin Wolff; Estonian National Symphony Orchestra; Cappella Amsterdam & Estonian Philharmonic Chamber Choir)
- Verdi: "Requiem" – Riccardo Muti, conductor; Duain Wolfe, chorus master (Ildar Abdrazakov, Olga Borodina, Barbara Frittoli & Mario Zeffiri; Chicago Symphony Orchestra; Chicago Symphony Chorus)

Best Instrumental Soloist(s) Performance (with Orchestra)

- Daugherty: "Deus Ex Machina" – Giancarlo Guerrero, conductor; Terrence Wilson (Nashville Symphony)
- Dorman, Avner: "Mandolin Concerto" – Andrew Cyr, conductor; Avi Avital (Metropolis Ensemble)
- Kletzki: "Piano Concerto in D Minor, Op. 22" – Thomas Sanderling, conductor; Joseph Banowetz (Russian Philharmonic Orchestra)
- Mozart: "Piano Concertos Nos. 23 & 24" – Mitsuko Uchida (The Cleveland Orchestra)
- Porter, Quincy: "Concerto for Viola & Orchestra" – John McLaughlin Williams, conductor; Eliesha Nelson (Northwest Sinfonia)

Best Instrumental Soloist Performance (without Orchestra)

- Messiaen: "Liver du Saint-Sacrement" - Paul Jacobs
- Chopin: "The Nocturnes" – Nelson Freire
- Hamelin: "Études" – Marc-André Hamelin
- Paganini: "24 Caprices" – Julia Fischer
- "20th Century Harp Sonatas" – Sarah Schuster Ericsson

Best Chamber Music Performance

- Beethoven: "Complete Sonatas for Violin & Piano" – Isabelle Faust and Alexander Melnikov
- Gnattali: "Solo & Chamber Works for Guitar – Marc Regnier" (Tacy Edwards, Natalia Khoma & Marco Sartor)
- Ligeti: "String Quartets Nos. 1 & 2" – Parker Quartet
- Porter, Quincy: "Complete Viola Works" – Eliesha Nelson & John McLaughlin Williams (Douglas Rioth; Northwest Sinfonia)
- Schoenberg: "String Quartets Nos. 3 & 4" – Fred Sherry String Quartet (Christopher Oldfather & Rolf Schulte)

Best Small Ensemble Performance

- "Ceremony and Devotion – Music for the Tudors" – Harry Christophers, conductor; The Sixteen
- "Dinastia Borja" – Jordi Savall, conductor; Hespèrion XXI & La Capella Reial De Catalunya (Pascal Bertin, Daniele Carnovich, Lior Elmalich, Montserrat Figueras, Driss El Maloumi, Marc Mauillon, Lluís Vilamajó & Furio Zanasi; Pascal Bertin, Daniele Carnovich, Josep Piera & Francisco Rojas)
- "Trondheimsolistene – In Folk Style" – Øyvind Gimse & Geir Inge Lotsberg, conductors (Emilia Amper & Gjermund Larsen; TrondheimSolistene)
- "Victoria: Lamentations Of Jeremiah" – Peter Phillips, conductor; The Tallis Scholars
- Whitacre, Eric: "Choral Music" – Noel Edison, conductor; Elora Festival Singers (Carol Bauman & Leslie De'Ath)

Best Classical Vocal Performance

- "Ombre de Mon Amant – French Baroque Arias" – Anne Sofie von Otter (William Christie; Les Arts Florissants)
- "Sacrificium" – Cecilia Bartoli (Giovanni Antonini; Il Giardino Armonico)
- Turina: "Canto A Sevilla" – Lucia Duchonová (Celso Antunes; NDR Radiophilharmonie)
- Vivaldi: "Opera Arias – Pyrotechnics" – Vivica Genaux (Fabio Biondi; Europa Galante)
- Wagner: "Wesendonck-Lieder" – Measha Brueggergosman (Franz Welser-Möst; The Cleveland Orchestra)

Best Classical Contemporary Composition

- "Deus Ex Machina" – Michael Daugherty (Giancarlo Guerrero)
- "Appassionatamente Plus" – Hans Werner Henze (Stefan Soltesz)
- "Graffiti" – Magnus Lindberg (Sakari Oramo)
- "Symphony No. 4" – Arvo Pärt (Esa-Pekka Salonen)
- "The Enchanted Wanderer" – Rodion Shchedrin (Valery Gergiev)

Best Classical Crossover Album

- Meeting of the Spirits – Matt Haimovitz (Amaryllis Jarczyk, Jan Jarczyk, John McLaughlin, Dominic Painchaud, Leanna Rutt & Matt Wilson)
- Off the Map – The Silk Road Ensemble
- Roots – My Life, My Song – Jessye Norman (Ira Coleman, Steve Johns, Mike Lovatt, Mark Markham & Martin Williams)
- Tin, Christopher: Calling All Dawns – Lucas Richman, conductor. Bill Hare & John Kurlander, engineers/mixers. Christopher Tin, producer. (Sussan Deyhim, Lia, Kaori Omura, Dulce Pontes, Jia Ruhan, Aoi Tada & Frederica von Stade; Anonymous 4 & Soweto Gospel Choir; Royal Philharmonic Orchestra)
- Vocabularies – Bobby McFerrin

=== Music video ===
Best Short Form Music Video

- "Bad Romance" – Lady Gaga
  - Francis Lawrence, video director; Heather Heller, Kathy Angstadt, Nicole Ehrlich video producers
- "Ain't No Grave" – (Johnny Cash)
  - Chris Milk, video director; Jennifer Heath, Aaron Koblin & Rick Rubin, video producers
- "Love the Way You Lie" – Eminem & Rihanna
  - Joseph Kahn, video director; MaryAnn Tanedo, video producer
- "Stylo" – Gorillaz, Mos Def & Bobby Womack
  - Pete Candeland & Jamie Hewlett, video directors; Cara Speller, video producer
- "Fuck You" – Cee Lo Green
  - Matt Stawski, video director; Paul Bock, video producer

Best Long Form Music Video

- When You're Strange – The Doors
  - Tom Dicillo, video director; John Beug, Jeff Jampol, Peter Jankowski & Dick Wolf, video producers
- No Distance Left to Run – Blur
  - Will Lovelace, Dylan Southern & Giorgio Testi, video directors; Thomas Benski, Laura Collins & Lucas Ochoa, video producers
- The Greatest Ears in Town: The Arif Mardin Story – Arif Mardin
  - Doug Biro & Joe Mardin, video directors; Doug Biro & Joe Mardin, video producers
- Rush: Beyond the Lighted Stage – Rush
  - Sam Dunn & Scot McFadyen, video directors; Sam Dunn & Scot McFadyen, video producers
- Under Great White Northern Lights – The White Stripes
  - Emmett Malloy, video director; Ian Montone & Mike Sarkissian, video producers

== Special Merit Awards ==
=== MusiCares Person of the Year ===
- Barbra Streisand

=== President's Merit Award ===
- David Geffen

=== Lifetime Achievement Award ===
- Julie Andrews
- Roy Haynes
- Juilliard String Quartet
- The Kingston Trio
- Dolly Parton
- Ramones
- George Beverly Shea

=== Trustees Award ===
- Al Bell
- Wilma Cozart Fine
- Bruce Lundvall

=== Technical Grammy Award ===
- Roger Linn

== Artists with multiple nominations and awards ==
The following artists received multiple nominations:

- Ten: Eminem
- Seven: Bruno Mars
- Six: Jay-Z, Lady Antebellum, and Lady Gaga
- Five: Jeff Beck, B.o.B, David Frost, Philip Lawrence, John Legend and The Roots
- Four: Alex da Kid, The Black Keys, Drake, Cee Lo Green, Ari Levine, Katy Perry, Rihanna, Dirk Sobotka and Zac Brown
- Three: Damon Albarn, Arcade Fire, Beyoncé, Chris Brown, David Frost, Alicia Keys, Miranda Lambert, John Mayer, Muse and Neil Young
- Two: Justin Bieber, Michael Bublé, Matt Cameron, Kristin Chenoweth, Fantasia, Glee Cast, Goldfrapp La Roux, Mumford & Sons, Monica, Usher, Janelle Monáe, Pink, Robert Plant, Sade, Hayley Williams, and The White Stripes

The following artists received multiple awards:

- Five: Lady Antebellum
- Three: David Frost, Jay-Z, John Legend, Jeff Beck and Lady Gaga
- Two: The Black Keys, Eminem, Herbie Hancock, Alicia Keys, The Roots, Usher, Christopher Tin and BeBe Winans

== In Memoriam ==
James Moody, John D. Kendall, Billy Taylor, Herb Ellis, Lena Horne, Margaret Whiting, Charlie Louvin, Hank Cochran, Carl Smith, Bobby Charles, Bobby Hebb, Gladys Horton, Teena Marie, General Johnson, Gregory Isaacs, Sugar Minott, Harvey Fuqua, Garry Shider, Dick Griffey, Gerry Rafferty, George David Weiss, Wally Traugott, Jim Williamson, Bill Porter, Richie Hayward, Ben Keith, Captain Beefheart, Malcolm McLaren, Herman Leonard, Irwin Silber, Jim Marshall, Jerry Bock, Allyn Ferguson, John Barry, Peter Lopez, Caresse Henry, Bill Aucoin, Hal Uplinger, Ron Baird, Ronni Chasen, Mitch Miller, Roberto Cantoral, Olga Guillot, Enrique Morente, Joan Sutherland, Helen Boatwright, Margaret Price, Earl Wild, Raphael Hillyer, Ronnie James Dio, Doug Fieger, Don Kirshner, Esteban "Steve" Jordan, Tony "Ham" Guerrero, Eddie Fisher, Jimmy Dean, Alex Chilton, Walter Hawkins, Albertina Walker and Solomon Burke.
