= Come Alive (The War of the Roses) =

Promotional single by Janelle Monáe

from the album The ArchAndroid
- Released: September 29, 2009
- Recorded: 2009
- Studio: Wondaland (Atlanta, Georgia, US)
- Genre: Rock and roll
- Length: 3:22
- Label: Wondaland Arts Society; Bad Boy
- Songwriters: Janelle Monáe; Charles Joseph II; Nathaniel Irvin III; Kellis Parker Jr.
- Producers: Nate "Rocket" Wonder; Chuck Lightning; Janelle Monáe

"Come Alive (The War of the Roses)" is a song by American singer Janelle Monáe. It was released as a free digital download in September 2009 as a promotional song for Kia Motors' Kia Soul Collective project, and was the first song announced from Monáe's debut studio album The ArchAndroid (2010). Critics praised Monáe's vocal range and delivery of the song, as well as a mix of genres such as rock and roll and new wave. Monáe often performs the song as the closer to her live performances.

== Promotion and release ==
In 2009, Janelle Monáe was announced as a member of the Kia Soul Collective project, a collective of artists promoting the Kia Soul crossover vehicle. "Come Alive (The War of the Roses)" was unveiled on September 29, 2009, as a free digital download on the promotion's website. The website also showed behind-the-scenes recordings of the song at Wondaland Art Society (where Monáe also described her respect for James Brown's delivery and performance).

Atlanta-based digital content creators Ideas United uploaded a video of Monáe filming a music video for "Come Alive (The War of the Roses)" at the Palace of the Dogs (a location where the video for her single "Tightrope" (2010) was filmed.) The music video (called an "emotion picture") depicted Monáe as Patient 57821 at a medical facility, where she rebels against the doctors who forcibly collect "imaginations" from the patients. The completed video was never officially released.

As a part of the Kia Soul Collective promotions, Kia Motors held a series of free concerts, one of which featured Fool's Gold and Monáe in West Hollywood, California, on November 7, 2009.

== Live performances ==
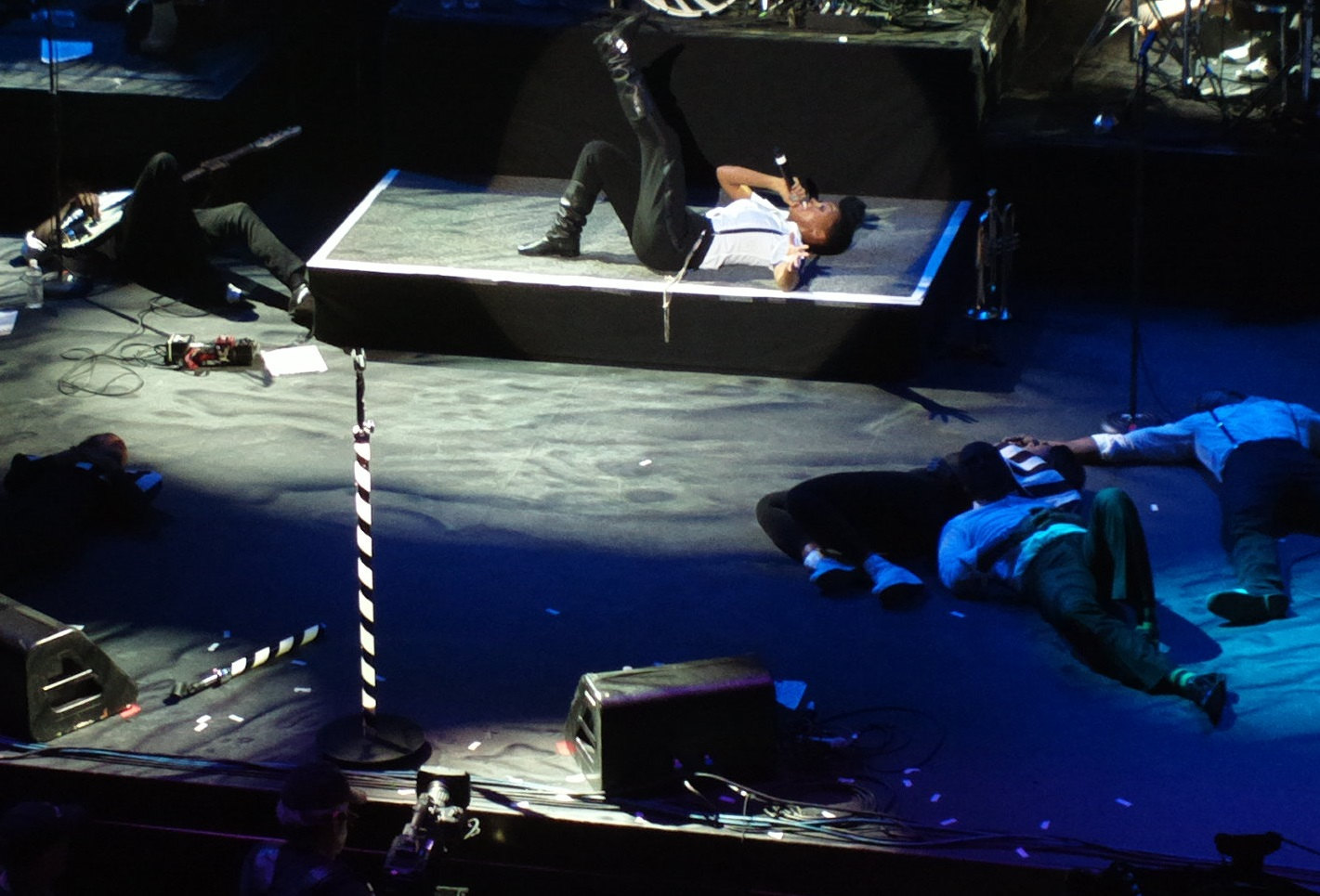
Janelle Monáe and her band members performing "Come Alive" lying down (2012).

"Come Alive (The War of the Roses)" has been performed as a final song or during the encore Monáe's ArchAndroid Tour (2010), Hooligans in Wondaland Tour (2011) and The Electric Lady Tour (2013), as well as multiple festival performances such as Glastonbury Festival 2011. Monáe performs the song as a 10-minute extended version, incorporating call and response. During the performances, Monáe and her band members lie down on the stage, and Monáe asks the audience to lie down as well. The band and Monáe continue to sing the song while they are on lying on the stage. Critics such as Dan Meade of The Manic American have praised Monáe's "commanding" stage presence during performances of "Come Alive", while others have praised how high energy Monáe's performance is. In 2020, Monáe performed a version of the song to open the 92nd Academy Awards ceremony, with the lyrics modified to reference the event.

== Critical reception ==
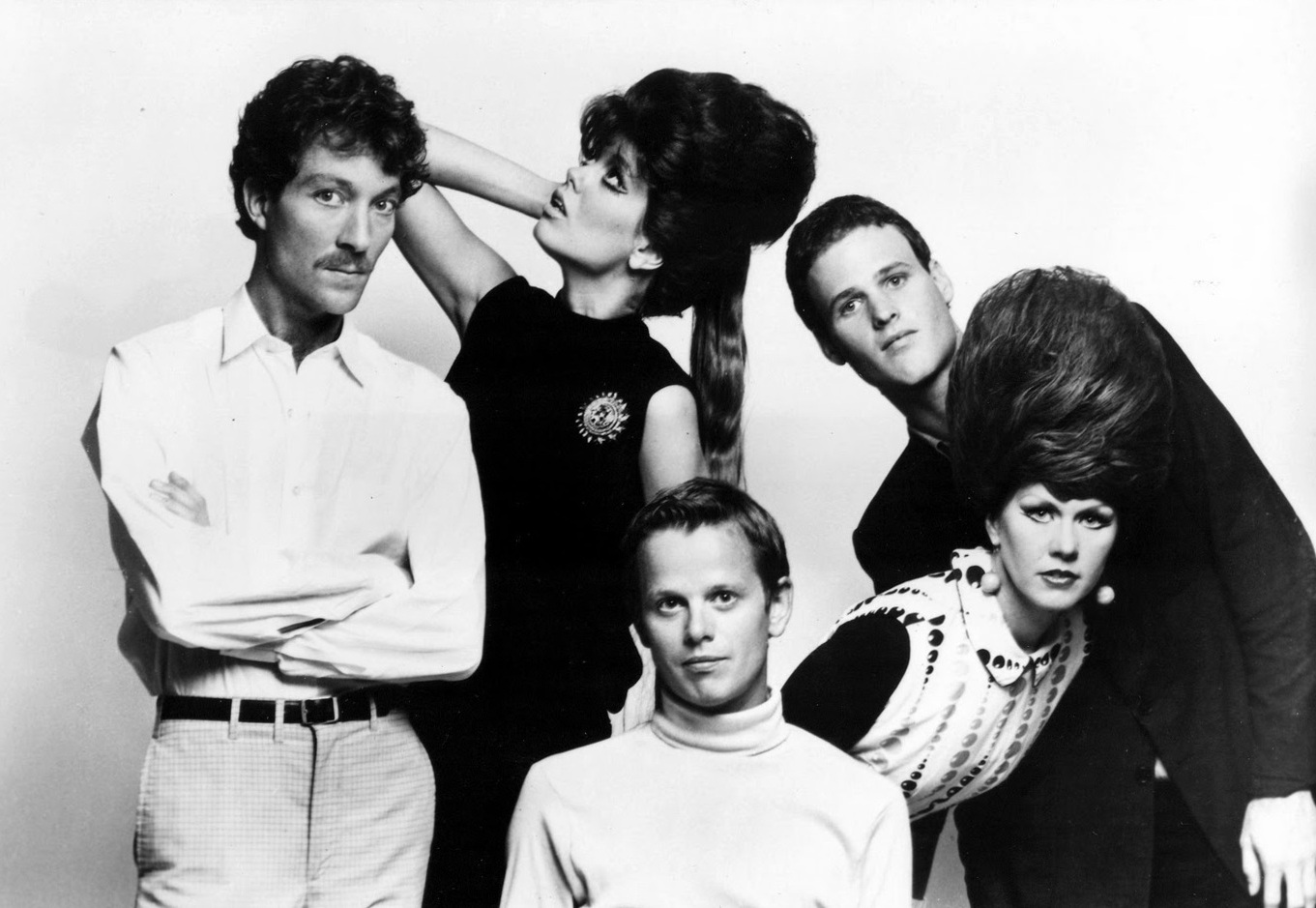
Critics likened "Come Alive (The War of the Roses)"'s bassline to "Rock Lobster" (1978) by the B-52's (pictured).

"Come Alive (The War of the Roses)" was positively received by music critics. Bradley Stern of MuuMuse praised the song as "smart, it's solid, and it's way, way out of control", and praised Monáe's vocal delivery. Arjan Timmermans described the song as "a straight up, classic rock 'n roll gem with Monae grooving and hollering in her own unique way", while Pretty Much Amazing called the song a "complete win", describing the song as an "overpowering, almost frightening rock 'n' roll number".

Critics noted the song's bassline's similarity to the B-52's's "Rock Lobster" (1978), but also likened the song to the works of Tina Turner, Janis Joplin, James Brown and the Violent Femmes' "Blister in the Sun" (1983). Monáe's vocal range and delivery in the song were praised, as well as the mix of genres such as rock, swing music and new wave.

In 2015, music review blog Live in Limbo contributor Andreas Babiolakis named "Come Alive (The War of the Roses)" the 17th best song released in the past five years, calling it one of the more unappreciated songs from The ArchAndroid.

== Credits and personnel ==
Credits adapted from the liner notes of The ArchAndroid, Wondaland Arts Society, in association with Bad Boy Records.

Technical

- Janelle Monáe – lead vocals, writing, production, lyrics, background vocals
- Nathaniel Irvin III – production, composition, arrangement, background vocals
- Charles Joseph II – production, lyrics
- Kellindo Parker – additional arrangement
- Roman GianArthur – additional vocal arrangement

Recording, mastering and editing

- Recorded by Control Z and Roman GianArthur at Wondaland Studios in Atlanta, Georgia
- Mixing by Nate "Rocket" Wonder & Roman GianArthur at Wondaland Studios and Chris Carmouche at Farmhouse Recording Studio in Atlanta, Georgia
- Mastered by Larry Anthony at CO5 Mastering in Atlanta, Georgia

Instruments

- Kellindo Parker - Rhythm, lead & solo guitar
- Nathaniel Irvin III - bass guitar
- Terrance Brown - organ
