= The ArchAndroid =

Studio album by Janelle Monáe
- Released: May 18, 2010
- Studios: Wondaland, Atlanta, Georgia
- Genres: Progressive soul; alternative R&B; psychedelic pop; psychedelic soul
- Length: 68:35
- Labels: Wondaland Arts Society; Bad Boy; Atlantic
- Producers: Chuck Lightning; Janelle Monáe; Kevin Barnes; Nate "Rocket" Wonder; Roman GianArthur

Janelle Monáe chronology
| Metropolis: The Chase Suite (2007) | The ArchAndroid (2010) | The Electric Lady (2013) |

Singles from The ArchAndroid
- 1. "Tightrope" Released: February 11, 2010; 2. "Cold War" Released: August 8, 2010

The ArchAndroid is the debut studio album by American singer and songwriter Janelle Monáe, released on May 18, 2010, by Wondaland Arts Society, Bad Boy Records, and Atlantic Records. Production for the album took place at Wondaland Studios in Atlanta and was primarily handled by Monáe, Nate "Rocket" Wonder, and Chuck Lightning, with only one song without production by Monáe. She also collaborated for certain songs with Saul Williams, Big Boi, of Montreal, and Deep Cotton.

The album is composed of the second and third parts to Monáe's Metropolis concept album series. Incorporating conceptual elements of Afrofuturism and science fiction, The ArchAndroid continues the series' fictional tale of a messianic android and features lyrical themes of love, identity, and self-realization. Critical commentaries have compared the album to the works of David Bowie, Outkast, Prince and Michael Jackson.

The ArchAndroid debuted at number 17 on the US Billboard 200, selling 21,000 copies in its first week, while charting modestly in several other countries. Monáe promoted the album with the release of two singles – "Tightrope" and "Cold War" – and concert tours in 2010 and 2011. A widespread critical success, The ArchAndroid received praise for its thematic concepts and Monáe's eclectic musical range. It later ranked among 2010's best albums in many critics' lists and earned the singer a Grammy Award nomination for Best Contemporary R&B Album.

== Writing and recording ==
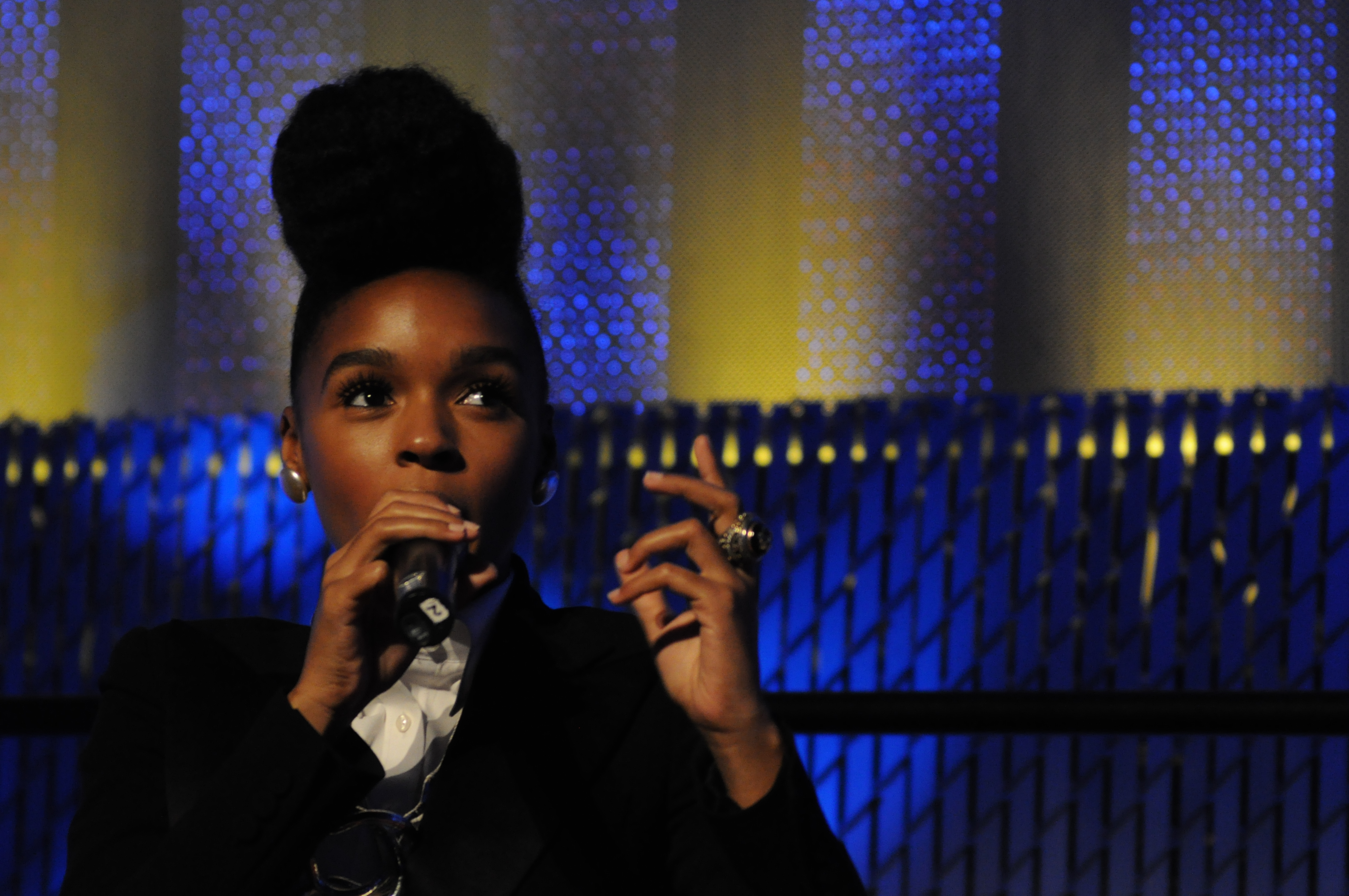
Monáe discussing the album at the 2010 Pop Conference

The ArchAndroid follows Janelle Monáe's debut EP Metropolis: The Chase Suite (2007) and is composed as the second and third parts to her Metropolis concept series. Partly inspired by the 1927 film of the same name, the series involves the fictional tale of Cindi Mayweather, a messianic android sent back in time to free the citizens of Metropolis from The Great Divide, a secret society that uses time travel to suppress freedom and love.

In an interview for the Chicago Tribune, Monáe said that she drew inspiration for the album from the quotation, "The mediator between the hand and the mind is always the heart". She explained her incorporation of the android as a metaphor for the minority, in addition to being the role of the story's protagonist. In an interview for Blues & Soul, Monáe said the character "represents the mediator between the haves and the have-nots, the minority and the majority. So in that way she's very similar to Neo, the Archangel from 'The Matrix'. And basically her return will mean freedom for the android community".

Monáe has said about the recording sessions, "Over the last year and a half when we were recording the ArchAndroid I went through a very transformative period in my life". Monáe completed the album in Atlanta at the Wondaland Studios. Monáe has stated that the album signifies "breaking the chains that enslave minorities of all types". She has said of recording the album, "Overall, this music came from various corners of the world—from Turkey to Prague to Atlanta—places we were on tour. While recording, we’d experiment with different sounds. Once we became engulfed in the sound, we all had an emotional connection to the album. It has definitely transformed my way of thinking, the way that I approach the stage and overall, my life".

== Music and lyrics ==
Monáe has stated that the album's musical influences encompass "all the things I love, scores for films like Goldfinger mixed with albums like Stevie Wonder's Music of My Mind and David Bowie's Ziggy Stardust, along with experimental hip hop influences from albums such as Outkast's Stankonia". Huw Jones of Slant Magazine described her sound as "a unique gray area between neo soul, funk, and art rock". Music writer Greg Kot stated that the album "touches on" musical genres such as funk, hip hop, folk, electro-pop, glam rock, big-band jazz, rock and classical music.

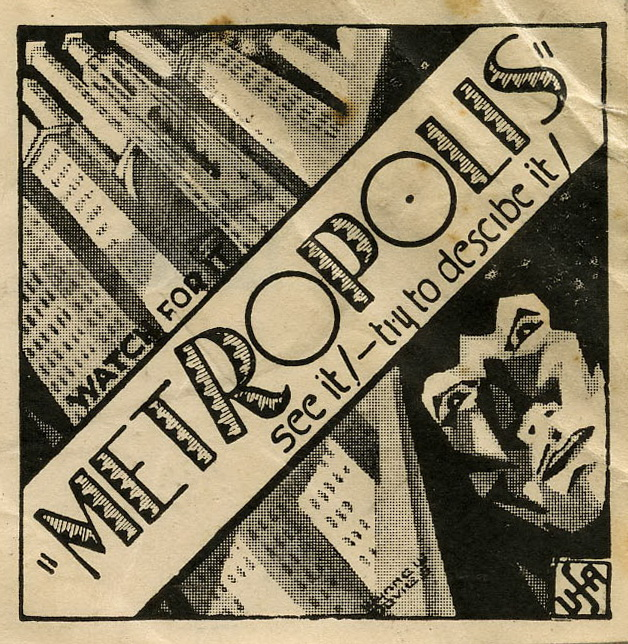
Advertisement for the 1927 film Metropolis; the album draws heavily on the film's futuristic themes.

Monáe has stated that the album's lyrical themes and storyline were heavily influenced by Fritz Lang's Metropolis. Conceptually, Kot described the album as "a self-empowerment manifesto couched inside a futuristic 'emotion-picture' about an android’s battle to overcome oppression. The notion of space travel and 'new worlds' becomes a metaphor for breaking the chains that enslave minorities of all types – a theme that has a long tradition in African-American music, from Sun Ra and Parliament-Funkadelic to Cannibal Ox and OutKast". The Atlantic's Brentin Mock called The ArchAndroid "unique, forward-looking, and apoplectic... something of a jitterbug between Prince's 1986 movie Under the Cherry Moon and the 1977 Watts movie Killer of Sheep, and Daughters of the Dust". Seth Colter Walls of Newsweek described the album as "rocking in parts like Dirty Mind–era Prince, unfolding in a suite form that recalls Abbey Road's side two, and bumping throughout with the best innovations of contemporary hip-hop".

The opening song "Dance or Die" features performer Saul Williams and contains neo soul influences. It then transitions into "Faster", which has new wave, gospel and retro pop influences. The song "Locked Inside" features a rhythm similar to the opening break from "Rock with You" by Michael Jackson, and it has been compared to Jackson's music with Quincy Jones. It has also been noted for similarities to artists such as Estelle and The Jackson 5. The track features a more mellow R&B style in contrast to the previous tracks. "Sir Greendown" continues with this theme and has "old-fashioned" pop themes. The track "Cold War" is a song with new wave tendencies which has big hooks and "sugar fuelled" beat influences.

The track "Tightrope", featuring vocals by Big Boi (from the hip hop duo Outkast), has influences from the duo's single "Hey Ya!" (2003) and a sound described as "funky soul" and neojump blues. The album's ninth track is "Oh, Maker", a song with English pastoral folk influences. "Come Alive (The War of the Roses)" has been described as having rock and punk themes. "Mushrooms & Roses" is the next track on the album and it has themes of psychedelic music and it has influences by such songs as The Beatles' "Strawberry Fields Forever" and Prince's "Purple Rain". The next track, "Make the Bus", features of Montreal on vocal parts and it has been compared to such artists as Placebo and George Clinton. The song "Wondaland" has a synth-pop sound and has been compared to the work of Tom Tom Club. Deep Cotton guest-stars on the song "57821" which has been described as "space-folk" and has been compared to works by Simon & Garfunkel. This is followed by the track "Say You'll Go" and features a segment from "Clair de lune" by Claude Debussy.

== Marketing and sales ==
In late September 2009, "Come Alive (The War of the Roses)" was released as a free promotional single by Kia Motors, which featured Monáe as a member of their "Kia Soul Collective" of musicians and artists. "Tightrope" (featuring Big Boi) was released as The ArchAndroid's lead single on February 11, 2010, through Pitchfork's website, with a companion song entitled "Cold War" debuting the following day via Monáe's official website. On March 31, the video for "Tightrope" was released presenting Monáe dancing in the Palace of the Dogs also starring Big Boi. Monáe performed the song on the Late Show with David Letterman on May 18, 2010, The Ellen DeGeneres Show on May 26, Lopez Tonight on May 27, Last Call with Carson Daly on May 28, and The Mo'Nique Show on June 9. Rolling Stone later named "Tightrope" as the eighth best single of 2010.

To promote the album, Monáe hosted a listening session for press and VIPs at Rubin Museum of Art in New York City on March 4, 2010. A short film, teaser trailer style, was released on April 14 on YouTube showing an aerial view of the fictional futuristic city of Metropolis. Monáe also performed at the 2010 ESPY Awards (joined on stage by comedian Will Ferrell), Later... with Jools Holland (where she performed the album-track "Faster"), and Last Call with Carson Daly (where she performed "Cold War").

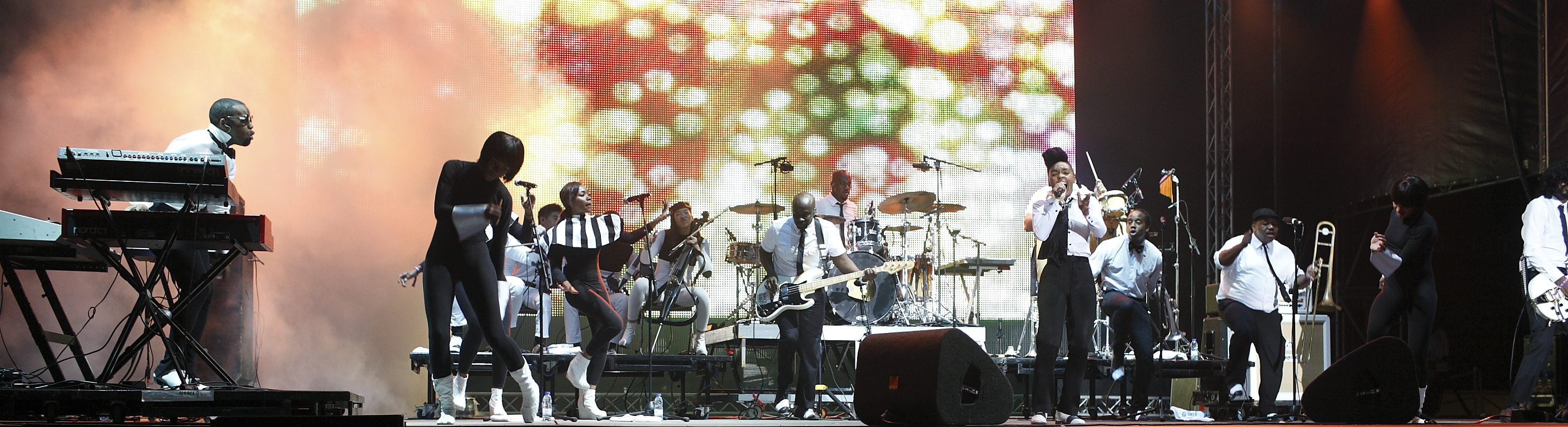
Monáe performing with her band at the 2011 Sudoeste Festival

The ArchAndroid was released on May 18, 2010, through Wondaland Arts Society and Bad Boy Records. In the week of June 5, it debuted at number 17 on the US Billboard 200 chart, selling 21,000 copies. During the week of February 23, 2011, the album re-entered the Billboard 200 at number 171, after selling 3,000 copies that week. In the United Kingdom, The ArchAndroid debuted at number 51 on the UK Albums Chart.

Monáe toured in further support of the album. She joined recording artist Erykah Badu on the latter's Out My Mind, Just in Time Tour during May to June 2010. In February 2011, Hooligans in Wondaland [sic] – a joint co-headlining tour by Monáe with Bruno Mars – was announced. The concert tour featured dates throughout North America from May to June. Monáe also toured as a supporting act for No Doubt and Paramore.

== Critical reception ==
The ArchAndroid ratings
Aggregate scores
| Source | Rating |
|---|---|
| AnyDecentMusic? | 8.5/10 |
| Metacritic | 91/100 |
Review scores
| Source | Rating |
| AllMusic | 5/5 stars |
| The A.V. Club | A− |
| Chicago Tribune | 4/4 stars |
| Entertainment Weekly | A− |
| The Guardian | 5/5 stars |
| Los Angeles Times | 3.5/4 stars |
| NME | 8/10 |
| Pitchfork | 8.5/10 |
| Rolling Stone | 3.5/5 stars |
| Spin | 9/10 |

The ArchAndroid was met with widespread critical acclaim. At Metacritic, which assigns a normalized rating out of 100 to reviews from professional publications, the album received an average score of 91, based on 28 reviews. One of 2010's best-reviewed releases, the album received praise for its Afrofuturistic concept and Monáe's eclectic musical range.

Reviewing for the Chicago Tribune, Greg Kot hailed The ArchAndroid as "an audacious, sometimes bewildering statement", and AllMusic critic Andy Kellman called it "an extravagant 70-minute album involving more imagination, conceptual detail, and stylistic turnabouts than most gatefold prog rock epics". The Guardian's Michael Cragg found the "sheer musical scope" of the album "spellbinding", while Barry Walters of Spin noted German Expressionism and Afrofuturism as conceptual elements on an album wherein Monáe ventures "so far away from soul that she's come back around to it". Jon Pareles from The New York Times remarked that "Monáe gets away with most of her metamorphoses, and the sheer ambition is exhilarating even when she stretches too far". Matthew Cole from Slant Magazine described it as "an elaborately performed and consummately freaky cyberpunk epic ... so stylistically leftfield in terms of its sound". The A.V. Club's Genevieve Koski wrote that "Monáe’s inexhaustible swagger and singular style sell both the high-concept theatrics and the schizophrenic sonics". Pitchfork's Matthew Perpetua called the album "about as bold as mainstream music gets, marrying the world-building possibilities of the concept album to the big tent genre-mutating pop of Michael Jackson and Prince in their prime". Perpetua elaborated on Monáe's incorporation of science-fiction and Afrofuturist concepts and the album's "basic appeal", stating:

Her imagination and iconography deepen the record as an experience and give her license to go far out, but it ultimately serves as a fun, flashy framework for pop songs with universal lyrical sentiments. The first of the two suites mainly deals with identity and self-realization; the second is essentially a set of love songs. As with all the musical genres blended into The ArchAndroid, Monáe uses the conventions of science fiction as a means of communication, tapping into mythic archetypes for their immediate resonance and power. And where many concept albums run a high risk of being pompous, cryptic, and self-important, Monáe keeps things playful, lively, and accessible. It's a delicate balancing act ... resulting in an eccentric breakthrough that transcends its novelty.

Urb's Dan Vidal called the album "a spectrum of sound—packed and arranged perfectly into a masterfully composed (debut) full-length body of work... [a] genre-defying masterpiece". Comparing it to singer Janet Jackson's Rhythm Nation 1814 (1989), Brentin Mock of The Atlantic called The ArchAndroid "a smothered funk, though perhaps at times too thick, too inaccessible, but not so much I didn't want to shake my ass" and viewed it as musically progressive, stating "Monáe has given pop music its first Toni Morrison moment, where fantasy, funk, and the ancestors come together for an experience that evolves one's soul... You really don't know whether you want to diagram it, dance to it, or just be dumbstruck. It owes as much to Parliament-Funkadelic as it does to Samuel R. Delany and Octavia E. Butler. She is finally doing what a number of artists—particularly black artists—have not been able to do in years, and that's move pop music forward". Robert Christgau was less impressed in The Barnes & Noble Review, deeming it "the most overrated album of the year" while writing that Monáe's "songwriting is 60th percentile, her singing technical, her sci-fi plot the usual rot".

=== Accolades ===
The ArchAndroid appeared on many year-end critics lists ranking the best albums of 2010. It topped lists by several publications, including PopMatters, the Chicago Tribune, and The Guardian, which published the following assessment: "No other album this year seems so alive with possibility. Monáe is young and fearless enough to try anything, gifted enough to pull almost all of it off, and large-hearted enough to make it feel like a communal experience: Us rather than Me". In other year-end lists, The ArchAndroid placed second (Paste), fifth (Vibe's Chris Yuscavage), sixth (Nitsuh Abebe of New York and Spin), eighth (MTV and Entertainment Weekly), and 21st (NME). In ranking it number 12, Pitchfork called it a "hugely ambitious full-length debut—more Sign o' the Times than Kid A". The publication also included the album at number 116 on a list ranking the best from the 2010s decade.

In The Village Voice's annual Pazz & Jop critics poll, The ArchAndroid was voted the fourth best album of 2010, while five of its songs appeared in the poll's singles list: "Tightrope" (number two), "Cold War" (number 22), "Wondaland", "Locked Inside", and "Sir Greendown" (the latter three tied for number 549). Additionally, The ArchAndroid was nominated for a Grammy Award in the category of Best Contemporary R&B Album for the 53rd Annual Grammy Awards (2011). The album later featured in the book 1001 Albums You Must Hear Before You Die (2014).

== Track listing ==
All tracks produced by Nate "Rocket" Wonder, Chuck Lightning, and Janelle Monáe, except track 14 by Kevin Barnes and tracks 1, 12, and 18 by Roman GianArthur.

Suite II
| No. | Title | Writer(s) | Length |
|---|---|---|---|
| 1. | "Suite II Overture" | Janelle Monáe Robinson; Roman GianArthur; Nathaniel Irvin III; Charles Joseph II | 2:31 |
| 2. | "Dance or Die" (featuring Saul Williams) | Robinson; Irvin III; Joseph II; Saul Williams; Kellis Parker Jr. | 3:12 |
| 3. | "Faster" | Robinson; Irvin III; Joseph II | 3:19 |
| 4. | "Locked Inside" | Robinson; Irvin III | 4:16 |
| 5. | "Sir Greendown" | Robinson; Irvin III; Joseph II | 2:14 |
| 6. | "Cold War" | Robinson; Irvin III; Joseph II | 3:23 |
| 7. | "Tightrope" (featuring Big Boi) | Robinson; Irvin III; Joseph II; Antwan Patton | 4:22 |
| 8. | "Neon Gumbo" | Irvin III; Robinson; Joseph II | 1:37 |
| 9. | "Oh, Maker" | Robinson; Irvin III; Joseph II | 3:46 |
| 10. | "Come Alive (The War of the Roses)" | Robinson; Joseph II; Irvin III; Parker Jr. | 3:22 |
| 11. | "Mushrooms & Roses" | Robinson; Irvin III; Joseph II; Parker Jr. | 5:42 |

Suite III
| No. | Title | Writer(s) | Length |
|---|---|---|---|
| 12. | "Suite III Overture" | Robinson; Irvin; Irvin III; Joseph II | 1:41 |
| 13. | "Neon Valley Street" | Robinson; Irvin III; Joseph II; Richard Rodgers; Lorenz Hart | 4:11 |
| 14. | "Make the Bus" (featuring of Montreal) | Kevin Barnes | 3:19 |
| 15. | "Wondaland" | Robinson; Irvin III; Joseph II | 3:36 |
| 16. | "57821" (featuring Deep Cotton) | Robinson; Irvin III; Joseph II | 3:16 |
| 17. | "Say You'll Go" | Robinson; Irvin; Irvin III; Joseph II | 6:01 |
| 18. | "BabopbyeYa" | Robinson; Irvin; Irvin II; Irvin III; Joseph II | 8:47 |

Australian tour edition (bonus tracks) (from Metropolis: The Chase Suite (Special Edition))
| No. | Title | Writer(s) | Length |
|---|---|---|---|
| 19. | "The March of the Wolfmasters" | Joseph II; Irvin III | 1:27 |
| 20. | "Violet Stars Happy Hunting!!!" (featuring The Skunks) | Robinson; Joseph II; Irvin III | 3:13 |
| 21. | "Many Moons" | Robinson; Joseph II; Irvin III | 5:34 |
| 22. | "Cybertronic Purgatory" | Robinson; Joseph II; Irvin III | 1:40 |
| 23. | "Sincerely, Jane." | Robinson; Joseph II; Irvin III | 5:36 |
| 24. | "Mr. President" | Robinson; Joseph II; Irvin III | 4:59 |
| 25. | "Smile" | Charlie Chaplin; Geoffrey Parsons; John Turner | 3:58 |

== Personnel ==
Information is taken from AllMusic.

=== Musicians ===
- Young Pete Alexander – drums, string arrangements
- Kevin Barnes – synthesizer, drums, guitar (bass), keyboards, vocals, vocals (background), producer, drum programming
- Terrence Brown – organ, piano
- Deep Cotton – vocals (background)
- DJ Cutmaster Swiff – scratching, cut
- Jason Freeman – horn arrangements
- Jerry Freeman – horn arrangements
- Roman GianArthur – percussion, piano, arranger, conductor, vocals (background), producer, engineer, vocal arrangement, string arrangements, mixing
- Hornz Unlimited – horn
- Felicia Long – flute
- Janelle Monáe – arranger, vocals, vocals (background), producer
- The Neon Valley St. Anthony Choir – vocals (background)
- The Neon Valley Street Chancel Choir – vocals (background)
- Monroe Nervine – dulcimer, clarinet, mandolin, bassoon, harp, oboe
- Tang Nivri – percussion
- Kyle O'Brien – french horn
- Alexander Page – violin, viola
- Kellindo Parker – arranger, ukulele, guitar, guitar (rhythm), vocal arrangement, soloist
- Grace Shim – cello
- Kellis Parker – guitar arrangements
- Skinks – vocals (background)
- The Skunks – vocals (background)
- Dashill "Sunnovah" Smith – trumpet, soloist
- Kelly Sparker – brass
- Thesaurus Rex – harp
- Saul Williams – vocals
- Wolfmaster Z – drums, guitar (bass), guitar (rhythm), theremin, tubular bells, bass marimba
- The Wondaland ArchOrchestra – strings
- Wondaland String Ensemble – strings
- Nate "Rocket" Wonder – organ, guitar (acoustic), bass, guitar, percussion, arranger, conductor, drums, guitar (bass), guitar (electric), keyboards, vocals, vocals (background), producer, mellotron, vibraphone, horn arrangements, string arrangements, editing, mixing, Hammond B3
- Nathan Yelurvin – percussion, glockenspiel, harp, Mellotron, woodwind

=== Production ===
- Larry Anthony – mastering
- Christopher Carmouche – mixing
- Jessee Clarkson – wardrobe
- Sean "Diddy" Combs – executive producer
- Control Z – engineer, mastering, mixing
- Nate "Rocket" Wonder – arranger
- Jeff Gillies – wardrobe
- Dr. Nathaniel Irvin III – arranger
- Charles Joseph II – arranger
- Damien Lewis – engineer, editing
- Chuck Lightning – arranger, vocals (background), producer
- Lord Mitchell A. "MitchOW!ski" Martian – mastering, mixing
- Antwan "Big Boi" Patton – executive producer, vocals (background)
- Max Stellings – liner notes
- Phil Tan – editing, mixing
- Carolyn Tracey – package production
- Chad Weatherford – costume design
- Andrew Zaeh – photography

== Charts ==
=== Weekly charts ===
Chart performance for The ArchAndroid
| Chart (2010–2011) | Peak position |
|---|---|
| Austrian Albums (Ö3 Austria) | 63 |
| Belgian Albums (Ultratop Flanders) | 57 |
| Danish Albums (Hitlisten) | 15 |
| Dutch Albums (Album Top 100) | 65 |
| Finnish Albums (Suomen virallinen lista) | 47 |
| French Albums (SNEP) | 155 |
| German Albums (Offizielle Top 100) | 12 |
| Irish Albums (IRMA) | 24 |
| Norwegian Albums (VG-lista) | 22 |
| Spanish Albums (Promusicae) | 100 |
| Swiss Albums (Schweizer Hitparade) | 36 |
| UK Albums (Official Charts) | 51 |
| UK R&B Albums (Official Charts) | 11 |
| US Billboard 200 | 17 |
| US Top R&B/Hip-Hop Albums (Billboard) | 4 |

=== Year-end charts ===
2010 year-end chart performance for The ArchAndroid
| Chart (2010) | Position |
|---|---|
| US Top R&B/Hip-Hop Albums (Billboard) | 59 |

== Certifications ==
Certifications for The ArchAndroid
| Region | Certification | Certified units/sales |
|---|---|---|
| United Kingdom (BPI) | Silver | 60,000^{‡} |
^{‡} Sales+streaming figures based on certification alone.
