= Judy Pancoast =

American singer and songwriter of children's music

- Born: 1959 (age 65–66); Waterville, Maine, U.S.
- Origin: West Haven, Connecticut, U.S.
- Genres: Children's music, Novelty
- Occupation(s): Singer, songwriter, composer, poet, performer
- Years active: 1980–present
- Labels: Mamanook Music

Judy Pancoast (born 1959), is an American singer, songwriter, and composer of children's music. She was nominated for the Best Children's Album at the 53rd Annual Grammy Awards and uses themes of Maine, where she was born, in addition to humorous lyrics which gained her a fanbase in households, and she also performs for children and families.

== Biography and career ==
She was born and raised in Waterville, Maine, went to college at University of Maine. She later got a master's degree in University of New Hampshire and performed at preschools and kindergartens. According to a press release in New Hampshire Union Leader, she was inspired by The Carpenters and met Richard a concert.

She then released her debut song and single, “The House on Christmas Street” which was released in 1998. She co-wrote a song titled "Good Girl" and Kasey Lansdale released it.

In 2003, she released her debut album "Swimming in Jello" and later in 2005 she released two more albums which were "The Tune Room" and "Are We There Yet".

In 2011, her album, Weird Things Are Everywhere! was nominated for the Best Children's Album at the 53rd Annual Grammy Awards.

== Discography ==
Albums

- Swimming in Jello (2003)
- The Tune Room (2005)
- Are We There Yet (2005)
- Weird Things Are Everywhere! (2011)
