= Pierre Cossette (producer) =

Canadian television executive producer and Broadway producer

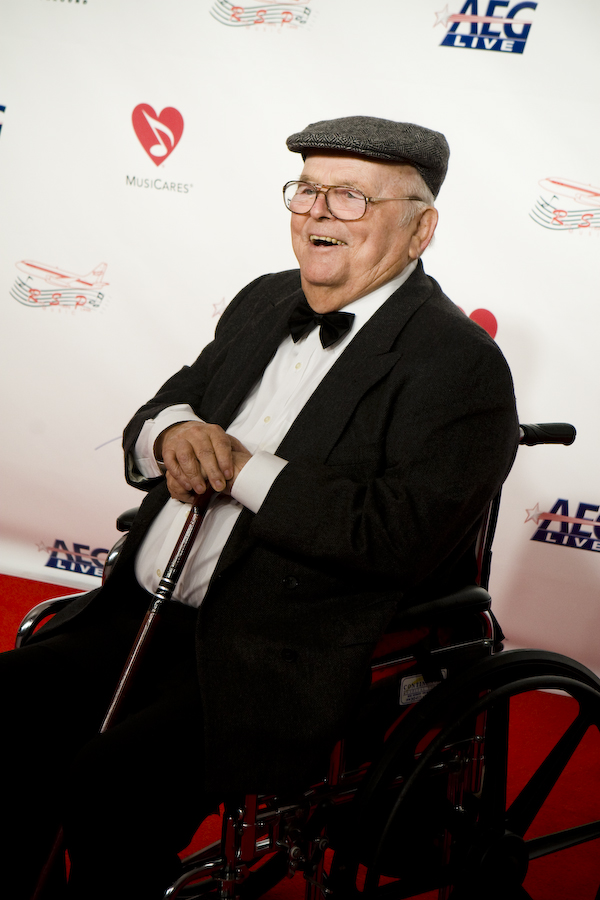
- Cossette in 2009
- Born: Pierre Maurice Joseph Cossette; December 15, 1923; Valleyfield, Quebec, Canada
- Died: September 11, 2009 (aged 85); Ormstown, Quebec, Canada
- Occupations: Television and Broadway producer

Pierre Maurice Joseph Cossette (December 15, 1923 – September 11, 2009) was a television executive producer and Broadway producer. Cossette produced the first television broadcast of the Grammy Awards in 1971. He was one of the founders of Dunhill Records.

Cossette was inducted into Canada's Walk of Fame in 2005. Born in Valleyfield, Quebec, he also has a star on the Hollywood Walk of Fame. In 2006, a Golden Palm Star on the Palm Springs, California, Walk of Stars was dedicated to him.

His autobiography, Another Day In Showbiz: One Producer's Journey, offers his vision of the industry, detailing stars, directors, producers, movies, TV companies, record companies, and the art, creation, and exhibition of stage productions such as The Will Rogers Follies, The Scarlet Pimpernell, and The Voice of Woody Guthrie. In the book, Cossette describes a conversation he had with his personal friend, Donald Trump, about his having cast Marla Maples into his Broadway production of The Will Rogers Follies (Maples became Trump's second wife shortly thereafter).

He went from agent to producer with the help and support of entertainment giant Harry Cohn.

Cossette booked shows in Las Vegas, brought The Grammy Awards to TV, and managed performers such as Dick Shawn and Buddy Hackett. His son, John Cossette, became the producer of the Grammy Awards following Pierre Cossette's retirement.

Cossette died from congestive heart failure on September 11, 2009, in Ormstown, Quebec at the age of 85.
