= John Cossette =

American theatre and television producer (1957–2011)

- Born: February 22, 1957; Los Angeles, California, U.S.
- Died: April 26, 2011 (aged 54); Malibu, California, U.S.
- Occupations: Theater and television producer

John Cossette (February 22, 1957 – April 26, 2011) was an American theater and television producer known for his work on televised award shows, especially the television broadcasts of the Grammy Awards.

Cossette's father, television producer Pierre Cossette, was known as the "father of the Grammy Awards telecast." Pierre Cossette helmed the first televised broadcast of the Grammy Awards in 1971.

John Cossette became the producer of the Grammy Awards following the departure of his father from the awards show. Cossette remained involved with the television broadcast of the Grammy Awards for more than twenty years, and also produced the Latin Grammy Awards show and the Grammy nominations concert. Most recently, Cossette worked as the executive producer of the 53rd Grammy Awards held on February 13, 2011.

In 2009, Cossette began producing productions of the musical, Million Dollar Quartet in Chicago, on Broadway and in London's West End. Cossette also produced awards show for the cable television network, BET. His other producing credits include the reopening ceremony for Radio City Music Hall in New York City in 1999.

John Cossette died on April 26, 2011, at the age of 54. No cause of death was ever given. He was survived by his wife, Rita, and two daughters. His father, Pierre Cossette, died in September 2009.
