= Cold War (song) =

Single by Janelle Monáe

from the album The ArchAndroid
- Released: February 12, 2010
- Genre: R&B; drum and bass
- Length: 3:23
- Label: Wondaland Arts Society; Bad Boy
- Songwriters: Nathaniel Irvin III; Charles Joseph II; Janelle Monáe
- Producers: Nate Wonder; Chuck Lightning; Janelle Monáe

Janelle Monáe singles chronology
"Tightrope" (2010)	"Cold War" (2010)	"We Are Young" (2011)

Audio sample
- file; help

Music video
- "Cold War" on YouTube

"Cold War" is a song recorded by American musician Janelle Monáe, released as the second single from her debut studio album The ArchAndroid (2010). The song was written and produced by Monáe, Nathaniel Irvin III, and Charles Joseph II. It was released via Monáe's website on February 12, 2010, one day after the release of the album's first single, "Tightrope". A fast-paced new wave and Afro-funk track with a futuristic feel, its drum pattern has received several comparisons to that of the 2000 single "B.O.B" by OutKast, whose member Big Boi was one of her mentors and was featured on "Tightrope". Music critics acclaimed the song as one of the best tracks from The ArchAndroid. The music video, consisting of a single shot of Monáe against a black wall and expressing various emotions as the song progresses, has been praised by critics as a unique piece of art.

== Development ==
"Cold War" was co-written and co-produced by Monáe with Nathaniel Irvin III and Charles Joseph II. The song was recorded by Control Z and Roman GianArthur at Wonderland Studios in Atlanta, Georgia, and was mastered by Larry Anthony at CO5 Mastering in Atlanta. Irvin and Phil Tan edited "Cold War" at Wonderland Studios and Soapbox Studios, respectively. Monáe enlisted several musicians to create the song's overall sound. Irvin provided most of the instrumentation for the song, including the Mellotron, electric guitar, organ, and extra percussion. Backing vocals were recorded by Monáe and Irvin. Monáe enlisted the Wonderland Orchestra to play the strings. Kellindo Parker performs on lead guitar and rhythm guitar. Grace Shim performed on the cello while Alexander Page provided the violin and viola, with Monáe guiding head the string arrangement. YoungPete Alexander performs on the drums.

== Music and lyrics ==
"Cold War" has been described as a futuristic neo-new wave rock and Afro-funk song. The song carries an uptempo, anthemic sound that is aided by the frantic, sprinting beats and a stinging guitar solo. The song's drum track bears a similarity to that of the 2000 single "B.O.B" by OutKast, with whom Monáe has collaborated and whose member Big Boi was one of her mentors, helping her sign to Bad Boy Records. Monae's vocals on the song received several comparisons to those of Beyoncé. David D. of The Smoking Section found the lyrics to be about duality and "a cold war of inner strife ... that can be buried under smiles, electric guitars and up-tempo drum patterns".

== Release and reception ==
Upon its release, the song received general acclaim from critics. "Cold War" was released to Monáe's website on February 12, 2010 and later to other digital retailers on February 23, 2010. Dan Nishimoto of Prefix Magazine offered praise to "Cold War" for "replacing the memory of "Violet Stars Happy Hunting!" with big hooks, bigger smiles ("All the tribes come and the mighty will crumble/ We must brave this night") and a sugar-fueled beat." Matthew Cole of Slant Magazine lauded Monáe's vocals on the track, commenting "that would make Beyoncé jealous." Several music critics, such as PopMatters's Quentin B. Huff, NOW's Jason Keller and Allmusic's Andy Kellman, labelled "Cold War" as the top track on The ArchAndroid. Joe Rivers of No Ripcord described the song as genuinely thrilling. According to Sputnikmusic's Nick Butler, several songs from The ArchAndroid, including "Cold War" get away with "attempting something that simply should not work, only for her to pull it off." Lorne Thompson of The Digital Fix named "Cold War", along with "Tightrope" and "Sir Greendown", as the album's standout songs.

== Music video ==
The music video for "Cold War" was released via Vevo on August 5, 2010. It was directed by Wendy Morgan and shot at the black box auditorium in the Palace of the Dogs sanitarium. The video, which Monáe described as an "emotion picture", features a single shot of Monáe against a black wall, expressing various emotions as the song progresses. During the video, she grimaces, smiles, and breaks down crying. She described the tears as "spontaneous" and said they "triggered a chain reaction". The video received critical acclaim by music critics. Katie Hasty of HitFix called it a "fascinating little artifact of time", Larry Fitzmaurice of Pitchfork said that it was "worth a watch", and Robbie Daw of Idolator opined that Monáe "reaffirms the fact that she's one of the more unique, if not daring, artists out there at the moment".

Monáe said of the video, "I remember crying during 'Cold War' [on the] first take. I didn't know how that happened but it just did. I was very moved by that. It was really a special moment; then everybody else started to cry. [The video] deals with a psychosis—you're in my mind and you get a chance to understand Metropolis, where it all stemmed [from] and my thoughts. It's very psychedelic and trippy."

== Remix ==
There is one remix of the song titled "Cold War (Wondamix)". Part of this remix can be heard at the beginning of the "Tightrope" music video.

== Live performances ==
Monae performed a shortened version of the song as part of a three-song medley (alongside musicians B.o.B and Bruno Mars) at the 53rd Grammy Awards on February 13, 2011.

== Credits and personnel ==
Credits adapted from the liner notes of The ArchAndroid, Wondaland Arts Society, in association with Bad Boy Records.

Technical

- Janelle Monáe – lead vocals, writing, production, lyrics, backing vocals
- Nathaniel Irvin III – writing, production, backing vocals
- Charles Joseph II – writing, production
- Damien Lewis – additional editing

Recording, mastering and editing

- Recorded by Control Z and Roman GianArthur at Wonderland Studios in Atlanta, Georgia
- Mastered by Larry Anthony at CO5 Mastering in Atlanta, Georgia
- Edited by Nate Wonder at Wondaland Studios in Atlanta, Georgia and Phil Tan at Soapbox Studios

Instruments

- Nate "Rocket" Wonder – String arrangement, Mellotron, electric guitar, organ [Continental Organ], Organ [Hammond B-3], Moog synthesizer, Vibraphone, bass guitar, nuclear drums, percussion [fireworks]
- YoungPete Alexander – Drums
- Kellindo Parker – Rhythm Guitar [Atomic], Lead Guitar [Atomic], Soloist, Guitar [Atomic Solo Guitar]
- The Wonderland ArchOrchestra – Revolutionary strings
- Grace Shim – Cello
- Alexander Page – Violin, Viola

== Chart history ==
Chart (2010)	Peak position
Belgium (Ultratip Wallonia)	36
