= Angry World =

2010 song by Neil Young

Song by Neil Young

from the album Le Noise
- Released: September 14, 2010
- Recorded: July 9, 2010
- Studio: "Le Noise": Home of Daniel Lanois
- Genre: Folk rock
- Length: 4:11
- Label: Reprise
- Songwriter(s): Neil Young
- Producer(s): Daniel Lanois

"Angry World" is a song by Neil Young from his 2010 album Le Noise. It is a solo performance by Young on guitar and vocals with no additional musicians. Young wrote the tune and Daniel Lanois produced it. It won the 2011 Grammy Award for Best Rock Song and was nominated for Best Solo Rock Vocal Performance.

== Overview ==
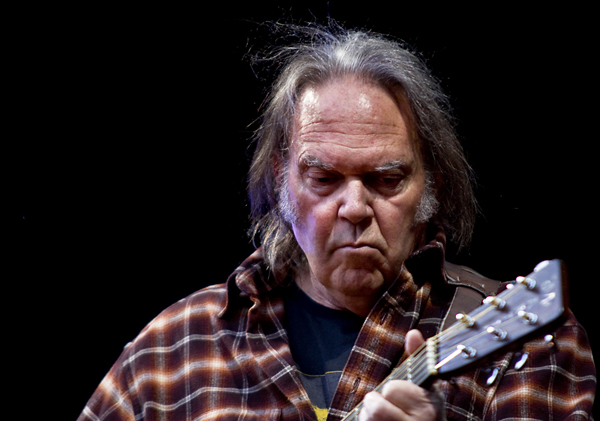
Neil Young playing his guitar

"Angry World" was the first track to be released from Le Noise. The song, like the rest of the album, was recorded in the Los Angeles home of producer Daniel Lanois. Unaccompanied by other musicians, Young's vocals, described as "howl[ing] venom", are mixed high above his guitar. There is a "buzz and crackle" to his "fuzzed-out" electric guitar and a loop of the word 'angry' as background noise throughout the song. Young delivered the incomplete track to Lanois, who built the arrangement out of what was given to him.

== Video ==
The video for "Angry World" was released on September 14, 2010, on stereogum.com, two weeks prior to the September 28 release of the album, Le Noise. It was shot in black-and-white in the home of producer Daniel Lanois by Adam CK Vollick. It contains a montage of images including Young performing and shots of belly dancers.

== Grammy Award ==
This is my first Grammy for music. I'd like to thank my lovely wife, Pegi. She's been with me for 33⅓ years of marriage, keeping me rocking.

— From Neil Young's Grammy acceptance speech.

In February 2011 "Angry World" won the Grammy Award for Best Rock Song. The other nominees were "Tighten Up" by The Black Keys, "Radioactive" by Kings of Leon, "Little Lion Man" by Mumford & Sons, and "Resistance" by Muse. It was also nominated for Best Solo Rock Vocal Performance but lost to Paul McCartney's live version of "Helter Skelter" from Good Evening New York City.

Despite more than 40 years as a recording artist, 31 studio albums and eleven nominations since 2006, the Grammy was the first awarded to Young as a musician. His previous win, Best Boxed or Special Limited Edition Package, was in 2010 for his art direction for The Archives Vol. 1 1963–1972.

== Personnel ==
- Neil Young – guitar, vocals
- Daniel Lanois – producer
