= John D. Kendall =

John D. Kendall (August 30, 1917 – January 6, 2011) was a leader in bringing the Suzuki Method to the United States. In 1959 he was presented with a grant to travel to Japan to meet Shinichi Suzuki and translate his ideas and teachings into a philosophy and pedagogy for violin teachers around the U.S.

An internationally acclaimed string pedagogue, Mr. Kendall taught violin at the college level for more than 50 years and was largely responsible for bringing the Suzuki Method to the United States. Mr. Kendall received his undergraduate degree from the Oberlin Conservatory of Music in 1939, and earned a master's degree from Teachers College, Columbia University.

In 1959, he spent six weeks in Japan observing the Talent Education community in Japan, led by Suzuki. Kendall returned for further study in 1962. Mr. Kendall planned the first US Suzuki conference in 1963, and organized the first Suzuki tour of the US. Dr. Suzuki and 10 students toured 19 cities in 21 days. This tour captured the attention of audiences everywhere and introduced the Suzuki Method to the US. A 1997 news article quoted Carol Smith, a colleague of John Kendall, as saying "It took someone with incredible energy, charisma, and communication skills to spread the word about the Suzuki method. That someone was John Kendall."

Currently, it is estimated that more than 350,000 children are learning according to Suzuki principles on violin, viola, cello, piano, guitar, flute, recorder, harp and bass. There is a Suzuki preschool, and the body of literature for Suzuki Parent Education continues to grow.

John Kendall directed the SIUE program until his retirement in 1994.

== See also ==
- Suzuki method
