= Le Noise =

Studio album by Neil Young
- Released: September 28, 2010
- Recorded: March 28 – May 28, 2010; July 9, 2010
- Studio: Le Noise, Los Angeles, California (Daniel Lanois's home)
- Genre: Folk rock; garage rock; experimental rock; noise rock
- Length: 37:59
- Label: Reprise
- Producer: Daniel Lanois

Neil Young chronology
Dreamin' Man Live '92 (2009)	Le Noise (2010)	A Treasure (2011)

Singles from Le Noise
- 1. "Love and War" Released: 2010

Le Noise is the thirty-second studio album by Canadian / American musician Neil Young, released on September 28, 2010. The album was recorded in Los Angeles and produced by Daniel Lanois, hence the titular pun. The album consists of Young performing solo, mostly on electric guitar with echo effects, distortion and feedback. The sessions coincided with the death of two of Young's longtime collaborators, filmmaker L.A. Johnson and steel guitarist Ben Keith, influencing some of the lyrics. Lanois also experienced a near-fatal motorcycle accident during recording. The album is the first collaboration between the two Canadians.

== Writing ==
In a 2019 post on his website, Young describe "Sign of Love" as "a love song that breaks my heart. Life is not always what you think it will be." Its lyrics describe a long relationship. Drummer Dave Grohl would later overdub a drum track to the song, available on Young's website as an outtake.

The lyrics of "Love and War" address the ambiguity and complexity of those topics, and the experiences of each individual create different perspectives that are rarely black and white. He explains on NPR:

The song says, 'When I sing about love and war / I don't really know what I'm saying.' And I think that sums it up. Because they're very deep subjects. You can't possibly know what it means to somebody else. War to one person may mean a justified thing that's happening for a very good reason, and another person may think that's a terrible thing and never should have happened. And another person will be thinking that he lost his sister or his brother or his mother in the war and it was a waste of time. And another person could be thinking the exact opposite: that his brother went to war and gave his life for our country. So you can't really have an opinion, although I have opinions and I've had them and I've made very loud statements about things. But that's the way I felt at the time. When I did the Living With War album, I was very outspoken about the anger I felt about certain things that were happening at that time in history. But again, I was no more right than the people who believed in it because it was such a big thing — how can you know? How can you know all of the reasons and everything that's happening? I just don't enjoy war. I'm not like a fan of war. And love can be very damaging, and it can be very good. So you just don't know where to go with these things. So I wrote about that — the quandary of not knowing what to do with any of those things. It's kind of a useless point of view.

"Hitchhiker" dates from 1975, from the sessions for Zuma. The song chronicles various life changes and drug experiences of Young's life up until that point. Young jokes in a contemporary interview that "if it was a TV show, it would be called The Drug Chronicles, T.M.I.", or too much information. Young memorably recalls performing the new song for Bob Dylan and hearing his reaction in Special Deluxe: "One night, Dylan came by and I played him a couple of new songs, "Hitchhiker" and "Cortez the Killer." When he heard "Hitchhiker," a confessional about the progressive history of drugs I had taken through my life, he told me, 'That's honest.' That moment still crosses my mind. It makes me laugh every time I think of it because Bob's humor is so wry. I think it was his way of saying kindly that the song was not very inventive as far as creating a story goes, just that I was following a history and not making up anything new. It's still funny to me, at any rate, the way he put it." Young would revise the song and add a new verse during the sessions. He explains in Waging Heavy Peace: "We hit a groove and recorded "Love and War" and "Peaceful Valley Boulevard," two songs written in Hawaii, and an older song called "Hitchhiker" that I hadn't cut yet. The previous night I had added a couple of new verses and changed some words to make it more relevant to me now, and it was "a good 'un," as Ben used to say. I did that song on Old Black through some amps Daniel had set up, and it sounded rockin'!" An acoustic take of the song from August 1976 would later be released in 2017 on Hitchhiker.

"Peaceful Valley Boulevard" is a sweeping environmental history of the Old West. "I walked into it hearing a gunshot across a valley, back in the day, and then everything else just unfolded. It did go from past to present to semi-future, but sometimes that happens. Not that often, but it does happen, and when it does I always feel fortunate, because it seems to always get somewhere that I don't usually get.

A number of songs recorded during the sessions did not make it to the final album; these recordings were premiered in August 2019 as a part of The Complete Le Noise Sessions film on Neil Young Archives website and are available as outtakes. "Born in Ontario", "Twisted Road" and "For the Love of Man" would be later re-recorded with Crazy Horse for Psychedelic Pill. "You Never Call", a tribute to recently deceased L.A. Johnson, a longtime associate of Young, appears on concert film Neil Young Journeys. It and the solo piano song "Leia" were frequently performed live during the tour in support of the album.

== Recording ==
Young initially called Daniel Lanois in early 2010 with the request to make an acoustic album, after seeing videos on the internet of Lanois and engineer Mark Howard working on Black Dub. The recording took place at a makeshift studio set up at Lanois's Silverlake house. Young describes the setting in Waging Heavy Peace: "The house was actually a mansion from the thirties. I loved the architecture of the place. It was so Old Hollywood! It reminded me of the film era, with its spiral staircases and Mediterranean look; the beautifully designed windows and arches everywhere were pleasing to the eye. When I arrived there, I was very impressed with what he had going on. He had prepared a group of rooms for me to play in and set up the sounds in advance, even prepared some instruments for me to try. It was a very interesting way to start. He had really done his homework." Engineer Mark Howard remembers: "We looked at the acoustics of each room, and at what the best combinations of acoustic guitars and microphones were, and what looked the best when we filmed there. So when Neil walked into the door, we were prepared, and he'd play and he'd be like 'Wow!' The best thing you can do for a musician is to get them excited. As soon as you win their confidence with a great sound, and they know they don't have to worry about anything technical, you are going to get great performances out of them. They are just going to nail it."

While attempting to record "Hitchhiker", a song written back in the 1970s and finished during the sessions, Young decided that it felt more appropriate to play on an electric guitar. While two songs, "Love and War" and "Peaceful Valley Boulevard", remained in acoustic form, Young did the rest of the album on electric guitar, with Howard and Lanois applying dub techniques they had developed while working on Black Dub. A distinctive guitar sound was achieved by Young playing his Gretsch White Falcon with stereo pickups through two Fender Deluxe amplifiers, and treated with Eventide H3500 subharmonic generator. Lanois explains the decision to record the songs as solo electric performances: "Neil and I bonded over our love and enthusiasm of amps. I have a great collection of Fender Tweed Deluxes from the '50s, and I think when I suggested pulling out an electric guitar or two, Neil got excited about hearing what those amps could do. It's a really interesting guitar because of its split pickup, which allows the bass strings to come out of one amp while the top strings can come out of another. So already, without me trying to manipulate the signal, you get a really cool, unique sound out of the guitar." On "Hitchhiker", Young plays his Les Paul, "Old Black". "Neil starts playing that and you go, 'Oh yeah, that's him!' It's got a meaty, grungy, gnarly presence, whereas the Gretsch has more midrange and clarity to it. Both guitars sound great through those Tweeds."

Both guitar and voice were treated with delay effects from the Lexicon Prime Time and the TC Electronics Fireworks; Lanois and Howard applied the effects in real time, with Young able to hear the results through the monitoring system. According to Howard, "when you stood in the centre of the room, it was the best sound you've ever heard, it was incredible. We had those speakers going at full tilt, and when you put your hand on the walls, they were shaking. It was almost earthquake material! [...] Neil was pushing us, saying, 'Hey guys, that's great, just take it to the next level. Give me more of that!' So after recording, we went in there again with most songs and caught certain words and phrases and dubbed them". Young describes for the New York Times his satisfaction with Lanois' mixing process: "Everything that happened actually happened, but he'll take pieces of the performance and put them in again and put them in different places. He does a performance in the mix, and I do a performance in the performance and it comes together to be what you see and hear." Lanois explains, "I like the broad brush-stroke analogy. It's a very painterly way of looking at things, and I love for music to have pictures. That part of my work has never changed: I like things to be cinematic. I also think that the detail is always there in my work. The first impression of the Neil Young record is perhaps that it is raw, with not much done to it, but on close inspection some beautiful work has been done to details."

== Release ==
On August 20, Young revealed the upcoming album and its release date stating that it would be a solo album. Le Noise was released on September 28 on CD, vinyl, Blu-ray and digitally. Accompanying the album was a black and white film of live-in-studio performances of all the songs, shot by Adam CK Vollick; it was released on YouTube as well as in DVD format. Videos for "Angry World", "Hitchhiker", "Love And War" and "Walk With Me" were premiered separately before the album release.

The track "Angry World" won a Grammy Award for Best Solo Rock Vocal Performance.

== Promotion ==
Young promoted the album with a solo tour of North America, dubbed the Twisted Road tour, between May and September 2010. During the tour, he performed songs and outtakes from the album along with classic songs in a solo electric style.

== Critical reception ==
Professional ratings
Aggregate scores
Source	Rating
Metacritic	80/100
Review scores
Source	Rating
AllMusic	3/5 stars
Chicago Tribune	4/4 stars
Consequence of Sound	4.5/5 stars
The Guardian	4/5 stars
Los Angeles Times	3.5/4 stars
Pitchfork	7.6/10
PopMatters	9/10
Rolling Stone	4/5 stars
Slant Magazine	4/5 stars
Uncut	5/5 stars

Le Noise received generally positive reviews with Uncut magazine proclaiming it as the second best album of 2010 in its year-end Top 50 Albums list. This album was number 20 on Rolling Stone's list of the 30 Best Albums of 2010.

The album was named as a longlisted nominee for the 2011 Polaris Music Prize.

== Commercial performance ==
The album was placed 2nd on the Canadian Albums Chart, selling over 10,000 copies in the first week of release.

== Track listing ==
All tracks are written by Neil Young.

No.	Title	Length
1.	"Walk with Me"	4:25
2.	"Sign of Love"	3:58
3.	"Someone's Gonna Rescue You"	3:29
4.	"Love and War"	5:37
5.	"Angry World"	4:11
6.	"Hitchhiker"	5:32
7.	"Peaceful Valley Boulevard"	7:10
8.	"Rumblin'"	3:39

== Personnel ==
- Neil Young – guitars, vocals

Additional roles

- Daniel Lanois – production
- Mark Howard – recording, mixing
- Tony Mangurian, Flo Ammon – editing
- Chris Bellman – mastering
- Margaret Marissen – production assistance

Visual production

- Adam CK Vollick – direction, photography and editing direction
- Daniel Lanois – direction, production
- Bernard Shakey (Neil Young) – production
- Carolina Cerisola – dancing ("Angry World")

Blu-ray production

- Bernard Shakey (Neil Young) – direction
- Will Mitchell – production
- Elliot Rabinowitz – executive production
- Toshi Onuki – art direction
- Ole Lutjens, Joe Rice, Tony Rotundo – production
- Richard Ross, Phil Starner, Travis Boyle, David Bourn – engineering
- Brandon LaSan, Eric Martinez, Mario San Miguel, Hannah Johnson – production assistance
- Adam CK Vollick, Jim Misiano – photography

== Charts ==
Chart performance for Le Noise
Chart (2010)	Peak position
Australian Albums (ARIA)	41
Austrian Albums (Ö3 Austria)	19
Belgian Albums (Ultratop Flanders)	13
Belgian Albums (Ultratop Wallonia)	24
Canadian Albums Chart	2
Croatian Foreign Albums (TOTS)	2
Danish Albums (Hitlisten)	6
Dutch Albums (Album Top 100)	18
European Top 100 Albums	10
Finnish Albums (Suomen virallinen lista)	30
French Albums (SNEP)	23
German Albums (Offizielle Top 100)	22
Irish Albums (IRMA)	14
Italian Albums (FIMI)	26
New Zealand Albums (RMNZ)	30
Norwegian Albums (VG-lista)	3
Spanish Albums (Promusicae)	21
Swedish Albums (Sverigetopplistan)	2
Swiss Albums (Schweizer Hitparade)	29
UK Albums Chart	18
US Billboard 200	14
US Top Rock Albums (Billboard)	4
US Indie Store Album Sales (Billboard)	1
