= Vocabularies =

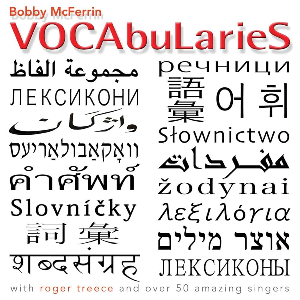

Studio album by Bobby McFerrin
- Released: April 6, 2010
- Genre: Jazz
- Length: 63:50
- Label: EmArcy
- Producer: Roger Treece, Linda Goldstein

Bobby McFerrin chronology
Beyond Words (2002)	Vocabularies (2010)	Spirityouall (2013)

Professional ratings
Review scores
Source	Rating
Allmusic	4.5/5 stars
All About Jazz	5/5 stars
All About Jazz Italy	4.5/5 stars

Vocabularies (stylized as VOCAbuLarieS) is the ninth studio album by American jazz vocalist Bobby McFerrin that was recorded with composer Roger Treece and released on April 6, 2010 by EmArcy in the United States. Described on McFerrin's website as "music for the 21st century", the album took seven years to make with over 1,400 vocal tracks recorded by over 50 singers in order to form a "virtual choir".

The album received critical acclaim from critics for its ambition and musical complexity.

== Track listing ==
No.	Title	Writer(s)	Length
1.	"Baby"	Bobby McFerrin, Roger Treece	8:04
2.	"Say Ladeo"	McFerrin, Don Rosler, Treece	8:44
3.	"Wailers"	McFerrin, Treece	10:25
4.	"Messages"	Rosler, Treece	11:22
5.	"The Garden"	McFerrin, Treece	8:34
6.	"He Ran to the Train"	McFerrin, Treece	10:29
7.	"Brief Eternity"	Rosler, Treece	6:13
Total length:			63:50

== Critical response ==
Vocabularies received critical acclaim from critics. Thom Jurek of AllMusic gave the album four and a half out of five stars, writing that it is "easily McFerrin’s finest moment on record as well as his most ambitious, and should win him some new fans even among cynics." Mark F. Turner of All About Jazz gave the album five out of five stars, stating that it is McFerrin's "most challenging release to date" for his attempt to collaborate with 50 singers over seven years to create a virtual choir, with every song "defined by their playfulness and infectious rhythms, as well as their unique vocalizations and interplay." Ryan Reed of PopMatters gave a highly positive review of the album, considering it to be McFerrin's first album to "have truly captured the full scope and spirit of McFerrin's abilities and eclecticism", writing further that it is "a testament to both McFerrin's long-underrated abilities, and the sheer expansiveness and possibilities of the human voice.

John Eyles of the BBC emphasized that Vocabularies is not only Mcferrin's most ambitious project, "it is also one of the most complex albums ever constructed", and that "[t]he end result has that wow factor which signals an instant classic". Allan McFarlane of AudioEnz (StereoNET Australia) gave high praises for the album's "startling[ly]" unique arrangements and meticulous construction, writing that it is "as ambitious as it is successful, bringing three decades of experience and often experimental music making to this culmination of a lifetime[']s artistic endeavour."

== Personnel ==
- Bobby McFerrin – vocals
- Roger Treece – vocals, synthesizer programming
- Alex Acuña – percussion
- Sandra Anderson – vocals
- Sandy Anderson – vocals
- Ryland Angel – vocals
- Thom Baker – vocals
- Joey Blake – vocals
- Theo Bleckmann – vocals
- Kristina Boerger – vocals
- Everett Bradley – vocals
- Lincoln Briney – vocals
- Katie Campbell – vocals
- Bonnie Denise Christansen – vocals
- Pierre Cook – vocals
- Cole Davis – vocals
- Daniel Abraham DeVeau – vocals
- Sussan Deyhim – vocals
- Judi Donaghy – vocals
- Michele Eaton – vocals
- Gary Eckert – vocals
- Rosana Eckert – vocals
- Peter Eldridge – vocals
- Elizabeth Farnum – vocals
- Andrea Figallo – vocals
- Lisa Fischer – vocals
- La Tanya Hall – vocals
- Albert Hera – vocals
- Datevik Hovanesian – vocals
- Aubrey Johnson – vocals
- Mark Johnson – vocals
- Curtis King – vocals
- Lauren Kinhan – vocals
- Josephine Lee – vocals
- Darmon Meader – vocals
- Alexandra Montano – vocals
- Gayla Morgan – vocals
- Kim Nazarian – vocals
- Kevin Osborne – vocals
- Darren Percival – vocals
- Beth Quist – vocals
- Rhiannon – vocals
- David Root – vocals
- Marlon Saunders – vocals
- Fletcher Sheridan – vocals
- Janis Siegel – vocals
- Richard Slade – vocals
- Luciana Souza – vocals
- Michael Steinberger – vocals
- Darryl Tookes – vocals
- Roger Treece – vocals
- Michelle Mailhot Vines – vocals
- Amelia Watkins – vocals
- Michele Weir – vocals
- David B. Whitworth – vocals
- Dave Worm – vocals
