= Tightrope (Janelle Monáe song) =

Single by Janelle Monáe featuring Big Boi

from the album The ArchAndroid
- Released: February 11, 2010
- Studio: Wondaland Studios (Atlanta, GA)
- Genre: Funk; neo soul; art pop
- Length: 4:23
- Label: Wondaland Arts Society; Bad Boy Records
- Songwriters: Nathaniel Irvin III; Charles Joseph II; Antwan Patton; Janelle Monáe Robinson
- Producers: Nate Wonder; Chuck Lightning; Janelle Monáe

Janelle Monáe singles chronology
"Many Moons" (2008)	"Tightrope" (2010)	"Cold War" (2010)

Remix cover
- Cover for "Tightrope (Wondamix)" featuring B.o.B and Lupe Fiasco

Music video
- "Tightrope" on YouTube

"Tightrope" is a song by American singer Janelle Monáe, released on February 11, 2010, as the first official single from her debut studio album The ArchAndroid.

On Pitchfork, the single earned the coveted "Best New Music" tag and an immediate 9/10 rating on February 11. The companion song, "Cold War", debuted on February 12 via Monáe's official website.

The official remix, titled "Tightrope (Wondamix)", features rappers B.o.B and Lupe Fiasco. The solo version of the song without Big Boi is also featured in the video game Just Dance 3. It was featured during the end credits for Happy Feet Two, in a version that uses some singing from one of the characters and also features a new verse from American child actor and rapper Lil' P-Nut which replaced Big Boi's verse. The song also featured in the third-season finale of teen drama 90210.

== Concept ==
Speaking in May 2010 to UK urban writer Pete Lewis, deputy editor of Blues & Soul, Monáe discussed the background to the song: "'Tightrope' is dealing with how in life it's important to keep your balance and not get too high or low about things during the time when you're either being praised or being criticised. Which is something that, as artists, Big Boi and I could both relate to, because there are so many peaks and dips along the journey of just being an artist on the road to success. So we both felt it was important to kinda help those everyday working people who are constantly dealing with life's obstacles, by giving them like a tutorial on how to deal with issues face-on."

== Composition ==
"Tightrope" features futuristic, space themes; however, it has also been described to feature "serious old-school entertainer bona fides". Pitchfork note that the tracks sped up alien backing vocals are the only thing that keep the theme of sci-fi and of the future. The song has also been compared to singer Amerie's track "1 Thing", and Monáe was likened to Katharine Hepburn for her vocals on the track. Pitchfork went on to explain, "But when the chorus hits, she switches up into a classic soul-singer wail, the type of immediate retro yowl that keeps Sharon Jones in fancy shoes. And after Big Boi struts on in and rhymes 'NASDAQ' with 'ass crack', she ups the ante, rhyming 'alligators' with 'rattlesnakers,' 'another flavor,' and 'Terminator.' It's just a star performance all around, and God knows we need those lately."

== Music video ==
Monáe released the video on March 31, 2010. The music video was directed by director Wendy Morgan. In the music video she portrays an inpatient that possesses the power to walk through walls and later she catches the "crazy/dancing feet" with her friends. Monáe talked about the video, saying, "'Tightrope' takes place at the Palace of the Dogs. A lot of the greats were admitted into this place, like Charlie Parker and Jimi Hendrix. We wanted to keep it raw and funky—just having it in an insane asylum made it that much cooler to me." The video references experimental filmmaker Maya Deren's iconic 1943 film, Meshes of the Afternoon.

== Live performances ==
Monáe performed the song on the Late Show with David Letterman on May 18, 2010, The Ellen DeGeneres Show on May 26, Lopez Tonight on May 27, Last Call with Carson Daly on May 28, and on Dancing with the Stars on September 28. In the UK, the song was the "Single of the Week" on iTunes (i.e. released as a free download) for 7 days (beginning July 13, 2010) to promote the release of her album, The ArchAndroid (Suites II and III). On June 25, 2011, she performed "Tightrope" along with other songs at Glastonbury Festival.

== Accolades ==
Rolling Stone named "Tightrope" the eighth best single of 2010 in its year-end list. SPIN ranked the song at #9 on its The 20 Best Songs of 2010, and PopMatters placed it at #2 on its The 60 Best Songs of 2010. Pitchfork ranked it number 10 on its year-end list. Spinner named it #38 on its best songs of 2010. NME named the music video for "Tightrope" #1 on its 50 Best Music Video of 2010. In January 2011, The Village Voice's Pazz & Jop annual critics' poll ranked "Tightrope" at number 2 to find the best music of 2010, behind CeeLo Green's "Forget You".

The song was also featured in the Chevrolet Cruze Canadian commercial to promote the new vehicle and in the American retail chain Kmart ”Back to School commercial in 2011. It was featured on the unranked list of TIME'S ALL-TIME 100 Songs.

== Track listings ==
Solo version single

- Tightrope (the solo version)

Wondamix single

- Tightrope (Wondamix) (feat. B.o.B and Lupe Fiasco)

Digital remix EP

- Tightrope (Robbie Rivera's Juicy mix)
- Tightrope (Robbie Rivera's Juicy Big Room dub)
- Tightrope (Robbie Rivera's radio mix)
- Tightrope (Goodwill & Hook 'N' Sling remix)
- Tightrope (Paul Harris vocal remix)
- Tightrope (Paul Harris dub)
- Tightrope (10 Rapid instrumental)
- Tightrope (Wondamix) (feat. B.o.B and Lupe Fiasco)
- Tightrope (acapella) (feat. Big Boi)

== Cover versions ==
- Marcus Miller and Dr. John recorded the song for Miller's 2012 album Renaissance
- A cover version of the song was included on British singer Marcus Collins' 2012 self-titled debut album.
- The Dø recorded a version of the song on their 2012 live album Both Ways Open Jaws (Extended) [Live at Studio Pigalle]
- At a 2014 event by Billboard, Scottish synthpop band Chvrches performed a cover of the song.
- Majesty Rose performed this song during the top 13 week on season 13 of American Idol.
- This song was also covered in the Glee final season second episode "Homecoming" by The Warblers and new character Jane Hayward, played by Samantha Marie Ware.
- Tyanna Jones covered the song on American Idol.
- Nadjah Nicole sang in the Blind Auditions from The Voice, turning three chairs and ultimately opting to join Team Blake (Shelton).
- On the March 20, 2017, episode of The Voice, Team Alicia (Keys) members Anatalia Villaranda of Temecula, California, and Melissa "Missy" Robertson of Sacramento, California, performed an arrangement of the song in a Battle round. Although coach Blake Shelton preferred Robertson's performance, Keys ultimately agreed with the preference of coaches Adam Levine and Gwen Stefani and named Villaranda the winner of the Battle, advancing her to the Knockout round. Soon after, Robertson was eliminated when Levine, Stefani, and Shelton all opted not to steal her onto any of their teams.

== Charts ==
Chart (2010)	Peak position
Belgium (Ultratip Bubbling Under Flanders)	20
South Korea (Gaon International)	61

== Certifications ==
Certifications and sales for "Tightrope"
Region	Certification	Certified units/sales
Canada (Music Canada)	Gold	40,000^{‡}
United States (RIAA)	Gold	500,000^{‡}
^{‡} Sales+streaming figures based on certification alone.
