= Sub Urban discography =

Band discography

- Studio albums: 2
- EPs: 1
- Singles: 19
- Music videos: 17

American singer-songwriter Sub Urban has released two studio albums, one extended play (EP), 19 singles (including three as a featured artist), and 17 music videos. Sub Urban rose to prominence with his single "Cradles", in 2019. The track had topped the Billboard Alternative Airplay chart, and has since then received a platinum certification by the Recording Industry Association of America (RIAA).

He released his debut extended play (EP), Thrill Seeker in March 2020 through Warner Records. A song from the EP, "Freak", became a sleeper hit after its release, and charted on numerous single charts, including the US Billboard Hot Rock & Alternative Songs. In 2022, Sub Urban would release his debut studio album, Hive. It featured guest appearances from Aurora, Bella Poarch and Benee among others.

== Studio albums ==
Title	Details
Hive	Released: June 3, 2022; Label: Warner; Formats: Digital download, streaming, CD
If Nevermore	Released: June 6, 2025; Label: AWAL; Formats: Digital download, streaming, CD

=== Reissues ===
Title	Details
If Nevermore (Anhedonia)	Released: April 1, 2026; Label: AWAL; Formats: Digital download, streaming, CD

== Extended plays ==
Title	Details
Thrill Seeker	Released: March 13, 2020; Label: Warner; Formats: Digital download, streaming
A Courtship Horror	Released: September 4, 2026; Label: Self-released; Formats: Digital download, streaming, CD, LP

== Singles ==
Title	Year	Peak chart positions				Certifications	Album
Title	Year	US Bub.	US Alt.	CAN	CAN Rock	Certifications	Album
"Broken" (with DNMO)	2017	—	—	—	—		Non-album singles
"Do It Better" (with DNMO & Ayelle)	2018	—	—	—	—		Non-album singles
"Sick of You" (with DNMO)	2019	—	—	—	—		Definition Forbidden
"Cradles"	2019	—	1	—	32	RIAA: Platinum; BPI: Silver; MC: Platinum	Non-album single
"Isolate"	2019	—	—	—	—		Thrill Seeker
"Freak" (with Rei Ami)	2020	—	28	—	—		Thrill Seeker
"Patchwerk" (with Two Feet)	2021	—	—	—	—		Non-album single
"Inferno" (with Bella Poarch)	2021	4	35	61	—	RIAA: Gold	Hive
"Paramour" (with Aurora)	2021	—	—	—	—		Hive
"Uh Oh!" (with Benee)	2022	—	—	—	—		Hive
"Candyman"	2022	—	—	—	—		Hive
"Skinny Loser"	2024	—	—	—	—		If Nevermore
"See Myself"	2024	—	—	—	—		If Nevermore
"Make Me Forget"	2025	—	—	—	—		If Nevermore
"Mascara"	2025	—	—	—	—		If Nevermore
"In Sunder"	2025	—	—	—	—		If Nevermore
"Mercury"	2025	–	–	–	–		Non-album single
"555"	2026	–	–	–	–		If Nevermore (Anhedonia)
"Hiraeth"	2026	–	–	–	–		If Nevermore (Anhedonia)
"Time of My Life"	2026	–	–	–	–		A Courtship Horror
"—" denotes a recording that did not chart or was not released in that territory.

== Music videos ==
Year	Song	Director
2019	"Cradles"	Andrew Donoho
2020	"Freak" (with Rei Ami)	Andrew Donoho
2021	"Cirque"	Andrew Donoho
2021	"Patchwerk" (with Two Feet)	Andrew Donoho
2021	"Inferno" (with Bella Poarch)	Andrew Donoho
2021	"Paramour" (with Aurora)	Axel Kabundji
2022	"Uh Oh!" (with Benee)	Andrew Donoho
2022	"Candyman"	Axel Kabundji
2022	"Bandit"	Brendan Vaughan
2024	"Skinny Loser"	Sterling Larose
2024	"See Myself"	Sterling Larose
2025	"Make Me Forget"	Sterling Larose
2025	"Mascara"	Sterling Larose
2025	"Mercury"	Meg Darbourne
2026	"What You Sow"	Sterling Larose
2026	"555"	Anton Reva
2026	"Hiraeth"	Anton Reva
2026	"Time of My Life"	Anton Reva
2026	"The Wedding	Anton Reva

=== Songwriting credits ===
Song	Year	Artist(s)	Album
"Problems"	2020	Anne-Marie	Non-album single
"Build a Bitch"	2021	Bella Poarch	Dolls
"Dolls"	2022	Bella Poarch	Dolls
"Living Hell"	2022	Bella Poarch	Dolls
"Villain"	2022	Bella Poarch	Dolls
"No Man's Land"	2022	Bella Poarch	Dolls
"POS"	2023	Sueco	Non-album single
