= Dolls (EP) =

EP by Bella Poarch
- Released: August 12, 2022
- Genre: Alternative
- Length: 13:56
- Label: Warner Records
- Producer: Evan Blair; Sub Urban; Elie Rizk

Bella Poarch chronology
Dolls (2022)	Picnic at the Cemetery (2026)

Singles from Dolls
- 1. "Build a Bitch" Released: May 14, 2021; 2. "Inferno" Released: August 13, 2021; 3. "Dolls" Released: July 15, 2022

Dolls is the debut extended play (EP) by American musician Bella Poarch. It was released by Warner Records on August 12, 2022.

== Background and release ==
In an interview, when asked about what inspired her to make the EP, Bella Poarch stated: "I think what inspired me the most and to do this is speaking up. Even [in] my journey with TikTok, I wasn't speaking for a whole year—nobody knew what I sounded like". "Build a Bitch", which ended up as the EP's lead single, and received a music video on May 14, 2021. On May 14, 2021, "Inferno" was released as the EP's second single. Poarch announced Dolls and released its third and final single, "Dolls", on July 15, 2022. The EP was later released through Warner on August 12, 2022.

== Composition ==
Dolls is an alternative album that has also been described as dark pop.

== Track listing ==
No.	Title	Writer(s)	Producer(s)	Length
1.	"Build a Bitch"	Belinda Batumbakal; David Arkwright; Salem Davern; Elie Rizk; Daniel Maisonneuve	Sub Urban; David Arkwright; Justin Gammella	2:02
2.	"Dolls"	Batumbakal	Sub Urban; Elie Rizk	2:12
3.	"Living Hell"	Batumbakal	Sub Urban; Elie Rizk	2:54
4.	"No Man's Land"	Batumbakal	Sub Urban; Elie Rizk	2:08
5.	"Villian"	Batumbakal	Evan Blair; Sub Urban; Elie Rizk	2:25
6.	"Inferno"	Batumbakal	Sub Urban	2:13
Total length:				13:56
