= If Nevermore (album) =

Studio album by Sub Urban
- Released: June 6, 2025
- Recorded: 2022–2024
- Genres: Alternative pop; dark pop; rock
- Length: 43:10
- Label: AWAL
- Producers: Sub Urban; Elie Rizk; Arkane Skye; Geoffrey Hufford

Sub Urban chronology
| Hive (2022) | If Nevermore (2025) | A Courtship Horror (2026) |

Singles from If Nevermore
- 1. "Skinny Loser" Released: September 20, 2024; 2. "See Myself" Released: November 15, 2024; 3. "Make Me Forget" Released: March 14, 2025; 4. "Fingernails" Released: March 14, 2025; 5. "Mascara" Released: April 18, 2025; 6. "In Sunder" Released: May 16, 2025

Alternate cover
- Deluxe edition cover

If Nevermore is the second studio album by the American singer-songwriter Sub Urban. It was released by AWAL on June 6, 2025, and serves as the follow up to his first studio album, Hive (2022). He began recording the album alongside Jake Weinberg between 2022 and 2024. The project was promoted through six singles—"Skinny Loser", "See Myself", "Make Me Forget", "Fingernails", "Mascara", and "In Sunder"—as well as an accompanying tour. The album was written and recorded in Los Angeles, with production handled by various record producers, including Arkane Skye and Geoffry Hufford. Upon release, If Nevermore had received praise from critics.

== Background and recording ==
In 2019, Sub Urban signed to the American record label Warner Records, following the virality of his song "Cradles". The next year, Maisonneuve released his debut extended play (EP), Thrill Seeker; which spawned his second major hit, "Freak". Following the release of his debut studio album, Hive, in 2022, Sub Urban had begun working on new material for If Nevermore. Recording took place between 2022 and 2024, with the album expanding on his "dark" and "theatrical pop" style. In an interview, Sub Urban had stated that: "This entire independent project spans some of my deepest turmoil from the start of my career ‘til now. Uphill battles I may never get to genuinely speak on through any other voice but music. Reality became less definitive when some of these songs were realized. Thank you to the ones who can hear me through all these raging walls and continue to follow me into the dark".

== Composition ==
"Skinny Loser"
"Skinny Loser" is an example of Maisonneuve's dark alternative and rock-based production with distortion.

If Nevermore is a dark pop album that incorporates elements of various genres. The album consists of 14 tracks and clocks out at about 43 minutes. "Hiraeth" is a theatrical song that mixes reverse sounds, beat skips, and a "dark", "alluring vibe", which is "simply enchanting". Production for the album was handled by multiple record producers, including Sub Urban himself, Daniel Garrity, and Elle Rizk, among others.

== Release and promotion ==
The album's lead single "Skinny Loser" was released on September 20, 2024. Sub Urban had later officially announced If Nevermore in March 2025, with the release of the double singles "Make Me Forget" and "Fingernails". On June 6, 2025, If Nevermore was released through AWAL. In April 2026, Maisonneuve would release If Nevermore (Anhedonia); an expanded edition of If Nevermore, which included the additional EP Anhedonia. Throughout September and October 2026, Maisonneuve is expected to embark on The Bell Tolls headlining tour across North American in support of If Nevermore (Anhedonia).

== Critical reception ==
Emily McCormack of Melodic Magazine wrote that "The sound itself is liminal, chaotic, and chill all wrapped in one". The reviewer felt that If Nevermore was one of "[his] most powerful works yet". While in another review, she regarded "Skinny Loser", the album's lead single, as one of its standout tracks.

== Track listing ==
If Nevermore track listing
| No. | Title | Length |
|---|---|---|
| 1. | "Mycelium Eyes" | 3:54 |
| 2. | "What You Sow" | 3:32 |
| 3. | "Skinny Loser" | 3:28 |
| 4. | "Stay Still" | 3:09 |
| 5. | "Like Love" | 2:19 |
| 6. | "In Sunder" | 3:28 |
| 7. | "Clip Thru U" | 3:32 |
| 8. | "Mascara" | 2:16 |
| 9. | "Make Me Forget" | 3:05 |
| 10. | "Fingernails" | 3:07 |
| 11. | "This Void Can Be Satiated" | 2:46 |
| 12. | "Fill This Empty Mall with Water and Ivy" | 3:10 |
| 13. | "See Myself" | 2:31 |
| 14. | "When I Can't Make You Mine" | 2:47 |
| Total length: | | 43:10 |

Anhedonia EP (bonus tracks)
| No. | Title | Length |
|---|---|---|
| 15. | "Hiraeth" | 3:20 |
| 16. | "Chemical Coffins" | 2:03 |
| 17. | "555" | 3:07 |
| 18. | "Lord of Nothing" | 3:38 |
| Total length: | | 55:21 |

Notes

- Track 8 is stylized as "Clip thru U."
- Track 12 is stylized in sentence case as "Fill this empty mall with water and ivy."

== Personnel ==
Credits adapted from Tidal.

- Daniel Maisonneuve – songwriting, production, mixing
- Arkane Skye – electric guitar
- Skye Abrams – songwriting
- Graydon Fritzching – engineering, mastering
- Daniel Garrity – production
