= Inferno (song) =

Single by Sub Urban and Bella Poarch

from the EP Dolls and the album Hive
- Released: August 13, 2021
- Recorded: 2021
- Genre: Dance-pop; dark pop
- Length: 2:13
- Label: Warner
- Songwriters: Daniel Maisonneuve; Bella Poarch; Elie Rizk; Geoffrey Hufford; Bendik Moller; Salem Ilese
- Producer: Sub Urban

Bella Poarch singles chronology
"Build a Bitch" (2021)	"Inferno" (2021)	"Dolls" (2022)

Sub Urban singles chronology
"Patchwerk" (2021)	"Inferno" (2021)	"Paramour" (2021)

Music video
- "Inferno" on YouTube

"Inferno" is a song by American producer and songwriter Sub Urban and Filipino and American social media personality Bella Poarch. It was released through Warner Records on August 13, 2021 as the second single from Poarch's debut extended play Dolls (2022) and the lead single from Sub Urban's debut studio album Hive (2022). The song follows the May 2021 release of Poarch's debut single "Build a Bitch".

== Background and promotion ==
In early August 2021, Poarch announced she would release a new single on August 13. The announcement was accompanied by a 30-second video teaser featuring cameo appearances by producer Sub Urban along with Twitch streamers Adin Ross, Disguised Toast, Ludwig, and TommyInnit.

== Production and composition ==
"Inferno" was described as "another dark pop offering" from Poarch, featuring "heavy beats and the chilling sound of creepy children singing". The track also includes "theatrical and classical elements and a hint of tango" with lyrics about Poarch's "troubled past".

== Music video ==
In a statement, Poarch had included a trigger warning for the music video, writing "As a victim of sexual assault, this song and video mean a lot to me. This is something I haven't been ready to share with you just yet. It's very hard for me to talk about. But I'm ready now. I decided to express myself by creating a song and video with Sub Urban based on how I wished my experience went. It's a fantasy I wish was true. I'm looking forward to sharing this with you all."

The video (directed by Andrew Donoho; who previously directed Sub Urban's and Bella's music videos for Cradles, Freak, Cirque, Patchwerk and Build a Bitch) takes place in a Hollywood glamour-themed hotel in which Poarch is drugged by two men and pulled into an elevator. Upon entering the elevator, she develops superpowers and tortures the men, whilst Sub Urban, a bartender, makes sure nobody sees. She is later revealed to be the devil herself, with Sub Urban as Virgil, who takes the offending men through the 9 Circles of Hell by Dante’s Inferno.

The music video includes cameos from LilyPichu, Valkyrae, Adin Ross, Disguised Toast, Ludwig Ahgren, Pokimane, TommyInnit, CouRageJD, Ivana Alawi, and Bretman Rock.

== Charts ==
=== Weekly charts ===
Weekly chart performance for "Inferno"
Chart (2021)	Peak position
Canada (Canadian Hot 100)	61
Global 200 (Billboard)	103
New Zealand Hot Singles (RMNZ)	13
US Bubbling Under Hot 100 (Billboard)	4
US Hot Rock & Alternative Songs (Billboard)	12

=== Year-end charts ===
Year-end chart performance for "Inferno"
Chart (2021)	Position
US Hot Rock & Alternative Songs (Billboard)	76

== Certifications ==
Certifications for "Inferno"
Region	Certification	Certified units/sales
Brazil (Pro-Música Brasil)	Gold	20,000^{‡}
United States (RIAA)	Gold	500,000^{‡}
^{‡} Sales+streaming figures based on certification alone.
