= CouRageJD =

YouTuber and streamer (born 1994)

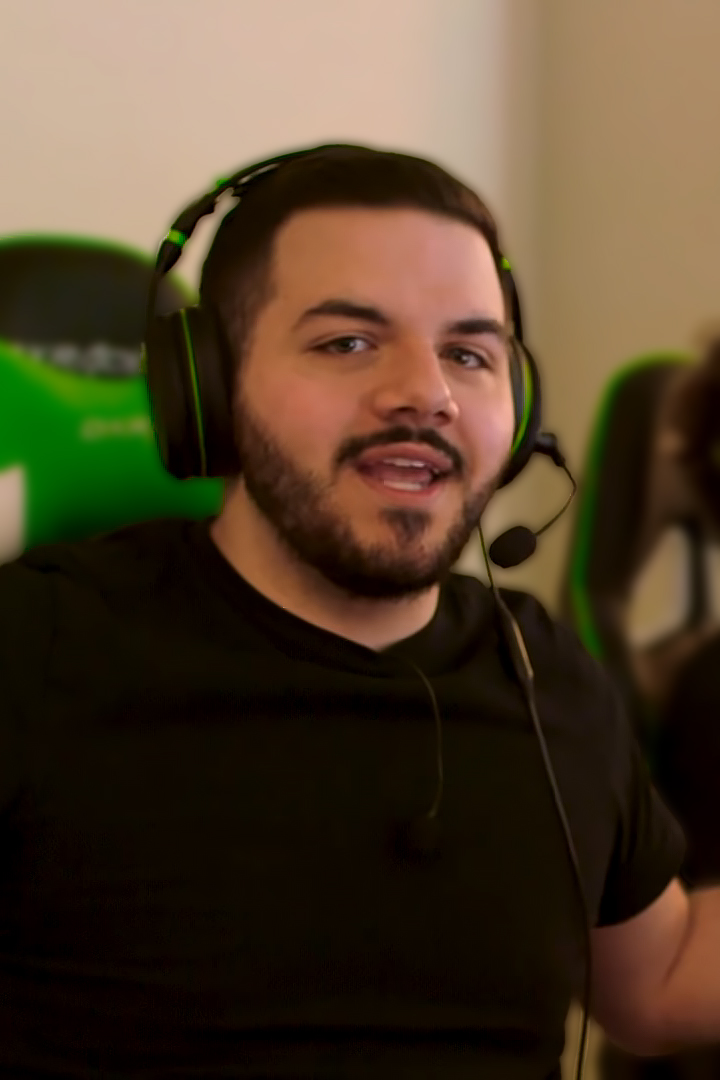
- Dunlop in 2018
- Born: Jack Dunlop; April 23, 1994 (age 32); New Jersey, U.S.
- Other name: CouRage
- Education: Towson University (B.A.)
- Occupations: YouTuber; streamer
- Organization: 100 Thieves

Twitch information
- Channel: CouRageJD
- Years active: 2013–2019; 2024–present
- Genres: Gaming; Let's Play
- Followers: 2.4 million

YouTube information
- Channel: CouRage
- Years active: 2015–present
- Genres: Gaming; vlogging; Let's Play; commentary; reaction
- Subscribers: 4.64 million (main channel)
- Views: 1.2 billion (main channel)
- Last updated: March 26, 2026
- Website: courage.gg

Jack Dunlop (born April 23, 1994), also known as his pseudonym CouRageJD or CouRage, is an American YouTuber, commentator and streamer. He is the co-owner of the esports organization and lifestyle brand 100 Thieves, where he also serves a content creator. He was also featured on Fortnite with his own skin and includes his pet dog, Louis as a sidekick.

== Early life ==
Jack Dunlop was born on April 23, 1994, in New Jersey, where he grew up with his sister. He graduated from Towson University with a degree in Electronic Media and Film.

== Career ==
Dunlop created his Twitch account in 2013, but didn't start streaming until 2018.

Dunlop began his career playing Halo and eventually won an internship at MLG through various contacts and friends that he had made through the game. During his career at MLG, he was chosen to host the daily MLG live show as a replacement for his colleague Chris Puckett, who was unwell. According to the league, Dunlop "did such a good job" that he was later permitted by the league to co-host for the next six weeks. From 2014 through 2018, Dunlop hosted and cast many major Call of Duty esports events including the Call of Duty World League Championship in 2016, 2017, and 2018, MLG tournaments Pro League in 2014, 2015, and 2016, and UMG tournaments in 2015 and 2016.

On March 2, 2018, he announced his transition from MLG to the Call of Duty franchise. On March 12, he signed with OpTic Gaming as a content creator. In November, he left OpTic to pursue a solo career.

On April 20, 2019, it was confirmed that Dunlop would be both casting and playing in the Fortnite World Cup. On June 16, Dunlop took part in the Fortnite Pro-Am 2019, partnering with celebrity Brendon Urie.

On May 28, 2019, Dunlop was announced as a content creator for and official member of esports organization 100 Thieves. Although the secret was leaked a few days before the announcement by Ninja, his signing had been suspected by his fanbase, as he was already living in the team's content house with friends and fellow streamers Matthew "Nadeshot" Haag and Rachell "Valkyrae" Hofstetter.

After developing an online friendship with artist Ariana Grande, Dunlop went on to make a parody of Ariana Grande's song "Boyfriend", to which she replied, "You're perfect." Dunlop and his girlfriend were also featured in Grande and Justin Bieber's music video "Stuck with U".

On November 4, 2019, Dunlop announced his switch from streaming on Twitch to streaming on YouTube through a comedic skit featuring other 100 Thieves house members. He cited reasons like stability and "the fear of being tied down just for a sub count button", along with other factors like conveying a wider range of content, as the main reasons for his departure from the platform. On April 23, 2020, during a twelve-hour charity birthday stream with the purpose of raising money for coronavirus relief, Dunlop received a total of $250,000 in donations within the first four hours of the stream and ended the stream with approximately $503,254 donated to the CDC.

On April 7, 2021, Dunlop was announced as a co-owner of 100 Thieves alongside Hofstetter. They join Scooter Braun, Dan Gilbert, Drake, and Haag. As co-owners, Hofstetter and Dunlop will receive equity in the company, which Forbes magazine recently valued at $2.2 million.

On June 9, 2022, Dunlop appeared in the Fall Guys segment of Mediatonic's Summer Game Fest 2022 trailers as himself.

On November 1, 2024, Dunlop announced that he would be simulcasting his livestreams on both YouTube and Twitch.

== Filmography ==
=== Television ===
Year	Title	Role	Notes	Ref.
2022	Alpha Betas	Best Buy Manager	2 episodes	

=== Music videos ===
Year	Title	Artist(s)	Ref.
2020	"Stuck with U"	Ariana Grande and Justin Bieber	
2021	"Inferno"	Bella Poarch and Sub Urban	

== Awards and nominations ==
Year	Ceremony	Category	Result	Ref.
2019	The Game Awards	Content Creator of the Year	Nominated	
2023	Forbes 30 Under 30	Games	Included	
