= Millie B (British rapper) =

British rapper (born 2000)

- Born: 24 April 2000 (age 26); Blackpool, England
- Occupations: Rapper; Social Media Personality
- Years active: 2016–present
- Children: 1

Millie Bracewell (born 24 April 2000), known professionally as Millie B, is a British rapper whose song "M to the B" went viral in 2020 after Bella Poarch performed a lip sync to it.

== Discography ==
List of singles as lead artist, showing year released and originating album
Year	Title	Album
"M to the B"	2016	Non-album singles
"Back Again"	2016	Non-album singles
"Get a New Jacket"	2017	Non-album singles
"About That"	2017	Non-album singles
"Kissa Dossier"	2020	Non-album singles
"We Wanna Know"	2021	Non-album singles
"My Battle"	2021	Non-album singles
"Meant to Bee"	2023	Non-album singles
"Always Bee My Reason"	2023	Non-album singles
"Right by My Side"	2024	Non-album singles
"Tango Blast"	2024	Non-album singles
"In My House" w/ "Sluggy Beats"	2025	Non-album singles

== Early and personal life ==
Bracewell was born in Blackpool, England, on 24 April 2000, to a single mother. She has one brother.

During a TikTok video posted in 2024, Bracewell revealed she has a daughter.

== Career ==
=== "M to the B" ===
Bracewell achieved viral fame after Bella Poarch also went viral for lip-syncing her 2016 song, "M to the B".

=== Controvesies ===
In January 2024, the UK's Advertising Standards Authority officially banned four of Millie B's TikTok videos for irresponsibly trivialising cosmetic surgery.

As a member of the Blackpool grime scene, Bracewell was criticised for encouraging young school children to trade highly explicit, vulgar, and personal insults for views. She has since apologised for her past behavior.

== Filmography ==
Year	Title	Role	Notes
2021	WWE's the Bump	Self	1 episode
