= Bretman Rock =

Filipino and American social media personality (born 1998)

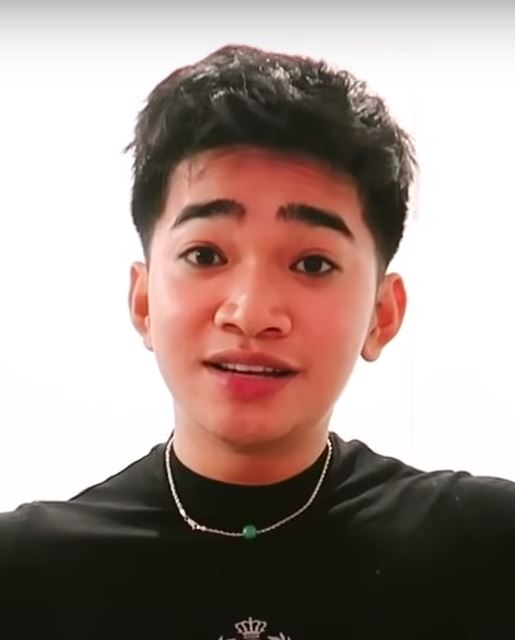
- Rock in 2019
- Born: Bretman Rock Sacayanan Laforga; July 31, 1998 (age 28); Sanchez-Mira, Cagayan, Philippines
- Occupations: YouTuber; makeup artist
- Agent: Adober Studios (2016)

YouTube information
- Channel: Bretman Rock
- Years active: 2012–present
- Subscribers: 8.76 million
- Views: 634 million
- Last updated: March 29, 2026

Bretman Rock Sacayanan Laforga (born July 31, 1998) is a Filipino and American beauty influencer and social media personality based in Honolulu, Hawaii. He (Note: Rock is non-binary and has no preferred pronouns. This article uses he/him for consistency.) rose to fame as a creator on YouTube and Vine after one of his contouring videos went viral in 2015. Rock is known for making makeup tutorials and his humorous views on life. He has starred in his own reality TV show, MTV's Following: Bretman Rock (2021), has featured in several music videos, and in October 2021, was the first openly gay man to appear on the cover of Playboy.

Rock has received multiple awards and honors for his work on social media including a People's Choice award for "Beauty Influencer" and an award for "Breakthrough Social Star" at the 2021 MTV Movie and TV Awards.

== Early life ==
Bretman Rock Sacayanan Laforga was born on July 31, 1998, in Sanchez-Mira, Cagayan, Philippines, in an Ilocano family. His mother is Mercedita Sacayanan. His father, Edmund Laforga, was a fan of professional wrestling and named him after Bret Hart and The Rock.

Rock grew up Catholic. He said of his family, "they always knew I was gay" and "[have] always supported me." Rock's fascination with makeup began in the Philippines watching his grandmother put on makeup. Rock's parents divorced when he was a child, after his father's affair with the housekeeper. Rock moved to Hawaii at the age of seven. His family faced financial hardship and he failed a class because he could not afford school supplies. Rock played sports while growing up including baseball, soccer, cross-country, and volleyball. At Campbell High School, he was on the track team. Rock became an American citizen through naturalization.

== Career ==
Rock started as a comedian and meme creator on YouTube and Vine before shifting to vlogs and beauty tutorials. He is also known for his humorous views on life. In 2016, one of Rock's contouring videos went viral. He was inspired by vlogger Talia Joy and makeup artist Patrick Starrr. Also in 2016, he signed a management contract under ABS-CBN's Adober Studios, a creator network on social media owned by the Philippines' largest media conglomerate ABS-CBN Corporation.

His younger sister, Princess Mae, and her daughter, Cleo, and their cousin, Keiffer ("Miss K"), frequently appear in Rock's videos, such as for mukbang. His friend, Larry, and his former editor, Agatha Danglapin, also made several brief appearances in his videos. Though he rarely features other influencers on his channel, Rock has collaborated with James Charles, Bella Poarch, Nikita Dragun, and Chelsea Handler.

In 2017, Time magazine recognized him among the 30 Most Influential Teens. He was also included in Forbes "30 Under 30 Asia – Media, Marketing, & Advertising" list in 2018.

In June 2019, Rock was featured on the Pride Month cover of Gay Times. In September 2019, Rock attended his first New York Fashion Week where he collaborated with stylist Andrew Gelwicks.

Rock played the role of "The Playboy" in the ten-episode fourth season of the YouTube Premium web series Escape the Night, released in July 2019. In December 2019, MTV announced that Rock would be the star of the next season of the YouTube show, No Filter.

In Early 2020, Rock launched his makeup collection in collaboration with wet n wild cosmetics. He had a February 2020 press tour in Los Angeles with brands like Buzzfeed, Condé Nast, Hearst, and more, to promote the line.

On May 9, 2020, Rock appeared as a guest star on the third episode of James Charles' YouTube Originals series, "Instant Influencer". In November 2020, Rock launched his eyewear collection, specifically sunglasses, in collaboration with Dime Optics, a Los Angeles-based brand. He released six frames, four of which were launched at Dime Optics, while two were launched exclusively at Revolve.

On May 14, 2021, Rock had a cameo in Bella Poarch's music video for her debut single, "Build a Bitch", alongside other internet personalities. In June 2021, Rock was nominated for an MTV Movie and TV Award for the Breakthrough Social Star category. He was announced as the winner on the day of the ceremony.

In August 2021, Rock made a cameo appearance in the music video for Sub Urban and Bella Poarch's song, "INFERNO". He also participated in a stream promoting the video.

In October 2021, Rock became the first openly gay man to feature on the cover of Playboy magazine. He collaborated with Wanderlust Creamery in 2023 to create an ice cream flavor, "Da Fruity Salad", in celebration of Filipino American History Month.

In a 2023 interview with Them magazine, Rock said he left the beauty community in 2021 because "white people ruined" it, as it became a "money industry" with widespread drama and apologies among its members.

=== MTV Following: Bretman Rock ===
On January 28, 2021, MTV announced that Bretman Rock would be starring on his own reality TV show titled MTV Following: Bretman Rock. On February 9, 2021, the first episode of his show premiered on MTV's official YouTube channel. Episodes of the show were released every Monday with six episodes in total. The show was filmed in Hawaii, where Rock is also based, and includes "a glimpse into [his] family life". The cast of the show is made up of Rock and his family alongside his close friends.

No.	Title	Original release date	Online viewers (millions)
1	"A Single Bretman Rock Saddles Up For A New Adventure"	February 8, 2021	6.564
2	"Bretman Rock Opens Up About His Father's Death"	February 15, 2021	6.530
3	"Bretman Rock Faces His Biggest Fear"	February 22, 2021	4.977
4	"It's Bretman Rock's Party & He'll Cry If He Wants To"	March 1, 2021	4.144
5	"Bretman Rock Goes Bottoms Up"	March 8, 2021	3.577
6	"Bretman Gets His Mom 'Lei'd' "	March 15, 2021	3.933

=== 30 Days With: Bretman Rock ===
On June 15, 2021, YouTube Originals announced that Rock would be the next subject of their 30 Days With documentary series franchise, as he tries to survive a week in the Hawaiian jungle while on his own. Four episodes were released on Wednesday nights on YouTube, from June 30 to July 21, 2021.

No.	Title	Original release date	Online viewers (millions)
1	"Is Bretman Rock Moving to the Jungle?"	June 30, 2021	2.983
2	"Can Bretman Rock Survive the Jungle Alone?"	July 7, 2021	1.766
3	"Will Hunger Kill Bretman Rock?"	July 14, 2021	1.475
4	"Can Bretman Rock Escape The Jungle?"	July 21, 2021	1.042

== Personal life ==
Rock is Catholic. He is gay and non-binary (using he/she/they pronouns). In a September 2019 interview with Elle, Rock shared that he was in his first relationship. In 2024, Rock revealed he was in a new relationship with a boyfriend, whom he met in a club. He has numerous pets: five dogs, four cats, two guinea pigs, three turtles, forty-five chickens, and one rooster. His dogs include four pit bulls named Kala, Ajax, Tora, and Ele, as well as a French Bulldog named Itah. He had another French bulldog named Lila that died. Five of his chickens are named Marites, Martin, Cristina, Cockiana, and Tin (short for Tinola). His rooster is named Bo (short for Adobo). His guinea pigs are named Wut and Ewa. His cat Shookira gave birth to a litter of three: Eissa, U'ah, and Aimah. His three turtles are named Ula Rocky, Banana Q, and Lumpia. A portion of the proceeds from Rock's merchandise goes to the Aloha Aina Support Fund, a Hawaiian wildlife charity that helps save turtles.

In November 2019, Rock's father died after being in a coma. His mother, Mercedita, and niece, Cleo, appear in his videos occasionally. Rock is Ilocano.

In April 2020, Rock requested on social media that fans not visit his home uninvited, especially during the COVID-19 pandemic, after two people knocked on his door and left a note on his car.

In February 2023, Harper published Rock's memoir titled You're That Bitch.

== Filmography ==
Year	Title	Role	Notes	Ref.
2019	Escape the Night season 4	The Play Boy	Main role; all episodes	
2020	Instant Influencer with James Charles	Himself	Guest star; episode 3: "I have to apologize for this"	
2021	MTV Following: Bretman Rock	Himself	Lead role; MTV series	
2021	30 Days With: Bretman Rock	Himself	Lead role; YouTube series	
2022–23	The Proud Family: Louder and Prouder	Makeup Boy (voice)	Episodes: "Bad Influence(r)" and "BeBe"	
2023	Drag Race Philippines	Himself	Guest judge; Episode: "The Main Event"	

== Awards and honors ==
Rock was a finalist for the Shorty Award for Breakout YouTuber in 2017. Time recognized him as one of the "30 Most Influential Teens" in 2017, and he was included in the Forbes "30 Under 30 Asia – Media, Marketing, & Advertising" list in 2018. In 2019, Rock won the Beauty Influencer award at the 45th People's Choice Awards. In 2020, he was a finalist in comedy video at the Shorty Awards. In 2020, Rock was included on Variety's 2020 Power of Young Hollywood list.

Year	Award ceremony	Category	Nominee(s)/work(s)	Result	Ref.
2019	People's Choice Awards	Beauty Influencer	Himself	Won	
2021	MTV Movie and TV Awards	Breakthrough Social Star	Himself	Won	
2021	Streamy Awards	Show of the Year Unscripted Series of the Year	30 Days With: Bretman Rock	Won	
2022	GLAAD Media Award	Outstanding Reality Program	MTV's Following: Bretman Rock	Nominated	
2022	WOWIE Awards	Best Instagram	Himself	Nominated	
