= Franc Péret =

Franc Péret is a French cameraman, director and photographer. He is a specialist on Asia.

== Biography ==
=== 1996–2007 ===
Péret began working in France as a freelance photographer from 1987 for motorsport (Moto Journal, Moto Crampons, Moto1) and travel magazines. Between 1994 and 1995 he did much work for the magazines L’étudiant and Biba.

From 1994 to 1996, he mostly spent his life in Taipei, working as a still photographer in the movie industry. During those intensive two and a half years, Péret learned film-making in the field, getting closer to the position of assistant director and finally director of photography.

In 1995, Péret was invited by the director Wang Tong to be the stage photographer for the movie Hong Shizi (Red Kaki).

From 1998 to 2003, he set up his life in Japan, writing and shooting travel report for Japanese magazines (Hot Bike Japan, Goggle, BMW bike, Garrr...) and for the leading motorcycle magazine in France, Moto Journal, read by more than 35,000 every week.

Settled in Asia, Péret shot the short movie Summers (Leon Dai's first movie) and won the prize for the best first movie at the 2001 Taiwan Golden Horse Award. The movie was honored during the Clermont-Ferrand Short Movie Festival.

After two years back in France to lead two major motorcycle magazines as chief editor of Moto Crampons and Freestyle Motocross, Péret decided to gradually go back to Asia by setting up his new activities as film and commercial director/cameraman in Shanghai.

Additionally, Péret created a photography course and a filmmaking course in Shanghai as part of the Expat Learning Center (ELC Shanghai). Due to his pioneering involvement, he became the most experienced photography teacher in Shanghai and the first to set up a filmmaking class which already released 3 short movies: "Hidden Talent", "Serial Denatist" and "Dysfunction".

Since 2006, Péret shot and realized six short movies, mainly in Shanghai, where he currently lives.

In 2007 his short movie Mosquito Killer was honored at the Shanghai Short Movie Festival.

=== 2008–2014 ===
Since 2008 Péret has worked for Sygma Corbis as a photographer. He was invited to photograph Karen Mok and Jay Chou for a Toyota advertisement.

He was invited to film the first Fête de la Musique (French Music Festival) in Shanghai in 2010. The same year, Péret shot and realized an MTV-style music video of "Shanghai" for the French singer Dantes Dailiang, The clip was shot in two versions, one in French and Chinese, one in Chinese. The music video was broadcast on Chinese television and is played in Shanghai clubs.

In 2014, the Expat Learning Center in Shanghai suddenly stopped its activities. Péret is continuing his teaching in photography and filmmaking by building up his own structure through his website.

== Short films ==
- Mosquito Killer (2007) – shot in Shanghai, 15 minutes
- Never Alone Again (2008) – shot in Shanghai, 10 minutes
- Hidden Talent (2010) – shot in Shanghai, 10 minutes
- Serial Dentist (2010) – shot in Shanghai, 1 minute
- Double Detente (2010) – shot in Switzerland, 2 minutes
- Marlene (2011) – shot in Shanghai, 7 minutes
- Dysfunction (2011) – shot in Shanghai, 6 minutes
- Revol’verte (2011) – shot in France, 10 minutes
- Finger Up (2012) – shot in Shanghai, 5 minutes
- La Deuche From Hell (2012) – shot in France, 5 minutes
- Sweet and Sour, My Ex-Girl Friends (2012) – shot in Shanghai, 3 minutes
- W(M)atching Future (2013) – shot in Shanghai, 4 minutes
- L'annonce (2013) – shot in France, 7 minutes
- 12th Floor (2013) – shot in Shanghai, 5 minutes

== Music videos ==
- 2010: Shanghai (single) by Dantès Dailiang
- 2012: Oh ma Chérie by Dailiang
- 2014: Douce Chine by Dailiang
- 2017: Wo Ai Bulietani by Dailiang
