= French Mandopop =

Music genre

- Stylistic origins: Manopop, French Pop, Chanson
- Cultural origins: Late 2000s, France, China, Taiwan

French Mandopop (Chinese: 法式华语流行音乐) is a subgenere of mandopop that characterized by the fusion of French pop music sensibilities with lyrics in Mandarin Chinese. The earliest mentions of the French Mandopop category appeared in 2007 following the release of artist Dantès Dailiang's album Parfums d'extrêmes.

== Characteristics ==
French Mandopop is characterized by the following features: French speaking singers who perform in Mandarin Chinese, with instrumentation and lyrical themes and imagery borrowed from Chanson and other French Pop music genres. French Mandopop is also characterized by a French way (or western way) of performing on stage with little reference to Chinese visual aesthetics.

== History ==
=== 2000s: Origins ===
The pioneer of French Mandopop and sinologist, Dantès Dailiang (Chinese: 戴亮), is credited with being the first native French musical artist who sings in Mandarin Chinese to be signed by a Chinese record company for his albums Parfums d'extrêmes (Chinese: 我记得你) in 2007 and Dailiang (Chinese: 下有戴亮) in 2009. Another key figure in the development of the French Mandopop genre is Djang San (born Jean-Sébastien Héry in Bordeaux, France). During a trip abroad to Shanghai, he connected with musical acts of the Beijing underground. In contrast to Dailiang, his musical style includes the use of traditional Chinese instruments such as the zhongruan.

=== 2010s: Rise in Popularity ===
In 2010, as part of French Pavilion Day at the Shanghai World Expo, France launched the Fête de la Musique, global event dedicated to celebrating the summer solstice and music in 350+ cities, for the first time in China. Along with free concerts and street performances, the festival commenced with a performance by a choir of 500 children from the city's local French language school.

On June 14 2017, French singer Joyce Jonathan ( Chinese: 喬伊絲) released Ça Ira = 守護幸福 (精選+新歌) under the label Universal Music Taiwan, an album of her greatest hits sung in Mandarin. In an interview with France 24 to promote the album and her upcoming Asia tour, she explained her childhood spent living in China, decision to take Mandarin as a language class in school, and the growing international music scene in the country as an inspiration. She has gone on multiple tours across Asia, including in the years 2017 and 2024.

=== 2019-Present ===
Dantès Dailiang joins musician Chinese-born musician Eva Wren to create the duet act, Eva & Dantes and release a self-titled album in 2019 under the Plaza Mayor Company label. According to his personal website, Dantès noted that after meeting Eva while performing in China, "the two artists wanted to create a duet that was missing in the Franco-Chinese musical world." Following their debut album, they have released the single Young and Happy in Sanya (2021), the EP Shan De Liwu (2022), and single Le Rêve (一个梦) (2022).

== Labels ==
- Mainland China: Jiesheng Records
- Hong Kong, Taiwan, Europe: Plaza Mayor Company, Warner, Universal Music Taiwan

== Artists ==
- Dantès Dailiang
- Jil Caplan
- Joyce Jonathan
- Djang San (Jean-Sébastien Héry; also known as Zhang Si'an)
- Frederick

== See also ==
- Chinese music
- C-pop
- Mandopop
