= List of ABS-CBN Corporation subsidiaries =

ELJ Communications Center, the company's headquarters in Quezon City

This is a list of subsidiaries owned by ABS-CBN Corporation, a Philippine media and entertainment company based in Quezon City, which are business sectors owned and operated by the media company.

== Subsidiaries ==
Corporate name	Place of incorporation	Principal activities	Percentage of ownership
ABS-CBN Center for Communication Arts, Inc./Showbiz Magic, Inc. (Star Magic)	Philippines	Education/Training	100%
ABS-CBN Convergence, Inc.	Philippines	Telecommunications	69.3%
ABS-CBN Interactive, Inc. (ABS-CBN Digital Media/Digital Media Division)	Philippines	Online and interactive media	100%
Media Serbisyo Production Corporation	Philippines	Broadcasting and digital media	49%
ABS-CBN Film Productions, Inc. (Star Cinema/ABS-CBN Films)	Philippines	Film production and distribution	100%
ABS-CBN Global Ltd.	California, United States	Holding company	100%
ABS-CBN Publishing, Inc.	Philippines	Print publishing	100%
ABS-CBN Studios, Inc.	Philippines	Production facility	100%
Creative Programs, Inc.	Philippines	Content development and distribution	100%
Sarimanok News Network, Inc.	Philippines	Content development and distribution	100%
Star Recording, Inc. (Star Music/Star Records/ABS-CBN Music)	Philippines	Music recording	100%
Sky Cable Corporation	Philippines	Telecommunications	59.4%
ABS-CBN Foundation (ABS-CBN Foundation, Inc.)	Philippines	Social responsibility	100%
ABS-CBN Bantay Bata	Philippines	Social responsibility	100%

=== Affiliates ===
Here is a list of affiliates where ABS-CBN holds economic interest:

Corporate name	Place of incorporation	Principal activities	Percentage of interest
Daum Kakao (Philippines) Corporation	Philippines	Services - messaging app	50%
One Music X Festival	International	Festival	100%

=== Defunct subsidiaries ===
- ABS-CBN Consumer Products, Inc. (consumer products)
- ABS-CBN Europe Societa Per Azioni (financial services)
- ABS-CBN Hong Kong, Ltd. (services)
- ABS-CBN Multimedia, Inc. (known as ABS-CBN (Kapamilya) Games and Get Amped/Amped Casual Games, third-party video games distribution for the Philippine market such as Cronous Pilipinas, Ragnarok Online, N-Age, Tantra Online, War Rock, and selected games produced and/or distributed by American video game company PopCap Games)
- ABS-CBN Sports and Action (sports television channel that replaced Studio 23 in January 18, 2014, signed off on May 5, 2020 due to shutdown of the company's free-to-air operations)
- Cinemagica, Inc. (theatrical and amusement services)
- Culinary Publications, Inc. (print publishing, merged to ABS-CBN Publishing, Inc.)
- Creative Creatures, Inc. (services - creature effects, makeup, prosthetic, props, puppetry)
- GMO Entertainment Unit (production company, replaced by RCD Narratives)
- Kapamilya Tickets (audience ticket booking, closed November 30, 2025 and now redirect to the main ABS-CBN website since then)
- KidZania Manila (indoor family entertainment, closed due to the losses amid the COVID-19 pandemic in the country)
- Hong Kong Club, Ltd.
- O Shopping (pay television channel, ceased operations on November 1, 2020)
- Pinoy Auctions (auction website)
- Restaurant 9501 (closed on August 1, 2020)
- Shopping Network, Inc. (consumer products)
- Roadrunner Network, Inc. (post production, merged to ABS-CBN Film Productions, Inc.)
- Sky Films, Inc. (foreign film distribution)
- Studio 23, Inc. (content development and distribution, became ABS-CBN Sports and Action from January 18, 2014 to May 5, 2020)

=== Former affiliations ===
- AMCARA Broadcasting Network (broadcasting) - sold its 49% stake to Rodrigo V. Carandang in 2019.
