= Whatcharawalee =

WhatChaRaWaLee (Thai: วัชราวลี) is a Thai retro soul-pop band. The band is well known in Thailand for many Thai songs, such as Jeep, Look-Om, and Avenue.

== History ==
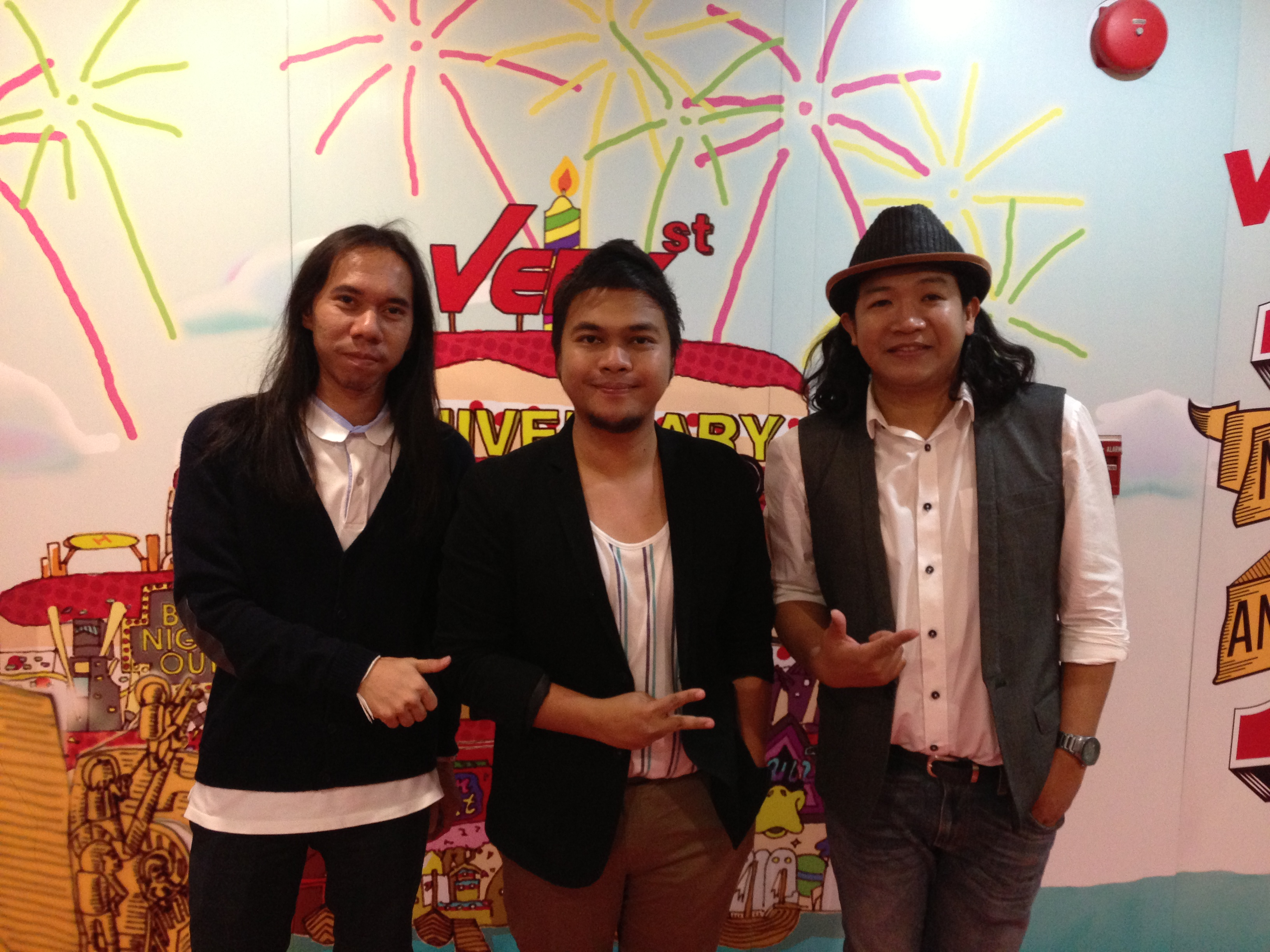
WhatChaRaWaLee at VERY TV in 2013

WhatChaRaWaLee was established by friends who worked behind the scenes in Thai music and Thai advertising. Their purpose is to present music about strong love or positive thinking. The name of their band came from their first single in 2009. They wanted to create a song for a woman who was getting married, so they used her name as their band name and her nickname became the title of their first song.

== Members ==
The band has four members: Pom (lead vocalist), Milk (guitarist), Joop (drummer), and New (bass guitarist).

== Songs ==
They have published eight well known songs; อเวนิว (Avenue), จี๊ป (Jeep), ถนนบนต้นไม้ใหญ่ (Ta Non Bon Ton Mai Yai: Road on the big tree), ทราย (Saii: Sand), ผมคือเวลา (Pom Keu Vela: I am time), ฟอเวิร์ด (Forward), ร่มสีเทา (Rom See Tao: Gray umbrella), ลูกอม (Look-Om: Candy), ทะเลลิฟท์ (Ta Le Lift: Elevator sea), น้อย (Noi: A few), แฟ (Fair, Factor)

WhatChaRaWaLee is still together and has become well known in Thailand.
