= ABS-CBN Digital Media =

Digital media division of ABS-CBN Corporation

ABS-CBN Interactive, Inc.
- Trade name: ABS-CBN Digital Media; Digital Media Division
- Type: Division
- Industry: Internet; Digital media New media
- Founded: February 1999; 27 years ago
- Headquarters: ABS-CBN Broadcasting Center, Diliman, Quezon City
- Area served: Worldwide
- Key people: Jaime Lopez (Head, Digital); Dennis Lim (Head, Digital Media Services)
- Products: Chicken Pork Adobo iWant news.ABS-CBN.com
- Revenue: PHP781 million (FY 2016)
- Parent: ABS-CBN Corporation

ABS-CBN Interactive, Inc. (doing business as ABS-CBN Digital Media and Digital Media Division) is the digital media and internet division of ABS-CBN Corporation. The division was formerly a separate company operating as a wholly owned subsidiary of ABS-CBN until 2013, when it merged to its parent.

ABS-CBN Digital Media is responsible for overseeing all of ABS-CBN-related websites and social media accounts, mobile and web applications, and the distribution of ABS-CBN's contents (TV channels, audio channels, TV programs, films, music recordings, music videos, images, magazines, books, news, etc.) to digital and online space as such they are owned, operated, managed, and held responsible by ABS-CBN Corporation.

The division has made many first in Philippine media, such as the first ever TV network website (ABS-CBN.com launched in 1995), the first ever Filipino news website (news.ABS-CBN.com launched in 1997), and the first Filipino video streaming website (ABS-CBN Now! launched in 2003; now known as iWant). In 2017, the company was the largest in digital media platforms in the Philippines.

== History ==
ABS-CBN Digital Media was originally part of ABS-CBN's IT department labeled as the Interactive Media Group (IMG). The group was formed and initiated by Victoria Ferro. After three years of business development and consistent production of new forms of digital media, the IMG was spun off to a separate subsidiary of the ABS-CBN Broadcasting Corporation. ABS-CBN Interactive, Inc. was formally incorporated in February 1999 with Victoria Ferro as Founder and managing director. By the time of incorporation, ABS-CBN Interactive had already pioneered many forms of digital media used today including live streaming and other mobile value added services. ABS-CBN Interactive was officially established to manage and grow ABS-CBN's digital presence and to monetize ABS-CBN's contents on cyberspace. Later that same year, Carlo Katigbak was appointed as the subsidiary's new managing director.

Together with its sister company's TV Production team, ABS-CBN Interactive's mobile business started out with the game show, Game KNB? (pronounced as "Game Ka Na Ba?", literally "Are You Game?"), where TV audiences can join through their mobile phones. The company continued to offer mobile value-added services with content sourced from ABS-CBN and its subsidiaries as well as other third-party content companies. A java mobile game was also developed based on Game KNB? game show.

In 2005, ABS-CBN Interactive, in partnership with ABS-CBN Global Ltd., launched the award-winning and the first Filipino online video streaming service TFC Now! This service allowed audiences around the world to watch ABS-CBN's programs anytime and anywhere via the internet.

ABS-CBN Interactive then formed a subsidiary, ABS-CBN Multimedia, Inc., to handle MMORPG business. ABS-CBN Multimedia acquired licenses of online video games from abroad and marketed it in the Philippines as Get Amped. Some of the games offered by Get Amped include Tantra Online created by Hanbitsoft of Korea, Ragnarok Online, War Rock, Cronous Pilipinas, and N-Age. This service was later discontinued due to financial difficulties and poor reception.

In 2011, ABS-CBN Interactive, together with Creative Programs and SKYcable, launched the Philippines' first user-generated interactive cable channel called CgeTV. This channel was later discontinued due to the poor reception.

In 2008, ABS-CBN Interactive signed a five million dollar deal with the global social networking site Multiply. The deal granted ABS-CBN Corporation to own as much as 5% of the global social networking site. This deal was proven to be fruitless as Multiply was later dissolved due to financial difficulties and the assets and property of the company redistributed.

In 2013, ABS-CBN Interactive, Inc. was merged to its parent ABS-CBN Corporation. The ABS-CBN Digital Media name was then adapted and is now overseen by Donald Patrick Lim as its Chief digital officer and Dennis Lim as the Head of Digital Media Services. However, the ABS-CBN Interactive name is still used nowadays on certain contexts. Today, ABS-CBN Digital Media is responsible for overseeing all of ABS-CBN Corporation's websites and mobile applications. It is operated under the ABS-CBN Access segment of ABS-CBN Corporation headed by Antonio Ventosa.

ABS-CBN's official social media accounts on Facebook, Twitter, YouTube, and TikTok (mainly It's Showtime) are among the most influential in the Philippines. ABS-CBN Entertainment's YouTube channel is the first-ever Filipino content creator on YouTube to gained an aggregate views of 1 billion and the most viewed, most subscribed YouTube channel in Southeast Asia surpassing Thailand's WorkpointTV. Among the social media accounts managed by ABS-CBN Digital Media are ABS-CBN Entertainment (ABS-CBN's main account across social media, with over 21 million likes and 31 million followers on Facebook, 1.6 million followers on Twitter, and with over 2.6 million followers on Instagram, over 36.7 million subscribers and over 44.1 billion views on YouTube), ABS-CBN News (over 7.6 million followers on Twitter; 19.2 million likes on Facebook; over 13 million subscribers and 8.4 billion views on YouTube), ABS-CBN Starmusic (over 6.29 million subscribers and over 2.5 billion views on YouTube), ABS-CBN Star Cinema (over 4.03 million subscribers and over 1.2 billion views on YouTube), The Voice Kids Philippines (over 2.63 million subscribers and over 1.4 billion views on YouTube), The Voice of the Philippines (with over 3.7 million likes on Facebook; over 903 thousand subscribers and over 542 million views on YouTube), Myx (with over 7.5 million likes on Facebook; over 6.7 million followers on Twitter), and It's Showtime (with over 11.2 million likes on Facebook). ABS-CBN.com, the official generic website of ABS-CBN, is currently one of the top websites in the Philippines and is the top Filipino website in the country.

== Digital properties ==
Name	Type/Platform	Current status	Note(s)
ABS-CBN Corporation (corporate.ABS-CBN.com, investors.ABS-CBN.com, and governance.ABS-CBN.com)	Website, Facebook and Twitter (as ABS-CBN PR/ABS-CBN Integrated Corporate Communications), YouTube (as ABS-CBN Entertainment)	Active	Websites intended for use by ABS-CBN Corporation as such used for corporate purposes. ABS-CBN Corporate Governance and Investor Relations provide the media company's operations, structure, status, inquiries, and documents about corporate activities including of ABS-CBN Foundation division. ABS-CBN Corporate, however, is its main website where aside from uses on the two previously mentioned websites, it also provides the updates or news, including showbiz, of the media company as a whole through ABS-CBN Integrated Corporate Communications (with it is also covered by its namesake network and ABS-CBN News).
ABS-CBN.com	Website, Facebook, Twitter, YouTube (as ABS-CBN Entertainment)	Active	The generic website. Among the top websites in the Philippines; the top Filipino website in the world. The most viewed Filipino channel on YouTube.
news.ABS-CBN.com; ABS-CBN News	Website, Facebook, Twitter, YouTube, android, iOS, Windows, LG Smart TV	Active	Among the top Facebook publishers in the world. News contents are provided by ABS-CBN News.
Feel Good Studios (formerly Adober Studios / Chicken Pork Adobo)	Website, Facebook, Twitter, Multi-channel network on YouTube	Active (re-launched as Feel Good Studios; July 22, 2022)	The website only serves as an advertisement for the service. Multi-channel network in YouTube which has over 90 content creators each designed for specific niche market.
Chalk Magazine, Star Studio Magazine, FOOD Magazine Philippines, Metro Magazine Philippines, Metro Home Magazine, Working Mom Magazine, Metro Weddings Magazine, Vault Magazine, Star Magic Catalogue 2015	Website (for Metro Magazine only), Facebook, Twitter, iOS	Active	Digital versions of the magazines owned by ABS-CBN Publishing available for iOS smartphones and tablet PCs.
iWant	Website, Android, iOS, Windows, Samsung Smart TV, Amazon Fire TV, Roku, Apple TV, Vewd, Vidaa, Telstra, Android TV	Active	Over-the-top content platform available in the Philippines and globally.
MYX Charts	android and iOS	Active	Displays the results of the 3 weekly Myx music video charts and has the ability to share the chart on Facebook or Twitter. Also has a voting capability.
NoInk	Website, android, and iOS	Active	A reading app designed for ABS-CBN Publishing.
One Music PH	Website and social media	Active	Music and video streaming and downloading website.
Patrol.ph	Website	Active	A Filipino-language news website
Push; Push Showbiz News; Push-Mobile	Website, Facebook, Twitter, android and iOS	Active	Entertainment, showbiz, and gossip news.
Kapamilya Online Live	Facebook, YouTube	Active	entertainment shows from Kapamilya Channel and Jeepney TV.
Digital Advertising Self-serve Hub (DASH)	Website, Facebook, Twitter	Active	Do-it-yourself (DIY) advertising tool for businesses.
ABS-CBN Radio Service	iOS, Android	Active	Mobile application for digital audio platforms, in partnership with Zeno Media. Contains audio livestreaming of TeleRadyo, MOR Entertainment and MyxRadio, as well as podcast versions of newscasts from ABS-CBN News and ANC.

== Defunct (formerly) or inactive products and services ==
- CgeTV - was a user generated interactive cable channel.
- Choose Philippines - website about the Philippines developed by ABS-CBN Regional.
- COMELEC Halalan 2016 - known as COMELEC Halalan 2016 mobile app ("COMELEC App") released on android and iOS, it was created by ABS-CBN aims to allow the public access to election-related information and services through mobile phones and devices. It allows a Filipino voter to check the status of his registration and eligibility for elections, assists him in locating his precinct or polling place, and provides him with information and news related to the then-upcoming 2016 Philippine elections.
- Get Amped/Amped Casual Games (ABS-CBN Games/ABS-CBN Multimedia) - distributor of games made by third-party companies for the Philippine market.
  - Cronous Pilipinas
  - Ragnarok Online
  - N-Age
  - Tantra Online
  - War Rock
  - selected games produced and/or distributed by American video game company PopCap Games.
- Hero - content and updates on anime, Japanese pop culture, and eGames. Formerly an anime cable channel operated by sister company Creative Programs from 2005 to 2018.
- Multiply (5%) - was a global social networking site.
- PasaHero - A passenger safety app on android and iOS released in 2013. This mobile app safeguards the user (passenger) by broadcasting trip details to social media and, through the panic button, sending emergency notifications and location to the user's trusted circle and to relevant agencies for assistance.
- PinoyCentral - the precursor of ABS-CBN Digital Media.
- DOST Project NOAH - mobile device application was jointly developed by the Department of Science and Technology-Nationwide Operational Assessment of Hazards (DOST-NOAH) and ABS-CBN for iOS only (other platforms are released by Smart Communications). It aims to give mobile device users information such as probability of rain, typhoon forecast, images from multi-functional transport satellites, rainfall amount, temperature, images from Doppler stations and recordings from weather stations, stream gauges and rain gauges — essentially giving users access to crucial hazards information right at their fingertips.
