= Adober Studios =

Filipino YouTube multi-channel network

- Company type: Joint venture
- Available in: English, Filipino
- Dissolved: August 31, 2020; 6 years ago
- Area served: Worldwide
- Owner: ABS-CBN Digital Media
- Key people: Donald Patrick Lim
- Industry: Social media
- Website: chickenporkadobo.abs-cbn.com
- Launched: September 15, 2014; 12 years ago (as Chicken Pork Adobo)
- Current status: Defunct

Adober Studios, formerly known as Chicken Pork Adobo, was a YouTube multi-channel network owned and operated by Filipino media conglomerate ABS-CBN Corporation. It was the country's first and only YouTube-certified multi-channel network.

== Background ==
Initially, Chicken Pork Adobo had 90 content creators whose channels on YouTube tackle a variety of topics ranging from toys and games, fashion, comedy, music, lifestyle, vlogs, entertainment, arts and crafts, food, parenting, and inspirational. Among the YouTube channels under Chicken Pork Adobo was Kids' Toys which was launched in May 2012 and was currently the network's biggest channel. Also part of the network's content creators are Lloyd Cafe Cadena† who became popular in social media because of his funny videos and memes about love, school, as well as pop culture parodies, social media influencer Daniel Ian, actor Xian Lim, actor JC De Vera, actress Melissa Ricks, former Rugby player and comedian/host Eric Tai, and artist manager and tabloid writer Ogie Diaz. Another channel under the network was The Soshal Network starring three lawyers with entertaining commentaries on how to become a socialite and Plump Pinay by Cai Cortez who advocates of being comfortable of your own body. Also part of Chicken Pork Adobo was Kitchen Queen (later renamed as Chef Liza) of Liza Diño. As of August 2016, Chicken Pork Adobo had over 300 content creators. Among the newest content creators were Bretman Rock, Kristel Fulgar, Alexa Ilacad, and Andrea Brillantes. As of 2017, the network had over 350 content creators.

Adober Studios ceased its operations on August 31, 2020, as part of the retrenchment by ABS-CBN Corporation, due to the denial of ABS-CBN's legislative franchise by the House of Representatives on July 10, 2020.
