= Hive (album) =

Studio album by Sub Urban
- Released: June 3, 2022
- Length: 25:17
- Label: Warner
- Producers: Elie Rizk; Karm The Tool; Sub Urban

Sub Urban chronology
| Thrill Seeker (2020) | Hive (2022) | If Nevermore (2025) |

Singles from Hive
- 1. "Inferno" Released: August 13, 2021; 2. "Paramour" Released: November 19, 2021; 3. "Uh Oh!" Released: April 22, 2022; 4. "Candyman" Released: May 13, 2022

Hive is the debut studio album by American singer-songwriter Sub Urban. It was released on June 3, 2022 through Warner Records, and features guest appearances from Aurora, Benee, WHOKILLEDXIX, and Bella Poarch. The album was preceded by the singles "Inferno", "Paramour", "Uh Oh!", and "Candyman".

== Background ==
The album was released on June 3, 2022, featuring guest appearances from Aurora, Benee, WHOKILLEDXIX, and Bella Poarch. The album was preceded by the singles "Inferno", "Paramour", "Uh Oh!", and "Candyman".

In an interview with 1883 Magazine, Sub Urban teased the album, saying:

It's dark, but there's a new level of whimsy. It's playing on a vintage sound, there's a bit of Latin and French influence in there sonically. There's just as much experimentation with sound; there's a bit of manic cynicism to it, but there's always something fun that comes with playing with cynicism, wouldn't you say?

== Track listing ==
Hive track listing
| No. | Title | Length |
|---|---|---|
| 1. | "Virgil's Mania" | 1:49 |
| 2. | "Bandit" | 3:09 |
| 3. | "Paramour" (featuring Aurora) | 2:48 |
| 4. | "Uh Oh!" (with Benee) | 2:13 |
| 5. | "Diamond" | 2:56 |
| 6. | "Whitewall" (featuring WHOKILLEDXIX) | 2:02 |
| 7. | "Candyman" | 2:44 |
| 8. | "Inferno" (with Bella Poarch) | 2:13 |
| 9. | "Rabbit Hole" | 3:08 |
| 10. | "Hedon" | 2:15 |
| Total length: | | 25:17 |
