= M to the B =

Song by Millie B
- Released: 3 December 2016
- Genre: Bassline, electro-hop
- Length: 2:05
- Songwriters: Millie Bracewell, Dean Williams
- Producer: Jack Wilkinson

Music video
- "M to the B" on YouTube

"Soph Aspin Send", commonly known as "M to the B", is a 2016 bassline song created by British rapper Millie Bracewell, known as Millie B.

It gained prominence after American social media personality Bella Poarch created a TikTok video of herself lip synching to the song in August 2020. The video was viewed more than 500 million times, making it one of the platform's most popular videos and the top video for 2020. As of February 2026, Bella Poarch's video was the second most liked video on TikTok with more than 70 million likes.

"M to the B"
The song originally called "Soph Aspin Send" became known as "M to the B" after the snippet heard in this 10-second sample went viral. The snippet became popular on TikTok after it was used in Bella Poarch's famous TikTok video where she lip-synced to the song. The bassline song's beats can be heard alongside Millie B's rap.

== Background ==
Millie B had said she had created the song as a "joke" rather than as a serious insult (which she made clear through the lyrics of some of her later songs). She had created the song when she was 16 years old. At that time, she was a member of Blackpool's grime community, and had a rivalry with Sophie Aspin. The song's backing track is an instrumental called "Skank" by Bordum Beats.

== Lyrics and music video ==
The song is a diss track against fellow Blackpool music artist, Sophie Aspin. It uses several profanities, calling Aspin a "slag".

The music video was filmed and originally released in December 2016, then re-released in September 2020 with TikTok clips of people using the song throughout the video garnering over 20 million views by May 2024, takes place in Blackpool, with scenes filmed at a local KFC and a Lidl supermarket.

== Chart performance ==
The song became number one on the Spotify chart in the UK in 2020, thanks to the spread on TikTok. It was also number five on the worldwide Spotify chart. The song had been used in almost 7 million TikToks in 2020.

The song, along with other viral TikTok songs, was part of the 2022 album TikTok Classics, where viral TikTok songs were re-recorded by the Babelsberg Film Orchestra of Germany.
