= 2021 UK Music Video Awards =

- Date: 4 November 2021
- Location: Roundhouse, London
- Website: www.ukmva.com

The 2021 UK Music Video Awards were held on 4 November 2021, at the Roundhouse in London to recognise the best in music videos and music film making from United Kingdom and worldwide, unlike last year's ceremony, the ceremony for this year is expected to be live.

The nominations were announced on 29 September 2021, a new category named Best Performance in a Video was included while the category Best Styling in a Video was split into and Best Hair & Make-up in a Video and Best Wardrobe Styling in a Video. British rapper Little Simz led the nominations with five, followed by Skrillex, Starrah & Four Tet with four each, all for their collaboration "Butterflies".

Electronic music duo Duck Sauce won Video of the Year for "Mesmerize", directed by Keith Schofield. Producer Juliette Larthe received the Outstanding Achievement Award.

== Video of the Year ==
Video of the Year
- Duck Sauce – "Mesmerize"
  (Director: Keith Schofield)

== Video Genre Categories ==
Best Pop Video - UK	Best Pop Video - International
Dua Lipa – "Love Again" (Director: Lope Serrano); Joy Crookes – "Feet Don't Fail Me Now" (Director: Taz Tron Delix); Arlo Parks – "Hope" (Director: Molly Burdett); Mabel – "Let Them Know" (Director: Isaac Rentz); Maisie Peters – "Psycho" (Director: Louis Bhose); Little Mix – "Sweet Melody" (Director: KC Locke)	Lil Nas X and Jack Harlow – "Industry Baby" (Director: Christian Breslauer); Saweetie – "Fast (Motion)" (Director: James Larese); Selena Gomez and Rauw Alejandro – "Baila Conmigo" (Director: Nogari); Bella Poarch – "Build a Bitch" (Director: Andrew Donoho); Lolo Zouaï – "Galipette" (Director: Amber Grace Johnson); Lil Nas X – "Montero (Call Me by Your Name)" (Director: Tanu Muino)
Best R&B/Soul Video - UK	Best R&B/Soul Video - International
Celeste – "Tonight, Tonight" (Director: Noah Lee); Samm Henshaw – "All Good" (Director: Max Weiland); Disclosure featuring Kehlani and Syd – "Birthday" (Director: Kid. Studio); Jorja Smith featuring Shaybo – "Bussdown" (Director: Fenn O'Meally); Tendai – "Not Around" (Director: Hector Dockrill); Wesley Joseph featuring Jorja Smith – "Patience" (Director: Wesley Joseph)	Normani x Cardi B – "Wild Side" (Director: Tanu Muino); Bryson Tiller – "Always Forever" (Director: Kid. Studio); Beyoncé, Blue Ivy, Saint Jhn, Wizkid – "Brown Skin Girl" (Director: Jenn Nkiru); Doja Cat – "Streets" (Director: Christian Breslauer); the Weeknd – "Take My Breath" (Director: Cliqua); Witch Prophet – "Tesfay" (Director: Leah Vlemmiks)
Best Dance/Electronic Video - UK	Best Dance/Electronic Video - International
Hot Chip, Jarvis Cocker – "Straight to the Morning" (Director: Réalité); Goodboys & Imanbek – "Goodbye" (Director: Charlie Robins); Jungle – "Keep Moving" (Directors: J Lloyd & Charlie Di Placido); Public Service Broadcasting featuring EERA – "People, Let's Dance" (Director: Chloe Hayward); Rudimental x Skream – "So Sorry" (Director: Iain Simpson); Eli Brown – "Trouble" (Director: Brock Neal-Roberts)	Duck Sauce – "Mesmerize" (Director: Keith Shofield); Skrillex, Starrah & Four Tet – "Butterflies" (Director: Ben Strebel); MK – "Chemical" (Director: Aube Perrie); Salvatore Ganacci – "Fight Dirty" (Directors: Will Goodfellow, Tom Noakes & Greg Sharp); rysy – "Kilo" (Director: Filip Zaluska); Salvatore Ganacci – "Step-Grandma" (Director: Vedran Rupic)
Best Rock Video - UK	Best Rock Video - International
Beabadoobee – "Last Day On Earth" (Director: Arnaud Bresson); Sam Fender – "17 Going Under" (Director: Brock Neal-Roberts); Doves – "Broken Eyes" (Director: Colin Read); Frank Carter and the Rattlesnakes featuring Lynks – "Go Get a Tattoo" (Director: Thomas Davis); Wolf Alice – "How Can I Make It Ok" (Director: Jordan Hemingway); shame – "Nigel Hitter" (Director: Maxim Kelly)	Biting Elbows – "Boy is Dead" (Director: Ilya Naishuller); Hedgehog – "Bat" (Director: Haonan Wang); The Academic – "Kids (Don't End Up Like Me)" (Directors: Ronan Corrigan & Hope Kemp); The Parrots, C. Tangana – "Maldito" (Director: Rogelio); Space Chaser – "Remnants of Technology" (Director: Feedz); Trash Talk – "Something Wicked" (Director: Derek Schklar)
Best Alternative Video - UK	Best Alternative Video - International
James Blake – "Say That You Will" (Director: Bear Damen); Kelly Lee Owens featuring John Cale – "Corner of My Sky" (Director: Karper Hȁggström); Paul McCartney featuring Beck – "Find My Way" (Director: Andrew Donoho); Texas featuring Wu Tang – "Hi" (Director: Fenn O'Meally); Bakar – "Noun" (Director: Machine Operated); Steven Wilson featuring Elton John – "Personal Shopper" (Director: Lucrecia Taormine)	Sansara – "We Will Become Better" (Director: Andzej Gavriss); Eels – "Are We Alright Again" (Director: Greg Barnes); BadBadNotGood – "Beside April" (Director: Camille Summers-Valli); Cuco – "Forevermore" (Director: Cliqua); Phoebe Bridgers – "I Know the End" (Director: Alissa Torvinen Kouame); Mcht – "Unknown World" (Director: Aisultan Seitov)
Best Hip Hop/Grime/Rap Video - UK	Best Hip Hop/Grime/Rap Video - International
Pa Salieu featuring Backroad Gee – "My Family" (Director: Femi Ladi); Bree Runway featuring Missy Elliott – "ATM" (Director: Lucrecia Taormina); slowthai featuring James Blake and Mount Kimbie – "Feel Away" (Director: Oscar Hudson); Little Simz – "Introvert" (Director: Salomon Ligthelm); Aitch – "Learning Curve" (Director: KC Locke); Kano – "Teardrops" (Director: Aneil Karia)	Megan thee Stallion – "Thot Shit" (Director: Aube Perrie); Vladimir Cauchemar – "Brrr" (Director: Quentin Deronzier); Tyler, the Creator – "Corso" (Director: Tara Razavi); Pharrell featuring Jay-Z – "Entrepreneur" (Director: Calmatic); Travis Scott featuring Young Thug & M.I.A. – "Franchise" (Directors: Travis Scott, White Trash Tyler & Jordan Hemingway); Tommy Cash – "Racked" (Director: Anna Himma)
Best Pop Video - Newcomer	Best R&B/Soul Video - Newcomer
Drew Sycamore – "45 Fahrenheit Girl" (Director: Jonathan Eghold Keis); Elsa y Elmar – "Corazones Negros" (Director: Daniel Uribe); Nick Wilson – "Lead Me to the Water" (Director: Franklin & Marchetta); Between Friends – "Lonely" (Director: Kevin Clark); Terno Rei – "Medo" (Director: Vira-Lata); Yma – "White Peacock" (Director: Gui Bohn)	Bamao Yendé & Le Diouck – "Marvin Gaye" (Director: Vincent Catel); Odeal – "24/48" (Director: Chris Chuky); Preditah featuring wtsrn – "Distant Memory" (Director: Chirolls Khalil); Mykki Blanco – "Free Ride" (Director: Hannah Rosselin); Mansur Brown – "My Prayer" (Director: Filmawi); Eddy Luna – "Still Breathing" (Director: Waxxwork)
Best Dance/Electronic Video - Newcomer	Best Rock Video - Newcomer
Modeselektor – "Mean Friend" (Director: Abigail Wilson); Welshy – "All for You" (Director: Arthur Studholme); Fred again.. – "Dermot (See Yourself in My Eyes)" (Director: Loose); Jimothy Lacoste – "Describe My Life" (Director: Stanley Brock); Not Waving featuring Marie Davidson – "Hold On" (Director: Angelo Cerisara); Elderbrook – "Why Do We Shake in the Cold" (Director: Jára Moravec)	Jeremy Ivey – "Someone Else's Problem" (Director: Kimberly Stuckwisch); The Bluestocking – "Never Ready" (Director: Egor Gavrilin); TV Priest – "Press Gang" (Director: Joe Wheatley); Middle Kids – "r u 4 me?" (Director: W.A.M. Bleakley); Dry Cleaning – "Scratchcard Lanyard" (Director: Rottingdean Bazaar); El Columpio Asesino – "Sirenas de Mediodía" (Director: Amar Hernández)
Best Alternative Video - Newcomer	Best Hip Hop/Grime/Rap Video - Newcomer
Audiobooks – "Lalala It's the Good Life" (Director: Rottingdean Bazaar x Annie Collinge); Tiberius B – "Big Deal" (Director: Saskia Dixie); Tycho Jones – "Don't Be Afraid" (Director: Edd Carr); Califato ¾ – "Fandangô de Carmen Porter" (Director: Nono Ayuso); Memorial – "Hero's Death (Cover)" (Director: Jake Dypka); Lava La Rue – "Magpie" (Director: Milo Blake)	Homeboy Sandman – "Monument" (Director: Pavel Buryak); Kam-Bu x Knucks – "Call Me Back" (Director: Jay Green); Kaydy Cain – "Hollywood" (Director: Miguel Angulo); Jeshi – "Look Like Trouble" (Director: Brock Neal-Roberts); Ichon featuring Yseult – "Mélange" (Director: Sophie Jones); Enny featuring Amia Brave – "Peng Black Girls" (Director: Otis Dominique)

== Craft and Technical Categories ==
Best Performance in a Video	Best Production Design in a Video
Salvatore Ganacci – "Step-Grandma" (Performer: Salvatore Ganacci); Jerome Farah – "Concrete Jungle Fever" (Performer: Jerome Farah); Kelly Lee Owens featuring John Cale – "Corner of My Sky" (Performer: Michael Sheen); Berwyn – "I'd Rather Die that Be Deported" (Performer: Berwyn); James Blake – "Say That You Will" (Performers: James Blake Litherland & Finneas Baird O'Connell); Kano – "Teardrops" (Performer: Kano)	DJ Snake & Selena Gomez – "Selfish Love" (Production Designer: Taísa Malouf); Rag'n'Bone Man – "All You Ever Wanted" (Production Design: David Hamilton); Disclosure featuring Kehlani and Syd – "Birthday" (Production Design: R. Tyler Evans); London Grammar – "Lose Your Head" (Production Design: Lora Venkova); Celeste – "Tonight, Tonight" (Production Design: Elena Isolini); Loyle Carner – "Yesterday" (Production Design: Charlotte King)
Best Wardrobe Styling in a Video	Best Hair & Make-up in a Video
Joy Crookes – "Feet Don't Fail Me Now" (Stylists: Matthew Josephs, Natalie Roar); Beyoncé, Blue Ivy, Saint Jhn, Wizkid – "Brown Skin Girl" (Stylists: Grace Ellington & Sharon Robertson); Priya Ragu – "Chicken Lemon Rice" (Stylist: Neesha Tulsi); Trouble Wanted – "Lonely Cowgirl" (Stylists: Jackie Pratt & Ghonorious Reese); Tommy Cash – "Racked" (Stylist: Ronalds Peterkops); Little Simz featuring Cleo Sol – "Woman" (Stylist: Luci Ellis)	Joy Crookes – "Feet Don't Fail Me Now" (Make-up Artist: Mata Marielle; Hair Stylist: Isaac Poleon); Biting Elbows – "Boy is Dead" (Special Effects: Anna Kudevich); Anaiis featuring Topaz Jones – "Chuu" (Hair Stylist: Regina Meessen); Ashnikko – "Deal with It" (Key Make-up Artist: Zaheer Sukhnandan; SFX Make-up Department Head: Allison McGillicuddy; Key SFX Make-up: Malina Stearns; Additional SFX Make-up: Meg Wilbur; Key Hair Stylist: Preston Wada; Additional Hair Stylist: Adriana Pina); Rachel Chinouriri – "Plain Jane" (Hair: Shamara Roper; Hair Assistant: Chaniqua Brown; Make-up: Georgia Hope; Make-up Assistant: Cat Gibbons); Little Simz featuring Cleo Sol – "Woman" (Hair Stylist: Chantelle Fuller; Make-up: Nibras)
Best Choreography in a Video	Best Cinematography in a Video
Purple Disco Machine featuring Moss Kena & The Knocks – "Fireworks" (Choreographer: Adam Beta); fka twigs, Headie One, Fred again.. – "Don't Judge Me" (Choreographers: Theo TJ Lowe, Dominant Namek, Dom Dumaresq, Samuel Mak, Ndongo Faye); Lil Nas X and Jack Harlow – "industry baby" (Choreographer: Sean Bankhead); Little Simz – "Introvert" (Choreographer: Kloe Dean); black midi – "John L" (Choreographer: Nina McNeely); S+C+A+R+R – "Never Give Up" (Choreographer: Nicolas Huchard)	Califato ¾ – "Fandangô de Carmen Porter" (Director of Photography: Michael Babinec); Skrillex, Starrah & Four Tet – "Butterflies" (Director of Photography: Ben Todd); Simon Leoza – "La Nuée" (Director of Photography: Alexandre Nour); Pa Salieu featuring Backroad Gee – "My Family" (Director of Photography: Stefan Yap); Bicep featuring Clara La San – "Saku" (Director of Photography: Pat Aldinger); Mcht – "Unknown World" (Director of Photography: Anatoliy Trofimov)
Best Color Grading in a Video	Best Editing in a Video
Bastille – "Distorted Light Beam" (Colourist: Alex Gregory); Megan thee Stallion – "Thot Shit" (Colourist: Matt Osborne at Company3); Jerome Farah – "Concrete Jungle Fever" (Colourist: Fergus Rotherham at Fin Design & Effects); Dua Lipa featuring Angèle – "Fever" (Colourist: Jason Wallis at ETC); Eli Brown – "Trouble" (Colourist: Richard Fearon at Black Kite Studios); The Academic – "Kids (Don't End Up Like Me)" (Colourist: Vlad Barin at Cheat)	Little Simz – "Introvert" (Editor: Elise Butt at Trim Editing); Skrillex, Starrah & Four Tet – "Butterflies" (Editor: Matt Nee at Metal); Duck Sauce – "Mesmerize" (Editor: Keith Schofield); Bicep featuring Clara La San – "Saku" (Editor: Sophie Fourdinoy); Megan thee Stallion – "Thot Shit" (Editors: Émilie Aubry & Niles Howard); Enfant Sauvage – "Time to Fall" (Editor: Nicolas Larrouquère at Poster)
Best Visual Effects in a Video	Best Animation in a Video
Bicep featuring Clara La San – "Saku" (VFX Artist: Alexis Baillia at Firm Studio); Ed Sheeran – "Bad Habits" (VFX Artist: Ingenuity Studios); Belly, the Weeknd and Young Thug – "Better Believe" (VFX Artist: Sergii Mashevskyi ay Cameo FX); Skrillex, Starrah & Four Tet – "Butterflies" (VFX Artists: Tobin Brett, James Belch & James Sindle at Electric Theatre Collective); Darius featuring Duñe – "Feels Right" (VFX Artist: Joaquin Cuervo, Daniel Gomez, Sergi Soley & Marc Bitrián at Sauvage.tv); Fuel Fandango – "Mi Huella" (VFX Artist: Eighty4)	L'Impératrice – "Hématome" (Animators: Roxanne Lumeret, Jocelyn Charles, Chloé Farr); easy life – "A Message to Myself" (Animators: Hozen Britto, Frankie Swan, Bishoy Gendi, Yino Huan, Andy Baker); Duck Sauce – "Mesmerize" (Animator: Keith Schofield); Squid – "Pamphlets" (Animators: Raman Djafari, Barney Abraham); Iron Maiden – "The Writing on the Wall" (Animators: Blinkink); Run the Jewels – "Walking in the Snow" (Animators: Chris Hopewell, Cadi Catlow, Jacky Howson)

== Special Video Categories ==
Best Live Video	Best Special Video Project
Pa Salieu – "Frontline (Live in Jimmy Fallon)" (Director: Tawbox); Lous and the Yakuza – "Amigo" (Live in Jimmy Fallon) (Director: Tawbox); Fontaines D.C. – "A Hero's Death" (Live in Jimmy Fallon) (Director: Sam Taylor); Wolf Alice – "Lipstick on the Glass (Union Chapel)" (Director: Libby Burke Wilde); the Weeknd – "Save Your Tears (Billboard Awards)" (Director: Alex Lill); Michael Kiwanuka – "Solid Ground (Live at The V&A)" (Director: Raja Virdi)	Topaz Jones – "Don't Go Tellin' Your Momma" (Directors: Rubberland. & Topaz Jones); Berwyn – Berwyn Video Series: "100,000,000 Miles", "I'd Rather Rie Than Be Deported", "Money Comes Money Goes" (Director: Loose); Wolf Alice – Blue Weekend (Director: Jordan Hemingway); Sam Dew – Moonlit Fools (Director: Young Replicant); Olivia Rodrigo – Sour Prom (Directors: Kimberly Stuckwisch & Toby I); Kano – "Teardrops" (Director: Aneil Karia)
Best Music Film
Dua Lipa – Studio 2054 (Director: Liz Clare); Andrea Bocelli & Guests – Believe in Christmas (Director: Giorgio Testi); Liam Gallagher – Down by the River Thames (Directors: Oscar Sansom & Phil Woodhead); Glass Animals – Glass Animals: Live in the Internet (Directors: James Barnes & Dave Bayley); Imogen Goldie-Wells & Charlotte Hatherley – Imogen (Director: Lola Young & Matt Shea); Rone & (La)Horde – Room with a View (Directors: Josselin Carré & Célidja Pornon)

== Individual and Company Categories ==
Best Director	Best New Director
Tanu Muino; Arnaud Bresson; Brock Neal-Roberts; Dave Meyers; Kc Locke; Kid. Studio	Aube Perrie; Bedroom; Femi Ladi; Jordan Hemingway; Lucrecia Taormina; Nono
Best Commissioner	Best Producer
Kat Cattaneo; Daniel Millar; Elena Argiros; Kim Jarrett; Marco Grey; Sam Seager	Precious Mahaga; Elizabeth Doonan; Ersan Beskardes; Joseph J. Goldman; Maurizio von Trapp; Mayling Wong
Best Production Company	Best Post-Production Company
CANADA; Agile Gilms; London Alley; Object & Animal; Pulse Films; Somesuch	Electric Theatre Collective; Cheat; Ingenuity Studios; MPC; Stitch/Homespun; Trim
Best Agent	Outstanding Achievement Award
Sam Davey (ob management); Alexa Haywood (free agent); Claire Stubbs (Mouthpiece); Estere Sulca (wpa); Lee Fairweather (Compulsory); Sarah Boardman (Hands ldn)	Juliette Larthe
