= Dantès Dailiang =

Dantès Dai Liang
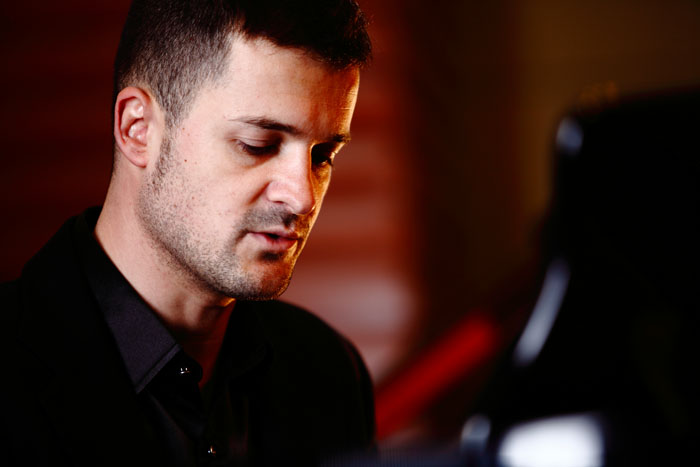

Background information
- Also known as: Dantès, Dai Liang, 戴亮
- Born: Christophe Hisquin; 1978 (age 47–48); Voiron, France
- Genres: French Mandopop, Pop, Rock
- Occupations: singer-songwriter, presenter, actor, writer, producer
- Instruments: Vocals, guitar, piano, organ
- Years active: 2001-2023
- Labels: Jiesheng, Plaza Mayor, Yiwen Publishing, Editions Lugdivine, Editions DAILIANG

Dantès, or Dai Liang is a French singer-songwriter. He is also a trilingual host (French, Chinese, English) and a writer.

Dantès is an intercultural artist who intertwines Chinese language, the French way of thinking and pop rock. Dantès' LP, One of a Kind, allowed the French singer and pioneer of the French Mandopop to be invited several times to the most prestigious and popular TV shows in China.

== Biography ==
=== 2005-2011 ===
In 2006 he released a double album entitled Parfums d'extrêmes or Wo jide ni 我记得你 in Mandarin Chinese. The same year, the album was distributed in China. In 2007, Dantès was signed and distributed by Jiesheng Record Company.

The Chinese media readily welcomed the sinologist. Since 2006 several media have considered Dantès as the first foreigner who writes and sings his own songs in Chinese.

In April and May 2007, various press conferences were organized for Dantès in Suzhou and Hangzhou, and the artist was mentioned during the television news.

Furthermore, in January 2007 Dantès was interviewed by the famous host Yi Wen during the Zui ai K ge bang 最爱K歌榜 program in Shanghai Love Radio. Suzhou, Hangzhou and the French Radio of Beijing (RCI) organized long interviews (over an hour each) of Dantès.

In the year 2008 Dantès was invited by the French Television France 3 to talk about his experience and cultural matters. French media started to focus on Dantès work. At the end of the year, Dantès completes his PhD about the Music Industry in China at the Lyon Jean Moulin University.

In 2009 Dantès released Dailiang with the Chinese record company Jiesheng. It was his second Chinese-French album. Dantès includes traditional Chinese music aspects to his pop rock tunes: dizi flute, erhu violin, Beijing Opera. The album is distributed the same year in France with the Mosaic music label. Dantès is often invited to perform at the International Channel of Shanghai ICS. He also became a host at the Channel Young, a Chinese TV Channel. The same year, Dragon TV broadcast Xia you Dailiang, a Dantès cover story. At the end of 2009 Dantès also organize a concert in France and was interviewed by the French media.

In 2010 Dantès released Shanghai (single) and Franc Péret shoots a MTV of it.

The same year, Dantès was invited by the French Consulate to perform during the first Shanghai French Music Festival (Fête de la musique) and was promoted as the French man who writes and sings in Chinese. Dantès was interviewed by French journalists who came to cover the 2010 Shanghai Expo. Dantès stands as an ambassador of French culture toward Chinese people along as French politician Jack Lang. Numerous Chinese journalists interview the singer. One of the most complete interviews was the one he gave at the Shanghai Expo Site CCTV Studio.

He was invited by the Suzhou Television to perform his hit Liang qian nian wo lai dao Zhongguo. Dantès comes back another time to the English Channel of Shanghai (ICS) as a guest of Cultural Matters Show, where he talks about Beijing Opera and performs his song La muse aux lèvres rouges. In June, Dantès performed at the Shanghai Music Festival for the second time. Between July and August, he recorded 3 television shows for the Shanghai Media Group where he sings in Shanghainese dialect and reach more fans. Dantès performed at the 2011 Shanghai French Week with the guitarist Inophis, who is also his friend. He performed a show in France, at the Kbox of Villeurbanne, near the city of Lyon and he was interviewed by le Progrès newspaper

In October, Dantès worked on a song with the composer Peter Kam. The song was recorded for Garou who performed the same month a show in the city of Nanning in China.

In 2011 Dantès got more and more opportunities to work as a Master of Ceremonies. He co-presented with the famous host Sujing, the 2011 Chinese Culture Foreign Talents Show for the Suzhou Television. He was selected to host the YesHJ program Ohlala.

=== 2020-2023 ===
In January 2020, Dantès performs in Hainan Island for the Wenzhou Chamber of Commerce. Back to France on mid-January and before going on stage for a show in Brittany, the pandemic is starting in China. France Bleu Breizh is interviewing him about it.

The singer is invited by CGTN to sing a song with Joyce Jonathan and Jean-françois Maljean in order to encourage Chinese health workers.

The French journal Le progrès interviews Dantès about his life between China and France. The singer gives interviews to several musical blogs.

In March 2020, Dantès releases on Chinese music platforms Young and Happy in China with his Chinese duo Eva & Dantes.

Confined in France, Dantès uses this opportunity to release the Douce Chine album. The LP is supported by two crowdfundings, one in China, one in France.

In April, Dantes starts a series of livestreams on western platforms: Facebook, YouTube and Instagram. The singer streams more than 500 livestreams between 2020 and 2021, reaching almost one million views during this period. Part of these livestreams are shared on Chinese platforms.

French radio France Bleau Isère interviews several times the singer during confinement.

In December 2020, the new French media created by Bernard de la Villardière, Neo, broadcast a short news story about Dantes.

In February 2021, Dantès hit the show Ça commence aujourd’hui on France 2, where he talks with Faustine Bollaert during more than twenty minutes about his China story. He sings two of his Mandarin top songs, Liangqiannian Wo laidao Zhongguo and Zhongguo de Faguoren. The show is a success and the program is replayed several times, on May 13, then on 2022.

In 2021, the video clip Zhongguo de Faguoren wins a prize during the Chinese Language Video Festival organized by United Nations and China Media Group.

In 2022, Dantès wins again a prize during the 2022 Chinese Language Video Festival with his video clip Shan de Liwu.

In 2023, Dantès releases his eighth studio album Pop Mandarine.

== Discography ==
- 2006 : Parfums d’extrêmes (China : Zhongguo kexue)
- 2007 : Parfums d’extrêmes (China : Jiesheng, Rest of the World : Plaza Mayor)
- 2009 : Dailiang (China : Jiesheng, Rest of the World : Plaza Mayor)
- 2010 : Shanghai (Single) (Ulys Music)
- 2012 : Oh ma Chérie (Single) (YesHj)
- 2015 : Douce Chine (Album) (Ulys Music)
- 2015 : J'aime la Maurienne (Single) (Rémi Trouillon)
- 2015 : Là-Haut (Single) (DAILIANG)
- 2016 : Moliyene (Single) (Rémi Trouillon)
- 2016 : Raison-Passion (Single) (DAILIANG)
- 2017 : Wo Ai Bulietani (Single) (Inophis)
- 2017 : Et si j'oubliais (Single) (Inophis)
- 2018 : J'aime la Maurienne (Album) (DAILIANG / Rémi Trouillon)
- 2018 : Partir Loin (Single) (DAILIANG)
- 2018 : Lyon même quand je suis loin (Single) (DAILIANG / Fux Cartel)
- 2018 : 魅力里昂 Meili Li'ang (Single) (DAILIANG / Fux Cartel)
- 2019 : Cette route (Single) (CGTN Français)
- 2019 : Douce Chine (Album) (Plaza Mayor)
- 2021 : Des cimes (Single) (Winko / Space Party Éditions)
- 2021 : 山的礼物 (Single) (Winko / Éditions DAILIANG)
- 2022 : 古典 (Single) (Pascal Gallet / Éditions DAILIANG)
- 2023 : Pop Mandarine (Album) (Winko / Éditions DAILIANG)
- 2025 : Huit Ba Eight (Album) (Winko / Éditions DAILIANG)

== Music Videos ==
- 2010 : Shanghai (上海) directed by Franc Péret
- 2010 : Shanghai, directed by Franc Péret
- 2012 : Oh ma chérie, directed by Franc Péret
- 2012 : Français de Chine (中国的法国人), directed by Jiangsu Television
- 2016 : Moliyene (莫里耶讷), directed by Rémi Trouillon
- 2016 : J'aime la Maurienne, directed by par Rémi Trouillon
- 2017 : Wo Ai Bulietani (我爱布列塔尼), directed by Franc Péret
- 2018 : Forever in Bo'ao (永远在博鳌), directed by Duran Du
- 2018 : В Боао навсегда (永远在博鳌), directed by Duran Du
- 2018 : Meili Li'ang (魅力里昂), directed by Franc Péret
- 2019 : Cette route, directed by CGTN (CCTV F)
- 2019 : Douce Chine, directed by Franc Péret
- 2021 : Des cimes, directed by par Widou
- 2021 : 山的礼物, directed by par Widou
- 2025 : Pop mandarine, directed by Mandarin TV
- 2025 : Cette route, directed by Cunchao Stadium

== Main TV Shows and Medias Appearances ==
- 2013 :
  - Xunzhao Xin zhubo, Presenter Contest broadcast in November on Henan Satellite
- 2015 :
  - Hello China, Show broadcast in July 2015 on Guangdong Satellite
- 2016 :
  - Surname, Program broadcast on Shanxi Satellite
- 2017 :
  - Le matin - Bretagne, Interview broadcast on November 16 on France 3 Bretagne
- 2018 :
  - La Gaule d'Antoine, Région Auvergne-Rhône-Alpes, Program broadcast on Canal+
- 2019 :
  - Ceinture et Route Grand Quiz, Program broadcast on CGTN, January
- 2019 :
  - Quoi de neuf en Chine, Interview broadcast on CGTN
- 2019 :
  - Luguo Beiwei 18°, Program broadcast on Hainan Satellite
- 2021 :
  - Ça commence aujourd'hui, Program broadcast on France 2
- 2022 :
  - China Eco, Program broadcast on BFM Business
- 2023 :
  - 茉莉花 Molihua, Program broadcast on CCTV 5
- 2024:
  - 读懂中国 Dudong Zhongguo, Program broadcast on CCTV 3 and CCTV NEWS
  - 60 ans, 60 regards, Interview broadcast on Mandarin TV
- 2025:
  - Ce jour-là, Interview broadcast on FRANCE 3
  - Business Club de France, Interview broadcast on CANAL 32
  - Cette route, Show broadcast on GUIZHOU SATELLITE
