= Parfums d'extrêmes =

Parfums d'Extrêmes (Chinese: 我记得你; pinyin: Wǒ jìdé nǐ) is the first solo album of Dantès Dailiang. The French-Chinese double album was released in 2006 with Kexue Records and distributed in China in 2007 with Jiesheng Records. The double album was noted by both Chinese media and French media as the first album written and performed in Mandarin Chinese by a Frenchman and then distributed throughout China.

== Track listing ==
=== CD1 ===
No.	Title	Length
1.	"我记得你"
2.	"你的爱到底给了谁"
3.	"只有她"
4.	"因为有爱"
5.	"两千年我来到中国"
6.	"留下许多情"
7.	"掉在你的路上"
8.	"我希望"
9.	"I still love you"
10.	"生命中的篇章"
11.	"有你伴我到明天"

=== CD2 ===
No.	Title	Length
1.	"Et si j'oubliais"
2.	"J'ai plus envie"
3.	"Eden"
4.	"Ivre là-bas"
5.	"Libre"
6.	"Ce soir"
7.	"Un homme sage"
8.	"C'est la seule"
9.	"I still love you"
10.	"Tayatimtim"
11.	"Je me souviens de toi"
