= Two Feet =

American musician and producer (born 1993)

- Born: Zachary William Dess; June 21, 1993 (age 33); Manhattan, New York City, U.S.
- Origin: Harlem, New York City, U.S.
- Genres: Electronic, alternative rock
- Occupations: Singer; songwriter; musician; producer
- Instruments: Vocals; guitar
- Years active: 2016–present
- Labels: AWAL, Republic

Zachary William "Bill" Dess, (born June 21, 1993), known professionally as Two Feet, is an American singer, songwriter, and producer from New York City.

== Education ==
He attended Tenafly High School in Tenafly, New Jersey.

== Career ==
Dess used to play locally in jazz and blues ensembles before forming Two Feet. After his single "Go Fuck Yourself" became a viral hit on SoundCloud, he signed with Republic Records. The single reached number 36 on the US Hot Rock Songs chart. His next single, "I Feel Like I'm Drowning", reached number one on the US Alternative Songs chart in 2018. On July 31, 2018, Dess attempted suicide and he was subsequently hospitalized, leading him to cancel his upcoming festival appearances. On October 5, 2018, Two Feet released his debut album A 20 Something Fuck, which featured the singles "I Feel Like I'm Drowning" and "Hurt People". On March 13, 2020, he released his second album Pink, and on April 16, 2021, he released his third album Max Maco Is Dead Right?. On May 13, 2022, he released his fourth album Shape & Form.

== Discography ==
=== Studio albums ===
- A 20 Something Fuck (2018)
- Pink (2020)
- Max Maco Is Dead Right? (2021)
- Shape & Form (2022)

=== Extended plays ===
- First Steps (2016)
- Momentum (2017)
- Drunken Fits of a Modern Age (2025)

=== Singles ===
==== As lead artist ====
List of singles as lead artist, showing year released, peak chart positions and album name
| Title | Year | Peak chart positions | | Certifications | Album |
| Title | Year | US Rock | US Alt. | Certifications | Album |
|---|---|---|---|---|---|
| "Go Fuck Yourself" | 2016 | 36 | — | RIAA: Gold | First Steps |
| "I Feel Like I'm Drowning" | 2017 | 13 | 1 | RIAA: Gold; ZPAV: 2× Platinum | A 20 Something Fuck |
| "Same Old Song (S.O.S., Pt. 1)" | 2018 | — | — | | A 20 Something Fuck |
| "Hurt People" | 2018 | — | — | | A 20 Something Fuck |
| "I Want It" | 2018 | — | — | | Non-album single |
| "Lost the Game" | 2018 | — | — | | Pink |
| "Pink" | 2019 | — | — | | Pink |
| "You?" | 2019 | — | 30 | | Pink |
| "BBY" | 2019 | — | — | | Pink |
| "Grey" | 2020 | — | — | | Pink |
| "Think I'm Crazy" | 2020 | — | 30 | | Max Maco Is Dead Right? |
| "Time Fades Away" | 2020 | — | — | | Max Maco Is Dead Right? |
| "Fire" | 2021 | — | — | | Max Maco Is Dead Right? |
| "Never Enough" | 2021 | — | — | | Max Maco Is Dead Right? |
| "I Want Love" (with Gryffin) | 2021 | — | — | | Non-album single |
| "Fire In My Head" | 2021 | — | — | | Shape & Form |
| "Devil" | 2021 | — | — | | Shape & Form |
| "Ella" | 2021 | — | — | | Shape & Form |
| "Don't Bring Me Down" | 2021 | — | — | | Shape & Form |
| "Until I Come Home" (with grandson) | 2021 | — | — | | Shape & Form |
| "Caviar" / "Amy" | 2022 | — | — | | Shape & Form |
| "Play the Part" / "My Life" | 2022 | — | — | | Shape & Form |
| "Tell Me the Truth" | 2022 | — | — | | Shape & Form |
| "I Want You Dead" (with Allie Cabal) | 2023 | — | — | | Non-album single |
| "Take Me Home" (with Bec Lauder) | 2023 | — | — | | Non-album single |
| "To My Knees" | 2023 | — | — | | Non-album single |
| "KILL ANYONE" (with Ari Abdul) | 2023 | — | — | | Non-album single |
| "Falling to Pieces" | 2024 | — | — | | Non-album single |
| "Lingerie" | 2025 | — | — | | |
"—" denotes a recording that did not chart or was not released in that territory.

==== As featured artist ====
List of singles as featured artist, showing artist names, year released, and album names
| Title | Year | Album |
|---|---|---|
| "Not Me" by MELVV (feat. Two Feet) | 2016 | Non-album singles |
| "Mercy" by MØ (feat. What So Not & Two Feet) | 2018 | Forever Neverland |
| "Drugs" by UPSAHL (feat. Two Feet) | 2020 | Non-album singles |
| "I Want Love" by Gryffin (feat. Two Feet) | 2021 | Non-album singles |
| "Part Time Psycho" by SHAED (with Two Feet) | 2021 | Non-album singles |
| "PATCHWERK" by Sub Urban (feat. Two Feet) | 2021 | Non-album singles |
| "Day By Day" by Frank Walker (feat. Two Feet) | 2022 | Non-album singles |
| "City" by Allie Cabal (feat. Two Feet) | 2023 | Non-album singles |
| "Hard to Get" by Bec Lauder (feat. Two Feet) | 2023 | Before Everything Changes |
| "More Than Chemical" by Bec Lauder (feat. Two Feet) | 2023 | Before Everything Changes |
| "Don't Stop" by Bec Lauder (feat. Two Feet) | 2023 | Before Everything Changes |
| "Cities" by Toby Mai (feat. Two Feet) | 2023 | Non-album singles |
