= Dailiang =

Dailiang (Chinese: 下有戴亮) is the second solo album of Dantès Dailiang. The double Chinese-French album was released in 2009 and distributed in China by Jiesheng Records and with Mosaic Label in France.

== Track listing ==
=== CD1 ===
No.	Title	Length
1.	"下有戴亮"
2.	"现在"
3.	"今晚我有一个梦"
4.	"Oh ma chérie (你的爱到底给了谁)"
5.	"过程还是目标"
6.	"属于幸福"
7.	"La muse aux lèvres rouges"
8.	"上海"
9.	"想起"
10.	"两千年我来到中国"
11.	"幸福满足感"
12.	"我记得你"
13.	"不知道"
14.	"合理自由"
15.	"两千年我来到中国 (不插电)"

=== CD2 ===
No.	Title	Length
1.	"Sur les ponts"
2.	"L'autre rive"
3.	"A trop vouloir"
4.	"Joie et satisfaction"
5.	"Ecrire"
6.	"Maintenant"
7.	"Et si j'oubliais"
8.	"La muse aux lèvres rouges"
9.	"Dark Ubles"
10.	"Oh ma chérie"
11.	"Liberté saine"
12.	"Shanghai"
13.	"Je me souviens de toi"
14.	"Au nom de la vertu"
15.	"Et si j’oubliais (version acoustique)"
