= Build a Bitch =

Single by Bella Poarch

from the EP Dolls
- Released: May 14, 2021
- Genre: Dark pop; pop
- Length: 2:02
- Label: Warner
- Songwriters: David Arkwright; Justin Gammella; Salem Ilese; Bella Poarch; Elie Rizk; Sub Urban
- Producers: David Arkwright; Justin Gammella; Stefan Max; Elie Rizk; Sub Urban

Bella Poarch singles chronology
"Build a Bitch" (2021)	"Inferno" (2021)

Music video
- "Build a Bitch" on YouTube

"Build a Bitch" is the debut single by Filipino and American internet celebrity Bella Poarch from her debut extended play, Dolls (2022). She wrote the song with Salem Ilese and its producers David Arkwright, Justin Gammella, Elie Rizk, and Sub Urban, with Stefan Max also receiving a producer credit. Warner Records released it on May 14, 2021 for digital download and streaming. After achieving success on TikTok, Poarch signed a record deal with Warner in May 2021 to launch her music career. A dark pop and pop track, Poarch has stated that the song is about one embracing oneself. A few music critics have suggested that it also contains feminist themes.

Upon release, "Build a Bitch" received positive reviews from music critics, who praised its sound. The song reached the top 10 in India, Malaysia, and Singapore. It also peaked within the top 30 in multiple countries, including Australia, Canada, and the United Kingdom. The song was awarded platinum certifications by the Recording Industry Association of America (RIAA) and Music Canada (MC) in the United States and Canada, respectively.

An accompanying music video directed by Andrew Donoho was released alongside the single. It features a factory similar to a Build-A-Bear Workshop where men can create their ideal woman. Various internet celebrities appear in the visual, including Valkyrae and Bretman Rock. The music video received nominations at the 2021 MTV Video Music Awards, 2021 UK Music Video Awards, and 2022 iHeartRadio Music Awards.

== Background and release ==
Prior to joining the online video platform TikTok, Poarch enrolled in the United States Navy when she was 20 and left it when she was 23. Poarch joined the platform in January 2020 and in August, she published the most-liked TikTok video, which depicts her lip synching to Millie B's "M to the B (Soph Aspin Send)". In May 2021, Poarch signed a record deal with Warner Records, stating in an interview with Billboard that she "feel[s] like [she] found [her] family and part of that family is the label" and how Warner "has helped" several artists which "meant the most to [her]", including Prince, Dua Lipa, and Madonna. "Build a Bitch" was released on May 14, 2021 by Warner for digital download and streaming in various countries. The aforementioned label also sent it for radio airplay in Italy on May 24 and to contemporary hit radio stations in the US on June 1.

== Composition and lyrics ==
Musically, "Build a Bitch" has been described as a dark pop and pop song. Poarch co-wrote it with Salem Ilese, Sub Urban, David Arkwright, Justin Gammella, and Elie Rizk, while the latter five produced it alongside Stefan Max. Jaycen Joshua mixed the track and Colin Leonard mastered it. Writing for The New York Times, Jon Pareles noticed that the track contains "tinkly toy-piano sounds" and "perky la-las" that "accompany [Poarch] as she points out that women aren't consumer products". Zoe Haylock from Vulture observed that Poarch sings the chorus "to the lilting lullaby beat". A hoax later went viral on TikTok, accusing Poarch of stealing a composition by Wolfgang Amadeus Mozart for the song.

Talking to Billboard, she revealed that the song is mainly "about accepting yourself and embracing imperfections and your flaws", while also saying she wants "people to realize that [they] don’t have to be perfect". In the song, Poarch references fictional character Bob the Builder, and dolls Barbie and Ken. I-D's George Griffiths declared that Poarch "coos over the unrealistic standards men hold women to", while Robin Murray of Clash opined that the song "focusses on female empowerment". During the nursery rhyme chorus, the singer affirms, "This ain't build a bitch / You don't get to pick and choose."

== Reception ==
The song was met with positive reviews from music critics who complimented its sound. Griffiths deemed it "bratty" and "a candy-coated pop track". Pareles declared that "Poarch is making a move into her own music [and] 'Build a Bitch' comes across cute and furious". Haylock called the track "[a] cutesy pop song". Billboard's Jason Lipshutz considered it "an audacious, darkly comic slice of new-school pop". Hattie Collins of Vogue said that the song "demonstrates both her innate musical talent and ambitions as an artist" and noted Poarch is "deftly dismantling the impossible standards of beauty that we are put under". Collins also noted that "Build a Bitch" is "incredibly catchy". The track was used in around a million videos on TikTok within a week following its release.

On the Billboard Hot 100, "Build a Bitch" debuted at number 58 on the week ending May 29, 2021. The song reached its peak position of 56 two weeks later, and attained a platinum certification from the Recording Industry Association of America (RIAA) in the US. "Build a Bitch" reached the top ten in India, Malaysia, and Singapore. It further peaked within the top 30 in Australia, Czech Republic, Finland, Hungary, Ireland, New Zealand, Norway, Slovakia, and on the Billboard Global 200. The track also reached the top 30 in Canada and United Kingdom, where it received a platinum certification from Music Canada (MC) in the former and a silver one in the latter from the British Phonographic Industry. In Poland, the song reached number 60 and was certified platinum by the Polish Society of the Phonographic Industry (ZPAV).

== Music video ==
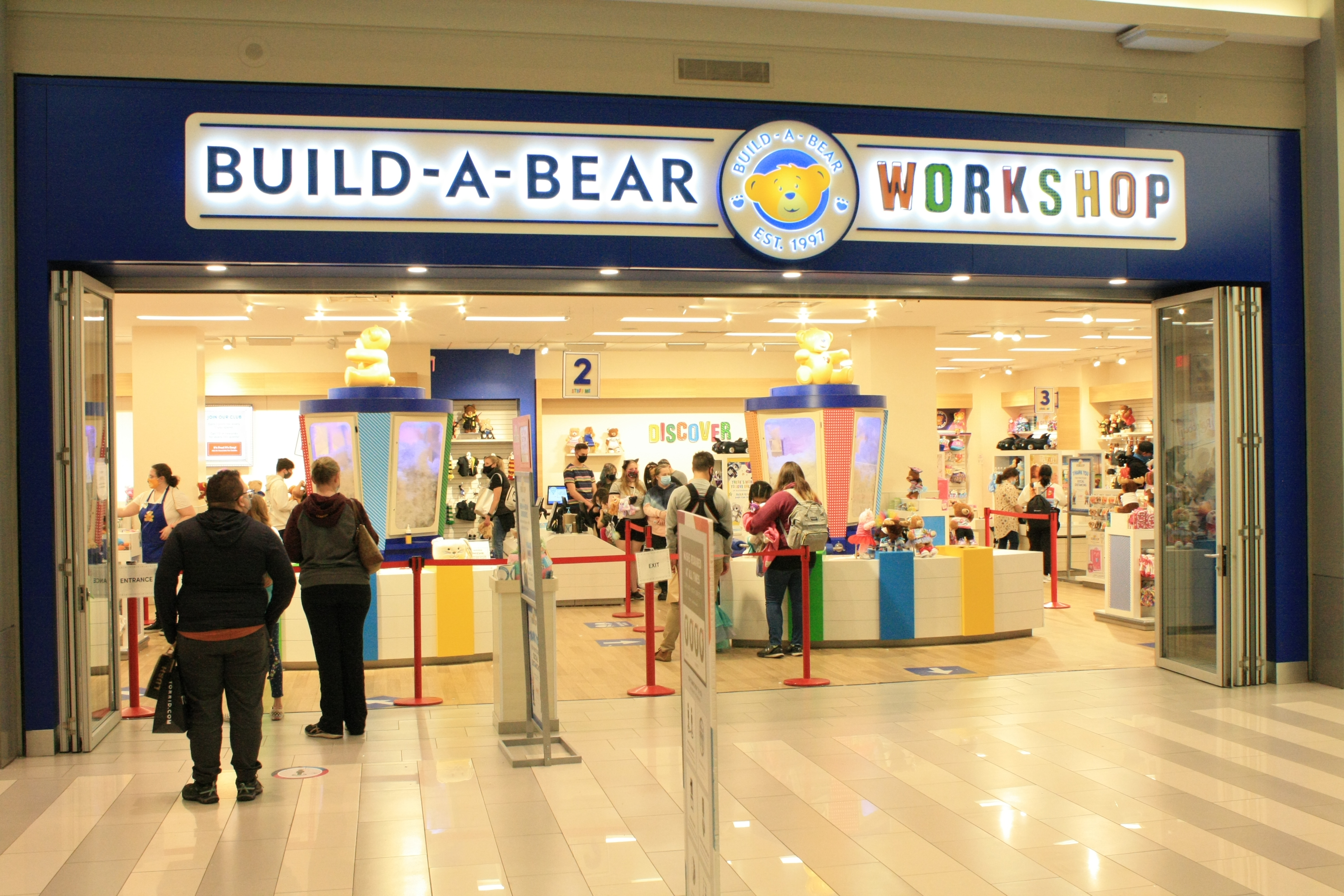
The factory at which men can create their ideal woman in the music video is similar to a Build-A-Bear Workshop (pictured).

Directed by Andrew Donoho, the music video for "Build a Bitch" premiered alongside the single on May 14, 2021. The video depicts a factory where men can create their ideal woman, akin to a Build-A-Bear Workshop. Poarch subsequently begins a revolution and burns the factory down, escaping to freedom. The music video features cameos from several internet celebrities such as Valkyrae, Bretman Rock, Larray, and ZHC. Speaking to Vogue, Poarch admitted that she "really believe[s] the people in the video embody the message of the song and being imperfect, being different, being themselves".

=== Reception ===
Griffiths deemed the video to be "provocative", while Haylock found the song to "juxtapose" with the visual. Griffiths and Pareles compared the video to American dystopian science fiction, neo-Western television series Westworld, with Haylock further comparing Poarch to the series' character, Dolores Abernathy. Within less than a week, it received 70 million views on YouTube. The music video received nominations for Best Visual Effects at the 2021 MTV Video Music Awards, for Best Pop Video – International at the 2021 UK Music Video Awards, and Best Music Video at the 2022 iHeartRadio Music Awards.

== Personnel ==
Credits adapted from AllMusic.

- Bella Poarch – lead vocals, songwriter
- David Arkwright – songwriter, producer
- Justin Gammella – songwriter, producer
- Salem Ilese – songwriter
- Jaycen Joshua – mixing
- Colin Leonard – mastering
- Stefan Max – executive producer
- Elie Rizk – songwriter, producer
- Sub Urban – songwriter, producer

== Charts ==
=== Weekly charts ===
Weekly chart performance for "Build a Bitch"
Chart (2021)	Peak position
Australia (ARIA)	28
Austria (Ö3 Austria Top 40)	60
Belgium (Ultratip Bubbling Under Flanders)	36
Canada (Canadian Hot 100)	28
Czech Republic Airplay (ČNS IFPI)	40
Czech Republic Singles Digital (ČNS IFPI)	29
Finland (Suomen virallinen lista)	19
France (SNEP)	158
Germany (GfK)	86
Global 200 (Billboard)	20
Greece International (IFPI)	39
Hungary (Single Top 40)	16
Hungary (Stream Top 40)	26
India International (IMI)	10
Ireland (IRMA)	23
Japan Hot Overseas (Billboard Japan)	12
Lithuania (AGATA)	31
Malaysia (RIM)	5
Netherlands (Single Top 100)	78
New Zealand (Recorded Music NZ)	24
Norway (VG-lista)	25
Poland Airplay (ZPAV)	60
Portugal (AFP)	60
Romania (Airplay 100)	84
Singapore (RIAS)	6
Slovakia Singles Digital (ČNS IFPI)	24
Sweden (Sverigetopplistan)	65
Switzerland (Schweizer Hitparade)	74
UK Singles (Official Charts)	30
US Billboard Hot 100	56
US Pop Airplay (Billboard)	24

=== Year-end charts ===
Year-end chart performance for "Build a Bitch"
Chart (2021)	Position
Global 200 (Billboard)	174

== Certifications ==
Certifications for "Build a Bitch"
Region	Certification	Certified units/sales
Canada (Music Canada)	Platinum	80,000^{‡}
New Zealand (RMNZ)	Gold	15,000^{‡}
Poland (ZPAV)	Platinum	50,000^{‡}
United Kingdom (BPI)	Silver	200,000^{‡}
United States (RIAA)	Platinum	1,000,000^{‡}
^{‡} Sales+streaming figures based on certification alone.

== Release history ==
Release dates and formats for "Build a Bitch"
Region	Date	Format(s)	Label	Ref.
Various	May 14, 2021	Digital download; streaming	Warner	
Italy	May 24, 2021	Radio airplay	Warner	
United States	June 1, 2021	Contemporary hit radio	Warner	
