= Thrill Seeker (EP) =

EP by Sub Urban
- Released: March 13, 2020
- Recorded: 2017–2019
- Length: 18:59
- Label: Warner
- Producer: Sub Urban

Sub Urban chronology
Thrill Seeker (2020)	Hive (2022)

Singles from Thrill Seeker
- 1. "Isolate" Released: August 29, 2019; 2. "Freak" Released: March 13, 2020

Thrill Seeker is the debut extended play released by American singer Sub Urban on March 13, 2020. The EP is self-produced and contains 7 songs, with a sole collaboration with Rei Ami, and features the singles "Isolate" and "Freak".

== Background ==
Thrill Seeker was released through Warner Records on March 13, 2020. In an interview with Ones To Watch, Sub Urban stated:

"Thrill Seeker tells a story of adolescent imperfection from the perfectionist. I wrote and produced the collection of songs from the ages of 16 to 18. Every song takes me to a different headspace cultivated by my youth: turmoil and sheer angst contrasted by theatrical self-awareness and worldly dissociation".

== Track listing ==
Thrill Seeker track listing
No.	Title	Writer(s)	Producer(s)	Length
1.	"Freak" (featuring Rei Ami)	Daniel Maisonneuve; Sarah Lee	Sub Urban	3:14
2.	"Cliche"	Maisonneuve; David Basset	Urban	2:56
3.	"KMS"	Maisonneuve	Urban	2:40
4.	"Spring Fever"	Maisonneuve	Urban	2:48
5.	"Isolate"	Maisonneuve	Urban	2:22
6.	"Cirque"	Maisonneuve	Urban	3:04
7.	"when the flies fell"	Maisonneuve	Urban	1:55
Total length:				18:59
