= Freak (Sub Urban song) =

Single by Sub Urban featuring Rei Ami

from the EP Thrill Seeker
- Released: March 13, 2020
- Recorded: 2019
- Genre: Alt-rock; pop
- Length: 3:14
- Label: Warner
- Songwriters: Sarah Yeeun Lee; Daniel Virgil Maisonneuve
- Producer: Sub Urban

Sub Urban singles chronology
| "Isolate" (2019) | "Freak" (2020) | "Patchwerk" (2021) |

Rei Ami singles chronology
| "Runaway" (2020) | "Freak" (2020) | "Mac & Cheese" (2020) |

Music video
- "Freak" on YouTube

"Freak" is a song by the American singer-songwriter and record producer Sub Urban featuring the South Korean rapper Rei Ami. It was released on March 13, 2020, through Warner Records as the second single from the former's extended play (EP) Thrill Seeker (2020). It was written by Maisonneuve and Lee, with the former handling the production. The song would later rise to prominence following its newfound popularity on social-media platform TikTok. "Freak" was a commercial success, and peaked at number 28 on both the Billboard Alternative Airplay and Hot Rock & Alternative Songs charts.

== Background and release ==
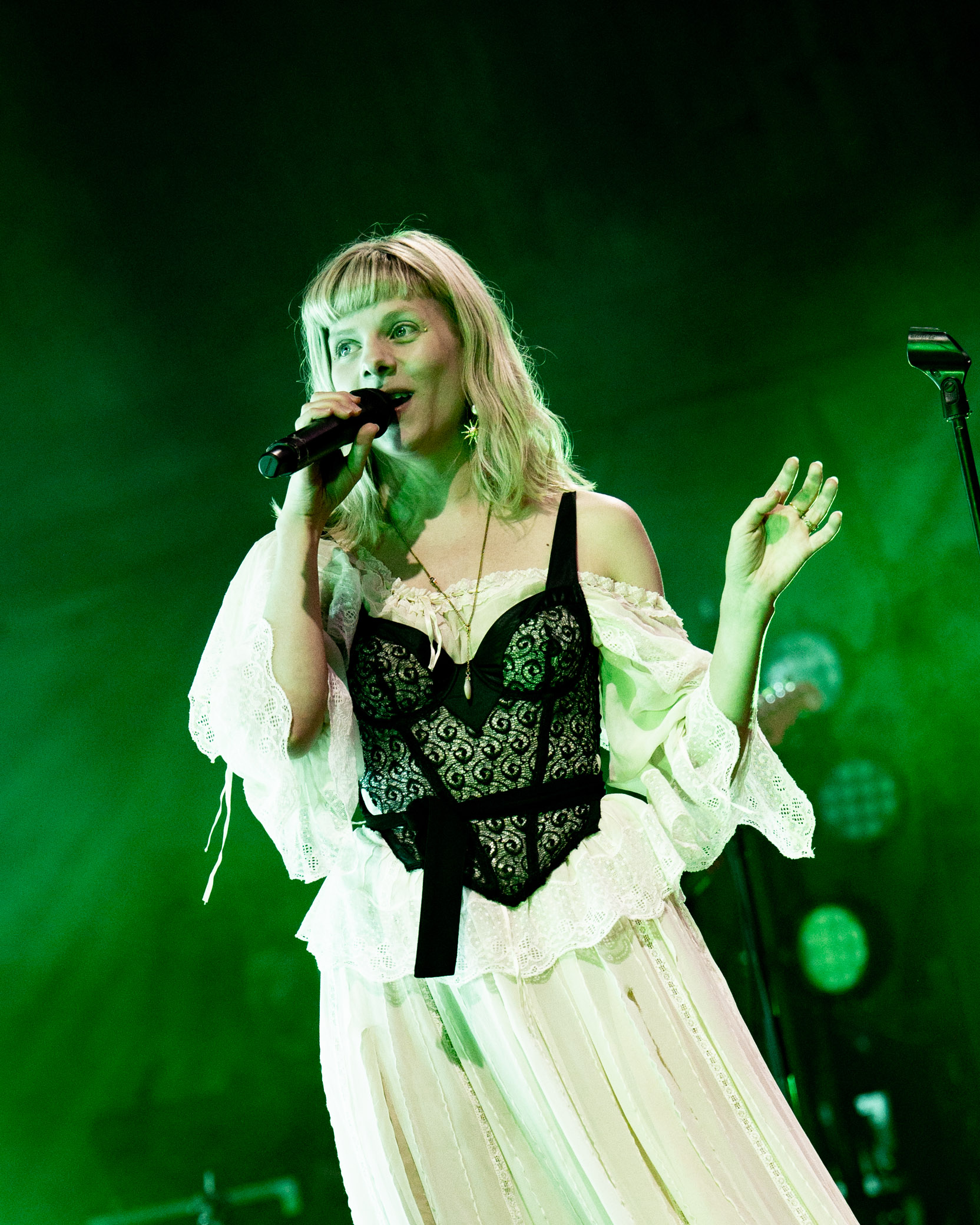
Sub Urban had performed the song alongside Aurora at the Warfield Theatre in San Francisco.

Following the surge of popularity of his 2019 single "Cradles", Maisonneuve began working on material for his debut extended play (EP) Thrill Seeker (2020). He later released "Freak" through Warner Records as the second and final single for the EP on March 13, 2020. In an interview with Rhian Daly at NME, Sub Urban had stated that: "[I] definitely do want to move away from it finally because my EP just dropped and ["Freak"]'s going strong." Warner ran a TikTok campaign with the digital marketing company, Songfluencer. In an interview, co-founder Johnny Cloherty stated: “One choreography was actually the top trending post for the song, but another choreography was experiencing much more user-generated-content.” He would also discuss the increasing popularity of the song: “In mid-August, the dominoes started to fall, a number of TikTok’s biggest names used “Freak” in videos, and the track is currently on its way to becoming Sub Urban’s second hit, with more than 3.5 million TikTok videos." Sub Urban had performed the song at the Warfield Theatre in San Francisco as part of Aurora’s national eponymous tour.

== Composition ==
Maisonneuve and Lee had written "Freak", with the production being handled by the former. "Freak" is 3 minutes and 14 seconds long; It is a rock song that draws from a variety of genres, including alt-rock and pop. Elias Leight writing for Rolling Stone described it as a "haunted-house pop cut".

== Reception ==
Marissa Matozzo of Paper felt that the track incorporated the "spine-chilling melodies and experimental vocalizations" that Sub Urban was "becoming recognized for". While Ones to Watch's Maxamillion Polo felt that the artists delivered "a siren-like call to their twisted freak show". Commercially, "Freak" entered at number 28 on the Billboard Hot Rock & Alternative Songs, and had also peaked at the same position on the Billboard Alternative Airplay chart.

== Music video ==
Sub Urban (left) and Rei Ami (right) as depicted in the music video.

Andrew Donoho directed the music video for "Freak", which premiered on the same day as the song's release. It has a circus-themed background. Rei Ami is depicted as a snake-human hybrid, while Sub Urban is the ringleader, the one who controls the circus. By March 2021, the video had over 292 million views on YouTube and had also been used in over 3.5 million videos on TikTok. In an interview Sub Urban revealed that he wanted to create a "companion piece" to his hit single "Cradles," while drawing on imagery from a different era. He explained that it was about temptation, a continuous battle over control and the inevitability of sexual nature ironically being painted as sin". Paper's Marissa Matozzo had commended the use of a circus backdrop, saying that it had "historically been a haven for those ostracized by society".

== Credits and personnel ==
Credits from music platforms.

- Sub Urban – vocals, songwriting, mixing, production, mastering
- Rei Ami – vocals, songwriting
- Bijou – additional vocals

== Charts ==
=== Weekly charts ===
Weekly chart performance for "Freak"
| Chart (2020) | Peak position |
|---|---|
| US Alternative Airplay (Billboard) | 28 |
| US Hot Rock & Alternative Songs (Billboard) | 28 |
