= War Rock =

2006 video game

- Developer(s): Dream Execution
- Publisher(s): Nexon Europe; UtoPlanet; Leadhope Digital Inc; Dream Execution; GameNix; GamersFirst; PapayaPlay
- Composer(s): Mr.Larkowis
- Engine: Jindo
- Platform(s): Windows
- Release: KOR: 2004; NA: July 14, 2006
- Genre(s): First-person shooter
- Mode(s): Multiplayer

War Rock (Korean: 워록) is a multiplayer first-person shooter made by the South Korean company, Dream Execution. The game is distributed as a free-to-play, a common form of freeware EULA and available through online downloading. Outside of the Far East, the game is hosted by PapayaPlay, who services the game for both Europe and North America.

Though the game can be downloaded free of charge, War Rock requires online registration.

== Gameplay ==
WarRock is developed in Episodes; similar to TV programming but inverted (four seasons make up one episode). Currently WarRock is on Episode IV, Season 2 - suggesting that WarRock is in its 10th incarnation.

The game is set in the midst of a nuclear war in the fictional Republic of Derbaran. Players select between the two teams and engage in battles using 20th and 21st century military equipment, including a large assortment of infantry weapons and vehicles. Derbaran is the government army (yellow camouflage) and NIU is the rebel army (green camouflage). During most combat modes, players are divided into these two teams and compete as an army against each other.

War Rock games are divided into six main modes of play: Conquest Mode, Capture the Base, Individual Death Match - One Man Army, Bombing Mission, Team Death Match and AI mode.

- Conquest Mode is a game mode where two teams fight to capture neutral bases as well as an enemy base. When the game starts, kill points of both teams will start to decrease. However, when a team has more bases captured than the other team, the rate of decrease in kill points will be slower than the other team. On the other hand, if a team has fewer bases, then the kill points decrease at a faster rate than the enemy team.
- Capture the Base match begins with a neutral base in the middle. Both Derbaran and NIU teams respawn from their bases, and when any of the teams first capture the neutral base, the team occupying more bases changes to a defending team and the other team becomes a challenger. The defending team can win the match when they have successfully defended their bases for a certain period of time. Therefore, the challenging team must take over the base within the given time period.
- Individual Death Match - One Man Army-Everyone fights each other until a person gets a certain number of kills and wins. Depending on the number of players in the room, small or medium size map can be selected.
- Bombing Mission-The goal of this match is to bomb a selected area. Derbarans must install the bomb successfully, and NIU team must prevent the Derbarans from exploding the bomb in the designated area. Players can install/defuse the bomb by pressing the ‘F’ key. Both teams’ fate will be decided within the 3 minutes and 30 seconds of mission time.
- In a Team Death Match, a team, which gets a certain number of kills wins the game. Players can respawn and enter the battlefield again when they die. Up to 32 players can connect to a War Rock game simultaneously, and players will be able to experience more excitement and intensity than any other FPS games.
- In AI Mode, users fight against Bots with AI. As a player kills more bots, higher points and rank can be obtained. Kill as many bots as you can and aim for the highest points and rank!

The game features deathmatch-based multiplayer modes, all of which feature objectives that must be completed in order for teams to win. Sessions end either when a team has reached a preset number of points, or the allotted time expires in which case the team with the most points wins. Not all the game modes are kill based.

The player's performance is tracked with experience points and in-game money which players can earn several ways including defeating opponents, or completing objectives. As players gain experience, they will advance in level, allowing access to new weapons and items, which can be bought with money earned in the game. War Rock features a clan system, that allows members to engage in clan wars whilst representing their specific clans.

== Reception ==
Reception

Aggregate scores
| Aggregator | Score |
|---|---|
| GameRankings | 57.14% |
| Metacritic | 53/100 |

Review score
| Publication | Score |
|---|---|
| IGN | 5.9/10 |

IGN rated it a "mediocre" 5.9 and GameSpot rated the game 5.5 out of 10.
