= Styles of pop music =

Pop music is a genre of popular music that originated in its modern form during the mid-1950s in the United States and the United Kingdom. The terms popular music and pop music are often used interchangeably, although the former describes all music that is popular and includes many disparate styles. During the 1950s and 1960s, pop music encompassed rock and roll and the youth-oriented styles it influenced. Rock and pop music remained roughly synonymous until the late 1960s, after which pop became associated with music that was more commercial, ephemeral, and accessible.

Although much of the music that appears on record charts is seen as pop music, the genre is distinguished from chart music. Identifying factors usually include repeated choruses and hooks, short to medium-length songs written in a basic format (often the verse–chorus structure), and rhythms or tempos that can be easily danced to. Much pop music also borrows elements from other styles such as rock, urban, dance, Latin, and country.

Below is a list of styles of pop music.

== Stylistic origins ==
=== Traditional pop ===
Traditional pop (also known as classic pop and pre–rock and roll pop) is Western popular music that generally predates the advent of rock and roll in the mid-1950s. The most popular and enduring songs from this era of music are known as pop standards or American standards. The works of these songwriters and composers are usually considered part of the canon known as the "Great American Songbook". More generally, the term "standard" can be applied to any popular song that has become very widely known within mainstream culture.

AllMusic defines traditional pop as "post–big band and pre–rock & roll pop music".

=== Rock and roll ===
Rock and roll (often written as rock & roll, rock 'n' roll, or rock 'n roll) is a genre of popular music that evolved in the United States during the late 1940s and early 1950s. It originated from black American music such as gospel, jump blues, jazz, boogie woogie, rhythm and blues, as well as country music. While rock and roll's formative elements can be heard in blues records from the 1920s and in country records of the 1930s, the genre did not acquire its name until 1954.

== Earliest form ==
Early pop music drew on the sentimental ballad for its form, gained its use of vocal harmonies from gospel and soul music, instrumentation from jazz and rock music, orchestration from classical music, tempo from dance music, backing from electronic music, rhythmic elements from hip-hop music, and spoken passages from rap.

== Subgenres ==
Below are genres that exclusively considered as subgenres of pop.

Note that music styles like dance, electronic, opera, and orchestra are not considered as standalone genres.

=== Dark pop ===
Dark pop
- Stylistic origins: Alternative; pop; electronic; indie; grunge
- Cultural origins: 1980s and 1990s

Dark pop (often typeset with a hyphen) is a subgenre of pop music that combines elements of alternative and indie with pop music. It is characterized by its deep melancholic sound and minimalistic electronic production. Often dark pop features heavy synths, distorted guitars, and electronic drums.

The trend began in the 1980s with grunge, a genre that also dealt with depressing topics about heartbreak, loss and loneliness, similar to topics expressed in dark pop. By the 1990s, dark pop drew from trip-hop, gothic rock, and avant-garde traditions, evolving and disengaging into a distinct style that emphasized atmospheric texture and introspective storytelling. However dark pop isn't avant-garde, often having a more mainstream sound. Many artists also started to incorporate dark pop with punk, rap and electronic sounds. During the 2010s, these infusions became prominent as it gained mainstream traction by well known artists such as Rina Sawayama who infused it with electronic club music. A notable dark pop song, that also incorporated electronic sounds is singer and social media personality Bella Poarch's debut single "Build a Bitch".

== Fusion genres ==
Below are styles of pop music blended with other standalone genres.

=== Disco-pop ===
Disco-pop
- Stylistic origins: Disco; pop
- Cultural origins: Late 1970s

Rolling Stone and The New York Times have used the term disco-pop as early as 1976 and 1978 respectively. The publications referring to songs such as "Don't Go Breaking My Heart" by Elton John and Kiki Dee and "Heart of Gold" by Boney M. while stating the music of the Salsoul Orchestra was "material and arrangements are unalloyed disco pop." Retrospectively, albums such as Michael Jackson's Off the Wall have been referred to as the genre. With the release of Saturday Night Fever's film and album leading disco music to explode in popularity in 1978. This led to thousands of discotheque moguls and their patrons to mimic what contorted versions of dance culture. Tim Lawrence wrote on this phenomnen as interesting, but that "while the initial experience was thrilling, the effect soon began to fade or, worse still, jar. By 1979 the combination of the shrill white disco pop that had come to dominate the charts".

Around the 2000s, some new songs were described as disco-pop, including "Sing It Back" by Moloko, "Murder on the Dancefloor" by Sophie Ellis-Bextor.

Allure stated in 2020 that there was a disco-pop revival in music, such as Dua Lipa's Future Nostalgia and Lady Gaga's Chromatica. Other artists who contributed to the revival included Doja Cat, Victoria Monet, and Jessie Ware.

=== House-pop ===
House-pop
- Stylistic origins: House; disco; diva house; synth-pop
- Cultural origins: 1990s, United States

House-pop (sometimes also called "pop-house") is a crossover of house and dance-pop music that emerged in early '90s. The genre was created to make house music more radio friendly. The characteristic of house-pop is similar to diva house music, like over-the-top vocal acrobatics, bubbly synth riffs, and four-on-the-floor rhythm. House-pop also has hip-hop influence.

== Avant-garde related genres ==
Below are subgenres of pop music that draw influence from avant-garde artistic traditions.

== Regional scenes and subgenres ==
- American pop
- Arabic pop music
- Assyrian folk/pop music
- Austropop
- Azerbaijani pop music
- Brazilian pop music
- British pop music
- Cantopop
- Europop
- French Mandopop
- French pop music
- Hokkien pop
- Hong Kong English pop
- Hungarian pop
- Indian pop
- Indo pop
- Iranian pop music
- Lao pop
- Latin pop
- Mandopop
- Mexican pop music
- Moroccan pop
- Nederpop
- Pinoy pop
- Pop music in Ukraine
- Q-pop
- Russian pop
- Serbian pop
- Sundanese pop
- Thai pop music
- Turkish pop music
- V-pop

=== Popular music scenes ===
- African popular music
- American popular music
- British popular music
  - Early British popular music
  - popular music of Birmingham
  - popular music of Manchester
- C-pop
- French popular music
- Italian popular music
- J-pop
- K-pop
- Malaysian popular music
- Música popular brasileira
- Nordic popular music
- Original Pilipino music
- Pakistani popular music
- popular music in Croatia
- popular music in Sweden
- popular music in Yugoslavia
- popular music of Vietnam
- Slovak popular music
