= Bella Poarch =

Filipino and American social media personality (born 1997)

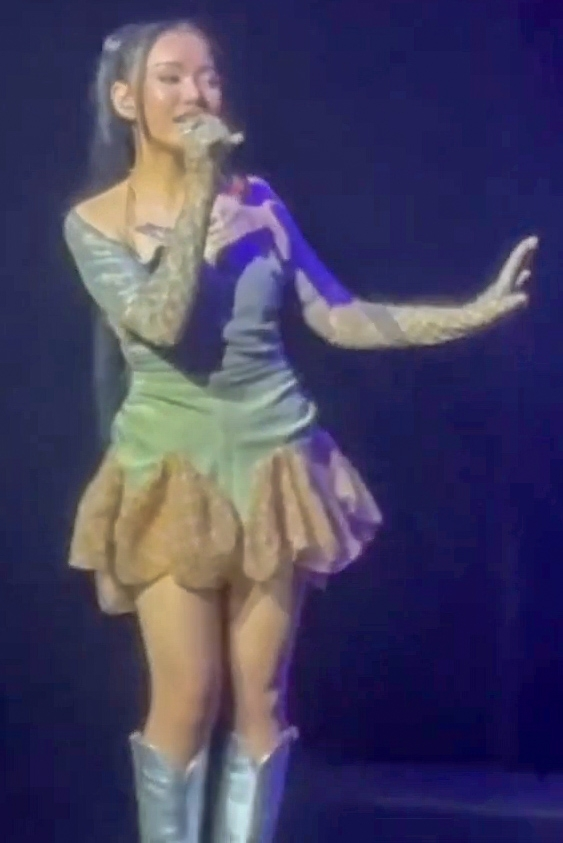
- Poarch performing at the Pink Aura Tour in 2024
- Born: Belinda Marie Macadengdeng Batumbakal; February 9, 1997 (age 29); San Fabian, Pangasinan, Philippines
- Other name: Denarie Bautista Taylor (Note: This is Poarch's legal name. As she was adopted, this is different from her birth name)
- Citizenship: United States (naturalized); Philippines (by birth)
- Occupations: Social media personality; singer
- Years active: 2020–present
- Spouse: Tyler Poarch (m. 2019; div. 2023)
- Musical career
- Genres: Pop; electropop; alternative pop; dark pop
- Instrument: Vocals
- Labels: Warner; Last Gang

Denarie Bautista Taylor (born Belinda Marie Macadengdeng Batumbakal; February 9, 1997), known professionally as Bella Poarch (/pɔːrtʃ/ PORCH), is a Filipino and American social media personality, singer, and U.S. Navy veteran. She rose to fame after creating the most liked video on TikTok in August 2020, (Note: Although some sources have said the video was posted on August 18, 2020, such as Dexerto, (see WP:DEXERTO), others such as reliable sources, Business Insider and Stereogum, have said August 17, 2020.) in which she lip syncs to Millie B's song "M to the B". She is the fifth most-followed individual on the platform and the most followed person from the Philippines.

In May 2021, Poarch signed a music recording contract with Warner Records. Her debut single "Build a Bitch" was released that same year, which peaked at 56 on the Billboard Hot 100. Her debut extended play (EP) Dolls was released in August 2022. She was also included on Forbes 30 Under 30 in 2022.

== Early life and military career ==
Poarch was born Belinda Marie Macadengdeng Batumbakal on February 9, 1997, in the Philippines. She was raised by her grandmother in slums until the age of three and was then adopted.

At age 13, Poarch and her family (with exception of her sisters who still reside in the Philippines) moved to San Francisco to reside with her aunt for several months, before moving to Texas for her father's bypass surgery. Poarch is a United States Navy veteran, enlisting in the Navy at 17, and becoming an aviation ordnanceman in 2017. She served for three years, having been stationed in Japan and Hawaii.

== Career ==
=== 2020–2021: Rise to fame with TikTok ===
In January 2020, Poarch created her TikTok account. She started actively posting gaming and cosplay content on TikTok in April 2020. She gained notability in August 2020, when her lip sync videos went viral, most notably a video where she is lip-syncing to "M to the B" by Millie B. The zoomed-in video of her lip-syncing and rhythmically bouncing her head to the song went viral and became TikTok's most liked video of all time. Following her TikTok success, she launched a YouTube channel and Twitter page.

Poarch is also associated with her alpaca stuffed toy. In 2020, she released a limited clothing line RIPNDIP x Paca Collaboration.

In December 2020, Poarch's popularity peaked when she reportedly grabbed the interest of two large professional Esports organizations, 100 Thieves and FaZe Clan, which apparently showed interest in her, a live streamer and gamer, as a content creator under their respective banners.

In May 2021, Poarch signed a record deal with Warner Records. On May 14, Poarch released her debut single "Build a Bitch." She stated that the song was inspired by her experiences with being bullied as a child, disclosing "Growing up, I used to get bullied and stuff ... I wanted my first song to have a good meaning to it and to help a lot of people just to be like, more confident about themselves." The associated music video was described by Billboard as "an audacious, darkly comic slice of new-school pop," created with Daniel Virgil Maisonneuve, the producer-songwriter better known as Sub Urban. The video features other notable internet personalities including Valkyrae, Mia Khalifa, Bretman Rock and ZHC.

On an episode of the 100 Thieves podcast The CouRage and Nadeshot Show, Poarch stated that she has wanted to become a singer since she was a child.

=== 2022: Dolls ===
Poarch released her first EP, Dolls, on August 12, 2022. It includes her previous singles – "Build a Bitch," "Inferno," and "Dolls" – as well as new tracks "Villain," "No Man's Land," and "Living Hell." A music video for "Living Hell" debuted alongside the EP. In addition to co-starring in the music video for "Dolls," Grimes features on "No Man's Land." Rolling Stone praised the dark pop tone of the EP. "Villain" would be used for WWE's Extreme Rules premium live event in 2022.

Poarch released a song and music video with Lauv on September 15, 2023, titled "Crush," followed by "Bad Boy" on November 10. A remix of the latter with the Mexican YouTuber and singer Kenia OS was released on December 10. In 2024 she released a collaboration with the American singer 6arelyhuman, "Don't Like Anybody." Poarch featured on the song "F*CK OFF" for Kenia OS's album Pink Aura.

=== 2024–2026: Split with Warner and first album Picnic at the Cemetery ===
On October 18, 2024, Poarch released "Sweet Delusion," her first solo song since "Bad Boy." She announced on Instagram that "Sweet Delusion" and "Will You Always Love Her," released on March 21, 2025, were intended to be on her first album. On May 1, 2026, she released "Ribcage" and announced her first album, Picnic at the Cemetery. She revealed through the credit of the song that she was not under Warner Records anymore, and with the countdown on Spotify that "Sweet Delusion" and "Will You Always Love Her" were not included on the album.

On her website, Poarch describe the album as a cinematic coming-of-age album about reclaiming memory, rewriting pain, and finding solace in yourself after trauma. She's also introducing a character made by herself, "The Bighead." The purpose of the character is to guide her through heartbreak, girlhood, and self-repair as the album goes by.

On June 26, 2026, she released the album's second single, "My Boy," accompanied by its music video. She also introduced new hand-drawn characters named "Boy 1," "Boy 2," and "Boy 3;" she explained that while writing "My Boy," she had envisioned three rabbits forming her band, each playing a specific instrument: Boy 1 on guitar, Boy 2 on keyboard, and Boy 3 on drums.

On August 14, she released the album's third single "Stay Gone", accompanied by its music video. Like the other single, she introduced a new hand-drawn character "Wick". Poarch reveales that he was created way before the song.

Poarch is now signed under her own label, "M TO THE BEE", a reference to her 2020 viral video, and under exclusive license of the Canadian record label Last Gang Records, which is itself under the American independent label MNRK Music Group.

== Personal life ==
Poarch resides in Los Angeles. She is a cosplayer.

She has expressed her support on social media for the Asian-American community following the rise in reports of anti-Asian hate crimes in the context of COVID-19 pandemic. She also shared her experiences with Vogue, saying that she has been "treated differently" and "randomly attacked and assaulted" as an Asian teenager after moving to the United States from the Philippines.

In September 2020, Korean social media users criticized Poarch for having a tattoo similar to the Rising Sun Flag in her videos. The specific tattoo resembled a symbol of Japanese imperialism, which is considered offensive to East Asians. She apologized and had it covered, then later removed.

She married Tyler Poarch in 2019. She filed for divorce from him in November 2022. The divorce was finalized in October 2023.

In August 2021, she shared that she was a victim of sexual assault.

== Discography ==
=== Albums ===
Title	Release details
Picnic at the Cemetery	Released: September 18, 2026; Label: Last Gang; Format: CD, CS, LP, DL, streaming

=== Extended plays ===
Title	Details	Peak chart positions	
Title	Details	US Heat.	UK Down.
Dolls	Released: August 12, 2022; Label: Warner; Formats: CD, LP, DL, streaming	8	47

=== Singles ===
List of singles, with year released, selected chart positions, certifications, and album name shown
Title	Year	Peak chart positions										Certifications	Album
Title	Year	US	AUS	CAN	GER	IRE	NOR	NLD	NZ	SWE	UK	Certifications	Album
"Build a Bitch"	2021	56	28	28	86	23	25	78	24	65	30	RIAA: Platinum; BPI: Silver; MC: Platinum; RMNZ: Gold	Dolls
"Inferno" (with Sub Urban)	2021	— (Note: "Inferno" did not enter the Billboard Hot 100, but peaked at number four on the Bubbling Under Hot 100 Chart.)	—	61	—	—	—	—	— (Note: "Inferno" did not enter the NZ Top 40 Singles Chart, but peaked at number 13 on the NZ Hot Singles Chart.)	—	—	RIAA: Gold	Hive and Dolls
"Dolls"	2022	—	—	—	—	—	—	—	—	—	— (Note: "Dolls" did not enter the UK Singles Chart, but peaked at number 59 on the UK Video Streaming Chart.)		Dolls
"Living Hell"	2022	—	—	—	—	—	—	—	—	—	—		Dolls
"Crush" (with Lauv)	2023	—	—	—	—	—	—	—	— (Note: "Crush" did not enter the NZ Top 40 Singles Chart, but peaked at number 35 on the NZ Hot Singles Chart.)	—	—		Non-album singles
"Bad Boy" (solo or remix featuring Kenia Os)	2023	—	—	—	—	—	—	—	—	—	—		Non-album singles
"Don't Like Anybody" (with 6arelyhuman)	2024	—	—	—	—	—	—	—	—	—	—		Non-album singles
"F* Off" (with Kenia Os)	2024	—	—	—	—	—	—	—	—	—	—		Pink Aura
"Sweet Delusion"	2024	—	—	—	—	—	—	—	—	—	—		Non-album singles
"Will You Always Love Her?"	2025	—	—	—	—	—	—	—	—	—	—		Non-album singles
"Zombie"	2025	—	—	—	—	—	—	—	—	—	—		Wednesday: Season 2 (soundtrack)
"Ribcage"	2026	—	—	—	—	—	—	—	—	—	—		Picnic at the Cemetery
"My Boy"	2026	—	—	—	—	—	—	—	—	—	—		Picnic at the Cemetery
"Stay Gone"	2026	—	—	—	—	—	—	—	—	—	—		Picnic at the Cemetery
"—" denotes a recording that failed to chart, was ineligible for the chart, or was not released.

== Tours ==
- Picnic At The Cemetery Tour (2027)

== Awards and nominations ==
Year	Award	Recipient(s) and nominee(s)	Category	Result	Ref.
2021	MTV Millennial Awards	Herself	Global Creator	Nominated	
2021	MTV Video Music Awards	"Build a Bitch"	Best Visual Effects	Nominated	
2021	People's Choice Awards	Herself	New Artist	Nominated	
2021	UK Music Video Awards	"Build a Bitch"	Best Pop Video – International	Nominated	
2021	Streamy Awards	Herself	Creator of the Year	Nominated	
2021	Streamy Awards	Herself	Breakout Creator of the Year	Won	
2021	Streamy Awards	Herself	Short Form	Nominated	
2022	iHeartRadio Music Awards	Herself	Social Star Award	Won	
2022	iHeartRadio Music Awards	"Build a Bitch"	Best Music Video	Nominated	
2022	Forbes 30 Under 30	Herself	Social Media	Included	
2023	Nickelodeon Kids Choice Awards	Herself	Favorite Social Music Star	Won	
2023	Berlin Music Video Awards	Dolls	Best Concept	Nominated	
2024	Nickelodeon Kids Choice Awards	Herself	Favorite Social Music Star	Won	
