= Cradles (song) =

Single by Sub Urban
- Released: January 4, 2019
- Recorded: 2018
- Genre: Indie rock; future bass; electropop; EDM; indie pop
- Length: 3:29
- Label: NCS
- Songwriter: Daniel Maisonneuve
- Producers: Sub Urban; Luke Arreguin

Sub Urban singles chronology
"Sick of You" (2019)	"Cradles" (2019)	"Isolate" (2019)

Alternative cover

Audio sample
- "Cradles": file; help

Music video
- "Cradles" on YouTube

"Cradles" is a song by American singer Sub Urban, released on January 4, 2019, through NoCopyrightSounds.

== Background ==
In January 2019, Sub Urban released his debut song "Cradles" on NoCopyrightSounds. The song went viral on TikTok, resulting in the original audio to receive over 100 million views on YouTube and pushing Sub Urban to sign a deal with Warner Records after topping Billboard's Alternative charts. The song's success additionally personally affected Sub Urban, resulting in his family's acceptance of him for previously dropping out of high school to pursue music.

== Music video ==
The music video was directed by Andrew Donoho and released on October 9, 2019. Throughout the video, Sub Urban is seen in a bedroom lit on fire, solid color rooms with numerous masked corpses, curtained rooms with dancing mannequins, and a narrow metal bridge.

== Other uses ==
The song is part of the soundtrack of the 2023 rhythm video game Just Dance 2024 Edition. In 2024, NoCopyrightSounds had a collaboration with Geometry Dash in which the song was featured in the game's music library.

== Charts ==
=== Weekly charts ===
Weekly chart performance for "Cradles"
Chart (2020)	Peak position
Canada Rock (Billboard)	32
Mexico Ingles Airplay (Billboard)	28
US Alternative Airplay (Billboard)	1
US Rock & Alternative Airplay (Billboard)	8

=== Year-end charts ===
Year-end chart performance for "Cradles"
Chart (2020)	Position
US Rock & Alternative Airplay (Billboard)	26

== Certifications ==
Certifications for "Cradles"
Region	Certification	Certified units/sales
Canada (Music Canada)	Platinum	80,000^{‡}
Italy (FIMI)	Gold	50,000^{‡}
New Zealand (RMNZ)	Platinum	30,000^{‡}
Spain (Promusicae)	Gold	30,000^{‡}
United Kingdom (BPI)	Gold	400,000^{‡}
United States (RIAA)	Platinum	1,000,000^{‡}
^{‡} Sales+streaming figures based on certification alone.
