= Sub Urban (musician) =

American singer-songwriter (born 1999)

- Born: Daniel Virgil Maisonneuve; October 22, 1999 (age 27); Nyack, New York, U.S.
- Genres: Pop; indie pop; electro; alternative; alt pop; trap metal; punk rock
- Occupations: singer; songwriter; producer
- Instruments: Vocals; piano
- Works: Discography
- Years active: 2014–present
- Labels: AWAL; Warner; NCS
- Website: thatsuburban.com

Daniel Virgil Maisonneuve (born October 22, 1999), known professionally as Sub Urban, is an American singer-songwriter and producer. Born in Nyack, New York and raised in Ridgewood, New Jersey, he started producing and writing songs at fifteen. He initially rose to prominence with his hit single "Cradles", which gained virality on TikTok.

== Early life and career ==
Daniel Virgil Maisonneuve was born on October 22, 1999, in Nyack, New York. His father is of French Canadian descent, while his mother is of Taiwanese descent. Maisonneuve was raised in the suburbs of Ridgewood, New Jersey, and begun producing music at the age of 15. He was trained in classical piano at the age of 6, but quit because he was "sick of playing other people's compositions." In the fall of 2016, Maisonneuve dropped out of high school, citing manic depression. Afterwards, he started "isolating" himself to work on various demos and songs. "Cradles" skyrocketed in popularity after being shared heavily on video-sharing application TikTok. "Freak", the lead single from his Thrill Seeker EP, peaked at number No. 28 on the Billboard Alternative Airplay and the Hot Rock & Alternative Songs charts. The song also went viral on TikTok and garnered over 150 million streams.

== Discography ==
Studio albums

- Hive (2022)
- If Nevermore (2025)

== Musical style ==
Maisonneuve is known for his androgynous-chiming vocals in his music, and describes his sound as "mid-century pop blended with Latin classical guitar and electronic beats."

Maisonneuve's sound ranges from Latin, to post-punk revival, electronic dance music (EDM) and many more combinations of genres. He also used to incorporate heavy bass drops with music box bells, or other mallet sounds (see "Cradles", "Build a Bitch", "Rabbit Hole", "Diamond"). Producer Elie Rizk usually works with Maisonneuve on the production of multiple songs, and his influence can be heard in certain tracks from the albums Hive and If Nevermore.

== Tours ==
=== Headlining ===
- 2021: Virgils Mania Tour (with Bella Poarch) [cancelled due to unforeseen circumstances]
- 2022: Sub Urban Winter Tour
- 2025: Anhedonia Tour
- 2026: The Bell Tolls Tour

=== Supporting ===
- 2020: Melanie Martinez — K-12 Tour (cancelled due to COVID-19 pandemic)
- 2022: Aurora — The Gods We Can Touch Tour
- 2026: Two Feet — The Next Steps Tour

== Awards and nominations ==
=== Berlin Music Video Awards ===
The Berlin Music Video Awards is an international festival that promotes the art of music videos.

Year	Nominated work	Award	Result	Ref.
2026	"What You Sow"	Best Director	Nominated	
