= Dirty Computer (film) =

- Directed by: Andrew Donoho; Lacey Duke; Alan Ferguson; Chuck Lightning; Emma Westenberg
- Written by: Chuck Lightning
- Story by: Alan Ferguson; Chuck Lightning; Janelle Monáe; Nate “Rocket” Wonder
- Starring: Janelle Monáe; Tessa Thompson; Jayson Aaron
- Cinematography: Todd Banhazl
- Edited by: Taylor Brusky; Andrew Donoho; Deji Laray
- Music by: Wynne Bennett; Nate "Rocket" Wonder
- Production company: Wondaland
- Distributed by: Wondaland; Bad Boy Records; Atlantic Records
- Release date: April 27, 2018
- Running time: 49 minutes
- Country: United States
- Language: English

Dirty Computer is a 2018 dystopian musical science fiction film. It serves as a visual companion to Dirty Computer, the third studio album by Janelle Monáe. Billed as an "emotion picture", Dirty Computer tells the story of android Jane 57821 and her struggles as she "attempts to break free from the constraints of a totalitarian society that forcibly makes [her] comply with its homophobic beliefs". The film was produced by Wondaland, Monáe's multimedia production company, and was directed by Andrew Donoho and Chuck Lightning, with the music video portions of the film directed by Donoho ("Django Jane"), Lacey Duke ("I Like That"), Alan Ferguson ("Crazy, Classic, Life", "Make Me Feel"), and Emma Westenberg ("Pynk", "Screwed").

== Cast ==
- Janelle Monáe as Jane 57821
- Tessa Thompson as MaryApple53 / Zen
- Jayson Aaron as Ché
- Michele Hart as Virgin Victoria
- Dyson Posey as Cleaner #1
- Jonah Lees as Cleaner #2
- Angel Blaise as Computer
- Lori Dorfman as David Bowie
- Alexis Long as BMX rider
- Miesha Moore as Black Girl Magic Dancer
- Oliver Morton as Scream Police
- Jannica Olin as Dirty Computer
- Marlo Su as Dirty
- Alex Wexo as Scream Police
- Andi Yuma as Punk

== Analysis ==
Dirty Computer was described as a film that explores "humanity and what truly happens to life, liberty and the pursuit of happiness when mind and machines merge, and when the government chooses fear over freedom" in a press release announcing the release of the director's cut. The film explores several hallmarks of identity and expression, including gender, personhood, race and sexuality, as well as several motifs commonly found in science fiction films such as androids, dystopian government, and memory erasure.

== Release ==
Dirty Computer had a cross-channel premiere on MTV, BET, and their sister channels on April 26, 2018, one day before the release of its companion album. The film was then made available on YouTube at midnight EST to coincide with the release of the album. YouTube also held a special screening on April 27 at their YouTube Space facility in Los Angeles. The event, which was recorded and later posted on YouTube, featured ushers dressed as the 'Cleaners' from the film, and concluded with a Q&A session with Monáe.

On February 1, 2019, Wondaland released a director's cut of Dirty Computer that added an additional thirteen minutes of interviews with Monáe and the picture's creative teams. The extended cut is available to stream exclusively via Amazon Prime Video and Qello.

=== Critical response ===
In a review of the film, Tim Grierson of Rolling Stone called Dirty Computer a "timely new sci-fi masterpiece", noting that the "dazzling" and "visually arresting" release is "filled with sterling electro-pop from the [album], but its dense thematic nods to sci-fi landmarks aren’t meant simply as fun spot-the-reference Easter eggs". In a positive review for Thirty, Flirty + Film, Cate Young wrote that the film and its companion album "complement each other perfectly", adding that the two work together to "create a new synergistic, world in which revolution is demanded as a means to survival and the lives of black queer people are central and will be defended ... what Monáe created here is a feminist statement of intent, and it should be celebrated." Stephen Abblitt of Medium called the short film "a stunning, provocative culmination of, or conclusion to, a decade-long science-fictional aural exploration by Monáe of love, identity, sexuality, revolution, time travel, and androids".

Dirty Computer was a finalist for the 2019 Hugo Award for Best Dramatic Presentation (Short Form).
