= 61st Annual Grammy Awards =

2019 US music awards ceremony

- Official poster
- Date: February 10, 2019; 5:00–8:45 p.m. PST
- Location: Staples Center, Los Angeles
- Hosted by: Alicia Keys

Highlights
- Most awards: Childish Gambino; Kacey Musgraves (4 each)
- Most nominations: Kendrick Lamar (8)
- Website: https://www.grammy.com/grammys/awards/61st-annual-grammy-awards-2018

Television/radio coverage
- Network: CBS
- Viewership: 19.9 million

The 61st Annual Grammy Awards ceremony was held on February 10, 2019, at the Staples Center in Los Angeles. Singer-songwriter Alicia Keys hosted. During her opening monologue, Keys brought out Lady Gaga, Jada Pinkett Smith, Jennifer Lopez, and former First Lady of the United States Michelle Obama, each of whom spoke about the impact that music had on their lives.

The ceremony recognized the best recordings, compositions, and artists of the eligibility year, which ran from October 1, 2017, to September 30, 2018. Nominations were announced on December 7, 2018.

Dolly Parton was honored as the MusiCares Person of the Year two days prior on February 8, 2019.

Kendrick Lamar received the most nominations, with eight. Childish Gambino and Kacey Musgraves tied for the most wins of the night with four each. Childish Gambino did not attend the ceremony and became the first major award winner to be absent since Amy Winehouse in 2008. "This Is America" producer Ludwig Göransson and recording engineer Riley Mackin accepted the Record of the Year Grammy on Gambino's behalf.

== Nominations announcement ==
Nominations were to be announced on December 5, 2018, but were delayed to Friday, December 7, 2018 following the death and state funeral of former President George H.W. Bush.

== Performers ==
Artist(s)	Song(s)
Camila Cabello; J Balvin; Ricky Martin; Young Thug; Arturo Sandoval	"Havana" "Pégate" "Mi Gente"
Shawn Mendes; Miley Cyrus	"In My Blood"
Kacey Musgraves	"Rainbow"
Janelle Monáe	"Make Me Feel" "Django Jane" "Pynk"
Post Malone; Red Hot Chili Peppers	"Stay" "Rockstar" "Dark Necessities"
Kacey Musgraves; Katy Perry; Dolly Parton; Miley Cyrus; Maren Morris; Little Big Town	Tribute to Dolly Parton "Here You Come Again" "Jolene" "After the Gold Rush" "Red Shoes" "9 to 5"
H.E.R.	"Hard Place"
Cardi B Chloe Flower	"Money"
Alicia Keys	"Maple Leaf Rag" "Killing Me Softly with His Song" "Lucid Dreams" "Unforgettable" "Clocks" "Use Somebody" "Boo'd Up" "In My Feelings" "Doo Wop (That Thing)" "Empire State of Mind"
Dan + Shay	"Tequila"
Diana Ross	"The Best Years of My Life" "Reach Out and Touch (Somebody's Hand)"
Lady Gaga; Mark Ronson; Andrew Wyatt; Anthony Rossomando	"Shallow"
Travis Scott; James Blake; Philip Bailey	"Stop Trying to Be God" "No Bystanders"
Jennifer Lopez; Smokey Robinson; Alicia Keys; Ne-Yo	Motown 60: A Grammy Celebration "Dancing in the Street" "Please Mr. Postman" "Money (That's What I Want)" "Do You Love Me" "ABC" "My Girl" "Papa Was a Rollin' Stone" "War" "Square Biz" "Another Star"
Brandi Carlile	"The Joke"
Chloe x Halle	Tribute to Donny Hathaway "Where Is the Love"
St. Vincent; Dua Lipa	"Masseduction" "One Kiss"
Fantasia; Andra Day; Yolanda Adams	Tribute to Aretha Franklin "(You Make Me Feel Like) A Natural Woman"

== Presenters ==
- Devin McCourty and Julian Edelman – presented Best Pop Duo/Group Performance
- Nina Dobrev – introduced Kacey Musgraves
- Alicia Keys and John Mayer – presented Song of the Year
- Anna Kendrick – introduced Kacey Musgraves, Katy Perry, Miley Cyrus, Little Big Town, Maren Morris, and Dolly Parton
- Alicia Keys – introduced Shawn Mendes and Miley Cyrus
- Kane Brown, Meghan Trainor, Luke Combs – presented Best Country Album
- Dan + Shay – presented Best Rap Song
- Alicia Keys – introduced Post Malone and Red Hot Chili Peppers
- Raif-Henok Emmanuel Kendrick – introduced Diana Ross
- Alicia Keys – introduced Lady Gaga
- Eve and Swizz Beatz – introduced Travis Scott, James Blake, and Philip Bailey
- Alicia Keys and Smokey Robinson – introduced Jennifer Lopez, Smokey Robinson, and Ne-Yo
- BTS – presented Best R&B Album
- Kelsea Ballerini – introduced Brandi Carlile
- Leon Bridges and Charlie Wilson – introduced Chloe x Halle
- Chloe x Halle – presented Best Rap Album
- Wilmer Valderrama – introduced St. Vincent and Dua Lipa
- Alessia Cara and Bob Newhart – presented Best New Artist
- Jimmy Jam – introduced outgoing President of the Recording Academy Neil Portnow
- Neil Portnow – introduced in memoriam montage
- Alicia Keys – announced Producer of the Year, Non-Classical and Best Engineered Album, Non-Classical
- Alicia Keys – presented Record of the Year and Album of the Year

=== Premiere ceremony ===
Listed in no particular order.

- Shaggy
- Lzzy Hale of Halestorm
- Kalani Pe'a
- Questlove
- Cécile McLorin Salvant
- Tokimonsta
- Jimmy Jam

== Nominations and winners ==
Winners are highlighted in Bold

=== General ===
==== Record of the Year ====
- **"This Is America" – Childish Gambino**
  - **Donald Glover & Ludwig Göransson, producers; Derek "MixedByAli" Ali, Riley Mackin & Shaan Singh, engineers/mixers; Mike Bozzi, mastering engineer**
- "I Like It" – Cardi B, Bad Bunny & J Balvin
  - Invincible, J. White Did It, Craig Kallman & Tainy, producers; Leslie Brathwaite, Kuk Harrell, Evan LaRay & Simone Torres, engineers/mixers; Colin Leonard, mastering engineer
- "The Joke" – Brandi Carlile
  - Dave Cobb & Shooter Jennings, producers; Tom Elmhirst & Eddie Spear, engineers/mixers; Pete Lyman, mastering engineer
- "God's Plan" – Drake
  - Boi-1Da, Cardo & Young Exclusive, producers; Noel Cadastre, Noel "Gadget" Campbell & Noah Shebib, engineers/mixers; Chris Athens, mastering engineer
- "Shallow" – Lady Gaga & Bradley Cooper
  - Lady Gaga & Benjamin Rice, producers; Brandon Bost & Tom Elmhirst, engineers/mixers; Randy Merrill, mastering engineer
- "All the Stars" – Kendrick Lamar & SZA
  - Al Shux & Sounwave, producers; Sam Ricci & Matt Schaeffer, engineers/mixers; Mike Bozzi, mastering engineer
- "Rockstar" – Post Malone featuring 21 Savage
  - Louis Bell & Tank God, producers; Louis Bell, Lorenzo Cardona, Manny Marroquin & Ethan Stevens, engineers/mixers; Mike Bozzi, mastering engineer
- "The Middle" – Zedd, Maren Morris and Grey
  - Grey, Monsters & Strangerz & Zedd, producers; Grey, Tom Morris, Ryan Shanahan & Zedd, engineers/mixers; Mike Marsh, mastering engineer

==== Album of the Year ====
- **Golden Hour** – **Kacey Musgraves**
  - **Ian Fitchuk, Kacey Musgraves & Daniel Tashian, producers; Craig Alvin & Shawn Everett, engineers/mixers; Ian Fitchuk, Kacey Musgraves & Daniel Tashian, songwriters; Greg Calbi & Steve Fallone, mastering engineers**
- Invasion of Privacy – Cardi B
  - Leslie Brathwaite & Evan LaRay, engineers/mixers; Belcalis Almanzar & Jorden Thorpe, songwriters; Colin Leonard, mastering engineer
- By the Way, I Forgive You – Brandi Carlile
  - Dave Cobb & Shooter Jennings, producers; Dave Cobb & Eddie Spear, engineers/mixers; Brandi Carlile, Phil Hanseroth & Tim Hanseroth, songwriters; Pete Lyman, mastering engineer
- Scorpion – Drake
  - Noel Cadastre, Noel "Gadget" Campbell & Noah Shebib, engineers/mixers; Aubrey Graham & Noah Shebib, songwriters; Chris Athens, mastering engineer
- H.E.R. – H.E.R.
  - Darhyl "Hey DJ" Camper Jr., David "Swagg R'Celious" Harris, H.E.R., Walter Jones & Jeff Robinson, producers; Miki Tsutsumi, engineer/mixer; Darhyl Camper Jr. & H.E.R., songwriters; Dave Kutch, mastering engineer
- Beerbongs & Bentleys – Post Malone
  - Louis Bell & Post Malone, producers; Louis Bell & Manny Marroquin, engineers/mixers; Louis Bell & Austin Post, songwriters; Mike Bozzi, mastering engineer
- Dirty Computer – Janelle Monáe
  - Chuck Lightning, Janelle Monáe Robinson & Nate "Rocket" Wonder, producers; Mick Guzauski, Janelle Monáe Robinson & Nate "Rocket" Wonder, engineers/mixers; Nathaniel Irvin III, Charles Joseph II, Taylor Parks & Janelle Monáe Robinson, songwriters; Chris Gehringer, mastering engineer
- Black Panther: The Album, Music From and Inspired By – (Various Artists)
  - Kendrick Lamar, featured artist; Kendrick Duckworth & Sounwave, producers; Matt Schaeffer, engineer/mixer; Kendrick Duckworth & Mark Spears, songwriters; Mike Bozzi, mastering engineer

==== Song of the Year ====
- **"This Is America"**
  - **Donald Glover, Ludwig Göransson & Jeffrey Lamar Williams, songwriters (Childish Gambino)**
- "All the Stars"
  - Kendrick Duckworth, Solána Rowe, Al Shuckburgh, Mark Spears & Anthony Tiffith, songwriters (Kendrick Lamar & SZA)
- "Boo'd Up"
  - Larrance Dopson, Joelle James, Ella Mai & Dijon McFarlane, songwriters (Ella Mai)
- "God's Plan"
  - Aubrey Graham, Daveon Jackson, Brock Korsan, Ron LaTour, Matthew Samuels & Noah Shebib, songwriters (Drake)
- "In My Blood"
  - Teddy Geiger, Scott Harris, Shawn Mendes & Geoffrey Warburton, songwriters (Shawn Mendes)
- "The Joke"
  - Brandi Carlile, Dave Cobb, Phil Hanseroth & Tim Hanseroth, songwriters (Brandi Carlile)
- "The Middle"
  - Sarah Aarons, Jordan K. Johnson, Stefan Johnson, Marcus Lomax, Kyle Trewartha, Michael Trewartha & Anton Zaslavski, songwriters (Zedd, Maren Morris & Grey)
- "Shallow"
  - Lady Gaga, Mark Ronson, Anthony Rossomando & Andrew Wyatt, songwriters (Lady Gaga & Bradley Cooper)

==== Best New Artist ====
- **Dua Lipa**
- Chloe x Halle
- Luke Combs
- Greta Van Fleet
- H.E.R.
- Margo Price
- Bebe Rexha
- Jorja Smith

=== Pop ===
Best Pop Solo Performance

- **"Joanne (Where Do You Think You're Goin'?)" – Lady Gaga**
- "Colors" – Beck
- "Havana" (Live) – Camila Cabello
- "God Is a Woman" – Ariana Grande
- "Better Now" – Post Malone

Best Pop Duo/Group Performance

- **"Shallow" – Lady Gaga & Bradley Cooper**
- "Fall in Line" – Christina Aguilera featuring Demi Lovato
- "Don't Go Breaking My Heart" – Backstreet Boys
- "'S Wonderful" – Tony Bennett & Diana Krall
- "Girls Like You" – Maroon 5 featuring Cardi B
- "Say Something" – Justin Timberlake featuring Chris Stapleton
- "The Middle" – Zedd, Maren Morris and Grey

Best Traditional Pop Vocal Album

- **My Way – Willie Nelson**
- Love Is Here to Stay – Tony Bennett & Diana Krall
- Nat King Cole & Me – Gregory Porter
- Standards (Deluxe) – Seal
- The Music...The Mem'ries...The Magic! – Barbra Streisand

Best Pop Vocal Album

- **Sweetener – Ariana Grande**
- Camila – Camila Cabello
- Meaning of Life – Kelly Clarkson
- Shawn Mendes – Shawn Mendes
- Beautiful Trauma – P!nk
- Reputation – Taylor Swift

=== Dance/Electronic Music ===
Best Dance Recording

- **"Electricity" – Silk City & Dua Lipa featuring Diplo & Mark Ronson**
  - **Jarami, Alex Metric, Riton & Silk City, producers; Josh Gudwin, mixer**
- "Northern Soul" – Above & Beyond featuring Richard Bedford
  - Above & Beyond & Andrew Bayer, producers; Above & Beyond, mixers
- "Ultimatum" – Disclosure featuring Fatoumata Diawara
  - Guy Lawrence & Howard Lawrence, producers; Guy Lawrence, mixer
- "Losing It" – Fisher
  - Paul Nicholas Fisher, producer; Kevin Grainger, mixer
- "Ghost Voices" – Virtual Self
  - Porter Robinson, producer; Porter Robinson, mixer

Best Dance/Electronic Album

- **Woman Worldwide – Justice**
- Singularity – Jon Hopkins
- Treehouse – Sofi Tukker
- Oil of Every Pearl's Un-Insides – SOPHIE
- Lune Rouge – TOKiMONSTA

=== Contemporary Instrumental Music ===
Best Contemporary Instrumental Album

- **Steve Gadd Band – Steve Gadd Band**
- The Emancipation Procrastination – Christian Scott aTunde Adjuah
- Modern Lore – Julian Lage
- Laid Black – Marcus Miller
- Protocol IV – Simon Phillips

=== Rock ===
Best Rock Performance

- **"When Bad Does Good" – Chris Cornell** (posthumous)
- "Four Out of Five" – Arctic Monkeys
- "Made an America" – Fever 333
- "Highway Tune" – Greta Van Fleet
- "Uncomfortable" – Halestorm

Best Metal Performance

- **"Electric Messiah" – High on Fire**
- "Condemned to the Gallows" – Between the Buried and Me
- "Honeycomb" – Deafheaven
- "Betrayer" – Trivium
- "On My Teeth" – Underoath

Best Rock Song

- **"Masseduction"**
  - **Jack Antonoff & Annie Clark, songwriters (St. Vincent)**
- "Black Smoke Rising"
  - Jacob Thomas Kiszka, Joshua Michael Kiszka, Samuel Francis Kiszka, & Daniel Robert Wagner, songwriters (Greta Van Fleet)
- "Jumpsuit"
  - Tyler Joseph, songwriter (Twenty One Pilots)
- "Mantra"
  - Jordan Fish, Matthew Kean, Lee Malia, Matthew Nicholls, & Oliver Sykes, songwriters (Bring Me the Horizon)
- "Rats"
  - Tom Dalgety & A Ghoul Writer, songwriters (Ghost)

Best Rock Album

- **From the Fires – Greta Van Fleet**
- Rainier Fog – Alice in Chains
- Mania – Fall Out Boy
- Prequelle – Ghost
- Pacific Daydream – Weezer

=== Alternative ===
Best Alternative Music Album

- **Colors – Beck**
- Tranquility Base Hotel & Casino – Arctic Monkeys
- Utopia – Björk
- American Utopia – David Byrne
- Masseduction – St. Vincent

=== R&B ===
Best R&B Performance

- **"Best Part" – H.E.R. featuring Daniel Caesar**
- "Long as I Live" – Toni Braxton
- "Summer" – The Carters
- "Y O Y" – Lalah Hathaway
- "First Began" – PJ Morton

Best Traditional R&B Performance

- **"Bet Ain't Worth the Hand" – Leon Bridges**
- **"How Deep Is Your Love" – PJ Morton featuring Yebba**
- "Don't Fall Apart on Me Tonight" – Bettye LaVette
- "Honest" – MAJOR.
- "Made for Love" – Charlie Wilson featuring Lalah Hathaway

Best R&B Song

- **"Boo'd Up"**
  - **Larrance Dopson, Joelle James, Ella Mai & Dijon McFarlane, songwriters (Ella Mai)**
- "Come Through and Chill"
  - Jermaine Cole, Miguel Pimentel & Salaam Remi, songwriters (Miguel featuring J. Cole & Salaam Remi)
- "Feels Like Summer"
  - Donald Glover & Ludwig Göransson, songwriters (Childish Gambino)
- "Focus"
  - Darhyl Camper Jr., H.E.R. & Justin Love, songwriters (H.E.R.)
- "Long as I Live"
  - Paul Boutin, Toni Braxton & Antonio Dixon, songwriters (Toni Braxton)

Best Urban Contemporary Album

- **Everything Is Love – The Carters**
- The Kids Are Alright – Chloe x Halle
- Chris Dave and the Drumhedz – Chris Dave and the Drumhedz
- War & Leisure – Miguel
- Ventriloquism – Meshell Ndegeocello

Best R&B Album

- **H.E.R. – H.E.R.**
- Sex & Cigarettes – Toni Braxton
- Good Thing – Leon Bridges
- Honestly – Lalah Hathaway
- Gumbo Unplugged – PJ Morton

=== Rap ===
Best Rap Performance

- **"King's Dead" – Kendrick Lamar, Jay Rock, Future & James Blake**
- **"Bubblin" – Anderson .Paak**
- "Be Careful" – Cardi B
- "Nice for What" – Drake
- "Sicko Mode" – Travis Scott, Drake & Swae Lee

Best Rap/Sung Performance

- **"This Is America" – Childish Gambino**
- "Like I Do" – Christina Aguilera featuring Goldlink
- "Pretty Little Fears" – 6lack featuring J. Cole
- "All the Stars" – Kendrick Lamar & SZA
- "Rockstar" – Post Malone featuring 21 Savage

Best Rap Song

- **"God's Plan"**
  - **Aubrey Graham, Daveon Jackson, Brock Korsan, Ron LaTour, Matthew Samuels & Noah Shebib, songwriters (Drake)**
- "King's Dead"
  - Kendrick Duckworth, Samuel Gloade, James Litherland, Johnny McKinzie, Axel Morgan, Mark Spears, Travis Walton, Nayvadius Wilburn & Michael Williams II, songwriters (Kendrick Lamar, Jay Rock, Future & James Blake)
- "Lucky You"
  - R. Fraser, G. Lucas, M. Mathers, M. Samuels & J. Sweet, songwriters (Eminem featuring Joyner Lucas)
- "Sicko Mode"
  - Khalif Brown, Rogét Chahayed, BryTavious Chambers, Mike Dean, Mirsad Dervic, Kevin Gomringer, Tim Gomringer, Aubrey Graham, Chauncey Hollis, Jacques Webster, Ozan Yildirim & Cydel Young, songwriters (Travis Scott, Drake & Swae Lee)
- "Win"
  - K. Duckworth, A. Hernandez, J. McKinzie, M. Samuels & C. Thompson, songwriters (Jay Rock)

Best Rap Album

- **Invasion of Privacy – Cardi B**
- Swimming – Mac Miller
- Victory Lap – Nipsey Hussle
- Daytona – Pusha T
- Astroworld – Travis Scott

=== Country ===
Best Country Solo Performance

- **"Butterflies" – Kacey Musgraves**
- "Wouldn't It Be Great?" – Loretta Lynn
- "Mona Lisas and Mad Hatters" – Maren Morris
- "Millionaire" – Chris Stapleton
- "Parallel Line" – Keith Urban

Best Country Duo/Group Performance

- **"Tequila" – Dan + Shay**
- "Shoot Me Straight" – Brothers Osborne
- "When Someone Stops Loving You" – Little Big Town
- "Dear Hate" – Maren Morris featuring Vince Gill
- "Meant to Be" – Bebe Rexha & Florida Georgia Line

Best Country Song

- **"Space Cowboy"**
  - **Luke Laird, Shane McAnally & Kacey Musgraves, songwriters (Kacey Musgraves)**
- "Break Up in the End"
  - Jessie Jo Dillon, Chase McGill & Jon Nite, songwriters (Cole Swindell)
- "Dear Hate"
  - Tom Douglas, David Hodges & Maren Morris, songwriters (Maren Morris featuring Vince Gill)
- "I Lived It"
  - Rhett Akins, Ross Copperman, Ashley Gorley & Ben Hayslip, songwriters (Blake Shelton)
- "Tequila"
  - Nicolle Galyon, Jordan Reynolds & Dan Smyers, songwriters (Dan + Shay)
- "When Someone Stops Loving You"
  - Hillary Lindsey, Chase McGill & Lori McKenna, songwriters (Little Big Town)

Best Country Album

- **Golden Hour** – **Kacey Musgraves**
- Unapologetically – Kelsea Ballerini
- Port Saint Joe – Brothers Osborne
- Girl Going Nowhere – Ashley McBryde
- From a Room: Volume 2 – Chris Stapleton

=== New Age ===
Best New Age Album

- **Opium Moon – Opium Moon**
- Hiraeth – Lisa Gerrard & David Kuckhermann
- Beloved – Snatam Kaur
- Molecules of Motion – Steve Roach
- Moku Maluhia: Peaceful Island – Jim Kimo West

=== Jazz ===
Best Improvised Jazz Solo

- **"Don't Fence Me In" – John Daversa, soloist**
- "Some of That Sunshine" – Regina Carter, soloist
- "We See" – Fred Hersch, soloists
- "De-Dah" – Brad Mehldau, soloist
- "Cadenas" – Miguel Zenón, soloist

Best Jazz Vocal Album

- **The Window – Cécile McLorin Salvant**
- My Mood Is You – Freddy Cole
- The Questions – Kurt Elling
- The Subject Tonight Is Love – Kate McGarry with Keith Ganz & Gary Versace
- If You Really Want – Raul Midón with Metropole Orkest conducted by Vince Mendoza

Best Jazz Instrumental Album

- **Emanon – The Wayne Shorter Quartet**
- Diamond Cut – Tia Fuller
- Live in Europe – Fred Hersch Trio
- Seymour Reads the Constitution! – Brad Mehldau Trio
- Still Dreaming – Joshua Redman, Ron Miles, Scott Colley & Brian Blade

Best Large Jazz Ensemble Album

- **American Dreamers: Voices of Hope, Music of Freedom – John Daversa Big Band featuring DACA Artists**
- All About That Basie – Count Basie Orchestra directed by Scotty Barnhart
- Presence – Orrin Evans and the Captain Black Big Band
- All Can Work – John Hollenbeck Large Ensemble
- Barefoot Dances and Other Visions – Jim McNeely & The Frankfurt Radio Big Band

Best Latin Jazz Album

- **Back to the Sunset – Dafnis Prieto Big Band**
- Heart of Brazil – Eddie Daniels
- West Side Story Reimagined – Bobby Sanabria Multiverse Big Band
- Cinque – Elio Villafranca
- Yo Soy La Tradición – Miguel Zenón featuring Spektral Quartet

=== Gospel/Contemporary Christian Music ===
Best Gospel Performance/Song

- **"Never Alone" – Tori Kelly featuring Kirk Franklin**
  - **Kirk Franklin & Victoria Kelly, songwriters**
- "You Will Win" – Jekalyn Carr
  - Allen Carr & Jekalyn Carr, songwriters
- "Won't He Do It" – Koryn Hawthorne
  - Koryn Hawthorne
- "Cycles" – Jonathan McReynolds featuring DOE
  - Jonathan McReynolds & Will Reagan, songwriters
- "A Great Work" – Brian Courtney Wilson
  - Aaron W. Lindsey, Alvin Richardson & Brian Courtney Wilson, songwriters

Best Contemporary Christian Music Performance/Song

- **"You Say" – Lauren Daigle**
  - **Lauren Daigle, Jason Ingram & Paul Mabury, songwriters**
- "Reckless Love" – Cory Asbury
  - Cory Asbury, Caleb Culver & Ran Jackson, songwriters
- "Joy." – For King & Country
  - Ben Glover, Matt Hales, Stephen Blake Kanicka, Seth Mosley, Joel Smallbone, Luke Smallbone & Tedd Tjornhom, songwriters
- "Grace Got You" – MercyMe featuring John Reuben
  - David Garcia, Ben Glover, MercyMe, Solomon Olds & John Reuben, songwriters
- "Known" – Tauren Wells
  - Ethan Hulse, Jordan Sapp & Tauren Wells, songwriters

Best Gospel Album

- **Hiding Place – Tori Kelly**
- One Nation Under God – Jekalyn Carr
- Make Room – Jonathan McReynolds
- The Other Side – The Walls Group
- A Great Work – Brian Courtney Wilson

Best Contemporary Christian Music Album

- **Look Up Child – Lauren Daigle**
- Hallelujah Here Below – Elevation Worship
- Living With a Fire – Jesus Culture
- Surrounded – Michael W. Smith
- Survivor: Live from Harding Prison – Zach Williams

Best Roots Gospel Album

- **Unexpected – Jason Crabb**
- Clear Skies – Ernie Haase & Signature Sound
- Favorites: Revisited by Request – The Isaacs
- Still Standing – The Martins
- Love Love Love – Gordon Mote

=== Latin ===
Best Latin Pop Album

- **Sincera – Claudia Brant**
- Prometo – Pablo Alborán
- Musas (Un Homenaje al Folclore Latinoamericano en Manos de Los Macorinos), Vol 2 – Natalia Lafourcade
- 2:00 AM – Raquel Sofía
- Vives – Carlos Vives

Best Latin Rock, Urban or Alternative Album

- **Aztlán – Zoé**
- Claroscura – Aterciopelados
- COASTCITY – COASTCITY
- Encanto Tropical – Monsieur Periné
- Gourmet – Orishas

Best Regional Mexican Music Album (Including Tejano)

- **¡México Por Siempre! – Luis Miguel**
- Primero Soy Mexicana – Ángela Aguilar
- Mitad y Mitad – Calibre 50
- Totalmente Juan Gabriel Vol. II – Aida Cuevas
- Cruzando Borders – Los Texmaniacs
- Leyendas de Mi Pueblo – Mariachi Sol de Mexico de José Hernández

Best Tropical Latin Album

- **Anniversary – Spanish Harlem Orchestra**
- Pa' Mi Gente – Charlie Aponte
- Legado – Formell y Los Van Van
- Orquesta Akokán – Orquesta Akokán
- Ponle Actitud – Felipe Peláez

=== American Roots Music ===
Best American Roots Performance

- **"The Joke" – Brandi Carlile**
- "Kick Rocks" – Sean Ardoin
- "St. James Infirmary Blues" – Jon Batiste
- "All on My Mind" – Anderson East
- "Last Man Standing" – Willie Nelson

Best American Roots Song

- **"The Joke"**
  - **Brandi Carlile, Dave Cobb, Phil Hanseroth & Tim Hanseroth, songwriters (Brandi Carlile)**
- "All the Trouble"
  - Waylon Payne, Lee Ann Womack & Adam Wright, songwriters (Lee Ann Womack)
- "Build a Bridge"
  - Jeff Tweedy, songwriter (Mavis Staples)
- "Knockin' on Your Screen Door"
  - Pat McLaughlin & John Prine, songwriters (John Prine)
- "Summer's End"
  - Pat McLaughlin & John Prine, songwriters (John Prine)

Best Americana Album

- **By the Way, I Forgive You – Brandi Carlile**
- Things Have Changed – Bettye LaVette
- The Tree of Forgiveness – John Prine
- The Lonely, the Lonesome & the Gone – Lee Ann Womack
- One Drop of Truth – The Wood Brothers

Best Bluegrass Album

- **The Travelin' McCourys – The Travelin' McCourys**
- Portraits in Fiddles – Mike Barnett
- Sister Sadie II – Sister Sadie
- Rivers and Roads – The Special Consensus
- North of Despair – Wood & Wire

Best Traditional Blues Album

- **The Blues Is Alive and Well – Buddy Guy**
- Something Smells Funky 'Round Here – Elvin Bishop's Big Fun Trio
- Benton County Relic – Cedric Burnside
- No Mercy in This Land – Ben Harper and Charlie Musselwhite
- Don't You Feel My Leg (The Naughty Bawdy Blues of Blue Lu Barker) – Maria Muldaur

Best Contemporary Blues Album

- **Please Don't Be Dead – Fantastic Negrito**
- Here in Babylon – Teresa James & the Rhythm Tramps
- Cry No More – Danielle Nicole
- Out of the Blues – Boz Scaggs
- Victor Wainwright and the Train – Victor Wainwright and the Train

Best Folk Album

- **All Ashore – Punch Brothers**
- Whistle Down the Wind – Joan Baez
- Black Cowboys – Dom Flemons
- Rifles & Rosary Beads – Mary Gauthier
- Weed Garden – Iron & Wine

Best Regional Roots Music Album

- **No 'Ane'i – Kalani Pe'a**
- Kreole Rock and Soul – Sean Ardoin
- Spyboy – Cha Wa
- Aloha from Na Hoa – Na Hoa
- Mewasinsational: Cree Round Dance Songs – Young Spirit

=== Reggae ===
Best Reggae Album

- **44/876 – Sting & Shaggy**
- As the World Turns – Black Uhuru
- Reggae Forever – Etana
- Rebellion Rises – Ziggy Marley
- A Matter of Time – Protoje

=== World Music ===
Best World Music Album

- **Freedom – Soweto Gospel Choir**
- Deran – Bombino
- Fenfo – Fatoumata Diawara
- Black Times – Seun Kuti & Egypt 80
- The Lost Songs of World War II – Yiddish Glory

=== Children's ===
Best Children's Album

- **All the Sounds – Lucy Kalantari & The Jazz Cats**
- Building Blocks – Tim Kubart
- Falu's Bazaar – Falu
- Giants of Science – The Pop Ups
- The Nation of Imagine – FRANK & DEANE

=== Spoken Word ===
Best Spoken Word Album (Includes Poetry, Audio Books & Storytelling)

- **Faith: A Journey for All – Jimmy Carter**
- Accessory to War – Courtney B. Vance
- Calypso – David Sedaris
- Creative Quest – Questlove
- The Last Black Unicorn – Tiffany Haddish

=== Comedy ===
Best Comedy Album

- **Equanimity & The Bird Revelation – Dave Chappelle**
- Annihilation – Patton Oswalt
- Noble Ape – Jim Gaffigan
- Standup for Drummers – Fred Armisen
- Tamborine – Chris Rock

=== Musical Theater ===
Best Musical Theater Album

- **The Band's Visit – Etai Benson, Adam Kantor, Katrina Lenk & Ari'el Stachel, principal soloists; Dean Sharenow & David Yazbek, producers; David Yazbek, composer & lyricist (Original Broadway Cast)**
- Carousel – Renée Fleming, Alexander Gemignani, Joshua Henry, Lindsay Mendez & Jessie Mueller, principal soloists; Steven Epstein, producer (Richard Rodgers, composer; Oscar Hammerstein II, lyricist) (2018 Broadway Cast)
- Jesus Christ Superstar Live in Concert – Sara Bareilles, Alice Cooper, Ben Daniels, Brandon Victor Dixon, Erik Grönwall, Jin Ha, John Legend, Norm Lewis & Jason Tam, principal soloists; Andrew Lloyd Webber & Harvey Mason Jr., producers (Andrew Lloyd Webber, composer; Tim Rice, lyricist) (Original Television Cast)
- My Fair Lady – Lauren Ambrose, Norbert Leo Butz & Harry Hadden-Paton, principal soloists; Van Dean, David Lai, & Ted Sperling, producers (Frederick Loewe, composer; Alan Jay Lerner, lyricist) (2018 Broadway Cast)
- Once on This Island – Phillip Boykin, Merle Dandridge, Quentin Earl Darrington, Hailey Kilgore, Kenita R. Miller, Alex Newell, Isaac Powell & Lea Salonga, principal soloists; Lynn Ahrens, Stephen Flaherty & Elliot Scheiner, producers (Stephen Flaherty, composer; Lynn Ahrens, lyricist) (New Broadway Cast)

=== Music for Visual Media ===
Best Compilation Soundtrack for Visual Media

- **The Greatest Showman – Hugh Jackman (& various artists)**
  - **Alex Lacamoire, Benj Pasek, Justin Paul & Greg Wells, compilation producers**
- Call Me by Your Name – (Various artists)
  - Luca Guadagnino, compilation producer; Robin Urdang, music supervisor
- Deadpool 2 – (Various artists)
  - David Leitch & Ryan Reynolds, compilation producers; John Houlihan, music supervisor
- Lady Bird – (Various artists)
  - Timothy J. Smith, compilation producer; Michael Hill & Brian Ross, music supervisors
- Stranger Things – (Various artists)
  - Matt Duffer, Ross Duffer, Timothy J. Smith, compilation producer; Nora Felder, music supervisor

Best Score Soundtrack for Visual Media

- **Black Panther – Ludwig Göransson, composer**
- Blade Runner 2049 – Benjamin Wallfisch & Hans Zimmer, composers
- Coco – Michael Giacchino, composer
- The Shape of Water – Alexandre Desplat, composer
- Star Wars: The Last Jedi – John Williams, composer

Best Song Written for Visual Media

- **"Shallow" (from A Star Is Born)**
  - **Lady Gaga, Mark Ronson, Anthony Rossomando & Andrew Wyatt, songwriters (Lady Gaga & Bradley Cooper)**
- "All the Stars" (from Black Panther)
  - Kendrick Duckworth, Solána Rowe, Alexander William Shuckburgh, Mark Anthony Spears & Anthony Tiffith, songwriters (Kendrick Lamar & SZA)
- "Mystery of Love" (from Call Me by Your Name)
  - Sufjan Stevens, songwriter (Sufjan Stevens)
- "Remember Me" (from Coco)
  - Kristen Anderson-Lopez & Robert Lopez, songwriters (Miguel featuring Natalia Lafourcade)
- "This Is Me" (from The Greatest Showman)
  - Benj Pasek & Justin Paul, songwriters (Keala Settle & The Greatest Showman Ensemble)

=== Composing ===
Best Instrumental Composition

- **"Blut und Boden (Blood and Soil)"**
  - **Terence Blanchard, composer (Terence Blanchard)**
- "Chrysalis"
  - Jeremy Kittel, composer (Kittel & Co.)
- "Infinity War"
  - Alan Silvestri, composer (Alan Silvestri)
- "Mine Mission"
  - John Powell & John Williams, composers (John Powell & John Williams)
- "The Shape of Water"
  - Alexandre Desplat, composer (Alexandre Desplat)

=== Arranging ===
Best Arrangement, Instrumental or A Cappella

- **"Stars and Stripes Forever"**
  - **John Daversa, arranger (John Daversa Big Band featuring DACA Artists)**
- "Batman Theme (TV)"
  - Randy Waldman & Justin Wilson, arrangers (Randy Waldman featuring Wynton Marsalis)
- "Change the World"
  - Mark Kibble, arranger (Take 6)
- "Madrid Finale"
  - John Powell, arranger (John Powell)
- "The Shape of Water"
  - Alexandre Desplat, arranger (Alexandre Desplat)

Best Arrangement, Instruments and Vocals

- **"Spiderman Theme"**
  - **Mark Kibble, Randy Waldman & Justin Wilson, arrangers (Randy Waldman featuring Take 6 & Chris Potter)**
- "It Was a Very Good Year"
  - Matt Rollings & Kristin Wilkinson, arrangers (Willie Nelson)
- "Jolene"
  - Dan Pugach & Nicole Zuraitis, arrangers (Dan Pugach)
- "Mona Lisa"
  - Vince Mendoza, arranger (Gregory Porter)
- "Niña"
  - Gonzalo Grau, arranger (Magos Herrera & Brooklyn Rider)

=== Packaging ===
Best Recording Package

- **Masseduction**
  - **Willo Perron, art director (St. Vincent)**
- Be the Cowboy
  - Mary Banas, art director (Mitski)
- Love Yourself: Tear
  - Doohee Lee, art director (BTS)
- The Offering
  - Qing-Yang Xiao, art director (The Chairman)
- Well Kept Thing
  - Adam Moore, art director (Foxhole)

Best Boxed or Special Limited Edition Package

- **Squeeze Box: The Complete Works of "Weird Al" Yankovic**
  - **Meghan Foley, Annie Stoll & Al Yankovic, art directors ("Weird Al" Yankovic)**
- Appetite for Destruction (Locked n' Loaded Box)
  - Arian Buhler, Charles Dooher, Jeff Fura, Scott Sandler & Matt Taylor, art directors (Guns N' Roses)
- I'll Be Your Girl
  - Carson Ellis, Jeri Heiden & Glen Nakasako, art directors (The Decemberists)
- Pacific Northwest '73–'74: The Complete Recordings
  - Lisa Glines, Doran Tyson & Roy Henry Vickers, art directors (Grateful Dead)
- Too Many Bad Habits
  - Sarah Dodds & Shauna Dodds, art directors (Johnny Nicholas)

=== Notes ===
Best Album Notes

- **Voices of Mississippi: Artists and Musicians Documented by William Ferris**
  - **David Evans, album notes writer (Various artists)**
- Alpine Dreaming: The Helvetia Records Story, 1920-1924
  - James P. Leary, album notes writer (Various artists)
- 4 Banjo Songs, 1891-1897: Foundational Recordings of America's Iconic Instrument
  - Richard Martin & Ted Olson, album notes writer (Charles A. Asbury)
- The 1960 Time Sessions
  - Ben Ratliff, album notes writer (Sonny Clark Trio)
- The Product of Our Souls: The Sound and Sway of James Reese Europe's Society Orchestra
  - David Gilbert, album notes writer (Various artists)
- Trouble No More: The Bootleg Series Vol. 13/1979-1981 (Deluxe Edition)
  - Amanda Petrusich, album notes writer (Bob Dylan)

=== Historical ===
Best Historical Album

- **Voices of Mississippi: Artists and Musicians Documented by William Ferris**
  - **William Ferris, April Ledbetter & Steven Lance Ledbetter, compilation producers; Michael Graves, mastering engineer (Various artists)**
- Any Other Way
  - Rob Bowman, Douglas McGowan, Rob Sevier & Ken Shipley, compilation producers; Jeff Lipton & Maria Rice, mastering engineer (Jackie Shane)
- At the Louisiana Hayride Tonight...
  - Martin Hawkins, compilation producer; Christian Zwarg, mastering engineer (Various artists)
- Battleground Korea: Songs and Sounds of America's Forgotten War
  - Hugo Keesing, compilation producer; Christian Zwarg, mastering engineer (Various artists)
- A Rhapsody in Blue: The Extraordinary Life of Oscar Levant
  - Robert Russ, compilation producer; Andreas K. Meyer & Rebekah Wineman, mastering engineers (Oscar Levant)

=== Production, Non-Classical ===
Best Engineered Album, Non-Classical

- **Colors**
  - **Julian Burg, Şerban Ghenea, David "Elevator" Greenbaum, John Hanes, Beck Hansen, Greg Kurstin, Florian Lagatta, Cole M.G.N., Alex Pasco, Jesse Shatkin, Darrell Thorp & Cassidy Turbin, engineers; Chris Bellman, Tom Coyne, Emily Lazar & Randy Merrill, mastering engineers (Beck)**
- All the Things That I Did and All the Things That I Didn't Do
  - Ryan Freeland & Kenneth Pattengale, engineers; Kim Rosen, mastering engineer (The Milk Carton Kids)
- Earthtones
  - Robbie Lackritz, engineer; Philip Shaw Bova, mastering engineer (Bahamas)
- Head Over Heels
  - Nathaniel Alford, Jason Evigan, Chris Galland, Tom Gardner, Patrick "P-Thugg" Gemayel, Şerban Ghenea, John Hanes, Tony Hoffer, Derek Keota, Ian Kirkpatrick, David Macklovitch, Amber Mark, Manny Marroquin, Vaughn Oliver, Chris "TEK" O'Ryan, Morgan Taylor Reid & Gian Stone, engineers; Chris Gehringer & Emerson Mancini, mastering engineers (Chromeo)
- Voicenotes
  - Manny Marroquin & Charlie Puth, engineers; Dave Kutch, mastering engineer (Charlie Puth)

Producer of the Year, Non-Classical

- **Pharrell Williams**
  - "Apeshit" (The Carters)
  - Man of the Woods (Justin Timberlake)
  - No One Ever Really Dies (N.E.R.D)
  - "Stir Fry" (Migos)
  - Sweetener (Ariana Grande)
- Boi-1da
  - "Be Careful" (Cardi B)
  - "Diplomatic Immunity" (Drake)
  - "Friends" (The Carters)
  - "God's Plan" (Drake)
  - "Heard About Us" (The Carters)
  - "Lucky You" (Eminem featuring Joyner Lucas)
  - "Mob Ties" (Drake)
  - "No Limit" (G-Eazy featuring ASAP Rocky & Cardi B)
- Larry Klein
  - "All These Things" (Thomas Dybdahl)
  - Anthem (Madeleine Peyroux)
  - The Book of Longing (Luciana Souza)
  - "Can I Have It All" (Thomas Dybdahl)
  - Junk (Hailey Tuck)
  - "Look at What We've Done" (Thomas Dybdahl)
  - Meaning to Tell Ya (Molly Johnson)
- Linda Perry
  - "Harder, Better, Faster, Stronger" (Willa Amai)
  - Served Like a Girl (Various artists)
  - 28 Days in the Valley (Dorothy)
- Kanye West
  - Daytona (Pusha T)
  - Kids See Ghosts (Kids See Ghosts)
  - K.T.S.E. (Teyana Taylor)
  - Nasir (Nas)
  - Ye (Kanye West)

Best Remixed Recording

- **"Walking Away" (Mura Masa Remix)**
  - **Alex Crossan, remixer (Haim)**
- "Audio" (CID Remix)
  - CID, remixer (LSD)
- "How Long" (EDX's Dubai Skyline Remix)
  - Maurizio Colella & Christian Hirt, remixers (Charlie Puth)
- "Only Road" (Cosmic Gate Remix)
  - Stefan Bossems & Claus Terhoeven, remixers (Gabriel & Dresden featuring Sub Teal)
- "Stargazing" (Kaskade Remix)
  - Kaskade, remixer (Kygo featuring Justin Jesso)

=== Production, Immersive Audio ===
Best Immersive Audio Album

- **Eye in the Sky: 35th Anniversary Edition**
  - **Alan Parsons, surround mix engineer; Dave Donnelly, PJ Olsson & Alan Parsons, surround mastering engineers; Alan Parsons, surround producer (The Alan Parsons Project)**
- Folketoner
  - Morten Lindberg, surround mix engineer; Morten Lindberg, surround mastering engineer; Morten Lindberg, surround producer (Anne Karin Sundal-Ask & Det Norske Jentekor)
- Seven Words from the Cross
  - Daniel Shores, surround mix engineer; Daniel Shores, surround mastering engineer; Dan Merceruio, surround producer (Matthew Guard & Skylark)
- Sommerro: Ujamaa & the Iceberg
  - Morten Lindberg, surround mix engineer; Morten Lindberg, surround mastering engineer; Morten Lindberg, surround producer (Ingar Heine Bergby, Trondheim Symphony Orchestra & Choir)
- Symbol
  - Prashant Mistry & Ronald Prent, surround mix engineers; Darcy Proper, surround mastering engineer; Prashant Mistry & Ronald Prent, surround producers (Engine-Earz Experiment)

=== Production, Classical ===
Best Engineered Album, Classical

- **Shostakovich: Symphonies Nos. 4 & 11**
  - **Shawn Murphy & Nick Squire, engineers; Tim Martyn, mastering engineer (Andris Nelsons & Boston Symphony Orchestra)**
- Bates: The (R)evolution of Steve Jobs
  - Mark Donahue & Dirk Sobotka, engineers; Mark Donahue, mastering engineer (Michael Christie, Garrett Sorenson, Wei Wu, Sasha Cooke, Edwards Parks, Jessica E. Jones & Santa Fe Opera Orchestra)
- Beethoven: Symphony No. 3; Strauss: Horn Concerto No. 1
  - Mark Donahue, engineer; Mark Donahue, mastering engineer (Manfred Honeck & Pittsburgh Symphony Orchestra)
- John Williams at the Movies
  - Keith O. Johnson & Sean Royce Martin, engineers; Keith O. Johnson, mastering engineer (Jerry Junkin & Dallas Winds)
- Liquid Melancholy: Clarinet Music of James M. Stephenson
  - Bill Maylone & Mary Mazurek, engineers; Bill Maylone, mastering engineer (John Bruce Yeh)
- Visions and Variations
  - Tom Caulfield, engineer; Jesse Lewis, mastering engineer (A Far Cry)

Producer of the Year, Classical

- **Blanton Alspaugh**
  - Arnesen: Infinity – Choral Works (Joel Rinsema & Kantorei)
  - Aspects of America (Carlos Kalmar & Oregon Symphony)
  - Chesnokov: Teach Me Thy Statutes (Vladimir Gorbik & PaTRAM Institute Male Choir)
  - Gordon, R.: The House Without a Christmas Tree (Bradley Moore, Elisabeth Leone, Maximillian Macias, Megan Mikailovna Samarin, Patricia Schuman, Lauren Snouffer, Heidi Stober, Daniel Belcher, Houston Grand Opera Juvenile Chorus & Houston Grand Opera Orchestra)
  - Haydn: The Creation (Andrés Orozco-Estrada, Betsy Cook Weber, Houston Symphony & Houston Symphony Chorus)
  - Heggie: Great Scott (Patrick Summers, Manuel Palazzo, Mark Hancock, Michael Mayes, Rodell Rosel, Kevin Burdette, Anthony Roth Costanzo, Nathan Gunn, Frederica von Stade, Ailyn Pérez, Joyce DiDonato, Dallas Opera Chorus & Orchestra)
  - Music of Fauré, Buide & Zemlinsky (Trio Séléné)
  - Paterson: Three Way – A Trio of One-Act Operas (Dean Williamson, Daniele Pastin, Courtney Ruckman, Eliza Bonet, Melisa Bonetti, Jordan Rutter, Samuel Levine, Wes Mason, Matthew Treviño & Nashville Opera Orchestra)
  - Vaughan Williams: Piano Concerto; Oboe Concerto; Serenade to Music; Flos Campi (Peter Oundjian & Toronto Symphony Orchestra)
- David Frost
  - Beethoven: Piano Sonatas, Volume 7 (Jonathan Biss)
  - Mirror in Mirror (Anne Akiko Meyers, Kristjan Järvi & Philharmonia Orchestra)
  - Mozart: Idomeneo (James Levine, Alan Opie, Matthew Polenzani, Alice Coote, Nadine Sierra, Elza van den Heever, The Metropolitan Opera Orchestra & Chorus)
  - Presentiment (Orion Weiss)
  - Strauss, R.: Der Rosenkavalier (Sebastian Weigle, Renée Fleming, Elīna Garanča, Erin Morley, Günther Groissböck, Metropolitan Opera Orchestra & Chorus)
- Elizabeth Ostrow
  - Bates: The (R)evolution of Steve Jobs (Michael Christie, Garrett Sorenson, Wei Wu, Sasha Cooke, Edwards Parks, Jessica E. Jones & Santa Fe Opera Orchestra)
  - The Road Home (Joshua Habermann & Santa Fe Desert Chorale)
- Judith Sherman
  - Beethoven Unbound (Llŷr Williams)
  - Black Manhattan Volume 3 (Rick Benjamin & Paragon Ragtime Orchestra)
  - Bolcom: Piano Music (Various artists)
  - Del Tredici: March to Tonality (Mark Peskanov & various artists)
  - Love Comes in at the Eye (Timothy Jones, Stephanie Sant'Ambrogio, Jeffrey Sykes, Anthony Ross, Carol Cook, Beth Rapier & Stephanie Jutt)
  - Meltzer: Variations on a Summer Day & Piano Quartet (Abigail Fischer, Jayce Ogren & Sequitur)
  - Mendelssohn: Complete Works for Cello and Piano (Marcy Rosen & Lydia Artymiw)
  - New Music for Violin and Piano (Julie Rosenfeld & Peter Miyamoto)
  - Reich: Pulse/Quartet (Colin Currie Group & International Contemporary Ensemble)
- Dirk Sobotka
  - Beethoven: Symphony No. 3; Strauss: Horn Concerto No. 1 (Manfred Honeck & Pittsburgh Symphony Orchestra)
  - Lippencott: Frontier Symphony (Jeff Lippencott & Ligonier Festival Orchestra)
  - Mahler: Symphony No. 8 (Thierry Fischer, Mormon Tabernacle Choir & Utah Symphony)
  - Music of the Americas (Andrés Orozco-Estrada & Houston Symphony)

=== Classical ===
Best Orchestral Performance

- **Shostakovich: Symphonies Nos. 4 & 11**
  - **Andris Nelsons, conductor (Boston Symphony Orchestra)**
- Beethoven: Symphony No. 3; Strauss: Horn Concerto No. 1
  - Manfred Honeck, conductor (Pittsburgh Symphony Orchestra)
- Nielsen: Symphony No. 3 & Symphony No. 4
  - Thomas Dausgaard, conductor (Seattle Symphony)
- Ruggles, Stucky & Harbison: Orchestral Works
  - David Alan Miller, conductor (National Orchestral Institute Philharmonic)
- Schumann: Symphonies Nos. 1-4
  - Michael Tilson Thomas, conductor (San Francisco Symphony)

Best Opera Recording

- **Bates: The (R)evolution of Steve Jobs**
  - **Michael Christie, conductor; Sasha Cooke, Jessica E. Jones, Edward Parks, Garrett Sorenson & Wei Wu; Elizabeth Ostrow, producer (The Santa Fe Opera Orchestra)**
- Adams: Doctor Atomic
  - John Adams, conductor; Aubrey Allicock, Julia Bullock, Gerald Finley & Brindley Sherratt; Friedemann Engelbrecht, producer (The BBC Symphony Orchestra; BBC Singers)
- Lully: Alceste
  - Christophe Rousset, conductor; Edwin Crossley-Mercer, Emiliano Gonzalez Toro & Judith van Wanroij; Maximilien Ciup, producer (Les Talens Lyriques; Chœur de chambre de Namur)
- Strauss, R.: Der Rosenkavalier
  - Sebastian Weigle, conductor; Renée Fleming, Elīna Garanča, Günther Groissböck & Erin Morley; David Frost, producer (Metropolitan Opera Orchestra; The Metropolitan Opera Chorus)
- Verdi: Rigoletto
  - Constantine Orbelian, conductor; Francesco Demuro, Dmitri Hvorostovsky & Nadine Sierra; Vilius Keras & Aleksandra Keriene, producers (Kaunas City Symphony Orchestra; Men of the Kaunas State Choir)

Best Choral Performance

- **McLoskey: Zealot Canticles**
  - **Donald Nally, conductor (Doris Hall-Gulati, Rebecca Harris, Arlen Hlusko, Lorenzo Raval & Mandy Wolman; The Crossing)**
- Chesnokov: Teach Me Thy Statutes
  - Vladimir Gorbik, conductor (Mikhail Davydov & Vladimir Krasov; PaTRAM Institute Male Choir)
- Kastalsky: Memory Eternal
  - Steven Fox, conductor (The Clarion Choir)
- Rachmaninov: The Bells
  - Mariss Jansons, conductor; Peter Dijkstra, chorus master (Oleg Dolgov, Alexey Markov & Tatiana Pavlovskaya; Symphonieorchester des Bayerischen Rundfunks; Chor des Bayerischen Rundfunks)
- Seven Words from the Cross
  - Matthew Guard, conductor (Skylark)

Best Chamber Music/Small Ensemble Performance

- **Anderson, Laurie: Landfall – Laurie Anderson & Kronos Quartet**
- Beethoven, Shostakovich & Bach – The Danish String Quartet
- Blueprinting – Aizuri Quartet
- Stravinsky: The Rite of Spring Concerto for Two Pianos – Leif Ove Andsnes & Marc-André Hamelin
- Visions and Variations – A Far Cry

Best Classical Instrumental Solo

- **Kernis: Violin Concerto – James Ehnes**
  - **Ludovic Morlot, conductor (Seattle Symphony)**
- Bartók: Piano Concerto No. 2 – Yuja Wang
  - Simon Rattle, conductor (Berliner Philharmoniker)
- Biber: The Mystery Sonatas – Christina Day Martinson
  - Martin Pearlman, conductor (Boston Baroque)
- Bruch: Scottish Fantasy, Op. 46; Violin Concerto No. 1 in G Minor, Op. 26
  - Joshua Bell (The Academy of St. Martin in the Fields)
- Glass: Three Pieces in the Shape of a Square
  - Craig Morris

Best Classical Solo Vocal Album

- **Songs of Orpheus: Monteverdi, Caccini, d'India & Landi – Karim Sulayman**
  - **Jeannette Sorrell, conductor; Apollo's Fire, ensembles**
- ARC – Anthony Roth Costanzo
  - Jonathan Cohen, conductor (Les Violons du Roy)
- The Handel Album – Philippe Jaroussky
  - Artaserse, ensemble
- Mirages – Sabine Devieilhe
  - François-Xavier Roth, conductor (Alexandre Tharaud; Marianne Crebassa & Jodie Devos; Les Siècles)
- Schubert: Winterreise – Randall Scarlata
  - Gilbert Kalish, accompanist

Best Classical Compendium

- **Fuchs: Piano Concerto 'Spiritualist'; Poems of Life; Glacier; Rush**
  - **JoAnn Falletta, conductor; Tim Handley, producer**
- Gold
  - The King's Singers; Nigel Short, producer
- The John Adams Edition
  - Simon Rattle, conductor; Christoph Franke, producer
- John Williams at the Movies
  - Jerry Junkin, conductor; Donald J. McKinney, producer
- Vaughan Williams: Piano Concerto; Oboe Concerto; Serenade to Music; Flos Campi
  - Peter Oundjian, conductor; Blanton Alspaugh, producer

Best Contemporary Classical Composition

- **Kernis: Violin Concerto**
  - **Aaron Jay Kernis, composer (James Ehnes, Ludovic Morlot & Seattle Symphony)**
- Bates: The (R)evolution of Steve Jobs
  - Mason Bates, composer; Mark Campbell, librettist (Michael Christie, Garrett Sorenson, Wei Wu, Sasha Cooke, Edward Parks, Jessica E. Jones & Santa Fe Opera Orchestra)
- Du Yun: Air Glow
  - Du Yun, composer (International Contemporary Ensemble)
- Heggie: Great Scott
  - Jake Heggie, composer; Terrence McNally, librettist (Patrick Summers, Manuel Palazzo, Mark Hancock, Michael Mayes, Rodell Rosel, Kevin Burdette, Anthony Roth Costanzo, Nathan Gunn, Frederica von Stade, Ailyn Pérez, Joyce DiDonato, Dallas Opera Chorus & Orchestra)
- Mazzoli: Vespers for Violin
  - Missy Mazzoli, composer (Olivia De Prato)

=== Music Video/Film ===
Best Music Video

- **"This Is America" – Childish Gambino**
  - **Hiro Murai, video directors; Ibra Ake, Jason Cole & Fam Rothstein, video producers**
- "Apeshit" – The Carters
  - Ricky Saiz, video director; Mélodie Buchris, Natan Schottenfels & Erinn Williams, video producers
- "I'm Not Racist" – Joyner Lucas
  - Joyner Lucas & Ben Proulx, video directors; Joyner Lucas, video producer
- "Pynk" – Janelle Monáe
  - Emma Westenburg, video director; Justin Benoliel & Whitney Jackson, video producers
- "Mumbo Jumbo" – Tierra Whack
  - Marco Prestini, video director; Sara Nassim, video producer

Best Music Film

- **Quincy – Quincy Jones**
  - **Alan Hicks & Rashida Jones, video directors; Paula DuPré Pesmen, video producer**
- Life in 12 Bars – Eric Clapton
  - Lili Fini Zanuck, video director; John Battsek, Scooter Weintraub, Larry Yelen & Lili Fini Zanuck, video producers
- Whitney – (Whitney Houston)
  - Kevin Macdonald, video director; Jonathan Chinn, Simon Chinn & Lisa Erspamer, video producers
- Itzhak – Itzhak Perlman
  - Alison Chernick, video director; Alison Chernick, video producer
- The King – (Elvis Presley)
  - Eugene Jarecki, video director; Christopher Frierson, Georgina Hill, David Kuhn & Christopher St. John, video producers

== Special Merit Awards ==
=== MusiCares Person of the Year ===
- Dolly Parton

=== Lifetime Achievement Award ===
- Black Sabbath
- George Clinton & Parliament-Funkadelic
- Billy Eckstine
- Donny Hathaway
- Julio Iglesias
- Sam & Dave
- Dionne Warwick

=== Trustees Award ===
- Lou Adler
- Ashford & Simpson
- Johnny Mandel

=== Technical Grammy Award ===
- Saul Walker

=== Music Educator Award ===
- Jeffery Redding (of West Orange High School in Winter Garden, Florida)

== Grammy Hall of Fame inductions ==
Title	Artist	Record label	Year of release	Genre	Format
Bernstein: Mass – A Theatre Piece for Singers, Players and Dancers	Leonard Bernstein	Columbia Masterworks	1971	Musical theatre	Album
"Coat of Many Colors"	Dolly Parton	RCA Victor	1971	Country	Single
Ella Fitzgerald Sings the George and Ira Gershwin Song Book	Ella Fitzgerald	Verve	1959	Soul	Album
Francis Albert Sinatra & Antonio Carlos Jobim	Frank Sinatra and Antonio Carlos Jobim	Reprise Records	1967	Swing	Album
Full Moon Fever	Tom Petty	MCA	1989	Rock Music	Album
"Hallelujah"	Leonard Cohen	Columbia	1984	Rock	Single
"Harper Valley P.T.A."	Jeannie C. Riley	Plantation	1968	Soul	Single
"I'm Walkin'"	Fats Domino	Imperial Records	1957	R&B/Soul	Single
Jackson Browne	Jackson Browne	Asylum	1972	Folk rock	Album
Jaco Pastorius	Jaco Pastorius	Epic	1976	Jazz fusion	Album
"Ko-Ko"	Charlie Parker's Ri Bop Boys	Savoy	1945	Jazz	Single
"La Bamba"	El Jarocho	Victor	1939	Folk	Single
"Move On Up"	Curtis Mayfield	Curtom Records	1972	Progressive soul	Single
"Pata Pata"	Miriam Makeba	Reprise	1967	R&B	Single
"Rockin' Around the Christmas Tree"	Brenda Lee	Decca	1958	Christmas	Single
'Round About Midnight	Miles Davis	Columbia	1957	Jazz	Album
"Rumble"	Link Wray & His Ray Men	Cadence	1958	Surf Rock	Single
"Smoke Gets in Your Eyes"	The Platters	Mercury	1958	Doo-wop	Single
"St. Louis Bell"	W.C. Handy	Columbia	1914	Jazz	Single
"Take Me Out to the Ball Game"	Edward Meeker with the Edison Orchestra	Edison	1908	Tin Pan Alley	Single
"Tenderly"	Sarah Vaughan	Mercury	1947	Jazz	Single
"Tenor Madness"	Sonny Rollins Quartet featuring John Coltrane	Prestige	1956	Jazz	Single
"To Be Young, Gifted and Black"	Nina Simone	RCA Victor	1969	Blues	Single
"Walk This Way"	Aerosmith	Columbia	1975	Rock	Single
"Wild Thing"	The Troggs	Fontana/Atco	1966	Garage rock	Single

== In Memoriam ==
- James Ingram
- Roy Clark
- Harold Bradley
- Freddie Hart
- Kenny O'Dell
- Bonnie Guitar
- Nancy Wilson
- Charles Aznavour
- Morgana King
- Vic Damone
- Carol Channing
- Dennis Edwards
- Barbara Alston
- Joe Jackson
- James "Big Jim" Wright
- Ray Sawyer
- Jim Rodford
- Gary Burden
- Avicii
- Alan R. Pearlman
- Marty Balin
- Ed King
- John Perry Barlow
- Tony Joe White
- Otis Rush
- Jim Malloy
- Mac Miller
- Roy Hargrove
- Cecil Taylor
- Bill Watrous
- Geoff Emerick
- David Bianco
- Russ Solomon
- Montserrat Caballé
- Katherine Hoover
- James Mallinson
- Clarence Fountain
- Yvonne Staples
- Daryle Singletary
- Lari White
- Sanger D. Shafer
- Randy Scruggs
- María Dolores Pradera
- Lucho Gatica
- Wah Wah Watson
- D.J. Fontana
- Roger Clark
- Reggie Young
- Daryl Dragon
- Dave Rowland
- Galt MacDermot
- Michel Legrand
- Patrick Williams
- Arthur B. Rubinstein
- Dan Cleary
- Jeremy Geffen
- Billy Sammeth
- Angelica Cob-Baehler
- Norman Gimbel
- Don Grierson
- Russ Regan
- Roy Wunsch
- Howell Begle
- Charles Neville
- Henry Butler
- Aretha Franklin

== Multiple nominations and awards ==
The following received multiple nominations:

Eight:

- Kendrick Lamar

Seven:

- Drake

Six:

- Boi-1da
- Brandi Carlile

Five:

- Cardi B
- Mike Bozzi
- Lady Gaga
- Childish Gambino
- H.E.R.
- Maren Morris
- Sounwave

Four:

- Dave Cobb
- Ludwig Göransson
- Greta Van Fleet
- 40
- Post Malone
- Manny Marroquin
- PJ Morton
- Kacey Musgraves
- SZA

Three:

- Beck
- Toni Braxton
- Cardo
- The Carters (Beyoncé & Jay-Z)
- John Daversa
- Alexandre Desplat
- Grey
- Phil Hanseroth
- Tim Hanseroth
- Lalah Hathaway
- Dave Kutch
- John Prine
- Jay Rock
- Mark Ronson
- Travis Scott
- Al Shux
- Chris Stapleton
- Zedd

Two:

- Christina Aguilera
- Blanton Alspaugh
- Arctic Monkeys
- Sean Ardoin
- Chris Athens
- Louis Bell
- Tony Bennett
- Big Hawk
- Brian Blade
- James Blake
- Leslie Brathwaite
- Leon Bridges
- Brothers Osborne
- Camila Cabello
- Noel Cadastre
- Noel "Gadget" Campbell
- Darhyl "Hey DJ" Camper
- Jekalyn Carr
- Chloe x Halle
- J. Cole
- Bradley Cooper
- Lauren Daigle
- DJ Mustard
- Mark Donahue
- Larrance Dopson
- Tom Elmhirst
- Tobias Forge
- David Frost
- Future
- Şerban Ghenea
- Ben Glover
- Ariana Grande
- John Hanes
- Fred Hersch
- Daveon Jackson
- Joelle James
- Shooter Jennings
- Jordan K. Johnson
- Stefan Johnson
- Tori Kelly
- Brock Korsan
- Diana Krall
- Evan LaRay
- Bettye LaVette
- Swae Lee
- Colin Leonard
- Morten Lindberg
- Dua Lipa
- Marcus Lomax
- Joyner Lucas
- Pete Lyman
- Ella Mai
- Chase McGill
- Pat McLaughlin
- Jonathan McReynolds
- Brad Mehldau
- Shawn Mendes
- Vince Mendoza
- Randy Merrill
- Miguel
- Janelle Monáe
- Willie Nelson
- Elizabeth Ostrow
- Benj Pasek
- Justin Paul
- John Powell
- Simon Rattle
- Bebe Rexha
- Anthony Rossomando
- St. Vincent
- Matt Schaeffer
- Dan Smyers
- Dirk Sobotka
- Eddie Spear
- Anthony Tiffith
- 21 Savage
- Randy Waldman
- John Williams
- Brian Courtney Wilson
- Lee Ann Womack
- Andrew Wyatt
- Miguel Zenón
- Chris Zwarg

The following received multiple awards:

Four:

- Childish Gambino
- Kacey Musgraves

Three:

- Brandi Carlile
- John Daversa
- Lady Gaga
- Ludwig Göransson

Two:

- Beck
- Lauren Daigle
- H.E.R.
- Tori Kelly
- Dua Lipa
- Mark Ronson

== Category changes ==
For the 61st Annual Grammy Awards, multiple category changes are being made;

- In the General Field (which comprises the awards for Record of the Year, Album of the Year, Song of the Year and Best New Artist), the number of nominees in each category was increased from five to eight.
- In the category of Best Compilation Soundtrack for Visual Media, music supervisors will now be eligible.
- The award for Best Surround Sound Album was renamed Best Immersive Audio Album.

== Controversy ==
On February 4, 2019, reports surfaced that American singer-songwriter Ariana Grande would not be performing at or attending the Grammys, due to a dispute with producer Ken Ehrlich. On February 7, 2019, Grande made a public statement on the matter, alleging that Ehrlich stifled her creativity and tried to stipulate what song she could perform. She then later went on and alleged that Ehrlich "lied" and she could "pull together a performance over night."

On February 11, 2019, Trinidadian-American rapper Nicki Minaj backed up Grande and alleged Ehrilch "bullied" her. Minaj later said in a statement on Twitter: "I was bullied into staying quiet for 7 years out of fear. But I'll tell my fans the REAL on the next episode of #QueenRadio they deserve the truth."
