= Amai =

Amai may refer to:

== Fictional characters ==
- Amai Odayaka, a character from Yandere Simulator
- Ao Amai, a character from A Certain Magical Index

== Other ==
- AMAI, Mexican marketing research standards agency
- Willa Amai, American folk musician
