= Wood & Wire =

Bluegrass band from Texas

- Origin: Austin, Texas
- Genres: Bluegrass
- Years active: 2011 - Present
- Label: Blue Corn Music
- Members: Tony Kamel Dominic Fisher Trevor Smith Billy Bright
- Past members: Matt Slusher
- Website: https://bluecornmusic.com/artist/wood-wire/

Wood & Wire is a bluegrass band formed in Austin, Texas in 2011. The lineup currently is made of Tony Kamel, Dominic Fisher, Trevor Smith, and Billy Bright. They are active in the Austin music scene and have played at venues like Stubb's Indoors, The Historic Scoot Inn, and Cactus Cafe. The group was nominated for their first Grammy Award for Best Bluegrass album at the 61st Grammy Awards.

== History ==
=== 2011-2017: Formation, Wood & Wire, The Coast, and Live at the Historic Scoot Inn ===
Tony Kamel (guitarist) and Matt Slusher (mandolinist) met in 2010, while they were playing with different mutual friends. Wood & Wire formed in 2011 when Dominic Fisher (bass) joined Slusher and Kamel's jam sessions. They started as a trio. Later that same year they added Trevor Smith on banjo, becoming a quartet. They toured in early 2013 with Yonder Mountain String Band and released their self-titled album Wood & Wire on February 5, 2013. The album is compiled of songs that the members wrote individually then rearranged as a band, as well as songs they wrote together. Brittany Haas plays on the record. They recorded the album in Nashville, alongside producer and sound engineer Erick Jaskowiak after being recommended by friend, Carl Miner, guitar player for The Greencards. Kamel said of Erick, "he did the perfect amount of production advice and he wasn't try to change what we were doing. We all hit it off really well."

At the time of recording their second album, The Coast, the members in the band were Kamel, Fisher, and Smith. The album was released on February 3, 2015. Jason Carter and Andy Leftwich played fiddle. They collaborated with Erick Jaskowiak in Nashville again. All of the tracks on the album were written collaboratively between band members.

In 2014, they added Billy Bright on mandolin. Billy has known Smith since 2007 when they were in different bands touring together, Kamel since 2009 because he was giving him mandolin lessons, and Fisher because he was played Bass on album Billy was producing.

On April 8, 2016, they released their first live album Live at the Historic Scoot Inn.

=== 2018-present: North of Despair, Grammy Nomination, and No Matter Where It Goes From Here ===
They recorded their 3rd studio album, North of Despair, at The Zone in Dripping Springs, Texas. They cut the tracks to mostly live tape, with little editing. This is their first album with Billy Bright added to the lineup. This is also their first album to be released by the local Austin record label, Blue Corn Music. They released the music video for Just Don't Make 'Em on March 21, 2018; the video was shot at Austin's Graffiti Park and around town. The song is about Kamel's grandfather and their piece of family property in Llano. The band was inspired after seeing Willie Nelson perform at his ranch in Luck, Texas, and they created Kingpin as a "traveling tune." They made a music video for the song from video footage from a show at one of their favorite Austin music venues, Mohawk. North of Despair was released on April 13, 2018. It earned them their first Grammy Award Nomination for the 2019 61st Grammy Award ceremony for Best Bluegrass Album. The same day of their nomination, they were also awarded a $20,000 at the Black Fret Ball.

The production process of their 4th album was being wrapped up at the end of February 2020, they were “pretty much done with it.” The album was recorded at The Zone in Dripping Springs, Texas. They decided to wait to release the album due to the COVID-19 pandemic and decided to release it on August 28, 2020. Like their last album, it was released through Blue Corn Music. The lead single, called Pigs, was released on July 9, 2020. The track is “social commentary for sure — mostly around money. Money, divisive profit-driven news cycles, profits over people, constant consumption and waste — you know all of those uplifting modern hypocrisies.” They had to scrap plans to make videos and they reached out to their friend, Danny Barnes, who draws comics to draw some pictures. And Kamel started to make a video with lyrics around the pictures and added basic animation to it.

== Band Members ==
=== Current members ===
- Tony Kamel - Vocals, Guitar (2011–present)
- Dominic Fisher - Bass (2011–present)
- Trevor Smith - Banjo (2011–present)
- Billy Bright - Mandolin (2014–present)

=== Former members ===
- Matt Slusher - Mandolin (2011-2013)

== Discography ==
=== Studio albums ===
Title	Details
Wood & Wire	Released: February 5th, 2013; Label: Self-released
The Coast	Released: February 3rd, 2015; Label: Self-released
North of Despair	Released: April 13th, 2018; Label: Blue Corn Music
No Matter Where It Goes From Here	Released: August 28th, 2020; Label: Blue Corn Music

=== Live albums ===
Title	Details
Live at the Historic Scoot Inn	Released: April 8th, 2016; Label: Self-released
