= Andrew Donoho =

American music video director

- Born: U.S.
- Occupations: Music video director, Visual Effects, Editor
- Years active: 2011–present

Andrew Donoho is an American music video director.

== Career ==
Donoho is a member of the Directors Guild of America. He has directed music videos for Twenty One Pilots, Bella Poarch, Lil Nas X, Sub Urban, Ava Max, Imagine Dragons, Janelle Monáe and The Strokes.

== Select filmography ==
Year	Title	Contribution	Note
2018	Dirty Computer	Co-director	Feature film

=== Selected music videos ===
Year	Title	Artist/Band	Roles
2015	"Sorry"	Meg Myers	Director
2015	"Devil's Whisper"	Raury	Director
2015	"Weathered"	Jack Garratt	Director
2015	"Stranger"	Skrillex	Director
2016	"A Wonderful Life"	Brian Fallon	Director
2016	"Heathens"	Twenty One Pilots	Director
2016	"No Money"	Galantis	Director
2016	"Ritual"	Marshmello	Director
2017	"Heavydirtysoul"	Twenty One Pilots	Director
2017	"Free"	6lack	Director
2017	"Flame"	Tinashe	Director
2017	"Chase Me"	Danger Mouse	Director
2017	"Get Low"	Zedd and Liam Payne	Director
2018	"Starlight"	Jai Wolf	Director
2018	"Django Jane"	Janelle Monáe	Director
2018	"Guess Again"	Plan B	Director
2018	"Jumpsuit"	Twenty One Pilots	Director
2018	"Nico and the Niners"	Twenty One Pilots	Director
2018	"Levitate"	Twenty One Pilots	Director
2018	"Better"	Khalid	Director
2019	"I've Been Waiting"	Lil Peep	Director
2019	"The Hype"	Twenty One Pilots	Director
2019	"Manifest"	Starset	Director
2019	"Want You in My Room"	Carly Rae Jepsen	Director
2019	"Cradles"	Sub Urban	Director
2020	"Bad Decisions"	The Strokes	Director
2020	"Freak"	Sub Urban	Director
2020	"Gimme Love"	Joji	Director
2021	"Bed Head"	Manchester Orchestra	Director
2021	"Glock in My Lap"	21 Savage	Director
2021	"Cirque"	Sub Urban	Director
2021	"Patchwerk"	Sub Urban	Director
2021	"Build a Bitch"	Bella Poarch	Director
2021	"Saturday"	Twenty One Pilots	Director
2021	"Find My Way"	Paul McCartney	Director
2021	"Inferno"	Sub Urban	Director
2022	"Anyone for You (Tiger Lily)"	George Ezra	Director
2022	"I'll Never Not Love You"	Michael Bublé	Director
2022	"The Outside"	Twenty One Pilots	Director
2022	"Uh Oh"	Sub Urban	Director
2022	"Dolls"	Bella Poarch	Director
2022	"Living Hell"	Bella Poarch	Director
2022	"Million Dollar Baby"	Ava Max	Director
2023	"Toretto"	J Balvin	Director
2023	"Hell is a Teenage Girl"	Nessa Barrett	Director
2023	"Let's Go"	Will.i.am and J Balvin	Director
2024	"Next Semester"	Twenty One Pilots	Director
2024	"Eyes Closed"	Imagine Dragons	Director
2024	"Psychic"	LAY	Director
2024	"Light Again!"	Lil Nas X	Director
2024	"Somebody Else's"	Gwen Stefani	Director
2024	"The Line"	Twenty One Pilots	Director
2025	"Fear"	NF	Director
2025	"Searchlight"	Shinedown	Director
2026	"Young Again"	Shinedown	Director

== Awards and nominations ==
Year	Result	Award	Category	Work	Ref.
2016	Won	MTV Video Music Awards	Best Rock Video	Twenty One Pilots — "Heathens"	
2017	Won	MTV Video Music Awards	Best Rock Video	Twenty One Pilots — "Heavydirtysoul"	
2019	Nominated	Hugo Award	Best Dramatic Presentation	Dirty Computer	
2020	Nominated	Berlin Music Video Awards	Best Director	Sub Urban — "Cradles"	
2020	Nominated	UK Music Video Awards	Best Rock Video - International	The Strokes - "Bad Decisions"	
2021	Nominated	UK Music Video Awards	Best Alternative Video - UK	Paul McCartney featuring Beck – "Find My Way"	
2021	Nominated	UK Music Video Awards	Best Pop Video - International	Bella Poarch – "Build a Bitch"	
2021	Nominated	MTV Video Music Awards	Best Visual Effects	Bella Poarch – "Build a Bitch"	
