= Laid Black =

Studio album by Marcus Miller
- Released: June 1, 2018
- Studios: Bailey Music Studio (Las Vegas, Nevada); Buckjump Studios (New Orleans, Louisiana); Dockside Studios (Lafayette, Louisiana); Golson Studios (Philadelphia, Pennsylvania); Hannibal Studios (Santa Monica, California); Jonathan Butler Studio (Calabasas, California); The Village (Los Angeles, California); Cane River Studios (Sherman Oaks, California); Lofi Studio (Boston, Massachusetts); Sear Sound (New York City, New York); Synergy Studios (Seattle, Washington)
- Genres: Hip hop; jazz; funk; soul
- Length: 53:56
- Label: Blue Note
- Producer: Marcus Miller

Marcus Miller chronology
Afrodeezia (2015)	Laid Black (2018)

Professional ratings
Review scores
Source	Rating
DownBeat	3/5 stars
Financial Times	4/5 stars
Jazz Forum	5/5 stars
Jazzwise	3/5 stars
laut.de	4/5 stars

Laid Black is a studio album by American recording artist Marcus Miller. It was released on June 1, 2018 by Blue Note Records. Laid Black was nominated for Best Contemporary Instrumental Album at the 61st Annual Grammy Awards. The album features collaborations with Trombone Shorty, Jonathan Butler, Take 6, Selah Sue, Kirk Whalum & Alex Han.

The track "Keep 'Em Runnin" is based on "Runnin" from Earth, Wind & Fire's 1977 album "All 'n All". Miller's arrangement plays the original melody over a half-tempo hip hop beat and adds a rap.

== Reception ==
Michelle Mercer of DownBeat wrote, "There’s no judging an album by its cover. But the cover of Marcus Miller’s Laid Black is a litmus test: The title’s pun, the image of a shirtless Miller gazing with soulful directness and the musician’s reputation itself will divide most listeners into believers and doubters before they’ve even heard the first bass slap." Dan Bilawski of JazzTimes stated, "In liberally mixing aspects of R&B, trap, funk, and hip-hop with jazz, Miller manages to play up their commonalities while leveraging the originality and accessibility of each."

== Track listing ==
All songs written by Marcus Miller, except where noted.

No.	Title	Writer(s)	Length
1.	"Trip Trap"		6:59
2.	"Que Sera, Sera"	Ray Evans, Jay Livingston	6:04
3.	"7-T's"	Alex Blake, Marcus Miller	5:56
4.	"Sublimity"	Alex Han, Brett Williams, Marcus Miller	6:44
5.	"Untamed"	Charles Haynes, Mitch Henry, Brett Williams, Marcus Miller	4:48
6.	"No Limit"		5:36
7.	"Someone To Love"		4:42
8.	"Keep 'Em Running"	Eddie Del Barrio, Larry Dunn, Maurice White, Marcus Miller	5:19
9.	"Preacher's Kid"		7:43
Total length:			53:51

== Personnel ==
- Marcus Miller – vocals (1, 3, 7, 8), keyboards (1, 7), synthesizers (1, 2, 5, 6, 8), bass (1–6, 8), drum and rhythm programming (1, 6), Wurlitzer electric piano (2), organ (2), clavinet (2), rhythm guitar (2), alto saxophone (2), backing vocals (2), guitars (3), bass clarinet (4, 9), low brass arrangements (4), acoustic piano solo (5), fretless bass (5, 7), percussion (7)
- Brett Williams – keyboards (1, 3, 5, 9), acoustic piano (4, 6), Fender Rhodes (4, 6, 8), synthesizers (4), organ (4), acoustic piano solo (5), keyboard bass (9)
- Mitch Henry – keyboards (5)
- Caleb McCampbell – vocoder (6)
- Cliff Barnes – acoustic piano (7)
- Adam Agati – guitar solo (2), guitars (7)
- Jonathan Butler – acoustic guitar (4), vocals (4)
- Alex Bailey – drums (1, 2, 9), percussion (3, 4)
- Louis Cato – drums (3, 4, 6–8), vocals (8)
- Charles Haynes – drums (5), programming (5)
- Richie Gajate-Garcia – percussion (8)
- Alex Han – alto saxophone (1–4, 6–9)
- Kirk Whalum – flute (5), tenor sax solo (8), tenor saxophone (9)
- Trombone Shorty – trombone solo (3)
- Brian Culbertson – trombone (8)
- Marquis Hill – trumpet (1, 3, 4, 6,,8)
- Michael "Patches" Stewart – trumpet (2, 5, 8)
- Russell Gunn – New Orleans horns in end section arrangements (1), trumpet (9)
- Selah Sue – vocals (2)
- Peculiar 3 – vocals (5)
- Honey Larochelle – vocals (8)
- Julian Miler – vocals (8)
- Take 6 – vocals (9)

=== Production ===
- Harold Goode – executive producer, associate producer
- Marcus Miller – producer, arrangements
- Harry Martin Jr. – associate producer
- Brenda Miller – co-producer, project coordinator
- Bibi Green – music contractor, artist management
- Bernard Dulau – artist management
- Lex Sadler – art direction, design, layout
- Andrew Dunn – cover photography
- Cathrin Cammett – back cover photography

=== Technical credits ===
- Ron Boustead – mastering at Resolution Mastering (Sherman Oaks, California)
- Chris Allen – engineer (1–4, 6, 8)
- Aleks Edmonds – engineer (1–4, 6, 8)
- Julian Miller – engineer (1–4, 6, 8)
- Marcus Miller – engineer (1–4, 6, 8)
- Jason Shavey – engineer (1–4, 6, 8)
- David Rideau – mixing (1–4, 6–9)
- Jan de Ryck – lead vocal engineer (2)
- Feri Bong – engineer (5), mixing (5)
- Colin Fleming – engineer (5)
- Charles Haynes – engineer (5), mixing (5)
- Justin Tocket – engineer (7)
- Jeff Gartenbaum – engineer (9)
- Charles Smith – additional engineer (3)
- Xian You Ong – assistant engineer (5)
- Karl Wingate – assistant engineer (9)
