= Afrodeezia =

Studio album by Marcus Miller
- Released: March 16, 2015
- Studio: 1172 Bounce (North Brunswick, New Jersey); Jankland Recording Studios (New Jersey); Audible Images (Pittsburgh, Pennsylvania); GBP Studios (East Landing, Missouri); Grand Street Recording (Brooklyn, New York); Queens Studios (Queens, New York); Jack Of All Studios (Quincy, Massachusetts); Rustic Space (Portland, Maine); La Louisianne Recording Studios (Layfaette, Louisiana); Hannibal Studios (Santa Monica, California); The Village Recorder and The Audio Labs (Los Angeles, California); The Dormitory (South Pasadena, California); The Lodge (North Hollywood, California); Apollo 32 (South Gate, California); Cane River Studios (Sherman Oaks, California); Riomar Studios (Rio de Janeiro, Brazil); Essouria (Moracco); Festival Gnaoua at Musique de Monde; Point G Studios (Paris, France)
- Genre: Jazz
- Length: 65:02
- Label: Blue Note
- Producer: Marcus Miller

Marcus Miller chronology
Renaissance (2012)	Afrodeezia (2015)	Laid Black (2018)

Professional ratings
Review scores
Source	Rating
All About Jazz	5/5 stars
AllMusic	4.5/5 stars
The Guardian	3/5 stars
Financial Times	3/5 stars
Jazz Forum	5/5 stars
Jazzwise	4/5 stars
PopMatters	8/10
Tom Hull	B+

Afrodeezia is a studio album by American bass-guitarist Marcus Miller. The album was released on March 16, 2015 by Blue Note Records. This is his debut release for Blue Note.

== Reception ==
Jeff Tamarkin in his review for JazzTimes stated, "For Afrodeezia, Marcus Miller—who mentions in his liner notes that he’s a spokesperson for UNESCO’s "Slave Route Project"—chose to incorporate musicians and instrumentation associated with various locales historically impacted by slavery. It's a formidably funky collection-no surprise there-and some of Miller's most ambitious work." John Fordham of The Guardian wrote, "Despite the seriousness of his subject, the versatile Miller’s work never altogether shakes off an air of expert slickness, but some strong themes and plenty of urgent improvising more or less neutralise that." Walter Atkins of All About Jazz commented, "Marcus Miller's ambitious continent spanning Afrodeezia follows the Atlantic slave trade routes and celebrates the historical struggles and triumph of the African people and their descendents through the healing power of music. He affirms how vital the music and rhythms are in our lives and the global community."

== Track listing ==
No.	Title	Writer(s)	Length
1.	"Hylife"	Marcus Miller, Mamadou Cherif Soumano, Alune Wade	6:59
2.	"B's River"	Marcus Miller	6:49
3.	"Preacher's Kid (Song for William H)"	Marcus Miller, Alune Wade	5:46
4.	"We Were There"	Djavan, Marcus Miller	6:49
5.	"Papa Was a Rolling Stone"	Barrett Strong, Norman Whitfield	6:07
6.	"I Still Believe I Hear (Je Crois Entendre Encore)"	Georges Bizet	7:06
7.	"Son of Macbeth"	Marcus Miller	6:12
8.	"Prism (Interlude)"	Adam Agati, Louis Cato, Alex Han, Lee Hogans, Marcus Miller, Brett Williams	0:30
9.	"Xtraordinary"	Marcus Miller	6:14
10.	"Water Dancer"	Marcus Miller	7:28
11.	"I Can't Breathe"	Adam Dornblum, Marcus Miller, Carlton Ridenhour	5:09
Total length:			1:05:02

== Personnel ==
- Marcus Miller – bass guitar (1, 2, 4–8, 10, 11), party vocal (1), gimbri (2, 11), bass clarinet (2, 3, 9, 11), acoustic piano (3, 9), acoustic bass (3), horn arrangements (3), arrangements (5, 6), fretless bass (6, 9), vocals (9), kalimba (9), Fender Rhodes (11), synthesizers (11)
- Brett Williams – acoustic piano (1, 2, 4, 6, 7), Fender Rhodes (4, 8)
- Cory Henry – organ solo (3)
- Robert Glasper – Fender Rhodes solo (4)
- Cliff Barnes – acoustic piano (5, 10), organ (5)
- Roddie Romero – accordion (10)
- Mocean Worker – Fender Rhodes (11), guitars (11), bass guitar breakdown (11), drum programming (11)
- Adam Agati – guitars (1, 4–8, 10), electric guitar (2), guitar solo (7)
- Chérif Soumano – acoustic guitar (1), vocal chorus (1), backing vocals (1), kora (2, 10)
- Guimba Kouyaté – lead vocals (1), acoustic guitar (2, 10)
- Keb Mo – guitar (5)
- Wah Wah Watson – wah-wah guitar (5)
- Louis Cato – drums (1–3, 5–7, 9, 10), vocal fills (1), alto saxophone (4), djembe (6), drum machine (8)
- Adama Bilorou Dembele – percussion (1, 2, 10), backing vocals (1)
- Marco Lobo – percussion (4)
- Munyungo Jackson – African percussion (5)
- Lamumba Henry – percussion (6), djembe (9)
- Robert Greenidge – steelpans (7)
- Alex Han – alto saxophone (1, 2, 5, 7–10), soprano saxophone (6)
- Lee Hogans – trumpet (1, 4, 6, 8, 9)
- Etienne Charles – trumpet (2, 7), percussion (7)
- Michael "Patches" Stewart – trumpet (5)
- Ambrose Akinmusire – trumpet (10)
- Ben Hong – cello (6)
- Michael Doucet – violin (10)
- Alune Wade – vocal chorus (1), backing vocals (1), choir vocals (3), musical suggestions (10)
- Lalah Hathaway – vocals (3), scat vocals (4)
- Alvin Chea – choir vocals (3)
- Julia Sarr – choir vocals (3)
- Alina Cabral – backing vocals (4)
- Andrea Dutra – backing vocals (4)
- Kika Tristão – backing vocals (4)
- Chuck D – rap (11)

=== Production ===
- Don Was – A&R
- Nicolas Pflug – A&R
- Harold Goode – executive producer, associate producer
- Harry Martin – executive producer
- Marcus Miller – producer
- Bibi Green – project coordinator, artist management
- Bernard Dulau – artist management
- Rebecca Meek – package design
- Cathrin Cammet – photography
- Taka Honda – management

=== Technical credits ===
- Louie Teran – mastering at Marcussen Mastering (Hollywood, California)
- Taka Honda – mixing (1, 7, 10), recording, engineer
- David Rideau – mixing (2, 6, 9)
- David Isaac – mixing (3–5)
- Marcus Blackberry – mixing (8)
- James Saez – mixing (11)
- Glenn Brown – recording
- Serge Glansberg – recording
- Hollis Greathouse – recording
- JP Hesser – recording
- Ken Rich – recording
- John Roods – recording
- Justin Tocket – recording
- Guian Wright – recording
- Pierce Bossley – assistant engineer
- Kevin de Longeril – assistant engineer
- Gustavo Essinger – assistant engineer
- Carlos Louerio – assistant engineer
- Paul Quantin – assistant engineer
