= Dirty Computer =

Studio album by Janelle Monáe
- Released: April 27, 2018
- Recorded: 2015–2018
- Studios: Wondaland (Atlanta, Georgia); Chalice (Los Angeles); Atlantic (New York City); Shawty Ra (Los Angeles); Stankonia (Atlanta, Georgia)
- Genres: Pop; funk; hip-hop; R&B; neo soul
- Length: 48:47
- Labels: Wondaland; Bad Boy; Atlantic
- Producers: Janelle Monáe; Nate Wonder; Chuck Lightning; Nana Kwabena; Roman GianArthur; Wynne Bennett; Jon Brion; Mattman & Robin

Janelle Monáe chronology
Wondaland Presents: The Eephus (2015)	Dirty Computer (2018)	The Age of Pleasure (2023)

Singles from Dirty Computer
- 1. "Make Me Feel" Released: February 22, 2018; 2. "Django Jane" Released: February 22, 2018; 3. "Pynk" Released: April 10, 2018; 4. "I Like That" Released: August 17, 2018

Dirty Computer is the third studio album by American singer and songwriter Janelle Monáe, released on April 27, 2018, by Wondaland Arts Society, Bad Boy Records and Atlantic Records. It is the follow-up to her studio albums The ArchAndroid (2010) and The Electric Lady (2013) and her first album not to continue the Cindi Mayweather Metropolis narrative.

A departure from the more psychedelic sound of her early work, Dirty Computer is a pop, funk, hip-hop, R&B, and neo soul record, featuring elements of electropop, space rock, pop rock, Minneapolis soul, trap, futurepop, new wave, synthpop, and Latin music. Four singles, "Make Me Feel", "Django Jane", "Pynk", and "I Like That", were chosen to promote the album. Its release was accompanied by a 46-minute narrative film project of the same name.

The album received universal critical acclaim upon release; it was included in the top three of seven publications' Best Album of 2018 lists, and received two nominations at the 61st Annual Grammy Awards, including Album of the Year. It debuted at number six on the Billboard 200 and was further promoted by Monáe's Dirty Computer Tour.

== Background and recording ==
In October 2016, Monáe made her feature-length film acting debut in Moonlight, alongside Naomie Harris, André Holland, and Mahershala Ali. Monáe also starred in the film Hidden Figures, alongside actresses Taraji P. Henson and Octavia Spencer; the film was released in December 2016. While filming her two movie roles, Monáe remained active in music with features on Grimes' "Venus Fly" from her Art Angels album and also the soundtrack for the Netflix series The Get Down with a song titled, "Hum Along and Dance (Gotta Get Down)". She was also on the tracks "Isn't This the World" and "Jalapeño" for the Hidden Figures soundtrack. In an interview with People, Monáe revealed that she was already working on her third studio album when she received the scripts for her two first acting roles; therefore, she put the album on hold. She also revealed in the interview that she would be releasing new music sometime in 2017, although by the end of the year no album or single was announced.

It was confirmed by Monáe after "Make Me Feel" was released that Prince, with whom she collaborated on her preceding album, had worked on the single, as well as the entire album, before his death in 2016. This was confirmed after listeners noticed similarities between the single's sound and the late musician's work. Monáe stated in an interview with BBC Radio 1: "Prince was actually working on the album with me before he passed on to another frequency, and helped me come up with some sounds. And I really miss him, you know, it’s hard for me to talk about him. But I do miss him, and his spirit will never leave me." The synth groove in "Make Me Feel", reported to be written by Prince, was played at one of his parties years prior to its inclusion in the single, as confirmed by Prince's DJ, Lenka Paris.

Monáe had been exploring the themes presented in Dirty Computer for a decade before its production, but noted that "earlier it felt safer to package herself in metaphors...The sanitized android version felt more accepted — and more acceptable — than her true self. The public, she explained, doesn't really 'know Janelle Monáe, and I felt like I didn't really have to be her because they were fine with Cindi.'" Monáe considers Dirty Computer to be "a homage to women and the spectrum of sexual identities." The album's 14 tracks can be grouped into three loose categories: "Reckoning", "Celebration" and "Reclamation". The first deals with Monáe's recognition of how she is viewed by society, the middle explores her acceptance of "the cards she has been dealt", and the closing tracks deal with her reclamation and redefinition of American identity. Overall, the album is Monáe's attempt to "step into a more authentic self".

== Release and promotion ==
On February 16, 2018, Monáe revealed her third studio album and the accompanying narrative film, entitled Dirty Computer, through a teaser video released on YouTube. The teaser video aired nationwide in select theaters prior to screenings of Black Panther. Monáe held a series of "top-secret" listening sessions in Los Angeles and New York City prior to the album announcement.

The album was released on April 27, 2018.

It was supported with the simultaneous release of a 46-minute short film of the same name, dubbed an "emotion picture" by Monáe. It follows Monáe's character, Jane 57821, as she attempts to break free from the constraints of "a totalitarian society [that] forcibly makes Jane comply with its homophobic beliefs... In the film, Monáe's character is trying to assert her individuality, which makes her the enemy of a soulless regime – a common tension in dystopian sci-fi." Actress Tessa Thompson and actor Jayson Aaron co-star as Zen and Ché respectively, lovers with whom Jane escapes "the clutches of this repressive society." The film features little dialogue outside of the overlay of the album's songs that function as the narrative's main driving force. Tim Grierson of Rolling Stone described that, in the film, "Monáe plays with the conventions and totems of dystopian sci-fi to speak her truth and promote a cultural shift toward a more inclusive and loving society – no matter what repressive government (whether real or fictional) is trying to crush that spirit. Monáe is speaking to the present, but for her, the future is now."

On February 1, 2019, Monáe released a new director's cut of the Dirty Computer emotion picture with 13 extra minutes of bonus interviews from the cast and crew.

== Singles ==
On February 23, 2018, Monáe released "Make Me Feel" and "Django Jane", the first two singles from Dirty Computer. On April 11, the album's third single "Pynk", featuring Canadian musician Grimes, was released. "I Like That" was released on April 23 as a promotional single, but soon after in August, was made to be the final official single from the album. Three remix singles were released for the song on August 17, August 24, and November 9, 2018.

Standalone music videos were also released for "Crazy, Classic, Life" and "Screwed" on December 12, 2018, and January 7, 2019, respectively.

== Critical reception ==
Professional ratings
Aggregate scores
Source	Rating
AnyDecentMusic?	8.4/10
Metacritic	87/100
Review scores
Source	Rating
AllMusic	4.5/5 stars
The A.V. Club	A
The Daily Telegraph	5/5 stars
Entertainment Weekly	A−
The Guardian	3/5 stars
The Independent	5/5 stars
NME	5/5 stars
Pitchfork	7.7/10
Rolling Stone	4.5/5 stars
Vice (Expert Witness)	A−

Dirty Computer received widespread acclaim from music critics. At Metacritic, which assigns a normalized rating out of 100 to reviews from mainstream critics, the album has an average score of 87 based on 33 reviews, indicating "universal acclaim". At AnyDecentMusic?, which gives a formulated rating on a ten-point scale, the album has an aggregate score of 8.4 based on 32 reviews.

Reviewing the album for AllMusic, Andy Kellman said that "While this is easily the most loaded Monáe album in terms of guests, with Brian Wilson, Stevie Wonder, and Grimes among the contributors, there's no doubt that it's a Wondaland product. It demonstrates that artful resistance and pop music are not mutually exclusive." Neil McCormick for The Daily Telegraph called Dirty Computer "unblushingly and unsparingly direct...[It] establishes itself as a contender for album of the year, in more ways than one... [Monáe]'s layered sound is as contemporary as that of such digital trailblazers as Kendrick Lamar or Kanye West, yet it has an old-fashioned organic quality that comes from a bedrock of live musicianship. Dirty Computer sounds like 2018 distilled into a sci-fi funk pop extravaganza by a female Black Panther." The Independent reviewer Roisin O'Connor stated that Dirty Computer is "a record that will go down as a milestone not just as a work of art in its own right, but as the perfect celebration of queerness, female power, and self-worth." Danette Chavez of The A.V. Club described that, on Dirty Computer, "the erstwhile 'Electric Lady' loses the metal and circuitry, but none of her power or artistry, cementing her status alongside Prince in the hall of hyper-talented, gender-fluid icons who love and promote blackness."

Josh Hurst for Flood Magazine wrote that "Every generation needs its own soundtrack for kicking against the pricks, and Monáe delivers one—easily the most pop-conversant, hook-laden, and propulsive music of her career." Robert Christgau, who in the past had found Monáe's voice too thin and her songwriting overly intellectual, was converted by Dirty Computer's Prince-inspired, sex-positive songs: "Too often prosex albums are shallow. While remaining intellectual, this one is more personal than the android dared."

In a less enthusiastic review, Alexis Petridis of The Guardian suggested that "You occasionally wonder if an understandable desire to cross over commercially might not be at the root of the album's less inspired moments: there's something commonplace and risk-averse about the pop-R&B backing of 'Crazy, Classic, Life' and 'I Got the Juice'... It's hard not to wonder if her failure to connect with a mass audience might be because her desire to work with concepts and characters, rather than unburden herself, suggests a certain aloofness... She is as elusive as ever, and her mystery remains intact. Without a true loosening of her poise, her position on the margins of pop could remain intact as well." Zachary Hoskins from Slant Magazine declared that "while the songs here are consistently hooky, they lack the earlier albums' sonic adventurousness... While Monáe's heart is in the right place, her lyrics occasionally suffer from the clumsiness endemic to politicized pop... If Dirty Computer feels somewhat blunter and less ambitious than Monáe's earlier work, though, it's also her most immediately satisfying."

=== Accolades ===
The album was nominated for Album of the Year and the music video for "Pynk" was nominated for Best Music Video at the 61st Grammy Awards. The associated narrative film was a finalist for the 2019 Hugo Awards for Best Dramatic Presentation – Short Form.

Year- and decade-end lists
Publication	Accolade	Rank
The Associated Press	AP's Top 2018 Albums	1
Complex	The Best Albums of 2018	13
Consequence of Sound	The Top 50 Albums of 2018	2
Consequence of Sound	The 100 Top Albums of the 2010s	14
Consumer Guide	2018 Dean's List	21
Entertainment Weekly	The 20 Best Albums of 2018	9
Flavorwire	The 25 Best Albums of 2018	13
The Guardian	The Best Albums of 2018	3
Independent	Albums of the Year 2018	3
The New York Times (Jon Pareles)	The 28 Best Albums of 2018	1
NPR	The 50 Best Albums of 2018	1
Paste	The 50 Best Albums of 2018	14
The Ringer	The Best Albums of 2018	5
Rolling Stone	50 Best Albums of 2018	13
The Skinny	Albums of 2018	7
Stereogum	The 50 Best Albums of 2018	38
Time	The 10 Best Albums of 2018	2
UNCUT	75 Best Albums of 2018	6
Uproxx	The 50 Best Albums of 2018	4

== Commercial performance ==
Dirty Computer debuted at number six on the US Billboard 200, opening with 54,000 album-equivalent units in its first week, with 41,000 coming from pure sales, making it the artist's highest first week sales and second highest-charting album, behind The Electric Lady (2013).

== Track listing ==
Credits adapted from the album's liner notes

Dirty Computer
No.	Title	Writer(s)	Producer(s)	Length
1.	"Dirty Computer" (featuring Brian Wilson)	Janelle Monáe Robinson; Nathaniel Irvin III	Nate Wonder; Janelle Monáe^{[a]}; Chuck Lightning^{[a]}	1:59
2.	"Crazy, Classic, Life"	Robinson; N. Irvin; Charles Joseph II	Wonder; Monáe^{[a]}; Lightning^{[a]}	4:46
3.	"Take a Byte"	Robinson; N. Irvin; John M. Webb, Jr.; Nana Kwabena Tuffuor	Wonder; Monáe^{[a]}; Lightning^{[a]}; Jon Jon Traxx^{[a]}; Nana Kwabena^{[b]}	4:07
4.	"Jane's Dream"	Jon Brion	Brion	0:18
5.	"Screwed" (featuring Zoë Kravitz)	Robinson; N. Irvin; Joseph; Roman GianArthur Irvin; Benjamin Hudson Mcildowie	Wonder; Monáe^{[a]}; Lightning^{[a]}; Roman GianArthur^{[a]}	5:02
6.	"Django Jane"	Robinson; N. Irvin; Tuffuor	Wonder^{[a]}; Kwabena	3:10
7.	"Pynk" (featuring Grimes)	Robinson; N. Irvin; Joseph; Taylor Parks; Wynne Bennett	Wonder; Monáe^{[a]}; Lightning; Bennett	4:00
8.	"Make Me Feel"	Robinson; Mattias Larsson; Robin Fredriksson; Justin Tranter; Julia Michaels	Mattman & Robin	3:14
9.	"I Got the Juice" (featuring Pharrell Williams)	Robinson; N. Irvin; Parks; R. Irvin; Tuffuor; Pharrell Williams; Joshua Dean	Wonder; Monáe^{[b]}; Lightning^{[b]}; Kwabena^{[a]}	3:46
10.	"I Like That"	Robinson; N. Irvin; Parks; Ray Murray; Rico Wade; Patrick L. Brown	Wonder^{[b]}; Monáe^{[c]}; Lightning^{[c]}; Organized Noize	3:20
11.	"Don't Judge Me"	Robinson; N. Irvin; Parks; R. Irvin; Dean	Wonder; Monáe^{[b]}; GianArthur^{[b]}	6:00
12.	"Stevie's Dream"	R. Irvin; N. Irvin	Wonder; Monáe; GianArthur	0:46
13.	"So Afraid"	Robinson; N. Irvin	Wonder; Monáe^{[a]}	4:04
14.	"Americans"	Robinson; N. Irvin; Webb; Joseph	Wonder; Monáe^{[a]}; Lightning^{[a]}; Traxx^{[b]}	4:06
Total length:				48:47

Notes

- ^{^[a]} signifies a co-producer
- ^{^[b]} signifies an additional producer
- ^{^[c]} signifies an additional vocal producer

Sample credits

- "Django Jane" contains a sample from "A Dream", written and performed by David Axelrod.
- "Pynk" contains a sample from "Pink", written by Glen Ballard, Richard Supa and Steven Tyler.

== Personnel ==
Musicians

- Janelle Monáe – lead vocals (tracks 1–3, 5–11, 13, 14), background vocals (track 6)
- Zoë Kravitz – lead vocals (track 5)
- Pharrell Williams – lead vocals (track 9)
- Nate "Rocket" Wonder – background vocals (tracks 9, 10, 13), synthesizer (tracks 1–3, 5, 6, 9, 11, 13, 14), drums (tracks 1–3, 5–7, 9–11, 13, 14), programming (tracks 1–3, 5, 6, 11, 13, 14), guitar (tracks 1–3, 5–7, 9–11, 13, 14), bass (tracks 1–3, 5, 6, 10, 11), piano (tracks 7, 10)
- Brian Wilson – background vocals (tracks 1, 3)
- The Skunks – background vocals (tracks 9, 10)
- Matt Jardine – background vocals (track 1)
- Grimes – background vocals (track 7)
- Wynne Bennett – background vocals (track 6), synthesizer (track 7), drums (track 7), guitar (track 7)
- Nana Kwabena – background vocals (track 9), synthesizer (tracks 3, 6), drums (track 3), programming (tracks 6, 9)
- Sleepy Brown – background vocals (track 10)
- Todd Bergman – background vocals (track 10)
- Roman GianArthur – background vocals (track 11), drums (track 5), guitar (tracks 5, 9, 10)
- Isis Valentino – background vocals (track 11)
- Reverend Sean McMillan – "love sermon" (tracks 2, 14)
- Stevie Wonder – "oratory blessings" (track 12)
- Jon Brion – synthesizer (tracks 1–5, 13), mallets (track 1)
- Jon Jon Traxx – programming (track 14), guitar (tracks 3, 14), bass (tracks 1–3, 5, 11, 14), percussion (track 13)
- Kellindo – guitar (tracks 1–3, 5–7, 9, 13, 14)
- The Wondaland ArchOrchestra (tracks 1, 11)
  - Alexander Page – violins
  - Grace Shim – cello
- Sounwave – additional drums (track 1)
- Thundercat – bass (track 3)
- Dennis Hamm – piano (track 3)
- Andrew Horowitz – synthesizer (track 9)
- Organized Noize – additional instrumentation (track 10)

Technical

- Janelle Monáe – recording (tracks 1–3, 5–7, 9–11, 13, 14), vocal production (tracks 1–3, 5, 7, 9, 11, 13), additional vocal production (track 10)
- Nate "Rocket" Wonder – recording (tracks 1–3, 5–7, 9–14), vocal production (tracks 1–3, 5, 7, 9, 11, 13)
- Riggs Morales – A&R
- Jon Brion – recording (track 4)
- Marco Sonzini – recording (track 5)
- Wynne Bennett – recording (track 7)
- Organized Noize – recording (track 10)
- Todd Bergman – additional engineering (tracks 1, 13)
- Mick Guzauski – mixing (tracks 1–7, 9–14)
- Şerban Ghenea – mixing (track 8)
- John Hanes – engineering for mix (track 8)
- Dave Kutch – mastering (tracks 1–7, 9–14)
- Justin Tranter – vocal production (track 8)
- Julia Michaels – vocal production (track 8)
- Chuck Lightning – additional vocal production (track 11)

Arrangement

- Nate "Rocket" Wonder – arrangement (tracks 1–3, 5, 6, 9–11, 13, 14), string arrangement (track 1)
- Roman GianArthur – arrangement (track 5)
- Nana Kwabena – arrangement (track 6)
- Wynne Bennett – arrangement (track 7)
- Janelle Monáe – musical arrangement (track 13)
- Jidenna – additional arrangement (track 5)

Design

- Chuck Lightning – creative direction
- The Wondaland Arts Society – creative direction
- Joe Perez – art direction
- Jenna Marsh – studio album art direction
- Free Marseille – design
- Abdul Ali – design
- JUCO – photography

== Charts ==
Chart (2018)	Peak position
Australian Albums (ARIA)	12
Austrian Albums (Ö3 Austria)	21
Belgian Albums (Ultratop Flanders)	12
Belgian Albums (Ultratop Wallonia)	67
Canadian Albums (Billboard)	8
Czech Albums (ČNS IFPI)	68
Danish Albums (Hitlisten)	30
Dutch Albums (Album Top 100)	20
German Albums (Offizielle Top 100)	29
Irish Albums (IRMA)	6
Italian Albums (FIMI)	68
Japanese Albums (Oricon)	133
New Zealand Albums (RMNZ)	14
Norwegian Albums (VG-lista)	18
Portuguese Albums (AFP)	24
Scottish Albums (Official Charts)	9
Spanish Albums (PROMUSICAE)	33
Swiss Albums (Schweizer Hitparade)	11
UK Albums (Official Charts)	8
US Billboard 200	6
US Top R&B/Hip-Hop Albums (Billboard)	4
