= Renaissance (Marcus Miller album) =

2012 album by Marcus Miller

Studio album by Marcus Miller
- Released: May 28, 2012
- Studio: Sear Sound (New York City, New York); Hannibal Studio (Santa Monica, California); Century 22 Recording (Long Beach, California); The Music Shed (New Orleans, Louisiana); The Funk Rehab Labs (Mesquite, Texas); Mix Room 103 (Lodi, New Jersey)
- Genre: Jazz-funk
- Length: 1:12:29
- Label: Concord Jazz
- Producer: Harold Goode (exec.); Harry Martin (exec.); Marcus Miller (also exec.)

Marcus Miller chronology
Thunder (2008)	Renaissance (2012)	Afrodeezia (2015)

Professional ratings
Review scores
Source	Rating
All About Jazz	4.5/5 stars
AllMusic	4/5 stars
Financial Times	5/5 stars
The Guardian	3/5 stars

Renaissance is the ninth solo studio album by American musician Marcus Miller. It was released on May 28, 2012, through Concord Jazz. Recording sessions took place at Sear Sound in New York City with additional recording at Hannibal Studio in Santa Monica and at the Music Shed in New Orleans. The album features contributions from Dr. John on vocals, Federico González Peña, Kris Bowers and Bobby Sparks on keyboards, Adam Rogers, Adam Agati and Paul Jackson Jr. on guitar, Louis Cato on drums, Ramon Yslas on percussion, Alex Han on alto saxophone, Maurice Brown and Sean Jones on trumpet, with guest appearances from Gretchen Parlato and Rubén Blades.

== Reception ==
Phil Wein of No Treble stated "This is definitely one of Marcus Miller’s best solo records and is an essential release for his fans and highly recommended for listeners who what to more occasionally get a taste of where Marcus is at. It’s not music to challenge a jazz audience with improvisation at the frontiers of sound, but you knew that. What it is: natural sounding music with intensity and groove designed to make an audience feel good. It’s funky music very well written and beautifully arranged. It’s smooth, soulful jazz. It’s deeply grooving music that combines jazz, funk, Brazilian and other influences effortlessly. It’s Marcus Miller at his best". S. Victor Aaron of Something Else! commented "Renaissance isn’t a revolutionary album, but there’s an attention to detail, the openness to a multitude of styles, and Miller’s strongest set of songs in some time. All of those things seemed to inspire the younger generation of players in his band to play up to the material and respond to Miller’s direction with a rare combination of looseness and preciseness. Where those guys go from here, that’s where the real rebirth will happen".

== Track listing ==
No.	Title	Writer(s)	Length
1.	"Detroit"	Marcus Miller	5:45
2.	"Redemption"	Marcus Miller	6:09
3.	"February"	Marcus Miller	4:15
4.	"Slippin' into Darkness"	Sylvester Allen; Harold Ray Brown; Morris Dickerson; LeRoy L. Jordan; Charles Miller; Lee Oskar; Howard E. Scott	9:17
5.	"Setembro (Brazilian Wedding Song)" (featuring Gretchen Parlato & Rubén Blades)	Ivan Lins; Gilson Peranzzetta	6:39
6.	"Jekyll & Hyde"	Marcus Miller	6:30
7.	"Nocturnal Mist" (Interlude)	Luther "Mano" Hanes	1:16
8.	"Revelation"	Marcus Miller	4:46
9.	"Mr. Clean"	Weldon Irvine, Jr.	5:01
10.	"Gorée (Go-ray)"	Marcus Miller	5:38
11.	"Cee-Tee-Eye"	Marcus Miller	7:39
12.	"Tightrope"	Charles Delbert Joseph II; Nathaniel Irvin III; Janelle Monáe; Antwan Patton	5:46
13.	"I'll Be There"	Harold Davis; William Hutchinson; Berry Gordy, Jr.; Bob West; Freddy Wexler	3:48
Total length:			1:12:29

== Personnel ==
- Marcus Miller – bass (1–4, 6–13), bass clarinet (5, 10), acoustic bass (5), fretless bass (5)
- Kris Bowers – acoustic piano (1, 4), Fender Rhodes (1, 11)
- Federico González Peña – Fender Rhodes (2, 5, 9), acoustic piano (3, 5–8, 10)
- Bobby Sparks – organ (4, 6, 9), clavinet (9)
- Adam Agati – guitars (1, 7, 8, 11, 12)
- Adam Rogers – guitars (2, 4, 6, 9), acoustic guitar (3, 10)
- Paul Jackson Jr. – guitars (11)
- Louis Cato – drums (1–12), djembe (3), congas (11)
- Ramon Yslas – percussion (4, 5, 7, 8)
- Alex Han – alto saxophone (1–12)
- Maurice "Mobetta" Brown – trumpet (1, 3, 4, 11)
- Sean Jones – trumpet (2, 4, 6, 9)
- Rubén Blades – vocals (5)
- Gretchen Parlato – vocals (5)
- Dr. John – vocals (12)

Production

- Harold Goode – executive producer, associate producer
- Harry Martin Jr. – executive producer
- Marcus Miller – executive producer, producer, arrangements, additional recording, liner notes
- David Isaac – mixing (1–8, 11)
- Taka Honda – mixing (10, 12, 13), additional recording
- Bruce Miller – mixing (9)
- Chris Allen – recording
- Chris Finney – additional recording
- Rod Steger – additional recording
- Kevin Harper – assistant engineer
- George Shaw – assistant engineer
- Darcy Proper – mastering at Wisseloord Studios (Hilversum, Netherlands)
- Bibi Green – production coordinator, recording session photography, artist management
- Jack Frisch – art direction, design
- Mathieu Zazzo – photography
- Josh Semolik – photo of Gretchen Parlato

== Chart history ==
Chart (2012)	Peak position
Belgian Albums (Ultratop Flanders)	141
Belgian Albums (Ultratop Wallonia)	138
Dutch Albums (Album Top 100)	26
French Albums (SNEP)	63
German Albums (Offizielle Top 100)	80
UK Jazz & Blues Albums (OCC)	5
US Billboard 200	170
US Top Jazz Albums (Billboard)	1
US Heatseekers Albums (Billboard)	3
