= Make Me Feel (Janelle Monáe song) =

Single by Janelle Monáe

from the album Dirty Computer
- Released: February 22, 2018
- Genre: Funk; R&B; pop
- Length: 3:14
- Label: Wondaland; Bad Boy; Atlantic
- Songwriters: Janelle Monáe Robinson; Julia Michaels; Mattias Larsson; Robin Fredriksson; Justin Tranter
- Producer: Mattman & Robin

Janelle Monáe singles chronology
| "Yoga" (2015) | "Make Me Feel" (2018) | "Django Jane" (2018) |

"Make Me Feel" is a song by American singer Janelle Monáe, released on February 22, 2018, as the lead single from her third studio album, Dirty Computer. This marks her return after a three-year hiatus. A departure from her longtime songwriting-production team of Nathaniel Irvin III and Roman GianArthur Irvin, Monáe co-wrote the song with Julia Michaels, Mattias Larsson, Robin Fredriksson, and Justin Tranter. Several critics compared it to the work of Prince, while Monáe herself had stated that Prince helped create sounds for the album, including for "Make Me Feel". It became Monáe's second single as a lead artist to chart on the US Billboard Hot 100, debuting and peaking at No. 99 the week of March 10, 2018.

== Critical reception ==
Writing for Pitchfork, Marcus J. Moore says of Monáe and the song, "The polymath unpacks a rubbery funk tune that recalls the likes of Prince and Sheila E. Her 1980s influences are clear, down to each massive synth line and the feeling of raw sensual energy woven throughout the song." Tatiana Pile of Spin wrote, "The single is a high-energy funk song with some reverent similarities to Prince's 'Kiss' ... With this bouncy single, Monáe taps into her unique soul-pop sound to deliver a song reminiscent of past tracks such as 'Q.U.E.E.N.' and 'Dance Apocalyptic'." In 2019, Billboard included the song in its list of the "30 Lesbian Love Songs".

== Music video ==
The single's official music video was uploaded to YouTube on February 22, 2018, the day of the single's release. Directed by frequent music video collaborator Alan Ferguson, the music video features Monáe and actress Tessa Thompson in a nightclub. Referred to by Monáe as an "emotion picture", the video heavily resembles the nightclub and plot shown in the Black Mirror episode, "San Junipero". Throughout the video, Monáe is seen flirting with both Thompson and a man; at one point, she runs between the two as if she cannot decide which one she wants. Ultimately, she dances with both. Also, throughout the video, the colors of the bisexual pride flag are displayed in the overhead lighting, so-called "bisexual lighting". The music video, as well as the song, was praised as a "bisexual anthem."

Writing for Billboard, Natalie Maher states the video "takes a more Prince-inspired approach, both musically and aesthetically, with the actress hitting an '80s-esque club with actress Tessa Thompson, and serving some of the best moves and looks we've seen from her. The video also features what seems to be an allusion to Robert Palmer's iconic '80s videos, with Monae playing a similarly white guitar, backed by her own group of funky female dancers."

The video received two nominations at the 35th MTV Video Music Awards in the categories "Best Art Direction" and "Best Editing".

== Live performances ==
Monáe has performed the song live on The Voice, The Late Show with Stephen Colbert, Austin City Limits, 61st Annual Grammy Awards, and 2019 Lollapalooza.

== Use in media ==
The song is the theme song for the Big Mouth spin-off Human Resources. A cover of the song was also used in a TV advertisement for the international fashion brand Calzedonia. In 2020, the song was used in an advertisement for Ritz Crackers Cheese Crispers. In 2021, the song was used in an advertisement for Discovery+. The “EDX Dubai Skyline Remix” version of the song was used in a 2019 advertisement for Old Navy, and a 2025 advertisement for HomeGoods. It was also used as the theme song for the seventh season of Love Island USA, in which the song received a streaming resurgence, spiking nearly 2,000% on Spotify in the U.S. In June 2026, Amazon used the song in a Prime Day advertisement campaign.

== Track listings ==
- Kaskade Remixes single
1. "Make Me Feel" (Kaskade Sunsoa Remix)
2. "Make Me Feel" (Kaskade REDUX Remix)
- EDX Dubai Skyline Remix single
1. "Make Me Feel" (EDX Dubai Skyline Remix)
- KC Lights Remix single
1. "Make Me Feel" (KC Lights Remix)
2. "Make Me Feel" (KC Lights Dub)

== Charts ==
=== Weekly charts ===
| Chart (2018) | Peak position |
|---|---|
| Belgium (Ultratip Bubbling Under Flanders) | 3 |
| Belgium (Ultratop 50 Wallonia) | 14 |
| Canada Hot 100 (Billboard) | 98 |
| France (SNEP) | 69 |
| Hungary (Single Top 40) | 19 |
| New Zealand Heatseekers (RMNZ) | 7 |
| Romania (Airplay 100) | 25 |
| Scottish Singles Sales (Official Charts) | 54 |
| UK Singles (Official Charts) | 74 |
| US Billboard Hot 100 | 99 |
| US Adult Alternative Airplay (Billboard) | 33 |
| US Adult R&B Songs (Billboard) | 30 |
| US Adult Pop Airplay (Billboard) | 32 |
| US Dance Club Songs (Billboard) | 5 |
| US Pop Airplay (Billboard) | 38 |
| US Rhythmic Airplay (Billboard) | 37 |

=== Year-end charts ===
| Chart (2018) | Position |
|---|---|
| Belgium (Ultratop Wallonia) | 90 |

== Certifications ==
| Region | Certification | Certified units/sales |
|---|---|---|
| Australia (ARIA) | Gold | 35,000^{‡} |
| Canada (Music Canada) | Platinum | 80,000^{‡} |
| United Kingdom (BPI) | Silver | 200,000^{‡} |
| United States (RIAA) | Gold | 500,000^{‡} |
^{‡} Sales+streaming figures based on certification alone.

== Release history ==
| Region | Date | Format(s) | Label | Ref. |
|---|---|---|---|---|
| Various | February 22, 2018 | Digital download | Bad Boy | |
| United States | February 27, 2018 | Contemporary hit radio | Atlantic | |
| United States | March 5, 2018 | Hot adult contemporary radio | Atlantic | |
| United States | March 6, 2018 | Urban radio | Atlantic | |
