= Pynk =

Single by Janelle Monáe featuring Grimes

from the album Dirty Computer
- Released: April 10, 2018
- Genre: R&B
- Length: 4:18
- Label: Wondaland; Bad Boy; Atlantic
- Songwriters: Janelle Robinson; Claire Boucher; Taylor Parks; Nathanial Irvin III; Charles Joseph II; Wynne Bennett; Steven Tyler; Glen Ballard; Richard Goodman
- Producers: Nate Wonder; Wynne Bennett; Chuck Lightning

Janelle Monáe singles chronology
| "Django Jane" (2018) | "Pynk" (2018) | "I Like That" (2018) |

Grimes singles chronology
| "Kill V. Maim" (2016) | "Pynk" (2018) | "Love4eva" (2018) |

Music video
- "Pynk" on YouTube

"Pynk" is a song recorded by American singer and songwriter Janelle Monáe for her third studio album, Dirty Computer (2018). It features Canadian art pop musician Grimes and interpolates the song "Pink" by Aerosmith, with members of the band being credited as co-writers. Lyrically, the song continues Monáe's female empowerment theme previously expressed in "Django Jane". The third single from Dirty Computer, a music video for the song was uploaded to YouTube on April 10, 2018.

== Background ==
Monáe describes the song as, "a celebration of creation, self love, sexuality and pussy power", and that the color pink "unites all of humanity" because it is the color "found in the deepest and darkest nooks and crannies of humans everywhere." In the Dirty Computer CD liner notes, Monáe describes the song's origins: "Inspired by Prince's mischievous smile as he played organ on "Hot Thang" and watched Cat Glover shimmy across the stage in "Sign O' The Times" and by Kali, Sheela Na Gig, Isis, Sheba, Athena, Medusa, Mary and all the Mothergoddess sculptures and paintings in pyramids, churches and castles around the world; midnight conversations and debates about The Great Cosmic Mother; insights from The Vagina by Naomi Wolff, and Interior Scroll by Carolee Schneemann and the calligraphy of Sun Ping; and Paul Simonon's quote that "pink is the only true rock n' roll color.""

== Critical reception ==
“Pynk” received critical acclaim. Pitchfork praised "Pynk" and awarded it Best New Track. Eve Barlow stated: "As an expression of unity and an appeal to see people beyond gender, the song’s genre-bending sonics and the video’s femme-dominated utopia underscore Monáe’s long-held desires for a more fluid society."

== Music video ==
The music video was directed by Emma Westenberg and was uploaded to Monáe's YouTube account on April 10, 2018. It features actress Tessa Thompson, a frequent collaborator of Monáe's. The plot finds Monáe and Thompson along with a group of other women dancing in a desert, having a slumber party and sitting out by a pool while expressing appreciation for the vagina. The distinctive pink vulva trousers worn by the dancers were designed by Duran Lantink.

== Awards and nominations ==
| Year | Organization | Award | Result | Ref. |
|---|---|---|---|---|
| 2018 | MTV Video Music Awards | Best Video with a Social Message | Nominated | |
| 2019 | Grammy Awards | Best Music Video | Nominated | |

== Use in media ==
The song is played at the end of episode 6 of Michaela Coel's drama I May Destroy You.

== Track listing ==
Digital download
| No. | Title | Length |
|---|---|---|
| 1. | "Pynk" | 4:02 |

Remix single
| No. | Title | Length |
|---|---|---|
| 1. | "Pynk (King Arthur Remix)" | 3:58 |

== Charts ==
| Chart (2018) | Peak position |
|---|---|
| Iceland (RÚV) | 14 |
| US Hot R&B Songs (Billboard) | 21 |
