= AMAI =

The Mexican Association of Marketing Research and Public Opinion Agencies (Spanish: Asociación Mexicana de Agencias de Investigación de Mercado y Opinión Pública) (AMAI) is the agency responsible for maintaining the transparency and quality in market research in Mexico, setting the standards of quality and socioeconomic levels.

== History ==
Founded in September 1992, AMAI is an independent organization of different Mexican companies doing market research, opinion and communication, whose purpose is to establish the quality standards as well as common standards in methods, techniques, terminology, analysis criteria, etc. that are related to market research inside Mexico.

It is an entity that brings together all the key Mexican industry players of research, who generate about three-quarters of the Mexican market.

Since its inception, AMAI established its own Code of Ethics and standardize the criteria for socio-economic levels in Mexico, which has led to greater transparency in the investigation and the possibility of comparing the results produced by different agencies. The first index of socio-economic levels occurred in 1994, becoming the standard criteria of classification used in the country. The current index is known as the "Rule 13x6" which classifies into 6 levels the households in Mexico.

In 1999 was a protocol abbreviate "ESIMM" (Standard of Service for the Market Research in Mexico) which set the substantive requirements of quality to be observed in any undertaking of research that is operating in Mexico. While originally adopted on a voluntary basis is now, a mandatory requirement to gain access to the Association.

In 2006 an agreement with ESOMAR (European Society for Opinion and Marketing Research) was made to offer online courses offered by the University of Georgia to 3 countries, in that same year, another webpage was launched as a medium hub of electoral survey results; by the end of 2009 the concept was expanded to include references on social surveys and general interest.

According to the newspaper La Jornada, the Federal Electoral Institute (IFE) announced a new legislation with which companies must comply in order to raise sample surveys as well as exit polls and/or quick counts during the election process that occur in Mexico, these changes take place after the electoral reform in 2008.

One of the main roles of AMAI is to ensure that all marketing companies in Mexico receive the certification as well as the ISO. For over 15 years this association, AMAI, publishes a quarterly magazine and teaches a course at ITAM University of Marketing Research.

From 1992 AMAI has had several presidents who held office for a period of two years, these are chosen by an assembly. The presidents since AMAI's founding are:

Ruben Jara 1992–1994
Abraham Nadelsticher 1994–1996
Ana Cristina Covarrubias 1996–1998
Eduardo Berumen 1998–2000
Javier Alagón 2000–2002
Cesar Ortega de la Roquette 2002–2004
Manuel Barberena 2004–2006
Eduardo Ragasol 2006–2008
Ricardo Barrueta 2008–2010
Gabriela de la Riva 2010–2012
Luis Woldenberg Karakowsky 2012–2014
Heriberto López Romo 2014-2016
Óscar Balcázar Quintero 2016-2018

Until 2016 AMAI had about 55+ agencies affiliated and 6 more with a beginners status.
