= Jeremy Geffen =

American entertainment executive, founder of Creative Rights Group

Jeremy Nathaniel Geffen
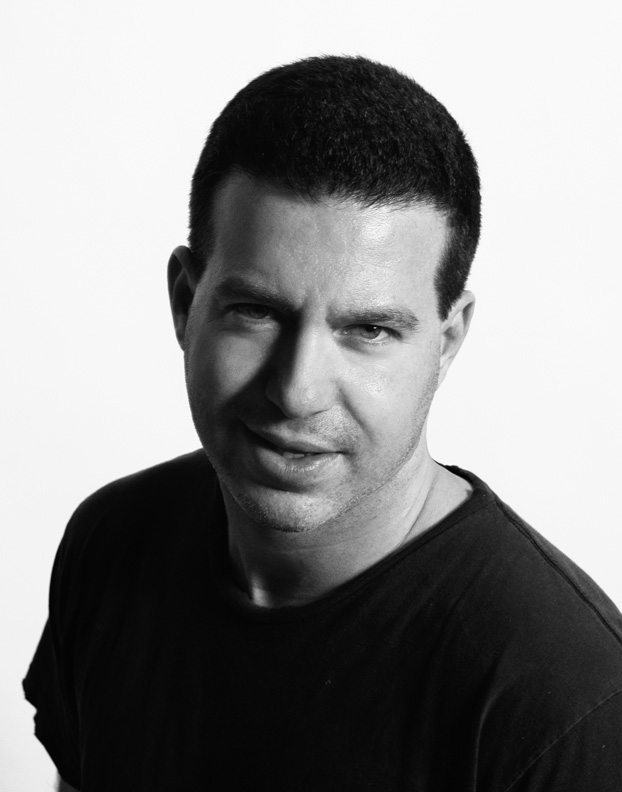
- Born: December 29, 1972; New York City, NY
- Died: August 22, 2018 (aged 45); Los Angeles, CA
- Education: University of Southern California
- Occupations: President & CEO of the Creative Rights Group

Jeremy Nathaniel Geffen (December 29, 1972 – August 22, 2018) was an American entrepreneur, third generation entertainment executive, and the president and CEO of Creative Rights Group, which he founded in 2014 in Los Angeles. He was also the founder and president of Geffen Management Group, which manages music artists, actors, and celebrity estates.

== Early life and career ==
Geffen was born in New York City on December 29, 1972, the son of Jo-Ann Geffen, a music executive, publicist and manager of such artists as Lionel Richie and the Commodores during the group's earlier days. He was not related to producer and studio executive David Geffen

Geffen attended Ojai Valley School in Ojai, California, and graduated from Birmingham High School in Van Nuys, California, in 1991. He had a bachelor's degree in Business from the University of Southern California.

While in college, studying to become an investment banker, Geffen took a summer job in the mail room at the William Morris Agency. That convinced him he wanted to be in the entertainment business. Later, he was with the Wright Entertainment Group, where he worked with musicians including Justin Timberlake and Britney Spears.

Geffen later became a talent manager for Lindsay Scott Management, well known for managing Janet Jackson and Cher. He worked with Metta World Peace (Ron Artest), Christina Milian, Sean Combs, Sisqó, and Dru Hill.

Geffen eventually founded Jeremy Geffen Entertainment, where he managed artists including Robin Gibb, Smokey Robinson, Bone Thugs-n-Harmony, and the rap group, D12. Geffen sold Jeremy Geffen Entertainment to Sanctuary Management.

== Later ventures ==
=== Geffen Management Group ===
After leaving Sanctuary Management, Geffen presided over Geffen Management Group, representing talent including Smokey Robinson and Jacob Latimore and the Marvin Gaye estate.

=== Creative Rights Group ===
Geffen was the president and CEO of the Creative Rights Group, a company he founded in 2014 to monetize copyrights and assets on behalf of performing artists. The Creative Rights Group handled over $150 million for clients including Smokey Robinson and The Isley Brothers.

=== Sexual Assault Convictions ===
In March 2008, Geffen was arrested by the Los Angeles Police Department on suspicion of three sexual assaults. In 2008, Geffen pled guilty to two cases of statutory rape and received five years probation, which was eventually reduced to about 2.5 years.

== Death ==
Geffen died on August 22, 2018, at age 45. The coroner ruled the death as accidental, due to "acute fentanyl-cocaine-ethanol-methamphetamine-methylenedioxymethamphetamine [MDMA] toxicity".
