= I Like That (Janelle Monáe song) =

2018 single by Janelle Monáe

Single by Janelle Monáe

from the album Dirty Computer
- Released: August 17, 2018
- Length: 3:20
- Label: Wondaland; Bad Boy; Atlantic
- Songwriter(s): Janelle Robinson; Nathanial Irvin III; Taylor Parks; Ray Murray; Rico Wade; Patrick L. Brown
- Producer(s): Organized Noize; Nate "Rocket" Wonder; Chuck Lightning; Janelle Monáe

Janelle Monáe singles chronology
"Pynk" (2018)	"I Like That" (2018)	"That’s Enough" (2019)

I Like That is a song by American singer Janelle Monáe from her third studio album Dirty Computer. It was first released as a promotional single on April 23, 2018, before being released as the fourth single from the album on August 17, 2018. Three remix singles were released for the song on August 17, August 24, and November 9, 2018. The song peaked at number 14 on the Hot R&B Songs chart, number one on the Adult R&B Songs chart, and was certified Gold in the United States in May 2020.

== Track listing ==
Remix single
No.	Title	Length
1.	"I Like That (Easy Star All-Stars & Michael Goldwasser Reggae Remix)"	3:32

Remix single
No.	Title	Length
1.	"I Like That (Naxxos Remix)"	2:51

Remix single
No.	Title	Length
1.	"I Like That (Fabich Remix)"	4:30

== Accolades ==
Year	Award	Category	Result
2019	ASCAP Award	Top R&B/Hip-hop songs	Won
2019	AICP Post Award	Best Color Grading Music Video	Nominated

== Charts ==
Chart (2018)	Peak position
US Adult R&B Songs (Billboard)	1
US R&B/Hip-Hop Airplay (Billboard)	19

== Certifications ==
Region	Certification	Certified units/sales
United States (RIAA)	Gold	500,000^{‡}
^{‡} Sales+streaming figures based on certification alone.
