= Willa Amai =

American folk musician

- Born: April 1, 2004 (age 22); Los Angeles, California, U.S.
- Genres: Folk
- Occupations: Musician, singer-songwriter
- Years active: 2010s–present
- Label: We Are Hear

Willa Amai (born in April 2004) is an American folk musician from Los Angeles, California. Amai has been releasing music since she was a pre-teen. She started writing songs at age 9, and signed with Linda Perry at age 12. Amai released her debut album in 2021 titled I Can Go To Bed Whenever. Amai has been profiled in Rolling Stone, People, and American Songwriter.
