= Django Jane =

Single by Janelle Monáe

from the album Dirty Computer
- Released: February 22, 2018
- Recorded: 2015–2018
- Genre: Hip hop
- Length: 3:13
- Label: Wondaland; Bad Boy; Atlantic
- Songwriters: Janelle Monáe Robinson; Nathaniel Irvin III; Nana Kwabena Tuffuor
- Producers: Nate "Rocket" Wonder; Nana Kwabena

Janelle Monáe singles chronology
"Make Me Feel" (2018)	"Django Jane" (2018)	"Pynk" (2018)

"Django Jane" is a song recorded by singer and songwriter Janelle Monáe, released on February 22, 2018 as the second single, alongside "Make Me Feel", from her third studio album, Dirty Computer. The song features Monáe rapping instead of singing and makes a direct reference to Monáe's debut studio album, The ArchAndroid. Lyrically, it has many black feminist themes. A music video was released on the same day as the single.

== Background ==
On February 16, 2018, Monáe revealed her third studio album, entitled Dirty Computer, through a teaser video released on YouTube. Following up on that announcement, she released both "Django Jane" and "Make Me Feel" as the first two singles from the album.

In an interview with The Guardian, Monáe stated "Django Jane" is "a response to me feeling the sting of the threats being made to my rights as a woman, as a black woman, as a sexually liberated woman, even just as a daughter with parents who have been oppressed for many decades. Black women and those who have been the 'other', and the marginalised in society – that's who I wanted to support, and that was more important than my discomfort about speaking out."

== Critical reception ==
Writing for XXL, C. Vernon Coleman II states, "The track finds JM tapping into a hip-hop vein and seriously going hard with the rap bars. The singer chooses a heavy-hitting track, as the punching bass kicks drive the instrumental."

== Music video ==
The official music video for the single was uploaded to YouTube on February 22, 2018, the same day as the single's release. The "emotion picture" was directed by Andrew Donoho and Chuck Lightning. In the video, Monáe is surrounded by many women and is shown wearing both a red and green suit. During one scene, she visually references a scene from Sebastián Lelio's Chilean film A Fantastic Woman. After being asked about Monáe using such a significant scene from his 2017 film, Lelio stated, "I love Janelle Monaé and I love her new song. I don't know if she saw 'A Fantastic Woman' and if the moment with the round mirror between Marina's legs inspired her. But anyway, it's exciting to see it reflected — pun intended — in her new video."

Writing for Billboard, Natalie Maher states, "Sitting atop a throne, and surrounded by a female army in matching suits, Monae delivers an empowering anthem on "Django Jane." On the track, she confidently raps about gender, race and the intersection of it all: "Remember when they used to say I looked too man-ish, black girl magic, y'all cant stand it." Of course, the video also features mentions of "pussy power," and raised-fist symbolism." C. Vernon Colemen of XXL states, "The visual is directed by Andrew Donoho and finds Janelle playing the role of crown-holder as she takes her place on her throne, while surrounded by a group of women who look like they mean business. They later break out into a choreographed dance routine while Janelle spits her bars."

== Charts ==
Chart (2018)	Peak position
US Rap Digital Songs (Billboard)	23
