= Hedda Gabler (disambiguation) =

Hedda Gabler is an 1891 play by Henrik Ibsen.

Hedda Gabler may also refer to:

- Hedda Tesman (née Gabler), the title character of Hedda Gabler
- Hedda Gabler (1920 film), an Italian film
- Hedda Gabler (1925 film), a German film
- Hedda Gabler (1961 film), an Australian film
- Hedda Gabler (2016 film), a British film

== See also ==
- Hedda Gabler filmography
- Hedda (disambiguation)
