= Hedda =

Hedda may refer to:

== Arts and entertainment ==
- Hedda Award, a Norwegian theatre award
- Hedda Gabler, a play by Henrik Ibsen
- Hedda (1975 film), a film based on the play
- Hedda (2025 film), an American film based on the play

== Other uses ==
- Hedda (given name), a feminine given name
- Hedda Lettuce, stage name of American drag queen, comedian and singer Steve Polito (born 1968)
- 207 Hedda, an asteroid

== See also ==
- Hedda Gabler (disambiguation)
