= List of awards and nominations received by Tessa Thompson =

Tessa Thompson awards and nominations
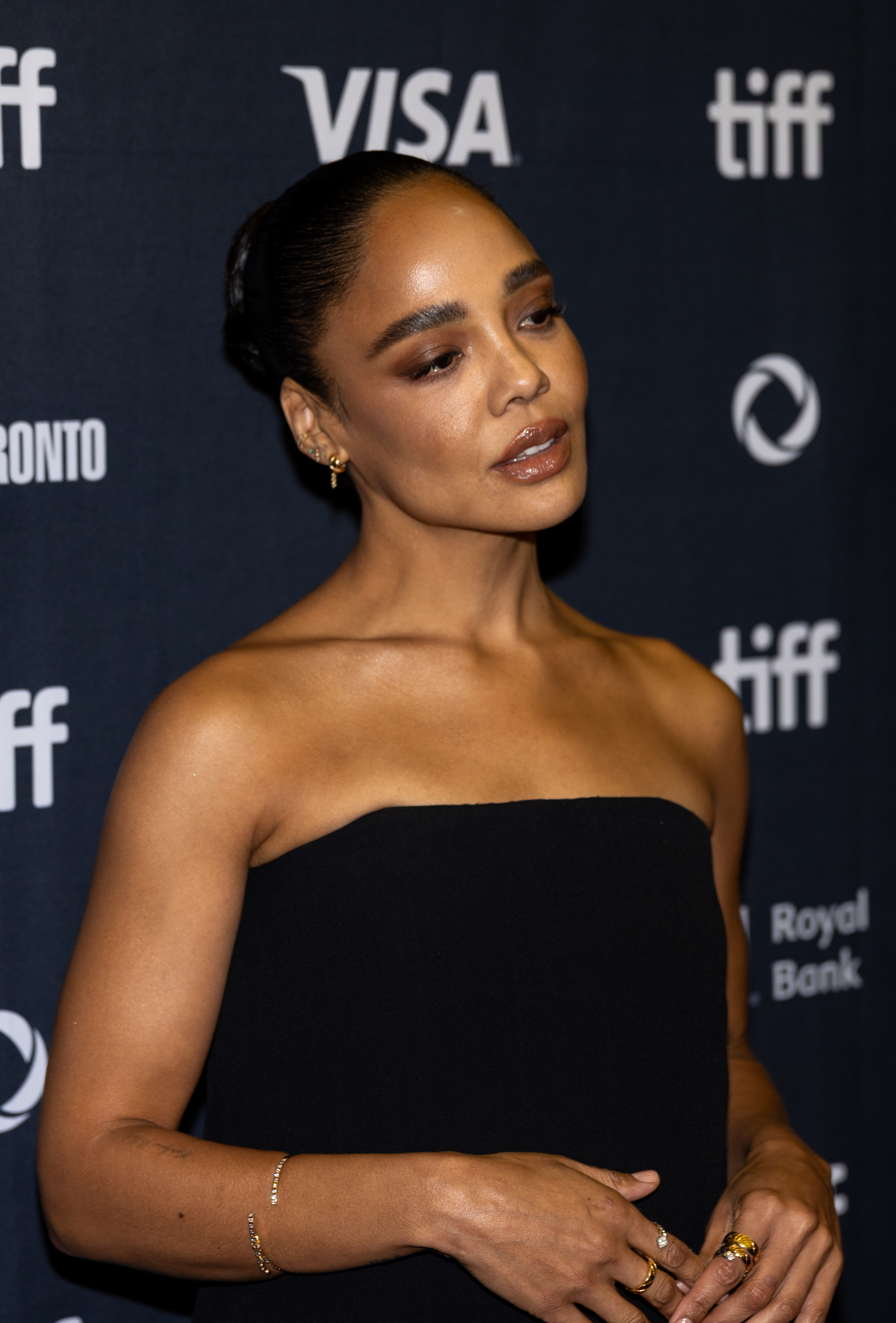
- Thompson at the TIFF in 2025
Awards and nominations
Award	Wins	Nominations
Astra Film Awards	0	1
BAFTA Awards	0	2
Critics' Choice Awards	0	2
Golden Globe Awards	0	1
Emmy Awards	0	1
NAACP Image Awards	1	6
Saturn Awards	0	2

Totals (Note: Certain award groups do not simply award one winner. They acknowledge several different recipients, have runners-up, and have third place. Since this is a specific recognition and is different from losing an award, runner-up mentions are considered wins in this award tally. For simplification and to avoid errors, each award in this list has been presumed to have had a prior nomination.)
- Wins: 11
- Nominations: 28

Tessa Thompson is an American actress. She is known for her complex and varied roles spanning genres ranging from Hollywood blockbusters to independent film. Thompson has received nominations from several organizations including for two BAFTA Awards, two Critics' Choice Awards, an Emmy Award and a Golden Globe Award as well as wins for a Gotham Award and an NAACP Image Award.

Thompson gained critical attention and praise for her early film role as a passionate student in the comedy-drama Dear White People (2014) for which she won the Gotham Independent Film Award for Breakthrough Performer. That same year she portrayed civil rights activist Diane Nash in the Ava DuVernay directed historical drama Selma (2014) for which she was nominated alongside the cast for the Critics' Choice Movie Award for Best Acting Ensemble. Thompson was also nominated for the BAFTA Rising Star Award in 2017. She portrayed a Black woman navigating complex emotional and social terrain in 1920s Harlem in the Rebecca Hall directed Netflix period drama Passing (2021). The role earned her nominations for the BAFTA Award for Best Actress in a Leading Role and the Gotham Independent Film Award for Outstanding Lead Performance.

She gained mainstream attention for her roles in franchise films playing Bianca Taylor in the sports drama films Creed (2015), Creed II (2018) and Creed III (2023) as well as for her starring role as Valkyrie in the Marvel Cinematic Universe superhero films Thor: Ragnarok (2017), Avengers: Endgame (2019), and Thor: Love and Thunder (2022), as well as her leading role in the science fiction franchise film Men in Black: International (2019). During this time she also starred in the independent films Sorry to Bother You (2018), Little Woods (2018), and Annihilation (2018).

On television, she played the dual role of Charlotte Hale / Dolores Abernathy in the HBO dystopian science fiction series Westworld (2016–2022), for which she was nominated for the Saturn Award for Best Supporting Actress on Television. She also portrayed the romantic lead in the Amazon Studios romance drama Sylvie's Love (2020), with her performance receiving a nomination for the Critics' Choice Television Award for Best Actress in a Movie/Miniseries. As a producer on the film, she was nominated for the Primetime Emmy Award for Outstanding Television Movie.

== Major associations ==
=== BAFTA Awards ===
Year	Category	Nominated work	Result	Ref.
British Academy Film Awards
2017	Rising Star		Nominated	
2021	Best Actress in a Leading Role	Passing	Nominated	

=== Critics Choice Awards ===
Year	Category	Nominated work	Result	Ref.
Critics Choice Movie Awards
2014	Best Acting Ensemble	Selma	Nominated	
Critics' Choice Television Awards
2021	Best Actress in a Limited Series or Television Movie	Sylvie's Love	Nominated	
Celebration of Cinema and Television
2025	Actress Award – Film	Hedda	Won	

=== Emmy Awards ===
Year	Category	Nominated work	Result	Ref.
Primetime Emmy Awards
2021	Outstanding Television Movie	Sylvie's Love	Nominated	

=== Golden Globe Awards ===
Year	Category	Nominated work	Result	Ref.
2026	Best Actress in a Motion Picture – Drama	Hedda	Nominated	

== Critics associations ==
Organizations	Year	Category	Work	Result	Ref.
African-American Film Critics Association	2014	Breakthrough Performance	Dear White People	Won	
African-American Film Critics Association	2015	Best Supporting Actress	Creed	Won	
African-American Film Critics Association	2025	Best Actress	Hedda	Won	
Alliance of Women Film Journalists	2021	Breakthrough Performance	Passing	Nominated	
Dorian Awards	2021	Film Performance of the Year	Passing	Nominated	
Dorian Awards	2026	Film Performance of the Year	Hedda	Nominated	
Dorian Awards	2026	LBTQ Film of the Year (as producer)	Hedda	Nominated	
Dorian Awards	2026	GALECA LGBTQIA+ Film Trailblazer	Herself	Nominated	
Georgia Film Critics Association	2015	Breakthrough Award	Herself	Nominated	
New York Film Critics Online Awards	2021	Best Actress	Passing	Won	
Online Association of Female Film Critics	2021	Best Actress	Passing	Nominated	
San Diego Film Critics Society	2014	Best Ensemble	Selma	Nominated	
Savannah Film Festival	2025	Distinguished Performance Award	Hedda	Won	
Women Film Critics Circle Awards	2021	Best Screen Couple	Passing (with Ruth Negga)	Won	
Washington D.C. Film Critics Awards	2014	Best Ensemble	Selma	Nominated	
Washington D.C. Film Critics Awards	2021	Best Actress	Passing	Nominated	

== Miscellaneous awards ==
Organizations	Year	Category	Work	Result	Ref.
American Black Film Festival	2009	Best Actor	Mississippi Damned	Won	
Astra Film Awards	2026	Best Actress in a Motion Picture – Drama	Hedda	Nominated	
Black Reel Movie Awards	2011	Outstanding Breakthrough Performance	For Colored Girls	Won	
Black Reel Movie Awards	2015	Outstanding Actress	Dear White People	Nominated	
Black Reel Movie Awards	2016	Outstanding Supporting Actress	Creed	Won	
Black Reel Movie Awards	2018	Outstanding Supporting Actress	Thor: Ragnarok	Nominated	
Black Reel Movie Awards	2022	Outstanding Actress	Passing	Won	
Black Reel Movie Awards	2026	Outstanding Lead Performance	Hedda	Nominated	
Black Reel Awards for Television	2018	Outstanding Supporting Actress - Drama Series	Westworld	Nominated	
Black Reel Awards for Television	2021	Outstanding Actress	Sylvie's Love	Nominated	
Black Reel Awards for Television	2026	Outstanding Lead Performance in a Limited Series or TV Movie	His & Hers	Won	
Empire Awards	2018	Best Female Newcomer	Thor: Ragnarok	Nominated	
Fargo Film Festival	2019	Best Actress	Little Woods	Won	
Gotham Awards	2014	Breakthrough Actor	Dear White People	Won	
Gotham Awards	2021	Outstanding Lead Performance	Passing	Nominated	
Gotham Awards	2025	Outstanding Lead Performance	Hedda	Nominated	
Gotham Awards	2025	Spotlight Tribute Award	Herself	Honored	
Hamptons International Film Festival	2015	Breakthrough Performer	Selma	Won	
Independent Spirit Awards	2025	Best Lead Performer	Hedda	Nominated	
NAACP Image Awards	2014	Outstanding Actress in a Motion Picture	Dear White People	Nominated	
NAACP Image Awards	2016	Outstanding Supporting Actress in a Motion Picture	Creed	Nominated	
NAACP Image Awards	2018	Outstanding Supporting Actress in a Motion Picture	Thor: Ragnarok	Nominated	
NAACP Image Awards	2021	Outstanding Actress in a TV Movie or Limited-Series	Sylvie's Love	Nominated	
NAACP Image Awards	2022	Outstanding Actress in a Motion Picture	Passing	Nominated	
NAACP Image Awards	2026	Outstanding Actress in a Motion Picture	Hedda	Nominated	
People's Choice Awards	2019	Favorite Female Movie Star	Men in Black: International	Nominated	
Saturn Awards	2018	Best Supporting Actress	Thor: Ragnarok	Nominated	
Saturn Awards	2021	Best Supporting Actress on a Television Series	Westworld	Nominated	
Teen Choice Awards	2016	Choice Movie Actress: Drama	Creed	Nominated	
Teen Choice Awards	2018	Choice Movie Actress: Sci-Fi	Westworld	Nominated	
Teen Choice Awards	2019	Choice Action Movie Actress	Men in Black: International	Nominated	
