= Hedda Gabler filmography =

Hedda Gabler is a play written by Norwegian playwright Henrik Ibsen. Published in 1890, it has been the subject of many film and television adaptations, including:

- Hedda Gabler (1917), silent film, United States
- Hedda Gabler (1920), silent film, Italy
- Hedda Gabler (1925), silent film, Germany, starring Asta Nielsen
- A live production of Hedda Gabler, condensed to one hour, was presented on television in 1954 on The United States Steel Hour
- Hedda Gabler (1957), United Kingdom, televised play
- Hedda Gabler (1961 film), Yugoslavia
- Hedda Gabler (1961 TV production), Australia
- Hedda Gabler (1962 film), United Kingdom TV production, BBC, starring Ingrid Bergman.
- Hedda Gabler (1963 TV film), Germany, starring Ruth Leuwerik
- Hedda Gabler (1972), United Kingdom TV film
- Hedda Gabler (1975 film), Norway
- Hedda (1975), United Kingdom, film starring Glenda Jackson
- Hedda Gabler (1978 film), Belgium
- Hedda Gabler (1979 film), Italy
- Hedda Gabler (1980 television production) starring Diana Rigg
- Hedda Gabler (1981 film), United Kingdom
- Hedda Gabler (1984 film), Belgium
- Hedda Gabler (1993 film), Sweden
- Hedda Gabler (1993), TV broadcast of a National Theatre production, starring Fiona Shaw
- Hedda Gabler (2004 film), United States
- Hedda Gabler (2016 film), starring Rita Ramnani
- Hedda (2025 film), United States, starring Tessa Thompson
