= Tango Entertainment =

American film production company

Tango Productions, LLC
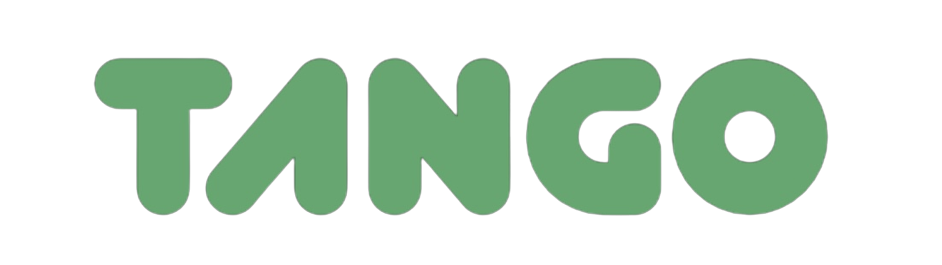
- Trade name: Tango Entertainment
- Type: Private
- Industry: Film industry
- Founded: 2017; 9 years ago
- Founder: Lia Buman; Tim Headington
- Headquarters: Los Angeles, California, U.S.
- Area served: United States
- Website: tango-entertainment.com

Tango Productions, LLC, doing business as Tango Entertainment, is an American film production company founded in 2017 by Lia Buman and Tim Headington. The company produced the films Little Woods (2018) The Old Man & the Gun (2018), Skate Kitchen (2019), Little Fish (2020), Never Rarely Sometimes Always (2020), Resurrection (2022), and Aftersun (2022).

== History ==
In January 2017, Lia Buman and Tim Headington launched the company, aiming to finance and produce film and television series. The company's first film Skate Kitchen had its world premiere at the Sundance Film Festival in January 2018, and was released in August 2018, by Magnolia Pictures. Little Woods directed by Nia DaCosta, premiered at the Tribeca Film Festival in April 2018, and was released in April 2019, by Neon.

== Filmography ==
=== 2010s ===
Release Date	Title	Notes
August 10, 2018	Skate Kitchen	distributed by Magnolia Pictures
September 28, 2018	The Old Man & the Gun	distributed by Fox Searchlight Pictures
April 19, 2019	Little Woods	distributed by Neon
April 19, 2019	Rafiki	distributed by Film Movement

=== 2020s ===
Release Date	Title	Notes
February 7, 2020	Come to Daddy	distributed by Saban Films
March 13, 2020	Never Rarely Sometimes Always	distributed by Focus Features
March 20, 2020	Blow the Man Down	distributed by Amazon Studios
May 8, 2020	How to Build a Girl	distributed by IFC Films
August 28, 2020	Get Duked!	distributed by Amazon Studios
February 5, 2021	Little Fish	distributed by IFC Films
April 23, 2021	Together Together	distributed by Bleecker Street
January 14, 2022	Italian Studies	distributed by Magnolia Pictures
August 5, 2022	Resurrection	distributed by IFC Films and Shudder
October 21, 2022	Aftersun	distributed by A24
November 4, 2022	Weird: The Al Yankovic Story	distributed by The Roku Channel
August 4, 2023	Shortcomings	distributed by Sony Pictures Classics
March 1, 2024	Spaceman	distributed by Netflix
April 5, 2024	Housekeeping for Beginners	distributed by Focus Features
September 6, 2024	His Three Daughters	distributed by Netflix
April 25, 2025	Magic Farm	distributed by Mubi
June 27, 2025	Sorry, Baby	distributed by A24
July 30, 2025	Together	distributed by Neon
September 12, 2025	The History of Sound	distributed by Mubi
August 21, 2026	Dreams in Nightmares	distributed by Lunette Films

=== Upcoming ===
Release Date	Title	Notes
October 23, 2026	Wicker	distributed by Black Bear Pictures
TBA	The Surgeon	distributed by Sony Pictures Releasing
