= The Listener (film) =

2022 film by Steve Buscemi

- Theatrical release poster
- Directed by: Steve Buscemi
- Written by: Alessandro Camon
- Produced by: Wren Arthur; Steve Buscemi; Oren Moverman; Lauren Hantz; Tessa Thompson
- Starring: Tessa Thompson
- Cinematography: Anka Malatynska
- Edited by: Kate Williams
- Music by: Aska Matsumiya
- Production companies: Hantz Motion Pictures; Olive Productions; Sight Unseen Pictures
- Distributed by: Vertical Entertainment
- Release dates: September 9, 2022 (Venice); March 29, 2024 (United States)
- Running time: 96 minutes
- Country: United States
- Language: English

The Listener is a 2022 American drama film directed by Steve Buscemi and written by Alessandro Camon. It stars Tessa Thompson in the film's only on-screen role as a helpline volunteer.

The film premiered at the 2022 Venice International Film Festival, and was released in the United States by Vertical Entertainment on March 29, 2024.

== Plot ==
Beth, a "listener" for callers to simply talk to, receives a call from a previous inmate who was just released a year ago, a man that just told his wife he doesn't love her anymore and a young woman whose abusive boyfriend wants to pimp her out which upsets Beth. Beth then receives a call from a child sex offender, and he talks about his recent actions and asks Beth personal questions about her looks, challenging her that she doesn't understand his problems and difficulties because she's "good looking" and that he is horrid, and an evolutionary failure. She soon becomes uncomfortable speaking to this individual and ends the call. As she goes through each call she receives, she uses methods to deter her vulnerability but also provides resources and encouragement to the callers.

== Cast ==
- Tessa Thompson as Beth

=== Voice cast ===
- Margaret Cho as Corinne
- Rebecca Hall as Laura
- Alia Shawkat as Sharon
- Logan Marshall-Green as Michael
- Derek Cecil as Andy
- Blu del Barrio as Jinx
- Ricky Velez as Ellis
- Jamie Hector as Ray
- Casey Wilson as Ruby
- Bobby Soto as Chris

== Production ==
The Listener was directed by Buscemi from a script by Alessandro Camon. It is an American co-production between Olive Productions, Sight Unseen Pictures, and Hantz Motion Pictures.

Principal photography took place in Los Angeles between August and September 2021.

== Release ==
The Listener premiered as the closing film of the Giornate Degli Autori section of the 2022 Venice International Film Festival on September 9, 2022. It also screened in Industry Selects section of the 2022 Toronto International Film Festival.

In February 2024, Vertical Entertainment acquired distribution rights to the film in North America, United Kingdom and Ireland, scheduling it for a day-and-date release in the United States on March 29, 2024.

== Reception ==
On the review aggregator website Rotten Tomatoes, 74% of 46 critics' reviews are positive, with an average rating of 6.60/10. Metacritic, which uses a weighted average, assigned the film a score of 64 out of 100, based on 9 critics, indicating "generally favorable" reviews.
