= The Grand Romantic =

- Directed by: Anthony Mandler
- Written by: Sloane Crosley
- Produced by: Kim Bradshaw
- Starring: Nate Ruess
- Cinematography: Malik Hassan Sayeed
- Edited by: Jeff Selis
- Music by: Nate Ruess
- Production company: Apple Music
- Release date: 2015
- Running time: 28 minutes
- Country: United States
- Language: English

The Grand Romantic is a 28-minute short film directed by Anthony Mandler and written by Sloane Crosley.

The film was commissioned by Apple Music, who approached Nate Ruess, frontman of American indie-pop band FUN. while he was in the process of making his latest album, Grand Romantic. The film follows an artist (Nate) in the midst of failing to reach the greatness of his previous albums, and being pressured by most of the people around him to make something even better. During this time, he falls in love with his Boss' secretary, played by Tessa Thompson.

The film is set in the 1970s, but makes direct references to recent things, like the two Grammys that the band was awarded in 2013. The film also makes references to time in the 70s, such as when the producer says "Maybe, some day in the future, there will be some magical device that will automatically tune your pitch", a reference to Auto-Tune and computer audio editing, which didn't exist at that time.

== Distribution ==
The film premiered exclusively on Apple Music, as four separate "Chapters", with one uploaded every day to Nate Ruess' Apple Music Connect page, from August 17–20, 2015. The film has since been uploaded in full on both Apple Music and the iTunes Store.
