= Tessa Thompson =

American actress (born 1983)

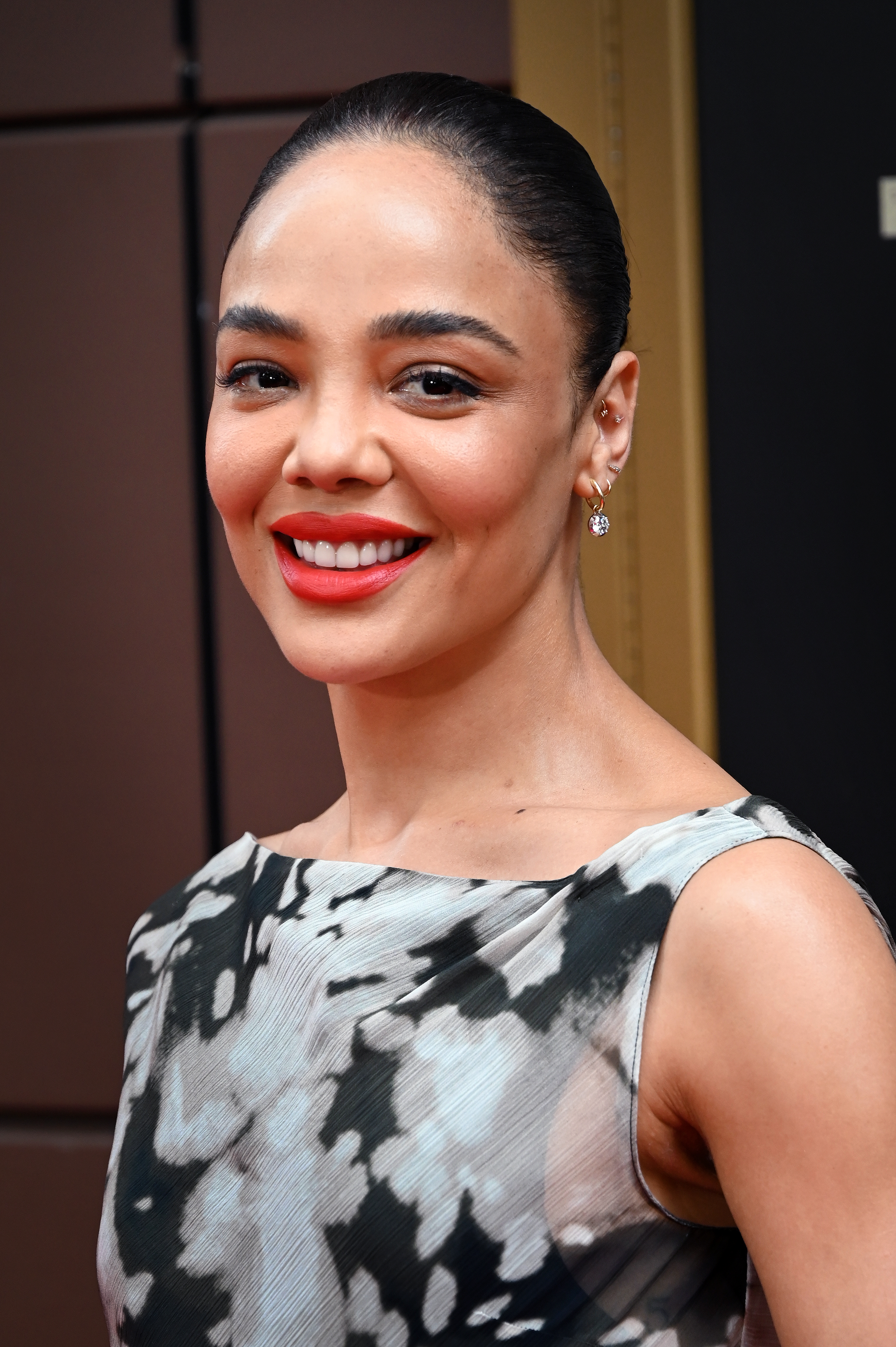
- Thompson in 2026
- Born: Tessa Lynne Thompson; October 3, 1983 (age 43); Los Angeles, California, U.S.
- Education: Santa Monica College
- Occupation: Actress
- Years active: 2002–present
- Relatives: Zsela (half-sister)
- Awards: Full list

Tessa Lynne Thompson (born October 3, 1983) is an American actress. Known for her roles in both blockbusters and independent dramas, her accolades include nominations for two BAFTA Awards, a Golden Globe Award, and a Primetime Emmy Award.

Thompson began her professional acting career with the Los Angeles Women's Shakespeare Company while studying at Santa Monica College, acting in productions of The Tempest and Romeo and Juliet. She made her film debut in the horror film When a Stranger Calls (2006) followed by leading roles in the independent drama Mississippi Damned (2009) and Tyler Perry's For Colored Girls (2010). Thompson gained favorable notices for roles in the comedy-drama Dear White People (2014), and as civil rights activist Diane Nash in Ava DuVernay's historical drama Selma (2014).

She gained mainstream attention for her roles in franchise films, playing Bianca Taylor in the sports dramas Creed (2015), Creed II (2018) and Creed III (2023), and as Valkyrie in the Marvel Cinematic Universe, including the movies Thor: Ragnarok (2017) and Thor: Love and Thunder (2022), as well as her leading role in Men in Black: International (2019). She starred in the independent films Sorry to Bother You, Little Woods, and Annihilation (all 2018). For her role as a black woman living during the Harlem Renaissance in Passing (2021) she earned a nomination for the BAFTA Award. She took the title role in Hedda (2025), which she also executive produced, earning a Golden Globe Award nomination.

On television, she took roles in shows such as the teen mystery series Veronica Mars (2005–2006), the historical drama series Copper (2012–2013), the science fiction series Westworld (2016–2022), and the thriller miniseries His & Hers (2026). She starred in the Prime Video romantic drama film Sylvie's Love (2020) and also served as an executive producer where she received a nomination for the Primetime Emmy Award for Outstanding Television Movie. On stage, she made her Broadway debut in the Lindsey Ferrentino play The Fear of 13 (2026).

== Early life and education ==
Thompson was born on October 3, 1983, in Los Angeles, California, and raised between Los Angeles and Brooklyn, New York. Her father, singer-songwriter Marc Anthony Thompson, is Afro-Panamanian and the founder of the musical collective Chocolate Genius, Inc. Her mother is reported as "half-Mexican, half-white". Her younger paternal half-sister, Zsela, is a singer and songwriter.

Thompson attended Santa Monica High School where she played Hermia in a student production of A Midsummer Night's Dream, and attended Santa Monica College (SMC) where she studied cultural anthropology. While at SMC, she attended lectures by Lisa Wolpe of the Los Angeles Women's Shakespeare Company (LAWSC).

== Career ==
=== 2002–2013: Early work ===
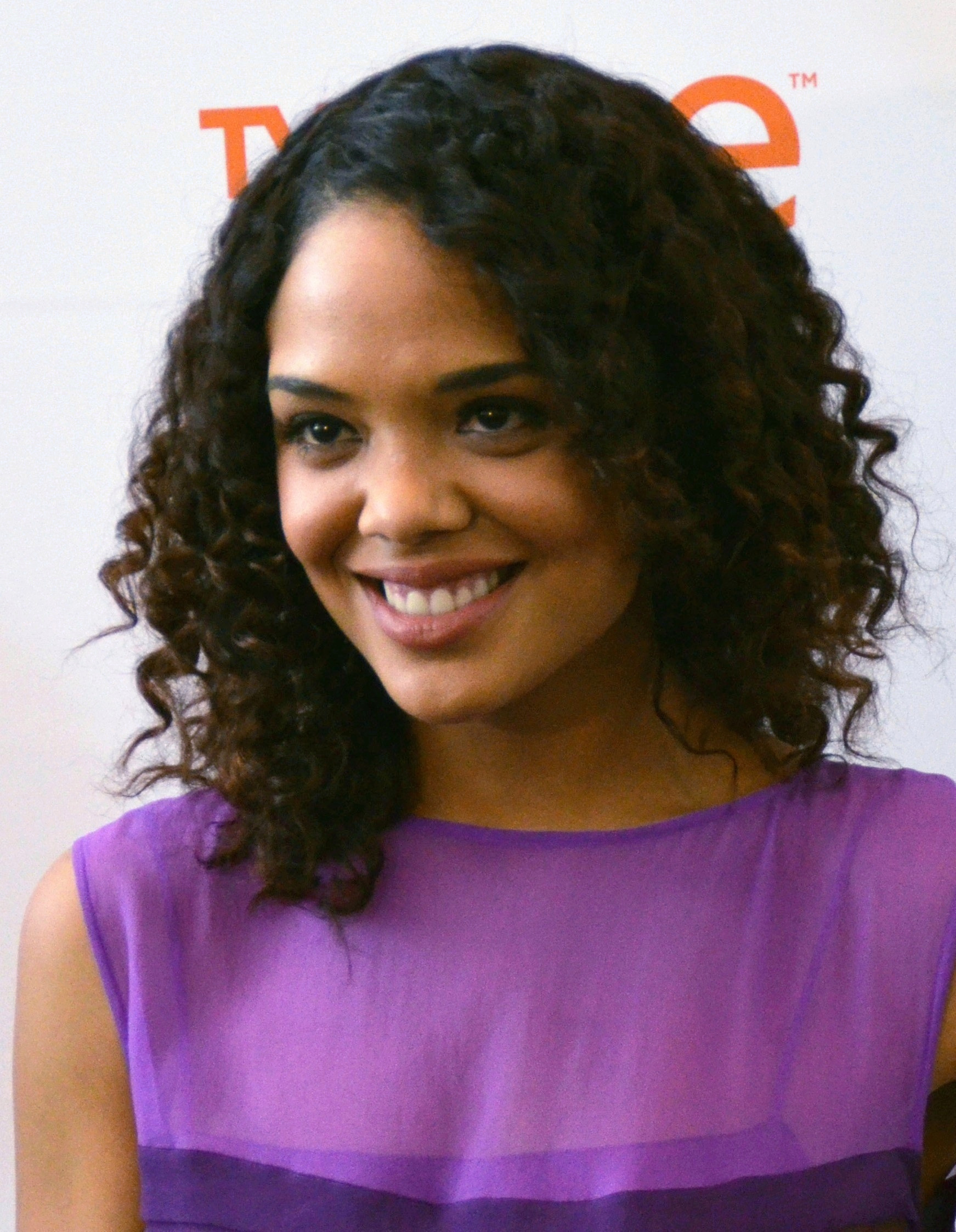
Thompson at the 46th NAACP Image Awards in 2014

In 2002, Thompson made her professional stage debut as one of three actors portraying the role of Ariel in LAWSC's production of The Tempest. In 2003, she appeared as Juliet in Romeo and Juliet: Antebellum New Orleans, 1836 with The Theatre @ Boston Court in Pasadena, California, which earned her an NAACP Theatre Award nomination. Thompson made her first television appearance in a 2005 episode of the CBS crime drama series Cold Case in the role of a lesbian bootlegger from the 1930s. In the same year, she rose to fame as she landed the role of Jackie Cook on the UPN/CW neo-noir drama series Veronica Mars, starring as a series regular in season two. In 2006, she appeared on the ABC medical drama series Grey's Anatomy.

Thompson's first feature film appearance was in the 2006 remake of the horror film When a Stranger Calls playing the role of Scarlett. In 2007, she was a part of the cast on the CW's short-lived drama Hidden Palms, portraying Nikki Barnes. She was next seen opposite Mary Elizabeth Winstead in the dance film Make it Happen in 2008. She worked on guest star roles on the television series Life and Private Practice, and appeared in season four of Heroes.

In 2010, Thompson appeared in Tyler Perry's stage play adaptation For Colored Girls, after she directly approached Perry to be cast in the film. Also in 2010, she had a guest role as the wife of a detective on the drama series Detroit 187. In 2010, Thompson also played Cordelia in King Lear at the Antaeus Theatre Company, where her other credits include Caesar and Cleopatra, Arcadia, and Twelfth Night. In 2012, Thompson had a guest role as Gavin Doran's daughter, Sasha, on the horror series 666 Park Avenue. Also in 2012, she starred as Rosalind in As You Like It for the Shakespeare Center of Los Angeles. In 2013, she starred in BBC America's first original series Copper.

=== 2014–2019: Breakthrough and acclaim ===
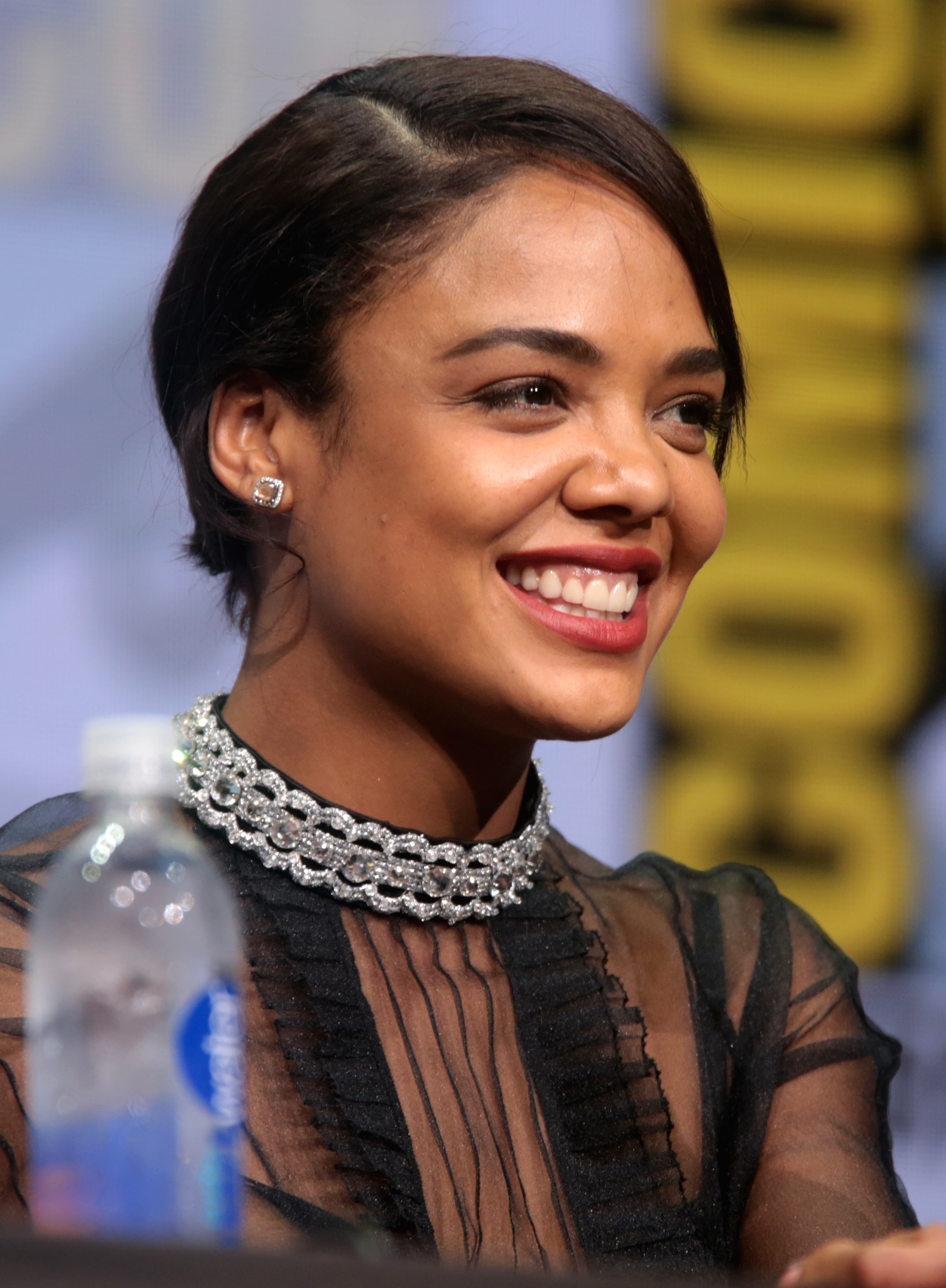
Thompson attending the 2017 San Diego Comic-Con

In 2014, she starred as Samantha White in Justin Simien's Sundance-winning comedy Dear White People. She earned praise for her leading role with Eric Kohn of IndieWire describing her as "ceaseless energetic". It was a breakout role for Thompson with her winning the Gotham Independent Film Award for Breakthrough Performer. That same year, Thompson played civil rights activist Diane Nash in Ava DuVernay's Martin Luther King Jr. biopic Selma. The following year, she co-starred as the romantic lead opposite Michael B. Jordan in Ryan Coogler's Rocky sports drama sequel film Creed (2015). Thompson portrayed Bianca Taylor a gifted singer suffering from hearing loss who falls for the boxer played by Jordan. Chris Klimek of NPR praised Thompson and her chemistry with Jordan describing her as being "great" and their relationship as being a "nicely slow-moving courtship". Stephanie Zacharek of Time concurred writing, "[Jordan]'s scenes with Thompson have a lovely, bantering lyricism". That same year she acted in Nate Ruess' short film The Grand Romantic. Peter Debruge also praised Thompson describing her as a "charismatic up-and-comer from such hyper-energetic films" and that the film "offered her a "chance to explore a quieter, more nuanced style of performance".

In 2016, she began a starring role in the HBO science fiction drama series Westworld as board director Charlotte Hale. Also in 2016, Thompson appeared in the off-Broadway run of the Lydia R. Diamond play Smart People at Second Stage Theatre, starring alongside Mahershala Ali, Joshua Jackson and Anne Son. David Rooney of The Hollywood Reporter praised her performance writing, that she "nails both the sardonic manner and the gnawing dissatisfaction of a character that wants both professional fulfillment and romantic connection but is unwilling to compromise who she is to get either." In April 2016, Thompson was cast as Valkyrie in the Marvel Cinematic Universe superhero film Thor: Ragnarok, which was released on November 3, 2017. Variety's Peter Debruge described her character as being a "sarcastic, Han Solo-like renegade".

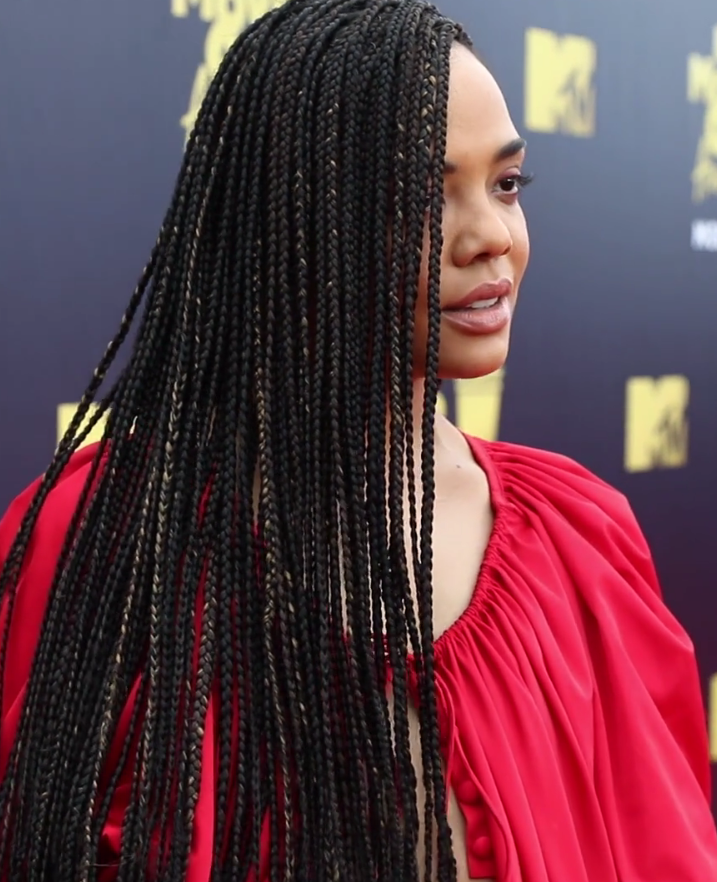
Thompson at the MTV Awards in 2018.

In June 2017, Thompson was cast as the romantic interest and artist opposite Lakeith Stanfield in the Boots Riley directed absurdist science fiction comedy Sorry to Bother You, which was released on July 6, 2018. She played a physicist in the Alex Garland directed science fiction horror film Annihilation, which was released on February 23, 2018. Thompson acted alongside Natalie Portman, Gina Rodriguez and Oscar Isaac. That same year, she also starred opposite Lily James in the crime drama Little Woods (2018), marking this Thompson's first collaboration with director Nia DaCosta. Thompson also served as the film's executive producer. The film premiered at the Tribeca Film Festival to positive reviews with John Defore highlighting her specifically writing that the film made for "a fine, tense vehicle for Tessa Thompson, who in the last few years has stood out in a variety of genres".

She reprised her role as Bianca Taylor in the sports drama sequel film Creed II, which was released on November 21, 2018, to positive reviews and strong box office returns. Thompson is a singer-songwriter who previously collaborated with the Los Angeles–based indie electro soul group, Caught a Ghost. She also made significant contributions to the soundtracks of Creed and Creed II by co-writing and performing multiple songs with producer Moses Sumney. Thompson reprised her role as Valkyrie in the superhero film Avengers: Endgame, which was released on April 26, 2019. She starred as Agent M in the Men in Black spin-off film, Men in Black: International, opposite Chris Hemsworth, her co-star from Thor: Ragnarok and Avengers: Endgame. The film was released on June 14, 2019. Also in 2019, she voiced Lady in the musical romance film Lady and the Tramp, a live-action adaptation of the 1955 film of the same name. At the 2019 San Diego Comic-Con, it was announced that Thompson would reprise her role as King Valkyrie "Val" in the superhero film Thor: Love and Thunder (2022), as a part of Phase Four of the Marvel Cinematic Universe.

=== 2020–present ===
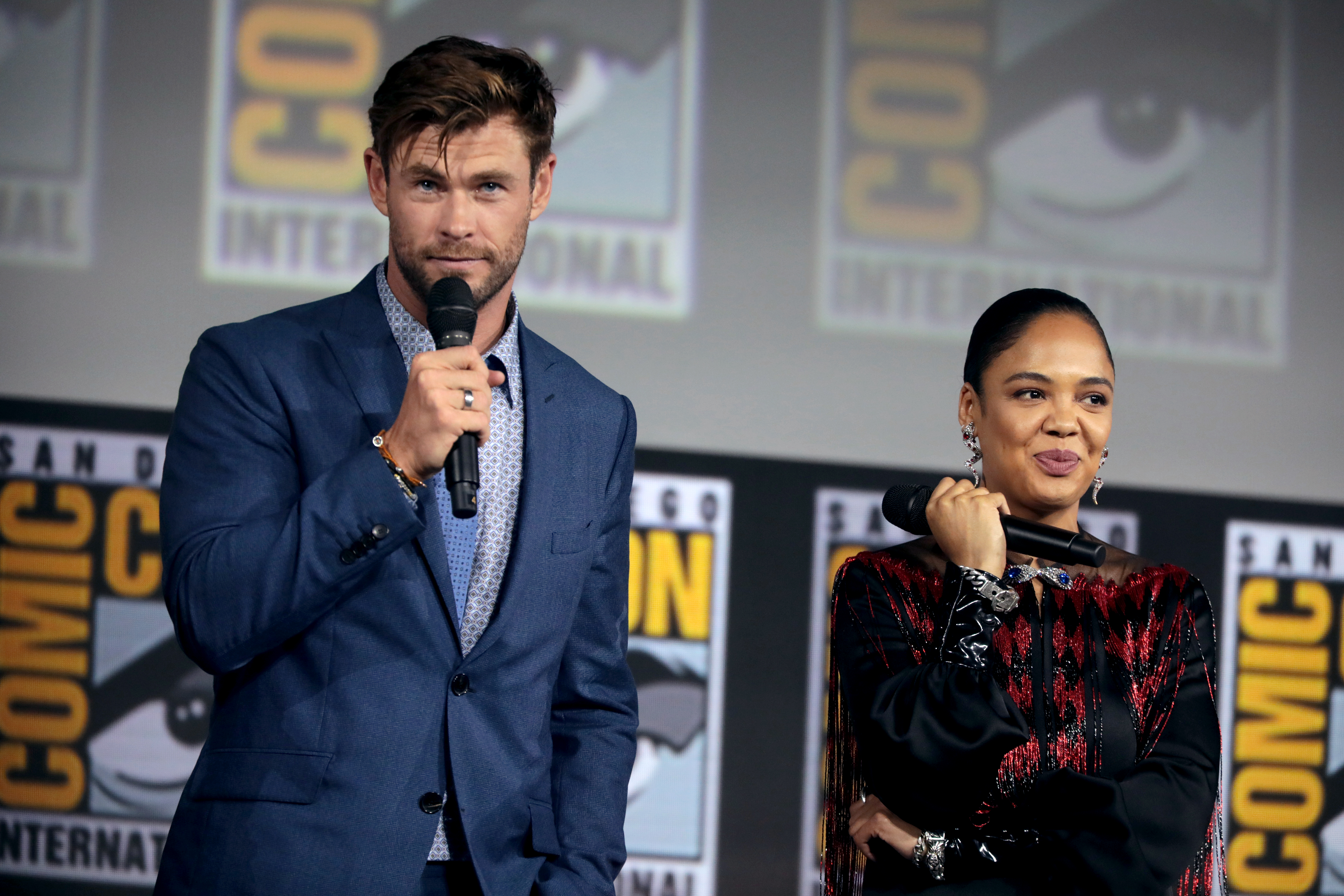
Chris Hemsworth with Thompson at San Diego Comic Con in 2019.

Thompson co-produced and voiced the lead role in the mystery sci-fi podcast series The Left Right Game, which was released in 2020. The audio drama series featured Thompson as a journalist who follows a story about a group of paranormal adventurers. Amazon Studios secured the screen rights to the series, with Thompson executive producing. That same year, she starred as the title character in the Amazon Prime Video romantic drama film Sylvie's Love (2020), which premiered at the Sundance Film Festival. Benjamin Lee of The Guardian praised Thompson writing, "[She] is on fine form here, managing to replicate the charm and style of a 50s matinee lead without her performance ever feeling like an overstudied bit. She radiates on screen, effortlessly switching from funny to vulnerable to feisty when required, the work of an actor in complete command of herself and her surroundings". For her performance she was nominated for the Critics' Choice Television Award for Best Actress in a Movie/Miniseries. She also served as the film's executive producer earning a nomination for the Primetime Emmy Award for Outstanding Television Movie.

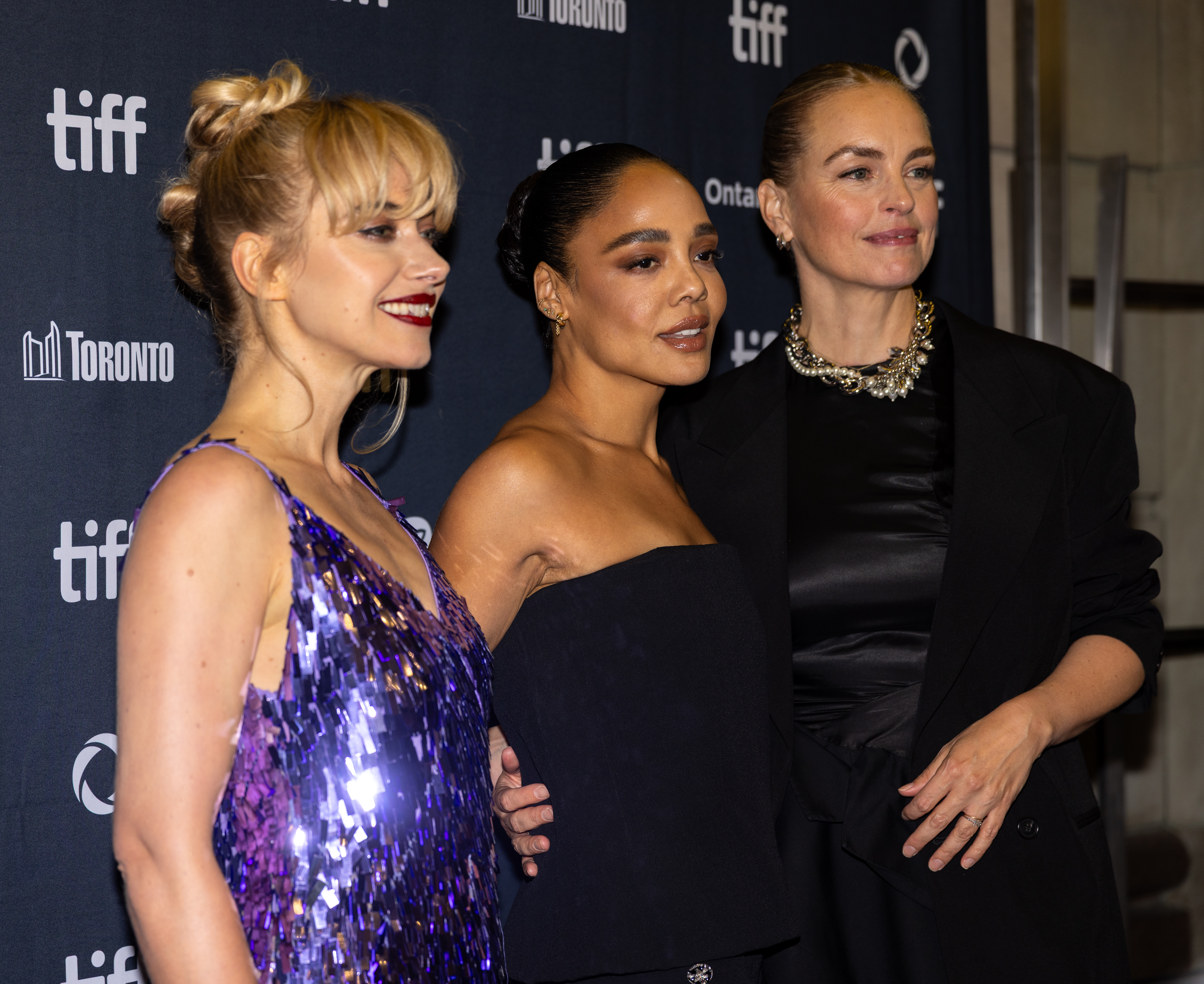
Imogen Poots, Thompson, and Nina Hoss at the premiere of Hedda at TIFF in 2025.

The following year she starred in Rebecca Hall's directorial debut film, the Netflix film Passing (2021), a drama set during the Harlem Renaissance. The film was adapted from the 1929 novel of the same name by Nella Larsen. Thompson played a light skinned black woman who reunites with a childhood friend Clare played by Ruth Negga. The film premiered at the Sundance Film Festival where it received positive reviews with David Rooney of The Hollywood Reporter praising Thompson citing her as having given an "unshowy, beautifully internalized performance". She was nominated for the BAFTA Award for Best Actress in a Leading Role. In January 2021, it was reported that her production company had signed a first look deal at HBO and would executive produce adaptations of two novels, Who Fears Death and The Secret Lives of Church Ladies.

In October 2021, Thompson wrapped production on drama film The Listener, directed by Steve Buscemi. Thompson has the only on-screen role in the film and served as one of the film's producers. In the film, Thompson portrayed a woman who takes calls for listeners to talk to. Leslie Felperin of The Hollywood Reporter wrote, "this spare, low-tech work mostly focuses on Thompson’s expressive face as she listens to calls for help from 10 very different people in distress". She reprised her role as Valkyrie in the Marvel Cinematic Universe superhero films Thor: Love and Thunder (2022) and The Marvels (2023). Thompson also reprised her role as Bianca Taylor in the sport drama sequel Creed III (2023). Thompson made her directorial debut with the music video for "Raat Ki Rani", the lead single of Arooj Aftab's 2024 album Night Reign.

She reunited with director Nia DaCosta in another Amazon Prime Video project this time playing the title role the drama film Hedda an adaptation of the Henrik Ibsen play Hedda Gabler. She also served as a producer on the film. The film premiered at the 2025 Toronto International Film Festival to positive reviews with a theatrical release in October 2025. Kate Erbland praised Thompson describing her as "magnetic" and "riveting in every moment". Jourdain Searles of The Hollywood Reporter praised the collaboration of DaCosta and Thompson writing, "Hedda is a delightful, sexy ride made that reminds us that Thompson is a star and DaCosta has many more tricks up her sleeve. It’s good to hear her unique narrative voice again." Thompson received the Gotham Film Award's 2025 Spirit Tribute Award and was also nominated for the Gotham Award for Outstanding Lead Performance and the Golden Globe Award for Best Actress in a Motion Picture – Drama. In April 2026, Thompson made her Broadway debut in the Lindsey Ferrentino play The Fear of 13 as prison volunteer Jacki, starring opposite Adrien Brody. In a review for The Guardian, Richard Lawson praised her performance in the show, noting her chemistry with Brody and the "warmth and understatement" she brought to the role.

== Personal life ==
Thompson told Net-A-Porter in June 2018 that she was "attracted to men and also to women", adding that she wanted "everyone else to have that freedom and support that I have from my loved ones." She also stated that she and Janelle Monáe loved each other "deeply" and were so close that they "vibrate on the same frequency", but clarified that "if people want to speculate about what we are, that's okay. It doesn't bother me." She further noted that her family supports her sexuality, saying that "if I bring a woman home, [or] a man, we don't even have to have the discussion." In November 2018, she later told The Independent that she was only speaking candidly, and did not use binary words to describe her identity, like the word bisexual, but added that she was "lucky to have a family where you can be whatever you want to be" while other people do not have that support system and cannot love other people "in the way they wanna love [and] be who they wanna be".

Thompson has the word "yes" tattooed on one of her arms, and the word "no" tattooed on her other arm.

== Acting credits ==
=== Film ===
Year	Title	Role	Notes	Ref.
2006	When a Stranger Calls	Scarlet		
2008	Make It Happen	Dana		
2008	The Human Contract	Waitress		
2009	Mississippi Damned	Kari Peterson		
2010	Everyday Black Man	Claire		
2010	Exquisite Corpse	Liz		
2010	For Colored Girls	Nyla Adrose		
2011	Periphery	Caitlin		
2011	Red & Blue Marbles	Becca		
2012	Murder on the 13th Floor	Nia Palmer		
2013	Automotive	Maggie		
2014	Dear White People	Samantha "Sam" White		
2014	Grantham & Rose	Wallis	Also associate producer	
2014	Points of Origin	Rosemary	Short film	
2014	Selma	Diane Nash		
2015	The Grand Romantic	Cindy	Short film	
2015	Creed	Bianca Taylor	Also songwriter	
2016	War on Everyone	Jackie Hollis		
2016	Salt Water	Brit		
2017	South Dakota	Chris		
2017	Thor: Ragnarok	Valkyrie / Scrapper 142		
2018	Sorry to Bother You	Detroit		
2018	Annihilation	Josie Radek		
2018	Furlough	Nicole Stevens		
2018	Little Woods	Oleander "Ollie" Hale	Also executive producer	
2018	Dirty Computer	Zen / Mary Apple 53	Short film	
2018	Creed II	Bianca Taylor	Also songwriter	
2019	Brave Girl Rising	Nasro	Short film; voice role	
2019	Avengers: Endgame	Valkyrie		
2019	Men in Black: International	Molly Wright / Agent M		
2019	Between Two Ferns: The Movie	Herself		
2019	Lady and the Tramp	Lady (voice)		
2020	Sylvie's Love	Sylvie Parker	Also executive producer	
2021	Passing	Irene Redfield		
2022	Thor: Love and Thunder	King Valkyrie "Val"		
2022	The Listener	Beth	Also producer	
2023	Creed III	Bianca Taylor		
2023	The Marvels	King Valkyrie "Val"		
2025	Hedda	Hedda Gabler	Also producer	
2026	Is God Is	—N/a	Producer	
TBA	Foxfinder	TBA	Filming	

=== Television ===
Year	Title	Role	Notes	Ref.
2005	Cold Case	Wilhelmina "Billie" Doucette	Episode: "Best Friends"	
2005–2006	Veronica Mars	Jackie Cook	Main role	
2006	Grey's Anatomy	Camille Travis	2 episodes	
2006	The Initiation of Sarah	Esme	Television film	
2007	Hidden Palms	Nikki Barnes	Main role	
2008	Life	Liza	Episode: "Trapdoor"	
2009	Mental	Lainey Jefferson	Episode: "Lines in the Sand"	
2009	Private Practice	Zoe	2 episodes	
2009	Heroes	Rebecca Taylor	3 episodes	
2009	Three Rivers	Penelope Kirkell	Episode: "A Roll of the Dice"	
2010	Betwixt	Jenny	Television pilot	
2010	Blue Belle	Blue	Lead role	
2010–2011	Detroit 1-8-7	Lauren Washington	3 episodes	
2011	Off the Map	Sydney	Episode: "A Doctor Time Out"	
2011	Rizzoli & Isles	FBI Agent Anna Farrell	Episode: "He Ain't Heavy, He's My Brother"	
2012–2013	666 Park Avenue	Laurel Harris / Sasha Doran	Recurring role, 5 episodes	
2012–2013	Copper	Sara Freeman	Main role	
2016	BoJack Horseman	Tanisha	Voice role; episode: "Love And/Or Marriage"	
2016–2022	Westworld	Charlotte Hale / Dolores Abernathy	Main role	
2018	Portlandia	Bailey	Episode: "Rose Route"	
2018	Dear White People	Rikki Carter	2 episodes	
2019	Tuca & Bertie	Sophie Black	Voice role; episode: "The Sex Bugs"	
2019	Drunk History	Eartha Kitt	Episode: "Fame"	
2020	RuPaul's Drag Race All Stars	Herself	Episode: "I'm In Love!"	
2022	Marvel Studios: Assembled	Herself	Episode: "The Making of Thor: Love and Thunder "	
2023–2024	What If...?	Valkyrie	Voice role; 2 episodes	
2025	Marvel Zombies	Valkyrie	Voice role; 2 episodes	
2026	His & Hers	Anna Andrews	6 episodes; also executive producer	

=== Theater ===
Year	Title	Role	Venue	Notes	Ref.
2010	King Lear	Cordelia	Antaeus Theatre Company		
2011	Blues for an Alabama Sky	Delia	Pasadena Playhouse		
2012	As You Like It	Rosalind	Shakespeare Center of Los Angeles		
2016	Smart People	Valerie	Second Stage Theater	Off-Broadway	
2026	The Fear of 13	Jacki Miles	James Earl Jones Theater	Broadway	

=== Music videos ===
Year	Song	Artist	Role	Ref.
2015	"Yoga"	Janelle Monáe	Dancer	
2017	"Moonlight"	Jay-Z	Monica Geller	
2018	"Make Me Feel"	Janelle Monáe	Zen / Mary Apple 53	
2018	"Pynk"	Janelle Monáe	Zen / Mary Apple 53	
2019	"Screwed"	Janelle Monáe	Zen / Mary Apple 53	
2019	"Uneventful Days"	Beck	Herself	

=== Podcasts ===
Year	Title	Role	Notes	Ref.
2020	The Left Right Game	Alice Sharman	Also Producer	
