= Nia DaCosta =

American filmmaker (born 1989)

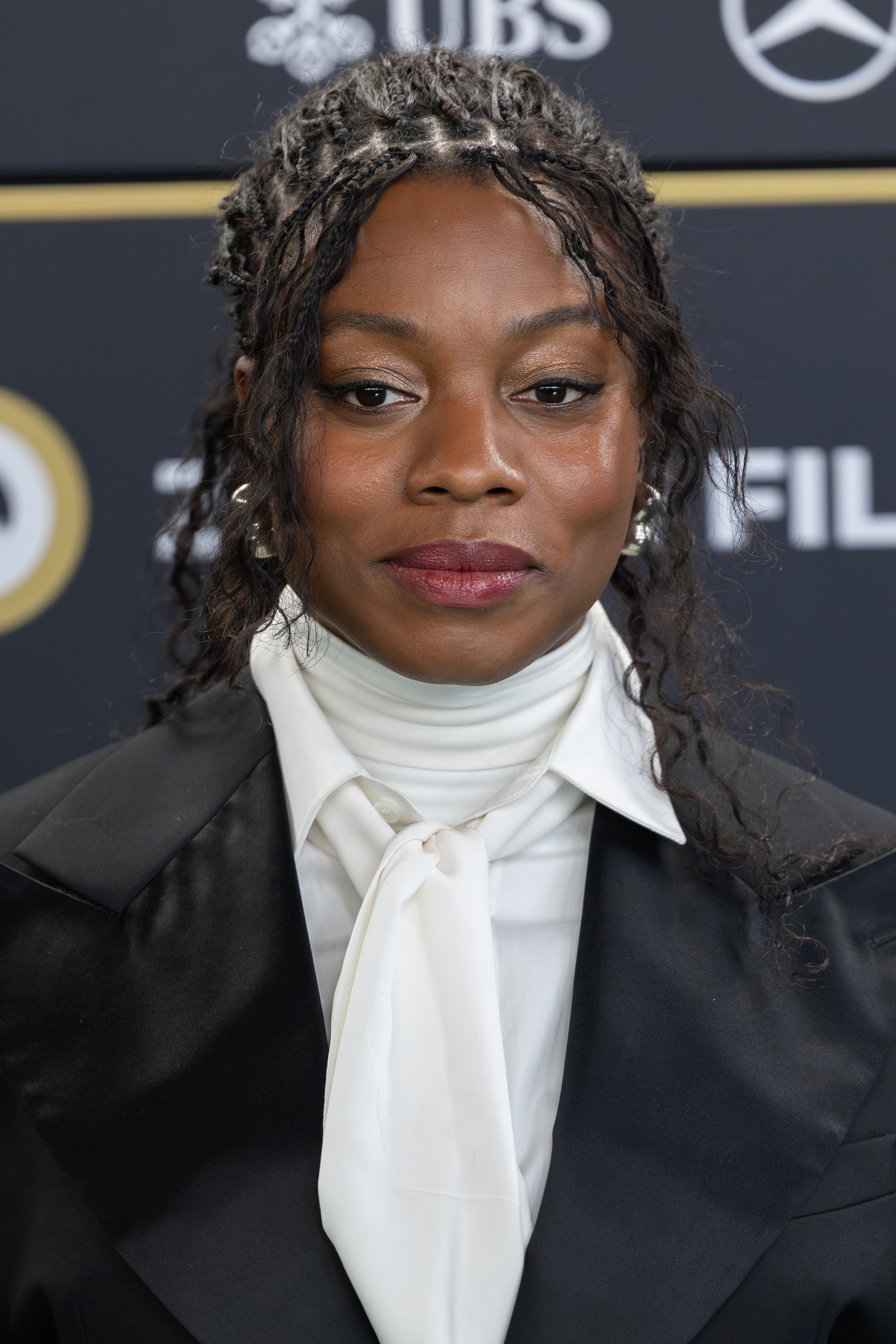
- DaCosta at the 2025 Zurich Film Festival
- Born: November 8, 1989 (age 36); New York City, New York, U.S.
- Education: New York University (BFA); Royal Central School of Speech and Drama (MA)
- Occupation: Filmmaker
- Years active: 2009–present

Nia DaCosta (born November 8, 1989) is an American filmmaker. She rose to prominence when she made her feature film debut with the crime drama film Little Woods (2018), which earned her a nomination for the American Independent Award for Best Feature Film at the Denver Film Festival and won the Nora Ephron Award at the Tribeca Film Festival.

After directing two episodes of the crime thriller drama series Top Boy (2019), DaCosta became the first Black female director to debut at No. 1 at the U.S. box office for the weekend opening of the supernatural horror film Candyman (2021). She then became the first Black woman to direct a Marvel Comics film with The Marvels (2023), which became the highest-grossing film directed by a Black woman. DaCosta has since directed films including Hedda (2025) and 28 Years Later: The Bone Temple (2026).

== Early life and education ==
Nia DaCosta was born in the Brooklyn borough of New York City on November 8, 1989, and grew up in Harlem. Her Jamaican mother, Charmaine DaCosta, was a founding vocalist of the band Worl-A-Girl. Her original aspiration was to become a poet. When she was 16 years old, she took an A.P. English class, where she was exposed to the work of Joseph Conrad upon reading his book Heart of Darkness. She became obsessed with films after watching Apocalypse Now, which led her to study cinema from the New Hollywood era, finding inspiration in directors such as Francis Ford Coppola, Sidney Lumet, Martin Scorsese, and Steven Spielberg. Citing Scorsese in particular as her primary influence, she enrolled at New York University's Tisch School of the Arts and graduated in 2011. While there, she met Scorsese during her work as a television production assistant. She later earned an MA in Writing for Stage and Broadcast Media from London's Royal Central School of Speech and Drama.

== Career ==
=== 2009–2017 ===
After finishing school, DaCosta began working as a television production assistant, for filmmakers such as Scorsese, Steve McQueen, and Steven Soderbergh. DaCosta worked as a crew member on productions like Shark Loves the Amazon (2011), I Love the 1880s (2012) and Kesha: My Crazy Beautiful Life (2013). After working as a crew member on sets, she began writing short films like Livelihood and Celeste (both 2014). Soon DaCosta wrote the script for Little Woods. It was one of the 12 projects chosen for the 2015 Sundance Screenwriters and Directors Labs. There she became friends with Tessa Thompson, who would be cast in the role of Ollie. She funded a short film version of what would eventually become her first feature film released through Neon and Kickstarter with the help of 72 backers, who eventually raised $5,100.

Little Woods premiered at the Tribeca Film Festival in 2018, and was given the Nora Ephron award for "excellence in storytelling by a female writer or director". The film's distribution rights were bought by Neon and was released in theaters in the United States on April 19, 2019. Its production took place in the winter of 2017 and 2018, in North Dakota and Austin, Texas. Filming occurred over January and February when the weather was "extreme". DaCosta further remarked on the production aspect of the film, "It's very difficult for a woman to just pop up in the studio system. But I think the same systemic issues that affect how much work women get to make is also inside the indie space. While there are more women working, we definitely get less money". DaCosta cites Debra Granik's Winter's Bone and Courtney Hunt's Frozen River as sources of inspiration for her script. She related the importance to her of telling stories of "women who are active" rather than passive figures in movies led by men. Little Woods, inspired by the political debates around the Affordable Care Act in 2014, explored the, "actual lives," of women facing immense obstacles to basic healthcare, a theme she explored in the fictional town of Little Woods.

After finishing Little Woods, DaCosta directed two episodes of the third season of the British crime-drama Top Boy. DaCosta became a co-creator, alongside Aron Eli Coleite, when she worked on an 8-episode web series called Ghost Tape (2020). Afterward, DaCosta fulfilled a dream of hers when she began working with Jordan Peele, who later became her mentor, while working on the 2021 film Candyman.

=== 2018–2023 ===
DaCosta was chosen to helm what was described as a spiritual sequel to the original Candyman (1992) in 2018. The film returned to the Chicago neighborhood of the first film. The film was produced by Jordan Peele through Monkeypaw Productions, with Peele citing the original as "a landmark film for Black representation in the horror genre". DaCosta explains that for Candyman, it was much easier to tell the story because the people to experience these issues are the ones sharing the story. Yahya Abdul-Mateen II starred in the film, with Tony Todd returning as the film's titular villain, and Teyonah Parris, and Nathan Stewart-Jarrett co-starring. Production began in the spring of 2019, and wrapped the following September. The original teaser trailer was released on June 17, 2021. Universal Pictures released the film theatrically on August 27, 2021, and received positive reviews. DaCosta was intent on not depicting the everyday horrors committed against Black people. Her priority was to inflict psychological terror and steer clear of current event depictions. Candyman (2021) was set to be released during the Black Lives Matter movement. While working on Top Boy in London she learned that she was on Peele's shortlist to direct the film, and she became the first Black female director to have a film debut at the top of the box office.

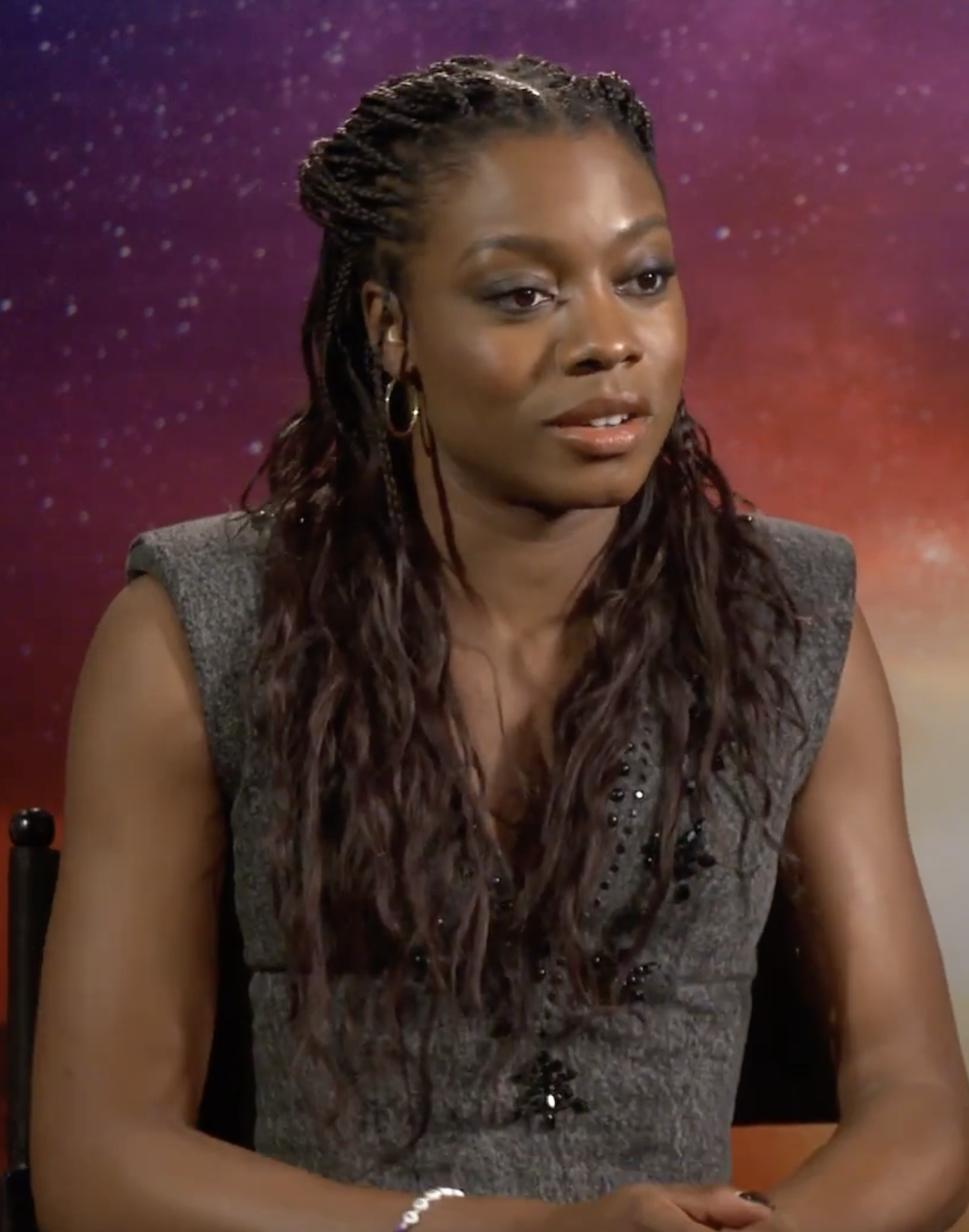
DaCosta in 2023

In August 2020, DaCosta was hired to direct the Marvel Studios film The Marvels, the sequel to Captain Marvel (2019), after having initially approached them with a Fantastic Four / X-Men crossover movie. It was released on November 10, 2023. She is the fourth woman to direct a Marvel film behind Anna Boden, Cate Shortland, and Chloé Zhao. She is the youngest director and first African American woman to have directed a Marvel film.

The Marvels debuted to $46.1 million, topping the box office and marking the best opening figure ever for a black female director, but also marked the lowest opening weekend total ever for an MCU film. It is the first box-office bomb and the lowest-grossing film of the MCU franchise, falling short of an estimated break-even point of $439.6 million. Deadline Hollywood calculated the net losses of the film to be $237 million, when factoring together expenses and revenues. Despite this, it surpassed A Wrinkle in Time (2018) to become the highest-grossing film directed by a Black woman. The film received mixed reviews. Abby Olcese, for Paste, thought that "DaCosta's assured, efficient direction" was an example of what the MCU could have been if the franchise "hadn't gotten bogged down by gloopy effects and overblown lore". In contrast, James Mottram of NME felt that the film "never musters the same level of engagement" as DaCosta's Candyman even with "a script that is chock full of good lines and a cast of willing participants".

=== 2024–present ===
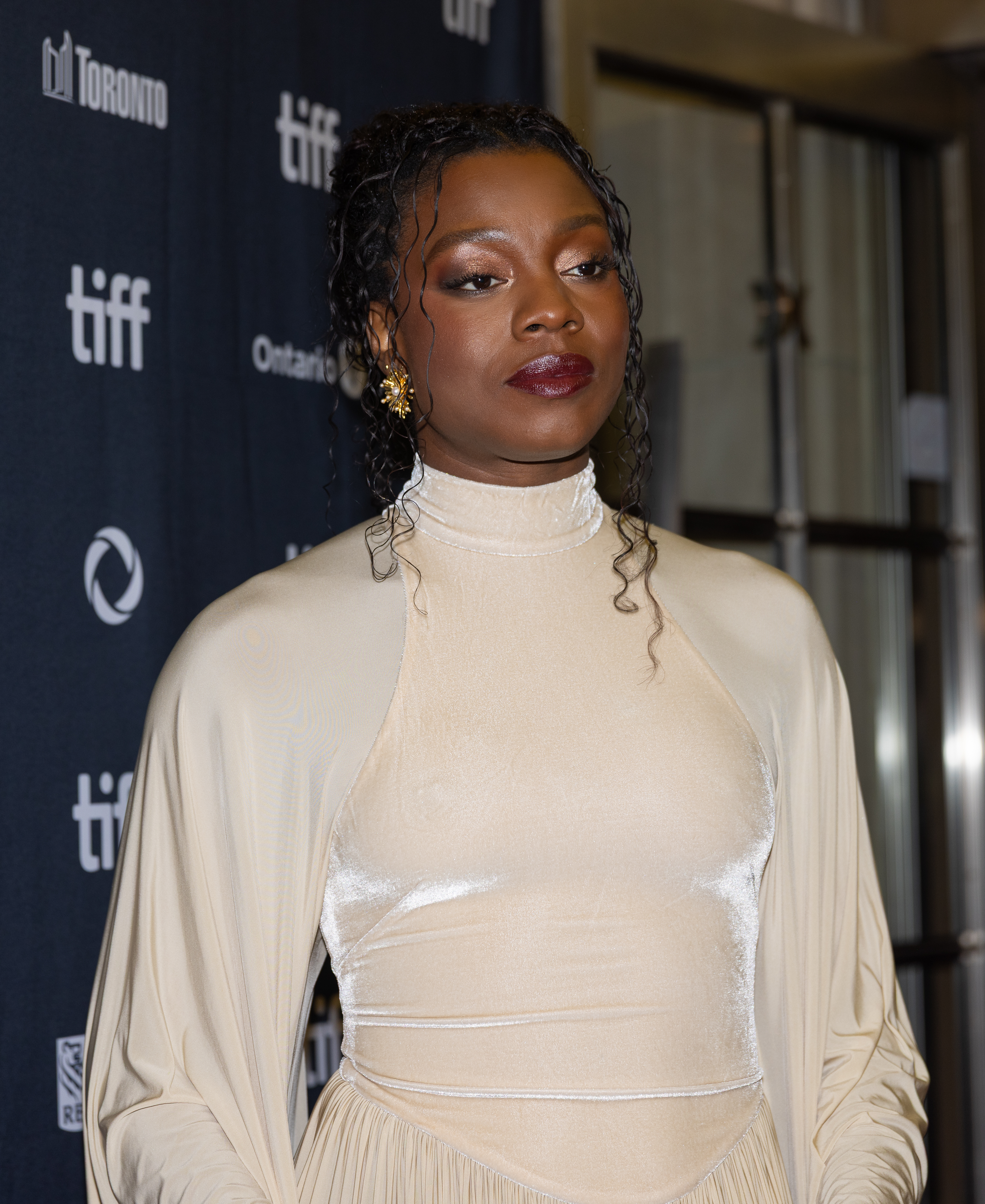
DaCosta in 2025

DaCosta wrote and directed Hedda, an adaptation of Henrik Ibsen’s 1891 play Hedda Gabler. The film reunited her with Tessa Thompson, who plays the title character and co-produced, and was released in October 2025 through Amazon MGM Studios. Additionally, DaCosta was hired to direct 28 Years Later: The Bone Temple, which is part of the 28 Days Later film series. The film was released in January 2026. DaCosta commented that "making the 28 Years Later sequel was one of the best filmmaking experiences I've had. One of the issues I had with Candyman and Marvels was the lack of a really solid script, which is always gonna just wreak havoc on the whole process". She called Alex Garland's script "amazing" and that her main change was asking "for more infected".

== Filmography ==
Short film

Year	Title	Director	Writer	Producer	Notes
2009	The Black Girl Dies Last	Yes	Yes	No	Also actor
2013	Night and Day	Yes	No	Yes	Also editor
2014	Celeste	No	Yes	No	
2014	Livelihood	No	Yes	No	

Feature film

Year	Title	Director	Writer	Producer
2018	Little Woods	Yes	Yes	No
2021	Candyman	Yes	Yes	No
2023	The Marvels	Yes	Yes	No
2025	Hedda	Yes	Yes	Yes
2026	28 Years Later: The Bone Temple	Yes	No	No

Television

Year	Title	Notes
2019	Top Boy	Episodes "Bonfire Night" and "Smoke Gets in Your Hands"
2022	Ms. Marvel	Episode "No Normal"; mid-credits scene

Theme park attraction

- Avengers: Quantum Encounter (2022)

== Awards and nominations ==
DaCosta was the first black female director to debut a film at number one at the American box office, for Candyman. Her first film, Little Woods, received the Nora Ephron Prize at the Tribeca Film Festival for "excellence in storytelling by a female writer or director." The film also won Best Narrative Feature and Best Director at the 19th Fargo Film Festival. She also received nominations for her film Candyman for "Most Anticipated Film for the Rest of 2021" at the 2021 Hollywood Critics Association, and won the awards for "Directors to Watch", and "Best Horror Film" respectively. With her directorial work in Candyman, DaCosta received her first nomination at the 53rd NAACP Image Awards for Outstanding Writing in a Motion Picture, and at the Black Reel and Awards for Outstanding Director and Outstanding Screenplay, Adapted or Original.

In 2025, she was honored at the 20th Rome Film Festival with Progressive Lifetime Achievement Award. She was also honored at the 2026 Sundance Film Festival with the Vanguard Award for Fiction. At the 51st annual Gracie Awards, she won "Director – Drama Feature Film" for her work on Hedda (2025).
