= Hedda Gabler =

1891 play by Henrik Ibsen

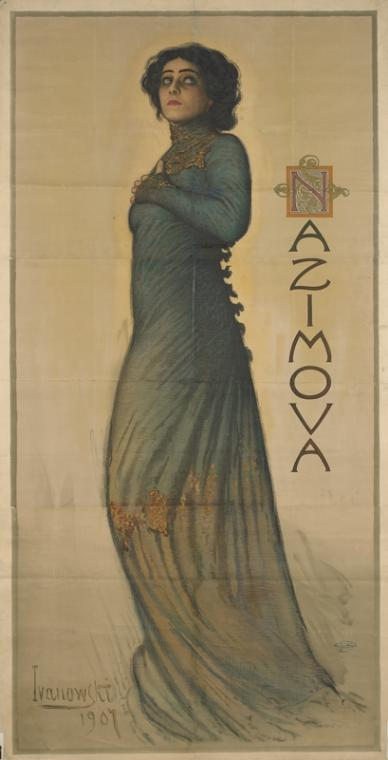
- Poster of Alla Nazimova as Hedda Gabler (Sigismund Ivanowski, 1907)
- Original language: Danish
- Written by: Henrik Ibsen
- Subject: A newlywed struggles with an existence she finds devoid of excitement and enchantment
- Genre: Tragedy
- Setting: Jørgen Tesman's villa, Kristiania, Norway; 1890s

Premiere
- Date: 1891
- Place: Königliches Residenz-Theater; Munich, Germany

Hedda Gabler (Norwegian pronunciation: [ˈhɛ̂dːɑ ˈɡɑ̀ːblər]) is a play written by Norwegian playwright Henrik Ibsen. The world premiere was staged on 31 January 1891 at the Residenztheater in Munich. Ibsen himself was in attendance, although he remained back-stage. Though initial reviews were negative, it has since been canonized as a masterpiece of literary realism, 19th-century theatre, and world drama in general.

Hedda Gabler dramatizes the experiences of the title character, Hedda, the daughter of a general, who is trapped in a marriage and a house that she does not want. Hedda is considered one of the great dramatic roles in theatre, and has been described as a female variation of Hamlet.

Hedda's married name is Hedda Tesman; Gabler is her maiden name. On the subject of the title, Ibsen wrote: "My intention in giving it this name was to indicate that Hedda as a personality is to be regarded rather as her father's daughter than her husband's wife."

== Characters ==
- Hedda Tesman (née Gabler) — The main character, newly married and bored with both her marriage and life, seeks to influence a human fate for the first time. She is the daughter of General Gabler. She wants luxury and amusement but has no funds.
- George (Jørgen) Tesman — Hedda's husband, an academic who is as interested in research and travel as he is enamoured with his wife, although blind to Hedda's manipulative ways. Despite George's presumed rivalry with Eilert over Hedda, he remains a congenial and compassionate host and even plans to return Eilert's manuscript after Eilert loses it while drunk.
- Juliana (Juliane) Tesman — George's loving aunt who has raised him since early childhood. She is also called Aunt Julle in the play, and Aunt Ju-Ju by George. Desperately wants Hedda and her nephew to have a child. In an earlier draft, Ibsen named her Mariane Rising, clearly after his aunt (father's younger half-sister) and godmother Mariane Paus who grew up (with Ibsen's father) on the stately farm Rising near Skien; while she was later renamed Juliane Tesman, her character was modeled after Mariane Paus.
- Thea Elvsted — A younger schoolmate of Hedda and a former acquaintance of George. Nervous and shy, Thea is in an unhappy marriage.
- Judge Brack — An unscrupulous family friend. It is implied that the Judge has a lascivious personality, which he directs towards Hedda.
- Eilert Lövborg (Ejlert Løvborg) — George's former colleague, who now competes with George to achieve publication and a Professorship. Eilert was once in love with Hedda. Destroyed his reputation in society by spending his money on a lifestyle of depravity.
- Bertha (Berte) — A servant of the Tesmans. Wants to please Hedda at all times.

== Plot ==
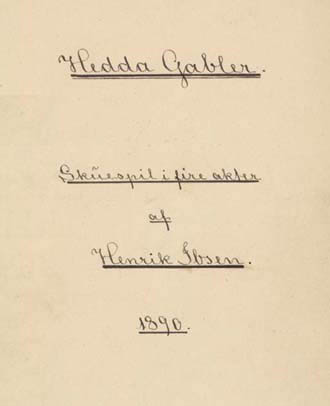
Title page of the author's 1890 manuscript of Hedda Gabler

Hedda, the daughter of a general, has just returned to her villa in Kristiania (now Oslo) from her honeymoon. Her husband is George Tesman, a young, aspiring, and serious academic who continued his research during their honeymoon. It becomes clear in the course of the play that she never loved him, but married him probably because she thinks her years of youthful abandon are over.

The reappearance of George's academic rival, Eilert Løvborg, throws their lives into disarray. Eilert, a writer, is a recovering alcoholic who has wasted his talent until now. Thanks to a relationship with Hedda's old schoolmate, Thea Elvsted (who is in the process of leaving her husband for him), Eilert is showing signs of rehabilitation (for example refusing alcohol) and has just published a bestseller in the same field as George's. When Hedda and Eilert talk privately together, it becomes apparent that they are former lovers.

The critical success of his recently published work makes Eilert a threat to George, as Eilert is now a competitor for the university professorship George had been hoping for and anticipating. George and Hedda are financially overstretched, and George tells Hedda that he will not be able to finance the regular entertaining or luxurious housekeeping that she had been expecting. Upon meeting Eilert, however, the couple discovers that he has no intention of competing for the professorship, but rather has spent the last few years working on what he considers to be his masterpiece, the "sequel" to his recently published work.

Apparently jealous of Thea's influence over Eilert, Hedda hopes to come between them. Despite his previous drinking problem, she encourages Eilert to accompany George and his associate, Judge Brack, to a party, which promises to be raucous. George returns home from the party at dawn the following day and reveals that he found the manuscript (the only copy) of Eilert's great new work, which the latter lost while drunk. George is then called away to his aunt's house, leaving the manuscript in Hedda's possession. When Eilert next sees Hedda and Thea, he tells them that he has lost the manuscript. Thea is horrified, and it is revealed that she had considerable influence in its development. Hedda says nothing to contradict Eilert or to reassure Thea. After Thea has left, Hedda encourages Eilert to commit suicide, giving him a pistol that had belonged to her father. She then burns the manuscript and tells George she has destroyed it to secure their future. George is momentarily horrified.

Almost immediately the news comes that Eilert has killed himself after the party, and George and Thea are determined to try to reconstruct his unpublished new book from Eilert's notes, which Thea has kept. Hedda is shocked to discover from Judge Brack that Eilert's death, apparently in a brothel, was messy and probably accidental; this "ridiculous and vile" death contrasts with the "beautiful and free" one that Hedda had imagined for him (and asked him to ensure). Worse, Brack knows the origins of the pistol. He tells Hedda that if he reveals what he knows, a scandal will likely arise around her. Hedda realises that this places Brack in a position of continuous power over her, which he implies he will use to coerce her, possibly into a sexual relationship. Leaving the others, she goes into her smaller room and then shoots herself in the head with her other pistol. The others in the room assume that Hedda is simply firing shots, and they follow the sound to investigate. The play ends with George, Brack and Thea discovering the body, where Brack exclaims "But people do not do such things!"

== Critical interpretation ==
Joseph Wood Krutch makes a connection between Hedda Gabler and Freud, whose first work on psychoanalysis was published almost a decade later. In Krutch's analysis, Gabler is one of the first fully developed neurotic female protagonists of literature. By that, Krutch means that Hedda is neither logical nor is she insane in the old sense of being random and unaccountable. Her aims and her motives have a secret personal logic of their own. She gets what she wants, but what she wants is not anything that normal people would acknowledge (at least, not publicly) to be desirable. One of the significant things that such a character implies is the premise that there is a secret, sometimes unconscious, world of aims and methods — one might almost say a secret system of values — that is often much more important than the rational one. It is regarded as a deep and emotional play, due to Ibsen's portrayal of an anti-heroine.

Ibsen was interested in the then-embryonic science of mental illness which the world had a poor understanding of by present-day standards. His play Ghosts is another example of this. Examples of the troubled 19th-century female might include oppressed, but "normal", willful, characters; women in abusive or loveless relationships; and those with some type of organic brain disease. Ibsen is content to leave such explanations unsettled. Bernard Paris interprets Gabler's actions as stemming from her "need for freedom [which is] as compensatory as her craving for power... her desire to shape a man's destiny."

== Productions ==
The play was performed in Munich at the Königliches Residenz-Theater on 31 January 1891, with Clara Heese as Hedda, though Ibsen was said to be displeased with the declamatory style of her performance. Ibsen's work had an international following so that translations and productions in various countries appeared very soon after the publication in Copenhagen and the premiere in Munich. In February 1891 there were productions in Berlin and Copenhagen. On 20 April 1891, the first British performance of the play occurred, at the Vaudeville Theatre, London, starring Elizabeth Robins, who directed it with Marion Lea, who played Thea. Robins also played Hedda in the first US production, which opened on 30 March 1898 at the Fifth Avenue Theatre, New York City. In February 1899 it was produced as part of The Moscow Art Theatre's first season with Maria F. Andreeva as Hedda.

A 1902 production starring Minnie Maddern Fiske was a major sensation on Broadway, and following its initial limited run was revived with the same actress the next year.

Many prominent actresses have played the role of Hedda, including Vera Komissarzhevskaya, Eleonora Duse, Alla Nazimova, Asta Nielsen, Johanne Louise Schmidt, Mrs. Patrick Campbell, Eva Le Gallienne, Elizabeth Robins, Anne Meacham, Ingrid Bergman, Peggy Ashcroft, Fenella Fielding, Jill Bennett, Janet Suzman, Diana Rigg, Glenda Jackson, Isabelle Huppert, Claire Bloom, June Brown, Kate Burton, Geraldine James, Kate Mulgrew, Kelly McGillis, Fiona Shaw, Maggie Smith, Jane Fonda, Annette Bening, Amanda Donohoe, Judy Davis, Emmanuelle Seigner, Mary-Louise Parker, Harriet Walter, Rosamund Pike, Ruth Wilson, Cate Blanchett and Katie Holmes.

In 1970 the Royal National Theatre in London staged a production of the play directed by Ingmar Bergman, starring Maggie Smith, who gained much critical acclaim and won a Best Actress Evening Standard Theatre Award for her performance. Also in the early 1970s, Irene Worth played Hedda at Stratford, Ontario, prompting New York Times critic Walter Kerr to write, "Miss Worth is just possibly the best actress in the world."

A 1973/4 Royal Shakespeare Company world tour of the play was directed and translated by Trevor Nunn, and starred Pam St Clement as Bertha, Patrick Stewart as Eilert Lovborg, Peter Eyre as George Tesman, Glenda Jackson as Hedda Tesman, Timothy West as Judge Brack, Constance Chapman as Juliana Tesman, and Jennie Linden as Mrs. Elvsted.

British playwright John Osborne prepared an adaptation in 1972, and in 1991 the Canadian playwright Judith Thompson presented her version at the Shaw Festival. Thompson adapted the play a second time in 2005 at Buddies in Bad Times Theatre in Toronto, setting the first half of the play in the nineteenth century, and the second half during the present day. Early in 2006, the play gained critical success at the West Yorkshire Playhouse in Leeds and the Liverpool Playhouse, directed by Matthew Lloyd with Gillian Kearney in the lead role. A revival opened in January 2009 on Broadway, starring Mary-Louise Parker as the title character and Michael Cerveris as Jørgen Tesman, at the American Airlines Theatre, to mixed critical reviews.

In 2005, a production by Richard Eyre, starring Eve Best, at the Almeida Theatre in London was well-received and later transferred for an 11½ week run at the Duke of York's on St Martin's Lane. The play was staged at Chicago's Steppenwolf Theater starring actress Martha Plimpton.

In April 2009, a modernized New Zealand adaptation by The Wild Duck starring Clare Kerrison in the title role, opened at BATS Theatre in Wellington. It was lauded as "extraordinarily accessible without compromising Ibsen's genius at all."

In 2010, Hedda Gabler was performed at the Theatre Royal in Bath, directed by Adrian Noble. The production starred Rosamund Pike as Hedda, earning praise for her "compelling and multifaceted performance, which highlighted both the vulnerability and manipulative strength of Ibsen's iconic character."

In 2011, the performance of a production of the play as translated and directed by Vahid Rahbani was stopped in Tehran, Iran. Rahbani was summoned to court for inquiry after an Iranian news agency blasted the classic drama in a review and described it as "vulgar" and "hedonistic" with symbols of a "sexual slavery cult."

In February 2011, a Serbian production premiered at the National Theatre in Belgrade.

A 2012 Brian Friel adaptation of the play staged at London's The Old Vic theatre received mixed reviews, especially for Sheridan Smith in the lead role.

In 2012, Hedda Gabler was staged at the Royal and Derngate Theatre in Northampton, directed by Jonathan Munby. The production featured Emma Hamilton in the title role, with her performance receiving attention for its "emotional depth and complexity, capturing the struggle of Ibsen's protagonist."

In 2015, Hedda Gabler was staged at the Taras Shevchenko Dnipro National Academic Ukrainian Music and Drama Theatre in Ukraine. The production was directed by Diana Stein, with Nataliya Tafi in the title role.

The play was staged in 2015 at Madrid's María Guerrero. The production, which received mixed reviews, was directed by Eduardo Vasco and presented a text that was adapted by the Spanish playwright Yolanda Pallín with Cayetana Guillén Cuervo playing the lead role.

In 2016, Tony Award-winning director Ivo van Hove made his National Theatre debut in London with a period-less production of the play. This new version by Patrick Marber featured Ruth Wilson in the title role and Rafe Spall as Brack.

In 2017, a ballet interpretation of the play premiered at the Norwegian National Opera and Ballet under the direction of Marit Moum Aune.

Since May 2019, the play has been staged in the National Theatre, Warsaw, with Hedda portrayed by Wiktoria Gorodeckaja.

In February 2023, the play was performed at Mulae Arts Factory (문래예술공장) in Seoul, South Korea. The director was Song Sun-ho (송선호).

The play was part of the 2024 season of the Stratford Festival.

In February 2026, the play was performed at The Old Globe Theatre in San Diego, California. The adaptation by Erin Cressida Wilson starred Katie Holmes as Hedda with Charlie Barnett as George.

In March 2026, the play was performed in Oslo, Norway in English for the first time by Oslo English Players.

== Mass media adaptations ==
The play has been adapted for the screen several times, from the silent film era onwards, in several languages. The BBC screened a television production of the play in 1962, with Ingrid Bergman, Michael Redgrave, Ralph Richardson, and Trevor Howard, while its Play of the Month in 1972 featured Janet Suzman and Ian McKellen in the two main leads. A version shown on the UK's ITV network in 1980 featured Diana Rigg in the title role. Glenda Jackson was nominated for an Academy Award as leading actress for her role in the British film adaptation Hedda (1975) directed by Trevor Nunn. A version was produced for Australian television in 1961.

An American film version released in 2004 relocated the story to a community of young academics in Washington state.

An adaptation (by Brian Friel) of the 2012 Old Vic production was the first broadcast in the United Kingdom on BBC Radio 4 on 9 March 2013.

In 2014, Matthew John also adapted Hedda Gabler starring Rita Ramnani, David R. Butler, and Samantha E. Hunt.

Andreas Kleinert adapted the story to early 21st century Germany in his 2016 film Hedda, starring Susanne Wolff and Godehard Giese.

Hedda, directed by Nia DaCosta and starring Tessa Thompson in the title role, was released in 2025.

== Alternative productions, tribute, and parody ==
The 1998 play The Summer in Gossensass by María Irene Fornés presents a fictionalized account of Elizabeth Robins and Marion Lea's efforts to stage the first London production of Hedda Gabler in 1891.

In the Netflix animated show, Bojack Horseman, an episode features the main character putting on a stage production while in prison with inmates playing the roles.

An operatic adaptation of the play has been produced by Shanghai's Hangzhou XiaoBaiHua Yue Opera House.

An adaptation with a lesbian relationship was staged in Philadelphia in 2009 by the Mauckingbird Theatre Company.

A production at Princeton University's Lewis Center for the Arts featured a male actor, Sean Peter Drohan, in the title role.

Philip Kan Gotanda 'loosely' adapted Hedda Gabler into his 2002 play, The Wind Cries Mary.

A prostitute in the feature film Tristram Shandy: A Cock and Bull Story is named Hedda Gobbler.

The 2009 album Until the Earth Begins to Part by Scottish folk indie-rock band Broken Records features a song, "If Eilert Løvborg Wrote A Song, It Would Sound Like This".

John Cale, Welsh musician and founder of American rock band The Velvet Underground, recorded a song "Hedda Gabler" in 1976, included originally on the 1977 EP Animal Justice (now a bonus track on the CD of the album Sabotage). He performed the song live in 1998, with Siouxsie Sioux, and also in London (5 March 2010) with a band and a 19 piece orchestra in his Paris 1919 tour. The song was covered by the British neofolk band Sol Invictus for the 1995 compilation Im Blutfeuer (Cthulhu Records) and later included as a bonus track on the 2011 reissue of the Sol Invictus album In the Rain.

The Norwegian hard-rock band Black Debbath recorded the song "Motörhedda Gabler" on their Ibsen-inspired album Naar Vi Døde Rocker ("When We Dead Rock"). As the title suggests, the song is also influenced by the British heavy metal band Motörhead.

The original play Heddatron by Elizabeth Meriwether (b. 1981) melds Hedda Gabler with a modern family's search for love despite the invasion of technology into everyday life.

In the 2013 novel Bridget Jones: Mad About The Boy by Helen Fielding, Bridget tries and fails to write a modernized version of Hedda Gabler, which she mistakenly calls "Hedda Gabbler" and believes to have been written by Anton Chekhov. Bridget intends to call her version "The Leaves In His Hair" and set it in Queen's Park, London. Bridget claims to have studied the original play as an undergraduate at Bangor University.

The play is referenced in a short scene in the musical comedy A Gentleman's Guide to Love and Murder, where protagonist Monty Navarro tricks Lady Salome D'Ysquith Pumphrey, a terrible actress ahead of him in royal lineage, into shooting herself with real bullets at the end of Hedda Gabler to ascend to earldom.

Tanika Gupta's 2025 adaptation of the play, entitled Hedda, updates the action to 1948, and is set in London. Gupta's version premiered at the Orange Tree Theatre (located in Richmond, London) in 2025. In this version, the titular character is a mixed-race woman who is concealing her Indian heritage, as well as her birth name- Hema.

In the 2025 film Babygirl, the husband of the protagonist is staging a production of Hedda Gabler, and his comment to his wife that the play is "not about desire, it's about suicide" suggests that he has also misunderstood his wife's secret desires.

In the 2025 film Hedda, the character Eilert Lövborg was gender-switched to Eileen Lovborg, and the story was set in England in the mid-1950s.

In 2002, an adaptation by Robert Prior with an all male cast- titled Speed Hedda, and set in 1962- premiered at LaMama in New York.

== Awards and nominations ==
Awards

- 1992 Laurence Olivier Award for Best Revival
- 2006 Laurence Olivier Award for Best Revival

Nominations

- 2002: Tony Award Nomination for Best Actress in a Play for Kate Burton
- 2005 Lucille Lortel Award for Outstanding Revival

== See also ==
- Chekhov's gun
- Hedda Gabler filmography
