= Hedda Gabler (2016 film) =

- Directed by: Matthew John
- Written by: Matthew John
- Based on: Hedda Gabler by Henrik Ibsen
- Produced by: Nigel Edwards; Hugh Edwards; Sir Benjamin Slade
- Starring: Rita Ramnani; David R. Butler; Samantha E Hunt; Jon-Paul Gates; Francisco Ortiz; Christine Winter; Sephora Venites; Jacqui Dubois
- Edited by: Jack Attwood; Josh Lee; Kristen Muñoz
- Music by: Mark Scales and Ellie Williams
- Production company: Matthew John Productions
- Release date: 8 September 2016 (International Ibsen Festival)
- Country: United Kingdom
- Language: English

Hedda Gabler is a film based on the 1891 Victorian period play Hedda Gabler, written by Norwegian playwright Henrik Ibsen. One of many adaptations of this play, the film Hedda Gabler was produced, adapted, and directed by Matthew John. Hedda Gabler is an example of realism in nineteenth-century playwriting, and is one of the world's best known and most performed dramas. The film was shot at Maunsel House.

The movie premiered at the Vika Cinema, Oslo on 8 September 2016 to open the Ibsen International Festivalen.

A press launch at the Henrik Ibsen Museum on 9 September 2016. the event was sponsored by H+M and Radisson Blu. Matthew John attended the red carpet with Swedish supermodel Marcus Schenkenberg.

The title role is played by Rita Ramnani.

The film is also part of the Worcester University PR and Journalism programme. The film had its UK premiere at the university, followed by talks from the cast, costume designer and director.

== Plot ==
Hedda, the beautiful daughter of the late General Gabler, returns from her honeymoon with scholar husband Jorgen to confront the boredom and banality of married life. Although she has little more than amused contempt for her husband, she is pregnant by him and is revolted by the thought of carrying his child and the changes that motherhood will impose upon her future. When the reappearance of an old flame of hers threatens both Jorgen's career prospects and her own amour-propre, Hedda contrives to bring about Lovborg's destruction but, in the process, also brings about her own.
