= Little Woods =

2018 film

- Theatrical release poster
- Directed by: Nia DaCosta
- Written by: Nia DaCosta
- Produced by: Rachael Fung; Tim Headington; Gabrielle Nadig
- Starring: Tessa Thompson; Lily James; Luke Kirby; James Badge Dale; Lance Reddick
- Cinematography: Matt Mitchell
- Edited by: Catrin Hedström
- Music by: Brian McOmber; Malcolm Parson
- Production companies: Tango Entertainment; Water's End Productions; Automatik; Stone Boies; Extra A Productions; Gabrielle Nadig Productions
- Distributed by: Neon (United States); Limelight Distribution (Australia)
- Release dates: April 21, 2018 (Tribeca); April 19, 2019 (United States); May 16, 2019 (Australia)
- Running time: 105 minutes
- Countries: United States; Australia
- Language: English
- Box office: $171,912

Little Woods is a 2018 crime drama film, written and directed by Nia DaCosta in her feature directorial debut. The film stars Tessa Thompson, Lily James, Luke Kirby, James Badge Dale and Lance Reddick.

Little Woods had its world premiere at the Tribeca Film Festival on 21 April 2018, and was released on 19 April 2019 in the United States by Neon and on 16 May 2019 in Australia by Limelight Distribution. In the United Kingdom, it was released both digitally and on DVD as Crossing the Line on 29 April 2019 by Signature Entertainment.

== Plot ==
Ollie Hale is on probation after being caught illegally crossing the border between North Dakota and Canada. She is determined to reinvent her life and with eight days left on probation she has applied to find work in Spokane. Numerous opportunities to go back to her old way of life, including selling prescription medicine illegally and doing more work at the border, keep presenting themselves though Ollie scrapes by doing odd jobs for the construction workers who work nearby.

Ollie's sister Deb, who has become semi-estranged since their mother's illness and death, discovers she is pregnant and turns to Ollie for help. Deb is already a single mother to her son Johnny and is living in an illegally parked trailer. Ollie offers to sign over the title of their mother's house to Deb, however the house is due to be foreclosed on. Ollie manages to negotiate down the down payment to prevent the foreclosure but the amount of money needed seems insurmountable to the sisters. Ollie is nevertheless determined to ensure that Deb is alright before she leaves.

Reluctantly Ollie returns to the woods to retrieve a bag of 500 pills she hid there before crossing, intending to sell them in a week to prevent foreclosure on the house.

At her job interview for the Spokane job, Ollie is attacked by Bill, a local drug dealer angry she is infringing on his territory. He offers her a choice between giving him a 30 percent cut of her sales or crossing the border for him again. She decides to cut him in, rather than take on the riskier work of crossing the border. After learning that going through with her pregnancy will cost her upwards of $8000, Deb decides to have an abortion. Realising that the only legal clinic is hundreds of miles away, she obtains the name of a local illegal abortion provider. The night Deb is scheduled to go for her abortion, the trailer she lives in is towed away along with the rest of the pills and all of the money for the foreclosure which Ollie had been keeping there to hide from her probation officer. On discovering that the trailer wasn't even registered in Deb's name, Ollie breaks into the pound where she finds the trailer has already been raided and all the money and drugs are gone.

After learning that Deb wants to have an abortion, Ollie decides to agree to Bill's drug run to Canada in exchange for enough money to secure the house, and determines to take Deb across with her so she'll be able to have a safe and clean abortion.

Though Deb has difficulty obtaining a fake Manitoba ID card she is able to steal one. The crossing is successful and Ollie picks up the drugs while Deb is able to have an abortion. While waiting for Deb to come out of the clinic Ollie learns that the Spokane job is hers. The sisters spend the night in Canada and Ollie tells Deb she is leaving and that Deb will be fine without her. The next morning they cross back into the U.S.

== Cast ==
- Tessa Thompson as Oleander "Ollie" Hale
- Lily James as Deb Hale
- Luke Kirby as Bill
- James Badge Dale as Ian
- Lance Reddick as Carter
- Jeremy St. James as Mike
- Charlie Ray Reid as Johnny Hale
- Brandon Potter as Dale
- Ryan Downs Hayden as Joe
- Elizabeth Maxwell as Jenny
- Luci Christian as Sheila
- Morgana Shaw as Gerry
- Rochelle Robinson as Canadian Receptionist

== Production ==
In January 2017, it was announced Tessa Thompson, Lily James, Luke Kirby, James Badge Dale and Lance Reddick joined the cast, with Nia DaCosta directing from a screenplay she wrote. The film was produced by Rachael Fung, Gabrielle Nadig, and Tim Headington.

== Release ==
Little Woods had its world premiere at the Tribeca Film Festival on 21 April 2018. Shortly after, NEON acquired distribution rights to the film. It was screened at the Los Angeles Film Festival on 24 September 2018. It was released in cinemas on 19 April 2019 in the United States and on 16 May 2019 in Australia.

In the United Kingdom, Signature Entertainment released the film both digitally and on DVD as Crossing the Line on 29 April 2019.

=== Critical reception ===
On review aggregator website Rotten Tomatoes, the film holds an approval rating of 95% based on 97 reviews, with an average rating of 7.6/10. The site's critics consensus reads: "Led by standout work from Tessa Thompson, Little Woods tells a grimly absorbing tale that marks a commendable debut for writer-director Nia DaCosta." On Metacritic, the film has a weighted average score of 74 out of 100, based on 21 critics, indicating "generally favorable" reviews.
