= Hedda (2025 film) =

2025 American film based on Ibsen play

- Promotional poster
- Directed by: Nia DaCosta
- Screenplay by: Nia DaCosta
- Based on: Hedda Gabler by Henrik Ibsen
- Produced by: Dede Gardner; Jeremy Kleiner; Gabrielle Nadig; Nia DaCosta; Tessa Thompson
- Starring: Tessa Thompson; Imogen Poots; Tom Bateman; Nicholas Pinnock; Nina Hoss
- Cinematography: Sean Bobbitt
- Edited by: Jacob Secher Schulsinger
- Music by: Hildur Guðnadóttir
- Production companies: Orion Pictures; Plan B Entertainment; Once and Future Productions; Viva Maude
- Distributed by: Amazon MGM Studios (via Prime Video)
- Release dates: September 7, 2025 (TIFF); October 22, 2025 (United States)
- Running time: 107 minutes
- Country: United States
- Language: English
- Budget: $10 million
- Box office: $15,352

Hedda is a 2025 American drama film written and directed by Nia DaCosta, based on Hedda Gabler by Henrik Ibsen. Tessa Thompson stars in the title role and is a producer on the film, with Imogen Poots, Tom Bateman, Nicholas Pinnock, and Nina Hoss in supporting roles.

The film premiered at the 2025 Toronto International Film Festival on September 7, 2025. It was released in select theaters in the United States on October 22, before streaming on Amazon Prime Video on October 29. At the 83rd Golden Globe Awards, Thompson was nominated for Best Actress – Drama.

== Plot ==
In 1950s England, police interrogate Hedda Gabler Tesman following a shooting at her estate. Flashbacks reveal that 24 hours prior, Hedda nearly drowned herself in the estate's lake, stopping only when her former lover, Dr. Eileen Lovborg, called to confirm her attendance at a party that evening. Hedda, recently married to the debt-ridden academic George Tesman, is hosting the event to secure him a professorship from Professor Greenwood.

Prior to Eileen's arrival, Thea Clifton, an aspiring writer who has left her husband, appears at the party. Thea reveals she is Eileen's new romantic partner and collaborator, and that they have co-authored a manuscript about sexuality that Eileen expects will revolutionize the academic field. This manuscript represents the only copy of Eileen's work.

Eileen’s arrival at the party triggers an intense emotional response in Hedda, who still harbors feelings for her. However, during a private conversation, Eileen rejects Hedda's advances and declares that she has moved on with Thea. Eileen characterizes Hedda as a coward for refusing to pursue their relationship openly and instead choosing a conventional marriage to George.

The situation becomes further complicated when it is revealed that Eileen is also competing with George for the same professorship, and her forthcoming publication gives her a significant advantage.

Throughout the evening, Hedda systematically sabotages her guests. She orchestrates a scandal to damage Eileen's standing with Professor Greenwood, then exploits Thea’s fears by pressuring a sober Eileen into drinking. Once Eileen is intoxicated and disheveled, Hedda steals her manuscript, letting Eileen believe she lost it in the lake. This public humiliation drives Thea to end their relationship.

With her career prospects destroyed, her manuscript lost, and her relationship with Thea ended, Eileen falls into despair. In this vulnerable state, Hedda offers Eileen one of General Gabler's pistols, implicitly encouraging her to take her own life. Eileen takes the gun but ultimately cannot bring herself to pull the trigger.

Hedda secretly burns Eileen's manuscript in the fireplace. When George discovers what she is doing and attempts to intervene, Hedda claims she is destroying the manuscript for their benefit and falsely tells him she is pregnant with his child. George, overwhelmed by this news, relents and does not stop her.

As Eileen wanders through the house in a daze, she becomes involved in an altercation with a friend named David. During the scuffle, the gun accidentally discharges, shooting her in the stomach.

As dawn breaks, Hedda learns that George and Thea have decided to work together to reconstruct Eileen's manuscript from notes and memory. George dismisses Hedda's concerns about their finances, stating they will simply move to a smaller house. When Hedda offers to assist in the reconstruction, both George and Thea reject her involvement.

Judge Brack confronts Hedda with the missing pistol. Having observed the events of the evening, he knows the full extent of Hedda's involvement in Eileen's destruction and the shooting. He threatens to expose her to the police unless she submits to his control. Hedda refuses and fires the remaining bullets at Brack, but misses. As she attempts to flee to the lake, Brack pursues and physically assaults her. He only releases her when George calls out from the house.

Hedda escapes to the lake and fills her pockets with stones, walking deeper into the water as she prepares to drown herself. When the water reaches her chin, she hears George and Thea calling out that Eileen has regained consciousness and survived the shooting. Upon hearing this news, Hedda pauses and breaks into an enigmatic smile.

== Cast ==
- Tessa Thompson as Hedda Gabler
- Nina Hoss as Eileen Lovborg
- Imogen Poots as Thea Clifton
- Tom Bateman as George Tesman
- Nicholas Pinnock as Judge Roland Brack
- Finbar Lynch as Professor Greenwood
- Mirren Mack as Tabita Greenwood
- Jamael Westman as David
- Saffron Hocking as Jane Ji
- Kathryn Hunter as Bertie

== Production ==
DaCosta first conceived of adapting Henrik Ibsen's play Hedda Gabler in 2012 while pursuing a master's degree in the United Kingdom, and wrote her first draft of the screenplay in 2018 following the release of her debut feature Little Woods. Even while working on Candyman and The Marvels, DaCosta continued to refine the script every six months. DaCosta has described Hedda and 28 Years Later: The Bone Temple as her most fully realized films in terms of translating her original screenplay to the finished work.

The film was announced in July 2022. In April 2023, Tessa Thompson, who had previously starred in Little Woods, was cast to star in the film, and to serve as a producer. In June, Eve Hewson, Callum Turner, Nina Hoss and Nicholas Pinnock were added to the cast. In January 2024, Imogen Poots, Tom Bateman, Finbar Lynch, Mirren Mack, Jamael Westman, and Saffron Hocking joined the cast of the film, with Poots and Bateman replacing Hewson and Turner.

Pre-production commenced in November 2023. Principal photography began in the United Kingdom by January 2024.

== Release ==
Hedda had its world premiere at the 2025 Toronto International Film Festival on September 7, 2025. It was also screened at the Aspen Film Festival on September 19, 2025, the 56th Nashville Film Festival on September 21, 2025, the Zurich Film Festival on October 1, 2025 as a European premiere, in competition at the 69th BFI London Film Festival on October 12, 2025, and in the non-competitive Grand Public section of the 20th Rome Film Festival on October 16, 2025.

The film was released in select theaters in the United States on October 22, 2025, before streaming on Amazon Prime Video on October 29.

== Reception ==
=== Critical response ===
On the review aggregator website Rotten Tomatoes, 90% of 154 critics' reviews are positive, with an average rating of 7.2/10. The website's consensus reads: "Reveling in Tessa Thompson's commanding turn as Hedda, Nia DaCosta's smoldering update on Henrik Ibsen's seminal play locates a bracingly contemporary pulse within a classic text." Metacritic, which uses a weighted average, assigned the film a score of 70 out of 100, based on 34 critics, indicating "generally favorable" reviews.

Writing for Deadline, Damon Wise says that "despite a certain staginess, and a tendency for the plot to suddenly stop to make way for the acting, Hedda is actually a genuine attempt to mine something new from the old text, a compelling fusion of Emerald Fennell’s Saltburn and Stephen Fry’s Bright Young Things."

=== Accolades ===
Award	Date of ceremony	Category	Recipient(s)	Result	Ref.
African American Film Critics Association	December 9, 2025	Top 10 Films of the Year	Hedda	3rd place	
African American Film Critics Association	December 9, 2025	Best Independent Feature	Hedda	Won	
African American Film Critics Association	December 9, 2025	Best Actress	Tessa Thompson	Won	
Astra Film Awards	January 9, 2026	Best Actress – Drama	Tessa Thompson	Nominated	
Astra Film Awards	January 9, 2026	Best Supporting Actress – Drama	Nina Hoss	Nominated	
Astra Film Awards	January 9, 2026	Best Original Score	Hildur Guðnadóttir	Nominated	
Astra Film Awards	December 11, 2025	Best Costume Design	Lindsay Pugh	Nominated	
Astra Film Awards	December 11, 2025	Best Production Design	Cara Bower and Stella Fox	Nominated	
BFI London Film Festival	October 19, 2025	Best Film	Hedda	Nominated	
Black Reel Awards	February 16, 2026	Outstanding Film	Hedda	Nominated	
Black Reel Awards	February 16, 2026	Outstanding Director	Nia DaCosta	Nominated	
Black Reel Awards	February 16, 2026	Outstanding Lead Performance	Tessa Thompson	Nominated	
Black Reel Awards	February 16, 2026	Outstanding Screenplay	Nia DaCosta	Nominated	
Black Reel Awards	February 16, 2026	Outstanding Original Score	Hildur Guðnadóttir	Nominated	
Black Reel Awards	February 16, 2026	Outstanding Production Design	Hannah Beachler and Monique Champagne	Nominated	
Celebration of Cinema and Television	December 9, 2025	Actress Award – Film	Tessa Thompson	Won	
Chicago Film Critics Association	December 11, 2025	Best Actress	Tessa Thompson	Nominated	
Chicago Film Critics Association	December 11, 2025	Best Supporting Actress	Nina Hoss	Nominated	
Chicago Film Critics Association	December 11, 2025	Best Costume Design	Lindsay Pugh	Nominated	
Chicago International Film Festival	October 19, 2025	Black Perspectives Artistic Achievement Award	Nia DaCosta	Won	
Chicago International Film Festival	October 26, 2025	Gold Q-Hugo	Hedda	Nominated	
Costume Designers Guild	February 12, 2026	Excellence in Period Film	Lindsay Pugh	Nominated	
Critics' Choice Movie Awards	January 4, 2026	Best Costume Design	Lindsay Pugh	Nominated	
Film Independent Spirit Awards	February 15, 2026	Best Lead Performance	Tessa Thompson	Nominated	
Film Independent Spirit Awards	February 15, 2026	Best Supporting Performance	Nina Hoss	Nominated	
Golden Globe Awards	January 11, 2026	Best Actress in a Motion Picture – Drama	Tessa Thompson	Nominated	
Gotham Independent Film Awards	December 1, 2025	Outstanding Lead Performance	Tessa Thompson	Nominated	
Gotham Independent Film Awards	December 1, 2025	Spotlight Tribute Award	Tessa Thompson	Won	
IndieWire Honors	December 4, 2025	Spotlight Award	Nina Hoss	Won	
Middleburg Film Festival	October 19, 2025	Excellence in Acting Award	Nina Hoss	Won	
New York Film Critics Online	December 15, 2025	Best Actress	Tessa Thompson	Nominated	
San Diego Film Critics Society	December 15, 2025	Best Supporting Actress	Nina Hoss	Runner-up	
San Diego Film Critics Society	December 15, 2025	Best Production Design	Cara Brower and Stella Fox	Nominated	
San Diego Film Critics Society	December 15, 2025	Best Use of Music	Hedda	Runner-up	
Savannah Film Festival	October 30, 2025	Distinguished Performance Award	Tessa Thompson	Won	
Toronto Film Critics Association	March 2, 2026	Outstanding Supporting Performance	Nina Hoss	Won (Note: Also awarded to Benicio del Toro)	
Toronto International Film Festival	September 7, 2025	TIFF Tribute Performance Award	Nina Hoss	Won	
Virginia Film Festival	October 24, 2025	Craft Award for Production Design	Cara Brower	Won	
